= 2011 Safeway Championship =

- Host city: Beausejour, Manitoba
- Arena: Sun Gro Centre
- Dates: February 9–13
- Winner: Team Stoughton
- Curling club: Charleswood CC, Winnipeg
- Skip: Jeff Stoughton
- Third: Jon Mead
- Second: Reid Carruthers
- Lead: Steve Gould
- Finalist: Mike McEwen

The 2011 Safeway Championship, Manitoba men's provincial curling championship was held February 9 to 13 at the Sun Gro Centre in Beausejour. The winning Jeff Stoughton rink represented Manitoba at the 2011 Tim Hortons Brier in London, Ontario where they captured the Brier tankard. As of 2024, this is the last time that a Manitoba provincial champion won a Brier.

== Teams ==
Thirty-two teams qualify for the men's provincial championship in Manitoba. Berths 1–14 represent the rural zones, berths 15–21 represent the Winnipeg zones. There are two separate bonspiels played earlier in the year representing the north and south called the Northern and Southern Bonspiels; these represent berths 22 and 23. Berth 24 is the winner of the Brandon Bonspiel played around the same time of fall as the Northern and Southern floating bonspiels. Number 25 is the prior Manitoba Champion assuming the team meets the requirements to represent themselves. The same goes for berths 26 and 27, which are the Manitoba Curling Tour champion and top Manitoba team on the Canadian Team Ranking System respectively, number 27 must be declared by November 1, 2010. Numbers 28–32 are qualifiers from the MCA Bonspiel, also subject to subset rules and requirements.

Once all 32 teams have been qualified, they will be seeded respectively and slotted into the draw format of 1 vs 32, 2 vs 31, and so on.

Skip	Third	Second	Lead	Club(s)	Berth Number	Seed	Notes
Dean North	Billy North Jr.	Billy North Sr.	Fred McCollough	Carman CC	1	24	Zone 1 winner
Scott Madams	Braden Zawada	Ian Fordyce	Nigel Milnes	Beausejour CC	2	16	Zone 2 winner
Rob Atkins	Bill Kuran	Graham Grimes	Grant Steski	East St. Paul CC	3	26	Zone 3 winner
Andy Stewart	Kevin Thompson	Bryan Galbraith	Brent Baschuk	Rosser CC	4	19	Zone 4 winner
Ryan Hyde	Hartley Vanstone	Barry Pugh	Jared Muno	Portage CC	5	22	Zone 5 winner
Perry Fisher	Kevin Cullen	Brett McGregor	Sean Martin	Wawanesa CC	6	31	Zone 6 winner
Rob Ramage	Shawn McCutheson	Darcy Hayward	Mike Hutton	Baldur CC	7	20	Zone 7 winner
Terry McNammee	Steve Irwin	Geordie Hargreaves	Travis Saban	Brandon CC	8	8	Zone 8 winner
Graham Freeman	Cary Barkley	Kevin Barkley	Dwayne Barkley	Virden CC	9	21	Zone 9 winner
Brent Strachan	Dale Brooks	Tim Weber	Jim Strath	Hamiota CC	10	27	Zone 10 winner
Roger Parker	Jason Yates	James Cook	Ian Ferley	Dauphin CC	11	30	Zone 11 winner
Brent Scales	Gord Hardy	Howie Scales	Todd Trevellyan	Swan River CC	12	15	Zone 12 winner
Don Holmes	Dennis Anderson	Russ Kennedy	Jim Meyer	Willow Park CC	13	32	Zone 13 winner
Travis Graham	Farrol Asham	Ian Graham	Grant Brown	Burntwood CC	14	25	Zone 14 winner
Dean Dunstone (Fourth)	Peter Nicholls (Skip)	Dean Moxham	Ron Gauthier	Pembina CC	15	4	Zone 15 winner
Daley Peters (Fourth)	Vic Peters (Skip)	Kyle Werenich	Cory Naharnie	Fort Garry CC	16	5	Zone 16 winner
David Bohn	Dennis Bohn	Kody Janzen	Larry Solomon	Assiniboine; Memorial CC	17	6	Zone 17 winner
Sean Grassie	Corey Chambers	Scott McCamis	Stuart Shiells	Deer Lodge CC	18	9	Zone 18 winner
Garth Smith	Ken Tresoor	Ross McFadyen	Myles Riddell	Assiniboine; Memorial CC	19	17	Zone 19 winner
Randy Dutiaume	Kyle Einarson	Matt Lacroix	Cory Wolchuk	Thistle CC	20	12	Zone 20 winner
Bob Sigurdson	Darren Oryniak	Al Purdy	Chad Barkman	Granite CC	21	13	Zone 21 winner
Jeff Stoughton	Jon Mead	Reid Carruthers	Steve Gould	Charleswood CC	22	2	Southern Berth Bonspiel winner
Greg Todoruk	Dwight Bottrell	Darcy Todoruk	Mike Csversko	Dauphin CC	23	28	Northern Berth Bonspiel winner
William Lyburn	James Kirkness	Alex Forrest	Greg Melnichuk	Deer Lodge CC	24	7	Brandon Men's Berth Bonspiel winner
Dave Elias	Chris Suchy	Hub Perrin	Shane Kilgallen	West Kildonan CC	25	10	Prior Manitoba Champion; Will be deferred to the MCA Bonspiel; MCA Bonspiel Asham Event qualifier
Rob Fowler	Allan Lyburn	Richard Daneault	Derek Samagalski	Charleswood CC	26	3	Manitoba Curling Tour winner. Jan 7–9
Mike McEwen	B.J. Neufeld	Matt Wozniak	Denni Neufeld	Assiniboine; Memorial CC	27	1	Manitoba's top team from the Canadian; Team Ranking System
Dave Boehmer	Cory Allan	Terry McRae	Jeff Donohoe	Petersfield CC	28	14	MCA Bonspiel Asham Event qualifier
Troy Hamilton	Thomas Small	Jason Kasdorf	Bryan Harder	Fort Rouge CC	29	29	MCA Bonspiel Safeway-Lucerne Event qualifier
Randy Neufeld	Cory Anderson	Jeff Warkentin	Scott Podolsky	La Salle CC	30	18	MCA Bonspiel Safeway-Lucerne Event qualifier
Barrie Sigurdson	Steen Sigurdson	Adam Cseke	Karl Jakobson	Gimli CC	31	23	MCA Bonspiel Winnipeg Free Press Event qualifier
David Hamblin	Ross Derksen	Ryan Thomson	Mark Georges	Morris CC	32	11	MCA Bonspiel Winnipeg Free Press Event qualifier

== Knockout Brackets ==
32 team double knockout with playoff round
Four teams qualify each from A Event and B Event

=== A Event ===
First Knockout	Qualifier 1
Brent Scales	3
Randy Neufeld	9
Randy Neufeld	4
Jeff Stoughton	6
Jeff Stoughton	8
Perry Fisher	3
Jeff Stoughton	8
William Lyburn	1
Rob Atkins	3
William Lyburn	6
William Lyburn	10
Dave Elias	2
Dave Elias	11
Barrie Sigurdson	7

First Knockout	Qualifier 2
Ryan Hyde	5
David Hamblin	4
Ryan Hyde	7
Brent Strachan	9
David Bohn	7
Brent Strachan	9
Brent Strachan	2
Rob Fowler	8
Roger Parker	5
Rob Fowler	10
Rob Fowler	8
Dave Boehmer	4
Dave Boehmer	5
Andy Stewart	4

First Knockout	Qualifier 3
Rob Ramage	3
Bob Sigurdson	8
Bob Sigurdson	3
Peter Nicholls	6
Peter Nicholls	8
Troy Hamilton	7
Peter Nicholls	5
Vic Peters	7
Greg Todoruk	3
Vic Peters	10
Vic Peters	7
Randy Dutiaume	6
Randy Dutiaume	9
Graham Freeman	7

First Knockout	Qualifier 4
Scott Madams	6
Garth Smith	7
Garth Smith	5
Mike McEwen	6
Mike McEwen	11
Don Holmes	2
Mike McEwen	7
Sean Grassie	3
Travis Graham	6
Terry McNamee	3
Travis Graham	4
Sean Grassie	9
Sean Grassie	10
Dean North	1

=== B Event ===
Second Knockout	Qualifier 5
Dave Elias	7
Brent Scales	8	Brent Scales	9	William Lyburn	6
Perry Fisher	3	Brent Scales	5	Randy Neufeld	9
Randy Neufeld	6
Randy Neufeld	10
Rob Atkins	9	Rob Atkins	2
Barrie Sigurdson	4

Second Knockout	Qualifier 6
Dave Boehmer	6
David Hamblin	8	David Hamblin	7	Brent Strachan	5
David Bohn	7	David Hamblin	7	Andy Stewart	6
Andy Stewart	8
Ryan Hyde	6
Roger Parker	4	Andy Stewart	10
Andy Stewart	7

Second Knockout	Qualifier 7
Randy Dutiaume	8
Rob Ramage	5	Rob Ramage	3	Peter Nicholls	4
Troy Hamilton	3	Randy Dutiaume	4	Bob Sigurdson	7
Bob Sigurdson	7
Bob Sigurdson	7
Greg Todoruk	2	Graham Freeman	2
Graham Freeman	10

Second Knockout	Qualifier 8
Travis Graham	7
Scott Madams	11	Scott Madams	5	Sean Grassie	4
Don Holmes	5	Travis Graham	2	Terry McNamee	9
Terry McNamee	8
Garth Smith	4
Terry McNamee	9	Terry McNamee	9
Dean North	3

== Knockout Results ==
All draw times are listed in Central Standard Time (UTC−06:00).

=== Draw 1 ===
Wednesday, February 9, 8:30 am

Sheet A	1	2	3	4	5	6	7	8	9	10	Final
Brent Scales	1	0	1	0	0	1	0	X	X	X	3
Randy Neufeld	0	4	0	2	1	0	2	X	X	X	9

Sheet B	1	2	3	4	5	6	7	8	9	10	Final
Jeff Stoughton	0	1	1	0	2	0	2	1	1	X	8
Perry Fisher	1	0	0	1	0	1	0	0	0	X	3

Sheet C	1	2	3	4	5	6	7	8	9	10	Final
Rob Atkins	2	0	0	1	0	0	0	0	0	X	3
William Lyburn	0	0	2	0	1	3	0	0	0	X	6

Sheet D	1	2	3	4	5	6	7	8	9	10	Final
Dave Elias	3	1	0	3	0	3	0	0	0	1	11
Barrie Sigurdson	0	0	1	0	3	0	2	1	0	0	7

Sheet E	1	2	3	4	5	6	7	8	9	10	Final
Ryan Hyde	0	0	0	0	0	1	0	2	0	2	5
David Hamblin	2	0	0	0	1	0	1	0	0	0	4

=== Draw 2 ===
Wednesday, February 9, 12:15 pm

Sheet A	1	2	3	4	5	6	7	8	9	10	Final
Peter Nicholls	1	0	4	0	2	0	0	1	0	0	8
Troy Hamilton	0	2	0	1	0	0	0	0	2	2	7

Sheet B	1	2	3	4	5	6	7	8	9	10	Final
Rob Ramage	1	0	1	0	0	0	1	0	0	X	3
Bob Sigurdson	0	1	0	2	1	0	0	1	3	X	8

Sheet C	1	2	3	4	5	6	7	8	9	10	Final
Dave Boehmer	0	0	1	0	1	0	0	2	0	1	5
Andy Stewart	0	0	0	2	0	0	1	0	1	0	4

Sheet D	1	2	3	4	5	6	7	8	9	10	Final
Roger Parker	0	1	1	0	1	0	2	0	X	X	5
Rob Fowler	3	0	0	3	0	1	0	3	X	X	10

Sheet E	1	2	3	4	5	6	7	8	9	10	11	Final
David Bohn	0	0	1	0	1	1	0	2	0	2	0	7
Brent Strachan	0	1	0	2	0	0	1	0	3	0	2	9

=== Draw 3 ===
Wednesday, February 9, 4:00 pm

Sheet A	1	2	3	4	5	6	7	8	9	10	Final
Travis Graham	0	0	0	2	1	1	0	1	1	X	6
Terry McNamee	1	0	2	0	0	0	0	0	0	X	3

Sheet B	1	2	3	4	5	6	7	8	9	10	Final
Randy Dutiaume	3	0	1	0	2	0	0	1	0	2	9
Graham Freeman	0	1	0	1	0	2	1	0	2	0	7

Sheet C	1	2	3	4	5	6	7	8	9	10	Final
Scott Madams	2	0	0	1	1	0	0	0	1	1	6
Garth Smith	0	1	0	0	0	3	0	3	0	0	7

Sheet D	1	2	3	4	5	6	7	8	9	10	Final
Mike McEwen	3	3	0	1	0	4	X	X	X	X	11
Don Holmes	0	0	1	0	1	0	X	X	X	X	2

Sheet E	1	2	3	4	5	6	7	8	9	10	Final
Greg Todoruk	0	1	0	2	0	0	X	X	X	X	3
Vic Peters	3	0	3	0	0	4	X	X	X	X	10

=== Draw 4 ===
Wednesday, February 9, 8:15 pm

Sheet A	1	2	3	4	5	6	7	8	9	10	Final
Sean Grassie	0	1	0	1	6	2	X	X	X	X	10
Dean North	0	0	1	0	0	0	X	X	X	X	1

Sheet B	1	2	3	4	5	6	7	8	9	10	Final
Rob Atkins	3	0	3	0	0	0	2	0	1	X	9
Barrie Sigurdson	0	1	0	0	1	0	0	2	0	X	4

Sheet C	1	2	3	4	5	6	7	8	9	10	Final
Brent Scales	1	0	2	0	0	3	0	2	X	X	8
Perry Fisher	0	1	0	0	1	0	1	0	X	X	3

Sheet D	1	2	3	4	5	6	7	8	9	10	Final
Roger Parker	0	0	1	0	0	2	0	1	0	X	4
Andy Stewart	0	1	0	2	0	0	2	0	2	X	7

Sheet E	1	2	3	4	5	6	7	8	9	10	Final
David Hamblin	0	0	2	0	0	3	2	0	0	1	8
David Bohn	0	1	0	2	1	0	0	2	1	0	7

=== Draw 5 ===
Thursday, February 10, 8:30 am

Sheet A	1	2	3	4	5	6	7	8	9	10	Final
Rob Fowler	2	1	0	1	0	3	0	0	1	X	8
Dave Boehmer	0	0	1	0	2	0	0	1	0	X	4

Sheet B	1	2	3	4	5	6	7	8	9	10	Final
Bob Sigurdson	0	1	0	0	0	0	1	1	0	X	3
Peter Nicholls	2	0	1	0	0	1	0	0	2	X	6

Sheet C	1	2	3	4	5	6	7	8	9	10	Final
Vic Peters	2	0	1	1	1	0	2	0	0	0	7
Randy Dutiaume	0	3	0	0	0	1	0	0	1	1	6

Sheet D	1	2	3	4	5	6	7	8	9	10	Final
Rob Ramage	1	1	0	1	1	0	0	1	0	X	5
Troy Hamilton	0	0	1	0	0	0	2	0	0	X	3

Sheet E	1	2	3	4	5	6	7	8	9	10	Final
Greg Todoruk	0	0	1	0	1	0	0	X	X	X	2
Graham Freeman	1	0	0	2	0	4	3	X	X	X	10

=== Draw 6 ===
Thursday, February 10, 12:15 pm

Sheet A	1	2	3	4	5	6	7	8	9	10	Final
Randy Neufeld	1	0	0	2	0	0	0	1	0	X	4
Jeff Stoughton	0	1	2	0	1	0	1	0	1	X	6

Sheet B	1	2	3	4	5	6	7	8	9	10	Final
William Lyburn	3	0	4	1	0	2	X	X	X	X	10
Dave Elias	0	1	0	0	1	0	X	X	X	X	2

Sheet C	1	2	3	4	5	6	7	8	9	10	Final
Ryan Hyde	0	0	1	0	1	0	3	0	1	1	7
Brent Strachan	2	3	0	2	0	1	0	1	0	0	9

Sheet D	1	2	3	4	5	6	7	8	9	10	Final
Garth Smith	0	0	0	0	1	0	2	0	2	0	5
Mike McEwen	0	1	1	0	0	3	0	0	0	1	6

Sheet E	1	2	3	4	5	6	7	8	9	10	Final
Travis Graham	0	0	0	0	1	0	0	3	X	X	4
Sean Grassie	1	2	2	1	0	0	3	0	X	X	9

=== Draw 7 ===
Thursday, February 10, 4:00 pm

Sheet A	1	2	3	4	5	6	7	8	9	10	Final
Scott Madams	0	2	0	3	0	3	0	3	X	X	11
Don Holmes	1	0	1	0	1	0	2	0	X	X	5

Sheet B	1	2	3	4	5	6	7	8	9	10	Final
Terry McNamee	1	0	0	0	1	0	0	2	1	4	9
Dean North	0	1	0	0	0	2	0	0	0	0	3

Sheet C	1	2	3	4	5	6	7	8	9	10	11	Final
David Hamblin	1	0	2	0	1	0	1	0	1	0	1	7
Dave Boehmer	0	1	0	1	0	1	0	1	0	2	0	6

Sheet D	1	2	3	4	5	6	7	8	9	10	Final
Rob Ramage	1	0	0	0	0	1	1	0	X	X	3
Randy Dutiaume	0	2	2	1	1	0	0	2	X	X	8

Sheet E	1	2	3	4	5	6	7	8	9	10	Final
Graham Freeman	0	1	0	0	1	X	X	X	X	X	2
Bob Sigurdson	1	0	2	4	0	X	X	X	X	X	7

=== Draw 8 ===
Thursday, February 10, 7:45 pm

Sheet A	1	2	3	4	5	6	7	8	9	10	Final
Brent Scales	1	0	4	0	0	0	1	1	0	2	9
Dave Elias	0	2	0	2	1	0	0	0	2	0	7

Sheet B	1	2	3	4	5	6	7	8	9	10	Final
Rob Atkins	0	0	1	0	1	0	0	X	X	X	2
Randy Neufeld	0	1	0	2	0	1	6	X	X	X	10

Sheet C	1	2	3	4	5	6	7	8	9	10	Final
Andy Stewart	0	2	0	2	1	2	0	1	2	X	10
Ryan Hyde	2	0	2	0	0	0	2	0	0	X	6

Sheet D	1	2	3	4	5	6	7	8	9	10	Final
Scott Madams	0	1	0	2	0	2	0	0	0	X	5
Travis Graham	0	0	1	0	1	0	2	0	3	X	7

Sheet E	1	2	3	4	5	6	7	8	9	10	Final
Terry McNamee	3	0	1	0	1	0	0	3	1	X	9
Garth Smith	0	2	0	1	0	1	0	0	0	X	4

=== Draw 9 ===
Friday, February 11, 8:30 am

Sheet A	1	2	3	4	5	6	7	8	9	10	Final
Jeff Stoughton	0	2	0	5	0	1	X	X	X	X	8
William Lyburn	0	0	1	0	0	0	X	X	X	X	1

Sheet B	1	2	3	4	5	6	7	8	9	10	Final
Brent Strachan	0	1	0	0	1	X	X	X	X	X	2
Rob Fowler	1	0	4	3	0	X	X	X	X	X	8

Sheet C	1	2	3	4	5	6	7	8	9	10	11	Final
Peter Nicholls	0	0	0	2	0	1	0	1	0	1	0	5
Vic Peters	1	0	0	0	1	0	2	0	1	0	2	7

Sheet D	1	2	3	4	5	6	7	8	9	10	Final
Mike McEwen	2	1	0	1	0	0	1	0	0	2	7
Sean Grassie	0	0	1	0	1	1	0	0	0	0	3

=== Draw 10 ===
Friday, February 11, 12:15 pm

Sheet B	1	2	3	4	5	6	7	8	9	10	Final
Brent Scales	0	0	2	0	2	0	0	0	1	X	5
Randy Neufeld	1	1	0	2	0	0	1	1	0	X	6

Sheet C	1	2	3	4	5	6	7	8	9	10	Final
David Hamblin	0	2	1	0	2	0	1	0	1	0	7
Andy Stewart	0	0	0	2	0	3	0	1	0	2	8

Sheet D	1	2	3	4	5	6	7	8	9	10	Final
Randy Dutiaume	0	1	0	1	0	0	1	0	1	0	4
Bob Sigurdson	3	0	1	0	1	1	0	1	0	0	7

Sheet E	1	2	3	4	5	6	7	8	9	10	Final
Travis Graham	0	1	0	0	1	0	0	X	X	X	2
Terry McNamee	1	0	1	4	0	1	1	X	X	X	8

=== Draw 11 ===
Friday, February 11, 4:00 pm

Sheet A	1	2	3	4	5	6	7	8	9	10	Final
Randy Neufeld	2	2	0	1	0	1	0	3	0	X	9
William Lyburn	0	0	2	0	1	0	2	0	1	X	6

Sheet B	1	2	3	4	5	6	7	8	9	10	Final
Andy Stewart	1	0	1	0	1	1	0	1	0	1	6
Brent Strachan	0	1	0	2	0	0	2	0	0	0	5

Sheet C	1	2	3	4	5	6	7	8	9	10	11	Final
Bob Sigurdson	0	0	0	0	2	0	0	0	2	0	3	7
Peter Nicholls	0	0	0	1	0	2	0	0	0	1	0	4

Sheet D	1	2	3	4	5	6	7	8	9	10	Final
Terry McNamee	2	0	2	1	0	0	3	0	1	X	9
Sean Grassie	0	1	0	0	1	0	0	2	0	X	4

== Playoff Brackets ==
8 team double knockout
Four teams qualify into Championship Round

=== A event ===
First Knockout
Q1	Jeff Stoughton	6
Q6	Andy Stewart	1
Q2	Rob Fowler	8
Q5	Randy Neufeld	3

Qualifier 1
Q1	Jeff Stoughton	7
Q2	Rob Fowler	5

First Knockout
Q3	Vic Peters	6
Q8	Terry McNamee	9
Q4	Mike McEwen	4
Q7	Bob Sigurdson	3

Qualifier 2
Q8	Terry McNamee	9
Q4	Mike McEwen	4

=== B event ===
Second Knockout			Qualifier 3
			Q4	Mike McEwen	7
Q6	Andy Stewart	4	Q5	Randy Neufeld	2
Q5	Randy Neufeld	7

Second Knockout			Qualifier 4
			Q2	Rob Fowler	6
Q3	Vic Peters	9	Q3	Vic Peters	8
Q7	Bob Sigurdson	4

== Playoff Results ==
=== Draw 12 ===
Friday, February 11, 7:45 pm

Team	1	2	3	4	5	6	7	8	9	10	Final
Jeff Stoughton	2	1	1	1	0	1	X	X	X	X	6
Andy Stewart	0	0	0	0	1	0	X	X	X	X	1

Team	1	2	3	4	5	6	7	8	9	10	Final
Rob Fowler	0	0	3	1	0	1	0	3	X	X	8
Randy Neufeld	0	1	0	0	1	0	1	0	X	X	3

Team	1	2	3	4	5	6	7	8	9	10	Final
Vic Peters	1	0	2	0	0	0	2	0	1	0	6
Terry McNamee	0	2	0	0	2	1	0	1	0	3	9

Team	1	2	3	4	5	6	7	8	9	10	11	Final
Mike McEwen	0	0	1	0	0	1	0	0	1	0	1	4
Bob Sigurdson	0	0	0	1	0	0	1	0	0	1	0	3

=== Draw 13 ===
Saturday, February 12, 8:30 am

Team	1	2	3	4	5	6	7	8	9	10	Final
Jeff Stoughton	0	0	0	0	3	0	2	0	2	X	7
Rob Fowler	0	0	1	1	0	2	0	1	0	X	5

Team	1	2	3	4	5	6	7	8	9	10	Final
Terry McNamee	1	0	1	0	2	0	0	5	X	X	9
Mike McEwen	0	1	0	1	0	1	1	0	X	X	4

Team	1	2	3	4	5	6	7	8	9	10	Final
Andy Stewart	0	0	1	0	0	1	1	0	1	X	4
Randy Neufeld	0	0	0	3	1	0	0	3	0	X	7

Team	1	2	3	4	5	6	7	8	9	10	Final
Vic Peters	4	0	2	0	1	0	0	2	X	X	9
Bob Sigurdson	0	2	0	1	0	0	1	0	X	X	4

=== Draw 14 ===
Saturday, February 12, 1:30 pm

Team	1	2	3	4	5	6	7	8	9	10	Final
Randy Neufeld	0	1	0	0	0	1	0	0	0	X	2
Mike McEwen	1	0	0	1	1	0	0	2	2	X	7

Team	1	2	3	4	5	6	7	8	9	10	Final
Vic Peters	0	2	0	2	0	2	0	1	0	1	8
Rob Fowler	1	0	1	0	2	0	2	0	0	0	6

== Championship Round ==
Page playoff system
1	Jeff Stoughton	8
2	Terry McNamee	3
3	Mike McEwen	5
4	Vic Peters	4

Semifinal
2	Terry McNamee	3
3	Mike McEwen	6

Final
1	Jeff Stoughton	5
3	Mike McEwen	4

=== 1 vs. 2 ===
Saturday, February 12, 6:30 pm

Team	1	2	3	4	5	6	7	8	9	10	Final
Jeff Stoughton	2	0	1	0	1	1	0	3	X	X	8
Terry McNamee	0	1	0	1	0	0	1	0	X	X	3

=== 3 vs. 4 ===
Saturday, February 12, 6:30 pm

Team	1	2	3	4	5	6	7	8	9	10	11	Final
Mike McEwen	1	0	0	0	1	0	0	1	1	0	1	5
Vic Peters	0	1	0	0	0	2	0	0	0	1	0	4

=== Semifinal ===
Sunday, February 13, 9:00 am

Team	1	2	3	4	5	6	7	8	9	10	Final
Terry McNamee	0	0	2	0	0	0	1	0	0	X	3
Mike McEwen	0	0	0	1	1	1	0	2	1	X	6

=== Final ===
Sunday, February 13, 1:30 pm

Team	1	2	3	4	5	6	7	8	9	10	Final
Jeff Stoughton 🔨	0	0	2	1	0	0	0	1	0	1	5
Mike McEwen	1	0	0	0	1	0	0	0	2	0	4

2011 Safeway Championship

Jeff Stoughton
9th Manitoba Provincial Championship title

== Awards ==
All-Star Team

- Skip – Terry McNamee, Team McNamee
- Third – Vic Peters, Team Peters
- Second – Reid Carruthers, Team Stoughton
- Lead – Steve Gould, Team Stoughton
