= 2010 Safeway Championship =

- Host city: Steinbach, Manitoba
- Arena: T.G. Smith Centre
- Dates: February 10–14
- Winner: Team Stoughton
- Curling club: Charleswood CC, Winnipeg
- Skip: Jeff Stoughton
- Third: Kevin Park
- Second: Rob Fowler
- Lead: Steve Gould
- Finalist: Mike McEwen

The 2010 Safeway Championship, Manitoba's provincial men's curling championship was held February 10 to 14 at the T.G. Smith Centre in Steinbach, Manitoba. The winning Jeff Stoughton rink went on to represent Manitoba at the 2010 Tim Hortons Brier in Halifax, Nova Scotia.

== Teams ==
Teams are listed as follows:

Skip	Third	Second	Lead	Alternate	Club
Randy Neufeld	Cory Anderson	Birk Cramer	Scott Podolski	Jeff Warkentin	La Salle CC, Thompson
Jason Gunnlaugson	Justin Richter	Braden Zawada	Tyler Forrest		Beausejour CC, Beausejour
David Boehmer	Kyle Einarson	Matthew LaCroix	Jason Bedard	Marc LaCroix	Petersfield CC, Petersfield
Randy Dutiaume	Andy Stewart	Greg Melnichuck	Cory Wolchuck		Stony Mountain CC, Stony Mountain
Ryan Hyde	Hartley Vanstone	Jared Munro	Ashley Linden	Trevor Munro	Portage CC, Portage la Prairie
Kelly Marnoch	Tyler Waterhouse	Cale Dunbar	Chris Cameron	Evan Reynolds	Carberry CC, Carberry
Curtis McCannell	Eric Atkins	Don Vines	Jason Morrow	William Harding	Pilot Mound CC, Pilot Mound
Allan Lyburn	Scott Ramsay	Mark Taylor	Cory Barkley		Brandon CC, Brandon
Murray Warren	Lorne Sambrook	Terry Warren	Reg Warren	Kyle Sambrook	Deloraine CC, Deloraine
Terry McNamee	Steven Irwin	Allan Lawn	Travis Saban	Adam Norget	Hamiota CC, Hamiota
Peter Prokopowich	Al Jenson	Jim Winfield	Kevin Lynch		Dauphin CC, Dauphin
Murray Woodward	Blaine Gogal	Sean Nedohin	Dave Salahub		Flin Flon CC, Flin Flon
Travis Graham	Farrol Asham	Grant Brown	Glen Ringrose	Darwin Graham	Burntwood CC, Thompson
Shawn Magnusson	Kevin Vigfusson	Cory Mamchuk	Darcy Jacobs	Aaron Magnusson	Riverton CC, Riverton
Kerry Burtnyk	Don Walchuk	Rich Daneault	Garth Smith		Assiniboine Memorial CC, Winnipeg
David Kraichy	Jim Coleman	Rylan Young	Brad VanWallaghem	Lynn Coleman	Pembina CC, Pembina
Brendan Taylor	Kyle Werenich	Taren Gesell	Cory Naharnie		West Kildonan CC, Winnipeg
Andrew Wickman	Kyle Foster	Ken Buchanan	Kieth Doherty	James Kirkness	West Kildonan CC, Winnipeg
Dave Elias	William Kuhran	Hubert Perrin	Chris Suchy		West Kildonan CC, Winnipeg
Bob Sigurdson	Darren Oryniak	Al Purdy	Chad Barkman		Granite CC, Winnipeg
Sean Grassie	Michael Johnson	Scott McCamis	Nathan Bodnarchuk	Brett Cawson	Deer Lodge CC, Winnipeg
David Bohn	Dennis Bohn	Kody Janzen	Larry Solomon		Assiniboine Memorial CC, Winnipeg
Wayne Ewasko	Randal Thomas	Dave Beaudoin	Dallas Senebald	Trevor Lyons	Heather CC, Winnipeg
William Lyburn	Geordie Hargreaves	Keith Marshall	Mike Marshall	Ken Tresoor	Brandon CC, Brandon
Reid Carruthers	Chrais Galbraith	Derek Samagalski	Shane Kilgallen		West St. Paul CC, West St. Paul
Jeff Stoughton	Kevin Park	Rob Fowler	Steve Gould		Charleswood CC, Winnipeg
Mike McEwen	B.J. Neufeld	Matt Wozniak	Denni Neufeld		Assiniboine Memorial CC, Winnipeg
David Hamblin	Ross Derksen	Ryan Thomson	Mark Georges	Kris Mazinke	Morris CC, Morris
Andrew Irving	Ryan Hlatkey	Robby Robidoux	Ryan Schwab		Heather CC, Winnipeg
Kevin Larson	Garth Light	Greg Scott	Joerg Arnold	Phil Cook	Springfield CC, Springfield
Doug Riach	Nathan Asham	Mike Friesen	A.J. Giardin	Shane Halliburton	West Kildonan CC, Winnipeg
Jim Kirkness	Rick Pullen	Reg Steckler	Don Newbury	Gerry Wilson	Fort Rouge CC, Winnipeg

== Knockout Brackets ==
32 team double knockout with playoff round
Four teams qualify each from A Event and B Event

=== A Event ===
First Knockout	Qualifier 1
David Kraichy	9
William Lyburn	7
David Kraichy	2
Mike McEwen	7
Mike McEwen	10
Curtis McCannell	1
Mike McEwen	8
Murray Warren	2
Murray Warren	8
Allan Lyburn	4
Murray Warren	7
Andrew Wickman	6
Terry McNamee	3
Andrew Wickman	5

First Knockout	Qualifier 2
Kelly Marnoch	5
Dave Elias	10
Dave Elias	7
Peter Prokowich	9
David Bohn	7
Peter Prokowich	9
Peter Prokowich	5
Kerry Burtnyk	6
Kevin Larson	3
Kerry Burtnyk	7
Kerry Burtnyk	9
Sean Grassie	3
David Hamblin	8
Sean Grassie	10

First Knockout	Qualifier 3
Doug Riach	9
Randy Neufeld	6
Doug Riach	1
Reid Carruthers	7
Reid Carruthers	5
Andrew Irving	4
Reid Carruthers	7
Jason Gunnlaugson	10
Wayne Ewasko	3
Jason Gunnlaugson	6
Jason Gunnlaugson	8
Murray Woodward	6
Dave Boehmer	4
Murray Woodward	9

First Knockout	Qualifier 4
Brent Scales	4
Bob Sigurdson	6
Bob Sigurdson	3
Jeff Stoughton	7
Jeff Stoughton	8
Jim Kirkness	2
Jeff Stoughton	8
Randy Dutiaume	3
Travis Graham	0
Brendan Taylor	7
Brendan Taylor	5
Randy Dutiaume	6
Randy Dutiaume	9
Ryan Hyde	6

=== B Event ===
Second Knockout	Qualifier 5
Andrew Wickman	3
William Lyburn	5	William Lyburn	6	Murray Warren	5
Curtis McCannell	4	William Lyburn	5	Allan Lyburn	8
Allan Lyburn	8
David Kraichy	6
Allan Lyburn	10	Allan Lyburn	7
Terry McNamee	6

Second Knockout	Qualifier 6
Sean Grassie	2
Kelly Marnoch	2	David Bohn	7	Peter Prokowich	3
David Bohn	9	David Bohn	5	David Hamblin	8
David Hamblin	8
Dave Elias	3
Kevin Larson	6	David Hamblin	7
David Hamblin	9

Second Knockout	Qualifier 7
Murray Woodward	0
Randy Neufeld	11	Randy Neufeld	12	Reid Carruthers	5
Andrew Irving	6	Randy Neufeld	7	Randy Neufeld	6
Doug Riach	5
Doug Riach	7
Wayne Ewasko	8	Dave Boehmer	5
Dave Boehmer	10

Second Knockout	Qualifier 8
Brendan Taylor	6
Brent Scales	13	Brent Scales	3	Randy Dutiaume	5
Jim Kirkness	2	Brendan Taylor	6	Brendan Taylor	6
Travis Graham	3
Bob Sigurdson	7
Travis Graham	10	Travis Graham	9
Ryan Hyde	2

== Knockout Results ==
All draw times are listed in Central Standard Time (UTC−06:00).

=== Draw 1 ===
Wednesday, February 10, 8:30 am

Team	1	2	3	4	5	6	7	8	9	10	11	Final
David Kraichy	0	3	0	0	2	0	0	1	0	1	2	9
William Lyburn	1	0	0	2	0	1	2	0	1	0	0	7

Team	1	2	3	4	5	6	7	8	9	10	Final
Mike McEwen	4	1	3	0	2	X	X	X	X	X	10
Curtis McCannell	0	0	0	1	0	X	X	X	X	X	1

Team	1	2	3	4	5	6	7	8	9	10	Final
Murray Warren	2	0	0	3	0	1	2	0	X	X	8
Allan Lyburn	0	0	1	0	2	0	0	1	X	X	4

Team	1	2	3	4	5	6	7	8	9	10	Final
Terry McNamee	0	0	2	0	0	1	0	0	0	0	3
Andrew Wickman	0	1	0	2	0	0	0	0	1	1	5

Team	1	2	3	4	5	6	7	8	9	10	Final
Kelly Marnoch	1	0	0	1	0	1	0	2	0	X	5
Dave Elias	0	1	1	0	2	0	2	0	4	X	10

=== Draw 2 ===
Wednesday, February 10, 12:15 pm

Team	1	2	3	4	5	6	7	8	9	10	Final
David Bohn	0	2	2	0	0	0	1	0	2	0	7
Peter Prokowich	1	0	0	2	0	1	0	3	0	2	9

Team	1	2	3	4	5	6	7	8	9	10	Final
Kevin Larson	0	0	0	1	0	1	0	1	X	X	3
Kerry Burtnyk	1	0	2	0	2	0	2	0	X	X	7

Team	1	2	3	4	5	6	7	8	9	10	Final
David Hamblin	1	0	2	1	0	0	2	0	2	X	8
Sean Grassie	0	3	0	0	1	3	0	3	0	X	10

Team	1	2	3	4	5	6	7	8	9	10	Final
Doug Riach	0	0	3	0	1	1	0	1	0	3	9
Randy Neufeld	1	0	0	2	0	0	1	0	2	0	6

Team	1	2	3	4	5	6	7	8	9	10	Final
Reid Carruthers	0	0	3	0	1	0	0	1	0	0	5
Andrew Irving	0	0	0	1	0	0	1	0	1	1	4

=== Draw 3 ===
Wednesday, February 10, 4:00 pm

Team	1	2	3	4	5	6	7	8	9	10	Final
Wayne Ewasko	0	1	1	0	0	0	0	0	1	X	3
Jason Gunnlaugson	2	0	0	0	1	1	1	1	0	X	6

Team	1	2	3	4	5	6	7	8	9	10	Final
Dave Boehmer	0	0	1	0	2	0	1	0	X	X	4
Murray Woodward	2	1	0	2	0	2	0	2	X	X	9

Team	1	2	3	4	5	6	7	8	9	10	Final
Brent Scales	0	0	0	0	3	0	1	X	X	X	4
Bob Sigurdson	0	1	0	1	0	4	0	X	X	X	6

Team	1	2	3	4	5	6	7	8	9	10	Final
Jeff Stoughton	0	4	1	1	0	0	0	2	X	X	8
Jim Kirkness	0	0	0	0	1	0	1	0	X	X	2

Team	1	2	3	4	5	6	7	8	9	10	Final
Travis Graham	0	0	0	0	0	0	X	X	X	X	0
Brendan Taylor	0	1	0	1	1	4	X	X	X	X	7

=== Draw 4 ===
Wednesday, February 10, 8:15 pm

Team	1	2	3	4	5	6	7	8	9	10	Final
Randy Dutiaume	0	3	0	2	1	0	0	1	1	1	9
Ryan Hyde	4	0	1	0	0	1	0	0	0	0	6

Team	1	2	3	4	5	6	7	8	9	10	Final
William Lyburn	1	2	0	0	1	0	0	0	0	1	5
Curtis McCannell	0	0	1	1	0	0	2	0	0	0	4

Team	1	2	3	4	5	6	7	8	9	10	Final
Allan Lyburn	1	2	0	0	1	0	4	0	2	X	10
Terry McNamee	0	0	1	1	0	2	0	2	0	X	6

Team	1	2	3	4	5	6	7	8	9	10	Final
Kelly Marnoch	0	0	0	1	1	0	X	X	X	X	2
David Bohn	3	1	0	0	0	5	X	X	X	X	9

Team	1	2	3	4	5	6	7	8	9	10	Final
Kevin Larson	0	2	0	3	0	0	1	0	0	X	6
David Hamblin	0	0	3	0	2	1	0	1	2	X	9

=== Draw 5 ===
Thursday, February 11, 8:30 am

Team	1	2	3	4	5	6	7	8	9	10	Final
Kerry Burtnyk	3	0	0	3	0	3	X	X	X	X	9
Sean Grassie	0	2	0	0	1	0	X	X	X	X	3

Team	1	2	3	4	5	6	7	8	9	10	Final
Doug Riach	0	0	1	0	0	0	X	X	X	X	1
Reid Carruthers	1	3	0	0	1	2	X	X	X	X	7

Team	1	2	3	4	5	6	7	8	9	10	Final
Jason Gunnlaugson	2	0	1	0	2	1	0	1	0	1	8
Murray Woodward	0	1	0	2	0	0	2	0	1	0	6

Team	1	2	3	4	5	6	7	8	9	10	Final
Randy Neufeld	0	0	1	0	2	0	6	2	X	X	11
Andrew Irving	1	1	0	2	0	2	0	0	X	X	6

Team	1	2	3	4	5	6	7	8	9	10	11	Final
Wayne Ewasko	0	0	1	0	1	1	1	0	3	1	0	8
Dave Boehmer	1	3	0	1	0	0	0	3	0	0	2	10

=== Draw 6 ===
Thursday, February 11, 12:15 pm

Sheet D	1	2	3	4	5	6	7	8	9	10	Final
David Kraichy	0	0	0	0	1	0	1	0	0	X	2
Mike McEwen	2	0	1	0	0	2	0	1	1	X	7

Sheet A	1	2	3	4	5	6	7	8	9	10	11	Final
Murray Warren	0	0	1	1	0	2	0	1	1	0	1	7
Andrew Wickman	2	1	0	0	1	0	0	0	0	2	0	6

Sheet B	1	2	3	4	5	6	7	8	9	10	11	Final
Dave Elias	0	1	0	1	0	0	1	1	2	1	0	7
Peter Prokopowich	1	0	2	0	2	2	0	0	0	0	2	9

Sheet E	1	2	3	4	5	6	7	8	9	10	Final
Bob Sigurdson	0	1	0	1	0	1	X	X	X	X	3
Jeff Stoughton	2	0	2	0	3	0	X	X	X	X	7

Sheet D	1	2	3	4	5	6	7	8	9	10	Final
Brendan Taylor	0	0	2	0	1	0	0	0	1	1	5
Randy Dutiaume	2	1	0	0	0	1	0	2	0	0	6

=== Draw 7 ===
Thursday, February 11, 4:00 pm

Sheet A	1	2	3	4	5	6	7	8	9	10	Final
Brent Scales	3	2	2	3	0	3	X	X	X	X	13
Jim Kirkness	0	0	0	0	2	0	X	X	X	X	2

Sheet D	1	2	3	4	5	6	7	8	9	10	Final
Travis Graham	2	2	0	3	0	3	X	X	X	X	10
Ryan Hyde	0	0	1	0	1	0	X	X	X	X	2

Sheet C	1	2	3	4	5	6	7	8	9	10	Final
David Bohn	0	1	0	0	1	1	1	0	3	X	7
Sean Grassie	0	0	1	0	0	0	0	1	0	X	2

Sheet B	1	2	3	4	5	6	7	8	9	10	Final
Dave Boehmer	0	2	0	1	0	0	0	1	1	X	5
Doug Riach	1	0	2	0	3	1	0	0	0	X	7

Team	1	2	3	4	5	6	7	8	9	10	Final
Randy Neufeld	3	3	3	3	0	X	X	X	X	X	12
Murray Woodward	0	0	0	0	0	X	X	X	X	X	0

=== Draw 8 ===
Thursday, February 11, 7:45 pm

Team	1	2	3	4	5	6	7	8	9	10	Final
William Lyburn	1	0	2	3	0	0	0	0	0	X	6
Andrew Wickman	0	0	0	0	0	0	0	1	2	X	3

Team	1	2	3	4	5	6	7	8	9	10	11	Final
Allan Lyburn	0	3	0	0	2	1	0	0	0	0	0	6
David Kraichy	2	0	2	1	0	0	0	0	0	1	1	7

Team	1	2	3	4	5	6	7	8	9	10	Final
David Hamblin	0	3	0	2	0	2	0	X	X	X	7
Dave Elias	0	0	1	0	1	0	1	X	X	X	3

Team	1	2	3	4	5	6	7	8	9	10	Final
Travis Graham	2	0	2	0	3	0	2	0	0	X	9
Bog Sigurdson	0	2	0	2	0	2	0	0	1	X	7

Team	1	2	3	4	5	6	7	8	9	10	Final
Brent Scales	0	1	1	0	0	0	0	1	0	X	3
Brendan Taylor	1	0	0	0	2	2	0	0	1	X	6

=== Draw 9 ===
Friday, February 12, 8:30 am

Sheet A	1	2	3	4	5	6	7	8	9	10	Final
Peter Prokopowich	0	1	0	1	0	1	0	2	0	0	5
Kerry Burtnyk	0	0	2	0	2	0	1	0	0	1	6

Sheet B	1	2	3	4	5	6	7	8	9	10	Final
Jeff Stoughton	3	0	0	3	0	2	X	X	X	X	8
Randy Dutiaume	0	1	1	0	1	0	X	X	X	X	3

Sheet C	1	2	3	4	5	6	7	8	9	10	Final
Mike McEwen	0	0	2	1	0	5	X	X	X	X	8
Murray Warren	0	1	0	0	1	0	X	X	X	X	2

Sheet D	1	2	3	4	5	6	7	8	9	10	Final
Reid Carruthers	0	0	1	0	2	0	2	2	0	1	7
Jason Gunnlaugson	0	3	0	2	0	2	0	0	3	0	10

=== Draw 10 ===
Friday, February 12, 12:15 pm

Sheet B	1	2	3	4	5	6	7	8	9	10	Final
Brendan Taylor	0	0	0	2	0	3	0	0	1	X	6
Travis Graham	0	0	1	0	1	0	1	0	0	X	3

Sheet E	1	2	3	4	5	6	7	8	9	10	Final
David Bohn	0	1	0	0	3	0	1	0	0	X	5
David Hamblin	2	0	1	2	0	1	0	1	1	X	8

Sheet D	1	2	3	4	5	6	7	8	9	10	Final
Randy Neufeld	2	0	0	0	2	0	0	0	3	X	7
Doug Riach	0	0	1	0	0	3	0	1	0	X	5

Sheet C	1	2	3	4	5	6	7	8	9	10	Final
William Lyburn	0	2	0	0	1	0	0	2	0	X	5
Allan Lyburn	1	0	0	1	0	1	3	0	2	X	8

=== Draw 11 ===
Friday, February 12, 4:00 pm

Team	1	2	3	4	5	6	7	8	9	10	Final
Allan Lyburn	0	0	1	0	1	1	1	1	0	3	8
Murray Warren	1	0	0	2	0	0	0	0	2	0	5

Team	1	2	3	4	5	6	7	8	9	10	Final
David Hamblin	0	2	1	0	3	1	0	1	X	X	8
Peter Prokowich	1	0	0	1	0	0	1	0	X	X	3

Team	1	2	3	4	5	6	7	8	9	10	11	Final
Randy Neufeld	0	2	0	0	1	0	0	0	2	0	1	6
Reid Carruthers	0	0	1	1	0	0	1	1	0	1	0	5

Team	1	2	3	4	5	6	7	8	9	10	Final
Brendan Taylor	1	0	1	1	0	2	0	1	0	0	6
Randy Dutiaume	0	1	0	0	1	0	1	0	1	1	5

== Playoff Brackets ==
8 team double knockout
Four teams qualify into Championship round

=== A event ===
First Knockout
Q1	Mike McEwen	8
Q6	David Hamblin	4
Q2	Kerry Burtnyk	11
Q5	Allan Lyburn	8

Qualifier 1
Q1	Mike McEwen	6
Q2	Kerry Burtnyk	3

First Knockout
Q3	Jason Gunnlaugson	9
Q8	Brendan Taylor	6
Q4	Jeff Stoughton	6
Q7	Randy Neufeld	2

Qualifier 2
Q3	Jason Gunnlaugson	6
Q4	Jeff Stoughton	9

=== B event ===
Second Knockout			Qualifier 3
			Q3	Jason Gunnlaugson	8
Q6	David Hamblin	12	Q6	David Hamblin	5
Q5	Allan Lyburn	10

Second Knockout			Qualifier 4
			Q2	Kerry Burtnyk	7
Q8	Brendan Taylor	10	Q8	Brendan Taylor	2
Q7	Randy Neufeld	6

== Playoff Results ==
=== Draw 12 ===
Friday, February 12, 7:45 pm

Team	1	2	3	4	5	6	7	8	9	10	Final
Mike McEwen	3	0	2	1	0	0	1	0	1	X	8
David Hamblin	0	1	0	0	1	1	0	1	0	X	4

Team	1	2	3	4	5	6	7	8	9	10	Final
Kerry Burtnyk	1	0	2	0	1	0	3	1	0	3	11
Allan Lyburn	0	2	0	2	0	3	0	0	1	0	8

Team	1	2	3	4	5	6	7	8	9	10	Final
Jason Gunnlaugson	2	0	1	0	1	0	2	0	3	X	9
Brendan Taylor	0	1	0	2	0	1	0	2	0	X	6

Team	1	2	3	4	5	6	7	8	9	10	Final
Jeff Stoughton	1	1	0	4	0	X	X	X	X	X	6
Randy Neufeld	0	0	1	0	1	X	X	X	X	X	2

=== Draw 13 ===
Saturday, February 13, 9:00 am

Team	1	2	3	4	5	6	7	8	9	10	Final
Mike McEwen	0	2	1	0	0	1	0	0	2	X	6
Kerry Burtnyk	1	0	0	1	0	0	0	1	0	X	3

Team	1	2	3	4	5	6	7	8	9	10	Final
Jason Gunnlaugson	0	2	0	1	0	1	0	0	2	0	6
Jeff Stoughton	1	0	2	0	3	0	2	0	0	1	9

Team	1	2	3	4	5	6	7	8	9	10	11	Final
David Hamblin	0	4	0	1	1	0	3	0	1	0	2	12
Allan Lyburn	2	0	1	0	0	2	0	3	0	2	0	10

Team	1	2	3	4	5	6	7	8	9	10	Final
Brendan Taylor	0	2	0	1	2	0	4	0	1	X	10
Randy Neufeld	1	0	2	0	0	1	0	2	0	X	6

=== Draw 14 ===
Saturday, February 13, 2:00 pm

Team	1	2	3	4	5	6	7	8	9	10	Final
David Hamblin	1	0	1	1	0	1	0	1	X	X	5
Jason Gunnlaugson	0	2	0	0	4	0	2	0	X	X	8

Team	1	2	3	4	5	6	7	8	9	10	Final
Brendan Taylor	0	0	0	0	0	1	1	0	X	X	2
Kerry Burtnyk	0	1	0	1	3	0	0	2	X	X	7

== Championship Round ==
Page playoff system
1	Jeff Stoughton	5
2	Mike McEwen	7
3	Jason Gunnlaugson	4
4	Kerry Burtnyk	5

Semifinal
1	Jeff Stoughton	6
4	Kerry Burtnyk	4

Final
2	Mike McEwen	8
1	Jeff Stoughton	9

=== 1 vs. 2 ===
Saturday, February 13, 7:00 pm

Team	1	2	3	4	5	6	7	8	9	10	Final
Jeff Stoughton	0	0	1	0	2	0	0	2	0	x	5
Mike McEwen	1	1	0	2	0	1	0	0	2	x	7

=== 3 vs. 4 ===
Saturday, February 13, 7:00 pm

Team	1	2	3	4	5	6	7	8	9	10	Final
Jason Gunnlaugson	1	0	1	0	0	1	0	1	0	0	4
Kerry Burtnyk	0	0	0	1	1	0	1	0	0	2	5

=== Semifinal ===
Sunday, February 14, 9:30 am

Team	1	2	3	4	5	6	7	8	9	10	Final
Kerry Burtnyk	0	2	0	0	1	0	0	1	0	x	4
Jeff Stoughton	0	0	2	1	0	2	0	0	1	x	6

=== Final ===
Sunday, February 14, 2:00 pm

Team	1	2	3	4	5	6	7	8	9	10	11	Final
Mike McEwen	0	0	2	0	2	0	2	0	0	2	0	8
Jeff Stoughton🔨	1	2	0	2	0	2	0	1	0	0	1	9

2010 Safeway Championship

Jeff Stoughton
8th Manitoba Provincial Championship title

== Awards ==
All-Star Team

- Skip - Jeff Stoughton, Team Stoughton
- Third - B.J. Neufeld, Team McEwen
- Second - Matt Wozniak, Team McEwen
- Lead - Denni Neufeld, Team McEwen
