= 2012 Canad Inns Prairie Classic =

- Host city: Portage la Prairie, Manitoba
- Arena: Portage Curling Club
- Dates: October 19–22
- Winner: (Alberta) Kevin Koe
- Curling club: Glencoe CC, Calgary
- Skip: Kevin Koe
- Third: Pat SImmons
- Second: Carter Rycroft
- Lead: Nolan Thiessen
- Finalist: (Alberta) Kevin Martin

The 2012 Canad Inns Prairie Classic was held from October 19 to 22 at the Portage Curling Club in Portage la Prairie, Manitoba as part of the 2012–13 World Curling Tour. The event was held in a triple knockout format, and the purse for the event was CAD $58,000, of which the winner, Kevin Koe, received CAD$18,000. Koe defeated Alberta rival Kevin Martin in the final with a score of 9–4.

== Teams ==
The teams are listed as follows:

Skip	Third	Second	Lead	Locale
Dave Boehmer	William Kuran	Shawn Magnusson		Petersfield, Manitoba
David Bohn				Winnipeg, Manitoba
Tom Brewster	Greg Drummond	Scott Andrews	Michael Goodfellow	Aberdeen, Scotland
Randy Dutiaume	Peter Nicholls	Dean Moxham	Greg Melnichuk	Winnipeg, Manitoba
Niklas Edin	Sebastian Kraupp	Fredrik Lindberg	Viktor Kjäll	Karlstad, Sweden
Dave Elias	Kevin Thompson	Hubert Perrin	Chris Suchy	Winnipeg, Manitoba
John Epping	Scott Bailey	Scott Howard	David Mathers	Toronto, Ontario
Eric Fenson	Trevor Andrews	Blake Morton	Calvin Weber	Bemidji, Minnesota
Rob Fowler	Allan Lyburn	Richard Daneault	Derek Samagalski	Brandon, Manitoba
Sean Grassie	Corey Chambers	Kody Janzen	Stuart Shiells	Winnipeg, Manitoba
Brad Gushue	Adam Casey	Brett Gallant	Geoff Walker	St. John's, Newfoundland and Labrador
Jeff Hartung	Kody Hartung	Tyler Hartung	Claire DeCock	Langenburg, Saskatchewan
Glenn Howard	Wayne Middaugh	Brent Laing	Craig Savill	Coldwater, Ontario
Ryan Hyde				Portage la Prairie, Manitoba
Joel Jordison	Jason Ackerman	Brent Goeres	Curtis Horwath	Moose Jaw, Saskatchewan
Mark Kean	Travis Fanset	Patrick Janssen	Tim March	Toronto, Ontario
Kevin Koe	Pat Simmons	Carter Rycroft	Nolan Thiessen	Edmonton, Alberta
Jared Kolomaya	Neil Katching	Kennedy Bird	Daniel Hunt	Stonewall, Manitoba
Steve Laycock	Kirk Muyres	Colton Flasch	Dallan Muyres	Saskatoon, Saskatchewan
Liu Rui	Xu Xiaoming	Zang Jialiang	Ba Dexin	Harbin, China
William Lyburn	James Kirkness	Alex Forrest	Tyler Forrest	Winnipeg, Manitoba
Scott Madams	Braden Zawada	Ian Fordyce	Nigel Milnes	Winnipeg, Manitoba
Kevin Martin	John Morris	Marc Kennedy	Ben Hebert	Edmonton, Alberta
Heath McCormick	Matt Hames	Bill Stopera	Dean Gemmell	(New York (state)) New York City, New York
Jack McDonald	Barry Paddock	Rodney Legault	Barrie Troop	Winnipeg, Manitoba
Mike McEwen	B.J. Neufeld	Matt Wozniak	Denni Neufeld	Winnipeg, Manitoba
Terry McNamee	Steve Irwin	Travis Taylor	Travis Saban	Brandon, Manitoba
Daley Peters	Chris Galbraith	Kyle Einarson	Mike Neufeld	Winnipeg, Manitoba
Scott Ramsay	Mark Taylor	Ross McFayden	Kyle Werenich	Winnipeg, Manitoba
Jeremy Roe	Steve Day	Richard Maskel	Mark Hartman	Madison, Wisconsin
Jeff Stoughton	Jon Mead	Reid Carruthers	Mark Nichols	Winnipeg, Manitoba
Zou Dejia	Chen Lu'an	Ji Yangsong	Li Guangxu	Harbin, China

== Knockout results ==
The draw is listed as follows:

=== A event ===
First Knockout
(Scotland) Tom Brewster	5
(Manitoba) Daley Peters	8
(Newfoundland and Labrador) Brad Gushue	8
(Minnesota) Eric Fenson	2
(Ontario) Glenn Howard	8
(Manitoba) Jack McDonald	3
(China) Zou Dejia	8
(Manitoba) Terry McNamee	2
(Sweden) Niklas Edin	9
(Manitoba) Ryan Hyde	2
(Saskatchewan) Steve Laycock	2
(Manitoba) William Lyburn	3
(Ontario) John Epping	5
(Manitoba) David Bohn	7
(Saskatchewan) Joel Jordison	5
(New York (state)) Heath McCormick	8

Quarterfinals
(Manitoba) Daley Peters	2
(Newfoundland and Labrador) Brad Gushue	7
(Ontario) Glenn Howard	8
(China) Zou Dejia	2
(Sweden) Niklas Edin	5
(Manitoba) William Lyburn	6
(Manitoba) David Bohn	3
(New York (state)) Heath McCormick	6

Semifinals
(Newfoundland and Labrador) Brad Gushue	5
(Ontario) Glenn Howard	3
(Manitoba) William Lyburn	7
(New York (state)) Heath McCormick	4

Qualifier 1
(Newfoundland and Labrador) Brad Gushue	8
(Manitoba) William Lyburn	5

First Knockout
(Ontario) Mark Kean	6
(Manitoba) Dave Boehmer	2
(Manitoba) Jeff Stoughton	9
(Wisconsin) Jeremy Roe	2
(Alberta) Kevin Martin	7
(Manitoba) Dave Elias	2
(Saskatchewan) Jeff Hartung	4
(Manitoba) Sean Grassie	6
(Alberta) Kevin Koe	7
(Manitoba) Scott Ramsay	1
(Manitoba) Rob Fowler	6
(Manitoba) Scott Madams	2
(Manitoba) Mike McEwen	5
(Manitoba) Jared Kolomaya	3
(China) Liu Rui	5
(Manitoba) Randy Dutiaume	6

Quarterfinals
(Ontario) Mark Kean	0
(Manitoba) Jeff Stoughton	5
(Alberta) Kevin Martin	7
(Manitoba) Sean Grassie	1
(Alberta) Kevin Koe	5
(Manitoba) Rob Fowler	7
(Manitoba) Mike McEwen	4
(Manitoba) Randy Dutiaume	2

Semifinals
(Manitoba) Jeff Stoughton	7
(Alberta) Kevin Martin	4
(Manitoba) Rob Fowler	5
(Manitoba) Mike McEwen	6

Qualifier 2
(Manitoba) Jeff Stoughton	6
(Manitoba) Mike McEwen	4

=== B event ===
Second Knockout
(Scotland) Tom Brewster	9
(Minnesota) Eric Fenson	5
(Manitoba) Terry McNamee	12
(Manitoba) Jack McDonald	1

Quarterfinals
(Manitoba) David Bohn	8
(Scotland) Tom Brewster	4
(Sweden) Niklas Edin	6
(Manitoba) Terry McNamee	4

Semifinals
(Manitoba) David Bohn	2
(Alberta) Kevin Martin	6
(Sweden) Niklas Edin	5
(Manitoba) Rob Fowler	6

To Qualifier 3
(Alberta) Kevin Martin	5
(Manitoba) Rob Fowler	4
Qualifier 3
(Alberta) Kevin Martin	1
(Manitoba) Mike McEwen	7

Second Knockout
(Manitoba) Ryan Hyde	2
(Saskatchewan) Steve Laycock	5
(Ontario) John Epping	10
(Saskatchewan) Joel Jordison	6

Quarterfinals
(China) Zou Dejia	2
(Saskatchewan) Steve Laycock	6
(Manitoba) Daley Peters	0
(Ontario) John Epping	9

Semifinals
(Saskatchewan) Steve Laycock	3
(Ontario) John Epping	8

To Qualifier 3
(Ontario) John Epping	2
(Manitoba) Mike McEwen	6

Second Knockout
(Manitoba) Dave Boehmer	7
(Wisconsin) Jeremy Roe	1
(Manitoba) Dave Elias	7
(Saskatchewan) Jeff Hartung	1

Quarterfinals
(Manitoba) Randy Dutiaume	4
(Manitoba) Dave Boehmer	5
(Alberta) Kevin Koe	9
(Manitoba) Dave Elias	6

Semifinals
(Manitoba) Dave Boehmer	2
(Ontario) Glenn Howard	7
(Alberta) Kevin Koe	5
(New York (state)) Heath McCormick	3

To Qualifier 4
(Ontario) Glenn Howard	6
(Alberta) Kevin Koe	5
Qualifier 4
(Ontario) Glenn Howard	6
(Manitoba) William Lyburn	3

Second Knockout
(Manitoba) Scott Ramsay	1
(Manitoba) Scott Madams	8
(Manitoba) Jared Kolomaya	4
(China) Liu Rui	8

Quarterfinals
(Manitoba) Sean Grassie	7
(Manitoba) Scott Madams	1
(Ontario) Mark Kean	5
(China) Liu Rui	3

Semifinals
(Manitoba) Sean Grassie	6
(Ontario) Mark Kean	7

To Qualifier 4
(Ontario) Mark Kean	2
(Manitoba) William Lyburn	5

=== C event ===
Third Knockout
(Minnesota) Eric Fenson	5
(Manitoba) Jack McDonald	7
(Saskatchewan) Joel Jordison	3
(Manitoba) Ryan Hyde	5

Quarterfinals
(Manitoba) Dave Boehmer	7
(Manitoba) Jack McDonald	1
(New York (state)) Heath McCormick	7
(Manitoba) Ryan Hyde	6

Semifinals
(Manitoba) Dave Boehmer	4
(New York (state)) Heath McCormick	8

Qualifier 5
(New York (state)) Heath McCormick	2
(Alberta) Kevin Martin	8

Third Knockout
(Scotland) Tom Brewster	5
(Manitoba) Terry McNamee	8

Quarterfinals
(China) Zou Dejia	7
(Manitoba) Daley Peters	1
(Manitoba) Sean Grassie	4
(Manitoba) Terry McNamee	3

Semifinals
(China) Zou Dejia	1
(Manitoba) Rob Fowler	9
(Manitoba) Sean Grassie	4
(Ontario) John Epping	7

Qualifier 6
(Manitoba) Rob Fowler	5
(Ontario) John Epping	6

Third Knockout
(Manitoba) Randy Dutiaume	8
(Manitoba) Dave Elias	1

Quarterfinals
(Manitoba) David Bohn	5
(Manitoba) Randy Dutiaume	6
(Manitoba) Scott Madams	6
(China) Liu Rui	7

Semifinals
(Manitoba) Randy Dutiaume	4
(Ontario) Mark Kean	6
(China) Liu Rui	2
(Alberta) Kevin Koe	8

Qualifier 7
(Ontario) Mark Kean	3
(Alberta) Kevin Koe	5

Third Knockout
(Wisconsin) Jeremy Roe	1
(Saskatchewan) Jeff Hartung	7
(Manitoba) Scott Ramsay	7
(Manitoba) Jared Kolomaya	3

Quarterfinals
(Sweden) Niklas Edin	6
(Saskatchewan) Jeff Hartung	5
(Saskatchewan) Steve Laycock	7
(Manitoba) Scott Ramsay	5

Semifinals
(Sweden) Niklas Edin	6
(Saskatchewan) Steve Laycock	3

Qualifier 8
(Sweden) Niklas Edin	5
(Manitoba) William Lyburn	6

== Playoffs ==
Quarterfinals
(Newfoundland and Labrador) Brad Gushue	5
(Alberta) Kevin Martin	8
(Ontario) Glenn Howard	7
(Ontario) John Epping	6
(Manitoba) Mike McEwen	4
(Alberta) Kevin Koe	5
(Manitoba) Jeff Stoughton	9
(Manitoba) William Lyburn	1

Semifinals
(Alberta) Kevin Martin	4
(Ontario) Glenn Howard	2
(Alberta) Kevin Koe	5
(Manitoba) Jeff Stoughton	3

Final
(Alberta) Kevin Martin	4
(Alberta) Kevin Koe	9
