= 2011 DEKALB Superspiel (November) =

- Host city: Morris, Manitoba
- Arena: Morris Curling Club
- Dates: November 24–27
- Men's winner: (Saskatchewan) Braeden Moskowy
- Curling club: Callie CC, Regina, Saskatchewan
- Skip: Braeden Moskowy
- Third: Kirk Muyres
- Second: D.J. Kidby
- Lead: Dustin Kidby
- Finalist: (Manitoba) William Lyburn
- Women's winner: (Manitoba) Barb Spencer
- Curling club: Assiniboine Memorial CC; Winnipeg, Manitoba
- Skip: Barb Spencer
- Third: Karen Klein
- Second: Ainsley Champagne
- Lead: Raunora Westcott
- Finalist: (Manitoba) Lisa DeRiviere

The 2011 DEKALB Superspiel was held November 24 to 27 at the Morris Curling Club in Morris, Manitoba, as part of the 2011–12 World Curling Tour. The event featured 16 men's teams and 15 women's teams competing in a triple knockout format. The purses for the event were CAD$30,000 for the men's event and CAD$24,000 for the women's event.

== Men ==
=== Teams ===
Skip	Third	Second	Lead	Locale
Daniel Birchard	Kelly Fordyce	Brody Moore	Andrew Pech	Manitoba
David Bohn	Andrew Irving	Dennis Bohn	Larry Solomon	Winnipeg, Manitoba
Brendan Bottcher	Bradley Thiessen	Micky Lizmore	Karrick Martin	Edmonton, Alberta
Jim Coleman	A.J Girardin	Brad Van Walleghem	Shane Halliburton	Winnipeg, Manitoba
Carl deConinck Smith	Jeff Sharp	Chris Haichert	Jesse St. John	Rosetown, Saskatchewan
Randy Dutiaume	Peter Nicholls	Dean Moxham	Wayne Sigurdson	Winnipeg, Manitoba
Rob Fowler	Allan Lyburn	Richard Daneault	Derek Samagalski	Brandon, Manitoba
Chris Galbraith	Travis Bale	Bryan Galbraith	Rodney Legault	Winnipeg, Manitoba
Sean Grassie	Corey Chambers	Kody Janzen	Stuart Shiells	Winnipeg, Manitoba
Mark Hadway	Rob Fischer	Gord Wood	Jason Beyette	Dauphin, Manitoba
David Hamblin	Kevin Hamblin	Kyle Einarson	Mike Neufeld	Morris, Manitoba
Tom Hyde	Neil Jordan	Ray Faith	Cam Scott	Portage la Prairie, Manitoba
William Lyburn	James Kirkness	Alex Forrest	Tyler Forrest	Winnipeg, Manitoba
Braeden Moskowy	Kirk Muyres	D.J. Kidby	Dustin Kidby	Regina, Saskatchewan
Dean North	Darcy Hayward	Bill North, Jr.	Warren McCutcheon	Carman, Manitoba
Daley Peters (fourth)	Vic Peters (skip)	Brendan Taylor	Kyle Werenich	Winnipeg, Manitoba

=== Knockout results ===
==== A event ====
First Knockout
(Manitoba) Rob Fowler	8
(Manitoba) Dean North	2
(Manitoba) David Hamblin	6
(Manitoba) Chris Galbraith	2
(Manitoba) Vic Peters	6
(Manitoba) Daniel Birchard	5
(Manitoba) Randy Dutiaume	2
(Saskatchewan) Braeden Moskowy	6

Semifinals
(Manitoba) Rob Fowler	6
(Manitoba) David Hamblin	4
(Manitoba) Vic Peters	3
(Saskatchewan) Braeden Moskowy	5

Qualifier 1
(Manitoba) Rob Fowler	5
(Saskatchewan) Braeden Moskowy	8

First Knockout
(Manitoba) Sean Grassie	8
(Manitoba) Tom Hyde	4
(Alberta) Brendan Bottcher	4
(Manitoba) William Lyburn	8
(Manitoba) David Bohn	8
(Manitoba) Jim Coleman	4
(Manitoba) Mark Hadway	2
(Saskatchewan) Carl deConinck Smith	7

Semifinals
(Manitoba) Sean Grassie	3
(Manitoba) William Lyburn	5
(Manitoba) David Bohn	3
(Saskatchewan) Carl deConinck Smith	6

Qualifier 2
(Manitoba) William Lyburn	6
(Saskatchewan) Carl deConinck Smith	5

==== B event ====
Quarterfinals		Semifinals		Qualifier 3
(Manitoba) Dean North	6
(Manitoba) Chris Galbraith	5	(Manitoba) Dean North	6
(Manitoba) Daniel Birchard	6	(Manitoba) Daniel Birchard	3
(Manitoba) Randy Dutiaume	5			(Manitoba) Dean North	1
				(Saskatchewan) Carl deConinck Smith	8

Quarterfinals		Semifinals		Qualifier 4
(Manitoba) Tom Hyde	2
(Alberta) Brendan Bottcher	6	(Alberta) Brendan Bottcher	6
(Manitoba) Jim Coleman	7	(Manitoba) Jim Coleman	5
(Manitoba) Mark Hadway	5			(Alberta) Brendan Bottcher	1
				(Manitoba) Rob Fowler	7

Semifinals		Qualifier 5
(Manitoba) David Hamblin	6
(Manitoba) Vic Peters	7	(Manitoba) Vic Peters	1
(Manitoba) Sean Grassie	7	(Manitoba) Sean Grassie	6
(Manitoba) David Bohn	4

==== C event ====
Quarterfinals		Semifinals		Qualifier 6
		(Manitoba) Chris Galbraith	3
(Manitoba) Chris Galbraith	4	(Manitoba) David Bohn	5
(Manitoba) Randy Dutiaume	3			(Manitoba) David Bohn	8
				(Alberta) Brendan Bottcher	2

Quarterfinals		Semifinals		Qualifier 7
		(Manitoba) Mark Hadway	5
(Manitoba) Tom Hyde	5	(Manitoba) David Hamblin	4
(Manitoba) Mark Hadway	6			(Manitoba) Mark Hadway	0
				(Manitoba) Dean North	7

Semifinals			Qualifier 8
			1	(Manitoba) Daniel Birchard	7
2	(Manitoba) Daniel Birchard	5		(Manitoba) Vic Peters	6
3	(Manitoba) Jim Coleman	2

=== Playoffs ===
Quarterfinal
(Saskatchewan) Braeden Moskowy	6
(Manitoba) Dean North	4
(Saskatchewan) Carl deConinck Smith	6
(Manitoba) Daniel Birchard	8
(Manitoba) William Lyburn	7
(Manitoba) David Bohn	0
(Manitoba) Rob Fowler	4
(Manitoba) Sean Grassie	6

Semifinal
(Saskatchewan) Braeden Moskowy	8
(Manitoba) Daniel Birchard	4
(Manitoba) William Lyburn	6
(Manitoba) Sean Grassie	4

Final
(Saskatchewan) Braeden Moskowy	8
(Manitoba) William Lyburn	5

== Women ==
=== Teams ===
Skip	Third	Second	Lead	Locale
Joelle Brown	Tracey Lavery	Susan Baleja	Jennifer Cawson	Winnipeg, Manitoba
Chelsea Carey	Kristy McDonald	Kristen Foster	Lindsay Titheridge	Morden, Manitoba
Lisa DeRiviere	Jolene Rutter	Heather Pearson	Alicia Pearson	Winnipeg, Manitoba
Janet Harvey	Cherie-Ann Loder	Kristin Loder	Carey Kirby	Winnipeg, Manitoba
Kim Link	Maureen Bonar	Colleen Kilgallen	Renee Fletcher	East St. Paul, Manitoba
Deb McCreanor	Ashley Meakin	Stephanie Armstrong-Craplewe	Laurie Macdonell	La Salle, Manitoba
Michelle Montford	Courtney Blanchard	Sara Jones	Sarah Norget	Winnipeg, Manitoba
Cathy Overton-Clapham	Jenna Loder	Ashley Howard	Breanne Meakin	Winnipeg, Manitoba
Darcy Robertson	Calleen Neufeld	Vanessa Foster	Michelle Kruk	Winnipeg, Manitoba
Karen Rosser	Cheryl Reed	Stacey Fordyce	Brenna Philp	Dugald, Manitoba
Erika Sigurdson	Heather Maxted	Laura Budowsky	Meghan Knutson	Stonewall, Manitoba
Barb Spencer	Karen Klein	Ainsley Champagne	Raunora Westcott	Winnipeg, Manitoba
Jill Thurston	Kerri Einarson	Kendra Georges	Sarah Wazney	Winnipeg, Manitoba
Terry Ursel	Wanda Rainka	Kendell Kohinski	Brenda Walker	Plumas, Manitoba
Kate Cameron (fourth)	Alyssa Vandepoele (skip)	Abby Ackland	Sheyna Andries	Winnipeg, Manitoba

=== Knockout results ===
==== A-Event ====
First Knockout
(Manitoba) Cathy Overton-Clapham	5
(Manitoba) Erika Sigurdson	4
(Manitoba) Lisa DeRiviere	7
(Manitoba) Darcy Robertson	3
(Manitoba) Janet Harvey	7
(Manitoba) Deb McCreanor	3
(Manitoba) Joelle Brown	4
(Manitoba) Jill Thurston	7

Semifinals
(Manitoba) Cathy Overton-Clapham	7
(Manitoba) Lisa DeRiviere	2
(Manitoba) Janet Harvey	4
(Manitoba) Jill Thurston	3

Qualifier 1
(Manitoba) Cathy Overton-Clapham	7
(Manitoba) Janet Harvey	8

First Knockout		Semifinals		Qualifier 2
(Manitoba) Barb Spencer	9
(Manitoba) Terry Ursel	4	(Manitoba) Barb Spencer	14
(Manitoba) Michelle Montford	9	(Manitoba) Michelle Montford	0
(Manitoba) Kim Link	6			(Manitoba) Barb Spencer	7
(Manitoba) Karen Rosser	8			(Manitoba) Chelsea Carey	1
(Manitoba) Alyssa Vandepoele	5	(Manitoba) Karen Rosser	2
		(Manitoba) Chelsea Carey	7

==== B-Event ====
Quarterfinals		Semifinals		Qualifier 3
(Manitoba) Erika Sigurdson	4
(Manitoba) Darcy Robertson	3	(Manitoba) Erika Sigurdson	3
(Manitoba) Deb McCreanor	5	(Manitoba) Joelle Brown	2
(Manitoba) Joelle Brown	6			(Manitoba) Erika Sigurdson	3
				(Manitoba) Chelsea Carey	8

Quarterfinals		Semifinals		Qualifier 4
(Manitoba) Terry Ursel	4
(Manitoba) Kim Link	8	(Manitoba) Kim Link	8
		(Manitoba) Alyssa Vandepoele	2
				(Manitoba) Kim Link	1
				(Manitoba) Cathy Overton-Clapham	8

Semifinals		Qualifier 5
(Manitoba) Lisa DeRiviere	1
(Manitoba) Jill Thurston	10	(Manitoba) Jill Thurston	2
(Manitoba) Michelle Montford	9	(Manitoba) Michelle Montford	3
(Manitoba) Karen Rosser	4

==== C-Event ====
Quarterfinals		Semifinals		Qualifier 6
		(Manitoba) Darcy Robertson	7
(Manitoba) Darcy Robertson	6	(Manitoba) Karen Rosser	6
(Manitoba) Deb McCreanor	5			(Manitoba) Darcy Robertson	5
				(Manitoba) Kim Link	6

Semifinals			Qualifier 7
			1	(Manitoba) Lisa DeRiviere	5
2	(Manitoba) Terry Ursel	3		(Manitoba) Erika Sigurdson	4
3	(Manitoba) Lisa DeRiviere	6

Semifinals			Qualifier 8
			1	(Manitoba) Joelle Brown	1
2	(Manitoba) Joelle Brown	6		(Manitoba) Jill Thurston	7
3	(Manitoba) Alyssa Vandepoele	4

=== Playoffs ===
Quarterfinal
(Manitoba) Janet Harvey	5
(Manitoba) Lisa DeRiviere	6
(Manitoba) Chelsea Carey	3
(Manitoba) Jill Thurston	6
(Manitoba) Barb Spencer	5
(Manitoba) Kim Link	3
(Manitoba) Michelle Montford	1
(Manitoba) Cathy Overton-Clapham	5

Semifinal
(Manitoba) Lisa DeRiviere	7
(Manitoba) Jill Thurston	4
(Manitoba) Barb Spencer	6
(Manitoba) Cathy Overton-Clapham	3

Final
(Manitoba) Lisa DeRiviere	2
(Manitoba) Barb Spencer	4
