= 2013 Safeway Championship =

- Host city: Neepawa, Manitoba
- Arena: Yellowhead Centre
- Dates: February 6–10
- Winner: Team Stoughton
- Curling club: Charleswood CC, Winnipeg
- Skip: Jeff Stoughton
- Third: Jon Mead
- Second: Reid Carruthers
- Lead: Mark Nichols
- Alternate: Garth Smith
- Finalist: Sean Grassie

The 2013 Safeway Championship was held from February 6 to 10 at the Yellowhead Centre in Neepawa, Manitoba. The winning Jeff Stoughton rink represented Manitoba at the 2013 Tim Hortons Brier in Edmonton, Alberta.

== Teams ==
Skip	Third	Second	Lead	Alternate	Club
Rene Kolly	Robert Van Deynze	Don Stewart	Robert Espenell	Dale Evans	Manitou
Geoff Trimble	Dean Smith	Darren Pennell	Alan Christison	Henry Verhoeven	Gladstone
Brendan Taylor	Justin Richter	Taren Gesell	Jared Litke		Beausejour
Wayne Ewasko	Randal Thomas	Dave Beaudoin	Gord Stelmack	Cory Anderson	Beausejour
Shawn Magnusson	Kevin Vigfusson	Aaron Magnusson	Gary Johannesson		Riverton
Jared Kolomaya	Neil Kitching	Kennedy Bird	Daniel Hunt		Stonewall
Travis Graham	Jon Sawatzky	Shaun Kennedy	Jeff Ziemanski	Murray Cameron	Snow Lake
Grant Brown	Rae Hainstock	Gerry Haight	Alex Sutherland		Burntwood
Greg Todoruk	Dwight Bottrell	Darcy Todoruk	Barret Procyshyn	Jim Todoruk	Dauphin
Rae Kujanpaa	Ray Baker	Bob Alm	Terry Gudmundson	Stephen Paradis	Dauphin
Graham Freeman	Kevin Barkley	Cory Barkley	Dwayne Barkley	Jason Lewis	Virden
Kelly Robertson	Doug Armour	Peter Prokopowich	Bob Scales		Neepawa
Blair Goethals	Barry Sunaert	Dale Goethals	Dean Laval	Don Williams	Deloraine
David Kraichy	Andrew Irving	Brad Van Walleghem	Curtis Atkins		Fort Rouge
Bob Sigurdson	Darren Oryniak	Alan Purdy	Chad Barkman	Wayne Sigurdson	West Kildonan
Dennis Bohn	David Bohn	Danial Gagne	Cory Wolchuk		Assiniboine Memorial
Scott Madams	Braden Zawada	Ian Fordyce	Nigel Milnes		Fort Rouge
Bruce Jones	Dave Lemoine	Ash Toews	Hank Lemoine	Rick Lemoine	St. Vital
Sean Grassie	Corey Chambers	Kody Janzen	Stu Shiells		Deer Lodge
Trevor Loreth	Brad Haigh	Ryan Lowdon	Brett Cawson	Bart Witherspoon	West Kildonan
Jerry Chudley	Kevin Cooley	Brent McKee	Paul Robertson	Jason Vinnell	Neepawa
Terry McNamee	Steve Irwin	Travis Taylor	Travis Saban	Brandon Jorgenson	Brandon
Daley Peters	Chris Galbraith	Kyle Einarson	Mike Neufeld		Gimli
Rob Fowler	Allan Lyburn	Richard Daneault	Derek Samagalski		Brandon
Mike McEwen	B. J. Neufeld	Matt Wozniak	Denni Neufeld		Fort Rouge
Jeff Stoughton	Jon Mead	Reid Carruthers	Mark Nichols	Garth Smith	Charleswood
William Lyburn	James Kirkness	Alex Forrest	Tyler Forrest		Deer Lodge
Scott Ramsay	Mark Taylor	Ross McFadyen	Kyle Werenich		Granite
Mark Lukowich	Stu Gresham	Chris Chimuk	Kevin Wiebe		West Kildonan
Rob Van Kommer	Joey Witherspoon	Cale Dunbar	Ian Scott	Todd Witherspoon	Carberry
Dave Elias	Kevin Thompson	Hubert Perrin	Chris Suchy		West St. Paul
Steen Sigurdson	Riley Smith	Ian McMillan	Nick Curtis	Andrew McMillan	Fort Rouge

== Knockout Brackets ==
32 team double knockout with playoff round
Four teams qualify each from A Event and B Event

=== A Event ===
First Knockout	Qualifier 1
Scott Madams	7
Jared Kolomaya	9
Jared Kolomaya	6
Mike McEwen	10
Mike McEwen	8
Geoff Trimble	3
Mike McEwen	6
Dennis Bohn	5
Travis Graham	4
Daley Peters	10
Daley Peters	7
Dennis Bohn	11
Dennis Bohn	8
Rob Van Kommer	4

First Knockout	Qualifier 2
Wayne Ewasko	1
Bob Sigurdson	8
Bob Sigurdson	6
Sean Grassie	7
Sean Grassie	11
Blair Goethals	2
Sean Grassie	8
Rob Fowler	4
Grant Brown	2
Rob Fowler	8
Rob Fowler	9
Jerry Chudley	4
David Kraichy	6
Jerry Chudley	7

First Knockout	Qualifier 3
Steen Sigurdson	7
Kelly Robertson	6
Steen Sigurdson	9
William Lyburn	8
William Lyburn	6
Bruce Jones	3
Steen Sigurdson	7
Terry McNamee	9
Shawn Magnusson	5
Terry McNamee	8
Terry McNamee	10
Brendan Taylor	4
Brendan Taylor	8
Graham Freeman	5

First Knockout	Qualifier 4
Mark Lukowich	6
Trevor Loreth	9
Trevor Loreth	2
Jeff Stoughton	9
Jeff Stoughton	9
Rene Kolly	2
Jeff Stoughton	9
Dave Elias	5
Greg Todoruk	2
Dave Elias	7
Dave Elias	12
Rae Kujanpaa	6
Scott Ramsay	3
Rae Kujanpaa	4

=== B Event ===
Second Knockout	Qualifier 5
Daley Peters	6
Scott Madams	8	Scott Madams	8	Dennis Bohn	9
Geoff Trimble	0	Scott Madams	6	Scott Madams	8
Jared Kolomaya	1
Jared Kolomaya	7
Travis Graham	10	Travis Graham	6
Rob Van Kommer	4

Second Knockout	Qualifier 6
Jerry Chudley	7
Wayne Ewasko	8	Wayne Ewasko	5	Rob Fowler	8
Blair Goethals	7	Jerry Chudley	4	David Kraichy	7
David Kraichy	9
Bob Sigurdson	3
Grant Brown	1	David Kraichy	6
David Kraichy	6

Second Knockout	Qualifier 7
Brendan Taylor	7
Kelly Robertson	7	Kelly Robertson	8	Steen Sigurdson	7
Bruce Jones	4	Kelly Robertson	6	William Lyburn	6
William Lyburn	7
William Lyburn	10
Shawn Magnusson	3	Graham Freeman	3
Graham Freeman	9

Second Knockout	Qualifier 8
Rae Kujanpaa	4
Mark Lukowich	9	Mark Lukowich	11	Dave Elias	5
Rene Kolly	6	Mark Lukowich	2	Scott Ramsay	12
Scott Ramsay	8
Trevor Loreth	7
Greg Todoruk	3	Scott Ramsay	8
Scott Ramsay	10

== Knockout Results ==
All draw times are listed in Central Standard Time (UTC−06:00).

=== Draw 1 ===
Wednesday, February 6, 8:30 am

Sheet A	1	2	3	4	5	6	7	8	9	10	Final
Scott Madams	0	1	0	2	0	2	0	0	2	0	7
Jared Kolomaya	1	0	3	0	2	0	0	2	0	1	9

Sheet B	1	2	3	4	5	6	7	8	9	10	Final
Mike McEwen	2	0	2	1	0	3	0	X	X	X	8
Geoff Trimble	0	0	0	0	2	0	1	X	X	X	3

Sheet C	1	2	3	4	5	6	7	8	9	10	Final
Travis Graham	0	2	1	0	0	0	1	0	0	X	4
Daley Peters	1	0	0	1	2	0	0	2	4	X	10

Sheet D	1	2	3	4	5	6	7	8	9	10	Final
Dennis Bohn	2	0	0	2	0	0	2	0	2	X	8
Rob Van Kommer	0	0	1	0	2	0	0	1	0	X	4

Sheet E	1	2	3	4	5	6	7	8	9	10	Final
Wayne Ewasko	0	0	0	0	0	0	1	0	X	X	1
Bob Sigurdson	0	0	5	1	0	0	0	2	X	X	8

=== Draw 2 ===
Wednesday, February 6, 12:15 pm

Sheet A	1	2	3	4	5	6	7	8	9	10	Final
William Lyburn	0	1	0	0	2	0	1	0	2	X	6
Bruce Jones	0	0	1	0	0	1	0	1	0	X	3

Sheet B	1	2	3	4	5	6	7	8	9	10	Final
Steen Sigurdson	2	0	2	0	1	0	0	1	0	1	7
Kelly Robertson	0	2	0	1	0	2	0	0	1	0	6

Sheet C	1	2	3	4	5	6	7	8	9	10	Final
David Kraichy	0	0	0	1	1	1	0	0	2	1	6
Jerry Chudley	0	2	2	0	0	0	2	1	0	0	7

Sheet D	1	2	3	4	5	6	7	8	9	10	Final
Grant Brown	0	0	0	1	0	1	X	X	X	X	2
Rob Fowler	4	1	1	0	2	0	X	X	X	X	8

Sheet E	1	2	3	4	5	6	7	8	9	10	Final
Sean Grassie	3	2	3	0	3	X	X	X	X	X	11
Blair Goethals	0	0	0	2	0	X	X	X	X	X	2

=== Draw 3 ===
Wednesday, February 6, 4:00 pm

Sheet A	1	2	3	4	5	6	7	8	9	10	Final
Greg Todoruk	0	0	1	0	0	1	0	0	X	X	2
Dave Elias	0	0	0	2	1	0	3	1	X	X	7

Sheet B	1	2	3	4	5	6	7	8	9	10	Final
Brendan Taylor	3	0	1	0	1	0	2	0	0	1	8
Graham Freeman	0	1	0	1	0	1	0	1	1	0	5

Sheet C	1	2	3	4	5	6	7	8	9	10	Final
Mark Lukowich	1	0	0	1	2	0	0	2	0	0	6
Trevor Loreth	0	3	1	0	0	4	0	0	0	1	9

Sheet D	1	2	3	4	5	6	7	8	9	10	Final
Jeff Stoughton	2	0	2	1	1	0	3	X	X	X	9
Rene Kolly	0	1	0	0	0	1	0	X	X	X	2

Sheet E	1	2	3	4	5	6	7	8	9	10	Final
Shawn Magnusson	1	0	2	0	0	1	0	1	0	X	5
Terry McNamee	0	1	0	2	1	0	3	0	1	X	8

=== Draw 4 ===
Wednesday, February 6, 8:15 pm

Team	1	2	3	4	5	6	7	8	9	10	Final
Scott Madams	0	0	2	0	1	0	1	4	X	X	8
Geoff Trimble	0	0	0	0	0	0	0	0	X	X	0

Team	1	2	3	4	5	6	7	8	9	10	Final
Travis Graham	1	0	1	1	0	1	1	2	3	X	10
Rob Van Kommer	0	3	0	0	1	0	0	0	0	X	4

Team	1	2	3	4	5	6	7	8	9	10	Final
Wayne Ewasko	2	2	0	1	0	0	1	0	0	2	8
Blair Goethals	0	0	1	0	1	2	0	2	1	0	7

Team	1	2	3	4	5	6	7	8	9	10	Final
Grant Brown	0	0	0	0	0	0	1	X	X	X	1
David Kraichy	1	0	1	1	2	1	0	X	X	X	6

Team	1	2	3	4	5	6	7	8	9	10	Final
Scott Ramsay	0	0	1	1	0	0	1	0	0	0	3
Rae Kujanpaa	0	0	0	0	0	1	0	1	1	1	4

=== Draw 5 ===
Thursday, February 7, 8:30 am

Sheet A	1	2	3	4	5	6	7	8	9	10	Final
Rob Fowler	0	2	1	0	2	0	4	X	X	X	10
Jerry Chudley	2	0	0	1	0	1	0	X	X	X	4

Sheet B	1	2	3	4	5	6	7	8	9	10	11	Final
Steen Sigurdson	3	0	2	0	1	0	1	0	1	0	1	9
William Lyburn	0	1	0	2	0	2	0	2	0	1	0	8

Sheet C	1	2	3	4	5	6	7	8	9	10	Final
Terry McNamee	0	0	3	1	1	2	0	3	X	X	10
Brendan Taylor	0	4	0	0	0	0	1	0	X	X	5

Sheet D	1	2	3	4	5	6	7	8	9	10	Final
Kelly Robertson	0	2	0	0	0	0	2	2	1	X	7
Bruce Jones	0	0	1	1	1	1	0	0	0	X	4

Sheet E	1	2	3	4	5	6	7	8	9	10	Final
Shawn Magnusson	0	1	0	0	1	1	0	0	X	X	3
Graham Freeman	2	0	2	3	0	0	1	1	X	X	9

=== Draw 6 ===
Thursday, February 7, 12:15 pm

Sheet A	1	2	3	4	5	6	7	8	9	10	Final
Jared Kolomaya	3	1	0	0	0	1	0	1	0	X	6
Mike McEwen	0	0	1	2	2	0	2	0	3	X	10

Sheet B	1	2	3	4	5	6	7	8	9	10	Final
Daley Peters	0	2	0	2	0	0	0	3	0	X	7
Dennis Bohn	2	0	1	0	3	1	0	0	4	X	11

Sheet C	1	2	3	4	5	6	7	8	9	10	Final
Bob Sigurdson	0	1	0	0	3	0	1	0	1	0	6
Sean Grassie	1	0	2	0	0	1	0	2	0	1	7

Sheet D	1	2	3	4	5	6	7	8	9	10	Final
Trevor Loreth	0	0	1	0	0	1	0	X	X	X	2
Jeff Stoughton	2	2	0	2	0	0	3	X	X	X	9

Sheet E	1	2	3	4	5	6	7	8	9	10	Final
Dave Elias	1	0	3	0	2	3	0	3	X	X	12
Rae Kujanpaa	0	3	0	2	0	0	1	0	X	X	6

=== Draw 7 ===
Thursday, February 7, 4:00 pm

Sheet A	1	2	3	4	5	6	7	8	9	10	Final
Mark Lukowich	3	0	1	1	0	2	0	1	0	1	9
Rene Kolly	0	2	0	0	2	0	1	0	1	0	6

Sheet B	1	2	3	4	5	6	7	8	9	10	Final
Greg Todoruk	2	0	1	0	0	0	X	X	X	X	3
Scott Ramsay	0	2	0	4	3	1	X	X	X	X	10

Sheet C	1	2	3	4	5	6	7	8	9	10	Final
Wayne Ewasko	0	1	1	0	1	0	0	0	2	0	5
Jerry Chudley	2	0	0	3	0	0	1	0	0	1	7

Sheet D	1	2	3	4	5	6	7	8	9	10	Final
Kelly Robertson	2	0	0	0	1	1	0	3	0	1	8
Brendan Taylor	0	2	0	1	0	0	2	0	2	0	7

Sheet E	1	2	3	4	5	6	7	8	9	10	Final
Graham Freeman	0	0	0	2	0	1	0	X	X	X	3
William Lyburn	0	3	1	0	3	0	3	X	X	X	10

=== Draw 8 ===
Thursday, February 7, 7:45 pm

Sheet A	1	2	3	4	5	6	7	8	9	10	Final
Scott Madams	0	3	0	2	0	1	0	1	0	1	8
Daley Peters	0	0	3	0	2	0	1	0	0	0	6

Sheet B	1	2	3	4	5	6	7	8	9	10	Final
Travis Graham	2	0	1	0	0	1	0	0	1	1	6
Jared Kolomaya	0	1	0	2	1	0	2	1	0	0	7

Sheet C	1	2	3	4	5	6	7	8	9	10	Final
David Kraichy	0	1	1	0	0	0	0	2	2	X	6
Bob Sigurdson	2	0	0	0	0	1	0	0	0	X	3

Sheet D	1	2	3	4	5	6	7	8	9	10	Final
Mark Lukowich	1	1	0	3	0	1	0	0	1	4	11
Rae Kujanpaa	0	0	1	0	2	0	0	1	0	0	4

Sheet E	1	2	3	4	5	6	7	8	9	10	Final
Scott Ramsay	0	3	0	0	2	0	2	0	0	1	8
Trevor Loreth	1	0	2	1	0	1	0	1	1	0	7

=== Draw 9 ===
Friday, February 8, 8:30 am

Sheet A	1	2	3	4	5	6	7	8	9	10	Final
Mike McEwen	2	0	0	1	0	2	0	0	0	1	6
Dennis Bohn	0	1	0	0	1	0	1	0	2	0	5

Sheet B	1	2	3	4	5	6	7	8	9	10	Final
Sean Grassie	0	2	0	3	0	3	0	X	X	X	8
Rob Fowler	1	0	1	0	1	0	1	X	X	X	4

Sheet C	1	2	3	4	5	6	7	8	9	10	Final
Steen Sigurdson	2	0	0	1	0	0	2	1	1	0	7
Terry McNamee	0	3	0	0	3	2	0	0	0	1	9

Sheet D	1	2	3	4	5	6	7	8	9	10	Final
Jeff Stoughton	0	1	0	2	0	0	3	0	3	X	9
Dave Elias	0	0	0	0	2	2	0	1	0	X	5

=== Draw 10 ===
Friday, February 8, 12:15 pm

Sheet B	1	2	3	4	5	6	7	8	9	10	Final
Scott Madams	0	0	1	0	2	0	0	3	X	X	6
Jared Kolomaya	0	0	0	0	0	0	1	0	X	X	1

Sheet C	1	2	3	4	5	6	7	8	9	10	Final
Jerry Chudley	0	0	3	0	0	0	1	0	X	X	4
David Kraichy	1	1	0	1	2	1	0	3	X	X	9

Sheet D	1	2	3	4	5	6	7	8	9	10	Final
Kelly Robertson	0	0	0	2	0	1	0	1	1	1	6
William Lyburn	3	0	0	0	2	0	2	0	0	0	7

Sheet E	1	2	3	4	5	6	7	8	9	10	Final
Mark Lukowich	0	0	0	1	0	1	0	X	X	X	2
Scott Ramsay	0	0	1	0	5	0	2	X	X	X	8

=== Draw 11 ===
Friday, February 8, 4:00 pm

Sheet A	1	2	3	4	5	6	7	8	9	10	Final
Scott Madams	0	2	0	4	0	0	0	1	1	0	8
Dennis Bohn	2	0	1	0	1	2	1	0	0	2	9

Sheet B	1	2	3	4	5	6	7	8	9	10	11	Final
David Kraichy	0	2	0	1	1	0	2	0	0	1	0	7
Rob Fowler	1	0	1	0	0	2	0	1	2	0	1	8

Sheet C	1	2	3	4	5	6	7	8	9	10	Final
William Lyburn	2	0	0	0	1	0	1	0	2	0	6
Steen Sigurdson	0	2	1	1	0	1	0	1	0	1	7

Sheet D	1	2	3	4	5	6	7	8	9	10	Final
Scott Ramsay	0	0	2	0	3	0	2	0	5	X	12
Dave Elias	1	0	0	1	0	1	0	2	0	X	5

== Playoff Brackets ==
8 team double knockout
Four teams qualify into Championship Round

=== A event ===
First Knockout
Q1	Mike McEwen	4
Q6	Rob Fowler	9
Q2	Sean Grassie	7
Q5	Dennis Bohn	5

Qualifier 1
Q6	Rob Fowler	2
Q2	Sean Grassie	8

First Knockout
Q3	Terry McNamee	8
Q8	Scott Ramsay	2
Q4	Jeff Stoughton	9
Q7	Steen Sigurdson	2

Qualifier 2
Q3	Terry McNamee	4
Q4	Jeff Stoughton	8

=== B event ===
Second Knockout			Qualifier 3
			Q3	Terry McNamee	1
Q1	Mike McEwen	7	Q1	Mike McEwen	8
Q5	Dennis Bohn	2

Second Knockout			Qualifier 4
			Q6	Rob Fowler	10
Q8	Scott Ramsay	8	Q8	Scott Ramsay	4
Q7	Steen Sigurdson	6

== Playoff Results ==
=== Draw 12 ===
Friday, February 8, 7:45 pm

Sheet B	1	2	3	4	5	6	7	8	9	10	Final
Mike McEwen	1	0	3	0	0	0	0	X	X	X	4
Rob Fowler	0	1	0	0	3	3	2	X	X	X	9

Sheet C	1	2	3	4	5	6	7	8	9	10	Final
Sean Grassie	2	0	0	0	1	0	1	0	2	1	7
Dennis Bohn	0	0	0	2	0	1	0	2	0	0	5

Sheet D	1	2	3	4	5	6	7	8	9	10	Final
Terry McNamee	0	0	2	0	3	0	3	X	X	X	8
Scott Ramsay	0	0	0	1	0	1	0	X	X	X	2

Sheet E	1	2	3	4	5	6	7	8	9	10	Final
Jeff Stoughton	2	2	1	0	2	2	X	X	X	X	9
Steen Sigurdson	0	0	0	2	0	0	X	X	X	X	2

=== Draw 13 ===
Saturday, February 9, 9:00 am

Sheet B	1	2	3	4	5	6	7	8	9	10	Final
Mike McEwen	0	1	0	2	1	2	0	1	X	X	7
Dennis Bohn	1	0	1	0	0	0	0	0	X	X	2

Sheet C	1	2	3	4	5	6	7	8	9	10	Final
Sean Grassie	0	0	4	0	0	4	X	X	X	X	8
Rob Fowler	0	1	0	1	0	0	X	X	X	X	2

Sheet D	1	2	3	4	5	6	7	8	9	10	Final
Terry McNamee	0	0	2	0	1	0	1	X	X	X	4
Jeff Stoughton	3	0	0	2	0	3	0	X	X	X	8

Sheet E	1	2	3	4	5	6	7	8	9	10	Final
Scott Ramsay	2	1	0	3	0	0	2	0	0	X	8
Steen Sigurdson	0	0	2	0	1	1	0	1	1	X	6

=== Draw 14 ===
Saturday, February 9, 2:00 pm

Sheet C	1	2	3	4	5	6	7	8	9	10	Final
Terry McNamee	0	0	1	0	0	0	X	X	X	X	1
Mike McEwen	2	1	0	2	1	2	X	X	X	X	8

Sheet D	1	2	3	4	5	6	7	8	9	10	Final
Rob Fowler	0	2	0	2	0	1	5	X	X	X	10
Scott Ramsay	1	0	2	0	1	0	0	X	X	X	4

== Championship Round ==
Page playoff system
1	Sean Grassie	6
2	Jeff Stoughton	5
3	Mike McEwen	8
4	Rob Fowler	1

Semifinal
2	Jeff Stoughton	5
3	Mike McEwen	3

Final
1	Sean Grassie	4
2	Jeff Stoughton	7

=== 1 vs. 2 ===
Saturday, February 9, 6:30 pm

Sheet C	1	2	3	4	5	6	7	8	9	10	Final
Sean Grassie	0	0	1	0	2	0	1	0	0	2	6
Jeff Stoughton	0	1	0	1	0	1	0	2	0	0	5

=== 3 vs. 4 ===
Saturday, February 9, 6:30 pm

Team	1	2	3	4	5	6	7	8	9	10	Final
Mike McEwen	2	1	3	0	0	2	X	X	X	X	8
Rob Fowler	0	0	0	1	0	0	X	X	X	X	1

=== Semifinal ===
Sunday, February 10, 9:00 am

Team	1	2	3	4	5	6	7	8	9	10	Final
Jeff Stoughton	0	1	0	2	1	0	0	0	1	X	5
Mike McEwen	0	0	1	0	0	0	1	1	0	X	3

=== Final ===
Sunday, February 10, 1:30 pm

Team	1	2	3	4	5	6	7	8	9	10	Final
Sean Grassie	0	0	2	0	1	0	0	1	0	X	4
Jeff Stoughton	2	1	0	1	0	1	0	0	2	X	7

2013 Safeway Championship

Jeff Stoughton
10th Manitoba Provincial Championship title
