= 2011 Interlake Pharmacy Classic =

- Host city: Stonewall, Manitoba
- Arena: Buckingham Curling Club
- Dates: November 18 – 21
- Men's winner: (Manitoba) William Lyburn
- Curling club: Winnipeg, Manitoba
- Skip: William Lyburn
- Third: James Kirkness
- Second: Alex Forrest
- Lead: Tyler Forrest
- Finalist: (Manitoba) Chris Galbraith
- Women's winner: (Manitoba) Barb Spencer
- Curling club: Winnipeg, Manitoba
- Skip: Barb Spencer
- Third: Karen Klein
- Second: Ainsley Champagne
- Lead: Raunora Westcott
- Finalist: (Manitoba) Joelle Brown

The 2011 Interlake Pharmacy Classic is being held from November 18 to 21 at the Stonewall Curling Club in Stonewall, Manitoba as part of the 2011–12 World Curling Tour. The purses for the men's and women's were CAD$21,000 and CAD$11,250, respectively.

== Men ==
=== Teams ===
Skip	Third	Second	Lead	Locale
David Bohn	Andrew Irving	Dennis Bohn	Larry Solomon	Winnipeg, Manitoba
Jim Coleman	A.J Girardin	Brad Van Walleghem	Shane Halliburton	Winnipeg, Manitoba
Dean Dunstone	Ken Tresoor	Taren Gesell	Greg MeInichuk	Winnipeg, Manitoba
Randy Dutiaume	Peter Nicholls	Dean Moxham	Wayne Sigurdson	Winnipeg, Manitoba
Dave Elias	Kevin Thompson	Hubert Perrin	Chris Suchy	Winnipeg, Manitoba
Kyle Foster	Wes Jonasson	Shawn Magnusson	Darcy Jacobs	Arborg, Manitoba
Chris Galbraith	Travis Bale	Bryan Galbraith	Rodney Legault	Winnipeg, Manitoba
Ron Gauthier				Winnipeg, Manitoba
Jared Kolomaya	Neil Kitching	Kennedy Bird	Daniel Hunt	Stonewall, Manitoba
Brad Haight (fourth)	Trevor Loreth (skip)	Ryan Lowdon	Brett Cawson	Winnipeg, Manitoba
William Lyburn	James Kirkness	Alex Forrest	Tyler Forrest	Winnipeg, Manitoba
Scott Madams	Braden Zawada	Ian Fordyce	Nigel Milnes	Winnipeg, Manitoba
Richard Muntain	Mike McCaughan	Justin Reischek	Keith Doherty	Pinawa, Manitoba
Daley Peters (fourth)	Vic Peters (curer)	Brendan Taylor	Kyle Werenich	Winnipeg, Manitoba
Scott Ramsay	Mark Taylor	Ross McFadyen	Ken Buchanan	Winnipeg, Manitoba
Bob Sigurdson	Darren Oryniak	Alan Purdy	Chad Barkman	Winnipeg, Manitoba
Jeff Stoughton	Jon Mead	Reid Carruthers	Steve Gould	Winnipeg, Manitoba
Murray Woodward	William Kuran	Nathan Bodnarchuk	Terry Dreger	Winnipeg, Manitoba

=== A Event ===
First Knockout
(Manitoba) Bob Sigurdson	3
(Manitoba) Dave Elias	7
(Manitoba) William Lyburn	7
(Manitoba) Ron Gauthier	0
(Manitoba) Scott Madams	2
(Manitoba) Trevor Loreth	7
(Manitoba) Jeff Stoughton	4
(Manitoba) Jared Kolomaya	3

Semifinals
(Manitoba) Dave Elias	2
(Manitoba) William Lyburn	6
(Manitoba) Trevor Loreth	4
(Manitoba) Jeff Stoughton	8

Qualifier 1
(Manitoba) William Lyburn	4
(Manitoba) Jeff Stoughton	6

Second Knockout
(Manitoba) Kyle Foster	6
(Manitoba) Richard Muntain	1
(Manitoba) Chris Galbraith	4
(Manitoba) Jim Coleman	1

Quarterfinals
(Manitoba) Randy Dutiaume	8
(Manitoba) Vic Peters	1
(Manitoba) Dean Dunstone	5
(Manitoba) Murray Woodward	4
(Manitoba) Kyle Foster	2
(Manitoba) Chris Galbraith	5
(Manitoba) David Bohn	5
(Manitoba) Scott Ramsay	3

Semifinals
(Manitoba) Randy Dutiaume	3
(Manitoba) Dean Dunstone	8
(Manitoba) Chris Galbraith	0
(Manitoba) David Bohn	11

Qualifier 2
(Manitoba) Dean Dunstone	10
(Manitoba) David Bohn	3

=== B Event ===
Second Knockout
(Manitoba) Bob Sigurdson	10
(Manitoba) Ron Gauthier	3
(Manitoba) Scott Madams	8
(Manitoba) Jared Kolomaya	5

Quarterfinals
(Manitoba) Bob Sigurdson	8
(Manitoba) Trevor Loreth	4
(Manitoba) Kyle Foster	4
(Manitoba) Scott Madams	7

Semifinals
(Manitoba) David Bohn	4
(Manitoba) Bob Sigurdson	3
(Manitoba) Scott Madams	2
(Manitoba) Randy Dutiaume	7

Qualifier 3
(Manitoba) David Bohn	9
(Manitoba) Randy Dutiaume	2

Second Knockout
(Manitoba) Vic Peters	6
(Manitoba) Murray Woodward	3
(Manitoba) Richard Muntain	8
(Manitoba) Jim Coleman	5

Quarterfinals
(Manitoba) Vic Peters	6
(Manitoba) Dave Elias	7
(Manitoba) Scott Ramsay	1
(Manitoba) Richard Muntain	7

Semifinals
(Manitoba) Dave Elias	3
(Manitoba) Chris Galbraith	6
(Manitoba) William Lyburn	9
(Manitoba) Richard Muntain	3

Qualifier 4
(Manitoba) Chris Galbraith	5
(Manitoba) William Lyburn	4

=== C Event ===
Third Knockout
(Manitoba) Ron Gauthier	4
(Manitoba) Jared Kolomaya	5
(Manitoba) Murray Woodward	9
(Manitoba) Jim Coleman	8

Quarterfinals
(Manitoba) Jared Kolomaya	5
(Manitoba) Dave Elias	10
(Manitoba) Murray Woodward	4
(Manitoba) Bob Sigurdson	1

Semifinals
(Manitoba) Murray Woodward	4
(Manitoba) Dave Elias	8

Qualifier 5
(Manitoba) Dave Elias	4
(Manitoba) William Lyburn	7

Third Knockout
(Manitoba) Scott Ramsay	5
(Manitoba) Vic Peters	3
(Manitoba) Kyle Foster	5
(Manitoba) Trevor Loreth	9

Quarterfinals
(Manitoba) Richard Muntain	3
(Manitoba) Scott Ramsay	5
(Manitoba) Scott Madams	6
(Manitoba) Trevor Loreth	10

Semifinals
(Manitoba) Scott Ramsay	7
(Manitoba) Trevor Loreth	4

Qualifier 6
(Manitoba) Scott Ramsay	7
(Manitoba) Randy Dutiaume	6

=== Playoffs ===
Quarterfinals
(Manitoba) David Bohn	3
(Manitoba) William Lyburn	4
(Manitoba) Chris Galbraith	6
(Manitoba) Scott Ramsay	3

Semifinals
(Manitoba) Jeff Stoughton	4
(Manitoba) William Lyburn	7
(Manitoba) Dean Dunstone	4
(Manitoba) Chris Galbraith	5

Final
(Manitoba) William Lyburn	6
(Manitoba) Chris Galbraith	2

== Women ==
=== Teams ===
Skip	Third	Second	Lead	Locale
Kelsey Boettcher	Sam Murata	Brandi Oliver	Lindsay Baldock	Winnipeg, Manitoba
Joelle Brown	Tracey Lavery	Susan Baleja	Jennifer Cawson	Winnipeg, Manitoba
Betty Buurma	Quinn Roberts	Jen Kienas	Suzie Scott	Carberry, Manitoba
Alexandra Carlson	Monica Walker	Kendall Moulton	Jordan Moulton	St. Paul, Minnesota
Janet Harvey	Cherie-Ann Loder	Kristin Loder	Carey Kirby	Winnipeg, Manitoba
Kim Link	Maureen Bonar	Colleen Kilgallen	Renee Fletcher	East St. Paul, Manitoba
D'arcy Maywood	Laryssa Grenkow	Jillian Sandison	Lindsay Edie	Winnipeg, Manitoba
Deb McCreanor	Ashley Meakin	Stephanie Armstrong-Craplewe	Laurie Macdonell	La Salle, Manitoba
Michelle Montford	Courtney Blanchard	Sara Jones	Sarah Norget	Winnipeg, Manitoba
Barb Spencer	Karen Klein	Ainsley Champagne	Raunora Westcott	Winnipeg, Manitoba
Linda Stewart	Amanda Tycholis	Kristie Moroz	Jennifer Clark-Rouire	Winnipeg, Manitoba
Jill Thurston	Kerri Einarson	Kendra Georges	Sarah Wazney	Winnipeg, Manitoba
Amanda Tymchuk	Ashley Korotash	Jessica Levi	Amanda Ginter	Winnipeg, Manitoba
Terry Ursel	Wanda Rainka	Kendell Kohinski	Brenda Walker	Winnipeg, Manitoba

=== A Event ===
First Knockout		Semifinals		Qualifier 1
(Manitoba) Deb McCreanor	1
(Manitoba) Barb Spencer	8	(Manitoba) Barb Spencer	6
(Manitoba) Michelle Montford	2	(Manitoba) Linda Stewart	3
(Manitoba) Linda Stewart	9			(Manitoba) Barb Spencer	6
(Manitoba) Kelsey Boettcher	4			(Manitoba) Joelle Brown	5
(Manitoba) Joelle Brown	5	(Manitoba) Joelle Brown	4
		(Manitoba) Jill Thurston	3

First Knockout		Semifinals		Qualifier 2
		(Manitoba) Janet Harvey	9
(Manitoba) D'arcy Maywood	8	(Manitoba) D'arcy Maywood	1
(Manitoba) Amanda Tymchuk	4			(Manitoba) Janet Harvey	4
(Manitoba) Terry Ursel	8			(Manitoba) Betty Buurma	5
(Manitoba) Kim Link	6	(Manitoba) Terry Ursel	8
(Manitoba) Betty Buurma	6	(Manitoba) Betty Buurma	9
(Minnesota) Alexandra Carlson	3

=== B Event ===
Second Knockout
(Manitoba) Deb McCreanor	6
(Manitoba) Michelle Montford	7

Quarterfinals
(Manitoba) Terry Ursel	5
(Manitoba) Michelle Montford	9
(Manitoba) D'arcy Maywood	8
(Manitoba) Kelsey Boettcher	6

Semifinals
(Manitoba) Michelle Montford	4
(Manitoba) D'arcy Maywood	8

Qualifier 3
(Manitoba) D'arcy Maywood	2
(Manitoba) Janet Harvey	7

Second Knockout
(Manitoba) Kim Link	2
(Minnesota) Alexandra Carlson	8

Quarterfinals
(Manitoba) Jill Thurston	8
(Manitoba) Amanda Tymchuk	2
(Manitoba) Linda Stewart	6
(Minnesota) Alexandra Carlson	2

Semifinals
(Manitoba) Jill Thurston	8
(Manitoba) Linda Stewart	10

Qualifier 4
(Manitoba) Linda Stewart	4
(Manitoba) Joelle Brown	5

=== Consolation ===
Semifinal		Final
(Manitoba) Deb McCreanor	4
(Manitoba) Kelsey Boettcher	8	(Manitoba) Kelsey Boettcher	3
(Manitoba) Kim Link	9	(Manitoba) Kim Link	4
(Manitoba) Amanda Tymchuk	5

=== Playoffs ===
Semifinal		Final
(Manitoba) Barb Spencer	5
(Manitoba) Janet Harvey	2	(Manitoba) Barb Spencer	4
(Manitoba) Betty Buurma	1	(Manitoba) Joelle Brown	3
(Manitoba) Joelle Brown	9
