= 2019 Viterra Championship =

- Host city: Virden, Manitoba
- Arena: Tundra Oil and Gas Place
- Dates: February 6–10
- Winner: Team Carruthers
- Curling club: West St. Paul CC, West St. Paul
- Skip: Mike McEwen
- Third: Reid Carruthers
- Second: Derek Samagalski
- Lead: Colin Hodgson
- Finalist: William Lyburn

The 2019 Viterra Championship, Manitoba's provincial men's curling championship, was held from February 6 to 10 at the Tundra Oil and Gas Place in Virden. The winning Team Carruthers represented Manitoba at the 2019 Tim Hortons Brier, Canada's national men's curling championship in Brandon, Manitoba.

== Teams ==
Teams are as follows:

Skip	Third	Second	Lead	Alternate	Club
Daniel Birchard	Kelly Fordyce	Brody Moore	Andrew Peck		Pembina
David Bohn	Justin Richter	Tyler Forrest	Bryce McEwen		Assiniboine
Dennis Bohn	Neil Kitching	Kody Janzen	Daniel Hunt		Assiniboine
Braden Calvert	Kyle Kurz	Ian McMillan	Rob Gordon		Assiniboine
Mike McEwen	Reid Carruthers	Derek Samagalski	Colin Hodgson		West St. Paul
Corey Chambers	Julien Leduc	Devon Wiebe	Stuart Shiells		Lorette
Robert Daudet	Craig Ross	Liam Green	Mark Lawson		Granite
Ty Dilello	Hayden Forrester	Brennan Sampson	Brendan Wilson		Fort Rouge
Tyler Drews	Joshua Drews	Daryl Evans	Andrew Evans	Ron Westcott	Fort Rouge
Graham Freeman	Kevin Barkley	Cory Barkley	Dwayne Barkley	Brooks Freeman	Virden
Sean Grassie	Devin McArthur	Lucas Van Den Bosch	Chad Barkman		Deer Lodge
Jason Gunnlaugson	Alex Forrest	Denni Neufeld	Connor Njegovan		Morris
Steve Irwin	Travis Taylor	Travis Brooks	Travis Saban	Cale Dunbar	Brandon
Trevor Loreth	Brad Haight	Ryan Lowdon	Brett Cawson	Stu Gresham	Granite
Tanner Lott	Colton Lott	Kennedy Bird	Wade Ford		Winnipeg Beach
Mark Lukowich	Sheldon Oshanyk	Chris Chimuk	Kevin Wiebe	Rob Atkins	Granite
William Lyburn	Daley Peters	Kyle Doering	Brendan Bilawka		Granite
Kelly Marnoch	Bart Witherspoon	Branden Jorgensen	Chris Cameron	Ross Granger	Carberry
Curtis McCannell	Rob Van Kommer	Bill Thiessen	Anthony Friesen	Brian Stephenson	Pilot Mound
Terry McNamee	Brendan Taylor	Geordie Hargreaves	Travis Gouldie		Brandon
Randy Neufeld	Dean Moxham	Peter Nicholls	Brett Moxham		La Salle
Dean North	Darcy Hayward	Wayne Nussey	Mike Hutton		Carman
Shaun Parsons	Kevin Parsons	Bronston Jonasson	Jim Davidson		Burntwood
Darren Perche	Jason Perche	Shane Perche	Bryce Perche	Clint Stuart	Charleswood
Kelly Robertson	Peter Prokopowich	Ray Baker	Bob Scales	Mark Hadway	Neepawa
Grant Shewfelt	Warren Alexander	Rob Van Deynze	Michael Orchard	Mike Johnson	Baldur
Steen Sigurdson	Andrew Hunt	Dillon Bednarek	Mitch Einarson	Justin Reynolds	Gimli
Riley Smith	Nick Curtis	Jared Hancox	Trevor Grenkow	Colin Grenkow	Fort Rouge
Jeff Stewart	Dean Smith	Austin Mustard	Jefferey Steen	Ronald Kulbacki	Gladstone
Ryan Thomson	Kyle Peters	Mark Georges	Evan Gillis	Trevor Calvert	Morden
Greg Todoruk	Dwight Bottrell	Darcy Todoruk	Rob Lulashnyk	Rob Fisher	Dauphin
Brett Walter	Zachary Wasylik	Terron Stykalo	Lawson Yates	Chris Suchy	Elmwood

== Knockout Brackets ==
32 team double knockout with playoff round
Four teams qualify each from A Event and B Event

=== A Event ===
First Knockout	Qualifier 1
Graham Freeman	6
Kelly Marnoch	4
Graham Freeman	1
Jason Gunnlaugson	8
Jason Gunnlaugson	10
Darren Perche	2
Jason Gunnlaugson	6
Ryan Thomson	3
Curtis McCannell	3
David Bohn	8
David Bohn	5
Ryan Thomson	8
Steve Irwin	3
Ryan Thomson	9

First Knockout	Qualifier 2
Kelly Robertson	3
Riley Smith	8
Riley Smith	5
William Lyburn	9
William Lyburn	8
Dean North	3
William Lyburn	5
Braden Calvert	8
Shaun Parsons	3
Braden Calvert	9
Braden Calvert	9
Trevor Loreth	3
Trevor Loreth	10
Brett Walter	3

First Knockout	Qualifier 3
Mark Lukowich	3
Sean Grassie	10
Sean Grassie	4
Tanner Lott	6
Tanner Lott	9
Greg Todoruk	2
Tanner Lott	7
Dennis Bohn	6
Grant Shewfelt	5
Dennis Bohn	6
Dennis Bohn	7
Daniel Birchard	4
Daniel Birchard	8
Steen Sigurdson	1

First Knockout	Qualifier 4
Randy Neufeld	2
Terry McNamee	7
Terry McNamee	9
Team Carruthers	5
Team Carruthers	15
Robert Daudet	1
Terry McNamee	4
Corey Chambers	6
Jeff Stewart	5
Corey Chambers	10
Corey Chambers	9
Ty Dilello	6
Ty Dilello	10
Tyler Drews	5

=== B Event ===
Second Knockout	Qualifier 5
David Bohn	9
Kelly Marnoch	9	Kelly Marnoch	1	Ryan Thomson	3
Darren Perche	3	David Bohn	7	David Bohn	6
Steve Irwin	4
Graham Freeman	3
Curtis McCannell	2	Steve Irwin	10
Steve Irwin	7

Second Knockout	Qualifier 6
Trevor Loreth	10
Kelly Robertson	9	Dean North	6	William Lyburn	8
Dean North	12	Trevor Loreth	9	Trevor Loreth	3
Riley Smith	3
Riley Smith	10
Shaun Parsons	3	Brett Walter	3
Brett Walter	10

Second Knockout	Qualifier 7
Daniel Birchard	9
Mark Lukowich	5	Greg Todoruk	4	Dennis Bohn	5
Greg Todoruk	8	Daniel Birchard	5	Steen Sigurdson	7
Steen Sigurdson	6
Sean Grassie	4
Grant Shewfelt	4	Steen Sigurdson	7
Steen Sigurdson	10

Second Knockout	Qualifier 8
Ty Dilello	9
Randy Neufeld	10	Randy Neufeld	3	Terry McNamee	3
Robert Daudet	2	Ty Dilello	0	Team Carruthers	7
Team Carruthers	10
Team Carruthers	10
Jeff Stewart	8	Jeff Stewart	1
Tyler Drews	3

== Playoff Round ==
8 team double knockout
Four teams qualify into Championship Round

=== A event ===
First Knockout
Q1	Jason Gunnlaugson	8
Q6	William Lyburn	2
Q2	Braden Calvert	9
Q5	David Bohn	0

Qualifier 1
Q1	Jason Gunnlaugson	8
Q2	Braden Calvert	4

First Knockout
Q3	Tanner Lott	7
Q8	Team Carruthers	9
Q4	Corey Chambers	6
Q7	Steen Sigurdson	2

Qualifier 2
Q8	Team Carruthers	7
Q4	Corey Chambers	0

=== B event ===
Second Knockout			Qualifier 3
			Q4	Corey Chambers	2
Q6	William Lyburn	8	Q6	William Lyburn	6
Q5	David Bohn	6

Second Knockout			Qualifier 4
			Q2	Braden Calvert	3
Q3	Tanner Lott	10	Q3	Tanner Lott	12
Q7	Steen Sigurdson	2

== Championship round ==
Page playoff system
1	Jason Gunnlaugson	2
2	Team Carruthers	9
3	William Lyburn	8
4	Tanner Lott	7

Semifinal
1	Jason Gunnlaugson	2
3	William Lyburn	6

Final
2	Team Carruthers	5
3	William Lyburn	3

=== 1 vs. 2 ===
Saturday, February 9, 6:00 pm

Sheet C	1	2	3	4	5	6	7	8	9	10	Final
Jason Gunnlaugson	0	1	0	0	1	0	X	X	X	X	2
Team Carruthers 🔨	2	0	2	2	0	3	X	X	X	X	9

=== 3 vs. 4 ===
Saturday, February 9, 6:00 pm

Sheet D	1	2	3	4	5	6	7	8	9	10	Final
William Lyburn	2	0	0	1	0	3	0	0	0	2	8
Tanner Lott 🔨	0	1	0	0	1	0	2	2	1	0	7

=== Semifinal ===
Sunday, February 10, 8:30 am

Sheet C	1	2	3	4	5	6	7	8	9	10	Final
Jason Gunnlaugson 🔨	0	0	0	1	0	0	0	0	1	0	2
William Lyburn	0	0	0	0	2	0	0	1	0	3	6

=== Final ===
Sunday, February 10, 3:00 pm

Sheet C	1	2	3	4	5	6	7	8	9	10	Final
Team Carruthers 🔨	0	0	0	2	1	0	0	2	0	X	5
William Lyburn	0	0	0	0	0	0	3	0	0	X	3

2019 Viterra Championship

Team Carruthers
6th Manitoba Provincial Championship title
