= Interlake Pharmacy Classic =

Former World Curling Tour event

The Interlake Pharmacy Classic was an annual bonspiel, or curling tournament, that took place at the Stonewall Curling Club in Stonewall, Manitoba. The tournament was held in a modified double-knockout format. The tournament, started in 2004 as part of the World Curling Tour, was briefly excluded in 2009 but was re-added in 2010. Curlers from Manitoba have dominated the event.

== Past champions ==
=== Men ===
Only skip's name is displayed.

Year	Winning team	Runner-up team	Purse (CAD)
2004	(Manitoba) William Kuran		
2005	(Manitoba) Howard Restall		
2006	(Manitoba) Kerry Burtnyk		
2007	(Manitoba) Kerry Burtnyk		
2008	(Manitoba) Jeff Stoughton	(Manitoba) Brad Haight	$27,000
2009	(Manitoba) David Bohn	(Manitoba) Dave Elias	
2010	(Manitoba) Reid Carruthers	(Manitoba) David Bohn	$21,000
2011	(Manitoba) William Lyburn	(Manitoba) Chris Galbraith	$21,000

=== Women ===
Only skip's name is displayed.

Year	Winning team	Runner-up team	Purse (CAD)
2004	(Manitoba) Ainsley Champagne		
2005	(Manitoba) Janet Harvey		
2006	(Manitoba) Barb Spencer		
2007	(Manitoba) Joelle Brown		
2008	(Manitoba) Kim Link		$11,250
2009	(Manitoba) Chelsea Carey	(Manitoba) Janet Harvey	
2010	(Manitoba) Shauna Streich	(Manitoba) Jill Thurston	$11,250
2011	(Manitoba) Barb Spencer	(Manitoba) Joelle Brown	$11,250
