= DeKalb Superspiel =

DEKALB Superspiel
- Established: 2009
- Host city: Morris, Manitoba
- Arena: Morris Curling Club
- Men's purse: $30,000
- Women's purse: $17,200

Current champions (2025)
- Men: (Manitoba) Braden Calvert
- Women: (Japan) Miyu Ueno

Location in Canada

The DeKalb Superspiel is a curling bonspiel that takes place at the Morris Curling Club in Morris, Manitoba. It was an event on the World Curling Tour until 2019 and the Manitoba Curling Tour, and also takes part in the Canadian Team Ranking System (CTRS). There is a men's and women's event. The event began in 2009 and is annually held usually the third weekend in November but is subject to changes if the WCT or MCA has a conflicting bonspiel.

== Past champions ==
Only skip's name is displayed.

=== Men ===
Year	Winning team	Runner up team	Purse (CAD)
2009	(Manitoba) Vic Peters	(Manitoba) Randy Dutiaume	$18,200
2010	(Manitoba) Mike McEwen	(Manitoba) Dave Boehmer	$19,000
2011 (Mar.)	(Alberta) Kevin Koe	(Manitoba) Mike McEwen	$35,000
2011 (Nov.)	(Saskatchewan) Braeden Moskowy	(Manitoba) William Lyburn	$30,000
2012	(Manitoba) William Lyburn	(Switzerland) Alexander Attinger	$30,000
2013	(Manitoba) Steen Sigurdson	(Saskatchewan) Jeff Hartung	$30,000
2014	(Manitoba) Matt Dunstone	(Manitoba) Scott Ramsay	$30,000
2015	(Manitoba) Reid Carruthers	(Alberta) Charley Thomas	$45,000
2016	(Manitoba) Mike McEwen	(Manitoba) William Lyburn	$45,000
2017	(Ontario) Dylan Johnston	(Switzerland) Yannick Schwaller	$34,500
2018	(Saskatchewan) Matt Dunstone	(Saskatchewan) Kirk Muyres	$45,000
2019	(Manitoba) Tanner Horgan	(Manitoba) Mike McEwen	$33,800
2020	Cancelled		
2021	(Manitoba) Jason Gunnlaugson	(Alberta) Karsten Sturmay	$36,000
2022	(Manitoba) Matt Dunstone	(Manitoba) Reid Carruthers	$36,000
2023	(Ontario) Tanner Horgan	(Manitoba) Braden Calvert	$30,000
2024	(Manitoba) Braden Calvert	(Manitoba) Brett Walter	$30,000
2025	(Manitoba) Braden Calvert	(United States) Chase Sinnett	$30,000

=== Women ===
Year	Winning team	Runner up team	Purse (CAD)
2009	(Alberta) Crystal Webster	(Quebec) Ève Bélisle	$18,200
2010	(Ontario) Sherry Middaugh	(China) Wang Bingyu	$14,600
2011 (Mar.)	(Manitoba) Chelsea Carey	(Manitoba) Michelle Montford	$19,000
2011 (Nov.)	(Manitoba) Barb Spencer	(Manitoba) Lisa DeRiviere	$24,000
2012	(Manitoba) Darcy Robertson	(Manitoba) Barb Spencer	$24,000
2013	(Manitoba) Barb Spencer	(Switzerland) Michèle Jäggi	$24,000
2014	(Ontario) Tracy Horgan	(Manitoba) Jennifer Jones	$30,000
2015	(Manitoba) Jennifer Jones	(United States) Erika Brown	$40,000
2016	(Manitoba) Jennifer Jones	(Manitoba) Michelle Englot	$37,000
2017	(Saskatchewan) Penny Barker	(Manitoba) Briane Meilleur	$23,000
2018	(Manitoba) Allison Flaxey	(Manitoba) Jennifer Clark-Rouire	$45,000
2019	(Alberta) Laura Walker	(Manitoba) Mackenzie Zacharias	$26,700
2020	Cancelled		
2021	(Saskatchewan) Amber Holland	(British Columbia) Kayla MacMillan	$24,000
2022	(Manitoba) Abby Ackland	(Saskatchewan) Nancy Martin	$24,000
2023	(Switzerland) Xenia Schwaller	(Alberta) Serena Gray-Withers	$30,000
2024	(South Korea) Kang Bo-bae	(South Korea) Kim Eun-jung	$30,000
2025	(Japan) Miyu Ueno	(Alberta) Serena Gray-Withers	$17,200
