= Matt Wozniak =

Canadian curler (born 1983)

- Curler
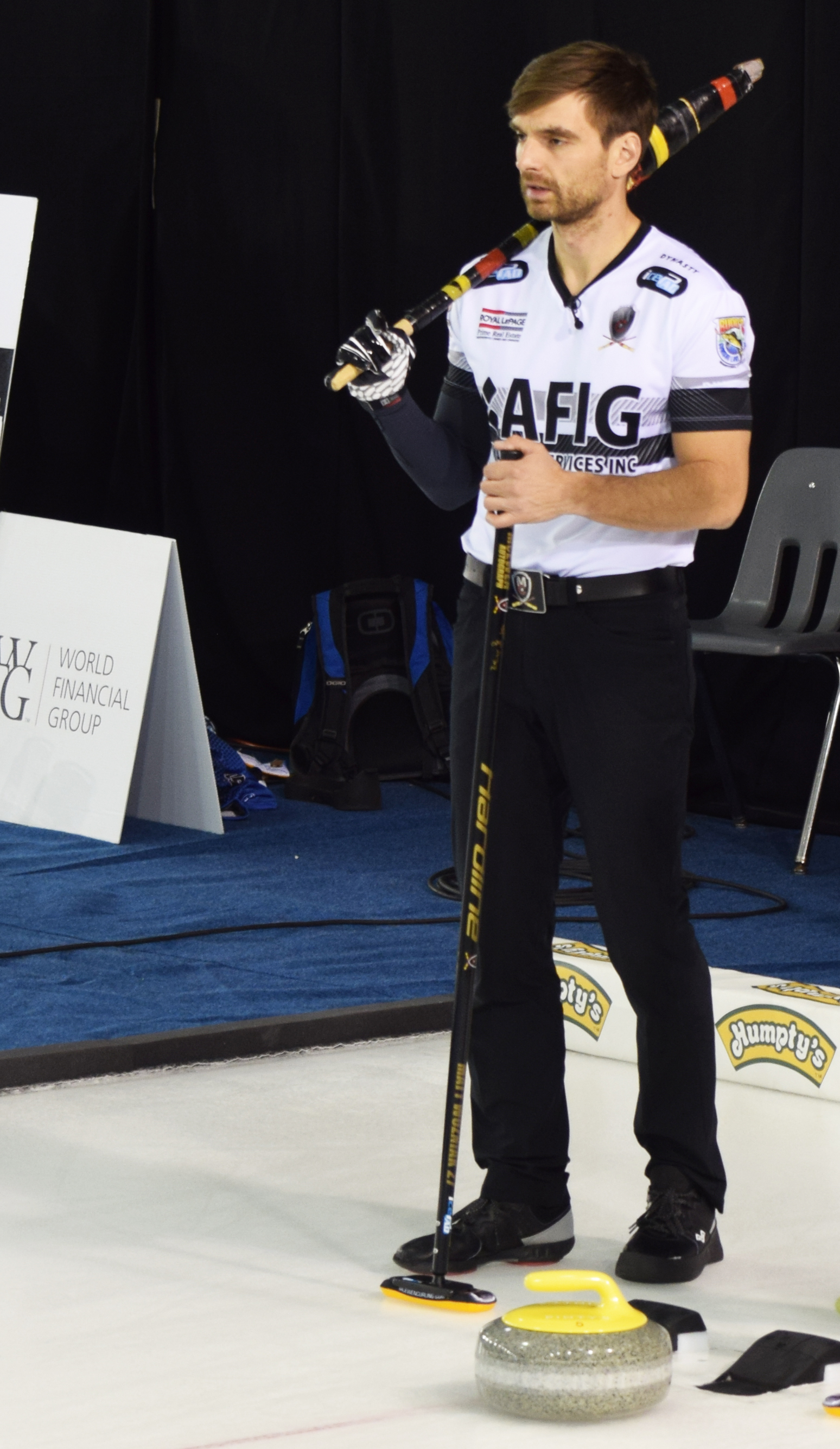
- Born: January 6, 1983 (age 43); Winnipeg, Manitoba, Canada

Team
- Curling club: Fort Rouge CC, Winnipeg, MB

Curling career
- Member Association: Manitoba
- Brier: 6 (2016, 2017, 2018, 2019, 2021, 2022)
- Top CTRS ranking: 1st (2014–15)
- Grand Slam victories: 7 (2010 World Cup, 2011 Canadian Open (Jan.), 2011 Canadian Open (Dec.), 2014 National (Nov.), 2015 Elite 10, 2015 Masters, 2018 Elite 10 (Mar.))
Medal record
Men's curling
Representing Manitoba
Canadian Olympic Curling Trials
Silver medal – second place	2017 Ottawa
Tim Hortons Brier
Bronze medal – third place	2017 St. John's

Matt Wozniak (born January 6, 1983) is a Canadian curler from Winnipeg, Manitoba. Wozniak is the former second for the Mike McEwen team which curled out of the Assiniboine Memorial Curling Club in Winnipeg.

== Career ==
=== 2005–2010 ===
In 2005, Wozniak joined the new Mike McEwen rink that included Justin Richter and Andrew Melnuk. For the 2006–07 season, Richter and Melnuk left the team and were replaced with Geordie Hargreaves and Adam Guenther. The team disbanded after just one season together.

Wozniak and McEwen joined with brothers Denni and B. J. Neufeld in 2007. In their first season together, they were a semi-finalist at the 2008 Safeway Championship, Manitoba's provincial championship. Their first Grand Slam event as a team was at the end season, at the 2008 Players' Championships. The team won two games, before being eliminated.

At the conclusion of the 2008–09 season the McEwen team was ranked 7th on the CCA rankings. They had made it to three Grand Slam playoffs, and finished 4th at the 2009 Safeway Championship.

During the 'Road to the Roar' 2009 Olympic Qualifier, the McEwen team just lost out to fellow Manitobans the Jason Gunnlaugson team in the semi-finals. Team McEwen thus missed out on the 2009 Canadian Olympic Curling Trials final despite being the favourite in that particular matchup vs Gunnlaugson.

McEwen's rink made it to his first provincial final in 2010, when he lost to Jeff Stoughton in the 2010 Manitoba provincial final. The game was being played in Steinbach, Manitoba and as the Neufeld brothers and their father have roots in Steinbach, were treated very much as the home team and crowd favourites.

=== 2010-2015: Grand Slam success and perennial provincial runner-up ===
Team McEwen started the 2010–11 season off well by defeating provincial rival Jeff Stoughton to win the World Cup of Curling and his first ever Grand Slam title in November, 2010. In part of the teams runner-up result in the provincial finals of 2010 and in part because of his 4 victories and leading the overall money winnings in the World Curling Tour season as of November 2010, the McEwen team was named as a nominee for the provincial team of the year by the Manitoba Sportswriters and Sportscasters Association.

The team continued their strong season that year by defeating provincial rival Stoughton in the semi-final of the 2011 Canadian Open. They would then go on to beat the Glenn Howard team in the extra end of the final, thus winning their second career Grand Slam and their second of that season.

Wozniak's rink once again made it to the Manitoba provincial this time, being the top seed (also ranked 1st in Canada). However, once again lost to Stoughton in the final of the 2011 Safeway Championship, losing by one point in the final end. The McEwen team then lost their third straight provincial final game at the 2012 Safeway Championship, this time losing to Rob Fowler, thus tying a provincial record for consecutive final losses previous set by Kerry Burtnyk from 97 to 99. This dubious record was avoided in 2013, when the McEwen rink failed to reach the final, but again losing to the rival Stoughton rink in the 2013 Safeway Championship semi-final. Once again, at the 2014 Safeway Championship, the team lost the final to Stoughton.

Despite being ranked first in the world on both the World Curling Tour Order of Merit rankings and on the WCT money list, Wozniak lost his fifth provincial final in six years in 2015, losing to Reid Carruthers.

=== Three Briers and team breakup ===
Wozniak's rink won their first provincial title in 2016, sending them to their first Brier. The Matt Dunstone rink had committed themselves to the 2016 World Junior Curling Championships, which occurred at the same time as the 2016 Tim Hortons Brier, so when the Dunstone rink beat Reid Carruthers in the semi-final, McEwen's team would go to the Brier, even if they had lost to Dunstone.

In 2017, Wozniak defended his Manitoba Championship by beating Reid Carruthers in the final. He would then better his 2016 Brier showing, going 9–2 in the round robin to enter the playoffs in first place and with hammer and choice of rocks (Brad Gushue was also 9–2 but lost first place due to losing his round robin meeting with Manitoba). He then lost 7–5 to Brad Gushue in the 1 vs. 2 game. In the semi-finals against reigning Brier and World Champion Kevin Koe, they were in control for most of the game, being up 5–3 with hammer in the eighth end, but Koe made a comeback with a steal in the eighth end, two points in the tenth end, and another steal in the extra end, dropping Manitoba to the bronze medal game. They recovered to win their first Brier medal, defeating Brad Jacobs in their rematch of the 2016 bronze medal game, 7–6 in an extra end.

While competing at the 2018 Viterra Championship, skip McEwen came down with chickenpox and was unable to play after the first game. B. J. Neufeld skipped the team, until a surprise appearance by McEwen in the final, where they lost to Carruthers. Despite the setback, they still had a chance to qualify for the 2018 Tim Hortons Brier through the wildcard game, which they won over Jason Gunnlaugson. Team McEwen had a difficult Brier and alongside Carruthers was unable to qualify for the playoffs. Following the Brier, the McEwen team announced they would be breaking up at the end of the 2017–18 season. Just days after the announcement, the McEwen team won the 2018 Elite 10 Grand Slam of Curling event, winning the top $28,000 prize money, and was the first team to go through the entire event undefeated. The Grand Slam victory was the team's seventh overall.

Wozniak took a few years off from men's play after Team McEwen broke up. However, he played mixed doubles with his current girlfriend Marlene Albrecht and spared for McEwen's new team. After Alex Forrest stepped away from competitive curling after the 2019–20 season, Wozniak joined the Jason Gunnlaugson rink. Due to the COVID-19 pandemic in Manitoba, the 2021 provincial championship was cancelled. As Team Gunnlaugson were the reigning provincial champions, they were chosen to represent Manitoba at the 2021 Tim Hortons Brier. At the Brier, they finished with a 6–6 record.

== Personal life ==
Wozniak is employed as a mortgage broker for Vertuity Mortgage. He is currently in a relationship with Swiss curler Marlene Albrecht and has two children.

== Grand Slam record ==
Key
C	Champion
F	Lost in Final
SF	Lost in Semifinal
QF	Lost in Quarterfinals
R16	Lost in the round of 16
Q	Did not advance to playoffs
T2	Played in Tier 2 event
DNP	Did not participate in event
N/A	Not a Grand Slam event that season

Event	2005–06	2006–07	2007–08	2008–09	2009–10	2010–11	2011–12	2012–13	2013–14	2014–15	2015–16	2016-17	2017–18	2018–19	2019–20	2020–21	2021–22
Elite 10	N/A	N/A	N/A	N/A	N/A	N/A	N/A	N/A	N/A	C	QF	DNP	C	DNP	N/A	N/A	N/A
Masters	Q	DNP	DNP	Q	DNP	C	QF	QF	Q	F	C	QF	SF	Q	DNP	N/A	Q
Tour Challenge	N/A	N/A	N/A	N/A	N/A	N/A	N/A	N/A	N/A	N/A	SF	QF	DNP	DNP	DNP	N/A	N/A
The National	DNP	DNP	DNP	QF	QF	QF	Q	F	QF	C	Q	Q	SF	QF	DNP	N/A	Q
Canadian Open	DNP	DNP	DNP	SF	QF	C	C	SF	Q	QF	Q	QF	QF	DNP	DNP	N/A	N/A
Players'	DNP	DNP	Q	SF	Q	QF	SF	F	SF	F	SF	F	SF	DNP	N/A	Q	QF
Champions Cup	N/A	N/A	N/A	N/A	N/A	N/A	N/A	N/A	N/A	N/A	SF	QF	QF	DNP	N/A	Q	QF
