= Charleswood Curling Club =

Curling club in Winnipeg, Canada

Coordinates: 49.8590°N 97.2686°W

Charleswood Curling Club is located in the southwestern area of Winnipeg, in the community of Charleswood. The club was founded in 1946 as a three sheet rink, although expansion to five sheets was completed in 1956. It was the home club of the Jeff Stoughton team.

== Provincial champions ==
Year	Name	Brier Championships	World Championships
2011	Jeff Stoughton	(gold) Champions	(gold) Gold
2010	Jeff Stoughton		
2009	Jeff Stoughton	(silver) Runner-Up	
2007	Jeff Stoughton	(bronze) Third	
2006	Jeff Stoughton		
2000	Jeff Stoughton		
1999	Jeff Stoughton	(gold) Champions	(silver) Silver
1996	Jeff Stoughton	(gold) Champions	(gold) Gold
