= David Hamblin =

Canadian curler

- Curler
- Born: Morris, Manitoba

Team
- Curling club: Pembina Curling Club

Curling career
- Brier: 0
Medal record
Men's Curling
Representing Canada
World Junior Curling Championships
Gold medal – first place	2002 Kelowna

David Hamblin (born c. 1981) is a curler from Morris, Manitoba. Hamblin was the 2002 Manitoba, Canadian, and World Junior Curling Champion. The 2002 team was then inducted into the Manitoba Curling Association Hall of Fame in 2006, and the Manitoba Sports Hall of Fame in 2008.
