= Randy Neufeld =

Canadian curler

Medal record

Curling

World Senior Curling Championships
Silver medal – second place	2016 Karlstad	

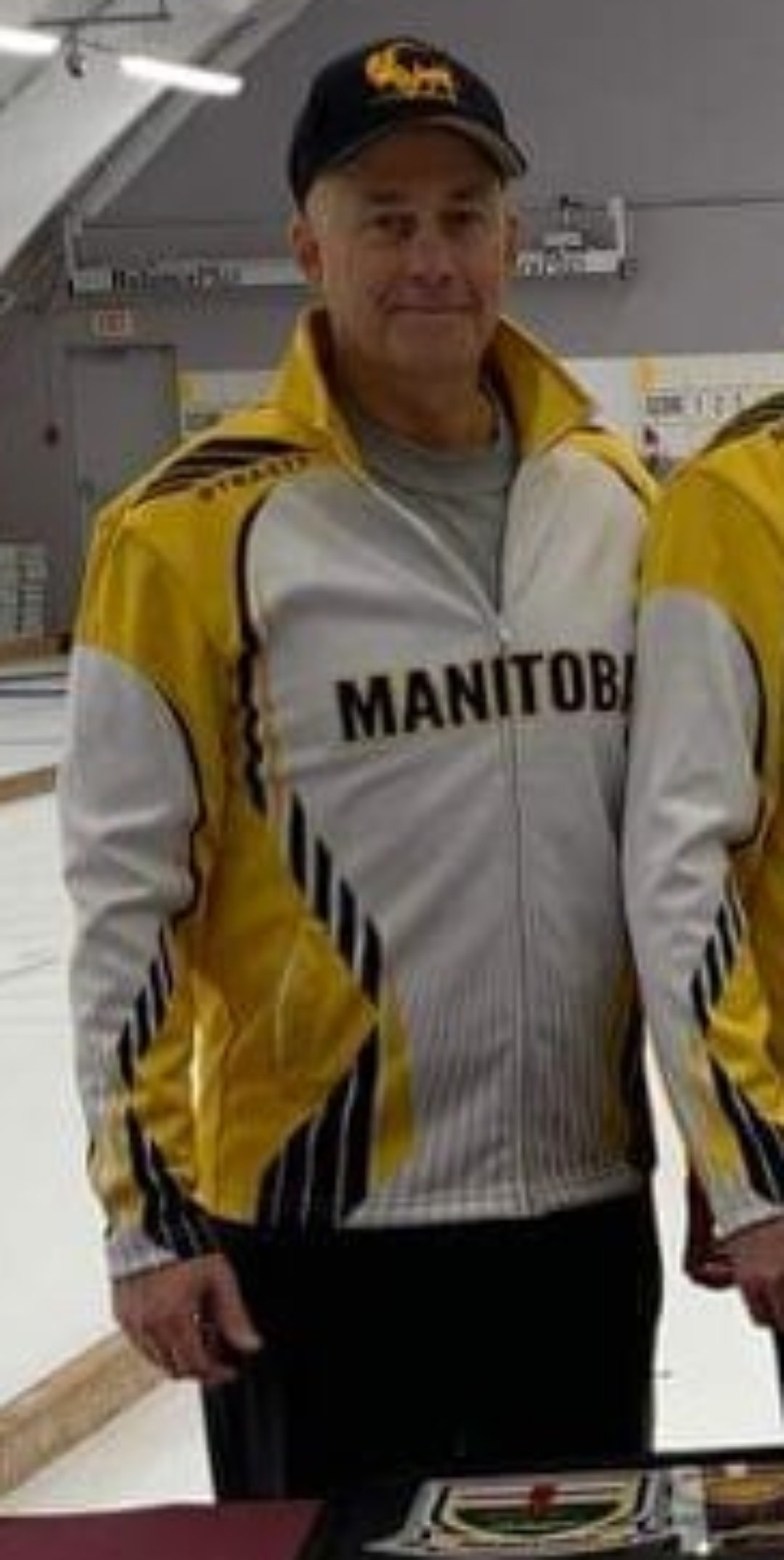
Randy Neufeld posing for picture during Provincial Championship trophy presentation.

Randy Neufeld (born May 26, 1962 in Boissevain, Manitoba) is a Canadian curler from La Salle, Manitoba.

In 2015, Neufeld and his rink of Dean Moxham, Peter Nicholls and Dale Michie won his first provincial title of any kind, when his team won the Manitoba senior men's championship. The team went on to win the 2015 Canadian Senior Curling Championships, after defeating Quebec's Ted Butler in the final. This qualified the team to represent Canada at the 2016 World Senior Curling Championships. There, Neufeld led Canada to an 8-0 round robin record, and went all the way to the final before losing to Sweden's Mats Wranå.

In 2016, Neufeld and his team won another provincial championships and would represent Manitoba at the 2016 Canadian Senior Curling Championships. The team almost defended their title, making it to the final again, but they would lose to Ontario's Bryan Cochrane.

He is the former coach of the Jason Gunnlaugson curling team.

In 2025, Neufeld won the Canadian Masters Curling Championships.

== Personal life ==
He is married and has two children. He works as the Director of Operations at the Canadian Mennonite University.
