= Allan Lyburn =

Scottish-Canadian curler

- Curler ♂
- Born: January 6, 1972 (age 54); Stranraer, Scotland

Team
- Curling club: Brandon CC, Brandon, MB

Curling career
- Brier: 1 (2012)
- Grand Slam victories: 0
Medal record
Men's curling
Representing Manitoba
Tim Hortons Brier
Bronze medal – third place	2012 Saskatoon

Allan Lyburn (born January 6, 1972) is a Scottish-Canadian curler from Brandon, Manitoba. He does not curl competitively anymore.

== Career ==
Prior to competing in Canada, Lyburn previously won the Scottish junior title with his brother William Lyburn in 1992. Lyburn skipped the Scottish rink at the 1992 World Junior Curling Championships, where they finished 6th. He and his family would move to Canada a short time later. His next major victory came when Lyburn won the 2012 Safeway Championship as a third on the Rob Fowler team to represent Manitoba at the Tim Hortons Brier. Lyburn was named the all-star third for the Brier following their bronze medal victory.
