= Randy Dutiaume =

Canadian curler from Winnipeg, Manitoba

- Curler

Team
- Curling club: Stony Mountain CC, Stony Mountain, Manitoba

Curling career
- Brier: 3 (2005, 2007, 2009)
- Top CTRS ranking: 16th (2004-05)

Randy Dutiaume is a Canadian curler from Winnipeg, Manitoba.

Dutiaume was relatively unknown to curling until 2005, having only participated in the 2003 Manitoba men's championship finishing 0-2. However, in 2005 with a new team of Dave Elias, Greg Melnichuk and Shane Kilgallen Dutiaume won the Manitoba Curling Association Bonspiel with a record of 17-1, his only loss coming to junior curler Adam Norget, to qualify for the Manitoba championship. Dutiaume won the Manitoba championship having to get by strong teams like Kerry Burtnyk and Jeff Stoughton, and then Ryan Fry in the final. After winning the Manitoba championship, Dutiaume would go on to the 2005 Tim Hortons Brier where he finished with a strong performance, finishing 2nd in the round-robin behind defending champion Randy Ferbey and his Alberta rink. In the playoffs, Dutiaume and his Manitoba team lost the 1-2 game to Ferbey, and then lost in the semi-final to Nova Scotia's Shawn Adams.
