= Dave Elias =

Canadian curler

- Curler
- Born: July 19, 1969; Transcona, Manitoba, Canada
- Died: June 5, 2013 (aged 43); Winnipeg, Manitoba, Canada

Curling career
- Brier: 2 (2002, 2005)
Medal record
Men's Curling
Representing Manitoba
Tim Hortons Brier
Bronze medal – third place	2005 Edmonton

David Jeff Elias (July 19, 1969 – June 5, 2013) was a Canadian curler from Winnipeg, Manitoba.

Elias grew up in Transcona, a suburb, now a neighbourhood of Winnipeg. Elias won two Manitoba men's provincial championships, the first in 2002 playing second for Mark Lukowich and the second in 2005 playing third for Randy Dutiaume. At the 2002 Nokia Brier, the Lukowich rink went 6–5, missing the playoffs. At the 2005 Tim Hortons Brier, Elias had more success. The Dutiaume rink made the playoffs following an 8-3 round robin record. They would end up losing in the semi-final to Nova Scotia's Shawn Adams.

He was married to Sue Elias and had two children. His mother, Irene won the provincial senior championships in 1999. Elias died of liver cancer in 2013.
