= Daley Peters =

Canadian curler

- Curler
- Born: September 18, 1984 (age 42); Winnipeg, Manitoba, Canada

Team
- Curling club: Brandon CC, Brandon, MB
- Skip: Steve Irwin
- Third: Daley Peters
- Second: Travis Taylor
- Lead: Travis Brooks
- Alternate: Kody Janzen

Curling career
- Top CTRS ranking: 20th (2006–07)

Daley Peters (born September 18, 1984) is a Canadian curler from Winnipeg, Manitoba. He currently plays third on Team Corey Chambers.

== Career ==
Peters was a back to back Manitoba Junior curling champion in 2004 and 2005, the first Junior Men's skip to repeat in Manitoba in nearly a decade. Beginning in 2009, he curled with his father and former Labatt Brier champion, Vic Peters. He was also a former member and skip of the Jason Gunnlaugson team, before that squad went on to curl in the 2009 Canadian Olympic Curling Trials.

== Personal life ==
His sister Liz won the 2008 Canadian Junior Curling Championships as a member of the Kaitlyn Lawes team and later a silver medal at the 2021 Canadian Olympic Curling Trials playing second for Tracy Fleury.
