= David Bohn =

Canadian curler

- Curler
- Born: August 29, 1975 (age 51)

Team
- Curling club: Assiniboine Memorial CC, Winnipeg, MB

David Bohn (born August 29, 1975) is a Canadian curler from Winnipeg, Manitoba.

While never having won a provincial championship in his career, Bohn has been an active skip (or fourth) on the World Curling Tour since 1999. His first event win came at the 1999 Kinsmen Curling Classic, throwing last stones for identical twin brother Dennis. Bohn won another WCT event win at the 2001 Sun Life Grand Prix of Curling. He has just played in one Grand Slam event, the 2003 Players' Championship. After winning his first game there, he would lose the next three matches, eliminating his team in the process.

Bohn lost in the final of the 2008 Safeway Championship against Kerry Burtnyk, the closest he has come to winning a provincial men's title.

In 2015, for the first time in his career, Dennis left his brother's team. After his brother left the team, Bohn would win two more WCT events, winning the Mother Club Fall Curling Classic both in 2015 And 2016, and the 2017 Man Curl Tour Classic And Also The 2017 Atkins Curling Supplies Classic.
