= William Lyburn =

Scottish-Canadian curler

- Curler
- Born: May 8, 1975 (age 51); Dumfries, Scotland

Team
- Curling club: Assiniboine Memorial CC, Winnipeg, MB
- Skip: William Lyburn
- Third: Daley Peters
- Second: Kennedy Bird
- Lead: Wade Ford

Curling career
- Brier: 1 (2012)
- Top CTRS ranking: 13th (2015-16)
- Grand Slam victories: 0
Medal record
Men's Curling
Representing Manitoba
Tim Hortons Brier
Bronze medal – third place	2012 Saskatoon

William Lyburn (born May 8, 1975 in Dumfries, Scotland) is a Scottish-Canadian curler from Winnipeg, Manitoba. He is currently the coach and alternate of the Jordon McDonald rink.

== Career ==
Lyburn won the Scottish junior title with his older brother Allan Lyburn in 1992 and going to the 1992 World Junior Championships where they would finish 6th. He and his family would move to Canada a short time later.

He then went on to assist his brother again, this time when he was the 5th for the Rob Fowler team at the 2012 Tim Hortons Brier where his brother was playing third. Just previously, he won the all-star award for skip at the provincial 2012 Safeway Championship despite failing to win at the event.

== Personal life ==
Lyburn is married to Jody Lyburn and has two children. He works as a sales specialist.

=== Grand Slam record ===
Key
C	Champion
F	Lost in Final
SF	Lost in Semifinal
QF	Lost in Quarterfinals
R16	Lost in the round of 16
Q	Did not advance to playoffs
T2	Played in Tier 2 event
DNP	Did not participate in event
N/A	Not a Grand Slam event that season

Event	2001–02	2002–03	2003–04	2004–05	2005–06	2006–07	2007–08	2008–09	2009–10	2010–11	2011–12	2012–13	2013–14	2014–15	2015–16	2016–17	2017–18
Masters	Q	Q	DNP	DNP	DNP	DNP	DNP	DNP	DNP	DNP	DNP	DNP	DNP	DNP	DNP	DNP	DNP
The National	Q	Q	DNP	DNP	DNP	DNP	DNP	DNP	DNP	DNP	DNP	DNP	DNP	DNP	DNP	DNP	Q
Canadian Open	QF	Q	DNP	DNP	DNP	DNP	DNP	DNP	DNP	DNP	DNP	Q	Q	DNP	DNP	DNP	DNP
Players'	Q	Q	DNP	DNP	DNP	DNP	DNP	DNP	DNP	DNP	DNP	DNP	DNP	DNP	DNP	DNP	DNP
