= Mother Club Fall Curling Classic =

- Established: 2014
- Host city: Winnipeg, Manitoba
- Arena: Granite Curling Club
- Men's purse: $7,000
- Women's purse: $11,000

Current champions (2026)
- Men: (Manitoba) Hayden Forrester
- Women: (Manitoba) Nancy Martin

Location in Canada

The Mother Club Fall Curling Classic is an annual bonspiel on the men's and women's curling tour. It is held annually in late September at the Granite Curling Club in Winnipeg.

The purse for the event for the men's event is $7,000, with the purse for the women's event as $11,000.

== Past champions ==
=== Men's ===
Year	Winning team	Runner up team	Purse (CAD)	Winner's share
2014	(Manitoba) Sean Grassie, Corey Chambers, Kody Janzen, Stuart Shiells	(Manitoba) Steve Irwin, Joey Witherspoon, Travis Taylor, Travis Saban	$10,000	$2,500
2015	(Manitoba) David Bohn, Justin Richter, Tyler Forrest, Bryce J. McEwen	(Manitoba) Matt Dunstone, Colton Lott, Kyle Doering, Rob Gordon	$10,000	$2,500
2016	(Manitoba) David Bohn, Justin Richter, Tyler Forrest, Bryce J. McEwen	(South Korea) Kim Chang-min, Seong Se-hyeon, Oh Eun-soo, Kim Chi-goo	$12,000	
2017	(Manitoba) Jason Gunnlaugson, Alex Forrest, Ian McMillan, Connor Njegovan	(Manitoba) Pat Simmons, Colton Lott, Kyle Doering, Rob Gordon	$10,000	$2,500
2018	(Manitoba) Tanner Lott, Colton Lott, Kennedy Bird, Wade Ford	(United States) Korey Dropkin (Fourth), Thomas Howell, Mark Fenner (Skip), Alex Fenson	$8,000	$1,800
2019	(Manitoba) Jason Gunnlaugson, Alex Forrest, Denni Neufeld, Connor Njegovan	(Manitoba) Tanner Horgan, Colton Lott, Kyle Doering, Tanner Lott	$10,000	$2,500
2020	Cancelled			
2021	(Manitoba) Riley Smith, Nick Curtis, Jared Hancox, Justin Twiss, Josh Claeys	(Manitoba) Braden Calvert, Kyle Kurz, Ian McMillan, Rob Gordon	$10,000	$2,500
2022	(Manitoba) Ryan Wiebe, Ty Dilello, Sean Flatt, Adam Flatt	(Manitoba) Jordon McDonald, Reece Hamm, Elias Huminicki, Cameron Olafson	$7,600	$1,600
2023	(Japan) Takumi Maeda, Asei Nakahara, Hiroki Maeda, Uryu Kamikawa	(Manitoba) Jordon McDonald, Dallas Burgess, Elias Huminicki, Cameron Olafson	$7,600	$1,700
2024	(United States) Ethan Sampson, Coleman Thurston, Jacob Zeman, Marius Kleinas	(Manitoba) Riley Smith, Nick Curtis, Josh Claeys, Justin Twiss	$7,600	$1,700
2025	(Manitoba) Braden Calvert, Corey Chambers, Kyle Kurz, Brendan Bilawka	(Manitoba) Brett Walter, Julien Leduc, Graham McFarlane, Hugh McFarlane	$7,000	$2,000
2026	(Manitoba) Hayden Forrester, Thomas McGillivray, Ethan Brandt, Lawson Yates	(Manitoba) Brett Walter, Julien Leduc, Graham McFarlane, Hugh McFarlane	$7,000	$2,000

=== Women's ===
Year	Winning team	Runner up team	Purse (CAD)	Winner's share
2014	(Manitoba) Kristy McDonald, Kate Cameron, Leslie Wilson-Westcott, Raunora Westcott	(Manitoba) Colleen Kilgallen, Susan Baleja, Janice Blair, Kendra Georges	$10,000	$2,500
2015	(Manitoba) Michelle Montford, Lisa DeRiviere, Sara Van Welleghem, Sarah Neufeld	(Manitoba) Beth Peterson, Robyn Njegovan, Melissa Gordon, Breanne Yozenko	$10,000	$2,500
2016	(Manitoba) Michelle Englot, Kate Cameron, Leslie Wilson-Westcott, Raunora Westcott	(Manitoba) Joelle Brown, Alyssa Calvert, Erika Sigurdson, Lindsay Baldock	$8,000	$2,500
2017	(Manitoba) Michelle Englot, Kate Cameron, Leslie Wilson-Westcott, Raunora Westcott	(Manitoba) Kerri Einarson, Selena Kaatz, Liz Fyfe, Kristin MacCuish	$8,000	$2,000
2018	(Manitoba) Kerri Einarson, Val Sweeting, Shannon Birchard, Briane Meilleur	(Manitoba) Allison Flaxey, Kate Cameron, Taylor McDonald, Raunora Westcott	$9,000	$2,000
2019	(Alberta) Laura Walker, Kate Cameron, Taylor McDonald, Nadine Scotland	(Manitoba) Theresa Cannon, Karen Klein, Vanessa Foster, Raunora Westcott	$6,000	$2,000
2020	Cancelled			
2021	(Manitoba) Mackenzie Zacharias, Karlee Burgess, Emily Zacharias, Lauren Lenentine	(Manitoba) Beth Peterson, Jenna Loder, Katherine Doerksen, Melissa Gordon	$10,000	$1,200
2022	(Manitoba) Kaitlyn Lawes, Selena Njegovan, Jocelyn Peterman, Kristin MacCuish	(United States) Sarah Anderson, Taylor Anderson, Lexi Lanigan, Aileen Geving	$7,600	$1,800
2023	(United States) Delaney Strouse, Anne O'Hara, Sydney Mullaney, Rebecca Rodgers	(Manitoba) Jolene Campbell, Abby Ackland, Rachel Erickson, Sara Oliver	$7,600	$2,500
2024	(Japan) Miyu Ueno, Asuka Kanai, Junko Nishimuro, Yui Ueno	(Ontario) Krista McCarville, Andrea Kelly, Kendra Lilly, Ashley Sippala	$7,600	$2,500
2025	(Saskatchewan) Nancy Martin, Chaelynn Stewart, Kadriana Lott, Christie Gamble	(United States) Kim Rhyme, Stephanie Senneker, Libby Brundage, Anya Normandeau	$11,000	$2,500
2026	(Manitoba) Kadriana Lott (Fourth), Chaelynn Stewart, Nancy Martin (Skip), Makenna Hadway	(Manitoba) Shaela Hayward, India Young, Keira Krahn, Dayna Wahl	$11,000	$2,500
