= MCT Championships =

Annual bonspiel on the World Curling Tour

The Manitoba Curling Tour (MCT) Championships is an annual bonspiel on the men's and women's World Curling Tour. It has been part of the WCT since 2013.

The "furthest advancing eligible team" earns a berth to the provincial championships (the Viterra Championship for men and the Manitoba Scotties Tournament of Hearts for women). This has been the case since 2002-03.

Qualification for events on the Manitoba Curling Tour requires an affiliation fee which is paid into the purse of the MCT Championships. The event has been held since the 1991-92 season for men and the 1996-97 season for women.

== Past men's champions (since 2008) ==
Year	Winning team	Runner up team	Purse (CAD)	Winner's share	Host
2008	Mike McEwen, B. J. Neufeld, Matt Wozniak, Denni Neufeld				
2009	Mike McEwen, B. J. Neufeld, Matt Wozniak, Denni Neufeld				
2011	William Lyburn, James Kirkness, Alex Forrest, Greg Melnichuk	Allan Lyburn, Richard Daneault, Derek Samagalski, Ross Granger	$16,600	$5,000	Morris
2012	Sean Grassie, Corey Chambers, Kody Janzen, Stuart Shiells	Scott Ramsay, Mark Taylor, Ross McFadyen, Kyle Werenich	$9,200	$2,000	Beausejour
2013	William Kuran, Kelly Marnoch (skip), Branden Jorgensen, Chris Cameron	William Lyburn, Alex Forrest, Connor Njegovan, Tyler Forrest	$9,200	$2,000	Beausejour
2014	David Bohn, Bryan Galbraith, Dennis Bohn, Larry Solomon	Daley Peters, Brendan Taylor, Taren Gesell, Greg Melnichuk	$8,000	$1,600	Winnipeg
2015	William Lyburn, Jason Gunnlaugson, Richard Daneault, Braden Zawada	Alex Forrest, Travis Bale, Ian McMillan, Connor Njegovan	$11,500	$2,500	Dauphin
2016	David Bohn, Justin Richter, Tyler Forrest, Bryce J. McEwen	Braden Calvert, Kyle Kurz, Lucas Van Den Bosch, Brendan Wilson	$8,500	$2,000	Dauphin
2017	Jason Gunnlaugson, Alex Forrest, Ian McMillan, Connor Njegovan	Pat Simmons, Colton Lott, Kyle Doering, Rob Gordon	$7,500	$2,000	East St. Paul
2018	Riley Smith, Nick Curtis, Jared Hancox, Trevor Grenkow	Ty Dilello, Hayden Forrester, Brennan Sampson, Brendan Wilson	$4,400		Morris
2019	Ryan Wiebe, Carter Watkins, Sean Flatt, Adam Flatt	Dennis Bohn, Neil Kitching, Kody Janzen, Daniel Hunt	$6,000	$2,400	Winnipeg
2021	Ryan Wiebe, Ty Dilello, Sean Flatt, Adam Flatt	Riley Smith, Nick Curtis, Jared Hancox, Justin Twiss	$5,000	$1,600	Winnipeg
2022	Steve Irwin, Travis Taylor, Travis Brooks, Travis Saban	Ryan Wiebe, Ty Dilello, Sean Flatt, Adam Flatt	$6,000	$1,600	Carberry
2024	Braden Calvert, Corey Chambers, Kyle Kurz, Brendan Bilawka	Brett Walter, J. T. Ryan, Graham McFarlane, Hugh McFarlane	$10,000		Winnipeg
2025	Braden Calvert, Corey Chambers, Kyle Kurz, Brendan Bilawka	Jordan Peters, Adam Flatt, Sean Flatt, Emerson Klimpke	$10,000		Winnipeg

== Past women's champions (since 2011) ==
Year	Winning team	Runner up team	Purse (CAD)	Winner's share
2011	Chelsea Carey, Kristy Jenion, Kristen Foster, Lindsay Titheridge	Kim Link, Maureen Bonar, Colleen Kilgallen, Renee Fletcher	$8,100	$2,350
2012	Barb Spencer, Katie Spencer, Ainsley Champagne, Raunora Westcott	Janet Harvey, Cherie-Ann Loder, Kristin Loder, Carey Kirby	$7,600	$1,800
2013	Joelle Brown, Alyssa Vandepoele, Jolene Rutter, Kelsey Hinds	Michelle Montford, Lisa DeRiviere, Sara Van Walleghem, Sarah Neufeld	$7,600	$1,880
2014	Michelle Montford, Lisa DeRiviere, Sara Van Walleghem, Sarah Neufeld	Barb Spencer, Katie Spencer, Holly Spencer, Sydney Arnal	$8,000	$1,600
2015	Michelle Wiens, Lisa DeRiviere, Sara Van Walleghem, Sarah Neufeld	Joelle Brown, Alyssa Vanderpoele, Erika Sigurdson, Lindsay Baldock	$9,500	$2,500
2016	Darcy Robertson, Karen Klein, Vanessa Foster, Michelle Madden	Shannon Birchard, Nicole Sigvaldason, Sheyna Andries, Mariah Mondor	$4,250	$1,750
2017	Shannon Birchard, Nicole Sigvaldason, Sheyna Andries, Mariah Mondor	Kerri Einarson, Selena Kaatz, Liz Fyfe, Kristin MacCuish	$6,500	$2,000
2018	Beth Peterson, Jenna Loder, Katherine Doerksen, Melissa Gordon	Alyssa Calvert, Tanya Enns, Pam Robins, Roz Taylor	$3,700	
2019	Kristy Watling, Christine MacKay, Taylor Maida, Katrina Thiessen	Beth Peterson, Jenna Loder, Katherine Doerksen, Melissa Gordon	$2,500	$1,200
2021	Mackenzie Zacharias, Karlee Burgess, Emily Zacharias, Lauren Lenentine	Kristy McDonald, Lisa Blixhavn, Leslie Wilson-Westcott, Raunora Westcott	$4,000	$1,600
2022	Lisa McLeod, Janelle Lach, Hallie McCannell, Jolene Callum	Alyssa Calvert, Stacey Irwin, Pam Robins, Roz Taylor	$6,000	$1,600
2024	Beth Peterson, Jenna Loder, Katherine Doerksen, Melissa Gordon-Kurz	Selena Sturmay, Danielle Schmiemann, Dezaray Hawes, Paige Papley	$10,000	
2025	Beth Peterson, Kelsey Calvert, Katherine Remillard, Melissa Gordon-Kurz	Sarah-Jane Sass, Katy Lukowich, Mackenzie Arbuckle, Julia Millan	$10,000	
