= 2024 Viterra Championship =

Manitoba's men's curling championship

- Host city: Stonewall, Manitoba
- Arena: Veterans Memorial Sports Complex
- Dates: February 7–11
- Winner: Team Carruthers
- Curling club: Granite CC, Winnipeg
- Skip: Brad Jacobs
- Third: Reid Carruthers
- Second: Derek Samagalski
- Lead: Connor Njegovan
- Coach: Rob Meakin
- Finalist: Braden Calvert

The 2024 Viterra Championship, Manitoba's provincial men's curling championship, was held from February 7 to 11 at the Veterans Memorial Sports Complex in Stonewall, Manitoba. The winning Reid Carruthers rink represented Manitoba at the 2024 Montana's Brier in Regina, Saskatchewan.

== Qualification process ==
Qualification method	Berths	Qualifying team(s)
2022–23 CTRS Berth	1	Reid Carruthers
2023–24 CTRS Berth	1	Ryan Wiebe
MCT Berth	4	Braden Calvert; Sean Grassie; Jordon McDonald; Riley Smith
Berth Bonspiel	1	Brett Walter
Brandon Men's Bonspiel	1	Travis Gregory
East Qualifier	3	Logan Ede; Justin Reynolds; Justin Richter
North Qualifier	1	Grant Brown
South Qualifiers	4	Jesse Janz; Mark Lowdon; Dean North; Jeremy Sundell
West Qualifiers	6	Cale Dunbar; Jace Freeman; Steve Irwin; Jeff Stewart; Greg Todoruk; Glenn Toews
Winnipeg Qualifier	7	Daniel Birchard; Derek Blanchard; Hayden Forrester; Thomas McGillivray; Darren Perche; Steen Sigurdson; Devon Wiebe
Manitoba Open	3	Andrew Irving; Greg Melnichuk; Brad Micholson

== Teams ==
The teams are listed as follows:

Skip	Third	Second	Lead	Alternate	Coach	Club
Daniel Birchard	Kelly Fordyce	Brody Moore	Andrew Peck	Paolo Aquila		Pembina CC
Derek Blanchard	Taylor McIntyre	Danial Gagne	Greg Blanchard	Joey Witherspoon		Assiniboine Memorial CC
Grant Brown	Rylan Young	Tuffy Seguin	Brandon Fell			Burntwood CC
Braden Calvert	Corey Chambers	Kyle Kurz	Brendan Bilawka			Fort Rouge CC
Brad Jacobs	Reid Carruthers	Derek Samagalski	Connor Njegovan		Rob Meakin	Granite CC
Cale Dunbar	Shanyne MacGranachan	Kyle Sambrook	Chris Campbell		Lorne Sambrook	Brandon CC
Logan Ede	Reece Hamm	Emerson Klimpke	Ryan Zapotochny		Blaine Malo	Stonewall CC
Hayden Forrester	Cyrus Brandt	Brennan Sampson	Gabriel Brandt	Curt Brandt		Fort Rouge CC
Jace Freeman	Ryan Ostrowsky	Nick Senff	Luke Robins	Brandon Jorgensen	Graham Freeman	Virden CC
Sean Grassie	Jordan Johnson	Daryl Evans	Rodney Legault			Deer Lodge CC
Travis Gregory	Wes Gregory	Quinn Robins	Dale Little			Hamiota CC
Andrew Irving	Brad Van Walleghem	Alex Forrest	Roy Janz	Jared Brown		Fort Rouge CC
Steve Irwin	Daley Peters	Travis Taylor	Travis Brooks		Shawn Taylor	Brandon CC
Jesse Janz	Ryan Thomson	Cody Chatham	Scott Crayston			Baldur CC
Mark Lowdon	Jason Yates	Anthony Dyck	Lawson Yates	Chris Lippens		La Salle CC
Jordon McDonald	Dallas Burgess	Elias Huminicki	Cameron Olafson		William Lyburn	Assiniboine Memorial CC
Thomas McGillivray	Tim Johnson	Aaron MacDonell	Alexandre Fontaine			St. Vital CC
Greg Melnichuk	Al Purdy	Bruce Wyche	Scott Kidd			Granite CC
Brad Micholson	Ian Campbell	Ryan Lagace	Paul Neilands	Norm Gautron		Deer Lodge CC
Dean North	Brad Wainikka	Rob Van Deynze	Mike Orchard	Mike Johnson		Carman CC
Darren Perche	Jason Perche	Shane Perche	Byrce Perche	Clint Stuart		Charleswood CC
Justin Reynolds	Nick Weshnoweski	Josh Maisey	Sean Giesbrecht	Dan LeBlanc		Winnipeg Beach CC
Justin Richter	Kyle Einarson	Jared Litke	Mitch Einarson			Beausejour CC
Steen Sigurdson	Josh Claeys	Scott Bruce	Scott Peterson			Deer Lodge CC
Riley Smith	Nick Curtis	Jared Hancox	Justin Twiss			Charleswood CC
Jeff Stewart	Eric Zamrykut	Jason Vinnell	Geoff Trimble	Alan Christison		Gladstone CC
Jeremy Sundell	Elliot Sundell	Paul Sundell	Thomas Huggart	Daniel Sundell		Holland CC
Greg Todoruk	Darcy Todoruk	Rob Fisher	Terron Stykalo			Dauphin CC
Glenn Toews	Nick Ogryzlo	Cory Toews	Steve Procyshyn			Dauphin CC
Brett Walter	JT Ryan	Graham McFarlane	Hugh McFarlane			Assiniboine Memorial CC
Devon Wiebe	Julien Leduc	Thomas Dunlop	Zack Bilawka	Brandon Radford		Charleswood CC
Ryan Wiebe	Ty Dilello	Sean Flatt	Adam Flatt	Don Harvey	Tom Clasper	Fort Rouge CC

== Knockout brackets ==
32 team double knockout with playoff round
Four teams qualify each from A Event and B Event

=== A event ===
First Knockout	Qualifier 1
Justin Reynolds	8
Jeff Stewart	6
Justin Reynolds	6
Ryan Wiebe	7
Ryan Wiebe	10
Grant Brown	3
Ryan Wiebe	7
Justin Richter	5
Jesse Janz	8
Sean Grassie	6
Jesse Janz	2
Justin Richter	9
Justin Richter	9
Dean North	3

First Knockout	Qualifier 2
Greg Melnichuk	2
Jace Freeman	5
Jace Freeman	5
Greg Todoruk	7
Steve Irwin	7
Greg Todoruk	9
Greg Todoruk	2
Braden Calvert	5
Jeremy Sundell	5
Braden Calvert	10
Braden Calvert	6
Derek Blanchard	4
Steen Sigurdson	4
Derek Blanchard	8

First Knockout	Qualifier 3
Cale Dunbar	8
Andrew Irving	7
Cale Dunbar	4
Jordon McDonald	7
Jordon McDonald	8
Glenn Toews	2
Jordon McDonald	6
Brett Walter	2
Travis Gregory	4
Brett Walter	9
Brett Walter	9
Hayden Forrester	0
Daniel Birchard	5
Hayden Forrester	6

First Knockout	Qualifier 4
Thomas McGillivray	3
Logan Ede	9
Logan Ede	2
Team Carruthers	3
Team Carruthers	9
Brad Micholson	1
Team Carruthers	7
Riley Smith	8
Mark Lowdon	5
Riley Smith	8
Riley Smith	7
Devon Wiebe	6
Devon Wiebe	9
Darren Perche	1

=== B event ===
Second Knockout	Qualifier 5
Jesse Janz	4
Jeff Stewart	11	Jeff Stewart	9	Justin Richter	6
Grant Brown	1	Jeff Stewart	6	Jeff Stewart	7
Justin Reynolds	5
Justin Reynolds	10
Sean Grassie	6	Sean Grassie	5
Dean North	5

Second Knockout	Qualifier 6
Derek Blanchard	5
Greg Melnichuk	5	Steve Irwin	8	Greg Todoruk	7
Steve Irwin	7	Steve Irwin	6	Steve Irwin	0
Jace Freeman	4
Jace Freeman	8
Jeremy Sundell	1	Steen Sigurdson	2
Steen Sigurdson	8

Second Knockout	Qualifier 7
Hayden Forrester	9
Andrew Irving	8	Andrew Irving	7	Brett Walter	9
Glenn Toews	6	Hayden Forrester	3	Cale Dunbar	2
Cale Dunbar	6
Cale Dunbar	8
Travis Gregory	8	Travis Gregory	5
Daniel Birchard	4

Second Knockout	Qualifier 8
Devon Wiebe	7
Thomas McGillivray	9	Thomas McGillivray	3	Team Carruthers	9
Brad Micholson	2	Devon Wiebe	7	Logan Ede	2
Logan Ede	8
Logan Ede	9
Mark Lowdon	9	Darren Perche	2
Darren Perche	12

== Knockout Results ==
All draw times listed in Central Time (UTC−06:00).

=== Draw 1 ===
Wednesday, February 7, 8:30 am

Sheet A	1	2	3	4	5	6	7	8	9	10	Final
Justin Reynolds 🔨	0	0	1	0	0	4	0	2	0	1	8
Jeff Stewart	0	2	0	2	0	0	1	0	1	0	6

Sheet B	1	2	3	4	5	6	7	8	9	10	Final
Ryan Wiebe 🔨	2	0	3	0	4	1	X	X	X	X	10
Grant Brown	0	1	0	2	0	0	X	X	X	X	3

Sheet C	1	2	3	4	5	6	7	8	9	10	Final
Jesse Janz 🔨	1	0	0	1	1	0	3	0	2	0	8
Sean Grassie	0	1	0	0	0	2	0	1	0	2	6

Sheet D	1	2	3	4	5	6	7	8	9	10	Final
Justin Richter 🔨	2	0	1	0	1	0	0	5	X	X	9
Dean North	0	1	0	1	0	0	1	0	X	X	3

Sheet E	1	2	3	4	5	6	7	8	9	10	Final
Greg Melnichuk	0	0	0	1	0	0	1	0	0	X	2
Jace Freeman 🔨	0	1	0	0	2	1	0	0	1	X	5

=== Draw 2 ===
Wednesday, February 7, 12:15 pm

Sheet A	1	2	3	4	5	6	7	8	9	10	Final
Glenn Toews 🔨	2	0	0	0	0	0	X	X	X	X	2
Jordon McDonald	0	3	3	1	0	1	X	X	X	X	8

Sheet B	1	2	3	4	5	6	7	8	9	10	11	Final
Cale Dunbar 🔨	0	2	0	0	2	0	2	0	1	0	1	8
Andrew Irving	1	0	2	0	0	3	0	0	0	1	0	7

Sheet C	1	2	3	4	5	6	7	8	9	10	Final
Steen Sigurdson 🔨	0	0	3	0	1	0	0	0	0	0	4
Derek Blanchard	1	0	0	2	0	1	1	1	1	1	8

Sheet D	1	2	3	4	5	6	7	8	9	10	Final
Jeremy Sundell 🔨	0	0	2	0	0	1	0	2	0	X	5
Braden Calvert	2	1	0	2	2	0	2	0	1	X	10

Sheet E	1	2	3	4	5	6	7	8	9	10	Final
Steve Irwin	0	0	1	0	0	0	2	2	2	0	7
Greg Todoruk 🔨	2	1	0	2	1	2	0	0	0	1	9

=== Draw 3 ===
Wednesday, February 7, 4:00 pm

Sheet A	1	2	3	4	5	6	7	8	9	10	Final
Mark Lowdon 🔨	1	0	0	2	0	0	1	0	1	X	5
Riley Smith	0	3	2	0	0	1	0	2	0	X	8

Sheet B	1	2	3	4	5	6	7	8	9	10	Final
Daniel Birchard	0	0	0	2	2	0	1	0	0	0	5
Hayden Forrester 🔨	0	1	2	0	0	2	0	1	0	0	6

Sheet C	1	2	3	4	5	6	7	8	9	10	Final
Thomas McGillivray	0	0	1	0	1	0	1	0	0	X	3
Logan Ede 🔨	1	2	0	1	0	3	0	1	1	X	9

Sheet D	1	2	3	4	5	6	7	8	9	10	Final
Team Carruthers 🔨	3	2	0	2	1	1	X	X	X	X	9
Brad Micholson	0	0	1	0	0	0	X	X	X	X	1

Sheet E	1	2	3	4	5	6	7	8	9	10	Final
Travis Gregory	0	1	0	1	0	0	1	1	0	X	4
Brett Walter 🔨	2	0	1	0	2	2	0	0	2	X	9

=== Draw 4 ===
Wednesday, February 7, 8:15 pm

Sheet A	1	2	3	4	5	6	7	8	9	10	Final
Sean Grassie 🔨	0	1	1	0	1	0	1	1	0	1	6
Dean North	1	0	0	3	0	1	0	0	0	0	5

Sheet B	1	2	3	4	5	6	7	8	9	10	Final
Jeremy Sundell	0	1	0	0	0	0	0	0	X	X	1
Steen Sigurdson 🔨	1	0	3	0	2	1	1	0	X	X	8

Sheet C	1	2	3	4	5	6	7	8	9	10	Final
Jeff Stewart 🔨	2	3	1	2	0	3	X	X	X	X	11
Grant Brown	0	0	0	0	1	0	X	X	X	X	1

Sheet D	1	2	3	4	5	6	7	8	9	10	11	Final
Greg Melnichuk 🔨	1	0	0	1	1	0	0	1	0	1	0	5
Steve Irwin	0	0	1	0	0	2	1	0	1	0	2	7

Sheet E	1	2	3	4	5	6	7	8	9	10	Final
Devon Wiebe	0	2	0	2	1	4	X	X	X	X	9
Darren Perche 🔨	1	0	0	0	0	0	X	X	X	X	1

=== Draw 5 ===
Thursday, February 8, 8:30 am

Sheet A	1	2	3	4	5	6	7	8	9	10	Final
Travis Gregory	0	1	1	2	0	0	1	0	2	1	8
Daniel Birchard 🔨	0	0	0	0	1	2	0	1	0	0	4

Sheet B	1	2	3	4	5	6	7	8	9	10	Final
Braden Calvert 🔨	2	0	0	1	0	2	0	1	0	X	6
Derek Blanchard	0	1	0	0	1	0	1	0	1	X	4

Sheet C	1	2	3	4	5	6	7	8	9	10	Final
Brett Walter 🔨	2	1	1	2	3	X	X	X	X	X	9
Hayden Forrester	0	0	0	0	0	X	X	X	X	X	0

Sheet D	1	2	3	4	5	6	7	8	9	10	Final
Andrew Irving 🔨	0	1	0	1	0	2	2	0	1	1	8
Glenn Toews	0	0	1	0	2	0	0	3	0	0	6

Sheet E	1	2	3	4	5	6	7	8	9	10	Final
Cale Dunbar	0	0	1	1	1	0	1	0	0	X	4
Jordon McDonald 🔨	0	3	0	0	0	1	0	2	1	X	7

=== Draw 6 ===
Thursday, February 8, 12:15 pm

Sheet A	1	2	3	4	5	6	7	8	9	10	Final
Jesse Janz 🔨	0	0	0	0	2	0	0	X	X	X	2
Justin Richter	1	1	0	4	0	0	3	X	X	X	9

Sheet B	1	2	3	4	5	6	7	8	9	10	Final
Jace Freeman 🔨	0	0	3	0	0	1	0	1	0	0	5
Greg Todoruk	0	1	0	1	1	0	1	0	2	1	7

Sheet C	1	2	3	4	5	6	7	8	9	10	Final
Riley Smith 🔨	0	0	0	0	0	5	0	1	0	1	7
Devon Wiebe	0	0	1	1	1	0	2	0	1	0	6

Sheet D	1	2	3	4	5	6	7	8	9	10	11	Final
Justin Reynolds	0	1	0	0	0	3	0	0	1	1	0	6
Ryan Wiebe 🔨	2	0	0	1	1	0	2	0	0	0	1	7

Sheet E	1	2	3	4	5	6	7	8	9	10	Final
Logan Ede	0	1	0	0	0	0	0	1	0	0	2
Team Carruthers 🔨	2	0	0	0	0	0	0	0	0	1	3

=== Draw 7 ===
Thursday, February 8, 4:00 pm

Sheet A	1	2	3	4	5	6	7	8	9	10	Final
Thomas McGillivray 🔨	2	0	0	2	0	1	1	3	X	X	9
Brad Micholson	0	1	0	0	1	0	0	0	X	X	2

Sheet B	1	2	3	4	5	6	7	8	9	10	Final
Travis Gregory 🔨	0	2	0	0	1	0	1	0	1	X	5
Cale Dunbar	0	0	3	0	0	2	0	3	0	X	8

Sheet C	1	2	3	4	5	6	7	8	9	10	Final
Steve Irwin	0	0	0	2	1	0	0	3	0	2	8
Derek Blanchard 🔨	1	1	1	0	0	1	0	0	1	0	5

Sheet D	1	2	3	4	5	6	7	8	9	10	11	Final
Mark Lowdon	0	1	2	0	2	0	0	1	2	1	0	9
Darren Perche 🔨	2	0	0	1	0	2	4	0	0	0	3	12

Sheet E	1	2	3	4	5	6	7	8	9	10	11	Final
Andrew Irving	0	0	2	0	1	0	1	0	2	1	0	7
Hayden Forrester 🔨	2	0	0	2	0	1	0	2	0	0	2	9

=== Draw 8 ===
Thursday, February 8, 7:45 pm

Sheet A	1	2	3	4	5	6	7	8	9	10	Final
Jace Freeman	1	2	1	0	0	2	1	1	X	X	8
Steen Sigurdson 🔨	0	0	0	0	2	0	0	0	X	X	2

Sheet B	1	2	3	4	5	6	7	8	9	10	Final
Jesse Janz 🔨	1	0	0	0	2	0	0	1	0	X	4
Jeff Stewart	0	0	2	2	0	2	1	0	2	X	9

Sheet C	1	2	3	4	5	6	7	8	9	10	Final
Darren Perche	0	2	0	0	0	X	X	X	X	X	2
Logan Ede 🔨	3	0	3	2	1	X	X	X	X	X	9

Sheet D	1	2	3	4	5	6	7	8	9	10	Final
Thomas McGillivray	0	0	0	0	2	0	0	1	0	X	3
Devon Wiebe 🔨	0	0	2	1	0	2	0	0	2	X	7

Sheet E	1	2	3	4	5	6	7	8	9	10	Final
Sean Grassie	0	1	0	2	1	0	0	1	0	X	5
Justin Reynolds 🔨	2	0	2	0	0	0	2	0	4	X	10

=== Draw 9 ===
Friday, February 9, 8:30 am

Sheet A	1	2	3	4	5	6	7	8	9	10	Final
Braden Calvert 🔨	0	2	0	1	0	0	0	2	0	X	5
Greg Todoruk	0	0	0	0	0	1	0	0	1	X	2

Sheet B	1	2	3	4	5	6	7	8	9	10	Final
Riley Smith	0	0	3	0	1	0	0	1	0	3	8
Team Carruthers 🔨	0	1	0	2	0	2	0	0	2	0	7

Sheet C	1	2	3	4	5	6	7	8	9	10	Final
Ryan Wiebe	0	3	0	0	2	0	1	0	0	1	7
Justin Richter 🔨	1	0	0	1	0	1	0	1	1	0	5

Sheet D	1	2	3	4	5	6	7	8	9	10	Final
Jordon McDonald	0	0	0	2	0	0	0	0	4	X	6
Brett Walter 🔨	0	0	2	0	0	0	0	0	0	X	2

=== Draw 10 ===
Friday, February 9, 12:15 pm

Sheet B	1	2	3	4	5	6	7	8	9	10	Final
Devon Wiebe 🔨	1	0	2	0	1	0	2	1	0	0	7
Logan Ede	0	1	0	3	0	1	0	0	2	1	8

Sheet C	1	2	3	4	5	6	7	8	9	10	Final
Justin Reynolds	1	0	0	1	0	1	1	1	0	0	5
Jeff Stewart 🔨	0	0	1	0	4	0	0	0	0	1	6

Sheet D	1	2	3	4	5	6	7	8	9	10	Final
Cale Dunbar	1	0	0	1	0	0	3	0	1	X	6
Hayden Forrester 🔨	0	1	0	0	1	0	0	1	0	X	3

Sheet E	1	2	3	4	5	6	7	8	9	10	Final
Steve Irwin 🔨	1	0	1	0	0	3	0	0	0	1	6
Jace Freeman	0	1	0	0	2	0	0	0	1	0	4

=== Draw 11 ===
Friday, February 9, 4:00 pm

Sheet A	1	2	3	4	5	6	7	8	9	10	Final
Team Carruthers 🔨	2	0	2	1	1	0	3	X	X	X	9
Logan Ede	0	1	0	0	0	1	0	X	X	X	2

Sheet B	1	2	3	4	5	6	7	8	9	10	Final
Brett Walter 🔨	0	1	2	1	0	0	5	X	X	X	9
Cale Dunbar	0	0	0	0	1	1	0	X	X	X	2

Sheet C	1	2	3	4	5	6	7	8	9	10	Final
Greg Todoruk	0	1	2	1	0	1	2	X	X	X	7
Steve Irwin 🔨	0	0	0	0	0	0	0	X	X	X	0

Sheet D	1	2	3	4	5	6	7	8	9	10	Final
Justin Richter	0	0	1	0	3	0	0	1	1	0	6
Jeff Stewart 🔨	1	1	0	1	0	1	1	0	0	2	7

== Playoff bracket ==
8 team double knockout
Four teams qualify into Championship Round

=== A Bracket ===
First Knockout
Q1	Ryan Wiebe	8
Q6	Greg Todoruk	6
Q2	Braden Calvert	12
Q5	Jeff Stewart	3

Qualifier 1
Q1	Ryan Wiebe	5
Q2	Braden Calvert	6

First Knockout
Q3	Jordon McDonald	7
Q8	Team Carruthers	8
Q4	Riley Smith	9
Q7	Brett Walter	8

Qualifier 2
Q8	Team Carruthers	8
Q4	Riley Smith	2

=== B Bracket ===
Second Knockout			Qualifier 3
			Q4	Riley Smith	6
Q6	Greg Todoruk	4	Q5	Jeff Stewart	8
Q5	Jeff Stewart	8

Second Knockout			Qualifier 4
			Q1	Ryan Wiebe	3
Q3	Jordon McDonald	9	Q3	Jordon McDonald	8
Q7	Brett Walter	4

== Playoff round results ==
=== Draw 12 ===
Friday, February 9, 7:45 pm

Sheet A	1	2	3	4	5	6	7	8	9	10	Final
Ryan Wiebe 🔨	1	0	2	0	2	0	2	0	1	X	8
Greg Todoruk	0	2	0	1	0	2	0	1	0	X	6

Sheet B	1	2	3	4	5	6	7	8	9	10	11	Final
Jordon McDonald 🔨	1	0	1	0	0	3	0	1	0	1	0	7
Team Carruthers	0	1	0	1	3	0	1	0	1	0	1	8

Sheet C	1	2	3	4	5	6	7	8	9	10	Final
Braden Calvert 🔨	0	1	1	2	0	3	0	5	X	X	12
Jeff Stewart	0	0	0	0	2	0	1	0	X	X	3

Sheet D	1	2	3	4	5	6	7	8	9	10	11	Final
Riley Smith 🔨	0	1	0	3	1	0	2	0	1	0	1	9
Brett Walter	0	0	2	0	0	2	0	2	0	2	0	8

=== Draw 13 ===
Saturday, February 10, 9:00 am

Sheet A	1	2	3	4	5	6	7	8	9	10	Final
Team Carruthers	0	3	1	0	3	1	X	X	X	X	8
Riley Smith 🔨	1	0	0	1	0	0	X	X	X	X	2

Sheet B	1	2	3	4	5	6	7	8	9	10	Final
Ryan Wiebe	0	0	2	0	0	1	0	0	2	0	5
Braden Calvert 🔨	0	1	0	1	0	0	2	1	0	1	6

Sheet C	1	2	3	4	5	6	7	8	9	10	Final
Jordon McDonald 🔨	0	2	0	2	0	2	1	2	X	X	9
Brett Walter	2	0	0	0	2	0	0	0	X	X	4

Sheet D	1	2	3	4	5	6	7	8	9	10	Final
Greg Todoruk	0	0	2	0	0	1	0	1	0	X	4
Jeff Stewart 🔨	1	4	0	1	0	0	1	0	1	X	8

=== Draw 14 ===
Saturday, February 10, 2:00 pm

Sheet A	1	2	3	4	5	6	7	8	9	10	Final
Ryan Wiebe 🔨	0	0	1	0	0	1	0	1	X	X	3
Jordon McDonald	0	0	0	1	2	0	5	0	X	X	8

Sheet C	1	2	3	4	5	6	7	8	9	10	Final
Riley Smith 🔨	0	1	0	2	0	0	1	1	0	1	6
Jeff Stewart	0	0	1	0	1	3	0	0	3	0	8

== Championship Round ==
Page playoff system
1	Braden Calvert	8
2	Team Carruthers	7
3	Jeff Stewart	3
4	Jordon McDonald	4

Semifinal
2	Team Carruthers	10
4	Jordon McDonald	7

Final
1	Braden Calvert	3
2	Team Carruthers	6

=== 1 vs. 2 ===
Saturday, February 10, 6:00 pm

Sheet C	1	2	3	4	5	6	7	8	9	10	11	Final
Braden Calvert 🔨	1	0	2	1	2	0	1	0	0	0	1	8
Team Carruthers	0	2	0	0	0	2	0	1	0	2	0	7

=== 3 vs. 4 ===
Saturday, February 10, 6:00 pm

Sheet D	1	2	3	4	5	6	7	8	9	10	Final
Jeff Stewart	0	1	0	0	0	0	1	0	1	0	3
Jordon McDonald 🔨	1	0	1	0	0	0	0	1	0	1	4

=== Semifinal ===
Sunday, February 11, 9:00 am

Sheet C	1	2	3	4	5	6	7	8	9	10	Final
Team Carruthers 🔨	2	0	1	0	0	2	0	2	0	3	10
Jordon McDonald	0	1	0	2	0	0	3	0	1	0	7

=== Final ===
Sunday, February 11, 2:30 pm

Sheet C	1	2	3	4	5	6	7	8	9	10	Final
Braden Calvert 🔨	2	0	0	1	0	0	0	0	0	0	3
Team Carruthers	0	2	0	0	0	1	0	1	0	2	6

2024 Viterra Championship

Team Carruthers
7th Manitoba Provincial Championship title
