= 2023 Viterra Championship =

Manitoba's men's curling championship

- Host city: Neepawa, Manitoba
- Arena: Yellowhead Community Recreation Centre
- Dates: February 8–12
- Winner: Team Dunstone
- Curling club: Fort Rouge CC, Winnipeg
- Skip: Matt Dunstone
- Third: B.J. Neufeld
- Second: Colton Lott
- Lead: Ryan Harnden
- Finalist: Reid Carruthers

The 2023 Viterra Championship, Manitoba's provincial men's curling championship, was held from February 8 to 12 at the Yellowstone Community Recreation Centre in Neepawa, Manitoba. The winning Matt Dunstone rink represented Manitoba at the 2023 Tim Hortons Brier in London, Ontario where they finished with a silver medal after losing in the final to Team Canada 7–5. The only two losses in the Brier by the Dunstone rink came against Team Canada.

Despite losing in the final, the Reid Carruthers rink still qualified for the Brier as the Wild Card #2 representative based on CTRS standings, where they finished fifth in Pool A with a 4–4 record.

== Qualification process ==
Qualification method	Berths	Qualifying team(s)
2021-22 CTRS Berth	1	Braden Calvert
2022-23 CTRS Berth	3	Reid Carruthers; Matt Dunstone; Ryan Wiebe
MCT Berth 2022	4	Corey Chambers; Steve Irwin; Steen Sigurdson; Riley Smith
Berth Bonspiel	2	Kelly Marnoch; ~~Jordon McDonald~~ (Note: Team McDonald opted out of provincials and was replaced by Team Kinnaird who was the next best team in the Berth Bonspiel who had not already qualified for provincials.); Jay Kinnaird
Brandon Men's Bonspiel	1	Hayden Forrester
East Qualifier	2	Wayne Ewasko; Justin Richter
North Qualifier	1	Tuffy Seguin
South Qualifiers	4	David Hamblin; Ryan Hyde; Steve Pauls; Grant Shewfelt
West Qualifiers	4	Cale Dunbar; Jace Freeman; Jeff Stewart; Rob Van Kommer
Winnipeg Qualifier	7	Daniel Birchard; Mark Franklin; Sean Grassie; Tanner Lott; Jordan Peters; J.T. Ryan; Brett Walter
Manitoba Open	3	Richard Muntain; Justin Reynolds; Joey Witherspoon

== Teams ==
The teams are listed as follows:

Skip	Third	Second	Lead	Alternate	Club
Daniel Birchard	Kelly Fordyce	Andrew Peck	Paolo Aquila	Brody Moore	Pembina CC
Braden Calvert	Kyle Kurz	Ian McMillan	Rob Gordon		Fort Rouge CC
Reid Carruthers	Derek Samagalski	Connor Njegovan	Matt Lorenz (Note: Matt Lorenz was listed as a lead for Team Carruthers but did not play as Carruthers opted to play with three players for provincials.)		Morris CC
Corey Chambers	Daley Peters	Julien Leduc	Brendan Bilawka	Michael Martin	Fort Garry CC
Cale Dunbar	Shanyne MacGranachan	Kyle Sambrook	Chris Campbell		Brandon CC
Matt Dunstone	B.J. Neufeld	Colton Lott	Ryan Harnden		Fort Rouge CC
Wayne Ewasko	Doug May	Lorne Ryall	Gord Stelmack		Beausejour CC
Hayden Forrester	Brennan Sampson	Cyrus Brandt	Alexandre Fontaine		Fort Rouge CC
Mark Franklin	Jamie Hay	Barry Campbell	Grez Ziemanski	Mike Mahon	Granite CC
Brooks Freeman (Note: Brooks Freeman skipped for his brother, Jace Freeman as Jace skipped his own team for the 2023 Canadian U18 Curling Championships in Timmons, Ontario that occurred at the same time.)	Thomas McGillivray	Ryan Ostrowsky	Aaron MacDonell	Jace Freeman	Virden CC
Sean Grassie	Jordon Johnson	Daryl Evans	Rodney Legault		Deer Lodge CC
David Hamblin	Kris Mazinke	Ron Vermette	Devin Vermette		Morris CC
Ryan Hyde	Kenneth Keeler	Hartley Vanstone	Trevor Munro	Ryan Brooks	Portage CC
Steve Irwin	Travis Taylor	Travis Brooks	Travis Saban		Brandon CC
Jay Kinnaird	James Hay	Kris Kinnaird	Sean McKean		Virden CC
Tanner Lott	Brad Van Walleghem	Wade Ford	Stu Shiells		Fort Rouge CC
Kelly Marnoch	Bart Witherspoon	Branden Jorgensen	Dean Smith	Justin Reischek	Carberry CC
Richard Muntain	Dean Dunstone	Al Purdy	Bruce Wyche		Granite CC
Steve Pauls	Clare Reimer	Bernie Hildebrand	Russell Pauls	Matthew Pauls	Pilot Mound CC
Jordan Peters	Andrew Clapham	Zack Bilawka	Cole Chandler		Fort Rouge CC
Justin Reynolds	Nick Weshnoweski	Josh Maisey	Sean Giesbrecht	Dan LeBlanc	Winnipeg Beach CC
Justin Richter	Kyle Einarson	Jared Litke	Mitch Einarson		Beausejour CC
JT Ryan	Colin Kurz	Austin Pearson	Brandon Radford		Assiniboine Memorial CC
Tuffy Seguin	Matt Violot	Sean McKenzie	Jack Bauer		Burntwood CC
Grant Shewfelt	Mike Johnson	Rob Van Deynze	Mike Orchard	Travis Johnson	Baldur CC
Steen Sigurdson	Josh Claeys	Scott Bruce	Scott Peterson		Assiniboine Memorial CC
Riley Smith	Nick Curtis	Jared Hancox	Justin Twiss		Thistle CC
Jeff Stewart	Eric Zamrykut	Austin Mustard	Geoff Trimble	Matthew Kulbacki	Gladstone CC
Rob Van Kommer	Evan Reynolds	Jefferey Steen	Seth White	Albert Naismith	Carberry CC
Brett Walter	Graham McFarlane	Devon Wiebe	Hugh McFarlane		Assiniboine Memorial CC
Ryan Wiebe	Ty Dilello	Sean Flatt	Adam Flatt		Fort Rouge CC
Joey Witherspoon	Taylor McIntyre	Derek Blanchard	Trevor Calvert		Assiniboine Memorial CC

== Knockout Brackets ==
32 team double knockout with playoff round
Four teams qualify each from A Event and B Event

=== A event ===
First Knockout	Qualifier 1
Joey Witherspoon	9
Daniel Birchard	5
Joey Witherspoon	4
Reid Carruthers	9
Reid Carruthers	8
Rob Van Kommer	0
Reid Carruthers	5
Steve Irwin	7
Justin Reynolds	6
Steve Irwin	7
Steve Irwin	11
Sean Grassie	5
Sean Grassie	9
Ryan Hyde	4

First Knockout	Qualifier 2
Cale Dunbar	5
J.T. Ryan	12
J.T. Ryan	3
Riley Smith	4
Riley Smith	10
Steve Pauls	4
Riley Smith	4
Ryan Wiebe	8
Mark Franklin	2
Ryan Wiebe	13
Ryan Wiebe	7
Jeff Stewart	5
Kelly Marnoch	4
Jeff Stewart	6

First Knockout	Qualifier 3
David Hamblin	8
Steen Sigurdson	9
Steen Sigurdson	5
Corey Chambers	6
Corey Chambers	9
Wayne Ewasko	3
Corey Chambers	4
Braden Calvert	6
Grant Shewfelt	4
Braden Calvert	9
Braden Calvert	10
Tanner Lott	3
Tanner Lott	9
Richard Muntain	2

First Knockout	Qualifier 4
Justin Richter	9
Hayden Forrester	6
Justin Richter	4
Matt Dunstone	5
Matt Dunstone	10
Tuffy Seguin	1
Matt Dunstone	13
Brett Walter	7
Jace Freeman	4
Brett Walter	11
Brett Walter	12
Jordan Peters	9
Jordan Peters	10
Jay Kinnaird	3

=== B event ===
Second Knockout	Qualifier 5
Sean Grassie	7
Daniel Birchard	8	Daniel Birchard	5	Reid Carruthers	7
Rob Van Kommer	4	Sean Grassie	7	Sean Grassie	4
Justin Reynolds	3
Joey Witherspoon	4
Justin Reynolds	11	Justin Reynolds	5
Ryan Hyde	1

Second Knockout	Qualifier 6
Jeff Stewart	10
Cale Dunbar	9	Cale Dunbar	2	Riley Smith	6
Steve Pauls	2	Jeff Stewart	5	J.T. Ryan	7
J.T. Ryan	6
J.T. Ryan	10
Mark Franklin	3	Kelly Marnoch	5
Kelly Marnoch	10

Second Knockout	Qualifier 7
Tanner Lott	11
David Hamblin	12	David Hamblin	5	Corey Chambers	9
Wayne Ewasko	4	Tanner Lott	8	Tanner Lott	7
Steen Sigurdson	5
Steen Sigurdson	8
Grant Shewfelt	4	Richard Muntain	5
Richard Muntain	6

Second Knockout	Qualifier 8
Jordan Peters	9
Hayden Forrester	13	Hayden Forrester	2	Brett Walter	1
Tuffy Seguin	1	Jordan Peters	0	Justin Richter	10
Justin Richter	10
Justin Richter	7
Jace Freeman	10	Jace Freeman	5
Jay Kinnaird	6

== Knockout Results ==
All draw times listed in Central Time (UTC−06:00).

=== Draw 1 ===
Wednesday, February 8, 8:30 am

Sheet A	1	2	3	4	5	6	7	8	9	10	Final
Daniel Birchard 🔨	0	1	0	0	0	1	0	3	0	X	5
Joey Witherspoon	1	0	1	1	1	0	2	0	3	X	9

Sheet B	1	2	3	4	5	6	7	8	9	10	Final
Rob Van Kommer	0	0	0	0	0	0	X	X	X	X	0
Reid Carruthers 🔨	1	3	2	0	0	2	X	X	X	X	8

Sheet C	1	2	3	4	5	6	7	8	9	10	Final
Justin Reynolds	0	1	0	0	0	1	2	1	1	0	6
Steve Irwin 🔨	2	0	0	0	1	0	0	0	0	4	7

Sheet D	1	2	3	4	5	6	7	8	9	10	Final
Ryan Hyde	1	0	0	1	1	0	1	0	X	X	4
Sean Grassie 🔨	0	1	3	0	0	2	0	3	X	X	9

Sheet E	1	2	3	4	5	6	7	8	9	10	Final
J.T. Ryan 🔨	0	1	1	5	0	1	0	4	X	X	12
Cale Dunbar	1	0	0	0	2	0	2	0	X	X	5

=== Draw 2 ===
Wednesday, February 8, 12:15 pm

Sheet A	1	2	3	4	5	6	7	8	9	10	Final
Wayne Ewasko 🔨	0	0	1	0	2	0	X	X	X	X	3
Corey Chambers	3	1	0	1	0	4	X	X	X	X	9

Sheet B	1	2	3	4	5	6	7	8	9	10	11	Final
David Hamblin	1	0	1	0	2	0	3	0	0	1	0	8
Steen Sigurdson 🔨	0	0	0	2	0	2	0	3	1	0	1	9

Sheet C	1	2	3	4	5	6	7	8	9	10	Final
Jeff Stewart	0	0	0	2	0	0	0	1	0	3	6
Kelly Marnoch 🔨	0	2	0	0	1	0	0	0	1	0	4

Sheet D	1	2	3	4	5	6	7	8	9	10	Final
Mark Franklin	0	1	0	0	0	1	0	X	X	X	2
Ryan Wiebe 🔨	2	0	2	0	3	0	6	X	X	X	13

Sheet E	1	2	3	4	5	6	7	8	9	10	Final
Riley Smith 🔨	0	0	0	2	0	2	0	4	2	X	10
Steve Pauls	0	1	1	0	1	0	1	0	0	X	4

=== Draw 3 ===
Wednesday, February 8, 4:00 pm

Sheet A	1	2	3	4	5	6	7	8	9	10	Final
Jace Freeman 🔨	0	1	0	1	0	1	1	0	0	X	4
Brett Walter	3	0	3	0	1	0	0	1	3	X	11

Sheet B	1	2	3	4	5	6	7	8	9	10	Final
Tanner Lott 🔨	2	3	1	0	0	2	1	0	X	X	9
Richard Muntain	0	0	0	1	1	0	0	0	X	X	2

Sheet C	1	2	3	4	5	6	7	8	9	10	Final
Justin Richter 🔨	1	0	0	2	2	0	4	0	0	0	9
Hayden Forrester	0	3	1	0	0	1	0	0	1	0	6

Sheet D	1	2	3	4	5	6	7	8	9	10	Final
Matt Dunstone 🔨	3	1	0	5	1	0	X	X	X	X	10
Tuffy Seguin	0	0	1	0	0	0	X	X	X	X	1

Sheet E	1	2	3	4	5	6	7	8	9	10	Final
Braden Calvert 🔨	0	2	1	0	1	0	2	0	3	X	9
Grant Shewfelt	0	0	0	2	0	1	0	1	0	X	4

=== Draw 4 ===
Wednesday, February 8, 8:00 pm

Sheet A	1	2	3	4	5	6	7	8	9	10	Final
Justin Reynolds 🔨	3	0	3	2	3	X	X	X	X	X	11
Ryan Hyde	0	1	0	0	0	X	X	X	X	X	1

Sheet B	1	2	3	4	5	6	7	8	9	10	Final
Kelly Marnoch	4	0	0	0	0	3	3	X	X	X	10
Mark Franklin 🔨	0	1	1	0	1	0	0	X	X	X	3

Sheet C	1	2	3	4	5	6	7	8	9	10	Final
Daniel Birchard	1	0	0	2	1	0	4	X	X	X	8
Rob Van Kommer 🔨	0	1	1	0	0	2	0	X	X	X	4

Sheet D	1	2	3	4	5	6	7	8	9	10	Final
Cale Dunbar 🔨	0	3	0	2	3	1	X	X	X	X	9
Steve Pauls	1	0	1	0	0	0	X	X	X	X	2

Sheet E	1	2	3	4	5	6	7	8	9	10	Final
Jordan Peters	1	0	0	2	0	3	2	2	X	X	10
Jay Kinnaird 🔨	0	1	0	0	2	0	0	0	X	X	3

=== Draw 5 ===
Thursday, February 9, 8:30 am

Sheet A	1	2	3	4	5	6	7	8	9	10	Final
Grant Shewfelt	0	0	0	1	0	1	0	1	1	0	4
Richard Muntain 🔨	1	1	1	0	0	0	2	0	0	1	6

Sheet B	1	2	3	4	5	6	7	8	9	10	Final
Jeff Stewart	0	0	3	0	1	0	0	0	1	X	5
Ryan Wiebe 🔨	3	1	0	2	0	0	0	1	0	X	7

Sheet C	1	2	3	4	5	6	7	8	9	10	Final
Braden Calvert 🔨	2	0	0	2	1	0	3	2	X	X	10
Tanner Lott	0	1	0	0	0	2	0	0	X	X	3

Sheet D	1	2	3	4	5	6	7	8	9	10	Final
Wayne Ewasko	1	0	1	0	0	0	2	0	X	X	4
David Hamblin 🔨	0	3	0	3	1	1	0	4	X	X	12

Sheet E	1	2	3	4	5	6	7	8	9	10	Final
Steen Sigurdson	0	1	1	1	0	0	0	2	0	0	5
Corey Chambers 🔨	1	0	0	0	2	0	0	0	2	1	6

=== Draw 6 ===
Thursday, February 9, 12:15 pm

Sheet A	1	2	3	4	5	6	7	8	9	10	Final
Sean Grassie 🔨	0	0	4	0	0	1	0	0	X	X	5
Steve Irwin	1	3	0	3	1	0	1	2	X	X	11

Sheet B	1	2	3	4	5	6	7	8	9	10	Final
Riley Smith 🔨	1	0	0	0	1	0	1	0	0	1	4
J.T. Ryan	0	0	0	1	0	1	0	1	0	0	3

Sheet C	1	2	3	4	5	6	7	8	9	10	Final
Jordan Peters 🔨	1	0	3	2	0	2	0	1	0	0	9
Brett Walter	0	2	0	0	4	0	2	0	0	4	12

Sheet D	1	2	3	4	5	6	7	8	9	10	Final
Reid Carruthers 🔨	2	1	1	0	3	0	2	X	X	X	9
Joey Witherspoon	0	0	0	2	0	2	0	X	X	X	4

Sheet E	1	2	3	4	5	6	7	8	9	10	Final
Matt Dunstone 🔨	0	2	1	0	0	1	0	0	0	1	5
Justin Richter	0	0	0	0	2	0	0	1	1	0	4

=== Draw 7 ===
Thursday, February 9, 4:00 pm

Sheet A	1	2	3	4	5	6	7	8	9	10	Final
Hayden Forrester 🔨	3	2	2	2	0	4	X	X	X	X	13
Tuffy Seguin	0	0	0	0	1	0	X	X	X	X	1

Sheet B	1	2	3	4	5	6	7	8	9	10	Final
Richard Muntain 🔨	0	2	0	0	3	0	0	0	0	X	5
Steen Sigurdson	1	0	3	1	0	1	0	1	1	X	8

Sheet C	1	2	3	4	5	6	7	8	9	10	Final
Cale Dunbar 🔨	0	0	0	2	0	0	0	X	X	X	2
Jeff Stewart	1	2	1	0	2	2	2	X	X	X	10

Sheet D	1	2	3	4	5	6	7	8	9	10	Final
Jay Kinnaird 🔨	0	0	0	0	5	0	1	0	0	X	6
Jace Freeman	1	0	1	3	0	1	0	3	1	X	10

Sheet E	1	2	3	4	5	6	7	8	9	10	Final
Tanner Lott 🔨	0	2	0	2	0	4	0	3	X	X	11
David Hamblin	0	0	2	0	2	0	1	0	X	X	5

=== Draw 8 ===
Thursday, February 9, 7:45 pm

Sheet A	1	2	3	4	5	6	7	8	9	10	Final
Kelly Marnoch 🔨	2	0	0	2	0	0	1	0	X	X	5
J.T. Ryan	0	1	3	0	1	0	0	5	X	X	10

Sheet B	1	2	3	4	5	6	7	8	9	10	Final
Daniel Birchard 🔨	1	1	0	0	0	1	1	0	1	X	5
Sean Grassie	0	0	1	2	1	0	0	3	0	X	7

Sheet C	1	2	3	4	5	6	7	8	9	10	Final
Justin Richter	1	0	0	1	0	1	0	3	0	1	7
Jace Freeman 🔨	0	1	1	0	1	0	2	0	0	0	5

Sheet D	1	2	3	4	5	6	7	8	9	10	Final
Jordan Peters 🔨	1	3	1	3	0	1	X	X	X	X	9
Hayden Forrester	0	0	0	0	2	0	X	X	X	X	2

Sheet E	1	2	3	4	5	6	7	8	9	10	Final
Justin Reynolds 🔨	0	0	0	1	0	1	1	0	1	1	5
Joey Witherspoon	0	1	0	0	2	0	0	1	0	0	4

=== Draw 9 ===
Friday, February 10, 8:30 am

Sheet A	1	2	3	4	5	6	7	8	9	10	Final
Riley Smith 🔨	0	1	0	0	0	1	0	2	0	X	4
Ryan Wiebe	0	0	1	2	2	0	1	0	2	X	8

Sheet B	1	2	3	4	5	6	7	8	9	10	Final
Matt Dunstone 🔨	3	0	2	0	0	4	0	4	X	X	13
Brett Walter	0	2	0	2	1	0	2	0	X	X	7

Sheet C	1	2	3	4	5	6	7	8	9	10	11	Final
Reid Carruthers	0	0	0	1	0	0	1	1	0	2	0	5
Steve Irwin 🔨	0	1	1	0	2	0	0	0	1	0	2	7

Sheet D	1	2	3	4	5	6	7	8	9	10	Final
Braden Calvert 🔨	2	0	1	0	0	1	0	0	1	1	6
Corey Chambers	0	1	0	1	0	0	1	1	0	0	4

=== Draw 10 ===
Friday, February 10, 12:15 pm

Sheet B	1	2	3	4	5	6	7	8	9	10	Final
Jordan Peters	0	0	0	0	0	0	X	X	X	X	0
Justin Richter 🔨	0	3	1	1	2	3	X	X	X	X	10

Sheet C	1	2	3	4	5	6	7	8	9	10	Final
Justin Reynolds 🔨	0	0	0	2	0	0	0	1	0	0	3
Sean Grassie	0	1	0	0	2	0	1	0	1	2	7

Sheet D	1	2	3	4	5	6	7	8	9	10	Final
Steen Sigurdson	0	0	1	0	0	3	0	1	0	0	5
Tanner Lott 🔨	0	1	0	2	2	0	1	0	1	1	8

Sheet E	1	2	3	4	5	6	7	8	9	10	Final
Jeff Stewart	0	1	0	0	4	0	0	0	0	0	5
J.T. Ryan 🔨	0	0	1	0	0	1	1	1	0	2	6

=== Draw 11 ===
Friday, February 10, 4:00 pm

Sheet A	1	2	3	4	5	6	7	8	9	10	Final
Justin Richter 🔨	0	4	2	1	3	X	X	X	X	X	10
Brett Walter	1	0	0	0	0	X	X	X	X	X	1

Sheet B	1	2	3	4	5	6	7	8	9	10	Final
Tanner Lott 🔨	2	1	0	0	0	0	2	1	0	1	7
Corey Chambers	0	0	0	2	2	1	0	0	4	0	9

Sheet C	1	2	3	4	5	6	7	8	9	10	Final
J.T. Ryan	1	0	0	1	0	0	2	2	0	1	7
Riley Smith 🔨	0	0	2	0	0	2	0	0	2	0	6

Sheet D	1	2	3	4	5	6	7	8	9	10	Final
Reid Carruthers	0	1	0	2	0	2	1	0	0	1	7
Sean Grassie 🔨	0	0	1	0	2	0	0	1	0	0	4

== Playoff Bracket ==
8 team double knockout
Four teams qualify into Championship Round

=== A bracket ===
First Knockout
Q1	Steve Irwin	9
Q6	J.T. Ryan	2
Q2	Ryan Wiebe	4
Q5	Reid Carruthers	7

Qualifier 1
Q1	Steve Irwin	8
Q5	Reid Carruthers	10

First Knockout
Q3	Braden Calvert	9
Q8	Justin Richter	3
Q4	Matt Dunstone	7
Q7	Corey Chambers	2

Qualifier 2
Q3	Braden Calvert	8
Q4	Matt Dunstone	4

=== B bracket ===
Second Knockout			Qualifier 3
			Q4	Matt Dunstone	7
Q6	J.T. Ryan	5	Q2	Ryan Wiebe	1
Q2	Ryan Wiebe	9

Second Knockout			Qualifier 4
			Q1	Steve Irwin	9
Q8	Justin Richter	4	Q7	Corey Chambers	8
Q7	Corey Chambers	5

== Playoff Round Results ==
=== Draw 12 ===
Friday, February 10, 7:45 pm

Sheet A	1	2	3	4	5	6	7	8	9	10	Final
J.T. Ryan	0	0	0	2	0	0	0	X	X	X	2
Steve Irwin 🔨	1	1	1	0	1	2	3	X	X	X	9

Sheet B	1	2	3	4	5	6	7	8	9	10	Final
Braden Calvert 🔨	0	0	2	1	0	2	3	1	X	X	9
Justin Richter	1	1	0	0	1	0	0	0	X	X	3

Sheet C	1	2	3	4	5	6	7	8	9	10	Final
Ryan Wiebe 🔨	1	1	0	1	0	0	1	0	0	X	4
Reid Carruthers	0	0	2	0	0	1	0	3	1	X	7

Sheet D	1	2	3	4	5	6	7	8	9	10	Final
Matt Dunstone 🔨	2	0	4	1	0	X	X	X	X	X	7
Corey Chambers	0	1	0	0	1	X	X	X	X	X	2

=== Draw 13 ===
Saturday, February 11, 9:00 am

Sheet A	1	2	3	4	5	6	7	8	9	10	Final
Braden Calvert 🔨	1	0	1	0	4	0	1	0	1	X	8
Matt Dunstone	0	0	0	2	0	1	0	1	0	X	4

Sheet B	1	2	3	4	5	6	7	8	9	10	Final
Steve Irwin 🔨	2	0	3	2	0	0	0	0	1	0	8
Reid Carruthers	0	1	0	0	3	1	2	2	0	1	10

Sheet C	1	2	3	4	5	6	7	8	9	10	Final
Corey Chambers	1	0	1	0	0	1	0	1	0	1	5
Justin Richter 🔨	0	1	0	1	0	0	1	0	1	0	4

Sheet D	1	2	3	4	5	6	7	8	9	10	Final
Ryan Wiebe 🔨	3	0	2	0	1	0	1	0	2	X	9
J.T. Ryan	0	1	0	1	0	3	0	0	0	X	5

=== Draw 14 ===
Saturday, February 11, 1:30 pm

Sheet A	1	2	3	4	5	6	7	8	9	10	11	Final
Steve Irwin 🔨	0	1	0	3	0	0	2	0	2	0	1	9
Corey Chambers	0	0	1	0	4	2	0	0	0	1	0	8

Sheet C	1	2	3	4	5	6	7	8	9	10	Final
Ryan Wiebe	0	0	1	0	0	0	X	X	X	X	1
Matt Dunstone 🔨	2	2	0	1	1	1	X	X	X	X	7

== Championship Round ==
Page playoff system
1	Reid Carruthers	7
2	Braden Calvert	4
3	Matt Dunstone	8
4	Steve Irwin	2

Semifinal
2	Braden Calvert	4
3	Matt Dunstone	8

Final
1	Reid Carruthers	7
3	Matt Dunstone	8

=== 1 vs. 2 ===
Saturday, February 11, 6:00 pm

Sheet C	1	2	3	4	5	6	7	8	9	10	Final
Braden Calvert 🔨	0	0	1	0	0	2	1	0	0	X	4
Reid Carruthers	0	1	0	1	0	0	0	2	3	X	7

=== 3 vs. 4 ===
Saturday, February 11, 6:00 pm

Sheet B	1	2	3	4	5	6	7	8	9	10	Final
Matt Dunstone 🔨	3	0	3	2	0	X	X	X	X	X	8
Steve Irwin	0	1	0	0	1	X	X	X	X	X	2

=== Semifinal ===
Sunday, February 12, 9:00 am

Sheet D	1	2	3	4	5	6	7	8	9	10	Final
Matt Dunstone	0	2	0	1	0	3	2	0	X	X	8
Braden Calvert 🔨	1	0	1	0	1	0	0	1	X	X	4

=== Final ===
Sunday, February 12, 2:30 pm

Sheet C	1	2	3	4	5	6	7	8	9	10	Final
Matt Dunstone	0	0	2	1	0	2	0	0	0	3	8
Reid Carruthers 🔨	1	1	0	0	2	0	0	2	1	0	7

2023 Viterra Championship

Matt Dunstone
1st Manitoba Provincial Championship title
