= 2022 Viterra Championship =

- Host city: Selkirk, Manitoba
- Arena: Selkirk Curling Club
- Dates: February 9–13
- Winner: Team McEwen
- Curling club: West St. Paul CC, West St. Paul
- Skip: Mike McEwen
- Third: Reid Carruthers
- Second: Derek Samagalski
- Lead: Colin Hodgson
- Finalist: Colton Lott

The 2022 Viterra Championship, Manitoba's provincial men's curling championship, was held from February 9 to 13 at the Selkirk Curling Club in Selkirk. The winning Mike McEwen represented Manitoba at the 2022 Tim Hortons Brier.

The event was originally supposed to begin on January 25, but was postponed due to the COVID-19 pandemic in Manitoba. Its new dates in February were later green lit by provincial health officials, in January 2022, and will not be cancelled as the 2021 edition had been due to the COVID-19 pandemic in Manitoba. The event was also originally going to be played at the Selkirk Recreation Complex, but was moved to the Selkirk Curling Club. The event only had 28 teams instead of the regular 32, as the last four qualifying spots could not be filled due to event cancellations due to the pandemic.

== Teams ==
The teams are listed as follows:

Skip	Third	Second	Lead	Alternate	Club
Sam Antila	Rylan Young	Jeff Antila	Ian Graham	Alex Sutherland	Burntwood Curling Club
Daniel Birchard	Kelly Fordyce	Brody Moore	Andrew Peck	Jim Coleman	Pembina Curling Club
Braden Calvert	Kyle Kurz	Ian McMillan	Rob Gordon		Assiniboine Memorial Curling Club
Corey Chambers	Julien Leduc	Devon Wiebe	Stu Shiells	Steve Irwin	Fort Garry Curling Club
Graham Freeman	Brooks Freeman	Jace Freeman	Dwayne Barkley	Kevin Barkley	Virden Curling Club
Jacques Gauthier	Jordan Peters	Brayden Payette	Cole Chandler		Assiniboine Memorial Curling Club
Sean Grassie	Tyler Drews	Daryl Evans	Rodney Legault		Deer Lodge Curling Club
Jason Gunnlaugson	Adam Casey	Matt Wozniak	Connor Njegovan	Alex Forrest	Morris Curling Club
Jack Hykaway	Joshua Harding	Graham Normand	Richard Hawkins		Pembina Curling Club
Colton Lott	Tanner Lott	Kyle Doering	Emerson Klimpke	Kody Janzen	Winnipeg Beach Curling Club
Mark Lukowich	Sheldon Oshanyk	Chris Chimuk	Stu Gresham	Jeff Tarko	Fort Rouge Curling Club
William Lyburn	Scott McDonald	Kennedy Bird	Wade Ford	Bryce McEwen	Granite Curling Club
Kelly Marnoch	Bart Witherspoon	Branden Jorgensen	Dean Smith	Justin Reischek	Carberry Curling Club
Evan Martin	Travis Bale	Ian Fordyce	Nigel Milnes	Jon Ray	Fort Rouge Curling Club
Kyle McCannell	Thomas Titchkosky	Rhilynd Peters	Jeff MacMillan	Curtis McCannell	Pilot Mound Curling Club
Jordon McDonald	Zach Wasylyk	Reese Hamm	Alexandre Fontaine	Elias Huminicki	Deer Lodge Curling Club
Mike McEwen	Reid Carruthers	Derek Samagalski	Colin Hodgson		West St. Paul Curling Club
Richard Muntain	Darren Oryniak	Al Purdy	A. J. Girardin		Granite Curling Club
Randy Neufeld	Dean Moxham	Peter Nicholls	Dale Fust	Dean Clayton	La Salle Curling Club
Dean North	Kyle MacNair	Wayne Nussey	Mike Hutton	Darcy Hayward	Carman Curling Club
Justin Richter	Kyle Einarson	Jared Litke	Mitch Einarson		Beausejour Curling Club
JT Ryan	Colin Kurz	Brendan Bilawka	Tyler Forrest	Austin Pearson	Assiniboine Memorial Curling Club
Grant Shewfelt	Mike Johnson	Rob Van Deynze	Mike Orchard	Brad Wainikka	Baldur Curling Club
Riley Smith	Nick Curtis	Jared Hancox	Justin Tiwss	Josh Claeys	Assiniboine Memorial Curling Club
Jeff Stewart	Eric Zamrykut	Austin Mustard	Geoff Trimble		Gladstone Curling Club
Ryan Thomson	Marcus Titchkosky	Mark Georges	Evan Gillis	Gord Titchkosky	Morden Curling Club
Brett Walter	Graham McFarlane	Hugh McFarlane	Jake Zelenewich	Thomas Dunlop	Assiniboine Memorial Curling Club
Ryan Wiebe	Ty Dilello	Sean Flatt	Adam Flatt	Derek Oryniak	Fort Rouge Curling Club

== Knockout brackets ==
28 team double knockout with playoff round
Four teams qualify each from A Event and B Event

=== A event ===
First Knockout	Qualifier 1
Jason Gunnlaugson	9
Grant Shewfelt	1
Randy Neufeld	6
Grant Shewfelt	9
Jason Gunnlaugson	4
Ryan Wiebe	5
Ryan Wiebe	9
Jack Hykaway	3
Ryan Wiebe	5
JT Ryan	4
Evan Martin	2
JT Ryan	6

First Knockout	Qualifier 2
Colton Lott	7
Daniel Birchard	3
Daniel Birchard	8
Dean North	3
Colton Lott	7
Riley Smith	5
Riley Smith	8
Ryan Thomson	3
Riley Smith	7
William Lyburn	6
Kelly Marnoch	5
William Lyburn	6

First Knockout	Qualifier 3
Braden Calvert	6
Brett Walter	5
Jeff Stewart	6
Brett Walter	7
Braden Calvert	7
Jordon McDonald	1
Mark Lukowich	3
Corey Chambers	8
Corey Chambers	6
Jordon McDonald	11
Jordon McDonald	7
Graham Freeman	5

First Knockout	Qualifier 4
Mike McEwen	7
Richard Muntain	2
Sam Anitla	4
Richard Muntain	10
Mike McEwen	4
Jacques Gauthier	2
Jacques Gauthier	8
Kyle McCannell	3
Jacques Gauthier	7
Sean Grassie	3
Sean Grassie	7
Justin Richter	4

=== B event ===
Second Knockout	Qualifier 5
Randy Neufeld	1
JT Ryan	8	Jason Gunnlaugson	8
JT Ryan	9	JT Ryan	4
Jack Hykaway	4
Grant Shewfelt	4
Evan Martin	4	Jack Hykaway	7
Jack Hykaway	7

Second Knockout	Qualifier 6
Dean North	7
William Lyburn	9	Riley Smith	6
William Lyburn	8	William Lyburn	7
Daniel Birchard	5
Daniel Birchard	10
Ryan Thomson	9	Ryan Thomson	9
Kelly Marnoch	2

Second Knockout	Qualifier 7
Jeff Stewart	3
Corey Chambers	9	Jordon McDonald	3
Corey Chambers	7	Corey Chambers	6
Brett Walter	6
Brett Walter	8
Graham Freeman	11	Graham Freeman	1
Mark Lukowich	4

Second Knockout	Qualifier 8
Sam Anitla	2
Sean Grassie	8	Jacques Gauthier	7
Sean Grassie	4	Justin Richter	2
Justin Richter	10
Richard Muntain	2
Justin Richter	9	Justin Richter	11
Kyle McCannell	6

== Knockout results ==
All draw times listed in Central Time (UTC−06:00).

=== Draw 1 ===
Wednesday, February 9, 8:30 am

Sheet A	1	2	3	4	5	6	7	8	9	10	Final
Randy Neufeld 🔨	0	2	0	0	1	1	0	1	1	0	6
Grant Shewfelt	1	0	2	2	0	0	1	0	0	3	9

Sheet B	1	2	3	4	5	6	7	8	9	10	Final
Evan Martin	0	0	0	1	0	0	1	0	X	X	2
JT Ryan 🔨	1	0	2	0	0	3	0	0	X	X	6

Sheet C	1	2	3	4	5	6	7	8	9	10	Final
Ryan Wiebe	1	4	2	0	0	1	0	0	1	X	9
Jack Hykaway 🔨	0	0	0	1	1	0	0	1	0	X	3

Sheet D	1	2	3	4	5	6	7	8	9	10	Final
Daniel Birchard 🔨	0	2	0	1	0	2	1	2	X	X	8
Dean North	0	0	1	0	2	0	0	0	X	X	3

=== Draw 2 ===
Wednesday, February 9, 12:15 pm

Sheet A	1	2	3	4	5	6	7	8	9	10	Final
Mark Lukowich	0	1	0	1	0	0	1	X	X	X	3
Corey Chambers 🔨	3	0	2	0	1	2	0	X	X	X	8

Sheet B	1	2	3	4	5	6	7	8	9	10	Final
Jeff Stewart 🔨	0	0	1	0	0	2	0	2	0	1	6
Brett Walter	0	2	0	1	1	0	1	0	2	0	7

Sheet C	1	2	3	4	5	6	7	8	9	10	Final
Kelly Marnoch	0	1	0	1	0	1	0	0	2	0	5
William Lyburn 🔨	1	0	2	0	1	0	0	1	0	1	6

Sheet D	1	2	3	4	5	6	7	8	9	10	Final
Riley Smith 🔨	2	0	1	0	0	1	1	0	3	X	8
Ryan Thomson	0	1	0	2	0	0	0	0	0	X	3

=== Draw 3 ===
Wednesday, February 9, 4:00 pm

Sheet A	1	2	3	4	5	6	7	8	9	10	Final
Jacques Gauthier	0	0	0	1	0	3	0	1	1	2	8
Kyle McCannell 🔨	0	1	0	0	2	0	0	0	0	0	3

Sheet B	1	2	3	4	5	6	7	8	9	10	Final
Jordon McDonald 🔨	2	0	2	0	1	1	0	0	0	1	7
Graham Freeman	0	0	0	1	0	0	2	0	2	0	5

Sheet C	1	2	3	4	5	6	7	8	9	10	Final
Sean Grassie	0	2	0	1	0	2	1	0	1	X	7
Justin Richter 🔨	1	0	1	0	1	0	0	1	0	X	4

Sheet D	1	2	3	4	5	6	7	8	9	10	Final
Sam Anitla 🔨	0	0	0	0	0	2	2	0	X	X	4
Richard Muntain	1	6	0	1	1	0	0	1	X	X	10

=== Draw 4 ===
Wednesday, February 9, 8:15 pm

Sheet A	1	2	3	4	5	6	7	8	9	10	11	Final
Brett Walter 🔨	0	0	0	1	1	0	0	1	0	2	0	5
Braden Calvert	0	0	1	0	0	1	1	0	2	0	1	6

Sheet B	1	2	3	4	5	6	7	8	9	10	Final
Grant Shewfelt	0	1	0	0	0	0	X	X	X	X	1
Jason Gunnlaugson 🔨	1	0	4	0	1	3	X	X	X	X	9

Sheet C	1	2	3	4	5	6	7	8	9	10	Final
Daniel Birchard	0	0	1	0	0	0	0	2	0	X	3
Colton Lott 🔨	0	1	0	2	1	2	0	0	1	X	7

Sheet D	1	2	3	4	5	6	7	8	9	10	Final
Evan Martin	0	0	1	0	1	0	1	1	0	0	4
Jack Hykaway 🔨	2	1	0	2	0	0	0	0	1	1	7

=== Draw 5 ===
Thursday, February 10, 8:30 am

Sheet A	1	2	3	4	5	6	7	8	9	10	Final
Richard Muntain	0	0	0	0	0	2	0	0	X	X	2
Mike McEwen 🔨	0	0	2	1	1	0	2	1	X	X	7

Sheet B	1	2	3	4	5	6	7	8	9	10	Final
Ryan Thomson 🔨	2	1	0	2	0	4	X	X	X	X	9
Kelly Marnoch	0	0	1	0	1	0	X	X	X	X	2

Sheet C	1	2	3	4	5	6	7	8	9	10	Final
Graham Freeman 🔨	2	0	1	1	0	0	2	5	X	X	11
Mark Lukowich	0	1	0	0	2	1	0	0	X	X	4

Sheet D	1	2	3	4	5	6	7	8	9	10	Final
Justin Richter	0	3	0	0	2	0	0	4	0	0	9
Kyle McCannell 🔨	1	0	0	2	0	1	1	0	1	0	6

=== Draw 6 ===
Thursday, February 10, 12:15 pm

Sheet A	1	2	3	4	5	6	7	8	9	10	Final
Ryan Wiebe 🔨	1	1	0	0	0	1	0	1	0	1	5
JT Ryan	0	0	0	1	1	0	1	0	1	0	4

Sheet B	1	2	3	4	5	6	7	8	9	10	11	Final
Riley Smith 🔨	0	1	0	0	1	2	0	0	0	2	1	7
William Lyburn	0	0	0	4	0	0	0	2	0	0	0	6

Sheet C	1	2	3	4	5	6	7	8	9	10	Final
Corey Chambers	0	1	0	1	0	2	0	2	0	X	6
Jordon McDonald 🔨	2	0	4	0	1	0	1	0	3	X	11

Sheet D	1	2	3	4	5	6	7	8	9	10	Final
Jacques Gauthier 🔨	0	3	0	0	1	0	3	0	X	X	7
Sean Grassie	0	0	1	0	0	1	0	1	X	X	3

=== Draw 7 ===
Thursday, February 10, 4:00 pm

Sheet A	1	2	3	4	5	6	7	8	9	10	Final
Jack Hykaway 🔨	1	0	1	0	2	0	0	0	2	1	7
Grant Shewfelt	0	1	0	2	0	1	0	0	0	0	4

Sheet B	1	2	3	4	5	6	7	8	9	10	Final
Graham Freeman	0	0	0	0	0	1	X	X	X	X	1
Brett Walter 🔨	0	3	2	0	3	0	X	X	X	X	8

Sheet C	1	2	3	4	5	6	7	8	9	10	Final
Justin Richter 🔨	1	1	3	0	1	2	0	3	X	X	11
Richard Muntain	0	0	0	1	0	0	1	0	X	X	2

Sheet D	1	2	3	4	5	6	7	8	9	10	11	12	Final
Ryan Thomson	0	0	0	3	0	2	1	1	0	2	0	0	9
Daniel Birchard 🔨	2	1	2	0	2	0	0	0	2	0	0	1	10

=== Draw 8 ===
Thursday, February 10, 8:15 pm

Sheet A	1	2	3	4	5	6	7	8	9	10	Final
Sam Anitla	0	0	0	0	0	1	1	0	X	X	2
Sean Grassie 🔨	1	2	2	1	1	0	0	1	X	X	8

Sheet B	1	2	3	4	5	6	7	8	9	10	Final
Randy Neufeld 🔨	0	0	0	0	1	0	0	X	X	X	1
JT Ryan	0	2	1	1	0	3	1	X	X	X	8

Sheet C	1	2	3	4	5	6	7	8	9	10	Final
Dean North 🔨	2	2	2	0	0	0	0	1	0	0	7
William Lyburn	0	0	0	1	2	1	2	0	1	2	9

Sheet D	1	2	3	4	5	6	7	8	9	10	Final
Jeff Stewart	0	0	0	2	0	0	1	0	0	X	3
Corey Chambers 🔨	2	0	1	0	1	2	0	0	3	X	9

=== Draw 9 ===
Friday, February 11, 8:30 am

Sheet A	1	2	3	4	5	6	7	8	9	10	Final
Colton Lott 🔨	0	2	0	0	2	0	0	2	0	1	7
Riley Smith	0	0	2	0	0	1	0	0	2	0	5

Sheet B	1	2	3	4	5	6	7	8	9	10	Final
Mike McEwen 🔨	0	0	0	0	0	1	0	2	0	1	4
Jacques Gauthier	0	0	0	0	0	0	1	0	1	0	2

Sheet C	1	2	3	4	5	6	7	8	9	10	Final
Jason Gunnlaugson 🔨	2	0	0	0	0	1	0	0	1	0	4
Ryan Wiebe	0	0	2	0	0	0	1	1	0	1	5

Sheet D	1	2	3	4	5	6	7	8	9	10	Final
Braden Calvert 🔨	0	2	0	2	3	0	0	0	X	X	7
Jordon McDonald	0	0	0	0	0	1	0	0	X	X	1

=== Draw 10 ===
Friday, February 11, 12:15 pm

Sheet A	1	2	3	4	5	6	7	8	9	10	Final
Corey Chambers 🔨	0	1	0	2	0	2	0	1	0	1	7
Brett Walter	0	0	2	0	1	0	2	0	1	0	6

Sheet B	1	2	3	4	5	6	7	8	9	10	Final
William Lyburn 🔨	0	3	0	1	0	0	2	1	0	1	8
Daniel Birchard	1	0	0	0	3	0	0	0	1	0	5

Sheet C	1	2	3	4	5	6	7	8	9	10	Final
JT Ryan	0	3	1	0	1	3	0	1	X	X	9
Jack Hykaway 🔨	1	0	0	2	0	0	1	0	X	X	4

Sheet D	1	2	3	4	5	6	7	8	9	10	Final
Sean Grassie	0	1	0	2	0	1	0	0	X	X	4
Justin Richter 🔨	1	0	1	0	4	0	3	1	X	X	10

=== Draw 11 ===
Friday, February 11, 4:00 pm

Sheet A	1	2	3	4	5	6	7	8	9	10	Final
Justin Richter	0	1	0	0	0	1	0	0	0	X	2
Jacques Gauthier 🔨	0	0	2	1	1	0	2	0	1	X	7

Sheet B	1	2	3	4	5	6	7	8	9	10	Final
Corey Chambers	0	0	1	1	1	0	1	2	0	X	6
Jordon McDonald 🔨	0	1	0	0	0	1	0	0	1	X	3

Sheet C	1	2	3	4	5	6	7	8	9	10	Final
William Lyburn	0	1	0	1	0	2	0	0	0	3	7
Riley Smith 🔨	0	0	2	0	3	0	0	0	1	0	6

Sheet D	1	2	3	4	5	6	7	8	9	10	Final
JT Ryan	0	0	1	0	0	2	0	1	0	X	4
Jason Gunnlaugson 🔨	0	2	0	1	2	0	1	0	2	X	8

== Playoff Bracket ==
8 team double knockout
Four teams qualify into Championship Round

=== A bracket ===
First Knockout
Q1	Ryan Wiebe	6
Q6	William Lyburn	7
Q2	Colton Lott	8
Q5	Jason Gunnlaugson	3

Qualifier 1
Q6	William Lyburn	3
Q2	Colton Lott	9

First Knockout
Q3	Braden Calvert	9
Q8	Jacques Gauthier	8
Q4	Mike McEwen	4
Q7	Corey Chambers	3

Qualifier 2
Q3	Braden Calvert	6
Q4	Mike McEwen	7

=== B bracket ===
Second Knockout			Qualifier 3
			Q3	Braden Calvert	5
Q1	Ryan Wiebe	7	Q1	Ryan Wiebe	6
Q5	Jason Gunnlaugson	4

Second Knockout			Qualifier 4
			Q6	William Lyburn	2
Q8	Jacques Gauthier	4	Q7	Corey Chambers	7
Q7	Corey Chambers	5

== Playoff Round Results ==
=== Draw 12 ===
Friday, February 11, 7:45 pm

Sheet A	1	2	3	4	5	6	7	8	9	10	Final
Ryan Wiebe 🔨	0	0	2	1	0	2	0	1	0	0	6
William Lyburn	1	1	0	0	1	0	0	0	2	2	7

Sheet B	1	2	3	4	5	6	7	8	9	10	Final
Braden Calvert 🔨	2	0	2	0	2	0	2	0	1	X	9
Jacques Gauthier	0	3	0	2	0	0	0	0	0	X	5

Sheet C	1	2	3	4	5	6	7	8	9	10	Final
Colton Lott 🔨	2	2	0	1	0	0	3	X	X	X	8
Jason Gunnlaugson	0	0	2	0	1	0	0	X	X	X	3

Sheet D	1	2	3	4	5	6	7	8	9	10	11	Final
Mike McEwen 🔨	0	1	0	0	0	1	0	0	0	1	1	4
Corey Chambers	0	0	0	1	0	0	1	0	1	0	0	3

=== Draw 13 ===
Saturday, February 12, 9:00 am

Sheet A	1	2	3	4	5	6	7	8	9	10	Final
Braden Calvert 🔨	1	0	0	1	0	3	0	1	0	0	6
Mike McEwen	0	0	1	0	2	0	0	0	3	1	7

Sheet B	1	2	3	4	5	6	7	8	9	10	Final
William Lyburn	0	0	1	0	0	2	0	X	X	X	3
Colton Lott 🔨	2	1	0	1	2	0	3	X	X	X	9

Sheet C	1	2	3	4	5	6	7	8	9	10	11	Final
Jacques Gauthier	0	0	0	0	2	0	0	1	0	1	0	4
Corey Chambers 🔨	0	2	1	0	0	0	0	0	1	0	1	5

Sheet D	1	2	3	4	5	6	7	8	9	10	Final
Ryan Wiebe 🔨	0	1	1	1	1	0	0	3	0	X	7
Jason Gunnlaugson	0	0	0	0	0	2	1	0	1	X	4

=== Draw 14 ===
Saturday, February 12, 2:00 pm

Sheet C	1	2	3	4	5	6	7	8	9	10	Final
Braden Calvert	1	0	1	0	0	0	1	0	2	0	5
Ryan Wiebe 🔨	0	1	0	1	0	2	0	1	0	1	6

Sheet D	1	2	3	4	5	6	7	8	9	10	Final
William Lyburn	0	0	0	1	0	0	1	0	0	X	2
Corey Chambers 🔨	1	1	1	0	1	1	0	1	1	X	7

== Championship Round ==
Page playoff system
1	Colton Lott	8
2	Mike McEwen	7
3	Ryan Wiebe	7
4	Corey Chambers	4

Semifinal
2	Mike McEwen	10
3	Ryan Wiebe	9

Final
1	Colton Lott	3
2	Mike McEwen	8

=== 1 vs. 2 ===
Saturday, February 12, 6:00 pm

Sheet C	1	2	3	4	5	6	7	8	9	10	Final
Colton Lott	0	0	2	0	2	0	2	0	0	2	8
Mike McEwen 🔨	0	2	0	2	0	1	0	2	0	0	7

=== 3 vs. 4 ===
Saturday, February 12, 6:00 pm

Sheet B	1	2	3	4	5	6	7	8	9	10	Final
Ryan Wiebe 🔨	2	1	2	0	1	0	0	0	1	X	7
Corey Chambers	0	0	0	3	0	0	0	1	0	X	4

=== Semifinal ===
Sunday, February 13, 9:00 am

Sheet C	1	2	3	4	5	6	7	8	9	10	Final
Mike McEwen 🔨	0	5	0	1	1	1	0	1	0	1	10
Ryan Wiebe	2	0	3	0	0	0	2	0	2	0	9

=== Final ===
Sunday, February 13, 2:30 pm

Sheet C	1	2	3	4	5	6	7	8	9	10	Final
Colton Lott 🔨	2	0	1	0	0	0	0	0	X	X	3
Mike McEwen	0	2	0	0	0	3	1	2	X	X	8

2022 Viterra Championship

Mike McEwen
4th Manitoba Provincial Championship title
