= 2020 Viterra Championship =

- Host city: Winnipeg, Manitoba
- Arena: Eric Coy Arena
- Dates: February 5–9
- Winner: Team Gunnlaugson
- Curling club: Morris CC, Morris
- Skip: Jason Gunnlaugson
- Third: Alex Forrest
- Second: Adam Casey
- Lead: Connor Njegovan
- Finalist: Mike McEwen

The 2020 Viterra Championship, Manitoba's provincial men's curling championship, was held from February 5 to 9 at the Eric Coy Arena in Winnipeg. The winning Jason Gunnlaugson rink represented Manitoba at the 2020 Tim Hortons Brier and finished with a 5–6 record.

Jason Gunnlaugson won his first Viterra Championship by defeating Mike McEwen 7–4 in the final.

== Teams ==
Teams are as follows:

Skip	Third	Second	Lead	Alternate	Club
Ray Baker	Jason Yates	Rob Fisher	Terry Gudmundson		Dauphin Curling Club
Dennis Bohn	Neil Kitching	Kody Janzen	Daniel Hunt		Assiniboine Memorial Curling Club
Braden Calvert	Kyle Kurz	Ian McMillan	Rob Gordon	Justin Richter	Assiniboine Memorial Curling Club
Corey Chambers	Julien Leduc	Devon Wiebe	Stuart Shiells		Thistle Curling Club
Cale Dunbar	Shayne MacGranachan	Cody Chatham	Kyle Sambrook	Chris Campbell	Brandon Curling Club
Graham Freeman	Brooks Freeman	Cory Barkley	Dwayne Barkley	Kevin Barkley	Virden Curling Club
Josh Friesen	Emerson Klimpke	Troy Kemball	Reece Hamm	Josh Maisey	Stonewall Curling Club
Jacques Gauthier	Jordan Peters	Brayden Payette	Zack Bilawka		Assiniboine Memorial Curling Club
Allan Gitzel	Kris Mazinke	Rheal Vermette	Duane Gitzel	Rheal Bedard	Morris Curling Club
Sean Grassie	Tyler Drews	Daryl Evans	Rodney Legault		Deer Lodge Curling Club
Jason Gunnlaugson	Alex Forrest	Adam Casey	Connor Njegovan		Morris Curling Club
Tanner Horgan	Colton Lott	Kyle Doering	Tanner Lott		Winnipeg Beach Curling Club
Steve Irwin	Travis Taylor	Travis Brooks	Travis Saban		Brandon Curling Club
Gerry Janz	Jesse Janz	Darrick Jones	Drew Janz	Grant Shewfelt	Baldur Curling Club
Jay Kinnaird	Cory Zdan	Chris Mannle	Tyler Strachan	Kris Kinnaird	Virden Curling Club
Trevor Loreth	Brad Haight	Ryan Lowdon	Brett Cawson	Stu Gresham	Granite Curling Club
Mark Lukowich	Sheldon Oshanyk	Chris Chimuk	Kevin Wiebe	Rob Atkins	Granite Curling Club
William Lyburn	Daley Peters	Kennedy Bird	Wade Ford		Granite Curling Club
Kelly Marnoch	Bart Witherspoon	Branden Jorgensen	Scott Crayston	Rob Van Kommer	Carberry Curling Club
Mike McEwen	Reid Carruthers	Derek Samagalski	Colin Hodgson		West St. Paul Curling Club
Randy Neufeld	Dean Moxham	Peter Nicholls	Dale Michie	Brett Moxham	La Salle Curling Club
Dean North	Darcy Hayward	Wayne Nussey	Mike Hutton	Warren McCutcheon	Carman Curling Club
Shaun Parsons	Kevin Parsons	Bronston Jonasson	Jim Davidson		Burntwood Curling Club
Darren Perche	Jason Perche	Shane Perche	Bryce Perche	Clint Stuart	Charleswood Curling Club
JT Ryan	Colin Kurz	Brendan Bilawka	Cole Chandler		Assiniboine Memorial Curling Club
Paul Scinocca	Ed Barr	Tim Loeb	Justin Hartloper	Dan Lagace	St. Vital Curling Club
Steen Sigurdson	Justin Reynolds	Nick Weshnoweski	Justin Hoplock	Joe Eade	Gimli Curling Club
Jordan Smith	Bryce McEwen	Devin McArthur	Lucas Van Den Bosch		Deer Lodge Curling Club
Jeff Stewart	Dean Smith	Austin Mustard	Jeff Steen	Eric Zamrykut	Gladstone Curling Club
Ryan Thomson	Kyle Peters	Mark Georges	Evan Gillis		Morden Curling Club
Brett Walter	Thomas Dunlop	Zachary Wasylik	Frank Walter	Lawson Yates	Assiniboine Memorial Curling Club
Ryan Wiebe	Carter Watkins	Sean Flatt	Adam Flatt	Brett MacDonald	St. Vital Curling Club

== Knockout brackets ==
32 team double knockout with playoff round
Four teams qualify each from A Event and B Event

=== A event ===
First Knockout	Qualifier 1
Brett Walter	8
Randy Neufeld	6
Brett Walter	6
Jason Gunnlaugson	7
Jason Gunnlaugson	10
Darren Perche	5
Jason Gunnlaugson	2
Ryan Wiebe	8
Ray Baker	3
JT Ryan	11
JT Ryan	5
Ryan Wiebe	9
Ryan Wiebe	7
Steen Sigurdson	4

First Knockout	Qualifier 2
Jeff Stewart	5
Steve Irwin	6
Steve Irwin	5
Corey Chambers	6
Corey Chambers	9
Gerry Janz	4
Corey Chambers	3
Tanner Horgan	7
Shaun Parsons	3
Tanner Horgan	10
Tanner Horgan	9
Kelly Marnoch	1
Kelly Marnoch	9
Mark Lukowich	3

First Knockout	Qualifier 3
Josh Friesen	4
Trevor Loreth	9
Trevor Loreth	1
Braden Calvert	8
Braden Calvert	11
Allan Gitzel	1
Braden Calvert	4
William Lyburn	7
Jay Kinnaird	4
William Lyburn	8
William Lyburn	8
Jacques Gauthier	7
Jacques Gauthier	7
Ryan Thomson	3

First Knockout	Qualifier 4
Graham Freeman	7
Jordan Smith	11
Jordan Smith	2
Mike McEwen	8
Mike McEwen	11
Paul Scinocca	2
Mike McEwen	6
Sean Grassie	1
Dean North	3
Sean Grassie	7
Sean Grassie	6
Dennis Bohn	5
Dennis Bohn	12
Cale Dunbar	3

=== B event ===
Second Knockout	Qualifier 5
JT Ryan	9
Randy Neufeld	6	Darren Perche	5	Jason Gunnlaugson	9
Darren Perche	7	JT Ryan	7	JT Ryan	5
Brett Walter	4
Brett Walter	8
Ray Baker	10	Ray Baker	4
Steen Sigurdson	6

Second Knockout	Qualifier 6
Kelly Marnoch	7
Jeff Stewart	7	Jeff Stewart	5	Corey Chambers	4
Gerry Janz	1	Kelly Marnoch	3	Steve Irwin	7
Steve Irwin	5
Steve Irwin	4
Shaun Parsons	4	Mark Lukowich	3
Mark Lukowich	5

Second Knockout	Qualifier 7
Jacques Gauthier	8
Josh Friesen	4	Josh Friesen	3	Braden Calvert	4
Allan Gitzel	3	Jacques Gauthier	5	Jacques Gauthier	5
Trevor Loreth	4
Trevor Loreth	7
Jay Kinnaird	3	Ryan Thomson	6
Ryan Thomson	9

Second Knockout	Qualifier 8
Dennis Bohn	9
Graham Freeman	7	Graham Freeman	7	Sean Grassie	9
Paul Scinocca	3	Dennis Bohn	6	Dennis Bohn	7
Jordan Smith	4
Jordan Smith	11
Dean North	1	Cale Dunbar	3
Cale Dunbar	10

== Knockout results ==
All draws are listed in Central Time (UTC−06:00).

=== Draw 1 ===
Wednesday, February 5, 8:30 am

Sheet A	1	2	3	4	5	6	7	8	9	10	Final
Brett Walter 🔨	1	0	0	0	0	2	4	0	0	1	8
Randy Neufeld	0	2	0	2	1	0	0	1	0	0	6

Sheet B	1	2	3	4	5	6	7	8	9	10	Final
Jason Gunnlaugson 🔨	3	0	3	2	0	0	1	1	X	X	10
Darren Perche	0	1	0	0	3	1	0	0	X	X	5

Sheet C	1	2	3	4	5	6	7	8	9	10	Final
Ray Baker 🔨	1	0	1	0	1	0	0	0	X	X	3
JT Ryan	0	3	0	4	0	0	1	3	X	X	11

Sheet D	1	2	3	4	5	6	7	8	9	10	Final
Ryan Wiebe 🔨	0	0	2	0	0	0	1	0	2	2	7
Steen Sigurdson	0	1	0	1	0	1	0	1	0	0	4

Sheet E	1	2	3	4	5	6	7	8	9	10	Final
Jeff Stewart 🔨	2	0	0	1	0	0	1	0	0	1	5
Steve Irwin	0	1	1	0	1	1	0	1	1	0	6

=== Draw 2 ===
Wednesday, February 5, 12:15 pm

Sheet A	1	2	3	4	5	6	7	8	9	10	Final
Braden Calvert 🔨	0	1	4	2	0	3	1	X	X	X	11
Allan Gitzel	0	0	0	0	1	0	0	X	X	X	1

Sheet B	1	2	3	4	5	6	7	8	9	10	Final
Josh Friesen	0	1	0	0	0	1	0	2	0	X	4
Trevor Loreth 🔨	1	0	3	0	2	0	1	0	2	X	9

Sheet C	1	2	3	4	5	6	7	8	9	10	Final
Kelly Marnoch 🔨	0	0	2	0	0	2	2	0	3	X	9
Mark Lukowich	1	0	0	0	2	0	0	0	0	X	3

Sheet D	1	2	3	4	5	6	7	8	9	10	Final
Shaun Parsons	0	1	0	2	0	0	0	X	X	X	3
Tanner Horgan 🔨	4	0	3	0	0	0	3	X	X	X	10

Sheet E	1	2	3	4	5	6	7	8	9	10	Final
Corey Chambers 🔨	2	0	1	0	0	2	0	2	2	X	9
Gerry Janz	0	1	0	0	2	0	1	0	0	X	4

=== Draw 3 ===
Wednesday, February 5, 4:00 pm

Sheet A	1	2	3	4	5	6	7	8	9	10	Final
Dean North 🔨	1	0	0	0	1	0	0	1	0	X	3
Sean Grassie	0	1	3	0	0	0	1	0	2	X	7

Sheet B	1	2	3	4	5	6	7	8	9	10	Final
Jacques Gauthier 🔨	0	0	2	0	2	0	2	1	0	X	7
Ryan Thomson	0	0	0	1	0	2	0	0	0	X	3

Sheet C	1	2	3	4	5	6	7	8	9	10	Final
Graham Freeman	0	2	0	1	3	0	0	0	1	X	7
Jordan Smith 🔨	3	0	2	0	0	1	2	3	0	X	11

Sheet D	1	2	3	4	5	6	7	8	9	10	Final
Mike McEwen 🔨	2	1	1	0	2	0	2	3	X	X	11
Paul Scinocca	0	0	0	1	0	1	0	0	X	X	2

Sheet E	1	2	3	4	5	6	7	8	9	10	Final
Jay Kinnaird	0	0	1	0	1	0	0	2	X	X	4
William Lyburn 🔨	3	0	0	2	0	0	3	0	X	X	8

=== Draw 4 ===
Wednesday, February 5, 8:15 pm

Sheet A	1	2	3	4	5	6	7	8	9	10	Final
Ray Baker 🔨	1	0	1	3	0	2	0	3	X	X	10
Steen Sigurdson	0	2	0	0	2	0	2	0	X	X	6

Sheet B	1	2	3	4	5	6	7	8	9	10	Final
Shaun Parsons	0	1	1	0	1	0	0	0	1	0	4
Mark Lukowich 🔨	1	0	0	1	0	1	1	0	0	1	5

Sheet C	1	2	3	4	5	6	7	8	9	10	Final
Randy Neufeld 🔨	0	0	1	2	0	0	2	0	1	0	6
Darren Perche	1	0	0	0	1	2	0	2	0	1	7

Sheet D	1	2	3	4	5	6	7	8	9	10	Final
Jeff Stewart 🔨	0	0	1	2	1	0	0	3	X	X	7
Gerry Janz	0	0	0	0	0	0	1	0	X	X	1

Sheet E	1	2	3	4	5	6	7	8	9	10	Final
Dennis Bohn 🔨	2	1	0	2	0	1	6	X	X	X	12
Cale Dunbar	0	0	3	0	0	0	0	X	X	X	3

=== Draw 5 ===
Thursday, February 6, 8:30 am

Sheet A	1	2	3	4	5	6	7	8	9	10	Final
Jay Kinnaird	0	1	0	1	0	1	X	X	X	X	3
Ryan Thomson 🔨	3	0	4	0	2	0	X	X	X	X	9

Sheet B	1	2	3	4	5	6	7	8	9	10	Final
Tanner Horgan 🔨	2	3	0	0	4	X	X	X	X	X	9
Kelly Marnoch	0	0	0	1	0	X	X	X	X	X	1

Sheet C	1	2	3	4	5	6	7	8	9	10	11	Final
William Lyburn 🔨	1	0	0	3	0	2	0	0	0	1	1	8
Jacques Gauthier	0	0	1	0	3	0	0	3	0	0	0	7

Sheet D	1	2	3	4	5	6	7	8	9	10	Final
Josh Friesen	1	0	0	0	2	0	0	0	0	1	4
Allan Gitzel 🔨	0	0	0	1	0	0	0	1	1	0	3

Sheet E	1	2	3	4	5	6	7	8	9	10	Final
Trevor Loreth	0	0	0	1	0	0	X	X	X	X	1
Braden Calvert 🔨	0	2	1	0	4	1	X	X	X	X	8

=== Draw 6 ===
Thursday, February 6, 12:15 pm

Sheet A	1	2	3	4	5	6	7	8	9	10	Final
JT Ryan 🔨	1	1	0	1	0	0	0	2	0	X	5
Ryan Wiebe	0	0	2	0	1	2	1	0	3	X	9

Sheet B	1	2	3	4	5	6	7	8	9	10	Final
Steve Irwin	0	0	0	1	0	1	1	1	0	1	5
Corey Chambers 🔨	1	0	1	0	1	0	0	0	3	0	6

Sheet C	1	2	3	4	5	6	7	8	9	10	Final
Sean Grassie 🔨	0	3	1	0	0	0	2	0	0	0	6
Dennis Bohn	0	0	0	0	0	2	0	1	1	1	5

Sheet D	1	2	3	4	5	6	7	8	9	10	Final
Brett Walter	0	0	2	0	1	0	2	0	1	0	6
Jason Gunnlaugson 🔨	2	1	0	2	0	0	0	1	0	1	7

Sheet E	1	2	3	4	5	6	7	8	9	10	Final
Jordan Smith	0	0	0	0	1	1	X	X	X	X	2
Mike McEwen 🔨	4	1	1	2	0	0	X	X	X	X	8

=== Draw 7 ===
Thursday, February 6, 4:00 pm

Sheet A	1	2	3	4	5	6	7	8	9	10	Final
Graham Freeman 🔨	1	1	0	1	0	0	0	2	2	X	7
Paul Scinocca	0	0	2	0	1	0	0	0	0	X	3

Sheet B	1	2	3	4	5	6	7	8	9	10	11	Final
Ryan Thomson	0	1	2	0	0	0	1	0	0	2	0	6
Trevor Loreth 🔨	2	0	0	1	1	0	0	2	0	0	1	7

Sheet C	1	2	3	4	5	6	7	8	9	10	Final
Jeff Stewart 🔨	0	0	0	2	0	0	1	1	1	X	5
Kelly Marnoch	1	0	1	0	4	1	0	0	0	X	7

Sheet D	1	2	3	4	5	6	7	8	9	10	Final
Dean North	0	0	1	0	0	0	X	X	X	X	1
Cale Dunbar 🔨	2	2	0	2	2	2	X	X	X	X	10

Sheet E	1	2	3	4	5	6	7	8	9	10	Final
Josh Friesen 🔨	1	0	0	0	1	0	1	0	0	X	3
Jacques Gauthier	0	1	1	0	0	4	0	1	1	X	8

=== Draw 8 ===
Thursday, February 6, 7:45 pm

Sheet A	1	2	3	4	5	6	7	8	9	10	Final
Mark Lukowich 🔨	1	0	0	0	0	0	1	1	0	0	3
Steve Irwin	0	0	0	0	1	1	0	0	0	2	4

Sheet B	1	2	3	4	5	6	7	8	9	10	11	Final
Darren Perche	1	0	0	1	1	0	0	1	1	0	0	5
JT Ryan 🔨	0	1	1	0	0	1	0	0	0	2	4	9

Sheet C	1	2	3	4	5	6	7	8	9	10	Final
Cale Dunbar 🔨	1	0	2	0	0	0	X	X	X	X	3
Jordan Smith	0	3	0	3	2	3	X	X	X	X	11

Sheet D	1	2	3	4	5	6	7	8	9	10	Final
Graham Freeman	0	4	0	0	1	1	0	0	1	X	7
Dennis Bohn 🔨	2	0	2	1	0	0	3	1	0	X	9

Sheet E	1	2	3	4	5	6	7	8	9	10	Final
Ray Baker	1	0	1	1	0	1	0	0	X	X	4
Brett Walter 🔨	0	1	0	0	3	0	1	3	X	X	8

=== Draw 9 ===
Friday, February 7, 8:30 am

Sheet A	1	2	3	4	5	6	7	8	9	10	Final
Corey Chambers	0	0	1	0	1	0	0	1	0	X	3
Tanner Horgan 🔨	1	1	0	2	0	1	1	0	1	X	7

Sheet B	1	2	3	4	5	6	7	8	9	10	Final
Mike McEwen 🔨	1	0	0	0	0	0	1	3	1	X	6
Sean Grassie	0	0	0	0	0	1	0	0	0	X	1

Sheet C	1	2	3	4	5	6	7	8	9	10	Final
Jason Gunnlaugson	0	0	0	2	0	0	0	X	X	X	2
Ryan Wiebe 🔨	2	1	1	0	2	0	2	X	X	X	8

Sheet D	1	2	3	4	5	6	7	8	9	10	Final
Braden Calvert 🔨	0	1	0	1	0	0	0	2	0	X	4
William Lyburn	0	0	2	0	1	0	0	0	4	X	7

=== Draw 10 ===
Friday, February 7, 12:15 pm

Sheet B	1	2	3	4	5	6	7	8	9	10	Final
Dennis Bohn 🔨	0	2	0	1	0	2	1	0	0	X	6
Jordan Smith	1	0	2	0	1	0	0	0	0	X	4

Sheet C	1	2	3	4	5	6	7	8	9	10	Final
JT Ryan	0	3	0	0	1	0	2	0	1	X	7
Brett Walter 🔨	1	0	0	1	0	1	0	1	0	X	4

Sheet D	1	2	3	4	5	6	7	8	9	10	Final
Jacques Gauthier 🔨	0	1	0	0	0	3	0	1	0	0	5
Trevor Loreth	0	0	0	1	0	0	1	0	2	0	4

Sheet E	1	2	3	4	5	6	7	8	9	10	Final
Kelly Marnoch	0	0	0	0	0	2	1	0	0	0	3
Steve Irwin 🔨	0	2	0	0	1	0	0	0	0	2	5

=== Draw 11 ===
Friday, February 7, 4:00 pm

Sheet A	1	2	3	4	5	6	7	8	9	10	Final
Dennis Bohn 🔨	2	0	0	0	1	0	2	1	0	1	7
Sean Grassie	0	0	2	2	0	3	0	0	2	0	9

Sheet B	1	2	3	4	5	6	7	8	9	10	Final
Jacques Gauthier	0	1	1	2	0	1	0	0	0	0	5
Braden Calvert 🔨	1	0	0	0	0	0	1	1	1	0	4

Sheet C	1	2	3	4	5	6	7	8	9	10	Final
Steve Irwin	0	0	1	0	0	2	1	0	0	3	7
Corey Chambers 🔨	0	0	0	2	0	0	0	1	1	0	4

Sheet D	1	2	3	4	5	6	7	8	9	10	Final
JT Ryan 🔨	0	0	0	2	0	2	0	1	0	X	5
Jason Gunnlaugson	0	1	1	0	2	0	4	0	1	X	9

== Playoff Bracket ==
8 team double knockout
Four teams qualify into Championship Round

=== A bracket ===
First Knockout
Q1	Ryan Wiebe	8
Q6	Steve Irwin	9
Q2	Tanner Horgan	7
Q5	Jason Gunnlaugson	9

Qualifier 1
Q6	Steve Irwin	5
Q5	Jason Gunnlaugson	8

First Knockout
Q3	William Lyburn	4
Q8	Sean Grassie	5
Q4	Mike McEwen	10
Q7	Jacques Gauthier	7

Qualifier 2
Q8	Sean Grassie	4
Q4	Mike McEwen	8

=== B bracket ===
Second Knockout			Qualifier 3
			Q8	Sean Grassie	8
Q1	Ryan Wiebe	8	Q1	Ryan Wiebe	5
Q2	Tanner Horgan	6

Second Knockout			Qualifier 4
			Q6	Steve Irwin	7
Q3	William Lyburn	9	Q3	William Lyburn	8
Q7	Jacques Gauthier	3

== Playoff Round Results ==
=== Draw 12 ===
Friday, February 7, 7:45 pm

Sheet A	1	2	3	4	5	6	7	8	9	10	11	Final
Ryan Wiebe 🔨	1	0	0	1	0	1	0	2	0	3	0	8
Steve Irwin	0	1	1	0	1	0	4	0	1	0	1	9

Sheet B	1	2	3	4	5	6	7	8	9	10	Final
William Lyburn 🔨	0	1	1	0	0	1	0	1	0	0	4
Sean Grassie	0	0	0	1	0	0	0	0	3	1	5

Sheet C	1	2	3	4	5	6	7	8	9	10	11	Final
Tanner Horgan 🔨	1	1	0	0	3	0	0	1	0	1	0	7
Jason Gunnlaugson	0	0	0	3	0	2	0	0	2	0	2	9

Sheet D	1	2	3	4	5	6	7	8	9	10	Final
Mike McEwen 🔨	2	0	0	2	0	3	0	2	1	X	10
Jacques Gauthier	0	1	3	0	1	0	2	0	0	X	7

=== Draw 13 ===
Saturday, February 8, 9:00 am

Sheet A	1	2	3	4	5	6	7	8	9	10	Final
Sean Grassie	0	1	0	1	0	0	0	2	X	X	4
Mike McEwen 🔨	3	0	1	0	2	2	0	0	X	X	8

Sheet B	1	2	3	4	5	6	7	8	9	10	Final
Steve Irwin	0	2	2	0	0	1	0	0	0	X	5
Jason Gunnlaugson 🔨	2	0	0	1	1	0	2	1	1	X	8

Sheet C	1	2	3	4	5	6	7	8	9	10	Final
William Lyburn	1	2	0	0	2	0	3	1	X	X	9
Jacques Gauthier 🔨	0	0	1	1	0	1	0	0	X	X	3

Sheet D	1	2	3	4	5	6	7	8	9	10	Final
Ryan Wiebe 🔨	1	0	0	0	0	3	2	1	0	1	8
Tanner Horgan	0	1	1	0	1	0	0	0	3	0	6

=== Draw 14 ===
Saturday, February 8, 2:00 pm

Sheet B	1	2	3	4	5	6	7	8	9	10	Final
Sean Grassie 🔨	3	0	1	0	2	0	0	1	1	X	8
Ryan Wiebe	0	1	0	2	0	1	1	0	0	X	5

Sheet D	1	2	3	4	5	6	7	8	9	10	Final
Steve Irwin 🔨	3	0	1	0	0	0	2	0	1	0	7
William Lyburn	0	3	0	0	1	1	0	2	0	1	8

== Championship Round ==
Page playoff system
1	Jason Gunnlaugson	8
2	Mike McEwen	6
3	Sean Grassie	6
4	William Lyburn	5

Semifinal
2	Mike McEwen	7
3	Sean Grassie	3

Final
1	Jason Gunnlaugson	7
2	Mike McEwen	4

=== 1 vs. 2 ===
Saturday, February 8, 6:00 pm

Sheet C	1	2	3	4	5	6	7	8	9	10	Final
Jason Gunnlaugson 🔨	0	2	0	1	1	1	0	2	0	1	8
Mike McEwen	1	0	2	0	0	0	3	0	0	0	6

=== 3 vs. 4 ===
Saturday, February 8, 6:00 pm

Sheet B	1	2	3	4	5	6	7	8	9	10	11	Final
Sean Grassie 🔨	0	0	2	0	1	0	0	0	2	0	1	6
William Lyburn	0	0	0	2	0	0	1	0	0	2	0	5

=== Semifinal ===
Sunday, February 9, 8:30 am

Sheet C	1	2	3	4	5	6	7	8	9	10	Final
Mike McEwen 🔨	0	1	1	0	2	0	1	2	0	X	7
Sean Grassie	0	0	0	2	0	0	0	0	1	X	3

Player percentages
Team McEwen		Team Grassie	
Colin Hodgson	90%	Rodney Legault	76%
Derek Samagalski	93%	Daryl Evans	61%
Reid Carruthers	88%	Tyler Drews	71%
Mike McEwen	86%	Sean Grassie	68%
Total	89%	Total	69%

=== Final ===
Sunday, February 9, 2:30 pm

Sheet C	1	2	3	4	5	6	7	8	9	10	Final
Jason Gunnlaugson 🔨	0	1	2	1	0	0	1	0	2	X	7
Mike McEwen	0	0	0	0	3	0	0	1	0	X	4

Player percentages
Team Gunnlaugson		Team McEwen	
Connor Njegovan	89%	Colin Hodgson	86%
Adam Casey	86%	Derek Samagalski	75%
Alex Forrest	68%	Reid Carruthers	75%
Jason Gunnlaugson	75%	Mike McEwen	64%
Total	79%	Total	75%

2020 Viterra Championship

Jason Gunnlaugson
1st Manitoba Provincial Championship title
