= Ryan Wiebe =

Canadian curler

- Curler
- Born: June 16, 2000 (age 26); Winnipeg, Manitoba

Team
- Curling club: Fort Rouge CC, Winnipeg, MB
- Skip: John Epping
- Third: B. J. Neufeld
- Second: Ryan Wiebe
- Lead: Ian McMillan

Curling career
- Member Association: Manitoba (2015–2024; 2026–present); Ontario (2024–2026)
- Brier: 1 (2025)
- Top CTRS ranking: 9th (2024–25)

Ryan Wiebe (born June 16, 2000) is a Canadian curler from Winnipeg, Manitoba. He currently plays second on Team John Epping.

== Career ==
=== Men's ===
In his junior career, Wiebe never won a provincial U18 or junior championship, therefore never qualifying for a national event. His best finish came in 2020 where his team lost in the semifinal of the Telus Junior Men's Championship to Brett Walter. Despite this, his rink of Carter Watkins and Sean and Adam Flatt found success at the men's level, becoming the first team to qualify for the championship round at the 2020 Viterra Championship. After defeating eventual champion Jason Gunnlaugson 8–2 in the A qualifier, the team finished 1–2 in the double knockout and were eliminated in fifth place. Also during the 2019–20 season, Team Wiebe won the MCT Championships on tour and reached three semifinals at the Mother Club Fall Curling Classic, the Manitoba Curling Tour Classic and the DeKalb Superspiel.

For the 2020–21 season, Zack Bilawka joined Team Wiebe as their new second, replacing Watkins and moving Sean Flatt to third. With most of the season cancelled due to the COVID-19 pandemic, the team began competing together for the 2021–22 season. Due to the pandemic, the qualification process for the 2021 Canadian Olympic Curling Trials had to be modified to qualify enough teams for the championship. In these modifications, Curling Canada created the 2021 Canadian Curling Pre-Trials Direct-Entry Event, an event where eight teams would compete to try to earn one of two spots into the 2021 Canadian Olympic Curling Pre-Trials. Team Wiebe qualified for the Pre-Trials Direct-Entry Event as the sixth seed. There, they finished 1–3 and failed to advance to the playoffs. Bilawka left the team after the event and was replaced by Ty Dilello at third, moving Flatt back to second. This new lineup won the MCT Championships in November 2021 and succeeded in qualifying for the 2022 Viterra Championship. At provincials, Team Wiebe again went undefeated to qualify for the championship round, again beating Gunnlaugson in the qualifying game. They then finished 2–1 in the double knockout, eliminating both Gunnlaugson and Braden Calvert to advance to the final four. They were able to beat Corey Chambers in the 3 vs. 4 game but lost 10–9 to Mike McEwen in the semifinal, ending their run in third place.

With Dilello on the team full-time, Team Wiebe continued their strong play into the 2022–23 season, winning the Mother Club Fall Curling Classic to start the year. The team also made the finals of the Mid-Canada Fasteners Classic and the MCT Championships, losing to Corey Chambers and Steve Irwin respectively. They also qualified for the 2022 Tour Challenge Tier 2 Grand Slam where they lost in the quarterfinals to eventual winner Korey Dropkin. At the 2023 Viterra Championship, the team again went 3–0 in the qualifying round but lost games in the double knockout to both Reid Carruthers and Matt Dunstone, falling short of the playoffs. They ended the season at the Best of the West U30 event where they went undefeated until the final where they lost to Karsten Sturmay. Having risen to eleventh on the CTRS standings, Team Wiebe began the 2023–24 season at the 2023 PointsBet Invitational. There, they beat John Epping 8–5 in their opening game before losing to Brad Gushue in the Elite 8 round. They also again qualified for the 2023 Tour Challenge Tier 2, losing in the quarterfinals to Yusuke Morozumi. At the 2024 Viterra Championship, the team looked poised to make another run at the championship, however, lost back-to-back games in the double knockout to Braden Calvert and Jordon McDonald, eliminating them from contention. Team Wiebe ended the season on a high note with an undefeated run to claim the Best of the West title.

For the 2024–25 season, Wiebe joined the Ontario-based Sam Mooibroek rink at third with second Scott Mitchell and lead Nathan Steele. The team began the season at the 2024 PointsBet Invitational where they lost to Rylan Kleiter 5–2 in the opening round. Elsewhere on tour, the team made it to the semifinals of the 2024 Tour Challenge Tier 2 where they were again taken out by Kleiter. Next, they lost in the final of the Stu Sells 1824 Halifax Classic to Jeong Byeong-jin of Korea. In December 2024, they won the Stu Sells Brantford Nissan Classic, defeating Jonathan Beuk in the final. In the new year, the team entered the 2025 Ontario Tankard as the top ranked team and went undefeated to capture the Ontario provincial title. In the final, they defeated the defending champion Scott Howard 7–4, earning the right to represent Ontario at the 2025 Montana's Brier in Kelowna, British Columbia. At the Brier, the Mooibroek rink would finish the round robin at 4–4, just missing out on the playoffs.

Team Mooibroek would start the 2025–26 curling season off strong, winning the 2025 U25 NextGen Classic 6–4 over Manitoba's Jordon McDonald. This granted the Mooibroek rink a spot in Curling Canada's new national "NextGen Program" for the 2025–26 curling season, which included $6,000 in program funding and access to Curling Canada's National Coaches, among other benefits. Team Mooibroek would also participate in the Tier 2 Masters Grand Slam event, where they would lose in the quarterfinals to Kevin Koe. Their success over the previous two seasons would qualify Mooibroek to the 2025 Canadian Olympic Curling Pre-Trials, where they would finish round robin play at 3–4, finishing in 6th place.

=== Mixed ===
In 2024, Wiebe led a mixed team of Shaela Hayward, Ty Dilello and Jennifer Clark-Rouire to victory at the Manitoba mixed provincial championship. This sent the team to the 2024 Canadian Mixed Curling Championship where they finished 7–3 through the round robin and championship pools to earn a spot in the playoffs. They then lost to Nova Scotia in the semifinal and Alberta in the bronze medal game, placing fourth.

== Personal life ==
Wiebe is currently an actuarial science student at the University of Manitoba.

== Teams ==
| Season | Skip | Third | Second | Lead |
|---|---|---|---|---|
| 2015–16 | Ryan Wiebe | Ghislain Courcelles | Adam Flatt | Sean Flatt |
| 2016–17 | Ryan Wiebe | Ghislain Courcelles | Adam Flatt | Sean Flatt |
| 2017–18 | Ryan Wiebe | Graham Loewen | Sean Flatt | Adam Flatt |
| 2018–19 | Ryan Wiebe | Graham Loewen | Sean Flatt | Adam Flatt |
| 2019–20 | Ryan Wiebe | Carter Watkins | Sean Flatt | Adam Flatt |
| 2020–21 | Ryan Wiebe | Sean Flatt | Zack Bilawka | Adam Flatt |
| 2021–22 | Ryan Wiebe | Sean Flatt | Zack Bilawka | Adam Flatt |
| 2021–22 | Ryan Wiebe | Ty Dilello | Sean Flatt | Adam Flatt |
| 2022–23 | Ryan Wiebe | Ty Dilello | Sean Flatt | Adam Flatt |
| 2023–24 | Ryan Wiebe | Ty Dilello | Sean Flatt | Adam Flatt |
| 2024–25 | Sam Mooibroek | Ryan Wiebe | Scott Mitchell | Nathan Steele |
| 2025–26 | Sam Mooibroek | Ryan Wiebe | Scott Mitchell | Nathan Steele |
| 2026–27 | John Epping | B. J. Neufeld | Ryan Wiebe | Ian McMillan |
