= Ty Dilello =

Canadian author and curler (born 1993)

- Born: August 2, 1993 (age 33); Winnipeg, Manitoba, Canada
- Education: University of Winnipeg
- Occupation: Author
- Writing career
- Genre: Sports
- Notable works: Golden Boys: The Top 50 Manitoba Hockey Players of All Time (2017); Mosienko: The Man Who Caught Lightning In A Bottle (2021)

Curling career

Team
- Curling club: RE/MAX Centre, St. John's, NL

Curling career
- Member Association: Manitoba (2013–2024); Newfoundland and Labrador (2024–present)
- Brier: 1 (2025)
- Top CTRS ranking: 8th (2022–23 curling season)

Ty Dilello (also spelled Di Lello; born August 2, 1993) is a Canadian author from Winnipeg, Manitoba who is employed by the International Ice Hockey Federation. He is also a curler who skips his own team out of Newfoundland and Labrador.

== Writing career ==
Dilello started his writing career in 2011 by starting up his very own blog, Jets Talk. This was an independent blog that Dilello developed to discuss the Winnipeg Jets hockey franchise after their return to the NHL in 2011.

In 2013, Dilello released his first published book that was titled Hockey Hotbeds. This book was a collection of hockey stories across varying towns and cities around the world. It featured interviews from players such as Anze Kopitar and Pekka Rinne.

In 2018, Dilello published a book that was titled Golden Boys: The Top 50 Manitoba Hockey Players Of All Time. This book was published in time for the 100th anniversary of the NHL and featured several players who helped shape hockey in Manitoba. This book won the Sweeney Award in 2019.

Dilello published one of his most notable books, Mosienko: The Man Who Caught Lightning in a Bottle, in 2021. This was a book that told the story of Manitoba hockey legend Bill Mosienko.

== Curling career ==
Dilello started finding success in curling during the 2021–22 curling season, where he played third for the Ryan Wiebe rink out of the Fort Rouge Curling Club in Winnipeg. Provincially, the team would have continued success in the highly-competitive Manitoba Men's Curling Championship, finishing 3rd in 2022, 5th in 2023, and 5th again in 2024. The team also played in the 2022 and 2023 Tour Challenge Tier 2 Grand Slam events, where they finished 5th in both events with an identical 3–2 record. The Wiebe rink also competed in the 2023 PointsBet Invitational, where after beating John Epping in the Sweet 16, lost to Brad Gushue 8–4 in the Elite 8. The Wiebe team disbanded at the end of the 2023–24 curling season.

In 2024, Dilello also played second for Ryan Wiebe's mixed curling team, which won the Manitoba Mixed Provincial Championships. In the 2024 Canadian Mixed Curling Championship, the Wiebe rink finished the round robin at the top of Pool B and qualify themselves to the playoffs. In the playoffs, they lost to Team Owen Purcell in the 2v3 semi-finals, and then lose to Team Kurt Balderston in the bronze medal game which led to them finishing the tournament in fourth place.

At the beginning of the 2024–25 curling season, Dilello linked up with the Ryan McNeil Lamswood rink in Newfoundland and Labrador and ended up skipping the team for the season. In the 2025 Newfoundland and Labrador Tankard, the newly-formed Dilello rink progressed through the 12-team triple knockout with a 9–1 record and defeated Andrew Symonds in a game that went down to the final rock. This qualified Dilello for the 2025 Montana's Brier, which became Dilello's first career Brier. There, Dilello's team finished 1–7 after round robin play.

== Personal life ==
Dilello graduated from Dakota Collegiate and studied history at the University of Winnipeg. Dilello was also a professional tennis player, having played on the ITF junior and men's tour. He is married and lives in Niverville, Manitoba. He has also worked as a sports reporter for the Carman-Dufferin Standard newspaper, and for the Winnipeg Sun.
