= Rob Gordon (curler) =

Canadian curler (born 1995)

- Curler
- Born: Robbie Gordon; November 28, 1995 (age 30); Winnipeg, Manitoba, Canada

Team
- Curling club: Granite CC, Winnipeg, MB
- Mixed doubles partner: Robyn Henry

Curling career
- Member Association: Manitoba
- Brier: 3 (2022, 2023, 2024)
- Other appearances: CJCC: 1 (2016); WJCC: 1 (2016)
- Top CTRS ranking: 10th (2017–18)
Medal record
Men's curling
Representing Canada
World Junior Curling Championships
Bronze medal – third place	2016 Copenhagen

Robbie Gordon (born November 28, 1995) is a Canadian curler from Winnipeg, Manitoba. He is currently the coach of the Braden Calvert rink.

== Career ==
Gordon joined the 2013 Canadian Junior Curling Championships winning rink of Matt Dunstone for the 2014–15 season. The team lost in the finals of the Manitoba Canola Juniors to Braden Calvert in 2015. The team would win the Manitoba juniors the following year in 2016. This earned the Dunstone rink a spot in the 2016 Canadian Juniors where Gordon would win his first championship after defeating Northern Ontario 11–4 in the final, and represented Canada at the 2016 World Junior Curling Championships, winning a bronze medal. At the 2016 Manitoba championship, he played with Dunstone, losing in the final to Mike McEwen. Had they won the event, they would've declined their berth into the Brier as it conflicted with the 2016 World Juniors.

Gordon would stay with teammates Colton Lott and Kyle Doering but would bring on Jason Gunnlaugson to skip the team. The team won the Performance Spider Midweek Special and finished fourth at the 2017 Viterra Championship, Manitoba's provincial championship. Gunnlaugson would stay for just one season with the team before forming a new team. Lott, Doering and Gordon added veteran skip Pat Simmons to their team. The team competed at the 2017 Canadian Olympic Curling Pre-Trials where they missed the playoffs with a 2–4 record. The team played in three Grand Slam events that season, making it to the quarterfinals of the 2017 Tour Challenge. At the 2018 Manitoba provincials, the team failed to make the playoffs. Gordon left longtime teammates Lott and Doering after the season and joined the Calvert rink with Kyle Kurz at third and Ian McMillan at second.

Team Calvert had a fairly successful first season together, beginning with the 2018 Icebreaker at The Granite where they won the event title. They also won The Sunova Spiel at East St. Paul and the Thistle Integrity Stakes the following two months and had semifinal appearances at both the DeKalb Superspiel and the KKP Classic. The team also played in three Grand Slam events, failing to qualify for the playoffs in any of them. At the 2019 Viterra Championship, they were eliminated in the championship round. The following season, the team would only win one tour event, the Atkins Curling Supplies Classic, where they went undefeated to claim the title. Elsewhere on tour, the team had semifinal appearances at the 2019 Cargill Curling Training Centre Icebreaker, the 2019 AMJ Campbell Shorty Jenkins Classic, the Mother Club Fall Curling Classic and the 2019 China Open where they represented Canada. Team Calvert only qualified for one slam that season, the 2019 Tour Challenge Tier 2, where they missed the playoffs with a 1–3 record. At the 2020 Viterra Championship, the team failed to qualify for the championship round as they were knocked out in the B Qualifier by 2020 World Junior champion Jacques Gauthier.

During the abbreviated 2020–21 season, Team Calvert played in two events, reaching the semifinals in the Atkins Curling Supplies Classic and missing the playoffs in the MCT Cargill Curling Training Centre Fall Classic. Due to the COVID-19 pandemic in Manitoba, the 2021 provincial championship was cancelled. As the reigning provincials champions, Team Jason Gunnlaugson was chosen to represent Manitoba at the 2021 Tim Hortons Brier. However, due to many provinces cancelling their provincial championships due to the COVID-19 pandemic in Canada, Curling Canada added three Wild Card teams to the national championship, which were based on the CTRS standings from the 2019–20 season. Team Calvert ranked three places to low in the rankings to qualify for the event, ranking just below Glenn Howard, Tanner Horgan and Scott McDonald. The team began the following season with two finals appearances at the Mother Club Fall Curling Classic and the Atkins Curling Supplies Classic, winning the latter. The team also had enough points to qualify for the 2021 Canadian Olympic Curling Pre-Trials for a chance to qualify for the 2021 Canadian Olympic Curling Trials. At the Pre-Trials, they finished with a 2–4 record, missing the playoffs. Due to their early success, Team Calvert qualified for the 2021 National Grand Slam event, where they finished with a 1–3 record. At the 2022 Viterra Championship, the team qualified through the A event with two straight victories, and then won their first championship round game to reach the 1 vs. 2 page qualifier. They then lost two straight games to Mike McEwen and Ryan Wiebe, not qualifying for the playoffs. They wrapped up their season at the 2022 Best of the West where they lost in a tiebreaker to Karsten Sturmay.

== Personal life ==
Gordon currently lives in Winnipeg and currently works as an athlete support officer with World Curling. He married fellow curler Kristin Gordon in July 2024.

== Teams ==
Season	Skip	Third	Second	Lead	Alternate
2013–14	Cole Peters	Connor McIntyre	Curtis Kaatz	Rob Gordon	
2014–15	Matt Dunstone	Colton Lott	Kyle Doering	Rob Gordon	
2015–16	Matt Dunstone	Colton Lott	Kyle Doering	Rob Gordon	Wade Ford (WJCC)
2016–17	Jason Gunnlaugson	Colton Lott	Kyle Doering	Rob Gordon	
2017–18	Pat Simmons	Colton Lott	Kyle Doering	Rob Gordon	
2018–19	Braden Calvert	Kyle Kurz	Ian McMillan	Rob Gordon	
2019–20	Braden Calvert	Kyle Kurz	Ian McMillan	Rob Gordon	Justin Richter
2020–21	Braden Calvert	Kyle Kurz	Ian McMillan	Rob Gordon	
2021–22	Braden Calvert	Kyle Kurz	Ian McMillan	Rob Gordon	
2022–23	Braden Calvert	Kyle Kurz	Ian McMillan	Rob Gordon	
