= Brendan Bilawka =

Canadian curler (born 1997)

- Curler
- Born: March 13, 1997 (age 29); Winnipeg, Manitoba

Team
- Skip: Braden Calvert
- Third: Corey Chambers
- Second: Kyle Kurz
- Lead: Brendan Bilawka

Curling career
- Member Association: Manitoba
- Brier: 1 (2026)
Medal record
Men's curling
Representing Canada
World Mixed Curling Championship
Gold medal – first place	2019 Aberdeen
Representing Manitoba
Gold medal – first place	2015 Prince George

Brendan Bilawka (born March 19, 1997) is a Canadian curler from Dugald, Manitoba. He currently plays lead for the Braden Calvert rink. He is a former World Mixed curling champion.

== Career ==
=== Youth ===
Bilawka, originally from East St. Paul, Manitoba, won a gold medal at the 2015 Canada Winter Games, playing lead for Team Manitoba, skipped by Colin Kurz.

Bilawka won a provincial junior title in 2017 playing lead for JT Ryan, defeating two-time Canadian junior champion Braden Calvert in the final. The team represented Manitoba at the 2017 Canadian Junior Curling Championships, where they ended up losing in a tiebreaker to Ontario's Matthew Hall.

Team Ryan won a second-straight provincial junior title the following year, defeating Jordan Peters in the men's final. At the 2018 Canadian Junior Curling Championships, they made it to the playoffs, where they lost to British Columbia's Tyler Tardi rink in the semifinal.

=== Mixed ===
Bilawka played second for the Colin Kurz mixed team for the 2018–19 curling season. The team, which also included Meghan Walter at third and Sara Oliver at lead won the provincial title in 2018. The team finished 7–3 through the round robin and championship round to qualify for the playoffs as the second seed. They then beat Ontario 9–1 in the semifinal before winning 7–4 over Nova Scotia in the gold medal game. The win qualified the team to represent Canada at the 2019 World Mixed Curling Championship where they dominated through the round robin with a 7–0 record. In the playoffs, they scored wins over Sweden, Denmark and Norway to qualify for the gold medal game against Germany's Andy Kapp. There, the Canadian team scored two in the eighth end for a 6–5 win to become the world champions.

=== Men's ===
Bilawka was the alternate on the Daley Peters rink at the 2016 Viterra Championship, the provincial men's championship. The team lost in the Qualifier 4 final.

The JT Ryan junior rink also competed in men's events, and went 1–2 at the 2017 Viterra Championship. They had more success at the 2018 Viterra Championship, losing in the semifinal to Team Mike McEwen.

Bilawka joined the William Lyburn rink for the 2018–19 season. That season, they won the Brandon Men's Bonspiel, qualifying the team for the 2019 Viterra Championship. There, the team made it to the final, where they lost to Team Reid Carruthers. Following the season, it was announced that Bilawka would be returning to play with Ryan as his second.

The new-look Ryan rink finished with a 3–2 record at the 2020 Viterra Championship. After missing a season due to the COVID-19 pandemic in Manitoba, the team returned at the 2022 Viterra Championship, again going 3–2.

Bilawka joined the Corey Chambers rink for the 2022–23 curling season as his lead. The team played in the 2023 Viterra Championship, where they went 4–3. The following season, both Chambers and Bilawka joined up with Braden Calvert, with Calvert skipping the rink. Bilawka had played in a cashspiel the previous season for Calvert. In their first season together, they would compete in the 2024 Viterra Championship, where they would go undefeated until losing to Team Carruthers 6–3 in the final. The following season, Team Calvert would continue to find success on the Manitoba Curling Tour, winning the Atkins Curling Supplies Classic, DeKalb Superspiel, MCT Showdown, and MCT Championships. The team would again compete in the 2025 Viterra Championship, where they would again go undefeated before losing to Carruthers in the final. Their results over those two seasons would qualify Team Calvert for the 2025 Canadian Olympic Curling Pre-Trials. At the Pre-Trials, Calvert would have a strong week - finishing first in the round robin with a 5–2 record, but would finish in second place, losing to Manitoba rival Jordon McDonald 2–1 in the best-of-three final for the sole spot at the Olympic Trails. They would also play in the 2026 Bunge Championship, the newly renamed Manitoba men's provincials, where they would again face provincial rivals Team McDonald in the final, but this time would win 10–7 in an extra end. This was Bilawka's first Manitoba men's title, qualifying the team to represent Manitoba at the 2026 Montana's Brier. At the Brier, the team made it to the championship round, where they were eliminated by defending champion (and the Olympic gold medallist) Brad Jacobs rink.

== Personal life ==
Bilawka is married and works is an elementary school physical education teacher at Holy Cross School.
