= Kyle Doering =

Canadian curler

- Curler
- Born: December 14, 1995 (age 30); Winnipeg, Manitoba, Canada

Team
- Curling club: Granite CC, Winnipeg, MB
- Mixed doubles partner: Briane Harris

Curling career
- Member Association: Manitoba (2010–2022; 2024–present); Alberta (2022–2024)
- Brier: 3 (2022, 2023, 2025)
- World Championship: 1 (2024)
- Top CTRS ranking: 6th (2022–23)
Medal record
Men's curling
Representing Canada
World Championships
Silver medal – second place	2024 Schaffhausen
World Junior Curling Championships
Bronze medal – third place	2016 Copenhagen
Representing Manitoba
Canada Winter Games
Bronze medal – third place	2011 Halifax

Kyle Doering (born December 14, 1995) is a Canadian curler from Winnipeg, Manitoba. He is a former Canadian junior champion and World junior bronze medallist.

== Career ==
=== Youth ===
Doering's first major curling accomplishment was at the 2011 Canada Winter Games, where he led his Manitoba rink of Colton Lott, Derek Oryniak, and Lucas Van Den Bosch to a bronze medal. The same rink won the Manitoba Junior Championship in 2012 and represented the province at the 2012 Canadian Junior Curling Championships. At age 16, Doering was the youngest skip there. He led his rink to a 9–3 round-robin record, putting them in a tiebreaker match against Nova Scotia's Stuart Thompson. They beat Nova Scotia, sending them to the semifinal against Northern Ontario, skipped by Brennan Wark, which they lost 7–3. Doering skipped at the 2013 Manitoba Juniors as well, losing in the semifinal, and made it to the quarterfinals in 2014.

Doering skipped the University of Winnipeg rink at the 2015 CIS/CCA Curling Championships. He led his team of Ty Dilello, Oryniak, and Rob Gordon to a 4–3 round-robin record. They then lost the semifinal against the University of Alberta, skipped by Thomas Scoffin.

Doering won a second Manitoba junior title in 2016 playing second for Matt Dunstone. Representing Manitoba, the team, which also consisted of Colton Lott and Gordon lost just one game at the 2016 Canadian Junior Curling Championships en route to a national title. The team then went on to represent Canada at the 2016 World Junior Curling Championships. There, the team lost two round-robin games, then lost the 3 vs. 4-page playoff game against Switzerland's Yannick Schwaller. The team had a re-match against Switzerland in the bronze medal game, which they won. Off the curling rink, Doering and the team's alternate Wade Ford ended up saving the life of a local Danish construction worker, after he was pinned under a backhoe-type machine. The two were walking from their hotel to the curling rink at the time, along with Doering's grandfather. Doering's grandfather, Ford, and a passer-by lifted the machine, while Doering pulled the worker out, thereby saving his life.

In 2016, Doering joined the Braden Calvert junior rink. The team played in the 2017 Manitoba junior finals, where they lost to J. T. Ryan in the final.

Doering played in the 2018 U Sports/Curling Canada University Curling Championships for the University of Winnipeg, this time on a team skipped by J. T. Ryan. This team went on to pick up a silver medal.

=== Men's curling ===
While still a junior, Doering played one season for the Jason Gunnlaugson rink in 2014–15, playing second on the team. The rink played in the 2015 Safeway Championship, Doering's first trip to the Manitoba Men's Championship. There, Team Gunnlaugson won five games and almost made it to the playoffs. The following season, as a member of the Dunstone junior rink, Doering played in the 2016 Viterra Championship, that year's provincial men's championship. There, the team made it all the way to the final before losing to Mike McEwen in the Manitoba final. On the World Curling Tour, the team won the Bernick's Miller Lite Open event that season.

In 2016, Gunnlaugson took over the team, with Doering continuing to play second on the team. The team played in the 2017 Viterra Championship. There, the team made it to the playoffs but lost to Trevor Loreth in the 3 vs. 4 game. On the tour, the team won the Performance Spider Midweek Special earlier in the season.

In 2017, Pat Simmons replaced Gunnalugson as the team's skip. The team played at the 2017 Canadian Olympic Pre-Trials, where the team finished 2–4, failing to make the playoffs. The team played in several Grand Slam events that season. They began the season playing in the 2017 GSOC Tour Challenge, losing in the quarterfinals. They then played in the 2017 Masters of Curling, where they finished the event win-less. Then they played in the 2017 Boost National, losing in a tiebreaker. The team played in the 2018 Viterra Championship but did not make the playoffs.

Doering joined the William Lyburn rink at second for the 2018–19 curling season. The team made it all the way to the final of the 2019 Viterra Championship before losing to Team Reid Carruthers.

After one season with Lyburn, Doering joined the Tanner Horgan rink at second for the 2019–20 curling season. On the tour, the team won the 2019 DeKalb Superspiel and the Manitoba Curling Tour Classic. At the 2020 Viterra Championship, the team did not make the playoffs.

After the COVID-19 pandemic abbreviated 2020–21 season, Doering joined up again with Simmons for the again for the 2021–22 curling season. They played in the 2021 Canadian Olympic Curling Pre-Trials, where they finished with a 4–2 round-robin record. The team made the playoffs, where they lost in the B Semifinal to Glenn Howard. The team's third Colton Lott later took over the team that season and led them at the 2022 Viterra Championship. Lott led the team all the way to the final, where they lost to Mike McEwen. Doering was asked to be the alternate for Team McEwen at the 2022 Tim Hortons Brier, where they represented Manitoba. It was Doering's first trip to the Brier. Doering played in one game, and the team was eliminated after losing a tiebreaker. Doering joined the Alberta-based Team Karsten Sturmay to wrap up the season. They played in the 2022 Champions Cup Grand Slam event and finished 1–4.

Doering remained on Team Sturmay for the 2022–23 curling season. The team began the season at the 2022 PointsBet Invitational, where they were eliminated after losing their first game against Colton Flasch. The team played in the 2023 Boston Pizza Cup, the Alberta men's provincial championship. There, they made it to the playoffs, losing to Aaron Sluchinski in the C1 vs. C2 page playoff game. The team is still qualified for the 2023 Tim Hortons Brier as the third Wild Card entry, after earning enough points on tour, by winning events like the Ed Werenich Golden Wrench Classic and the McKee Homes Fall Curling Classic. Doering is the current coach of the Polish Mixed Doubles national team.

=== Mixed doubles ===
Doering and partner Ashley Groff played at the 2018 and 2019 Canadian Mixed Doubles Curling Championships, going 2–5 at both events.

== Personal life ==
Doering attended Garden City Collegiate in Winnipeg, and then the University of Winnipeg. He is in a relationship with Ashley Groff.
