= Alex Forrest (curler) =

Canadian curler (born 1989)

- Curler
- Born: February 13, 1989 (age 37); Winnipeg, Manitoba, Canada

Team
- Curling club: Fort Rouge CC, Winnipeg, MB
- Skip: Andrew Irving
- Third: Brad Van Walleghem
- Second: Alex Forrest
- Lead: Roy Janz

Curling career
- Member Association: Manitoba
- Brier: 1 (2020)
- Top CTRS ranking: 6th (2017–18)

Alex Forrest (born February 13, 1989) is a Canadian curler from Winnipeg, Manitoba. Until 2020, he played third for the Jason Gunnlaugson rink.

== Career ==
=== Juniors ===
Forrest made his first and only Canadian Junior Curling Championships appearance in 2010 skipping Team Manitoba. The team finished the round robin in first place only suffering two losses to Northern Ontario and Saskatchewan. This meant the team had an automatic bye to the final. There, they faced Ontario who they had previously beaten in the round robin. The team gave up two in the final end to lose the game 8–7. Forrest curled an average 80% during the round robin, which was second among skips.

=== Men's ===
Forrest played second for the Jeff Stoughton rink for the 2014–15 season, which would be Stoughton's last. The team played in four Grand Slam of Curling events but only qualified in one, the 2014 Masters. At the 2015 Manitoba provincials, the team qualified for the championship round as the third seed. They defeated Braden Calvert 6–4 in the 3 vs. 4 game before being eliminated in the semifinal by the Mike McEwen rink.

The following season Forrest went back to skipping his own team. At the 2016 Viterra Championship, his rink of Travis Bale, Ian McMillan and Connor Njegovan failed to make the final four championship round after losing the Double Knockout qualifier against Matt Dunstone 7–3. Forrest joined Dunstone the following season with McMillan and Njegovan to try to qualify for the Brier again at the 2017 Viterra Championship. But once again, his team would be bested in the Double Knockout round, this time to Jason Gunnlaugson.

For the 2017–18 season, Forrest would once again stay with McMillan and Njegovan but would bring on Gunnlaugson to skip the team. The team had a successful Grand Slam season, playing in every slam and qualifying in six of the seven events including winning the 2017 Tour Challenge Tier 2. However at the 2018 Viterra Championship, the team struggled going 1–2 in the Double Knockout bracket and missing the playoffs. The team had a less successful following season, only playing five slam and qualifying in one of them. At this years provincials, the team qualified for the Championship Round as the number one seed. But they fell apart in the playoffs, losing the 1 vs. 2 game against Carruthers and the semifinal against Lyburn. The team did get to represent Canada at the Second Leg of the 2018–19 Curling World Cup, where they went 1–5.

The team won the 2019 Cargill Curling Training Centre Icebreaker to start the 2019–20 season. They also won the Mother Club Fall Curling Classic and the Ed Werenich Golden Wrench Classic. Forrest won his first Provincial title at the 2020 Viterra Championship after defeating the Mike McEwen rink 7–4 in the final. Team Gunnlaugson represented Manitoba at the 2020 Tim Hortons Brier, where they finished in eighth place with a 5–6 record.

== Personal life ==
Forrest works as a project manager/carpenter for Vantage Builders. He is married to D'Arcy Forrest and has two children, Mila and Bates.

== Teams ==
Season	Skip	Third	Second	Lead
2009–10	Alex Forrest	Joey Witherspoon	Connor Njegovan	Mike Neufeld
2010–11	William Lyburn	James Kirkness	Alex Forrest	Greg Melnichuk
2011–12	William Lyburn	James Kirkness	Alex Forrest	Tyler Forrest
2012–13	William Lyburn	James Kirkness	Alex Forrest	Tyler Forrest
2013–14	William Lyburn	Alex Forrest	Connor Njegovan	Tyler Forrest
2014–15	Jeff Stoughton	Rob Fowler	Alex Forrest	Connor Njegovan
2015–16	Alex Forrest	Travis Bale	Ian McMillan	Connor Njegovan
2016–17	Matt Dunstone	Alex Forrest	Ian McMillan	Connor Njegovan
2017–18	Jason Gunnlaugson	Alex Forrest	Ian McMillan	Connor Njegovan
2018–19	Jason Gunnlaugson	Alex Forrest	Denni Neufeld	Connor Njegovan
2019–20	Jason Gunnlaugson	Alex Forrest	Adam Casey	Connor Njegovan
2022–23	Alex Forrest	Taylor McIntyre	Daniel Gagne	Derek Blanchard
2023–24	Andrew Irving	Brad Van Walleghem	Alex Forrest	Roy Janz
