= Corey Chambers =

Canadian curler (born 1997)

- Curler
- Born: December 24, 1986 (age 39); Winnipeg, Manitoba, Canada

Team
- Curling club: Heather CC
- Skip: Braden Calvert
- Third: Corey Chambers
- Second: Kyle Kurz
- Lead: Brendan Bilawka

Curling career
- Member Association: Manitoba
- Brier: 1 (2026)
- Top CTRS ranking: 8th (2025–26)

Corey Chambers (born December 24, 1986) is a Canadian curler. He competed as third with Braden Calvert at the 2026 Montana's Brier. Chambers participated in the 2025 Canadian Olympic Curling Trials participating in the pre-qualifying event, but losing to the Jordon McDonald in the final.

== Personal life ==
As of 2026, Chambers worked as a mental health worker in Selkirk, Manitoba. He injured his knee in 2019 and required ACL reconstruction surgery.

== Teams ==
Season	Skip	Third	Second	Lead
2010–11	Sean Grassie	Corey Chambers	Scott McCammis	Stuart Shiells
2011–12	Sean Grassie	Corey Chambers	Kody Janzen	Stuart Shiells
2012–13	Sean Grassie	Corey Chambers	Kody Janzen	Stuart Shiells
2013–14	Sean Grassie	Corey Chambers	Kody Janzen	Stuart Shiells
2014–116	Sean Grassie	Corey Chambers	Kody Janzen	Stuart Shiells
2015–16	Daley Peters	Corey Chambers	Kody Janzen	Stuart Shiells
2016–17	Daley Peters	Corey Chambers	Kody Janzen	Stuart Shiells
2017–18	Joey Witherspoon	Corey Chambers	Taylor McIntyre	Kody Janzen
2018–19	Corey Chambers	Julien Leduc	Devon Wiebe	Stuart Shiells
2019–20	Corey Chambers	Julien Leduc	Devon Wiebe	Stuart Shiells
2020–21	Corey Chambers	Julien Leduc	Devon Wiebe	Stuart Shiells
2023–24	Braden Calvert	Corey Chambers	Kyle Kurz	Brendan Bilawka
2024–25	Braden Calvert	Corey Chambers	Kyle Kurz	Brendan Bilawka
2025–26	Braden Calvert	Corey Chambers	Kyle Kurz	Brendan Bilawka
2026–27	Braden Calvert	Corey Chambers	Kyle Kurz	Brendan Bilawka
