= Steve Irwin (curler) =

Canadian curler (born 1982)

- Curler
- Born: July 18, 1982 (age 44); Carberry, Manitoba

Team
- Curling club: Brandon CC; Brandon, MB
- Skip: Steve Irwin
- Third: Daley Peters
- Second: Travis Taylor
- Lead: Travis Brooks
- Alternate: Kody Janzen

Curling career
- Member Association: Manitoba

Steven Irwin (born July 18, 1982 in Carberry, Manitoba) is a Canadian curler from Brandon, Manitoba. He skips a team on the World Curling Tour.

Irwin, representing the Brandon Curling Club, is a three-time provincial curling club champion, having won in 2010, 2012 and 2013. As such, he represented Manitoba at the 2010 The Dominion Curling Club Championship, the 2012 The Dominion Curling Club Championship and the 2013 The Dominion Curling Club Championship. In 2010, he led his rink to a semi-final loss, after posting a 6-0 record. In 2012, his team was undefeated until losing to Alberta in the final. In 2013 he found less success, winning just one game in the championship.

On the World Curling Tour, Irwin played third for the Terry McNamee rink until forming his own team in 2013. The 2014 Safeway Championship was Irwin's first provincial championship as a skip after leaving the McNamee rink. At the provincial championships, he led his team all the way to the playoffs, where he lost in the 3 vs. 4 game.

Irwin's sister, Stacey is another competitive curler.
