= Sean Grassie =

Canadian curler (born 1978)

- Curler
- Born: October 18, 1978 (age 48); Winnipeg, Manitoba

Team
- Curling club: Deer Lodge CC; Winnipeg, MB
- Skip: Sean Grassie
- Third: Tyler Drews
- Second: Daryl Evans
- Lead: Rodney Legault
- Alternate: Nick Drews

Curling career
- Member Association: Manitoba
- World Mixed Doubles Championship: 1 (2009)
- Top CTRS ranking: 22nd (2019–20)
Medal record
Curling
Representing Canada
World Mixed Doubles Curling Championship
Bronze medal – third place	2009 Cortina d'Ampezzo

Sean Grassie (born October 18, 1978) is a Canadian curler from Winnipeg, Manitoba.

== Career ==
=== Juniors ===
As a junior, Grassie and his rink of Scott Madams, Ton Tomyk and Scott Grassie won the Manitoba Junior Men's Championship in 1999. The team represented Manitoba at the 1999 Canadian Junior Curling Championships, where they finished with a 6–6 record.

=== Mixed ===
Grassie has found a lot of his success in mixed curling. He has won two Manitoba Mixed titles, in 2009 and 2011. In 2009, his rink of Allison Nimik (Flaxey), Ross Derksen and Kendra Green would represent Manitoba at the 2009 Canadian Mixed Curling Championship. The team finished the round robin with a 10–1 record, in first place. This put them in the final, against Ontario, which they won. Grassie and Nimik then went on to represent Canada at the 2009 World Mixed Doubles Curling Championship. The pair won their pool, winning all eight games, however lost in the semi-final to Hungary. They recovered in the bronze medal game, defeating China to finish third.

Grassie and a new mixed rink of Tracey Lavery, Scott McCamis and Calleen Neufeld represented Manitoba at the 2012 Canadian Mixed Curling Championship. Grassie led Manitoba to an 8–5 record, which was not good enough to make the playoffs.

Grassie would return to represent Manitoba with a new team of Roxie Trembath, Jordan Johnson, and Hilary Johnson at the 2025 Canadian Mixed Curling Championship. The Manitoba rink would finish in 4th place, losing to Saskatchewan's Jason Ackerman in the bronze medal game.

== Personal life ==
In addition to being an accomplished curler, Grassie also wrote a book about the history of the MCA Bonspiel, called "Kings of the Rings". Grassie is currently employed as a tennis teaching pro.
