= 2018 Elite 10 =

2018 Elite 10 may refer to:

- 2018 Elite 10 (March)
- 2018 Elite 10 (September)
