= Elite 10 =

Former Grand Slam of Curling event

- Established: 2015
- September 2018 host city: Chatham, Ontario
- September 2018 arena: St. Clair Campus Arena
- Purse: CAD$100,000

Current champions (September 2018)
- Men: (Newfoundland and Labrador) Brad Gushue
- Women: (Sweden) Anna Hasselborg

Current edition
- 2018 Elite 10 (September)

The Elite 10 (branded as the Princess Auto Elite 10 for sponsorship reasons) was a curling bonspiel, held as part of the Grand Slam of Curling series. First held in the 2014–15 curling season, it was played between ten top-ranked teams, and utilized a match play system.

The event was dropped from the Grand Slam calendar for the 2019–20 curling season.

== Format ==
Instead of normal curling scoring rules, the Elite 10 used a match play system in which scoring is based on ends won, rather than rocks scored. An end is won by stealing or scoring two with the hammer, similar to skins curling. Unlike skins, however, there are no carry-overs. In the event of a tie, a draw to the button competition is held to determine the winner. In the standings, wins are worth three points, draw to the button wins are worth two points, and draw to the button losses are worth one point.

== Past champions ==
=== Men ===
Year	Winning team	Runner-up team	Location	Purse
2015	(Manitoba) Mike McEwen, B. J. Neufeld, Matt Wozniak, Denni Neufeld	(Sweden) Niklas Edin, Oskar Eriksson, Kristian Lindström, Christoffer Sundgren	Fort McMurray, Alberta	$100,000
2016	(Newfoundland and Labrador) Brad Gushue, Mark Nichols, Brett Gallant, Geoff Walker	(Manitoba) Reid Carruthers, Braeden Moskowy, Derek Samagalski, Colin Hodgson	Colwood, British Columbia	$100,000
2017	(British Columbia) Jim Cotter, John Morris (skip), Tyrel Griffith, Rick Sawatsky	(Ontario) Brad Jacobs, Ryan Fry, E. J. Harnden, Ryan Harnden	Port Hawkesbury, Nova Scotia	$100,000
March 2018	(Manitoba) Mike McEwen, B. J. Neufeld, Matt Wozniak, Denni Neufeld	(Newfoundland and Labrador) Brad Gushue, Mark Nichols, Brett Gallant, Geoff Walker	Winnipeg, Manitoba	$100,000
September 2018	(Newfoundland and Labrador) Brad Gushue, Mark Nichols, Brett Gallant, Geoff Walker	(Manitoba) Mike McEwen, Reid Carruthers, Derek Samagalski, Colin Hodgson	Chatham, Ontario	$100,000

=== Women ===
Year	Winning team	Runner-up team	Location	Purse
September 2018	(Sweden) Anna Hasselborg, Sara McManus, Agnes Knochenhauer, Sofia Mabergs	(Switzerland) Alina Pätz, Silvana Tirinzoni (skip), Esther Neuenschwander, Melanie Barbezat	Chatham, Ontario	$100,000
