= 2015 Elite 10 =

Grand Slam of Curling event

- Host city: Fort McMurray, Alberta
- Arena: Suncor Community Leisure Centre
- Dates: March 19–22
- Winner: (Manitoba) Mike McEwen
- Curling club: Fort Rouge CC, Winnipeg
- Skip: Mike McEwen
- Third: B.J. Neufeld
- Second: Matt Wozniak
- Lead: Denni Neufeld
- Finalist: (Sweden) Niklas Edin

The 2015 Elite 10 was held from March 19 to 22 at the Suncor Community Leisure Centre at MacDonald Island Park in Fort McMurray, Alberta. It was the fourth men's Grand Slam event held in the 2014–15 curling season. The Mike McEwen rink from Winnipeg won their fifth career Grand Slam title, defeating the Niklas Edin rink from Sweden in the final.

== Competition format ==
The Elite 10 event features what is called a "match-play" format, in which the winning team of a particular game is the team that has won the most ends in that game. In match play, an end is won by stealing or scoring two with the hammer, similar to skins curling. Unlike skins, however, there are no carry-overs. Tied games will have a draw to the button competition to determine the winner. In the standings, wins are worth three points, draw to the button wins are worth two points, and draw to the button losses are worth one point.

== Teams ==
The teams are listed as follows:

Skip	Third	Second	Lead	Locale
Reid Carruthers	Braeden Moskowy	Derek Samagalski	Colin Hodgson	Winnipeg, Manitoba
Niklas Edin	Oskar Eriksson	Kristian Lindström	Christoffer Sundgren	Karlstad, Sweden
John Epping	Travis Fanset	Patrick Janssen	Tim March	Toronto, Ontario
Brad Gushue	Mark Nichols	Brett Gallant	Geoff Walker	Newfoundland and Labrador
Glenn Howard	Richard Hart	Jon Mead	Craig Savill	Penetanguishene, Ontario
Brad Jacobs	Ryan Fry	E. J. Harnden	Ryan Harnden	Sault Ste. Marie, Ontario
Kevin Koe	Marc Kennedy	Brent Laing	Ben Hebert	Calgary, Alberta
Steve Laycock	Kirk Muyres	Colton Flasch	Dallan Muyres	Saskatoon, Saskatchewan
Mike McEwen	B. J. Neufeld	Matt Wozniak	Denni Neufeld	Winnipeg, Manitoba
Sven Michel	Florian Meister	Simon Gempeler	Stefan Meienberg	Adelboden, Switzerland

== Round-robin standings ==
Final round-robin standings

Pool B	W	EEW	EEL	L	EW	EL	Pts
(Manitoba) Reid Carruthers	3	0	0	1	12	5	9
(Manitoba) Mike McEwen	3	0	0	1	9	5	9
(Sweden) Niklas Edin	2	0	0	2	9	8	6
(Ontario) Glenn Howard	2	0	0	2	8	8	6
(Saskatchewan) Steve Laycock	0	0	0	4	2	14	0

Pool B	W	EEW	EEL	L	EW	EL	Pts
(Alberta) Kevin Koe	3	0	0	1	13	5	9
(Ontario) Brad Jacobs	3	0	0	1	13	9	9
(Newfoundland and Labrador) Brad Gushue	3	0	0	1	11	8	9
(Ontario) John Epping	1	0	0	3	5	12	3
(Switzerland) Sven Michel	0	0	0	4	6	14	0

== Round-robin results ==
All draw times are listed in Mountain Standard Time (UTC−7).

=== Draw 1 ===
Thursday, March 19, 1:30 pm

Sheet A	1	2	3	4	5	6	7	8	Final
(Saskatchewan) Steve Laycock								X	0
(Manitoba) Mike McEwen 🔨				✓			✓	X	2

Sheet B	1	2	3	4	5	6	7	8	Final
(Newfoundland and Labrador) Brad Gushue				✓	✓	✓	✓	X	4
(Ontario) John Epping 🔨		✓						X	1

Sheet C	1	2	3	4	5	6	7	8	Final
(Alberta) Kevin Koe			✓		✓		✓		3
(Ontario) Brad Jacobs 🔨	✓	✓		✓		✓			4

=== Draw 2 ===
Thursday, March 19, 5:00 pm

Sheet A	1	2	3	4	5	6	7	8	Final
(Alberta) Kevin Koe 🔨	✓	✓		✓			✓	X	4
(Switzerland) Sven Michel					✓			X	1

Sheet B	1	2	3	4	5	6	7	8	Final
(Manitoba) Reid Carruthers				✓		✓	✓	X	3
(Sweden) Niklas Edin 🔨								X	0

Sheet C	1	2	3	4	5	6	7	8	Final
(Ontario) Glenn Howard 🔨	✓	✓	✓	✓		X	X	X	4
(Saskatchewan) Steve Laycock						X	X	X	0

=== Draw 3 ===
Thursday, March 19, 8:30 pm

Sheet A	1	2	3	4	5	6	7	8	Final
(Ontario) Brad Jacobs 🔨		✓			✓			X	2
(Newfoundland and Labrador) Brad Gushue	✓		✓	✓			✓	X	4

Sheet B	1	2	3	4	5	6	7	8	Final
(Ontario) John Epping 🔨		✓	✓	✓		✓	X	X	4
(Switzerland) Sven Michel					✓		X	X	1

Sheet C	1	2	3	4	5	6	7	8	Final
(Manitoba) Mike McEwen 🔨		✓	✓	✓	✓		X	X	4
(Sweden) Niklas Edin	✓						X	X	1

=== Draw 4 ===
Friday, March 20, 10:00 am

Sheet A	1	2	3	4	5	6	7	8	Final
(Ontario) Glenn Howard		✓		✓	✓			X	3
(Manitoba) Reid Carruthers 🔨	✓		✓					X	2

Sheet B	1	2	3	4	5	6	7	8	Final
(Sweden) Niklas Edin 🔨	✓			✓	✓	✓	X	X	4
(Saskatchewan) Steve Laycock			✓				X	X	1

Sheet C	1	2	3	4	5	6	7	8	Final
(Switzerland) Sven Michel	✓	✓							2
(Newfoundland and Labrador) Brad Gushue 🔨			✓		✓			✓	3

=== Draw 5 ===
Friday, March 20, 1:30 pm

Sheet A	1	2	3	4	5	6	7	8	Final
(Newfoundland and Labrador) Brad Gushue							X	X	0
(Alberta) Kevin Koe 🔨				✓	✓	✓	X	X	3

Sheet B	1	2	3	4	5	6	7	8	Final
(Switzerland) Sven Michel		✓					✓		2
(Ontario) Brad Jacobs 🔨	✓		✓		✓				3

Sheet C	1	2	3	4	5	6	7	8	Final
(Manitoba) Reid Carruthers	✓				✓	✓		X	3
(Manitoba) Mike McEwen 🔨		✓						X	1

=== Draw 6 ===
Friday, March 20, 5:00 pm

Sheet B	1	2	3	4	5	6	7	8	Final
(Manitoba) Mike McEwen				✓		✓			2
(Ontario) Glenn Howard 🔨		✓							1

Sheet C	1	2	3	4	5	6	7	8	Final
(Ontario) Brad Jacobs		✓	✓		✓	✓	X	X	4
(Ontario) John Epping 🔨							X	X	0

=== Draw 7 ===
Friday, March 20, 8:30 pm

Sheet A	1	2	3	4	5	6	7	8	Final
(Sweden) Niklas Edin 🔨	✓	✓	✓		✓	X	X	X	4
(Ontario) Glenn Howard						X	X	X	0

Sheet B	1	2	3	4	5	6	7	8	Final
(Ontario) John Epping							X	X	0
(Alberta) Kevin Koe 🔨		✓	✓	✓			X	X	3

Sheet C	1	2	3	4	5	6	7	8	Final
(Saskatchewan) Steve Laycock 🔨				✓				X	1
(Manitoba) Reid Carruthers		✓	✓		✓		✓	X	4

== Tiebreaker ==
Saturday, March 21, 9:30 am

Team	1	2	3	4	5	6	7	8	Final
(Sweden) Niklas Edin 🔨	✓	✓			✓	✓	✓	X	5
(Ontario) Glenn Howard			✓	✓				X	2

Player percentages
(Sweden) Team Edin		(Ontario) Team Howard	
Christoffer Sundgren	84%	Craig Savill	92%
Kristian Lindström	69%	Jon Mead	78%
Oskar Eriksson	72%	Richard Hart	74%
Niklas Edin	85%	Glenn Howard	49%
Total	77%	Total	73%

== Playoffs ==
Quarterfinals
(Newfoundland and Labrador) Brad Gushue	0
(Manitoba) Mike McEwen	4
(Manitoba) Reid Carruthers	1
(Sweden) Niklas Edin	3

Semifinals
(Alberta) Kevin Koe	0
(Manitoba) Mike McEwen	4
(Ontario) Brad Jacobs	2
(Sweden) Niklas Edin	3

Final
(Manitoba) Mike McEwen	4
(Sweden) Niklas Edin	2

=== Quarterfinals ===
Saturday, March 21, 1:00 pm

Team	1	2	3	4	5	6	7	8	Final
(Newfoundland and Labrador) Brad Gushue 🔨						X	X	X	0
(Manitoba) Mike McEwen	✓	✓	✓		✓	X	X	X	4

Player percentages
(Newfoundland and Labrador) Team Gushue		(Manitoba) Team McEwen	
Geoff Walker	100%	Denni Neufeld	96%
Brett Gallant	62%	Matt Wozniak	95%
Mark Nichols	88%	B. J. Neufeld	100%
Brad Gushue	32%	Mike McEwen	92%
Total	70%	Total	96%

Team	1	2	3	4	5	6	7	8	Final
(Manitoba) Reid Carruthers 🔨				✓				X	1
(Sweden) Niklas Edin			✓		✓	✓		X	3

Player percentages
(Manitoba) Team Carruthers		(Sweden) Team Edin	
Colin Hodgson	89%	Christoffer Sundgren	87%
Derek Samagalski	81%	Kristian Lindström	82%
Braeden Moskowy	88%	Oskar Eriksson	85%
Reid Carruthers	63%	Niklas Edin	76%
Total	81%	Total	83%

=== Semifinals ===
Saturday, March 21, 8:00 pm

Team	1	2	3	4	5	6	7	8	Final
(Alberta) Kevin Koe							X	X	0
(Manitoba) Mike McEwen 🔨	✓	✓	✓			✓	X	X	4

Player percentages
(Alberta) Team Koe		(Manitoba) Team McEwen	
Ben Hebert	85%	Denni Neufeld	89%
Brent Laing	62%	Matt Wozniak	92%
Marc Kennedy	75%	B. J. Neufeld	97%
Kevin Koe	56%	Mike McEwen	100%
Total	70%	Total	95%

Team	1	2	3	4	5	6	7	8	Final
(Ontario) Brad Jacobs 🔨		✓		✓				X	2
(Sweden) Niklas Edin	✓		✓				✓	X	3

Player percentages
(Ontario) Team Jacobs		(Sweden) Team Edin	
Ryan Harnden	99%	Christoffer Sundgren	99%
E.J. Harnden	83%	Kristian Lindström	87%
Ryan Fry	74%	Oskar Eriksson	85%
Brad Jacobs	91%	Niklas Edin	84%
Total	87%	Total	89%

=== Final ===
Sunday, March 22, 11:00 am

Team	1	2	3	4	5	6	7	8	Final
(Manitoba) Mike McEwen 🔨	✓		✓		✓		✓	X	4
(Sweden) Niklas Edin		✓				✓		X	2

Player percentages
(Manitoba) Team McEwen		(Sweden) Team Edin	
Denni Neufeld	86%	Christoffer Sundgren	74%
Matt Wozniak	82%	Kristian Lindström	85%
B. J. Neufeld	88%	Oskar Eriksson	82%
Mike McEwen	98%	Niklas Edin	67%
Total	89%	Total	77%
