= 2011 BDO Canadian Open of Curling =

2011 BDO Canadian Open of Curling may refer to one of the following:

- 2011 BDO Canadian Open of Curling (January), the Grand Slam held in January 2011 as part of the 2010–11 curling season
- 2011 BDO Canadian Open of Curling (December), the Grand Slam held in December 2011 as part of the 2011–12 curling season
