= 2010 World Cup of Curling =

Grand Slam of Curling event

2010 Grey Power World Cup of Curling
- Host city: Windsor, Ontario, Canada
- Arena: WFCU Centre
- Dates: November 3–7, 2010
- Winner: Mike McEwen
- Curling club: Winnipeg, Manitoba
- Skip: Mike McEwen
- Third: B. J. Neufeld
- Second: Matt Wozniak
- Lead: Denni Neufeld
- Finalist: Jeff Stoughton

The 2010 Grey Power World Cup of Curling took place at the WFCU Centre in Windsor, Ontario from November 3–7, as part of the 2010 World Curling Tour. It was the first Grand Slam event for the 2010–11 curling season.

The 2010 World Cup featured 18 teams competing in 3 groups in a round-robin tournament format, with the top 8 teams advancing to the quarterfinals. The purse for this event was CAD$100,000. The winner of the tournament was the Mike McEwen rink which received CAD$22,500. It was McEwen's first slam title. He defeated Jeff Stoughton 4-2 in an all-Winnipeg final.

== Teams ==
| Group | Skip | Third | Second | Lead | Locale |
|---|---|---|---|---|---|
| Pool A | Niklas Edin | Sebastian Kraupp | Fredrik Lindberg | Viktor Kjäll | Karlstad, Sweden |
| Pool A | Brad Jacobs | E.J. Harnden | Ryan Harnden | Scott Seabrook | Sault Ste. Marie, Ontario |
| Pool A | Kevin Martin | John Morris | Marc Kennedy | Ben Hebert | Edmonton, Alberta |
| Pool A | Mike McEwen | B.J. Neufeld | Matt Wozniak | Denni Neufeld | Winnipeg, Manitoba |
| Pool A | David Murdoch | James Grattan | Glen Muirhead | Ross Hepburn | Lockerbie, Scotland |
| Pool A | Pat Simmons | Steve Laycock | Brennen Jones | Dallan Muyres | Regina, Saskatchewan |
| Pool B | Ted Appelman | Tom Appelman | Brandon Klassen | Brendan Melnyk | Edmonton, Alberta |
| Pool B | Rob Fowler | Allan Lyburn | Richard Daneault | Derek Samagalski | Brandon, Manitoba |
| Pool B | Glenn Howard | Richard Hart | Brent Laing | Craig Savill | Coldwater, Ontario |
| Pool B | Wayne Middaugh | Joe Frans | Scott Howard | Scott Foster | Toronto, Ontario |
| Pool B | Thomas Ulsrud | Torger Nergård | Christoffer Svae | Håvard Vad Petersson | Oslo, Norway |
| Pool B | Jim Cotter (Note: Skip Bob Ursel was injured, but the team was still referred to as Team Bob Ursel.) | Dean Joanisse | Kevin Folk | Rick Sawatsky | Kelowna/Vernon, British Columbia |
| Pool C | Brent Ross (fourth) | Jake Higgs (skip) | Andrew Clayton | Bill Buchanan | Harriston, Ontario |
| Pool C | Brad Gushue | Randy Ferbey (skip) | Mark Nichols | Ryan Fry | St. John's, Newfoundland and Labrador |
| Pool C | Kevin Koe | Blake MacDonald | Carter Rycroft | Nolan Thiessen | Edmonton, Alberta |
| Pool C | Dale Matchett | Ryan Werenich | Jeff Gorda | Shawn Kaufman | Bradford, Ontario |
| Pool C | Kevin Park | Chris Galbraith | Taren Gesell | Pat McCallum | Winnipeg, Manitoba |
| Pool C | Jeff Stoughton | Jon Mead | Reid Carruthers | Steve Gould | Winnipeg, Manitoba |

== Round robin ==
=== Standings ===
Key
| Teams to Playoffs |
| Teams to Tiebreakers |

| Pool A | W | L | PF | PA |
|---|---|---|---|---|
| (Alberta) Kevin Martin | 4 | 1 | 29 | 19 |
| (Sweden) Niklas Edin | 3 | 2 | 31 | 26 |
| (Manitoba) Mike McEwen | 3 | 2 | 31 | 33 |
| (Saskatchewan) Pat Simmons | 3 | 2 | 27 | 26 |
| (Ontario) Brad Jacobs | 2 | 3 | 28 | 23 |
| (Scotland) David Murdoch | 0 | 5 | 9 | 30 |

| Pool B | W | L | PF | PA |
|---|---|---|---|---|
| (Manitoba) Rob Fowler | 4 | 1 | 34 | 18 |
| (Ontario) Glenn Howard | 3 | 2 | 23 | 25 |
| (Ontario) Wayne Middaugh | 3 | 2 | 24 | 20 |
| (Norway) Thomas Ulsrud | 3 | 2 | 22 | 24 |
| (British Columbia) Bob Ursel | 2 | 3 | 25 | 23 |
| (Alberta) Ted Appelman | 0 | 5 | 15 | 31 |

| Pool C | W | L | PF | PA |
|---|---|---|---|---|
| (Manitoba) Jeff Stoughton | 5 | 0 | 31 | 24 |
| (Newfoundland and Labrador) Brad Gushue | 3 | 2 | 25 | 23 |
| (Alberta) Kevin Koe | 3 | 2 | 30 | 19 |
| (Ontario) Jake Higgs | 2 | 3 | 29 | 28 |
| (Manitoba) Kevin Park | 2 | 3 | 20 | 20 |
| (Ontario) Dale Matchett | 0 | 5 | 19 | 40 |

=== Results ===
All times shown are in Eastern Standard Time.

==== Draw 1 ====
Wednesday, November 3, 7:30 pm

| Sheet A | 1 | 2 | 3 | 4 | 5 | 6 | 7 | 8 | Final |
| (Norway) Thomas Ulsrud 🔨 | 2 | 0 | 0 | 2 | 0 | 1 | 0 | 1 | 6 |
| (British Columbia) Bob Ursel | 0 | 0 | 1 | 0 | 2 | 0 | 2 | 0 | 5 |

| Sheet B | 1 | 2 | 3 | 4 | 5 | 6 | 7 | 8 | 9 | Final |
| (Sweden) Niklas Edin 🔨 | 2 | 1 | 0 | 2 | 1 | 0 | 0 | 0 | 1 | 7 |
| (Ontario) Brad Jacobs | 0 | 0 | 2 | 0 | 0 | 0 | 2 | 2 | 0 | 6 |

| Sheet C | 1 | 2 | 3 | 4 | 5 | 6 | 7 | 8 | Final |
| (Ontario) Glenn Howard 🔨 | 0 | 0 | 1 | 0 | 2 | 0 | 0 | 1 | 4 |
| (Ontario) Wayne Middaugh | 1 | 0 | 0 | 1 | 0 | 1 | 0 | 0 | 3 |

| Sheet D | 1 | 2 | 3 | 4 | 5 | 6 | 7 | 8 | 9 | Final |
| (Alberta) Kevin Koe 🔨 | 0 | 1 | 0 | 0 | 1 | 1 | 0 | 2 | 0 | 5 |
| (Ontario) Jake Higgs | 0 | 0 | 2 | 1 | 0 | 0 | 2 | 0 | 1 | 6 |

| Sheet E | 1 | 2 | 3 | 4 | 5 | 6 | 7 | 8 | Final |
| (Manitoba) Mike McEwen 🔨 | 3 | 0 | 2 | 0 | 0 | 2 | X | X | 7 |
| (Scotland) David Murdoch | 0 | 1 | 0 | 0 | 1 | 0 | X | X | 2 |

==== Draw 2 ====
Thursday, November 4, 10:00 am

| Sheet A | 1 | 2 | 3 | 4 | 5 | 6 | 7 | 8 | Final |
| (Ontario) Dale Matchett | 0 | 2 | 0 | 2 | 0 | 2 | 0 | 0 | 6 |
| (Manitoba) Jeff Stoughton 🔨 | 1 | 0 | 1 | 0 | 1 | 0 | 2 | 3 | 8 |

| Sheet B | 1 | 2 | 3 | 4 | 5 | 6 | 7 | 8 | Final |
| (Alberta) Kevin Martin 🔨 | 2 | 1 | 0 | 0 | 2 | 0 | 2 | X | 7 |
| (Saskatchewan) Pat Simmons | 0 | 0 | 0 | 2 | 0 | 1 | 0 | X | 3 |

| Sheet C | 1 | 2 | 3 | 4 | 5 | 6 | 7 | 8 | Final |
| (Sweden) Niklas Edin | 0 | 0 | 0 | 2 | 0 | 3 | 1 | 0 | 6 |
| (Manitoba) Mike McEwen 🔨 | 0 | 2 | 1 | 0 | 2 | 0 | 0 | 3 | 8 |

| Sheet D | 1 | 2 | 3 | 4 | 5 | 6 | 7 | 8 | Final |
| (Manitoba) Rob Fowler | 0 | 1 | 0 | 2 | 0 | 2 | 0 | 2 | 7 |
| (Alberta) Ted Appelman 🔨 | 1 | 0 | 1 | 0 | 1 | 0 | 0 | 0 | 3 |

| Sheet E | 1 | 2 | 3 | 4 | 5 | 6 | 7 | 8 | Final |
| (Manitoba) Kevin Park | 0 | 0 | 0 | 0 | 0 | 1 | X | X | 1 |
| (Newfoundland and Labrador) Brad Gushue 🔨 | 0 | 2 | 1 | 1 | 1 | 0 | X | X | 5 |

==== Draw 3 ====
Thursday, November 4, 1:30 pm

| Sheet A | 1 | 2 | 3 | 4 | 5 | 6 | 7 | 8 | Final |
| (Newfoundland and Labrador) Brad Gushue 🔨 | 1 | 1 | 0 | 2 | 0 | 3 | X | X | 7 |
| (Ontario) Jake Higgs | 0 | 0 | 1 | 0 | 1 | 0 | X | X | 2 |

| Sheet B | 1 | 2 | 3 | 4 | 5 | 6 | 7 | 8 | Final |
| (Ontario) Brad Jacobs 🔨 | 1 | 1 | 0 | 2 | 0 | 1 | 3 | X | 8 |
| (Scotland) David Murdoch | 0 | 0 | 0 | 0 | 0 | 0 | 0 | X | 0 |

| Sheet C | 1 | 2 | 3 | 4 | 5 | 6 | 7 | 8 | Final |
| (Alberta) Kevin Koe | 0 | 2 | 0 | 2 | 1 | 0 | 3 | X | 8 |
| (Ontario) Dale Matchett 🔨 | 1 | 0 | 2 | 0 | 0 | 1 | 0 | X | 4 |

| Sheet D | 1 | 2 | 3 | 4 | 5 | 6 | 7 | 8 | Final |
| (Norway) Thomas Ulsrud 🔨 | 0 | 0 | 1 | 0 | 0 | 2 | 0 | X | 3 |
| (Ontario) Wayne Middaugh | 0 | 1 | 0 | 1 | 0 | 0 | 3 | X | 5 |

| Sheet E | 1 | 2 | 3 | 4 | 5 | 6 | 7 | 8 | Final |
| (Ontario) Glenn Howard | 0 | 1 | 1 | 0 | 0 | 2 | 0 | 1 | 5 |
| (British Columbia) Bob Ursel 🔨 | 1 | 0 | 0 | 1 | 1 | 0 | 1 | 0 | 4 |

==== Draw 4 ====
Thursday, November 4, 5:00 pm

| Sheet A | 1 | 2 | 3 | 4 | 5 | 6 | 7 | 8 | Final |
| (Sweden) Niklas Edin | 1 | 1 | 0 | 0 | 0 | 0 | 1 | 0 | 3 |
| (Saskatchewan) Pat Simmons 🔨 | 0 | 0 | 1 | 1 | 1 | 1 | 0 | 1 | 5 |

| Sheet B | 1 | 2 | 3 | 4 | 5 | 6 | 7 | 8 | Final |
| (British Columbia) Bob Ursel | 2 | 0 | 2 | 1 | 0 | 0 | 0 | X | 5 |
| (Alberta) Ted Appelman 🔨 | 0 | 1 | 0 | 0 | 0 | 1 | 1 | X | 3 |

| Sheet C | 1 | 2 | 3 | 4 | 5 | 6 | 7 | 8 | 9 | Final |
| (Ontario) Jake Higgs 🔨 | 1 | 0 | 1 | 0 | 2 | 1 | 0 | 1 | 0 | 6 |
| (Manitoba) Jeff Stoughton | 0 | 1 | 0 | 3 | 0 | 0 | 2 | 0 | 1 | 7 |

| Sheet D | 1 | 2 | 3 | 4 | 5 | 6 | 7 | 8 | Final |
| (Alberta) Kevin Martin 🔨 | 2 | 0 | 0 | 0 | 2 | 0 | 0 | 2 | 6 |
| (Manitoba) Mike McEwen | 0 | 2 | 0 | 1 | 0 | 2 | 0 | 0 | 5 |

| Sheet E | 1 | 2 | 3 | 4 | 5 | 6 | 7 | 8 | Final |
| (Manitoba) Rob Fowler 🔨 | 3 | 0 | 1 | 0 | 1 | 1 | 0 | X | 6 |
| (Ontario) Wayne Middaugh | 0 | 0 | 0 | 1 | 0 | 0 | 2 | X | 3 |

==== Draw 5 ====
Thursday, November 4, 8:30pm

| Sheet A | 1 | 2 | 3 | 4 | 5 | 6 | 7 | 8 | Final |
| (Alberta) Kevin Koe | 1 | 0 | 0 | 1 | 1 | 1 | 0 | X | 4 |
| (Manitoba) Kevin Park | 0 | 1 | 0 | 0 | 0 | 0 | 0 | X | 1 |

| Sheet B | 1 | 2 | 3 | 4 | 5 | 6 | 7 | 8 | Final |
| (Ontario) Glenn Howard | 0 | 0 | 0 | 1 | 1 | 1 | 1 | 0 | 4 |
| (Norway) Thomas Ulsrud 🔨 | 0 | 2 | 1 | 0 | 0 | 0 | 0 | 2 | 5 |

| Sheet C | 1 | 2 | 3 | 4 | 5 | 6 | 7 | 8 | Final |
| (Alberta) Kevin Martin 🔨 | 0 | 0 | 4 | 0 | 0 | 2 | 0 | X | 6 |
| (Scotland) David Murdoch | 0 | 0 | 0 | 0 | 0 | 0 | 1 | X | 1 |

| Sheet D | 1 | 2 | 3 | 4 | 5 | 6 | 7 | 8 | Final |
| (Newfoundland and Labrador) Brad Gushue | 0 | 1 | 0 | 2 | 0 | 0 | 0 | 1 | 4 |
| (Manitoba) Jeff Stoughton | 3 | 0 | 1 | 0 | 0 | 1 | 1 | 0 | 6 |

| Sheet E | 1 | 2 | 3 | 4 | 5 | 6 | 7 | 8 | Final |
| (Saskatchewan) Pat Simmons | 0 | 1 | 0 | 1 | 0 | 2 | 0 | X | 4 |
| (Ontario) Brad Jacobs 🔨 | 3 | 0 | 1 | 0 | 2 | 0 | 2 | X | 8 |

==== Draw 6 ====
Friday, November 5, 10:00 am

| Sheet A | 1 | 2 | 3 | 4 | 5 | 6 | 7 | 8 | Final |
| (Alberta) Ted Appelman | 0 | 0 | 0 | 1 | 1 | 0 | 0 | X | 2 |
| (Ontario) Wayne Middaugh 🔨 | 2 | 3 | 0 | 0 | 0 | 1 | 1 | X | 7 |

| Sheet B | 1 | 2 | 3 | 4 | 5 | 6 | 7 | 8 | Final |
| (Newfoundland and Labrador) Brad Gushue 🔨 | 1 | 0 | 2 | 0 | 2 | 0 | 1 | 1 | 7 |
| (Ontario) Dale Matchett | 0 | 2 | 0 | 3 | 0 | 1 | 0 | 0 | 6 |

| Sheet C | 1 | 2 | 3 | 4 | 5 | 6 | 7 | 8 | Final |
| (British Columbia) Bob Ursel | 0 | 3 | 0 | 2 | 0 | 0 | 1 | X | 6 |
| (Manitoba) Rob Fowler 🔨 | 1 | 0 | 1 | 0 | 1 | 0 | 0 | X | 3 |

| Sheet D | 1 | 2 | 3 | 4 | 5 | 6 | 7 | 8 | Final |
| (Saskatchewan) Pat Simmons | 2 | 0 | 2 | 0 | 2 | 0 | 3 | X | 9 |
| (Scotland) David Murdoch | 0 | 1 | 0 | 1 | 0 | 1 | 0 | X | 3 |

| Sheet E | 1 | 2 | 3 | 4 | 5 | 6 | 7 | 8 | 9 | Final |
| (Manitoba) Kevin Park | 0 | 0 | 3 | 0 | 2 | 1 | 0 | 0 | 1 | 7 |
| (Ontario) Jake Higgs 🔨 | 1 | 0 | 0 | 3 | 0 | 0 | 1 | 1 | 0 | 6 |

==== Draw 7 ====
Friday, November 5, 1:30 pm

| Sheet A | 1 | 2 | 3 | 4 | 5 | 6 | 7 | 8 | Final |
| (Ontario) Glenn Howard | 0 | 2 | 0 | 1 | 0 | 1 | 0 | X | 4 |
| (Manitoba) Rob Fowler 🔨 | 2 | 0 | 2 | 0 | 3 | 0 | 4 | X | 11 |

| Sheet B | 1 | 2 | 3 | 4 | 5 | 6 | 7 | 8 | Final |
| (Alberta) Kevin Koe | 0 | 2 | 0 | 0 | 1 | 0 | 1 | 1 | 5 |
| (Manitoba) Jeff Stoughton 🔨 | 2 | 0 | 2 | 0 | 0 | 2 | 0 | 0 | 6 |

| Sheet C | 1 | 2 | 3 | 4 | 5 | 6 | 7 | 8 | Final |
| (Norway) Thomas Ulsrud | 1 | 0 | 0 | 0 | 0 | 5 | 0 | X | 6 |
| (Alberta) Ted Appelman 🔨 | 0 | 2 | 1 | 0 | 0 | 0 | 0 | X | 3 |

| Sheet D | 1 | 2 | 3 | 4 | 5 | 6 | 7 | 8 | Final |
| (Ontario) Brad Jacobs 🔨 | 0 | 1 | 0 | 0 | 1 | 0 | 1 | X | 3 |
| (Manitoba) Mike McEwen | 0 | 0 | 1 | 3 | 0 | 2 | 0 | X | 6 |

| Sheet E | 1 | 2 | 3 | 4 | 5 | 6 | 7 | 8 | Final |
| (Sweden) Niklas Edin | 0 | 0 | 2 | 0 | 1 | 0 | 2 | 2 | 7 |
| (Alberta) Kevin Martin 🔨 | 1 | 0 | 0 | 2 | 0 | 1 | 0 | 0 | 4 |

==== Draw 8 ====
Friday, November 5, 5:00 pm

| Sheet A | 1 | 2 | 3 | 4 | 5 | 6 | 7 | 8 | Final |
| (Manitoba) Mike McEwen | 1 | 0 | 1 | 0 | 0 | 2 | 0 | 1 | 5 |
| (Saskatchewan) Pat Simmons 🔨 | 0 | 1 | 0 | 2 | 0 | 0 | 3 | 0 | 6 |

| Sheet B | 1 | 2 | 3 | 4 | 5 | 6 | 7 | 8 | Final |
| (British Columbia) Bob Ursel 🔨 | 2 | 0 | 2 | 0 | 0 | 0 | 1 | 0 | 5 |
| (Ontario) Wayne Middaugh | 0 | 1 | 0 | 2 | 1 | 1 | 0 | 1 | 6 |

| Sheet C | 1 | 2 | 3 | 4 | 5 | 6 | 7 | 8 | Final |
| (Sweden) Niklas Edin | 0 | 3 | 0 | 2 | 0 | 0 | 3 | X | 8 |
| (Scotland) David Murdoch 🔨 | 1 | 0 | 1 | 0 | 1 | 0 | 0 | X | 3 |

| Sheet D | 1 | 2 | 3 | 4 | 5 | 6 | 7 | 8 | Final |
| (Manitoba) Kevin Park 🔨 | 5 | 1 | 0 | 2 | 0 | X | X | X | 8 |
| (Ontario) Dale Matchett | 0 | 0 | 0 | 0 | 1 | X | X | X | 1 |

| Sheet E | 1 | 2 | 3 | 4 | 5 | 6 | 7 | 8 | Final |
| (Alberta) Kevin Koe | 0 | 1 | 1 | 1 | 0 | 5 | X | X | 8 |
| (Newfoundland and Labrador) Brad Gushue | 1 | 0 | 0 | 0 | 1 | 0 | X | X | 2 |

==== Draw 9 ====
Friday, November 5, 8:30 pm

| Sheet A | 1 | 2 | 3 | 4 | 5 | 6 | 7 | 8 | Final |
| (Ontario) Brad Jacobs | 0 | 0 | 1 | 0 | 0 | 2 | 0 | X | 3 |
| (Alberta) Kevin Martin 🔨 | 0 | 3 | 0 | 1 | 1 | 0 | 1 | X | 6 |

| Sheet B | 1 | 2 | 3 | 4 | 5 | 6 | 7 | 8 | Final |
| (Ontario) Glenn Howard | 0 | 2 | 1 | 0 | 1 | 1 | 0 | 1 | 6 |
| (Alberta) Ted Appelman | 1 | 0 | 0 | 2 | 0 | 0 | 1 | 0 | 4 |

| Sheet C | 1 | 2 | 3 | 4 | 5 | 6 | 7 | 8 | Final |
| (Manitoba) Kevin Park | 2 | 0 | 0 | 0 | 0 | 0 | 1 | 0 | 3 |
| (Manitoba) Jeff Stoughton 🔨 | 0 | 1 | 1 | 1 | 0 | 0 | 0 | 1 | 4 |

| Sheet D | 1 | 2 | 3 | 4 | 5 | 6 | 7 | 8 | Final |
| (Norway) Thomas Ulsrud | 0 | 0 | 1 | 0 | 1 | 0 | X | X | 2 |
| (Manitoba) Rob Fowler | 1 | 2 | 0 | 1 | 0 | 3 | X | X | 7 |

| Sheet E | 1 | 2 | 3 | 4 | 5 | 6 | 7 | 8 | Final |
| (Ontario) Jake Higgs 🔨 | 0 | 2 | 3 | 4 | 0 | X | X | X | 9 |
| (Ontario) Dale Matchett | 1 | 0 | 0 | 0 | 1 | X | X | X | 2 |

=== Tiebreakers ===
Saturday, November 6, 11:00 am

| Team | 1 | 2 | 3 | 4 | 5 | 6 | 7 | 8 | 9 | Final |
| (Alberta) Kevin Koe 🔨 | 0 | 0 | 1 | 0 | 0 | 4 | 0 | 0 | 1 | 6 |
| (Ontario) Wayne Middaugh | 0 | 0 | 0 | 2 | 1 | 0 | 1 | 1 | 0 | 5 |

| Team | 1 | 2 | 3 | 4 | 5 | 6 | 7 | 8 | Final |
| (Saskatchewan) Pat Simmons 🔨 | 1 | 0 | 1 | 1 | 0 | 0 | 1 | 0 | 4 |
| (Newfoundland and Labrador) Brad Gushue | 0 | 1 | 0 | 0 | 1 | 2 | 0 | 1 | 5 |

| Team | 1 | 2 | 3 | 4 | 5 | 6 | 7 | 8 | Final |
| (Norway) Thomas Ulsrud 🔨 | 0 | 2 | 0 | 2 | 0 | 2 | 0 | 0 | 6 |
| (Manitoba) Mike McEwen | 1 | 0 | 2 | 0 | 1 | 0 | 2 | 1 | 7 |

== Playoffs ==
Quarterfinals; Saturday, 3:00 pm
(Manitoba) Jeff Stoughton | 5
(Newfoundland and Labrador) Brad Gushue | 4
(Sweden) Niklas Edin | 5
(Ontario) Glenn Howard | 6
(Alberta) Kevin Martin | 3
(Manitoba) Mike McEwen | 8
(Manitoba) Rob Fowler | 5
(Alberta) Kevin Koe | 3

Semifinals; Saturday, 7:00 pm
(Manitoba) Jeff Stoughton | 6
(Ontario) Glenn Howard | 4
(Manitoba) Mike McEwen | 7
(Manitoba) Rob Fowler | 2

Finals; Sunday, 1:00 pm
(Manitoba) Jeff Stoughton | 2
(Manitoba) Mike McEwen | 4

=== Quarterfinals ===
Saturday, November 6, 3:00 pm

| Sheet A | 1 | 2 | 3 | 4 | 5 | 6 | 7 | 8 | Final |
| (Manitoba) Jeff Stoughton 🔨 | 1 | 0 | 2 | 0 | 0 | 1 | 0 | 1 | 5 |
| (Newfoundland and Labrador) Brad Gushue | 0 | 1 | 0 | 0 | 2 | 0 | 1 | 0 | 4 |

| Sheet B | 1 | 2 | 3 | 4 | 5 | 6 | 7 | 8 | Final |
| (Sweden) Niklas Edin | 1 | 0 | 2 | 0 | 0 | 0 | 2 | 0 | 5 |
| (Ontario) Glenn Howard 🔨 | 0 | 2 | 0 | 2 | 0 | 0 | 0 | 2 | 6 |

| Sheet D | 1 | 2 | 3 | 4 | 5 | 6 | 7 | 8 | Final |
| (Alberta) Kevin Martin 🔨 | 0 | 0 | 3 | 0 | 0 | X | X | X | 3 |
| (Manitoba) Mike McEwen | 0 | 4 | 0 | 3 | 1 | X | X | X | 8 |

| Sheet E | 1 | 2 | 3 | 4 | 5 | 6 | 7 | 8 | Final |
| (Manitoba) Rob Fowler 🔨 | 1 | 0 | 0 | 2 | 0 | 2 | 0 | X | 5 |
| (Alberta) Kevin Koe | 0 | 0 | 1 | 0 | 2 | 0 | 0 | X | 3 |

=== Semifinals ===
Saturday, November 6, 7:00 pm

| Sheet B | 1 | 2 | 3 | 4 | 5 | 6 | 7 | 8 | Final |
| (Manitoba) Jeff Stoughton 🔨 | 1 | 0 | 1 | 0 | 1 | 0 | 0 | 3 | 6 |
| (Ontario) Glenn Howard | 0 | 1 | 0 | 2 | 0 | 1 | 0 | 0 | 4 |

| Sheet D | 1 | 2 | 3 | 4 | 5 | 6 | 7 | 8 | Final |
| (Manitoba) Mike McEwen | 2 | 0 | 3 | 0 | 2 | X | X | X | 7 |
| (Manitoba) Rob Fowler 🔨 | 0 | 2 | 0 | 0 | 0 | X | X | X | 2 |

=== Final ===
Sunday, November 7, 1:00 pm

| Sheet C | 1 | 2 | 3 | 4 | 5 | 6 | 7 | 8 | Final |
| (Manitoba) Jeff Stoughton (Note: Greg Balsdon filled in for Jon Mead, who was unavailable for the final.) 🔨 | 0 | 0 | 1 | 0 | 1 | 0 | 0 | 0 | 2 |
| (Manitoba) Mike McEwen | 0 | 1 | 0 | 1 | 0 | 0 | 1 | 1 | 4 |
