= 2014 The National =

2014 The National may refer to one of the following:

- 2014 The National (March), the Grand Slam held in March 2014 as part of the 2013–14 curling season
- 2014 The National (November), the Grand Slam to be held in November 2014 as part of the 2014–15 curling season
