= 2018 Elite 10 (March) =

Grand Slam of Curling event

2018 Princess Auto Elite 10
- Host city: Winnipeg, Manitoba
- Arena: St. James Civic Centre
- Dates: March 15–18
- Winner: (Manitoba) Mike McEwen
- Curling club: Fort Rouge CC, Winnipeg
- Skip: Mike McEwen
- Third: B.J. Neufeld
- Second: Matt Wozniak
- Lead: Denni Neufeld
- Finalist: (Newfoundland and Labrador) Brad Gushue

The 2018 Princess Auto Elite 10 was held from March 15 to 18 at St. James Civic Centre in Winnipeg, Manitoba. It was the fifth Grand Slam of Curling event held in the 2017–18 curling season. The tournament was held between ten men's teams.

== Format ==
Instead of normal curling scoring rules, the Elite 10 uses a match play system in which scoring is based on ends won, rather than rocks scored. An end is won by stealing or scoring two with the hammer, similar to skins curling. Unlike skins, however, there are no carry-overs. In the event of a tie, a draw to the button competition is held to determine the winner. In the standings, wins are worth three points, draw to the button wins are worth two points, and draw to the button losses are worth one point.

== Teams ==
The top 10 teams in the World Curling Tour's year-to-date rankings as of February 5, 2018, were invited to compete in the Elite 10. If any teams declined, the next-highest team was invited until the field of 10 teams was complete.

Skip	Third	Second	Lead	Locale
Reid Carruthers	Jeff Stoughton	Derek Samagalski	Colin Hodgson	Winnipeg, Manitoba
Niklas Edin	Oskar Eriksson	Rasmus Wranå	Christoffer Sundgren	Karlstad, Sweden
John Epping	Mat Camm	Patrick Janssen	Tim March	Toronto, Ontario
Jason Gunnlaugson	Alex Forrest	Ian McMillan	Connor Njegovan	Winnipeg, Manitoba
Brad Gushue	Mark Nichols	Brett Gallant	Geoff Walker	St. John's, Newfoundland and Labrador
Glenn Howard	Adam Spencer	David Mathers	Scott Howard	Tiny, Ontario
Brad Jacobs	Ryan Fry	E. J. Harnden	Ryan Harnden	Sault Ste. Marie, Ontario
Kevin Koe	Marc Kennedy	Brent Laing	Ben Hebert	Calgary, Alberta
Mike McEwen	B. J. Neufeld	Matt Wozniak	Denni Neufeld	Winnipeg, Manitoba
John Shuster	Tyler George	Matt Hamilton	John Landsteiner	Duluth, United States

== Round-robin standings ==
Pool A	W	EEW	EEL	L	EF	EA	Pts
(Newfoundland and Labrador) Brad Gushue	2	1	0	1	13	8	8
(Ontario) Glenn Howard	2	0	1	1	12	12	7
(Ontario) John Epping	2	0	0	2	12	9	6
(Sweden) Niklas Edin	1	1	1	1	12	14	6
(Manitoba) Reid Carruthers	0	1	1	2	8	14	3

Pool B	W	EEW	EEL	L	EF	EA	Pts
(Manitoba) Mike McEwen	4	0	0	0	16	4	12
(Alberta) Kevin Koe	3	0	0	1	12	8	9
(Ontario) Brad Jacobs	2	0	0	2	10	8	6
(United States) John Shuster	1	0	0	3	7	14	3
(Manitoba) Jason Gunnlaugson	0	0	0	4	3	13	0

== Round-robin results ==
All draw times are listed in Central Standard Time (UTC-6).

=== Draw 1 ===
Thursday, March 15, 12:00 pm

Sheet A	1	2	3	4	5	6	7	8	Final
(Ontario) John Epping			✓	✓	✓	✓	X	X	4
(Sweden) Niklas Edin 🔨		✓					X	X	1

Sheet B	1	2	3	4	5	6	7	8	Final
(Manitoba) Jason Gunnlaugson					✓		X	X	1
(United States) John Shuster 🔨	✓		✓	✓		✓	X	X	4

Sheet C	1	2	3	4	5	6	7	8	9	Final
(Manitoba) Reid Carruthers 🔨		✓	✓			✓			✓	4
(Ontario) Glenn Howard				✓	✓		✓			3

=== Draw 2 ===
Thursday, March 15, 4:00 pm

Sheet A	1	2	3	4	5	6	7	8	Final
(Ontario) Glenn Howard 🔨	✓	✓				✓			3
(Newfoundland and Labrador) Brad Gushue					✓		✓		2

Sheet B	1	2	3	4	5	6	7	8	Final
(Alberta) Kevin Koe				✓				X	1
(Manitoba) Mike McEwen 🔨			✓		✓	✓		X	3

Sheet C	1	2	3	4	5	6	7	8	Final
(United States) John Shuster					✓			X	1
(Ontario) Brad Jacobs 🔨	✓		✓			✓	✓	X	4

=== Draw 3 ===
Thursday, March 15, 8:00 pm

Sheet A	1	2	3	4	5	6	7	8	Final
(Manitoba) Mike McEwen 🔨	✓	✓	✓	✓	✓	X	X	X	5
(Manitoba) Jason Gunnlaugson						X	X	X	0

Sheet B	1	2	3	4	5	6	7	8	Final
(Ontario) John Epping	✓		✓		✓	✓	X	X	4
(Manitoba) Reid Carruthers 🔨		✓					X	X	1

Sheet C	1	2	3	4	5	6	7	8	9	Final
(Sweden) Niklas Edin		✓	✓					✓		3
(Newfoundland and Labrador) Brad Gushue 🔨				✓	✓		✓		✓	4

=== Draw 4 ===
Friday, March 16, 8:30 am

Sheet A	1	2	3	4	5	6	7	8	Final
(Sweden) Niklas Edin	✓				✓		✓	✓	4
(Ontario) Glenn Howard 🔨			✓	✓		✓			3

Sheet B	1	2	3	4	5	6	7	8	Final
(Manitoba) Mike McEwen				✓		✓		✓	3
(Ontario) Brad Jacobs 🔨			✓		✓				2

Sheet C	1	2	3	4	5	6	7	8	Final
(Manitoba) Jason Gunnlaugson				✓	✓				2
(Alberta) Kevin Koe 🔨	✓					✓		✓	3

=== Draw 5 ===
Friday, March 16, 12:00 pm

Sheet A	1	2	3	4	5	6	7	8	Final
(Alberta) Kevin Koe			✓		✓	✓		✓	4
(Ontario) Brad Jacobs 🔨		✓		✓					2

Sheet B	1	2	3	4	5	6	7	8	Final
(Newfoundland and Labrador) Brad Gushue		✓	✓		✓			✓	4
(Ontario) John Epping 🔨						✓	✓		2

=== Draw 6 ===
Friday, March 16, 4:00 pm

Sheet A	1	2	3	4	5	6	7	8	Final
(United States) John Shuster 🔨			✓				X	X	1
(Manitoba) Mike McEwen	✓	✓		✓	✓	✓	X	X	5

Sheet B	1	2	3	4	5	6	7	8	9	Final
(Manitoba) Reid Carruthers		✓		✓				✓		3
(Sweden) Niklas Edin 🔨	✓		✓				✓		✓	4

Sheet C	1	2	3	4	5	6	7	8	Final
(Ontario) Glenn Howard	✓	✓					✓		3
(Ontario) John Epping 🔨			✓		✓				2

=== Draw 7 ===
Friday, March 16, 8:00 pm

Sheet A	1	2	3	4	5	6	7	8	Final
(Newfoundland and Labrador) Brad Gushue			✓	✓		✓	X	X	3
(Manitoba) Reid Carruthers 🔨							X	X	0

Sheet B	1	2	3	4	5	6	7	8	Final
(United States) John Shuster				✓				X	1
(Alberta) Kevin Koe 🔨	✓		✓			✓	✓	X	4

Sheet C	1	2	3	4	5	6	7	8	Final
(Ontario) Brad Jacobs						✓	✓	X	2
(Manitoba) Jason Gunnlaugson 🔨								X	0

=== Tiebreaker ===
Saturday, March 17, 8:30 am

Team	1	2	3	4	5	6	7	8	Final
(Sweden) Niklas Edin 🔨						X	X	X	0
(Ontario) John Epping	✓		✓	✓	✓	X	X	X	4

== Playoffs ==
Quarterfinals
(Ontario) Glenn Howard	3
(Ontario) Brad Jacobs	1
(Newfoundland and Labrador) Brad Gushue	4
(Ontario) John Epping	2

Semifinals
(Manitoba) Mike McEwen	4
(Ontario) Glenn Howard	3
(Alberta) Kevin Koe	1
(Newfoundland and Labrador) Brad Gushue	2

Final
(Manitoba) Mike McEwen	4
(Newfoundland and Labrador) Brad Gushue	1

=== Quarterfinals ===
Saturday, March 17, 12:00 pm

Team	1	2	3	4	5	6	7	8	Final
(Ontario) Glenn Howard		✓		✓			✓	X	3
(Ontario) Brad Jacobs 🔨	✓							X	1

Player percentages
(Ontario) Glenn Howard		(Ontario) Brad Jacobs	
Scott Howard	97%	Ryan Harnden	88%
David Mathers	84%	E. J. Harnden	74%
Adam Spencer	100%	Ryan Fry	76%
Glenn Howard	97%	Brad Jacobs	73%
Total	94%	Total	78%

Team	1	2	3	4	5	6	7	8	Final
(Newfoundland and Labrador) Brad Gushue		✓	✓		✓		✓	X	4
(Ontario) John Epping 🔨	✓			✓				X	2

Player percentages
(Newfoundland and Labrador) Brad Gushue		(Ontario) John Epping	
Geoff Walker	86%	Tim March	94%
Brett Gallant	91%	Patrick Janssen	93%
Mark Nichols	95%	Mat Camm	83%
Brad Gushue	93%	John Epping	71%
Total	91%	Total	85%

=== Semifinals ===
Saturday, March 17, 4:00 pm

Team	1	2	3	4	5	6	7	8	Final
(Ontario) Glenn Howard 🔨	✓		✓			✓			3
(Manitoba) Mike McEwen		✓		✓	✓		✓		4

Player percentages
(Ontario) Glenn Howard		(Manitoba) Mike McEwen	
Scott Howard	69%	Denni Neufeld	90%
David Mathers	94%	Matt Wozniak	94%
Adam Spencer	89%	B.J. Neufeld	75%
Glenn Howard	63%	Mike McEwen	86%
Total	79%	Total	86%

Team	1	2	3	4	5	6	7	8	Final
(Alberta) Kevin Koe 🔨					✓				1
(Newfoundland and Labrador) Brad Gushue	✓	✓							2

Player percentages
(Alberta) Kevin Koe		(Newfoundland and Labrador) Brad Gushue	
Ben Hebert	87%	Geoff Walker	80%
Brent Laing	83%	Brett Gallant	81%
Marc Kennedy	74%	Mark Nichols	89%
Kevin Koe	76%	Brad Gushue	76%
Total	80%	Total	81%

=== Final ===
Sunday March 18, 9:30 am

Team	1	2	3	4	5	6	7	8	Final
(Manitoba) Mike McEwen	✓	✓		✓			✓	X	4
(Newfoundland and Labrador) Brad Gushue 🔨					✓			X	1

Player percentages
(Manitoba) Mike McEwen		(Newfoundland and Labrador) Brad Gushue	
Denni Neufeld	90%	Geoff Walker	88%
Matt Wozniak	92%	Brett Gallant	71%
B.J. Neufeld	98%	Mark Nichols	79%
Mike McEwen	79%	Brad Gushue	56%
Total	90%	Total	74%
