= 2014 The National (November) =

Grand Slam of Curling event

- Host city: Sault Ste. Marie, Ontario
- Arena: Essar Centre
- Dates: November 19–23
- Winner: (Manitoba) Mike McEwen
- Curling club: Fort Rouge CC, Winnipeg, MB
- Skip: Mike McEwen
- Third: B.J. Neufeld
- Second: Matt Wozniak
- Lead: Denni Neufeld
- Finalist: (Ontario) Brad Jacobs

The 2014 The National in November was held from November 19 to 23 at the Essar Centre in Sault Ste. Marie, Ontario as part of the 2014–15 World Curling Tour. The National was the second men's Grand Slam event of the season.

== Teams ==
The teams are listed as follows:

Skip	Third	Second	Lead	Locale
Matthew Blandford	Darren Moulding	Brent Hamilton	Brad Chyz	Calgary, Alberta
Brendan Bottcher	Tom Appelman	Bradley Thiessen	Karrick Martin	Edmonton, Alberta
Reid Carruthers	Braeden Moskowy	Derek Samagalski	Colin Hodgson	Winnipeg, Manitoba
Adam Casey	Josh Barry	Anson Carmody	Robbie Doherty	Charlottetown, Prince Edward Island
Benoît Schwarz (fourth)	Claudio Pätz	Peter de Cruz (skip)	Valentin Tanner	Geneva, Switzerland
John Epping	Travis Fanset	Patrick Janssen	Tim March	Toronto, Ontario
Brad Gushue	Mark Nichols	Brett Gallant	Geoff Walker	Newfoundland and Labrador
Glenn Howard	Richard Hart	Jon Mead	Craig Savill	Penetanguishene, Ontario
Brad Jacobs	Ryan Fry	E. J. Harnden	Ryan Harnden	Sault Ste. Marie, Ontario
Mark Kean	Mathew Camm	David Mathers	Scott Howard	Toronto, Ontario
Kevin Koe	Marc Kennedy	Brent Laing	Ben Hebert	Calgary, Alberta
Steve Laycock	Kirk Muyres	Colton Flasch	Dallan Muyres	Saskatoon, Saskatchewan
Heath McCormick	Christopher Plys	Joe Polo	Ryan Brunt	(United States) Blaine, Minnesota
Mike McEwen	B. J. Neufeld	Matt Wozniak	Denni Neufeld	Winnipeg, Manitoba
John Morris	Pat Simmons	Scott Bailey	Nolan Thiessen	Calgary, Alberta
Rob Rumfeldt	Adam Spencer	Brad Kidd	Jake Higgs	Guelph, Ontario
John Shuster	Tyler George	Matt Hamilton	John Landsteiner	(United States) Duluth, Minnesota
Jeff Stoughton	Rob Fowler	Alex Forrest	Connor Njegovan	Winnipeg, Manitoba

== Round-robin standings ==
Final round-robin standings

Key
Teams to Playoffs

Pool A	W	L
(Ontario) Glenn Howard	5	0
(Ontario) Brad Jacobs	3	2
(Alberta) Matthew Blandford	2	3
(Ontario) John Epping	2	3
(Prince Edward Island) Adam Casey	2	3
(Ontario) Mark Kean	1	4

Pool B	W	L
(Manitoba) Reid Carruthers	5	0
(Alberta) Brendan Bottcher	4	1
(Switzerland) Peter de Cruz	2	3
(Newfoundland and Labrador) Brad Gushue	2	3
(Alberta) Kevin Koe	2	3
(Ontario) Rob Rumfeldt	0	5

Pool C	W	L
(Saskatchewan) Steve Laycock	3	2
(United States) Heath McCormick	3	2
(Manitoba) Mike McEwen	3	2
(Alberta) John Morris	3	2
(Manitoba) Jeff Stoughton	2	3
(United States) John Shuster	1	4

== Round-robin results ==
The draw is listed as follows:

=== Draw 1 ===
Wednesday, November 19, 7:00 pm

Sheet A	1	2	3	4	5	6	7	8	Final
(Ontario) Brad Jacobs	3	0	1	0	2	0	3	X	9
(Ontario) Mark Kean 🔨	0	1	0	1	0	1	0	X	3

Sheet B	1	2	3	4	5	6	7	8	Final
(Ontario) Glenn Howard 🔨	3	0	2	0	1	0	2	X	8
(Prince Edward Island) Adam Casey	0	1	0	1	0	2	0	X	4

Sheet C	1	2	3	4	5	6	7	8	Final
(Alberta) Kevin Koe 🔨	2	0	1	0	1	0	1	1	6
(Switzerland) Peter de Cruz	0	1	0	2	0	0	0	0	3

Sheet D	1	2	3	4	5	6	7	8	Final
(Manitoba) Jeff Stoughton	0	2	0	1	1	1	2	X	7
(United States) John Shuster 🔨	2	0	1	0	0	0	0	X	3

Sheet E	1	2	3	4	5	6	7	8	Final
(Manitoba) Mike McEwen 🔨	2	0	3	1	1	0	0	X	7
(United States) Heath McCormick	0	1	0	0	0	2	1	X	4

=== Draw 2 ===
Thursday, November 20, 9:00 am

Sheet A	1	2	3	4	5	6	7	8	9	Final
(Ontario) John Epping	0	1	2	0	2	0	0	0	2	7
(Alberta) Matthew Blandford 🔨	1	0	0	1	0	1	1	1	0	5

Sheet B	1	2	3	4	5	6	7	8	9	Final
(United States) John Shuster 🔨	2	0	1	1	1	0	0	0	0	5
(United States) Heath McCormick	0	1	0	0	0	2	1	1	1	6

Sheet C	1	2	3	4	5	6	7	8	Final
(Alberta) John Morris	0	1	0	0	0	1	0	X	2
(Saskatchewan) Steve Laycock 🔨	2	0	2	1	1	0	1	X	7

Sheet D	1	2	3	4	5	6	7	8	Final
(Newfoundland and Labrador) Brad Gushue 🔨	0	0	1	1	0	2	0	0	4
(Alberta) Brendan Bottcher	0	2	0	0	3	0	1	1	7

Sheet E	1	2	3	4	5	6	7	8	Final
(Manitoba) Reid Carruthers 🔨	0	2	0	2	2	X	X	X	6
(Ontario) Rob Rumfeldt	0	0	1	0	0	X	X	X	1

=== Draw 3 ===
Thursday, November 20, 12:30 pm

Sheet A	1	2	3	4	5	6	7	8	Final
(Saskatchewan) Steve Laycock	0	0	1	1	0	3	0	2	7
(United States) John Shuster 🔨	3	1	0	0	4	0	0	0	8

Sheet B	1	2	3	4	5	6	7	8	Final
(Alberta) Kevin Koe	1	0	0	1	0	0	2	0	4
(Alberta) Brendan Bottcher 🔨	0	2	1	0	1	1	0	1	6

Sheet C	1	2	3	4	5	6	7	8	9	Final
(Ontario) Brad Jacobs	0	0	1	0	0	2	0	1	0	4
(Prince Edward Island) Adam Casey 🔨	0	2	0	1	0	0	1	0	1	5

Sheet D	1	2	3	4	5	6	7	8	Final
(Switzerland) Peter de Cruz	0	1	0	0	2	0	X	X	3
(Manitoba) Reid Carruthers 🔨	2	0	2	0	0	5	X	X	5

Sheet E	1	2	3	4	5	6	7	8	Final
(Ontario) Glenn Howard	0	1	1	0	0	0	2	2	6
(Ontario) Mark Kean 🔨	2	0	0	1	0	2	0	0	5

=== Draw 4 ===
Thursday, November 20, 4:00 pm

Sheet A	1	2	3	4	5	6	7	8	Final
(Newfoundland and Labrador) Brad Gushue 🔨	2	0	2	1	0	3	X	X	8
(Ontario) Rob Rumfeldt	0	1	0	0	2	0	X	X	3

Sheet B	1	2	3	4	5	6	7	8	Final
(Alberta) Matthew Blandford	0	2	1	0	1	0	0	1	5
(Ontario) Mark Kean 🔨	1	0	0	1	0	1	1	0	4

Sheet C	1	2	3	4	5	6	7	8	9	Final
(Manitoba) Mike McEwen	0	0	2	1	1	0	1	0	2	7
(Manitoba) Jeff Stoughton 🔨	1	1	0	0	0	1	0	2	0	5

Sheet D	1	2	3	4	5	6	7	8	Final
(Alberta) John Morris	0	1	0	0	2	0	1	0	4
(United States) Heath McCormick 🔨	0	0	0	2	0	2	0	1	5

Sheet E	1	2	3	4	5	6	7	8	9	Final
(Ontario) John Epping	0	0	0	0	1	0	3	0	1	5
(Prince Edward Island) Adam Casey 🔨	1	0	0	1	0	1	0	1	0	4

=== Draw 5 ===
Thursday, November 20, 7:30 pm

Sheet A	1	2	3	4	5	6	7	8	Final
(Alberta) Kevin Koe	0	0	0	1	1	0	0	2	4
(Manitoba) Reid Carruthers 🔨	0	1	1	0	0	2	1	0	5

Sheet B	1	2	3	4	5	6	7	8	Final
(Ontario) Brad Jacobs 🔨	1	0	1	0	0	1	1	0	4
(Ontario) Glenn Howard	0	2	0	0	2	0	0	1	5

Sheet C	1	2	3	4	5	6	7	8	Final
(Alberta) Brendan Bottcher 🔨	0	1	0	3	0	2	0	1	7
(Switzerland) Peter de Cruz	0	0	1	0	3	0	1	0	5

Sheet D	1	2	3	4	5	6	7	8	Final
(Manitoba) Jeff Stoughton	0	1	0	3	0	0	3	0	7
(Saskatchewan) Steve Laycock 🔨	1	0	2	0	0	2	0	1	6

Sheet E	1	2	3	4	5	6	7	8	Final
(Alberta) John Morris	0	1	1	0	1	0	1	3	7
(Manitoba) Mike McEwen 🔨	2	0	0	1	0	0	0	0	3

=== Draw 6 ===
Friday, November 21, 9:00 am

Sheet A	1	2	3	4	5	6	7	8	Final
(Manitoba) Mike McEwen 🔨	1	2	0	3	0	0	1	X	7
(United States) John Shuster	0	0	1	0	2	1	0	X	4

Sheet B	1	2	3	4	5	6	7	8	Final
(Ontario) Rob Rumfeldt	0	0	0	2	1	0	2	0	5
(Alberta) Brendan Bottcher 🔨	0	3	2	0	0	1	0	1	7

Sheet C	1	2	3	4	5	6	7	8	Final
(Alberta) Matthew Blandford 🔨	0	1	1	0	3	0	0	X	5
(Prince Edward Island) Adam Casey	0	0	0	1	0	1	0	X	2

Sheet D	1	2	3	4	5	6	7	8	Final
(Ontario) John Epping	0	0	2	0	2	0	2	0	6
(Ontario) Mark Kean 🔨	0	2	0	3	0	2	0	1	8

Sheet E	1	2	3	4	5	6	7	8	Final
(Newfoundland and Labrador) Brad Gushue	0	1	0	0	2	1	0	X	4
(Manitoba) Reid Carruthers 🔨	0	0	3	1	0	0	2	X	6

=== Draw 7 ===
Friday, November 21, 12:00 pm

Sheet A	1	2	3	4	5	6	7	8	Final
(Saskatchewan) Steve Laycock	0	1	0	2	0	1	2	0	6
(United States) Heath McCormick 🔨	1	0	1	0	2	0	0	1	5

Sheet B	1	2	3	4	5	6	7	8	Final
(Newfoundland and Labrador) Brad Gushue	0	0	1	1	0	X	X	X	2
(Switzerland) Peter de Cruz 🔨	2	3	0	0	4	X	X	X	9

Sheet C	1	2	3	4	5	6	7	8	Final
(Ontario) John Epping	1	0	0	2	0	2	0	X	5
(Ontario) Glenn Howard 🔨	0	1	1	0	3	0	3	X	8

Sheet D	1	2	3	4	5	6	7	8	Final
(Alberta) John Morris 🔨	3	3	0	2	2	X	X	X	10
(United States) John Shuster	0	0	2	0	0	X	X	X	2

Sheet E	1	2	3	4	5	6	7	8	Final
(Alberta) Kevin Koe	1	0	0	2	0	0	3	X	6
(Ontario) Rob Rumfeldt 🔨	0	0	2	0	1	0	0	X	3

=== Draw 8 ===
Friday, November 21, 3:30 pm

Sheet A	1	2	3	4	5	6	7	8	Final
(Prince Edward Island) Adam Casey 🔨	0	1	0	3	3	2	X	X	9
(Ontario) Mark Kean	1	0	1	0	0	0	X	X	2

Sheet B	1	2	3	4	5	6	7	8	Final
(Manitoba) Jeff Stoughton 🔨	0	1	0	1	0	2	0	X	4
(United States) Heath McCormick	0	0	3	0	2	0	2	X	7

Sheet C	1	2	3	4	5	6	7	8	Final
(Manitoba) Reid Carruthers 🔨	1	3	2	0	3	X	X	X	9
(Alberta) Brendan Bottcher	0	0	0	2	0	X	X	X	2

Sheet D	1	2	3	4	5	6	7	8	Final
(Manitoba) Mike McEwen 🔨	2	0	2	0	0	1	0	X	5
(Saskatchewan) Steve Laycock	0	2	0	3	0	0	4	X	9

Sheet E	1	2	3	4	5	6	7	8	Final
(Ontario) Brad Jacobs 🔨	0	0	0	0	2	0	1	1	4
(Alberta) Matthew Blandford	0	1	0	1	0	1	0	0	3

=== Draw 9 ===
Friday, November 21, 7:30 pm

Sheet A	1	2	3	4	5	6	7	8	Final
(Ontario) Glenn Howard	1	1	0	1	1	0	1	X	5
(Alberta) Matthew Blandford 🔨	0	0	1	0	0	1	0	X	2

Sheet B	1	2	3	4	5	6	7	8	Final
(Ontario) Brad Jacobs 🔨	2	0	0	1	0	0	2	X	5
(Ontario) John Epping	0	0	1	0	0	1	0	X	2

Sheet C	1	2	3	4	5	6	7	8	9	Final
(Newfoundland and Labrador) Brad Gushue 🔨	0	1	0	1	0	1	0	0	1	4
(Alberta) Kevin Koe	0	0	0	0	0	0	2	1	0	3

Sheet D	1	2	3	4	5	6	7	8	Final
(Switzerland) Peter de Cruz 🔨	2	0	2	0	0	3	X	X	7
(Ontario) Rob Rumfeldt	0	1	0	1	0	0	X	X	2

Sheet E	1	2	3	4	5	6	7	8	Final
(Alberta) John Morris	0	0	2	0	5	0	0	X	7
(Manitoba) Jeff Stoughton 🔨	1	0	0	1	0	1	1	X	4

== Playoffs ==
Quarterfinals
(Ontario) Glenn Howard	5
(United States) Heath McCormick	6
(Saskatchewan) Steve Laycock	4
(Manitoba) Mike McEwen	5
(Manitoba) Reid Carruthers	3
(Ontario) Brad Jacobs	6
(Alberta) Brendan Bottcher	7
(Alberta) John Morris	1

Semifinals
(United States) Heath McCormick	2
(Manitoba) Mike McEwen	5
(Ontario) Brad Jacobs	8
(Alberta) Brendan Bottcher	2

Final
(Manitoba) Mike McEwen	5
(Ontario) Brad Jacobs	2

=== Quarterfinals ===
Saturday, November 22, 12:00 pm

Team	1	2	3	4	5	6	7	8	Final
(Ontario) Glenn Howard 🔨	1	0	1	0	2	0	1	0	5
(United States) Heath McCormick	0	2	0	1	0	1	0	2	6

Player percentages
(Ontario) Team Howard		(United States) Team McCormick	
Craig Savill	90%	Ryan Brunt	88%
Jon Mead	88%	Joe Polo	76%
Richard Hart	81%	Christopher Plys	83%
Glenn Howard	92%	Heath McCormick	97%
Total	87%	Total	86%

Team	1	2	3	4	5	6	7	8	Final
(Saskatchewan) Steve Laycock	0	0	2	0	0	0	2	0	4
(Manitoba) Mike McEwen 🔨	0	1	0	2	0	1	0	1	5

Player percentages
(Saskatchewan) Team Laycock		(Manitoba) Team McEwen	
Dallan Muyres	96%	Denni Neufeld	81%
Colton Flasch	83%	Matt Wozniak	91%
Kirk Muyres	91%	B. J. Neufeld	93%
Steve Laycock	89%	Mike McEwen	94%
Total	90%	Total	90%

Team	1	2	3	4	5	6	7	8	Final
(Manitoba) Reid Carruthers 🔨	1	1	0	1	0	0	0	X	3
(Ontario) Brad Jacobs	0	0	3	0	2	0	1	X	6

Player percentages
(Manitoba) Team Carruthers		(Ontario) Team Jacobs	
Colin Hodgson	92%	Ryan Harnden	89%
Derek Samagalski	84%	E. J. Harnden	92%
Braeden Moskowy	84%	Ryan Fry	84%
Reid Carruthers	78%	Brad Jacobs	84%
Total	85%	Total	87%

Team	1	2	3	4	5	6	7	8	Final
(Alberta) Brendan Bottcher 🔨	3	1	1	1	0	1	X	X	7
(Alberta) John Morris	0	0	0	0	1	0	X	X	1

Player percentages
(Alberta) Team Bottcher		(Alberta) Team Morris	
Karrick Martin	100%	Nolan Thiessen	90%
Bradley Thiessen	89%	Scott Bailey	81%
Tom Appelman	87%	Pat Simmons	83%
Brendan Bottcher	72%	John Morris	50%
Total	85%	Total	76%

=== Semifinals ===
Saturday, November 22, 3:30 pm

Team	1	2	3	4	5	6	7	8	Final
(United States) Heath McCormick 🔨	0	0	0	0	0	1	1	0	2
(Manitoba) Mike McEwen	0	1	1	0	2	0	0	1	5

Player percentages
(United States) Team McCormick		(Manitoba) Team McEwen	
Colin Hufman	87%	Denni Neufeld	95%
Joe Polo	72%	Matt Wozniak	93%
Christopher Plys	83%	B. J. Neufeld	94%
Heath McCormick	70%	Mike McEwen	87%
Total	78%	Total	92%

Team	1	2	3	4	5	6	7	8	Final
(Ontario) Brad Jacobs	0	2	1	2	0	3	X	X	8
(Alberta) Brendan Bottcher 🔨	1	0	0	0	1	0	X	X	2

Player percentages
(Ontario) Team Jacobs		(Alberta) Team Bottcher	
Ryan Harnden	99%	Karrick Martin	89%
E. J. Harnden	82%	Bradley Thiessen	74%
Ryan Fry	89%	Tom Appelman	69%
Brad Jacobs	99%	Brendan Bottcher	64%
Total	92%	Total	74%

=== Final ===
Sunday, November 23, 3:30 pm

Team	1	2	3	4	5	6	7	8	Final
(Manitoba) Mike McEwen 🔨	0	1	1	0	1	0	1	1	5
(Ontario) Brad Jacobs	1	0	0	1	0	0	0	0	2

Player percentages
(Manitoba) Team McEwen		(Ontario) Team Jacobs	
Denni Neufeld	94%	Ryan Harnden	85%
Matt Wozniak	92%	E. J. Harnden	80%
B. J. Neufeld	86%	Ryan Fry	81%
Mike McEwen	81%	Brad Jacobs	77%
Total	88%	Total	81%
