= 2011 BDO Canadian Open of Curling (December) =

Grand Slam of Curling event

- Host city: Kingston, Ontario
- Arena: K-Rock Centre
- Dates: December 14–18
- Winner: (Manitoba) Mike McEwen
- Curling club: Assiniboine Memorial CC, Winnipeg
- Skip: Mike McEwen
- Third: B. J. Neufeld
- Second: Matt Wozniak
- Lead: Denni Neufeld
- Finalist: (Manitoba) Jeff Stoughton

The 2011 BDO Canadian Open of Curling in December was held from December 14 to 18 at the K-Rock Centre in Kingston, Ontario. It was the second Grand Slam event of the 2011–12 curling season and the eleventh time the tournament has been held. The purse was CAD$100,000.

In the final, Mike McEwen won the final over Jeff Stoughton in seven ends with a score of 5–2. He successfully defended his title from the last edition of the BDO Canadian Open, won his first Grand Slam title of the year, and won his third career Grand Slam title.

== Five-rock rule ==
A new five-rock rule was implemented at this edition of the Canadian Open. The rule, a slight alteration to the free guard zone rule, was tested at the event in an attempt to increase offence in the game. The new rule was predicted to favour teams who play more offence, as the rule allows for a fifth guard to be placed in the free guard zone. However, concerns were raised that the new rule may possibly hinder teams that are more defence-oriented, an opinion echoed by the Canadian Curling Association. Since the Canadian Open is a Grand Slam event, the Open carried many points on the Canadian Team Ranking System, which plays a role in determining Olympic trials participants. If a team were to miss qualifying for the 2013 trials because of a poor performance at the Open influenced by the five rock rule, the team could raise complaints to the CCA. As a result, the CCA stated that it would not sanction the event unless all players participating in the Open express written consent in regards to the five-rock rule. Not all players had agreed not to challenge the outcome of the Open, but the event went ahead as planned, with the five-rock rule in place.

== Teams ==
Skip	Third	Second	Lead	Locale
Tom Brewster	Greg Drummond	Scott Andrews	Michael Goodfellow	Aberdeen, Scotland
Jim Cotter	Kevin Folk	Tyrel Griffith	Rick Sawatsky	Kelowna/Vernon, British Columbia
Niklas Edin	Sebastian Kraupp	Fredrik Lindberg	Viktor Kjäll	Karlstad, Sweden
John Epping	Scott Bailey	Scott Howard	David Mathers	Toronto, Ontario
David Nedohin (fourth)	Randy Ferbey (skip)	Ted Appelman	Brendan Melnyk	Edmonton, Alberta
Rob Fowler	Allan Lyburn	Richard Daneault	Derek Samagalski	Brandon, Manitoba
Brad Gushue	Ryan Fry	Geoff Walker	Adam Casey	St. John's, Newfoundland and Labrador
Glenn Howard	Wayne Middaugh	Brent Laing	Craig Savill	Coldwater, Ontario
Brad Jacobs	E. J. Harnden	Ryan Harnden	Scott Seabrook	Sault Ste. Marie, Ontario
Mark Kean	Andrew Clayton	Patrick Janssen	Tim March	Toronto, Ontario
Kevin Koe	Pat Simmons	Carter Rycroft	Nolan Thiessen	Edmonton, Alberta
Steve Laycock	Joel Jordison	Brennen Jones	Dallan Muyres	Saskatoon, Saskatchewan
Kevin Martin	John Morris	Marc Kennedy	Ben Hebert	Edmonton, Alberta
Dale Matchett	Ryan Werenich	Jeff Gorda	Shawn Kaufman	Bradford, Ontario
Mike McEwen	B. J. Neufeld	Matt Wozniak	Denni Neufeld	Winnipeg, Manitoba
Jean-Michel Ménard	Martin Crête	Éric Sylvain	Philippe Ménard	Gatineau/Lévis, Quebec
Robert Schlender	Chris Lemishka	Darcy Hafso	Don Bartlett	Edmonton, Alberta
Jeff Stoughton	Jon Mead	Reid Carruthers	Steve Gould	Winnipeg, Manitoba

== Round-robin standings ==
Final round-robin standings

Key
Teams to Playoffs
Teams to Tiebreaker

Pool A	W	L	PF	PA
(Manitoba) Mike McEwen	5	0	34	12
(Sweden) Niklas Edin	4	1	29	20
(Newfoundland and Labrador) Brad Gushue	2	3	20	23
(Scotland) Tom Brewster	2	3	23	25
(Ontario) John Epping	1	4	17	33
(Ontario) Mark Kean	1	4	24	32

Pool B	W	L	PF	PA
(Ontario) Brad Jacobs	4	1	30	21
(Alberta) Kevin Martin*	3	2	23	15
(Quebec) Jean-Michel Ménard	3	2	27	26
(Alberta) Kevin Koe	3	2	28	26
(Alberta) Randy Ferbey	1	4	23	36
(Alberta) Robert Schlender	1	4	18	25

Pool C	W	L	PF	PA
(Manitoba) Jeff Stoughton	4	1	38	27
(Manitoba) Rob Fowler	4	1	32	21
(Ontario) Glenn Howard	4	1	33	16
(British Columbia) Jim Cotter	2	3	32	32
(Ontario) Dale Matchett	1	4	23	38
(Saskatchewan) Steve Laycock	0	5	14	38

*Kevin Martin advances directly to the playoffs by virtue of a draw to the button contest between Kevin Koe, Jean-Michel Ménard, and Martin.

== Round-robin results ==
=== Draw 1 ===
Wednesday, December 14, 7:30 pm

Sheet A	1	2	3	4	5	6	7	8	Final
(Manitoba) Mike McEwen 🔨	3	1	0	1	2	1	X	X	8
(Ontario) Mark Kean	0	0	2	0	0	0	X	X	2

Sheet B	1	2	3	4	5	6	7	8	Final
(Manitoba) Jeff Stoughton 🔨	1	0	2	0	1	1	0	1	6
(Manitoba) Rob Fowler	0	3	0	1	0	0	1	0	5

Sheet C	1	2	3	4	5	6	7	8	Final
(Alberta) Kevin Martin 🔨	0	1	0	0	0	2	0	0	3
(Ontario) Brad Jacobs	1	0	0	0	2	0	0	1	4

Sheet D	1	2	3	4	5	6	7	8	Final
(Alberta) Kevin Koe	0	1	0	1	0	2	1	0	5
(Quebec) Jean-Michel Ménard 🔨	1	0	0	0	2	0	0	1	4

Sheet E	1	2	3	4	5	6	7	8	Final
(Ontario) Glenn Howard 🔨	2	0	0	3	1	1	X	X	7
(Saskatchewan) Steve Laycock	0	1	0	0	0	0	X	X	1

=== Draw 2 ===
Thursday, December 15, 9:00 am

Sheet A	1	2	3	4	5	6	7	8	Final
(Manitoba) Jeff Stoughton	1	0	3	1	0	3	2	X	10
(Saskatchewan) Steve Laycock 🔨	0	3	0	0	1	0	0	X	4

Sheet B	1	2	3	4	5	6	7	8	Final
(Ontario) Dale Matchett	0	3	0	4	0	0	1	0	8
(British Columbia) Jim Cotter 🔨	2	0	1	0	3	2	0	2	10

Sheet C	1	2	3	4	5	6	7	8	Final
(Alberta) Randy Ferbey	0	1	2	0	0	1	0	1	5
(Alberta) Robert Schlender 🔨	3	0	0	1	1	0	1	0	6

Sheet D	1	2	3	4	5	6	7	8	Final
(Ontario) John Epping	0	0	0	0	1	1	0	X	2
(Scotland) Tom Brewster 🔨	1	1	1	1	0	0	3	X	7

Sheet E	1	2	3	4	5	6	7	8	Final
(Sweden) Niklas Edin	0	0	1	0	1	1	0	1	4
(Newfoundland and Labrador) Brad Gushue 🔨	0	1	0	1	0	0	1	0	3

=== Draw 3 ===
Thursday, December 15, 12:30 pm

Sheet A	1	2	3	4	5	6	7	8	Final
(Quebec) Jean-Michel Ménard 🔨	2	0	2	0	0	5	X	X	9
(Alberta) Randy Ferbey	0	1	0	2	0	0	X	X	3

Sheet B	1	2	3	4	5	6	7	8	Final
(Alberta) Kevin Martin	0	2	0	1	0	2	0	X	5
(Alberta) Kevin Koe 🔨	1	0	2	0	3	0	1	X	7

Sheet C	1	2	3	4	5	6	7	8	Final
(Ontario) Glenn Howard 🔨	2	1	2	1	1	X	X	X	7
(Ontario) Dale Matchett	0	0	0	0	0	X	X	X	0

Sheet D	1	2	3	4	5	6	7	8	Final
(Manitoba) Rob Fowler	0	3	0	1	0	2	0	X	6
(British Columbia) Jim Cotter 🔨	2	0	0	0	1	0	1	X	4

Sheet E	1	2	3	4	5	6	7	8	Final
(Ontario) Brad Jacobs	0	2	0	1	1	0	2	0	6
(Alberta) Robert Schlender 🔨	1	0	1	0	0	1	0	1	4

=== Draw 4 ===
Thursday, December 15, 4:00 pm

Sheet A	1	2	3	4	5	6	7	8	Final
(Alberta) Kevin Koe	0	1	0	0	2	0	X	X	3
(Ontario) Brad Jacobs 🔨	2	0	2	1	0	3	X	X	8

Sheet B	1	2	3	4	5	6	7	8	Final
(Manitoba) Mike McEwen 🔨	3	0	0	2	0	0	0	1	6
(Scotland) Tom Brewster	0	0	2	0	1	1	0	0	4

Sheet C	1	2	3	4	5	6	7	8	Final
(Ontario) John Epping	0	2	0	1	0	0	3	X	6
(Newfoundland and Labrador) Brad Gushue 🔨	1	0	1	0	0	1	0	X	3

Sheet D	1	2	3	4	5	6	7	8	9	Final
(Sweden) Niklas Edin 🔨	0	0	0	1	2	1	1	0	1	6
(Ontario) Mark Kean	1	2	1	0	0	0	0	1	0	5

Sheet E	1	2	3	4	5	6	7	8	Final
(Alberta) Kevin Martin 🔨	0	5	2	0	0	X	X	X	7
(Quebec) Jean-Michel Ménard	0	0	0	1	0	X	X	X	1

=== Draw 5 ===
Thursday, December 15, 7:30 pm

Sheet A	1	2	3	4	5	6	7	8	Final
(Manitoba) Mike McEwen	0	1	1	1	1	1	1	X	6
(Ontario) John Epping 🔨	1	0	0	0	0	0	0	X	1

Sheet B	1	2	3	4	5	6	7	8	Final
(Manitoba) Rob Fowler	0	0	3	1	0	1	1	0	6
(Ontario) Glenn Howard 🔨	0	0	0	0	3	0	0	1	4

Sheet C	1	2	3	4	5	6	7	8	Final
(Manitoba) Jeff Stoughton 🔨	1	2	1	0	1	0	0	2	7
(British Columbia) Jim Cotter	0	0	0	2	0	0	4	0	6

Sheet D	1	2	3	4	5	6	7	8	Final
(Ontario) Dale Matchett	0	0	1	0	2	2	2	X	7
(Saskatchewan) Steve Laycock 🔨	0	1	0	1	0	0	0	X	2

Sheet E	1	2	3	4	5	6	7	8	Final
(Scotland) Tom Brewster 🔨	2	0	1	0	0	2	1	1	7
(Ontario) Mark Kean	0	2	0	2	0	0	0	0	4

=== Draw 6 ===
Friday, December 16, 9:00 am

Sheet A	1	2	3	4	5	6	7	8	Final
(Quebec) Jean-Michel Ménard 🔨	0	1	1	0	2	0	2	1	7
(Alberta) Robert Schlender	1	0	0	1	0	4	0	0	6

Sheet B	1	2	3	4	5	6	7	8	Final
(Newfoundland and Labrador) Brad Gushue	1	2	0	1	0	0	1	0	5
(Ontario) Mark Kean 🔨	0	0	1	0	1	1	0	1	4

Sheet C	1	2	3	4	5	6	7	8	Final
(Manitoba) Rob Fowler 🔨	3	0	1	0	2	0	1	3	10
(Ontario) Dale Matchett	0	0	0	3	0	1	0	0	4

Sheet D	1	2	3	4	5	6	7	8	Final
(Sweden) Niklas Edin 🔨	2	0	0	0	2	0	4	X	8
(Scotland) Tom Brewster	0	1	0	0	0	1	0	X	2

Sheet E	1	2	3	4	5	6	7	8	Final
(Ontario) Brad Jacobs	0	2	0	3	0	1	0	1	7
(Alberta) Randy Ferbey 🔨	1	0	2	0	1	0	1	0	5

=== Draw 7 ===
Friday, December 16, 12:30 pm

Sheet A	1	2	3	4	5	6	7	8	Final
(Alberta) Kevin Martin 🔨	3	0	0	3	0	1	1	X	8
(Alberta) Randy Ferbey	0	0	1	0	2	0	0	X	3

Sheet B	1	2	3	4	5	6	7	8	Final
(Sweden) Niklas Edin 🔨	1	1	2	0	3	1	X	X	8
(Ontario) John Epping	0	0	0	2	0	0	X	X	2

Sheet C	1	2	3	4	5	6	7	8	Final
(Alberta) Kevin Koe 🔨	0	3	0	2	0	2	X	X	7
(Alberta) Robert Schlender	0	0	1	0	1	0	X	X	2

Sheet D	1	2	3	4	5	6	7	8	Final
(Manitoba) Mike McEwen	0	0	2	0	0	3	0	1	6
(Newfoundland and Labrador) Brad Gushue 🔨	0	1	0	1	1	0	1	0	4

Sheet E	1	2	3	4	5	6	7	8	Final
(British Columbia) Jim Cotter	3	1	0	1	4	0	X	X	9
(Saskatchewan) Steve Laycock 🔨	0	0	2	0	0	2	X	X	4

=== Draw 8 ===
Friday, December 16, 4:00 pm

Sheet A	1	2	3	4	5	6	7	8	Final
(Manitoba) Rob Fowler 🔨	0	0	1	0	1	2	0	1	5
(Saskatchewan) Steve Laycock	0	0	0	1	0	0	2	0	3

Sheet B	1	2	3	4	5	6	7	8	Final
(Ontario) Brad Jacobs 🔨	2	0	0	0	1	0	2	0	5
(Quebec) Jean-Michel Ménard	0	1	1	0	0	2	0	2	6

Sheet C	1	2	3	4	5	6	7	8	Final
(Ontario) Glenn Howard 🔨	0	0	1	0	2	0	2	2	7
(British Columbia) Jim Cotter	0	0	0	2	0	1	0	0	3

Sheet D	1	2	3	4	5	6	7	8	Final
(Ontario) John Epping	0	3	0	0	2	1	0	X	6
(Ontario) Mark Kean 🔨	3	0	4	0	0	0	2	X	9

Sheet E	1	2	3	4	5	6	7	8	Final
(Manitoba) Jeff Stoughton 🔨	2	0	1	0	5	1	X	X	8
(Ontario) Dale Matchett	0	3	0	1	0	0	X	X	4

=== Draw 9 ===
Friday, December 16, 7:30 pm

Sheet A	1	2	3	4	5	6	7	8	Final
(Newfoundland and Labrador) Brad Gushue	0	0	1	0	1	1	0	2	5
(Scotland) Tom Brewster 🔨	0	0	0	2	0	0	1	0	3

Sheet B	1	2	3	4	5	6	7	8	Final
(Ontario) Glenn Howard 🔨	1	1	0	4	0	1	1	X	8
(Manitoba) Jeff Stoughton	0	0	3	0	3	0	0	X	6

Sheet C	1	2	3	4	5	6	7	8	Final
(Manitoba) Mike McEwen 🔨	0	2	0	2	0	3	1	X	8
(Sweden) Niklas Edin	1	0	1	0	1	0	0	X	3

Sheet D	1	2	3	4	5	6	7	8	Final
(Alberta) Kevin Koe	2	0	2	0	1	0	1	0	6
(Alberta) Randy Ferbey 🔨	0	2	0	2	0	1	0	2	7

Sheet E	1	2	3	4	5	6	7	8	Final
(Alberta) Kevin Martin 🔨	4	0	1	0	0	3	X	X	8
(Alberta) Robert Schlender	0	1	0	1	1	0	X	X	3

== Tiebreaker ==
Saturday, December 17, 9:30

Team	1	2	3	4	5	6	7	8	Final
(Quebec) Jean-Michel Ménard 🔨	1	1	1	0	2	0	3	X	8
(Alberta) Kevin Koe	0	0	0	2	0	1	0	X	3

== Playoffs ==
Quarterfinals
(Manitoba) Mike McEwen	6
(Quebec) Jean-Michel Ménard	5
(Manitoba) Rob Fowler	6
(Sweden) Niklas Edin	7
(Manitoba) Jeff Stoughton	5
(Alberta) Kevin Martin	2
(Ontario) Brad Jacobs	3
(Ontario) Glenn Howard	6

Semifinals
(Manitoba) Mike McEwen	8
(Sweden) Niklas Edin	2
(Manitoba) Jeff Stoughton	8
(Ontario) Glenn Howard	6

Final
(Manitoba) Mike McEwen	5
(Manitoba) Jeff Stoughton	2

=== Quarterfinals ===
Saturday, December 17, 2:00 pm

Team	1	2	3	4	5	6	7	8	Final
(Manitoba) Mike McEwen 🔨	2	0	1	0	2	0	0	1	6
(Quebec) Jean-Michel Ménard	0	1	0	2	0	1	1	0	5

Team	1	2	3	4	5	6	7	8	Final
(Manitoba) Rob Fowler	0	0	2	0	2	0	2	0	6
(Sweden) Niklas Edin 🔨	2	1	0	2	0	1	0	1	7

Team	1	2	3	4	5	6	7	8	Final
(Manitoba) Jeff Stoughton 🔨	0	3	0	0	0	0	2	X	5
(Alberta) Kevin Martin	1	0	0	0	1	0	0	X	2

Team	1	2	3	4	5	6	7	8	Final
(Ontario) Brad Jacobs	0	1	0	1	0	1	0	X	3
(Ontario) Glenn Howard 🔨	2	0	1	0	2	0	1	X	6

=== Semifinals ===
Saturday, December 17, 7:00 pm

Team	1	2	3	4	5	6	7	8	Final
(Manitoba) Mike McEwen 🔨	1	0	2	1	0	4	X	X	8
(Sweden) Niklas Edin	0	1	0	0	1	0	X	X	2

Team	1	2	3	4	5	6	7	8	Final
(Manitoba) Jeff Stoughton 🔨	4	0	1	0	2	0	1	X	8
(Ontario) Glenn Howard	0	2	0	1	0	3	0	X	6

=== Final ===
Sunday, December 18, 1:00 pm

Team	1	2	3	4	5	6	7	8	Final
(Manitoba) Mike McEwen 🔨	0	2	0	1	0	1	1	X	5
(Manitoba) Jeff Stoughton	0	0	1	0	1	0	0	X	2
