= 2018 Elite 10 (September) =

Grand Slam of Curling event

2018 Princess Auto Elite 10
- Host city: Chatham, Ontario
- Arena: St. Clair Campus Arena
- Dates: September 26–30
- Men's winner: (Newfoundland and Labrador) Brad Gushue
- Curling club: St. John's CC, St. John's, NL
- Skip: Brad Gushue
- Third: Mark Nichols
- Second: Brett Gallant
- Lead: Geoff Walker
- Finalist: (Manitoba) Reid Carruthers
- Women's winner: (Sweden) Anna Hasselborg
- Curling club: Sundbybergs CK, Sundbyberg, SWE
- Skip: Anna Hasselborg
- Third: Sara McManus
- Second: Agnes Knochenhauer
- Lead: Sofia Mabergs
- Coach: Wayne Middaugh
- Finalist: (Switzerland) Silvana Tirinzoni

The 2018 Princess Auto Elite 10 was held from September 26 to 30 at St. Clair Campus Arena in Chatham, Ontario. It was the first Grand Slam of Curling event held in the 2018-19 curling season, and the first time the Elite 10 had a women's division. It was also the last time the event was held, as it was removed from the Grand Slam lineup for the 2019-20 curling season.

On the men's side, defending champions Brad Gushue won the event, their eleventh grand slam, beating out the new Reid Carruthers rink 1 UP in the final.

On the women's side, Olympic champion team Anna Hasselborg won their first grand slam event. They defeated team Silvana Tirinzoni 4-and-2, who were looking for their second ever grand slam victory.

== Format ==
Instead of normal curling scoring rules, the Elite 10 uses a match play system in which scoring is based on ends won, rather than rocks scored. An end is won by stealing or scoring two with the hammer, similar to skins curling. Unlike skins, however, there are no carry-overs. In the event of a tie, a draw to the button competition is held to determine the winner. In the standings, wins are worth three points, draw to the button wins are worth two points, and draw to the button losses are worth one point. At the end of the round robin, the top six teams (regardless of pool) advance to the playoffs, with the top two advancing to the semifinals automatically.

== Qualification ==
The top 10 men's and women's teams in the World Curling Tour's Order of Merit rankings as of August 1, 2018 were invited to compete in the Elite 10. If any teams declined, the next highest team was invited until the field of 10 teams was complete.

=== Men ===
Top Order of Merit men's teams as of August 1:

1. (Newfoundland and Labrador) Brad Gushue
2. (Sweden) Niklas Edin
3. (Alberta) Kevin Koe
4. (Scotland) Bruce Mouat
5. (Manitoba) Jason Gunnlaugson
6. (Manitoba) Reid Carruthers
7. (Ontario) Brad Jacobs
8. (Alberta) ~~Brendan Bottcher~~
9. (Switzerland) ~~Peter de Cruz~~
10. (Ontario) John Epping
11. (Ontario) Glenn Howard
12. (Norway) ~~Steffen Walstad~~
13. (United States) ~~John Shuster~~
14. (Norway) ~~Thomas Ulsrud~~
15. (South Korea) ~~Kim Chang-min~~
16. (Scotland) Ross Paterson

=== Women ===
Top Order of Merit women's teams as of August 1:

1. (Manitoba) Jennifer Jones
2. (Sweden) Anna Hasselborg
3. (Ontario) Rachel Homan
4. (Scotland) ~~Eve Muirhead~~
5. (Manitoba) Tracy Fleury
6. (Alberta) Laura Walker
7. (South Korea) ~~Kim Eun-jung~~
8. (United States) Nina Roth
9. (United States) Jamie Sinclair
10. (Japan) ~~Satsuki Fujisawa~~
11. (Alberta) Chelsea Carey
12. (Switzerland) Silvana Tirinzoni
13. (Alberta) Casey Scheidegger

== Men ==
=== Teams ===
Skip	Third	Second	Lead	Locale
Mike McEwen (Fourth)	Reid Carruthers (Skip)	Derek Samagalski	Colin Hodgson	Winnipeg, Manitoba
Niklas Edin	Oskar Eriksson	Rasmus Wranå	Christoffer Sundgren	Karlstad, Sweden
John Epping	Mat Camm	Brent Laing	Craig Savill	Toronto, Ontario
Jason Gunnlaugson	Alex Forrest	Denni Neufeld	Connor Njegovan	Morris, Manitoba
Brad Gushue	Mark Nichols	Brett Gallant	Geoff Walker	St. John's, Newfoundland and Labrador
Glenn Howard	Scott Howard	David Mathers	Tim March	Penetanguishene, Ontario
Brad Jacobs	Ryan Fry	E. J. Harnden	Ryan Harnden	Sault Ste. Marie, Ontario
Kevin Koe	B. J. Neufeld	Colton Flasch	Ben Hebert	Calgary, Alberta
Bruce Mouat	Grant Hardie	Bobby Lammie	Hammy McMillan Jr.	Edinburgh, Scotland
Ross Paterson	Kyle Waddell	Duncan Menzies	Michael Goodfellow	Glasgow, Scotland

=== Round-robin standings ===
Key
Teams to playoffs

Pool A	W	EEW	EEL	L	EF	EA	Pts
(Ontario) Glenn Howard	3	0	0	1	12	9	9
(Newfoundland and Labrador) Brad Gushue	3	0	0	1	12	4	9
(Ontario) John Epping	2	0	1	1	12	11	7
(Scotland) Bruce Mouat	1	0	0	3	8	13	3
(Manitoba) Jason Gunnlaugson	0	1	0	3	7	14	2

Pool B	W	EEW	EEL	L	EF	EA	Pts
(Manitoba) Reid Carruthers	3	1	0	0	14	8	11
(Alberta) Kevin Koe	3	0	0	1	13	5	9
(Ontario) Brad Jacobs	2	0	0	2	10	8	6
(Scotland) Ross Paterson	1	0	0	3	9	15	3
(Sweden) Niklas Edin	0	0	1	3	4	14	1

=== Round-robin results ===
All draw times are listed in Eastern Daylight time (UTC-4).

==== Draw 1 ====
Wednesday, September 26, 7:00 pm

Sheet B	1	2	3	4	5	6	7	8	Final
(Newfoundland and Labrador) Brad Gushue	✓	✓	✓		✓		X	X	4
(Manitoba) Jason Gunnlaugson 🔨				✓			X	X	1

Sheet C	1	2	3	4	5	6	7	8	Final
(Manitoba) Reid Carruthers			✓		✓		✓	✓	4
(Ontario) Brad Jacobs 🔨	✓			✓		✓			3

Sheet D	1	2	3	4	5	6	7	8	Final
(Ontario) John Epping	✓	✓	✓	✓		✓	X	X	5
(Ontario) Glenn Howard 🔨					✓		X	X	1

==== Draw 2 ====
Thursday, September 27, 8:30 am

Sheet C	1	2	3	4	5	6	7	8	Final
(Sweden) Niklas Edin 🔨			✓					X	1
(Scotland) Ross Paterson	✓			✓		✓	✓	X	4

Sheet D	1	2	3	4	5	6	7	8	Final
(Scotland) Bruce Mouat 🔨		✓		✓	✓		✓	X	4
(Manitoba) Jason Gunnlaugson	✓					✓		X	2

==== Draw 3 ====
Thursday, September 27, 12:00 pm

Sheet B	1	2	3	4	5	6	7	8	Final
(Alberta) Kevin Koe 🔨			✓	✓		✓	X	X	3
(Ontario) Brad Jacobs							X	X	0

Sheet E	1	2	3	4	5	6	7	8	Final
(Newfoundland and Labrador) Brad Gushue 🔨							✓	✓	2
(Ontario) Glenn Howard	✓		✓					✓	3

==== Draw 4 ====
Thursday, September 27, 4:00 pm

Sheet B	1	2	3	4	5	6	7	8	Final
(Scotland) Bruce Mouat 🔨			✓		✓	✓			3
(Ontario) John Epping	✓	✓		✓			✓	✓	4

Sheet C	1	2	3	4	5	6	7	8	Final
(Manitoba) Jason Gunnlaugson 🔨			✓					X	1
(Ontario) Glenn Howard				✓	✓	✓	✓	X	4

Sheet E	1	2	3	4	5	6	7	8	Final
(Sweden) Niklas Edin 🔨					✓		X	X	1
(Alberta) Kevin Koe	✓	✓	✓	✓				X	4

==== Draw 5 ====
Thursday, September 27, 8:00 pm

Sheet A	1	2	3	4	5	6	7	8	Final
(Manitoba) Reid Carruthers	✓		✓	✓		✓	✓	X	5
(Scotland) Ross Paterson 🔨		✓			✓			X	2

==== Draw 6 ====
Friday, September 28, 8:30 am

Sheet A	1	2	3	4	5	6	7	8	Final
(Scotland) Bruce Mouat		✓						X	1
(Ontario) Glenn Howard 🔨	✓		✓		✓		✓	X	4

Sheet E	1	2	3	4	5	6	7	8	Final
(Ontario) Brad Jacobs 🔨		✓		✓	✓	✓	X	X	4
(Scotland) Ross Paterson			✓				X	X	1

==== Draw 7 ====
Friday, September 28, 12:00 pm

Sheet B	1	2	3	4	5	6	7	8	9	Final
(Sweden) Niklas Edin		✓		✓						2
(Manitoba) Reid Carruthers 🔨			✓				✓		✓	3

Sheet C	1	2	3	4	5	6	7	8	Final
(Newfoundland and Labrador) Brad Gushue 🔨	✓	✓			✓	✓	X	X	4
(Ontario) John Epping							X	X	0

Sheet D	1	2	3	4	5	6	7	8	Final
(Alberta) Kevin Koe 🔨	✓	✓		✓	✓		✓	X	5
(Scotland) Ross Paterson			✓			✓		X	2

==== Draw 9 ====
Friday, September 28, 8:00 pm

Sheet A	1	2	3	4	5	6	7	8	9	Final
(Manitoba) Jason Gunnlaugson		✓					✓		✓	3
(Ontario) John Epping				✓	✓					2

Sheet B	1	2	3	4	5	6	7	8	Final
(Newfoundland and Labrador) Brad Gushue					✓		✓	X	2
(Scotland) Bruce Mouat								X	0

Sheet C	1	2	3	4	5	6	7	8	Final
(Alberta) Kevin Koe			✓						1
(Manitoba) Reid Carruthers				✓				✓	2

Sheet D	1	2	3	4	5	6	7	8	Final
(Sweden) Niklas Edin								X	0
(Ontario) Brad Jacobs		✓		✓			✓	X	3

=== Playoffs ===
Quarterfinals
(Ontario) Glenn Howard	0
(Ontario) John Epping	4
(Alberta) Kevin Koe	1
(Ontario) Brad Jacobs	4

Semifinals
(Manitoba) Reid Carruthers	3
(Ontario) John Epping	2
(Newfoundland and Labrador) Brad Gushue	4
(Ontario) Brad Jacobs	2

Final
(Manitoba) Reid Carruthers	1
(Newfoundland and Labrador) Brad Gushue	2

==== Quarterfinals ====
Saturday, September 29, 4:00 pm

Sheet B	1	2	3	4	5	6	7	8	Final
(Alberta) Kevin Koe	✓						X	X	1
(Ontario) Brad Jacobs		✓		✓	✓	✓	X	X	4

Player percentages
(Alberta) Kevin Koe		(Ontario) Brad Jacobs	
Ben Hebert	89%	Ryan Harnden	79%
Colton Flasch	76%	E. J. Harnden	78%
B. J. Neufeld	79%	Ryan Fry	78%
Kevin Koe	53%	Brad Jacobs	85%
Total	74%	Total	80%

Sheet C	1	2	3	4	5	6	7	8	Final
(Ontario) Glenn Howard 🔨						X	X	X	0
(Ontario) John Epping	✓	✓		✓	✓	X	X	X	4

Player percentages
(Ontario) Glenn Howard		(Ontario) John Epping	
Tim March	83%	Craig Savill	88%
David Mathers	62%	Brent Laing	80%
Scott Howard	73%	Mat Camm	95%
Glenn Howard	41%	John Epping	92%
Total	65%	Total	89%

==== Semifinals ====
Saturday, September 29, 8:00 pm

Sheet B	1	2	3	4	5	6	7	8	9	Final
(Manitoba) Reid Carruthers 🔨					✓		✓		✓	3
(Ontario) John Epping				✓		✓				2

Player percentages
(Manitoba) Reid Carruthers		(Ontario) John Epping	
Colin Hodgson	88%	Craig Savill	88%
Derek Samagalski	78%	Brent Laing	90%
Reid Carruthers	80%	Mat Camm	70%
Mike McEwen	79%	John Epping	73%
Total	81%	Total	80%

Sheet C	1	2	3	4	5	6	7	8	Final
(Newfoundland and Labrador) Brad Gushue 🔨			✓	✓	✓			✓	4
(Ontario) Brad Jacobs						✓	✓		2

Player percentages
(Newfoundland and Labrador) Brad Gushue		(Ontario) Brad Jacobs	
Geoff Walker	91%	Ryan Harnden	88%
Brett Gallant	96%	E. J. Harnden	78%
Mark Nichols	81%	Ryan Fry	79%
Brad Gushue	83%	Brad Jacobs	61%
Total	88%	Total	77%

==== Final ====
Sunday, September 30, 4:00 pm

Sheet C	1	2	3	4	5	6	7	8	Final
(Manitoba) Reid Carruthers							✓		1
(Newfoundland and Labrador) Brad Gushue		✓				✓			2

Player percentages
(Manitoba) Reid Carruthers		(Newfoundland and Labrador) Brad Gushue	
Colin Hodgson	88%	Geoff Walker	93%
Derek Samagalski	78%	Brett Gallant	79%
Reid Carruthers	77%	Mark Nichols	84%
Mike McEwen	56%	Brad Gushue	87%
Total	75%	Total	86%

== Women ==
=== Teams ===
Skip	Third	Second	Lead	Locale
Chelsea Carey	Sarah Wilkes	Dana Ferguson	Rachelle Brown	Edmonton, Alberta
Tracy Fleury	Selena Njegovan	Liz Fyfe	Kristin MacCuish	East St. Paul, Manitoba
Anna Hasselborg	Sara McManus	Agnes Knochenhauer	Sofia Mabergs	Sundbyberg, Sweden
Rachel Homan	Emma Miskew	Joanne Courtney	Lisa Weagle	Ottawa, Ontario
Jennifer Jones	Kaitlyn Lawes	Jocelyn Peterman	Dawn McEwen	Winnipeg, Manitoba
Nina Roth	Tabitha Peterson	Aileen Geving	Becca Hamilton	Blaine, United States
Casey Scheidegger	Cary-Anne McTaggart	Jessie Scheidegger	Kristie Moore	Lethbridge, Alberta
Jamie Sinclair	Alex Carlson	Sarah Anderson	Monica Walker	Blaine, United States
Alina Pätz (Fourth)	Silvana Tirinzoni (Skip)	Esther Neuenschwander	Melanie Barbezat	Aarau, Switzerland
Laura Walker	Cathy Overton-Clapham	Lori Olson-Johns	Laine Peters	Edmonton, Alberta

=== Round-robin standings ===
Key
Teams to playoffs

Pool A	W	EEW	EEL	L	EF	EA	Pts
(Manitoba) Jennifer Jones	3	1	0	0	17	6	11
(Switzerland) Silvana Tirinzoni	2	0	1	1	12	12	7
(Alberta) Laura Walker	1	1	0	2	10	13	5
(Manitoba) Tracy Fleury	0	1	2	1	9	14	4
(Alberta) Chelsea Carey	1	0	0	3	8	11	3

Pool B	W	EEW	EEL	L	EF	EA	Pts
(Sweden) Anna Hasselborg	4	0	0	0	14	6	12
(Alberta) Casey Scheidegger	2	0	1	1	11	10	7
(Ontario) Rachel Homan	1	1	0	2	11	12	5
(United States) Nina Roth	1	0	0	3	8	10	3
(United States) Jamie Sinclair	1	0	0	3	8	14	3

=== Round-robin results ===
All draw times are listed in Eastern Daylight time (UTC-4).

==== Draw 1 ====
Wednesday, September 26, 7:00 pm

Sheet A	1	2	3	4	5	6	7	8	Final
(Manitoba) Jennifer Jones 🔨		✓		✓	✓	✓	X	X	4
(Alberta) Chelsea Carey							X	X	0

Sheet E	1	2	3	4	5	6	7	8	Final
(Sweden) Anna Hasselborg 🔨	✓		✓		✓	✓	X	X	4
(United States) Jamie Sinclair		✓					X	X	1

==== Draw 2 ====
Thursday, September 27, 8:30 am

Sheet A	1	2	3	4	5	6	7	8	Final
(United States) Nina Roth		✓			✓				2
(Alberta) Casey Scheidegger 🔨	✓		✓	✓					3

Sheet E	1	2	3	4	5	6	7	8	9	Final
(Manitoba) Tracy Fleury		✓				✓		✓		3
(Alberta) Laura Walker 🔨				✓	✓		✓		✓	4

==== Draw 3 ====
Thursday, September 27, 12:00 pm

Sheet A	1	2	3	4	5	6	7	8	Final
(Ontario) Rachel Homan 🔨	✓				✓		✓	✓	4
(United States) Jamie Sinclair				✓		✓			2

Sheet C	1	2	3	4	5	6	7	8	Final
(Manitoba) Tracy Fleury 🔨						X	X	X	0
(Alberta) Chelsea Carey	✓	✓	✓		✓	X	X	X	4

Sheet D	1	2	3	4	5	6	7	8	Final
(Manitoba) Jennifer Jones		✓	✓	✓	✓		✓	X	5
(Switzerland) Silvana Tirinzoni 🔨	✓					✓		X	2

==== Draw 5 ====
Thursday, September 27, 8:00 pm

Sheet B	1	2	3	4	5	6	7	8	Final
(Sweden) Anna Hasselborg 🔨				✓	✓		✓	X	3
(Alberta) Casey Scheidegger						✓		X	1

Sheet C	1	2	3	4	5	6	7	8	Final
(Manitoba) Jennifer Jones 🔨			✓	✓	✓	✓	X	X	4
(Alberta) Laura Walker	✓						X	X	1

Sheet D	1	2	3	4	5	6	7	8	Final
(Ontario) Rachel Homan							X	X	0
(United States) Nina Roth 🔨	✓		✓	✓			X	X	3

Sheet E	1	2	3	4	5	6	7	8	Final
(Alberta) Chelsea Carey 🔨			✓		✓			X	2
(Switzerland) Silvana Tirinzoni		✓		✓		✓	✓	X	4

==== Draw 6 ====
Friday, September 28, 8:30 am

Sheet B	1	2	3	4	5	6	7	8	Final
(Alberta) Laura Walker 🔨		✓		✓				✓	3
(Alberta) Chelsea Carey					✓	✓			2

Sheet C	1	2	3	4	5	6	7	8	Final
(United States) Jamie Sinclair	✓			✓		✓		✓	4
(United States) Nina Roth 🔨			✓				✓		2

Sheet D	1	2	3	4	5	6	7	8	9	Final
(Manitoba) Tracy Fleury 🔨			✓		✓				✓	3
(Switzerland) Silvana Tirinzoni							✓	✓		2

==== Draw 7 ====
Friday, September 28, 12:00 pm

Sheet A	1	2	3	4	5	6	7	8	Final
(Sweden) Anna Hasselborg 🔨		✓		✓				✓	3
(United States) Nina Roth						✓			1

Sheet E	1	2	3	4	5	6	7	8	9	Final
(Ontario) Rachel Homan		✓				✓	✓		✓	4
(Alberta) Casey Scheidegger 🔨				✓	✓			✓		3

==== Draw 8 ====
Friday, September 28, 4:00 pm

Sheet A	1	2	3	4	5	6	7	8	Final
(Alberta) Laura Walker 🔨	✓				✓			X	2
(Switzerland) Silvana Tirinzoni		✓	✓	✓		✓		X	4

Sheet B	1	2	3	4	5	6	7	8	9	Final
(Manitoba) Jennifer Jones 🔨			✓	✓			✓		✓	4
(Manitoba) Tracy Fleury	✓				✓			✓		3

Sheet C	1	2	3	4	5	6	7	8	Final
(Sweden) Anna Hasselborg		✓				✓	✓	✓	4
(Ontario) Rachel Homan 🔨			✓	✓	✓				3

Sheet D	1	2	3	4	5	6	7	8	Final
(United States) Jamie Sinclair 🔨				✓				X	1
(Alberta) Casey Scheidegger	✓		✓		✓		✓	X	4

=== Playoffs ===
Quarterfinals
(Alberta) Casey Scheidegger	1
(Ontario) Rachel Homan	3
(Switzerland) Silvana Tirinzoni	3
(Alberta) Laura Walker	1

Semifinals
(Sweden) Anna Hasselborg	3
(Ontario) Rachel Homan	2
(Manitoba) Jennifer Jones	2
(Switzerland) Silvana Tirinzoni	3

Final
(Sweden) Anna Hasselborg	4
(Switzerland) Silvana Tirinzoni	0

==== Quarterfinals ====
Saturday, September 29, 12:00 pm

Sheet B	1	2	3	4	5	6	7	8	Final
(Alberta) Casey Scheidegger			✓					X	1
(Ontario) Rachel Homan 🔨	✓			✓		✓		X	3

Player percentages
(Alberta) Casey Scheidegger		(Ontario) Rachel Homan	
Kristie Moore	86%	Lisa Weagle	87%
Jessie Haughian	73%	Joanne Courtney	78%
Cary-Anne McTaggart	56%	Emma Miskew	73%
Casey Scheidegger	44%	Rachel Homan	60%
Total	65%	Total	75%

Sheet C	1	2	3	4	5	6	7	8	Final
(Switzerland) Silvana Tirinzoni 🔨		✓			✓	✓		X	3
(Alberta) Laura Walker			✓					X	1

Player percentages
(Switzerland) Silvana Tirinzoni		(Alberta) Laura Walker	
Melanie Barbezat	83%	Laine Peters	83%
Esther Neuenschwander	68%	Lori Olson-Johns	83%
Silvana Tirinzoni	90%	Cathy Overton-Clapham	74%
Alina Pätz	61%	Laura Walker	40%
Total	76%	Total	70%

==== Semifinals ====
Saturday, September 29, 8:00 pm

Sheet A	1	2	3	4	5	6	7	8	Final
(Sweden) Anna Hasselborg 🔨		✓	✓			✓			3
(Ontario) Rachel Homan	✓				✓				2

Player percentages
(Sweden) Anna Hasselborg		(Ontario) Rachel Homan	
Sofia Mabergs	76%	Lisa Weagle	83%
Agnes Knochenhauer	86%	Joanne Courtney	69%
Sara McManus	77%	Emma Miskew	76%
Anna Hasselborg	85%	Rachel Homan	60%
Total	81%	Total	72%

Sheet D	1	2	3	4	5	6	7	8	Final
(Manitoba) Jennifer Jones		✓					✓		2
(Switzerland) Silvana Tirinzoni 🔨			✓			✓		✓	3

Player percentages
(Manitoba) Jennifer Jones		(Switzerland) Silvana Tirinzoni	
Dawn McEwen	78%	Melanie Barbezat	76%
Jocelyn Peterman	81%	Esther Neuenschwander	79%
Kaitlyn Lawes	78%	Silvana Tirinzoni	64%
Jennifer Jones	78%	Alina Pätz	85%
Total	79%	Total	76%

==== Final ====
Sunday, September 30, 12:00 pm

Sheet C	1	2	3	4	5	6	7	8	Final
(Sweden) Anna Hasselborg			✓	✓	✓	✓	X	X	4
(Switzerland) Silvana Tirinzoni							X	X	0

Player percentages
(Sweden) Anna Hasselborg		(Switzerland) Silvana Tirinzoni	
Sofia Mabergs	89%	Melanie Barbezat	86%
Agnes Knochenhauer	75%	Esther Neuenschwander	74%
Sara McManus	82%	Silvana Tirinzoni	58%
Anna Hasselborg	88%	Alina Pätz	55%
Total	83%	Total	68%
