= Dale Matchett (curler) =

Canadian curler

- Curler
- Born: September 1, 1975 (age 51); Newmarket, Ontario

Team
- Curling club: Cookstown CC, Cookstown, ON

Curling career
- Member Association: Ontario
- Top CTRS ranking: 11th (2009-10)

Dale Matchett (born September 1, 1975 in Newmarket, Ontario) is a Canadian curler from Alliston, Ontario. Matchett is a former provincial junior curling champion and a regular on the World Curling Tour.

== Career ==
=== Junior career ===
In his junior career, Matchett qualified for four provincial junior championships (1993, 1994, 1995, 1996), winning in 1994 playing second for Joe Frans. The team would then represent Ontario at the 1994 Canadian Junior Curling Championships, where they finished with a 7-4 record in 4th place. The same year Matchett skipped his Bradford District High School team to the Ontario Schoolboy Championship.

=== Men's career ===
Matchett began his men's career as a skip in the late 1990s. His first World Curling Tour event was the 1998 Shorty Jenkins Classic, where his team of Ryan Werenich, Tim Morrison and Brad Anderson finished 6th.

When the Ontario Curling Tour began, Matchett became a regular on it, winning several events.

Ontario Curling Tour Wins (since 2004)

- 2004 Galt Cashspiel
- 2004 Listowel Cashspiel
- 2005 Brampton Classic
- 2006 Sudbury Open
- 2007 Gord Widdis Memorial Las Vegas
- 2008 OCT Championships
- 2008 KW Classic
- 2008 Nissan Classic
- 2008 Gord Widdis Memorial Las Vegas
- 2009 KW Classic
- 2010 Brampton Classic
- 2010 Nissan Classic

Although he has had success on the Ontario Curling Tour, Matchett has struggled to make it to provincial championships. During this time frame, he only played in two provincial championships, the 2006 Kia Cup (finishing 4th) and the 2011 Dominion Tankard (7th).

Matchett has played in eight (as of 2014) Grand Slam events in his career. He has only made the playoffs once, at the 2011 BDO Canadian Open of Curling. Matchett, and his then-rink of Werenich, Jeff Gorda and Shawn Kaufman sneaked into the playoffs with a 3-2 record, but lost in the quarterfinal to Mike McEwen.

After skipping for most of his curling career, Matchett joined the Darryl Prebble rink in 2014 as Prebble's third.

== Personal life ==
Matchett is legally blind in his right eye following a surgery to remove the lens in his eye in 1996.
