= Mike McEwen (curler) =

Canadian curler (born 1980)

Michael McEwen
- Curler
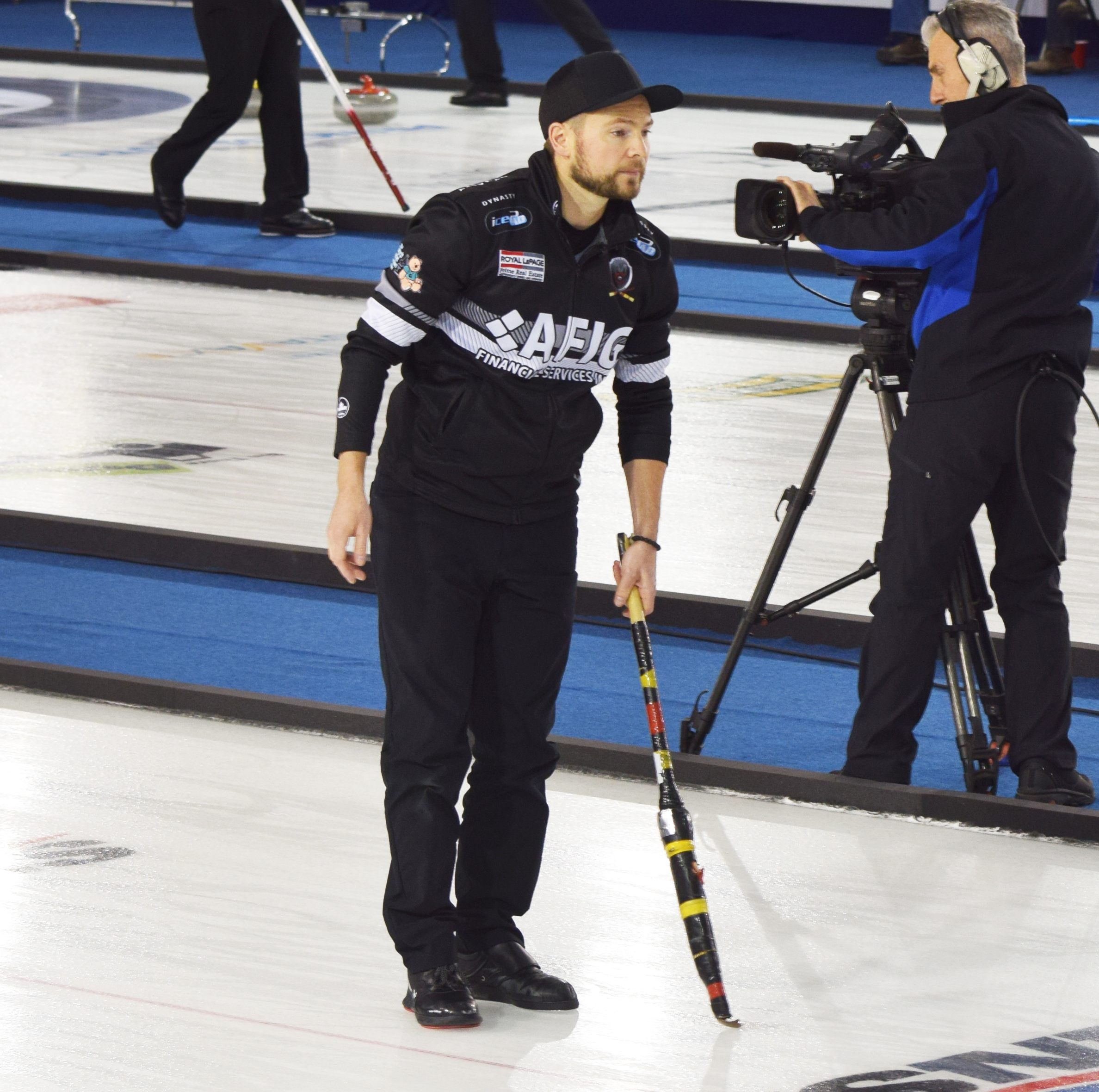
- Mike McEwen at the 2018 Elite 10 Grand Slam curling event in Winnipeg, Manitoba.
- Born: July 30, 1980 (age 46); Brandon, Manitoba, Canada

Team
- Skip: Mike McEwen
- Third: Rylan Kleiter
- Second: Joshua Mattern
- Lead: Trevor Johnson

Curling career
- Member Association: Manitoba (1998–2022); Ontario (2022–2023); Saskatchewan (2023–present)
- Brier: 11 (2016, 2017, 2018, 2019, 2020, 2021, 2022, 2023, 2024, 2025, 2026)
- Top CTRS ranking: 1st (2014–15)
- Grand Slam victories: 7 (2010 World Cup, 2011 Canadian Open (Jan.), 2011 Canadian Open (Dec.), 2014 National (Nov.), 2015 Elite 10, 2015 Masters, 2018 Elite 10 (Mar.))
Medal record
Men's curling
Representing Canada
Winter Universiade
Gold medal – first place	2003 Tarvisio
Representing Manitoba
Canadian Olympic Curling Trials
Silver medal – second place	2017 Ottawa
The Brier
Bronze medal – third place	2017 St. John's
Representing Saskatchewan
Canadian Olympic Curling Trials
Bronze medal – third place	2025 Halifax
The Brier
Silver medal – second place	2024 Regina

Michael McEwen (born July 30, 1980) is a Canadian curler from Winnipeg, Manitoba, who grew up in Brandon, Manitoba. McEwen won six Grand Slams in his career before his team qualified for their first Brier, Canada's national championship in 2016. He is noted as one of the top curlers using the Manitoba tuck delivery today. He is nicknamed "Magic" Mike McEwen.

== Career ==
=== Early career ===
In 1998, McEwen won his first of two Manitoba Junior championships, sending him and his team of David Chalmers, Bryce Granger and Kevin Schmidt to the 1998 Canadian Junior Curling Championships. There, he led his Manitoba rink to 9-3 round robin record, in 2nd place. This put the team in a semifinal match up against Ontario's John Morris. McEwen would lose the match 8–4, settling for third place.

Three years later, McEwen and his new team of Denni Neufeld, Geordie Hargreaves and Nolan Thiessen won the Manitoba junior championships again, qualifying them to represent Manitoba at the 2001 Canadian Juniors. There, they finished in 3rd place after the round robin, with a 9–3 record. This put the team into the semifinals against Northern Ontario's Brian Adams. McEwen beat Adams 8–3, qualifying for the final against Newfoundland's Brad Gushue. McEwen and his Manitoba rink would lose to Gushue, by a score of 8–3, placing them in 2nd place.

In 2003, McEwen and teammates Denni Neufeld, Sheldon Wettig, Marc Kennedy and Nolan Thiessen represented Canada at the 2003 Winter Universiade. McEwen and Wettig represented Brandon University, while his teammates represented the University of Manitoba (Neufeld and Thiessen) and the University of Alberta (Kennedy) . The team finished the round robin with a 6–3 record, in third place. The team then went on to beat Great Britain's Paul Stevenson in the semi-final, then Switzerland's Cyril Stutz in the final, to claim the gold medal.

The following season, McEwen joined the James Kirkness rink as the team's third. McEwen would play for Kirkness for two seasons, and won one World Curling Tour event, the Dauphin Clinic Pharmacy Cashspiel. In 2005, McEwen would form his own team of Justin Richter, Matt Wozniak and Andrew Melnuk. However, his lone Grand Slam appearance before forming his current rink in 2007 was the February 2006 Masters of Curling event, where he joined up with Ryan Fry.

For the 2006–07 season, Richter and Melnuk left the team and were replaced with Geordie Hargreaves and Adam Guenther. The team disbanded after just one season together.

=== 2007-2010 ===
McEwen formed a new rink once again of brothers Denni and B. J. Neufeld and Matt Wozniak in 2007. In their first season together, they were a semi-finalist at the 2008 Safeway Championship, Manitoba's provincial championship. Their first Grand Slam event as a team was at the end season, at the 2008 Players' Championships. The team won two games, before being eliminated.

At the conclusion of the 2008–09 season the McEwen team was ranked 7th on the CCA rankings. They had made it to three Grand Slam playoffs, and finished 4th at the 2009 Safeway Championship.

During the 'Road to the Roar' 2009 Olympic Qualifier, the McEwen team just lost out to fellow Manitobans the Jason Gunnlaugson team in the semi-finals. McEwen thus missed out on the 2009 Canadian Olympic Curling Trials final despite being the favourite in that particular matchup vs Gunnlaugson. On the tour that season, they won the 2009 Sun Life Classic.

McEwen's rink made it to his first provincial final in 2010, when he lost to Jeff Stoughton in the 2010 Manitoba provincial final. The game was being played in Steinbach, Manitoba and as the Neufeld brothers and their father have roots in Steinbach, were treated very much as the home team and crowd favourites.

=== 2010-2015: Grand Slam success and perennial provincial runner-up ===
McEwen started the 2010–11 season off well by defeating provincial rival Jeff Stoughton to win the World Cup of Curling and his first ever Grand Slam title in November, 2010. In part of the teams runner-up result in the provincial finals of 2010 and in part because of his 4 victories (2010 Canad Inns Prairie Classic, 2010 Sun Life Classic, 2010 Challenge Casino de Charlevoix and 2011 Ramada Perth Masters), and leading the overall money winnings in the World Curling Tour season as of November 2010, the McEwen team was named as a nominee for the provincial team of the year by the Manitoba Sportswriters and Sportscasters Association.

The team continued their strong season that year by defeating provincial rival Stoughton in the semi-final of the 2011 Canadian Open. McEwen would then go on to beat the Glenn Howard team in the extra end of the final, thus winning their second career Grand Slam and their second of that season.

McEwen's rink once again made it to the Manitoba provincial this time, being the top seed (also ranked 1st in Canada). However, once again lost to Stoughton in the final of the 2011 Safeway Championship, losing by one point in the final end. The next season, Team McEwen won their third Grand Slam at the Canadian Open in December 2011. On the tour, they also won the 2011 Point Optical Curling Classic, the 2011 Canad Inns Prairie Classic, the 2011 Cactus Pheasant Classic and the 2012 Mercure Perth Masters. Later in the season, the McEwen team lost their third straight provincial final game at the 2012 Safeway Championship, this time losing to Rob Fowler, thus tying a provincial record for consecutive final losses previous set by Kerry Burtnyk from 97 to 99. This dubious record was avoided in 2013, when the McEwen rink failed to reach the final, but again losing to the rival Stoughton rink in the 2013 Safeway Championship semi-final. The 2012–13 season was not as strong for the McEwen rink. On the tour, they won just one event, the 2012 Whites Drug Store Classic. They had more success the next season, winning the 2013 Cactus Pheasant Classic, 2013 Canad Inns Prairie Classic, the 2013 China Open and the 2014 Pomeroy Inn & Suites Prairie Showdown. However, once again, at the 2014 Safeway Championship, the team lost the final to Stoughton.

Team McEwen spent the 2014 off season working with a personal trainer, and began spending time with a sports psychologist. However, their biggest change was adopting new brush heads made by Hardline, which precipitated a huge shift in curling broom technology, which ultimately led to the "broomgate" scandal of the following season. Thanks in part to their new brush heads, the team found a lot of success during the 2014–15 season, winning the 2014 Canada Cup of Curling and winning two slams, the November 2014 National and the 2015 Elite 10. On the tour they won the 2014 Stu Sells Oakville Tankard, the 2014 Canad Inns Men's Classic, the 2014 Challenge Chateau Cartier de Gatineau, the 2014 Point Optical Curling Classic and the 2015 Pomeroy Inn & Suites Prairie Showdown. Despite being ranked first in the world on both the World Curling Tour Order of Merit rankings and on the WCT money list, McEwen lost his fifth provincial final in six years in 2015, losing to Reid Carruthers.

=== 3 Briers and team breakup ===
Early on in the 2015–16 season, Team McEwen found success by winning the 2015 Masters, as well as the 2015 Stu Sells Toronto Tankard and the 2015 Point Optical Curling Classic. McEwen's rink would win their first provincial title in 2016, sending them to their first Brier. The team had already booked their place to the 2016 Tim Hortons Brier as their opponents, the Matt Dunstone rink had committed themselves to the 2016 World Junior Curling Championships which occurred at the same time as the Brier. When the Dunstone rink beat Reid Carruthers in the semi-final this meant that McEwen's team would go to the Brier, even if they had lost to Dunstone.

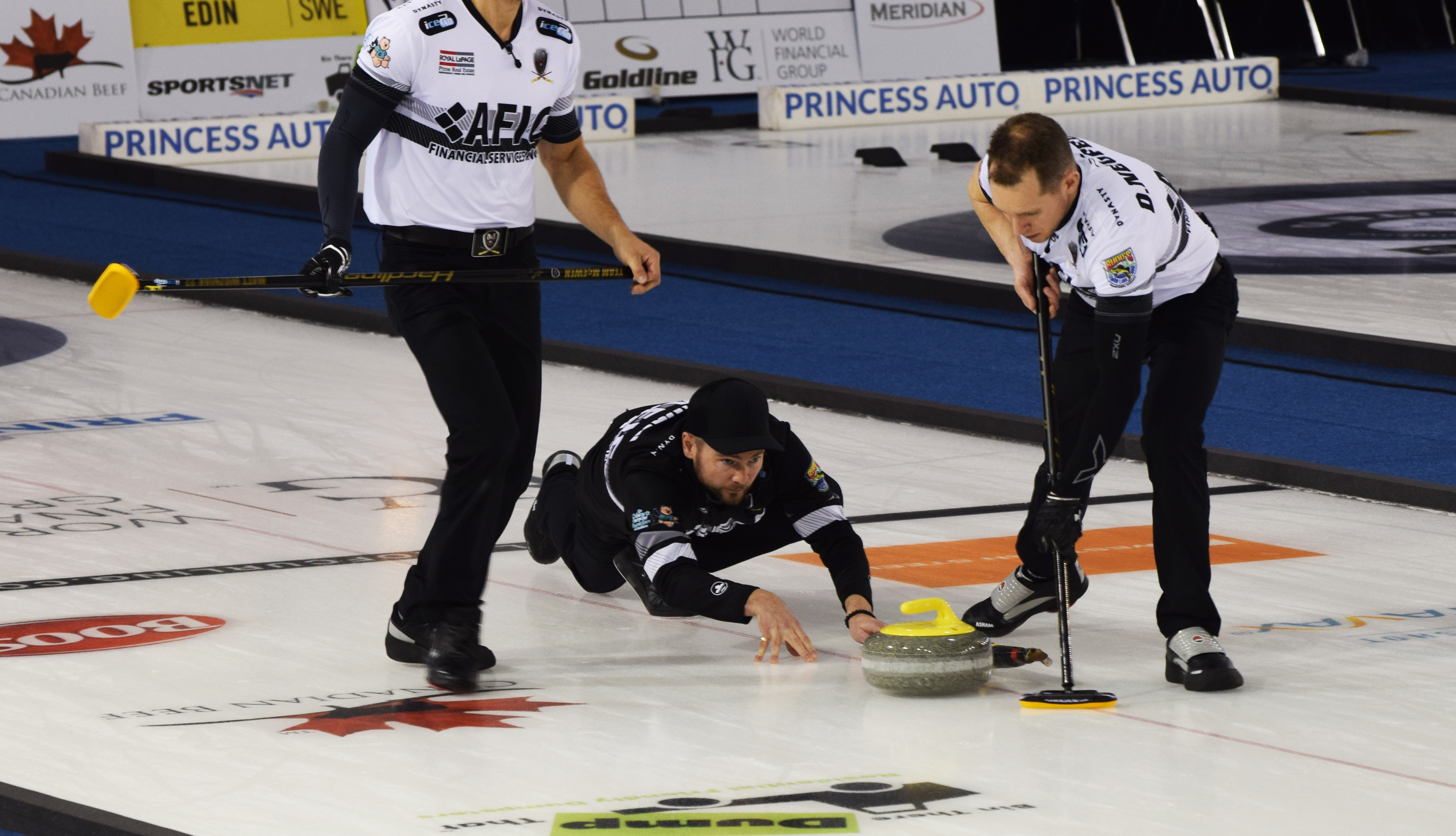
Mike McEwen delivers a rock at the 2018 Elite 10 Grand Slam curling event in Winnipeg, Manitoba.

In 2017 McEwen would defend his Manitoba Championship by beating Reid Carruthers in the final of the 2017 Viterra Championship. At the 2017 Tim Hortons Brier, he would then better his 2016 Brier showing, going 9–2 in the round robin to enter the playoffs in 1st place and with hammer and choice of rocks (Brad Gushue would also be 9-2 but would lose 1st place due to losing his round robin meeting with Mike). He would fall 7–5 to Brad Gushue in the 1–2 game however. In the semi-finals against reigning Brier and World Champion Kevin Koe he was in control almost the whole way but up 5–3 with hammer in the 8th end Koe would make an incredible comeback with a steal in the 8th, a two in the 10th, and another steal in the extra end, dropping Mike to the bronze medal game. Mike would recover from this disappointment to win his first Brier medal, defeating Brad Jacobs in their rematch of the 2016 bronze medal game, 7–6 in an extra end. On the tour that season, the team won just two events, the 2016 DeKalb Superspiel and the 2017 Ed Werenich Golden Wrench Classic. The team won the Golden Wrench Classic the following year as well.

While competing at the 2018 Viterra Championship McEwen came down with chickenpox and was unable to play after the first game. B. J. Neufeld skipped the team, until a surprise appearance by McEwen in the final where they would lose to Carruthers. Despite the setback, McEwen still had a chance to qualify for the 2018 Tim Hortons Brier through the wildcard game, which he won over Jason Gunnlaugson. McEwen had a difficult Brier and alongside Carruthers was unable to qualify for the playoffs. Following the disappointment at the Brier the McEwen team announced they would be breaking up at the end of the 2017–18 season. Just days after the announcement the McEwen team won the 2018 Elite 10 Grand Slam of Curling event, winning the top $28,000 prize money, and was the first team to go through the entire event undefeated. The Grand Slam victory was the team's seventh overall. Shortly after the event it was announced that McEwen would join his friend, Reid Carruthers, on his team throwing the fourth rocks, while Carruthers would continue to skip the team.

=== Joining Carruthers ===
After joining the Carruthers team with Derek Samagalski and Colin Hodgson at second and lead, the team found quick success finishing runner-up at the 2018 Elite 10 (September) to Brad Gushue. That would be the only Slam they would qualify in, missing the playoffs at the other six events. They also missed the playoffs at the 2018 Canada Cup, going 0–6. They had a better tour season, winning the Stu Sells Toronto Tankard, Karuizawa International and the Ed Werenich Golden Wrench Classic. They also were successful at the 2019 Viterra Championship, defeating William Lyburn in the final. At the 2019 Tim Hortons Brier, McEwen led Manitoba to a 6–5 record, just missing the playoffs. McEwen was officially named the teams skip for the 2019–20 season.

Team McEwen had a more successful following season. On the tour, they never missed the playoffs and they won one event, the inaugural WCT Uiseong International Curling Cup. In Grand Slam play, they reached the quarterfinals of the Tour Challenge and the National and the semifinals of the Canadian Open. They would not defend their provincial title, losing the final of the 2020 Viterra Championship to Jason Gunnlaugson. They would still compete at the 2020 Tim Hortons Brier though, winning the Wild Card spot over Glenn Howard in the play-in game. Team McEwen finished the round robin and championship pool with a 7–4 record, which was a four-way tie for fourth. They faced John Epping in the first round of tiebreakers where they lost 8–5 and were eliminated. It would be the team's last event of the season as both the Players' Championship and the Champions Cup Grand Slam events were cancelled due to the COVID-19 pandemic.

In their lone tour event of the 2020–21 season, Team McEwen won the 2020 Ashley HomeStore Curling Classic. Due to the COVID-19 pandemic in Manitoba, the 2021 provincial championship was cancelled. As the reigning provincials champions, Team Jason Gunnlaugson was chosen to represent Manitoba at the 2021 Tim Hortons Brier. However, due to many provinces cancelling their provincial championships due to the COVID-19 pandemic in Canada, Curling Canada added three Wild Card teams to the national championship, which were based on the CTRS standings from the 2019–20 season. Because Team McEwen ranked 5th on the CTRS and kept at least three of their four players together for the 2020–21 season, they got the first Wild Card spot at the 2021 Brier in Calgary, Alberta. At the 2021 Brier, McEwen led the team to a 4–4 record, missing the championship round.

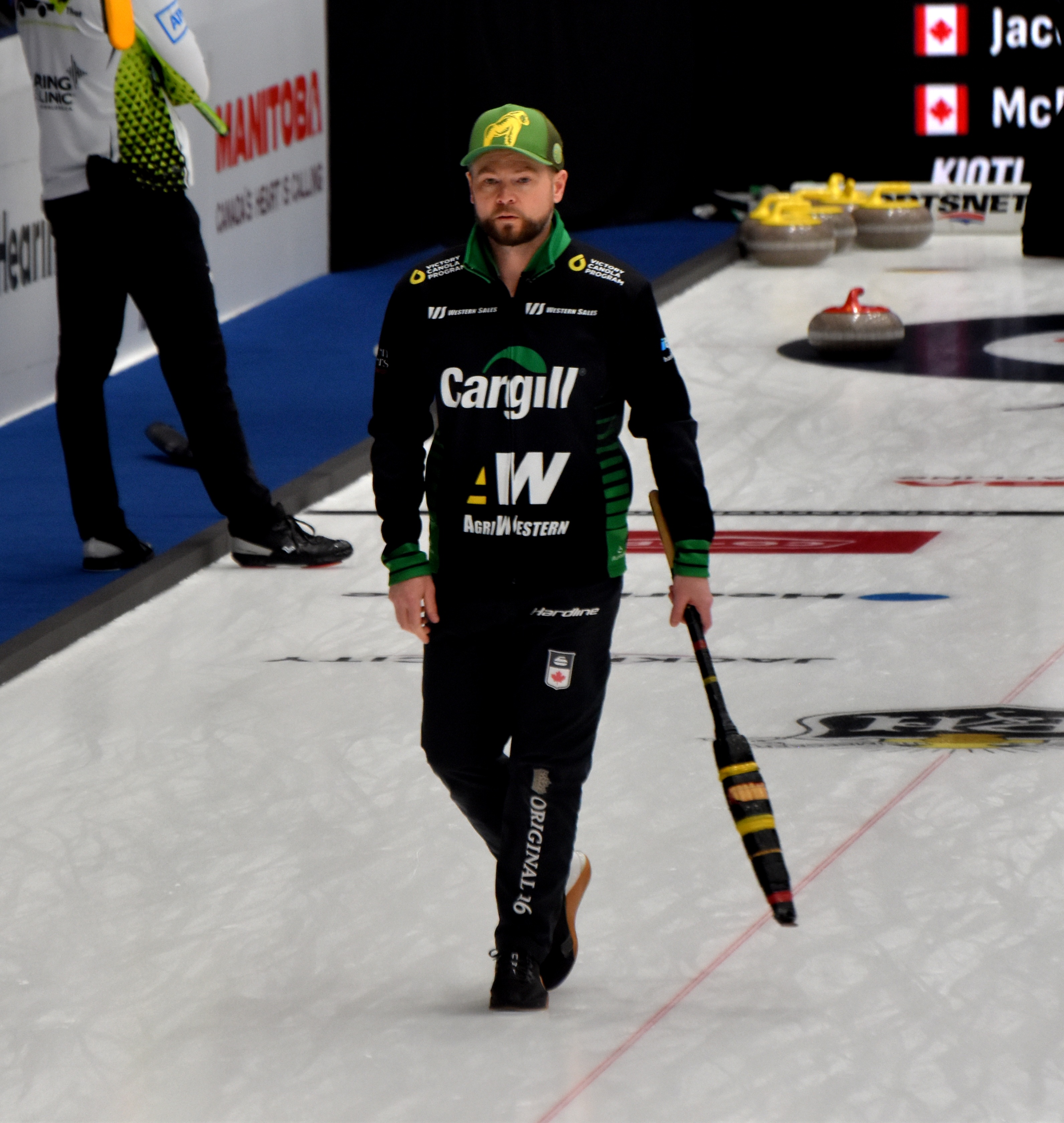
McEwen at the 2026 Players' Championship.

== Personal ==
McEwen's wife is Dawn McEwen (Askin) the former lead for Jennifer Jones. He met his wife while billeting with her family in Ottawa for bonspiels in the late 1990s. They have two daughters, Vienna and Avalon. McEwen attended Crocus Plains Regional Secondary School and Brandon University. McEwen is employed as an entrepreneur.

== Grand Slam record ==
Key
C	Champion
F	Lost in Final
SF	Lost in Semifinal
QF	Lost in Quarterfinals
R16	Lost in the round of 16
Q	Did not advance to playoffs
T2	Played in Tier 2 event
DNP	Did not participate in event
N/A	Not a Grand Slam event that season

Event	2005–06	2006–07	2007–08	2008–09	2009–10	2010–11	2011–12	2012–13	2013–14	2014–15	2015–16	2016–17	2017–18	2018–19	2019–20	2020–21	2021–22	2022–23	2023–24	2024–25	2025–26
Masters	Q	DNP	DNP	Q	DNP	C	QF	QF	Q	F	C	QF	SF	Q	Q	N/A	Q	DNP	Q	Q	Q
Tour Challenge	N/A	N/A	N/A	N/A	N/A	N/A	N/A	N/A	N/A	N/A	SF	QF	DNP	Q	QF	N/A	N/A	T2	T2	SF	Q
The National	DNP	DNP	DNP	QF	QF	QF	Q	F	QF	C	Q	Q	SF	Q	QF	N/A	Q	Q	DNP	SF	QF
Canadian Open	DNP	DNP	DNP	SF	QF	C	C	SF	Q	QF	Q	QF	QF	Q	SF	N/A	N/A	DNP	Q	Q	Q
Players'	DNP	DNP	Q	SF	Q	QF	SF	F	SF	F	SF	F	SF	Q	N/A	DNP	QF	DNP	SF	QF	Q
Champions Cup	N/A	N/A	N/A	N/A	N/A	N/A	N/A	N/A	N/A	N/A	SF	QF	QF	Q	N/A	DNP	DNP	DNP	N/A	N/A	N/A
Elite 10	N/A	N/A	N/A	N/A	N/A	N/A	N/A	N/A	N/A	C	QF	DNP	C	F	N/A	N/A	N/A	N/A	N/A	N/A	N/A

== Teams ==
Season	Skip	Third	Second	Lead
2000–01	Mike McEwen	Denni Neufeld	Geordie Hargreaves	Nolan Thiessen
2001–02	Mike McEwen	Kevin Cooley	Geordie Hargreaves	Don Grainger
2002–03	Mike McEwen	Kevin Cooley	Geordie Hargreaves	Don Grainger
2003–04	James Kirkness	Mike McEwen	Ross McFadyen	A. J. Girardin
2004–05	James Kirkness	Mike McEwen	Ross McFadyen	A. J. Girardin
2005–06	Mike McEwen	Justin Richter	Matt Wozniak	Andrew Melnuk
2006–07	Mike McEwen	Matt Wozniak	Geordie Hargreaves	Adam Guenther
2007–08	Mike McEwen	Matt Wozniak	B. J. Neufeld	Denni Neufeld
2008–09	Mike McEwen	B. J. Neufeld	Matt Wozniak	Denni Neufeld
2009–10	Mike McEwen	B. J. Neufeld	Matt Wozniak	Denni Neufeld
2010–11	Mike McEwen	B. J. Neufeld	Matt Wozniak	Denni Neufeld
2011–12	Mike McEwen	B. J. Neufeld	Matt Wozniak	Denni Neufeld
2012–13	Mike McEwen	B. J. Neufeld	Matt Wozniak	Denni Neufeld
2013–14	Mike McEwen	B. J. Neufeld	Matt Wozniak	Denni Neufeld
2014–15	Mike McEwen	B. J. Neufeld	Matt Wozniak	Denni Neufeld
2015–16	Mike McEwen	B. J. Neufeld	Matt Wozniak	Denni Neufeld
2016–17	Mike McEwen	B. J. Neufeld	Matt Wozniak	Denni Neufeld
2017–18	Mike McEwen	B. J. Neufeld	Matt Wozniak	Denni Neufeld
2018–19	Mike McEwen (Fourth)	Reid Carruthers (Skip)	Derek Samagalski	Colin Hodgson
2019–20	Mike McEwen	Reid Carruthers	Derek Samagalski	Colin Hodgson
2020–21	Mike McEwen	Reid Carruthers	Derek Samagalski	Colin Hodgson
2021–22	Mike McEwen	Reid Carruthers	Derek Samagalski	Colin Hodgson
2022–23	Mike McEwen	Ryan Fry	Brent Laing	Jonathan Beuk (until Jan.); Joey Hart (from Jan.)
2023–24	Mike McEwen	Colton Flasch	Kevin Marsh	Dan Marsh
2024–25	Mike McEwen	Colton Flasch	Kevin Marsh	Dan Marsh
2025–26	Mike McEwen	Colton Flasch	Kevin Marsh	Dan Marsh
2026–27	Mike McEwen	Rylan Kleiter	Joshua Mattern	Trevor Johnson
