= Colin Hodgson =

Canadian curler

- Curler
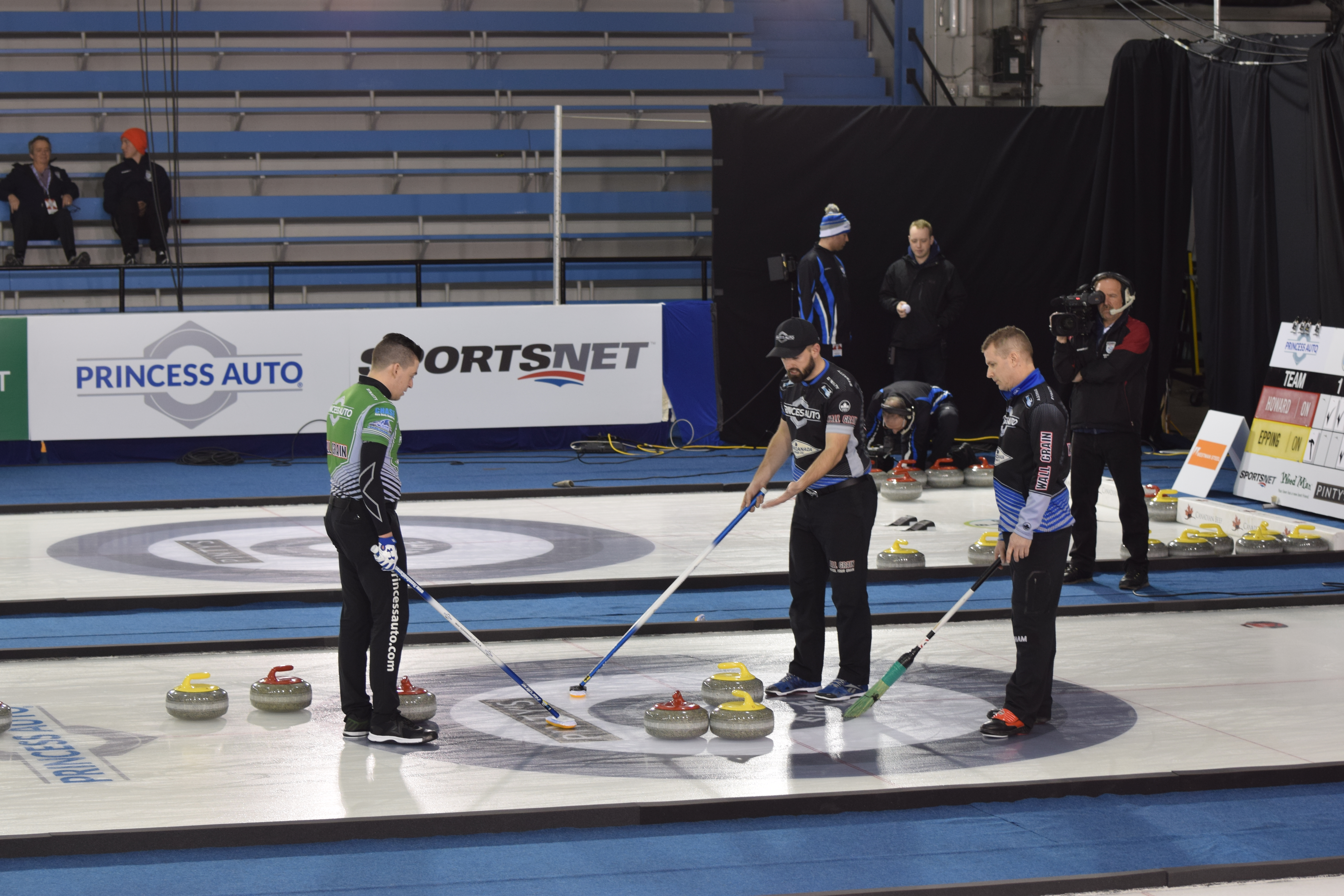
- Hodgson (green) discusses a shot with Carruthers and Jeff Stoughton in 2018.
- Born: June 8, 1990 (age 36); Edmonton, Alberta

Team
- Curling club: Red Lake CC, Red Lake, ON
- Mixed doubles partner: Chelsea Carey

Curling career
- Member Association: Alberta (2007–2014); Manitoba (2014–2022); Northern Ontario (2022–present)
- Brier: 6 (2015, 2018, 2019, 2020, 2021, 2023)
- Top CTRS ranking: 2nd (2016–17)
- Grand Slam victories: 1 (2016 Champions Cup)
Medal record
Men's Curling
Representing Alberta
Canada Winter Games
| Gold medal – first place | 2007 Whitehorse |
Representing Manitoba
Canadian Mixed Doubles Championship
| Bronze medal – third place | 2017 Saskatoon |
| Bronze medal – third place | 2018 Leduc |

Colin Sterling-Wyatt Hodgson (born June 8, 1990) is a Canadian curler originally from Lacombe, Alberta. He is the former lead for Team Mike McEwen and currently plays mixed doubles with Chelsea Carey. He also coaches the Julia Weagle rink.

== Career ==
While briefly living in Calgary, Hodgson's junior years saw him skip the Alberta team at the 2011 Canadian Junior Curling Championships, finishing in sixth place with a 6–6 win–loss record. He also won a gold medal at the 2007 Canada Winter Games.

Hodgson later moved to Airdrie, Alberta and played third for Charley Thomas for a year. Following that season, he moved to Winnipeg and joined Reid Carruthers as the lead on his new team in 2014. The team represented Manitoba at the 2015 Tim Hortons Brier, finishing in 10th place. While at the Brier, he won the Ford Hot Shots competition, taking home a 2015 Ford F-150 XLT. The next season the team won the 2016 Humpty's Champions Cup, Hodgson's first Grand Slam title. Later that year they won the 2016 Canada Cup of Curling.

== Personal life ==
Hodgson was a columnist for The Curling News, and also commentates on CurlingZone. He is trained as a chef and attended the Northern Alberta Institute of Technology and Lacombe Composite High School. He owns his own curling apparel business called "Dynasty Curling Ltd". He currently lives in Balmertown, Ontario. He is married. He is partially colour blind, and keeps track of curling rocks by memorization. He is Métis.
