= 2018 Icebreaker at The Granite =

2018 GOLDLINE Icebreaker at The Granite
- Host city: Winnipeg, Manitoba
- Dates: August 24–26
- Men's winner: (Manitoba) Team Calvert
- Curling club: Deer Lodge CC, Winnipeg
- Skip: Braden Calvert
- Third: Kyle Kurz
- Second: Ian McMillan
- Lead: Rob Gordon
- Finalist: (United States) John Shuster
- Women's winner: (Manitoba) Team Robertson
- Curling club: Assiniboine Memorial CC, Winnipeg
- Skip: Darcy Robertson
- Third: Karen Klein
- Second: Vanessa Foster
- Lead: Theresa Cannon
- Finalist: (Russia) Anna Sidorova

The 2018 GOLDLINE Icebreaker at The Granite was held from August 24 to 26 at the Granite Curling Club in Winnipeg, Manitoba. It was the second event on the World Curling Tour for the 2018–19 season. The men's event was held in a double knockout format and the women's event was held in a round robin format.

On the men's side, Braden Calvert's rink from Winnipeg defeated John Shuster's team from Duluth 4–3 in the final. Team Calvert also won the event the previous season. On the women's side, Team Darcy Robertson also from Winnipeg defeated Russia's Anna Sidorova from Moscow 9–8 in the final. Team Robertson finished runner-up at the event in 2017.

== Men ==
The teams are listed as follows:

=== Teams ===
Skip	Third	Second	Lead	Locale
Braden Calvert	Kyle Kurz	Ian McMillan	Rob Gordon	Winnipeg, Manitoba
Ty Dilello	Hayden Forrester	Brennan Sampson	Brendan Wilson	Winnipeg, Manitoba
Matt Dunstone	Braeden Moskowy	Catlin Schneider	Dustin Kidby	Regina, Saskatchewan
Sean Grassie	Devin McArthur	Lucas Van Den Bosch	Chad Barkman	Winnipeg, Manitoba
Jason Gunnlaugson	Alex Forrest	Denni Neufeld	Connor Njegovan	Winnipeg, Manitoba
Kirk Muyres	Kevin Marsh	Dan Marsh	Dallan Muyres	Saskatoon, Saskatchewan
John Shuster	Chris Plys	Matt Hamilton	John Landsteiner	Duluth, United States
Brett Walter	Chase Dussesoy	Lawson Yates	Liam Tod	Winnipeg, Manitoba

=== Round-robin standings ===
Final round-robin standings

Key
Teams to Playoffs

Pool A	W	L
(Manitoba) Jason Gunnlaugson	3	1
(Manitoba) Braden Calvert	2	2
(Saskatchewan) Kirk Muyres	2	2
(Manitoba) Brett Walter	0	4

Pool B	W	L
(United States) John Shuster	3	1
(Manitoba) Sean Grassie	2	2
(Manitoba) Ty Dilello	2	2
(Saskatchewan) Matt Dunstone	2	2

=== Round-robin results ===
All draw times are listed in Central Time (UTC−06:00).

==== Draw 1 ====
Friday, August 24, 6:00 pm

Sheet 5	1	2	3	4	5	6	7	8	Final
(Manitoba) Jason Gunnlaugson	1	2	3	0	0	1	X	X	7
(Manitoba) Sean Grassie 🔨	0	0	0	1	1	0	X	X	2

Sheet 6	1	2	3	4	5	6	7	8	Final
(Manitoba) Braden Calvert	0	0	0	2	1	0	0	1	4
(Manitoba) Ty Dilello 🔨	0	1	1	0	0	0	3	0	5

Sheet 7	1	2	3	4	5	6	7	8	Final
(Saskatchewan) Kirk Muyres	0	0	2	1	0	1	0	0	4
(Saskatchewan) Matt Dunstone 🔨	0	2	0	0	3	0	0	1	6

Sheet 8	1	2	3	4	5	6	7	8	Final
(Manitoba) Brett Walter	0	1	0	1	0	X	X	X	2
(United States) John Shuster 🔨	1	0	3	0	3	X	X	X	7

==== Draw 2 ====
Friday, August 24, 9:00 pm

Sheet 5	1	2	3	4	5	6	7	8	Final
(Manitoba) Brett Walter 🔨	0	0	0	X	X	X	X	X	0
(Saskatchewan) Matt Dunstone	1	1	5	X	X	X	X	X	7

Sheet 6	1	2	3	4	5	6	7	8	Final
(Saskatchewan) Kirk Muyres	2	0	1	0	2	0	2	X	7
(United States) John Shuster 🔨	0	1	0	0	0	2	0	X	3

Sheet 7	1	2	3	4	5	6	7	8	Final
(Manitoba) Braden Calvert 🔨	2	0	0	0	2	2	0	X	6
(Manitoba) Sean Grassie	0	0	1	0	0	0	1	X	2

Sheet 8	1	2	3	4	5	6	7	8	Final
(Manitoba) Jason Gunnlaugson	1	1	3	0	X	X	X	X	5
(Manitoba) Ty Dilello 🔨	0	0	0	1	X	X	X	X	1

==== Draw 4 ====
Saturday, August 25, 3:30 pm

Sheet 1	1	2	3	4	5	6	7	8	Final
(Manitoba) Jason Gunnlaugson 🔨	1	0	0	0	1	3	0	1	6
(Saskatchewan) Matt Dunstone	0	1	0	1	0	0	2	0	4

Sheet 2	1	2	3	4	5	6	7	8	Final
(Manitoba) Braden Calvert 🔨	0	2	0	1	0	2	X	X	5
(United States) John Shuster	1	0	2	0	5	0	X	X	8

Sheet 3	1	2	3	4	5	6	7	8	Final
(Saskatchewan) Kirk Muyres	0	1	0	1	0	1	0	0	3
(Manitoba) Sean Grassie 🔨	0	0	1	0	1	0	0	2	4

Sheet 4	1	2	3	4	5	6	7	8	Final
(Manitoba) Brett Walter	1	0	0	1	0	1	1	0	4
(Manitoba) Ty Dilello 🔨	0	2	0	0	2	0	0	1	5

==== Draw 5 ====
Saturday, August 25, 7:00 pm

Sheet 5	1	2	3	4	5	6	7	8	Final
(Saskatchewan) Kirk Muyres 🔨	2	1	0	0	0	4	X	X	7
(Manitoba) Ty Dilello	0	0	0	0	0	0	X	X	0

Sheet 6	1	2	3	4	5	6	7	8	Final
(Manitoba) Brett Walter	0	2	1	0	1	0	0	X	4
(Manitoba) Sean Grassie 🔨	3	0	0	3	0	1	2	X	9

Sheet 7	1	2	3	4	5	6	7	8	Final
(Manitoba) Jason Gunnlaugson	2	0	0	1	0	0	1	1	5
(United States) John Shuster 🔨	0	3	0	0	2	1	0	0	6

Sheet 8	1	2	3	4	5	6	7	8	Final
(Manitoba) Braden Calvert 🔨	1	0	0	1	0	2	0	1	5
(Saskatchewan) Matt Dunstone	0	0	1	0	1	0	1	0	3

=== Playoffs ===
Semifinals
1	(United States) John Shuster	5
4	(Manitoba) Sean Graisse	3
2	(Manitoba) Jason Gunnlaugson	2
3	(Manitoba) Braden Calvert	7

Final
1	(United States) John Shuster	3
3	(Manitoba) Braden Calvert	4

==== Semifinals ====
Sunday, August 26, 12:00 pm

Team	1	2	3	4	5	6	7	8	Final
(United States) John Shuster 🔨	1	1	0	0	2	0	1	0	5
(Manitoba) Sean Graisse	0	0	1	0	0	1	0	1	3

Team	1	2	3	4	5	6	7	8	Final
(Manitoba) Jason Gunnlaugson 🔨	1	0	1	0	0	X	X	X	2
(Manitoba) Braden Calvert	0	2	0	3	2	X	X	X	7

==== Final ====
Sunday, August 26, 3:00 pm

Team	1	2	3	4	5	6	7	8	Final
(United States) John Shuster 🔨	0	0	0	0	0	0	3	0	3
(Manitoba) Braden Calvert	0	0	0	1	0	2	0	1	4

== Women ==
The teams are listed as follows:

=== Teams ===
Skip	Third	Second	Lead	Locale
Kaitlyn Bowman	Ashley Becker	Ashley Green	Jade Bloor	Weyburn, Saskatchewan
Katie Chappellaz	Kristin McLellan	Kortney Teale	Lorelle Pegus	Brandon, Manitoba
Cory Christensen	Vicky Persinger	Jenna Martin	Madison Bear	(United States) Blaine, Minnesota
Kerri Einarson	Val Sweeting	Shannon Birchard	Briane Meilleur	Gimli, Manitoba
Allison Flaxey	Kate Cameron	Taylor McDonald	Raunora Westcott	Winnipeg, Manitoba
Tracy Fleury	Selena Njegovan	Liz Fyfe	Kristin MacCuish	East St. Paul, Manitoba
Sherry Just	Hanna Anderson	Ellen Redlick	Kimberly Osemlak	Saskatoon, Saskatchewan
Beth Peterson	Jenna Loder	Katherine Doerksen	Melissa Gordon	Winnipeg, Manitoba
Darcy Robertson	Karen Klein	Vanessa Foster	Theresa Cannon	Winnipeg, Manitoba
Anna Sidorova	Margarita Fomina	Alexandra Raeva	Nkeirouka Ezekh	Moscow, Russia

=== Round-robin standings ===
Final round-robin standings

Key
Teams to Playoffs

Pool A	W	L
(Russia) Anna Sidorova	3	1
(Manitoba) Allison Flaxey	3	1
(Manitoba) Tracy Fleury	3	1
(Manitoba) Katie Chappellaz	1	3
(Saskatchewan) Sherry Just	0	4

Pool B	W	L
(Manitoba) Darcy Robertson	4	0
(United States) Cory Christensen	3	1
(Manitoba) Kerri Einarson	2	2
(Manitoba) Beth Peterson	1	3
(Saskatchewan) Kaitlyn Bowman	0	4

=== Round-robin results ===
All draw times are listed in Central Time (UTC−06:00).

==== Draw 1 ====
Friday, August 24, 6:00 pm

Sheet 1	1	2	3	4	5	6	7	8	Final
(Manitoba) Tracy Fleury	0	0	1	0	2	0	1	2	6
(Saskatchewan) Sherry Just 🔨	0	3	0	1	0	1	0	0	5

Sheet 2	1	2	3	4	5	6	7	8	Final
(Manitoba) Allison Flaxey 🔨	0	2	1	0	1	2	0	X	6
(Manitoba) Katie Chappellaz	0	0	0	1	0	0	2	X	3

Sheet 3	1	2	3	4	5	6	7	8	Final
(Manitoba) Kerri Einarson 🔨	1	3	0	3	0	2	X	X	9
(Saskatchewan) Kaitlyn Bowman	0	0	1	0	1	0	X	X	2

Sheet 4	1	2	3	4	5	6	7	8	9	Final
(Manitoba) Darcy Robertson	0	1	1	1	0	1	0	1	1	6
(Manitoba) Beth Peterson 🔨	1	0	0	0	2	0	2	0	0	5

==== Draw 2 ====
Friday, August 24, 9:00 pm

Sheet 1	1	2	3	4	5	6	7	8	Final
(United States) Cory Christensen	0	0	1	5	0	2	0	X	8
(Saskatchewan) Kaitlyn Bowman 🔨	1	2	0	0	1	0	1	X	5

Sheet 2	1	2	3	4	5	6	7	8	Final
(Manitoba) Kerri Einarson	0	4	3	0	3	X	X	X	10
(Manitoba) Beth Peterson 🔨	1	0	0	2	0	X	X	X	3

Sheet 3	1	2	3	4	5	6	7	8	Final
(Russia) Anna Sidorova	1	1	0	1	0	4	2	X	9
(Saskatchewan) Sherry Just 🔨	0	0	1	0	1	0	0	X	2

Sheet 4	1	2	3	4	5	6	7	8	Final
(Manitoba) Tracy Fleury	1	3	0	0	0	1	0	X	6
(Manitoba) Katie Chappellaz 🔨	0	0	0	1	0	0	1	X	2

==== Draw 3 ====
Saturday, August 25, 12:00 pm

Sheet 5	1	2	3	4	5	6	7	8	Final
(Manitoba) Tracy Fleury	1	0	2	1	0	1	0	1	6
(Russia) Anna Sidorova 🔨	0	1	0	0	2	0	1	0	4

Sheet 6	1	2	3	4	5	6	7	8	Final
(Manitoba) Allison Flaxey	0	2	1	0	3	3	X	X	9
(Saskatchewan) Sherry Just 🔨	1	0	0	1	0	0	X	X	2

Sheet 7	1	2	3	4	5	6	7	8	Final
(Manitoba) Kerri Einarson 🔨	0	0	1	0	0	0	2	0	3
(United States) Cory Christensen	1	0	0	1	0	1	0	1	4

Sheet 8	1	2	3	4	5	6	7	8	Final
(Manitoba) Darcy Robertson 🔨	1	3	4	2	X	X	X	X	10
(Saskatchewan) Kaitlyn Bowman	0	0	0	0	X	X	X	X	0

==== Draw 4 ====
Saturday, August 25, 3:30 pm

Sheet 5	1	2	3	4	5	6	7	8	Final
(Manitoba) Beth Peterson 🔨	0	2	0	0	3	1	1	X	7
(Saskatchewan) Kaitlyn Bowman	0	0	2	3	0	0	0	X	5

Sheet 6	1	2	3	4	5	6	7	8	Final
(Manitoba) Darcy Robertson 🔨	1	1	0	4	0	2	0	X	8
(United States) Cory Christensen	0	0	1	0	2	0	1	X	4

Sheet 7	1	2	3	4	5	6	7	8	Final
(Manitoba) Katie Chappellaz	2	0	0	0	4	1	X	X	7
(Saskatchewan) Sherry Just 🔨	0	1	1	1	0	0	X	X	3

Sheet 8	1	2	3	4	5	6	7	8	Final
(Manitoba) Allison Flaxey 🔨	0	0	0	0	0	2	0	X	2
(Russia) Anna Sidorova	0	1	1	1	1	0	1	X	5

==== Draw 5 ====
Saturday, August 25, 7:00 pm

Sheet 1	1	2	3	4	5	6	7	8	Final
(Russia) Anna Sidorova 🔨	1	2	1	0	0	1	1	X	6
(Manitoba) Katie Chappellaz	0	0	0	1	1	0	0	X	2

Sheet 2	1	2	3	4	5	6	7	8	Final
(Manitoba) Tracy Fleury	0	0	0	1	0	0	0	0	1
(Manitoba) Allison Flaxey 🔨	0	0	0	0	0	0	0	3	3

Sheet 3	1	2	3	4	5	6	7	8	Final
(United States) Cory Christensen	0	4	1	3	X	X	X	X	8
(Manitoba) Beth Peterson 🔨	1	0	0	0	X	X	X	X	1

Sheet 4	1	2	3	4	5	6	7	8	Final
(Manitoba) Kerri Einarson	1	0	0	1	0	1	0	1	4
(Manitoba) Darcy Robertson 🔨	0	2	1	0	1	0	1	0	5

=== Playoffs ===
Quarterfinal
4	(Manitoba) Tracy Fleury	4
5	(United States) Cory Christensen	7

Semifinals
1	(Manitoba) Darcy Robertson	7
5	(United States) Cory Christensen	4
2	(Russia) Anna Sidorova	8
3	(Manitoba) Allison Flaxey	3

Final
1	(Manitoba) Darcy Robertson	9
2	(Russia) Anna Sidorova	8

==== Quarterfinal ====
Sunday, August 26, 9:00 am

Team	1	2	3	4	5	6	7	8	Final
(Manitoba) Tracy Fleury	0	0	1	0	1	0	2	0	4
(United States) Cory Christensen 🔨	0	2	0	2	0	2	0	1	7

==== Semifinals ====
Sunday, August 26, 12:00 pm

Team	1	2	3	4	5	6	7	8	Final
(Manitoba) Darcy Robertson 🔨	0	1	0	3	0	0	3	X	7
(United States) Cory Christensen	0	0	1	0	2	1	0	X	4

Team	1	2	3	4	5	6	7	8	Final
(Russia) Anna Sidorova	0	3	3	0	1	1	X	X	8
(Manitoba) Allison Flaxey 🔨	1	0	0	2	0	0	X	X	3

==== Final ====
Sunday, August 26, 3:00 pm

Team	1	2	3	4	5	6	7	8	Final
(Manitoba) Darcy Robertson 🔨	4	0	1	0	2	0	1	1	9
(Russia) Anna Sidorova	0	3	0	3	0	2	0	0	8
