= Icebreaker Challenge =

- Established: 2015
- Host city: Morris, Manitoba
- Arena: Morris Curling Club
- Men's purse: $4,800
- Women's purse: $4,000

Current champions (2026)
- Men: (United States) Caden Hebert
- Women: (Alberta) Selena Sturmay

The Icebreaker Challenge is an annual cashspiel, or curling tournament, that takes place in Manitoba. The Event was part of the World Curling Tour from 2017 to 2019. The 2016 event was known as the 2016 Performance Spider Midweek Special and was held in Waterloo, Ontario and was only part of the Ontario Curling Tour. The 2016 event included both genders, and in 2017 a separate women's event was added. Both the 2017 and 2018 events were held at the Granite Curling Club in Winnipeg. The 2017 event was known as the Spider Performance Icebreaker At The Granite and in 2018 it was known as the GOLDLINE Icebreaker At The Granite. Beginning in 2019 the event is being held at the Morris Curling Club in Morris, Manitoba. After a four-season hiatus, the event returned in 2023 with only a women's field. In 2024, both a men's and women's event were contested.

== Past champions ==
=== Men ===
Year	Winning team	Runner-up team	Purse (CDN)
2016	(Manitoba) Jason Gunnlaugson, Colton Lott, Kyle Doering, Rob Gordon	(Manitoba) William Lyburn, Jared Kolomaya, Richard Daneault, Braden Zawada	$4,000
2017	(Manitoba) Braden Calvert, Kyle Kurz, Lucas Van Den Bosch, Brendan Wilson	(United States) John Shuster, Tyler George, Joe Polo, John Landsteiner	$7,680
2018	(Manitoba) Braden Calvert, Kyle Kurz, Ian McMillan, Rob Gordon	(United States) John Shuster, Christopher Plys, Matt Hamilton, John Landsteiner	$5,120
2019	(Manitoba) Jason Gunnlaugson, Alex Forrest, Adam Casey, Connor Njegovan	(Manitoba) Ty Dilello, Hayden Forrester, Brennan Sampson, Brendan Wilson	$5,120
2024	(United States) Chase Sinnett, Samuel Strouse, Kevin Tuma, Connor Kauffman	(United States) Ethan Sampson, Coleman Thurston, Jacob Zeman, Marius Kleinas	$4,500
2025	(United States) Samuel Strouse (Fourth), Kevin Tuma, Chase Sinnett (Skip), Connor Kauffman	(United States) Caden Hebert, Jackson Bestland, Benji Paral, Jack Wendtland	$4,000
2026	(United States) Caden Hebert, Jackson Bestland, Benji Paral, Jack Wendtland	(United States) Scott Dunnam, Cody Clouser, Alex Leichter, Andrew Dunnam	$4,800

=== Women ===
Year	Winning team	Runner-up team	Purse (CDN)
2017	(Manitoba) Kerri Einarson, Selena Kaatz, Liz Fyfe, Kristin MacCuish	(Manitoba) Darcy Robertson, Karen Klein, Vanessa Foster, Theresa Cannon	$6,020
2018	(Manitoba) Darcy Robertson, Karen Klein, Vanessa Foster, Theresa Cannon	(Russia) Anna Sidorova, Margarita Fomina, Alexandra Raeva, Nkeiruka Ezekh	$6,400
2019	(Manitoba) Tracy Fleury, Selena Njegovan, Liz Fyfe, Kristin MacCuish	(Japan) Tori Koana, Yuna Kotani, Mao Ishigaki, Arisa Kotani	$6,400
2023	(Manitoba) Kate Cameron, Meghan Walter, Taylor McDonald, Mackenzie Elias	(United States) Delaney Strouse, Anne O'Hara, Sydney Mullaney, Rebecca Rodgers	$6,500
2024	(Saskatchewan) Ashley Thevenot, Brittany Tran, Taylor Stremick, Kaylin Skinner	(Alberta) Kayla Skrlik, Margot Flemming, Ashton Skrlik, Geri-Lynn Ramsay	$4,500
2025	(British Columbia) Kayla MacMillan, Brittany Tran, Lindsay Dubue, Lauren Lenentine	(Manitoba) Kate Cameron, Briane Harris, Taylor McDonald, Mackenzie Elias	$4,000
2026	(Alberta) Selena Sturmay, Danielle Schmiemann, Dezaray Hawes, Paige Papley	(Alberta) Serena Gray-Withers, Catherine Clifford, Laura Walker, Zoe Cinnamon	$4,000
