= 2019 Canadian Open (curling) =

Grand Slam of Curling event

2019 Meridian Canadian Open
- Host city: North Battleford, Saskatchewan
- Arena: Civic Centre
- Dates: January 8–13
- Men's winner: (Alberta) Brendan Bottcher
- Curling club: Saville Community SC, Edmonton, AB
- Skip: Brendan Bottcher
- Third: Darren Moulding
- Second: Brad Thiessen
- Lead: Karrick Martin
- Finalist: (Ontario) John Epping
- Women's winner: (Ontario) Rachel Homan
- Curling club: Ottawa CC, Ottawa, Ontario
- Skip: Rachel Homan
- Third: Emma Miskew
- Second: Joanne Courtney
- Lead: Lisa Weagle
- Coach: Marcel Rocque
- Finalist: (Switzerland) Silvana Tirinzoni

The 2019 Meridian Canadian Open was held from January 8 to 13 at the Civic Centre in North Battleford, Saskatchewan. This will be the fifth Grand Slam event and third "major" of the 2018–19 curling season.

On the men’s side, Brendan Bottcher of Edmonton defeated John Epping of Toronto 6-3 in seven ends to win his first Grand Slam. On the women’s side, Rachel Homan of Ottawa edged Silvana Tirinzoni of Aarau 4-3 to win her tenth slam. With the win, Homan passed Jennifer Jones for most career Grand Slam wins, excluding defunct slams. It was also Homan's third straight slam win of the season.

== Qualification ==
Sixteen teams compete in the Canadian Open, including the seven top-ranked teams on the World Curling Tour's Order of Merit rankings as of December 3, 2018, the seven top teams on the Year-to-Date rankings as of December 3, the Tier 2 winner of the 2018 Tour Challenge, and a sponsor's exemption.

=== Men ===
Top men's teams as of December 3:

#	Order of Merit	Year-to-Date
1	1. (Sweden) Niklas Edin	1. (Alberta) Kevin Koe
2	2. (Newfoundland and Labrador) Brad Gushue	2. (Ontario) John Epping
3	3. (Alberta) ~~Kevin Koe~~; 4. (Scotland) Bruce Mouat	3. (Sweden) ~~Niklas Edin~~; 4. (Alberta) Brendan Bottcher
4	5. (Ontario) ~~John Epping~~; 6. (Alberta) ~~Brendan Bottcher~~; 7. (Ontario) Brad Jacobs	5. (Saskatchewan) Matt Dunstone
5	8. (Switzerland) Peter de Cruz	6. (Ontario) Glenn Howard
6	9. (Ontario) ~~Glenn Howard~~; 10. (Manitoba) Reid Carruthers	7. (Scotland) ~~Bruce Mouat~~; 8. (Ontario) ~~Brad Jacobs~~; 9. (Switzerland) ~~Peter de Cruz~~; 10. (Ontario) Scott McDonald
7	11. (Saskatchewan) ~~Matt Dunstone~~; 12. (Manitoba) Jason Gunnlaugson	11. (Newfoundland and Labrador) ~~Brad Gushue~~; 12. (Manitoba) Braden Calvert

Sponsor's exemption:

- (Saskatchewan) Rylan Kleiter

Tour Challenge Tier 2 winner:

- (Saskatchewan) Kirk Muyres

=== Women ===
Top women's teams as of December 3:

#	Order of Merit	Year-to-Date
1	1. (Sweden) Anna Hasselborg	1. (Sweden) ~~Anna Hasselborg~~; 2. (Manitoba) Kerri Einarson
2	2. (Ontario) Rachel Homan	3. (Ontario) ~~Rachel Homan~~; 4. (Switzerland) Silvana Tirinzoni
3	3. (Manitoba) Jennifer Jones	5. (Manitoba) ~~Jennifer Jones~~; 6. (Japan) ~~Sayaka Yoshimura~~
4	4. (Manitoba) ~~Kerri Einarson~~; 5. (Switzerland) ~~Silvana Tirinzoni~~; 6. (Manitoba) Tracy Fleury	7. (Manitoba) Darcy Robertson
5	7. (Manitoba) ~~Darcy Robertson~~; 8. (Alberta) Chelsea Carey	8. (Russia) ~~Alina Kovaleva~~
6	9. (Alberta) Laura Walker	9. (Manitoba) ~~Tracy Fleury~~; 10. (Alberta) ~~Chelsea Carey~~; 11. (Alberta) Casey Scheidegger
7	10. (Japan) Satsuki Fujisawa	12. (Saskatchewan) ~~Robyn Silvernagle~~
8	11. (Alberta) ~~Casey Scheidegger~~; 12. (United States) Nina Roth	13. (Switzerland) ~~Elena Stern~~
9	13. (Scotland) Eve Muirhead	14. (Sweden) Isabella Wranå

Sponsor's exemption:

- (Saskatchewan) Robyn Silvernagle

Tour Challenge Tier 2 winner:

- (Switzerland) Elena Stern

== Men ==
=== Teams ===
Skip	Third	Second	Lead	Locale
Brendan Bottcher	Darren Moulding	Brad Thiessen	Karrick Martin	Edmonton, Alberta
Braden Calvert	Kyle Kurz	Ian McMillan	Rob Gordon	Winnipeg, Manitoba
Reid Carruthers	Mike McEwen	Derek Samagalski	Colin Hodgson	Winnipeg, Manitoba
Benoît Schwarz (Fourth)	Sven Michel	Peter de Cruz (Skip)	Valentin Tanner	Geneva, Switzerland
Matt Dunstone	Braeden Moskowy	Catlin Schneider	Dustin Kidby	Regina, Saskatchewan
Niklas Edin	Oskar Eriksson	Rasmus Wranå	Christoffer Sundgren	Karlstad, Sweden
John Epping	Matt Camm	Brent Laing	Craig Savill	Toronto, Ontario
Jason Gunnlaugson	Alex Forrest	Denni Neufeld	Connor Njegovan	Winnipeg, Manitoba
Brad Gushue	Mark Nichols	Brett Gallant	Geoff Walker	St. John's, Newfoundland and Labrador
Glenn Howard	Scott Howard	David Mathers	Tim March	Penetanguishene, Ontario
Brad Jacobs	Ryan Fry	E. J. Harnden	Ryan Harnden	Sault Ste. Marie, Ontario
Trevor Johnson (Fourth)	Rylan Kleiter (Skip)	Joshua Mattern	Matthieu Taillon	Saskatoon Saskatchewan
Kevin Koe	B. J. Neufeld	Colton Flasch	Ben Hebert	Calgary, Alberta
Scott McDonald	Jonathan Beuk	Wesley Forget	Scott Chadwick	Kingston, Ontario
Bruce Mouat	Grant Hardie	Bobby Lammie	Hammy McMillan Jr.	Edinburgh, Scotland
Kirk Muyres	Kevin Marsh	Dan Marsh	Dallan Muyres	Saskatoon, Saskatchewan

=== Knockout brackets ===
==== A Event ====
A Event			Semifinals			Qualifier 1
1	(Alberta) Kevin Koe	10
1	(Saskatchewan) Rylan Kleiter	1	9	(Alberta) Kevin Koe	4
2	(Ontario) Brad Jacobs	5	9	(Switzerland) Peter de Cruz	6
2	(Switzerland) Peter de Cruz	6				13	(Switzerland) Peter de Cruz	5
3	(Alberta) Brendan Bottcher	8				13	(Alberta) Brendan Bottcher	9
3	(Manitoba) Reid Carruthers	4	10	(Alberta) Brendan Bottcher	6
4	(Saskatchewan) Matt Dunstone	5	10	(Saskatchewan) Matt Dunstone	3
4	(Manitoba) Braden Calvert	4

A Event			Semifinals			Qualifier 2
5	(Ontario) John Epping	8
5	(Saskatchewan) Kirk Muyres	1	11	(Ontario) John Epping	3
6	(Scotland) Bruce Mouat	8	11	(Scotland) Bruce Mouat	6
6	(Ontario) Scott McDonald	5				14	(Scotland) Bruce Mouat	4
7	(Sweden) Niklas Edin	7				14	(Ontario) Glenn Howard	3
7	(Manitoba) Jason Gunnlaugson	6	12	(Sweden) Niklas Edin	2
8	(Ontario) Glenn Howard	5	12	(Ontario) Glenn Howard	4
8	(Newfoundland and Labrador) Brad Gushue	4

==== B Event ====
B Event			Semifinals			Qualifier 3
15	(Saskatchewan) Rylan Kleiter	3
15	(Ontario) Brad Jacobs	7	19	(Ontario) Brad Jacobs	7
16	(Manitoba) Reid Carruthers	6	19	(Manitoba) Braden Calvert	6
16	(Manitoba) Braden Calvert	7				23	(Ontario) Brad Jacobs	3
						23	(Ontario) Glenn Howard	5

B Event			Semifinals			Qualifier 4
17	(Saskatchewan) Kirk Muyres	3
17	(Ontario) Scott McDonald	8	20	(Ontario) Scott McDonald	3
18	(Manitoba) Jason Gunnlaugson	3	20	(Newfoundland and Labrador) Brad Gushue	5
18	(Newfoundland and Labrador) Brad Gushue	4				24	(Newfoundland and Labrador) Brad Gushue	4
						24	(Switzerland) Peter de Cruz	2

B Event			Qualifier 5
21	(Alberta) Kevin Koe	6
21	(Saskatchewan) Matt Dunstone	2	25	(Alberta) Kevin Koe	7
22	(Ontario) John Epping	4	25	(Sweden) Niklas Edin	2
22	(Sweden) Niklas Edin	8

==== C Event ====
C Event			Semifinals			Qualifier 6
26	(Saskatchewan) Rylan Kleiter	3
26	(Manitoba) Reid Carruthers	5	28	(Manitoba) Reid Carruthers	3
			28	(Ontario) John Epping	4
						31	(Ontario) John Epping	5
						31	(Switzerland) Peter de Cruz	3

C Event			Semifinals			Qualifier 7
27	(Saskatchewan) Kirk Muyres	3
27	(Manitoba) Jason Gunnlaugson	9	29	(Manitoba) Jason Gunnlaugson	2
			29	(Saskatchewan) Matt Dunstone	10
						32	(Saskatchewan) Matt Dunstone	2
						32	(Ontario) Brad Jacobs	8

C Event			Qualifier 8
30	(Manitoba) Braden Calvert	8
30	(Ontario) Scott McDonald	5	33	(Manitoba) Braden Calvert	5
			33	(Sweden) Niklas Edin	7

=== Knockout results ===
==== Draw 1 ====
Tuesday, January 8, 7:00 pm

Sheet A	1	2	3	4	5	6	7	8	Final
(Alberta) Kevin Koe	1	1	0	6	2	X	X	X	10
(Saskatchewan) Rylan Kleiter 🔨	0	0	1	0	0	X	X	X	1

Sheet B	1	2	3	4	5	6	7	8	Final
(Ontario) John Epping 🔨	2	3	1	0	2	X	X	X	8
(Saskatchewan) Kirk Muyres	0	0	0	1	0	X	X	X	1

Sheet C	1	2	3	4	5	6	7	8	Final
(Scotland) Bruce Mouat 🔨	1	0	0	2	0	2	0	3	8
(Ontario) Scott McDonald	0	2	1	0	1	0	1	0	5

Sheet D	1	2	3	4	5	6	7	8	Final
(Sweden) Niklas Edin 🔨	1	0	2	0	0	1	0	3	7
(Manitoba) Jason Gunnlaugson	0	3	0	0	0	0	3	0	6

Sheet E	1	2	3	4	5	6	7	8	9	Final
(Ontario) Glenn Howard 🔨	0	0	2	0	0	0	2	0	1	5
(Newfoundland and Labrador) Brad Gushue	0	1	0	0	2	0	0	1	0	4

==== Draw 2 ====
Wednesday, January 9, 8:00 am

Sheet C	1	2	3	4	5	6	7	8	Final
(Alberta) Brendan Bottcher 🔨	3	0	0	2	0	0	2	1	8
(Manitoba) Reid Carruthers	0	0	2	0	0	2	0	0	4

==== Draw 3 ====
Wednesday, January 9, 11:30 am

Sheet A	1	2	3	4	5	6	7	8	Final
(Ontario) Brad Jacobs	0	0	1	0	1	0	3	0	5
(Switzerland) Peter de Cruz 🔨	0	2	0	1	0	2	0	1	6

Sheet C	1	2	3	4	5	6	7	8	Final
(Saskatchewan) Matt Dunstone 🔨	0	3	0	0	0	0	0	2	5
(Manitoba) Braden Calvert	2	0	0	1	0	1	0	0	4

==== Draw 4 ====
Wednesday, January 9, 3:00 pm

Sheet B	1	2	3	4	5	6	7	8	Final
(Sweden) Niklas Edin	0	1	0	0	1	0	0	X	2
(Ontario) Glenn Howard 🔨	1	0	0	1	0	1	1	X	4

Sheet C	1	2	3	4	5	6	7	8	9	Final
(Manitoba) Jason Gunnlaugson	1	0	0	1	0	0	0	1	0	3
(Newfoundland and Labrador) Brad Gushue 🔨	0	0	2	0	0	0	1	0	1	4

Sheet D	1	2	3	4	5	6	7	8	Final
(Ontario) John Epping	1	0	0	0	0	2	0	X	3
(Scotland) Bruce Mouat 🔨	0	0	3	1	0	0	2	X	6

Sheet E	1	2	3	4	5	6	7	8	Final
(Saskatchewan) Kirk Muyres 🔨	0	2	0	1	0	0	X	X	3
(Ontario) Scott McDonald	0	0	5	0	2	1	X	X	8

==== Draw 5 ====
Wednesday, January 9, 7:00 pm

Sheet B	1	2	3	4	5	6	7	8	Final
(Alberta) Brendan Bottcher 🔨	1	0	1	1	0	2	0	1	6
(Saskatchewan) Matt Dunstone	0	2	0	0	1	0	0	0	3

Sheet C	1	2	3	4	5	6	7	8	Final
(Saskatchewan) Rylan Kleiter	0	1	0	2	0	0	0	X	3
(Ontario) Brad Jacobs 🔨	1	0	1	0	3	0	2	X	7

Sheet E	1	2	3	4	5	6	7	8	Final
(Alberta) Kevin Koe 🔨	2	0	0	0	2	0	0	0	4
(Switzerland) Peter de Cruz	0	0	2	1	0	0	2	1	6

==== Draw 7 ====
Thursday, January 10, 11:30 am

Sheet A	1	2	3	4	5	6	7	8	9	Final
(Manitoba) Reid Carruthers 🔨	0	2	0	0	0	2	0	2	0	6
(Manitoba) Braden Calvert	2	0	0	1	0	0	3	0	1	7

Sheet B	1	2	3	4	5	6	7	8	Final
(Ontario) Scott McDonald	1	0	1	0	0	1	0	X	3
(Newfoundland and Labrador) Brad Gushue 🔨	0	1	0	0	2	0	2	X	5

Sheet C	1	2	3	4	5	6	7	8	Final
(Scotland) Bruce Mouat 🔨	2	0	0	0	0	0	0	2	4
(Ontario) Glenn Howard	0	2	0	1	0	0	0	0	3

Sheet D	1	2	3	4	5	6	7	8	Final
(Switzerland) Peter de Cruz	0	2	0	1	0	1	1	0	5
(Alberta) Brendan Bottcher 🔨	4	0	1	0	1	0	0	3	9

==== Draw 9 ====
Thursday, January 10, 7:00 pm

Sheet B	1	2	3	4	5	6	7	8	Final
(Saskatchewan) Kirk Muyres	0	1	0	1	0	1	0	X	3
(Manitoba) Jason Gunnlaugson 🔨	1	0	4	0	1	0	3	X	9

Sheet C	1	2	3	4	5	6	7	8	Final
(Alberta) Kevin Koe	1	0	1	0	1	0	0	3	6
(Saskatchewan) Matt Dunstone 🔨	0	1	0	1	0	0	0	0	2

Sheet D	1	2	3	4	5	6	7	8	Final
(Ontario) John Epping 🔨	1	0	0	1	0	2	0	X	4
(Sweden) Niklas Edin	0	0	2	0	3	0	3	X	8

Sheet E	1	2	3	4	5	6	7	8	Final
(Ontario) Brad Jacobs 🔨	1	0	2	0	2	0	2	X	7
(Manitoba) Braden Calvert	0	2	0	1	0	2	0	1	6

==== Draw 10 ====
Friday, January 11, 8:00 am

Sheet D	1	2	3	4	5	6	7	8	Final
(Saskatchewan) Rylan Kleiter 🔨	1	0	0	1	0	0	0	1	3
(Manitoba) Reid Carruthers	0	3	0	0	0	0	2	0	5

==== Draw 11 ====
Friday, January 11, 11:30 am

Sheet A	1	2	3	4	5	6	7	8	Final
(Manitoba) Braden Calvert 🔨	1	0	0	2	1	3	0	1	8
(Ontario) Scott McDonald	0	2	1	0	0	0	2	0	5

Sheet E	1	2	3	4	5	6	7	8	Final
(Manitoba) Jason Gunnlaugson	0	1	0	1	0	X	X	X	2
(Saskatchewan) Matt Dunstone 🔨	3	0	4	0	3	X	X	X	10

==== Draw 12 ====
Friday, January 11, 3:00 pm

Sheet B	1	2	3	4	5	6	7	8	Final
(Alberta) Kevin Koe	0	0	2	0	5	X	X	X	7
(Sweden) Niklas Edin 🔨	1	0	0	1	0	X	X	X	2

Sheet C	1	2	3	4	5	6	7	8	Final
(Manitoba) Reid Carruthers	0	0	1	0	0	0	1	1	3
(Ontario) John Epping 🔨	1	0	0	0	0	3	0	0	4

==== Draw 13 ====
Friday, January 11, 6:30 pm

Sheet B	1	2	3	4	5	6	7	8	Final
(Ontario) Brad Jacobs	0	1	0	1	0	1	0	0	3
(Ontario) Glenn Howard 🔨	1	0	1	0	2	0	0	1	5

Sheet D	1	2	3	4	5	6	7	8	Final
(Newfoundland and Labrador) Brad Gushue 🔨	0	2	0	2	0	0	0	1	4
(Switzerland) Peter de Cruz	0	0	1	0	0	1	0	0	2

==== Draw 14 ====
Saturday, January 12, 8:00 am

Sheet B	1	2	3	4	5	6	7	8	Final
(Ontario) John Epping 🔨	1	0	0	2	0	2	0	X	5
(Switzerland) Peter de Cruz	0	1	0	0	1	0	1	X	3

Sheet C	1	2	3	4	5	6	7	8	Final
(Manitoba) Braden Calvert 🔨	1	1	0	2	0	1	0	0	5
(Sweden) Niklas Edin	0	0	2	0	2	0	2	1	7

Sheet D	1	2	3	4	5	6	7	8	Final
(Saskatchewan) Matt Dunstone 🔨	0	0	1	0	1	0	0	X	2
(Ontario) Brad Jacobs	0	2	0	2	0	0	4	X	8

=== Playoffs ===
Quarterfinals
A1	(Alberta) Brendan Bottcher	5
C2	(Ontario) Brad Jacobs	2
B2	(Newfoundland and Labrador) Brad Gushue	6
B1	(Ontario) Glenn Howard	2
A2	(Scotland) Bruce Mouat	4
C3	(Sweden) Niklas Edin	5
B3	(Alberta) Kevin Koe	4
C1	(Ontario) John Epping	6

Semifinals
A1	(Alberta) Brendan Bottcher	6
B2	(Newfoundland and Labrador) Brad Gushue	5
C3	(Sweden) Niklas Edin	1
C1	(Ontario) John Epping	9

Final
A1	(Alberta) Brendan Bottcher	6
C1	(Ontario) John Epping	3

==== Quarterfinals ====
Saturday, January 12, 3:00 pm

Sheet A	1	2	3	4	5	6	7	8	9	Final
(Scotland) Bruce Mouat 🔨	0	0	2	0	0	1	0	1	0	4
(Sweden) Niklas Edin	0	1	0	0	2	0	1	0	1	5

Player percentages
(Scotland) Bruce Mouat		(Sweden) Niklas Edin	
Hammy McMillan Jr.	99%	Christoffer Sundgren	96%
Bobby Lammie	86%	Rasmus Wranå	79%
Grant Hardie	74%	Oskar Eriksson	91%
Bruce Mouat	80%	Niklas Edin	99%
Total	85%	Total	91%

Sheet B	1	2	3	4	5	6	7	8	Final
(Alberta) Brendan Bottcher 🔨	4	0	0	0	1	0	0	0	5
(Ontario) Brad Jacobs	0	0	0	1	0	1	0	0	2

Player percentages
(Alberta) Brendan Bottcher		(Ontario) Brad Jacobs	
Karrick Martin	91%	Ryan Harnden	100%
Brad Thiessen	93%	E.J. Harnden	100%
Darren Moulding	79%	Ryan Fry	70%
Brendan Bottcher	89%	Brad Jacobs	83%
Total	88%	Total	90%

Sheet C	1	2	3	4	5	6	7	8	Final
(Ontario) Glenn Howard	0	0	0	1	0	1	0	X	2
(Newfoundland and Labrador) Brad Gushue 🔨	1	0	0	0	3	0	2	X	6

Player percentages
(Ontario) Glenn Howard		(Newfoundland and Labrador) Brad Gushue	
Tim March	82%	Geoff Walker	91%
David Mathers	83%	Brett Gallant	79%
Scott Howard	87%	Mark Nichols	84%
Glenn Howard	81%	Brad Gushue	87%
Total	83%	Total	85%

Sheet D	1	2	3	4	5	6	7	8	Final
(Alberta) Kevin Koe 🔨	0	0	1	0	0	3	0	0	4
(Ontario) John Epping	0	3	0	1	1	0	0	1	6

Player percentages
(Alberta) Kevin Koe		(Ontario) John Epping	
Ben Hebert	89%	Craig Savill	69%
Colton Flasch	84%	Brent Laing	77%
B. J. Neufeld	89%	Matt Camm	75%
Kevin Koe	61%	John Epping	87%
Total	81%	Total	77%

==== Semifinals ====
Saturday, January 12, 7:00 pm

Sheet C	1	2	3	4	5	6	7	8	Final
(Sweden) Niklas Edin	0	1	0	0	0	X	X	X	1
(Ontario) John Epping 🔨	4	0	2	1	2	X	X	X	9

Player percentages
(Sweden) Niklas Edin		(Ontario) John Epping	
Christoffer Sundgren	100%	Craig Savill	82%
Rasmus Wranå	91%	Brent Laing	96%
Oskar Eriksson	91%	Matt Camm	97%
Niklas Edin	53%	John Epping	93%
Total	84%	Total	92%

Sheet D	1	2	3	4	5	6	7	8	Final
(Alberta) Brendan Bottcher 🔨	1	0	2	0	0	1	0	2	6
(Newfoundland and Labrador) Brad Gushue	0	1	0	2	1	0	1	0	5

Player percentages
(Alberta) Brendan Bottcher		(Newfoundland and Labrador) Brad Gushue	
Karrick Martin	94%	Geoff Walker	90%
Brad Thiessen	81%	Brett Gallant	83%
Darren Moulding	82%	Mark Nichols	86%
Brendan Bottcher	86%	Brad Gushue	86%
Total	86%	Total	86%

==== Final ====
Sunday, January 13, 11:30 am

Sheet C	1	2	3	4	5	6	7	8	Final
(Alberta) Brendan Bottcher 🔨	2	0	1	0	0	2	1	X	6
(Ontario) John Epping	0	2	0	0	1	0	0	X	3

Player percentages
(Alberta) Brendan Bottcher		(Ontario) John Epping	
Karrick Martin	81%	Craig Savill	86%
Brad Thiessen	86%	Brent Laing	82%
Darren Moulding	87%	Matt Camm	76%
Brendan Bottcher	82%	John Epping	75%
Total	84%	Total	80%

== Women ==
=== Teams ===
Skip	Third	Second	Lead	Locale
Chelsea Carey	Sarah Wilkes	Dana Ferguson	Rachelle Brown	Calgary, Alberta
Kerri Einarson	Val Sweeting	Shannon Birchard	Briane Meilleur	Gimli, Manitoba
Tracy Fleury	Selena Njegovan	Liz Fyfe	Kristin MacCuish	East St. Paul, Manitoba
Satsuki Fujisawa	Chinami Yoshida	Yumi Suzuki	Yurika Yoshida	Kitami, Japan
Anna Hasselborg	Sara McManus	Agnes Knochenhauer	Sofia Mabergs	Sundbyberg, Sweden
Rachel Homan	Emma Miskew	Joanne Courtney	Lisa Weagle	Ottawa, Ontario
Jennifer Jones	Kaitlyn Lawes	Jocelyn Peterman	Dawn McEwen	Winnipeg, Manitoba
Eve Muirhead	Jennifer Dodds	Vicki Chalmers	Lauren Gray	Stirling, Scotland
Darcy Robertson	Karen Klein	Vanessa Foster	Theresa Cannon	Winnipeg, Manitoba
Nina Roth	Tabitha Peterson	Becca Hamilton	Tara Peterson	Chaska, United States
Casey Scheidegger	Cary-Anne McTaggart	Jessie Haughian	Kristie Moore	Lethbridge, Alberta
Robyn Silvernagle	Stefanie Lawton	Jessie Hunkin	Kara Thevenot	North Battleford, Saskatchewan
Briar Hürlimann (Fourth)	Elena Stern (Skip)	Lisa Gisler	Céline Koller	Brig, Switzerland
Alina Pätz (Fourth)	Silvana Tirinzoni (Skip)	Esther Neuenschwander	Melanie Barbezat	Aarau, Switzerland
Laura Walker	Cathy Overton-Clapham	Lori Olson-Johns	Laine Peters	Edmonton, Alberta
Isabella Wranå	Jennie Wåhlin	Almida de Val	Fanny Sjöberg	Stockholm, Sweden

=== Knockout brackets ===
==== A Event ====
A Event			Semifinals			Qualifier 1
1	(Sweden) Anna Hasselborg	2
1	(Scotland) Eve Muirhead	7	9	(Scotland) Eve Muirhead	6
2	(Alberta) Chelsea Carey	3	9	(Alberta) Casey Scheidegger	2
2	(Alberta) Casey Scheidegger	8				13	(Scotland) Eve Muirhead	8
3	(Switzerland) Silvana Tirinzoni	3				13	(Japan) Satsuki Fujisawa	5
3	(Japan) Satsuki Fujisawa	8	10	(Japan) Satsuki Fujisawa	9
4	(Manitoba) Jennifer Jones	8	10	(Manitoba) Jennifer Jones	3
4	(Sweden) Isabella Wranå	2

A Event			Semifinals			Qualifier 2
5	(Manitoba) Kerri Einarson	4
5	(United States) Nina Roth	5	11	(United States) Nina Roth	5
6	(Manitoba) Tracy Fleury	3	11	(Saskatchewan) Robyn Silvernagle	9
6	(Saskatchewan) Robyn Silvernagle	6				14	(Saskatchewan) Robyn Silvernagle	3
7	(Ontario) Rachel Homan	8				14	(Ontario) Rachel Homan	8
7	(Alberta) Laura Walker	5	12	(Ontario) Rachel Homan	6
8	(Manitoba) Darcy Robertson	8	12	(Manitoba) Darcy Robertson	3
8	(Switzerland) Elena Stern	5

==== B Event ====
B Event			Semifinals			Qualifier 3
15	(Sweden) Anna Hasselborg	7
15	(Alberta) Chelsea Carey	3	19	(Sweden) Anna Hasselborg	4
16	(Switzerland) Silvana Tirinzoni	6	19	(Switzerland) Silvana Tirinzoni	5
16	(Sweden) Isabella Wranå	4				23	(Switzerland) Silvana Tirinzoni	4
						23	(Saskatchewan) Robyn Silvernagle	8

B Event			Semifinals			Qualifier 4
17	(Manitoba) Kerri Einarson	7
17	(Manitoba) Tracy Fleury	8	20	(Manitoba) Tracy Fleury	3
18	(Alberta) Laura Walker	7	20	(Alberta) Laura Walker	4
18	(Switzerland) Elena Stern	5				24	(Alberta) Laura Walker	8
						24	(Japan) Satsuki Fujisawa	6

B Event			Qualifier 5
21	(Alberta) Casey Scheidegger	8
21	(Manitoba) Jennifer Jones	4	25	(Alberta) Casey Scheidegger	4
22	(United States) Nina Roth	7	25	(United States) Nina Roth	5
22	(Manitoba) Darcy Robertson	5

==== C Event ====
C Event			Semifinals			Qualifier 6
26	(Alberta) Chelsea Carey	9
26	(Sweden) Isabella Wranå	5	28	(Alberta) Chelsea Carey	7
			28	(Manitoba) Darcy Robertson	5
						31	(Alberta) Chelsea Carey	6
						31	(Japan) Satsuki Fujisawa	2

C Event			Semifinals			Qualifier 7
27	(Manitoba) Kerri Einarson	7
27	(Switzerland) Elena Stern	2	29	(Manitoba) Kerri Einarson	4
			29	(Manitoba) Jennifer Jones	7
						32	(Manitoba) Jennifer Jones	0
						32	(Switzerland) Silvana Tirinzoni	6

C Event			Qualifier 8
30	(Sweden) Anna Hasselborg	5
30	(Manitoba) Tracy Fleury	7	33	(Manitoba) Tracy Fleury	4
			33	(Alberta) Casey Scheidegger	6

=== Knockout results ===
==== Draw 2 ====
Wednesday, January 9, 8:00 am

Sheet A	1	2	3	4	5	6	7	8	Final
(Manitoba) Darcy Robertson	0	1	0	0	2	1	2	2	8
(Switzerland) Elena Stern 🔨	2	0	1	2	0	0	0	0	5

Sheet B	1	2	3	4	5	6	7	8	Final
(Alberta) Chelsea Carey	0	0	1	0	2	0	X	X	3
(Alberta) Casey Scheidegger 🔨	0	3	0	2	0	3	X	X	8

Sheet D	1	2	3	4	5	6	7	8	Final
(Switzerland) Silvana Tirinzoni	0	1	0	0	2	0	0	X	3
(Japan) Satsuki Fujisawa 🔨	1	0	1	2	0	1	3	X	8

Sheet E	1	2	3	4	5	6	7	8	Final
(Manitoba) Kerri Einarson 🔨	2	0	0	0	2	0	0	0	4
(United States) Nina Roth	0	1	0	1	0	1	1	1	5

==== Draw 3 ====
Wednesday, January 9, 11:30 am

Sheet B	1	2	3	4	5	6	7	8	Final
(Sweden) Anna Hasselborg 🔨	1	0	0	0	1	0	0	X	2
(Scotland) Eve Muirhead	0	2	1	2	0	0	2	X	7

Sheet D	1	2	3	4	5	6	7	8	Final
(Manitoba) Jennifer Jones 🔨	0	1	0	1	2	0	4	X	8
(Sweden) Isabella Wranå	0	0	1	0	0	1	0	X	2

Sheet E	1	2	3	4	5	6	7	8	Final
(Manitoba) Tracy Fleury 🔨	0	1	0	1	0	1	0	X	3
(Saskatchewan) Robyn Silvernagle	0	0	2	0	1	0	3	X	6

==== Draw 4 ====
Wednesday, January 9, 3:00 pm

Sheet A	1	2	3	4	5	6	7	8	Final
(Ontario) Rachel Homan	0	3	0	0	1	0	0	4	8
(Alberta) Laura Walker 🔨	1	0	1	1	0	1	1	0	5

==== Draw 5 ====
Wednesday, January 9, 7:00 pm

Sheet A	1	2	3	4	5	6	7	8	Final
(Japan) Satsuki Fujisawa	0	2	2	1	3	0	1	X	9
(Manitoba) Jennifer Jones 🔨	1	0	0	0	0	2	0	X	3

Sheet D	1	2	3	4	5	6	7	8	Final
(Scotland) Eve Muirhead 🔨	0	0	2	0	0	3	1	X	6
(Alberta) Casey Scheidegger	1	1	0	0	0	0	0	X	2

==== Draw 6 ====
Thursday, January 10, 8:00 am

Sheet A	1	2	3	4	5	6	7	8	Final
(Sweden) Anna Hasselborg 🔨	0	1	1	2	1	0	2	X	7
(Alberta) Chelsea Carey	1	0	0	0	0	2	0	X	3

Sheet B	1	2	3	4	5	6	7	8	9	Final
(United States) Nina Roth	0	0	0	1	0	2	0	2	0	5
(Saskatchewan) Robyn Silvernagle 🔨	0	2	1	0	1	0	1	0	4	9

Sheet C	1	2	3	4	5	6	7	8	Final
(Switzerland) Silvana Tirinzoni	0	3	0	0	2	0	1	X	6
(Sweden) Isabella Wranå 🔨	2	0	0	1	0	1	0	X	4

Sheet D	1	2	3	4	5	6	7	8	Final
(Alberta) Laura Walker	2	0	2	0	0	0	2	1	7
(Switzerland) Elena Stern 🔨	0	2	0	1	2	0	0	0	5

Sheet E	1	2	3	4	5	6	7	8	Final
(Ontario) Rachel Homan	2	0	0	3	0	1	0	X	6
(Manitoba) Darcy Robertson 🔨	0	0	1	0	1	0	1	X	3

==== Draw 7 ====
Thursday, January 10, 11:30 am

Sheet E	1	2	3	4	5	6	7	8	9	Final
(Manitoba) Kerri Einarson 🔨	2	0	1	0	1	0	2	1	0	7
(Manitoba) Tracy Fleury	0	2	0	2	0	3	0	0	1	8

==== Draw 8 ====
Thursday, January 10, 3:00 pm

Sheet A	1	2	3	4	5	6	7	8	9	Final
(United States) Nina Roth 🔨	1	0	3	2	0	0	1	0	2	9
(Manitoba) Darcy Robertson	0	2	0	0	2	1	0	2	0	7

Sheet B	1	2	3	4	5	6	7	8	Final
(Scotland) Eve Muirhead 🔨	2	0	2	0	2	0	2	X	8
(Japan) Satsuki Fujisawa	0	2	0	2	0	1	0	X	5

Sheet C	1	2	3	4	5	6	7	8	Final
(Saskatchewan) Robyn Silvernagle 🔨	1	0	0	2	0	0	X	X	3
(Ontario) Rachel Homan	0	0	3	0	3	2	X	X	8

Sheet D	1	2	3	4	5	6	7	8	Final
(Sweden) Anna Hasselborg 🔨	2	0	0	1	0	0	1	0	4
(Switzerland) Silvana Tirinzoni	0	1	1	0	0	2	0	1	5

Sheet E	1	2	3	4	5	6	7	8	Final
(Alberta) Casey Scheidegger	0	4	1	0	2	0	1	X	8
(Manitoba) Jennifer Jones 🔨	1	0	0	2	0	1	0	X	4

==== Draw 9 ====
Thursday, January 10, 7:00 pm

Sheet A	1	2	3	4	5	6	7	8	Final
(Manitoba) Tracy Fleury 🔨	1	0	1	0	0	0	1	0	3
(Alberta) Laura Walker	0	1	0	1	0	1	0	1	4

==== Draw 10 ====
Friday, January 11, 8:00 am

Sheet B	1	2	3	4	5	6	7	8	Final
(Alberta) Chelsea Carey 🔨	2	0	4	0	1	0	2	X	9
(Sweden) Isabella Wranå	0	2	0	2	0	1	0	X	5

Sheet C	1	2	3	4	5	6	7	8	Final
(Manitoba) Kerri Einarson 🔨	0	2	1	1	2	0	1	X	7
(Switzerland) Elena Stern	1	0	0	0	0	1	0	X	2

==== Draw 11 ====
Friday, January 11, 11:30 am

Sheet B	1	2	3	4	5	6	7	8	Final
(Switzerland) Silvana Tirinzoni	0	1	0	1	0	2	X	X	4
(Saskatchewan) Robyn Silvernagle 🔨	1	0	3	0	4	0	X	X	8

Sheet C	1	2	3	4	5	6	7	8	Final
(Alberta) Laura Walker 🔨	1	0	1	0	3	2	0	1	8
(Japan) Satsuki Fujisawa	0	2	0	2	0	0	2	0	6

Sheet D	1	2	3	4	5	6	7	8	Final
(Alberta) Casey Scheidegger 🔨	1	1	0	1	0	0	1	0	4
(United States) Nina Roth	0	0	1	0	1	1	0	2	5

==== Draw 12 ====
Friday, January 11, 3:00 pm

Sheet A	1	2	3	4	5	6	7	8	Final
(Alberta) Chelsea Carey	1	0	2	0	0	1	2	1	7
(Manitoba) Darcy Robertson 🔨	0	1	0	2	2	0	0	0	5

Sheet D	1	2	3	4	5	6	7	8	Final
(Manitoba) Kerri Einarson	1	0	2	0	1	0	0	X	4
(Manitoba) Jennifer Jones 🔨	0	1	0	3	0	3	0	X	7

Sheet E	1	2	3	4	5	6	7	8	9	Final
(Sweden) Anna Hasselborg	0	0	2	1	0	1	0	1	0	5
(Manitoba) Tracy Fleury 🔨	1	0	0	0	3	0	1	0	2	7

==== Draw 13 ====
Friday, January 11, 6:30 pm

Sheet A	1	2	3	4	5	6	7	8	Final
(Alberta) Chelsea Carey 🔨	1	0	2	1	0	1	1	X	6
(Japan) Satsuki Fujisawa	0	1	0	0	1	0	0	X	2

Sheet C	1	2	3	4	5	6	7	8	Final
(Manitoba) Tracy Fleury	0	2	0	0	1	1	0	X	4
(Alberta) Casey Scheidegger 🔨	3	0	0	2	0	0	1	X	6

Sheet E	1	2	3	4	5	6	7	8	Final
(Manitoba) Jennifer Jones	0	0	0	0	0	0	X	X	0
(Switzerland) Silvana Tirinzoni 🔨	2	0	1	1	1	1	X	X	6

=== Playoffs ===
Quarterfinals
A2	(Ontario) Rachel Homan	4
C3	(Alberta) Casey Scheidegger	3
B2	(Alberta) Laura Walker	3
B3	(United States) Nina Roth	6
A1	(Scotland) Eve Muirhead	10
C1	(Alberta) Chelsea Carey	3
B1	(Saskatchewan) Robyn Silvernagle	1
C2	(Switzerland) Silvana Tirinzoni	6

Semifinals
A2	(Ontario) Rachel Homan	6
B3	(United States) Nina Roth	4
A1	(Scotland) Eve Muirhead	4
C2	(Switzerland) Silvana Tirinzoni	8

Final
A2	(Ontario) Rachel Homan	4
C2	(Switzerland) Silvana Tirinzoni	3

==== Quarterfinals ====
Saturday, January 12, 11:30 am

Sheet A	1	2	3	4	5	6	7	8	Final
(Saskatchewan) Robyn Silvernagle 🔨	0	1	0	0	0	0	0	X	1
(Switzerland) Silvana Tirinzoni	0	0	2	0	2	0	2	X	6

Player percentages
(Saskatchewan) Robyn Silvernagle		(Switzerland) Silvana Tirinzoni	
Kara Thevenot	80%	Melanie Barbezat	75%
Jessie Hunkin	61%	Esther Neuenschwander	70%
Stefanie Lawton	59%	Silvana Tirinzoni	82%
Robyn Silvernagle	59%	Alina Pätz	86%
Total	65%	Total	78%

Sheet B	1	2	3	4	5	6	7	8	Final
(Ontario) Rachel Homan 🔨	0	2	0	1	0	0	0	1	4
(Alberta) Casey Scheidegger	0	0	2	0	0	0	1	0	3

Player percentages
(Ontario) Rachel Homan		(Alberta) Casey Scheidegger	
Lisa Weagle	79%	Kristie Moore	76%
Joanne Courtney	66%	Jessie Haughian	83%
Emma Miskew	71%	Cary-Anne McTaggart	85%
Rachel Homan	88%	Casey Scheidegger	83%
Total	76%	Total	82%

Sheet C	1	2	3	4	5	6	7	8	Final
(Alberta) Laura Walker	0	0	0	2	0	1	0	X	3
(United States) Nina Roth 🔨	0	2	0	0	2	0	2	X	6

Player percentages
(Alberta) Laura Walker		(United States) Nina Roth	
Laine Peters	92%	Tara Peterson	81%
Lori Olson-Johns	75%	Becca Hamilton	90%
Cathy Overton-Clapham	85%	Tabitha Peterson	77%
Laura Walker	81%	Nina Roth	91%
Total	83%	Total	85%

Sheet D	1	2	3	4	5	6	7	8	Final
(Scotland) Eve Muirhead 🔨	7	0	2	1	0	X	X	X	10
(Alberta) Chelsea Carey	0	2	0	0	1	X	X	X	3

Player percentages
(Scotland) Eve Muirhead		(Alberta) Chelsea Carey	
Lauren Gray	76%	Rachelle Brown	97%
Vicki Chalmers	98%	Dana Ferguson	70%
Jennifer Dodds	93%	Sarah Wilkes	71%
Eve Muirhead	81%	Chelsea Carey	79%
Total	87%	Total	79%

==== Semifinals ====
Saturday, January 12, 7:00 pm

Sheet A	1	2	3	4	5	6	7	8	Final
(Scotland) Eve Muirhead 🔨	0	0	0	2	0	2	0	X	4
(Switzerland) Silvana Tirinzoni	1	1	1	0	3	0	2	X	8

Player percentages
(Scotland) Eve Muirhead		(Switzerland) Silvana Tirinzoni	
Lauren Gray	77%	Melanie Barbezat	94%
Vicki Chalmers	89%	Esther Neuenschwander	88%
Jennifer Dodds	85%	Silvana Tirinzoni	83%
Eve Muirhead	53%	Alina Pätz	86%
Total	76%	Total	88%

Sheet B	1	2	3	4	5	6	7	8	Final
(Ontario) Rachel Homan	2	0	3	0	1	0	0	X	6
(United States) Nina Roth	0	2	0	1	0	1	0	X	4

Player percentages
(Ontario) Rachel Homan		(United States) Nina Roth	
Lisa Weagle	72%	Tara Peterson	98%
Joanne Courtney	87%	Becca Hamilton	70%
Emma Miskew	77%	Tabitha Peterson	61%
Rachel Homan	87%	Nina Roth	69%
Total	81%	Total	74%

==== Final ====
Sunday, January 13, 3:00pm

Sheet C	1	2	3	4	5	6	7	8	Final
(Ontario) Rachel Homan 🔨	0	1	0	0	1	1	0	1	4
(Switzerland) Silvana Tirinzoni	1	0	0	0	0	0	2	0	3

Player percentages
(Ontario) Rachel Homan		(Switzerland) Silvana Tirinzoni	
Lisa Weagle	77%	Melanie Barbezat	75%
Joanne Courtney	78%	Esther Neuenschwander	82%
Emma Miskew	74%	Silvana Tirinzoni	82%
Rachel Homan	82%	Alina Pätz	81%
Total	78%	Total	80%
