= 2018 National =

Grand Slam of Curling event

2018 BOOST National
- Host city: Conception Bay South, Newfoundland and Labrador
- Arena: Conception Bay South Arena
- Dates: December 11–16
- Men's winner: (Scotland) Ross Paterson
- Curling club: Cadder CC, Glasgow, Scotland
- Skip: Ross Paterson
- Third: Kyle Waddell
- Second: Duncan Menzies
- Lead: Michael Goodfellow
- Coach: Ian Tetley
- Finalist: (Scotland) Bruce Mouat
- Women's winner: (Ontario) Rachel Homan
- Curling club: Ottawa CC, Ottawa, Ontario
- Skip: Rachel Homan
- Third: Emma Miskew
- Second: Joanne Courtney
- Lead: Lisa Weagle
- Finalist: (Manitoba) Kerri Einarson

The 2018 BOOST National was held from December 11 to 16 at the Conception Bay South Arena in Conception Bay South, Newfoundland and Labrador. This will be the fourth Grand Slam and second major of the 2018–19 curling season.

The first all-Scottish Grand Slam final saw Ross Paterson of Glasgow beat defending champions Bruce Mouat of Edinburgh 4–3 in an extra end to win his team's first Grand Slam. Rachel Homan beat Kerri Einarson 4–1 in the women's final, to win her ninth slam.

The event was sold out all week, owing to the popularity of the hometown Brad Gushue rink. The total attendance was 23,500 which was a Grand Slam record at the time.

== Qualification ==
The top 14 men's and women's teams on the World Curling Tour order of merit standing as of November 5, 2018 qualified for the event. The Grand Slam of Curling may fill one spot in each division as a sponsor's exemption. In the event that a team declines its invitation, the next-ranked team on the order of merit is invited until the field is complete. The sponsor's exemption was not used, and the spot was allocated to the highest-ranked remaining team on the order of merit.

=== Men ===
Top Order of Merit men's teams as of November 5:

1. (Sweden) Niklas Edin
2. (Newfoundland and Labrador) Brad Gushue
3. (Alberta) Kevin Koe
4. (Ontario) John Epping
5. (Scotland) Bruce Mouat
6. (Manitoba) Reid Carruthers
7. (Ontario) Brad Jacobs
8. (Switzerland) Peter de Cruz
9. (Manitoba) Jason Gunnlaugson
10. (Alberta) ~~Brendan Bottcher~~
11. (Norway) ~~Steffen Walstad~~
12. (Saskatchewan) ~~Matt Dunstone~~
13. (Ontario) Glenn Howard
14. (United States) ~~John Shuster~~
15. (Switzerland) Yannick Schwaller
16. (Ontario) Scott McDonald
17. (Manitoba) Braden Calvert
18. (Norway) ~~Thomas Ulsrud~~
19. (Scotland) Ross Paterson
20. (United States) ~~Rich Ruohonen~~
21. (Saskatchewan) Kirk Muyres

=== Women ===
Top Order of Merit women's teams as of November 5:

1. (Sweden) Anna Hasselborg
2. (Manitoba) Jennifer Jones
3. (Ontario) Rachel Homan
4. (Manitoba) Kerri Einarson
5. (Manitoba) Tracy Fleury
6. (Switzerland) Silvana Tirinzoni
7. (Alberta) Chelsea Carey
8. (Japan) Satsuki Fujisawa
9. (Alberta) Casey Scheidegger
10. (Alberta) ~~Laura Walker~~
11. (Scotland) Eve Muirhead
12. (Manitoba) ~~Darcy Robertson~~
13. (United States) Jamie Sinclair
14. (United States) Nina Roth
15. (Sweden) Isabella Wranå
16. (Manitoba) ~~Allison Flaxey~~
17. (Russia) ~~Anna Sidorova~~
18. (South Korea) ~~Kim Eun-jung~~
19. (Japan) Sayaka Yoshimura
20. (Ontario) Jacqueline Harrison

== Men ==
=== Teams ===
Skip	Third	Second	Lead	Locale
Braden Calvert	Kyle Kurz	Ian McMillan	Rob Gordon	Winnipeg, Manitoba
Benoît Schwarz (Fourth)	Sven Michel	Peter de Cruz (Skip)	Valentin Tanner	Geneva, Switzerland
Niklas Edin	Oskar Eriksson	Rasmus Wranå	Christoffer Sundgren	Karlstad, Sweden
John Epping	Mathew Camm	Brent Laing	Craig Savill	Toronto, Ontario
Jason Gunnlaugson	Alex Forrest	Denni Neufeld	Connor Njegovan	Morris, Manitoba
Brad Gushue	Mark Nichols	Brett Gallant	Geoff Walker	St. John's, Newfoundland and Labrador
Glenn Howard	Scott Howard	David Mathers	Tim March	Penetanguishene, Ontario
Brad Jacobs	E. J. Harnden	Matt Wozniak	Ryan Harnden	Sault Ste. Marie, Ontario
Kevin Koe	B. J. Neufeld	Colton Flasch	Ben Hebert	Calgary, Alberta
Scott McDonald	Jonathan Beuk	Wesley Forget	Scott Chadwick	Kingston, Ontario
Mike McEwen	Reid Carruthers	Derek Samagalski	Colin Hodgson	Winnipeg, Manitoba
Bruce Mouat	Grant Hardie	Bobby Lammie	Hammy McMillan Jr.	Edinburgh, Scotland
Kirk Muyres	Kevin Marsh	Dan Marsh	Dallan Muyres	Saskatoon, Saskatchewan
Ross Paterson	Kyle Waddell	Duncan Menzies	Michael Goodfellow	Glasgow, Scotland
Yannick Schwaller	Michael Brunner	Romano Meier	Marcel Käufeler	Bern, Switzerland

=== Round robin standings ===
Final round robin standings

Key
Teams to playoffs
Teams to tiebreakers

Pool A	W	L	PF	PA
(Ontario) Brad Jacobs	4	0	29	14
(Sweden) Niklas Edin	3	1	23	20
(Ontario) Scott McDonald	1	3	19	25
(Manitoba) Team Carruthers	1	3	15	23
(Manitoba) Braden Calvert	1	3	18	22

Pool B	W	L	PF	PA
(Scotland) Bruce Mouat	4	0	27	14
(Scotland) Ross Paterson	2	2	16	23
(Switzerland) Yannick Schwaller	2	2	24	27
(Newfoundland and Labrador) Brad Gushue	2	2	24	18
(Switzerland) Peter de Cruz	0	4	14	23

Pool C	W	L	PF	PA
(Alberta) Kevin Koe	3	1	23	16
(Manitoba) Jason Gunnlaugson	2	2	15	16
(Ontario) Glenn Howard	2	2	19	18
(Saskatchewan) Kirk Muyres	2	2	15	20
(Ontario) John Epping	1	3	22	24

=== Round robin results ===
All draw times are listed in Newfoundland Standard Time (UTC−3:30).

==== Draw 1 ====
Tuesday, December 11, 7:00 p.m.

Sheet A	1	2	3	4	5	6	7	8	Final
(Ontario) Brad Jacobs	1	0	2	1	1	0	2	X	7
(Ontario) Scott McDonald 🔨	0	4	0	0	0	1	0	X	5

Sheet B	1	2	3	4	5	6	7	8	9	Final
(Newfoundland and Labrador) Brad Gushue 🔨	2	0	0	2	0	0	0	2	0	6
(Switzerland) Yannick Schwaller	0	0	2	0	1	2	1	0	2	8

Sheet E	1	2	3	4	5	6	7	8	Final
(Ontario) Glenn Howard	0	0	0	0	2	0	1	1	4
(Manitoba) Jason Gunnlaugson 🔨	0	0	0	1	0	0	0	0	1

==== Draw 2 ====
Wednesday, December 12, 9:00 a.m.

Sheet B	1	2	3	4	5	6	7	8	Final
(Scotland) Bruce Mouat 🔨	1	0	1	1	1	0	1	1	6
(Switzerland) Peter de Cruz	0	2	0	0	0	1	0	0	3

Sheet D	1	2	3	4	5	6	7	8	Final
(Sweden) Niklas Edin	0	3	1	0	0	2	0	1	7
(Manitoba) Braden Calvert 🔨	2	0	0	0	2	0	1	0	5

==== Draw 3 ====
Wednesday, December 12, 12:30 p.m.

Sheet B	1	2	3	4	5	6	7	8	Final
(Ontario) John Epping	0	0	0	1	2	1	1	1	6
(Saskatchewan) Kirk Muyres 🔨	0	0	2	0	0	0	0	0	2

Sheet C	1	2	3	4	5	6	7	8	Final
(Scotland) Ross Paterson	1	0	1	0	1	0	3	2	8
(Switzerland) Yannick Schwaller 🔨	0	2	0	2	0	1	0	0	5

Sheet D	1	2	3	4	5	6	7	8	Final
(Manitoba) Team Carruthers	0	2	0	1	0	4	1	X	8
(Ontario) Scott McDonald 🔨	2	0	0	0	2	0	0	X	4

==== Draw 4 ====
Wednesday, December 12, 4:30 p.m.

Sheet A	1	2	3	4	5	6	7	8	Final
(Alberta) Kevin Koe	0	0	1	0	0	2	0	0	3
(Manitoba) Jason Gunnlaugson 🔨	2	0	0	0	1	0	0	1	4

==== Draw 5 ====
Wednesday, December 12, 8:30 p.m.

Sheet A	1	2	3	4	5	6	7	8	Final
(Newfoundland and Labrador) Brad Gushue 🔨	2	0	1	3	0	2	X	X	8
(Scotland) Ross Paterson	0	0	0	0	1	0	X	X	1

Sheet C	1	2	3	4	5	6	7	8	Final
(Ontario) Brad Jacobs 🔨	1	0	1	0	2	0	0	3	7
(Manitoba) Braden Calvert	0	1	0	0	0	1	1	0	3

Sheet D	1	2	3	4	5	6	7	8	Final
(Ontario) Glenn Howard	1	0	1	0	2	0	0	0	4
(Saskatchewan) Kirk Muyres 🔨	0	1	0	2	0	1	1	1	6

Sheet E	1	2	3	4	5	6	7	8	Final
(Sweden) Niklas Edin	0	2	0	0	2	0	0	1	5
(Manitoba) Team Carruthers 🔨	0	0	0	2	0	2	0	0	4

==== Draw 7 ====
Thursday, December 13, 12:30 p.m.

Sheet A	1	2	3	4	5	6	7	8	9	Final
(Switzerland) Peter de Cruz 🔨	0	1	0	0	1	1	1	1	0	5
(Switzerland) Yannick Schwaller	1	0	2	2	0	0	0	0	1	6

Sheet B	1	2	3	4	5	6	7	8	Final
(Manitoba) Team Carruthers 🔨	1	0	0	0	0	1	0	X	2
(Manitoba) Braden Calvert	0	1	1	1	1	0	2	X	6

Sheet C	1	2	3	4	5	6	7	8	9	Final
(Alberta) Kevin Koe	1	0	2	0	0	1	0	0	1	5
(Ontario) Glenn Howard 🔨	0	0	0	0	1	0	2	1	0	4

Sheet D	1	2	3	4	5	6	7	8	Final
(Ontario) John Epping	0	1	0	0	2	0	2	X	5
(Manitoba) Jason Gunnlaugson	2	0	3	1	0	1	0	X	7

Sheet E	1	2	3	4	5	6	7	8	Final
(Scotland) Bruce Mouat 🔨	0	3	0	2	2	X	X	X	7
(Scotland) Ross Paterson	0	0	1	0	0	X	X	X	1

==== Draw 8 ====
Thursday, December 13, 4:30 p.m.

Sheet B	1	2	3	4	5	6	7	8	Final
(Sweden) Niklas Edin 🔨	0	4	0	0	1	1	0	X	6
(Ontario) Scott McDonald	0	0	1	0	0	0	3	X	4

==== Draw 9 ====
Thursday, December 13, 8:30 p.m.

Sheet A	1	2	3	4	5	6	7	8	Final
(Ontario) John Epping 🔨	2	0	0	1	0	3	0	0	6
(Ontario) Glenn Howard	0	0	3	0	2	0	0	2	7

Sheet B	1	2	3	4	5	6	7	8	Final
(Scotland) Bruce Mouat 🔨	2	0	0	2	0	2	1	1	8
(Switzerland) Yannick Schwaller	0	1	2	0	2	0	0	0	5

Sheet C	1	2	3	4	5	6	7	8	Final
(Newfoundland and Labrador) Brad Gushue	0	1	0	0	1	0	2	1	5
(Switzerland) Peter de Cruz 🔨	1	0	0	1	0	1	0	0	3

Sheet D	1	2	3	4	5	6	7	8	Final
(Ontario) Brad Jacobs 🔨	1	1	3	0	0	3	X	X	8
(Manitoba) Team Carruthers	0	0	0	0	1	0	X	X	1

Sheet E	1	2	3	4	5	6	7	8	Final
(Alberta) Kevin Koe 🔨	2	0	0	0	2	0	3	X	7
(Saskatchewan) Kirk Muyres	0	0	1	1	0	1	0	X	3

==== Draw 11 ====
Friday, December 14, 12:30 p.m.

Sheet C	1	2	3	4	5	6	7	8	9	Final
(Sweden) Niklas Edin 🔨	2	0	0	2	0	1	0	0	0	5
(Ontario) Brad Jacobs	0	3	1	0	0	0	0	1	2	7

Sheet D	1	2	3	4	5	6	7	8	Final
(Alberta) Kevin Koe 🔨	0	2	1	0	2	2	0	1	8
(Ontario) John Epping	0	0	0	3	0	0	2	0	5

==== Draw 12 ====
Friday, December 14, 4:30 p.m.

Sheet B	1	2	3	4	5	6	7	8	Final
(Switzerland) Peter de Cruz	0	1	0	1	0	0	1	0	3
(Scotland) Ross Paterson 🔨	3	0	1	0	1	0	0	1	6

Sheet C	1	2	3	4	5	6	7	8	9	Final
(Manitoba) Jason Gunnlaugson 🔨	1	0	0	1	0	0	0	1	0	3
(Saskatchewan) Kirk Muyres	0	1	0	0	0	1	1	0	1	4

Sheet D	1	2	3	4	5	6	7	8	Final
(Newfoundland and Labrador) Brad Gushue 🔨	0	1	0	0	0	0	2	2	5
(Scotland) Bruce Mouat	1	0	1	1	3	0	0	0	6

Sheet E	1	2	3	4	5	6	7	8	Final
(Ontario) Scott McDonald 🔨	0	2	0	0	0	2	0	2	6
(Manitoba) Braden Calvert	1	0	2	0	0	0	1	0	4

=== Tiebreakers ===
Friday, December 14, 8:30 p.m.

Sheet A	1	2	3	4	5	6	7	8	Final
(Switzerland) Yannick Schwaller	0	0	0	0	0	1	0	X	1
(Newfoundland and Labrador) Brad Gushue 🔨	2	0	0	0	0	0	2	X	4

Sheet E	1	2	3	4	5	6	7	8	Final
(Ontario) Glenn Howard 🔨	0	0	0	0	2	0	1	1	4
(Saskatchewan) Kirk Muyres	0	1	0	0	0	1	0	0	2

=== Playoffs ===
Quarterfinals
1	(Scotland) Bruce Mouat	7
8	(Newfoundland and Labrador) Brad Gushue	5
4	(Alberta) Kevin Koe	9
5	(Manitoba) Jason Gunnlaugson	5
2	(Ontario) Brad Jacobs	4
7	(Ontario) Glenn Howard	5
3	(Sweden) Niklas Edin	4
6	(Scotland) Ross Paterson	7

Semifinals
1	(Scotland) Bruce Mouat	6
4	(Alberta) Kevin Koe	5
7	(Ontario) Glenn Howard	6
6	(Scotland) Ross Paterson	7

Final
1	(Scotland) Bruce Mouat	3
6	(Scotland) Ross Paterson	4

==== Quarterfinals ====
Saturday, December 15, 11:00 a.m.

Sheet A	1	2	3	4	5	6	7	8	Final
(Alberta) Kevin Koe 🔨	1	4	0	0	2	0	0	2	9
(Manitoba) Jason Gunnlaugson	0	0	1	1	0	2	1	0	5

Player percentages
(Alberta) Kevin Koe		(Manitoba) Jason Gunnlaugson	
Ben Hebert	78%	Connor Njegovan	92%
Colton Flasch	82%	Denni Neufeld	75%
B. J. Neufeld	96%	Alex Forrest	77%
Kevin Koe	91%	Jason Gunnlaugson	81%
Total	87%	Total	81%

Sheet B	1	2	3	4	5	6	7	8	Final
(Scotland) Bruce Mouat 🔨	2	0	2	0	2	0	0	1	7
(Newfoundland and Labrador) Brad Gushue	0	2	0	1	0	2	0	0	5

Player percentages
(Scotland) Bruce Mouat		(Newfoundland and Labrador) Brad Gushue	
Hammy McMillan Jr.	85%	Geoff Walker	93%
Bobby Lammie	99%	Brett Gallant	88%
Grant Hardie	97%	Mark Nichols	93%
Bruce Mouat	91%	Brad Gushue	96%
Total	93%	Total	92%

Sheet C	1	2	3	4	5	6	7	8	9	Final
(Ontario) Brad Jacobs 🔨	1	0	0	1	0	0	1	1	0	4
(Ontario) Glenn Howard	0	1	0	0	0	3	0	0	1	5

Player percentages
(Ontario) Brad Jacobs		(Ontario) Glenn Howard	
Ryan Harnden	82%	Tim March	79%
Matt Wozniak	71%	David Mathers	100%
E. J. Harnden	75%	Scott Howard	85%
Brad Jacobs	84%	Glenn Howard	82%
Total	78%	Total	86%

Sheet D	1	2	3	4	5	6	7	8	Final
(Sweden) Niklas Edin 🔨	0	2	0	1	0	1	0	X	4
(Scotland) Ross Paterson	0	0	2	0	2	0	3	X	7

Player percentages
(Sweden) Niklas Edin		(Scotland) Ross Paterson	
Christoffer Sundgren	90%	Michael Goodfellow	84%
Rasmus Wranå	84%	Duncan Menzies	91%
Oskar Eriksson	87%	Kyle Waddell	90%
Niklas Edin	84%	Ross Paterson	86%
Total	86%	Total	88%

==== Semifinals ====
Saturday, December 15, 7:30 p.m.

Sheet B	1	2	3	4	5	6	7	8	9	Final
(Ontario) Glenn Howard	0	2	0	1	0	1	0	2	0	6
(Scotland) Ross Paterson 🔨	2	0	2	0	1	0	1	0	1	7

Player percentages
(Ontario) Glenn Howard		(Scotland) Ross Paterson	
Tim March	89%	Michael Goodfellow	81%
David Mathers	62%	Duncan Menzies	99%
Scott Howard	81%	Kyle Waddell	85%
Glenn Howard	85%	Ross Paterson	84%
Total	79%	Total	87%

Sheet C	1	2	3	4	5	6	7	8	Final
(Scotland) Bruce Mouat 🔨	1	0	1	0	2	0	0	2	6
(Alberta) Kevin Koe	0	1	0	3	0	0	1	0	5

Player percentages
(Scotland) Bruce Mouat		(Alberta) Kevin Koe	
Hammy McMillan Jr.	82%	Ben Hebert	93%
Bobby Lammie	86%	Colton Flasch	96%
Grant Hardie	89%	B. J. Neufeld	98%
Bruce Mouat	95%	Kevin Koe	91%
Total	88%	Total	94%

==== Final ====
Sunday, December 16, 1:30 p.m.

Sheet C	1	2	3	4	5	6	7	8	9	Final
(Scotland) Bruce Mouat 🔨	0	1	0	0	1	0	0	1	0	3
(Scotland) Ross Paterson	1	0	0	1	0	1	0	0	1	4

Player percentages
(Scotland) Bruce Mouat		(Scotland) Ross Paterson	
Hammy McMillan Jr.	79%	Michael Goodfellow	84%
Bobby Lammie	80%	Duncan Menzies	65%
Grant Hardie	89%	Kyle Waddell	88%
Bruce Mouat	78%	Ross Paterson	76%
Total	81%	Total	78%

== Women ==
=== Teams ===
Skip	Third	Second	Lead	Locale
Chelsea Carey	Sarah Wilkes	Dana Ferguson	Rachelle Brown	Calgary, Alberta
Kerri Einarson	Val Sweeting	Shannon Birchard	Briane Meilleur	Gimli, Manitoba
Tracy Fleury	Selena Njegovan	Liz Fyfe	Kristin MacCuish	East St. Paul, Manitoba
Satsuki Fujisawa	Chinami Yoshida	Yumi Suzuki	Yurika Yoshida	Kitami, Japan
Jacqueline Harrison	Clancy Grandy	Lynn Kreviazuk	Morgan Court	Toronto, Ontario
Anna Hasselborg	Sara McManus	Agnes Knochenhauer	Sofia Mabergs	Sundbyberg, Sweden
Rachel Homan	Emma Miskew	Joanne Courtney	Lisa Weagle	Ottawa, Ontario
Jennifer Jones	Kaitlyn Lawes	Jocelyn Peterman	Dawn McEwen	Winnipeg, Manitoba
Eve Muirhead	Jennifer Dodds	Vicki Chalmers	Lauren Gray	Stirling, Scotland
Nina Roth	Tabitha Peterson	Becca Hamilton	Tara Peterson	Chaska, United States
Casey Scheidegger	Cary-Anne McTaggart	Jessie Haughian	Kristie Moore	Lethbridge, Alberta
Jamie Sinclair	Sarah Anderson	Taylor Anderson	Monica Walker	Chaska, United States
Alina Pätz (Fourth)	Silvana Tirinzoni (Skip)	Esther Neuenschwander	Melanie Barbezat	Aarau, Switzerland
Isabella Wranå	Jennie Wåhlin	Almida de Val	Fanny Sjöberg	Stockholm, Sweden
Sayaka Yoshimura	Kaho Onodera	Anna Ohmiya	Yumie Funayama	Sapporo, Japan

=== Round robin standings ===
Final round robin standings

Key
Teams to playoffs
Teams to tiebreakers

Pool A	W	L	PF	PA
(Sweden) Anna Hasselborg	4	0	21	15
(Switzerland) Silvana Tirinzoni	3	1	25	16
(Alberta) Chelsea Carey	1	3	17	23
(United States) Nina Roth	1	3	26	25
(Sweden) Isabella Wranå	1	3	13	23

Pool B	W	L	PF	PA
(Japan) Satsuki Fujisawa	3	1	30	17
(Manitoba) Jennifer Jones	3	1	23	17
(United States) Jamie Sinclair	2	2	19	28
(Manitoba) Tracy Fleury	1	3	17	25
(Japan) Sayaka Yoshimura	1	3	20	22

Pool C	W	L	PF	PA
(Ontario) Rachel Homan	3	1	22	19
(Scotland) Eve Muirhead	3	1	21	19
(Ontario) Jacqueline Harrison	2	2	23	21
(Manitoba) Kerri Einarson	2	2	24	19
(Alberta) Casey Scheidegger	0	4	15	27

=== Round robin results ===
All draw times are listed in Newfoundland Standard Time (UTC−3:30).

==== Draw 1 ====
Tuesday, December 11, 7:00 p.m.

Sheet C	1	2	3	4	5	6	7	8	Final
(Japan) Satsuki Fujisawa	1	0	2	0	4	0	2	X	9
(United States) Jamie Sinclair 🔨	0	2	0	1	0	1	0	X	4

Sheet D	1	2	3	4	5	6	7	8	Final
(Alberta) Chelsea Carey 🔨	0	1	0	2	3	0	2	0	8
(United States) Nina Roth	0	0	2	0	0	3	0	2	7

==== Draw 2 ====
Wednesday, December 12, 9:00 a.m.

Sheet A	1	2	3	4	5	6	7	8	Final
(Scotland) Eve Muirhead 🔨	3	0	2	1	0	0	0	0	6
(Ontario) Jacqueline Harrison	0	1	0	0	2	1	1	0	5

Sheet C	1	2	3	4	5	6	7	8	Final
(Ontario) Tracy Fleury	0	1	0	1	0	0	X	X	2
(Japan) Sayaka Yoshimura 🔨	2	0	3	0	1	2	X	X	8

Sheet E	1	2	3	4	5	6	7	8	Final
(Switzerland) Silvana Tirinzoni	0	0	3	0	2	0	1	X	6
(Sweden) Isabella Wranå 🔨	0	1	0	1	0	1	0	X	3

==== Draw 3 ====
Wednesday, December 12, 12:30 p.m.

Sheet A	1	2	3	4	5	6	7	8	Final
(Sweden) Anna Hasselborg 🔨	0	0	2	0	1	0	0	1	4
(Alberta) Chelsea Carey	1	0	0	1	0	1	0	0	3

Sheet E	1	2	3	4	5	6	7	8	Final
(Ontario) Rachel Homan	2	0	0	1	1	0	0	1	5
(Alberta) Casey Scheidegger 🔨	0	2	0	0	0	1	0	0	3

==== Draw 4 ====
Wednesday, December 12, 4:30 p.m.

Sheet B	1	2	3	4	5	6	7	8	Final
(United States) Nina Roth	3	0	3	1	2	X	X	X	9
(Sweden) Isabella Wranå 🔨	0	3	0	0	0	X	X	X	3

Sheet C	1	2	3	4	5	6	7	8	Final
(Manitoba) Kerri Einarson	1	0	1	0	1	1	1	X	5
(Scotland) Eve Muirhead 🔨	0	1	0	1	0	0	0	X	2

Sheet D	1	2	3	4	5	6	7	8	Final
(Manitoba) Jennifer Jones	0	0	0	2	0	0	X	X	2
(Japan) Satsuki Fujisawa 🔨	1	1	2	0	3	1	X	X	8

Sheet E	1	2	3	4	5	6	7	8	Final
(Manitoba) Tracy Fleury 🔨	1	0	0	2	0	1	1	0	5
(United States) Jamie Sinclair	0	3	1	0	2	0	0	1	7

==== Draw 5 ====
Wednesday, December 12, 8:30 p.m.

Sheet B	1	2	3	4	5	6	7	8	Final
(Ontario) Rachel Homan 🔨	0	1	0	2	0	1	2	X	6
(Ontario) Jacqueline Harrison	0	0	2	0	1	0	0	X	3

==== Draw 6 ====
Thursday, December 13, 9:00 a.m.

Sheet A	1	2	3	4	5	6	7	8	Final
(Manitoba) Tracy Fleury 🔨	1	0	0	3	0	1	0	1	6
(Japan) Satsuki Fujisawa	0	2	0	0	2	0	1	0	5

Sheet B	1	2	3	4	5	6	7	8	Final
(Switzerland) Silvana Tirinzoni	0	2	0	2	1	1	1	X	7
(Alberta) Chelsea Carey 🔨	1	0	1	0	0	0	0	X	2

Sheet C	1	2	3	4	5	6	7	8	Final
(Sweden) Anna Hasselborg	0	0	1	1	0	1	0	1	4
(Sweden) Isabella Wranå 🔨	1	0	0	0	0	0	1	0	2

Sheet D	1	2	3	4	5	6	7	8	Final
(Manitoba) Kerri Einarson	0	1	0	3	0	1	1	3	9
(Alberta) Casey Scheidegger 🔨	1	0	2	0	1	0	0	0	4

Sheet E	1	2	3	4	5	6	7	8	Final
(Manitoba) Jennifer Jones 🔨	2	0	2	1	0	0	1	X	6
(Japan) Sayaka Yoshimura	0	1	0	0	1	1	0	X	3

==== Draw 8 ====
Thursday, December 13, 4:30 p.m.

Sheet A	1	2	3	4	5	6	7	8	Final
(Switzerland) Silvana Tirinzoni	0	2	0	2	0	2	0	1	7
(United States) Nina Roth 🔨	2	0	1	0	1	0	1	0	5

Sheet C	1	2	3	4	5	6	7	8	Final
(Ontario) Rachel Homan 🔨	0	0	3	0	2	0	0	0	5
(Scotland) Eve Muirhead	0	2	0	2	0	2	0	2	8

Sheet D	1	2	3	4	5	6	7	8	Final
(United States) Jamie Sinclair	0	0	4	0	1	0	0	1	6
(Japan) Sayaka Yoshimura 🔨	0	2	0	1	0	1	0	0	4

Sheet E	1	2	3	4	5	6	7	8	Final
(Manitoba) Kerri Einarson 🔨	0	1	2	0	1	1	0	0	5
(Ontario) Jacqueline Harrison	3	0	0	2	0	0	1	1	7

==== Draw 10 ====
Friday, December 14, 9:00 a.m.

Sheet A	1	2	3	4	5	6	7	8	9	Final
(Ontario) Rachel Homan 🔨	0	1	1	1	0	0	2	0	1	6
(Ontario) Kerri Einarson	1	0	0	0	1	2	0	1	0	5

Sheet B	1	2	3	4	5	6	7	8	Final
(Japan) Satsuki Fujisawa	1	1	0	2	0	0	3	1	8
(Japan) Sayaka Yoshimura 🔨	0	0	3	0	0	2	0	0	5

Sheet C	1	2	3	4	5	6	7	8	Final
(Alberta) Casey Scheidegger 🔨	0	3	0	0	0	1	0	X	4
(Ontario) Jacqueline Harrison	0	0	2	2	2	0	2	X	8

Sheet D	1	2	3	4	5	6	7	8	Final
(Alberta) Chelsea Carey 🔨	0	0	1	0	2	0	1	0	4
(Sweden) Isabella Wranå	0	1	0	1	0	1	0	2	5

Sheet E	1	2	3	4	5	6	7	8	Final
(Sweden) Anna Hasselborg	2	0	1	2	0	0	0	2	7
(United States) Nina Roth 🔨	0	2	0	0	1	1	1	0	5

==== Draw 11 ====
Friday, December 14, 12:30 p.m.

Sheet B	1	2	3	4	5	6	7	8	Final
(Manitoba) Jennifer Jones 🔨	1	0	2	1	0	1	0	0	5
(Manitoba) Tracy Fleury	0	1	0	0	2	0	1	0	4

==== Draw 13 ====
Friday, December 14, 8:30 p.m.

Sheet B	1	2	3	4	5	6	7	8	Final
(Alberta) Casey Scheidegger 🔨	0	2	0	1	0	0	1	0	4
(Scotland) Eve Muirhead	0	0	2	0	0	1	0	2	5

Sheet C	1	2	3	4	5	6	7	8	Final
(Manitoba) Jennifer Jones	0	5	4	0	1	X	X	X	10
(United States) Jamie Sinclair 🔨	1	0	0	1	0	X	X	X	2

Sheet D	1	2	3	4	5	6	7	8	9	Final
(Sweden) Anna Hasselborg	1	0	1	0	0	2	1	0	1	6
(Switzerland) Silvana Tirinzoni 🔨	0	2	0	2	0	0	0	1	0	5

==== Tiebreaker ====
Saturday, December 15, 11:00 a.m.

Sheet E	1	2	3	4	5	6	7	8	Final
(United States) Jamie Sinclair 🔨	0	0	0	0	X	X	X	X	0
(Manitoba) Kerri Einarson	4	4	3	1	X	X	X	X	12

=== Playoffs ===
Quarterfinals
1	(Sweden) Anna Hasselborg	3
8	(Manitoba) Kerri Einarson	8
4	(Switzerland) Silvana Tirinzoni	9
5	(Japan) Satsuki Fujisawa	6
2	(Ontario) Rachel Homan	6
7	(Ontario) Jacqueline Harrison	4
3	(Scotland) Eve Muirhead	2
6	(Manitoba) Jennifer Jones	5

Semifinals
8	(Manitoba) Kerri Einarson	8
4	(Switzerland) Silvana Tirinzoni	3
2	(Ontario) Rachel Homan	6
6	(Manitoba) Jennifer Jones	2

Final
8	(Manitoba) Kerri Einarson	1
2	(Ontario) Rachel Homan	4

==== Quarterfinals ====
Saturday, December 15, 3:00 p.m.

Sheet A	1	2	3	4	5	6	7	8	Final
(Ontario) Rachel Homan 🔨	0	1	0	3	0	1	0	1	6
(Ontario) Jacqueline Harrison	0	0	2	0	1	0	1	0	4

Player percentages
(Ontario) Rachel Homan		(Ontario) Jacqueline Harrison	
Lisa Weagle	89%	Morgan Court	80%
Joanne Courtney	93%	Lynn Kreviazuk	78%
Emma Miskew	78%	Clancy Grandy	80%
Rachel Homan	97%	Jacqueline Harrison	72%
Total	89%	Total	77%

Sheet B	1	2	3	4	5	6	7	8	Final
(Switzerland) Silvana Tirinzoni	0	1	0	1	0	6	0	1	9
(Japan) Satsuki Fujisawa 🔨	1	0	1	0	2	0	2	0	6

Player percentages
(Switzerland) Silvana Tirinzoni		(Japan) Satsuki Fujisawa	
Melanie Barbezat	65%	Yurika Yoshida	80%
Esther Neuenschwander	86%	Yumi Suzuki	91%
Silvana Tirinzoni	84%	Chinami Yoshida	84%
Alina Pätz	80%	Satsuki Fujisawa	72%
Total	79%	Total	82%

Sheet C	1	2	3	4	5	6	7	8	Final
(Scotland) Eve Muirhead 🔨	1	0	1	0	0	0	0	X	2
(Manitoba) Jennifer Jones	0	2	0	0	1	1	1	X	5

Player percentages
(Scotland) Eve Muirhead		(Manitoba) Jennifer Jones	
Lauren Gray	81%	Dawn McEwen	81%
Vicki Chalmers	80%	Jocelyn Peterman	76%
Jennifer Dodds	74%	Kaitlyn Lawes	87%
Eve Muirhead	66%	Jennifer Jones	84%
Total	76%	Total	82%

Sheet D	1	2	3	4	5	6	7	8	Final
(Sweden) Anna Hasselborg 🔨	2	0	0	0	0	1	0	0	3
(Manitoba) Kerri Einarson	0	0	1	1	1	0	2	3	8

Player percentages
(Sweden) Anna Hasselborg		(Manitoba) Kerri Einarson	
Sofia Mabergs	89%	Briane Meilleur	98%
Agnes Knochenhauer	89%	Shannon Birchard	93%
Sara McManus	83%	Val Sweeting	96%
Anna Hasselborg	65%	Kerri Einarson	92%
Total	81%	Total	95%

==== Semifinals ====
Saturday, December 15, 7:30 p.m.

Sheet A	1	2	3	4	5	6	7	8	Final
(Manitoba) Kerri Einarson	1	0	1	0	5	0	1	X	8
(Switzerland) Silvana Tirinzoni 🔨	0	1	0	1	0	1	0	X	3

Player percentages
(Manitoba) Kerri Einarson		(Switzerland) Silvana Tirinzoni	
Briane Meilleur	84%	Melanie Barbezat	96%
Shannon Birchard	87%	Esther Neuenschwander	95%
Val Sweeting	86%	Silvana Tirinzoni	72%
Kerri Einarson	93%	Alina Pätz	68%
Total	87%	Total	83%

Sheet D	1	2	3	4	5	6	7	8	Final
(Ontario) Rachel Homan 🔨	0	3	0	1	1	0	1	X	6
(Manitoba) Jennifer Jones	0	0	1	0	0	1	0	X	2

Player percentages
(Ontario) Rachel Homan		(Manitoba) Jennifer Jones	
Lisa Weagle	69%	Dawn McEwen	91%
Joanne Courtney	87%	Jocelyn Peterman	70%
Emma Miskew	93%	Kaitlyn Lawes	74%
Rachel Homan	95%	Jennifer Jones	68%
Total	86%	Total	76%

==== Final ====
Sunday, December 16, 5:30 p.m.

Sheet C	1	2	3	4	5	6	7	8	Final
(Manitoba) Kerri Einarson	0	0	0	0	0	0	1	X	1
(Ontario) Rachel Homan 🔨	0	1	1	1	0	1	0	X	4

Player percentages
(Manitoba) Kerri Einarson		(Ontario) Rachel Homan	
Briane Meilleur	82%	Lisa Weagle	85%
Shannon Birchard	80%	Joanne Courtney	88%
Val Sweeting	76%	Emma Miskew	81%
Kerri Einarson	54%	Rachel Homan	70%
Total	73%	Total	81%
