= Ian McMillan (curler) =

Canadian curler (born 1991)

- Curler
- Born: July 17, 1991 (age 35); Dryden, Ontario, Canada

Team
- Curling club: Granite CC, Winnipeg, MB
- Skip: John Epping
- Third: B. J. Neufeld
- Second: Ryan Wiebe
- Lead: Ian McMillan

Curling career
- Member Association: Manitoba (2015–2023; 2026–present); Northern Ontario (2023–2026)
- Brier: 1 (2025)
- Top CTRS ranking: 3rd (2025–26)

Ian McMillan (born July 17, 1991 in Dryden, Ontario) is a Canadian curler from Winnipeg, Manitoba. He currently plays lead on Team John Epping.

== Career ==
McMillan is most notable for winning the 2017 Tour Challenge Tier 2 Grand Slam of Curling event playing second for Jason Gunnlaugson. The team finished sixth on the CTRS standings that season. McMillan left the team the following season and joined the Braden Calvert rink.

Team Calvert had a fairly successful first season together, beginning with the 2018 Icebreaker at The Granite where they won the event title. They also won The Sunova Spiel at East St. Paul and the Thistle Integrity Stakes the following two months and had semifinal appearances at both the DeKalb Superspiel and the KKP Classic. The team also played in three Grand Slam events, failing to qualify for the playoffs in any of them. At the 2019 Viterra Championship, they were eliminated in the championship round. The following season, the team would only win one tour event, the Atkins Curling Supplies Classic, where they went undefeated to claim the title. Elsewhere on tour, the team had semifinal appearances at the 2019 Cargill Curling Training Centre Icebreaker, the 2019 AMJ Campbell Shorty Jenkins Classic, the Mother Club Fall Curling Classic and the 2019 China Open where they represented Canada. Team Calvert only qualified for one slam that season, the 2019 Tour Challenge Tier 2, where they missed the playoffs with a 1–3 record. At the 2020 Viterra Championship, the team failed to qualify for the championship round as they were knocked out in the B Qualifier by 2020 World Junior champion Jacques Gauthier.

During the abbreviated 2020–21 season, Team Calvert played in two events, reaching the semifinals in the Atkins Curling Supplies Classic and missing the playoffs in the MCT Cargill Curling Training Centre Fall Classic. Due to the COVID-19 pandemic in Manitoba, the 2021 provincial championship was cancelled. As the reigning provincials champions, Team Jason Gunnlaugson was chosen to represent Manitoba at the 2021 Tim Hortons Brier. However, due to many provinces cancelling their provincial championships due to the COVID-19 pandemic in Canada, Curling Canada added three Wild Card teams to the national championship, which were based on the CTRS standings from the 2019–20 season. Team Calvert ranked three places to low in the rankings to qualify for the event, ranking just below Glenn Howard, Tanner Horgan and Scott McDonald. The team began the following season with two finals appearances at the Mother Club Fall Curling Classic and the Atkins Curling Supplies Classic, winning the latter. The team also had enough points to qualify for the 2021 Canadian Olympic Curling Pre-Trials for a chance to qualify for the 2021 Canadian Olympic Curling Trials. At the Pre-Trials, they finished with a 2–4 record, missing the playoffs. Due to their early success, Team Calvert qualified for the 2021 National Grand Slam event, where they finished with a 1–3 record. At the 2022 Viterra Championship, the team qualified through the A event with two straight victories, and then won their first championship round game to reach the 1 vs. 2 page qualifier. They then lost two straight games to Mike McEwen and Ryan Wiebe, not qualifying for the playoffs. They wrapped up their season at the 2022 Best of the West where they lost in a tiebreaker to Karsten Sturmay.

At the beginning of the 2024-25 curling season, it was announced that McMillan would be joining the John Epping rink alongside brothers Jacob and Tanner Horgan and curl out of Sudbury in Northern Ontario. In their first year together, the Epping rink would have a strong season, playing in the 2025 Masters grand slam event where they would go 2-2 in the round robin and lose to Korey Dropkin in a tiebreaker. Epping would also go undefeated at the 2025 Northern Ontario Men's Provincial Curling Championship to represent Northern Ontario to the 2025 Montana's Brier. At the Brier, the team would go 6-2 in the round robin, however fail to qualify for the playoffs due to their head-to-head loss to Reid Carruthers to finish 4th in their group.

== Personal life ==
McMillan is employed as a credit manager for Canadian Western Bank.

== Grand Slam record ==
Key
C	Champion
F	Lost in Final
SF	Lost in Semifinal
QF	Lost in Quarterfinals
R16	Lost in the round of 16
Q	Did not advance to playoffs
T2	Played in Tier 2 event
DNP	Did not participate in event
N/A	Not a Grand Slam event that season

Event	2017–18	2018–19	2019–20	2020–21	2021–22	2022–23	2023–24	2024–25	2025–26	2026–27
Invitational	T2	Q	T2	N/A	N/A	DNP	DNP	DNP	SF	QF
Masters	QF	DNP	DNP	N/A	DNP	DNP	DNP	Q	QF	QF
National	QF	Q	DNP	N/A	Q	DNP	DNP	DNP	QF	Q
Open	QF	Q	DNP	N/A	N/A	DNP	DNP	DNP	Q	
Players'	QF	DNP	N/A	DNP	DNP	DNP	DNP	QF	DNP	
Elite 10	Q	DNP	N/A	N/A	N/A	N/A	N/A	N/A	N/A	N/A

== Teams ==
Season	Skip	Third	Second	Lead	Alternate
2015–16	Alex Forrest	Travis Bale	Ian McMillan	Connor Njegovan	
2016–17	Matt Dunstone	Alex Forrest	Ian McMillan	Connor Njegovan	
2017–18	Jason Gunnlaugson	Alex Forrest	Ian McMillan	Connor Njegovan	Justin Richter
2018–19	Braden Calvert	Kyle Kurz	Ian McMillan	Rob Gordon	
2019–20	Braden Calvert	Kyle Kurz	Ian McMillan	Rob Gordon	Justin Richter
2020–21	Braden Calvert	Kyle Kurz	Ian McMillan	Rob Gordon	
2021–22	Braden Calvert	Kyle Kurz	Ian McMillan	Rob Gordon	
2022–23	Braden Calvert	Kyle Kurz	Ian McMillan	Rob Gordon	
2023–24	Tanner Horgan	Jacob Horgan	Ian McMillan	Scott Chadwick	
2024–25	John Epping	Jacob Horgan	Tanner Horgan	Ian McMillan	
2025–26	John Epping	Jacob Horgan	Tanner Horgan	Ian McMillan	
2026–27	John Epping	B. J. Neufeld	Ryan Wiebe	Ian McMillan	
