= Braden Calvert =

Canadian curler (born 1995)

- Curler
- Born: July 16, 1995 (age 31); Brandon, Manitoba

Team
- Curling club: Deer Lodge CC, Winnipeg, MB
- Skip: Braden Calvert
- Third: Corey Chambers
- Second: Kyle Kurz
- Lead: Brendan Bilawka
- Mixed doubles partner: Kelsey Calvert

Curling career
- Member Association: Manitoba
- Brier: 1 (2026)
- Top CTRS ranking: 8th (2025–26)
Medal record
Men's curling
Representing Canada
World Junior Curling Championships
Gold medal – first place	2015 Tallinn

Braden Calvert (born July 16, 1995) is a Canadian curler from Carberry, Manitoba. He currently skips his own team out of Winnipeg. He is a former World Junior curling champion and two-time Canadian junior champion.

== Career ==
=== Juniors ===
Calvert, originally from Winnipeg, won his first provincial junior title in 2014, and skipped Manitoba at the 2014 Canadian Junior Curling Championships. There, his team of Kyle Kurz, Lucas Van Den Bosch and Brendan Wilson lost one game, en route to their first national junior title. In the final, they defeated New Brunswick's Rene Comeau to earn the right to represent Canada at the 2014 World Junior Curling Championships. At the Worlds, they had less success, finishing the round robin with a 6–3 record. This put the team into the playoffs, but they lost to Switzerland in the 3 vs. 4 game, and then lost to Norway in the bronze medal game, settling for fourth place.

The team won their second-straight provincial junior crown in 2015 and represented Manitoba again at 2015 Canadian Junior Curling Championships. Again, the team lost just one game in the round robin, and again won the national title. This time they had to beat Saskatchewan's Jacob Hersikorn rink to earn the right to represent Canada at the 2015 World Junior Curling Championships. They would fare much better at the 2015 World Juniors, losing just one game in the round robin. In the playoffs, they beat Switzerland's Yannick Schwaller twice to claim the gold medal.

Team Calvert played in their first men's provincial championship in 2015 at the 2015 Safeway Championship. Despite just being a junior team, the rink posted a 5-1 record in the knockout tournament, making it to the championship round, where they lost to former World Champion Jeff Stoughton in the 3 vs. 4 game. During the 2015–16 season, Team Calvert had two playoff appearances on the tour. They reached the final of the North Autocorp Thanksgiving Charity Open and the quarterfinals of the Mother Club Fall Curling Classic. The team also competed in the Manitoba Junior provincials where they looked to defend their title for a third straight year but lost in the page playoffs to Derek Oryniak. Calvert played as an alternate for the Trevor Loreth team at the 2016 Viterra Championship, but the team won just two games.

=== Men's ===
Starting in the 2016–17 season, the team aged out of juniors together and moved on to men's play. In their first season out of juniors, the team won their first tour event at the Man Curl Tour Classic. They also reached the finals of the MCT Championships and the Ken Kurbis Galaxy Bonspiel. At the 2017 Viterra Championship, the team missed the playoffs with a 1–2 record.

In their first event of the 2017–18 season, Team Calvert won the Icebreaker at The Granite. Elsewhere on tour, they made the semifinals of both The Sunova Spiel at East St. Paul and the King Spud Classic and the quarterfinals of the MCT Championships and the KKP Classic. Despite their tour success, Team Calvert lost both of their opening games at the 2018 Viterra Championship and were eliminated.

Team Calvert revamped their front end for the 2018–19 season, bringing on Ian McMillan to play second and Rob Gordon to play lead. The team had a fairly successful first season together, beginning with the 2018 Icebreaker at The Granite where they won the event title. They also won The Sunova Spiel at East St. Paul and the Thistle Integrity Stakes the following two months and had semifinal appearances at both the DeKalb Superspiel and the KKP Classic. The team also played in three Grand Slam events, failing to qualify for the playoffs in any of them. At the 2019 Viterra Championship, they were eliminated in the championship round. The following season, the team would only win one tour event, the Atkins Curling Supplies Classic, where they went undefeated to claim the title. Elsewhere on tour, the team had semifinal appearances at the 2019 Cargill Curling Training Centre Icebreaker, the 2019 AMJ Campbell Shorty Jenkins Classic, the Mother Club Fall Curling Classic and the 2019 China Open where they represented Canada. Team Calvert only qualified for one slam that season, the 2019 Tour Challenge Tier 2, where they missed the playoffs with a 1–3 record. At the 2020 Viterra Championship, the team failed to qualify for the championship round as they were knocked out in the B Qualifier by 2020 World Junior champion Jacques Gauthier.

During the abbreviated 2020–21 season, Team Calvert played in two events, reaching the semifinals in the Atkins Curling Supplies Classic and missing the playoffs in the MCT Cargill Curling Training Centre Fall Classic. Due to the COVID-19 pandemic in Manitoba, the 2021 provincial championship was cancelled. As the reigning provincials champions, Team Jason Gunnlaugson was chosen to represent Manitoba at the 2021 Tim Hortons Brier. However, due to many provinces cancelling their provincial championships due to the COVID-19 pandemic in Canada, Curling Canada added three Wild Card teams to the national championship, which were based on the CTRS standings from the 2019–20 season. Team Calvert ranked three places to low in the rankings to qualify for the event, ranking just below Glenn Howard, Tanner Horgan and Scott McDonald. The team began the following season with two finals appearances at the Mother Club Fall Curling Classic and the Atkins Curling Supplies Classic, winning the latter. The team also had enough points to qualify for the 2021 Canadian Olympic Curling Pre-Trials for a chance to qualify for the 2021 Canadian Olympic Curling Trials. At the Pre-Trials, they finished with a 2–4 record, missing the playoffs. Due to their early success, Team Calvert qualified for the 2021 National Grand Slam event, where they finished with a 1–3 record. At the 2022 Viterra Championship, the team qualified through the A event with two straight victories, and then won their first championship round game to reach the 1 vs. 2 page qualifier. They then lost two straight games to Mike McEwen and Ryan Wiebe, not qualifying for the playoffs. They wrapped up their season at the 2022 Best of the West where they lost in a tiebreaker to Karsten Sturmay.

Starting in the 2023–24 curling season, Calvert formed a new team with Corey Chambers as third, Kyle Kurz as second, and Brendan Bilawka as lead. In their first season together, they would compete in the 2024 Viterra Championship, where they would go undefeated until losing to Team Carruthers 6–3 in the final. The following season, Team Calvert would continue to find success on the Manitoba Curling Tour, winning the Atkins Curling Supplies Classic, DeKalb Superspiel, MCT Showdown, and MCT Championships. Calvert would again compete in the 2025 Viterra Championship, where they would again go undefeated before losing to Carruthers in the final. Their results over the past two seasons would qualify Team Calvert for the 2025 Canadian Olympic Curling Pre-Trials. At the Pre-Trials, Calvert would have a strong week - finishing first in the round robin with a 5–2 record, but would finish in second place, losing to Manitoba rival Jordon McDonald 2–1 in the best-of-three final for the sole spot at the Olympic Trails. They would also play in the 2026 Bunge Championship, the Manitoba men's provincials, where they would again face provincial rivals Team McDonald in the final, but this time would win 10–7 in an extra end. This was Calvert's first Manitoba men's title, qualifying the team to represent Manitoba at the 2026 Montana's Brier. At the Brier, the team made it to the championship round, where they were eliminated by defending champion (and the Olympic gold medallist) Brad Jacobs rink.

== Personal life ==
Calvert is the owner of Calvert Cattle Co. He is married to fellow curler Kelsey Calvert, and has one daughter.

== Grand Slam record ==
Key
C	Champion
F	Lost in Final
SF	Lost in Semifinal
QF	Lost in Quarterfinals
R16	Lost in the round of 16
Q	Did not advance to playoffs
T2	Played in Tier 2 event
DNP	Did not participate in event
N/A	Not a Grand Slam event that season

Event	2018–19	2019–20	2020–21	2021–22
Tour Challenge	Q	T2	N/A	N/A
The National	Q	DNP	N/A	Q
Canadian Open	Q	DNP	N/A	N/A

== Teams ==
Season	Skip	Third	Second	Lead
2013–14	Braden Calvert	Kyle Kurz	Lucas Van Den Bosch	Brendan Wilson
2014–15	Braden Calvert	Kyle Kurz	Lucas Van Den Bosch	Brendan Wilson
2015–16	Braden Calvert	Kyle Kurz	Connor McIntyre	Colin Kurz
2016–17	Braden Calvert	Kyle Kurz	Lucas Van Den Bosch	Brendan Wilson
2017–18	Braden Calvert	Kyle Kurz	Lucas Van Den Bosch	Brendan Wilson
2018–19	Braden Calvert	Kyle Kurz	Ian McMillan	Rob Gordon
2019–20	Braden Calvert	Kyle Kurz	Ian McMillan	Rob Gordon
2020–21	Braden Calvert	Kyle Kurz	Ian McMillan	Rob Gordon
2021–22	Braden Calvert	Kyle Kurz	Ian McMillan	Rob Gordon
2022–23	Braden Calvert	Kyle Kurz	Ian McMillan	Rob Gordon
2023–24	Braden Calvert	Corey Chambers	Kyle Kurz	Brendan Bilawka
2024–25	Braden Calvert	Corey Chambers	Kyle Kurz	Brendan Bilawka
2025–26	Braden Calvert	Corey Chambers	Kyle Kurz	Brendan Bilawka
2026–27	Braden Calvert	Corey Chambers	Kyle Kurz	Brendan Bilawka
