= Atkins Curling Supplies Classic =

Annual curling tournament in Canada

- Established: 2009
- Host city: Winnipeg, Manitoba
- Arena: Assiniboine Memorial CC
- Men's purse: $11,000
- Women's purse: $10,500

Current champions (2026)
- Men: (Manitoba) Jace Freeman
- Women: (Manitoba) Kelsey Calvert

Location in Canada

The Atkins Curling Supplies Classic (formerly the Atkins Curling Supplies Women's Classic and the Atkins Curling Supplies Charity Classic) is an annual bonspiel, or curling tournament, that takes place at the Assiniboine Memorial Curling Club in Winnipeg, Manitoba. The event has also been hosted by the Charleswood Curling Club in Winnipeg and the East St. Paul Curling Club in East St. Paul, Manitoba. The tournament is held in a round-robin format and was part of the World Curling Tour from 2012 to 2019. It began in 2007. Prior to this it was just part of the Manitoba Curling Tour.

A men's event was added for 2017.

While the 2020 event still occurred during the COVID-19 pandemic, it was discontinued as a World Curling Tour event.

== Past champions ==
=== Women ===
Only skip's name is displayed.

Year	Winning team	Runner up team	Purse (CAD)	Host
2009	(Manitoba) Janet Harvey	(Manitoba) Kaileigh Strath	$14,000	Charleswood CC
2010	(Manitoba) Jackie Komyshyn	(Manitoba) Kim Link	$10,600	Charleswood CC
2011	(Manitoba) Janet Harvey	(Manitoba) Shannon Birchard	$15,600	East St. Paul CC
2012	(Manitoba) Kate Cameron	(Manitoba) Kerri Einarson	$15,000	East St. Paul CC
2013	(Manitoba) Darcy Robertson	(Ontario) Jill Thurston	$16,000	East St. Paul CC
2014	(Manitoba) Janet Harvey	(Manitoba) Colleen Kilgallen	$16,000	East St. Paul CC
2015	(Manitoba) Darcy Robertson	(Manitoba) Barb Spencer	$16,000	East St. Paul CC
2016	(Manitoba) Beth Peterson	(Manitoba) Darcy Robertson	$17,900	Assiniboine Memorial CC
2017	(Manitoba) Darcy Robertson	(Manitoba) Barb Spencer	$10,000	Assiniboine Memorial CC
2018	(Manitoba) Barb Spencer	(Manitoba) Kristy Watling	$9,400	Assiniboine Memorial CC
2019	(Manitoba) Abby Ackland	(Manitoba) Beth Peterson	$6,200	Assiniboine Memorial CC
2020	(Manitoba) Mackenzie Zacharias	(Manitoba) Darcy Robertson	$3,200	Assiniboine Memorial CC
2021	(United States) Jamie Sinclair	(Manitoba) Kristy Watling	$6,000	Assiniboine Memorial CC
2022	(Manitoba) Beth Peterson	(Manitoba) Abby Ackland	$5,000	Assiniboine Memorial CC
2023	(Manitoba) Lisa McLeod	(Manitoba) Emily Cherwinski	$10,000	Assiniboine Memorial CC
2024	(South Korea) Kim Su-hyeon	(Manitoba) Darcy Robertson	$10,000	Assiniboine Memorial CC
2025	(United States) Kim Rhyme	(Manitoba) Hailey McFarlane	$9,000	Assiniboine Memorial CC
2026	(Manitoba) Kelsey Calvert	(Manitoba) Christine MacKay	$10,500	Assiniboine Memorial CC

=== Men's ===
Year	Winning team	Runner up team	Purse (CAD)	Host
2017	(Manitoba) David Bohn	(Manitoba) Jordan Smith	$8,800	Assiniboine Memorial CC
2018	(Manitoba) Corey Chambers	(Manitoba) Ty Dilello	$10,000	Assiniboine Memorial CC
2019	(Manitoba) Braden Calvert	(United States) Korey Dropkin	$12,300	Assiniboine Memorial CC
2020	(Manitoba) Jordon McDonald	(Manitoba) Ryan Wiebe	$6,400	Assiniboine Memorial CC
2021	(Manitoba) Braden Calvert	(United States) Rich Ruohonen	$9,000	Assiniboine Memorial CC
2022	(Manitoba) Zachary Wasylik	(Manitoba) Corey Chambers	$8,000	Assiniboine Memorial CC
2023	(Manitoba) Braden Calvert	(Manitoba) Steve Irwin	$10,000	Assiniboine Memorial CC
2024	(Manitoba) Braden Calvert	(United States) Scott Dunnam	$10,000	Assiniboine Memorial CC
2025	(Manitoba) Steve Irwin	(Manitoba) Tanner Lott	$9,000	Assiniboine Memorial CC
2026	(Manitoba) Jace Freeman	(Manitoba) Hayden Forrester	$11,000	Assiniboine Memorial CC
