= Connor Njegovan =

Canadian curler (born 1992)

- Curler
- Born: June 23, 1992 (age 34); Winnipeg, Manitoba, Canada

Team
- Curling club: Granite CC, Winnipeg, MB

Curling career
- Member Association: Manitoba
- Brier: 6 (2020, 2021, 2022, 2023, 2024, 2025)
- Top CTRS ranking: 5th (2021–22, 2022–23)

Connor Njegovan (born June 23, 1992) is a Canadian curler from Winnipeg, Manitoba.

== Career ==
=== Juniors ===
Njegovan made his first and only Canadian Junior Curling Championships appearance in 2010 playing second for the Alex Forrest rink. The team finished the round robin in first place only suffering two losses to Northern Ontario and Saskatchewan. This meant the team had an automatic bye to the final. There, they faced Ontario who they had previously beaten in the round robin. The team gave up two in the final end to lose the game 8–7. Njegovan curled an average 81% during the round robin.

=== Men's ===
Njegovan played for the Jeff Stoughton rink for the 2014–15 season, which would be Stoughton's last. The team played in four Grand Slam of Curling events but only qualified in one, the 2014 Masters. At the 2015 Manitoba provincials, the team qualified for the championship round as the third seed. They defeated Braden Calvert 6–4 in the 3 vs. 4 game before being eliminated in the semi-final by the Mike McEwen rink.

The following year at the 2016 Viterra Championship, his rink of Alex Forrest, Travis Bale and Ian McMillan failed to make the final four championship round after losing the Double Knockout qualifier against Matt Dunstone 7–3. Njegovan joined Dunstone the following season with Forrest and McMillan to try to qualify for the Brier again at the 2017 Viterra Championship. But once again, his team would be bested in the Double Knockout round, this time to Jason Gunnlaugson.

For the 2017–18 season, Njegovan would once again stay with Forrest and McMillan but would bring on Gunnlaugson to skip the team. The team had a successful Grand Slam season, playing in every slam and qualifying in six of their seven events including winning the 2017 Tour Challenge Tier 2. However at the 2018 Viterra Championship, the team struggled going 1–2 in the Double Knockout bracket and missing the playoffs. The team had a less successful following season, only playing five slam and qualifying in one of them. At this years provincials, the team qualified for the Championship Round as the number one seed. But they fell apart in the playoffs, losing the 1 vs. 2 game against Carruthers and the semifinal against Lyburn. The team did get to represent Canada at the Second Leg of the 2018-19 Curling World Cup, where they went 1–5.

The team won the 2019 Cargill Curling Training Centre Icebreaker to start the 2019–20 season. They also won the Mother Club Fall Curling Classic and the Ed Werenich Golden Wrench Classic. Njegovan won his first Provincial title at the 2020 Viterra Championship after defeating the Mike McEwen rink 7–4 in the final. Team Gunnlaugson represented Manitoba at the 2020 Tim Hortons Brier, where they finished in eighth place with a 5–6 record. It would be the team's last event of the season as both the Players' Championship and the Champions Cup Grand Slam events were cancelled due to the COVID-19 pandemic.

Due to the COVID-19 pandemic in Manitoba, the 2021 provincial championship was cancelled. As the reigning provincial champions, Team Gunnlaugson was chosen to represent Manitoba at the 2021 Tim Hortons Brier. At the Brier, they finished with a 6–6 record.

== Coaching ==
During the 2019–20 season, Njegovan coached the Sayaka Yoshimura team from Japan. He coached them to a bronze medal finish at the 2020 Japan Curling Championships and a runner-up finish at the 2019 Masters Grand Slam event.

He also coaches his wife Selena's rink, team Kaitlyn Lawes.

== Personal life ==
Njegovan is married to fellow curler Selena Njegovan, and has one son. He is currently a real estate agent He attended the University of Manitoba.

== Teams ==
Season	Skip	Third	Second	Lead
2009–10	Alex Forrest	Joey Witherspoon	Connor Njegovan	Mike Neufeld
2011–12	Joey Witherspoon	Connor Njegovan	Taylor McIntyre	Brett Brezden
2012–13	Kyle Doering	Connor Njegovan	Derek Oryniak	Kyle Kurz
2013–14	William Lyburn	Alex Forrest	Connor Njegovan	Tyler Forrest
2014–15	Jeff Stoughton	Rob Fowler	Alex Forrest	Connor Njegovan
2015–16	Alex Forrest	Travis Bale	Ian McMillan	Connor Njegovan
2016–17	Matt Dunstone	Alex Forrest	Ian McMillan	Connor Njegovan
2017–18	Jason Gunnlaugson	Alex Forrest	Ian McMillan	Connor Njegovan
2018–19	Jason Gunnlaugson	Alex Forrest	Denni Neufeld	Connor Njegovan
2019–20	Jason Gunnlaugson	Alex Forrest	Adam Casey	Connor Njegovan
2020–21	Jason Gunnlaugson	Adam Casey	Matt Wozniak	Connor Njegovan
2021–22	Jason Gunnlaugson	Adam Casey	Matt Wozniak	Connor Njegovan
2022–23	Reid Carruthers	Jason Gunnlaugson (2022); Brad Jacobs (2023)	Derek Samagalski	Connor Njegovan
2023–24	Brad Jacobs	Reid Carruthers	Derek Samagalski	Connor Njegovan
2024–25	Reid Carruthers	Catlin Schneider; B. J. Neufeld (from Jan. 2025)	Derek Samagalski (until Nov. 2024); Kyle Doering (from Nov. 2024); Catlin Schneider	Connor Njegovan
2025–26	Reid Carruthers	B. J. Neufeld	Catlin Schneider	Connor Njegovan
