= Jason Gunnlaugson =

Canadian curler (born 1984)

- Curler
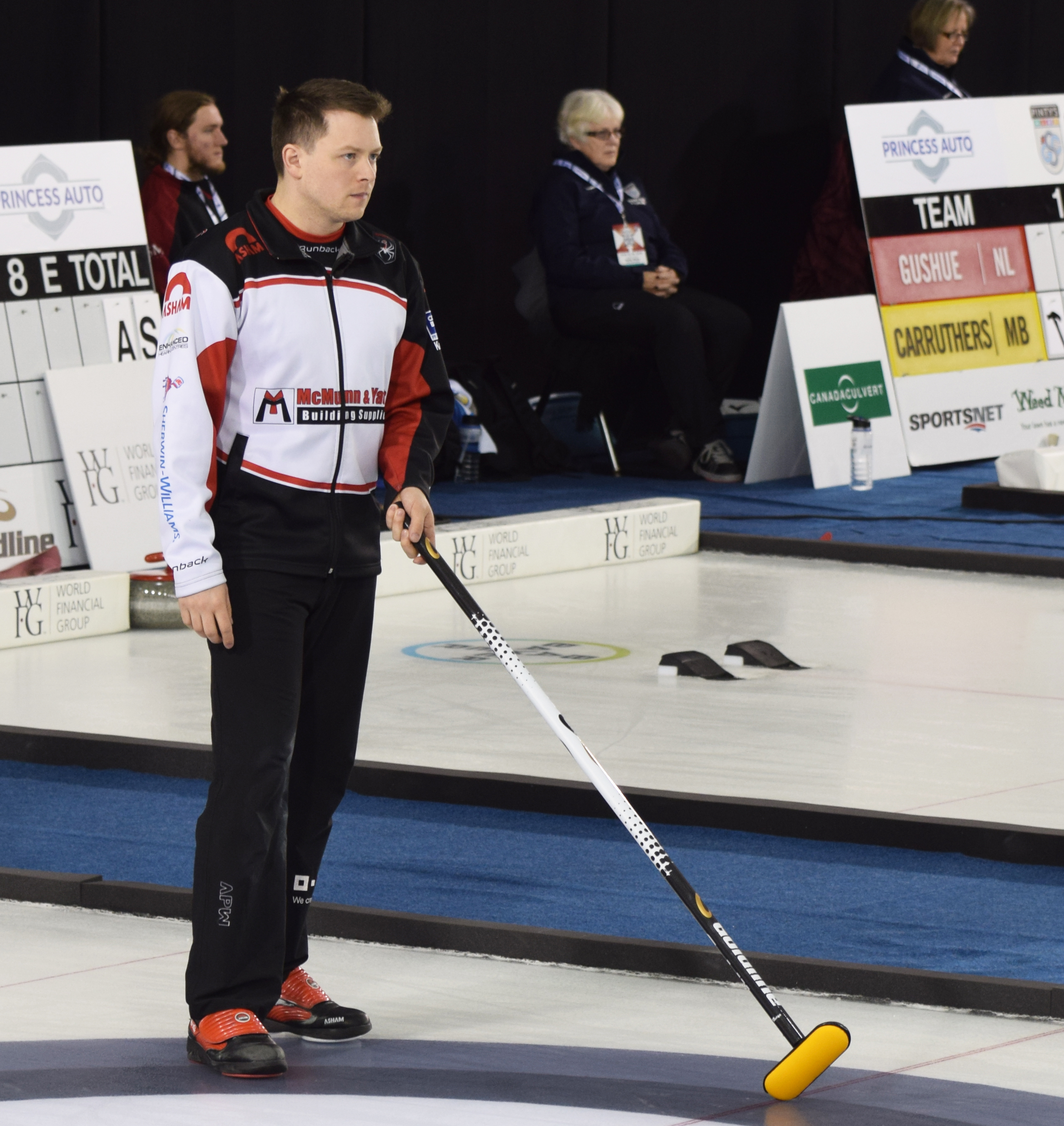
- Jason Gunnlaugson skips his team in 2018.
- Born: July 2, 1984 (age 42); Winnipeg, Manitoba

Team
- Curling club: Granite CC, Winnipeg, MB

Curling career
- Member Association: Manitoba (2004–2010; 2011–2012; 2014–present); Russia (2010–2011); British Columbia (2012–2014)
- Brier: 3 (2020, 2021, 2022)
- Top CTRS ranking: 5th (2021–22, 2022–23)
Medal record
Men's curling
Representing British Columbia
Canadian Olympic Curling Trials
Silver medal – second place	2013 Winnipeg
Representing Moscow
Russian Men's Curling Cup
Gold medal – first place	2010 Tver

Jason Gunnlaugson is a Canadian curler currently living in Winnipeg, Manitoba.

Gunnlaugson is known for having been hired by the Russian Curling Federation (RCF) to represent the country at the 2014 Winter Olympics. The deal which was announced in April 2010 fell through in November that year, when the Gunnlaugson team was fired by the RCF.

== Career ==
Prior to his deal to play for Russia, Gunnlaugson had skipped his team out of Beausejour, Manitoba. In 2009, Gunnlaugson took over the reins of Daley Peters's team when Peters left the team to curl with his father Vic Peters. Gunnlaugson had been a member of the Peters team solely for the 2008-09 season, prior to that he had played third on the Reid Carruthers team.

Gunnlaugson acquired a berth at the 2009 Olympic Pre-Trials through his CTRS ranking from September 2007 to April 2009, highest of teams not already qualified. Most of those points were acquired earlier as part of the Reid Carruthers team, the Gunnlaugson team was the last team to qualify for the pre-trials. The four-some surprised many by being one of the four teams to qualify for the main Olympic trials, defeating Mike McEwen with the last rock in the extra end of the 'C' Final. However, at the trials, the team finished winless, with an 0-7 record.

Coming from curling strong Manitoba, Gunnlaugson won the Viterra Provincial Championships for the first time in 2020 to play in the Brier. He also played second for Manitoba (skipped by Carruthers) at the 2008 Canadian Mixed Curling Championship.

Gunnlaugson is well known in the curling community for his up-weight peel shots. He is able to throw a rock with a 4-second peel (time measured from hogline to hogline). Some of his shots at the 2008 Canadian Mixed Tournament were captured on YouTube. His teammates were unable to keep up with the speed of the rock.

=== Joining the Russians ===
On April 28, 2010 Jason Gunnlaugson announced his deal with the Russian Curling Federation. The negotiations were for Jason Gunnlaugson and teammates Tyler Forrest and Justin Richter to pair with two Russian curlers (Alexey Stukalskiy and Aleksandr Kozyrev) to create a Russian team to qualify for the 2014 Sochi Olympic Games. The deal involved each of the players earning $100,000 to train.

In November 2010, Gunnlaugson won the Russian Men's Curling Cup. His team defeated Artem Shmakov's Chelyabinsk rink in the final by a score of 7-1.

However, later that month, Gunnlaugson, Forrest and Richter refused to renounce their Canadian citizenships in order to fast track their acquiring of Russian citizenships in order to play at the 2010 European Curling Championships. After that, the Russian Curling Federation fired the three Canadians.

The Canadian Curling Association ruled that despite winning the Russian cup, the team would still be eligible to compete for the Brier, Canada's national championship. However, the team was eliminated from even playing in the Manitoba provincial championship, after failing to qualify out of their zone.

=== Relocating to British Columbia ===
At the end of the 2011-12 curling season, Gunnlaugson relocated to British Columbia after taking a job with his uncle's company. Initially Gunnlaugson was planning to take a year off from competing. For the 2012-13 season Gunnlaugson teamed up with Jim Cotter, playing third and replacing Kevin Folk who moved to Calgary. The team won one event together, the 2012 Prestige Hotels & Resorts Curling Classic. They also played in four slams, making it to the finals of the 2012 Rogers Masters of Curling. The arrangement would only last one season. Gunnlaugson would remain as the team's alternate for part of the 2013-14 season, after John Morris was added to the team. He was their alternate at the 2013 Canadian Olympic Curling Trials but was replaced by Jody Epp for the 2014 Tim Hortons Brier.

=== Back to Manitoba ===
Gunnlaugson returned to Manitoba in 2014, eventually joining the William Lyburn rink at third for one season. The team won the MCT Championships and would place fourth at the 2016 Manitoba provincial men's championship. Gunnlaugson left the rink after the season, and formed a new team, skipping a rink consisting of Colton Lott, Kyle Doering and Robbie Gordon. The team won the Performance Spider Midweek Special and finished fourth at the 2017 Viterra Championship, Manitoba's provincial championship.

After the 2016-17 curling season, Gunnlaugson formed a new team of Alex Forrest, Ian McMillan and Connor Njegovan. Early on in the 2017-18 curling season, the team won the 2017 GSOC Tour Challenge Tier 2 event, defeating Gunnlaugson's former skip, William Lyburn in the final. That season, they also won the Mother Club Fall Curling Classic and the MCT Championships. The team played in the 2017 Olympic Pre-trials. There, they went 3-3 in the round robin portion, putting them in a tiebreaker against Jamie Murphy. They beat Murphy, but lost in the B quarterfinals against Glenn Howard. Gunnlaugson was invited to play as Brendan Bottcher's alternate at the main trials, but the team failed to qualify for the playoffs. Later in the season, at the 2018 Viterra Championship provincial playdowns, the Gunnlaugson rink was eliminated after only three games. In mixed doubles play, Gunnlaugson and partner Shannon Birchard won the Pacific Northwest Mixed Doubles Invitational.

In 2018, Denni Neufeld was added to the team, replacing McMillan. In the 2018-19 curling season, the team represented Canada at the second leg of the 2018-19 Curling World Cup, but finished the event with a 1-5 record, in last place. They had more success at the 2019 Viterra Championship, making it to the semifinal, where they lost to William Lyburn. On the tour, the team played in the 2018 Elite 10, the 2018 Masters, the 2018 Tour Challenge, the 2018 National, the 2019 Canadian Open, only making it to the playoffs at the National.

In 2019, the team added Adam Casey, replacing Neufeld. The team won the 2019 Cargill Curling Training Centre Icebreaker at the start of the 2019-20 season. They also won the Mother Club Fall Curling Classic and the Ed Werenich Golden Wrench Classic. Gunnlaugson won his first Provincial title at the 2020 Viterra Championship after defeating the Mike McEwen rink 7–4 in the final. Team Gunnlaugson represented Manitoba at the 2020 Tim Hortons Brier, where they finished in eighth place with a 5–6 record. It would be the team's last event of the season as both the Players' Championship and the Champions Cup Grand Slam events were cancelled due to the COVID-19 pandemic. Following the season, the rink added Matt Wozniak at second, with Casey moving to third, replacing Forrest.

Due to the COVID-19 pandemic in Manitoba, the 2021 provincial championship was cancelled. As the reigning provincial champions, Team Gunnlaugson was chosen to represent Manitoba at the 2021 Tim Hortons Brier. At the Brier, Gunnlaugson led his team to a 6–6 eighth place finish. The team wrapped up the season by playing in the 2021 Champions Cup and the 2021 Players' Championship.

The next season, the team won the 2021 Canadian Olympic Curling Pre-Trials to qualify the rink for the 2021 Canadian Olympic Curling Trials. At the Trials, Gunnlaugson led his rink to a 2–6 record, missing the playoffs. The team played in the 2022 Viterra Championship, but were eliminated after winning just two games. Despite this, they qualified for the 2022 Tim Hortons Brier as a Wild Card team. Gunnlaugson led his team to a 5–3 record at the Brier, and qualified for the championship after winning a tiebreaker. However, they were eliminated after losing their first game against Team Canada, skipped by Brendan Bottcher. On the tour, the team won the 2021 DeKalb Superspiel, and played in the 2021 Masters, the 2021 National, the 2022 Players' Championship and the 2022 Champions Cup, making it to the quarters in the last two events.

In April 2022, it was announced that Gunnlaugson and his rink were splitting up, and he would be joining a new team skipped by Reid Carruthers.

On December 19, 2022 it was announced that Gunnlaugson had left the Carruthers rink.

== Personal life ==
Gunnlaugson is employed as a business owner for DV Painting. He is married to fellow curler Theresa Cannon. Jason's father Darryl Gunnlaugson curled with Jeff Stoughton in 1994-95, was fifth for Stoughton when they won the world championship in 1995-96, and was again fifth in 1999-2000 when they won Manitoba and finished fourth in Canada. Jason's grandfather, Darryl's father Lloyd Gunnlaugson, was Manitoba men's champion in 1983 at age 54, and was Canadian senior men's champion in 1982, 83, and 84.

== Teams ==
Season	Skip	Third	Second	Lead	Alternate
2004–05	Dan Kammerlock	Jason Gunnlaugson	Derek Samagalski	Dan McKenzie	
2005–06	Reid Carruthers	Jason Gunnlaugson	Derek Samagalski	Tyler Forrest	
2006–07	Reid Carruthers	Jason Gunnlaugson	Justin Richter	Tyler Forrest	
2007–08	Reid Carruthers	Jason Gunnlaugson	Justin Richter	Tyler Forrest	
2008–09	Daley Peters	Jason Gunnlaugson	Justin Richter	Tyler Forrest	
2009–10	Jason Gunnlaugson	Justin Richter	Braden Zawada	Tyler Forrest	
2010–11	Jason Gunnlaugson	Justin Richter	Tyler Forrest	Alexey Stukalsky	
2011–12	Jason Gunnlaugson	Justin Richter	Jason Ackerman	David Kraichy	
2012–13	Jim Cotter	Jason Gunnlaugson	Tyrel Griffith	Rick Sawatsky	
2013	Jim Cotter	John Morris	Tyrel Griffith	Rick Sawatsky	Jason Gunnlaugson (replaced by Jody Epp at Brier)
2014–15	Jason Gunnlaugson	Colton Lott	Kyle Doering	Rob Gordon	Matt Dunstone
2015–16	William Lyburn	Jason Gunnlaugson	Richard Daneault	Braden Zawada	
2016–17	Jason Gunnlaugson	Colton Lott	Kyle Doering	Rob Gordon	
2017–18	Jason Gunnlaugson	Alex Forrest	Ian McMillan	Connor Njegovan	
2018–19	Jason Gunnlaugson	Alex Forrest	Denni Neufeld	Connor Njegovan	
2019–20	Jason Gunnlaugson	Alex Forrest	Adam Casey	Connor Njegovan	
2020–21	Jason Gunnlaugson	Adam Casey	Matt Wozniak	Connor Njegovan	
2021–22	Jason Gunnlaugson	Adam Casey	Matt Wozniak	Connor Njegovan	Rob Gordon
2022–23	Reid Carruthers	Jason Gunnlaugson	Derek Samagalski	Connor Njegovan	

== Grand Slam record ==
Key
C	Champion
F	Lost in Final
SF	Lost in Semifinal
QF	Lost in Quarterfinals
R16	Lost in the round of 16
Q	Did not advance to playoffs
T2	Played in Tier 2 event
DNP	Did not participate in event
N/A	Not a Grand Slam event that season

Event	2007–08	2008–09	2009–10	2010–11	2011–12	2012–13	2013–14	2014–15	2015–16	2016–17	2017–18	2018–19	2019–20	2020–21	2021–22	2022–23
Elite 10	N/A	N/A	N/A	N/A	N/A	N/A	N/A	DNP	DNP	DNP	Q	Q	N/A	N/A	N/A	N/A
The National	Q	DNP	Q	DNP	DNP	Q	DNP	DNP	DNP	DNP	QF	QF	DNP	N/A	Q	Q
Tour Challenge	N/A	N/A	N/A	N/A	N/A	N/A	N/A	N/A	DNP	T2	T2	Q	Q	N/A	N/A	QF
Masters	Q	DNP	DNP	DNP	DNP	F	DNP	DNP	DNP	DNP	QF	Q	DNP	N/A	Q	Q
Canadian Open	DNP	DNP	Q	DNP	DNP	QF	DNP	DNP	DNP	DNP	QF	Q	Q	N/A	N/A	DNP
Players'	Q	DNP	Q	DNP	DNP	QF	DNP	DNP	DNP	DNP	QF	DNP	N/A	Q	QF	DNP
Champions Cup	N/A	N/A	N/A	N/A	N/A	N/A	N/A	N/A	DNP	DNP	QF	DNP	N/A	Q	QF	DNP
