= 2024 Manitoba Scotties Tournament of Hearts =

Canadian women's provincial curling championship

2024 Manitoba Scotties Tournament of Hearts presented by RME
- Host city: Morden, Manitoba
- Arena: Access Event Centre
- Dates: January 24–28
- Winner: Team Lawes
- Curling club: Fort Rouge CC, Winnipeg
- Skip: Kaitlyn Lawes
- Third: Selena Njegovan
- Second: Jocelyn Peterman
- Lead: Kristin MacCuish
- Coach: Connor Njegovan
- Finalist: Beth Peterson

The 2024 Manitoba Scotties Tournament of Hearts presented by RME, the provincial women's curling championship for Manitoba, was held from January 24 to 28 at the Access Event Centre in Morden, Manitoba. The winning Kaitlyn Lawes rink represented Manitoba at the 2024 Scotties Tournament of Hearts, Canada's national women's curling championship in Calgary, Alberta.

== Qualification process ==
Qualification method	Berths	Qualifying team(s)
2023 Manitoba Scotties Champion	~~1~~	n/a (Note: The defending provincial champions, Team Jennifer Jones received one of the pre-qualification berths for the 2024 Scotties, and therefore did not have to complete in the playdown process. A second spot was allocated to the 2023-24 CTRS leaders in place of the defending provincial champion.)
2022-23 CTRS leader	1	Kaitlyn Lawes
2023-24 CTRS leaders	2	Kate Cameron; Beth Peterson
Berth Bonspiel	1	Kristy Watling
MCT Berth 2023	2	Jolene Campbell; Lisa McLeod
West Qualifier	1	Tiffany Armstrong
South Qualifier	1	Shaela Hayward
Winnipeg Qualifier	4	Emily Cherwinski; Emma Jensen; Rachel Kaatz; Zoey Terrick

== Teams ==
The teams are listed as follows:

Skip	Third	Second	Lead	Alternate	Coach	Club
Tiffany Armstrong	Morgan Kropelnicki	Stacy Sime	Tamara Kolida	Cassandra Lesiuk		Dauphin CC, Dauphin
Kate Cameron	Meghan Walter	Taylor McDonald	Mackenzie Elias	Mackenzie Zacharias		Granite Curling Club, Winnipeg
Jolene Campbell	Abby Ackland	Rachel Erickson	Sara Oliver			Assiniboine Memorial CC, Winnipeg
Emily Cherwinski	Lauren Evason	Eryn Czirfusz	Maddy Hollins	Mackenzie Arbuckle	Calvin Edie	Assiniboine Memorial CC, Winnipeg
Shaela Hayward	Keira Krahn	India Young	Rylie Cox	Diane Hayward	Ron Westcott	Carman CC, Carman
Emma Jensen	Lane Prokopowich	Becky Friesen	Stephanie Feelus	Katie McKenzie	Alan Jensen	Heather CC, Winnipeg
Rachel Kaatz	Jenna Boisvert	Gaetanne Gauthier	Kadriana Lott	Sarah-Jane Sass	Cathy Gauthier	Assiniboine Memorial CC, Winnipeg
Kaitlyn Lawes	Selena Njegovan	Jocelyn Peterman	Kristin MacCuish		Connor Njegovan	Fort Rouge CC, Winnipeg
Lisa McLeod	Janelle Lach	Hallie McCannell	Jolene Callum	Hailey McFarlane	Lyall Hudson	Portage CC, Portage la Prairie
Beth Peterson	Kelsey Rocque	Katherine Doerksen	Melissa Gordon-Kurz	Jenna Loder	Kyle Kurz	Assiniboine Memorial CC, Winnipeg
Zoey Terrick	Cassidy Dundas	Tessa Terrick	Jensen Letham	Jaycee Terrick	Clint Cullen	Heather CC, Winnipeg
Kristy Watling	Laura Burtnyk	Emily Deschenes	Sarah Pyke		Jim Watling	East St. Paul CC, East St. Paul

== Round robin standings ==
Final Round Robin Standings

Key
Teams to Championship Round

Asham Black Group
Skip	W	L	PF	PA	EW	EL	BE	SE
Kaitlyn Lawes	5	0	50	12	22	11	2	8
Beth Peterson	3	2	36	31	19	16	1	6
Kristy Watling	3	2	28	34	18	20	0	5
Shaela Hayward	3	2	40	36	21	19	0	8
Emma Jensen	1	4	30	39	17	22	1	6
Emily Cherwinski	0	5	18	50	15	24	1	4

Asham Express Red Group
Skip	W	L	PF	PA	EW	EL	BE	SE
Kate Cameron	5	0	38	13	21	13	5	9
Jolene Campbell	4	1	41	17	25	12	2	13
Zoey Terrick	3	2	29	35	20	23	0	6
Lisa McLeod	2	3	30	28	21	20	1	8
Tiffany Armstrong	1	4	21	36	16	20	1	4
Rachel Kaatz	0	5	18	48	11	26	1	1

== Round robin results ==
All draws are listed in Central Time (UTC−06:00).

=== Draw 1 ===
Wednesday, January 24, 8:30 am

Sheet A	1	2	3	4	5	6	7	8	9	10	Final
Shaela Hayward	0	1	0	0	1	0	X	X	X	X	2
Kaitlyn Lawes	1	0	4	3	0	4	X	X	X	X	12

Sheet B	1	2	3	4	5	6	7	8	9	10	Final
Beth Peterson	0	2	3	0	2	3	X	X	X	X	10
Emma Jensen	1	0	0	1	0	0	X	X	X	X	2

Sheet C	1	2	3	4	5	6	7	8	9	10	Final
Kristy Watling	0	1	1	0	3	0	2	0	X	X	7
Emily Cherwinski	1	0	0	0	0	1	0	1	X	X	3

=== Draw 2 ===
Wednesday, January 24, 12:15 pm

Sheet A	1	2	3	4	5	6	7	8	9	10	Final
Tiffany Armstrong	0	0	1	0	0	1	0	X	X	X	2
Kate Cameron	1	2	0	0	2	0	4	X	X	X	9

Sheet B	1	2	3	4	5	6	7	8	9	10	Final
Jolene Campbell	0	0	1	2	0	2	3	2	X	X	10
Zoey Terrick	0	1	0	0	1	0	0	0	X	X	2

Sheet C	1	2	3	4	5	6	7	8	9	10	Final
Lisa McLeod	2	2	4	1	0	2	X	X	X	X	11
Rachel Kaatz	0	0	0	0	3	0	X	X	X	X	3

=== Draw 3 ===
Wednesday, January 24, 4:00 pm

Sheet A	1	2	3	4	5	6	7	8	9	10	Final
Emily Cherwinski	0	1	1	1	1	0	0	0	X	X	4
Emma Jensen	4	0	0	0	0	3	2	3	X	X	12

Sheet B	1	2	3	4	5	6	7	8	9	10	Final
Kaitlyn Lawes	2	1	0	3	2	2	X	X	X	X	10
Kristy Watling	0	0	1	0	0	0	X	X	X	X	1

Sheet C	1	2	3	4	5	6	7	8	9	10	Final
Beth Peterson	0	1	0	0	0	X	X	X	X	X	1
Shaela Hayward	3	0	4	1	5	X	X	X	X	X	13

=== Draw 4 ===
Wednesday, January 24, 8:00 pm

Sheet A	1	2	3	4	5	6	7	8	9	10	11	Final
Rachel Kaatz	0	4	0	1	0	2	0	1	0	0	0	8
Zoey Terrick	1	0	1	0	1	0	2	0	2	1	1	9

Sheet B	1	2	3	4	5	6	7	8	9	10	Final
Kate Cameron	1	0	2	0	0	0	2	1	0	1	7
Lisa McLeod	0	1	0	1	1	0	0	0	1	0	4

Sheet C	1	2	3	4	5	6	7	8	9	10	Final
Jolene Campbell	3	0	0	2	1	0	2	X	X	X	8
Tiffany Armstrong	0	0	1	0	0	1	0	X	X	X	2

=== Draw 5 ===
Thursday, January 25, 8:30 am

Sheet A	1	2	3	4	5	6	7	8	9	10	Final
Emma Jensen	0	1	0	0	0	1	0	X	X	X	2
Kaitlyn Lawes	0	0	3	0	1	0	4	X	X	X	8

Sheet B	1	2	3	4	5	6	7	8	9	10	Final
Emily Cherwinski	1	0	2	0	0	1	0	0	0	X	4
Beth Peterson	0	1	0	2	2	0	1	1	2	X	9

Sheet C	1	2	3	4	5	6	7	8	9	10	Final
Shaela Hayward	1	0	1	0	0	2	0	1	0	0	5
Kristy Watling	0	1	0	2	1	0	2	0	2	1	9

=== Draw 6 ===
Thursday, January 25, 12:15 pm

Sheet A	1	2	3	4	5	6	7	8	9	10	Final
Zoey Terrick	0	0	0	0	0	1	X	X	X	X	1
Kate Cameron	1	2	2	1	1	0	X	X	X	X	7

Sheet B	1	2	3	4	5	6	7	8	9	10	Final
Rachel Kaatz	0	0	0	2	0	1	0	0	X	X	3
Jolene Campbell	0	3	2	0	2	0	2	1	X	X	10

Sheet C	1	2	3	4	5	6	7	8	9	10	Final
Tiffany Armstrong	0	0	0	0	0	1	0	1	X	X	2
Lisa McLeod	0	2	2	1	1	0	1	0	X	X	7

=== Draw 7 ===
Thursday, January 25, 4:00 pm

Sheet A	1	2	3	4	5	6	7	8	9	10	Final
Kristy Watling	0	3	0	0	1	0	X	X	X	X	4
Beth Peterson	5	0	0	2	0	3	X	X	X	X	10

Sheet B	1	2	3	4	5	6	7	8	9	10	Final
Emma Jensen	0	0	2	0	1	3	0	0	2	0	8
Shaela Hayward	1	1	0	1	0	0	2	1	0	4	10

Sheet C	1	2	3	4	5	6	7	8	9	10	Final
Kaitlyn Lawes	1	2	0	2	3	4	X	X	X	X	12
Emily Cherwinski	0	0	1	0	0	0	X	X	X	X	1

=== Draw 8 ===
Thursday, January 25, 7:45 pm

Sheet A	1	2	3	4	5	6	7	8	9	10	Final
Lisa McLeod	0	0	1	0	0	2	1	0	0	X	4
Jolene Campbell	2	1	0	1	2	0	0	1	1	X	8

Sheet B	1	2	3	4	5	6	7	8	9	10	Final
Zoey Terrick	2	0	4	0	2	0	1	0	0	X	9
Tiffany Armstrong	0	1	0	2	0	1	0	1	1	X	6

Sheet C	1	2	3	4	5	6	7	8	9	10	Final
Kate Cameron	0	1	2	3	0	3	X	X	X	X	9
Rachel Kaatz	0	0	0	0	1	0	X	X	X	X	1

=== Draw 9 ===
Friday, January 26, 9:00 am

Sheet A	1	2	3	4	5	6	7	8	9	10	Final
Emily Cherwinski	1	0	2	1	0	2	0	0	0	X	6
Shaela Hayward	0	2	0	0	2	0	2	3	1	X	10

Sheet B	1	2	3	4	5	6	7	8	9	10	11	Final
Kaitlyn Lawes	1	0	2	0	0	1	0	0	2	0	2	8
Beth Peterson	0	1	0	1	0	0	1	1	0	2	0	6

Sheet C	1	2	3	4	5	6	7	8	9	10	Final
Kristy Watling	2	0	0	2	1	0	0	1	0	1	7
Emma Jensen	0	1	1	0	0	1	2	0	1	0	6

=== Draw 10 ===
Friday, January 26, 1:00 pm

Sheet A	1	2	3	4	5	6	7	8	9	10	Final
Rachel Kaatz	1	1	0	0	0	0	1	0	0	X	3
Tiffany Armstrong	0	0	1	0	1	2	0	2	3	X	9

Sheet B	1	2	3	4	5	6	7	8	9	10	Final
Kate Cameron	0	3	0	0	0	0	0	1	0	2	6
Jolene Campbell	0	0	1	1	1	0	1	0	1	0	5

Sheet C	1	2	3	4	5	6	7	8	9	10	Final
Lisa McLeod	1	0	1	0	1	0	0	1	0	0	4
Zoey Terrick	0	1	0	2	0	1	1	0	2	1	8

== Championship round standings ==
Final Championship Round Standings

Key
Teams to Playoffs

Skip	W	L
Kaitlyn Lawes	7	1
Beth Peterson	6	2
Kate Cameron	6	2
Kristy Watling	5	3
Jolene Campbell	5	3
Zoey Terrick	3	5

== Championship round results ==
=== Draw 11 ===
Friday, January 26, 6:30 pm

Sheet A	1	2	3	4	5	6	7	8	9	10	Final
Kristy Watling	1	0	0	1	0	0	1	2	0	X	5
Kate Cameron	0	0	1	0	0	4	0	0	2	X	7

Sheet B	1	2	3	4	5	6	7	8	9	10	Final
Kaitlyn Lawes	3	0	1	3	0	2	1	X	X	X	10
Zoey Terrick	0	0	0	0	2	0	0	X	X	X	2

Sheet C	1	2	3	4	5	6	7	8	9	10	Final
Beth Peterson	0	3	0	1	1	1	2	0	X	X	8
Jolene Campbell	1	0	2	0	0	0	0	1	X	X	4

=== Draw 12 ===
Saturday, January 27, 10:00 am

Sheet A	1	2	3	4	5	6	7	8	9	10	Final
Kaitlyn Lawes	0	0	1	0	2	0	1	0	0	1	5
Jolene Campbell	0	2	0	2	0	2	0	1	0	0	7

Sheet B	1	2	3	4	5	6	7	8	9	10	Final
Beth Peterson	0	0	0	0	0	0	2	1	1	1	5
Kate Cameron	0	0	0	1	1	1	0	0	0	0	3

Sheet C	1	2	3	4	5	6	7	8	9	10	Final
Kristy Watling	2	1	0	0	1	1	0	1	0	1	7
Zoey Terrick	0	0	2	1	0	0	2	0	1	0	6

=== Draw 13 ===
Saturday, January 27, 4:00 pm

Sheet A	1	2	3	4	5	6	7	8	9	10	Final
Beth Peterson	0	1	1	2	0	0	3	0	X	X	7
Zoey Terrick	0	0	0	0	1	1	0	1	X	X	3

Sheet B	1	2	3	4	5	6	7	8	9	10	Final
Kristy Watling	1	0	0	4	0	2	0	0	1	X	8
Jolene Campbell	0	0	1	0	2	0	2	1	0	X	6

Sheet C	1	2	3	4	5	6	7	8	9	10	Final
Kaitlyn Lawes	1	0	2	0	0	3	0	2	X	X	8
Kate Cameron	0	2	0	1	0	0	1	0	X	X	4

== Playoffs ==
Semifinal			Final
			1	Kaitlyn Lawes	9
2	Beth Peterson	8	2	Beth Peterson	8
3	Kate Cameron	4

=== Semifinal ===
Sunday, January 28, 9:30 am

Sheet B	1	2	3	4	5	6	7	8	9	10	Final
Beth Peterson	1	1	0	2	0	1	0	0	3	X	8
Kate Cameron	0	0	2	0	1	0	0	1	0	X	4

=== Final ===
Sunday, January 28, 2:00 pm

Sheet B	1	2	3	4	5	6	7	8	9	10	Final
Kaitlyn Lawes	2	0	2	0	2	0	1	0	2	0	9
Beth Peterson	0	1	0	2	0	2	0	2	0	1	8

2024 Manitoba Scotties Tournament of Hearts

Kaitlyn Lawes
5th Manitoba Provincial Championship title
