= 2026 RME Women of the Rings =

Canadian women's provincial curling championship

2026 RME Women of the Rings presented by Case IH
- Host city: Rivers, Manitoba
- Arena: Riverdale Community Centre
- Dates: December 31, 2025 – January 4, 2026
- Winner: Team Peterson
- Curling club: Assiniboine Memorial CC, Winnipeg
- Skip: Kelsey Calvert
- Third: Beth Peterson
- Second: Katherine Remillard
- Lead: Melissa Gordon-Kurz
- Finalist: Team Lawes

The 2026 RME Women of the Rings presented by Case IH, the provincial women's curling championship for Manitoba, was held from December 31, 2025 to January 4, 2026 at the Riverdale Community Centre in Rivers, Manitoba. The winning Beth Peterson rink represented Manitoba at the 2026 Scotties Tournament of Hearts, Canada's national women's curling championship in Mississauga, Ontario.

The Championship Round consisted of two three-team page playoffs. The winners of the 1/2 and 3/4 qualifiers advanced to the Playoff round, which changed to a four-team page playoff. Previously, the Championship Round was a six-team round robin with all results carrying over from pool play with the top three teams in the Championship Round advancing to the Playoff.

== Qualification process ==
Qualification method	Berths	Qualifying team(s)
2025 Manitoba Provincial Champion	1	Kate Cameron
2024–25 CTRS leader	1	Kaitlyn Lawes
2025–26 CTRS leader	1	Darcy Robertson
Berth Bonspiel	2	Beth Peterson; Kristy Watling
MCT Berth 2025	2	Hailey McFarlane; Lisa McLeod
West Qualifier	2	Alyssa Calvert; Cheyenne Ehnes
Winnipeg Qualifier	3	Rachel Kaatz; Lane Prokopowich; Sarah-Jane Sass

== Teams ==
The teams are listed as follows:

Skip	Third	Second	Lead	Alternate	Coach	Club
Alyssa Calvert	Stacey Irwin	Pam Robins	Roz Taylor			Carberry CC, Carberry
Kate Cameron	Briane Harris	Taylor McDonald	Mackenzie Elias		Derek Samagalski	St. Adolphe CC, St. Adolphe
Cheyenne Ehnes	Makenna Hadway	Dayna Lea	Sawyer Elliott	Hannah Thiessen	Jonathan Friesen	Manitou CC, Manitou
Rachel Kaatz	Brianna Cullen	Zoey Terrick	Jaycee Terrick	Jensen Letham	Clinton Cullen	East St. Paul CC, East St. Paul
Kaitlyn Lawes (Fourth)	Selena Njegovan (Skip) (Note: Selena Njegovan skipped Team Lawes.)	Jocelyn Peterman	Kristin Gordon		Marcel Rocque	Heather CC, Winnipeg
Hailey McFarlane	Janelle Lach	Stacy Sime	Hallie McCannell	Emilie Rafnson		Rivers CC, Rivers
Lisa McLeod	Christine Mackay	Emily Cherwinski	Jolene Callum		Lyall Hudson	Pembina CC, Winnipeg
Kelsey Calvert (Note: Kelsey Calvert skipped Team Peterson.)	Beth Peterson	Katherine Remillard	Melissa Gordon-Kurz			Assiniboine Memorial CC, Winnipeg
Lane Prokopowich	Mikaylah Lyburn	Caitlin Kostna	Stephanie Feeleus		William Lyburn	Granite CC, Winnipeg
Darcy Robertson	Rhonda Varnes	Brooklyn Meiklejohn	Kylie Lippens	Erika Campbell	James Kirkness	Heather CC, Winnipeg
Sarah-Jane Sass	Katy Lukowich	Julia Millan	Mackenzie Arbuckle	Danica Metcalfe	Tim Arbuckle	Heather CC, Winnipeg
Kristy Watling	Laura Burtnyk	Emily Deschenes	Sarah Pyke			East St. Paul CC, East St. Paul

== Round robin standings ==
Final Round Robin Standings

Key
Teams to Championship Round

Asham Pool
Skip	W	L	W–L	PF	PA	EW	EL	BE	SE	LSD
Team Lawes	5	0	–	42	17	24	12	3	11	144.90
Kristy Watling	3	2	1–1	44	28	25	18	1	9	186.30
Lisa McLeod	3	2	1–1	37	37	22	26	0	6	308.20
Sarah-Jane Sass	3	2	1–1	33	31	21	18	1	10	429.00
Rachel Kaatz	1	4	–	26	44	16	21	1	4	603.30
Cheyenne Ehnes	0	5	–	19	44	14	27	0	4	423.60

Asham Ultra Force Pool
Skip	W	L	W–L	PF	PA	EW	EL	BE	SE	LSD
Kate Cameron	5	0	–	48	16	26	9	1	14	276.10
Team Peterson	4	1	–	32	19	22	16	4	10	144.80
Lane Prokopowich	2	3	1–0	28	39	17	19	4	4	339.20
Alyssa Calvert	2	3	0–1	33	32	21	20	1	6	266.60
Darcy Robertson	1	4	1–0	21	43	12	25	1	2	355.60
Hailey McFarlane	1	4	0–1	27	40	15	24	1	4	371.60

== Round robin results ==
All draws are listed in Central Time (UTC−06:00).

=== Draw 1 ===
Wednedsday, December 31, 9:00 am

Sheet A	1	2	3	4	5	6	7	8	9	10	Final
Cheyenne Ehnes 🔨	0	0	0	0	1	0	X	X	X	X	1
Team Lawes	1	1	1	3	0	3	X	X	X	X	9

Sheet B	1	2	3	4	5	6	7	8	9	10	11	Final
Lisa McLeod 🔨	1	1	0	0	0	1	0	3	0	0	0	6
Sarah-Jane Sass	0	0	0	1	1	0	1	0	2	1	1	7

Sheet C	1	2	3	4	5	6	7	8	9	10	Final
Kristy Watling 🔨	2	0	4	2	1	5	X	X	X	X	14
Rachel Kaatz	0	1	0	0	0	0	X	X	X	X	1

=== Draw 2 ===
Wednedsday, December 31, 1:00 pm

Sheet A	1	2	3	4	5	6	7	8	9	10	Final
Lane Prokopowich 🔨	2	0	0	2	0	2	0	2	0	0	8
Kate Cameron	0	1	2	0	3	0	2	0	0	2	10

Sheet B	1	2	3	4	5	6	7	8	9	10	Final
Team Peterson 🔨	2	1	0	1	0	2	0	2	X	X	8
Alyssa Calvert	0	0	1	0	1	0	1	0	X	X	3

Sheet C	1	2	3	4	5	6	7	8	9	10	Final
Darcy Robertson 🔨	0	4	0	3	0	0	2	1	0	X	10
Hailey McFarlane	2	0	1	0	2	1	0	0	1	X	7

=== Draw 3 ===
Wednedsday, December 31, 7:00 pm

Sheet A	1	2	3	4	5	6	7	8	9	10	Final
Rachel Kaatz 🔨	1	0	0	2	0	0	X	X	X	X	3
Sarah-Jane Sass	0	2	2	0	3	4	X	X	X	X	11

Sheet B	1	2	3	4	5	6	7	8	9	10	Final
Team Lawes	2	0	2	0	0	2	0	1	0	1	8
Kristy Watling 🔨	0	1	0	3	0	0	1	0	1	0	6

Sheet C	1	2	3	4	5	6	7	8	9	10	Final
Lisa McLeod 🔨	3	0	2	0	2	1	0	2	0	X	10
Cheyenne Ehnes	0	1	0	2	0	0	2	0	1	X	6

=== Draw 4 ===
Thursday, January 1, 9:00 am

Sheet A	1	2	3	4	5	6	7	8	9	10	Final
Hailey McFarlane 🔨	0	0	1	0	0	1	0	0	2	0	4
Alyssa Calvert	1	1	0	2	1	0	1	1	0	1	8

Sheet B	1	2	3	4	5	6	7	8	9	10	Final
Kate Cameron 🔨	1	1	2	4	4	X	X	X	X	X	12
Darcy Robertson	0	0	0	0	0	X	X	X	X	X	0

Sheet C	1	2	3	4	5	6	7	8	9	10	Final
Team Peterson 🔨	0	1	1	0	3	0	1	3	X	X	9
Lane Prokopowich	0	0	0	1	0	0	0	0	X	X	1

=== Draw 5 ===
Thursday, January 1, 1:00 pm

Sheet A	1	2	3	4	5	6	7	8	9	10	Final
Sarah-Jane Sass	0	0	0	0	X	X	X	X	X	X	0
Team Lawes 🔨	0	3	1	2	X	X	X	X	X	X	6

Sheet B	1	2	3	4	5	6	7	8	9	10	Final
Rachel Kaatz 🔨	1	0	1	0	2	2	0	0	0	1	7
Lisa McLeod	0	3	0	1	0	0	2	1	1	0	8

Sheet C	1	2	3	4	5	6	7	8	9	10	Final
Cheyenne Ehnes	1	0	1	0	0	1	0	0	0	X	3
Kristy Watling 🔨	0	3	0	1	1	0	1	1	1	X	8

=== Draw 6 ===
Thursday, January 1, 6:00 pm

Sheet A	1	2	3	4	5	6	7	8	9	10	11	Final
Alyssa Calvert 🔨	1	0	0	0	2	0	0	2	0	1	0	6
Kate Cameron	0	1	0	1	0	2	1	0	1	0	2	8

Sheet B	1	2	3	4	5	6	7	8	9	10	Final
Hailey McFarlane	0	2	0	0	0	0	0	1	1	0	4
Team Peterson 🔨	3	0	0	1	1	1	1	0	0	1	8

Sheet C	1	2	3	4	5	6	7	8	9	10	Final
Lane Prokopowich	0	0	1	1	0	1	3	1	1	X	8
Darcy Robertson 🔨	0	2	0	0	1	0	0	0	0	X	3

=== Draw 7 ===
Friday, January 2, 8:30 am

Sheet A	1	2	3	4	5	6	7	8	9	10	11	Final
Kristy Watling 🔨	0	1	0	0	3	0	1	0	1	1	0	7
Lisa McLeod	0	0	1	3	0	2	0	1	0	0	2	9

Sheet B	1	2	3	4	5	6	7	8	9	10	11	Final
Sarah-Jane Sass 🔨	0	1	2	1	1	1	0	0	1	0	1	8
Cheyenne Ehnes	4	0	0	0	0	0	1	1	0	1	0	7

Sheet C	1	2	3	4	5	6	7	8	9	10	Final
Team Lawes 🔨	1	0	0	2	0	2	0	2	2	X	9
Rachel Kaatz	0	1	1	0	2	0	2	0	0	X	6

=== Draw 8 ===
Friday, January 2, 12:15 pm

Sheet A	1	2	3	4	5	6	7	8	9	10	Final
Darcy Robertson 🔨	0	1	0	0	0	1	0	1	0	1	4
Team Peterson	1	0	1	1	1	0	1	0	0	0	5

Sheet B	1	2	3	4	5	6	7	8	9	10	Final
Alyssa Calvert	0	0	0	1	0	2	0	2	0	0	5
Lane Prokopowich 🔨	0	0	3	0	1	0	1	0	0	3	8

Sheet C	1	2	3	4	5	6	7	8	9	10	Final
Kate Cameron 🔨	2	4	1	1	3	X	X	X	X	X	11
Hailey McFarlane	0	0	0	0	0	X	X	X	X	X	0

=== Draw 9 ===
Friday, January 2, 4:00 pm

Sheet A	1	2	3	4	5	6	7	8	9	10	Final
Rachel Kaatz 🔨	0	2	0	0	3	1	3	X	X	X	9
Cheyenne Ehnes	0	0	1	1	0	0	0	X	X	X	2

Sheet B	1	2	3	4	5	6	7	8	9	10	Final
Team Lawes 🔨	1	0	1	0	0	0	3	2	1	2	10
Lisa McLeod	0	1	0	2	0	1	0	0	0	0	4

Sheet C	1	2	3	4	5	6	7	8	9	10	Final
Kristy Watling 🔨	1	1	0	1	5	0	0	1	0	X	9
Sarah-Jane Sass	0	0	2	0	0	1	2	0	2	X	7

=== Draw 10 ===
Friday, January 2, 7:45 pm

Sheet A	1	2	3	4	5	6	7	8	9	10	Final
Hailey McFarlane 🔨	0	3	1	0	3	0	5	X	X	X	12
Lane Prokopowich	0	0	0	2	0	1	0	X	X	X	3

Sheet B	1	2	3	4	5	6	7	8	9	10	Final
Kate Cameron 🔨	2	0	1	0	1	1	2	X	X	X	7
Team Peterson	0	0	0	2	0	0	0	X	X	X	2

Sheet C	1	2	3	4	5	6	7	8	9	10	Final
Darcy Robertson 🔨	0	0	3	0	1	0	X	X	X	X	4
Alyssa Calvert	2	1	0	5	0	3	X	X	X	X	11

== Championship round ==
Page 1/2 Qualifier
A1 vs. UF2
A1	Team Lawes	8
UF2	Team Peterson	2

Page 3/4 Qualifier
UF2 vs. A3
UF2	Team Peterson	8
A3	Lisa McLeod	2

Qualified for Playoffs
Team Lawes	To 1 vs. 2 Page
Team Peterson	To 3 vs. 4 Page

Page 1/2 Qualifier
UF1 vs. A2
UF1	Kate Cameron	8
A2	Kristy Watling	4

Page 3/4 Qualifier
A2 vs. UF3
A2	Kristy Watling	6
UF3	Lane Prokopowich	7

Qualified for Playoffs
Kate Cameron	To 1 vs. 2 Page
Lane Prokopowich	To 3 vs. 4 Page

=== Page 1/2 Qualifier ===
Saturday, January 3, 10:00 am

Sheet A	1	2	3	4	5	6	7	8	9	10	Final
Kate Cameron 🔨	0	1	0	2	0	3	2	0	X	X	8
Kristy Watling	0	0	2	0	1	0	0	1	X	X	4

Sheet B	1	2	3	4	5	6	7	8	9	10	Final
Team Lawes 🔨	0	0	1	4	0	3	X	X	X	X	8
Team Peterson	0	1	0	0	1	0	X	X	X	X	2

=== Page 3/4 Qualifier ===
Saturday, January 3, 2:30 pm

Sheet A	1	2	3	4	5	6	7	8	9	10	Final
Team Peterson 🔨	2	0	2	0	2	1	1	X	X	X	8
Lisa McLeod	0	1	0	1	0	0	0	X	X	X	2

Sheet B	1	2	3	4	5	6	7	8	9	10	Final
Kristy Watling 🔨	0	0	1	0	1	0	1	2	0	1	6
Lane Prokopowich	1	1	0	2	0	2	0	0	1	0	7

== Playoffs ==
Page playoff system
1	Team Lawes	7
2	Kate Cameron	4
3	Team Peterson	10
4	Lane Prokopowich	1

Semifinal
2	Kate Cameron	7
3	Team Peterson	13

Final
1	Team Lawes	7
3	Team Peterson	9

=== 1 vs. 2 ===
Saturday, January 3, 7:00 pm

Sheet B	1	2	3	4	5	6	7	8	9	10	Final
Team Lawes	0	2	1	1	0	1	0	2	0	X	7
Kate Cameron 🔨	1	0	0	0	1	0	1	0	1	X	4

=== 3 vs. 4 ===
Saturday, January 3, 7:00 pm

Sheet C	1	2	3	4	5	6	7	8	9	10	Final
Team Peterson 🔨	2	1	1	0	1	1	4	X	X	X	10
Lane Prokopowich	0	0	0	1	0	0	0	X	X	X	1

=== Semifinal ===
Sunday, January 4, 9:30 am

Sheet B	1	2	3	4	5	6	7	8	9	10	Final
Kate Cameron 🔨	0	2	0	2	0	0	3	0	0	X	7
Team Peterson	0	0	2	0	2	4	0	3	2	X	13

=== Final ===
Sunday, January 4, 2:00 pm

Sheet B	1	2	3	4	5	6	7	8	9	10	Final
Team Lawes 🔨	0	3	0	1	0	2	0	1	0	0	7
Team Peterson	0	0	3	0	1	0	3	0	1	1	9

2026 RME Women of the Rings

Kelsey Calvert
1st Manitoba Provincial Championship title
