= 2025 RME Women of the Rings =

Canadian women's provincial curling championship

2025 RME Women of the Rings presented by Case IH
- Host city: Pilot Mound, Manitoba
- Arena: Millennium Recreation Complex
- Dates: January 22–26
- Winner: Team Cameron
- Curling club: Heather CC, Winnipeg
- Skip: Kate Cameron
- Third: Taylor McDonald
- Second: Allison Flaxey
- Lead: Mackenzie Elias
- Alternate: Brianna Cullen
- Finalist: Beth Peterson

The 2025 RME Women of the Rings presented by Case IH, the provincial women's curling championship for Manitoba, was held from January 22 to 26 at the Millennium Recreation Complex in Pilot Mound, Manitoba. The winning Kate Cameron rink represented Manitoba at the 2025 Scotties Tournament of Hearts, Canada's national women's curling championship in Thunder Bay, Ontario.

== Qualification process ==
Qualification method	Berths	Qualifying team(s)
2024 Manitoba Scotties Champion	~~1~~	n/a (Note: The defending provincial champions, Team Kaitlyn Lawes received one of the pre-qualification berths for the 2025 Scotties, and therefore do not need to complete in the playdown process. A second spot was allocated to the 2024-25 CTRS leaders in place of the defending provincial champion.)
2023–24 CTRS leader	1	Kate Cameron
2024–25 CTRS leaders	2	Beth Peterson; Lisa McLeod
Berth Bonspiel	1	Lane Prokopowich
MCT Berth 2024	2	Darcy Robertson; Sarah-Jane Sass
West Qualifier	1	Hailey McFarlane
South Qualifier	1	Cheyenne Ehnes
Winnipeg Qualifier	3	Kristy Watling; Cassidy Dundas; Rachel Kaatz
South/West Playoff	1	Alyssa Calvert

== Teams ==
The teams are listed as follows:

Skip	Third	Second	Lead	Alternate	Coach	Club
Alyssa Calvert	Stacey Irwin	Pam Robins	Roslynn Taylor	Jenna Sambrook		Carberry CC, Carberry
Kate Cameron	Taylor McDonald	Allison Flaxey (Note: Allison Flaxey spared for Brianna Cullen who was competing at the 2025 Winter World University Games. Cullen was still listed as the team's alternate, however.)	Mackenzie Elias	Brianna Cullen		Heather CC, Winnipeg
Cassidy Dundas	Lauren Evason	Eryn Czirfusz	Tessa Terrick		Craig Terrick	Heather CC, Winnipeg
Cheyenne Ehnes	Makenna Hadway	Dayne Lea	Sawyer Elliott	Hannah Thiessen	Johnathan Friesen	Manitou CC, Manitou
Rachel Kaatz	Jenna Boisvert	Hailey Beaudry	Breanne Thomson	Gaetanne Gauthier		Assiniboine Memorial CC, Winnipeg
Hailey McFarlane	Janelle Lach	Stacy Sime	Hallie McCannell			Neepawa CC, Neepawa
Lisa McLeod	Christine Mackay	Victoria Beaudry	Jolene Callum	Jennifer Clark-Rouire	Lyall Hudson	Pembina CC, Winnipeg
Beth Peterson	Kelsey Calvert	Katherine Remillard	Melissa Gordon-Kurz	Meghan Walter	Kyle Kurz	Assiniboine Memorial CC, Winnipeg
Lane Prokopowich	Mikaylah Lyburn	Caitlin Kostna	Stephanie Feeleus		William Lyburn	Granite CC, Winnipeg
Darcy Robertson	Rhonda Varnes	Brooklyn Meiklejohn	Kylie Lippens	Erika Campbell	James Kirkness	Assiniboine Memorial CC, Winnipeg
Sarah-Jane Sass	Katy Lukowich	Mackenzie Arbuckle	Julia Millan	Danica Metcalfe	Tim Arbuckle	Granite CC, Winnipeg
Kristy Watling	Laura Burtnyk	Emily Deschenes	Sarah Pyke		Tom Clasper	East St. Paul CC, East St. Paul

== Round robin standings ==
Final Round Robin standings
Last Stone Draw (LSD) Results:

Key
Teams to Championship Round

Asham Pool
Skip	W	L	W–L	PF	PA	EW	EL	BE	SE	LSD
Lisa McLeod	4	1	1–0	36	30	23	21	0	11	397.9
Hailey McFarlane	4	1	0–1	40	33	27	20	3	9	212.0
Kate Cameron	3	2	–	39	27	22	18	5	6	227.2
Sarah-Jane Sass	2	3	1–0	29	35	18	21	2	5	270.7
Rachel Kaatz	2	3	0–1	37	36	17	25	1	3	453.3
Cheyenne Ehnes	0	5	–	28	48	20	22	2	6	826.7

Asham Ultra Force Pool
Skip	W	L	W–L	PF	PA	EW	EL	BE	SE	LSD
Darcy Robertson	4	1	1–0	34	30	21	20	4	7	268.1
Beth Peterson	4	1	0–1	41	27	23	19	3	6	190.1
Kristy Watling	3	2	–	37	26	21	19	4	7	367.3
Alyssa Calvert	2	3	–	29	28	23	17	0	11	278.6
Cassidy Dundas	1	4	1–0	26	40	18	24	1	6	412.0
Lane Prokopowich	1	4	0–1	26	42	17	24	1	1	382.8

== Round robin results ==
All draws are listed in Central Time (UTC−06:00).

=== Draw 1 ===
Wednedsday, January 22, 8:30 am

Sheet A	1	2	3	4	5	6	7	8	9	10	Final
Kate Cameron	0	1	0	5	0	2	0	0	1	X	9
Cheyenne Ehnes	0	0	1	0	1	0	2	1	0	X	5

Sheet B	1	2	3	4	5	6	7	8	9	10	Final
Lisa McLeod	0	0	1	0	2	1	3	0	0	X	7
Hailey McFarlane	0	1	0	1	0	0	0	2	1	X	5

Sheet C	1	2	3	4	5	6	7	8	9	10	Final
Sarah-Jane Sass	0	2	1	0	0	1	2	0	2	X	8
Rachel Kaatz	2	0	0	0	2	0	0	1	0	X	5

=== Draw 2 ===
Wednedsday, January 22, 12:15 pm

Sheet A	1	2	3	4	5	6	7	8	9	10	Final
Beth Peterson	0	0	2	1	0	0	0	1	0	1	5
Alyssa Calvert	0	1	0	0	1	1	0	0	1	0	4

Sheet B	1	2	3	4	5	6	7	8	9	10	11	Final
Kristy Watling	0	3	0	0	0	0	0	2	1	0	1	7
Cassidy Dundas	1	0	1	0	1	2	0	0	0	1	0	6

Sheet C	1	2	3	4	5	6	7	8	9	10	Final
Darcy Robertson	0	2	0	1	0	2	2	0	0	X	7
Lane Prokopowich	1	0	1	0	1	0	0	1	1	X	5

=== Draw 3 ===
Wednesday, January 22, 4:00 pm

Sheet A	1	2	3	4	5	6	7	8	9	10	11	Final
Rachel Kaatz	0	2	0	0	3	0	0	0	0	2	0	7
Hailey McFarlane	1	0	1	1	0	1	1	1	1	0	1	8

Sheet B	1	2	3	4	5	6	7	8	9	10	Final
Kate Cameron	0	0	0	2	1	0	2	1	3	X	9
Sarah-Jane Sass	0	0	0	0	0	2	0	0	0	X	2

Sheet C	1	2	3	4	5	6	7	8	9	10	Final
Lisa McLeod	0	3	2	1	0	0	4	1	X	X	11
Cheyenne Ehnes	2	0	0	0	1	1	0	0	X	X	4

=== Draw 4 ===
Wednesday, January 22, 8:00 pm

Sheet A	1	2	3	4	5	6	7	8	9	10	Final
Lane Prokopowich	0	3	0	0	2	0	0	1	0	1	7
Cassidy Dundas	1	0	1	2	0	1	3	0	1	0	9

Sheet B	1	2	3	4	5	6	7	8	9	10	Final
Beth Peterson	0	4	0	0	1	3	0	1	0	0	9
Darcy Robertson	0	0	3	1	0	0	2	0	3	1	10

Sheet C	1	2	3	4	5	6	7	8	9	10	Final
Kristy Watling	0	3	1	1	0	1	3	X	X	X	9
Alyssa Calvert	0	0	0	0	1	0	0	X	X	X	1

=== Draw 5 ===
Thursday, January 23, 8:30 am

Sheet A	1	2	3	4	5	6	7	8	9	10	Final
Kate Cameron	0	2	0	1	0	0	1	0	1	0	5
Hailey McFarlane	0	0	1	0	1	1	0	4	0	2	9

Sheet B	1	2	3	4	5	6	7	8	9	10	Final
Lisa McLeod	1	0	1	0	0	2	0	0	0	X	4
Rachel Kaatz	0	2	0	1	1	0	1	2	3	X	10

Sheet C	1	2	3	4	5	6	7	8	9	10	Final
Sarah-Jane Sass	2	0	0	1	3	0	1	0	1	X	8
Cheyenne Ehnes	0	0	1	0	0	2	0	2	0	X	5

=== Draw 6 ===
Thursday, January 23, 12:15 pm

Sheet A	1	2	3	4	5	6	7	8	9	10	Final
Beth Peterson	1	0	1	0	0	1	1	1	4	X	9
Cassidy Dundas	0	2	0	1	2	0	0	0	0	X	5

Sheet B	1	2	3	4	5	6	7	8	9	10	Final
Kristy Watling	0	2	4	2	0	3	X	X	X	X	11
Lane Prokopowich	1	0	0	0	1	0	X	X	X	X	2

Sheet C	1	2	3	4	5	6	7	8	9	10	Final
Darcy Robertson	0	1	0	0	0	0	0	1	0	X	2
Alyssa Calvert	1	0	1	1	2	0	1	0	2	X	8

=== Draw 7 ===
Thursday, January 23, 4:00 pm

Sheet A	1	2	3	4	5	6	7	8	9	10	Final
Sarah-Jane Sass	0	0	2	1	0	0	0	1	0	0	4
Lisa McLeod	0	0	0	0	1	1	1	0	2	1	6

Sheet B	1	2	3	4	5	6	7	8	9	10	Final
Hailey McFarlane	1	1	0	1	0	0	4	0	0	1	8
Cheyenne Ehnes	0	0	2	0	1	1	0	2	1	0	7

Sheet C	1	2	3	4	5	6	7	8	9	10	Final
Kate Cameron	3	0	2	0	2	2	X	X	X	X	9
Rachel Kaatz	0	2	0	1	0	0	X	X	X	X	3

=== Draw 8 ===
Thursday, January 23, 7:45 pm

Sheet A	1	2	3	4	5	6	7	8	9	10	Final
Kristy Watling	0	0	1	0	0	0	1	0	2	0	4
Darcy Robertson	1	1	0	1	1	0	0	1	0	2	7

Sheet B	1	2	3	4	5	6	7	8	9	10	Final
Cassidy Dundas	0	0	1	0	1	0	0	0	0	X	2
Alyssa Calvert	0	1	0	2	0	1	1	1	3	X	9

Sheet C	1	2	3	4	5	6	7	8	9	10	Final
Beth Peterson	4	0	1	0	2	0	1	X	X	X	8
Lane Prokopowich	0	1	0	0	0	1	0	X	X	X	2

=== Draw 9 ===
Friday, January 24, 9:00 am

Sheet A	1	2	3	4	5	6	7	8	9	10	Final
Rachel Kaatz	0	0	6	0	2	0	0	0	4	X	12
Cheyenne Ehnes	0	1	0	1	0	1	1	3	0	X	7

Sheet B	1	2	3	4	5	6	7	8	9	10	11	Final
Kate Cameron	2	0	2	1	0	0	1	0	0	1	0	7
Lisa McLeod	0	1	0	0	2	1	0	1	2	0	1	8

Sheet C	1	2	3	4	5	6	7	8	9	10	11	Final
Sarah-Jane Sass	2	0	0	3	1	0	1	0	0	0	0	7
Hailey McFarlane	0	0	1	0	0	2	0	0	3	1	3	10

=== Draw 10 ===
Friday, January 24, 1:00 pm

Sheet A	1	2	3	4	5	6	7	8	9	10	Final
Lane Prokopowich	0	2	0	0	5	0	0	2	0	1	10
Alyssa Calvert	2	0	1	1	0	1	1	0	1	0	7

Sheet B	1	2	3	4	5	6	7	8	9	10	Final
Beth Peterson	2	0	2	0	1	0	2	0	0	3	10
Kristy Watling	0	1	0	1	0	2	0	1	1	0	6

Sheet C	1	2	3	4	5	6	7	8	9	10	Final
Darcy Robertson	0	0	0	0	3	1	2	0	2	X	8
Cassidy Dundas	0	0	0	2	0	0	0	2	0	X	4

== Championship round standings ==
Round robin results are carried over to Championship Round

Final Championship Round Standings
Last Stone Draw (LSD) Results:

Key
Teams to Playoffs
Teams to Tiebreaker

Skip	W	L	W–L	LSD
Kate Cameron	6	2	1–0	461.2
Darcy Robertson	6	2	0–1	691.1
Hailey McFarlane	5	3	1–1	400.3
Beth Peterson	5	3	1–1	440.6
Kristy Watling	5	3	1–1	619.7
Lisa McLeod	4	4	–	624.5

== Championship round results ==
=== Draw 11 ===
Friday, January 24, 6:30 pm

Sheet A	1	2	3	4	5	6	7	8	9	10	Final
Darcy Robertson	1	0	0	1	1	0	0	2	0	1	6
Kate Cameron	0	2	0	0	0	2	2	0	2	0	8

Sheet B	1	2	3	4	5	6	7	8	9	10	Final
Kristy Watling	0	3	1	0	1	1	0	0	2	0	8
Lisa McLeod	2	0	0	1	0	0	0	3	0	1	7

Sheet C	1	2	3	4	5	6	7	8	9	10	Final
Beth Peterson	1	0	2	0	0	3	0	0	2	0	8
Hailey McFarlane	0	1	0	2	3	0	1	1	0	1	9

=== Draw 12 ===
Saturday, January 25, 10:00 am

Sheet A	1	2	3	4	5	6	7	8	9	10	Final
Beth Peterson	0	1	1	1	0	1	1	1	0	0	6
Lisa McLeod	1	0	0	0	1	0	0	0	1	2	5

Sheet B	1	2	3	4	5	6	7	8	9	10	Final
Darcy Robertson	0	0	1	0	1	0	2	0	0	2	6
Hailey McFarlane	0	1	0	1	0	1	0	2	0	0	5

Sheet C	1	2	3	4	5	6	7	8	9	10	Final
Kristy Watling	0	2	0	0	0	1	0	0	2	0	5
Kate Cameron	2	0	0	1	1	0	0	2	0	1	7

=== Draw 13 ===
Saturday, January 25, 4:00 pm

Sheet A	1	2	3	4	5	6	7	8	9	10	Final
Kristy Watling	1	0	0	2	2	0	1	1	1	X	8
Hailey McFarlane	0	2	1	0	0	2	0	0	0	X	5

Sheet B	1	2	3	4	5	6	7	8	9	10	Final
Beth Peterson	1	0	1	0	1	0	0	2	1	0	6
Kate Cameron	0	1	0	1	0	2	2	0	0	1	7

Sheet C	1	2	3	4	5	6	7	8	9	10	Final
Darcy Robertson	0	3	1	2	4	0	X	X	X	X	10
Lisa McLeod	1	0	0	0	0	2	X	X	X	X	3

== Tiebreaker ==
Saturday, January 25, 8:00 pm

Sheet B	1	2	3	4	5	6	7	8	9	10	Final
Hailey McFarlane	0	2	0	1	0	0	0	0	2	0	5
Beth Peterson	1	0	1	0	1	0	2	1	0	1	7

== Playoffs ==
Semifinal			Final
			1	Kate Cameron	7
2	Darcy Robertson	1	3	Beth Peterson	6
3	Beth Peterson	9

=== Semifinal ===
Sunday, January 26, 9:30 am

Sheet B	1	2	3	4	5	6	7	8	9	10	Final
Darcy Robertson	0	1	0	0	0	0	X	X	X	X	1
Beth Peterson	2	0	2	2	2	1	X	X	X	X	9

=== Final ===
Sunday, January 26, 2:00 pm

Sheet B	1	2	3	4	5	6	7	8	9	10	Final
Kate Cameron	1	0	1	1	0	0	1	2	0	1	7
Beth Peterson	0	1	0	0	3	0	0	0	2	0	6

2025 RME Women of the Rings

Kate Cameron
2nd Manitoba Provincial Championship title
