= 2020 Manitoba Scotties Tournament of Hearts =

2020 Manitoba Scotties Tournament of Hearts presented by Bayer
- Host city: Rivers, Manitoba
- Arena: Riverdale Community Centre
- Dates: January 29 – February 2
- Winner: Team Einarson
- Curling club: Gimli CC, Gimli
- Skip: Kerri Einarson
- Third: Val Sweeting
- Second: Shannon Birchard
- Lead: Briane Meilleur
- Coach: Patti Wuthrich
- Finalist: Jennifer Jones

The 2020 Manitoba Scotties Tournament of Hearts presented by Bayer, the provincial women's curling championship for Manitoba, was held from January 29 – February 2 at the Riverdale Community Centre in Rivers, Manitoba. The winning Kerri Einarson rink represented Manitoba at the 2020 Scotties Tournament of Hearts in Moose Jaw, Saskatchewan and won the championship title.

== Qualification process ==
Qualification	Berths	Qualifying team(s)
Defending champion	1	Tracy Fleury
2018–19 CTRS leader	1	Kerri Einarson
Berth Bonspiel	1	Kristy Watling
2019–20 CTRS leader	1	Jennifer Jones
MCT Berth	1	Abby Ackland
North Qualifier	1	Jennifer Briscoe
West Qualifier	2	Janelle Vachon; Terry Ursel
South Qualifier	1	Jennifer Clark-Rouire
Winnipeg Qualifier	2	Beth Peterson; Theresa Cannon
Last Chance Qualifier	1	Darcy Robertson

== Teams ==
The teams are listed as follows:

Skip	Third	Second	Lead	Alternate	Club
Hailey Ryan (Note: Abby Ackland could not play due to pregnancy)	Emilie Rafnson	Sara Oliver	Robyn Njegovan		Assiniboine Memorial Curling Club
Jennifer Briscoe	Sherri Horning	Courtney Reeves	Brooke Graham		Burntwood Curling Club
Theresa Cannon	Karen Klein	Vanessa Foster	Raunora Westcott		East St. Paul Curling Club
Jennifer Clark-Rouire	Lisa McLeod	Jolene Callum	Rachel Burtnyk		Miami Curling Club
Kerri Einarson	Val Sweeting	Shannon Birchard	Briane Meilleur		Gimli Curling Club
Tracy Fleury	Selena Njegovan	Liz Fyfe	Kristin MacCuish		East St. Paul Curling Club
Jennifer Jones	Kaitlyn Lawes	Jocelyn Peterman	Dawn McEwen		St. Vital Curling Club
Beth Peterson	Jenna Loder	Katherine Doerksen	Melissa Gordon	Meghan Walter	Assiniboine Memorial Curling Club
Darcy Robertson	Laura Burtnyk	Gaetanne Gauthier	Krysten Karwacki		Assiniboine Memorial Curling Club
Terry Ursel	Wanda Rainka	Brenda Walker	Tracy Igonia	Kayla Hunter	Arden Curling Club
Janelle Vachon	Dori Vince	Megan Huculak	Hayley Survoy		Brandon Curling Club
Kristy Watling	Christine MacKay	Taylor Maida	Katrina Thiessen	Kyla Grabowski	Fort Rouge Curling Club

== Round-robin standings ==
Final round-robin standings

Key
Teams to Championship Round

Asham Black Group	W	L
Tracy Fleury	5	0
Kristy Watling	4	1
Beth Peterson	2	3
Theresa Cannon	2	3
Jennifer Briscoe	1	4
Jennifer Clark-Rouire	1	4

Asham Express Red Group	W	L
Kerri Einarson	4	1
Jennifer Jones	4	1
Darcy Robertson	3	2
Team Ackland	3	2
Janelle Vachon	1	4
Terry Ursel	0	5

== Round-robin results ==
All draws are listed in Central Time (UTC−06:00).

=== Draw 1 ===
Wednesday, January 29, 9:30 am

Sheet A	1	2	3	4	5	6	7	8	9	10	Final
Beth Peterson	0	1	1	2	1	0	1	0	0	2	8
Jennifer Briscoe	2	0	0	0	0	1	0	2	0	0	5

Sheet B	1	2	3	4	5	6	7	8	9	10	Final
Jennifer Clark-Rouire	0	2	0	0	1	0	1	0	3	0	7
Theresa Cannon	1	0	2	2	0	1	0	1	0	1	8

Sheet C	1	2	3	4	5	6	7	8	9	10	Final
Kristy Watling	1	0	2	1	0	0	0	0	0	X	4
Tracy Fleury	0	1	0	0	2	2	1	1	1	X	8

=== Draw 2 ===
Wednesday, January 29, 2:00 pm

Sheet A	1	2	3	4	5	6	7	8	9	10	Final
Jennifer Jones	2	0	2	0	1	1	4	1	X	X	11
Terry Ursel	0	1	0	1	0	0	0	0	X	X	2

Sheet B	1	2	3	4	5	6	7	8	9	10	Final
Janelle Vachon	0	2	0	0	0	0	0	1	0	X	3
Darcy Robertson	0	0	1	1	3	1	1	0	4	X	11

Sheet C	1	2	3	4	5	6	7	8	9	10	Final
Team Ackland	0	0	1	0	2	0	1	0	1	1	6
Kerri Einarson	0	1	0	1	0	2	0	1	0	0	5

=== Draw 3 ===
Wednesday, January 29, 7:15 pm

Sheet A	1	2	3	4	5	6	7	8	9	10	Final
Kristy Watling	0	1	0	4	1	1	0	2	X	X	9
Jennifer Clark-Rouire	1	0	2	0	0	0	1	0	X	X	4

Sheet B	1	2	3	4	5	6	7	8	9	10	Final
Jennifer Briscoe	0	0	1	0	2	0	X	X	X	X	3
Tracy Fleury	4	3	0	1	0	1	X	X	X	X	9

Sheet C	1	2	3	4	5	6	7	8	9	10	Final
Beth Peterson	3	2	2	2	0	2	X	X	X	X	11
Theresa Cannon	0	0	0	0	2	0	X	X	X	X	2

=== Draw 4 ===
Thursday, January 30, 9:30 am

Sheet A	1	2	3	4	5	6	7	8	9	10	Final
Team Ackland	0	0	2	0	1	0	0	1	0	1	5
Janelle Vachon	0	0	0	2	0	1	0	0	1	0	4

Sheet B	1	2	3	4	5	6	7	8	9	10	Final
Terry Ursel	0	1	0	0	1	0	1	1	0	X	4
Kerri Einarson	2	0	3	1	0	2	0	0	3	X	11

Sheet C	1	2	3	4	5	6	7	8	9	10	Final
Jennifer Jones	0	1	4	0	2	1	0	4	X	X	12
Darcy Robertson	1	0	0	2	0	0	1	0	X	X	4

=== Draw 5 ===
Thursday, January 30, 2:00 pm

Sheet A	1	2	3	4	5	6	7	8	9	10	Final
Theresa Cannon	0	2	0	1	0	0	X	X	X	X	3
Tracy Fleury	1	0	4	0	2	4	X	X	X	X	11

Sheet B	1	2	3	4	5	6	7	8	9	10	Final
Beth Peterson	0	0	2	1	0	1	0	1	0	X	5
Jennifer Clark-Rouire	0	2	0	0	1	0	2	0	3	X	8

Sheet C	1	2	3	4	5	6	7	8	9	10	Final
Kristy Watling	2	0	4	2	0	3	X	X	X	X	11
Jennifer Briscoe	0	1	0	0	2	0	X	X	X	X	3

=== Draw 6 ===
Thursday, January 30, 7:00 pm

Sheet A	1	2	3	4	5	6	7	8	9	10	Final
Darcy Robertson	1	0	1	0	0	0	0	1	0	X	3
Kerri Einarson	0	2	0	3	0	0	1	0	2	X	8

Sheet B	1	2	3	4	5	6	7	8	9	10	Final
Jennifer Jones	1	0	1	2	2	0	3	0	2	X	11
Janelle Vachon	0	2	0	0	0	1	0	2	0	X	5

Sheet C	1	2	3	4	5	6	7	8	9	10	Final
Team Ackland	0	0	1	2	1	0	0	1	0	2	7
Terry Ursel	2	1	0	0	0	1	0	0	2	0	6

=== Draw 7 ===
Friday, January 31, 8:30 am

Sheet A	1	2	3	4	5	6	7	8	9	10	Final
Theresa Cannon	1	3	1	2	2	X	X	X	X	X	9
Jennifer Briscoe	0	0	0	0	0	X	X	X	X	X	0

Sheet B	1	2	3	4	5	6	7	8	9	10	Final
Kristy Watling	0	0	2	1	0	0	2	2	X	X	7
Beth Peterson	0	1	0	0	0	1	0	0	X	X	2

Sheet C	1	2	3	4	5	6	7	8	9	10	Final
Tracy Fleury	1	2	0	1	0	2	1	4	X	X	11
Jennifer Clark-Rouire	0	0	2	0	2	0	0	0	X	X	4

=== Draw 8 ===
Friday, January 31, 12:15 pm

Sheet A	1	2	3	4	5	6	7	8	9	10	Final
Darcy Robertson	1	0	1	2	0	0	1	4	X	X	9
Terry Ursel	0	1	0	0	1	0	0	0	X	X	2

Sheet B	1	2	3	4	5	6	7	8	9	10	Final
Team Ackland	1	0	1	0	0	1	0	X	X	X	3
Jennifer Jones	0	2	0	0	6	0	3	X	X	X	11

Sheet C	1	2	3	4	5	6	7	8	9	10	Final
Kerri Einarson	3	0	0	2	0	0	0	1	0	X	6
Janelle Vachon	0	1	0	0	0	1	0	0	1	X	3

=== Draw 9 ===
Friday, January 31, 4:00 pm

Sheet A	1	2	3	4	5	6	7	8	9	10	Final
Beth Peterson	0	0	2	0	1	0	0	0	2	0	5
Tracy Fleury	0	2	0	1	0	2	1	1	0	1	8

Sheet B	1	2	3	4	5	6	7	8	9	10	Final
Jennifer Clark-Rouire	0	2	0	1	0	2	0	2	1	X	8
Jennifer Briscoe	3	0	2	0	2	0	4	0	0	X	11

Sheet C	1	2	3	4	5	6	7	8	9	10	Final
Theresa Cannon	0	0	1	0	1	0	1	1	0	1	5
Kristy Watling	0	1	0	2	0	1	0	0	2	0	6

=== Draw 10 ===
Friday, January 31, 7:45 pm

Sheet A	1	2	3	4	5	6	7	8	9	10	11	Final
Jennifer Jones	0	0	2	0	0	0	0	2	0	2	0	6
Kerri Einarson	1	0	0	1	0	2	1	0	1	0	1	7

Sheet B	1	2	3	4	5	6	7	8	9	10	Final
Janelle Vachon	0	1	0	0	2	0	0	0	3	2	8
Terry Ursel	1	0	1	1	0	2	1	1	0	0	7

Sheet C	1	2	3	4	5	6	7	8	9	10	Final
Darcy Robertson	0	2	0	1	0	2	0	4	0	X	9
Team Ackland	1	0	0	0	1	0	1	0	2	X	5

== Championship Round ==
=== Standings ===
Final Championship Round Standings

Key
Teams to Playoffs

Skip	W	L
Kerri Einarson	6	1
Tracy Fleury	6	1
Jennifer Jones	5	2
Kristy Watling	4	3

=== Results ===
==== Draw 11 ====
Saturday, February 1, 1:30 pm

Sheet A	1	2	3	4	5	6	7	8	9	10	Final
Kristy Watling	0	0	0	0	0	1	0	X	X	X	1
Kerri Einarson	0	0	2	3	2	0	0	X	X	X	7

Sheet B	1	2	3	4	5	6	7	8	9	10	Final
Tracy Fleury	1	1	1	0	0	2	0	2	0	X	7
Jennifer Jones	0	0	0	1	0	0	2	0	1	X	4

==== Draw 12 ====
Saturday, February 1, 6:00 pm

Sheet A	1	2	3	4	5	6	7	8	9	10	Final
Kristy Watling	2	0	1	0	1	0	0	1	0	X	5
Jennifer Jones	0	1	0	2	0	3	1	0	1	X	8

Sheet B	1	2	3	4	5	6	7	8	9	10	Final
Tracy Fleury	0	1	0	0	1	0	2	0	2	0	6
Kerri Einarson	1	0	3	1	0	1	0	1	0	1	8

== Playoffs ==
Semifinal			Final
			1	Kerri Einarson	8
2	Tracy Fleury	7	3	Jennifer Jones	6
3	Jennifer Jones	8

=== Semifinal ===
Sunday, February 2, 9:00 am

Sheet B	1	2	3	4	5	6	7	8	9	10	11	Final
Tracy Fleury	0	1	0	2	0	1	0	1	0	2	0	7
Jennifer Jones	0	0	1	0	3	0	1	0	2	0	1	8

Player percentages
Team Fleury		Team Jones	
Kristin MacCuish	91%	Dawn McEwen	94%
Liz Fyfe	80%	Jocelyn Peterman	82%
Selena Njegovan	77%	Kaitlyn Lawes	82%
Tracy Fleury	76%	Jennifer Jones	75%
Total	81%	Total	84%

=== Final ===
Sunday, February 2, 4:00 pm

Sheet B	1	2	3	4	5	6	7	8	9	10	Final
Kerri Einarson	0	1	0	1	3	0	0	0	2	1	8
Jennifer Jones	2	0	1	0	0	1	2	0	0	0	6

Player percentages
Team Einarson		Team Jones	
Briane Meilleur	86%	Dawn McEwen	86%
Shannon Birchard	59%	Jocelyn Peterman	81%
Val Sweeting	65%	Kaitlyn Lawes	74%
Kerri Einarson	65%	Jennifer Jones	68%
Total	69%	Total	77%

2020 Manitoba Scotties Tournament of Hearts

Kerri Einarson
3rd Manitoba Provincial Championship title
