= 2023 Manitoba Scotties Tournament of Hearts =

Canadian women's provincial curling championship

2023 Manitoba Scotties Tournament of Hearts presented by RME
- Host city: East St. Paul, Manitoba
- Arena: East St. Paul Arena
- Dates: January 25–29
- Winner: Team Jones
- Curling club: St. Vital CC, Winnipeg & Altona CC, Altona
- Skip: Jennifer Jones
- Third: Karlee Burgess
- Second: Mackenzie Zacharias
- Lead: Emily Zacharias
- Alternate: Lauren Lenentine
- Coach: Glenn Howard
- Finalist: Team Ackland

The 2023 Manitoba Scotties Tournament of Hearts presented by RME, the provincial women's curling championship for Manitoba, was held from January 25 to 29 at East St. Paul Arena in East St. Paul, Manitoba.

The winning Jennifer Jones represented Manitoba at the 2023 Scotties Tournament of Hearts, Canada's national women's curling championship in Kamloops, British Columbia where they finished runner-up overall losing in the final to Team Canada 10–4.

Additionally, two other rinks qualified for the Scotties as wild card teams based on CTRS standings. The Kaitlyn Lawes rink was the Wild Card #1 representative while the Abby Ackland rink (skipped by Meghan Walter) was the Wild Card #3 representative. The Lawes rink would finish tied for second (seeded fifth) in Pool A with a 5–3 record and would lose their tiebreaker game to Nova Scotia 7–6 in an extra end. The Ackland rink finished fifth in Pool B with a 3–5 record.

== Qualification process ==
Qualification method	Berths	Qualifying team(s)
2022 Manitoba Scotties Champion	1	Jennifer Jones (Note: The defending champions, Team Mackenzie Zacharias, became Team Jennifer Jones after Jones joined the team as the new skip.)
2021-22 CTRS leader	1	Kristy Watling
2022-23 CTRS leader	1	Kaitlyn Lawes
Berth Bonspiel	1	Beth Peterson
MCT Berth 2022	2	Abby Ackland; Lisa McLeod
West Qualifier	1	Alyssa Calvert
Winnipeg Qualifier	5	Grace Beaudry; Chelsea Carey; Emma Jensen; Katy Lukowich; Darcy Robertson

== Teams ==
The teams are listed as follows:

Skip	Third	Second	Lead	Alternate	Club
Meghan Walter	Abby Ackland	Sara Oliver	Mackenzie Elias	Kaitlyn Jones	East St. Paul CC, East St. Paul
Grace Beaudry	Emily Ogg	Madelyn Hollins	Mackenzie Arbuckle	Shaela Hayward	St. Vital CC, Winnipeg
Alyssa Calvert	Stacey Irwin	Pam Robins	Roz Taylor		Carberry CC, Carberry
Chelsea Carey	Jolene Campbell	Liz Fyfe	Rachel Erickson		East St. Paul CC, East St. Paul
Emma Jensen	Lane Prokopowich	Becky Friesen	Julia Millan	Katie McKenzie	Heather CC, Winnipeg
Jennifer Jones	Karlee Burgess	Mackenzie Zacharias	Emily Zacharias	Lauren Lenentine	St. Vital CC, Winnipeg; Altona CC, Altona
Kaitlyn Lawes	Jocelyn Peterman	Jill Officer (Note: Jill Officer spared for Selena Njegovan who was on maternity leave.)	Kristin MacCuish	Selena Njegovan	Fort Rouge CC, Winnipeg
Katy Lukowich	Lauren Rajala	Mikaylah Lyburn	Makenna Hadway		Granite CC, Winnipeg
Lisa McLeod	Janelle Lach	Hallie McCannell	Jolene Callum	Sarah-Jane Sass	Portage CC, Portage la Prairie
Beth Peterson	Jenna Loder	Katherine Doerksen	Melissa Gordon	Robyn Njegovan	Assiniboine Memorial CC, Winnipeg
Darcy Robertson	Gaetanne Gauthier	Rachel Kaatz	Kadriana Lott	Jennifer Clark-Rouire	Assiniboine Memorial CC, Winnipeg
Kristy Watling	Laura Burtnyk	Emilie Rafnson	Sarah Pyke		East St. Paul CC, East St. Paul

== Round-robin standings ==
Final round-robin standings

Key
Teams to Championship Round

Asham Black Group
Skip	W	L	PF	PA	EW	EL	BE	SE
Kaitlyn Lawes	5	0	44	16	24	13	0	11
Beth Peterson	4	1	34	26	21	16	2	8
Darcy Robertson	2	3	31	36	21	22	1	8
Katy Lukowich	2	3	31	29	20	19	3	7
Emma Jensen	1	4	22	45	16	23	1	5
Chelsea Carey	1	4	30	40	18	27	2	4

Asham Express Red Group
Skip	W	L	PF	PA	EW	EL	BE	SE
Jennifer Jones	5	0	48	22	26	15	3	9
Lisa McLeod	3	2	37	39	20	21	4	6
Team Ackland	3	2	44	29	20	20	2	5
Grace Beaudry	2	3	25	42	17	24	1	4
Alyssa Calvert	1	4	25	36	18	20	1	6
Kristy Watling	1	4	26	37	15	16	0	5

== Round-robin results ==
All draws are listed in Central Time (UTC−06:00).

=== Draw 1 ===
Wednesday, January 25, 8:30 am

Sheet A	1	2	3	4	5	6	7	8	9	10	Final
Kaitlyn Lawes 🔨	1	3	2	2	2	X	X	X	X	X	10
Emma Jensen	0	0	0	0	0	X	X	X	X	X	0

Sheet B	1	2	3	4	5	6	7	8	9	10	Final
Chelsea Carey 🔨	0	2	0	1	0	1	0	0	0	0	4
Katy Lukowich	0	0	1	0	1	0	1	2	1	1	7

Sheet C	1	2	3	4	5	6	7	8	9	10	Final
Beth Peterson 🔨	0	0	1	0	1	0	2	0	2	1	7
Darcy Robertson	1	0	0	0	0	3	0	1	0	0	5

=== Draw 2 ===
Wednesday, January 25, 12:15 pm

Sheet A	1	2	3	4	5	6	7	8	9	10	Final
Jennifer Jones 🔨	1	0	1	1	0	3	1	0	4	X	11
Grace Beaudry	0	1	0	0	1	0	0	1	0	X	3

Sheet B	1	2	3	4	5	6	7	8	9	10	Final
Team Ackland 🔨	0	2	0	2	0	2	0	2	2	X	10
Alyssa Calvert	0	0	2	0	1	0	1	0	0	X	4

Sheet C	1	2	3	4	5	6	7	8	9	10	Final
Kristy Watling	0	0	3	1	0	3	0	1	0	X	8
Lisa McLeod 🔨	0	5	0	0	3	0	3	0	1	X	12

=== Draw 3 ===
Wednesday, January 25, 4:00 pm

Sheet A	1	2	3	4	5	6	7	8	9	10	Final
Darcy Robertson	0	1	1	0	2	0	1	0	1	X	6
Katy Lukowich 🔨	2	0	0	0	0	0	0	2	0	X	4

Sheet B	1	2	3	4	5	6	7	8	9	10	Final
Kaitlyn Lawes	0	3	0	2	1	2	1	X	X	X	9
Beth Peterson 🔨	1	0	1	0	0	0	0	X	X	X	2

Sheet C	1	2	3	4	5	6	7	8	9	10	11	Final
Chelsea Carey	2	0	2	0	0	1	0	0	3	0	0	8
Emma Jensen 🔨	0	2	0	1	1	0	1	2	0	1	1	9

=== Draw 4 ===
Wednesday, January 25, 8:00 pm

Sheet A	1	2	3	4	5	6	7	8	9	10	Final
Lisa McLeod	0	0	0	0	1	0	0	3	1	1	6
Alyssa Calvert 🔨	2	1	0	0	0	1	1	0	0	0	5

Sheet B	1	2	3	4	5	6	7	8	9	10	Final
Jennifer Jones 🔨	2	0	0	2	0	1	0	2	0	1	8
Kristy Watling	0	1	0	0	1	0	3	0	2	0	7

Sheet C	1	2	3	4	5	6	7	8	9	10	Final
Team Ackland 🔨	2	0	0	2	0	2	2	2	X	X	10
Grace Beaudry	0	1	1	0	1	0	0	0	X	X	3

=== Draw 5 ===
Thursday, January 26, 8:30 am

Sheet A	1	2	3	4	5	6	7	8	9	10	Final
Kaitlyn Lawes 🔨	3	0	2	0	2	1	0	0	X	X	8
Katy Lukowich	0	1	0	1	0	0	1	1	X	X	4

Sheet B	1	2	3	4	5	6	7	8	9	10	Final
Chelsea Carey 🔨	2	2	1	0	1	0	0	1	3	X	10
Darcy Robertson	0	0	0	2	0	2	1	0	0	X	5

Sheet C	1	2	3	4	5	6	7	8	9	10	Final
Beth Peterson 🔨	2	0	2	1	0	0	3	X	X	X	8
Emma Jensen	0	1	0	0	0	1	0	X	X	X	2

=== Draw 6 ===
Thursday, January 26, 12:15 pm

Sheet A	1	2	3	4	5	6	7	8	9	10	Final
Jennifer Jones 🔨	1	0	1	1	0	0	2	6	X	X	11
Alyssa Calvert	0	1	0	0	1	1	0	0	X	X	3

Sheet B	1	2	3	4	5	6	7	8	9	10	Final
Team Ackland	0	1	0	3	0	0	2	0	0	2	8
Lisa McLeod 🔨	2	0	1	0	2	1	0	1	2	0	9

Sheet C	1	2	3	4	5	6	7	8	9	10	Final
Kristy Watling 🔨	2	2	1	2	0	0	X	X	X	X	7
Grace Beaudry	0	0	0	0	0	1	X	X	X	X	1

=== Draw 7 ===
Thursday, January 26, 4:00 pm

Sheet A	1	2	3	4	5	6	7	8	9	10	Final
Chelsea Carey 🔨	3	0	0	0	0	1	0	0	X	X	4
Beth Peterson	0	1	1	3	1	0	3	1	X	X	10

Sheet B	1	2	3	4	5	6	7	8	9	10	Final
Katy Lukowich 🔨	1	3	0	0	2	0	4	X	X	X	10
Emma Jensen	0	0	1	2	0	1	0	X	X	X	4

Sheet C	1	2	3	4	5	6	7	8	9	10	Final
Kaitlyn Lawes 🔨	1	1	0	2	0	3	0	1	0	X	8
Darcy Robertson	0	0	2	0	2	0	1	0	1	X	6

=== Draw 8 ===
Thursday, January 26, 7:45 pm

Sheet A	1	2	3	4	5	6	7	8	9	10	Final
Team Ackland 🔨	0	3	0	0	3	3	X	X	X	X	9
Kristy Watling	1	0	2	0	0	0	X	X	X	X	3

Sheet B	1	2	3	4	5	6	7	8	9	10	Final
Alyssa Calvert 🔨	1	0	2	1	0	0	0	1	1	0	6
Grace Beaudry	0	1	0	0	2	1	2	0	0	2	8

Sheet C	1	2	3	4	5	6	7	8	9	10	Final
Jennifer Jones 🔨	0	2	3	0	0	2	1	X	X	X	8
Lisa McLeod	1	0	0	1	0	0	0	X	X	X	2

=== Draw 9 ===
Friday, January 27, 9:00 am

Sheet A	1	2	3	4	5	6	7	8	9	10	Final
Darcy Robertson	0	1	1	3	0	1	1	0	0	2	9
Emma Jensen 🔨	3	0	0	0	1	0	0	2	1	0	7

Sheet B	1	2	3	4	5	6	7	8	9	10	Final
Kaitlyn Lawes	0	2	0	0	3	0	2	1	1	X	9
Chelsea Carey 🔨	1	0	0	1	0	2	0	0	0	X	4

Sheet C	1	2	3	4	5	6	7	8	9	10	Final
Beth Peterson 🔨	0	0	0	3	0	1	0	2	0	1	7
Katy Lukowich	0	1	3	0	0	0	1	0	1	0	6

=== Draw 10 ===
Friday, January 27, 1:00 pm

Sheet A	1	2	3	4	5	6	7	8	9	10	Final
Lisa McLeod	3	0	0	1	0	0	1	0	3	0	8
Grace Beaudry 🔨	0	2	3	0	1	0	0	3	0	1	10

Sheet B	1	2	3	4	5	6	7	8	9	10	Final
Jennifer Jones 🔨	0	0	1	5	0	1	0	1	1	1	10
Team Ackland	0	4	0	0	2	0	1	0	0	0	7

Sheet C	1	2	3	4	5	6	7	8	9	10	Final
Kristy Watling	0	0	1	0	0	X	X	X	X	X	1
Alyssa Calvert 🔨	0	4	0	2	1	X	X	X	X	X	7

== Championship round standings ==
Records from Round Robin carry over to the Championship Round

Key
Teams to Playoffs
Teams to Tiebreaker

Skip	W	L
Jennifer Jones	8	0
Kaitlyn Lawes	7	1
Beth Peterson	5	3
Team Ackland	5	3
Lisa McLeod	3	5
Darcy Robertson	3	5

== Championship round results ==
=== Draw 11 ===
Friday, January 27, 6:30 pm

Sheet A	1	2	3	4	5	6	7	8	9	10	Final
Kaitlyn Lawes 🔨	2	0	0	2	0	4	0	1	3	X	12
Team Ackland	0	3	1	0	2	0	1	0	0	X	7

Sheet B	1	2	3	4	5	6	7	8	9	10	Final
Beth Peterson	0	2	1	0	1	0	0	2	0	1	7
Lisa McLeod 🔨	2	0	0	0	0	1	0	0	2	0	5

Sheet C	1	2	3	4	5	6	7	8	9	10	Final
Jennifer Jones 🔨	3	0	1	0	4	0	4	X	X	X	12
Darcy Robertson	0	1	0	2	0	1	0	X	X	X	4

=== Draw 12 ===
Saturday, January 28, 10:00 am

Sheet A	1	2	3	4	5	6	7	8	9	10	Final
Jennifer Jones 🔨	1	0	2	0	0	1	0	2	0	3	9
Beth Peterson	0	2	0	1	0	0	2	0	2	0	7

Sheet B	1	2	3	4	5	6	7	8	9	10	Final
Team Ackland 🔨	0	3	0	5	1	X	X	X	X	X	9
Darcy Robertson	0	0	1	0	0	X	X	X	X	X	1

Sheet C	1	2	3	4	5	6	7	8	9	10	Final
Kaitlyn Lawes	1	1	4	3	0	X	X	X	X	X	9
Lisa McLeod 🔨	0	0	0	0	1	X	X	X	X	X	1

=== Draw 13 ===
Saturday, January 28, 4:00 pm

Sheet A	1	2	3	4	5	6	7	8	9	10	Final
Lisa McLeod	0	4	0	0	0	0	1	0	0	X	5
Darcy Robertson 🔨	1	0	2	1	3	1	0	0	1	X	9

Sheet B	1	2	3	4	5	6	7	8	9	10	Final
Kaitlyn Lawes 🔨	1	0	2	0	0	1	0	1	0	0	5
Jennifer Jones	0	2	0	0	1	0	2	0	2	2	9

Sheet C	1	2	3	4	5	6	7	8	9	10	Final
Beth Peterson 🔨	1	0	2	0	0	2	0	0	0	X	5
Team Ackland	0	2	0	0	2	0	2	2	1	X	9

== Tiebreaker ==
Saturday, January 28, 8:00 pm

Sheet B	1	2	3	4	5	6	7	8	9	10	Final
Beth Peterson 🔨	0	1	0	1	0	1	0	X	X	X	3
Team Ackland	3	0	2	0	1	0	3	X	X	X	9

== Playoffs ==
Semifinal			Final
			1	Jennifer Jones	10
2	Kaitlyn Lawes	5	3	Team Ackland	5
3	Team Ackland	8

=== Semifinal ===
Sunday, January 29, 9:30 am

Sheet B	1	2	3	4	5	6	7	8	9	10	Final
Kaitlyn Lawes 🔨	1	0	1	0	2	0	1	0	0	0	5
Team Ackland	0	1	0	3	0	1	0	1	1	1	8

=== Final ===
Sunday, January 29, 2:00 pm

Sheet B	1	2	3	4	5	6	7	8	9	10	Final
Jennifer Jones 🔨	2	0	2	0	2	2	0	2	X	X	10
Team Ackland	0	2	0	1	0	0	2	0	X	X	5

2023 Manitoba Scotties Tournament of Hearts

Jennifer Jones
9th Manitoba Provincial Championship title
