= MCT Showdown =

World Curling Tour event

- Established: 2014
- Host city: East St. Paul, Manitoba
- Arena: East St. Paul Curling Club
- Men's purse: $9,000
- Women's purse: $9,000

Current champions (2026)
- Men: (Manitoba) Braden Calvert
- Women: (Manitoba) Beth Peterson

The MCT Showdown, formerly The Sunova Spiel at East St. Paul is an annual bonspiel, or curling tournament on the Manitoba Curling Tour, held at the East St. Paul Curling Club in East St. Paul, Manitoba. It was part of the Men's and Women's World Curling Tour from 2014 to 2019.

== Men ==
=== Past champions ===
Year	Winner	Runner up	Purse (CAD)
2014	(Manitoba) Sean Grassie, Corey Chambers, Kody Janzen, Stuart Shiells	(Manitoba) Ryan Bay, Travis Bale, Brad Van Walleghem, Ronan Gueret	$10,000
2015	(Manitoba) Taylor McIntyre, Sam Good, Riley Smith, Jared Hancox	(Manitoba) Daley Peters, Corey Chambers, Kody Janzen, Stuart Shiells	$10,000
2016	(Manitoba) Matt Dunstone, Alex Forrest, Ian McMillan, Connor Njegovan	(Manitoba) David Bohn, Justin Richter, Tyler Forrest, Bryce J. McEwen	$10,000
2017	(Manitoba) David Bohn, Justin Richter, Tyler Forrest, Bryce J. McEwen	(Manitoba) Travis Bale, Andrew Irving, Geoff Lang, Brad Van Walleghem	$10,000
2018	(Manitoba) Braden Calvert, Kyle Kurz, Ian McMillan, Rob Gordon	(Manitoba) David Bohn, Justin Richter, Tyler Forrest, Bryce J. McEwen	$10,500
2019	(Manitoba) Sean Grassie, Tyler Drews, Daryl Evans, Rodney Legault	(Manitoba) Corey Chambers, Julien Leduc, Devon Wiebe, Stuart Shiells	$10,500
2020–22	Cancelled		
2023	(Manitoba) Jordon McDonald, Dallas Burgess, Elias Huminicki, Cameron Olafson	(Manitoba) Thomas McGillivray, Tim Johnson, Aaron Macdonell, Alexandre Fontaine	$10,000
2024	(Manitoba) Braden Calvert, Corey Chambers, Kyle Kurz, Brendan Bilawka	(Manitoba) Brett Walter, JT Ryan, Graham McFarlane, Hugh McFarlane	$10,000
2025	(Manitoba) Tanner Lott, Riley Smith, Adam Flatt, Sean Flatt	(Manitoba) Steve Irwin, Daley Peters, Travis Taylor, Travis Brooks	$7,000
2026	(Manitoba) Braden Calvert, Corey Chambers, Kyle Kurz, Brendan Bilawka	(Manitoba) Brett Walter, Julien Leduc, Graham McFarlane, Hugh McFarlane	$9,000

== Women ==
=== Past champions ===
Year	Winner	Runner up	Purse (CAD)
2014	(Manitoba) Michelle Montford, Lisa DeRiviere, Sara Van Walleghem, Sarah Neufeld	(Manitoba) Barb Spencer, Katie Spencer, Holly Spencer, Sydney Arnal	$10,000
2015	(Manitoba) Jennifer Clark-Rouire, Rachel Burtnyk, Lindsay Warkentin, Kylee Calvert	(Manitoba) Lisa Menard, Sam Murata, Lesle Cafferty, Laurie Macdonell	$10,000
2016	(Ontario) Tracy Fleury, Jennifer Wylie, Jenna Walsh, Amanda Gates	(Manitoba) Michelle Englot, Kate Cameron, Leslie Wilson-Westcott, Raunora Westcott	$10,000
2017	(Manitoba) Barb Spencer, Katie Spencer, Holly Spencer, Allyson Spencer	(Manitoba) Rhonda Varnes, Jenna Loder, Katherine Doerksen, Danielle Robinson	$10,000
2018	(Manitoba) Joelle Brown, Susan Baleja, Natalie Claude-Harding, Carlene Strand	(Manitoba) Abby Ackland, Hailey Ryan, Emilie Rafsnon, Sara Oliver	$10,500
2019	(Manitoba) Mackenzie Zacharias, Karlee Burgess, Emily Zacharias, Lauren Lenentine	(Manitoba) Darcy Robertson, Laura Burtnyk, Gaetanne Gauthier, Krysten Karwacki	$7,300
2020–22	Cancelled		
2023	(Manitoba) Kristy Watling, Laura Burtnyk, Emily Deschenes, Sarah Pyke	(Manitoba) Rachel Kaatz, Jenna Boisvert, Gaetanne Gauthier, Kadriana Lott	$10,000
2024	(South Korea) Kang Bo-bae, Kim Min-seo, Shim Yu-jeong, Kim Ji-soo	(Manitoba) Beth Peterson, Kelsey Calvert, Katherine Remillard, Melissa Gordon-Kurz	$10,000
2025	(Manitoba) Lisa McLeod, Christine MacKay, Emily Cherwinski, Jolene Callum	(Manitoba) Beth Peterson, Kelsey Calvert, Katherine Remillard, Melissa Gordon-Kurz	$5,500
2026	(Manitoba) Beth Peterson, Katherine Remillard, Kristin Gordon, Melissa Gordon-Kurz	(Manitoba) Lisa McLeod, Mikaylah Lyburn, Brooklyn Meiklejohn, Jolene Callum	$9,000
