= Brianna Cullen =

Canadian curler

- Curler
- Born: April 27, 2001 (age 25); Dauphin, Manitoba

Team
- Curling club: East St. Paul CC, East St. Paul, MB
- Skip: Selena Sturmay
- Third: Danielle Schmiemann
- Second: Dezaray Hawes
- Lead: Paige Papley
- Alternate: Brianna Cullen

Curling career
- Member Association: Manitoba (2015–2020; 2024–2026); Alberta (2020–2024; 2026–present)
- Top CTRS ranking: 7th (2024–25)
Medal record
Curling
Representing Canada
World University Games
Bronze medal – third place	2025 Turin	Team

Brianna Carmel Cullen (born April 27, 2000, in Dauphin) is a Canadian curler from Oakbank, Manitoba. She is currently the alternate on Team Selena Sturmay.

== Career ==
=== Youth ===
In 2020, Cullen and her team of Serena Gray-Withers, Kathryn Cullen and Lane Prokopowich reached the finals of the Manitoba U21 provincial championship where they lost to Mackenzie Zacharias. Zacharias then went on to win the 2020 Canadian and World Junior Championships.

Because of a change in dates for the Canadian Junior championships during the 2020–21 season, Curling Canada selected the athletes that would represent Canada at the 2021 World Junior Curling Championships. Cullen was chosen for this team, alongside Abby Marks, Catherine Clifford and Jamie Scott. However, the world championship was cancelled due to the COVID-19 pandemic.

After graduating high school, Cullen was recruited to the University of Alberta Pandas curling team where she played second on the junior team led by Gray-Withers. In 2022, with teammates Zoe Cinnamon and Anna Munroe, the team won the Alberta junior championship, defeating Olivia Jones 6–5 in the provincial final. This qualified the team for the 2022 Canadian Junior Curling Championships where they finished 5–3 in the round robin, enough to qualify for the playoffs. They then lost 7–4 to Ontario's Emily Deschenes in the quarterfinals, eliminating them in fifth place.

=== Women's ===
Aged out of juniors, Munroe left the team and was replaced by Catherine Clifford who joined at the third position, shifting Cinnamon to lead. This new lineup found immediate success, winning the inaugural U25 NextGen Classic and earning a berth into Curling Canada's NextGen Program. On the women's tour, the team found considerable success as a new team, winning the second event of the Alberta Curling Series and reaching the quarterfinals of the 2022 Saville Shoot-Out and the DeKalb Superspiel. They also competed in the 2022 Tour Challenge Tier 2 Grand Slam of Curling event where they finished 1–3. In the new year, the team represented the Alberta Pandas at the 2023 U Sports/Curling Canada University Curling Championships. Building on their success from the women's tour, the team reached the playoffs with a 4–3 record before defeating the Memorial Sea-Hawks and the Dalhousie Tigers in the semifinal and gold medal games to secure the title. Also during the 2022–23 season, Cullen won the 2022 World University Games Qualifier as second for Abby Marks and the team went on to represent Canada at the 2023 Winter World University Games where they finished with a 4–5 record, missing the playoffs.

To begin the 2023–24 season, Team Gray-Withers defended their title at the U25 NextGen Classic. They also had a strong showing in their first tour event, the 2023 Saville Shootout, defeating the likes of Kerri Einarson and Gim Eun-ji en route to a semifinal finish. Because they won the U Sport title the season before, the team earned a berth into the 2023 PointsBet Invitational. There, they lost in the first round to Isabelle Ladouceur. Back on tour, the team reached the semifinals at the Saville Grand Prix and Ladies Alberta Open, however, failed to reach the playoffs at five other tour events, including the 2023 Tour Challenge Tier 2. Despite this, they earned enough points to qualify for the 2024 Alberta Scotties Tournament of Hearts, their first appearance at the provincial women's championship. Entering as the second seeds, Team Gray-Withers had a strong performance, finishing the round robin with a 5–2 record and qualifying for the playoffs. They then faced Kayla Skrlik in the semifinal where they lost 9–8 in an extra end. To end the season, the team played in the 2024 U Sports/Curling Canada University Curling Championships after securing the Canada West title. There, the team ran the table with a perfect 9–0 record to secure their second consecutive title and qualify as Team Canada for the 2025 Winter World University Games the following season. Following the season, Cullen left Alberta and moved back to Manitoba where she joined Team Kate Cameron as their new second. The team also included third Taylor McDonald and lead Mackenzie Elias

In their first event as a new team, Team Cameron reached the semifinals of the Icebreaker Challenge. At the 2024 PointsBet Invitational, the team had a strong showing, winning their first two games to reach the final four before being eliminated by Kayla Skrlik. They also had good results at the Alberta Curling Series events, losing two finals to Korea's Gim Eun-ji and Park You-been. Despite failing to qualify at the 2024 Tour Challenge Tier 2, the team had a pair of playoff appearances at the 2024 Western Showdown and New Year Curling in Miyota. In the new year, the World University Games conflicted with the 2025 RME Women of the Rings, forcing Cullen to miss the provincial championship. At the Games, Team Gray-Withers finished 7–2 through the round robin to advance to the playoffs. They then lost 6–5 to Japan's Yuina Miura in the semifinal but bounced back to beat Norway's Torild Bjørnstad in the bronze medal game. At the provincial championship, with Allison Flaxey replacing Cullen, Team Cameron won the provincial title, defeating Beth Peterson 7–6 in the championship game. This earned the team the right to represent Manitoba at the 2025 Scotties Tournament of Hearts, Cullen's firsts appearance at the event. There, the team had mixed results, ultimately finishing sixth in their pool with a 4–4 record and failing to advance to the championship round. After the Scotties, the team announced they would be parting ways with Cullen for the upcoming season.

For the 2025–26 season, Cullen joined the Rachel Kaatz rink at third. This team competed only in Manitoba and found some success, making it to the semifinals of the MCT Challenge and the quarterfinals of the Mother Club Fall Curling Classic. After winning the Winnipeg qualifier for the 2026 RME Women of the Rings, the team went 1–4 at the provincial championship. Cullen also joined the Beth Peterson rink as their alternate at the 2025 Canadian Olympic Curling Pre-Trials where they finished in eighth place with a 2–5 record.

== Personal life ==
Cullen was born in Dauphin and grew up in Swan Lake, Manitoba. She is a bachelor of kinesiology graduate from the University of Alberta.

== Teams ==
Season	Skip	Third	Second	Lead	Alternate
2015–16	Kathryn Cullen	Kaylee Klaprat	Brianna Cullen	Samantha Kaluzny	
2017–18	Shaelynn Lukey	Delaney Betcher	Brianna Cullen	Haley Ferriss	
2018–19	Serena Gray-Withers	Kathryn Cullen	Brianna Cullen	Lane Prokopowich	
2019–20	Serena Gray-Withers	Kathryn Cullen	Brianna Cullen	Lane Prokopowich	
2020–21	Serena Gray-Withers	Zoe Cinnamon	Brianna Cullen	Emma Wiens	
2021–22	Serena Gray-Withers	Zoe Cinnamon	Brianna Cullen	Anna Munroe	
2022–23	Serena Gray-Withers	Catherine Clifford	Brianna Cullen	Zoe Cinnamon	
2023–24	Serena Gray-Withers	Catherine Clifford	Brianna Cullen	Zoe Cinnamon	
2024–25	Kate Cameron	Taylor McDonald	Brianna Cullen	Mackenzie Elias	
2025–26	Rachel Kaatz	Brianna Cullen	Zoey Terrick	Jaycee Terrick	
2026–27	Selena Sturmay	Danielle Schmiemann	Dezaray Hawes	Paige Papley	Brianna Cullen
