= Sara Oliver =

Canadian curler

- Curler
- Born: July 8, 1996 (age 30); Winnipeg, Manitoba

Team
- Curling club: Assiniboine Memorial CC, Winnipeg, MB

Curling career
- Member Association: Manitoba
- Hearts: 1 (2023)
- Top CTRS ranking: 7th (2022–23)
Medal record
Curling
Representing Canada
World Mixed Championship
Gold medal – first place	2019 Aberdeen

Sara Oliver (born July 8, 1996) is a Canadian curler from Winnipeg. She is a former World Mixed Curling Champion.

== Career ==
=== Juniors ===
Oliver skipped teams at both the 2014 and 2015 Manitoba Junior Curling Championships going 4–3 in both years, and losing in a tiebreaker in 2015.

In 2015, Oliver joined the Abby Ackland junior rink, playing lead on the team. The rink won the 2016 Manitoba Junior Championship, sending the team to the 2016 Canadian Junior Curling Championships to represent Manitoba. The team finished 5–1 through the round robin and tied for third in the championship pool at 7–3. This put them in a tiebreaker against New Brunswick's Justine Comeau which they lost 7–5, eliminating them from contention.

In 2016, Oliver joined the Laura Burtnyk rink as the team's second. The team won the 2017 Manitoba juniors, sending Oliver to play for Manitoba once again at the 2017 Canadian Junior Curling Championships. There, the team finished with a 5–4 record, missing the championship round.

In 2017, Oliver played her last junior season playing third on the Meghan Walter rink. That season, the team lost in the finals of the Manitoba junior championship.

=== Women's ===
Oliver joined up with Abby Ackland again in 2018 as her lead. The team also included third Hailey Ryan and second Emilie Rafnson. In their first season together, the team had impressive results at The Sunova Spiel at East St. Paul where they reached the final, the Manitoba Curling Tour Classic where they reached the semifinals and the Mother Club Fall Curling Classic where they were quarterfinalists. They qualified for the 2019 Manitoba Scotties Tournament of Hearts through the Winnipeg region and surprised many with a strong 5–2 record in the round robin. This put them in a tiebreaker, which they won 8–7 over Beth Peterson to qualify for the playoff round. They then lost 6–4 to Kerri Einarson in the 3 vs. 4 game.

Team Ackland stayed together for the 2019–20 season where they found more success on tour. The team won their first event at the Atkins Curling Supplies Classic and made the final of the Manitoba Curling Tour Classic. They also had two other semifinal appearances at the DeKalb Superspiel and the Mother Club Fall Curling Classic. After their great run through the 2019 event, the team could not replicate their success at the 2020 Manitoba Scotties Tournament of Hearts, failing to qualify for the playoffs following a 3–2 record. Ackland could not play in the event, as she was eight months pregnant. Instead, Hailey Ryan took over the reins.

Ryan left the team at the conclusion of the 2019–20 season and she was replaced with Robyn Njegovan for the 2020–21 season. The team played in two events during the abbreviated season, reaching the semifinals of both the Atkins Curling Supplies Classic and the MCT Cargill Curling Training Centre Fall Classic. Second Emilie Rafnson left the team the next season and was replaced by Kaitlyn Jones who took over as skip of the team. Due to the COVID-19 pandemic in Canada, the qualification process for the 2021 Canadian Olympic Curling Trials had to be modified to qualify enough teams for the championship. In these modifications, Curling Canada created the 2021 Canadian Curling Pre-Trials Direct-Entry Event, an event where eight teams would compete to try to earn one of two spots into the 2021 Canadian Olympic Curling Pre-Trials. Team Jones qualified for the Pre-Trials Direct-Entry Event as the top seed. They lost both the B and C qualifier games to Jessie Hunkin and Jill Brothers respectively. On tour, the team had an undefeated run at the SaskTour Women's Nutana up until the final where they lost to Jessica Mitchell. They also had deep runs at the Atkins Curling Supplies Classic and the SaskTour Women's Moose Jaw but lost in the semifinals at both events. At the 2022 Manitoba Scotties Tournament of Hearts, Team Jones qualified for the playoffs after a 6–2 record through the round robin and championship pool. In the semifinal, they fell 8–6 to Kristy Watling.

Team Jones parted ways after just one season, with Oliver and Ackland joining forces with Meghan Walter and Mackenzie Elias to form a new team for the 2022–23 season. After a slow start, the team found their footing at the 2022 Western Showdown where they advanced all the way to the final before losing to Silvana Tirinzoni. The team again qualified at the 2022 Curlers Corner Autumn Gold Curling Classic where they lost in the quarterfinals to Gim Eun-ji. Team Ackland changed their lineup halfway through the season with Walter taking over as the new skip. This switch paid off immediately with the team winning the DeKalb Superspiel in December 2022. The team made their first Grand Slam event at the 2023 Canadian Open where they qualified for the playoffs through the B side. They then lost in the quarterfinals to Tean Gim. Team Ackland competed in the 2023 Manitoba Scotties Tournament of Hearts where they finished 3–2 through the round robin. They went on to a 5–3 record in the championship pool, enough to qualify for a tiebreaker. There, they won 9–3 over Beth Peterson to qualify for the semifinal where they upset Kaitlyn Lawes 8–5. In the championship game, they lost 10–5 to Jennifer Jones, ending their run. Despite this, Team Ackland still qualified for the 2023 Scotties Tournament of Hearts as Wild Card #3 thanks to their CTRS points earned throughout the season. At the Hearts, the team finished fifth in their pool with a 3–5 record, earning wins over the Northwest Territories, New Brunswick, and the Yukon.

After the season, Oliver and Ackland joined the new Jolene Campbell rink at lead and third, respectively.

=== Mixed ===
In 2018, Oliver qualified for the 2019 Canadian Mixed Curling Championship in Winnipeg, playing lead on the Manitoba team led by Colin Kurz. The team finished 7–3 through the round robin and championship round to qualify for the playoffs as the second seed. They then beat Ontario 9–1 in the semifinal before winning 7–4 over Nova Scotia in the gold medal game. The win qualified the team to represent Canada at the 2019 World Mixed Curling Championship where they dominated through the round robin with a 7–0 record. In the playoffs, they scored wins over Sweden, Denmark and Norway to qualify for the gold medal game against Germany's Andy Kapp. There, the Canadian team scored two in the eighth end for a 6–5 win to become the world champions.

== Personal life ==
Oliver is originally from Marquette, Manitoba, and went to high school at Warren Collegiate Institute in nearby Warren. Oliver attended the University of Manitoba. She works as a massage therapist for Warren Chiropractic and Health Centre.

== Teams ==
Season	Skip	Third	Second	Lead
2013–14	Meaghan Brezden	Sara Oliver	Danielle Lafleur	Nikki Boulet
2014–15	Meaghan Brezden	Sara Oliver	Danielle Lafleur	Nikki Boulet
2015–16	Abby Ackland	Robyn Njegovan	Melissa Gordon	Sara Oliver
2016–17	Laura Burtnyk	Hailey Ryan	Sara Oliver	Rebecca Cormier
2017–18	Meghan Walter	Sara Oliver	Morgan Reimer	Mackenzie Elias
2018–19	Abby Ackland	Hailey Ryan	Emilie Rafnson	Sara Oliver
2019–20	Abby Ackland	Hailey Ryan	Emilie Rafnson	Sara Oliver
2020–21	Abby Ackland	Robyn Njegovan	Emilie Rafnson	Sara Oliver
2021–22	Kaitlyn Jones	Abby Ackland	Robyn Njegovan	Sara Oliver
2022–23	Meghan Walter	Abby Ackland	Sara Oliver	Mackenzie Elias
2023–24	Jolene Campbell	Abby Ackland	Rachel Erickson	Sara Oliver
