= Melissa Gordon-Kurz =

Canadian curler

- Curler
- Born: Melissa Gordon; July 24, 1994 (age 32); Winnipeg, Manitoba

Team
- Curling club: Assiniboine Memorial CC, Winnipeg, MB
- Skip: Kelsey Calvert
- Third: Beth Peterson
- Second: Katherine Remillard
- Lead: Melissa Gordon-Kurz

Curling career
- Member Association: Manitoba
- Hearts: 1 (2026)
- Top CTRS ranking: 8th (2024–25)

Melissa Gordon-Kurz (born July 24, 1994, as Melissa Gordon) is a Canadian curler from Winnipeg, Manitoba. She currently plays lead on Team Kelsey Calvert.

== Career ==
=== Juniors ===
Gordon-Kurz represented Manitoba at the 2011 Canada Winter Games alongside teammates Beth Peterson, Robyn Njegovan and Breanne Yozenko. There, they finished third in their pool with a 2–3 record, not enough to advance to the playoff round. In 2015, the same team won the 2015 Manitoba Junior provincial championship. At the 2015 Canadian Junior Curling Championships, they finished in fifth place with a 6–4 record. The following season, Team Peterson began competing on the World Curling Tour and finished runner-up at the 2015 Mother Club Fall Curling Classic. As Peterson and Yozenko aged out of juniors, Gordon-Kurz and Njegovan brought on Abby Ackland to skip their team at the Manitoba Junior championship with Sara Oliver at lead. Together, the new lineup won the junior provincial title and represented Manitoba at the 2016 Canadian Junior Curling Championships. At junior nationals, the Ackland rink led Manitoba to a 7–3 record through the round robin and championship pools. They then lost to New Brunswick's Justine Comeau in a tiebreaker, eliminating them from contention.

=== Women's ===
Back with Team Peterson, Gordon-Kurz won her first tour event at the 2016 Atkins Curling Supplies Classic where her team defeated Darcy Robertson 7–6 in the final. At the 2017 Manitoba Scotties Tournament of Hearts, Team Peterson finished with a 4–3 record, not enough to qualify for the playoff round. During the 2017–18 season, Team Peterson won the Fort Garry Industries Bonspiel, beating out Katie Chappellaz in the final. The team also reached the semifinals of the Atkins Curling Supplies Classic and the quarterfinals of the MCT Championships. Despite their successes on tour, Team Peterson was unable to advance to the 2018 Manitoba Scotties Tournament of Hearts after losing out in their regional qualifiers.

Gordon-Kurz and Peterson added Jenna Loder and Katherine Doerksen to their team for the 2018–19 season. The team had three semifinal finishes on the tour and won the Manitoba Scotties Berth Bonspiel to qualify for the 2019 Manitoba Scotties Tournament of Hearts. There, the team had their most successful provincial championship to date, finishing 5–2 through the round robin and qualifying for a tiebreaker against Abby Ackland. Despite tying the game in the seventh end, Team Peterson would give up three points in the eighth end, ultimately losing the game 8–7. The 2019–20 season was a successful season for the Peterson rink as they qualified for the playoffs in eight of their ten events. They also got to play in their first Grand Slam of Curling event at the 2019 Tour Challenge Tier 2 where they lost in the semifinal to South Korea's Kim Min-ji. Despite entering the 2020 Manitoba Scotties Tournament of Hearts as the fourth seed, Team Peterson finished the round robin with a 2–3 record, failing to reach the championship pool round.

Due to the COVID-19 pandemic in Canada, many provinces had to cancel their provincial championships, with member associations selecting their representatives for the 2021 Scotties Tournament of Hearts. Due to this situation, Curling Canada added three Wild Card teams to the national championship, which were chosen according to the CTRS standings from the 2019–20 season. Because Team Peterson ranked 12th on the CTRS and kept at least three of their four players together for the 2020–21 season, they got the third Wild Card spot at the 2021 Scotties in Calgary, Alberta. However, Gordon-Kurz opted to not attend the Scotties due to work commitments, and was replaced by Brittany Tran. At the Tournament of Hearts, the team finished with a respectable 7–5 fifth-place finish.

In their first event of the 2021–22 season, Team Peterson reached the final of the Mother Club Fall Curling Classic where they lost to Mackenzie Zacharias. They were then semifinalists at the Atkins Curling Supplies Classic. With their successful results over the past few seasons, Team Peterson had enough points to qualify for the 2021 Canadian Olympic Curling Pre-Trials. There, the team missed the playoffs after a 1–5 record. At the 2022 Manitoba Scotties Tournament of Hearts, the team began with two straight wins before losing the rest of their games, finishing just outside the playoffs at 2–3. Team Peterson rounded out their season at the 2022 Best of the West where they lost in the final to Corryn Brown.

To begin the 2022–23 season, Team Peterson qualified for the playoffs at three straight events. They began with a semifinal finish at the Mother Club Fall Curling Classic before winning the Atkins Curling Supplies Classic. The team then played in the 2022 Western Showdown, however, with Robyn Silvernagle sparing for Peterson at skip. At the event, the team defeated many higher seeds such as Kim Eun-jung, Clancy Grandy and Isabella Wranå, ultimately losing in the semifinals to Silvana Tirinzoni. Team Peterson had a strong showing at the 2023 Manitoba Scotties Tournament of Hearts, beginning with a 4–1 record through the round robin. They went on to finish 5–3 after the championship round and then lost a tiebreaker to Meghan Walter to advance to the playoffs. The team ended their season at the Best of the West where they were again defeated by Corryn Brown in the championship game. Peterson was replaced by Kelsey Rocque for the event.

For the 2023–24 season, Team Peterson added Kelsey Rocque to their lineup at third with Jenna Loder shifting to alternate. On tour, the team found moderate success, as they won the MCT Shootout in September and the MCT Championships in January. They also reached a pair of semifinals and made it to the quarterfinals of the Red Deer Curling Classic, before losing to the country's number one ranked team, Rachel Homan, who ultimately won the event. At the 2024 Manitoba Scotties Tournament of Hearts, Team Peterson made it to the championship round with a 3–2 record, and then won four straight to earn a spot in the semifinal, where they defeated Kate Cameron 8–4. That put them up into the final against Kaitlyn Lawes and in a very tight game, they lost 9–8. The following season, they defended their title at the MCT Championships and lost the final of the MCT Curling Cup and the MCT Showdown. They also competed in the 2024 Tour Challenge Tier 2 where they lost in the quarterfinals to Sayaka Yoshimura. At the 2025 RME Women of the Rings, the provincial championship, Team Peterson finished 5–3 through the round robin and championship pools, earning a tiebreaker berth where they eliminated Hailey McFarlane. They then beat Darcy Robertson in the semifinal before coming up short again in the final to Kate Cameron, finishing second.

Team Peterson began the 2025–26 season at the 2025 Masters Tier 2 Grand Slam where they finished 1–3. Next, the team played in the 2025 PointsBet Invitational, qualifying through the CTRS rankings. There, they finished 2–2, securing wins over Kaitlyn Lawes and Myla Plett. They then played in the 2025 Canadian Olympic Curling Pre-Trials where they had a disappointing last place finish. After the event, Peterson and third Kelsey Calvert switched positions, with Calvert taking over as skip of the team prior to the 2026 RME Women of the Rings. This switch paid off as after losing the final for two consecutive years, Gordon-Kurz won her first Manitoba Women's Championship, beating Team Lawes 9–7 in the final. This earned the team the right to represent Manitoba at the 2026 Scotties Tournament of Hearts in Mississauga, Ontario. At the 2026 Scotties, Team Peterson would finish round-robin play with a perfect 8–0 record, qualifying for the playoffs. However, in the playoffs, they would then lose to Kerri Einarson and Selena Sturmay, finishing in 5th place.

=== Mixed ===
Gordon-Kurz won the 2020 Manitoba mixed provincial championship as lead for Braden Calvert. However, the team did not represent Manitoba at the national championship. Three years later, she won the provincial championship again, playing lead for husband Kyle Kurz. At the 2023 Canadian Mixed Curling Championship, Manitoba finished the round robin undefeated. In the championship round, they lost just one game (against Saskatchewan), giving them a 9–1 record. After beating Ontario in the semifinal, they played Saskatchewan again in the final and lost 6–4, earning a silver medal in the process.

=== Mixed doubles ===
In addition to mixed, Gordon-Kurz and Kurz teamed up in mixed doubles and won the 2019 Manitoba provincial championship. At the 2019 Canadian Mixed Doubles Curling Championship, the pair finished 5–2 in the round robin, enough to qualify for the playoffs. They then lost 7–4 to Kadriana and Colton Lott in the round of 12, eliminating them from contention.

== Personal life ==
Gordon-Kurz works as an early childhood educator at the Stanley Knowles Children's Centre. She is married to fellow curler Kyle Kurz, and has two children.

== Teams ==
Season	Skip	Third	Second	Lead	Alternate
2010–11	Beth Peterson	Robyn Njegovan	Melissa Gordon	Breanne Yozenko	
2011–12	Beth Peterson	Robyn Njegovan	Melissa Gordon	Breanne Yozenko	
2012–13	Beth Peterson	Robyn Njegovan	Melissa Gordon	Breanne Yozenko	
2013–14	Beth Peterson	Robyn Njegovan	Melissa Gordon	Breanne Yozenko	
2014–15	Beth Peterson	Robyn Njegovan	Melissa Gordon	Breanne Yozenko	
2015–16	Beth Peterson	Robyn Njegovan	Melissa Gordon	Breanne Yozenko	
2016–17	Beth Peterson	Robyn Njegovan	Melissa Gordon	Breanne Yozenko	Lindsay Warkentin
2017–18	Beth Peterson	Robyn Njegovan	Melissa Gordon	Breanne Yozenko	Lindsay Warkentin
2018–19	Beth Peterson	Jenna Loder	Katherine Doerksen	Melissa Gordon	Robyn Njegovan
2019–20	Beth Peterson	Jenna Loder	Katherine Doerksen	Melissa Gordon	Nicole Sigvaldason
2020–21	Beth Peterson	Jenna Loder	Katherine Doerksen	Melissa Gordon	Meghan Walter
2021–22	Beth Peterson	Jenna Loder	Katherine Doerksen	Melissa Gordon	
2022–23	Beth Peterson	Jenna Loder	Katherine Doerksen	Melissa Gordon	
2023–24	Beth Peterson	Kelsey Rocque	Katherine Doerksen	Melissa Gordon-Kurz	Jenna Loder
2024–25	Beth Peterson	Kelsey Calvert	Katherine Remillard	Melissa Gordon-Kurz	Meghan Walter
2025–26	Beth Peterson	Kelsey Calvert	Katherine Remillard	Melissa Gordon-Kurz	
2025–26	Kelsey Calvert	Beth Peterson	Katherine Remillard	Melissa Gordon-Kurz	
2026–27	Kelsey Calvert	Beth Peterson	Katherine Remillard	Melissa Gordon-Kurz	
