= Robyn Henry =

Canadian curler

- Curler
- Born: Robyn Njegovan; July 6, 1994 (age 32); Winnipeg, Manitoba

Team
- Curling club: Assiniboine Memorial CC, Winnipeg, MB
- Mixed doubles partner: Rob Gordon

Curling career
- Member Association: Manitoba
- Hearts: 1 (2022)
- Top CTRS ranking: 22nd (2021–22)

Robyn Henry (born July 6, 1994 as Robyn Njegovan) is a retired Canadian curler from Winnipeg, Manitoba.

== Career ==
=== Juniors ===
Henry represented Manitoba at the 2011 Canada Winter Games alongside teammates Beth Peterson, Melissa Gordon and Breanne Yozenko. There, they finished third in their pool with a 2–3 record, not enough to advance to the playoff round. In 2015, the same team won the 2015 Manitoba Junior provincial championship. At the 2015 Canadian Junior Curling Championships, they finished in fifth place with a 6–4 record. The following season, Team Peterson began competing on the World Curling Tour and finished runner-up at the 2015 Mother Club Fall Curling Classic. As Peterson and Yozenko aged out of juniors, Henry and Gordon brought on Abby Ackland to skip their team at the Manitoba Junior championship with Sara Oliver at lead. Together, the new lineup won the junior provincial title and represented Manitoba at the 2016 Canadian Junior Curling Championships. At junior nationals, the Ackland rink led Manitoba to a 7–3 record through the round robin and championship pools. They then lost to New Brunswick's Justine Comeau in a tiebreaker, eliminating them from contention.

=== Women's ===
Back with Team Peterson, Henry won her first tour event at the 2016 Atkins Curling Supplies Classic where her team defeated Darcy Robertson 7–6 in the final. At the 2017 Manitoba Scotties Tournament of Hearts, Team Peterson finished with a 4–3 record, not enough to qualify for the playoff round. During the 2017–18 season, Team Peterson won the Fort Garry Industries Bonspiel, beating out Katie Chappellaz in the final. The team also reached the semifinals of the Atkins Curling Supplies Classic and the quarterfinals of the MCT Championships. Despite their successes on tour, Team Peterson was unable to advance to the 2018 Manitoba Scotties Tournament of Hearts after losing out in their regional qualifiers.

After taking two seasons off, Henry returned for the 2020–21 season with her new team of skip Abby Ackland, second Emilie Rafnson, lead Sara Oliver and alternate Brandi Forrest. The team played in two events during the abbreviated season, reaching the semifinals of both the Atkins Curling Supplies Classic and the MCT Cargill Curling Training Centre Fall Classic. Second Emilie Rafnson left the team the next season and was replaced by Kaitlyn Jones who took over as skip of the team. Due to the COVID-19 pandemic in Canada, the qualification process for the 2021 Canadian Olympic Curling Trials had to be modified to qualify enough teams for the championship. In these modifications, Curling Canada created the 2021 Canadian Curling Pre-Trials Direct-Entry Event, an event where eight teams would compete to try to earn one of two spots into the 2021 Canadian Olympic Curling Pre-Trials. Team Jones qualified for the Pre-Trials Direct-Entry Event as the top seed. They lost both the B and C qualifier games to Jessie Hunkin and Jill Brothers respectively. On tour, the team had an undefeated run at the SaskTour Women's Nutana up until the final where they lost to Jessica Mitchell. They also had deep runs at the Atkins Curling Supplies Classic and the SaskTour Women's Moose Jaw but lost in the semifinals at both events. At the 2022 Manitoba Scotties Tournament of Hearts, Team Jones qualified for the playoffs after a 6–2 record through the round robin and championship pool. In the semifinal, they fell 8–6 to Kristy Watling.

Henry was invited to be Team Tracy Fleury's alternate at the 2022 Scotties Tournament of Hearts as the team qualified as one of the Wild Card entries. The team included Henry's sister-in-law Selena Njegovan. Upon arrival into Thunder Bay for the event, the team announced that Tracy Fleury had tested positive for COVID-19 and would have to sit out much of the event. Because of this, Selena stepped up to skip the team with Robyn coming in to play third. Without Fleury, the team had a dominant performance through their seven games, finishing with a 6–1 record. Fleury then returned for the teams' final round robin game where they picked up another victory to close out the round robin first place in their pool. Despite earning a bye from the elimination games, the team lost the seeding game and then the 3 vs. 4 page playoff game, eliminating them from the event in fourth place.

Henry retired from competitive curling following the 2021–22 season.

=== Mixed doubles ===
In 2025, Henry teamed up with Rob Gordon to win the 2025 Manitoba provincial mixed doubles championship. At the 2025 Canadian Mixed Doubles Curling Championship, the pair finished fifth in their pool with a 3–4 record.

== Personal life ==
Henry works as a registered psychiatric nurse RPN at Health Sciences Centre. Her brother is fellow curler Connor Njegovan and her sister-in-law is Selena Njegovan.

== Teams ==
Season	Skip	Third	Second	Lead	Alternate
2010–11	Beth Peterson	Robyn Njegovan	Melissa Gordon	Breanne Yozenko	
2011–12	Beth Peterson	Robyn Njegovan	Melissa Gordon	Breanne Yozenko	
2012–13	Beth Peterson	Robyn Njegovan	Melissa Gordon	Breanne Yozenko	
2013–14	Beth Peterson	Robyn Njegovan	Melissa Gordon	Breanne Yozenko	
2014–15	Beth Peterson	Robyn Njegovan	Melissa Gordon	Breanne Yozenko	
2015–16	Beth Peterson	Robyn Njegovan	Melissa Gordon	Breanne Yozenko	
2015–16	Abby Ackland	Robyn Njegovan	Melissa Gordon	Sara Oliver	
2016–17	Beth Peterson	Robyn Njegovan	Melissa Gordon	Breanne Yozenko	Lindsay Warkentin
2017–18	Beth Peterson	Robyn Njegovan	Melissa Gordon	Breanne Yozenko	Lindsay Warkentin
2020–21	Abby Ackland	Robyn Njegovan	Emilie Rafnson	Sara Oliver	Brandi Forrest
2021–22	Kaitlyn Jones	Abby Ackland	Robyn Njegovan	Sara Oliver	
