= Heather Curling Club =

Curling club in Winnipeg, Manitoba

- Inside the Heather Curling Club in Winnipeg
- Interactive map of Heather Curling Club
- Location: 120 Rue Youville Winnipeg, Manitoba R2H 2S1; Canada; 49.875812°N 97.106906°W

Information
- Established: 1915
- Club type: Dedicated ice
- Curling Canada region: Curl Manitoba
- Sheets of ice: Eight
- Website: https://www.heathercurlingclub.org

The Heather Curling Club is a historic a multi-purpose venue located in the St. Boniface neighbourhood in Winnipeg, Manitoba. Known as "the Heather", this club is one of the main Francophone curling clubs in Manitoba. The curling club first opened on Christmas day in 1915, and the current venue opened in December of 1965. Significant renovations in the 1990s expanded the clubs purpose from solely a winter curling rink into a multi purpose venue capable of hosting events in the summer time.

== History ==
Originally known as the "St. Boniface Curling Club", it was funded by its most affluent members in its early years to maintain its original sheet of ice for over a decade. This support also kept the club going through the financial hardships of the 1930s and required renovations. By the 1950s the club's infrastructure was in need of repairs, and the members invested in new clubhouses, a new seven sheet rink, and the first artificial ice plant to be installed in greater Winnipeg at a cost of $10,000. by 1964, the supermarket chain Safeway offered to buy the club from the members and spent $350,000 to establish the current eight sheet rink still used in 2025. The club being at the forefront of modernisation at this time helped the venue attract significant events as host. As of the 2025 it has hosted Provincial championships like the Strathcona Seniors and the Green Valley Juniors. The venue has also been used to host the Canadian Postal Championship, the 1989 Canadian Pepsi Juniors, Knights of Columbus State Spiels and in 2008 the Friars’ Briar, the Canadian Chaplains Championship.

The club has several quality teams play out of their club throughout its history. The club has had two teams represent the province at the Canadian Men's Curling Championship: In 1976 Manitoba was represented by the Clare De Blonde team and in 1978 the Doug Harrison team represented Manitoba. Heather teams has also had success with their mixed gender team skipped by Ernie Boushy. This group won two Canadian Championships in 1964 and 1966. In 1980, Jim Dunstone also won a Canadian Mixed Curling Championship while representing the Heather. In 1989, Cathy Overton skipped her team when they won the Canadian Junior Women's Championship representing Manitoba, and in 2004, Martin Bailey's team won the Canadian Open Masters Championship curling out of the Heather.

Beyond the games on the ice, Manitoba Curling Hall of Famer Gary Smith also called the Heather Curling Club his home. He even served on the executive of the Heather and became its president in 1989. Gary appeared in 20 provincial championships and consistent volunteer at the youth level. He later became the clubs first honorary life member as well as president of the Manitoba Curling Association.

The Heather also host successful youth teams, including the 2026 Provincial U18 champions.

== Training Centre ==
In 2024, A coalition of governing bodies including Curling Canada, Curl Manitoba, Sport Manitoba, the Canadian Sport Centre Manitoba and the provincial government came together to announce a Regional Performance Hub and Development Centre at the Heather Curling Club. Two of the eight sheets of ice at the Heather were equipped with advanced tools, including video analysis, speed traps, smart brooms and championship-calibre stones. These training materials have attracted elite curlers to train at the Heather, including the team of four-time women's national champion Kerri Einarson. Other key athletes, including members of Team Chelsea Carey and Team Matt Dunstone, have also used this facility for training. This training centre is also home to Winnipeg's youth high performance program.

== Amenities ==
The club has a full-service kitchen and bar located at the club with seasonal hours tailored to the curling season. The social hall that can be rented in the summer time is licensed for 600 people with access to the kitchen and bar. Club members also host their own summer social events at the facility with the ice out too.

The club has instituted a unique membership fee program that allows each curler to participate in as many leagues as they can at no extra charge. It also gives members discounts for members to use for amenities, and free practice ice. The club has exceeded its projections for membership registrations under the new model.
