= East St. Paul Curling Club =

Curling club in East St. Paul, Manitoba

- Location: 260 Hoddinott Road; East St. Paul, Manitoba, Canada; R2E 0H7

Information
- Established: 1957, 69 years ago
- Club type: Dedicated ice
- Sheets of ice: Six
- Rock colours: Blue and Yellow

The East St. Paul Curling Club, located in East St. Paul, Manitoba, is a curling club in Western Canada that was founded in 1957. The club resides at 260 Hoddinott Road and was founded by a group of local citizens. Over the years, it has undergone multiple renovations.

In 2005, the club hosted the 2005 Canadian Senior Curling Championships.

The club currently hosts The Sunova Spiel at East St. Paul on the World Curling Tour.

The facility is currently home to the 2019 Manitoba Scotties Tournament of Hearts championship rink consisting of Tracy Fleury, Selena Njegovan, Liz Fyfe and Kristin MacCuish. It also won the Manitoba Scotties Tournament of Hearts in 1980 and 2016 under the names of Donna Brownridge and Kerri Einarson respectively.
