= Assiniboine Memorial Curling Club =

Canadian curling club

Coordinates: 49°53′36.64″N 97°17′27.0″W

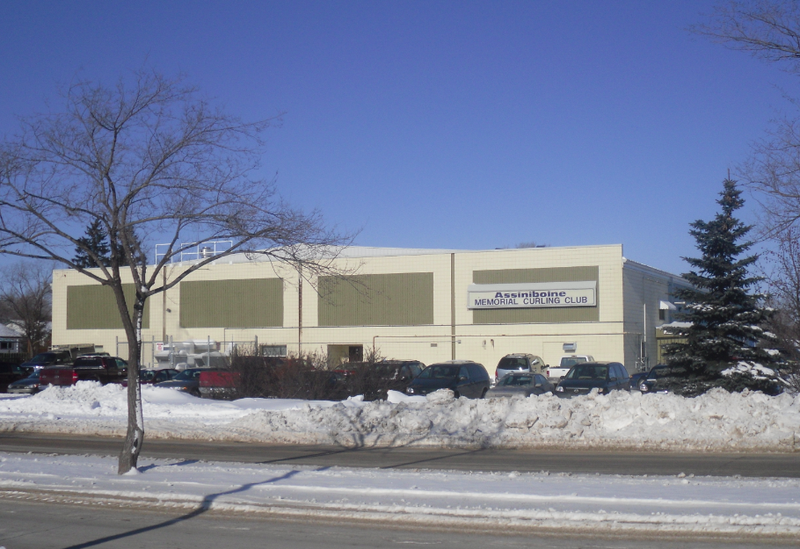
Assiniboine Memorial Curling Club

The Assiniboine Memorial Curling Club is located in the northwestern area of Winnipeg, in the community of St. James. The curling club was started up in 1929 and was nicknamed the 'root cellar', it had only 2 sheets of ice at the time. The AMCC moved to their current site, at Vimy and Hamilton, in 1962. This new location was built with four sheets of ice and then expanded to the current eight it has today. A small fire destroyed part of the clubrooms and arena in 1972, most of the original structure remained and was rebuilt.

In 1992 the AMCC addressed the problem of the shifting Winnipeg 'gumbo' under the ice sheets. The ice was dug out six feet beneath the curling rink, filled with sand, and covered with styrofoam to prevent shifting of the ice.

The AMCC was the home of the 1995 world champion Kerry Burtnyk rink.

== Provincial champions ==
Year	Name	Brier Championships	World Championships
1981	Kerry Burtnyk	(gold) Champions	(bronze) Bronze
1988	Kerry Burtnyk		
1995	Kerry Burtnyk	(gold) Champions	(gold) Gold
2001	Kerry Burtnyk	(silver) Runner-Up	
2008	Kerry Burtnyk		
