= 2020 Canadian Junior Curling Championships – Women's tournament =

2020 Canadian Junior Curling Championships Women's tournament
- Host city: Langley, British Columbia
- Arena: George Preston Recreation Centre; Langley Curling Centre
- Dates: January 18–26
- Winner: Manitoba
- Curling club: Altona Curling Club, Altona, Manitoba
- Skip: Mackenzie Zacharias
- Third: Karlee Burgess
- Second: Emily Zacharias
- Lead: Lauren Lenentine
- Coach: Sheldon Zacharias
- Finalist: Alberta (Marks)

The women's tournament of the 2020 New Holland Canadian Junior Curling Championships was held from January 18 to 26 at the George Preston Recreation Centre and the Langley Curling Centre.

In the final, Mackenzie Zacharias and her rink of Karlee Burgess, Emily Zacharias and Lauren Lenentine out of the Altona Curling Club in Altona, Manitoba capped off a perfect 11–0 record defeating Alberta's Abby Marks rink 10–3 including a score of four in the eighth end. It was a third championship win for Burgess as she also won the title in 2016 and 2018. Team Zacharias represented Canada at the 2020 World Junior Curling Championships in Krasnoyarsk, Russia and won the gold medal.

== Teams ==
The teams are listed as follows:

Province / Territory	Skip	Third	Second	Lead	Alternate	Club(s)
Alberta	Abby Marks	Catherine Clifford	Paige Papley	Jamie Scott		Saville SC, Edmonton
British Columbia	Kaila Buchy	Jaelyn Cotter	Katelyn McGillivray	Cassidy Schwaerzle	Samantha McLaren	Kimberley CC, Kimberley
Manitoba	Mackenzie Zacharias	Karlee Burgess	Emily Zacharias	Lauren Lenentine		Altona CC, Altona
New Brunswick	Melodie Forsythe	Carly Smith	Deanna MacDonald	Caylee Smith	Vanessa Roy	Curl Moncton, Moncton
Newfoundland and Labrador	Mackenzie Mitchell	Katie Follett	Sarah Chaytor	Claire Hartlen		RE/MAX Centre, St. John's
Northern Ontario	Kira Brunton	Lindsay Dubue	Calissa Daly	Jessica Leonard		Curl Sudbury, Sudbury
Northwest Territories	Tyanna Bain	Pearl Gillis	Mataya Gillis	Adrianna Hendrick	Tyra Bain	Inuvik CC, Inuvik
Nova Scotia	Taylour Stevens	Lindsey Burgess	Kate Callaghan	Cate Fitzgerald		Halifax CC, Halifax
Nunavut	Sadie Pinksen	Christianne West	Kaitlin MacDonald	Lena Chown		Iqaluit CC, Iqaluit
Ontario	Sierra Sutherland	Adrienne Belliveau	Chelsea Ferrier	Julie Breton	McKenna McGovern	Rideau CC, Ottawa
Prince Edward Island	Lauren Ferguson	Sydney Howatt	Kristie Rogers	Rachel O'Connor		Cornwall CC, Cornwall
Quebec	Noémie Gauthier	Léandra Roberge	Meaghan Rivett	Florence Boivin	Anna Munroe	CC Kénogami, Jonquière
Saskatchewan	Ashley Thevenot	Rachel Erickson	Paige Engel	Mary Engel		Sutherland CC, Saskatoon
Yukon	Bayly Scoffin	Neizha Snider	Taylor Legge	Dannika Mikkelsen		Whitehorse CC, Whitehorse

== Round-robin standings ==
Final round-robin standings

Key
Teams to Championship pool

Pool A	Skip	W	L
Alberta	Abby Marks	5	1
Ontario	Sierra Sutherland	4	2
Newfoundland and Labrador	Mackenzie Mitchell	4	2
Saskatchewan	Ashley Thevenot	4	2
British Columbia	Kaila Buchy	3	3
Northwest Territories	Tyanna Bain	1	5
Yukon	Bayly Scoffin	0	6

Pool B	Skip	W	L
Manitoba	Mackenzie Zacharias	6	0
Nova Scotia	Taylour Stevens	5	1
New Brunswick	Melodie Forsythe	3	3
Quebec	Noémie Gauthier	3	3
Northern Ontario	Kira Brunton	2	4
Prince Edward Island	Lauren Ferguson	1	5
Nunavut	Sadie Pinksen	1	5

== Round-robin results ==
All draw times are listed in Eastern Standard Time (UTC−5:00).

=== Pool A ===
==== Draw 1 ====
Saturday, January 18, 9:00 am

Sheet D	1	2	3	4	5	6	7	8	9	10	Final
Yukon (Scoffin)	0	1	0	0	0	0	1	0	X	X	2
British Columbia (Buchy) 🔨	5	0	1	1	2	4	0	3	X	X	16

Sheet E	1	2	3	4	5	6	7	8	9	10	11	Final
Alberta (Marks)	0	0	0	0	0	1	1	1	1	0	2	6
Newfoundland and Labrador (Mitchell) 🔨	0	0	0	2	0	0	0	0	0	2	0	4

==== Draw 2 ====
Saturday, January 18, 2:00 pm

Sheet B	1	2	3	4	5	6	7	8	9	10	Final
Saskatchewan (Thevenot)	0	1	0	1	0	3	2	0	2	0	9
Alberta (Marks) 🔨	1	0	2	0	3	0	0	1	0	1	8

Sheet G	1	2	3	4	5	6	7	8	9	10	Final
Northwest Territories (Bain) 🔨	1	2	0	1	0	0	0	1	0	0	5
Ontario (Sutherland)	0	0	2	0	3	0	1	0	0	1	7

==== Draw 3 ====
Saturday, January 18, 7:30 pm

Sheet A	1	2	3	4	5	6	7	8	9	10	Final
British Columbia (Buchy)	0	2	1	1	0	1	0	0	0	0	5
Saskatchewan (Thevenot) 🔨	2	0	0	0	1	0	1	2	1	1	8

Sheet H	1	2	3	4	5	6	7	8	9	10	Final
Ontario (Sutherland)	2	3	2	0	6	4	1	1	X	X	19
Yukon (Scoffin) 🔨	0	0	0	1	0	0	0	0	X	X	1

==== Draw 4 ====
Sunday, January 19, 9:00 am

Sheet C	1	2	3	4	5	6	7	8	9	10	Final
Newfoundland and Labrador (Mitchell) 🔨	0	0	0	2	0	1	0	2	0	1	6
Northwest Territories (Bain)	0	0	0	0	1	0	2	0	0	0	3

==== Draw 5 ====
Sunday, January 19, 2:00 pm

Sheet A	1	2	3	4	5	6	7	8	9	10	Final
Ontario (Sutherland) 🔨	0	0	0	1	0	0	1	0	0	X	2
Alberta (Marks)	1	1	2	0	0	2	0	1	2	X	9

Sheet B	1	2	3	4	5	6	7	8	9	10	Final
British Columbia (Buchy) 🔨	0	1	0	0	0	1	0	0	2	X	4
Newfoundland and Labrador (Mitchell)	1	0	0	2	0	0	2	1	0	X	6

Sheet C	1	2	3	4	5	6	7	8	9	10	Final
Yukon (Scoffin)	0	2	0	1	1	0	1	0	1	0	6
Saskatchewan (Thevenot) 🔨	1	0	3	0	0	1	0	5	0	3	13

==== Draw 6 ====
Sunday, January 19, 7:00 pm

Sheet E	1	2	3	4	5	6	7	8	9	10	Final
Northwest Territories (Bain)	0	0	0	3	0	1	0	1	0	2	7
British Columbia (Buchy) 🔨	1	2	0	0	1	0	2	0	3	0	9

==== Draw 7 ====
Monday, January 20, 9:00 am

Sheet D	1	2	3	4	5	6	7	8	9	10	Final
Newfoundland and Labrador (Mitchell)	0	3	1	0	2	0	1	0	0	X	7
Ontario (Sutherland) 🔨	3	0	0	1	0	3	0	2	1	X	10

Sheet H	1	2	3	4	5	6	7	8	9	10	Final
Saskatchewan (Thevenot) 🔨	0	2	1	0	0	2	3	0	X	X	8
Northwest Territories (Bain)	1	0	0	1	0	0	0	1	X	X	3

==== Draw 8 ====
Monday, January 20, 2:00 pm

Sheet G	1	2	3	4	5	6	7	8	9	10	Final
Alberta (Marks) 🔨	0	4	3	0	0	4	1	2	X	X	14
Yukon (Scoffin)	1	0	0	1	1	0	0	0	X	X	3

==== Draw 9 ====
Monday, January 20, 7:00 pm

Sheet C	1	2	3	4	5	6	7	8	9	10	Final
Ontario (Sutherland)	0	2	0	1	2	0	0	0	0	0	5
British Columbia (Buchy) 🔨	1	0	1	0	0	3	0	1	1	1	8

Sheet D	1	2	3	4	5	6	7	8	9	10	Final
Alberta (Marks)	0	1	0	1	1	2	0	0	2	X	7
Northwest Territories (Bain) 🔨	0	0	0	0	0	0	2	1	0	X	3

==== Draw 10 ====
Tuesday, January 21, 9:00 am

Sheet B	1	2	3	4	5	6	7	8	9	10	Final
Northwest Territories (Bain) 🔨	1	1	0	2	1	0	1	1	3	X	10
Yukon (Scoffin)	0	0	1	0	0	3	0	0	0	X	4

Sheet G	1	2	3	4	5	6	7	8	9	10	Final
Newfoundland and Labrador (Mitchell)	0	3	3	0	3	1	0	1	X	X	11
Saskatchewan (Thevenot) 🔨	1	0	0	1	0	0	1	0	X	X	3

==== Draw 11 ====
Tuesday, January 21, 2:00 pm

Sheet A	1	2	3	4	5	6	7	8	9	10	Final
Yukon (Scoffin) 🔨	0	1	0	1	0	1	0	0	X	X	3
Newfoundland and Labrador (Mitchell)	1	0	1	0	5	0	5	1	X	X	13

Sheet H	1	2	3	4	5	6	7	8	9	10	11	Final
British Columbia (Buchy)	0	0	2	0	0	0	1	0	0	1	0	4
Alberta (Marks) 🔨	0	1	0	0	0	2	0	1	0	0	1	5

==== Draw 12 ====
Tuesday, January 21, 7:00 pm

Sheet E	1	2	3	4	5	6	7	8	9	10	Final
Saskatchewan (Thevenot)	3	2	0	1	0	0	1	0	3	0	10
Ontario (Sutherland) 🔨	0	0	1	0	4	2	0	3	0	1	11

=== Pool B ===
==== Draw 1 ====
Saturday, January 18, 9:00 am

Sheet A	1	2	3	4	5	6	7	8	9	10	Final
Nova Scotia (Stevens) 🔨	0	3	0	0	3	0	1	0	0	2	9
New Brunswick (Forsythe)	0	0	1	1	0	1	0	2	2	0	7

Sheet F	1	2	3	4	5	6	7	8	9	10	Final
Quebec (Gauthier)	0	1	0	0	1	2	0	1	1	1	7
Northern Ontario (Brunton) 🔨	0	0	0	3	0	0	1	0	0	0	4

==== Draw 2 ====
Saturday, January 18, 2:00 pm

Sheet C	1	2	3	4	5	6	7	8	9	10	Final
Manitoba (Zacharias) 🔨	2	0	2	3	0	3	0	0	X	X	10
Prince Edward Island (Ferguson)	0	0	0	0	2	0	1	1	X	X	4

==== Draw 3 ====
Saturday, January 18, 7:30 pm

Sheet D	1	2	3	4	5	6	7	8	9	10	Final
Northern Ontario (Brunton)	1	0	1	0	0	0	1	1	0	X	4
Nova Scotia (Stevens) 🔨	0	2	0	1	1	1	0	0	3	X	8

Sheet E	1	2	3	4	5	6	7	8	9	10	Final
Nunavut (Pinksen)	0	0	0	1	0	0	0	0	X	X	1
Manitoba (Zacharias) 🔨	0	4	0	0	0	4	1	2	X	X	11

==== Draw 4 ====
Sunday, January 19, 9:00 am

Sheet B	1	2	3	4	5	6	7	8	9	10	Final
New Brunswick (Forsythe)	0	0	1	0	0	0	3	0	X	X	4
Nunavut (Pinksen) 🔨	1	1	0	2	2	0	0	3	X	X	9

Sheet G	1	2	3	4	5	6	7	8	9	10	Final
Prince Edward Island (Ferguson)	0	1	1	0	0	0	3	0	1	X	6
Quebec (Gauthier) 🔨	1	0	0	2	4	0	0	2	0	X	9

==== Draw 5 ====
Sunday, January 19, 2:00 pm

Sheet E	1	2	3	4	5	6	7	8	9	10	Final
Prince Edward Island (Ferguson)	0	0	2	1	0	1	0	1	0	X	5
Nova Scotia (Stevens) 🔨	3	1	0	0	1	0	2	0	2	X	9

==== Draw 6 ====
Sunday, January 19, 7:00 pm

Sheet C	1	2	3	4	5	6	7	8	9	10	Final
Northern Ontario (Brunton) 🔨	1	0	0	0	2	1	1	0	2	0	7
New Brunswick (Forsythe)	0	2	2	4	0	0	0	1	0	1	10

Sheet D	1	2	3	4	5	6	7	8	9	10	Final
Manitoba (Zacharias)	0	0	1	2	1	0	2	0	0	X	6
Quebec (Gauthier) 🔨	0	1	0	0	0	2	0	1	0	X	4

==== Draw 7 ====
Monday, January 20, 9:00 am

Sheet G	1	2	3	4	5	6	7	8	9	10	Final
Nunavut (Pinksen) 🔨	1	0	0	0	1	0	2	0	X	X	4
Northern Ontario (Brunton)	0	0	4	1	0	1	0	4	X	X	10

==== Draw 8 ====
Monday, January 20, 2:00 pm

Sheet A	1	2	3	4	5	6	7	8	9	10	11	Final
Quebec (Gauthier) 🔨	3	0	2	0	0	0	2	0	1	0	1	9
Nunavut (Pinksen)	0	1	0	1	1	3	0	1	0	1	0	8

Sheet B	1	2	3	4	5	6	7	8	9	10	Final
Nova Scotia (Stevens) 🔨	0	1	0	0	0	0	3	2	0	0	6
Manitoba (Zacharias)	0	0	2	1	0	2	0	0	0	2	7

Sheet H	1	2	3	4	5	6	7	8	9	10	Final
New Brunswick (Forsythe) 🔨	1	0	2	4	0	1	0	0	0	1	9
Prince Edward Island (Ferguson)	0	2	0	0	2	0	1	1	1	0	7

==== Draw 9 ====
Monday, January 20, 7:00 pm

Sheet E	1	2	3	4	5	6	7	8	9	10	Final
New Brunswick (Forsythe) 🔨	1	0	1	0	1	1	1	0	0	1	6
Quebec (Gauthier)	0	0	0	3	0	0	0	2	0	0	5

==== Draw 10 ====
Tuesday, January 21, 9:00 am

Sheet C	1	2	3	4	5	6	7	8	9	10	Final
Quebec (Gauthier)	0	0	0	0	1	0	1	1	1	0	4
Nova Scotia (Stevens) 🔨	0	2	0	1	0	1	0	0	0	1	5

Sheet D	1	2	3	4	5	6	7	8	9	10	Final
Nunavut (Pinksen) 🔨	0	0	0	0	2	0	1	0	X	X	3
Prince Edward Island (Ferguson)	1	6	0	1	0	2	0	4	X	X	14

==== Draw 11 ====
Tuesday, January 21, 2:00 pm

Sheet B	1	2	3	4	5	6	7	8	9	10	Final
Prince Edward Island (Ferguson)	0	0	0	2	0	0	1	0	0	X	3
Northern Ontario (Brunton) 🔨	0	1	0	0	1	1	0	2	3	X	8

Sheet G	1	2	3	4	5	6	7	8	9	10	Final
Manitoba (Zacharias)	0	0	1	0	2	0	0	3	0	1	7
New Brunswick (Forsythe) 🔨	0	1	0	1	0	1	1	0	1	0	5

==== Draw 12 ====
Tuesday, January 21, 7:00 pm

Sheet A	1	2	3	4	5	6	7	8	9	10	Final
Northern Ontario (Brunton) 🔨	0	0	0	2	0	2	0	0	2	X	6
Manitoba (Zacharias)	0	0	3	0	1	0	2	3	0	X	9

Sheet F	1	2	3	4	5	6	7	8	9	10	Final
Nova Scotia (Stevens)	2	0	4	0	2	0	0	4	X	X	12
Nunavut (Pinksen) 🔨	0	1	0	1	0	1	1	0	X	X	4

== Placement round ==
=== Seeding pool ===
==== Standings ====
Final Seeding Pool Standings

Team	Skip	W	L
Northern Ontario	Kira Brunton	5	4
British Columbia	Kaila Buchy	5	4
Prince Edward Island	Lauren Ferguson	3	6
Northwest Territories	Tyanna Bain	2	7
Nunavut	Sadie Pinksen	2	7
Yukon	Bayly Scoffin	0	9

==== Draw 14 ====
Wednesday, January 22, 2:00 pm

Sheet C	1	2	3	4	5	6	7	8	9	10	Final
British Columbia (Buchy)	0	0	0	0	2	0	2	0	1	0	5
Northern Ontario (Brunton) 🔨	0	1	0	2	0	1	0	2	0	1	7

Sheet H	1	2	3	4	5	6	7	8	9	10	Final
Northwest Territories (Bain)	2	1	0	0	0	0	4	0	2	X	9
Nunavut (Pinksen) 🔨	0	0	0	1	2	2	0	2	0	X	7

==== Draw 15 ====
Wednesday, January 22, 7:00 pm

Sheet C	1	2	3	4	5	6	7	8	9	10	Final
Nunavut (Pinksen)	2	0	2	2	0	2	0	0	3	X	11
Yukon (Scoffin) 🔨	0	1	0	0	2	0	2	1	0	X	6

Sheet F	1	2	3	4	5	6	7	8	9	10	Final
Prince Edward Island (Ferguson) 🔨	0	0	2	0	2	0	2	1	0	X	7
British Columbia (Buchy)	1	3	0	2	0	3	0	0	2	X	11

==== Draw 16 ====
Thursday, January 23, 9:00 am

Sheet B	1	2	3	4	5	6	7	8	9	10	Final
Northern Ontario (Brunton) 🔨	0	0	2	2	2	1	0	3	X	X	10
Northwest Territories (Bain)	0	0	0	0	0	0	1	0	X	X	1

==== Draw 17 ====
Thursday, January 23, 2:00 pm

Sheet C	1	2	3	4	5	6	7	8	9	10	Final
Northwest Territories (Bain) 🔨	0	0	0	2	0	0	0	0	0	X	2
Prince Edward Island (Ferguson)	1	0	1	0	2	0	0	1	2	X	7

Sheet G	1	2	3	4	5	6	7	8	9	10	Final
Yukon (Scoffin)	1	0	1	0	0	1	0	0	X	X	3
Northern Ontario (Brunton) 🔨	0	5	0	0	4	0	0	1	X	X	10

==== Draw 18 ====
Thursday, January 23, 7:00 pm

Sheet F	1	2	3	4	5	6	7	8	9	10	Final
British Columbia (Buchy)	4	0	2	0	0	0	0	1	X	X	7
Nunavut (Pinksen) 🔨	0	0	0	1	0	0	1	0	X	X	2

==== Draw 20 ====
Friday, January 24, 2:00 pm

Sheet B	1	2	3	4	5	6	7	8	9	10	Final
Yukon (Scoffin) 🔨	0	0	0	1	0	1	0	1	X	X	3
Prince Edward Island (Ferguson)	3	1	6	0	2	0	2	0	X	X	14

=== Championship pool ===
==== Championship pool standings ====
Final Championship Pool Standings

Key
Teams to Playoffs
Teams to Tiebreakers

Province	Skip	W	L
Manitoba	Mackenzie Zacharias	10	0
Nova Scotia	Taylour Stevens	8	2
New Brunswick	Melodie Forsythe	6	4
Alberta	Abby Marks	6	4
Quebec	Noémie Gauthier	6	4
Ontario	Sierra Sutherland	5	5
Saskatchewan	Ashley Thevenot	5	5
Newfoundland and Labrador	Mackenzie Mitchell	4	6

==== Draw 14 ====
Wednesday, January 22, 2:00 pm

Sheet E	1	2	3	4	5	6	7	8	9	10	Final
Nova Scotia (Stevens)	2	1	1	1	0	4	0	3	X	X	12
Alberta (Marks) 🔨	0	0	0	0	1	0	2	0	X	X	3

Sheet F	1	2	3	4	5	6	7	8	9	10	Final
Manitoba (Zacharias) 🔨	0	1	0	0	4	1	2	0	X	X	8
Ontario (Sutherland)	1	0	0	1	0	0	0	1	X	X	3

==== Draw 15 ====
Wednesday, January 22, 7:00 pm

Sheet B	1	2	3	4	5	6	7	8	9	10	Final
Quebec (Gauthier)	0	3	0	1	0	0	4	1	X	X	9
Saskatchewan (Thevenot) 🔨	1	0	1	0	0	1	0	0	X	X	3

Sheet G	1	2	3	4	5	6	7	8	9	10	Final
Newfoundland and Labrador (Mitchell)	0	0	2	0	1	0	0	0	1	1	5
New Brunswick (Forsythe) 🔨	1	1	0	1	0	0	2	1	0	0	6

==== Draw 16 ====
Thursday, January 23, 9:00 am

Sheet C	1	2	3	4	5	6	7	8	9	10	Final
Alberta (Marks)	0	1	0	2	1	0	0	0	1	0	5
New Brunswick (Forsythe) 🔨	1	0	1	0	0	0	2	0	0	2	6

Sheet D	1	2	3	4	5	6	7	8	9	10	Final
Saskatchewan (Thevenot)	0	1	1	0	0	0	2	0	X	X	4
Manitoba (Zacharias) 🔨	3	0	0	3	1	1	0	2	X	X	10

Sheet H	1	2	3	4	5	6	7	8	9	10	Final
Ontario (Sutherland) 🔨	2	1	0	2	0	1	0	1	0	0	7
Nova Scotia (Stevens)	0	0	1	0	2	0	1	0	1	0	5

==== Draw 17 ====
Thursday, January 23, 2:00 pm

Sheet A	1	2	3	4	5	6	7	8	9	10	Final
Ontario (Sutherland) 🔨	2	0	1	0	0	0	1	1	0	X	5
Quebec (Gauthier)	0	1	0	1	2	2	0	0	4	X	10

Sheet E	1	2	3	4	5	6	7	8	9	10	Final
Manitoba (Zacharias) 🔨	0	2	0	3	0	2	0	5	X	X	12
Newfoundland and Labrador (Mitchell)	0	0	1	0	1	0	2	0	X	X	4

==== Draw 18 ====
Thursday, January 23, 7:00 pm

Sheet D	1	2	3	4	5	6	7	8	9	10	Final
Nova Scotia (Stevens) 🔨	0	1	0	2	1	0	4	0	0	X	8
Newfoundland and Labrador (Mitchell)	1	0	2	0	0	1	0	1	0	X	5

Sheet E	1	2	3	4	5	6	7	8	9	10	Final
New Brunswick (Forsythe) 🔨	1	0	2	0	1	0	1	0	1	0	6
Saskatchewan (Thevenot)	0	1	0	1	0	2	0	3	0	1	8

Sheet G	1	2	3	4	5	6	7	8	9	10	Final
Quebec (Gauthier)	0	0	2	0	0	1	0	0	X	X	3
Alberta (Marks) 🔨	0	1	0	1	2	0	0	3	X	X	7

==== Draw 19 ====
Friday, January 24, 9:00 am

Sheet A	1	2	3	4	5	6	7	8	9	10	Final
Saskatchewan (Thevenot)	1	0	1	2	0	2	0	2	0	0	8
Nova Scotia (Stevens) 🔨	0	3	0	0	1	0	2	0	3	2	11

Sheet B	1	2	3	4	5	6	7	8	9	10	Final
Alberta (Marks) 🔨	2	0	0	1	0	1	0	3	0	0	7
Manitoba (Zacharias)	0	2	2	0	2	0	1	0	0	1	8

Sheet D	1	2	3	4	5	6	7	8	9	10	11	Final
New Brunswick (Forsythe) 🔨	0	1	0	1	1	1	1	0	1	0	1	7
Ontario (Sutherland)	0	0	2	0	0	0	0	3	0	1	0	6

Sheet H	1	2	3	4	5	6	7	8	9	10	Final
Newfoundland and Labrador (Mitchell)	0	0	0	2	0	0	2	0	0	X	4
Quebec (Gauthier) 🔨	0	0	1	0	2	1	0	1	3	X	8

== Tiebreakers ==
Friday, January 24, 2:00 pm

Sheet E	1	2	3	4	5	6	7	8	9	10	Final
Alberta (Marks) 🔨	1	1	1	1	1	3	X	X	X	X	8
Quebec (Gauthier)	0	0	0	0	0	0	X	X	X	X	0

Player percentages
Alberta		Quebec	
Jamie Scott	63%	Florence Boivin	75%
Paige Papley	69%	Meaghan Rivett	79%
Catherine Clifford	88%	Léandra Roberge	65%
Abby Marks	92%	Noémie Gauthier	56%
Total	78%	Total	69%

Saturday, January 25, 11:00 am

Sheet E	1	2	3	4	5	6	7	8	9	10	Final
New Brunswick (Forsythe) 🔨	1	0	1	0	1	0	0	0	X	X	3
Alberta (Marks)	0	2	0	2	0	1	2	3	X	X	10

Player percentages
New Brunswick		Alberta	
Caylee Smith	69%	Jamie Scott	67%
Deanna MacDonald	44%	Paige Papley	77%
Carly Smith	80%	Catherine Clifford	77%
Melodie Forsythe	44%	Abby Marks	72%
Total	61%	Total	73%

== Playoffs ==
Semifinal			Final
			1	Manitoba	10
2	Nova Scotia	5	3	Alberta	3
3	Alberta	6

=== Semifinal ===
Saturday, January 25, 4:00 pm

Sheet C	1	2	3	4	5	6	7	8	9	10	11	Final
Nova Scotia (Stevens) 🔨	1	1	0	0	2	0	0	0	0	1	0	5
Alberta (Marks)	0	0	3	1	0	0	0	0	1	0	1	6

Player percentages
Nova Scotia		Alberta	
Cate Fitzgerald	77%	Jamie Scott	82%
Kate Callaghan	75%	Paige Papley	77%
Lindsey Burgess	80%	Catherine Clifford	74%
Taylour Stevens	55%	Abby Marks	69%
Total	72%	Total	76%

=== Final ===
Sunday, January 26, 9:00 am

Sheet C	1	2	3	4	5	6	7	8	9	10	Final
Manitoba (Zacharias) 🔨	2	0	1	0	0	1	0	4	2	X	10
Alberta (Marks)	0	1	0	1	0	0	1	0	0	X	3

Player percentages
Manitoba		Alberta	
Lauren Lenentine	81%	Jamie Scott	86%
Emily Zacharias	86%	Paige Papley	74%
Karlee Burgess	88%	Catherine Clifford	75%
Mackenzie Zacharias	89%	Abby Marks	69%
Total	86%	Total	76%
