= 2022 Best of the West =

2022 SGI Canada Best of the West
- Host city: Saskatoon, Saskatchewan
- Arena: Nutana Curling Club
- Dates: April 22–24
- Men's winner: Saskatchewan 1
- Curling club: Sutherland CC, Saskatoon
- Skip: Rylan Kleiter
- Third: Joshua Mattern
- Second: Trevor Johnson
- Lead: Matthieu Taillon
- Coach: Dean Kleiter
- Finalist: Manitoba 1 (Lott)
- Women's winner: British Columbia 1
- Curling club: Kamloops CC, Kamloops
- Skip: Corryn Brown
- Third: Erin Pincott
- Second: Rachel Erickson
- Lead: Samantha Fisher
- Coach: Allison MacInnes
- Finalist: Manitoba 2 (Peterson)
- Doubles winner: Saskatchewan M
- Teammate 1: Sam Wills
- Teammate 2: Garret Springer
- Finalist: Alberta W (Rocque / Schmiemann)

The 2022 SGI Canada Best of the West was held from April 22 to 24 at the Nutana Curling Club in Saskatoon, Saskatchewan. The newly created event consisted of teams with all players thirty years and younger. It was played between the four provinces of Western Canada, British Columbia, Alberta, Saskatchewan and Manitoba. All provinces were represented by two teams in each of the three disciplines, men's, women's and doubles.

== Format ==
The Best of the West U30 Championship was played in a round-robin tournament with two pools of four in each of the three disciplines, men's, women's and doubles. The top two teams in each pool at the conclusion of the three game round robin advanced to the semifinal round, with the winners then moving on to the championship game.

== Men ==
=== Teams ===
The teams are listed as follows:

Province	Skip	Third	Second	Lead	Locale
Alberta 1	Karsten Sturmay	Tristan Steinke	Chris Kennedy	Glenn Venance	Edmonton
Alberta 2	Jeremy Harty	Kyler Kleibrink	Joshua Kiist	Kurtis Goller	Calgary
British Columbia 1	Tyler Tardi	Sterling Middleton	Jason Ginter	Jordan Tardi	Langley
British Columbia 2	Matthew McCrady	Alex Horvath	Brayden Carpenter	Logan Miron	New Westminster
Manitoba 1	Colton Lott	Tanner Lott	Kyle Doering	Emerson Klimpke	Winnipeg
Manitoba 2	Braden Calvert	Kyle Kurz	Ian McMillan	Rob Gordon	Winnipeg
Saskatchewan 1	Rylan Kleiter	Joshua Mattern	Trevor Johnson	Matthieu Taillon	Saskatoon
Saskatchewan 2	Brady Scharback	Brayden Stewart	Dustin Mikush	Jared Latos	Saskatoon

=== Round-robin standings ===
Final round-robin standings

Key
Teams to Playoffs
Teams to Tiebreaker

Pool A	Skip	W	L	PF	PA
Saskatchewan 1	Rylan Kleiter	3	0	20	13
Manitoba 1	Colton Lott	2	1	15	13
British Columbia 2	Matthew McCrady	1	2	14	20
Alberta 2	Jeremy Harty	0	3	16	19

Pool B	Skip	W	L	PF	PA
British Columbia 1	Tyler Tardi	2	1	15	10
Alberta 1	Karsten Sturmay	2	1	17	13
Manitoba 2	Braden Calvert	2	1	20	17
Saskatchewan 2	Brady Scharback	0	3	11	23

=== Round-robin results ===
All draw times are listed in Mountain Time (UTC−06:00).

==== Draw 2 ====
Friday, April 22, 12:30 pm

Sheet 2	1	2	3	4	5	6	7	8	Final
Alberta 2 (Harty)	0	2	0	3	0	1	1	0	7
British Columbia 2 (McCrady) 🔨	1	0	3	0	3	0	0	1	8

Sheet 3	1	2	3	4	5	6	7	8	Final
British Columbia 1 (Tardi) 🔨	0	1	0	1	0	1	2	X	5
Saskatchewan 2 (Scharback)	0	0	2	0	0	0	0	X	2

Sheet 4	1	2	3	4	5	6	7	8	Final
Manitoba 1 (Lott) 🔨	1	0	2	0	1	0	0	0	4
Saskatchewan 1 (Kleiter)	0	1	0	2	0	2	1	1	7

Sheet 7	1	2	3	4	5	6	7	8	Final
Alberta 1 (Sturmay)	1	1	0	0	3	0	2	X	7
Manitoba 2 (Calvert) 🔨	0	0	1	0	0	3	0	X	4

==== Draw 4 ====
Friday, April 22, 8:30 pm

Sheet 1	1	2	3	4	5	6	7	8	Final
Manitoba 1 (Lott) 🔨	3	2	0	1	0	X	X	X	6
British Columbia 2 (McCrady)	0	0	1	0	1	X	X	X	2

Sheet 4	1	2	3	4	5	6	7	8	Final
British Columbia 1 (Tardi)	0	3	0	1	2	0	X	X	6
Alberta 1 (Sturmay) 🔨	1	0	0	0	0	1	X	X	2

Sheet 5	1	2	3	4	5	6	7	8	Final
Manitoba 2 (Calvert) 🔨	2	0	0	0	3	1	0	4	10
Saskatchewan 2 (Scharback)	0	3	1	0	0	0	2	0	6

Sheet 7	1	2	3	4	5	6	7	8	Final
Saskatchewan 1 (Kleiter) 🔨	2	0	1	0	0	2	0	1	6
Alberta 2 (Harty)	0	2	0	2	0	0	1	0	5

==== Draw 5 ====
Saturday, April 23, 8:30 am

Sheet 2	1	2	3	4	5	6	7	8	Final
British Columbia 1 (Tardi)	0	1	0	0	2	0	1	X	4
Manitoba 2 (Calvert) 🔨	1	0	1	1	0	2	0	1	6

Sheet 3	1	2	3	4	5	6	7	8	Final
Manitoba 1 (Lott) 🔨	1	0	2	0	1	0	0	1	5
Alberta 2 (Harty)	0	1	0	2	0	1	0	0	4

Sheet 5	1	2	3	4	5	6	7	8	Final
Saskatchewan 1 (Kleiter) 🔨	2	0	2	2	0	1	0	X	7
British Columbia 2 (McCrady)	0	2	0	0	1	0	1	X	4

Sheet 7	1	2	3	4	5	6	7	8	Final
Saskatchewan 2 (Scharback)	0	0	1	0	1	1	0	0	3
Alberta 1 (Sturmay) 🔨	2	1	0	1	0	0	2	2	8

=== Tiebreaker ===
Saturday, April 23, 4:30 pm

Sheet 7	1	2	3	4	5	6	7	8	Final
Alberta 1 (Sturmay) 🔨	3	1	1	0	0	2	X	X	7
Manitoba 2 (Calvert)	0	0	0	1	0	0	X	X	1

=== Playoffs ===
Semifinals
A1	Saskatchewan 1	5
B2	Alberta 1	3
B1	British Columbia 1	5
A2	Manitoba 1	8

Final
A1	Saskatchewan 1	9
A2	Manitoba 1	8

==== Semifinals ====
Saturday, April 23, 8:30 pm

Sheet 3	1	2	3	4	5	6	7	8	Final
Saskatchewan 1 (Kleiter) 🔨	1	0	0	1	1	1	0	1	5
Alberta 1 (Sturmay)	0	0	1	0	0	0	2	0	3

Sheet 4	1	2	3	4	5	6	7	8	Final
British Columbia 1 (Tardi) 🔨	3	0	0	0	0	2	0	X	5
Manitoba 1 (Lott)	0	2	1	1	1	0	3	X	8

==== Final ====
Sunday, April 24, 4:30 pm

Sheet 7	1	2	3	4	5	6	7	8	9	Final
Saskatchewan 1 (Kleiter) 🔨	1	0	3	0	1	0	3	0	1	9
Manitoba 1 (Lott)	0	1	0	2	0	2	0	3	0	8

== Women ==
=== Teams ===
The teams are listed as follows:

Province	Skip	Third	Second	Lead	Locale
Alberta 1	Kayla Skrlik	Selena Sturmay	Brittany Tran	Ashton Skrlik	Calgary
Alberta 2	Marla Sherrer	Chantele Broderson	Julie Selvais	Sarah Drummond	Lacombe
British Columbia 1	Corryn Brown	Erin Pincott	Rachel Erickson	Samantha Fisher	Kamloops
British Columbia 2	Kayla MacMillan	Lindsay Dubue	Kalia Mackenzie	Sarah Loken	Vancouver
Manitoba 1	Mackenzie Zacharias	Karlee Burgess	Emily Zacharias	Lauren Lenentine	Altona
Manitoba 2	Beth Peterson	Laura Burtnyk	Katherine Doerksen	Melissa Gordon	Winnipeg
Saskatchewan 1	Kourtney Fesser	Krista Fesser	Karlee Korchinski	Kaylin Skinner	Saskatoon
Saskatchewan 2	Lorraine Schneider	Jennifer Armstrong	Ashley Williamson	Amanda Kuzyk	Regina

=== Round-robin standings ===
Final round-robin standings

Key
Teams to Playoffs

Pool A	Skip	W	L	PF	PA
British Columbia 2	Kayla MacMillan	2	1	14	19
Manitoba 1	Mackenzie Zacharias	2	1	16	13
Alberta 2	Marla Sherrer	1	2	16	12
Saskatchewan 1	Kourtney Fesser	1	2	16	18

Pool B	Skip	W	L	PF	PA
British Columbia 1	Corryn Brown	2	1	18	15
Manitoba 2	Beth Peterson	2	1	21	17
Alberta 1	Kayla Skrlik	1	2	12	17
Saskatchewan 2	Lorraine Schneider	1	2	16	18

=== Round-robin results ===
All draw times are listed in Mountain Time (UTC−06:00).

==== Draw 1 ====
Friday, April 22, 8:30 am

Sheet 1	1	2	3	4	5	6	7	8	Final
Alberta 2 (Sherrer)	0	0	1	0	0	1	2	0	4
British Columbia 2 (MacMillan) 🔨	0	2	0	1	1	0	0	1	5

Sheet 3	1	2	3	4	5	6	7	8	Final
Saskatchewan 2 (Schneider) 🔨	0	0	2	0	0	1	1	0	4
Manitoba 2 (Peterson)	0	1	0	2	1	0	0	4	8

Sheet 4	1	2	3	4	5	6	7	8	Final
Alberta 1 (Skrlik) 🔨	0	0	0	0	0	1	X	X	1
British Columbia 1 (Brown)	0	1	3	1	1	0	X	X	6

Sheet 7	1	2	3	4	5	6	7	8	Final
Manitoba 1 (Zacharias) 🔨	2	0	0	1	3	1	0	X	7
Saskatchewan 1 (Fesser)	0	1	0	0	0	0	2	X	3

==== Draw 3 ====
Friday, April 22, 4:30 pm

Sheet 2	1	2	3	4	5	6	7	8	Final
British Columbia 2 (MacMillan) 🔨	0	1	1	0	1	1	0	1	5
Manitoba 1 (Zacharias)	1	0	0	2	0	0	0	0	3

Sheet 3	1	2	3	4	5	6	7	8	Final
Saskatchewan 1 (Fesser)	0	1	0	0	0	0	X	X	1
Alberta 2 (Sherrer) 🔨	0	0	2	2	2	1	X	X	7

Sheet 5	1	2	3	4	5	6	7	8	Final
Alberta 1 (Skrlik)	1	0	0	1	0	2	0	0	4
Saskatchewan 2 (Schneider) 🔨	0	0	0	0	1	0	1	1	3

Sheet 7	1	2	3	4	5	6	7	8	Final
British Columbia 1 (Brown) 🔨	0	2	0	0	0	1	0	3	6
Manitoba 2 (Peterson)	0	0	2	0	1	0	2	0	5

==== Draw 6 ====
Saturday, April 23, 12:30 pm

Sheet 1	1	2	3	4	5	6	7	8	Final
Alberta 1 (Skrlik)	0	0	3	0	0	2	1	1	7
Manitoba 2 (Peterson) 🔨	2	2	0	0	4	0	0	0	8

Sheet 2	1	2	3	4	5	6	7	8	9	Final
British Columbia 1 (Brown)	0	1	0	2	0	0	2	1	0	6
Saskatchewan 2 (Schneider) 🔨	2	0	1	0	3	0	0	0	3	9

Sheet 4	1	2	3	4	5	6	7	8	Final
Saskatchewan 1 (Fesser)	0	1	3	0	3	5	X	X	12
British Columbia 2 (MacMillan) 🔨	2	0	0	2	0	0	X	X	4

Sheet 7	1	2	3	4	5	6	7	8	9	Final
Alberta 2 (Sherrer)	0	0	0	0	1	0	3	1	0	5
Manitoba 1 (Zacharias) 🔨	0	1	1	2	0	1	0	0	1	6

=== Playoffs ===
Semifinals
A1	British Columbia 2	5
B2	Manitoba 2	8
B1	British Columbia 1	6
A2	Manitoba 1	3

Final
B2	Manitoba 2	3
B1	British Columbia 1	5

==== Semifinals ====
Saturday, April 23, 8:30 pm

Sheet 5	1	2	3	4	5	6	7	8	Final
British Columbia 1 (Brown)	0	1	0	1	2	1	0	1	6
Manitoba 1 (Zacharias) 🔨	0	0	2	0	0	0	1	0	3

Sheet 7	1	2	3	4	5	6	7	8	Final
British Columbia 2 (MacMillan) 🔨	0	1	0	0	3	1	0	0	5
Manitoba 2 (Peterson)	1	0	1	2	0	0	2	2	8

==== Final ====
Sunday, April 24, 12:00 pm

Sheet 7	1	2	3	4	5	6	7	8	Final
Manitoba 2 (Peterson)	0	0	0	1	0	1	1	0	3
British Columbia 1 (Brown) 🔨	0	1	0	0	3	0	0	1	5

== Doubles ==
=== Teams ===
The teams are listed as follows:

Province	Teammate 1	Teammate 2
Alberta M	Evan van Amsterdam	Gregg Hamilton
Alberta W	Kelsey Rocque	Danielle Schmiemann
British Columbia M	Daniel Wenzek	Nicholas Meister
British Columbia W	Taylor Reese-Hansen	Cierra Fisher
Manitoba M	Jacques Gauthier	Ryan Wiebe
Manitoba W	Tansy Tober	Stephanie Feeleus
Saskatchewan M	Sam Wills	Garret Springer
Saskatchewan W	Chaelynn Kitz	Madison Kleiter

=== Round-robin standings ===
Final round-robin standings

Key
Teams to Finals

Men	Team	W	L	PF	PA
Alberta M	van Amsterdam / Hamilton	3	0	25	16
Saskatchewan M	Wills / Springer	2	1	19	18
British Columbia M	Wenzek / Meister	1	2	17	17
Manitoba M	Gauthier / Wiebe	0	3	10	20

Women	Team	W	L	PF	PA
Alberta W	Rocque / Schmiemann	3	0	26	9
British Columbia W	Reese-Hansen / Fisher	2	1	19	21
Saskatchewan W	Kitz / Kleiter	1	2	17	25
Manitoba W	Tober / Feeleus	0	3	17	24

=== Round-robin results ===
All draw times are listed in Mountain Time (UTC−06:00).

==== Draw 1 ====
Friday, April 22, 8:30 am

Sheet 2	1	2	3	4	5	6	7	8	Final
Saskatchewan W (Kitz / Kleiter) 🔨	2	0	2	0	1	0	3	1	9
Manitoba W (Tober / Feeleus)	0	2	0	2	0	3	0	0	7

Sheet 5	1	2	3	4	5	6	7	8	Final
Alberta W (Rocque / Schmiemann) 🔨	2	2	0	0	4	2	X	X	10
British Columbia W (Reese-Hansen / Fisher)	0	0	1	1	0	0	X	X	2

==== Draw 2 ====
Friday, April 22, 12:30 pm

Sheet 1	1	2	3	4	5	6	7	8	9	Final
Alberta M (van Amsterdam / Hamilton) 🔨	1	0	2	0	1	0	2	0	3	9
British Columbia M (Wenzek / Meister)	0	2	0	1	0	1	0	2	0	6

Sheet 5	1	2	3	4	5	6	7	8	Final
Saskatchewan M (Wills / Springer)	3	0	2	1	2	0	X	X	8
Manitoba M (Gauthier / Wiebe) 🔨	0	1	0	0	0	2	X	X	3

==== Draw 3 ====
Friday, April 22, 4:30 pm

Sheet 1	1	2	3	4	5	6	7	8	Final
Alberta W (Rocque / Schmiemann)	1	0	2	2	2	0	2	X	9
Saskatchewan W (Kitz / Kleiter) 🔨	0	1	0	0	0	2	0	X	3

Sheet 4	1	2	3	4	5	6	7	8	Final
Manitoba W (Tober / Feeleus)	0	0	1	0	0	4	1	X	6
British Columbia W (Reese-Hansen / Fisher) 🔨	5	1	0	1	1	0	0	X	8

==== Draw 4 ====
Friday, April 22, 8:30 pm

Sheet 2	1	2	3	4	5	6	7	8	Final
Alberta M (van Amsterdam / Hamilton) 🔨	3	0	5	0	3	0	0	X	11
Saskatchewan M (Wills / Springer)	0	1	0	2	0	2	1	X	6

Sheet 3	1	2	3	4	5	6	7	8	Final
British Columbia M (Wenzek / Meister)	0	2	1	1	0	2	1	X	7
Manitoba M (Gauthier / Wiebe) 🔨	2	0	0	0	1	0	0	X	3

==== Draw 5 ====
Saturday, April 23, 8:30 am

Sheet 1	1	2	3	4	5	6	7	8	9	Final
British Columbia M (Wenzek / Meister)	0	1	0	0	1	1	0	1	0	4
Saskatchewan M (Wills / Springer) 🔨	1	0	1	1	0	0	1	0	1	5

Sheet 4	1	2	3	4	5	6	7	8	Final
Alberta M (van Amsterdam / Hamilton) 🔨	0	2	0	1	1	0	0	1	5
Manitoba M (Gauthier / Wiebe)	1	0	1	0	0	1	1	0	4

==== Draw 6 ====
Saturday, April 23, 12:30 pm

Sheet 3	1	2	3	4	5	6	7	8	Final
Saskatchewan W (Kitz / Kleiter)	0	2	0	1	0	2	0	0	5
British Columbia W (Reese-Hansen / Fisher) 🔨	3	0	2	0	2	0	1	1	9

Sheet 5	1	2	3	4	5	6	7	8	Final
Alberta W (Rocque / Schmiemann) 🔨	2	0	2	0	3	0	0	X	7
Manitoba W (Tober / Feeleus)	0	1	0	1	0	1	1	X	4

=== Playoffs ===
Semifinals
M1	Alberta M	5
M2	Saskatchewan M	6
W1	Alberta W	8
W2	British Columbia W	0

Final
M2	Saskatchewan M	7
W1	Alberta W	6

==== Semifinals ====
Saturday, April 23, 8:30 pm

Sheet 1	1	2	3	4	5	6	7	8	Final
Alberta W (Rocque / Schmiemann) 🔨	1	1	1	1	2	2	X	X	8
British Columbia W (Reese-Hansen / Fisher)	0	0	0	0	0	0	X	X	0

Sheet 2	1	2	3	4	5	6	7	8	Final
Alberta M (van Amsterdam / Hamilton) 🔨	2	1	0	1	1	0	0	0	5
Saskatchewan M (Wills / Springer)	0	0	1	0	0	3	1	1	6

==== Final ====
Sunday, April 24, 9:00 am

Sheet 7	1	2	3	4	5	6	7	8	9	Final
Saskatchewan M (Wills / Springer)	1	0	0	2	1	1	1	0	1	7
Alberta W (Rocque / Schmiemann) 🔨	0	2	1	0	0	0	0	3	0	6
