= 2022 Scotties Tournament of Hearts =

Canada's women's curling championship

- Host city: Thunder Bay, Ontario
- Arena: Fort William Gardens
- Dates: January 28 – February 6
- Winner: Canada
- Curling club: Gimli CC, Gimli, Manitoba
- Skip: Kerri Einarson
- Third: Val Sweeting
- Second: Shannon Birchard
- Lead: Briane Meilleur
- Alternate: Krysten Karwacki
- Coach: Reid Carruthers
- Finalist: Northern Ontario (Krista McCarville)

The 2022 Scotties Tournament of Hearts, Canada's national women's curling championship, was held from January 28 to February 6 at the Fort William Gardens in Thunder Bay, Ontario. The winning team represented Canada at the 2022 World Women's Curling Championship at the CN Centre in Prince George, British Columbia.

Due to the COVID-19 pandemic and Ontario public health orders, the tournament was held behind closed doors with no public spectators for the second season in a row. As Ontario began to permit a maximum capacity of 500 spectators at indoor sporting events beginning January 31, Curling Canada explored admitting limited public spectators for the playoff draws, but ultimately decided against doing so. Organizers later invited tournament volunteers and junior curlers from the Thunder Bay area to attend the playoff draws.

== Teams ==
Due to COVID-19 pandemic-related concerns, and public health orders in multiple provinces that prohibited sports tournaments, the provincial and territorial playdowns in New Brunswick, Newfoundland and Labrador, Northwest Territories, Ontario (both Ontario and Northern Ontario), Prince Edward Island, and Quebec were cancelled (or in the case of Ontario, postponed until April), with teams being selected by provincial sanctioning bodies.

Canada	Alberta	British Columbia
Gimli CC, Gimli Skip: Kerri Einarson; Third: Val Sweeting; Second: Shannon Birchard; Lead: Briane Meilleur (Note: Team Canada's alternate Krysten Karwacki threw lead stones for the last end of Draw 8.); Alternate: Krysten Karwacki	Saville SC, Edmonton Skip: Laura Walker; Third: Kate Cameron; Second: Taylor McDonald (Note: Team Alberta's alternate Dana Ferguson threw second stones for the last end of Draw 8 and second stones for the last two ends of Draw 10.); Lead: Nadine Scotland; Alternate: Dana Ferguson	Kelowna CC, Kelowna Skip: Mary-Anne Arsenault; Third: Jeanna Schraeder; Second: Sasha Carter; Lead: Renee Simons (Note: Team British Columbia's alternate Morgan Muise threw lead stones during Draw 16.); Alternate: Morgan Muise
Manitoba	New Brunswick	Newfoundland and Labrador
Altona CC, Altona Skip: Mackenzie Zacharias; Third: Karlee Burgess; Second: Emily Zacharias; Lead: Lauren Lenentine; Alternate: Lori Olson-Johns	Capital WC, Fredericton Skip: Andrea Crawford; Third: Sylvie Quillian; Second: Jillian Babin; Lead: Katie Forward	St. John's CC, St. John's Skip: Sarah Hill; Third: Kelli Sharpe; Second: Beth Hamilton; Lead: Adrienne Mercer; Alternate: Laura Phillips
Northern Ontario	Nova Scotia	Ontario
Fort William CC, Thunder Bay Skip: Krista McCarville; Third: Kendra Lilly; Second: Ashley Sippala; Lead: Sarah Potts; Alternate: Jen Gates	Dartmouth CC, Dartmouth Skip: Christina Black; Third: Jenn Baxter; Second: Karlee Everist; Lead: Shelley Barker; Alternate: Carole MacLean	Woodstock CC, Woodstock Skip: Hollie Duncan; Third: Megan Balsdon; Second: Rachelle Strybosch (Note: Team Ontario's alternate Julie Tippin threw second stones during Draw 12.); Lead: Tess Bobbie; Alternate: Julie Tippin
Prince Edward Island	Quebec	Saskatchewan
Montague CC, Montague & Cornwall CC, Cornwall Skip: Suzanne Birt; Third: Marie Christianson; Second: Meaghan Hughes; Lead: Michelle McQuaid; Alternate: Kathy O'Rourke	CC Laval-sur-le-Lac, Laval & Glenmore CC, Dollard-des-Ormeaux Skip: Laurie St-Georges; Third: Hailey Armstrong (Note: Team Quebec's alternate Alanna Routledge threw lead stones during Draw 4 and third stones for the last five ends of Draw 6.); Second: Emily Riley; Lead: Cynthia St-Georges; Alternate: Alanna Routledge	Moose Jaw Ford CC, Moose Jaw Skip: Penny Barker; Third: Christie Gamble; Second: Jenna Enge; Lead: Danielle Sicinski; Alternate: Amber Holland
Northwest Territories	Nunavut	Yukon
Yellowknife CC, Yellowknife Fourth: Jo-Ann Rizzo; Third: Sarah Koltun; Second: Margot Flemming; Skip: Kerry Galusha; Alternate: Megan Koehler	Iqaluit CC, Iqaluit Skip: Brigitte MacPhail; Third: Sadie Pinksen; Second: Kaitlin MacDonald; Lead: Alison Taylor	Whitehorse CC, Whitehorse Skip: Hailey Birnie; Third: Patty Wallingham (Note: Team Yukon's alternate Stephanie Brown threw third stones during Draw 12 and second stones during Draw 14.) (Note: Team Yukon's alternate Stephanie Brown threw third stones during Draw 10. Regular third Patty Wallingham threw second stones while regular second Kerry Campbell sat out.); Second: Kerry Campbell; Lead: Kimberly Tuor; Alternate: Stephanie Brown
(Manitoba) Wild Card #1	(Saskatchewan) Wild Card #2	(Ontario) Wild Card #3
East St. Paul CC, East St. Paul Skip: Tracy Fleury (Note: Wild Card #1's skip Tracy Fleury tested positive for COVID-19 before travelling to the Scotties to compete. For the teams' first seven games, alternate Robyn Njegovan slotted in to play third while third Selena Njegovan moved up and skipped the team. Fleury rejoined the team for their last round robin game against Northern Ontario and the playoffs.); Third: Selena Njegovan; Second: Liz Fyfe; Lead: Kristin MacCuish; Alternate: Robyn Njegovan	Highland CC, Regina Skip: Chelsea Carey; Third: Jolene Campbell; Second: Stephanie Schmidt (Note: Wild Card #2's alternate Rachel Erickson threw lead stones for the last five ends of Draw 3 and second stones during Draw 9.); Lead: Jennifer Armstrong; Alternate: Rachel Erickson	Ottawa CC, Ottawa Skip: Emma Miskew; Third: Sarah Wilkes; Second: Allison Flaxey (Note: Team Wild Card #3's alternate Lynn Kreviazuk threw second stones for the last two ends of Draw 11.); Lead: Joanne Courtney; Alternate: Lynn Kreviazuk

=== CTRS ranking ===
Member Association (Skip)	Rank	Points
(Manitoba) Wild Card #1 (Fleury)	1	297.088
Alberta (Walker)	3	138.020
Canada (Einarson)	4	128.202
(Saskatchewan) Wild Card #2 (Carey)	5	127.057
(Ontario) Wild Card #3 (Homan)	6	125.030
Manitoba (Zacharias)	7	119.701
Ontario (Duncan)	8	116.055
Saskatchewan (Barker)	11	101.007
Northern Ontario (McCarville)	12	90.892
Northwest Territories (Galusha)	13	90.268
Nova Scotia (Black)	17	87.774
New Brunswick (Crawford)	22	69.553
Prince Edward Island (Birt)	27	59.093
British Columbia (Arsenault)	58	24.366
Quebec (St-Georges)	76	13.010
Newfoundland and Labrador (Hill)	78	12.110
Nunavut (MacPhail)	96	3.427
Yukon (Birnie)	107	1.696

== Wild card selection ==
In previous years, a wild card game was played between the top two teams on the Canadian Team Ranking System standings who did not win their provincial championship; the winner of this game was usually granted the final spot in the tournament. However, with many provinces cancelling their provincial championships due to the ongoing COVID-19 pandemic in Canada, thus not allowing many teams to compete for a chance to play at the Scotties, Curling Canada opted to include three wild card teams instead of the usual one. These teams directly qualified and did not participate in a play-in game. This was the second time this format was used, with the first being in 2021.

CTRS standings for wild card selection
Rank	Team	Member Association	Eligibility
1	Tracy Fleury	Manitoba	Eliminated from provincials
2	~~Jennifer Jones~~	Manitoba	Playing in Olympics (ineligible)
3	~~Laura Walker~~	Alberta	Won Alberta provincials
4	~~Kerri Einarson~~	Manitoba	Qualified as Team Canada (ineligible)
5	Chelsea Carey	Saskatchewan	Eliminated from provincials
6	Rachel Homan	Ontario	Was not named provincial representative

== Map of teams ==
Team Canada Provincial Winners Wild-Card Teams

== Round robin standings ==
Final Round Robin Standings

Key
Teams to Championship Round
Teams to Tiebreakers

Pool A	Skip	W	L	PF	PA	EW	EL	BE	SE	S%
(Manitoba) Wild Card #1	Tracy Fleury	7	1	67	38	39	25	6	15	80%
New Brunswick	Andrea Crawford	6	2	55	45	36	32	6	8	78%
Northern Ontario	Krista McCarville	5	3	52	47	36	32	2	12	78%
Saskatchewan	Penny Barker	4	4	51	54	34	32	5	14	72%
Prince Edward Island	Suzanne Birt	4	4	56	54	35	36	1	10	76%
(Saskatchewan) Wild Card #2	Chelsea Carey	4	4	53	53	33	35	6	8	76%
(Ontario) Wild Card #3	Emma Miskew	4	4	67	47	35	30	4	12	79%
Newfoundland and Labrador	Sarah Hill	2	6	48	57	29	39	4	7	74%
Nunavut	Brigitte MacPhail	0	8	28	82	24	40	2	7	64%

Pool B	Skip	W	L	PF	PA	EW	EL	BE	SE	S%
Canada	Kerri Einarson	8	0	70	39	32	27	8	9	86%
Nova Scotia	Christina Black	5	3	56	47	35	36	3	9	77%
Northwest Territories	Kerry Galusha	5	3	59	51	36	35	1	11	77%
Manitoba	Mackenzie Zacharias	5	3	59	50	36	33	7	9	79%
Ontario	Hollie Duncan	4	4	61	58	39	36	1	11	76%
Alberta	Laura Walker	3	5	58	62	34	38	2	5	76%
Quebec	Laurie St-Georges	3	5	50	59	36	35	3	11	73%
British Columbia	Mary-Anne Arsenault	3	5	57	62	33	34	3	9	76%
Yukon	Hailey Birnie	0	8	40	82	29	36	1	6	65%

== Round robin results ==
All draw times are listed in Eastern Time (UTC−05:00).

=== Draw 1 ===
Friday, January 28, 7:00 pm

Sheet A	1	2	3	4	5	6	7	8	9	10	Final
Nunavut (MacPhail)	0	0	0	0	0	2	0	0	X	X	2
Prince Edward Island (Birt) 🔨	1	2	1	0	2	0	3	3	X	X	12

Sheet B	1	2	3	4	5	6	7	8	9	10	Final
Northern Ontario (McCarville) 🔨	0	1	1	3	0	1	0	1	0	X	7
(Saskatchewan) Wild Card #2 (Carey)	0	0	0	0	2	0	0	0	1	X	3

Sheet C	1	2	3	4	5	6	7	8	9	10	Final
(Ontario) Wild Card #3 (Miskew) 🔨	0	3	0	1	1	0	3	0	2	X	10
Newfoundland and Labrador (Hill)	0	0	1	0	0	2	0	2	0	X	5

Sheet D	1	2	3	4	5	6	7	8	9	10	Final
New Brunswick (Crawford) 🔨	1	0	0	2	0	0	0	2	0	1	6
(Manitoba) Wild Card #1 (Fleury)	0	0	1	0	1	1	0	0	2	0	5

=== Draw 2 ===
Saturday, January 29, 2:00 pm

Sheet A	1	2	3	4	5	6	7	8	9	10	Final
Ontario (Duncan) 🔨	2	0	0	0	2	0	1	0	X	X	5
Canada (Einarson)	0	1	1	3	0	4	0	3	X	X	12

Sheet B	1	2	3	4	5	6	7	8	9	10	Final
Nova Scotia (Black) 🔨	0	1	0	2	0	2	1	0	1	X	7
Northwest Territories (Galusha)	0	0	2	0	2	0	0	1	0	X	5

Sheet C	1	2	3	4	5	6	7	8	9	10	Final
British Columbia (Arsenault) 🔨	2	0	0	1	1	0	0	0	1	0	5
Manitoba (Zacharias)	0	1	1	0	0	2	1	0	0	1	6

Sheet D	1	2	3	4	5	6	7	8	9	10	11	Final
Alberta (Walker) 🔨	2	0	0	2	0	0	0	4	0	0	0	8
Quebec (St-Georges)	0	1	2	0	0	1	1	0	2	1	1	9

=== Draw 3 ===
Saturday, January 29, 7:00 pm

Sheet A	1	2	3	4	5	6	7	8	9	10	Final
(Manitoba) Wild Card #1 (Fleury) 🔨	0	2	0	0	0	1	2	0	3	1	9
Saskatchewan (Barker)	1	0	2	1	1	0	0	2	0	0	7

Sheet B	1	2	3	4	5	6	7	8	9	10	Final
(Ontario) Wild Card #3 (Miskew)	1	0	0	0	0	1	0	0	0	X	2
New Brunswick (Crawford) 🔨	0	0	0	1	1	0	0	3	2	X	7

Sheet C	1	2	3	4	5	6	7	8	9	10	Final
Northern Ontario (McCarville) 🔨	1	0	0	1	2	0	2	0	2	X	8
Prince Edward Island (Birt)	0	1	1	0	0	1	0	2	0	X	5

Sheet D	1	2	3	4	5	6	7	8	9	10	Final
(Saskatchewan) Wild Card #2 (Carey) 🔨	2	0	4	0	0	0	2	0	0	4	12
Nunavut (MacPhail)	0	1	0	1	2	1	0	1	1	0	7

=== Draw 4 ===
Sunday, January 30, 9:00 am

Sheet A	1	2	3	4	5	6	7	8	9	10	Final
Quebec (St-Georges)	2	1	2	0	0	0	1	2	0	0	8
Yukon (Birnie) 🔨	0	0	0	2	1	1	0	0	2	1	7

Sheet B	1	2	3	4	5	6	7	8	9	10	Final
British Columbia (Arsenault)	0	0	1	0	3	0	3	0	1	0	8
Alberta (Walker) 🔨	0	1	0	3	0	2	0	2	0	1	9

Sheet C	1	2	3	4	5	6	7	8	9	10	Final
Nova Scotia (Black) 🔨	0	0	0	1	0	0	1	0	1	X	3
Canada (Einarson)	2	1	1	0	0	1	0	1	0	X	6

Sheet D	1	2	3	4	5	6	7	8	9	10	Final
Northwest Territories (Galusha)	1	0	1	0	1	0	1	0	2	1	7
Ontario (Duncan) 🔨	0	1	0	1	0	1	0	2	0	0	5

=== Draw 5 ===
Sunday, January 30, 2:00 pm

Sheet A	1	2	3	4	5	6	7	8	9	10	Final
Northern Ontario (McCarville) 🔨	2	0	0	0	1	0	1	1	0	X	5
(Ontario) Wild Card #3 (Miskew)	0	1	1	3	0	2	0	0	1	X	8

Sheet B	1	2	3	4	5	6	7	8	9	10	Final
Prince Edward Island (Birt)	0	0	0	0	0	1	0	0	X	X	1
(Manitoba) Wild Card #1 (Fleury) 🔨	2	1	1	2	2	0	1	0	X	X	9

Sheet C	1	2	3	4	5	6	7	8	9	10	Final
New Brunswick (Crawford) 🔨	0	2	0	1	0	1	1	0	1	X	6
Nunavut (MacPhail)	0	0	1	0	1	0	0	1	0	X	3

Sheet D	1	2	3	4	5	6	7	8	9	10	Final
Newfoundland and Labrador (Hill) 🔨	0	0	2	0	0	0	2	0	2	0	6
Saskatchewan (Barker)	1	1	0	1	1	0	0	3	0	1	8

=== Draw 6 ===
Sunday, January 30, 7:00 pm

Sheet A	1	2	3	4	5	6	7	8	9	10	Final
Nova Scotia (Black) 🔨	0	5	0	0	1	1	1	1	X	X	9
British Columbia (Arsenault)	1	0	1	1	0	0	0	0	X	X	3

Sheet B	1	2	3	4	5	6	7	8	9	10	Final
Canada (Einarson)	2	0	2	0	0	2	0	2	0	X	8
Quebec (St-Georges) 🔨	0	1	0	1	0	0	2	0	1	X	5

Sheet C	1	2	3	4	5	6	7	8	9	10	Final
Alberta (Walker) 🔨	2	0	1	0	0	2	0	3	0	1	9
Ontario (Duncan)	0	2	0	1	2	0	0	0	2	0	7

Sheet D	1	2	3	4	5	6	7	8	9	10	Final
Manitoba (Zacharias) 🔨	4	0	2	1	2	0	3	0	X	X	12
Yukon (Birnie)	0	1	0	0	0	1	0	1	X	X	3

=== Draw 7 ===
Monday, January 31, 9:00 am

Sheet A	1	2	3	4	5	6	7	8	9	10	11	Final
Prince Edward Island (Birt) 🔨	1	1	0	4	0	0	1	0	1	0	0	8
New Brunswick (Crawford)	0	0	1	0	2	1	0	2	0	2	2	10

Sheet B	1	2	3	4	5	6	7	8	9	10	Final
Nunavut (MacPhail) 🔨	0	1	0	0	0	1	0	1	X	X	3
Newfoundland and Labrador (Hill)	1	0	2	3	2	0	4	0	X	X	12

Sheet C	1	2	3	4	5	6	7	8	9	10	11	Final
Saskatchewan (Barker) 🔨	2	0	1	0	1	0	0	3	0	0	1	8
(Saskatchewan) Wild Card #2 (Carey)	0	1	0	3	0	0	0	0	2	1	0	7

Sheet D	1	2	3	4	5	6	7	8	9	10	Final
(Manitoba) Wild Card #1 (Fleury)	0	3	0	1	1	0	5	0	1	X	11
(Ontario) Wild Card #3 (Miskew) 🔨	4	0	0	0	0	3	0	2	0	X	9

=== Draw 8 ===
Monday, January 31, 2:00 pm

Sheet A	1	2	3	4	5	6	7	8	9	10	Final
Canada (Einarson) 🔨	2	0	2	3	0	0	3	0	X	X	10
Alberta (Walker)	0	1	0	0	1	2	0	1	X	X	5

Sheet B	1	2	3	4	5	6	7	8	9	10	11	Final
Ontario (Duncan)	0	1	0	0	2	0	2	1	0	1	0	7
Manitoba (Zacharias) 🔨	2	0	1	1	0	2	0	0	1	0	1	8

Sheet C	1	2	3	4	5	6	7	8	9	10	Final
Yukon (Birnie) 🔨	0	1	0	0	0	1	2	0	X	X	4
Northwest Territories (Galusha)	1	0	4	2	1	0	0	5	X	X	13

Sheet D	1	2	3	4	5	6	7	8	9	10	Final
Quebec (St-Georges)	0	2	0	0	1	0	0	2	0	X	5
British Columbia (Arsenault) 🔨	3	0	0	2	0	1	1	0	1	X	8

=== Draw 9 ===
Monday, January 31, 7:00 pm

Sheet A	1	2	3	4	5	6	7	8	9	10	Final
(Saskatchewan) Wild Card #2 (Carey)	0	0	1	1	0	0	1	0	1	1	5
Newfoundland and Labrador (Hill) 🔨	0	1	0	0	0	1	0	2	0	0	4

Sheet B	1	2	3	4	5	6	7	8	9	10	Final
New Brunswick (Crawford) 🔨	2	0	0	0	1	0	2	0	0	1	6
Saskatchewan (Barker)	0	0	1	1	0	1	0	1	0	0	4

Sheet C	1	2	3	4	5	6	7	8	9	10	Final
Prince Edward Island (Birt) 🔨	2	0	0	1	0	2	0	1	0	2	8
(Ontario) Wild Card #3 (Miskew)	0	1	2	0	1	0	1	0	2	0	7

Sheet D	1	2	3	4	5	6	7	8	9	10	Final
Nunavut (MacPhail)	1	1	0	1	2	0	0	1	0	0	6
Northern Ontario (McCarville) 🔨	0	0	1	0	0	2	3	0	0	1	7

=== Draw 10 ===
Tuesday, February 1, 9:00 am

Sheet A	1	2	3	4	5	6	7	8	9	10	Final
Northwest Territories (Galusha) 🔨	2	2	0	0	2	1	0	1	0	X	8
Manitoba (Zacharias)	0	0	1	1	0	0	3	0	1	X	6

Sheet B	1	2	3	4	5	6	7	8	9	10	Final
Alberta (Walker) 🔨	3	2	0	2	0	0	0	1	3	X	11
Yukon (Birnie)	0	0	2	0	1	2	0	0	0	X	5

Sheet C	1	2	3	4	5	6	7	8	9	10	Final
Canada (Einarson)	0	0	4	0	0	3	0	3	X	X	10
British Columbia (Arsenault) 🔨	0	3	0	1	0	0	1	0	X	X	5

Sheet D	1	2	3	4	5	6	7	8	9	10	11	Final
Ontario (Duncan)	1	2	1	0	1	0	0	1	0	0	2	8
Nova Scotia (Black) 🔨	0	0	0	2	0	2	1	0	0	1	0	6

=== Draw 11 ===
Tuesday, February 1, 2:00 pm

Sheet A	1	2	3	4	5	6	7	8	9	10	Final
(Ontario) Wild Card #3 (Miskew) 🔨	0	2	0	4	2	3	1	2	X	X	14
Nunavut (MacPhail)	0	0	1	0	0	0	0	0	X	X	1

Sheet B	1	2	3	4	5	6	7	8	9	10	Final
Newfoundland and Labrador (Hill)	0	2	0	0	2	0	1	2	1	X	8
Northern Ontario (McCarville) 🔨	3	0	1	0	0	1	0	0	0	X	5

Sheet C	1	2	3	4	5	6	7	8	9	10	Final
(Saskatchewan) Wild Card #2 (Carey) 🔨	2	0	1	0	0	1	0	0	0	0	4
(Manitoba) Wild Card #1 (Fleury)	0	2	0	2	0	0	0	0	2	3	9

Sheet D	1	2	3	4	5	6	7	8	9	10	Final
Saskatchewan (Barker) 🔨	0	1	0	2	1	0	0	4	1	X	9
Prince Edward Island (Birt)	0	0	1	0	0	3	2	0	0	X	6

=== Draw 12 ===
Tuesday, February 1, 7:00 pm

Sheet A	1	2	3	4	5	6	7	8	9	10	Final
British Columbia (Arsenault)	0	2	0	0	2	0	0	0	2	X	6
Ontario (Duncan) 🔨	1	0	1	1	0	3	1	2	0	X	9

Sheet B	1	2	3	4	5	6	7	8	9	10	Final
Manitoba (Zacharias)	0	0	1	0	1	1	0	2	0	1	6
Nova Scotia (Black) 🔨	2	2	0	2	0	0	1	0	0	0	7

Sheet C	1	2	3	4	5	6	7	8	9	10	Final
Northwest Territories (Galusha)	0	0	1	0	2	0	1	0	0	3	7
Quebec (St-Georges) 🔨	1	1	0	2	0	1	0	0	1	0	6

Sheet D	1	2	3	4	5	6	7	8	9	10	Final
Yukon (Birnie)	0	1	0	1	0	0	2	0	0	X	4
Canada (Einarson) 🔨	4	0	0	0	0	2	0	0	0	X	6

=== Draw 13 ===
Wednesday, February 2, 9:00 am

Sheet A	1	2	3	4	5	6	7	8	9	10	Final
Newfoundland and Labrador (Hill)	0	0	0	0	1	0	1	1	0	X	3
(Manitoba) Wild Card #1 (Fleury) 🔨	2	1	1	1	0	1	0	0	2	X	8

Sheet B	1	2	3	4	5	6	7	8	9	10	Final
(Saskatchewan) Wild Card #2 (Carey)	1	0	1	0	1	0	0	1	0	0	4
Prince Edward Island (Birt) 🔨	0	1	0	1	0	3	0	0	1	2	8

Sheet C	1	2	3	4	5	6	7	8	9	10	Final
Nunavut (MacPhail) 🔨	0	0	0	0	2	0	1	1	0	X	4
Saskatchewan (Barker)	2	4	1	2	0	1	0	0	1	X	11

Sheet D	1	2	3	4	5	6	7	8	9	10	11	Final
Northern Ontario (McCarville) 🔨	0	1	0	2	1	0	2	0	1	0	1	8
New Brunswick (Crawford)	1	0	1	0	0	2	0	1	0	2	0	7

=== Draw 14 ===
Wednesday, February 2, 2:00 pm

Sheet A	1	2	3	4	5	6	7	8	9	10	11	Final
Manitoba (Zacharias) 🔨	0	0	0	0	1	0	1	1	0	0	1	4
Quebec (St-Georges)	0	0	0	1	0	1	0	0	0	1	0	3

Sheet B	1	2	3	4	5	6	7	8	9	10	Final
Northwest Territories (Galusha)	0	1	0	1	1	0	2	0	0	X	5
Canada (Einarson) 🔨	2	0	2	0	0	3	0	0	1	X	8

Sheet C	1	2	3	4	5	6	7	8	9	10	Final
Ontario (Duncan) 🔨	3	0	1	0	2	0	2	0	3	X	11
Yukon (Birnie)	0	1	0	1	0	1	0	2	0	X	5

Sheet D	1	2	3	4	5	6	7	8	9	10	Final
Nova Scotia (Black)	1	0	1	0	1	0	1	1	1	0	6
Alberta (Walker) 🔨	0	1	0	2	0	1	0	0	0	1	5

=== Draw 15 ===
Wednesday, February 2, 7:00 pm

Sheet A	1	2	3	4	5	6	7	8	9	10	Final
Saskatchewan (Barker)	0	0	0	0	0	0	0	0	2	X	2
Northern Ontario (McCarville) 🔨	1	0	0	1	2	1	0	1	0	X	6

Sheet B	1	2	3	4	5	6	7	8	9	10	Final
(Manitoba) Wild Card #1 (Fleury) 🔨	0	2	0	0	0	3	0	2	1	X	8
Nunavut (MacPhail)	0	0	0	1	0	0	1	0	0	X	2

Sheet C	1	2	3	4	5	6	7	8	9	10	Final
Newfoundland and Labrador (Hill) 🔨	0	0	2	0	2	0	1	0	X	X	5
New Brunswick (Crawford)	1	1	0	4	0	1	0	3	X	X	10

Sheet D	1	2	3	4	5	6	7	8	9	10	Final
(Ontario) Wild Card #3 (Miskew)	0	0	0	2	0	2	0	2	1	0	7
(Saskatchewan) Wild Card #2 (Carey) 🔨	1	1	2	0	2	0	1	0	0	1	8

=== Draw 16 ===
Thursday, February 3, 9:00 am

Sheet A	1	2	3	4	5	6	7	8	9	10	Final
Yukon (Birnie) 🔨	0	1	0	1	0	1	0	1	0	X	4
Nova Scotia (Black)	0	0	1	0	2	0	4	0	3	X	10

Sheet B	1	2	3	4	5	6	7	8	9	10	Final
Quebec (St-Georges) 🔨	1	0	0	0	2	0	1	0	0	X	4
Ontario (Duncan)	0	1	2	1	0	2	0	2	1	X	9

Sheet C	1	2	3	4	5	6	7	8	9	10	Final
Manitoba (Zacharias) 🔨	4	0	0	0	4	0	1	0	0	1	10
Alberta (Walker)	0	1	0	2	0	2	0	2	0	0	7

Sheet D	1	2	3	4	5	6	7	8	9	10	Final
British Columbia (Arsenault) 🔨	2	0	0	1	2	2	2	0	2	X	11
Northwest Territories (Galusha)	0	2	1	0	0	0	0	3	0	X	6

=== Draw 17 ===
Thursday, February 3, 1:00 pm

Sheet A	1	2	3	4	5	6	7	8	9	10	Final
New Brunswick (Crawford) 🔨	1	0	1	0	0	0	1	0	0	X	3
(Saskatchewan) Wild Card #2 (Carey)	0	2	0	0	1	1	0	3	3	X	10

Sheet B	1	2	3	4	5	6	7	8	9	10	Final
Saskatchewan (Barker)	0	0	0	1	0	0	1	0	X	X	2
(Ontario) Wild Card #3 (Miskew) 🔨	0	2	2	0	2	3	0	1	X	X	10

Sheet C	1	2	3	4	5	6	7	8	9	10	Final
(Manitoba) Wild Card #1 (Fleury) 🔨	0	0	1	2	0	1	0	2	0	2	8
Northern Ontario (McCarville)	0	1	0	0	1	0	2	0	2	0	6

Sheet D	1	2	3	4	5	6	7	8	9	10	Final
Prince Edward Island (Birt) 🔨	1	0	1	1	0	0	1	0	3	1	8
Newfoundland and Labrador (Hill)	0	1	0	0	2	1	0	1	0	0	5

=== Draw 18 ===
Thursday, February 3, 7:00 pm

Sheet A	1	2	3	4	5	6	7	8	9	10	Final
Alberta (Walker) 🔨	1	0	1	0	0	1	0	1	0	0	4
Northwest Territories (Galusha)	0	1	0	2	1	0	1	0	1	1	7

Sheet B	1	2	3	4	5	6	7	8	9	10	Final
Yukon (Birnie) 🔨	0	3	0	0	2	0	1	0	2	X	8
British Columbia (Arsenault)	2	0	1	3	0	3	0	2	0	X	11

Sheet C	1	2	3	4	5	6	7	8	9	10	Final
Quebec (St-Georges) 🔨	2	0	1	0	1	0	3	0	1	2	10
Nova Scotia (Black)	0	1	0	3	0	1	0	3	0	0	8

Sheet D	1	2	3	4	5	6	7	8	9	10	Final
Canada (Einarson)	0	0	1	0	4	0	2	0	2	1	10
Manitoba (Zacharias) 🔨	0	5	0	1	0	1	0	0	0	0	7

== Tiebreaker ==
Friday, February 4, 9:00 am

Sheet C	1	2	3	4	5	6	7	8	9	10	Final
Northwest Territories (Galusha) 🔨	0	3	0	2	0	0	0	3	0	X	8
Manitoba (Zacharias)	0	0	1	0	1	1	0	0	3	X	6

Player percentages
Northwest Territories		Manitoba	
Kerry Galusha	74%	Lauren Lenentine	88%
Margot Flemming	83%	Emily Zacharias	70%
Sarah Koltun	79%	Karlee Burgess	61%
Jo-Ann Rizzo	78%	Mackenzie Zacharias	68%
Total	78%	Total	72%

== Championship round ==
Semifinals
B2	Nova Scotia	8
A3	Northern Ontario	11
A2	New Brunswick	8
B3	Northwest Territories	6

Finals
A1	(Manitoba) Wild Card #1	3
A3	Northern Ontario	8
B1	Canada	6
A2	New Brunswick	8

=== Semifinals ===
Friday, February 4, 1:00 pm

Sheet A	1	2	3	4	5	6	7	8	9	10	Final
Nova Scotia (Black)	0	1	0	0	4	1	1	1	0	X	8
Northern Ontario (McCarville) 🔨	1	0	4	4	0	0	0	0	2	X	11

Player percentages
Nova Scotia		Northern Ontario	
Shelley Barker	90%	Sarah Potts	75%
Karlee Everist	75%	Ashley Sippala	83%
Jenn Baxter	79%	Kendra Lilly	76%
Christina Black	61%	Krista McCarville	74%
Total	76%	Total	77%

Sheet B	1	2	3	4	5	6	7	8	9	10	Final
New Brunswick (Crawford)	0	1	0	2	0	2	2	0	0	1	8
Northwest Territories (Galusha) 🔨	2	0	1	0	2	0	0	1	0	0	6

Player percentages
New Brunswick		Northwest Territories	
Katie Forward	83%	Kerry Galusha	70%
Jillian Babin	75%	Margot Flemming	78%
Sylvie Quillian	69%	Sarah Koltun	80%
Andrea Crawford	73%	Jo-Ann Rizzo	74%
Total	75%	Total	75%

=== Finals ===
Friday, February 4, 7:00 pm

Sheet A	1	2	3	4	5	6	7	8	9	10	Final
Canada (Einarson)	0	0	0	3	1	0	0	0	2	0	6
New Brunswick (Crawford) 🔨	1	1	2	0	0	1	1	1	0	1	8

Player percentages
Canada		New Brunswick	
Briane Meilleur	91%	Katie Forward	74%
Shannon Birchard	65%	Jillian Babin	66%
Val Sweeting	78%	Sylvie Quillian	73%
Kerri Einarson	70%	Andrea Crawford	69%
Total	76%	Total	70%

Sheet B	1	2	3	4	5	6	7	8	9	10	Final
(Manitoba) Wild Card #1 (Fleury) 🔨	0	0	0	0	0	0	1	1	1	X	3
Northern Ontario (McCarville)	0	2	1	1	2	2	0	0	0	X	8

Player percentages
(Manitoba) Wild Card #1		Northern Ontario	
Kristin MacCuish	88%	Sarah Potts	79%
Liz Fyfe	67%	Ashley Sippala	78%
Selena Njegovan	63%	Kendra Lilly	92%
Tracy Fleury	64%	Krista McCarville	93%
Total	70%	Total	86%

== Playoffs ==
Page playoff system
1	New Brunswick	8
2	Northern Ontario	9
3	Canada	11
4	(Manitoba) Wild Card #1	6

Semifinal
1	New Brunswick	4
3	Canada	8

Final
2	Northern Ontario	6
3	Canada	9

=== 1 vs. 2 ===
Saturday, February 5, 7:00 pm

Sheet C	1	2	3	4	5	6	7	8	9	10	11	Final
New Brunswick (Crawford) 🔨	2	0	2	1	1	0	1	0	1	0	0	8
Northern Ontario (McCarville)	0	3	0	0	0	0	0	3	0	2	1	9

Player percentages
New Brunswick		Northern Ontario	
Katie Forward	89%	Sarah Potts	94%
Jillian Babin	84%	Ashley Sippala	91%
Sylvie Quillian	82%	Kendra Lilly	76%
Andrea Crawford	63%	Krista McCarville	64%
Total	79%	Total	81%

=== 3 vs. 4 ===
Saturday, February 5, 2:00 pm

Sheet C	1	2	3	4	5	6	7	8	9	10	Final
Canada (Einarson) 🔨	0	1	0	3	0	4	2	0	1	X	11
(Manitoba) Wild Card #1 (Fleury)	0	0	3	0	2	0	0	1	0	X	6

Player percentages
Canada		(Manitoba) Wild Card #1	
Briane Meilleur	86%	Kristin MacCuish	85%
Shannon Birchard	82%	Liz Fyfe	81%
Val Sweeting	83%	Selena Njegovan	68%
Kerri Einarson	81%	Tracy Fleury	69%
Total	83%	Total	76%

=== Semifinal ===
Sunday, February 6, 12:00 pm

Sheet C	1	2	3	4	5	6	7	8	9	10	Final
New Brunswick (Crawford)	0	1	0	1	0	1	0	1	0	X	4
Canada (Einarson) 🔨	2	0	1	0	1	0	2	0	2	X	8

Player percentages
New Brunswick		Canada	
Katie Forward	88%	Briane Meilleur	92%
Jillian Babin	69%	Shannon Birchard	88%
Sylvie Quillian	78%	Val Sweeting	83%
Andrea Crawford	72%	Kerri Einarson	89%
Total	77%	Total	88%

=== Final ===
Sunday, February 6, 7:00 pm

Sheet C	1	2	3	4	5	6	7	8	9	10	Final
Northern Ontario (McCarville)	0	1	0	1	0	2	0	2	0	0	6
Canada (Einarson) 🔨	1	0	2	0	3	0	1	0	1	1	9

Player percentages
Northern Ontario		Canada	
Sarah Potts	95%	Briane Meilleur	80%
Ashley Sippala	83%	Shannon Birchard	85%
Kendra Lilly	71%	Val Sweeting	90%
Krista McCarville	69%	Kerri Einarson	83%
Total	79%	Total	84%

== Statistics ==
=== Top 5 player percentages ===
Final Round Robin Percentages; minimum 6 games

Key
First All-Star Team
Second All-Star Team

Leads	%
(Canada) Briane Meilleur	87
(Northwest Territories) Kerry Galusha (Skip)	86
(Northern Ontario) Sarah Potts	85
WC3 Joanne Courtney	84
(Nova Scotia) Shelley Barker	81
(Newfoundland and Labrador) Adrienne Mercer	81
(Manitoba) Lauren Lenentine	81

Seconds	%
(Canada) Shannon Birchard	82
(Northern Ontario) Ashley Sippala	80
(Manitoba) Emily Zacharias	80
WC1 Liz Fyfe	79
(New Brunswick) Jillian Babin	78
WC2 Stephanie Schmidt	78

Thirds	%
(Canada) Val Sweeting	88
WC3 Sarah Wilkes	81
WC1 Robyn Njegovan	80
WC2 Jolene Campbell	80
(Manitoba) Karlee Burgess	79

Skips	%
(Canada) Kerri Einarson	86
WC1 Selena Njegovan	81
(New Brunswick) Andrea Crawford	78
(Nova Scotia) Christina Black	76
WC3 Emma Miskew	75
(British Columbia) Mary-Anne Arsenault	75

== Awards ==
The awards and all-star teams were as follows:

All-Star Teams

First Team

- Skip: Kerri Einarson, Team Canada
- Third: Val Sweeting, Team Canada
- Second: Shannon Birchard, Team Canada
- Lead: Briane Meilleur, Team Canada

Second Team

- Skip: (Manitoba) Selena Njegovan, Wild Card 1
- Third: (Ontario) Sarah Wilkes, Wild Card 3
- Second: Ashley Sippala, Northern Ontario
- Lead: Kerry Galusha, Northwest Territories (skip; threw lead stones)

Marj Mitchell Sportsmanship Award

- Karlee Everist, Nova Scotia

Joan Mead Builder Award

- Leslie Kerr, inaugural Executive Director of the Northern Ontario Curling Association from 2007 to 2020, after guiding the amalgamation of 5 regional curling associations into the NOCA.

== Provincial and territorial playdowns ==
- 2022 Alberta Scotties Tournament of Hearts
- 2022 British Columbia Scotties Tournament of Hearts
- 2022 Manitoba Scotties Tournament of Hearts
- New Brunswick Scotties Tournament of Hearts: Cancelled.
- Newfoundland and Labrador Scotties Tournament of Hearts: Cancelled.
- Northern Ontario Scotties Tournament of Hearts: Cancelled.
- 2022 Northwest Territories Scotties Tournament of Hearts: Cancelled.
- 2022 Nova Scotia Scotties Tournament of Hearts
- Nunavut Scotties Tournament of Hearts: Not held.
- 2022 Ontario Scotties Tournament of Hearts: Postponed until April (no longer a qualifier)
- Prince Edward Island Scotties Tournament of Hearts: Cancelled.
- Quebec Scotties Tournament of Hearts: Cancelled.
- 2022 Saskatchewan Scotties Tournament of Hearts
- 2022 Yukon Scotties Tournament of Hearts was held January 4–5 in Whitehorse. Team Hailey Birnie defeated Laura Eby 2–0 in a best of three series for the championship. Birnie won the first game 6–5 and the second game 8–4.
