= Mackenzie Zacharias =

Canadian curler

- Curler
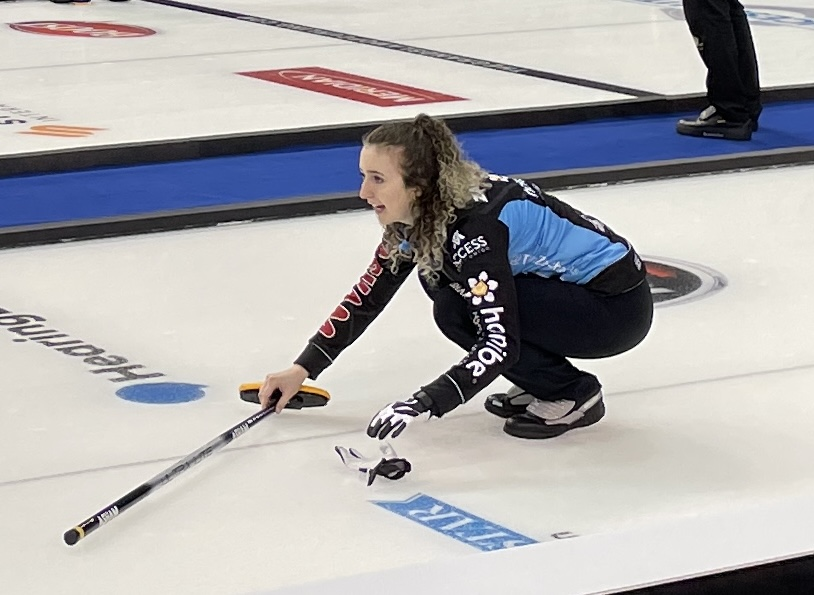
- Zacharias at the 2022 Players' Championship
- Born: June 8, 1999 (age 27); Winnipeg, Manitoba

Team
- Curling club: Altona CC, Altona, MB

Curling career
- Member Association: Manitoba
- Hearts: 3 (2021, 2022, 2023)
- Top CTRS ranking: 3rd (2022–23)
Medal record
Women's curling
Representing Canada
World Junior Curling Championships
Gold medal – first place	2020 Krasnoyarsk
Representing Manitoba
Scotties Tournament of Hearts
Silver medal – second place	2023 Kamloops

Mackenzie Marie Zacharias (born June 8, 1999) is a retired Canadian curler from Altona, Manitoba. She skipped her Manitoba rink to a gold medal at both the 2020 Canadian Junior Curling Championships and the 2020 World Junior Curling Championships. Prior to focusing solely on curling, she was also a competitive softball player

== Career ==
Zacharias represented Manitoba at the 2016 U18 International Curling Championships and skipped the rink to gold medal, defeating the other undefeated team New Brunswick's Justine Comeau in the final. She also represented Manitoba the following year at the 2017 Canadian U18 Curling Championships where they finished with a 4–4 record.

Zacharias won her first Manitoba junior title in 2019. She skipped her rink to a fifth-place finish at the 2019 Canadian Junior Curling Championships. The following year, she and her sister Emily Zacharias brought on Karlee Burgess and Lauren Lenentine to the team. They would win the Manitoba juniors once again and represent Manitoba at the national championship. They would not have any loses at the 2020 Canadian Junior Curling Championships, completing a perfect 11–0 week by defeating Alberta's Abby Marks in the final. At the world junior championships, they defeated South Korea's Kim Min-ji to claim the gold medal.

Due to the COVID-19 pandemic in Canada, many provinces had to cancel their provincial championships, with member associations selecting their representatives for the 2021 Scotties Tournament of Hearts. Due to this situation, Curling Canada added three Wild Card teams to the national championship, which were based on the CTRS standings from the 2019–20 season. Because Team Zacharias ranked 11th on the CTRS and kept at least three of their four players together for the 2020–21 season, they got the second Wild Card spot at the 2021 Scotties in Calgary, Alberta. At the Hearts, Zacharias led her team to a 3–5 round robin record, failing to qualify for the championship round.

Team Zacharias won their second event of the 2021–22 season, going undefeated to capture the Mother Club Fall Curling Classic. They later had a semifinal finish at the Stu Sells Toronto Tankard after losing to eventual winners Team Hollie Duncan. Because of their successes on tour, Team Zacharias had enough points to qualify for the 2021 Canadian Olympic Curling Pre-Trials. At the Pre-Trials, the team finished the round robin with a 4–2 record. This qualified them for the double knockout round, where they lost both of their games and were eliminated. Elsewhere on tour, the team reached the quarterfinals of the Red Deer Curling Classic and won the MCT Championships in November 2021. At the 2022 Manitoba Scotties Tournament of Hearts in December 2021, Team Zacharias finished with a 3–2 record in their pool, enough to advance to the championship pool. They then won three straight games to finish first overall and earn a bye to the provincial final. In the final, they faced the Kristy Watling rink which they defeated 7–5, earning the right to represent Manitoba at the 2022 Scotties Tournament of Hearts. At the Hearts, Zacharias led her team to a 5–3 record. This qualified them for a tiebreaker against the Northwest Territories' Kerry Galusha, which they lost 8–6 and were eliminated. Team Zacharias played in their first Grand Slam event at the 2022 Players' Championship. There, they posted a 2–3 record, missing the playoffs. They wrapped up their season at the 2022 Best of the West event where they lost in the semifinals to Corryn Brown.

On March 17, 2022, Team Zacharias announced that they would be joining forces with Jennifer Jones for the 2022–23 season. Jones would take over the team as skip, with the four Zacharias members each moving down one position in the lineup. The newly revised Jones lineup found immediate success on tour, winning the 2022 Saville Shoot-Out after an undefeated run. The team then competed in the 2022 PointsBet Invitational single elimination event where they won all four of their games to claim the title. They had three semifinal finishes in a row at the 2022 Curlers Corner Autumn Gold Curling Classic, 2022 Stu Sells 1824 Halifax Classic and the DeKalb Superspiel, losing to Michèle Jäggi, Christina Black and Nancy Martin respectively. At the 2023 Manitoba Scotties Tournament of Hearts, Team Jones went undefeated to win their first provincial title as a new squad. This qualified the team for the 2023 Scotties Tournament of Hearts where after an opening draw loss, they went on a ten-game winning streak to qualify for the final where they faced the three-time defending champions in Team Kerri Einarson. Tied 2–2 in the fifth, Jones pulled up light on her final draw which gave Team Canada a steal of two. In the ninth, Jones missed a pivotal freeze which left Einarson with an open hit to count five to secure the win. In Grand Slam play, Team Jones reached the playoffs in four of six events but never made it past the quarterfinal round.

Following the 2022–23 season, Zacharias announced she would be stepping back from competitive curling. She did compete in one event during the 2023–24 season, however, the 2024 Manitoba Scotties Tournament of Hearts where she was the alternate for the Kate Cameron rink. The team finished 6–2 through the round robin and championship round. This qualified them for the semifinal, where they lost 8–4 to Beth Peterson.

Zacharias stated in February 2024 that she was permanently stepping away from the game with no plans to return to competitive curling, following discontent with the competitive nature of the game and hinting at team chemistry issues following her team competing with Jones.

== Personal life ==
Zacharias is a graduate of the University of Manitoba, majoring in kinesiology. A the time of the 2022 Scotties, she was a fitness trainer at 9Round Kickboxing Fitness. She married Calrton Reimer, a wedding photographer, on May 10, 2025 and is now Mackenzie Reimer. She is Christian, and has stated that her faith has grown and she's gotten closer to God since retiring from competitive curling.

== Grand Slam record ==
Key
C	Champion
F	Lost in Final
SF	Lost in Semifinal
QF	Lost in Quarterfinals
R16	Lost in the round of 16
Q	Did not advance to playoffs
T2	Played in Tier 2 event
DNP	Did not participate in event
N/A	Not a Grand Slam event that season

Event	2021–22	2022–23
The National	DNP	QF
Tour Challenge	DNP	Q
Masters	DNP	QF
Canadian Open	N/A	QF
Players'	Q	Q
Champions Cup	DNP	QF

== Year-by-year statistics ==
Year	Team	Position	Event	Finish	Record	Pct. (Note: Round robin only)
2016	Zacharias	Skip	Manitoba Juniors	3rd	6–3	–
2016	Zacharias (ACC)	Skip	Manitoba STOH	T12th	1–6	–
2016	Manitoba (Zacharias)	Skip	U18 International	1st	7–0	–
2017	Zacharias	Skip	Manitoba Juniors	3rd	6–3	–
2017	Manitoba (Zacharias)	Skip	Canadian U18	6th	4–4	63
2018 (Note: Event occurred in the 2017 calendar year, but was billed as the 2018 edition.)	Zacharias	Skip	Manitoba Juniors	3rd	7–2	–
2018	Zacharias (ACC)	Skip	Manitoba STOH	T5th	4–3	–
2019	Zacharias	Skip	Manitoba Juniors	1st	9–1	–
2019	Manitoba (Zacharias)	Skip	Canadian Juniors	5th	6–4	77
2020	Zacharias	Skip	Manitoba Juniors	1st	9–0	–
2020	Manitoba (Zacharias)	Skip	Canadian Juniors	1st	11–0	85
2020	Canada (Zacharias)	Skip	World Juniors	1st	9–2	80
2021	Wild Card #2 (Zacharias)	Skip	2021 STOH	T12th	3–5	68
2021	Zacharias	Skip	COCT – Pre	T5th	4–4	77
2022 (Note: Event occurred in the 2021 calendar year, but was billed as the 2022 edition.)	Zacharias (ACC)	Skip	Manitoba STOH	1st	7–2	–
2022	Manitoba (Zacharias)	Skip	2022 STOH	7th	5–4	75
2023	Jones (SVCC/ACC)	Second	Manitoba STOH	1st	9–0	–
2023	Manitoba (Jones)	Second	2023 STOH	2nd	10–2	82
Scotties Tournament of Hearts Totals					18–11	76

== Teams ==
Season	Skip	Third	Second	Lead
2015–16	Mackenzie Zacharias	Morgan Reimer	Emily Zacharias	Jenessa Rutter
2016–17	Mackenzie Zacharias	Morgan Reimer	Emily Zacharias	Jenessa Rutter
2017–18	Mackenzie Zacharias	Gaetanne Gauthier	Emily Zacharias	Ashley Groff
2018–19	Mackenzie Zacharias	Lauryn Kuzyk	Emily Zacharias	Caitlyn Labossiere
2019–20	Mackenzie Zacharias	Karlee Burgess	Emily Zacharias	Lauren Lenentine
2020–21	Mackenzie Zacharias	Karlee Burgess	Emily Zacharias	Lauren Lenentine
2021–22	Mackenzie Zacharias	Karlee Burgess	Emily Zacharias	Lauren Lenentine
2022–23	Jennifer Jones	Karlee Burgess	Mackenzie Zacharias	Emily Zacharias/Lauren Lenentine
