= 2022 Manitoba Scotties Tournament of Hearts =

Women's curling championship

2022 Manitoba Scotties Tournament of Hearts presented by Bayer
- Host city: Carberry, Manitoba
- Arena: Carberry Plains Community Centre
- Dates: December 15–19, 2021
- Winner: Team Zacharias
- Curling club: Altona CC, Altona
- Skip: Mackenzie Zacharias
- Third: Karlee Burgess
- Second: Emily Zacharias
- Lead: Lauren Lenentine
- Coach: Sheldon Zacharias
- Finalist: Kristy Watling

The 2022 Manitoba Scotties Tournament of Hearts presented by Bayer, the provincial women's curling championship for Manitoba, was held from December 15 to 19, 2021 at the Carberry Plains Community Centre in Carberry, Manitoba. The winning Mackenzie Zacharias team represented Manitoba at the 2022 Scotties Tournament of Hearts in Thunder Bay, Ontario.

The event included the World #1 ranked Tracy Fleury rink, who failed to make it to the playoffs in a shocking result.

== Qualification process ==
Qualification method	Berths	Qualifying team(s)
2019–20 CTRS leader	1	Tracy Fleury
Berth Bonspiel	1	Beth Peterson
MCT Berth 2020	2	Mackenzie Zacharias; Darcy Robertson
MCT Berth 2021	2	Kristy Watling; Meghan Walter
West Qualifier	2	Terry Ursel; Alyssa Calvert
Winnipeg Qualifier	4	Kristy McDonald; Kaitlyn Jones; Jennifer Clark-Rouire; Shae Bevan

== Teams ==
The teams are listed as follows:

Skip	Third	Second	Lead	Alternate	Club
Shae Bevan	Kyla Grabowski	Paige Beaudry	Jessica Hancox	Grace Beaudry	St. Vital Curling Club
Alyssa Calvert	Stacey Fordyce	Pam Robins	Roz Taylor		Carberry Curling Club
Jennifer Clark-Rouire	Lisa McLeod	Kelsey Meger	Laurie Macdonell	Jolene Callum	Miami Curling Club
Tracy Fleury	Selena Njegovan	Liz Fyfe	Kristin MacCuish		East St. Paul Curling Club
Kaitlyn Jones (Note: Abby Ackland skips the team and throws third stones, however, they are called Team Kaitlyn Jones.) (Fourth)	Abby Ackland (Skip)	Robyn Njegovan	Sara Oliver		Assiniboine Memorial Curling Club
Kristy McDonald	Lisa Blixhavn	Lindsay Warkentin (Note: As second Leslie Wilson-Westcott was on maternity leave, alternate Lindsay Warkentin moved up to play second and Vanessa Foster joined the team as their alternate.)	Raunora Westcott	Vanessa Foster	Granite Curling Club
Beth Peterson	Jenna Loder	Katherine Doerksen	Melissa Gordon		Assiniboine Memorial Curling Club
Darcy Robertson	Laura Burtnyk	Gaetanne Gauthier	Krysten Karwacki		Assiniboine Memorial Curling Club
Terry Ursel	Wanda Rainka	Chris Hamblin	Tracy Igonia	Brenda Walker	Neepawa Curling Club
Meghan Walter	Lane Prokopowich	Katie McKenzie	Mackenzie Elias		East St. Paul Curling Club
Kristy Watling	Hailey Ryan	Emilie Rafnson	Sarah Pyke		Assiniboine Memorial Curling Club
Mackenzie Zacharias	Karlee Burgess	Emily Zacharias	Lauren Lenentine		Altona Curling Club

== Round-robin standings ==
Final round-robin standings

Key
Teams to Championship Round

Asham Black Group	W	L
Kristy Watling	5	0
Kaitlyn Jones	4	1
Tracy Fleury	3	2
Shae Bevan	2	3
Meghan Walter	1	4
Jennifer Clark-Rouire	0	5

Asham Express Red Group	W	L
Darcy Robertson	4	1
Kristy McDonald	4	1
Mackenzie Zacharias	3	2
Beth Peterson	2	3
Terry Ursel	1	4
Alyssa Calvert	1	4

== Round-robin results ==
All draws are listed in Central Time (UTC−06:00).

=== Draw 1 ===
Wednesday, December 15, 8:30 am

Sheet A	1	2	3	4	5	6	7	8	9	10	Final
Tracy Fleury 🔨	2	0	2	2	0	0	0	4	X	X	10
Shae Bevan	0	0	0	0	1	1	0	0	X	X	2

Sheet B	1	2	3	4	5	6	7	8	9	10	Final
Kristy Watling	0	0	2	0	1	1	4	0	0	X	8
Meghan Walter 🔨	0	1	0	1	0	0	0	2	1	X	5

Sheet C	1	2	3	4	5	6	7	8	9	10	Final
Jennifer Clark-Rouire 🔨	0	0	0	3	1	0	1	0	0	0	5
Kaitlyn Jones	1	0	1	0	0	1	0	2	0	2	7

=== Draw 2 ===
Wednesday, December 15, 12:15 pm

Sheet A	1	2	3	4	5	6	7	8	9	10	Final
Mackenzie Zacharias	0	1	0	3	0	1	0	1	0	2	8
Terry Ursel 🔨	1	0	1	0	1	0	1	0	2	0	6

Sheet B	1	2	3	4	5	6	7	8	9	10	11	Final
Darcy Robertson	3	0	1	0	0	0	1	0	0	1	2	8
Kristy McDonald 🔨	0	2	0	2	0	1	0	1	0	0	0	6

Sheet C	1	2	3	4	5	6	7	8	9	10	Final
Beth Peterson	0	0	1	1	2	0	3	0	2	X	9
Alyssa Calvert 🔨	1	1	0	0	0	1	0	1	0	X	4

=== Draw 3 ===
Wednesday, December 15, 4:00 pm

Sheet A	1	2	3	4	5	6	7	8	9	10	Final
Jennifer Clark-Rouire	0	0	0	3	0	2	0	1	0	0	6
Meghan Walter 🔨	0	1	1	0	1	0	3	0	0	2	8

Sheet B	1	2	3	4	5	6	7	8	9	10	Final
Tracy Fleury 🔨	0	2	1	0	1	0	2	0	0	1	7
Kaitlyn Jones	1	0	0	3	0	1	0	2	1	0	8

Sheet C	1	2	3	4	5	6	7	8	9	10	Final
Kristy Watling	0	4	0	1	0	0	6	X	X	X	11
Shae Bevan 🔨	1	0	1	0	0	1	0	X	X	X	3

=== Draw 4 ===
Wednesday, December 15, 8:00 pm

Sheet A	1	2	3	4	5	6	7	8	9	10	Final
Kristy McDonald 🔨	0	0	1	1	0	0	1	1	0	1	5
Alyssa Calvert	0	0	0	0	2	0	0	0	2	0	4

Sheet B	1	2	3	4	5	6	7	8	9	10	Final
Beth Peterson 🔨	1	0	0	0	4	0	2	0	2	X	9
Terry Ursel	0	1	1	0	0	2	0	2	0	X	6

Sheet C	1	2	3	4	5	6	7	8	9	10	Final
Mackenzie Zacharias 🔨	0	0	2	0	2	2	0	0	0	0	6
Darcy Robertson	1	2	0	1	0	0	2	0	0	1	7

=== Draw 5 ===
Thursday, December 16, 8:30 am

Sheet A	1	2	3	4	5	6	7	8	9	10	Final
Tracy Fleury 🔨	2	0	2	2	0	4	X	X	X	X	10
Meghan Walter	0	1	0	0	1	0	X	X	X	X	2

Sheet B	1	2	3	4	5	6	7	8	9	10	Final
Jennifer Clark-Rouire 🔨	1	0	1	0	1	0	2	0	X	X	5
Kristy Watling	0	2	0	4	0	2	0	2	X	X	10

Sheet C	1	2	3	4	5	6	7	8	9	10	Final
Kaitlyn Jones 🔨	2	1	2	1	3	X	X	X	X	X	9
Shae Bevan	0	0	0	0	0	X	X	X	X	X	0

=== Draw 6 ===
Thursday, December 16, 12:15 pm

Sheet A	1	2	3	4	5	6	7	8	9	10	Final
Darcy Robertson	0	0	0	1	0	2	1	1	0	2	7
Terry Ursel 🔨	1	0	2	0	1	0	0	0	1	0	5

Sheet B	1	2	3	4	5	6	7	8	9	10	Final
Mackenzie Zacharias	0	0	3	0	2	0	0	0	0	1	6
Alyssa Calvert 🔨	1	1	0	1	0	1	0	1	0	0	5

Sheet C	1	2	3	4	5	6	7	8	9	10	Final
Beth Peterson 🔨	2	0	0	3	0	1	0	2	0	0	8
Kristy McDonald	0	1	1	0	4	0	2	0	1	1	10

=== Draw 7 ===
Thursday, December 16, 4:00 pm

Sheet A	1	2	3	4	5	6	7	8	9	10	Final
Kaitlyn Jones 🔨	1	2	0	0	1	0	0	0	0	0	4
Kristy Watling	0	0	1	1	0	1	0	1	1	2	7

Sheet B	1	2	3	4	5	6	7	8	9	10	Final
Meghan Walter 🔨	0	1	0	2	0	0	0	1	1	0	5
Shae Bevan	0	0	1	0	0	1	1	0	0	3	6

Sheet C	1	2	3	4	5	6	7	8	9	10	Final
Tracy Fleury 🔨	0	3	0	0	1	1	0	2	1	X	8
Jennifer Clark-Rouire	1	0	0	2	0	0	1	0	0	X	4

=== Draw 8 ===
Thursday, December 16, 7:45 pm

Sheet A	1	2	3	4	5	6	7	8	9	10	Final
Mackenzie Zacharias	0	2	0	0	1	X	X	X	X	X	3
Kristy McDonald 🔨	4	0	0	5	0	X	X	X	X	X	9

Sheet B	1	2	3	4	5	6	7	8	9	10	Final
Beth Peterson 🔨	1	1	0	1	0	0	2	0	1	0	6
Darcy Robertson	0	0	3	0	2	1	0	1	0	1	8

Sheet C	1	2	3	4	5	6	7	8	9	10	Final
Alyssa Calvert	1	1	0	0	1	0	0	0	4	0	7
Terry Ursel 🔨	0	0	3	2	0	1	0	1	0	1	8

=== Draw 9 ===
Friday, December 17, 9:00 am

Sheet A	1	2	3	4	5	6	7	8	9	10	Final
Jennifer Clark-Rouire	0	2	0	0	0	1	1	0	2	0	6
Shae Bevan 🔨	1	0	0	1	1	0	0	2	0	2	7

Sheet B	1	2	3	4	5	6	7	8	9	10	Final
Tracy Fleury	0	2	1	0	0	2	0	2	0	0	7
Kristy Watling 🔨	1	0	0	2	2	0	2	0	1	1	9

Sheet C	1	2	3	4	5	6	7	8	9	10	Final
Kaitlyn Jones 🔨	0	0	1	0	1	0	0	2	1	1	6
Meghan Walter	1	0	0	1	0	1	1	0	0	0	4

=== Draw 10 ===
Friday, December 17, 1:00 pm

Sheet A	1	2	3	4	5	6	7	8	9	10	Final
Darcy Robertson 🔨	1	0	0	1	0	1	0	0	0	1	4
Alyssa Calvert	0	2	0	0	1	0	0	0	2	0	5

Sheet B	1	2	3	4	5	6	7	8	9	10	Final
Kristy McDonald 🔨	2	0	0	0	0	1	0	0	5	X	8
Terry Ursel	0	0	1	0	1	0	0	0	0	X	2

Sheet C	1	2	3	4	5	6	7	8	9	10	Final
Mackenzie Zacharias 🔨	2	0	2	1	1	0	3	X	X	X	9
Beth Peterson	0	2	0	0	0	2	0	X	X	X	4

== Championship Round ==
=== Standings ===
Final Championship Pool Standings

Key
Teams to Playoffs

Skip	W	L
Mackenzie Zacharias	6	2
Kristy Watling	6	2
Kaitlyn Jones	6	2
Tracy Fleury	5	3
Darcy Robertson	5	3
Kristy McDonald	4	4

=== Results ===
==== Draw 11 ====
Friday, December 17, 6:30 pm

Sheet A	1	2	3	4	5	6	7	8	9	10	Final
Tracy Fleury	1	0	2	0	2	0	0	1	0	1	7
Darcy Robertson 🔨	0	1	0	1	0	1	0	0	1	0	4

Sheet B	1	2	3	4	5	6	7	8	9	10	Final
Kaitlyn Jones	0	0	1	0	1	0	1	1	0	2	6
Kristy McDonald 🔨	1	0	0	1	0	2	0	0	1	0	5

Sheet C	1	2	3	4	5	6	7	8	9	10	Final
Kristy Watling	0	2	0	0	0	X	X	X	X	X	2
Mackenzie Zacharias 🔨	2	0	3	3	2	X	X	X	X	X	10

==== Draw 12 ====
Saturday, December 18, 10:00 am

Sheet A	1	2	3	4	5	6	7	8	9	10	Final
Kristy Watling	0	1	0	0	4	3	0	2	0	X	10
Kristy McDonald 🔨	2	0	1	1	0	0	2	0	1	X	7

Sheet B	1	2	3	4	5	6	7	8	9	10	Final
Tracy Fleury	0	1	0	1	0	2	0	0	2	0	6
Mackenzie Zacharias 🔨	2	0	3	0	1	0	1	1	0	1	9

Sheet C	1	2	3	4	5	6	7	8	9	10	Final
Kaitlyn Jones	4	1	0	4	0	0	5	X	X	X	14
Darcy Robertson 🔨	0	0	2	0	3	1	0	X	X	X	6

==== Draw 13 ====
Saturday, December 18, 4:00 pm

Sheet A	1	2	3	4	5	6	7	8	9	10	Final
Kaitlyn Jones	0	1	0	1	0	1	0	0	2	0	5
Mackenzie Zacharias 🔨	1	0	2	0	1	0	0	1	0	1	6

Sheet B	1	2	3	4	5	6	7	8	9	10	Final
Kristy Watling 🔨	1	0	0	2	0	1	0	1	0	0	5
Darcy Robertson	0	1	2	0	1	0	1	0	1	1	7

Sheet C	1	2	3	4	5	6	7	8	9	10	Final
Tracy Fleury	0	2	0	2	0	1	1	0	0	4	10
Kristy McDonald 🔨	2	0	2	0	1	0	0	3	1	0	9

== Playoffs ==
Semifinal			Final
			1	Mackenzie Zacharias	7
2	Kristy Watling	8	2	Kristy Watling	5
3	Kaitlyn Jones	6

=== Semifinal ===
Sunday, December 19, 10:00 am

Sheet B	1	2	3	4	5	6	7	8	9	10	Final
Kristy Watling	0	1	2	1	0	2	2	0	0	X	8
Kaitlyn Jones 🔨	1	0	0	0	3	0	0	1	1	X	6

Player percentages
Team Watling		Team Jones	
Sarah Pyke	75%	Sara Oliver	79%
Emilie Rafnson	68%	Robyn Njegovan	70%
Hailey Ryan	76%	Abby Ackland	73%
Kristy Watling	68%	Kaitlyn Jones	50%
Total	72%	Total	68%

=== Final ===
Sunday, December 19, 4:00 pm

Sheet B	1	2	3	4	5	6	7	8	9	10	Final
Mackenzie Zacharias 🔨	0	2	0	1	0	0	2	0	0	2	7
Kristy Watling	0	0	2	0	1	1	0	1	0	0	5

Player percentages
Team Zacharias		Team Watling	
Lauren Lenentine	96%	Sarah Pyke	85%
Emily Zacharias	83%	Emilie Rafnson	66%
Karlee Burgess	88%	Hailey Ryan	69%
Mackenzie Zacharias	85%	Kristy Watling	85%
Total	88%	Total	76%

2022 Manitoba Scotties Tournament of Hearts

Mackenzie Zacharias
1st Manitoba Provincial Championship title
