= Emily Zacharias =

Canadian curler (born 2001)

- Curler
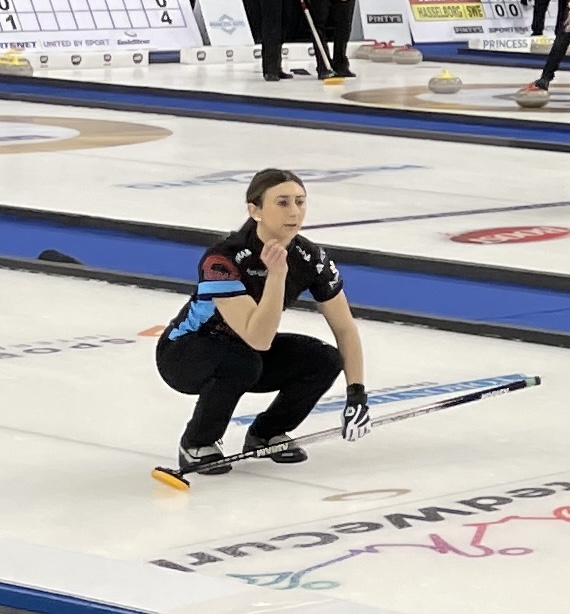
- Zacharias at the 2022 Players' Championship
- Born: March 13, 2001 (age 25); Winnipeg, Manitoba

Team
- Curling club: Altona CC, Altona, MB

Curling career
- Member Association: Manitoba
- Hearts: 4 (2021, 2022, 2023, 2024)
- Top CTRS ranking: 2nd (2023–24)
- Grand Slam victories: 1 (2023 Tour Challenge)
Medal record
Women's curling
Representing Canada
World Junior Curling Championships
Gold medal – first place	2020 Krasnoyarsk
Representing Manitoba
Scotties Tournament of Hearts
Silver medal – second place	2023 Kamloops
Silver medal – second place	2024 Calgary

Emily Paige Zacharias (born March 13, 2001) is a Canadian curler from Altona, Manitoba. As a member of her sister Mackenzie Zacharias' team, she earned gold medals at both the 2020 Canadian Junior Curling Championships and the 2020 World Junior Curling Championships.

== Career ==
Zacharias represented Manitoba at the 2016 U18 International Curling Championships where the rink won a gold medal, defeating the other undefeated team New Brunswick's Justine Comeau in the final. She also represented Manitoba the following year at the 2017 Canadian U18 Curling Championships where they finished with a 4–4 record.

Zacharias won her first Manitoba junior title in 2019. They had a fifth-place finish at the 2019 Canadian Junior Curling Championships. The following year, she and her sister Mackenzie Zacharias brought on Karlee Burgess and Lauren Lenentine to the team. They would win the Manitoba juniors once again and represent Manitoba at the national championship. They would not have any losses at the 2020 Canadian Junior Curling Championships, completing a perfect 11–0 week by defeating Alberta's Abby Marks in the final. At the world junior championships, they defeated South Korea's Kim Min-ji to claim the gold medal.

Due to the COVID-19 pandemic in Canada, many provinces had to cancel their provincial championships, with member associations selecting their representatives for the 2021 Scotties Tournament of Hearts. Due to this situation, Curling Canada added three Wild Card teams to the national championship, which were based on the CTRS standings from the 2019–20 season. Because Team Zacharias ranked 11th on the CTRS and kept at least three of their four players together for the 2020–21 season, they got the second Wild Card spot at the 2021 Scotties in Calgary, Alberta. At the Hearts, they finished with a 3–5 round robin record, failing to qualify for the championship round.

Team Zacharias won their second event of the 2021–22 season, going undefeated to capture the Mother Club Fall Curling Classic. They later had a semifinal finish at the Stu Sells Toronto Tankard after losing to eventual winners Team Hollie Duncan. Because of their successes on tour, Team Zacharias had enough points to qualify for the 2021 Canadian Olympic Curling Pre-Trials. At the Pre-Trials, the team finished the round robin with a 4–2 record. This qualified them for the double knockout round, where they lost both of their games and were eliminated. Elsewhere on tour, the team reached the quarterfinals of the Red Deer Curling Classic and won the MCT Championships in November 2021. At the 2022 Manitoba Scotties Tournament of Hearts in December 2021, Team Zacharias finished with a 3–2 record in their pool, enough to advance to the championship pool. They then won three straight games to finish first overall and earn a bye to the provincial final. In the final, they faced the Kristy Watling rink which they defeated 7–5, earning the right to represent Manitoba at the 2022 Scotties Tournament of Hearts. At the Hearts, the team finished the round robin with a 5–3 record. This qualified them for a tiebreaker against the Northwest Territories' Kerry Galusha, which they lost 8–6 and were eliminated. Team Zacharias played in their first Grand Slam event at the 2022 Players' Championship. There, they posted a 2–3 record, missing the playoffs. They wrapped up their season at the 2022 Best of the West event where they lost in the semifinals to Corryn Brown.

On March 17, 2022, Team Zacharias announced that they would be joining forces with Jennifer Jones for the 2022–23 season. Jones would take over the team as skip, with the four Zacharias members each moving down one position in the lineup. The newly revised Jones lineup found immediate success on tour, winning the 2022 Saville Shoot-Out after an undefeated run. The team then competed in the 2022 PointsBet Invitational single elimination event where they won all four of their games to claim the title. They had three semifinal finishes in a row at the 2022 Curlers Corner Autumn Gold Curling Classic, 2022 Stu Sells 1824 Halifax Classic and the DeKalb Superspiel, losing to Michèle Jäggi, Christina Black and Nancy Martin respectively. At the 2023 Manitoba Scotties Tournament of Hearts, Team Jones went undefeated to win their first provincial title as a new squad. This qualified the team for the 2023 Scotties Tournament of Hearts where after an opening draw loss, they went on a ten game winning streak to qualify for the final where they faced the three-time defending champions in Team Kerri Einarson. Tied 2–2 in the fifth, Jones pulled up light on her final draw which gave Team Canada a steal of two. In the ninth, Jones missed a pivotal freeze which left Einarson with an open hit to count five to secure the win. In Grand Slam play, Team Jones reached the playoffs in four of six events but never made it past the quarterfinal round. Following the season, Mackenzie Zacharias announced she would be stepping back from competitive curling with the remaining Jones members remaining intact.

Team Jones had a strong start to the 2023–24 season, finishing second at the 2023 Saville Shootout after losing to Heather Nedohin (skipping Team Homan) in the final. Jones did not play with the team for the event, however, being replaced by Chelsea Carey. At the 2023 PointsBet Invitational, they could not defend their title, losing in the quarterfinal round to Christina Black. In October, the team played in the first Slam of the season, the 2023 Tour Challenge, where they qualified for the playoffs with a 2–2 record. They then upset the higher seeded Silvana Tirinzoni and Anna Hasselborg rinks in the quarters and semis to reach their first Slam final as a team. Facing Kaitlyn Lawes, the team won the game 7–4, giving Zacharias her first career Slam. In their next event, Carey substituted for Jones again and led the team to another second-place finish at the Stu Sells 1824 Halifax Classic, losing to Tirinzoni in the final. At the next three Slams, the team had two semifinal finishes and one quarterfinal appearance.

New qualifying rules for the Scotties Tournament of Hearts allowed Team Jones a pre-qualifying spot at the 2024 Scotties Tournament of Hearts without having to play in the 2024 playdowns. Days before the event began, Jones announced that at the conclusion of the season she would be retiring from four person curling. At the Hearts, Jones led the team to a 6–2 round robin record, followed by a championship round victory over Alberta. After dropping the 1 vs. 2 game to Rachel Homan, they defeated Kate Cameron in the semifinal to advance to their second straight Scotties final. After Jones got two in the tenth to tie the game at four all, Homan counted one in an extra end for the 5–4 victory. In their final event, Team Jones went 1–4 at the 2024 Players' Championship. After the season, it was announced Chelsea Carey would take over the team as their full-time skip for the 2024–25 season. However, halfway through the 2024-25 season, Burgess announced that she would be leaving the Carey team to pursue other opportunities, and soon after the team formally disbanded.

== Personal life ==
Zacharias attended the University of Manitoba for kinesiology. She currently works as a research assistant in community health sciences at the university. Her sister Mackenzie Zacharias used to play on her team and her father Sheldon used to be their coach.

== Teams ==
Season	Skip	Third	Second	Lead
2015–16	Mackenzie Zacharias	Morgan Reimer	Emily Zacharias	Jenessa Rutter
2016–17	Mackenzie Zacharias	Morgan Reimer	Emily Zacharias	Jenessa Rutter
2017–18	Mackenzie Zacharias	Gaetanne Gauthier	Emily Zacharias	Ashley Groff
2018–19	Mackenzie Zacharias	Lauryn Kuzyk	Emily Zacharias	Caitlyn Labossiere
2019–20	Mackenzie Zacharias	Karlee Burgess	Emily Zacharias	Lauren Lenentine
2020–21	Mackenzie Zacharias	Karlee Burgess	Emily Zacharias	Lauren Lenentine
2021–22	Mackenzie Zacharias	Karlee Burgess	Emily Zacharias	Lauren Lenentine
2022–23	Jennifer Jones	Karlee Burgess	Mackenzie Zacharias	Emily Zacharias / Lauren Lenentine
2023–24	Jennifer Jones	Karlee Burgess	Emily Zacharias	Lauren Lenentine
2024	Chelsea Carey	Karlee Burgess	Emily Zacharias	Lauren Lenentine
