= Karlee Burgess =

Canadian curler (born 1998)

- Curler
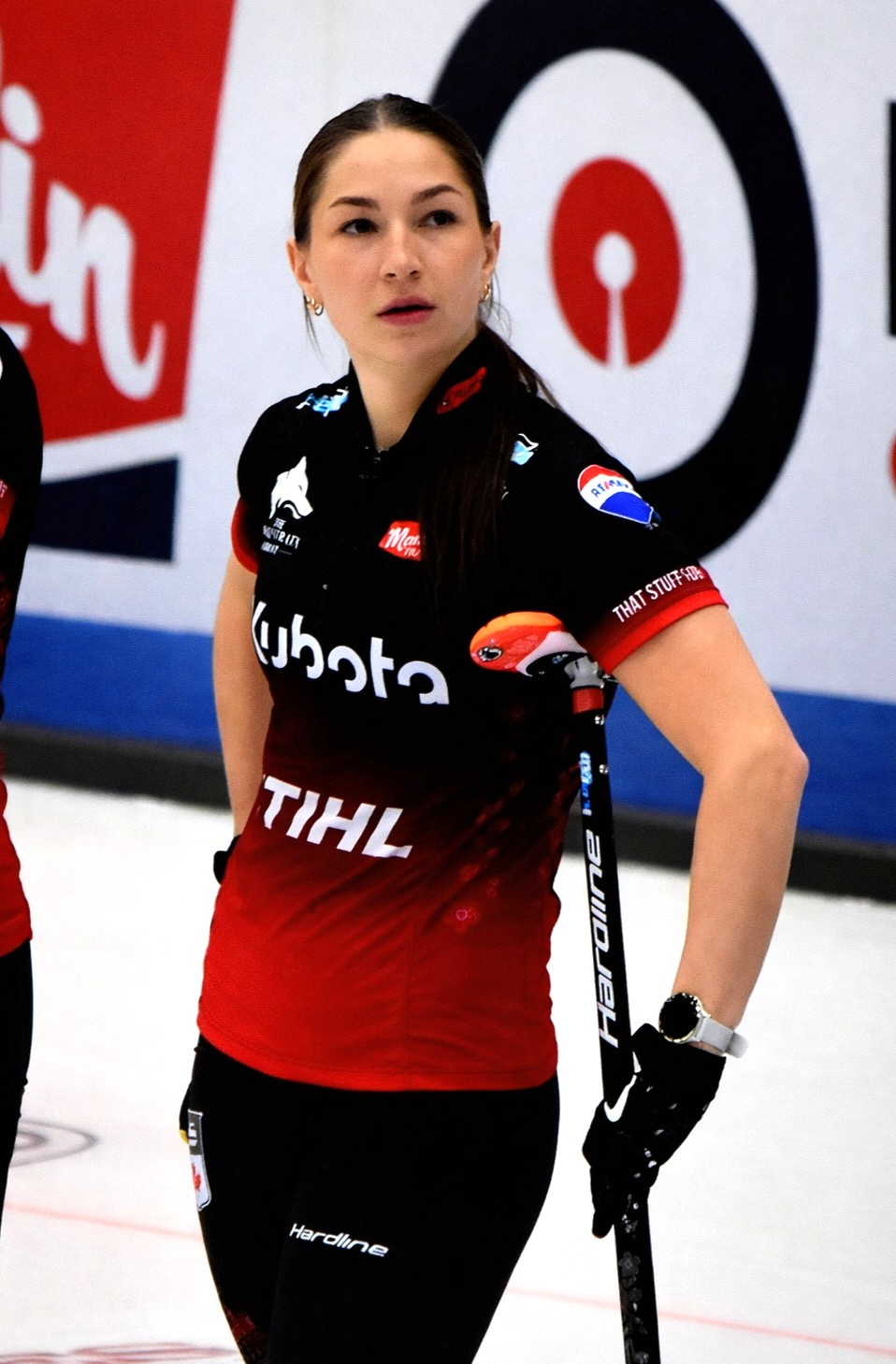
- Burgess at the 2026 Players' Championship
- Born: 14 September 1998 (age 28); Truro, Nova Scotia

Team
- Curling club: Gimli CC, Gimli, Manitoba
- Skip: Kerri Einarson
- Third: Shannon Birchard
- Second: Karlee Burgess
- Lead: Jocelyn Peterman

Curling career
- Member Association: Nova Scotia (2010–2019); Manitoba (2019–present)
- Hearts: 6 (2021, 2022, 2023, 2024, 2025, 2026)
- World Championship: 1 (2026)
- Other appearances: CJCC: 7 (2014, 2015, 2016, 2017, 2018, 2019, 2020)
- Top CTRS ranking: 2nd (2023–24, 2025–26)
- Grand Slam victories: 2 (2023 Tour Challenge, 2026 Invitational)
Medal record
Women's curling
Representing Canada
World Championships
| Silver medal – second place | 2026 Calgary |
World Junior Curling Championships
| Gold medal – first place | 2016 Copenhagen |
| Gold medal – first place | 2018 Aberdeen |
| Gold medal – first place | 2020 Krasnoyarsk |
| Silver medal – second place | 2019 Liverpool |
| Bronze medal – third place | 2017 Gangneung |
Winter Youth Olympics
| Gold medal – first place | 2016 Lillehammer |
Scotties Tournament of Hearts
| Gold medal – first place | 2026 Mississauga |
Representing Manitoba
Canadian Olympic Curling Trials
| Bronze medal – third place | 2025 Halifax |
Scotties Tournament of Hearts
| Silver medal – second place | 2023 Kamloops |
| Silver medal – second place | 2024 Calgary |
| Silver medal – second place | 2025 Thunder Bay |
Representing Nova Scotia
Canada Winter Games
| Silver medal – second place | 2015 Prince George |

Karlee Burgess (born September 14, 1998) is a Canadian curler from Winnipeg, Manitoba. She currently plays second on Team Kerri Einarson, winning her first women's national championship with the team at the 2026 Scotties Tournament of Hearts. Burgess is also a three-time world junior champion, winning gold in 2016, 2018 and 2020.

== Career ==
=== Juniors ===
At just 15 years old, Burgess played second for the Mary Fay rink along with, Jenn Smith and Janique LeBlanc and won the 2014 Nova Scotia Junior women's championship. They were the youngest team to win in 20 years., sending the four-some to the 2014 Canadian Junior Curling Championships to represent Nova Scotia. Despite their youth, the team finished with an 8–2 record, making the playoffs. The team would go on to lose to British Columbia, skipped by Kalia Van Osch in the semi-final, winning a bronze medal. The next year, the Fay rink won their second U21 Nova Scotia Provincials, earning the right to represent Nova Scotia at their second back-to-back Canadian Junior Curling Championship. The rink fell one step shorter than their previous year, finishing in a tie for fourth place with a 6–4 record. The Fay rink then qualified for the 2016 Canadian Juniors with their third provincial title. The rink finished in first place after the round robin with a 9–1 record, earning the rink a direct bye to the finals. In the finals, she played the British Columbia rink, this time skipped by Sarah Daniels, and won her first Canadian Junior title by defeating the British Columbia rink 9–5, and therefore representing Canada at the 2016 World Juniors in Copenhagen, Denmark.

Team Fay also won three Under-15 provincial championships and won the 2013 Under-18 provincial championships, as well as the 2013 U-18 Atlantics. They represented Nova Scotia at the 2015 Canada Winter Games after beating club mate Cassie Cocks 7–3 in the provincial final. While at the games Burgess and her Nova Scotian team went undefeated through the Round Robin, finishing with a perfect 5–0 record. According to the announcers when their game against Manitoba was televised on TSN, the Fay rink had the highest player percentages at every position and the highest team percentage after the first two draws. Their perfect record in the Round Robin earned them a bye to the Semi Finals. They once again played New Brunswick's Justine Comeau, after defeating her 7–5 in the Round Robin, and won on the last rock in the last end in a 7-6 decision. They went on to play Ontario in the Gold Medal Game, in which they lost 6–5 in an extra end. Jenn Smith and the Fay rink then parted ways after the completion of the 2014–15 season.

Burgess and skip, Mary Fay along with B.C. curlers Tyler Tardi and Sterling Middleton would later be selected from curlers who competed in the Canada Winter Games to represent Canada in the 2016 Youth Olympics in Lillehammer, Norway. The rink, skipped by Mary Fay went undefeated in the tournament, winning the gold medal after a resounding 10–4 win against the United States of America in the final.

The Fay rink would play in their first World Curling Tour event at the 2014 Gibson's Cashspiel, where they lost in the final to Mary-Anne Arsenault.

For the 2019–20 season, she and teammate Lauren Lenentine moved to Manitoba to join the Zacharias siblings Mackenzie and Emily to try to return to the World Juniors. The team won the Manitoba Junior Provincials, qualifying for the national championship. The team went on to win the 2020 Canadian Junior Curling Championships and later the 2020 World Junior Curling Championships.

=== Women's ===
Due to the COVID-19 pandemic in Canada, many provinces had to cancel their provincial championships, with member associations selecting their representatives for the 2021 Scotties Tournament of Hearts. Due to this situation, Curling Canada added three Wild Card teams to the national championship, which were based on the CTRS standings from the 2019–20 season. Because Team Zacharias ranked 11th on the CTRS and kept at least three of their four players together for the 2020–21 season, they got the second Wild Card spot at the 2021 Scotties in Calgary, Alberta. At the Hearts, they finished with a 3–5 round robin record, failing to qualify for the championship round.

Team Zacharias won their second event of the 2021–22 season, going undefeated to capture the Mother Club Fall Curling Classic. They later had a semifinal finish at the Stu Sells Toronto Tankard after losing to eventual winners Team Hollie Duncan. Because of their successes on tour, Team Zacharias had enough points to qualify for the 2021 Canadian Olympic Curling Pre-Trials. At the Pre-Trials, the team finished the round robin with a 4–2 record. This qualified them for the double knockout round, where they lost both of their games and were eliminated. Elsewhere on tour, the team reached the quarterfinals of the Red Deer Curling Classic and won the MCT Championships in November 2021. At the 2022 Manitoba Scotties Tournament of Hearts in December 2021, Team Zacharias finished with a 3–2 record in their pool, enough to advance to the championship pool. They then won three straight games to finish first overall and earn a bye to the provincial final. In the final, they faced the Kristy Watling rink which they defeated 7–5, earning the right to represent Manitoba at the 2022 Scotties Tournament of Hearts. At the Hearts, the team finished the round robin with a 5–3 record. This qualified them for a tiebreaker against the Northwest Territories' Kerry Galusha, which they lost 8–6 and were eliminated. Team Zacharias played in their first Grand Slam event at the 2022 Players' Championship. There, they posted a 2–3 record, missing the playoffs. They wrapped up their season at the 2022 Best of the West event where they lost in the semifinals to Corryn Brown.

On March 17, 2022, Team Zacharias announced that they would be joining forces with Jennifer Jones for the 2022–23 season. Jones would take over the team as skip, with the four Zacharias members each moving down one position in the lineup. The newly revised Jones lineup found immediate success on tour, winning the 2022 Saville Shoot-Out after an undefeated run. The team then competed in the 2022 PointsBet Invitational single elimination event where they won all four of their games to claim the title. They had three semifinal finishes in a row at the 2022 Curlers Corner Autumn Gold Curling Classic, 2022 Stu Sells 1824 Halifax Classic and the DeKalb Superspiel, losing to Michèle Jäggi, Christina Black and Nancy Martin respectively. At the 2023 Manitoba Scotties Tournament of Hearts, Team Jones went undefeated to win their first provincial title as a new squad. This qualified the team for the 2023 Scotties Tournament of Hearts where after an opening draw loss, they went on a ten-game winning streak to qualify for the final where they faced the three-time defending champions in Team Kerri Einarson. Tied 2–2 in the fifth, Jones pulled up light on her final draw which gave Team Canada a steal of two. In the ninth, Jones missed a pivotal freeze which left Einarson with an open hit to count five to secure the win. In Grand Slam play, Team Jones reached the playoffs in four of six events but never made it past the quarterfinal round. Following the season, Mackenzie Zacharias announced she would be stepping back from competitive curling with the remaining Jones members remaining intact.

Team Jones had a strong start to the 2023–24 season, finishing second at the 2023 Saville Shootout after losing to Heather Nedohin (skipping Team Homan) in the final. Jones did not play with the team for the event, however, being replaced by Chelsea Carey. At the 2023 PointsBet Invitational, they could not defend their title, losing in the quarterfinal round to Christina Black. In October, the team played in the first Slam of the season, the 2023 Tour Challenge, where they qualified for the playoffs with a 2–2 record. They then upset the higher seeded Silvana Tirinzoni and Anna Hasselborg rinks in the quarters and semis to reach their first Slam final as a team. Facing Kaitlyn Lawes, the team won the game 7–4, giving Burgess her first career Slam. In their next event, Carey substituted for Jones again and led the team to another second-place finish at the Stu Sells 1824 Halifax Classic, losing to Tirinzoni in the final. At the next three Slams, the team had two semifinal finishes and one quarterfinal appearance.

New qualifying rules for the Scotties Tournament of Hearts allowed Team Jones a pre-qualifying spot at the 2024 Scotties Tournament of Hearts without having to play in the 2024 playdowns. Days before the event began, Jones announced that at the conclusion of the season she would be retiring from four person curling. At the Hearts, Jones led the team to a 6–2 round robin record, followed by a championship round victory over Alberta. After dropping the 1 vs. 2 game to Rachel Homan, they defeated Kate Cameron in the semifinal to advance to their second straight Scotties final. After Jones got two in the tenth to tie the game at four all, Homan counted one in an extra end for the 5–4 victory. In their final event, Team Jones went 1–4 at the 2024 Players' Championship. After the season, it was announced Chelsea Carey would take over the team as their full-time skip for the 2024–25 curling season. However, halfway through the 2024–25 season, Burgess announced that she would be leaving the Carey team to pursue other opportunities.

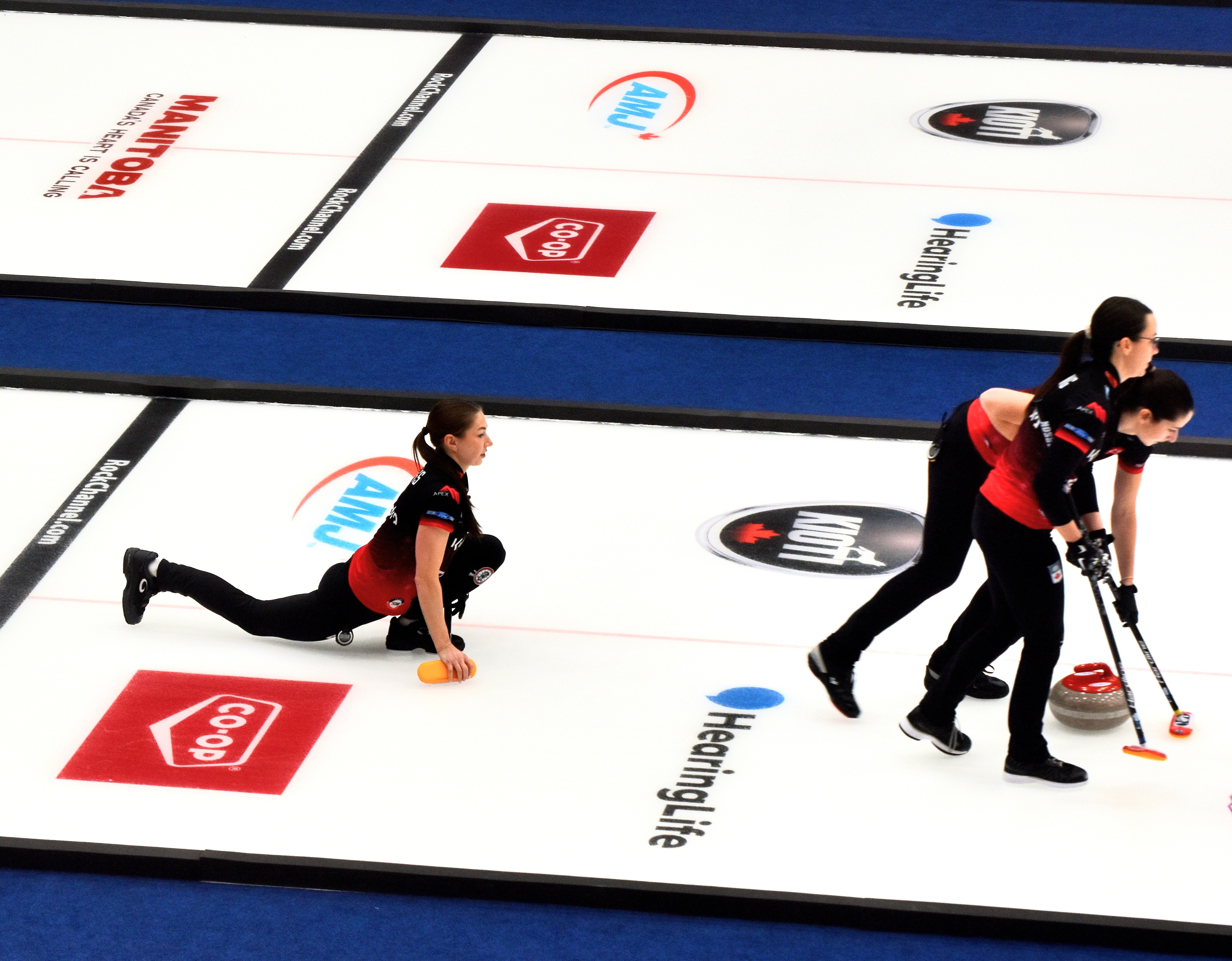
Burgess watches her shot at the 2026 Players' Championship.

Burgess, after leaving the Carey rink halfway through the 2024–25 curling season, would announce that she would be joining the Kerri Einarson rink for the rest of the season, replacing Shannon Birchard, who was out for the season due to a knee injury. Burgess would play with Einarson at the 2025 Scotties Tournament of Hearts, where Burgess would again finish in second place, losing to Team Homan 6–1 in the final. At the end of the season, after Birchard recovered from her injury, Einarson announced for the 2025-26 curling season that Birchard would remain as second, with Burgess throwing lead stones, Krysten Karwacki being the alternate, and Val Sweeting continuing to be the third. In their first event of the season, Einarson would win the 2025 Saville Shootout, beating Gim Eun-ji in the final. Einarson would then compete at the 2025 Canadian Olympic Curling Trials, finishing the round robin with a 6–1 record, qualifying for the playoffs. Einarson would then lose to Nova Scotia's Christina Black 6–3 in the semifinals, finishing in 3rd place. Team Einarson would rebound by winning the 2026 Scotties Tournament of Hearts, beating Manitoba's Kaitlyn Lawes 4–3 in the final, and represent Canada at the 2026 World Women's Curling Championship. There, they would finish round-robin play with a 10–2 record, finishing second and qualifying for the semifinals. Burgess would also be named to the "All-Star Team" at the event as the top lead in player percentages, curling 93.6% in the round-robin. After being Japan in the semifinal, Einarson would go on to win the silver medal, losing to Switzerland's Xenia Schwaller 7–5 in the final. At the end of the season, Team Einarson announced that they had "parted ways" with third Sweeting, alternate Karwacki, and coach Reid Carruthers. They would later add two-time Olympian Jocelyn Peterman to the lineup as lead, with Burgess now as second and Birchard as third.

== Personal life ==
Burgess was a kinesiology student at Dalhousie University, and attended the University of Manitoba. She currently works as a conductive education assistant/fundraising coordinator at Movement Centre of Manitoba. She is in a relationship with fellow curler Jacques Gauthier.

== Teams ==
| Season | Skip | Third | Second | Lead |
|---|---|---|---|---|
| 2010–11 | Mary Fay | Jenn Smith | Karlee Burgess | Janique LeBlanc |
| 2011–12 | Mary Fay | Jenn Smith | Karlee Burgess | Janique LeBlanc |
| 2012–13 | Mary Fay | Jenn Smith | Karlee Burgess | Janique LeBlanc |
| 2013–14 | Mary Fay | Jenn Smith | Karlee Burgess | Janique LeBlanc |
| 2014–15 | Mary Fay | Jenn Smith | Karlee Burgess | Janique LeBlanc |
| 2015–16 | Mary Fay | Kristin Clarke | Karlee Burgess | Janique LeBlanc |
| 2016–17 | Kristin Clarke | Karlee Burgess | Janique LeBlanc | Emily Lloyd |
| 2017–18 | Kaitlyn Jones | Kristin Clarke | Karlee Burgess | Lindsey Burgess |
| 2018–19 | Kaitlyn Jones | Lauren Lenentine | Karlee Burgess | Lindsey Burgess |
| 2019–20 | Mackenzie Zacharias | Karlee Burgess | Emily Zacharias | Lauren Lenentine |
| 2020–21 | Mackenzie Zacharias | Karlee Burgess | Emily Zacharias | Lauren Lenentine |
| 2021–22 | Mackenzie Zacharias | Karlee Burgess | Emily Zacharias | Lauren Lenentine |
| 2022–23 | Jennifer Jones | Karlee Burgess | Mackenzie Zacharias | Emily Zacharias / Lauren Lenentine |
| 2023–24 | Jennifer Jones | Karlee Burgess | Emily Zacharias | Lauren Lenentine |
| 2024 | Chelsea Carey | Karlee Burgess | Emily Zacharias | Lauren Lenentine |
| 2025 | Kerri Einarson | Val Sweeting | Karlee Burgess | Krysten Karwacki |
| 2025–26 | Kerri Einarson | Val Sweeting | Shannon Birchard | Karlee Burgess |
| 2026–27 | Kerri Einarson | Shannon Birchard | Karlee Burgess | Jocelyn Peterman |
