= 2026 Canadian Mixed Curling Championship =

- Host city: Woodstock, Prince Edward Island
- Arena: West Prince Curling Club
- Dates: November 8–14
- Winner: Nova Scotia
- Curling club: Halifax CC, Halifax
- Skip: Brent MacDougall
- Third: Erin Carmody
- Second: Scott Weagle
- Lead: Marie Christianson
- Finalist: New Brunswick (Quillian)

The 2026 Canadian Mixed Curling Championship was being held from November 8 to 14 at the West Prince Curling Club in Woodstock, Prince Edward Island.

The 2026 event marked the fourth time Prince Edward Island hosted the Canadian Mixed Championship and the first time since 1996 three decades prior.

== Teams ==
The teams are listed as follows:

| Team | Skip | Third | Second | Lead | Locale |
|---|---|---|---|---|---|
| Alberta | Andrew Hodgson | Stephanie Todd | Michael Dumont | Renee Michaud | Airdrie CC, Airdrie |
| British Columbia | Joshua Miki | Sarah Wong | Matthew Fenton | Amanda Wong | Peach Arch CC, White Rock |
| Manitoba | Colin Kurz | Meghan Walter | Brendan Bilawka | Mackenzie Elias | Deer Lodge CC, Winnipeg |
| New Brunswick | Sylvie Quillian | Marcel Robichaud | Lynn LeBlanc | Jordan Pinder | Curl Moncton, Moncton |
| Newfoundland and Labrador | Scott Eaton | Sarah McNeil Lamswood | Evan Kearley | Alexandra Sweetman | RE/MAX Centre, St. John's |
| Northern Ontario | Bryan Burgess | Oye-Sem Won | Mike McCarville | Rebecca Carr | Fort William CC, Thunder Bay |
| Northwest Territories | Betti Delorey | D’arcy Delorey | Halli-Rai Delorey | Glen Tingmiak | Hay River CC, Hay River |
| Nova Scotia | Brent MacDougall | Erin Carmody | Scott Weagle | Marie Christianson | Halifax CC, Halifax |
| Nunavut | Peter Mackey | Geneva Chislett | Jeff Nadeau | Robyn Mackey | Iqaluit CC, Iqaluit |
| Ontario | Cory Heggestad | Heather Heggestad | Shane Konings | Lauren Wasylkiw | Stroud CC, Innisfil |
| Prince Edward Island | Adam Arsenault | Breanne Burgoyne | Jamie Stride | Terri Wood | Crapaud CC, Crapaud |
| Quebec | Félix Asselin | Laurie St-Georges | Émile Asselin | Emily Riley | Glenmore CC, Dollard-des-Ormeaux |
| Saskatchewan | Tyler Hartung | Christie Gamble | Jayden Shwaga | Stasia Wisniewski | Highland CC, Regina |
| Yukon | Scott Williamson | Laura Williamson | Raphael Lavigne | Laura Wilson | Whitehorse CC, Whitehorse |

== Round robin standings ==
Final Round Robin Standings

Key
| Teams to Championship Pool |

| Pool A | Skip | W | L | W–L |
|---|---|---|---|---|
| Quebec | Félix Asselin | 6 | 0 | – |
| Northern Ontario | Bryan Burgess | 5 | 1 | – |
| Saskatchewan | Tyler Hartung | 3 | 3 | 1–0 |
| Alberta | Andrew Hodgson | 3 | 3 | 0–1 |
| Newfoundland and Labrador | Scott Eaton | 2 | 4 | 1–0 |
| Ontario | Cory Heggestad | 2 | 4 | 0–1 |
| Nunavut | Peter Mackey | 0 | 6 | – |

| Pool B | Skip | W | L | W–L |
|---|---|---|---|---|
| Nova Scotia | Brent MacDougall | 5 | 1 | 1–1 |
| New Brunswick | Sylvie Quillian | 5 | 1 | 1–1 |
| British Columbia | Joshua Miki | 5 | 1 | 1–1 |
| Manitoba | Colin Kurz | 3 | 3 | – |
| Prince Edward Island | Adam Arsenault | 2 | 4 | – |
| Northwest Territories | Betti Delorey | 1 | 5 | – |
| Yukon | Scott Williamson | 0 | 6 | – |

== Round robin results ==
All draws are listed in Atlantic Time (UTC−03:00).

=== Draw 1 ===
Sunday, November 8, 12:30 pm

| Sheet A | 1 | 2 | 3 | 4 | 5 | 6 | 7 | 8 | Final |
| Saskatchewan (Hartung) | 0 | 0 | 0 | 3 | 0 | 0 | 0 | 1 | 4 |
| Quebec (Asselin) 🔨 | 0 | 0 | 1 | 0 | 2 | 1 | 2 | 0 | 6 |

| Sheet B | 1 | 2 | 3 | 4 | 5 | 6 | 7 | 8 | Final |
| Ontario (Heggestad) | 0 | 0 | 1 | 0 | 0 | 2 | 0 | 0 | 3 |
| Newfoundland and Labrador (Eaton) 🔨 | 1 | 1 | 0 | 1 | 0 | 0 | 1 | 1 | 5 |

| Sheet C | 1 | 2 | 3 | 4 | 5 | 6 | 7 | 8 | Final |
| Prince Edward Island (Arsenault) 🔨 | 0 | 1 | 0 | 1 | 1 | 1 | 0 | X | 4 |
| New Brunswick (Quillian) | 2 | 0 | 3 | 0 | 0 | 0 | 2 | X | 7 |

| Sheet D | 1 | 2 | 3 | 4 | 5 | 6 | 7 | 8 | Final |
| British Columbia (Miki) | 2 | 0 | 0 | 1 | 1 | 0 | 1 | X | 5 |
| Yukon (Williamson) 🔨 | 0 | 1 | 0 | 0 | 0 | 0 | 0 | X | 1 |

=== Draw 2 ===
Sunday, November 8, 5:30 pm

| Sheet A | 1 | 2 | 3 | 4 | 5 | 6 | 7 | 8 | Final |
| Northern Ontario (Burgess) | 0 | 1 | 2 | 0 | 2 | 0 | 1 | X | 6 |
| Nunavut (Mackey) 🔨 | 1 | 0 | 0 | 1 | 0 | 1 | 0 | X | 3 |

| Sheet B | 1 | 2 | 3 | 4 | 5 | 6 | 7 | 8 | Final |
| Alberta (Hodgson) | 0 | 1 | 0 | 0 | 1 | 1 | 1 | 0 | 4 |
| Saskatchewan (Hartung) 🔨 | 2 | 0 | 2 | 1 | 0 | 0 | 0 | 2 | 7 |

| Sheet C | 1 | 2 | 3 | 4 | 5 | 6 | 7 | 8 | Final |
| Nova Scotia (MacDougall) 🔨 | 0 | 0 | 3 | 0 | 0 | 3 | 0 | 1 | 7 |
| Northwest Territories (Delorey) | 0 | 1 | 0 | 1 | 1 | 0 | 1 | 0 | 4 |

| Sheet D | 1 | 2 | 3 | 4 | 5 | 6 | 7 | 8 | Final |
| Manitoba (Kurz) 🔨 | 0 | 2 | 2 | 0 | 2 | 0 | 1 | 1 | 8 |
| Prince Edward Island (Arsenault) | 2 | 0 | 0 | 1 | 0 | 2 | 0 | 0 | 5 |

=== Draw 3 ===
Monday, November 9, 10:00 am

| Sheet B | 1 | 2 | 3 | 4 | 5 | 6 | 7 | 8 | Final |
| Quebec (Asselin) | 0 | 4 | 3 | 0 | 0 | 0 | 1 | 1 | 9 |
| Northern Ontario (Burgess) 🔨 | 2 | 0 | 0 | 0 | 3 | 1 | 0 | 0 | 6 |

| Sheet C | 1 | 2 | 3 | 4 | 5 | 6 | 7 | 8 | Final |
| Yukon (Williamson) | 0 | 2 | 0 | 1 | 0 | 0 | 1 | X | 4 |
| Manitoba (Kurz) 🔨 | 3 | 0 | 2 | 0 | 1 | 2 | 0 | X | 8 |

=== Draw 4 ===
Monday, November 9, 2:00 pm

| Sheet A | 1 | 2 | 3 | 4 | 5 | 6 | 7 | 8 | Final |
| New Brunswick (Quillian) 🔨 | 0 | 2 | 0 | 1 | 0 | 0 | 0 | X | 3 |
| British Columbia (Miki) | 0 | 0 | 1 | 0 | 3 | 1 | 1 | X | 6 |

| Sheet B | 1 | 2 | 3 | 4 | 5 | 6 | 7 | 8 | 9 | Final |
| Northwest Territories (Delorey) | 0 | 2 | 1 | 0 | 0 | 2 | 1 | 1 | 0 | 7 |
| Prince Edward Island (Arsenault) 🔨 | 4 | 0 | 0 | 0 | 3 | 0 | 0 | 0 | 1 | 8 |

| Sheet C | 1 | 2 | 3 | 4 | 5 | 6 | 7 | 8 | Final |
| Newfoundland and Labrador (Eaton) 🔨 | 1 | 0 | 1 | 0 | 1 | 0 | 0 | 0 | 3 |
| Saskatchewan (Hartung) | 0 | 1 | 0 | 3 | 0 | 0 | 2 | 1 | 7 |

| Sheet D | 1 | 2 | 3 | 4 | 5 | 6 | 7 | 8 | Final |
| Nunavut (Mackey) | 0 | 1 | 0 | 1 | 0 | 0 | X | X | 2 |
| Ontario (Heggestad) 🔨 | 4 | 0 | 2 | 0 | 2 | 1 | X | X | 9 |

=== Draw 5 ===
Monday, November 9, 6:00 pm

| Sheet A | 1 | 2 | 3 | 4 | 5 | 6 | 7 | 8 | Final |
| Alberta (Hodgson) 🔨 | 3 | 0 | 0 | 0 | 0 | 1 | 1 | 1 | 6 |
| Ontario (Heggestad) | 0 | 2 | 1 | 0 | 2 | 0 | 0 | 0 | 5 |

| Sheet B | 1 | 2 | 3 | 4 | 5 | 6 | 7 | 8 | Final |
| Newfoundland and Labrador (Eaton) 🔨 | 0 | 2 | 0 | 1 | 0 | 2 | 0 | 1 | 6 |
| Nunavut (Mackey) | 1 | 0 | 1 | 0 | 1 | 0 | 1 | 0 | 4 |

| Sheet C | 1 | 2 | 3 | 4 | 5 | 6 | 7 | 8 | Final |
| British Columbia (Miki) | 0 | 2 | 0 | 2 | 0 | 0 | 0 | 1 | 5 |
| Nova Scotia (MacDougall) 🔨 | 1 | 0 | 2 | 0 | 1 | 2 | 1 | 0 | 7 |

| Sheet D | 1 | 2 | 3 | 4 | 5 | 6 | 7 | 8 | Final |
| New Brunswick (Quillian) 🔨 | 2 | 1 | 3 | 6 | 0 | 2 | X | X | 14 |
| Northwest Territories (Delorey) | 0 | 0 | 0 | 0 | 1 | 0 | X | X | 1 |

=== Draw 6 ===
Tuesday, November 10, 10:00 am

| Sheet A | 1 | 2 | 3 | 4 | 5 | 6 | 7 | 8 | Final |
| Prince Edward Island (Arsenault) | 0 | 5 | 0 | 0 | 2 | 0 | 1 | X | 8 |
| Yukon (Williamson) 🔨 | 2 | 0 | 1 | 1 | 0 | 1 | 0 | X | 5 |

| Sheet B | 1 | 2 | 3 | 4 | 5 | 6 | 7 | 8 | Final |
| Nova Scotia (MacDougall) | 0 | 3 | 0 | 1 | 0 | 4 | 3 | X | 11 |
| Manitoba (Kurz) 🔨 | 3 | 0 | 0 | 0 | 1 | 0 | 0 | X | 4 |

| Sheet C | 1 | 2 | 3 | 4 | 5 | 6 | 7 | 8 | Final |
| Quebec (Asselin) | 1 | 0 | 0 | 3 | 0 | 2 | 0 | X | 6 |
| Nunavut (Mackey) 🔨 | 0 | 0 | 1 | 0 | 1 | 0 | 1 | X | 3 |

| Sheet D | 1 | 2 | 3 | 4 | 5 | 6 | 7 | 8 | Final |
| Northern Ontario (Burgess) | 0 | 0 | 1 | 0 | 3 | 0 | 2 | X | 6 |
| Newfoundland and Labrador (Eaton) 🔨 | 0 | 1 | 0 | 1 | 0 | 2 | 0 | X | 4 |

=== Draw 7 ===
Tuesday, November 10, 2:00 pm

| Sheet A | 1 | 2 | 3 | 4 | 5 | 6 | 7 | 8 | Final |
| Northwest Territories (Delorey) | 0 | 0 | 0 | 0 | 1 | 0 | 2 | X | 3 |
| Manitoba (Kurz) 🔨 | 0 | 3 | 0 | 1 | 0 | 1 | 0 | X | 5 |

| Sheet B | 1 | 2 | 3 | 4 | 5 | 6 | 7 | 8 | Final |
| Saskatchewan (Hartung) 🔨 | 0 | 1 | 0 | 0 | 0 | 0 | 1 | 0 | 2 |
| Ontario (Heggestad) | 0 | 0 | 0 | 2 | 1 | 0 | 0 | 2 | 5 |

| Sheet C | 1 | 2 | 3 | 4 | 5 | 6 | 7 | 8 | Final |
| Alberta (Hodgson) | 0 | 2 | 1 | 1 | 0 | 4 | X | X | 8 |
| Newfoundland and Labrador (Eaton) 🔨 | 2 | 0 | 0 | 0 | 1 | 0 | X | X | 3 |

| Sheet D | 1 | 2 | 3 | 4 | 5 | 6 | 7 | 8 | 9 | Final |
| Nova Scotia (MacDougall) 🔨 | 0 | 0 | 1 | 1 | 0 | 1 | 0 | 1 | 0 | 4 |
| New Brunswick (Quillian) | 0 | 1 | 0 | 0 | 2 | 0 | 1 | 0 | 1 | 5 |

=== Draw 8 ===
Tuesday, November 10, 6:00 pm

| Sheet A | 1 | 2 | 3 | 4 | 5 | 6 | 7 | 8 | Final |
| Quebec (Asselin) | 1 | 1 | 0 | 2 | 3 | 0 | X | X | 7 |
| Alberta (Hodgson) 🔨 | 0 | 0 | 2 | 0 | 0 | 2 | X | X | 3 |

| Sheet B | 1 | 2 | 3 | 4 | 5 | 6 | 7 | 8 | Final |
| New Brunswick (Quillian) | 3 | 0 | 1 | 0 | 2 | 3 | X | X | 9 |
| Yukon (Williamson) 🔨 | 0 | 1 | 0 | 1 | 0 | 0 | X | X | 2 |

| Sheet C | 1 | 2 | 3 | 4 | 5 | 6 | 7 | 8 | Final |
| Saskatchewan (Hartung) 🔨 | 2 | 0 | 1 | 0 | 0 | 1 | 0 | 1 | 5 |
| Northern Ontario (Burgess) | 0 | 2 | 0 | 2 | 1 | 0 | 1 | 0 | 6 |

| Sheet D | 1 | 2 | 3 | 4 | 5 | 6 | 7 | 8 | Final |
| Northwest Territories (Delorey) | 0 | 0 | 1 | 0 | 0 | 0 | X | X | 1 |
| British Columbia (Miki) 🔨 | 0 | 1 | 0 | 3 | 2 | 1 | X | X | 7 |

=== Draw 9 ===
Wednesday, November 11, 10:00 am

| Sheet A | 1 | 2 | 3 | 4 | 5 | 6 | 7 | 8 | Final |
| Yukon (Williamson) | 0 | 0 | 0 | 0 | 2 | 0 | X | X | 2 |
| Nova Scotia (MacDougall) 🔨 | 1 | 2 | 0 | 2 | 0 | 3 | X | X | 8 |

| Sheet B | 1 | 2 | 3 | 4 | 5 | 6 | 7 | 8 | Final |
| Nunavut (Mackey) | 1 | 0 | 0 | 0 | 1 | 0 | X | X | 2 |
| Alberta (Hodgson) 🔨 | 0 | 2 | 2 | 3 | 0 | 4 | X | X | 11 |

| Sheet C | 1 | 2 | 3 | 4 | 5 | 6 | 7 | 8 | 9 | Final |
| Manitoba (Kurz) 🔨 | 2 | 0 | 4 | 0 | 1 | 0 | 1 | 0 | 0 | 8 |
| British Columbia (Miki) | 0 | 2 | 0 | 2 | 0 | 2 | 0 | 2 | 1 | 9 |

| Sheet D | 1 | 2 | 3 | 4 | 5 | 6 | 7 | 8 | Final |
| Ontario (Heggestad) | 1 | 0 | 0 | 2 | 0 | 0 | 1 | 0 | 4 |
| Northern Ontario (Burgess) 🔨 | 0 | 1 | 0 | 0 | 2 | 1 | 0 | 1 | 5 |

=== Draw 10 ===
Wednesday, November 11, 2:00 pm

| Sheet A | 1 | 2 | 3 | 4 | 5 | 6 | 7 | 8 | Final |
| British Columbia (Miki) 🔨 | 1 | 0 | 1 | 0 | 3 | 0 | 1 | X | 6 |
| Prince Edward Island (Arsenault) | 0 | 2 | 0 | 1 | 0 | 1 | 0 | X | 4 |

| Sheet B | 1 | 2 | 3 | 4 | 5 | 6 | 7 | 8 | Final |
| Yukon (Williamson) | 0 | 0 | 0 | 1 | 1 | 1 | 0 | 1 | 4 |
| Northwest Territories (Delorey) 🔨 | 2 | 1 | 2 | 0 | 0 | 0 | 1 | 0 | 6 |

| Sheet C | 1 | 2 | 3 | 4 | 5 | 6 | 7 | 8 | Final |
| Northern Ontario (Burgess) | 0 | 0 | 1 | 0 | 0 | 0 | 0 | 3 | 4 |
| Alberta (Hodgson) 🔨 | 0 | 1 | 0 | 1 | 0 | 0 | 0 | 0 | 2 |

| Sheet D | 1 | 2 | 3 | 4 | 5 | 6 | 7 | 8 | Final |
| Newfoundland and Labrador (Eaton) | 0 | 0 | 1 | 0 | 1 | 0 | 1 | 0 | 3 |
| Quebec (Asselin) 🔨 | 0 | 1 | 0 | 1 | 0 | 1 | 0 | 2 | 5 |

=== Draw 11 ===
Wednesday, November 11, 6:00 pm

| Sheet A | 1 | 2 | 3 | 4 | 5 | 6 | 7 | 8 | Final |
| Nunavut (Mackey) | 0 | 0 | 2 | 0 | 1 | 0 | X | X | 3 |
| Saskatchewan (Hartung) 🔨 | 3 | 3 | 0 | 2 | 0 | 0 | X | X | 8 |

| Sheet B | 1 | 2 | 3 | 4 | 5 | 6 | 7 | 8 | Final |
| Manitoba (Kurz) | 1 | 0 | 0 | 1 | 0 | 1 | 1 | 0 | 4 |
| New Brunswick (Quillian) 🔨 | 0 | 2 | 1 | 0 | 2 | 0 | 0 | 1 | 6 |

| Sheet C | 1 | 2 | 3 | 4 | 5 | 6 | 7 | 8 | Final |
| Ontario (Heggestad) | 0 | 1 | 0 | 0 | 1 | 0 | 1 | 0 | 3 |
| Quebec (Asselin) 🔨 | 0 | 0 | 1 | 3 | 0 | 2 | 0 | 1 | 7 |

| Sheet D | 1 | 2 | 3 | 4 | 5 | 6 | 7 | 8 | Final |
| Prince Edward Island (Arsenault) | 0 | 1 | 0 | 1 | 0 | 1 | 0 | 1 | 4 |
| Nova Scotia (MacDougall) 🔨 | 1 | 0 | 3 | 0 | 2 | 0 | 1 | 0 | 7 |

== Seeding pool ==
=== Standings ===
Final Seeding Pool Standings

| Team | Skip | W | L | W–L |
|---|---|---|---|---|
| Newfoundland and Labrador | Scott Eaton | 5 | 4 | 1–0 |
| Ontario | Cory Heggestad | 5 | 4 | 0–1 |
| Prince Edward Island | Adam Arsenault | 3 | 6 | – |
| Yukon | Scott Williamson | 1 | 8 | 1–1 |
| Nunavut | Peter Mackey | 1 | 8 | 1–1 |
| Northwest Territories | Betti Delorey | 1 | 8 | 1–1 |

=== Results ===
==== Draw 12 ====
Thursday, November 12, 9:00 am

| Sheet A | 1 | 2 | 3 | 4 | 5 | 6 | 7 | 8 | Final |
| Nunavut (Mackey) 🔨 | 0 | 1 | 0 | 2 | 0 | 0 | 0 | X | 3 |
| Prince Edward Island (Arsenault) | 1 | 0 | 3 | 0 | 1 | 1 | 3 | X | 9 |

| Sheet B | 1 | 2 | 3 | 4 | 5 | 6 | 7 | 8 | Final |
| Ontario (Heggestad) 🔨 | 1 | 2 | 0 | 5 | 0 | 0 | X | X | 8 |
| Northwest Territories (Delorey) | 0 | 0 | 1 | 0 | 1 | 1 | X | X | 3 |

| Sheet C | 1 | 2 | 3 | 4 | 5 | 6 | 7 | 8 | Final |
| Newfoundland and Labrador (Eaton) | 0 | 1 | 0 | 3 | 1 | 1 | 0 | X | 6 |
| Yukon (Williamson) 🔨 | 1 | 0 | 1 | 0 | 0 | 0 | 1 | X | 3 |

==== Draw 14 ====
Thursday, November 12, 4:00 pm

| Sheet B | 1 | 2 | 3 | 4 | 5 | 6 | 7 | 8 | Final |
| Newfoundland and Labrador (Eaton) 🔨 | 2 | 1 | 1 | 0 | 0 | 0 | 4 | X | 8 |
| Prince Edward Island (Arsenault) | 0 | 0 | 0 | 0 | 1 | 1 | 0 | X | 2 |

| Sheet C | 1 | 2 | 3 | 4 | 5 | 6 | 7 | 8 | Final |
| Northwest Territories (Delorey) 🔨 | 0 | 2 | 1 | 0 | 0 | 2 | 0 | X | 5 |
| Nunavut (Mackey) | 4 | 0 | 0 | 3 | 1 | 0 | 1 | X | 9 |

| Sheet D | 1 | 2 | 3 | 4 | 5 | 6 | 7 | 8 | Final |
| Yukon (Williamson) | 0 | 1 | 0 | 1 | 0 | 0 | X | X | 2 |
| Ontario (Heggestad) 🔨 | 3 | 0 | 6 | 0 | 0 | 3 | X | X | 12 |

==== Draw 17 ====
Friday, November 13, 2:00 pm

| Sheet A | 1 | 2 | 3 | 4 | 5 | 6 | 7 | 8 | Final |
| Northwest Territories (Delorey) | 0 | 1 | 0 | 2 | 0 | 2 | 0 | X | 5 |
| Newfoundland and Labrador (Eaton) 🔨 | 2 | 0 | 1 | 0 | 4 | 0 | 3 | X | 10 |

| Sheet B | 1 | 2 | 3 | 4 | 5 | 6 | 7 | 8 | Final |
| Nunavut (Mackey) | 2 | 2 | 1 | 0 | 0 | 1 | 0 | 0 | 6 |
| Yukon (Williamson) 🔨 | 0 | 0 | 0 | 2 | 3 | 0 | 1 | 2 | 8 |

| Sheet C | 1 | 2 | 3 | 4 | 5 | 6 | 7 | 8 | Final |
| Prince Edward Island (Arsenault) | 0 | 0 | 2 | 0 | 1 | 0 | 0 | X | 3 |
| Ontario (Heggestad) 🔨 | 1 | 2 | 0 | 1 | 0 | 1 | 2 | X | 7 |

== Championship pool ==
=== Standings ===
Final Championship Pool Standings

Key
| Teams to Playoffs |

| Team | Skip | W | L | W–L |
|---|---|---|---|---|
| Quebec | Félix Asselin | 10 | 0 | – |
| New Brunswick | Sylvie Quillian | 7 | 3 | 1–1 |
| Northern Ontario | Bryan Burgess | 7 | 3 | 1–1 |
| Nova Scotia | Brent MacDougall | 7 | 3 | 1–1 |
| British Columbia | Joshua Miki | 6 | 4 | – |
| Saskatchewan | Tyler Hartung | 5 | 5 | 1–0 |
| Manitoba | Colin Kurz | 5 | 5 | 0–1 |
| Alberta | Andrew Hodgson | 4 | 6 | – |

=== Results ===
==== Draw 13 ====
Thursday, November 12, 12:30 pm

| Sheet A | 1 | 2 | 3 | 4 | 5 | 6 | 7 | 8 | Final |
| Manitoba (Kurz) | 0 | 1 | 0 | 0 | 2 | 0 | X | X | 3 |
| Quebec (Asselin) 🔨 | 2 | 0 | 3 | 1 | 0 | 2 | X | X | 8 |

| Sheet B | 1 | 2 | 3 | 4 | 5 | 6 | 7 | 8 | Final |
| Northern Ontario (Burgess) 🔨 | 0 | 0 | 1 | 1 | 0 | 1 | 0 | 1 | 4 |
| British Columbia (Miki) | 1 | 0 | 0 | 0 | 1 | 0 | 1 | 0 | 3 |

| Sheet C | 1 | 2 | 3 | 4 | 5 | 6 | 7 | 8 | Final |
| Nova Scotia (MacDougall) | 1 | 2 | 0 | 0 | 1 | 0 | 0 | 1 | 5 |
| Alberta (Hodgson) 🔨 | 0 | 0 | 1 | 1 | 0 | 1 | 0 | 0 | 3 |

| Sheet D | 1 | 2 | 3 | 4 | 5 | 6 | 7 | 8 | 9 | Final |
| Saskatchewan (Hartung) | 1 | 0 | 0 | 1 | 0 | 0 | 0 | 1 | 0 | 3 |
| New Brunswick (Quillian) 🔨 | 0 | 1 | 1 | 0 | 1 | 0 | 0 | 0 | 2 | 5 |

==== Draw 15 ====
Thursday, November 12, 7:30 pm

| Sheet A | 1 | 2 | 3 | 4 | 5 | 6 | 7 | 8 | Final |
| Alberta (Hodgson) 🔨 | 0 | 0 | 2 | 1 | 0 | 0 | 2 | 0 | 5 |
| New Brunswick (Quillian) | 0 | 2 | 0 | 0 | 1 | 1 | 0 | 2 | 6 |

| Sheet B | 1 | 2 | 3 | 4 | 5 | 6 | 7 | 8 | Final |
| Nova Scotia (MacDougall) | 1 | 1 | 0 | 1 | 1 | 0 | 1 | 0 | 5 |
| Saskatchewan (Hartung) 🔨 | 0 | 0 | 2 | 0 | 0 | 3 | 0 | 1 | 6 |

| Sheet C | 1 | 2 | 3 | 4 | 5 | 6 | 7 | 8 | Final |
| Quebec (Asselin) | 0 | 2 | 0 | 2 | 0 | 0 | 3 | X | 7 |
| British Columbia (Miki) 🔨 | 1 | 0 | 1 | 0 | 2 | 0 | 0 | X | 4 |

| Sheet D | 1 | 2 | 3 | 4 | 5 | 6 | 7 | 8 | Final |
| Manitoba (Kurz) | 1 | 0 | 2 | 0 | 2 | 1 | 3 | X | 9 |
| Northern Ontario (Burgess) 🔨 | 0 | 2 | 0 | 2 | 0 | 0 | 0 | X | 4 |

==== Draw 16 ====
Friday, November 13, 10:00 am

| Sheet A | 1 | 2 | 3 | 4 | 5 | 6 | 7 | 8 | Final |
| Northern Ontario (Burgess) 🔨 | 2 | 0 | 0 | 1 | 0 | 1 | 0 | 0 | 4 |
| Nova Scotia (MacDougall) | 0 | 2 | 1 | 0 | 0 | 0 | 2 | 1 | 6 |

| Sheet B | 1 | 2 | 3 | 4 | 5 | 6 | 7 | 8 | 9 | Final |
| New Brunswick (Quillian) 🔨 | 2 | 2 | 0 | 0 | 0 | 1 | 0 | 1 | 0 | 6 |
| Quebec (Asselin) | 0 | 0 | 2 | 1 | 1 | 0 | 2 | 0 | 3 | 9 |

| Sheet C | 1 | 2 | 3 | 4 | 5 | 6 | 7 | 8 | Final |
| Saskatchewan (Hartung) 🔨 | 2 | 1 | 0 | 1 | 0 | 0 | 1 | 2 | 7 |
| Manitoba (Kurz) | 0 | 0 | 1 | 0 | 2 | 1 | 0 | 0 | 4 |

| Sheet D | 1 | 2 | 3 | 4 | 5 | 6 | 7 | 8 | Final |
| British Columbia (Miki) | 0 | 1 | 0 | 0 | 1 | 0 | X | X | 2 |
| Alberta (Hodgson) 🔨 | 2 | 0 | 2 | 1 | 0 | 3 | X | X | 8 |

==== Draw 18 ====
Friday, November 13, 6:00 pm

| Sheet A | 1 | 2 | 3 | 4 | 5 | 6 | 7 | 8 | Final |
| British Columbia (Miki) | 0 | 1 | 0 | 2 | 0 | 3 | 0 | 3 | 9 |
| Saskatchewan (Hartung) 🔨 | 2 | 0 | 1 | 0 | 1 | 0 | 3 | 0 | 7 |

| Sheet B | 1 | 2 | 3 | 4 | 5 | 6 | 7 | 8 | Final |
| Alberta (Hodgson) | 0 | 1 | 0 | 0 | 0 | 1 | 1 | X | 3 |
| Manitoba (Kurz) 🔨 | 1 | 0 | 1 | 2 | 1 | 0 | 0 | X | 5 |

| Sheet C | 1 | 2 | 3 | 4 | 5 | 6 | 7 | 8 | Final |
| New Brunswick (Quillian) | 0 | 0 | 0 | 0 | 0 | 0 | X | X | 0 |
| Northern Ontario (Burgess) 🔨 | 0 | 2 | 2 | 3 | 1 | 1 | X | X | 9 |

| Sheet D | 1 | 2 | 3 | 4 | 5 | 6 | 7 | 8 | Final |
| Quebec (Asselin) 🔨 | 0 | 0 | 3 | 1 | 0 | 1 | 0 | 1 | 6 |
| Nova Scotia (MacDougall) | 1 | 1 | 0 | 0 | 1 | 0 | 1 | 0 | 4 |

== Playoffs ==
Semifinals
1 | Quebec | 3
4 | Nova Scotia | 5
2 | New Brunswick | 7
3 | Northern Ontario | 4

Final
4 | Nova Scotia | 9
2 | New Brunswick | 5
Bronze Medal Game
1 | Quebec | 3
3 | Northern Ontario | 4

=== Semifinals ===
Saturday, November 14, 10:00 am

| Sheet B | 1 | 2 | 3 | 4 | 5 | 6 | 7 | 8 | Final |
| Quebec (Asselin) 🔨 | 1 | 0 | 0 | 0 | 1 | 0 | 1 | 0 | 3 |
| Nova Scotia (MacDougall) | 0 | 0 | 2 | 1 | 0 | 1 | 0 | 1 | 5 |

| Sheet C | 1 | 2 | 3 | 4 | 5 | 6 | 7 | 8 | Final |
| New Brunswick (Quillian) 🔨 | 2 | 0 | 1 | 0 | 2 | 0 | 2 | X | 7 |
| Northern Ontario (Burgess) | 0 | 1 | 0 | 1 | 0 | 2 | 0 | X | 4 |

=== Bronze medal game ===
Saturday, November 14, 2:30 pm

| Sheet C | 1 | 2 | 3 | 4 | 5 | 6 | 7 | 8 | Final |
| Quebec (Asselin) 🔨 | 1 | 0 | 1 | 0 | 0 | 0 | 0 | 1 | 3 |
| Northern Ontario (Burgess) | 0 | 1 | 0 | 2 | 0 | 1 | 0 | 0 | 4 |

=== Final ===
Saturday, November 14, 2:30 pm

| Sheet B | 1 | 2 | 3 | 4 | 5 | 6 | 7 | 8 | Final |
| Nova Scotia (MacDougall) 🔨 | 0 | 2 | 0 | 0 | 1 | 1 | 0 | 5 | 9 |
| New Brunswick (Quillian) | 2 | 0 | 0 | 1 | 0 | 0 | 2 | 0 | 5 |

== Final standings ==
| Place | Team |
|---|---|
| 1st place, gold medalist(s) | Nova Scotia |
| 2nd place, silver medalist(s) | New Brunswick |
| 3rd place, bronze medalist(s) | Northern Ontario |
| 4 | Quebec |
| 5 | British Columbia |
| 6 | Saskatchewan |
| 7 | Manitoba |
| 8 | Alberta |

| Place | Team |
|---|---|
| 9 | Newfoundland and Labrador |
| 10 | Ontario |
| 11 | Prince Edward Island |
| 12 | Yukon |
| 13 | Nunavut |
| 14 | Northwest Territories |
