= Heather Graham (disambiguation) =

Heather Graham (born 1970) is an American actress.

Heather Graham may refer to:

- Heather Graham (cricketer) (born 1996), Australian cricketer
- Heather Graham Pozzessere (born 1953), American romance novelist
- Heather Heggestad (previously Heather Graham), Canadian curler
