= 2014 Canadian Mixed Curling Championship =

- Host city: Ottawa, Ontario
- Arena: Rideau Curling Club
- Dates: November 14–23, 2013
- Winner: Alberta
- Curling club: Coaldale CC, Coaldale; Airdrie CC, Airdrie
- Skip: Darren Moulding
- Third: Heather Jensen
- Second: Brent Hamilton
- Lead: Anna-Marie Moulding
- Finalist: Ontario (Cory Heggestad)

The 2014 Canadian Mixed Curling Championship was held from November 14 to 23 at the Rideau Curling Club in Ottawa, Ontario. Alberta's Darren Moulding defeated defending champion Cory Heggestad of Ontario in the final with a score of 8–5.

== Qualifying round ==
Four associations did not automatically qualify to the championships, and will participate in a qualifying round. The Northwest Territories and Yukon were relegated from the championships due to finishing at the bottom of the standings in the previous year's championships. Two qualification spots will be awarded to the two winners of a double knockout round.

=== Teams ===
The teams are listed as follows:

Province	Skip	Third	Second	Lead	Locale
Newfoundland and Labrador	Gary Oke	Susan Curtis	Terry Oke	Sigrid Fitzpatrick	Corner Brook CC, Corner Brook
Northwest Territories	Steve Moss	Ashley Green	Scott Alexander	Debbie Moss	Yellowknife CC, Yellowknife
Nunavut	Ed Sattelberger	Chantelle Masson	Dennis Masson	D'Arcy Masson	Iqaluit CC, Iqaluit
Yukon	Bob Smallwood	Tamar Vandenberghe	Adam Pleasan	Jody Smallwood	Whitehorse CC, Whitehorse

=== Knockout brackets ===
First Knockout			Qualifier 1
1	Northwest Territories	5
4	Newfoundland and Labrador	6	4	Newfoundland and Labrador	7
2	Yukon	6	2	Yukon	5
3	Nunavut	4

Second Knockout			Qualifier 2
1	Northwest Territories	6
3	Nunavut	2	1	Northwest Territories	9
			2	Yukon	4

=== Knockout results ===
All draw times are listed in Eastern Standard Time (UTC–5).

==== First knockout ====
Thursday, November 14, 2:00 pm

Sheet 1	1	2	3	4	5	6	7	8	9	10	Final
Northwest Territories (Moss)	0	1	0	0	2	0	1	1	0	0	5
Newfoundland and Labrador (Oke)	0	0	2	1	0	0	0	0	2	1	6

Sheet 2	1	2	3	4	5	6	7	8	9	10	Final
Yukon (Smallwood)	2	2	3	0	0	0	2	0	0	X	6
Nunavut (Sattelberger)	0	0	0	2	1	1	0	0	0	X	4

Thursday, November 14, 7:00 pm

Sheet 3	1	2	3	4	5	6	7	8	9	10	11	Final
Newfoundland and Labrador (Oke)	0	0	2	0	1	1	0	0	1	0	2	7
Yukon (Smallwood)	2	0	0	1	0	0	0	1	0	1	0	5

==== Second knockout ====
Thursday, November 14, 7:00 pm

Sheet 4	1	2	3	4	5	6	7	8	9	10	Final
Nunavut (Sattelberger)	0	1	0	0	0	0	0	1	0	X	2
Northwest Territories (Moss)	1	0	0	1	0	1	1	0	2	X	6

Friday, November 15, 2:00 pm

Sheet 2	1	2	3	4	5	6	7	8	9	10	Final
Yukon (Smallwood)	0	1	1	0	0	0	0	2	0	X	4
Northwest Territories (Moss)	1	0	0	3	0	1	2	0	2	X	9

== Teams ==
The teams are listed as follows:

Team	Skip	Third	Second	Lead	Locale
Alberta	Darren Moulding	Heather Jensen	Brent Hamilton	Anna-Marie Moulding	Coaldale CC, Coaldale; Airdrie CC, Airdrie
British Columbia	Keith Switzer	Sandra Comadina	Leonard Firkus	Carman Cheng	Vancouver CC, Chilliwack
Manitoba	Sean Grassie	Tracey Lavery	Scott McCamis	Calleen Neufeld	Deer Lodge CC, Winnipeg
New Brunswick	Sylvie Robichaud	Marcel Robichaud	Marie Richard	Lloyd Morrison	Curl Moncton, Moncton
Newfoundland and Labrador	Gary Oke	Susan Curtis	Terry Oke	Sigrid Fitzpatrick	Corner Brook CC, Corner Brook
Northern Ontario	Charlie Robert	Lindsay Miners	Rob Thomas	Alissa Begin	Soo Curlers Association, Sault Ste. Marie
Northwest Territories	Steve Moss	Ashley Green	Scott Alexander	Debbie Moss	Yellowknife CC, Yellowknife
Nova Scotia	Rob Harris	Mary Mattatall	Cameron MacKenzie	Katarina Hakansson	Mayflower CC, Halifax
Ontario	Cory Heggestad	Heather Graham	Greg Balsdon	Amy Balsdon	Orillia CC, Orillia
Prince Edward Island	Rod MacDonald	Kathy O'Rourke	Mark O'Rourke	Karen MacDonald	Silver Fox Curling & Yacht Club, Summerside
Quebec	Mike Fournier	Alanna Routledge	Mike Kennedy	Joëlle St-Hilaire	Club de curling Glenmore, Montreal
Saskatchewan	Shaun Meachem	Kelly Wood	Carl deConnick Smith	Kelsey Dutton	Swift Current CC, Swift Current

== Round-robin standings ==
Final round-robin standings

Key
Teams to Playoffs
Teams to Tiebreaker

Team	Skip	W	L
Alberta	Darren Moulding	9	2
Saskatchewan	Shaun Meachem	9	2
Ontario	Cory Heggestad	8	3
New Brunswick	Sylvie Robichaud	8	3
Quebec	Mike Fournier	7	4
Nova Scotia	Rob Harris	6	5
Prince Edward Island	Rod MacDonald	5	6
Manitoba	Sean Grassie	5	6
Northern Ontario	Charlie Robert	4	7
Northwest Territories	Steve Moss	2	9
British Columbia	Keith Switzer	2	9
Newfoundland and Labrador	Gary Oke	1	10

== Round-robin results ==
All draw times are listed in Eastern Standard Time (UTC–5).

=== Draw 1 ===
Saturday, November 16, 7:30 pm

Sheet A	1	2	3	4	5	6	7	8	9	10	Final
Alberta (Moulding)	0	0	1	0	0	2	1	0	0	1	5
Quebec (Fournier)	0	1	0	1	1	0	0	3	1	0	7

Sheet B	1	2	3	4	5	6	7	8	9	10	Final
Saskatchewan (Meachem)	2	1	0	0	0	0	1	0	2	4	10
Manitoba (Grassie)	0	0	1	1	0	1	0	2	0	0	5

Sheet C	1	2	3	4	5	6	7	8	9	10	Final
British Columbia (Switzer)	0	0	1	0	1	0	3	0	X	X	5
Prince Edward Island (MacDonald)	4	3	0	3	0	2	0	0	X	X	12

Sheet D	1	2	3	4	5	6	7	8	9	10	Final
Ontario (Heggestad)	0	1	0	1	0	0	1	0	0	1	4
New Brunswick (Robichaud)	0	0	1	0	0	0	0	1	0	0	2

=== Draw 2 ===
Sunday, November 17, 10:00 am

Sheet A	1	2	3	4	5	6	7	8	9	10	Final
Northwest Territories (Moss)	0	0	0	1	1	0	1	0	X	X	3
Nova Scotia (Harris)	2	1	1	0	0	2	0	2	X	X	8

Sheet B	1	2	3	4	5	6	7	8	9	10	Final
Prince Edward Island (MacDonald)	0	1	0	0	1	1	0	2	0	X	5
Alberta (Moulding)	2	0	0	2	0	0	1	0	3	X	8

Sheet C	1	2	3	4	5	6	7	8	9	10	Final
Quebec (Fournier)	1	0	0	3	2	0	1	0	1	X	8
British Columbia (Switzer)	0	1	1	0	0	1	0	1	0	X	4

Sheet D	1	2	3	4	5	6	7	8	9	10	Final
Northern Ontario (Robert)	0	2	1	0	1	3	0	2	X	X	9
Newfoundland and Labrador (Oke)	1	0	0	0	0	0	1	0	X	X	2

=== Draw 3 ===
Sunday, November 17, 2:30 pm

Sheet A	1	2	3	4	5	6	7	8	9	10	Final
New Brunswick (Robichaud)	0	0	0	1	0	0	2	0	2	X	5
Northern Ontario (Robert)	0	0	1	0	0	1	0	0	0	X	2

Sheet B	1	2	3	4	5	6	7	8	9	10	Final
Saskatchewan (Meachem)	0	1	1	0	2	0	0	1	1	1	7
Nova Scotia (Harris)	1	0	0	3	0	1	0	0	0	0	5

Sheet C	1	2	3	4	5	6	7	8	9	10	Final
Ontario (Heggestad)	1	0	1	0	0	5	0	0	0	2	9
Newfoundland and Labrador (Oke)	0	0	0	1	1	0	2	1	1	0	6

Sheet D	1	2	3	4	5	6	7	8	9	10	Final
Northwest Territories (Moss)	0	0	1	0	0	1	0	1	0	X	3
Manitoba (Grassie)	2	1	0	1	2	0	1	0	1	X	8

=== Draw 4 ===
Sunday, November 17, 7:00 pm

Sheet A	1	2	3	4	5	6	7	8	9	10	Final
Alberta (Moulding)	0	1	2	0	3	0	3	1	X	X	10
Saskatchewan (Meachem)	0	0	0	3	0	2	0	0	X	X	5

Sheet B	1	2	3	4	5	6	7	8	9	10	Final
Manitoba (Grassie)	0	1	0	0	0	0	0	1	1	X	3
Quebec (Fournier)	0	0	1	2	1	1	0	0	0	X	5

Sheet C	1	2	3	4	5	6	7	8	9	10	Final
Prince Edward Island (MacDonald)	0	1	0	1	0	0	2	0	0	X	4
New Brunswick (Robichaud)	1	0	0	0	1	3	0	0	2	X	7

Sheet D	1	2	3	4	5	6	7	8	9	10	Final
British Columbia (Switzer)	1	0	0	2	0	1	0	2	0	2	8
Ontario (Heggestad)	0	1	1	0	1	0	2	0	1	0	6

=== Draw 5 ===
Monday, November 18, 10:00 am

Sheet B	1	2	3	4	5	6	7	8	9	10	Final
Northwest Territories (Moss)	1	0	0	0	1	0	1	1	1	0	5
Newfoundland and Labrador (Oke)	0	2	1	0	0	2	0	0	0	1	6

Sheet C	1	2	3	4	5	6	7	8	9	10	Final
Northern Ontario (Robert)	0	1	0	0	0	0	5	3	X	X	9
Nova Scotia (Harris)	0	0	1	1	0	0	0	0	X	X	2

=== Draw 6 ===
Monday, November 18, 2:30 pm

Sheet A	1	2	3	4	5	6	7	8	9	10	Final
Quebec (Fournier)	0	0	0	0	2	1	0	0	1	X	4
Ontario (Heggestad)	1	1	1	1	0	0	1	1	0	X	6

Sheet B	1	2	3	4	5	6	7	8	9	10	Final
New Brunswick (Robichaud)	0	0	0	2	0	3	0	1	1	X	7
British Columbia (Switzer)	0	0	1	0	1	0	1	0	0	X	3

Sheet C	1	2	3	4	5	6	7	8	9	10	Final
Manitoba (Grassie)	0	1	0	1	0	1	0	0	1	X	4
Alberta (Moulding)	2	0	1	0	2	0	2	1	0	X	8

Sheet D	1	2	3	4	5	6	7	8	9	10	Final
Prince Edward Island (MacDonald)	1	0	2	0	0	0	0	1	0	X	4
Saskatchewan (Meachem)	0	2	0	0	1	1	2	0	4	X	10

=== Draw 7 ===
Monday, November 18, 7:00 pm

Sheet A	1	2	3	4	5	6	7	8	9	10	Final
Newfoundland and Labrador (Oke)	1	0	1	0	1	0	0	1	0	X	4
British Columbia (Switzer)	0	1	0	1	0	3	2	0	1	X	8

Sheet B	1	2	3	4	5	6	7	8	9	10	Final
Prince Edward Island (MacDonald)	0	1	0	2	2	0	0	1	2	0	8
Northern Ontario (Robert)	2	0	1	0	0	1	4	0	0	1	9

Sheet C	1	2	3	4	5	6	7	8	9	10	Final
Northwest Territories (Moss)	1	0	2	0	0	0	1	0	0	X	4
Quebec (Fournier)	0	1	0	1	1	1	0	3	0	X	7

Sheet D	1	2	3	4	5	6	7	8	9	10	Final
Nova Scotia (Harris)	0	0	0	1	0	0	1	0	X	X	2
Alberta (Moulding)	0	3	3	0	0	3	0	2	X	X	11

=== Draw 8 ===
Tuesday, November 19, 10:00 am

Sheet A	1	2	3	4	5	6	7	8	9	10	Final
Northern Ontario (Robert)	1	1	0	0	0	0	0	0	0	X	2
Quebec (Fournier)	0	0	1	1	3	0	0	1	1	X	7

Sheet B	1	2	3	4	5	6	7	8	9	10	Final
Alberta (Moulding)	1	0	2	0	1	1	1	0	1	X	7
Northwest Territories (Moss)	0	1	0	1	0	0	0	1	0	X	3

Sheet C	1	2	3	4	5	6	7	8	9	10	Final
Nova Scotia (Harris)	0	1	0	1	1	0	2	0	0	1	6
British Columbia (Switzer)	1	0	0	0	0	2	0	0	1	0	4

Sheet D	1	2	3	4	5	6	7	8	9	10	Final
Newfoundland and Labrador (Oke)	1	0	0	1	0	1	0	0	1	0	4
Prince Edward Island (MacDonald)	0	2	0	0	1	0	0	1	0	1	5

=== Draw 9 ===
Tuesday, November 19, 2:30 pm

Sheet A	1	2	3	4	5	6	7	8	9	10	Final
New Brunswick (Robichaud)	2	0	1	2	1	0	1	0	0	X	7
Northwest Territories (Moss)	0	2	0	0	0	1	0	0	1	X	4

Sheet B	1	2	3	4	5	6	7	8	9	10	11	Final
Nova Scotia (Harris)	0	0	0	0	2	0	0	2	0	2	1	7
Ontario (Heggestad)	0	1	0	1	0	1	0	0	3	0	0	6

Sheet C	1	2	3	4	5	6	7	8	9	10	Final
Newfoundland and Labrador (Oke)	0	0	1	0	0	0	1	0	X	X	2
Saskatchewan (Meachem)	1	3	0	1	0	0	0	3	X	X	8

Sheet D	1	2	3	4	5	6	7	8	9	10	Final
Manitoba (Grassie)	0	1	0	3	1	1	2	0	1	X	9
Northern Ontario (Robert)	1	0	2	0	0	0	0	2	0	X	5

=== Draw 10 ===
Tuesday, November 19, 7:00 pm

Sheet A	1	2	3	4	5	6	7	8	9	10	Final
Prince Edward Island (MacDonald)	0	2	0	2	0	4	1	0	1	X	10
Manitoba (Grassie)	1	0	1	0	2	0	0	1	0	X	5

Sheet B	1	2	3	4	5	6	7	8	9	10	Final
British Columbia (Switzer)	2	0	2	0	1	0	0	X	X	X	5
Saskatchewan (Meachem)	0	2	0	2	0	0	6	X	X	X	10

Sheet C	1	2	3	4	5	6	7	8	9	10	Final
Alberta (Moulding)	2	1	0	0	1	0	2	1	0	1	8
Ontario (Heggestad)	0	0	1	1	0	2	0	0	0	0	4

Sheet D	1	2	3	4	5	6	7	8	9	10	Final
New Brunswick (Robichaud)	6	1	0	1	0	1	0	X	X	X	9
Quebec (Fournier)	0	0	2	0	1	0	1	X	X	X	4

=== Draw 11 ===
Wednesday, November 20, 10:00 am

Sheet A	1	2	3	4	5	6	7	8	9	10	Final
Saskatchewan (Meachem)	0	0	0	2	0	0	1	0	X	X	3
Ontario (Heggestad)	1	0	2	0	1	2	0	3	X	X	9

Sheet B	1	2	3	4	5	6	7	8	9	10	Final
Quebec (Fournier)	1	0	1	0	2	0	2	0	0	2	8
Prince Edward Island (MacDonald)	0	1	0	2	0	2	0	1	1	0	7

Sheet C	1	2	3	4	5	6	7	8	9	10	11	Final
New Brunswick (Robichaud)	0	1	1	0	0	1	0	0	1	0	1	5
Manitoba (Grassie)	2	0	0	0	1	0	0	0	0	1	0	4

Sheet D	1	2	3	4	5	6	7	8	9	10	Final
Alberta (Moulding)	1	0	2	4	0	2	0	X	X	X	9
British Columbia (Switzer)	0	1	0	0	1	0	0	X	X	X	2

=== Draw 12 ===
Wednesday, November 20, 2:30 pm

Sheet A	1	2	3	4	5	6	7	8	9	10	Final
Quebec (Fournier)	3	1	0	1	0	2	0	1	1	X	9
Newfoundland and Labrador (Oke)	0	0	1	0	1	0	0	0	0	X	2

Sheet B	1	2	3	4	5	6	7	8	9	10	Final
Northern Ontario (Robert)	0	2	0	2	0	1	0	0	1	0	6
Alberta (Moulding)	0	0	2	0	1	0	2	1	0	2	8

Sheet C	1	2	3	4	5	6	7	8	9	10	Final
British Columbia (Switzer)	1	0	2	0	0	0	1	0	X	X	4
Northwest Territories (Moss)	0	3	0	3	0	3	0	1	X	X	10

Sheet D	1	2	3	4	5	6	7	8	9	10	Final
Prince Edward Island (MacDonald)	0	1	0	0	0	2	0	2	2	X	7
Nova Scotia (Harris)	0	0	1	0	1	0	2	0	0	X	4

=== Draw 13 ===
Wednesday, November 20, 7:00 pm

Sheet A	1	2	3	4	5	6	7	8	9	10	Final
Nova Scotia (Harris)	0	0	3	1	0	3	0	0	1	X	8
New Brunswick (Robichaud)	1	0	0	0	1	0	1	1	0	X	4

Sheet B	1	2	3	4	5	6	7	8	9	10	Final
Newfoundland and Labrador (Oke)	1	0	0	1	0	1	0	0	X	X	3
Manitoba (Grassie)	0	1	3	0	2	0	0	2	X	X	8

Sheet C	1	2	3	4	5	6	7	8	9	10	Final
Ontario (Heggestad)	2	0	4	0	0	2	0	0	3	X	11
Northern Ontario (Robert)	0	2	0	1	1	0	1	2	0	X	7

Sheet D	1	2	3	4	5	6	7	8	9	10	Final
Saskatchewan (Meachem)	0	0	3	0	1	1	1	1	0	1	8
Northwest Territories (Moss)	1	2	0	1	0	0	0	0	2	0	6

=== Draw 14 ===
Thursday, November 21, 10:00 am

Sheet A	1	2	3	4	5	6	7	8	9	10	Final
Northwest Territories (Moss)	2	0	2	0	2	0	1	0	0	X	7
Northern Ontario (Robert)	0	0	0	1	0	2	0	1	1	X	5

Sheet B	1	2	3	4	5	6	7	8	9	10	Final
Saskatchewan (Meachem)	1	0	0	0	2	0	1	0	0	1	5
New Brunswick (Robichaud)	0	0	1	0	0	1	0	0	1	0	3

Sheet C	1	2	3	4	5	6	7	8	9	10	Final
Nova Scotia (Harris)	1	0	2	1	3	0	0	1	X	X	8
Newfoundland and Labrador (Oke)	0	1	0	0	0	0	1	0	X	X	2

Sheet D	1	2	3	4	5	6	7	8	9	10	Final
Ontario (Heggestad)	1	2	2	0	1	0	4	X	X	X	10
Manitoba (Grassie)	0	0	0	1	0	1	0	X	X	X	2

=== Draw 15 ===
Thursday, November 21, 2:30 pm

Sheet A	1	2	3	4	5	6	7	8	9	10	11	Final
Ontario (Heggestad)	0	2	0	0	1	0	1	1	1	0	1	7
Prince Edward Island (MacDonald)	1	0	2	0	0	1	0	0	0	2	0	6

Sheet B	1	2	3	4	5	6	7	8	9	10	Final
Manitoba (Grassie)	2	0	0	2	1	1	0	4	X	X	10
British Columbia (Switzer)	0	0	1	0	0	0	2	0	X	X	3

Sheet C	1	2	3	4	5	6	7	8	9	10	Final
Alberta (Moulding)	1	0	0	1	0	1	0	1	0	X	4
New Brunswick (Robichaud)	0	3	0	0	3	0	1	0	2	X	9

Sheet D	1	2	3	4	5	6	7	8	9	10	Final
Quebec (Fournier)	0	1	0	2	0	0	2	0	0	X	5
Saskatchewan (Meachem)	0	0	1	0	3	1	0	1	1	X	7

=== Draw 16 ===
Thursday, November 21, 7:00 pm

Sheet A	1	2	3	4	5	6	7	8	9	10	Final
Newfoundland and Labrador (Oke)	2	1	0	0	1	0	0	1	0	0	5
Alberta (Moulding)	0	0	3	2	0	1	0	0	0	2	8

Sheet B	1	2	3	4	5	6	7	8	9	10	Final
Quebec (Fournier)	0	1	0	1	0	1	1	0	1	1	6
Nova Scotia (Harris)	2	0	1	0	2	0	0	2	0	0	7

Sheet C	1	2	3	4	5	6	7	8	9	10	Final
Northwest Territories (Moss)	0	0	1	2	0	0	2	0	0	X	5
Prince Edward Island (MacDonald)	1	2	0	0	2	1	0	1	2	X	9

Sheet D	1	2	3	4	5	6	7	8	9	10	Final
British Columbia (Switzer)	0	0	0	1	0	0	1	1	0	2	5
Northern Ontario (Robert)	0	1	2	0	0	2	0	0	2	0	7

=== Draw 17 ===
Friday, November 22, 10:00 am

Sheet A	1	2	3	4	5	6	7	8	9	10	Final
Manitoba (Grassie)	2	4	0	0	0	3	0	2	X	X	11
Nova Scotia (Harris)	0	0	1	1	2	0	1	0	X	X	5

Sheet B	1	2	3	4	5	6	7	8	9	10	Final
Ontario (Heggestad)	0	0	1	1	0	3	0	0	1	1	7
Northwest Territories (Moss)	0	0	0	0	1	0	2	1	0	0	4

Sheet C	1	2	3	4	5	6	7	8	9	10	Final
Northern Ontario (Robert)	0	1	0	1	0	0	0	0	X	X	2
Saskatchewan (Meachem)	0	0	2	0	2	1	2	2	X	X	9

Sheet D	1	2	3	4	5	6	7	8	9	10	Final
Newfoundland and Labrador (Oke)	0	1	0	0	1	0	0	1	X	X	3
New Brunswick (Robichaud)	1	0	2	1	0	2	1	0	X	X	7

== Tiebreaker ==
Friday, November 22, 2:30 pm

Sheet B	1	2	3	4	5	6	7	8	9	10	Final
New Brunswick (Robichaud)	1	2	0	0	1	0	2	0	2	0	8
Ontario (Heggestad)	0	0	2	1	0	3	0	2	0	1	9

Player percentages
New Brunswick		Ontario	
Lloyd Morrison	89%	Amy Balsdon	73%
Marie Richard	86%	Greg Balsdon	75%
Marcel Robichaud	80%	Heather Graham	84%
Sylvie Robichaud	73%	Cory Heggestad	83%
Total	82%	Total	78%

== Playoffs ==
Semifinal			Final
			1	Alberta	8
2	Saskatchewan	5	3	Ontario	5
3	Ontario	6

=== Semifinal ===
Friday, November 22, 7:30 pm

Team	1	2	3	4	5	6	7	8	9	10	Final
Saskatchewan (Meachem)	0	1	0	2	0	0	0	1	0	1	5
Ontario (Heggestad)	0	0	1	0	1	0	1	0	3	0	6

Player percentages
Saskatchewan		Ontario	
Kelsey Dutton	75%	Amy Balsdon	91%
Carl deConnick Smith	81%	Greg Balsdon	88%
Kelly Wood	78%	Heather Graham	84%
Shaun Meachem	80%	Cory Heggestad	75%
Total	78%	Total	84%

=== Final ===
Saturday, November 23, 2:00 pm

Team	1	2	3	4	5	6	7	8	9	10	Final
Alberta (Moulding)	0	2	1	0	0	1	0	2	2	X	8
Ontario (Heggestad)	1	0	0	1	1	0	2	0	0	X	5

Player percentages
Alberta		Ontario	
Anna-Marie Moulding	85%	Amy Balsdon	88%
Brent Hamilton	89%	Greg Balsdon	75%
Heather Jensen	76%	Heather Graham	74%
Darren Moulding	78%	Cory Heggestad	75%
Total	80%	Total	78%

2014 Canadian Mixed Curling Championship
(Alberta)
Alberta
10th title
