= 2026 Stu Sells 1824 Halifax Classic =

- Host city: Halifax, Nova Scotia
- Arena: Halifax Curling Club
- Dates: November 11–15
- Men's winner: (Switzerland) Team Hösli
- Curling club: CC Glarus, Glarus
- Skip: Marco Hösli
- Fourth: Philipp Hösli
- Second: Simon Gloor
- Lead: Justin Hausherr
- Finalist: (Switzerland) Yannick Schwaller
- Women's winner: (Switzerland) Team Pätz
- Curling club: CC Genève, Geneva
- Skip: Alina Pätz
- Third: Selina Witschonke
- Second: Stefanie Berset
- Lead: Renée Frigo
- Finalist: (Japan) Ikue Kitazawa

The 2026 Stu Sells 1824 Halifax Classic was held from November 11 to 15 at the Halifax Curling Club in Halifax, Nova Scotia. The total purse for the event was $25,500 on both the men's and women's sides.

For the 2026–27 season, the event was a satellite Grand Slam of Curling event. The highest ranking non-qualified team on the men's and women's sides earned a spot at the 2026 GSOC National, the third Grand Slam of the season. On the men's side, as both teams in the final had already qualified, Takumi Maeda from Japan earned the spot as the highest-ranked semifinal team. In the women's event, as the winners Team Pätz had already qualified, Japan's Ikue Kitazawa who finished in second qualified for the National.

== Men ==
=== Teams ===
The teams are listed as follows:

Skip	Third	Second	Lead	Alternate	Locale
Julien Tremblay	Jesse Mullen	Scott Saccary (Note: With Félix Asselin skipping Team Quebec at the 2026 Canadian Mixed Curling Championship, Scott Saccary joined Team Asselin as second, with Jesse Mullen moving to third and Julien Tremblay as skip.)	Jean-Michel Arsenault		Laval, Quebec
Jason Camm	Sam Wills	Wyatt Small	Nathan Steele		Navan, Ontario
James Grattan	Jonathan Beuk	Andy McCann	Noah Riggs		Oromocto, New Brunswick
Caden Hebert	Jackson Bestland	Benji Paral	Daniel Laufer (Note: Daniel Laufer spared for Jack Wendtland who missed the tournament.)		(United States) Eau Claire, Wisconsin
Philipp Hösli (Fourth)	Marco Hösli (Skip)	Simon Gloor	Justin Hausherr		Glarus, Switzerland
Mark Kean	Luke Saunders	Nathan Gray	Ryan Abraham		Halifax, Nova Scotia
Joel Krats	Ryan McNeil Lamswood	Daniel Bruce	Aaron Feltham		St. John's, Newfoundland and Labrador
Calan MacIsaac (Fourth)	Nick Mosher (Skip) (Note: Nick Mosher skipped Team MacIsaac.)	Owain Fisher	Christopher McCurdy		Truro, Nova Scotia
Takumi Maeda	Hiroki Maeda	Uryu Kamikawa	Gakuto Tokoro	Ryotaro Shukuya	Tokoro, Japan
Sam Mooibroek	Owen Purcell	Scott Mitchell	Alan Fawcett (Note: Alan Fawcett spared for Gavin Lydiate who mised the tournament.)		Whitby, Ontario
Benoît Schwarz-van Berkel (Fourth)	Yannick Schwaller (Skip)	Sven Michel	Pablo Lachat-Couchepin		Geneva, Switzerland
Kendal Thompson	Stuart Thompson	Bryce Everist	Michael Brophy		Halifax, Nova Scotia
Kyle Waddell	Mark Watt	Duncan McFadzean (Note: Duncan McFadzean spared for Angus Bryce who was recovering from an injury.)	Blair Haswell		Hamilton, Scotland
Riku Yanagisawa (Fourth)	Tsuyoshi Yamaguchi (Skip)	Takeru Yamamoto	Satoshi Koizumi		Karuizawa, Japan
Mattia Giovanella (Fourth)	Alberto Zisa (Skip)	Francesco De Zanna	Francesco Vigliani		Trentino, Italy

=== Round robin standings ===
Final Round Robin Standings

Key
Teams to Playoffs

Pool A	W	L	PF	PA	DSC
(Switzerland) Yannick Schwaller	4	0	26	17	2.8
(New Brunswick) James Grattan	3	1	21	18	24.0
(Ontario) Sam Mooibroek	2	2	23	20	73.2
(Nova Scotia) Team MacIsaac	1	3	20	23	64.2
(United States) Caden Hebert	0	4	14	26	184.9

Pool B	W	L	PF	PA	DSC
(Switzerland) Marco Hösli	4	0	24	9	65.1
(Japan) Takumi Maeda	3	1	26	16	25.3
(Nova Scotia) Kendal Thompson	2	2	21	19	190.3
(Italy) Alberto Zisa	1	3	17	25	66.0
(Ontario) Jason Camm	0	4	13	32	76.1

Pool C	W	L	PF	PA	DSC
(Scotland) Kyle Waddell	3	1	21	10	27.2
(Japan) Tsuyoshi Yamaguchi	3	1	19	18	188.7
(Quebec) Team Asselin	2	2	21	17	10.5
(Newfoundland and Labrador) Joel Krats	1	3	20	25	162.6
(Nova Scotia) Mark Kean	1	3	11	22	240.2

=== Round robin results ===
All draw times are listed in Atlantic Time (UTC−04:00).
Note: Sheets are ordered 1, 8, 2, 4.

==== Draw 1 ====
Wednesday, November 11, 9:00 am

Sheet 1	1	2	3	4	5	6	7	8	Final
(Nova Scotia) Mark Kean	0	0	0	0	0	1	0	X	1
(Japan) Tsuyoshi Yamaguchi 🔨	0	2	0	0	1	0	3	X	6

Sheet 2	1	2	3	4	5	6	7	8	Final
(Nova Scotia) Kendal Thompson	0	2	1	2	0	0	1	0	6
(Italy) Alberto Zisa 🔨	1	0	0	0	1	1	0	1	4

==== Draw 2 ====
Wednesday, November 11, 12:45 pm

Sheet 1	1	2	3	4	5	6	7	8	9	Final
(Ontario) Sam Mooibroek	0	2	0	2	0	0	0	1	0	5
(New Brunswick) James Grattan 🔨	1	0	1	0	0	2	1	0	1	6

Sheet 2	1	2	3	4	5	6	7	8	9	Final
(Scotland) Kyle Waddell	0	1	0	0	1	1	1	0	1	5
(Quebec) Team Asselin 🔨	0	0	2	1	0	0	0	1	0	4

==== Draw 3 ====
Wednesday, November 11, 4:30 pm

Sheet 1	1	2	3	4	5	6	7	8	Final
(United States) Caden Hebert 🔨	1	0	0	1	0	0	2	0	4
(Nova Scotia) Team MacIsaac	0	0	3	0	1	1	0	2	7

Sheet 4	1	2	3	4	5	6	7	8	Final
(Nova Scotia) Kendal Thompson 🔨	2	0	1	0	0	1	0	0	4
(Japan) Takumi Maeda	0	1	0	2	1	0	2	1	7

==== Draw 4 ====
Wednesday, November 11, 8:15 pm

Sheet 2	1	2	3	4	5	6	7	8	Final
(Nova Scotia) Mark Kean	1	0	0	2	0	0	2	2	7
(Newfoundland and Labrador) Joel Krats 🔨	0	3	0	0	0	1	0	0	4

Sheet 4	1	2	3	4	5	6	7	8	Final
(Switzerland) Marco Hösli 🔨	2	0	1	0	3	0	1	X	7
(Ontario) Jason Camm	0	0	0	2	0	1	0	X	3

==== Draw 5 ====
Thursday, November 12, 9:00 am

Sheet 2	1	2	3	4	5	6	7	8	Final
(United States) Caden Hebert	0	0	1	0	2	0	0	X	3
(Ontario) Sam Mooibroek 🔨	0	5	0	1	0	1	0	X	7

Sheet 4	1	2	3	4	5	6	7	8	Final
(Scotland) Kyle Waddell 🔨	0	1	0	0	0	1	1	X	3
(Japan) Tsuyoshi Yamaguchi	1	0	2	1	0	0	0	X	4

==== Draw 6 ====
Thursday, November 12, 12:45 pm

Sheet 8	1	2	3	4	5	6	7	8	Final
(Switzerland) Marco Hösli 🔨	2	1	0	2	0	2	X	X	7
(Italy) Alberto Zisa	0	0	1	0	1	0	X	X	2

Sheet 2	1	2	3	4	5	6	7	8	Final
(Japan) Takumi Maeda	0	1	0	2	2	0	3	X	8
(Ontario) Jason Camm 🔨	2	0	1	0	0	1	0	X	4

Sheet 4	1	2	3	4	5	6	7	8	Final
(Quebec) Team Asselin	0	2	0	1	0	1	0	X	4
(Newfoundland and Labrador) Joel Krats 🔨	1	0	3	0	2	0	2	X	8

==== Draw 7 ====
Thursday, November 12, 4:30 pm

Sheet 2	1	2	3	4	5	6	7	8	Final
(Switzerland) Yannick Schwaller	1	0	2	1	0	2	X	X	6
(New Brunswick) James Grattan 🔨	0	1	0	0	1	0	X	X	2

==== Draw 8 ====
Thursday, November 12, 8:15 pm

Sheet 1	1	2	3	4	5	6	7	8	Final
(Ontario) Sam Mooibroek	1	0	1	0	1	0	2	0	5
(Nova Scotia) Team MacIsaac 🔨	0	1	0	1	0	1	0	1	4

Sheet 2	1	2	3	4	5	6	7	8	Final
(Nova Scotia) Mark Kean	1	0	0	0	1	0	1	0	3
(Quebec) Team Asselin 🔨	0	1	0	1	0	2	0	1	5

==== Draw 9 ====
Friday, November 13, 9:00 am

Sheet 8	1	2	3	4	5	6	7	8	Final
(Nova Scotia) Kendal Thompson 🔨	3	1	2	0	0	0	3	X	9
(Ontario) Jason Camm	0	0	0	1	1	1	0	X	3

Sheet 4	1	2	3	4	5	6	7	8	Final
(United States) Caden Hebert	0	1	0	2	0	0	1	X	4
(New Brunswick) James Grattan 🔨	2	0	2	0	2	1	0	X	7

==== Draw 10 ====
Friday, November 13, 12:45 pm

Sheet 1	1	2	3	4	5	6	7	8	Final
(Scotland) Kyle Waddell 🔨	0	2	3	0	0	1	X	X	6
(Newfoundland and Labrador) Joel Krats	0	0	0	2	0	0	X	X	2

Sheet 8	1	2	3	4	5	6	7	8	9	Final
(Switzerland) Yannick Schwaller 🔨	0	1	1	0	1	0	2	1	2	8
(Nova Scotia) Team MacIsaac	2	0	0	2	0	2	0	0	0	6

==== Draw 11 ====
Friday, November 13, 4:30 pm

Sheet 2	1	2	3	4	5	6	7	8	Final
(Italy) Alberto Zisa 🔨	2	0	1	1	0	3	1	X	8
(Ontario) Jason Camm	0	1	0	0	2	0	0	X	3

Sheet 4	1	2	3	4	5	6	7	8	Final
(Switzerland) Marco Hösli 🔨	0	0	3	0	1	1	0	X	5
(Japan) Takumi Maeda	1	0	0	1	0	0	0	X	2

==== Draw 12 ====
Friday, November 13, 8:15 pm

Sheet 8	1	2	3	4	5	6	7	8	Final
(Quebec) Team Asselin 🔨	0	2	2	2	0	2	X	X	8
(Japan) Tsuyoshi Yamaguchi	0	0	0	0	1	0	X	X	1

Sheet 4	1	2	3	4	5	6	7	8	9	Final
(Switzerland) Yannick Schwaller 🔨	2	1	0	0	0	2	1	0	1	7
(Ontario) Sam Mooibroek	0	0	1	0	2	0	0	3	0	6

==== Draw 13 ====
Saturday, November 14, 9:00 am

Sheet 8	1	2	3	4	5	6	7	8	Final
(Nova Scotia) Mark Kean 🔨	0	0	0	0	X	X	X	X	0
(Scotland) Kyle Waddell	2	2	0	3	X	X	X	X	7

Sheet 2	1	2	3	4	5	6	7	8	Final
(New Brunswick) James Grattan	1	2	0	1	0	1	0	1	6
(Nova Scotia) Team MacIsaac 🔨	0	0	2	0	1	0	0	0	3

==== Draw 14 ====
Saturday, November 14, 12:45 pm

Sheet 1	1	2	3	4	5	6	7	8	Final
(Japan) Takumi Maeda 🔨	3	1	0	1	0	4	X	X	9
(Italy) Alberto Zisa	0	0	1	0	2	0	X	X	3

Sheet 4	1	2	3	4	5	6	7	8	Final
(Japan) Tsuyoshi Yamaguchi 🔨	0	3	0	1	0	2	2	X	8
(Newfoundland and Labrador) Joel Krats	2	0	3	0	1	0	0	X	6

==== Draw 15 ====
Saturday, November 14, 4:30 pm

Sheet 1	1	2	3	4	5	6	7	8	Final
(Switzerland) Marco Hösli 🔨	0	1	1	0	3	0	X	X	5
(Nova Scotia) Kendal Thompson	0	0	0	1	0	1	X	X	2

Sheet 2	1	2	3	4	5	6	7	8	Final
(United States) Caden Hebert 🔨	0	1	0	1	0	0	1	X	3
(Switzerland) Yannick Schwaller	0	0	3	0	1	1	0	X	5

=== Playoffs ===
Quarterfinals
4	(Japan) Takumi Maeda	9
5	(Scotland) Kyle Waddell	2
3	(New Brunswick) James Grattan	6
6	(Japan) Tsuyoshi Yamaguchi	5

Semifinals
1	(Switzerland) Yannick Schwaller	8
5	(Japan) Takumi Maeda	3
2	(Switzerland) Marco Hösli	7
3	(New Brunswick) James Grattan	6

Final
1	(Switzerland) Yannick Schwaller	2
2	(Switzerland) Marco Hösli	7

==== Quarterfinals ====
Saturday, November 14, 8:15 pm

Sheet 8	1	2	3	4	5	6	7	8	Final
(New Brunswick) James Grattan	0	1	0	1	0	0	0	4	6
(Japan) Tsuyoshi Yamaguchi 🔨	1	0	2	0	1	1	0	0	5

Sheet 4	1	2	3	4	5	6	7	8	Final
(Japan) Takumi Maeda	1	1	0	0	4	3	X	X	9
(Scotland) Kyle Waddell 🔨	0	0	1	1	0	0	X	X	2

==== Semifinals ====
Sunday, November 15, 10:00 am

Sheet 1	1	2	3	4	5	6	7	8	Final
(Switzerland) Yannick Schwaller 🔨	1	0	5	0	1	1	X	X	8
(Japan) Takumi Maeda	0	1	0	2	0	0	X	X	3

Sheet 2	1	2	3	4	5	6	7	8	Final
(Switzerland) Marco Hösli 🔨	4	0	0	1	0	2	0	0	7
(New Brunswick) James Grattan	0	2	1	0	1	0	1	1	6

==== Final ====
Sunday, November 15, 2:00 pm

Sheet 8	1	2	3	4	5	6	7	8	Final
(Switzerland) Yannick Schwaller 🔨	1	0	0	0	0	1	0	X	2
(Switzerland) Marco Hösli	0	0	2	1	1	0	3	X	7

== Women ==
=== Teams ===
The teams are listed as follows:

Skip	Third	Second	Lead	Alternate	Locale
Christina Black	Jill Brothers	Marlee Powers	Lindsey Burgess	Karlee Everist	Halifax, Nova Scotia
Hollie Duncan (Fourth)	Megan Balsdon (Skip) (Note: Megan Balsdon skipped Team Duncan.)	Rachelle Strybosch	Tess Guyatt		Woodstock, Ontario
Mélodie Forsythe	Rebecca Watson	Jaclyn Crandall (Note: Alternate Jaclyn Crandall spared for Carly Smith.)	Jenna Campbell		Fredericton, New Brunswick
Satsuki Fujisawa	Yako Matsuzawa	Yumi Suzuki	Yurika Yoshida		Kitami, Japan
Ha Seung-youn	Kim Hye-rin	Kim Cho-hi	Kim Seon-yeong		Gangneung, South Korea
Fay Henderson	Lisa Davie	Laura Watt	Katie McMillan	Sophie Sinclair	Stirling, Scotland
Kim Kyeong-ae (Note: Kim Kyeong-ae skipped Team Kang as Kang Bo-bae was training with the mixed doubles national team. Kim Min-seo moved from alternate to third.)	Kim Min-seo	Shim Yu-jeong	Kim Ji-soo		Jeonbuk, South Korea
Andrea Kelly	Jennifer Fenwick	Allyson MacNutt (Note: With Erin Carmody competing for Team Nova Scotia at the 2026 Canadian Mixed Curling Championship, Allyson MacNutt spared for Team Kelly at second.)	Katie Vandenborre		Fredericton, New Brunswick
Ikue Kitazawa	Seina Nakajima	Minori Suzuki	Hasumi Ishigooka		Nagano, Japan
Mina Kobayashi	Kaho Onodera	Yuna Kotani	Anna Ohmiya		Sapporo, Japan
Kayla MacMillan (Fourth)	Val Sweeting (Skip) (Note: Val Sweeting skipped Team MacMillan.)	Lindsay Dubue	Lauren Lenentine		Victoria, British Columbia
Miku Nihira	Momoha Tabata	Sae Yamamoto	Mikoto Nakajima		Sapporo, Japan
Alina Pätz	Selina Witschonke	Stefanie Berset	Renée Frigo		Geneva, Switzerland
Park Seo-jin (Fourth)	Park You-been (Skip)	Yang Tae-i	Kim Su-jin		Chuncheon, South Korea
Taylour Stevens	Maria Fitzgerald	Rebecca Regan	Cate Fitzgerald		Halifax, Nova Scotia

=== Round robin standings ===
Final Round Robin Standings

Key
Teams to Playoffs

Pool A	W	L	PF	PA	DSC
(Japan) Ikue Kitazawa	4	0	24	10	31.9
(Switzerland) Alina Pätz	2	2	21	14	87.2
(Nova Scotia) Taylour Stevens	2	2	18	17	103.0
(Ontario) Team Duncan	1	3	14	20	66.2
(Japan) Mina Kobayashi	1	3	10	26	82.5

Pool B	W	L	PF	PA	DSC
(Japan) Miku Nihira	3	1	31	16	35.9
(Scotland) Fay Henderson	3	1	23	22	109.1
(South Korea) Ha Seung-youn	2	2	16	17	221.9
(Japan) Satsuki Fujisawa	2	2	24	24	262.4
(New Brunswick) Mélodie Forsythe	0	4	13	28	411.0

Pool C	W	L	PF	PA	DSC
(British Columbia) Team MacMillan	3	1	24	17	154.1
(South Korea) Park You-been	3	1	24	19	350.4
(New Brunswick) Andrea Kelly	2	2	21	25	152.3
(Nova Scotia) Christina Black	1	3	24	25	88.0
(South Korea) Kim Kyeong-ae	1	3	16	23	148.9

=== Round robin results ===
All draw times are listed in Atlantic Time (UTC−04:00).
Note: Sheets are ordered 1, 8, 2, 4.

==== Draw 1 ====
Wednesday, November 11, 9:00 am

Sheet 8	1	2	3	4	5	6	7	8	9	Final
(Switzerland) Alina Pätz	0	0	1	0	1	0	1	1	0	4
(Japan) Ikue Kitazawa 🔨	0	0	0	2	0	2	0	0	1	5

Sheet 4	1	2	3	4	5	6	7	8	Final
(South Korea) Park You-been	3	1	0	3	0	1	0	X	8
(Nova Scotia) Christina Black 🔨	0	0	2	0	2	0	2	X	6

==== Draw 2 ====
Wednesday, November 11, 12:45 pm

Sheet 8	1	2	3	4	5	6	7	8	Final
(Japan) Miku Nihira 🔨	0	2	2	0	0	3	1	X	8
(South Korea) Ha Seung-youn	0	0	0	1	1	0	0	X	2

Sheet 4	1	2	3	4	5	6	7	8	Final
(Japan) Satsuki Fujisawa 🔨	2	1	0	2	0	2	0	0	7
(New Brunswick) Mélodie Forsythe	0	0	2	0	2	0	1	1	6

==== Draw 3 ====
Wednesday, November 11, 4:30 pm

Sheet 8	1	2	3	4	5	6	7	8	Final
(Ontario) Team Duncan	0	0	1	0	1	1	0	X	3
(Nova Scotia) Taylour Stevens 🔨	1	2	0	1	0	0	2	X	6

Sheet 2	1	2	3	4	5	6	7	8	Final
(British Columbia) Team MacMillan 🔨	0	2	0	1	0	3	0	1	7
(New Brunswick) Andrea Kelly	0	0	1	0	2	0	3	0	6

==== Draw 4 ====
Wednesday, November 11, 8:15 pm

Sheet 1	1	2	3	4	5	6	7	8	Final
(Japan) Miku Nihira 🔨	0	3	0	3	0	4	X	X	10
(Scotland) Fay Henderson	0	0	1	0	1	0	X	X	2

Sheet 8	1	2	3	4	5	6	7	8	9	Final
(South Korea) Kim Kyeong-ae	1	0	0	2	0	1	1	0	1	6
(Nova Scotia) Christina Black 🔨	0	1	0	0	2	0	0	2	0	5

==== Draw 5 ====
Thursday, November 12, 9:00 am

Sheet 1	1	2	3	4	5	6	7	8	Final
(Nova Scotia) Taylour Stevens 🔨	2	0	4	1	0	X	X	X	7
(Japan) Mina Kobayashi	0	0	0	0	1	X	X	X	1

Sheet 8	1	2	3	4	5	6	7	8	Final
(South Korea) Park You-been	0	0	1	1	0	0	2	0	4
(New Brunswick) Andrea Kelly 🔨	2	0	0	0	1	1	0	1	5

==== Draw 6 ====
Thursday, November 12, 12:45 pm

Sheet 1	1	2	3	4	5	6	7	8	Final
(Ontario) Team Duncan	0	0	0	1	0	0	X	X	1
(Japan) Ikue Kitazawa 🔨	1	1	2	0	2	1	X	X	7

==== Draw 7 ====
Thursday, November 12, 4:30 pm

Sheet 1	1	2	3	4	5	6	7	8	Final
(South Korea) Ha Seung-youn 🔨	0	0	0	2	0	2	1	X	5
(New Brunswick) Mélodie Forsythe	0	1	0	0	1	0	0	X	2

Sheet 8	1	2	3	4	5	6	7	8	Final
(Nova Scotia) Christina Black 🔨	0	1	0	0	1	0	3	0	5
(British Columbia) Team MacMillan	0	0	2	0	0	3	0	3	8

Sheet 4	1	2	3	4	5	6	7	8	Final
(Switzerland) Alina Pätz	0	1	0	1	0	1	1	0	4
(Japan) Mina Kobayashi 🔨	2	0	2	0	1	0	0	1	6

==== Draw 8 ====
Thursday, November 12, 8:15 pm

Sheet 8	1	2	3	4	5	6	7	8	9	Final
(Japan) Satsuki Fujisawa 🔨	1	0	2	0	1	0	0	2	0	6
(Scotland) Fay Henderson	0	1	0	2	0	2	1	0	1	7

Sheet 4	1	2	3	4	5	6	7	8	Final
(South Korea) Kim Kyeong-ae	0	1	0	1	1	0	2	0	5
(New Brunswick) Andrea Kelly 🔨	2	0	1	0	0	2	0	1	6

==== Draw 9 ====
Friday, November 13, 9:00 am

Sheet 1	1	2	3	4	5	6	7	8	Final
(Japan) Ikue Kitazawa 🔨	1	2	1	0	0	0	1	0	5
(Nova Scotia) Taylour Stevens	0	0	0	1	1	1	0	1	4

Sheet 2	1	2	3	4	5	6	7	8	Final
(Japan) Miku Nihira 🔨	2	0	5	0	0	1	X	X	8
(New Brunswick) Mélodie Forsythe	0	1	0	1	0	0	X	X	2

==== Draw 10 ====
Friday, November 13, 12:45 pm

Sheet 2	1	2	3	4	5	6	7	8	Final
(Ontario) Team Duncan 🔨	4	0	0	1	3	X	X	X	8
(Japan) Mina Kobayashi	0	1	1	0	0	X	X	X	2

Sheet 4	1	2	3	4	5	6	7	8	Final
(South Korea) Park You-been 🔨	0	0	0	1	2	0	1	1	5
(British Columbia) Team MacMillan	0	1	1	0	0	1	0	0	3

==== Draw 11 ====
Friday, November 13, 4:30 pm

Sheet 1	1	2	3	4	5	6	7	8	Final
(Scotland) Fay Henderson 🔨	1	3	0	1	1	0	2	X	8
(New Brunswick) Mélodie Forsythe	0	0	1	0	0	2	0	X	3

Sheet 8	1	2	3	4	5	6	7	8	Final
(Japan) Satsuki Fujisawa	0	0	1	0	0	0	X	X	1
(South Korea) Ha Seung-youn 🔨	2	1	0	1	1	1	X	X	6

==== Draw 12 ====
Friday, November 13, 8:15 pm

Sheet 1	1	2	3	4	5	6	7	8	Final
(South Korea) Kim Kyeong-ae	0	0	0	0	0	1	X	X	1
(British Columbia) Team MacMillan 🔨	0	1	2	1	2	0	X	X	6

Sheet 2	1	2	3	4	5	6	7	8	Final
(Switzerland) Alina Pätz 🔨	2	0	3	2	1	X	X	X	8
(Nova Scotia) Taylour Stevens	0	1	0	0	0	X	X	X	1

==== Draw 13 ====
Saturday, November 14, 9:00 am

Sheet 1	1	2	3	4	5	6	7	8	Final
(Nova Scotia) Christina Black 🔨	2	0	1	0	2	1	2	X	8
(New Brunswick) Andrea Kelly	0	1	0	2	0	0	0	X	3

Sheet 4	1	2	3	4	5	6	7	8	Final
(Japan) Miku Nihira 🔨	0	1	0	2	2	0	X	X	5
(Japan) Satsuki Fujisawa	1	0	3	0	0	6	X	X	10

==== Draw 14 ====
Saturday, November 14, 12:45 pm

Sheet 8	1	2	3	4	5	6	7	8	Final
(Switzerland) Alina Pätz 🔨	2	0	1	0	0	2	0	X	5
(Ontario) Team Duncan	0	1	0	1	0	0	0	X	2

Sheet 2	1	2	3	4	5	6	7	8	Final
(South Korea) Park You-been	0	1	2	0	0	1	1	1	6
(South Korea) Kim Kyeong-ae 🔨	2	0	0	1	1	0	0	0	4

==== Draw 15 ====
Saturday, November 14, 4:30 pm

Sheet 8	1	2	3	4	5	6	7	8	Final
(Japan) Ikue Kitazawa 🔨	3	1	0	1	2	X	X	X	7
(Japan) Mina Kobayashi	0	0	1	0	0	X	X	X	1

Sheet 4	1	2	3	4	5	6	7	8	Final
(South Korea) Ha Seung-youn	0	0	1	1	0	0	1	X	3
(Scotland) Fay Henderson 🔨	2	2	0	0	1	1	0	X	6

=== Playoffs ===
Quarterfinals
4	(British Columbia) Team MacMillan	7
5	(South Korea) Park You-been	4
3	(Scotland) Fay Henderson	3
6	(Switzerland) Alina Pätz	5

Semifinals
1	(Japan) Ikue Kitazawa	6
5	(British Columbia) Team MacMillan	2
2	(Japan) Miku Nihira	5
6	(Switzerland) Alina Pätz	7

Final
1	(Japan) Ikue Kitazawa	4
6	(Switzerland) Alina Pätz	5

==== Quarterfinals ====
Saturday, November 14, 8:15 pm

Sheet 1	1	2	3	4	5	6	7	8	Final
(British Columbia) Team MacMillan	1	0	2	1	2	0	0	1	7
(South Korea) Park You-been 🔨	0	2	0	0	0	0	2	0	4

Sheet 2	1	2	3	4	5	6	7	8	Final
(Scotland) Fay Henderson 🔨	1	1	0	1	0	0	0	X	3
(Switzerland) Alina Pätz	0	0	2	0	2	0	1	X	5

==== Semifinals ====
Sunday, November 15, 10:00 am

Sheet 8	1	2	3	4	5	6	7	8	Final
(Japan) Ikue Kitazawa 🔨	1	0	1	0	1	1	2	X	6
(British Columbia) Team MacMillan	0	1	0	1	0	0	0	X	2

Sheet 4	1	2	3	4	5	6	7	8	Final
(Japan) Miku Nihira 🔨	0	0	2	0	1	0	2	0	5
(Switzerland) Alina Pätz	1	2	0	2	0	1	0	1	7

==== Final ====
Sunday, November 15, 2:00 pm

Sheet 2	1	2	3	4	5	6	7	8	Final
(Japan) Ikue Kitazawa 🔨	1	0	0	2	0	1	0	0	4
(Switzerland) Alina Pätz	0	1	0	0	1	0	2	1	5
