= Colin Kurz =

Canadian curler

- Curler

Team
- Curling club: Assiniboine Memorial CC, Winnipeg, MB
Medal record
Men's curling
Representing Canada
World Mixed Curling Championship
Gold medal – first place	2019 Aberdeen
Representing Manitoba
Gold medal – first place	2015 Prince George

Colin Kurz is a Canadian curler from Winnipeg, Manitoba.

He played as skip for the Canadian mixed curling team at the 2019 World Mixed Curling Championship, where his team won the gold medal. Kurz in his junior career also won a gold medal skipping Team Manitoba at the 2015 Canada Winter Games..

== Teams ==
=== Men's ===
Season	Skip	Third	Second	Lead
2014-15	Colin Kurz	Ryan Lemoine	Weston Oryniak	Brendan Bilawka
2015-16	Colin Kurz	Ryan Lemoine	Weston Oryniak	Brendan Bilawka
2017-18	J.T. Ryan	Jacques Gauthier	Colin Kurz	Brendan Bilawka
2019-20	J.T. Ryan	Colin Kurz	Brendan Bilawka	Cole Chandler
2020-21	J.T. Ryan	Colin Kurz	Joey Hart	Brendan Bilawka
2021-22	J.T. Ryan	Colin Kurz	Brendan Bilawka	Tyler Forrest
2022-23	J.T. Ryan	Colin Kurz	Austin Pearson	Brandon Radford

=== Mixed ===
Season	Skip	Third	Second	Lead	Events
2018-19	Colin Kurz	Meghan Walter	Brendan Bilawka	Sara Oliver	CMxCC 2019 (gold); WMxCC 2019 (gold)
2026-27	Colin Kurz	Meghan Walter	Brendan Bilawka	Sara Krym	CMxCC 2026 (7th)

== Personal life ==
He attended the University of Manitoba.
