= 2019 Canadian Mixed Curling Championship =

- Host city: Winnipeg, Manitoba
- Arena: Fort Rouge Curling Club
- Dates: November 4–10, 2018
- Winner: Manitoba
- Curling club: Assiniboine Memorial Curling Club, Winnipeg
- Skip: Colin Kurz
- Third: Meghan Walter
- Second: Brendan Bilawka
- Lead: Sara Oliver
- Finalist: Nova Scotia (Kendal Thompson)

The 2019 Canadian Mixed Curling Championship was held from November 4 to 10, 2018 at the Fort Rouge Curling Club in Winnipeg, Manitoba. Team Manitoba, as champions, represented Canada at the 2019 World Mixed Curling Championship where they won the gold medal.

== Teams ==
The teams are listed as follows:

Team	Skip	Third	Second	Lead	Locale
Alberta	Kurt Balderston	Janais DeJong	Les Sonnenberg	Adrienne Winfield	Grande Prairie Curling Club, Grande Prairie
British Columbia	Cody Tanaka	Shawna Jensen	Travis Cameron	Catera Park	Richmond Curling Club, Richmond
Manitoba	Colin Kurz	Meghan Walter	Brendan Bilawka	Sara Oliver	Assiniboine Memorial Curling Club, Winnipeg
New Brunswick	Chris Jeffrey	Jillian Keough	Brian King	Katie Forward	Gage Golf and Curling Club, Oromocto
Newfoundland and Labrador	Harold Walters	Wendy Dunne	Stephen Trickett	Carolyn Walters	RE/MAX Centre, St. John's
Northern Ontario	Trever Bonot	Jackie McCormick	Mike McCarville	Angela Lee-Wiwcharyk	Port Arthur Curling Club, Thunder Bay
Northwest Territories	Mel Sittichinli	Alison Lennie	Georgie Greenland	Eleanor Jerome	Inuvik Curling Club, Inuvik
Nova Scotia	Kendal Thompson	Marie Christianson	Bryce Everist	Karlee Jones	Mayflower Curling Club, Halifax
Nunavut	Ed MacDonald	Denise Hutchings	Gregory Howard	Sadie Pinksen	Iqaluit Curling Club, Iqaluit
Ontario	Wayne Tuck Jr.	Kimberly Tuck	Wesley Forget	Sara Gatchell	Ilderton Curling Club, Thornhill
Prince Edward Island	Erik Broderson (fourth)	Melissa Morrow (skip)	Andrew Mcdougall	Alison Griffin	Charlottetown Curling Complex, Charlottetown; Silver Fox Curling Club, Summerside
Quebec	Félix Asselin	Laurie St-Georges	Émile Asselin	Emily Riley	Glenmore Curling Club, Dollard-des-Ormeaux; Club de curling Laval-sur-le-Lac, Laval; Baie d'Urfé Curling Club, Baie d’Urfé
Saskatchewan	Jason Ackerman	Deanna Doig	Mitch Criton	Colleen Ackerman	Highland Curling Club, Regina
Yukon	Bob Smallwood	Jenna Duncan	Alex Peech	Jody Smallwood	Whitehorse Curling Club, Whitehorse

== Round robin ==
=== Standings ===
After Draw 11

Key
Teams to Championship Pool

Pool A	Skip	W	L
Quebec	Félix Asselin	5	1
Manitoba	Colin Kurz	4	2
Yukon	Bob Smallwood	4	2
Northern Ontario	Trevor Bonot	4	2
Saskatchewan	Jason Ackerman	3	3
Newfoundland and Labrador	Harold Walters	1	5
Nunavut	Ed MacDonald	0	6

Pool B	Skip	W	L
Ontario	Wayne Tuck Jr.	6	0
Nova Scotia	Kendal Thompson	5	1
Alberta	Kurt Balderston	4	2
British Columbia	Cody Tanaka	3	3
New Brunswick	Chris Jeffrey	2	4
Prince Edward Island	Melissa Morrow	1	5
Northwest Territories	Mel Sittichinli	0	6

=== Scores ===
==== Draw 1 ====
Sunday, November 4, 7:00pm

Sheet A	1	2	3	4	5	6	7	8	9	Final
Manitoba (Kurz)	0	1	1	0	0	0	1	1	0	4
Quebec (Asselin) 🔨	0	0	0	1	1	2	0	0	1	5

Sheet B	1	2	3	4	5	6	7	8	Final
Northern Ontario (Bonot)	1	3	1	0	2	0	2	X	9
Nunavut (MacDonald) 🔨	0	0	0	1	0	1	0	X	2

Sheet C	1	2	3	4	5	6	7	8	Final
Ontario (Tuck)	1	2	0	2	0	4	X	X	9
Prince Edward Island (Morrow) 🔨	0	0	1	0	1	0	X	X	2

Sheet D	1	2	3	4	5	6	7	8	Final
Northwest Territories (Sittichinli)	0	0	0	0	0	0	X	X	0
Nova Scotia (Thompson) 🔨	5	0	3	1	1	2	X	X	12

==== Draw 2 ====
Monday, November 5, 10:00am

Sheet A	1	2	3	4	5	6	7	8	Final
Saskatchewan (Ackerman)	2	2	0	0	0	2	0	X	6
Nunavut (MacDonald) 🔨	0	0	1	0	1	0	2	X	4

Sheet B	1	2	3	4	5	6	7	8	9	Final
Newfoundland and Labrador (Walters)	1	0	2	0	2	0	3	0	0	8
Yukon (Smallwood) 🔨	0	3	0	2	0	2	0	1	1	9

Sheet C	1	2	3	4	5	6	7	8	Final
Alberta (Balderston) 🔨	0	1	0	0	1	1	0	1	4
British Columbia (Tanaka)	2	0	0	0	0	0	1	0	3

Sheet D	1	2	3	4	5	6	7	8	Final
New Brunswick (Jeffrey)	0	1	1	0	1	0	2	1	6
Prince Edward Island (Morrow) 🔨	2	0	0	1	0	1	0	0	4

==== Draw 3 ====
Monday, November 5, 2:00pm

Sheet B	1	2	3	4	5	6	7	8	Final
Northwest Territories (Sittichinli)	0	1	0	0	1	0	1	X	3
Ontario (Tuck) 🔨	3	0	2	4	0	1	0	X	10

Sheet D	1	2	3	4	5	6	7	8	Final
Manitoba (Kurz)	2	0	1	0	3	1	0	X	7
Northern Ontario (Bonot) 🔨	0	0	0	2	0	0	1	X	3

==== Draw 4 ====
Monday, November 5, 6:00pm

Sheet A	1	2	3	4	5	6	7	8	Final
Alberta (Balderston) 🔨	3	0	3	2	1	0	0	X	9
Prince Edward Island (Morrow)	0	1	0	0	0	2	1	X	4

Sheet B	1	2	3	4	5	6	7	8	Final
Nova Scotia (Thompson)	0	1	1	1	0	0	1	X	4
British Columbia (Tanaka) 🔨	1	0	0	0	0	0	0	X	1

Sheet C	1	2	3	4	5	6	7	8	Final
Quebec (Asselin) 🔨	2	0	0	0	0	2	3	X	7
Yukon (Smallwood)	0	0	0	1	0	0	0	X	1

Sheet D	1	2	3	4	5	6	7	8	Final
Newfoundland and Labrador (Walters)	2	1	0	0	0	2	1	X	6
Nunavut (MacDonald) 🔨	0	0	0	0	1	0	0	X	1

==== Draw 5 ====
Tuesday, November 6, 8:00am

Sheet A	1	2	3	4	5	6	7	8	Final
Ontario (Tuck) 🔨	2	0	2	0	3	0	0	1	8
Nova Scotia (Thompson)	0	2	0	1	0	3	1	0	7

Sheet B	1	2	3	4	5	6	7	8	Final
Saskatchewan (Ackerman) 🔨	1	0	0	1	1	0	2	X	5
Manitoba (Kurz)	0	0	1	0	0	0	0	X	1

Sheet C	1	2	3	4	5	6	7	8	Final
New Brunswick (Jeffrey) 🔨	1	1	2	0	3	0	1	X	8
Northwest Territories (Sittichinli)	0	0	0	1	0	1	0	X	2

Sheet D	1	2	3	4	5	6	7	8	Final
Northern Ontario (Bonot) 🔨	1	0	1	3	0	2	0	X	7
Quebec (Asselin)	0	2	0	0	1	0	1	X	4

==== Draw 6 ====
Tuesday, November 6, 12:00pm

Sheet A	1	2	3	4	5	6	7	8	Final
British Columbia (Tanaka) 🔨	0	1	3	2	1	0	2	X	9
Northwest Territories (Sittichinli)	0	0	0	0	0	1	0	X	1

Sheet B	1	2	3	4	5	6	7	8	Final
New Brunswick (Jeffrey) 🔨	1	0	0	1	0	1	0	X	3
Alberta (Balderston)	0	3	1	0	1	0	1	X	6

Sheet C	1	2	3	4	5	6	7	8	Final
Saskatchewan (Ackerman) 🔨	0	1	0	1	0	2	3	X	7
Newfoundland and Labrador (Walters)	2	0	1	0	1	0	0	X	4

Sheet D	1	2	3	4	5	6	7	8	Final
Yukon (Smallwood)	0	2	0	1	0	1	0	X	4
Manitoba (Kurz) 🔨	4	0	1	0	1	0	2	X	8

==== Draw 7 ====
Tuesday, November 6, 4:00pm

Sheet A	1	2	3	4	5	6	7	8	Final
Newfoundland and Labrador (Walters) 🔨	0	1	0	0	1	0	0	X	2
Northern Ontario (Bonot)	1	0	1	2	0	1	1	X	6

Sheet B	1	2	3	4	5	6	7	8	Final
Nunavut (MacDonald) 🔨	1	0	0	0	0	1	0	X	2
Quebec (Asselin)	0	1	1	4	1	0	3	X	10

Sheet C	1	2	3	4	5	6	7	8	Final
Prince Edward Island (Morrow)	0	3	0	0	0	1	0	X	4
Nova Scotia (Thompson) 🔨	1	0	2	4	1	0	1	X	9

Sheet D	1	2	3	4	5	6	7	8	Final
Alberta (Balderston)	0	0	1	0	1	0	2	X	4
Ontario (Tuck) 🔨	1	1	0	3	0	3	0	X	8

==== Draw 8 ====
Tuesday, November 6, 8:00pm

Sheet A	1	2	3	4	5	6	7	8	Final
Yukon (Smallwood)	0	2	0	3	2	2	0	X	9
Saskatchewan (Ackerman) 🔨	1	0	2	0	0	0	0	X	3

Sheet B	1	2	3	4	5	6	7	8	Final
Prince Edward Island (Morrow)	2	3	2	4	0	1	X	X	12
Northwest Territories (Sittichinli) 🔨	0	0	0	0	1	0	X	X	1

Sheet C	1	2	3	4	5	6	7	8	Final
Nunavut (MacDonald)	0	0	0	0	1	0	X	X	1
Manitoba (Kurz) 🔨	0	2	2	1	0	4	X	X	9

Sheet D	1	2	3	4	5	6	7	8	Final
British Columbia (Tanaka) 🔨	0	1	0	0	1	1	0	2	5
New Brunswick (Jeffrey)	1	0	0	2	0	0	1	0	4

==== Draw 9 ====
Wednesday November 7, 10:00am

Sheet A	1	2	3	4	5	6	7	8	Final
Nova Scotia (Thompson) 🔨	0	3	0	2	0	2	0	X	7
New Brunswick (Jeffrey)	1	0	1	0	1	0	2	X	5

Sheet B	1	2	3	4	5	6	7	8	Final
Yukon (Smallwood)	3	0	4	0	2	0	1	X	10
Northern Ontario (Bonot) 🔨	0	2	0	2	0	2	0	X	6

Sheet C	1	2	3	4	5	6	7	8	Final
British Columbia (Tanaka) 🔨	0	1	0	0	1	0	X	X	2
Ontario (Tuck)	1	0	2	2	0	4	X	X	9

Sheet D	1	2	3	4	5	6	7	8	9	Final
Quebec (Asselin) 🔨	3	0	1	0	2	0	2	0	2	10
Saskatchewan (Ackerman)	0	3	0	2	0	1	0	2	0	8

==== Draw 10 ====
Wednesday November 7, 2:00pm

Sheet A	1	2	3	4	5	6	7	8	Final
Prince Edward Island (Morrow)	0	0	0	2	0	1	0	X	3
British Columbia (Tanaka) 🔨	1	0	1	0	3	0	0	X	5

Sheet B	1	2	3	4	5	6	7	8	Final
Manitoba (Kurz)	3	0	1	0	0	1	1	X	6
Newfoundland and Labrador (Walters) 🔨	0	1	0	1	0	0	0	X	2

Sheet C	1	2	3	4	5	6	7	8	Final
Northwest Territories (Sittichinli)	0	0	0	1	0	0	X	X	1
Alberta (Balderston) 🔨	1	3	2	0	3	5	X	X	14

Sheet D	1	2	3	4	5	6	7	8	Final
Nunavut (MacDonald)	0	2	1	0	1	0	1	X	5
Yukon (Smallwood) 🔨	3	0	0	3	0	1	0	X	7

==== Draw 11 ====
Wednesday November 7, 6:00pm

Sheet A	1	2	3	4	5	6	7	8	Final
Quebec (Asselin) 🔨	2	0	1	0	3	0	1	X	7
Newfoundland and Labrador (Walters)	0	1	0	1	0	1	0	X	3

Sheet B	1	2	3	4	5	6	7	8	Final
Ontario (Tuck)	0	2	0	0	2	0	3	X	7
New Brunswick (Jeffrey) 🔨	1	0	0	1	0	2	0	X	4

Sheet C	1	2	3	4	5	6	7	8	Final
Northern Ontario (Bonot) 🔨	0	0	3	1	0	1	0	0	5
Saskatchewan (Ackerman)	1	0	0	0	1	0	2	2	6

Sheet D	1	2	3	4	5	6	7	8	Final
Nova Scotia (Thompson)	0	1	0	0	0	0	5	X	6
Alberta (Balderston) 🔨	1	0	1	0	0	0	0	X	2

== Placement Round ==
=== Standings ===
Key
Teams to Playoffs

Championship Pool	Skip	W	L
Quebec	Félix Asselin	8	2
Manitoba	Colin Kurz	7	3
Ontario	Wayne Tuck Jr.	7	3
Nova Scotia	Kendal Thompson	7	3
Saskatchewan	Jason Ackerman	6	4
Alberta	Kurt Balderston	6	4
Yukon	Bob Smallwood	5	5
British Columbia	Cody Tanaka	5	5

Seeding Pool	Skip	W	L
New Brunswick	Chris Jeffrey	5	4
Northern Ontario	Trevor Bonot	5	4
Newfoundland and Labrador	Harold Walters	2	7
Northwest Territories	Mel Sittichinli	2	7
Prince Edward Island	Melissa Morrow	2	7
Nunavut	Ed MacDonald	0	9

=== Scores ===
==== Draw 12 ====
Thursday, November 8, 9:00am

Sheet A	1	2	3	4	5	6	7	8	Final
Nunavut (MacDonald)	0	0	0	0	1	0	X	X	1
New Brunswick (Jeffrey) 🔨	3	4	5	1	0	2	X	X	15

Sheet B	1	2	3	4	5	6	7	8	Final
Newfoundland and Labrador (Walters) 🔨	3	0	3	0	0	1	0	1	8
Prince Edward Island (Morrow)	0	1	0	1	1	0	2	0	5

Sheet C	1	2	3	4	5	6	7	8	Final
Northern Ontario (Bonot) 🔨	2	0	2	0	1	0	2	2	9
Northwest Territories (Sittichinli)	0	1	0	3	0	2	0	0	6

==== Draw 13 ====
Thursday, November 8, 12:30pm

Sheet A	1	2	3	4	5	6	7	8	Final
British Columbia (Tanaka) 🔨	0	3	0	1	0	1	0	1	6
Quebec (Asselin)	0	0	1	0	1	0	2	0	4

Sheet B	1	2	3	4	5	6	7	8	Final
Manitoba (Kurz) 🔨	1	1	0	0	0	0	1	X	3
Alberta (Balderston)	0	0	1	2	1	1	0	X	5

Sheet C	1	2	3	4	5	6	7	8	Final
Ontario (Tuck)	0	0	2	1	0	2	0	1	6
Yukon (Smallwood) 🔨	1	1	0	0	1	0	1	0	4

Sheet D	1	2	3	4	5	6	7	8	Final
Saskatchewan (Ackerman)	0	1	0	0	1	0	1	X	3
Nova Scotia (Thompson) 🔨	2	0	2	3	0	1	0	X	8

==== Draw 14 ====
Thursday, November 8, 4:00pm

Sheet B	1	2	3	4	5	6	7	8	Final
Northern Ontario (Bonot)	2	0	1	0	0	2	0	X	5
New Brunswick (Jeffrey) 🔨	0	4	0	0	3	0	2	X	9

Sheet C	1	2	3	4	5	6	7	8	Final
Prince Edward Island (Morrow) 🔨	2	1	0	1	3	5	X	X	12
Nunavut (MacDonald)	0	0	3	0	0	0	X	X	3

Sheet D	1	2	3	4	5	6	7	8	Final
Northwest Territories (Sittichinli) 🔨	0	1	0	1	0	0	1	1	4
Newfoundland and Labrador (Walters)	0	0	1	0	2	0	0	0	3

==== Draw 15 ====
Thursday, November 8, 7:30pm

Sheet A	1	2	3	4	5	6	7	8	Final
Yukon (Smallwood)	0	0	2	0	1	1	1	0	5
Nova Scotia (Thompson) 🔨	2	1	0	2	0	0	0	1	6

Sheet B	1	2	3	4	5	6	7	8	Final
Ontario (Tuck)	0	2	0	0	0	0	0	1	3
Saskatchewan (Ackerman) 🔨	0	0	1	1	1	1	0	0	4

Sheet C	1	2	3	4	5	6	7	8	Final
Quebec (Asselin) 🔨	0	0	0	1	0	2	0	1	4
Alberta (Balderston)	0	0	1	0	1	0	1	0	3

Sheet D	1	2	3	4	5	6	7	8	Final
British Columbia (Tanaka)	0	3	0	1	2	0	0	0	6
Manitoba (Kurz) 🔨	2	0	2	0	0	1	1	1	7

==== Draw 16 ====
Friday, November 9, 10:00am

Sheet A	1	2	3	4	5	6	7	8	Final
Manitoba (Kurz)	0	1	0	3	0	2	0	1	7
Ontario (Tuck) 🔨	1	0	2	0	1	0	1	0	5

Sheet B	1	2	3	4	5	6	7	8	Final
Nova Scotia (Thompson)	0	0	2	0	0	1	0	X	3
Quebec (Asselin) 🔨	0	1	0	3	2	0	2	X	8

Sheet C	1	2	3	4	5	6	7	8	Final
Saskatchewan (Ackerman) 🔨	0	0	0	0	0	1	0	X	1
British Columbia (Tanaka)	1	2	1	1	1	0	1	X	7

Sheet D	1	2	3	4	5	6	7	8	Final
Alberta (Balderston) 🔨	3	0	0	2	0	2	0	X	7
Yukon (Smallwood)	0	1	0	0	1	0	2	X	4

==== Draw 17 ====
Friday, November 9, 2:00pm

Sheet B	1	2	3	4	5	6	7	8	Final
Nunavut (MacDonald) 🔨	0	1	0	0	0	0	0	X	1
Northwest Territories (Sittichinli)	1	0	1	1	2	2	3	X	10

Sheet C	1	2	3	4	5	6	7	8	Final
New Brunswick (Jeffrey) 🔨	0	1	3	1	1	1	1	X	8
Newfoundland and Labrador (Walters)	2	0	0	0	0	0	0	X	2

Sheet D	1	2	3	4	5	6	7	8	Final
Prince Edward Island (Morrow)	0	1	0	1	0	0	2	0	4
Northern Ontario (Bonot) 🔨	2	0	1	0	1	1	0	1	6

==== Draw 18 ====
Friday, November 9, 6:00pm

Sheet A	1	2	3	4	5	6	7	8	Final
Alberta (Balderston) 🔨	0	0	0	3	0	0	0	0	3
Saskatchewan (Ackerman)	0	0	3	0	1	0	1	1	6

Sheet B	1	2	3	4	5	6	7	8	Final
Yukon (Smallwood) 🔨	1	0	0	2	0	4	0	2	9
British Columbia (Tanaka)	0	2	1	0	1	0	3	0	7

Sheet C	1	2	3	4	5	6	7	8	9	Final
Nova Scotia (Thompson) 🔨	1	0	2	1	0	2	1	0	0	7
Manitoba (Kurz)	0	3	0	0	3	0	0	1	1	8

Sheet D	1	2	3	4	5	6	7	8	Final
Quebec (Asselin) 🔨	1	1	1	0	1	0	3	X	7
Ontario (Tuck)	0	0	0	1	0	1	0	X	2

== Playoffs ==
Semifinals
1	Quebec	3
4	Nova Scotia	5
2	Manitoba	9
3	Ontario	1

Final
4	Nova Scotia	4
2	Manitoba	7

Bronze medal game
1	Quebec	7
3	Ontario	6

=== Semifinals ===
Saturday, November 10, 10:00 am

Sheet C	1	2	3	4	5	6	7	8	Final
Ontario (Tuck)	0	1	0	0	0	0	X	X	1
Manitoba (Kurz) 🔨	2	0	1	1	0	5	X	X	9

Sheet D	1	2	3	4	5	6	7	8	Final
Nova Scotia (Thompson)	0	1	0	2	1	0	1	X	5
Quebec (Asselin) 🔨	1	0	1	0	0	1	0	X	3

=== Bronze medal game ===
Saturday, November 10, 2:30 pm

Sheet C	1	2	3	4	5	6	7	8	9	Final
Quebec (Asselin) 🔨	2	1	0	0	0	0	3	0	1	7
Ontario (Tuck)	0	0	2	2	1	0	0	1	0	6

=== Final ===
Saturday, November 10, 2:30 pm

Sheet D	1	2	3	4	5	6	7	8	Final
Nova Scotia (Thompson)	0	1	0	0	2	0	1	0	4
Manitoba (Kurz) 🔨	1	0	1	2	0	1	0	2	7
