= Stu Sells 1824 Halifax Classic =

- Established: 2018
- Host city: Halifax, Nova Scotia
- Arena: Halifax Curling Club
- Men's purse: $25,500
- Women's purse: $25,500

Current champions (2026)
- Men: (Switzerland) Marco Hösli
- Women: (Switzerland) Alina Pätz

Current edition
- 2026 Stu Sells 1824 Halifax Classic

Location in Canada

The Stu Sells 1824 Halifax Classic is an annual bonspiel on the men's World Curling Tour. It is held annually in November at the Halifax Curling Club in Halifax, Nova Scotia (the club was founded in 1824). It has been held since 2018. The event is part of the "Stu Sells Series" of curling events (along with the Stu Sells Oakville Tankard, and the Stu Sells Toronto Tankard), sponsored by the Stu Sells Realty Team.

Team Glenn Howard won both the 2018 and 2019 events. Glenn Howard himself was away coaching the Scottish women's team at the 2018 European Curling Championships, so his son, Scott skipped the team to the inaugural championship in 2018.

Team Brad Gushue won the 2020 event, which only consisted of teams from Atlantic Canada due to travel restrictions imposed by the COVID-19 pandemic. These same restrictions prevented Team Gushue's lead Geoff Walker from playing in the event, and he was replaced by Ryan McNeil Lamswood.

A women's event was added in 2021.

== Past champions ==
=== Men ===
Year	Winning team	Runner up team	Purse (CAD)	Winner's share (CAD)
2018	(Ontario) Scott Howard, Adam Spencer, David Mathers, Tim March	(Newfoundland and Labrador) Brad Gushue, Mark Nichols, Brett Gallant, Geoff Walker	$25,000	$8,000
2019	(Ontario) Glenn Howard, Scott Howard, David Mathers, Tim March	(Nova Scotia) Jamie Murphy, Paul Flemming, Scott Saccary, Philip Crowell	$35,000	$11,000
2020	(Newfoundland and Labrador) Brad Gushue, Mark Nichols, Brett Gallant, Ryan McNeil Lamswood	(Nova Scotia) Matthew Manuel, Luke Saunders, Jeffrey Meagher, Ryan Abraham	$20,000	$6,000
2021	(Nova Scotia) Stuart Thompson, Kendal Thompson, Colten Steele, Michael Brophy	(Quebec) Félix Asselin, Martin Crête, Jean-François Trépanier (3 player team)	$24,000	$7,500
2022	(Ontario) John Epping, Mat Camm, Pat Janssen, Scott Chadwick	(Ontario) Jason Camm, Ian Dickie, Zack Shurtleff, Punit Sthankiya	$24,000	$7,500
2023	(Quebec) Félix Asselin, Martin Crête, Émile Asselin, Jean-François Trépanier	(Ontario) Sam Mooibroek, Scott Mitchell, Nathan Steele, Colin Schnurr, Wyatt Small	$25,500	$8,000
2024	(South Korea) Jeong Byeong-jin, Lee Jeong-jae, Kim Min-woo, Kim Jeong-min	(Ontario) Sam Mooibroek, Ryan Wiebe, Scott Mitchell, Nathan Steele	$25,500	$8,000
2025	(New Brunswick) James Grattan, Joel Krats, Andy McCann, Noah Riggs	(Newfoundland and Labrador) Adam Boland, Stephen Trickett, Zach Young, Alex Smith	$25,500	$8,000
2026	(Switzerland) Philipp Hösli (Fourth), Marco Hösli (Skip), Simon Gloor, Justin Hausherr	(Switzerland) Benoît Schwarz-van Berkel (Fourth), Yannick Schwaller (Skip), Sven Michel, Pablo Lachat-Couchepin	$25,500	$8,000

=== Women ===
Year	Winning team	Runner up team	Purse (CAD)	Winner's share (CAD)
2021	(Prince Edward Island) Suzanne Birt, Marie Christianson, Meaghan Hughes, Michelle McQuaid	(Switzerland) Briar Hürlimann, Melina Bezzola, Anna Gut (3 player team)	$24,000	$7,500
2022	(Manitoba) Selena Njegovan, Laura Walker, Jocelyn Peterman, Kristin MacCuish	(Nova Scotia) Christina Black, Jenn Baxter, Karlee Everist, Shelley Barker	$24,000	$7,500
2023	(Switzerland) Alina Pätz (Fourth), Silvana Tirinzoni (Skip), Selina Witschonke, Carole Howald	(Manitoba) Chelsea Carey, Karlee Burgess, Emily Zacharias, Lauren Lenentine	$25,500	$8,000
2024	(Scotland) Rebecca Morrison (Fourth), Jennifer Dodds, Sophie Sinclair, Sophie Jackson (Skip)	(Nova Scotia) Christina Black, Jill Brothers, Jenn Baxter, Karlee Everist, Marlee Powers	$19,125	$6,000
2025	(Nova Scotia) Christina Black, Jill Brothers, Jenn Baxter, Karlee Everist, Marlee Powers	(Ontario) Danielle Inglis, Kira Brunton, Calissa Daly, Cassandra de Groot	$25,500	$8,000
2026	(Switzerland) Alina Pätz, Selina Witschonke, Stefanie Berset, Renée Frigo	(Japan) Ikue Kitazawa, Seina Nakajima, Minori Suzuki, Hasumi Ishigooka	$25,500	$8,000
