= 2013 Canadian Mixed Curling Championship =

- Host city: Mount Royal, Quebec
- Arena: Town of Mount Royal Curling Club
- Dates: November 15–24, 2012
- Winner: Ontario
- Curling club: Orillia CC, Orillia
- Skip: Cory Heggestad
- Third: Heather Graham
- Second: Greg Balsdon
- Lead: Amy Mackay
- Finalist: Nova Scotia (Brent MacDougall)

The 2013 Canadian Mixed Curling Championship was held from November 15 to 24, 2012 at the Town of Mount Royal Curling Club in Mount Royal, Quebec. This edition marked the fiftieth edition of the Canadian Mixed Curling Championship and the third time that the province of Quebec has hosted the Canadian Mixed Championship. This edition also marked the first time that the qualifying round for relegated teams was implemented in the championship. In the final, Ontario, skipped by Cory Heggestad, defeated Nova Scotia, skipped by Brent MacDougall, with a score of 10–3 in eight ends. Heggestad and his team won their first Canadian Mixed title, and Ontario won its third title in the championships.

The four winning players were invited to play as two separate pairs at the inaugural 2013 Canadian Mixed Doubles Curling Trials, though they did not participate.

== Qualifying round ==
Four associations did not automatically qualify to the championships, and participated in a qualifying round. Two qualification spots were awarded to the two winners of a double knockout round.

=== Teams ===
The teams are listed as follows:

Province	Skip	Third	Second	Lead	Locale
Newfoundland and Labrador	Kenny Young	Amanda Rumboldt	Stephen Sheppard	Donna Davis	Corner Brook CC, Corner Brook
Nova Scotia	Brent MacDougall	Christina Black	Kris Granchelli	Jane Snyder	Mayflower CC, Halifax
Nunavut	Ed Sattelberger	D'Arcy Masson	Dennis Masson	Chantelle Masson	Iqaluit CC, Iqaluit
Yukon	Steve Fecteau	Helen Strong	Wade Scoffin	Patti Willingham	Whitehorse CC, Whitehorse

=== Knockout brackets ===
First Knockout			Qualifier 1
1	Newfoundland and Labrador	4
4	Yukon	9	4	Yukon	5
2	Nova Scotia	12	2	Nova Scotia	8
3	Nunavut	3

Second Knockout			Qualifier 2
1	Newfoundland and Labrador	8
3	Nunavut	10	4	Yukon	10
			3	Nunavut	4

=== Knockout results ===
All draw times are listed in Eastern Standard Time (UTC–5).

==== First knockout ====
Thursday, November 15, 2:00 pm

Sheet A	1	2	3	4	5	6	7	8	9	10	Final
Newfoundland and Labrador (Young)	0	0	3	1	0	0	0	0	X	X	4
Yukon (Fecteau) 🔨	1	0	0	0	4	1	2	1	X	X	9

Sheet B	1	2	3	4	5	6	7	8	9	10	Final
Nova Scotia (MacDougall)	0	1	0	4	0	3	0	4	X	X	12
Nunavut (Sattelberger) 🔨	0	0	1	0	1	0	1	0	X	X	3

Thursday, March 15, 7:00 pm

Sheet C	1	2	3	4	5	6	7	8	9	10	Final
Yukon (Fecteau) 🔨	1	0	1	0	1	0	1	0	1	0	5
Nova Scotia (MacDougall)	0	1	0	1	0	3	0	1	0	2	8

==== Second knockout ====
Thursday, November 15, 7:00 pm

Sheet D	1	2	3	4	5	6	7	8	9	10	Final
Nunavut (Sattelberger) 🔨	1	2	1	0	1	0	0	3	2	0	10
Newfoundland and Labrador (Young)	0	0	0	1	0	4	2	0	0	1	8

Friday, November 16, 2:00 pm

Sheet B	1	2	3	4	5	6	7	8	9	10	Final
Nunavut (Sattelberger)	0	1	0	1	0	2	0	0	X	X	4
Yukon (Fecteau) 🔨	2	0	2	0	3	0	2	1	X	X	10

== Teams ==
The teams are listed as follows:

Team	Skip	Third	Second	Lead	Locale
Alberta	Kurt Balderston	Cheryl Bernard	Del Shaughnessy	Stephanie Malekoff	Grande Prairie CC, Grande Prairie
British Columbia	Tom Buchy	Lori Buchy	Dave Toffolo	Robyn Toffolo	Kimberley CC, Kimberley
Manitoba	Terry McNamee	Kerri Einarson	Kyle Einarson	Stacey Fordyce	Brandon CC, Brandon
New Brunswick	James Grattan	Rebecca Atkinson	Kevin Boyle	Jane Boyle	Gage G&CC, Oromocto
Northern Ontario	Mike Assad	Ashley Kallos	Tayler Kallos	Kady Stachiw	Fort William CC, Thunder Bay
Northwest Territories	Nick Saturnino	Stephanie Crocker	Richard Gordon	Eileen McKay-Saturnino	Inuvik CC, Inuvik
Nova Scotia	Brent MacDougall	Christina Black	Kris Granchelli	Jane Snyder	Mayflower CC, Halifax
Ontario	Cory Heggestad	Heather Marshall	Greg Balsdon	Amy MacKay	Orillia CC, Orillia
Prince Edward Island	Robert Campbell	Rebecca Jean MacDonald	Robbie Doherty	Jackie Reid	Charlottetown CC, Charlottetown
Quebec	Mike Fournier	Alanna Routledge	Mike Kennedy	Joëlle St-Hilaire	Glenmore CC, Dollard-des-Ormeaux
Saskatchewan	Jeff Hartung	Brooklyn Lemon	Kody Hartung	Nicole Lang	Langenburg CC, Langenburg
Yukon	Steve Fecteau	Helen Strong	Wade Scoffin	Patti Willingham	Whitehorse CC, Whitehorse

== Round-robin standings ==
Final round-robin standings

Key
Teams to Playoffs

Province	Skip	W	L
Nova Scotia	Brent MacDougall	9	2
Ontario	Cory Heggestad	9	2
Quebec	Mike Fournier	8	3
New Brunswick	James Grattan	7	4
Saskatchewan	Jeff Hartung	6	5
Northern Ontario	Mike Assad	6	5
Alberta	Kurt Balderston	5	6
British Columbia	Tom Buchy	5	6
Prince Edward Island	Robert Campbell	5	6
Manitoba	Terry McNamee	4	7
Northwest Territories	Nick Saturnio	2	9
Yukon	Steve Fecteau	0	11

== Round-robin results ==
All draw times are listed in Eastern Standard Time (UTC–5).

=== Draw 1 ===
Saturday, November 17, 6:00 pm

Sheet B	1	2	3	4	5	6	7	8	9	10	Final
Prince Edward Island (Campbell) 🔨	1	0	1	0	1	0	0	0	X	X	3
Nova Scotia (MacDougall)	0	1	0	2	0	3	1	2	X	X	9

Sheet C	1	2	3	4	5	6	7	8	9	10	Final
British Columbia (Buchy)	0	1	1	0	2	3	0	3	X	X	10
Northwest Territories (Saturnio) 🔨	1	0	0	1	0	0	1	0	X	X	3

Sheet D	1	2	3	4	5	6	7	8	9	10	Final
Manitoba (McNamee)	0	0	1	0	3	0	1	0	0	X	5
Saskatchewan (Hartung) 🔨	0	3	0	1	0	1	0	1	1	X	7

Sheet E	1	2	3	4	5	6	7	8	9	10	Final
Yukon (Fecteau) 🔨	1	0	0	2	0	1	1	0	0	X	5
Quebec (Fournier)	0	2	1	0	3	0	0	1	2	X	9

=== Draw 2 ===
Sunday, November 18, 10:00 am

Sheet B	1	2	3	4	5	6	7	8	9	10	Final
New Brunswick (Grattan) 🔨	2	2	1	0	0	0	2	1	X	X	8
Ontario (Heggestad)	0	0	0	1	1	1	0	0	X	X	3

Sheet C	1	2	3	4	5	6	7	8	9	10	Final
Nova Scotia (MacDougall)	0	3	4	0	1	0	1	X	X	X	9
Yukon (Fecteau) 🔨	1	0	0	1	0	1	0	X	X	X	3

Sheet D	1	2	3	4	5	6	7	8	9	10	Final
Quebec (Fournier) 🔨	0	1	0	1	0	3	2	2	0	1	10
Prince Edward Island (Campbell)	2	0	1	0	2	0	0	0	2	0	7

Sheet E	1	2	3	4	5	6	7	8	9	10	Final
Northern Ontario (Assad)	1	0	1	0	1	2	0	1	2	0	8
Alberta (Balderston) 🔨	0	1	0	2	0	0	2	0	0	1	6

=== Draw 3 ===
Sunday, November 18, 2:30 pm

Sheet B	1	2	3	4	5	6	7	8	9	10	Final
Northwest Territories (Saturnio)	0	0	1	0	0	0	0	X	X	X	1
Northern Ontario (Assad) 🔨	3	3	0	2	4	1	1	X	X	X	14

Sheet C	1	2	3	4	5	6	7	8	9	10	Final
Manitoba (McNamee)	3	4	0	0	0	0	0	0	0	1	8
Ontario (Heggestad) 🔨	0	0	0	1	2	1	1	3	1	0	9

Sheet D	1	2	3	4	5	6	7	8	9	10	Final
British Columbia (Buchy)	0	1	0	1	0	1	0	2	1	0	6
Alberta (Balderston) 🔨	2	0	2	0	2	0	1	0	0	1	8

Sheet E	1	2	3	4	5	6	7	8	9	10	Final
New Brunswick (Grattan)	0	1	0	1	0	1	0	1	0	X	4
Saskatchewan (Hartung) 🔨	0	0	3	0	2	0	1	0	5	X	11

=== Draw 4 ===
Sunday, November 18, 7:00 pm

Sheet B	1	2	3	4	5	6	7	8	9	10	Final
Yukon (Fecteau)	1	0	1	0	1	0	1	0	0	X	4
Manitoba (McNamee) 🔨	0	1	0	1	0	1	0	2	2	X	7

Sheet C	1	2	3	4	5	6	7	8	9	10	Final
Saskatchewan (Hartung)	0	2	0	1	0	0	0	0	X	X	3
Quebec (Fournier) 🔨	1	0	2	0	1	1	2	2	X	X	9

Sheet D	1	2	3	4	5	6	7	8	9	10	Final
Nova Scotia (MacDougall) 🔨	3	1	0	3	0	2	2	2	X	X	13
Northwest Territories (Saturnio)	0	0	3	0	1	0	0	0	X	X	4

Sheet E	1	2	3	4	5	6	7	8	9	10	Final
Prince Edward Island (Campbell)	0	1	1	0	0	1	0	1	0	X	4
British Columbia (Buchy) 🔨	1	0	0	3	1	0	3	0	2	X	10

=== Draw 5 ===
Monday, November 19, 10:00 am

Sheet C	1	2	3	4	5	6	7	8	9	10	11	Final
New Brunswick (Grattan)	0	1	0	4	0	0	0	2	0	0	1	8
Alberta (Balderston) 🔨	3	0	1	0	0	0	1	0	1	1	0	7

Sheet D	1	2	3	4	5	6	7	8	9	10	Final
Northern Ontario (Assad) 🔨	0	0	1	0	1	1	0	2	0	X	5
Ontario (Heggestad)	0	2	0	2	0	0	1	0	3	X	8

=== Draw 6 ===
Monday, November 19, 2:30 pm

Sheet B	1	2	3	4	5	6	7	8	9	10	Final
Quebec (Fournier)	0	4	0	2	0	0	3	0	0	X	9
British Columbia (Buchy) 🔨	1	0	1	0	1	1	0	1	1	X	6

Sheet C	1	2	3	4	5	6	7	8	9	10	Final
Northwest Territories (Saturnio)	0	2	0	1	0	0	1	0	X	X	4
Prince Edward Island (Campbell) 🔨	4	0	3	0	0	2	0	4	X	X	13

Sheet D	1	2	3	4	5	6	7	8	9	10	Final
Saskatchewan (Hartung) 🔨	1	0	0	2	0	5	0	0	3	X	11
Yukon (Fecteau)	0	0	1	0	1	0	2	1	0	X	5

Sheet E	1	2	3	4	5	6	7	8	9	10	Final
Nova Scotia (MacDougall)	0	0	1	0	0	2	0	1	0	X	4
Manitoba (McNamee) 🔨	0	2	0	1	1	0	1	0	1	X	6

=== Draw 7 ===
Monday, November 19, 7:00 pm

Sheet B	1	2	3	4	5	6	7	8	9	10	Final
Alberta (Balderston)	0	1	0	1	0	1	0	0	2	0	5
Prince Edward Island (Campbell) 🔨	2	0	1	0	1	0	1	1	0	1	7

Sheet C	1	2	3	4	5	6	7	8	9	10	Final
Nova Scotia (MacDougall) 🔨	3	0	0	0	2	0	1	0	0	0	6
Northern Ontario (Assad)	0	1	0	1	0	1	0	2	1	1	7

Sheet D	1	2	3	4	5	6	7	8	9	10	Final
New Brunswick (Grattan)	0	0	0	1	0	1	0	0	3	0	5
Quebec (Fournier) 🔨	0	0	1	0	1	0	2	1	0	1	6

Sheet E	1	2	3	4	5	6	7	8	9	10	Final
Ontario (Heggestad)	1	0	1	2	2	1	0	X	X	X	7
Yukon (Fecteau) 🔨	0	1	0	0	0	0	1	X	X	X	2

=== Draw 8 ===
Tuesday, November 20, 10:00 am

Sheet B	1	2	3	4	5	6	7	8	9	10	Final
Northern Ontario (Assad)	0	1	0	3	0	1	0	2	1	0	8
Quebec (Fournier) 🔨	2	0	2	0	2	0	1	0	0	2	9

Sheet C	1	2	3	4	5	6	7	8	9	10	Final
Yukon (Fecteau) 🔨	1	0	1	0	2	0	1	0	0	X	5
New Brunswick (Grattan)	0	2	0	2	0	3	0	1	1	X	9

Sheet D	1	2	3	4	5	6	7	8	9	10	Final
Ontario (Heggestad)	1	1	0	2	1	0	0	1	0	2	8
Prince Edward Island (Campbell) 🔨	0	0	2	0	0	1	1	0	1	0	5

Sheet E	1	2	3	4	5	6	7	8	9	10	Final
Alberta (Balderston)	0	0	1	0	0	2	1	0	X	X	4
Nova Scotia (MacDougall) 🔨	1	0	0	5	2	0	0	1	X	X	9

=== Draw 9 ===
Tuesday, November 20, 2:30 pm

Sheet B	1	2	3	4	5	6	7	8	9	10	Final
Northwest Territories (Saturnio)	0	0	2	0	1	1	0	0	0	X	4
New Brunswick (Grattan) 🔨	0	4	0	2	0	0	0	3	1	X	10

Sheet C	1	2	3	4	5	6	7	8	9	10	Final
Ontario (Heggestad)	1	0	1	1	2	0	2	0	1	X	8
British Columbia (Buchy) 🔨	0	2	0	0	0	1	0	1	0	X	4

Sheet D	1	2	3	4	5	6	7	8	9	10	Final
Alberta (Balderston) 🔨	0	2	1	0	2	0	1	0	1	X	7
Manitoba (McNamee)	0	0	0	1	0	2	0	1	0	X	4

Sheet E	1	2	3	4	5	6	7	8	9	10	Final
Saskatchewan (Hartung) 🔨	0	2	0	2	0	1	3	X	X	X	8
Northern Ontario (Assad)	1	0	1	0	0	0	0	X	X	X	2

=== Draw 10 ===
Tuesday, November 20, 7:00 pm

Sheet B	1	2	3	4	5	6	7	8	9	10	Final
Nova Scotia (MacDougall) 🔨	2	0	1	1	2	1	0	1	X	X	8
Saskatchewan (Hartung)	0	1	0	0	0	0	2	0	X	X	3

Sheet C	1	2	3	4	5	6	7	8	9	10	11	Final
Prince Edward Island (Campbell) 🔨	0	3	0	1	0	0	1	0	1	0	2	8
Manitoba (McNamee)	0	0	2	0	1	1	0	1	0	1	0	6

Sheet D	1	2	3	4	5	6	7	8	9	10	Final
Yukon (Fecteau) 🔨	2	0	0	0	1	0	2	0	0	X	5
British Columbia (Buchy)	0	1	1	1	0	2	0	3	2	X	10

Sheet E	1	2	3	4	5	6	7	8	9	10	Final
Northwest Territories (Saturnio)	0	0	1	1	3	0	1	1	0	4	11
Quebec (Fournier) 🔨	2	0	0	0	0	3	0	0	1	0	6

=== Draw 11 ===
Wednesday, November 21, 10:00 am

Sheet B	1	2	3	4	5	6	7	8	9	10	Final
Manitoba (McNamee)	0	1	0	1	0	1	0	1	1	X	5
British Columbia (Buchy) 🔨	2	0	2	0	1	0	2	0	0	X	7

Sheet C	1	2	3	4	5	6	7	8	9	10	Final
Quebec (Fournier)	0	2	1	0	2	0	1	0	1	0	7
Nova Scotia (MacDougall) 🔨	1	0	0	1	0	3	0	1	0	2	8

Sheet D	1	2	3	4	5	6	7	8	9	10	Final
Northwest Territories (Saturnio)	0	0	1	0	0	0	1	0	1	X	3
Saskatchewan (Hartung) 🔨	2	0	0	1	0	0	0	3	0	X	6

Sheet E	1	2	3	4	5	6	7	8	9	10	Final
Yukon (Fecteau)	0	1	0	1	1	0	2	0	X	X	5
Prince Edward Island (Campbell) 🔨	2	0	1	0	0	3	0	4	X	X	10

=== Draw 12 ===
Wednesday, November 21, 2:30 pm

Sheet B	1	2	3	4	5	6	7	8	9	10	Final
Quebec (Fournier)	0	4	0	1	0	2	0	0	3	X	10
Alberta (Balderston) 🔨	1	0	2	0	0	0	1	1	0	X	5

Sheet C	1	2	3	4	5	6	7	8	9	10	Final
Northern Ontario (Assad) 🔨	0	1	1	0	3	2	0	1	X	X	8
Yukon (Fecteau)	0	0	0	1	0	0	1	0	X	X	2

Sheet D	1	2	3	4	5	6	7	8	9	10	Final
Prince Edward Island (Campbell) 🔨	0	0	1	0	2	0	0	0	0	2	5
New Brunswick (Grattan)	0	1	0	1	0	0	1	0	0	0	3

Sheet E	1	2	3	4	5	6	7	8	9	10	Final
Nova Scotia (MacDougall) 🔨	1	0	1	0	5	0	0	4	X	X	11
Ontario (Heggestad)	0	1	0	1	0	1	1	0	X	X	4

=== Draw 13 ===
Wednesday, November 21, 7:00 pm

Sheet B	1	2	3	4	5	6	7	8	9	10	Final
Ontario (Heggestad) 🔨	4	0	1	3	1	0	0	X	X	X	9
Northwest Territories (Saturnio)	0	0	0	0	0	0	1	X	X	X	1

Sheet C	1	2	3	4	5	6	7	8	9	10	Final
Alberta (Balderston) 🔨	0	0	1	0	1	0	2	0	0	2	6
Saskatchewan (Hartung)	0	0	0	2	0	2	0	0	1	0	5

Sheet D	1	2	3	4	5	6	7	8	9	10	11	Final
British Columbia (Buchy)	0	2	0	1	0	0	1	0	1	2	0	7
Northern Ontario (Assad) 🔨	2	0	2	0	2	0	0	1	0	0	2	9

Sheet E	1	2	3	4	5	6	7	8	9	10	Final
Manitoba (McNamee) 🔨	0	2	0	2	0	2	0	0	X	X	6
New Brunswick (Grattan)	4	0	2	0	2	0	1	3	X	X	12

=== Draw 14 ===
Thursday, November 22, 10:00 am

Sheet B	1	2	3	4	5	6	7	8	9	10	Final
New Brunswick (Grattan)	0	0	0	2	2	0	1	0	5	X	10
Northern Ontario (Assad) 🔨	0	2	1	0	0	1	0	2	0	X	6

Sheet C	1	2	3	4	5	6	7	8	9	10	Final
Manitoba (McNamee) 🔨	3	0	0	1	0	0	3	2	X	X	9
Northwest Territories (Saturnio)	0	0	1	0	0	1	0	0	X	X	2

Sheet D	1	2	3	4	5	6	7	8	9	10	Final
Ontario (Heggestad) 🔨	0	3	0	0	0	3	0	3	0	0	9
Alberta (Balderston)	0	0	2	1	1	0	1	0	2	1	8

Sheet E	1	2	3	4	5	6	7	8	9	10	Final
British Columbia (Buchy)	0	0	2	1	0	0	2	1	0	1	7
Saskatchewan (Hartung) 🔨	0	4	0	0	0	1	0	0	1	0	6

=== Draw 15 ===
Thursday, November 22, 2:30 pm

Sheet B	1	2	3	4	5	6	7	8	9	10	11	Final
British Columbia (Buchy) 🔨	1	0	3	0	1	0	4	0	0	0	0	9
Nova Scotia (MacDougall)	0	3	0	1	0	2	0	1	1	1	1	10

Sheet C	1	2	3	4	5	6	7	8	9	10	Final
Saskatchewan (Hartung)	0	3	0	3	0	1	1	0	X	X	8
Prince Edward Island (Campbell) 🔨	1	0	1	0	0	0	0	1	X	X	3

Sheet D	1	2	3	4	5	6	7	8	9	10	Final
Yukon (Fecteau)	1	0	3	0	0	0	1	0	X	X	5
Northwest Territories (Saturnio) 🔨	0	5	0	2	1	1	0	3	X	X	12

Sheet E	1	2	3	4	5	6	7	8	9	10	Final
Quebec (Fournier)	0	0	2	2	0	2	0	0	1	1	8
Manitoba (McNamee) 🔨	1	0	0	0	1	0	2	2	0	0	6

=== Draw 16 ===
Thursday, November 22, 7:00 pm

Sheet B	1	2	3	4	5	6	7	8	9	10	Final
Alberta (Balderston) 🔨	2	0	4	0	0	1	0	2	X	X	9
Yukon (Fecteau)	0	1	0	0	1	0	2	0	X	X	4

Sheet C	1	2	3	4	5	6	7	8	9	10	Final
Quebec (Fournier)	0	0	0	1	0	1	2	0	0	X	4
Ontario (Heggestad) 🔨	0	2	1	0	1	0	0	2	1	X	7

Sheet D	1	2	3	4	5	6	7	8	9	10	Final
New Brunswick (Grattan)	0	2	1	0	1	0	1	0	1	0	6
Nova Scotia (MacDougall) 🔨	1	0	0	2	0	1	0	2	0	1	7

Sheet E	1	2	3	4	5	6	7	8	9	10	Final
Prince Edward Island (Campbell)	0	0	0	0	1	0	2	0	1	X	4
Northern Ontario (Assad) 🔨	1	0	1	1	0	2	0	1	0	X	6

=== Draw 17 ===
Friday, November 23, 9:00 am

Sheet B	1	2	3	4	5	6	7	8	9	10	Final
Saskatchewan (Hartung) 🔨	1	0	1	0	2	0	0	0	X	X	4
Ontario (Heggestad)	0	4	0	2	0	0	1	1	X	X	8

Sheet C	1	2	3	4	5	6	7	8	9	10	Final
British Columbia (Buchy)	0	0	1	1	0	2	0	X	X	X	4
New Brunswick (Grattan) 🔨	1	1	0	0	5	0	3	X	X	X	10

Sheet D	1	2	3	4	5	6	7	8	9	10	Final
Northern Ontario (Assad) 🔨	0	1	0	0	2	1	0	X	X	X	4
Manitoba (McNamee)	2	0	4	1	0	0	1	X	X	X	8

Sheet E	1	2	3	4	5	6	7	8	9	10	Final
Alberta (Balderston) 🔨	0	2	2	3	0	3	0	X	X	X	10
Northwest Territories (Saturnio)	0	0	0	0	1	0	2	X	X	X	3

== Playoffs ==
Semifinal			Final
			1	Nova Scotia	3
2	Ontario	9	2	Ontario	10
3	Quebec	8

=== Semifinal ===
Friday, November 23, 7:30 pm

Team	1	2	3	4	5	6	7	8	9	10	11	Final
Ontario (Heggestad) 🔨	0	0	1	0	3	0	2	0	2	0	1	9
Quebec (Fournier)	0	1	0	3	0	1	0	1	0	2	0	8

Player percentages
Quebec		Ontario	
Joëlle St-Hilaire	77%	Amy Mackay	70%
Mike Kennedy	82%	Greg Balsdon	72%
Alanna Routledge	75%	Heather Graham	76%
Mike Fournier	74%	Cory Heggestad	72%
Total	77%	Total	72%

=== Final ===
Saturday, November 24, 2:00 pm

Team	1	2	3	4	5	6	7	8	9	10	Final
Nova Scotia (MacDougall) 🔨	0	1	0	0	0	0	2	0	X	X	3
Ontario (Heggestad)	1	0	2	2	1	3	0	1	X	X	10

Player percentages
Nova Scotia		Ontario	
Jane Snyder	84%	Amy Mackay	91%
Kris Granchelli	84%	Greg Balsdon	81%
Christina Black	75%	Heather Graham	94%
Brent MacDougall	56%	Cory Heggestad	91%
Total	75%	Total	89%

2013 Canadian Mixed Curling Championship
(Ontario)
Ontario
3rd title

== Awards and honors ==
The following awards were given:

=== All-star team ===
The all-star team was chosen based on the highest player percentage for players at each position.

- Skip: (Nova Scotia) Brent MacDougall
- Third: (Alberta) Cheryl Bernard
- Second: (Alberta) Del Shaughnessy
- Lead: (Nova Scotia) Jane Snyder

=== Sportsmanship Awards ===
The sportsmanship awards were given based on votes from all of the players at the competition.

- Brent MacDougall, Nova Scotia skip
- Stephanie Crocker, Northwest Territories third
