= Meghan Walter =

Canadian curler

- Curler
- Born: February 22, 2002 (age 24); Winnipeg, Manitoba

Team
- Curling club: East St. Paul CC, East St. Paul, MB

Curling career
- Member Association: Manitoba
- Hearts: 2 (2023, 2024)
- Top CTRS ranking: 6th (2023–24)
Medal record
Curling
Representing Canada
World Mixed Championship
Gold medal – first place	2019 Aberdeen
Representing Manitoba
Scotties Tournament of Hearts
Bronze medal – third place	2024 Calgary

Meghan Walter (born February 22, 2002) is a Canadian curler from Winnipeg, Manitoba. She is a former World Mixed Curling Champion.

== Career ==
Walter skipped her own team throughout her junior career, however, struggled to make it out of the province. In 2017, her team of third Sara Oliver, second Morgan Reimer and lead Mackenzie Elias lost the provincial junior final to Shae Bevan. The following year, the team, now with third Erica Wiebe, went undefeated until the final where they lost to the Mackenzie Zacharias rink. Team Walter also lost back-to-back U18 finals in 2018 and 2019 to Emma Jensen.

During the 2018 Manitoba Scotties Tournament of Hearts, Walter played third for the Lisa Hale-Menard rink. The team finished with a 2–5 record through the round robin.

The 2019–20 season saw Team Walter win their first tour event at the Manitoba Curling Tour Classic, defeating Abby Ackland in the final. In the new year, the team won their first provincial title at the U18 championship, however, the 2020 Canadian U18 Curling Championships was cancelled due to the COVID-19 pandemic, so she never got to represent the province at the national level in U18. At the junior championship, they missed the playoffs with a 4–3 record. Also during the 2019–20 season, she was the alternate on the Beth Peterson rink for the 2020 Manitoba Scotties Tournament of Hearts where the team finished 2–3.

During the 2021–22 season, Team Walter made their first appearance on the national stage when they won the right to represent Manitoba at the 2021 World Junior Qualification Event. The team, now with third Lane Prokopowich, second Katie McKenzie and lead Mackenzie Elias finished 3–2 through the round robin to qualify for the playoffs. They then lost to Nova Scotia's Taylour Stevens 7–4 in the quarterfinals. Later in the season, the team qualified for the 2022 Manitoba Scotties Tournament of Hearts. They missed the playoffs with a 1–4 record. That season, Walter again joined Team Peterson as their alternate for the 2021 Canadian Olympic Curling Pre-Trials. There, the team missed the playoffs after a 1–5 record.

Following their last season of juniors, Walter and Elias joined forces with Abby Ackland and Sara Oliver to form a new team for the 2022–23 season. After a slow start, the team found their footing at the 2022 Western Showdown where they advanced all the way to the final before losing to Silvana Tirinzoni. The team again qualified at the 2022 Curlers Corner Autumn Gold Curling Classic where they lost in the quarterfinals to Gim Eun-ji. Team Ackland changed their lineup halfway through the season with Walter taking over as the new skip. This switch paid off immediately with the team winning the DeKalb Superspiel in December 2022. The team made their first Grand Slam event at the 2023 Canadian Open where they qualified for the playoffs through the B side. They then lost in the quarterfinals to Tean Gim. Walter herself had already played in a Slam that season, as she and Mackenzie Elias spared for the Casey Scheidegger rink at the 2022 Masters, playing third and lead on the team, which was skipped by Kate Hogan. The team finished 2–2 through the round robin before losing a tiebreaker to Chelsea Carey. Team Ackland competed in the 2023 Manitoba Scotties Tournament of Hearts where they finished 3–2 through the round robin. They went on to a 5–3 record in the championship pool, enough to qualify for a tiebreaker. There, they won 9–3 over Beth Peterson to qualify for the semifinal where they upset Kaitlyn Lawes 8–5. In the championship game, they lost 10–5 to Jennifer Jones, ending their run. Despite this, Team Ackland still qualified for the 2023 Scotties Tournament of Hearts as Wild Card #3 thanks to their CTRS points earned throughout the season. At the Hearts, the team finished fifth in their pool with a 3–5 record, earning wins over the Northwest Territories, New Brunswick, and the Yukon. Despite their success as a new team, Team Ackland disbanded at the end of the season.

For the 2023–24 season, Walter and Elias teamed up with Kate Cameron and Taylor McDonald to form a new squad. Cameron skipped the team with Walter playing third, McDonald at second and Elias at lead. The team had immediate success in their first event together, going undefeated to claim the 2023 Icebreaker Challenge. They continued to build momentum throughout their next few events, reaching the final of the Alberta Curling Series Major and the semifinals of the 2023 Saville Shootout and the Mother Club Fall Curling Classic. In Grand Slam play, the team played in four events but failed to reach the playoffs in any of them. At the 2024 Manitoba Scotties Tournament of Hearts, Team Cameron had a strong start with six straight wins to begin the event. They then lost their final two championship round games and the semifinal to Beth Peterson, eliminating them in third. However, their strong results throughout the season earned them an entry into the 2024 Scotties Tournament of Hearts in Calgary. For the Hearts, Kelsey Rocque took McDonald's place in the lineup as she was expecting her first child. Throughout the preliminary round, Team Cameron had mixed results but managed to win both their games on the final day of round robin to earn a championship round berth. There, they knocked off the four-time defending champions Team Kerri Einarson to earn a spot in the final four. After defeating Alberta's Selena Sturmay in the 3 vs. 4 game, they came up short against Jennifer Jones in the semifinal, earning the bronze medal.

On April 8, 2024, Walter announced she was stepping away from competitive curling to focus on her studies.

=== Mixed ===
In 2018, Walter qualified for the 2019 Canadian Mixed Curling Championship in Winnipeg, playing third on the Manitoba team led by Colin Kurz. The team finished 7–3 through the round robin and championship round to qualify for the playoffs as the second seed. They then beat Ontario 9–1 in the semifinal before winning 7–4 over Nova Scotia in the gold medal game. The win qualified the team to represent Canada at the 2019 World Mixed Curling Championship where they dominated through the round robin with a 7–0 record. In the playoffs, they scored wins over Sweden, Denmark and Norway to qualify for the gold medal game against Germany's Andy Kapp. There, the Canadian team scored two in the eighth end for a 6–5 win. With the win, Walter became the youngest ever world mixed champion. She was a Grade 12 student at Miles Macdonell Collegiate at the time. The World Curling Federation had only just recently lowered the minimum age to enter the event from 18.

== Personal life ==
Walter is originally from the East Kildonan neighbourhood of Winnipeg. She is currently a student at the University of Manitoba.

== Grand Slam record ==
Key
C	Champion
F	Lost in Final
SF	Lost in Semifinal
QF	Lost in Quarterfinals
R16	Lost in the round of 16
Q	Did not advance to playoffs
T2	Played in Tier 2 event
DNP	Did not participate in event
N/A	Not a Grand Slam event that season

Event	2022–23	2023–24
Tour Challenge	DNP	Q
The National	DNP	Q
Masters	Q	Q
Canadian Open	QF	Q

== Teams ==
Season	Skip	Third	Second	Lead
2016–17	Meghan Walter	Emilie Rafnson	Kendra Derbowka	Mackenzie Elias
2017–18	Meghan Walter	Sara Oliver	Morgan Reimer	Mackenzie Elias
2018–19	Meghan Walter	Erica Wiebe	Morgan Reimer	Mackenzie Elias
2019–20	Meghan Walter	Morgan Reimer	Lauryn Kuzyk	Mackenzie Elias
2020–21	Meghan Walter	Lane Prokopowich	Katie McKenzie	Mackenzie Elias
2021–22	Meghan Walter	Lane Prokopowich	Katie McKenzie	Mackenzie Elias
2022–23	Meghan Walter	Abby Ackland	Sara Oliver	Mackenzie Elias
2023–24	Kate Cameron	Meghan Walter	Taylor McDonald	Mackenzie Elias
