= Cory Heggestad =

Canadian curler

Cory Heggestad (born February 4, 1973, in Esterhazy, Saskatchewan) is a Canadian curler from Barrie, Ontario. He currently skips a team on the World Curling Tour.

Heggestad is a former Canadian Mixed Curling Champion. At the 2013 Canadian Mixed Curling Championship, he skipped a rink that included Heather Graham, Greg Balsdon and Amy MacKay to a national championship for Ontario. After posting a 9-2 round robin record, the team beat Quebec (skipped by Mike Fournier) and then Nova Scotia (Brent MacDougall) to claim the championship. The team represented Ontario once again at the 2014 Canadian Mixed Curling Championship, finishing the round robin tied for third with an 8-3 record. After beating New Brunswick's Sylvie Robichaud rink in a tie breaker, the team beat Saskatchewan's Shaun Meachem in the semi-final before losing to Alberta's Darren Moulding in the final.

Heggestad is originally from British Columbia. He moved to Ontario in 2001. Born with club feet, Heggestad wears a custom made "slip on slider", because ordinary curling shoes "make his foot flip over".
