= Heather Heggestad =

Canadian curler

Heather Heggestad (previously Heather Marshall and Heather Graham) is a Canadian curler from Barrie, Ontario. She currently skips a team on the World Curling Tour. Heggestad is originally from Gore Bay, Ontario.

Heggestad won two straight provincial mixed championships playing third for her then-boyfriend Cory Heggestad (2013 and 2014 events) and won the 2013 Canadian Mixed Curling Championship as a member of Team Ontario. She also played on the Ontario team at the 2014 Canadian Mixed Curling Championship, finishing second.

On the World Curling Tour, she has won two career bonspiels, the 2013 Stroud Sleeman Cash Spiel and the 2016 CookstownCash presented by Comco Canada Inc.

She qualified for her first Ontario Scotties Tournament of Hearts in 2017.

Heggestad is currently married to curler Cory Heggestad.
