= 2018 Manitoba Scotties Tournament of Hearts =

- Host city: Killarney, Manitoba
- Arena: Shamrock Centre
- Dates: January 10-14
- Winner: Team Jones
- Curling club: St. Vital CC, Winnipeg
- Skip: Jennifer Jones
- Third: Kaitlyn Lawes
- Second: Jill Officer
- Lead: Dawn McEwen
- Coach: Wendy Morgan
- Finalist: Darcy Robertson

The 2018 Manitoba Scotties Tournament of Hearts, the provincial women's curling championship of Manitoba, was held from January 10 to 14 at the Shamrock Centre in Killarney. The winning Jennifer Jones team represented Manitoba at the 2018 Scotties Tournament of Hearts in Penticton, British Columbia.

== Qualification Process ==
Qualification method	Berths	Qualifying team
CTRS leaders	2	Jennifer Jones; Kerri Einarson
Manitoba Tour	2	Darcy Robertson; Shannon Birchard
Berth Bonspiels	3	Barb Spencer; Jennifer Clark-Rouire; Kristy Watling
Norman Region	1	Jennifer Briscoe
Westman Region	3	Cheryl Reed; Tiffany McLean; Alyssa Calvert
Parkland Region	1	Lisa Hale-Menard
Winnipeg Region	2	Briane Meilleur; Joelle Brown
Interlake Region	1	Rebecca Lamb
Central Region	1	Mackenzie Zacharias

=== Top 5 Seeds ===
1. Jones

2. Einarson

3. Robertson

4. Birchard

5. Meilleur

== Teams ==
The teams are listed as follows:

Skip	Third	Second	Lead	Alternate	Club(s)
Shannon Birchard	Nicole Sigvaldason	Sheyna Andries	Mariah Mondor	Sarah Pyke	Thistle CC
Jennifer Briscoe	Sheri Horning	Courtney Reeves	Lorelle Weiss	Kelly Hause	Burntwood CC
Joelle Brown	Susan Baleja	Natalie Claude Harding	Carlene Strand	Colleen Kilagallen	Charleswood CC
Alyssa Calvert	Laryssa Stevenson	Kylee Calvert	Linsday Baldock		Carberry CC
Jennifer Clark-Rouire	Lisa DeRiviere	Jolene Callum	Sydney Arnal		Miami CC
Kerri Einarson	Selena Kaatz	Liz Fyfe	Kristin MacCuish		East. St Paul CC
Lisa Hale-Menard	Meghan Walter	Emilie Rafnson	Laurie Macdonnell		Dauphin CC
Jennifer Jones	Kaitlyn Lawes	Jill Officer	Dawn McEwen		St. Vital CC
Rebecca Lamb	Randine Baker	Brooklyn Meiklejohn	Jenessa Rutter	Kendra Derbowka	Stonewall CC
Tiffany McLean	Mallory Black	Hayley Surovy	Cassandra Lesiuk	Dori-Anne Vince	Brandon CC
Briane Meilleur	Breanne Knapp	Janelle Vachon	Sarah Neufeld		Fort Rouge CC
Cheryl Reed	Samantha Murata	Pam Robins	Roslynn Taylor		Brandon CC
Darcy Robertson	Karen Klein	Vanessa Foster	Theresa Cannon	Tanya Enns	Assiniboine Memorial CC
Barb Spencer	Katie Spencer	Holly Spencer	Allyson Spencer		Assiniboine Memorial CC
Christine MacKay (Fourth)	Kristy Watling (Skip)	Taylor Maida	Katrina Thiessen		Fort Rouge CC
Mackenzie Zacharias	Gaetanne Gauthier	Emily Zacharias	Ashley Groff		Altona CC

== Round-robin standings ==
Key
Teams to Playoffs
Teams to Tiebreaker

Asham Black Group	W	L
Jennifer Jones	6	1
Joelle Brown	5	2
Kristy Watling	4	3
Alyssa Calvert	4	3
Shannon Birchard	3	4
Briane Meilleur	3	4
Lisa Hale-Menard	2	5
Jennifer Briscoe	1	6

Asham "Express" Red Group	W	L
Kerri Einarson	7	0
Darcy Robertson	6	1
Barb Spencer	4	3
Mackenzie Zacharias	4	3
Jennifer Clark-Rouire	3	4
Rebecca Lamb	2	5
Cheryl Reed	1	6
Tiffany McLean	1	6

== Scores ==
=== January 10 ===
Draw 1

- Briscoe 9-8 Watling
- Birchard 7-6 Brown
- Jones 9-2 Hale-Menard
- Calvert 10-5 Meilleur

Draw 2

- Clark-Rouire 6-7 Lamb
- Robertson 12-6 McLean
- Zacharias 3-9 Einarson
- Reed 1-8 Spencer

Draw 3

- Jones 5-9 Brown
- Watling 8-5 Calvert
- Meilleur 10-3 Briscoe
- Birchard 4-10 Hale-Menard

Draw 4

- Einarson 7-4 McLean
- Clark-Rouire 7-4 Reed
- Spencer 9-5 Lamb
- Robertson 8-2 Zacharias

=== January 11 ===
Draw 5

- Birchard 9-3 Calvert
- Meilleur 9-2 Hale-Menard
- Watling 8-10 Brown
- Jones 11-6 Briscoe

Draw 6

- Robertson 8-1 Reed
- Spencer 7-5 Zacharias
- Clark-Rouire 8-3 McLean
- Einarson 10-1 Lamb

Draw 7

- Watling 11-3 Hale-Menard
- Jones 8-4 Calvert
- Birchard 8-1 Briscoe
- Meilleur 4-5 Brown

Draw 8

- Clark-Rouire 3-8 Zacharias
- Einarson 7-4 Reed
- Robertson 11-6 Lamb
- Spencer 10-3 McLean

=== January 12 ===
Draw 9

- Robertson 6-5 Spencer
- McLean 8-6 Lamb
- Reed 4-8 Zacharias
- Einarson 9-1 Clark-Rouire

Draw 10

- Birchard 6-10 Meilleur
- Brown 7-4 Briscoe
- Calvert 9-4 Hale-Menard
- Jones 8-4 Watling

Draw 11

- McLean 4-7 Zacharias
- Spencer 3-9 Clark-Rouire
- Einarson 7-4 Robertson
- Reed 5-10 Lamb

Draw 12

- Brown 7-3 Hale-Menard
- Meilleur 5-11 Watling
- Jones 12-0 Birchard
- Calvert 4-9 Briscoe

=== January 13 ===
Draw 13

- Einarson 7-5 Spencer
- Zacharias 8-5 Lamb
- Reed 7-3 McLean
- Robertson 7-4 Clark-Rouire

Draw 14

- Jones 9-4 Meilleur
- Hale-Menard 7-6 Briscoe
- Calvert 7-4 Brown
- Birchard 7-11 Watling

== Playoffs ==
Page playoff system
R1	Kerri Einarson	5
B1	Jennifer Jones	9
R2	Darcy Robertson	9
B2	Joelle Brown	7

Semifinal
R1	Kerri Einarson	7
R2	Darcy Robertson	9

Final
B1	Jennifer Jones	7
R2	Darcy Robertson	6

=== R1 vs B1 ===
Saturday, January 13, 8:00

Sheet C	1	2	3	4	5	6	7	8	9	10	Final
Kerri Einarson	0	1	1	0	0	2	0	1	0	0	5
Jennifer Jones	0	0	0	2	2	0	2	0	1	2	9

=== R2 vs B2 ===
Saturday, January 13, 8:00pm

Sheet B	1	2	3	4	5	6	7	8	9	10	11	Final
Darcy Robertson	3	0	2	0	2	0	0	0	0	0	2	9
Joelle Brown	0	2	0	1	0	1	0	1	1	1	0	7

=== Semifinal ===
Sunday, January 14, 9:30 am

Sheet C	1	2	3	4	5	6	7	8	9	10	Final
Kerri Einarson	2	0	0	0	0	2	2	0	1	0	7
Darcy Robertson	0	1	1	2	1	0	0	2	0	2	9

=== Final ===
Sunday, January 14, 3:30 pm

Sheet C	1	2	3	4	5	6	7	8	9	10	Final
Jennifer Jones	2	0	0	2	0	0	1	0	0	2	7
Darcy Robertson	0	1	0	0	1	0	0	3	1	0	6

2018 Manitoba Scotties Tournament of Hearts

Jennifer Jones
8th Manitoba Provincial Championship title
