= 2018 Canada Cup =

2018 Home Hardware Canada Cup
- Host city: Estevan, Saskatchewan
- Arena: Affinity Place
- Dates: December 5–9
- Men's winner: (Ontario) Team Jacobs
- Curling club: Community First CC, Sault Ste. Marie, Ontario
- Skip: Brad Jacobs
- Third: Marc Kennedy
- Second: E. J. Harnden
- Lead: Ryan Harnden
- Coach: Adam Kingsbury
- Finalist: (Alberta) Kevin Koe
- Women's winner: (Manitoba) Team Jones
- Curling club: St. Vital CC, Winnipeg, Manitoba
- Skip: Jennifer Jones
- Third: Kaitlyn Lawes
- Second: Jocelyn Peterman
- Lead: Dawn McEwen
- Finalist: (Manitoba) Kerri Einarson

The 2018 Home Hardware Canada Cup was held December 5–9 at Affinity Place in Estevan, Saskatchewan. The tournament winners qualified for the 2021 Canadian Olympic Curling Pre-Trials.

Both the men's and women's events have a total purse of $70,000 with the winners receiving $14,000 and the runners up winning $9,000.

== Men ==
=== Teams ===
A revised version of the World Curling Tour's Order of Merit ranking system, allowing the many new teams for the 2018–19 curling season to carry over points individual players earned on their former teams, as of May 1, 2018, was used to qualify the first six men's teams. Team Dunstone qualified as the top-ranking non-qualified team on the Canadian Team Ranking System as of November 11, 2018.

Skip	Third	Second	Lead	Locale
Brendan Bottcher	Darren Moulding	Brad Thiessen	Karrick Martin	Saville Community Sports Centre, Edmonton, Alberta
Mike McEwen	Reid Carruthers	Derek Samagalski	Colin Hodgson	West St. Paul Curling Club, West St. Paul, Manitoba
Matt Dunstone	Braeden Moskowy	Catlin Schneider	Dustin Kidby	Highland Curling Club, Regina, Saskatchewan
John Epping	Mat Camm	Brent Laing	Craig Savill	Leaside Curling Club, East York, Toronto, Ontario
Brad Gushue	Mark Nichols	Brett Gallant	Geoff Walker	(Newfoundland and Labrador) Bally Haly Golf & Curling Club & RE/MAX Centre, St. John's
Brad Jacobs	Marc Kennedy	E. J. Harnden	Ryan Harnden	Community First Curling Centre, Sault Ste. Marie, Ontario
Kevin Koe	B. J. Neufeld	Colton Flasch	Ben Hebert	The Glencoe Club, Calgary, Alberta

=== Round-robin standings ===
Final round-robin standings

Key
Teams to Playoffs
Teams to Tiebreaker

Skip	W	L	PF	PA	EW	EL	BE	SE	S%
(Ontario) Brad Jacobs	5	1	42	30	27	22	3	9	87%
(Newfoundland and Labrador) Brad Gushue	4	2	45	33	26	23	2	7	86%
(Alberta) Kevin Koe	4	2	42	37	21	20	5	3	86%
(Alberta) Brendan Bottcher	4	2	41	42	23	19	4	6	82%
(Ontario) John Epping	3	3	34	35	23	23	5	4	83%
(Saskatchewan) Matt Dunstone	1	5	32	41	17	24	4	2	83%
(Manitoba) Reid Carruthers	0	6	21	39	15	20	6	4	81%

=== Round-robin results ===
==== Draw 1 ====
Wednesday, December 5, 9:00 am

Sheet A	1	2	3	4	5	6	7	8	9	10	Final
(Ontario) John Epping 🔨	2	0	0	2	1	0	0	1	0	1	7
(Alberta) Brendan Bottcher	0	2	0	0	0	1	1	0	1	0	5

Sheet B	1	2	3	4	5	6	7	8	9	10	Final
(Ontario) Brad Jacobs	0	2	0	0	2	0	2	0	3	X	9
(Alberta) Kevin Koe 🔨	1	0	1	0	0	2	0	1	0	X	5

Sheet E	1	2	3	4	5	6	7	8	9	10	Final
(Newfoundland and Labrador) Brad Gushue	1	0	1	0	0	2	0	1	1	1	7
(Saskatchewan) Matt Dunstone 🔨	0	1	0	0	2	0	1	0	0	0	4

==== Draw 2 ====
Wednesday, December 5, 2:00 pm

Sheet A	1	2	3	4	5	6	7	8	9	10	Final
(Ontario) Brad Jacobs	1	0	1	0	2	0	3	0	1	X	8
(Newfoundland and Labrador) Brad Gushue 🔨	0	0	0	2	0	1	0	1	0	X	4

Sheet B	1	2	3	4	5	6	7	8	9	10	Final
(Ontario) John Epping	0	0	0	1	1	2	0	0	2	X	6
(Manitoba) Reid Carruthers 🔨	1	0	1	0	0	0	1	0	0	X	3

==== Draw 3 ====
Wednesday, December 5, 7:00 pm

Sheet C	1	2	3	4	5	6	7	8	9	10	Final
(Manitoba) Reid Carruthers 🔨	0	0	2	0	2	0	0	1	X	X	5
(Alberta) Brendan Bottcher	1	0	0	2	0	4	2	0	X	X	9

Sheet D	1	2	3	4	5	6	7	8	9	10	Final
(Alberta) Kevin Koe	0	0	2	0	3	0	2	1	0	1	9
(Saskatchewan) Matt Dunstone 🔨	2	1	0	1	0	1	0	0	1	0	6

==== Draw 4 ====
Thursday, December 6, 9:00 am

Sheet C	1	2	3	4	5	6	7	8	9	10	Final
(Newfoundland and Labrador) Brad Gushue 🔨	1	0	0	5	1	0	X	X	X	X	7
(Ontario) John Epping	0	0	1	0	0	1	X	X	X	X	2

Sheet E	1	2	3	4	5	6	7	8	9	10	Final
(Manitoba) Reid Carruthers	1	1	0	0	0	0	0	0	2	0	4
(Ontario) Brad Jacobs 🔨	0	0	1	0	1	1	0	1	0	1	5

==== Draw 5 ====
Thursday, December 6, 2:00 pm

Sheet C	1	2	3	4	5	6	7	8	9	10	Final
(Saskatchewan) Matt Dunstone 🔨	0	0	1	1	0	2	0	0	0	X	4
(Ontario) Brad Jacobs	0	1	0	0	2	0	2	0	2	X	7

Sheet D	1	2	3	4	5	6	7	8	9	10	Final
(Alberta) Brendan Bottcher 🔨	2	0	2	0	2	0	0	2	0	1	9
(Newfoundland and Labrador) Brad Gushue	0	1	0	2	0	2	1	0	2	0	8

Sheet E	1	2	3	4	5	6	7	8	9	10	Final
(Alberta) Kevin Koe 🔨	3	0	0	2	0	1	0	1	0	1	8
(Ontario) John Epping	0	1	0	0	1	0	2	0	2	0	6

==== Draw 6 ====
Thursday, December 6, 7:00 pm

Sheet A	1	2	3	4	5	6	7	8	9	10	Final
(Manitoba) Reid Carruthers	0	0	0	0	0	0	1	0	0	1	2
(Alberta) Kevin Koe 🔨	0	0	0	1	0	0	0	2	1	0	4

Sheet B	1	2	3	4	5	6	7	8	9	10	Final
(Saskatchewan) Matt Dunstone	0	0	0	2	0	0	2	0	2	0	6
(Alberta) Brendan Bottcher 🔨	0	0	2	0	2	1	0	2	0	1	8

==== Draw 7 ====
Friday, December 7, 9:00 am

Sheet C	1	2	3	4	5	6	7	8	9	10	Final
(Alberta) Brendan Bottcher	0	1	0	1	0	0	0	1	X	X	3
(Alberta) Kevin Koe 🔨	2	0	4	0	4	0	0	0	X	X	10

Sheet D	1	2	3	4	5	6	7	8	9	10	Final
(Saskatchewan) Matt Dunstone 🔨	2	0	2	0	2	0	0	1	X	X	7
(Manitoba) Reid Carruthers	0	1	0	1	0	0	1	0	X	X	3

==== Draw 8 ====
Friday, December 7, 2:00 pm

Sheet A	1	2	3	4	5	6	7	8	9	10	Final
(Newfoundland and Labrador) Brad Gushue	0	2	1	0	3	0	0	0	2	X	8
(Manitoba) Reid Carruthers 🔨	1	0	0	1	0	1	0	1	0	X	4

Sheet D	1	2	3	4	5	6	7	8	9	10	Final
(Ontario) John Epping 🔨	2	0	0	1	0	1	0	2	0	0	6
(Ontario) Brad Jacobs	0	1	2	0	1	0	1	0	0	2	7

==== Draw 9 ====
Friday, December 7, 7:00 pm

Sheet A	1	2	3	4	5	6	7	8	9	10	Final
(Ontario) John Epping	0	0	2	0	2	0	1	0	2	X	7
(Saskatchewan) Matt Dunstone 🔨	2	0	0	1	0	0	0	2	0	X	5

Sheet B	1	2	3	4	5	6	7	8	9	10	Final
(Alberta) Kevin Koe	1	0	2	0	2	0	0	1	0	X	6
(Newfoundland and Labrador) Brad Gushue 🔨	0	4	0	2	0	2	1	0	2	X	11

Sheet E	1	2	3	4	5	6	7	8	9	10	Final
(Ontario) Brad Jacobs 🔨	0	0	0	3	0	1	0	1	1	0	6
(Alberta) Brendan Bottcher	0	1	1	0	2	0	1	0	0	2	7

=== Tiebreaker ===
Saturday, December 8, 9:00 am

Sheet B	1	2	3	4	5	6	7	8	9	10	Final
(Alberta) Kevin Koe 🔨	0	0	1	0	3	0	2	0	0	2	8
(Alberta) Brendan Bottcher	0	1	0	2	0	1	0	3	0	0	7

Player percentages
(Alberta) Team Koe		(Alberta) Team Bottcher	
Ben Hebert	93%	Karrick Martin	95%
Colton Flasch	100%	Brad Thiessen	91%
B.J. Neufeld	86%	Darren Moulding	90%
Kevin Koe	76%	Brendan Bottcher	88%
Total	89%	Total	91%

=== Playoffs ===
Semifinal			Final
			1	(Ontario) Brad Jacobs	5
2	(Newfoundland and Labrador) Brad Gushue	5	3	(Alberta) Kevin Koe	4
3	(Alberta) Kevin Koe	7

==== Semifinal ====
Saturday, December 8, 2:00 pm

Sheet C	1	2	3	4	5	6	7	8	9	10	Final
(Newfoundland and Labrador) Brad Gushue 🔨	0	2	0	0	2	1	0	0	0	0	5
(Alberta) Kevin Koe	0	0	1	0	0	0	2	2	1	1	7

Player percentages
(Newfoundland and Labrador) Team Gushue		(Alberta) Team Koe	
Geoff Walker	86%	Ben Hebert	98%
Brett Gallant	83%	Colton Flasch	91%
Mark Nichols	84%	B.J. Neufeld	93%
Brad Gushue	81%	Kevin Koe	78%
Total	83%	Total	90%

==== Final ====
Sunday, December 9, 7:00 pm

Sheet C	1	2	3	4	5	6	7	8	9	10	Final
(Ontario) Brad Jacobs 🔨	2	0	0	1	0	0	1	0	0	1	5
(Alberta) Kevin Koe	0	0	1	0	1	0	0	1	1	0	4

Player percentages
(Ontario) Team Jacobs		(Alberta) Team Koe	
Ryan Harnden	94%	Ben Hebert	94%
E. J. Harnden	91%	Colton Flasch	86%
Marc Kennedy	95%	B. J. Neufeld	84%
Brad Jacobs	80%	Kevin Koe	78%
Total	90%	Total	85%

=== Player percentages ===
After Round Robin Play; Includes games played at other positions

Leads	%	Seconds	%	Thirds/Skips	%	Fourths/Skips	%
Karrick Martin	88%	Brad Thiessen	82%	Darren Moulding	82%	Brendan Bottcher	82%
Colin Hodgson	90%	Derek Samagalski	81%	Reid Carruthers	78%	Mike McEwen	77%
Dustin Kidby	91%	Catlin Schneider	80%	Braeden Moskowy	80%	Matt Dunstone	79%
Craig Savill	85%	Brent Laing	84%	Mathew Camm	81%	John Epping	83%
Geoff Walker	90%	Brett Gallant	82%	Mark Nichols	87%	Brad Gushue	84%
Ryan Harnden	88%	E. J. Harnden	90%	Marc Kennedy	85%	Brad Jacobs	85%
Ben Hebert	90%	Colton Flasch	88%	B. J. Neufeld	88%	Kevin Koe	82%

== Women ==
=== Teams ===
A revised version of the World Curling Tour's Order of Merit ranking system, allowing the many new teams for the 2018–19 curling season to carry over points individual players earned on their former teams, as of May 1, 2018, was used to qualify the first six teams. However, due to a virtual tie, a seventh women's teams was invited using this method. Team Flaxey qualified as the top-ranking non-qualified team on the Canadian Team Ranking System as of November 11, 2018. Team Tracy Fleury had qualified for the event, but had to decline as they were representing Canada at the Second Leg of the 2018–19 Curling World Cup.

Skip	Third	Second	Lead	Locale
Chelsea Carey	Sarah Wilkes	Dana Ferguson	Rachelle Brown	The Glencoe Club, Calgary, Alberta
Kerri Einarson	Val Sweeting	Shannon Birchard	Briane Meilleur	Gimli Curling Club, Gimli, Manitoba
Allison Flaxey	Kate Cameron	Taylor McDonald	Raunora Westcott	Granite Curling Club, Winnipeg, Manitoba
Rachel Homan	Emma Miskew	Joanne Courtney	Lisa Weagle	Ottawa Curling Club, Ottawa, Ontario
Jennifer Jones	Kaitlyn Lawes	Jocelyn Peterman	Dawn McEwen	St. Vital Curling Club, Winnipeg, Manitoba
Darcy Robertson	Karen Klein	Vanessa Foster	Theresa Cannon	Assiniboine Memorial Curling Club, Winnipeg, Manitoba
Casey Scheidegger	Cary-Anne McTaggart	Jessie Scheidegger	Kristie Moore	Lethbridge Curling Club, Lethbridge, Alberta
Laura Walker	Cathy Overton-Clapham	Lori Olson-Johns	Laine Peters	Saville Community Sports Centre, Edmonton, Alberta

=== Round-robin standings ===
Final round-robin standings

Key
Teams to Playoffs
Teams to Tiebreaker

Skip	W	L	PF	PA	EW	EL	BE	SE	S%
(Manitoba) Kerri Einarson	6	1	49	35	32	28	4	9	82%
(Manitoba) Jennifer Jones	5	2	49	40	28	30	2	4	79%
(Ontario) Rachel Homan	5	2	45	36	32	27	4	11	82%
(Alberta) Casey Scheidegger	4	3	50	41	33	27	4	7	79%
(Alberta) Laura Walker	3	4	40	46	30	30	5	6	79%
(Alberta) Chelsea Carey	2	5	38	54	26	33	2	6	77%
(Manitoba) Allison Flaxey	2	5	36	49	25	29	6	7	79%
(Manitoba) Darcy Robertson	1	6	49	55	31	33	2	6	77%

=== Round-robin results ===
==== Draw 1 ====
Wednesday, December 5, 9:00 am

Sheet C	1	2	3	4	5	6	7	8	9	10	Final
(Alberta) Chelsea Carey	0	2	0	0	1	0	3	0	0	X	6
(Manitoba) Darcy Robertson 🔨	2	0	3	1	0	2	0	1	2	X	11

Sheet D	1	2	3	4	5	6	7	8	9	10	Final
(Alberta) Laura Walker 🔨	0	1	0	0	1	0	1	0	1	1	5
(Manitoba) Allison Flaxey	0	0	2	1	0	2	0	1	0	0	6

==== Draw 2 ====
Wednesday, December 5, 2:00 pm

Sheet C	1	2	3	4	5	6	7	8	9	10	Final
(Alberta) Casey Scheidegger 🔨	0	0	1	0	1	0	1	0	3	X	6
(Alberta) Laura Walker	0	1	0	0	0	1	0	1	0	X	3

Sheet D	1	2	3	4	5	6	7	8	9	10	11	Final
(Manitoba) Kerri Einarson 🔨	0	0	1	2	0	0	0	1	0	1	0	5
(Ontario) Rachel Homan	1	1	0	0	1	1	1	0	0	0	1	6

Sheet E	1	2	3	4	5	6	7	8	9	10	11	Final
(Manitoba) Jennifer Jones 🔨	1	0	0	0	1	0	0	3	0	0	2	7
(Alberta) Chelsea Carey	0	0	0	1	0	1	1	0	1	1	0	5

==== Draw 3 ====
Wednesday, December 5, 7:00 pm

Sheet A	1	2	3	4	5	6	7	8	9	10	Final
(Manitoba) Jennifer Jones 🔨	3	1	0	1	0	0	1	0	3	X	9
(Manitoba) Darcy Robertson	0	0	2	0	0	3	0	2	0	X	7

Sheet B	1	2	3	4	5	6	7	8	9	10	Final
(Ontario) Rachel Homan 🔨	1	1	1	0	1	0	1	0	0	0	5
(Alberta) Casey Scheidegger	0	0	0	2	0	1	0	1	2	1	7

Sheet E	1	2	3	4	5	6	7	8	9	10	Final
(Manitoba) Kerri Einarson 🔨	2	0	0	0	2	2	0	1	0	X	7
(Manitoba) Allison Flaxey	0	2	1	2	0	0	0	0	1	X	6

==== Draw 4 ====
Thursday, December 6, 9:00 am

Sheet A	1	2	3	4	5	6	7	8	9	10	Final
(Ontario) Rachel Homan 🔨	0	0	3	0	2	2	0	1	X	X	8
(Alberta) Laura Walker	0	1	0	1	0	0	1	0	X	X	3

Sheet B	1	2	3	4	5	6	7	8	9	10	Final
(Manitoba) Kerri Einarson 🔨	1	0	0	0	1	1	1	1	0	1	6
(Manitoba) Jennifer Jones	0	0	1	0	0	0	0	0	2	0	3

Sheet D	1	2	3	4	5	6	7	8	9	10	Final
(Alberta) Casey Scheidegger 🔨	1	0	1	0	1	0	1	1	0	1	6
(Alberta) Chelsea Carey	0	1	0	2	0	2	0	0	2	0	7

==== Draw 5 ====
Thursday, December 6, 2:00 pm

Sheet A	1	2	3	4	5	6	7	8	9	10	Final
(Manitoba) Allison Flaxey 🔨	0	0	0	2	0	0	2	1	0	X	5
(Alberta) Chelsea Carey	0	1	0	0	2	2	0	0	2	X	7

Sheet B	1	2	3	4	5	6	7	8	9	10	Final
(Manitoba) Darcy Robertson	0	0	0	2	1	0	1	0	1	0	5
(Alberta) Laura Walker 🔨	0	0	2	0	0	1	0	1	0	4	8

==== Draw 6 ====
Thursday, December 6, 7:00 pm

Sheet C	1	2	3	4	5	6	7	8	9	10	Final
(Manitoba) Darcy Robertson	0	2	0	1	0	0	2	1	1	0	7
(Manitoba) Kerri Einarson 🔨	1	0	1	0	2	1	0	0	0	3	8

Sheet D	1	2	3	4	5	6	7	8	9	10	Final
(Ontario) Rachel Homan	1	0	0	1	0	2	0	1	X	X	5
(Manitoba) Jennifer Jones 🔨	0	2	3	0	3	0	1	0	X	X	9

Sheet E	1	2	3	4	5	6	7	8	9	10	Final
(Manitoba) Allison Flaxey	0	0	1	0	0	1	0	0	X	X	2
(Alberta) Casey Scheidegger 🔨	3	2	0	0	4	0	0	3	X	X	12

==== Draw 7 ====
Friday, December 7, 9:00 am

Sheet A	1	2	3	4	5	6	7	8	9	10	Final
(Manitoba) Kerri Einarson 🔨	2	0	1	0	2	0	0	0	3	X	8
(Alberta) Casey Scheidegger	0	2	0	1	0	1	0	1	0	X	5

Sheet B	1	2	3	4	5	6	7	8	9	10	Final
(Manitoba) Jennifer Jones 🔨	0	2	0	1	0	2	0	2	0	X	7
(Manitoba) Allison Flaxey	1	0	1	0	0	0	2	0	0	X	4

Sheet E	1	2	3	4	5	6	7	8	9	10	Final
(Manitoba) Darcy Robertson	0	2	0	1	0	1	1	0	1	0	6
(Ontario) Rachel Homan 🔨	1	0	1	0	1	0	0	3	0	1	7

==== Draw 8 ====
Friday, December 7, 2:00 pm

Sheet B	1	2	3	4	5	6	7	8	9	10	Final
(Alberta) Chelsea Carey	0	1	0	0	0	1	0	X	X	X	2
(Ontario) Rachel Homan 🔨	0	0	2	1	1	0	5	X	X	X	9

Sheet C	1	2	3	4	5	6	7	8	9	10	Final
(Manitoba) Jennifer Jones	1	0	2	0	1	0	1	0	4	X	9
(Alberta) Casey Scheidegger 🔨	0	1	0	2	0	1	0	2	0	X	6

Sheet E	1	2	3	4	5	6	7	8	9	10	Final
(Alberta) Laura Walker 🔨	1	0	0	2	0	1	0	1	0	0	5
(Manitoba) Kerri Einarson	0	1	0	0	1	0	4	0	1	1	8

==== Draw 9 ====
Friday, December 7, 7:00 pm

Sheet C	1	2	3	4	5	6	7	8	9	10	11	Final
(Alberta) Laura Walker	0	0	1	1	0	1	1	0	4	0	1	9
(Alberta) Chelsea Carey 🔨	2	1	0	0	1	0	0	1	0	3	0	8

Sheet D	1	2	3	4	5	6	7	8	9	10	Final
(Manitoba) Allison Flaxey 🔨	1	0	1	0	0	2	0	3	0	2	9
(Manitoba) Darcy Robertson	0	2	0	0	1	0	1	0	2	0	6

==== Draw 10 ====
Saturday, December 8, 9:00 am

Sheet A	1	2	3	4	5	6	7	8	9	10	Final
(Alberta) Laura Walker	0	0	1	0	2	0	2	0	1	1	7
(Manitoba) Jennifer Jones 🔨	0	1	0	2	0	1	0	1	0	0	5

Sheet B	1	2	3	4	5	6	7	8	9	10	Final
(Alberta) Casey Scheidegger 🔨	1	0	2	0	1	0	2	1	0	1	8
(Manitoba) Darcy Robertson	0	1	0	2	0	2	0	0	2	0	7

Sheet C	1	2	3	4	5	6	7	8	9	10	Final
(Manitoba) Allison Flaxey	0	0	1	1	0	0	0	1	1	0	4
(Ontario) Rachel Homan 🔨	0	1	0	0	2	1	0	0	0	1	5

Sheet D	1	2	3	4	5	6	7	8	9	10	Final
(Alberta) Chelsea Carey	0	0	1	0	1	0	0	1	0	X	3
(Manitoba) Kerri Einarson 🔨	0	3	0	1	0	0	1	0	2	X	7

=== Playoffs ===
Semifinal			Final
			1	(Manitoba) Kerri Einarson	5
2	(Manitoba) Jennifer Jones	8	2	(Manitoba) Jennifer Jones	8
3	(Ontario) Rachel Homan	4

==== Semifinal ====
Saturday, December 8, 8:00 pm

Sheet C	1	2	3	4	5	6	7	8	9	10	Final
(Manitoba) Jennifer Jones 🔨	1	0	0	3	1	0	2	0	1	X	8
(Ontario) Rachel Homan	0	0	1	0	0	1	0	2	0	X	4

Player percentages
(Manitoba) Team Jones		(Ontario) Team Homan	
Dawn McEwen	88%	Lisa Weagle	81%
Jocelyn Peterman	88%	Joanne Courtney	83%
Kaitlyn Lawes	88%	Emma Miskew	79%
Jennifer Jones	88%	Rachel Homan	68%
Total	88%	Total	78%

==== Final ====
Sunday, December 9, 2:00 pm

Sheet C	1	2	3	4	5	6	7	8	9	10	Final
(Manitoba) Kerri Einarson 🔨	1	0	0	2	0	0	1	1	0	X	5
(Manitoba) Jennifer Jones	0	2	0	0	2	1	0	0	3	X	8

Player percentages
(Manitoba) Team Einarson		(Manitoba) Team Jones	
Briane Meilleur	91%	Dawn McEwen	81%
Shannon Birchard	95%	Jocelyn Peterman	84%
Val Sweeting	78%	Kaitlyn Lawes	81%
Kerri Einarson	70%	Jennifer Jones	86%
Total	84%	Total	83%

=== Player percentages ===
After Round Robin

Leads	%	Seconds	%	Thirds	%	Skips	%
Rachelle Brown	81%	Dana Ferguson	78%	Sarah Wilkes	75%	Chelsea Carey	73%
Briane Meilleur	88%	Shannon Birchard	81%	Val Sweeting	83%	Kerri Einarson	75%
Raunora Westcott	85%	Taylor McDonald	80%	Kate Cameron	78%	Allison Flaxey	72%
Lisa Weagle	84%	Joanne Courtney	82%	Emma Miskew	82%	Rachel Homan	77%
Dawn McEwen	83%	Jocelyn Peterman	82%	Kaitlyn Lawes	81%	Jennifer Jones	75%
Theresa Cannon	78%	Vanessa Foster	78%	Karen Klein	74%	Darcy Robertson	78%
Kristie Moore	83%	Jessie Haughian	80%	Cary-Anne McTaggart	76%	Casey Scheidegger	76%
Laine Peters	85%	Lori Olson-Johns	80%	Cathy Overton-Clapham	76%	Laura Walker	73%
