= Kaitlyn Lawes =

Canadian curler (born 1988)

- Curler
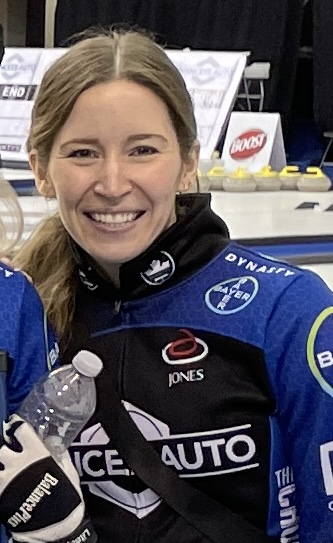
- Lawes at the 2022 Players' Championship
- Born: Lesley Kaitlyn Lawes; December 16, 1988 (age 37); Winnipeg, Manitoba, Canada
- Height: 160 cm (5 ft 3 in)

Team
- Curling club: Fort Rouge CC; Winnipeg, MB

Curling career
- Member Association: Manitoba
- Hearts: 12 (2011, 2012, 2013, 2015, 2016, 2019, 2020, 2021, 2023, 2024, 2025, 2026)
- World Championship: 2 (2015, 2018)
- Olympic: 3 (2014, 2018, 2022)
- Top CTRS ranking: 1st (2010–11, 2011–12, 2013–14, 2014–15, 2017–18)
- Grand Slam victories: 10 (2010 Sobeys Slam, 2011 Players', 2013 Manitoba Liquor & Lotteries, 2013 Colonial Square, 2014 Players', 2014 Autumn Gold, 2016 Champions Cup, 2017 Players', 2017 Masters, 2017 National)
Medal record
Women's curling
Representing Canada
Winter Olympics
Gold medal – first place	2014 Sochi	Women's
Gold medal – first place	2018 Pyeongchang	Mixed doubles
World Championships
Gold medal – first place	2018 North Bay	Women's
Silver medal – second place	2015 Sapporo	Women's
World Junior Curling Championships
Silver medal – second place	2009 Vancouver	Women's
Bronze medal – third place	2008 Östersund	Women's
Representing Manitoba
Canadian Olympic Trials
Gold medal – first place	2013 Winnipeg	Women's
Gold medal – first place	2021 Saskatoon	Women's
Bronze medal – third place	2017 Ottawa	Women's
Canadian Mixed Doubles Olympic Trials
Gold medal – first place	2018 Portage la Prairie	Mixed doubles
Scotties Tournament of Hearts
Gold medal – first place	2015 Moose Jaw	Women's
Silver medal – second place	2011 Charlottetown	Women's
Silver medal – second place	2013 Kingston	Women's
Silver medal – second place	2026 Mississauga	Women's
Bronze medal – third place	2012 Red Deer	Women's
Bronze medal – third place	2016 Grand Prairie	Women's
Representing (Manitoba) Team Wild Card
Scotties Tournament of Hearts
Bronze medal – third place	2020 Moose Jaw	Women's

Lesley Kaitlyn Lawes (born December 16, 1988) is a Canadian curler. Lawes was the long time third for the Jennifer Jones team that represented Canada at the 2014 Winter Olympics where they won the gold medal. They were the first women's team to go through the Olympics undefeated and the first Manitoba based curling team to win at the Olympics. Lawes curled with John Morris in the mixed doubles event at the 2018 Winter Olympics where they won gold. This win made her and Morris the first Canadian curlers to win two Olympic gold medals, and Lawes was the first to win gold in two consecutive Olympics.

Lawes was a member of the world champion team as a third at the 2018 Ford World Women's Curling Championship, where the team went through the event undefeated. She also won a silver medal at the 2015 World Championships. Lawes was a winner of the 2015 Scotties Tournament of Hearts and has had three runner-up results at the Scotties in 2011, 2013 and 2026. Lawes is a two-time Canadian junior champion (2008, 2009) and went on to win a silver and bronze medal each at the World Junior Curling Championships.

In 2019, Lawes was named the seventh greatest Canadian curler in history in a TSN poll of broadcasters, reporters and top curlers.

== Curling career ==
=== Juniors ===
Lawes began curling at the age of four.

Lawes first came into the spotlight in 2008 when she won the Manitoba Junior women's championship with teammates Jenna Loder, Liz Peters and Sarah Wazney. With Lawes skipping the team, the rink represented Manitoba at the 2008 Canadian Junior Curling Championships, where she led her team to a 10–2 round robin record, in first place. In the finals, her team beat Saskatchewan's Stephanie McVicar rink, claiming the national championship. This qualified her team to represent Canada at the 2008 World Junior Curling Championships. There, she led Canada to a 5–4 round robin record, tied with Denmark's Madeleine Dupont team. She would go on to beat Denmark, but lose in the 3 vs. 4 playoff game against Russia's Liudmila Privivkova. This put her team into the bronze medal game, where she would face-off against Russia again. This time her rink got the best of the Russians, beating them 9–8, and taking home the bronze medal in the process.

2009 was another great season for the Lawes team. They once again won the Manitoba junior championship, with a new front-end of Laryssa Grenkow and Breanne Meakin replacing Peters and Wazney. At the 2009 Canadian Junior Curling Championships, Lawes led Manitoba to an 8–4 round robin record, in third place. In the playoffs, however, they downed Alberta's Casey Scheidegger rink and Ontario's Rachel Homan to defend their title and once again represented Canada at the World Juniors. At the 2009 World Junior Curling Championships, Lawes would lead Team Canada to a 6–3 round robin record, in third place. In the playoffs, she beat the Russians (skipped by Margarita Fomina) and Switzerland (skipped by Martina Baumann) before losing to Scotland's Eve Muirhead in the gold medal final, settling for silver. In addition to their great showing in junior competitions, the Lawes team also played well on the World Curling Tour, making the semi-finals in a Grand Slam event, the Casinos of Winnipeg Women's Curling Classic.

=== Early women's career (2009–2013) ===
After Juniors, Lawes teamed up to play third for Cathy King who was needing a third after Lori Olson left the team to play for Crystal Webster. In her one season with the King rink, Lawes would win the September Shoot-Out, and played in three Grand Slams, making it to the semifinals of the 2009 Trail Appliances Curling Classic. The team played in the 2010 Alberta Scotties Tournament of Hearts, where they would finish in third place.

Following the 2009–10 curling season, Team King decided to step back from the game for a while, leaving Lawes without a team to play for. Shortly after, it was announced that Team Jennifer Jones had dropped third Cathy Overton-Clapham, and had replaced her with Lawes, in time for the 2010–11 curling season. The team found immediate success in their first season together, winning two slams (the 2010 Sobeys Slam and the 2011 Players' Championship), as well as the Sun Life Classic, the Karuizawa International Curling Championship and the Victoria Curling Classic Invitational events on the World Curling Tour. As Jones had won the 2010 Scotties Tournament of Hearts, the team represented Team Canada at the 2011 Scotties Tournament of Hearts, Lawes' first women's national championship. There they would make it to the finals, where they lost to Saskatchewan's Amber Holland rink.

The Jones rink continued their success into the 2011–12 season, winning the Radisson Blu Oslo Cup and the 2011 Canada Cup of Curling. The team won the 2012 Manitoba Scotties Tournament of Hearts and represented Manitoba at the 2012 Scotties Tournament of Hearts. There, they would win the bronze medal.

For the first half of the 2012–13 season, Lawes skipped the team, with Kirsten Wall throwing third, as Jones was expecting her first child and sat out until January. Lawes won The Shoot-Out event on the World Curling Tour as skip. As skip, she would play in four slams, failing to qualify at the 2012 Curlers Corner Autumn Gold Curling Classic and the 2012 Masters, making it to the quarterfinals of the 2012 Manitoba Lotteries Women's Curling Classic and the round of 16 at the 2012 Colonial Square Ladies Classic. Lawes skipped the team at the 2012 Canada Cup of Curling, where she would lose in the final to Team Stefanie Lawton. Jones was back to skipping the team in time for the 2013 Manitoba Scotties Tournament of Hearts, which they again would win. At the 2013 Scotties Tournament of Hearts, Jones led Manitoba to another silver medal, this time losing to Ontario's Rachel Homan rink in the final.

=== Olympic and Scotties success (2013–2017) ===
The Jones team won the right to compete at the 2014 Winter Olympics when they won the 2013 Canadian Olympic Curling Trials. At the Olympics the team became the first women's team to not only go through the round robin undefeated but also the first team to go throughout the whole tournament undefeated when they won the Olympic gold. They were the first Manitoba based curling team to win gold at the Olympics. After the win Lawes noted her recently deceased father stating "I know he would be so proud. This is something he knew we had it in us. I don't know how to describe it. I thought about him a lot during the game ... I wish that I could share this experience with him, but he was my inspiration." In addition to their Olympic win, the team won three Grand Slams on the World Curling Tour, winning the 2013 Manitoba Liquor & Lotteries Women's Classic, the 2013 Colonial Square Ladies Classic and the 2014 Players' Championship.

Following the Olympics in Russia, Lawes as part of the Jones' team won the 2015 Manitoba Scotties Tournament of Hearts, and then won the 2015 Scotties Tournament of Hearts in Moose Jaw, Lawes' first national women's title. The team would represent Canada at the 2015 World Women's Curling Championship, where they made the final but lost to Alina Pätz of Switzerland 5–3, finishing in the silver medal position. On the tour, the team would win the 2014 Curlers Corner Autumn Gold Curling Classic, the Canad Inns Women's Classic and the Karuizawa International Curling Championship.

By virtue of winning the 2015 Scotties, the Jones rink would represent Team Canada at the 2016 Scotties Tournament of Hearts, where they would win a bronze medal. On the Tour that season, the team would only win the DeKalb Superspiel, and the season-ending Grand Slam event, the 2016 Humpty's Champions Cup.

The Jones rink would not qualify for the 2017 Scotties, having lost in the semifinals of the 2017 Manitoba Scotties Tournament of Hearts. However, they had some success in other events, winning the DeKalb Superspiel again, winning the 2016 Canada Cup of Curling and the 2017 Players' Championship.

=== 2018 mixed doubles Olympic champion and world champion ===
Lawes next tried to qualify for the 2018 Winter Olympics in Pyeongchang, Korea but the team did not succeed, watching the Rachel Homan rink win the honour. She would still have an opportunity to qualify for the Olympics as part of the debut mixed doubles curling event. John Morris was scheduled to curl with Homan in the trials, but she was unavailable having already qualified as Canada's women's representative. Morris then teamed up with Lawes; the pair only practiced once at the Granite Curling Club for 30 minutes prior to the 2018 Canadian Mixed Doubles Curling Olympic Trials. They would finish the round robin 5–3 but won through the playoff round to the final where they defeated Brad Gushue and Valerie Sweeting, winning the right to wear the maple leaf in Korea.

The team entered the Mixed Doubles competition against Norway, but lost their opening game. Lawes and Morris would go on to win their next six games, finishing with a 6–1 record. In the semifinals they faced Norway in a rematch, this time prevailing. In the gold medal final they routed the Swiss team 10–3, with the Swiss team conceding after six ends. Lawes thanked supporters from home for her gold medal win, telling CBC News: "Everyone in Winnipeg, thank you so much for your support, and St. Vital Curling Club for helping our families come to cheer us on. We felt that support so much over here." After her win a landmark 'Winnipeg' sign at The Forks was lit up in gold and red to celebrate her medal win. Lawes and Morris were Canada's first two-time Olympic champions in curling, and Lawes the first Canadian to win gold in curling in two consecutive Olympics.

Following her return from South Korea, Lawes joined the Jones team and took her spot at third back from Shannon Birchard who had played at this position in her absence. The team, victorious with Birchard at the 2018 Scotties Tournament of Hearts won the right to wear the maple leaf at the 2018 Ford World Women's Curling Championship taking place in North Bay, Ontario. The team played very well and went through the round-robin undefeated. They would eventually beat Jamie Sinclair and her American team in the semi-final earning the right to face the Olympic champion, Anna Hasselborg in the final. Lawes and the Jones team would have to take Hasselborg to an extra end, but ultimately won the game without having to throw their last rock. The victory was Lawes's first World Championship victory and would be the last for long-time second Jill Officer, as she announced she was stepping back from the game.

=== Jocelyn Peterman joins the team (2018–2022) ===
In the 2018-19 curling season, Jocelyn Peterman joined the Jones team at second, replacing Officer. Lawes and the team won the 2018 Canada Cup with an 8–5 victory over Kerri Einarson. The team also won the 2019 TSN All-Star Curling Skins Game, defeating Tracy Fleury to win $51,000. The team represented Team Canada at the 2019 Scotties Tournament of Hearts, missing playoffs with a 6–5 record. The team of Jones, Lawes, Shannon Birchard, and Officer was chosen to represent Team Canada at the Grand Final of the inaugural Curling World Cup, which they won, defeating Silvana Tirinzoni in the final. Lawes played in two mixed doubles events that season with Morris, the Canad Inns Mixed Doubles Championship, which they won, and the Qualico Mixed Doubles Classic, where they lost in the quarterfinal to Peterman and Brett Gallant. However, she was unable to compete in the 2019 Canadian Mixed Doubles Curling Championship after sustaining an injury at the Scotties.

In their first event of the 2019-20 season, Team Jones won the 2019 AMJ Campbell Shorty Jenkins Classic, defeating Tracy Fleury in the final. Next they played in the 2019 Colonial Square Ladies Classic where Fleury would take them out in the semi-finals. They had two quarterfinal finishes at the first two Slams of the season, the Masters and the Tour Challenge. At the Canada Cup, the team struggled, finishing with a 2–4 record. The team made the final at the Boost National, losing to Team Hasselborg, and the quarterfinals at the Canadian Open. The team made the final of the 2020 Manitoba Scotties Tournament of Hearts and lost to Team Einarson. By virtue of their CTRS ranking, the team had a second chance to qualify for the 2020 Scotties Tournament of Hearts through the wild card play-in game, where they defeated Team Fleury to become Team Wild Card. At the Scotties, they finished the round robin and championship pool with a 9–2 record as the second seed in playoffs, but lost to Kerri Einarson (Team Manitoba) in the 1 vs. 2 playoff game and to Rachel Homan (Team Ontario) in the semifinal to finish in third place. It would be their last event of the season as both the Players' Championship and the Champions Cup Grand Slam events were also cancelled due to the COVID-19 pandemic. On March 18, 2020, the team announced that Lisa Weagle, after parting ways with Team Homan, would join the team in a 5-player rotation.

The Jones rink won their lone event of the abbreviated 2020–21 season at the 2020 Stu Sells Oakville Tankard. The 2021 Manitoba Scotties were cancelled due to the COVID-19 pandemic in Manitoba, so Curl Manitoba appointed the Jones rink to represent Manitoba at the 2021 Scotties Tournament of Hearts. At the 2021 Hearts, the team finished with a 9–3 record, putting them in a third place tiebreaker match against Alberta, skipped by Laura Walker. Alberta defeated Manitoba 9–8 to advance to the semifinal. A month later, Lawes returned to the bubble to compete with her nephew Connor Lawes at the 2021 Canadian Mixed Doubles Curling Championship. The pair failed to make the playoffs, finishing pool play with a 1–5 record. Lawes ended her season with Team Jones at the only two Grand Slam events of the abbreviated season, also held in the Calgary bubble. The team missed the playoffs at both the 2021 Champions Cup and the 2021 Players' Championship.

Team Jones qualified for the playoffs in each of their first four tour events, however, were not able to qualify for any finals. At the first Grand Slam of the season, the 2021 Masters, the team was able to reach the final before losing to Tracy Fleury in a 9–7 match. They then missed the playoffs at the 2021 National two weeks later.

A month later, Team Jones competed in the 2021 Canadian Olympic Curling Trials. There, the team posted a 5–3 round robin record, earning a spot in the semifinal. They then defeated Krista McCarville to qualify for the final where they would once again face Fleury. After a tight game all the way through, Team Fleury stole one in the ninth end to take a single point lead. In the tenth end, Jones had an open hit-and-stick to win the game, however, her shooter rolled two far and she only got one. This sent the game to an extra end. On her final shot, Fleury attempted a soft-weight hit on a Jones stone partially buried behind a guard. Her rock, however, curled too much and hit the guard, giving up a steal of one and the game to Team Jones. After the game, Jones said that "We're there to pick each other up when you miss, not everybody can say that and that's really a big strength of our team." With the win, Team Jones travelled to Beijing, China to represent Canada at the 2022 Winter Olympics. Through the round robin, the Canadian team had mixed results, ultimately finishing tied for third with a 5–4 record. However, because of their draw shot challenge results, which were the lowest of the teams they were tied with, they ranked fifth overall, missing the playoffs. After their final game, an emotional Lawes said that "It's difficult when it's out of our control. I'm really proud of this team. We worked really hard this week and we have a lot to be proud of. At the end of the day we tried our best and that's all we could do."

On March 15, 2022, Team Jones announced that they would be parting ways at the conclusion of the 2021–22 season. Lawes and second Jocelyn Peterman then announced they would be joining Selena Njegovan and Kristin MacCuish of Team Fleury to form a new team for the 2022–23 season. Lawes would skip the team, with Njegovan playing third, Peterman at second and MacCuish at lead.

Team Jones still had two more events together before parting ways, the 2022 Players' Championship and 2022 Champions Cup Grand Slams. At the Players', the team went 1–3, missing the playoffs. They then missed the playoffs again at the Champions Cup with a 1–4 record, ending the team's run together.

=== Team Lawes (2022–present) ===
The new Lawes rink began the 2022–23 season with a second-place finish at the 2022 Oslo Cup. After going undefeated in the round robin, they beat Marianne Rørvik in the semifinal before losing 5–3 to Anna Hasselborg in the final. They were able to pick up their first tour victory at the Mother Club Fall Curling Classic, winning 6–2 in the final over Sarah Anderson. At the 2022 PointsBet Invitational, Team Lawes lost in the semifinal to Team Scheidegger. In the first Slam of the season, the 2022 National, the team advanced to the semifinals where they were stopped by Silvana Tirinzoni 7–5. They also qualified for the playoffs at the 2022 Tour Challenge where they lost in the quarterfinals to Rachel Homan. Following a quarterfinal finish at the 2022 Curlers Corner Autumn Gold Curling Classic, Lawes went on maternity leave. During that time, Selena Njegovan took over skipping the team, leading them to a victory at the 2022 Stu Sells 1824 Halifax Classic and a quarterfinal finish at the 2022 Masters. Lawes returned for the 2023 Canadian Open where the team missed the playoffs with a 2–3 record. At the 2023 Manitoba Scotties Tournament of Hearts, the team was eliminated in the semifinal after losing 8–5 to Abby Ackland. Despite this, they still qualified for the 2023 Scotties Tournament of Hearts as a Wild Card team. After a 5–3 record, they lost in a tiebreaker to Nova Scotia, skipped by Christina Black. The team finished the season at the 2023 Players' Championship and the 2023 Champions Cup, missing the playoffs at both.

Back together for the 2023–24 season, Team Lawes had promising results to begin the season. In October, they had two straight semifinal finishes at the 2023 PointsBet Invitational and the 2023 Players Open, losing out to Kerri Einarson and Anna Hasselborg respectively. At the first Slam of the season, the 2023 Tour Challenge, the team began with two straight losses before rallying together four straight victories to reach their first Grand Slam final as a unit. There, they lost 7–4 to Team Jones. They would miss the playoffs at the other four Slams that season, however. In November, they made the semifinals at the Red Deer Curling Classic where they fell 5–3 to Team Homan. They followed this up with a third-place finish at the 2023 Karuizawa International Curling Championships in Japan. Entering the 2024 Manitoba Scotties Tournament of Hearts as the top seeded team, Team Lawes lost just one game en route to claiming the provincial title, defeating Beth Peterson 9–8 in the championship game. This qualified them for the 2024 Scotties Tournament of Hearts where they did not a good start, losing three of their first four games. Sitting 3–4 heading into their last round robin game, they were able to beat Northern Ontario's Krista McCarville 6–5. This created a five-way tie for third with Northern Ontario, British Columbia, Quebec, and Saskatchewan. With tiebreaker games abolished and the first tiebreaker (which was head-to-head between all tied teams) tied as well at 2–2, cumulative last stone draw distance between all the teams was used to decide who would make the playoffs. The Lawes rink finished first with a 231.6 and thus earned a spot in the playoffs. Facing Alberta's Selena Sturmay in the 3 vs. 4 page qualifier, the team lost 8–5 and were eliminated. They finished their season with a 1–4 record at the 2024 Players' Championship.

The 2024–25 season saw Team Lawes have their least successful year of the quad as after starting strong, they ended up falling out of qualification for Grand Slam events. To begin, however, the team reached three straight semifinals at the 2024 Saville Shootout, 2024 PointsBet Invitational and the 2024 Tour Challenge, losing to Team Homan at the latter two. Lawes then went on maternity leave and Njegovan again took over the team as skip. During this time, the team played in three events and only qualified at one of them, losing in the semifinals of the Saville Grand Prix to Kerri Einarson. With Lawes back in the lineup, the team missed three more consecutive playoffs, losing in a tiebreaker at the 2025 Masters to Satsuki Fujisawa. Having pre-qualified for the 2025 Scotties Tournament of Hearts due to their CTRS ranking from the 2023–24 season, Team Lawes lost three of their first four games to start the event 1–3. They then decided to make a change with Njegovan taking over skipping duties while Lawes remained throwing fourth stones. This move proved successful as the team won their next three games to remain in contention. Facing Team Einarson in their final round robin game, Team Lawes lost 9–6 and were eliminated from the event at 4–4. They ended the season ranked 19th, just outside of Grand Slam qualification.

Looking to turn things around for the final year of the Olympic quadrennial, the Lawes rink had a strong start to the season by winning their second event, the Saville Grand Prix. In the playoffs, they beat Kate Cameron in the quarterfinals before knocking off Korea's Gim Eun-ji and Park You-been in the semifinals and final respectively. They then played in the Tier 2 side of the 2025 Masters where they lost in the quarterfinals to Madeleine Dupont. In their next three events, Team Lawes struggled to find consistency, missing the playoffs at all three. This led them into the 2025 Canadian Olympic Curling Trials, which they directly qualified for through CTRS points. There, the team continued to see mixed results, finishing the round robin at 4–3. This tied them for third place, however, they missed out on the playoffs due to a poor Draw Shot Challenge (last stone draw). To wrap up 2025, the team had a strong run at the 2025 Canadian Open Tier 2, advancing to the finals where they were defeated by Taylor Reese-Hansen. In the new year, the team continued the season at the 2026 RME Women of the Rings Manitoba women's provincial. After a previously undefeated 7–0 record, Team Lawes fell 9–7 in the final game to Beth Peterson after Lawes' final shot for the win wrecked on a guard. However, due to Rachel Homan having to withdraw from the 2026 Scotties Tournament of Hearts as the Scotties schedule conflicted with the Olympics, an additional spot was instead given to Lawes as the highest CTRS ranked non-qualified team following the completion of all provincial and territorial championships. For the event, Laura Walker played second for the team, replacing Jocelyn Peterman who was competing in the mixed doubles tournament at the Olympics. At the Hearts, Team Lawes made the most of their second chance, going undefeated with an 8–0 record in the round robin and beating Christina Black and Kerri Einarson in playoff matchups to qualify for the Scotties final. However, similarly to their record at the 2026 Manitoba championships where they went undefeated throughout the championship but lost in the final, Team Lawes would lose in a rematch against Einarson 4–3 in the Scotties final, finishing with a silver medal.

On March 26, 2026, Team Lawes announced their disbandment with Lawes stepping back from competitive play for the 2026–27 season.

== Personal life ==
Lawes attended the University of Manitoba where she studied nutrition, and attended Athabasca University where she studied communications. She is in engaged to Stephan Vigier, a professional ice hockey player, and has two children. She is currently employed as a farmer, and lives in Notre Dame de Lourdes, Manitoba. Her father Keith was also a competitive curler, having played for Newfoundland at the 1969 Macdonald Brier. Her mother is Cheryl Lawes and her brother is Kevin Lawes. She also has three half-siblings; Chris, David and Andrea, who was a member of the 1990 Scott Tournament of Hearts champion team, representing Ontario. Her nephew is curler Connor Lawes.

== Grand Slam record ==
Key
C	Champion
F	Lost in Final
SF	Lost in Semifinal
QF	Lost in Quarterfinals
R16	Lost in the round of 16
Q	Did not advance to playoffs
T2	Played in Tier 2 event
DNP	Did not participate in event
N/A	Not a Grand Slam event that season

Event	2009–10	2010–11	2011–12	2012–13	2013–14	2014–15	2015–16	2016–17	2017–18	2018–19	2019–20	2020–21	2021–22	2022–23	2023–24	2024–25	2025–26
Masters	N/A	N/A	N/A	Q	SF	SF	QF	QF	C	QF	QF	N/A	F	DNP	Q	Q	T2
Tour Challenge	N/A	N/A	N/A	N/A	N/A	N/A	Q	QF	SF	QF	QF	N/A	N/A	QF	F	SF	Q
The National	N/A	N/A	N/A	N/A	N/A	N/A	QF	Q	C	SF	F	N/A	Q	SF	Q	Q	Q
Canadian Open	N/A	N/A	N/A	N/A	N/A	QF	F	QF	SF	Q	QF	N/A	N/A	Q	Q	DNP	T2
Players'	Q	C	SF	SF	C	Q	F	C	F	QF	N/A	Q	Q	Q	Q	DNP	DNP
Champions Cup	N/A	N/A	N/A	N/A	N/A	N/A	C	QF	SF	QF	N/A	Q	Q	Q	N/A	N/A	N/A

=== Former events ===
Event	2008–09	2009–10	2010–11	2011–12	2012–13	2013–14	2014–15	2015–16	2016–17	2017–18	2018–19
Elite 10	N/A	N/A	N/A	N/A	N/A	N/A	N/A	N/A	N/A	N/A	SF
Autumn Gold	DNP	SF	SF	Q	Q	QF	C	N/A	N/A	N/A	N/A
Colonial Square	N/A	N/A	N/A	N/A	R16	C	DNP	N/A	N/A	N/A	N/A
Manitoba Liquor & Lotteries	SF	Q	QF	QF	QF	C	N/A	N/A	N/A	N/A	N/A
Sobeys Slam	DNP	N/A	C	N/A	N/A	N/A	N/A	N/A	N/A	N/A	N/A

== Year-by-year statistics ==
=== Team events ===
Year	Team	Position	Event	Finish	Record	Pct. (Note: Round robin only)
2002	Lawes	Skip	Manitoba 13 and Under	1st	–	–
2003	Lawes	Skip	Manitoba Juniors	DNQ	2–5	–
2003	Manitoba (Neufeld)	Third	Canada Winter Games	11th		–
2004	Lawes	Skip	Manitoba Juniors		5–3	–
2005	Lawes	Skip	Manitoba Juniors		7–3	–
2006	Lawes	Skip	Manitoba Juniors	2nd	8–2	–
2007	Lawes	Skip	Manitoba Juniors	2nd	8–2	–
2008	Lawes (PCC)	Skip	Manitoba Juniors	1st	9–0	–
2008	Manitoba (Lawes)	Skip	Canadian Juniors	1st	11–2	73
2008	Canada (Lawes)	Skip	World Juniors	3rd	7–5	
2009	Lawes (PCC)	Skip	Manitoba Juniors	1st		–
2009	Manitoba (Lawes)	Skip	Canadian Juniors	1st	10–4	72
2009	Canada (Lawes)	Skip	World Juniors	2nd	8–4	78
2009	King (SSC)	Third	Canada Cup	T6th	2–3	
2009	King	Third	COCT – Pre	DNQ	2–3	
2010	King (SSC)	Third	Alberta STOH	3rd	4–3	
2010	Jones (SVCC)	Third	Canada Cup	5th	3–2	
2011	North America	Third	Cont'l Cup	1st	3–0	72
2011	Team Canada (Jones)	Third	2011 STOH	2nd	9–4	81
2011	Jones (SVCC)	Third	Canada Cup	1st	5–3	83
2012	Jones (SVCC)	Third	Manitoba STOH	1st	8–2	
2012	Manitoba (Jones)	Third	2012 STOH	3rd	10–4	85
2012	Team Jones (Note: Lawes skipped Team Jones, as Jones had just given birth and was recovering from a knee surgery.) (SVCC)	Skip	Canada Cup	2nd	5–3	63
2013	North America	Third	Cont'l Cup	1st	3–0–1	82
2013	Jones (SVCC)	Third	Manitoba STOH	1st	8–1	
2013	Manitoba (Jones)	Third	2013 STOH	2nd	12–2	82
2013	Jones	Third	2013 COCT	1st	7–1	84
2014	North America	Third	Cont'l Cup	1st	2–2	82
2014	Canada (Jones)	Third	OG	1st	11–0	83
2014	Jones (SVCC)	Third	Canada Cup	4th	3–3	76
2015	Canada	Third	Cont'l Cup	1st	1–1–2	75
2015	Jones (SVCC)	Third	Manitoba STOH	1st	9–0	
2015	Manitoba (Jones)	Third	2015 STOH	1st	12–1	84
2015	Canada (Jones)	Third	2015 WCC	2nd	10–4	79
2015	Jones (SVCC)	Third	Canada Cup	3rd	4–3	83
2016	North America	Third	Cont'l Cup	1st	4–0–1	82
2016	Team Canada (Jones)	Third	2016 STOH	3rd	10–4	86
2016	Jones (SVCC)	Third	Canada Cup	1st	6–1	83
2017	North America	Third	Cont'l Cup	1st	1–2–1	72
2017	Jones (SVCC)	Third	Manitoba STOH	3rd	7–2	
2017	Jones	Third	2017 COCT	3rd	5–4	82
2018	Jones (SVCC)	Third	Manitoba STOH	1st	8–1	
2018	Canada (Jones)	Third	2018 WCC	1st	14–0	86
2018	Jones (SVCC)	Third	Canada Cup	1st	7–2	81
2019	North America	Third	Cont'l Cup	2nd	2–2	
2019	Team Canada (Jones)	Third	2019 STOH	7th	6–5	78
2019	Canada (Jones)	Third	CWC	1st	5–2	
2019	Jones (SVCC)	Third	Canada Cup	6th	2–4	79
2020	Jones (SVCC)	Third	Manitoba STOH	2nd	6–3	
2020	Jones (SVCC)	Third	STOH Wild Card	1st	1–0	86
2020	Wild Card (Jones)	Third	2020 STOH	3rd	9–4	80
2021	Manitoba (Jones)	Third	2021 STOH	4th	9–4	80
2021	Jones	Third	2021 COCT	1st	7–3	82
2022	Canada (Jones)	Third	OG	5th	5–4	80
2023	Lawes (FRCC)	Skip	Manitoba STOH	3rd	7–2	–
2023	Wild Card 1 (Lawes)	Skip	2023 STOH	T7th	5–4	79
2024	Lawes (FRCC)	Skip	Manitoba STOH	1st	8–1	–
2024	Manitoba (Lawes)	Skip	2024 STOH	T5th	4–5	81
Scotties Tournament of Hearts Totals					86–37	82
World Championship Totals					24–4	83
Olympic Curling Trial Totals					12–5	83
Olympic Games Totals					16–4	81

=== Mixed doubles ===
Year	Partner	Event	Finish	Record	Pct.
2013	John Morris	Cont'l Cup	1st	1–0	73
2014	Jeff Stoughton	Cont'l Cup	1st	1–0	77
2014	Connor Lawes	CMDCT	T13th	4–3	
2015	John Morris	Cont'l Cup	1st	1–0	94
2016	Marc Kennedy	Cont'l Cup	1st	0–0–1	86
2017	Marc Kennedy	Cont'l Cup	1st	1–0	88
2017	Ryan Fry	CMDCC	T21st	2–5	
2018	John Morris	CMDCOT	1st	9–4	75
2018	John Morris	OG	1st	8–1	76
2019	Geoff Walker	Cont'l Cup	2nd	0–1	
2021	Connor Lawes	CMDCC	28th	1–5	69
Olympic Curling Trial Totals				9–4	75
Olympic Games Totals				8–1	76

== Teams ==
Season	Skip	Third	Second	Lead
2007–08	Kaitlyn Lawes	Jenna Loder	Liz Peters	Sarah Wazney
2008–09	Kaitlyn Lawes	Jenna Loder	Laryssa Grenkow	Breanne Meakin
2009–10	Cathy King	Kaitlyn Lawes	Raylene Rocque	Tracy Bush
2010–11	Jennifer Jones	Kaitlyn Lawes	Jill Officer	Dawn Askin
2011–12	Jennifer Jones	Kaitlyn Lawes	Jill Officer	Dawn Askin
2012–13	Jennifer Jones	Kaitlyn Lawes	Jill Officer	Dawn Askin
2013–14	Jennifer Jones	Kaitlyn Lawes	Jill Officer	Dawn McEwen
2014–15	Jennifer Jones	Kaitlyn Lawes	Jill Officer	Dawn McEwen
2015–16	Jennifer Jones	Kaitlyn Lawes	Jill Officer	Dawn McEwen
2016–17	Jennifer Jones	Kaitlyn Lawes	Jill Officer	Dawn McEwen
2017–18	Jennifer Jones	Kaitlyn Lawes	Jill Officer	Dawn McEwen
2018–19	Jennifer Jones	Kaitlyn Lawes	Jocelyn Peterman	Dawn McEwen
2019–20	Jennifer Jones	Kaitlyn Lawes	Jocelyn Peterman	Dawn McEwen
2020–21	Jennifer Jones	Kaitlyn Lawes	Jocelyn Peterman	Dawn McEwen / Lisa Weagle
2021–22	Jennifer Jones	Kaitlyn Lawes	Jocelyn Peterman	Dawn McEwen / Lisa Weagle
2022–23	Kaitlyn Lawes	Selena Njegovan	Jocelyn Peterman	Kristin MacCuish
2023–24	Kaitlyn Lawes	Selena Njegovan	Jocelyn Peterman	Kristin MacCuish
2024–25	Kaitlyn Lawes	Selena Njegovan	Jocelyn Peterman	Kristin Gordon
2025–26	Kaitlyn Lawes (Fourth)	Selena Njegovan (Skip)	Jocelyn Peterman	Kristin Gordon
