= 2019 Manitoba Scotties Tournament of Hearts =

2019 Manitoba Scotties Tournament of Hearts presented by Bayer
- Host city: Gimli, Manitoba
- Arena: Gimli Recreation Complex
- Dates: January 23–27
- Winner: Team Fleury
- Curling club: East St. Paul Curling Club
- Skip: Tracy Fleury
- Third: Selena Njegovan
- Second: Liz Fyfe
- Lead: Kristin MacCuish
- Coach: Andrea Ronnebeck
- Finalist: Kerri Einarson

The 2019 Manitoba Scotties Tournament of Hearts presented by Bayer, the provincial women's curling championship of Manitoba, was held from January 23 to 27 at the Gimli Recreation Complex in Gimli. The winning Tracy Fleury team represented Manitoba at the 2019 Scotties Tournament of Hearts in Sydney, Nova Scotia.

== Qualification ==
Qualification method	Berths	Qualifying team(s)
CTRS leaders	2	Tracy Fleury; Darcy Robertson
Manitoba Curling Tour	3	Kerri Einarson; Allison Flaxey; Alyssa Calvert
Berth Bonspiel	2	Kristy Watling; Beth Peterson
West 1 Region	2	Lisa Hale; Terry Ursel
West 2 Region	1	Tiffany McLean
East Region	1	Rebecca Lamb
South 1 & 2 Regions	2	~~Mackenzie Zacharias~~; Jennifer Clark-Rouire
Winnipeg Region	4	Laura Burtnyk; Abby Ackland; Barb Spencer; Joelle Brown

== Teams ==
The teams are listed as follows:

Skip	Third	Second	Lead	Alternate	Club
Abby Ackland	Hailey Ryan	Emilie Rafnson	Sara Oliver	Brandi Forrest	Assiniboine Memorial
Joelle Brown	Susan Baleja	Natalie Claude-Harding	Carlene Strand	Colleen Kilgallen	Charleswood
Laura Burtnyk	Gaetanne Gauthier	Ashley Groff	Krysten Karwacki	Rachel Burtnyk	Assiniboine Memorial
Alyssa Calvert	Tanya Enns	Pam Robins	Roz Taylor		Brandon
Jennifer Clark-Rouire	Lisa McLeod	Jolene Callum	Sydney Arnal	Brooklyn Meiklejohn	Miami
Kerri Einarson	Val Sweeting	Shannon Birchard	Briane Meilleur		Gimli
Allison Flaxey	Kate Cameron	Taylor McDonald	Raunora Westcott		Granite
Tracy Fleury	Selena Njegovan	Liz Fyfe	Kristin MacCuish		East. St Paul
Lisa Hale	Ashley Surminski	Laurie Macdonnell	Lisa Bartley	Stacy Hime	Dauphin
Rebecca Lamb	Janelle Vachon	Holly Friesen	Brooke Friesen	Kendra Derbowka	Stonewall
Tiffany McLean	Dori-Anne Vince	Hayley Surovy	Cassandra Lesiuk		Brandon
Beth Peterson	Jenna Loder	Katherine Doerksen	Melissa Gordon	Robyn Njegovan	Assiniboine Memorial
Darcy Robertson	Karen Klein	Vanessa Foster	Theresa Cannon	Tanya Enns	Assiniboine Memorial
Barb Spencer	Katie Spencer	Holly Spencer	Allyson Spencer		Assiniboine Memorial
Terry Ursel	Wanda Rainka	Kayla Hunter	Tracy Igonia		Arden
Kristy Watling	Christine MacKay	Taylor Maida	Katrina Thiessen	Kyla Grabowski	Fort Rouge

== Round-robin standings ==
Key
Teams to playoffs
Teams to tiebreaker

Asham Group	W	L
Kerri Einarson	6	1
Beth Peterson	5	2
Abby Ackland	5	2
Allison Flaxey	4	3
Barb Spencer	3	4
Joelle Brown	3	4
Rebecca Lamb	1	6
Lisa Hale	1	6

Asham Express Group	W	L
Darcy Robertson	7	0
Tracy Fleury	6	1
Jennifer Clark-Rouire	3	4
Alyssa Calvert	3	4
Laura Burtnyk	3	4
Kristy Watling	3	4
Tiffany McLean	2	5
Terry Ursel	1	6

== Round-robin results ==
All draw times are listed in Central Standard Time (UTC-06:00)

=== Draw 1 ===
Wednesday, January 23, 08:30

Sheet A	1	2	3	4	5	6	7	8	9	10	Final
Barb Spencer	0	0	3	2	0	0	1	0	0	X	6
Lisa Hale	0	2	0	0	1	0	0	4	4	X	11

Sheet B	1	2	3	4	5	6	7	8	9	10	Final
Allison Flaxey	0	1	1	0	2	1	1	0	1	X	7
Rebecca Lamb	0	0	0	1	0	0	0	2	0	X	3

Sheet C	1	2	3	4	5	6	7	8	9	10	Final
Joelle Brown	0	1	0	0	0	0	1	0	X	X	2
Kerri Einarson	1	0	1	2	2	1	0	2	X	X	9

Sheet D	1	2	3	4	5	6	7	8	9	10	Final
Abby Ackland	0	0	0	1	0	1	0	0	1	0	3
Beth Peterson	0	0	2	0	0	0	2	1	0	1	6

=== Draw 2 ===
Wednesday, January 23, 12:15

Sheet A	1	2	3	4	5	6	7	8	9	10	Final
Kristy Watling	0	2	0	2	0	0	4	2	X	X	10
Terry Ursel	0	0	2	0	0	2	0	0	X	X	4

Sheet B	1	2	3	4	5	6	7	8	9	10	Final
Darcy Robertson	0	1	2	0	1	0	2	1	1	X	8
Laura Burtnyk	2	0	0	1	0	1	0	0	0	X	4

Sheet C	1	2	3	4	5	6	7	8	9	10	Final
Tiffany McLean	0	0	0	1	0	0	0	1	X	X	2
Tracy Fleury	2	0	0	0	3	0	3	0	X	X	8

Sheet D	1	2	3	4	5	6	7	8	9	10	Final
Alyssa Calvert	0	0	0	0	0	1	0	X	X	X	1
Jennifer Clark-Rouire	0	1	3	1	2	0	2	X	X	X	9

=== Draw 3 ===
Wednesday, January 23, 16:00

Sheet A	1	2	3	4	5	6	7	8	9	10	Final
Rebecca Lamb	0	0	0	0	0	X	X	X	X	X	0
Kerri Einarson	2	1	1	2	4	X	X	X	X	X	10

Sheet B	1	2	3	4	5	6	7	8	9	10	Final
Barb Spencer	1	1	1	0	2	0	0	2	0	X	7
Abby Ackland	0	0	0	4	0	1	3	0	1	X	9

Sheet C	1	2	3	4	5	6	7	8	9	10	Final
Lisa Hale	1	0	0	1	0	0	X	X	X	X	2
Beth Peterson	0	4	2	0	2	4	X	X	X	X	12

Sheet D	1	2	3	4	5	6	7	8	9	10	Final
Joelle Brown	1	0	0	2	1	0	2	0	1	0	7
Allison Flaxey	0	1	0	0	0	2	0	2	0	3	8

=== Draw 4 ===
Wednesday, January 23, 20:15

Sheet A	1	2	3	4	5	6	7	8	9	10	Final
Laura Burtnyk	0	0	2	0	0	X	X	X	X	X	2
Tracy Fleury	2	1	0	4	2	X	X	X	X	X	8

Sheet B	1	2	3	4	5	6	7	8	9	10	Final
Kristy Watling	0	1	0	0	2	0	0	0	0	X	3
Alyssa Calvert	1	0	1	1	0	1	1	0	2	X	7

Sheet C	1	2	3	4	5	6	7	8	9	10	Final
Terry Ursel	3	1	0	0	1	0	0	2	1	0	8
Jennifer Clark-Rouire	0	0	1	1	0	0	3	0	0	1	6

Sheet D	1	2	3	4	5	6	7	8	9	10	Final
Tiffany McLean	0	1	0	2	0	1	0	X	X	X	4
Darcy Robertson	3	0	2	0	4	0	1	X	X	X	10

=== Draw 5 ===
Thursday, January 24, 08:30

Sheet A	1	2	3	4	5	6	7	8	9	10	11	Final
Allison Flaxey	1	0	1	0	0	3	0	0	0	1	0	6
Abby Ackland	0	2	0	0	1	0	2	1	0	0	3	9

Sheet B	1	2	3	4	5	6	7	8	9	10	Final
Beth Peterson	1	0	1	0	0	1	0	1	1	0	5
Joelle Brown	0	1	0	1	1	0	2	0	0	1	6

Sheet C	1	2	3	4	5	6	7	8	9	10	Final
Barb Spencer	1	0	0	1	0	1	0	0	3	2	8
Rebecca Lamb	0	0	1	0	2	0	2	1	0	0	6

Sheet D	1	2	3	4	5	6	7	8	9	10	Final
Lisa Hale	1	0	1	0	0	0	1	0	X	X	3
Kerri Einarson	0	2	0	2	1	1	0	1	2	X	9

=== Draw 6 ===
Thursday, January 24, 12:15

Sheet A	1	2	3	4	5	6	7	8	9	10	Final
Darcy Robertson	1	0	2	0	0	1	0	3	1	1	9
Alyssa Calvert	0	1	0	2	2	0	3	0	0	0	8

Sheet B	1	2	3	4	5	6	7	8	9	10	Final
Jennifer Clark-Rouire	0	3	1	1	0	1	1	1	X	X	8
Tiffany McLean	0	0	0	0	1	0	0	0	X	X	1

Sheet C	1	2	3	4	5	6	7	8	9	10	Final
Kristy Watling	0	1	0	0	0	2	2	X	X	X	3
Laura Burtnyk	1	0	3	1	1	0	3	X	X	X	9

Sheet D	1	2	3	4	5	6	7	8	9	10	Final
Terry Ursel	0	0	2	0	0	0	2	0	X	X	4
Tracy Fleury	3	0	0	2	2	2	0	4	X	X	13

=== Draw 7 ===
Thursday, January 24, 16:00

Sheet A	1	2	3	4	5	6	7	8	9	10	11	Final
Joelle Brown	0	0	1	0	0	1	0	2	0	2	0	6
Barb Spencer	0	1	0	0	3	0	1	0	1	0	1	7

Sheet B	1	2	3	4	5	6	7	8	9	10	Final
Kerri Einarson	0	1	0	0	1	1	0	2	0	2	7
Abby Ackland	1	0	0	1	0	0	1	0	2	0	5

Sheet C	1	2	3	4	5	6	7	8	9	10	Final
Lisa Hale	1	1	0	1	0	2	0	1	0	0	6
Allison Flaxey	0	0	2	0	2	0	1	0	1	2	8

Sheet D	1	2	3	4	5	6	7	8	9	10	Final
Beth Peterson	1	1	0	0	0	1	1	2	0	0	6
Rebecca Lamb	0	0	0	0	1	0	0	0	2	1	4

=== Draw 8 ===
Thursday, January 24, 19:45

Sheet A	1	2	3	4	5	6	7	8	9	10	Final
Tiffany McLean	0	1	0	1	1	0	2	0	0	0	5
Kristy Watling	1	0	3	0	0	2	0	2	1	0	9

Sheet B	1	2	3	4	5	6	7	8	9	10	Final
Tracy Fleury	2	3	0	1	0	1	X	X	X	X	7
Alyssa Calvert	0	0	1	0	1	0	X	X	X	X	2

Sheet C	1	2	3	4	5	6	7	8	9	10	Final
Terry Ursel	0	1	0	2	0	3	0	2	0	X	8
Darcy Robertson	2	0	3	0	2	0	4	0	4	X	15

Sheet D	1	2	3	4	5	6	7	8	9	10	Final
Jennifer Clark-Rouire	1	0	2	1	0	0	3	0	0	2	9
Laura Burtnyk	0	2	0	0	2	3	0	0	1	0	8

=== Draw 9 ===
Friday, January 25, 08:30

Sheet A	1	2	3	4	5	6	7	8	9	10	Final
Darcy Robertson	0	1	1	0	1	1	0	0	1	X	5
Jennifer Clark-Rouire	1	0	0	1	0	0	1	0	0	X	3

Sheet B	1	2	3	4	5	6	7	8	9	10	Final
Laura Burtnyk	0	1	3	1	3	0	1	2	X	X	11
Terry Ursel	0	0	0	0	0	2	0	0	X	X	2

Sheet C	1	2	3	4	5	6	7	8	9	10	Final
Alyssa Calvert	2	0	0	0	0	0	3	0	X	X	5
Tiffany McLean	0	1	1	2	3	1	0	2	X	X	10

Sheet D	1	2	3	4	5	6	7	8	9	10	Final
Kristy Watling	0	0	1	0	1	0	1	0	X	X	3
Tracy Fleury	2	2	0	2	0	1	0	1	X	X	8

=== Draw 10 ===
Friday, January 25, 12:15

Sheet A	1	2	3	4	5	6	7	8	9	10	Final
Allison Flaxey	0	0	1	0	0	2	0	1	0	X	4
Beth Peterson	1	0	0	2	1	0	3	0	2	X	9

Sheet B	1	2	3	4	5	6	7	8	9	10	Final
Rebecca Lamb	3	0	1	0	1	2	0	0	4	X	11
Lisa Hale	0	2	0	2	0	0	1	2	0	X	7

Sheet C	1	2	3	4	5	6	7	8	9	10	Final
Abby Ackland	1	0	7	0	1	1	X	X	X	X	10
Joelle Brown	0	1	0	1	0	0	X	X	X	X	2

Sheet D	1	2	3	4	5	6	7	8	9	10	Final
Barb Spencer	0	3	1	0	1	1	0	0	2	X	8
Kerri Einarson	1	0	0	1	0	0	2	1	0	X	5

=== Draw 11 ===
Friday, January 25, 16:00

Sheet A	1	2	3	4	5	6	7	8	9	10	Final
Laura Burtnyk	0	1	0	4	4	0	5	X	X	X	14
Tiffany McLean	0	0	1	0	0	2	0	X	X	X	3

Sheet B	1	2	3	4	5	6	7	8	9	10	Final
Jennifer Clark-Rouire	2	1	0	2	0	1	0	0	0	X	6
Kristy Watling	0	0	2	0	2	0	2	2	1	X	9

Sheet C	1	2	3	4	5	6	7	8	9	10	11	Final
Tracy Fleury	0	0	2	1	0	2	0	0	2	0	0	7
Darcy Robertson	0	1	0	0	1	0	2	2	0	1	1	8

Sheet D	1	2	3	4	5	6	7	8	9	10	Final
Alyssa Calvert	0	2	0	4	0	3	0	0	5	X	14
Terry Ursel	0	0	1	0	2	0	0	2	0	X	5

=== Draw 12 ===
Friday, January 25, 19:45

Sheet A	1	2	3	4	5	6	7	8	9	10	Final
Rebecca Lamb	0	1	3	0	0	0	0	0	0	X	4
Joelle Brown	1	0	0	1	1	2	1	3	1	X	10

Sheet B	1	2	3	4	5	6	7	8	9	10	Final
Beth Peterson	0	3	0	2	3	2	2	X	X	X	12
Barb Spencer	1	0	1	0	0	0	0	X	X	X	2

Sheet C	1	2	3	4	5	6	7	8	9	10	Final
Kerri Einarson	0	2	0	2	2	0	0	2	1	0	9
Allison Flaxey	0	0	2	0	0	2	1	0	0	1	6

Sheet D	1	2	3	4	5	6	7	8	9	10	Final
Abby Ackland	0	0	2	1	0	2	0	1	1	X	7
Lisa Hale	1	1	0	0	1	0	0	0	0	X	3

=== Draw 13 ===
Saturday, January 26, 08:30

Sheet A	1	2	3	4	5	6	7	8	9	10	Final
Tracy Fleury	2	0	0	0	1	0	1	2	2	X	8
Jennifer Clark-Rouire	0	1	0	1	0	1	0	0	0	X	3

Sheet B	1	2	3	4	5	6	7	8	9	10	11	Final
Tiffany McLean	0	2	0	1	1	0	2	0	0	0	1	7
Terry Ursel	1	0	1	0	0	0	0	3	0	1	0	6

Sheet C	1	2	3	4	5	6	7	8	9	10	Final
Alyssa Calvert	1	0	0	2	0	1	0	3	X	X	7
Laura Burtnyk	0	0	0	0	1	0	0	0	X	X	1

Sheet D	1	2	3	4	5	6	7	8	9	10	Final
Darcy Robertson	3	1	2	0	1	X	X	X	X	X	7
Kristy Watling	0	0	0	1	0	X	X	X	X	X	1

=== Draw 14 ===
Saturday, January 26, 12:15

Sheet A	1	2	3	4	5	6	7	8	9	10	Final
Kerri Einarson	1	0	0	3	0	0	0	0	4	X	8
Beth Peterson	0	1	0	0	1	0	1	0	0	X	3

Sheet B	1	2	3	4	5	6	7	8	9	10	Final
Joelle Brown	1	0	1	0	1	1	0	3	X	X	7
Lisa Hale	0	1	0	1	0	0	1	0	X	X	3

Sheet C	1	2	3	4	5	6	7	8	9	10	Final
Abby Ackland	0	2	2	1	1	0	2	X	X	X	8
Rebecca Lamb	0	0	0	0	0	1	0	X	X	X	1

Sheet D	1	2	3	4	5	6	7	8	9	10	Final
Allison Flaxey	0	3	0	3	0	2	0	1	1	X	10
Barb Spencer	0	0	3	0	2	0	1	0	0	X	6

== Tiebreaker ==
Saturday, January 26, 16:00

Sheet D	1	2	3	4	5	6	7	8	9	10	Final
Abby Ackland	0	1	2	0	2	0	0	3	0	0	8
Beth Peterson	0	0	0	2	0	2	1	0	1	1	7

== Playoffs ==
A new format involved ranking the top four teams regardless of which pool they were in, which meant that Team Einarson was put in the 3 vs. 4 game despite winning her pool. This new format was considered controversial by some of the curlers.

Page playoff system
1	Darcy Robertson	6
2	Tracy Fleury	8
3	Kerri Einarson	6
4	Abby Ackland	4

Semifinal
1	Darcy Robertson	4
3	Kerri Einarson	11

Final
2	Tracy Fleury	13
3	Kerri Einarson	7

=== 1 vs. 2 ===
Saturday, January 26, 19:45

Sheet C	1	2	3	4	5	6	7	8	9	10	Final
Darcy Robertson	1	0	1	0	3	0	0	1	0	X	6
Tracy Fleury	0	3	0	3	0	0	0	0	2	X	8

=== 3 vs. 4 ===
Saturday, January 26, 19:45

Sheet B	1	2	3	4	5	6	7	8	9	10	Final
Kerri Einarson	0	0	1	0	0	2	0	1	0	2	6
Abby Ackland	0	1	0	0	1	0	1	0	1	0	4

=== Semifinal ===
Sunday, January 27, 09:00

Sheet C	1	2	3	4	5	6	7	8	9	10	Final
Darcy Robertson	1	0	1	0	0	1	0	1	0	X	4
Kerri Einarson	0	1	0	3	2	0	2	0	3	X	11

Player percentages
Darcy Robertson		Kerri Einarson	
Theresa Cannon	81%	Briane Meilleur	94%
Vanessa Foster	76%	Shannon Birchard	84%
Karen Klein	75%	Val Sweeting	81%
Darcy Robertson	63%	Kerri Einarson	78%
Total	74%	Total	84%

=== Final ===
Sunday, January 27, 15:00

Sheet C	1	2	3	4	5	6	7	8	9	10	Final
Tracy Fleury	1	0	2	0	3	2	0	2	3	X	13
Kerri Einarson	0	5	0	1	0	0	1	0	0	X	7

Player percentages
Tracy Fleury		Kerri Einarson	
Kristin MacCuish	90%	Briane Meilleur	99%
Liz Fyfe	86%	Shannon Birchard	78%
Selena Njegovan	76%	Val Sweeting	74%
Tracy Fleury	71%	Kerri Einarson	68%
Total	81%	Total	80%

2019 Manitoba Scotties Tournament of Hearts

Tracy Fleury
1st Manitoba Provincial Championship title
