= Darcy Robertson =

Canadian curler (born 1965)

- Curler
- Born: Darcy Kirkness; March 13, 1965 (age 61); Winnipeg, Manitoba, Canada

Team
- Curling club: Assiniboine Memorial CC, Winnipeg, MB
- Skip: Darcy Robertson
- Third: Rhonda Varnes
- Second: Brooklyn Meiklejohn
- Lead: Kylie Lippens
- Alternate: Erika Campbell

Curling career
- Member Association: Manitoba
- Hearts: 3 (1986, 2003, 2009)
- Top CTRS ranking: 8th (2017–18, 2018–19)

Darcy Robertson (born Darcy Kirkness, March 13, 1965) is a Canadian curler. She is a three-time provincial champion and former Canadian junior champion.

== Career ==
Robertson had a successful junior career which involved winning the 1984 Canadian Junior Women's Curling Championship with her younger sister Barb, Janet Harvey and Barbara Fetch. Two years later, Robertson, her sister Barb, Fetch and Faye Irwin would win the provincial women's championship and would be given the right to represent Manitoba at the 1986 Scott Tournament of Hearts. At the Hearts, the team went 6–5 in the round robin and missed the playoffs. Also in 1986, Robertson won the provincial mixed championship playing lead for Hal Tanasichuk.

Robertson would not win another provincial championship until 2003, playing third for her sister, Barb. The team finished the round robin at the 2003 Scott Tournament of Hearts with a 4–7 record. Robertson formed her own rink between 2005 and 2008, when she joined forces with her sister again. Barb and Darcy won another provincial in 2009, benefiting from previous Manitoba champion Jennifer Jones getting a bye to the Hearts as defending champions. The team finished with a 2–9 record, tied for last place.

Robertson left her sister's rink again in 2011 to form her own team. She won her first World Curling Tour event in 2012 at the 2012 DEKALB Superspiel, where she just happened to beat her sister's team in the final. The following season, Team Robertson won the 2013 Atkins Curling Supplies Women's Classic where they beat Jill Thurston's rink in the final. She won the Atkins Curling Supplies event once again in 2015, again defeating her sister's team in the final game.

Robertson had her best provincial championship since her win in 2009 at the 2017 Manitoba Scotties Tournament of Hearts where her team of Karen Klein, Vanessa Foster and Michelle Madden finished the round robin with a 5–2 record. This qualified them for a tiebreaker, where they defeated defending provincial champions Kerri Einarson to advance to the playoffs. The team then defeated Shannon Birchard in the 3 vs. 4 game and upset Jennifer Jones in the semifinal to advance to the final where they faced Michelle Englot. Tied 6–6 in the final end, Englot scored two for the win and the berth to the 2017 Scotties. Also during the 2016–17 season, the team won the MCT Championships.

Robertson and her team played in the 2017 Canadian Olympic Curling Pre-Trials, finishing with a 2–4 record, and failing to advance to the playoffs.

Team Robertson returned to the provincial championship the following year at the 2018 Manitoba Scotties Tournament of Hearts and qualified for the playoffs with a 6–1 record. The team then once again won the 3 vs. 4 and semifinal games before dropping the final to Jennifer Jones, who went on to win the 2018 Scotties Tournament of Hearts and 2018 World Women's Curling Championship. Robertson also claimed her fifth tour win of her career this season, winning The Sunova Spiel at East St. Paul over Rhonda Varnes.

Team Robertson had their most successful tour season to date during the 2018–19 season. Not only did the team win two more tour events at the 2018 Icebreaker at The Granite and the 2018 Colonial Square Ladies Classic, but they also played in three Grand Slam of Curling events, qualifying for the playoffs in both the 2018 Masters and the 2018 Tour Challenge. The team also competed in the 2018 Canada Cup, finishing last with a 1–6 record. In January 2019, Team Robertson represented Canada at the third leg of the 2018–19 Curling World Cup, finishing with a winless 0–6 record. At the 2019 Manitoba Scotties Tournament of Hearts, the team lost in the semifinal to Kerri Einarson.

Robertson formed a new team the following season with Laura Burtnyk, Gaetanne Gauthier and Krysten Karwacki. At the 2020 Manitoba Scotties Tournament of Hearts, the team failed to advance to the playoffs, finishing the round robin with a 3–2 record.

== Personal life ==
Robertson is employed as a dental hygienist for Lifesmiles Dental Corp. She is married to Reid Robertson and has four children.

== Grand Slam record ==
Key
C	Champion
F	Lost in Final
SF	Lost in Semifinal
QF	Lost in Quarterfinals
R16	Lost in the round of 16
Q	Did not advance to playoffs
T2	Played in Tier 2 event
DNP	Did not participate in event
N/A	Not a Grand Slam event that season

Event	2006–07	2007–08	2008–09	2009–10	2010–11	2011–12	2012–13	2013–14	2014–15	2015–16	2016–17	2017–18	2018–19
Masters	N/A	N/A	N/A	N/A	N/A	N/A	DNP	DNP	DNP	DNP	DNP	DNP	QF
Tour Challenge	N/A	N/A	N/A	N/A	N/A	N/A	N/A	N/A	N/A	DNP	DNP	DNP	QF
Canadian Open	N/A	N/A	N/A	N/A	N/A	N/A	N/A	N/A	DNP	DNP	DNP	Q	Q
Players'	Q	Q	Q	DNP	DNP	DNP	DNP	DNP	DNP	DNP	DNP	DNP	DNP

=== Former events ===
Event	2006–07	2007–08	2008–09	2009–10	2010–11	2011–12	2012–13	2013–14
Wayden Transportation	DNP	Q	DNP	N/A	N/A	N/A	N/A	N/A
Autumn Gold	DNP	Q	QF	Q	DNP	DNP	DNP	DNP
Manitoba Liquor & Lotteries	QF	Q	QF	QF	Q	QF	Q	Q
Colonial Square Ladies Classic	N/A	N/A	N/A	N/A	N/A	N/A	Q	DNP
