= 2018 Masters (curling) =

Grand Slam of Curling event

2018 Canadian Beef Masters
- Host city: Truro, Nova Scotia
- Arena: Rath Eastlink Arena
- Dates: October 23–28
- Men's winner: (Ontario) John Epping
- Curling club: Leaside CC, East York, Toronto
- Skip: John Epping
- Third: Mat Camm
- Second: Brent Laing
- Lead: Craig Savill
- Finalist: (Alberta) Kevin Koe
- Women's winner: (Sweden) Anna Hasselborg
- Curling club: Sundbybergs CK, Sundbyberg, Sweden
- Skip: Anna Hasselborg
- Third: Sara McManus
- Second: Agnes Knochenhauer
- Lead: Sofia Mabergs
- Finalist: (Ontario) Rachel Homan

The 2018 Canadian Beef Masters was held from October 23 to 28, at the Rath Eastlink Arena in Truro, Nova Scotia. This was the second Grand Slam and first major of the 2018–19 curling season.

On the men's side, John Epping defeated Kevin Koe 7–4 in the final, completing a career Grand Slam for Epping, winning all four major events. On the women's side, Anna Hasselborg defeated Rachel Homan 8–7 to win their second straight Grand Slam.

== Qualification ==
The top 14 men's and women's teams on the World Curling Tour order of merit standing as of September 20, 2018 qualified for the event. The Grand Slam of Curling may fill one spot in each division as a sponsor's exemption. In the event that a team declines its invitation, the next-ranked team on the order of merit is invited until the field is complete.

=== Men ===
Top Order of Merit men's teams as of September 20:

1. (Sweden) Niklas Edin
2. (Newfoundland and Labrador) Brad Gushue
3. (Alberta) Kevin Koe
4. (Scotland) Bruce Mouat
5. (Manitoba) Jason Gunnlaugson
6. (Ontario) John Epping
7. (Ontario) Brad Jacobs
8. (Switzerland) ~~Peter de Cruz~~
9. (Manitoba) Reid Carruthers
10. (Norway) Steffen Walstad
11. (Alberta) ~~Brendan Bottcher~~
12. (Ontario) Glenn Howard
13. (United States) John Shuster
14. (Norway) ~~Thomas Ulsrud~~
15. (United States) ~~Rich Ruohonen~~
16. (Scotland) Ross Paterson
17. (Switzerland) Yannick Schwaller
18. (Saskatchewan) Matt Dunstone

Sponsor's exemption:

- (Nova Scotia) Jamie Murphy

=== Women ===
Top Order of Merit women's teams as of September 20:

1. (Sweden) Anna Hasselborg
2. (Manitoba) Jennifer Jones
3. (Ontario) Rachel Homan
4. (Manitoba) Tracy Fleury
5. (Scotland) Eve Muirhead
6. (United States) Jamie Sinclair
7. (Alberta) Laura Walker
8. (United States) Nina Roth
9. (South Korea) ~~Kim Eun-jung~~
10. (Japan) Satsuki Fujisawa
11. (Manitoba) Kerri Einarson
12. (Switzerland) Silvana Tirinzoni
13. (Manitoba) Darcy Robertson
14. (Alberta) Casey Scheidegger
15. (Alberta) Chelsea Carey

Sponsor's exemption:

- (Nova Scotia) Kaitlyn Jones

== Men ==
=== Teams ===
Skip	Third	Second	Lead	Locale
Mike McEwen (Fourth)	Reid Carruthers (Skip)	Matt Wozniak	Colin Hodgson	Winnipeg, Manitoba
Matt Dunstone	Braeden Moskowy	Catlin Schneider	Dustin Kidby	Regina, Saskatchewan
Niklas Edin	Oskar Eriksson	Rasmus Wranå	Christoffer Sundgren	Karlstad, Sweden
John Epping	Mat Camm	Brent Laing	Craig Savill	Toronto, Ontario
Jason Gunnlaugson	Alex Forrest	Denni Neufeld	Connor Njegovan	Winnipeg, Manitoba
Brad Gushue	Mark Nichols	Brett Gallant	Geoff Walker	St. John's, Newfoundland and Labrador
Glenn Howard	Scott Howard	David Mathers	Tim March	Penetanguishene, Ontario
Brad Jacobs	Ryan Fry	E. J. Harnden	Ryan Harnden	Sault Ste. Marie, Ontario
Kevin Koe	B. J. Neufeld	Colton Flasch	Ben Hebert	Calgary, Alberta
Bruce Mouat	Grant Hardie	Bobby Lammie	Hammy McMillan Jr.	Stirling, Scotland
Jamie Murphy	Paul Flemming	Scott Saccary	Phil Crowell	Halifax, Nova Scotia
Ross Paterson	Kyle Waddell	Duncan Menzies	Michael Goodfellow	Glasgow, Scotland
Yannick Schwaller	Michael Brunner	Romano Meier	Marcel Käufeler	Bern, Switzerland
John Shuster	Chris Plys	Matt Hamilton	John Landsteiner	Duluth, United States
Steffen Walstad	Markus Høiberg	Magnus Nedregotten	Magnus Vågberg	Oppdal, Norway

=== Round-robin standings ===
Key
Teams to playoffs
Teams to tiebreakers

Pool A	W	L	PF	PA	SO
(United States) John Shuster	3	1	28	17	5
(Newfoundland and Labrador) Brad Gushue	3	1	24	19	6
(Saskatchewan) Matt Dunstone	2	2	26	19	3
(Manitoba) Reid Carruthers	2	2	16	19	8
(Manitoba) Jason Gunnlaugson	0	4	11	31	

Pool B	W	L	PF	PA	SO
(Scotland) Ross Paterson	3	1	25	22	1
(Sweden) Niklas Edin	3	1	23	15	2
(Ontario) John Epping	3	1	27	20	7
(Switzerland) Yannick Schwaller	1	3	21	22	
(Ontario) Brad Jacobs	0	4	12	29	

Pool C	W	L	PF	PA	SO
(Alberta) Kevin Koe	4	0	31	11	10
(Scotland) Bruce Mouat	3	1	26	15	4
(Nova Scotia) Jamie Murphy	2	2	23	21	9
(Ontario) Glenn Howard	1	3	12	23	
(Norway) Steffen Walstad	0	4	9	31	

=== Round-robin results ===
All draw times are listed in Atlantic Daylight time (UTC-3).

==== Draw 1 ====
Tuesday, October 23, 7:00 pm

Sheet A	1	2	3	4	5	6	7	8	Final
(Ontario) Glenn Howard 🔨	1	0	0	1	0	0	0	X	2
(Nova Scotia) Jamie Murphy	0	2	0	0	2	1	1	X	6

Sheet D	1	2	3	4	5	6	7	8	Final
(United States) John Shuster 🔨	1	1	0	2	0	2	0	2	8
(Saskatchewan) Matt Dunstone	0	0	2	0	3	0	2	0	7

==== Draw 2 ====
Wednesday, October 24, 8:00 am

Sheet C	1	2	3	4	5	6	7	8	Final
(Sweden) Niklas Edin 🔨	1	0	2	1	0	0	3	X	7
(Scotland) Ross Paterson	0	1	0	0	0	2	0	X	3

Sheet D	1	2	3	4	5	6	7	8	Final
(Scotland) Bruce Mouat	1	1	0	1	1	3	X	X	7
(Norway) Steffen Walstad	0	0	2	0	0	0	X	X	2

==== Draw 3 ====
Wednesday, October 24, 11:30 am

Sheet A	1	2	3	4	5	6	7	8	Final
(Manitoba) Jason Gunnlaugson	0	2	2	0	0	0	0	0	4
(Manitoba) Reid Carruthers 🔨	1	0	0	1	2	1	1	2	8

Sheet C	1	2	3	4	5	6	7	8	Final
(Ontario) John Epping 🔨	2	0	1	0	2	2	0	X	7
(Switzerland) Yannick Schwaller	0	2	0	2	0	0	1	X	5

Sheet D	1	2	3	4	5	6	7	8	Final
(Alberta) Kevin Koe	1	0	0	2	0	1	0	4	8
(Nova Scotia) Jamie Murphy 🔨	0	0	1	0	3	0	1	0	5

==== Draw 4 ====
Wednesday, October 24, 3:30 pm

Sheet C	1	2	3	4	5	6	7	8	Final
(Scotland) Bruce Mouat 🔨	6	0	2	0	X	X	X	X	8
(Ontario) Glenn Howard	0	1	0	1	X	X	X	X	2

Sheet D	1	2	3	4	5	6	7	8	Final
(Ontario) Brad Jacobs	0	0	1	0	0	2	0	X	3
(Scotland) Ross Paterson 🔨	1	2	0	0	2	0	2	X	7

==== Draw 5 ====
Wednesday, October 24, 7:30 pm

Sheet A	1	2	3	4	5	6	7	8	9	Final
(Newfoundland and Labrador) Brad Gushue	0	2	0	0	1	0	3	0	1	7
(Saskatchewan) Matt Dunstone 🔨	1	0	2	1	0	1	0	1	0	6

Sheet C	1	2	3	4	5	6	7	8	Final
(Manitoba) Jason Gunnlaugson	0	0	1	0	0	X	X	X	1
(United States) John Shuster	0	3	0	2	3	X	X	X	8

==== Draw 6 ====
Thursday, October 25, 8:00 am

Sheet B	1	2	3	4	5	6	7	8	9	Final
(Ontario) John Epping	0	0	1	1	0	2	2	0	1	7
(Ontario) Brad Jacobs 🔨	1	1	0	0	3	0	0	1	0	6

Sheet D	1	2	3	4	5	6	7	8	Final
(Sweden) Niklas Edin	1	2	0	1	0	0	2	1	7
(Switzerland) Yannick Schwaller 🔨	0	0	1	0	3	0	0	0	4

Sheet E	1	2	3	4	5	6	7	8	Final
(Alberta) Kevin Koe	1	0	2	0	2	0	3	X	8
(Norway) Steffen Walstad 🔨	0	1	0	1	0	1	0	X	3

==== Draw 7 ====
Thursday, October 25, 11:30 am

Sheet B	1	2	3	4	5	6	7	8	Final
(Manitoba) Reid Carruthers	0	1	0	1	2	0	0	1	5
(United States) John Shuster 🔨	1	0	0	0	0	0	3	0	4

==== Draw 8 ====
Thursday, October 25, 3:30 pm

Sheet A	1	2	3	4	5	6	7	8	Final
(Ontario) John Epping	0	0	3	0	0	3	0	1	7
(Scotland) Ross Paterson 🔨	1	0	0	3	1	0	3	0	8

Sheet B	1	2	3	4	5	6	7	8	Final
(Alberta) Kevin Koe	1	3	0	0	3	X	X	X	7
(Ontario) Glenn Howard 🔨	0	0	0	1	0	X	X	X	1

Sheet E	1	2	3	4	5	6	7	8	Final
(Scotland) Bruce Mouat 🔨	0	3	0	1	0	0	5	X	9
(Nova Scotia) Jamie Murphy	0	0	1	0	0	2	0	X	3

==== Draw 9 ====
Thursday, October 25, 7:30 pm

Sheet B	1	2	3	4	5	6	7	8	Final
(Manitoba) Jason Gunnlaugson	0	0	0	3	0	0	0	X	3
(Saskatchewan) Matt Dunstone 🔨	0	3	0	0	1	1	2	X	7

Sheet C	1	2	3	4	5	6	7	8	Final
(Sweden) Niklas Edin 🔨	2	0	1	0	0	1	4	X	8
(Ontario) Brad Jacobs	0	1	0	1	0	0	0	X	2

Sheet E	1	2	3	4	5	6	7	8	Final
(Newfoundland and Labrador) Brad Gushue	1	1	0	0	2	1	0	X	5
(Manitoba) Reid Carruthers 🔨	0	0	0	1	0	0	1	X	2

==== Draw 10 ====
Friday, October 26, 8:00 am

Sheet E	1	2	3	4	5	6	7	8	Final
(Scotland) Ross Paterson 🔨	1	0	1	0	1	0	3	1	7
(Switzerland) Yannick Schwaller	0	2	0	2	0	1	0	0	5

==== Draw 11 ====
Friday, October 26, 11:30 am

Sheet A	1	2	3	4	5	6	7	8	Final
(Norway) Steffen Walstad	0	1	0	1	0	X	X	X	2
(Nova Scotia) Jamie Murphy 🔨	2	0	4	0	3	X	X	X	9

Sheet C	1	2	3	4	5	6	7	8	Final
(Newfoundland and Labrador) Brad Gushue	0	2	1	0	0	1	0	X	4
(United States) John Shuster 🔨	2	0	0	2	1	0	3	X	8

Sheet D	1	2	3	4	5	6	7	8	Final
(Manitoba) Reid Carruthers	0	0	0	1	0	0	0	X	1
(Saskatchewan) Matt Dunstone 🔨	2	0	1	0	0	2	1	X	6

Sheet E	1	2	3	4	5	6	7	8	Final
(Sweden) Niklas Edin 🔨	0	1	0	0	0	0	X	X	1
(Ontario) John Epping	1	0	1	1	1	2	X	X	6

==== Draw 12 ====
Friday, October 26, 3:30 pm

Sheet A	1	2	3	4	5	6	7	8	Final
(Ontario) Brad Jacobs	0	0	1	0	X	X	X	X	1
(Switzerland) Yannick Schwaller 🔨	2	1	0	4	X	X	X	X	7

==== Draw 13 ====
Friday, October 26, 8:00 pm

Sheet B	1	2	3	4	5	6	7	8	Final
(Norway) Steffen Walstad	0	1	0	0	0	1	0	X	2
(Ontario) Glenn Howard 🔨	2	0	0	1	1	0	3	X	7

Sheet C	1	2	3	4	5	6	7	8	Final
(Alberta) Kevin Koe	1	3	2	0	2	X	X	X	8
(Scotland) Bruce Mouat 🔨	0	0	0	2	0	X	X	X	2

Sheet D	1	2	3	4	5	6	7	8	Final
(Newfoundland and Labrador) Brad Gushue	0	1	1	2	0	4	X	X	8
(Manitoba) Jason Gunnlaugson	1	0	0	0	2	0	X	X	3

=== Tiebreakers ===
Saturday, October 27, 8:00 am

Sheet E	1	2	3	4	5	6	7	8	Final
(Manitoba) Reid Carruthers	0	0	2	0	1	0	1	0	4
(Nova Scotia) Jamie Murphy 🔨	0	1	0	1	0	2	0	1	5

Saturday, October 27, 11:30 am

Sheet A	1	2	3	4	5	6	7	8	Final
(Saskatchewan) Matt Dunstone 🔨	0	1	1	2	0	0	3	X	7
(Nova Scotia) Jamie Murphy	0	0	0	0	2	1	0	X	3

=== Playoffs ===
Quarterfinals
1	(Alberta) Kevin Koe	6
8	(Saskatchewan) Matt Dunstone	4
4	(Scotland) Bruce Mouat	9
5	(United States) John Shuster	3
2	(Scotland) Ross Paterson	5
7	(Ontario) John Epping	9
3	(Sweden) Niklas Edin	4
6	(Newfoundland and Labrador) Brad Gushue	2

Semifinals
1	(Alberta) Kevin Koe	6
4	(Scotland) Bruce Mouat	5
7	(Ontario) John Epping	8
3	(Sweden) Niklas Edin	3

Final
1	(Alberta) Kevin Koe	4
7	(Ontario) John Epping	7

==== Quarterfinals ====
Saturday, October 27, 11:30 am

Sheet B	1	2	3	4	5	6	7	8	Final
(Scotland) Bruce Mouat 🔨	2	0	3	0	0	1	3	X	9
(United States) John Shuster	0	1	0	1	1	0	0	X	3

Player percentages
(Scotland) Bruce Mouat		(United States) John Shuster	
Hammy McMillan Jr.	76%	John Landsteiner	97%
Bobby Lammie	88%	Matt Hamilton	73%
Grant Hardie	85%	Chris Plys	67%
Bruce Mouat	84%	John Shuster	54%
Total	83%	Total	73%

Sheet C	1	2	3	4	5	6	7	8	Final
(Sweden) Niklas Edin 🔨	0	1	0	2	0	0	0	1	4
(Newfoundland and Labrador) Brad Gushue	0	0	1	0	1	0	0	0	2

Player percentages
(Sweden) Niklas Edin		(Newfoundland and Labrador) Brad Gushue	
Christoffer Sundgren	83%	Geoff Walker	88%
Rasmus Wranå	95%	Brett Gallant	65%
Oskar Eriksson	89%	Mark Nichols	76%
Niklas Edin	96%	Brad Gushue	90%
Total	91%	Total	80%

Sheet D	1	2	3	4	5	6	7	8	Final
(Scotland) Ross Paterson	1	0	0	1	0	3	0	X	5
(Ontario) John Epping 🔨	0	0	3	0	3	0	3	X	9

Player percentages
(Scotland) Ross Paterson		(Ontario) John Epping	
Michael Goodfellow	92%	Craig Savill	85%
Duncas Menzies	80%	Brent Laing	85%
Kyle Waddell	73%	Mat Camm	73%
Ross Paterson	75%	John Epping	74%
Total	80%	Total	79%

Saturday, October 27, 4:00 pm

Sheet E	1	2	3	4	5	6	7	8	Final
(Alberta) Kevin Koe 🔨	1	0	2	2	0	0	0	1	6
(Saskatchewan) Matt Dunstone	0	1	0	0	2	1	0	0	4

Player percentages
(Alberta) Kevin Koe		(Saskatchewan) Matt Dunstone	
Ben Hebert	96%	Dustin Kidby	87%
Colton Flasch	85%	Catlin Schneider	71%
B. J. Neufeld	84%	Braeden Moskowy	87%
Kevin Koe	84%	Matt Dunstone	81%
Total	87%	Total	82%

==== Semifinals ====
Sunday, October 28, 10:00 am

Sheet B	1	2	3	4	5	6	7	8	Final
(Ontario) John Epping 🔨	1	0	0	3	1	0	3	X	8
(Sweden) Niklas Edin	0	0	2	0	0	1	0	X	3

Player percentages
(Ontario) John Epping		(Sweden) Niklas Edin	
Craig Savill	77%	Christoffer Sundgren	88%
Brent Laing	72%	Rasmus Wranå	80%
Mat Camm	78%	Oskar Eriksson	77%
John Epping	93%	Niklas Edin	76%
Total	80%	Total	81%

Sheet D	1	2	3	4	5	6	7	8	Final
(Alberta) Kevin Koe 🔨	2	0	1	0	0	0	0	3	6
(Scotland) Bruce Mouat	0	2	0	1	1	0	1	0	5

Player percentages
(Alberta) Kevin Koe		(Scotland) Bruce Mouat	
Ben Hebert	75%	Hammy McMillan Jr.	86%
Colton Flasch	79%	Bobby Lammie	74%
B. J. Neufeld	85%	Grant Hardie	92%
Kevin Koe	75%	Bruce Mouat	85%
Total	78%	Total	84%

==== Final ====
Sunday, October 28, 2:00 pm

Sheet C	1	2	3	4	5	6	7	8	Final
(Alberta) Kevin Koe 🔨	1	0	0	0	0	2	1	0	4
(Ontario) John Epping	0	2	0	1	2	0	0	2	7

Player percentages
(Alberta) Kevin Koe		(Ontario) John Epping	
Ben Hebert	84%	Craig Savill	76%
Colton Flasch	73%	Brent Laing	86%
B. J. Neufeld	76%	Mat Camm	67%
Kevin Koe	66%	John Epping	81%
Total	75%	Total	77%

== Women ==
=== Teams ===
Skip	Third	Second	Lead	Locale
Chelsea Carey	Sarah Wilkes	Dana Ferguson	Heather Rogers	Edmonton, Alberta
Kerri Einarson	Val Sweeting	Shannon Birchard	Briane Meilleur	Winnipeg, Manitoba
Tracy Fleury	Selena Njegovan	Liz Fyfe	Kristin MacCuish	Winnipeg, Manitoba
Satsuki Fujisawa	Chinami Yoshida	Yumi Suzuki	Yurika Yoshida	Kitami, Japan
Anna Hasselborg	Sara McManus	Agnes Knochenhauer	Sofia Mabergs	Sundbyberg, Sweden
Rachel Homan	Emma Miskew	Joanne Courtney	Lisa Weagle	Ottawa, Ontario
Jennifer Jones	Kaitlyn Lawes	Jocelyn Peterman	Dawn McEwen	Winnipeg, Manitoba
Kaitlyn Jones	Lauren Lenentine	Karlee Burgess	Lindsey Burgess	Halifax, Nova Scotia
Eve Muirhead	Jennifer Dodds	Vicki Chalmers	Lauren Gray	Stirling, Scotland
Darcy Robertson	Karen Klein	Vanessa Foster	Theresa Cannon	Winnipeg, Manitoba
Nina Roth	Tabitha Peterson	Aileen Geving	Becca Hamilton	Chaska, United States
Casey Scheidegger	Cary-Anne McTaggart	Jessie Haughian	Kristie Moore	Lethbridge, Alberta
Jamie Sinclair	Alex Carlson	Sarah Anderson	Monica Walker	Chaska, United States
Alina Pätz (Fourth)	Silvana Tirinzoni (Skip)	Esther Neuenschwander	Melanie Barbezat	Aarau, Switzerland
Laura Walker	Cathy Overton-Clapham	Lori Olson-Johns	Laine Peters	Edmonton, Alberta

=== Round-robin standings ===
Key
Teams to playoffs
Teams to tiebreakers

Pool A	W	L	PF	PA	SO
(Alberta) Casey Scheidegger	3	1	21	17	4
(Alberta) Laura Walker	2	2	23	23	1
(Sweden) Anna Hasselborg	2	2	22	26	2
(Japan) Satsuki Fujisawa	2	2	25	21	3
(United States) Jamie Sinclair	1	3	11	25	

Pool B	W	L	PF	PA	SO
(Manitoba) Jennifer Jones	3	1	30	20	12
(Alberta) Chelsea Carey	2	2	18	24	5
(United States) Nina Roth	2	2	23	27	6
(Manitoba) Darcy Robertson	2	2	28	19	9
(Scotland) Eve Muirhead	1	3	15	24	

Pool C	W	L	PF	PA	SO
(Ontario) Rachel Homan	3	1	27	16	7
(Nova Scotia) Kaitlyn Jones	3	1	21	21	8
(Manitoba) Kerri Einarson	2	2	18	21	10
(Manitoba) Tracy Fleury	2	2	24	17	11
(Switzerland) Silvana Tirinzoni	0	4	17	28	

=== Round-robin results ===
All draw times are listed in Atlantic Daylight time (UTC-3).

==== Draw 1 ====
Tuesday, October 23, 7:00 pm

Sheet B	1	2	3	4	5	6	7	8	Final
(United States) Jamie Sinclair	0	1	0	2	0	0	0	X	3
(Japan) Satsuki Fujisawa 🔨	2	0	1	0	2	2	1	X	8

Sheet C	1	2	3	4	5	6	7	8	Final
(Switzerland) Silvana Tirinzoni	0	0	3	0	1	0	0	X	4
(Nova Scotia) Kaitlyn Jones 🔨	0	4	0	1	0	1	1	X	7

Sheet E	1	2	3	4	5	6	7	8	Final
(Ontario) Rachel Homan 🔨	0	2	1	0	0	2	1	X	6
(Manitoba) Tracy Fleury	0	0	0	1	1	0	0	X	2

==== Draw 2 ====
Wednesday, October 24, 8:00 am

Sheet A	1	2	3	4	5	6	7	8	Final
(United States) Nina Roth	1	0	2	1	0	0	1	0	5
(Alberta) Chelsea Carey 🔨	0	0	0	0	4	1	0	1	6

Sheet B	1	2	3	4	5	6	7	8	9	Final
(Sweden) Anna Hasselborg 🔨	0	0	0	2	0	1	0	2	0	5
(Alberta) Casey Scheidegger	0	1	1	0	2	0	1	0	1	6

Sheet E	1	2	3	4	5	6	7	8	Final
(Scotland) Eve Muirhead 🔨	0	2	0	1	0	0	1	X	4
(Manitoba) Darcy Robertson	1	0	3	0	3	1	0	X	8

==== Draw 3 ====
Wednesday, October 24, 11:30 am

Sheet B	1	2	3	4	5	6	7	8	Final
(Manitoba) Tracy Fleury	0	1	0	0	0	2	0	X	3
(Manitoba) Kerri Einarson 🔨	2	0	0	1	2	0	2	X	7

Sheet B	1	2	3	4	5	6	7	8	Final
(Alberta) Laura Walker	0	3	0	2	1	0	0	0	6
(United States) Jamie Sinclair	1	0	2	0	0	1	2	1	7

==== Draw 4 ====
Wednesday, October 24, 3:30 pm

Sheet B	1	2	3	4	5	6	7	8	Final
(Scotland) Eve Muirhead 🔨	0	0	1	0	2	1	0	0	4
(United States) Nina Roth	2	3	0	1	0	0	1	1	8

Sheet E	1	2	3	4	5	6	7	8	Final
(Japan) Satsuki Fujisawa 🔨	0	3	1	0	0	1	1	0	6
(Alberta) Casey Scheidegger	2	0	0	2	1	0	0	2	7

==== Draw 5 ====
Wednesday, October 24, 7:30 pm

Sheet B	1	2	3	4	5	6	7	8	9	Final
(Manitoba) Jennifer Jones	0	0	1	0	2	2	1	0	1	7
(Manitoba) Darcy Robertson 🔨	2	1	0	1	0	0	0	2	0	6

Sheet D	1	2	3	4	5	6	7	8	9	Final
(Ontario) Rachel Homan	0	3	0	0	2	0	2	0	1	8
(Switzerland) Silvana Tirinzoni 🔨	1	0	1	1	0	1	0	3	0	7

Sheet E	1	2	3	4	5	6	7	8	Final
(Manitoba) Kerri Einarson 🔨	0	0	1	1	1	0	2	0	5
(Nova Scotia) Kaitlyn Jones	0	1	0	0	0	2	0	3	6

==== Draw 6 ====
Thursday, October 25, 8:00 am

Sheet C	1	2	3	4	5	6	7	8	Final
(Alberta) Laura Walker 🔨	3	0	1	0	0	2	0	1	7
(Japan) Satsuki Fujisawa	0	1	0	2	1	0	2	0	6

==== Draw 7 ====
Thursday, October 25, 11:30 am

Sheet A	1	2	3	4	5	6	7	8	Final
(Manitoba) Tracy Fleury 🔨	0	2	0	2	0	4	X	X	8
(Switzerland) Silvana Tirinzoni	0	0	1	0	1	0	X	X	2

Sheet C	1	2	3	4	5	6	7	8	Final
(United States) Jamie Sinclair	0	0	0	0	0	0	0	X	0
(Alberta) Casey Scheidegger 🔨	0	1	0	0	1	1	1	X	4

Sheet D	1	2	3	4	5	6	7	8	Final
(United States) Nina Roth	0	0	0	1	1	0	X	X	2
(Manitoba) Darcy Robertson 🔨	3	0	3	0	0	4	X	X	10

Sheet E	1	2	3	4	5	6	7	8	Final
(Manitoba) Jennifer Jones	0	2	2	2	0	5	X	X	11
(Alberta) Chelsea Carey 🔨	1	0	0	0	2	0	X	X	3

==== Draw 8 ====
Thursday, October 25, 3:30 pm

Sheet C	1	2	3	4	5	6	7	8	Final
(Ontario) Rachel Homan 🔨	1	0	2	2	1	2	X	X	8
(Manitoba) Kerri Einarson	0	1	0	0	0	0	X	X	1

Sheet D	1	2	3	4	5	6	7	8	Final
(Sweden) Anna Hasselborg	0	1	0	2	2	1	0	X	6
(Alberta) Laura Walker 🔨	1	0	2	0	0	0	1	X	4

==== Draw 9 ====
Thursday, October 25, 7:30 pm

Sheet A	1	2	3	4	5	6	7	8	Final
(Manitoba) Jennifer Jones	1	0	1	0	2	1	0	X	5
(Scotland) Eve Muirhead 🔨	0	1	0	1	0	0	1	X	3

Sheet D	1	2	3	4	5	6	7	8	Final
(Manitoba) Tracy Fleury 🔨	0	2	0	0	3	1	1	X	7
(Nova Scotia) Kaitlyn Jones	1	0	0	1	0	0	0	X	2

==== Draw 10 ====
Friday, October 26, 8:00 am

Sheet A	1	2	3	4	5	6	7	8	Final
(Sweden) Anna Hasselborg 🔨	0	2	0	4	1	X	X	X	7
(United States) Jamie Sinclair	0	0	1	0	0	X	X	X	1

Sheet B	1	2	3	4	5	6	7	8	Final
(Manitoba) Kerri Einarson	0	1	0	1	0	0	2	1	5
(Switzerland) Silvana Tirinzoni 🔨	2	0	1	0	1	0	0	0	4

Sheet C	1	2	3	4	5	6	7	8	Final
(Manitoba) Darcy Robertson 🔨	1	1	0	1	0	1	0	0	4
(Alberta) Chelsea Carey	0	0	3	0	1	0	0	2	6

==== Draw 11 ====
Friday, October 26, 11:30 pm

Sheet B	1	2	3	4	5	6	7	8	Final
(Ontario) Rachel Homan 🔨	0	0	2	1	0	2	0	0	5
(Nova Scotia) Kaitlyn Jones	0	1	0	0	3	0	0	2	6

==== Draw 12 ====
Friday, October 26, 3:30 pm

Sheet B	1	2	3	4	5	6	7	8	Final
(Alberta) Laura Walker	0	1	0	3	0	1	0	1	6
(Alberta) Casey Scheidegger 🔨	2	0	1	0	1	0	0	0	4

Sheet C	1	2	3	4	5	6	7	8	Final
(Manitoba) Jennifer Jones	0	0	4	0	2	1	0	0	7
(United States) Nina Roth 🔨	1	1	0	1	0	0	3	2	8

Sheet D	1	2	3	4	5	6	7	8	Final
(Scotland) Eve Muirhead 🔨	1	0	0	0	2	0	0	1	4
(Alberta) Chelsea Carey	0	0	1	1	0	1	0	0	3

Sheet E	1	2	3	4	5	6	7	8	9	Final
(Sweden) Anna Hasselborg 🔨	1	0	0	2	0	0	0	1	0	4
(Japan) Satsuki Fujisawa	0	1	0	0	1	1	1	0	1	5

=== Tiebreakers ===
Friday, October 26, 8:00 pm

Sheet A	1	2	3	4	5	6	7	8	Final
(Japan) Satsuki Fujisawa	0	3	0	0	0	0	0	0	3
(Manitoba) Darcy Robertson 🔨	1	0	1	0	1	1	1	1	6

Sheet E	1	2	3	4	5	6	7	8	Final
(Alberta) Laura Walker 🔨	1	0	1	0	0	0	0	X	2
(Manitoba) Tracy Fleury	0	3	0	1	1	2	2	X	9

Saturday, October 27, 8:00 am

Sheet A	1	2	3	4	5	6	7	8	Final
(Alberta) Chelsea Carey	1	0	0	2	0	2	1	X	6
(United States) Nina Roth 🔨	0	1	0	0	2	0	0	X	3

Sheet C	1	2	3	4	5	6	7	8	Final
(Sweden) Anna Hasselborg	0	0	2	2	3	X	X	X	7
(Manitoba) Kerri Einarson 🔨	0	2	0	0	0	X	X	X	2

=== Playoffs ===
Quarterfinals
1	(Alberta) Casey Scheidegger	6
8	(Manitoba) Tracy Fleury	4
4	(Manitoba) Jennifer Jones	4
5	(Sweden) Anna Hasselborg	8
2	(Ontario) Rachel Homan	8
7	(Manitoba) Darcy Robertson	3
3	(Nova Scotia) Kaitlyn Jones	3
6	(Alberta) Chelsea Carey	7

Semifinals
1	(Alberta) Casey Scheidegger	4
5	(Sweden) Anna Hasselborg	8
2	(Ontario) Rachel Homan	6
6	(Alberta) Chelsea Carey	3

Final
5	(Sweden) Anna Hasselborg	8
2	(Ontario) Rachel Homan	7

==== Quarterfinals ====
Saturday, October 27, 4:00 pm

Sheet A	1	2	3	4	5	6	7	8	Final
(Ontario) Rachel Homan 🔨	0	1	0	2	2	1	2	X	8
(Manitoba) Darcy Robertson	1	0	2	0	0	0	0	X	3

Player percentages
(Ontario) Rachel Homan		(Manitoba) Darcy Robertson	
Lisa Weagle	80%	Theresa Cannon	82%
Joanne Courtney	60%	Vanessa Foster	78%
Emma Miskew	78%	Karen Klein	81%
Rachel Homan	63%	Darcy Robertson	62%
Total	70%	Total	76%

Sheet B	1	2	3	4	5	6	7	8	Final
(Manitoba) Jennifer Jones 🔨	0	1	0	1	0	2	0	0	4
(Sweden) Anna Hasselborg	1	0	2	0	1	0	2	2	8

Player percentages
(Manitoba) Jennifer Jones		(Sweden) Anna Hasselborg	
Dawn McEwen	81%	Sofia Mabergs	85%
Jocelyn Peterman	69%	Agnes Knochenhauer	76%
Kaitlyn Lawes	78%	Sara McManus	81%
Jennifer Jones	52%	Anna Hasselborg	74%
Total	70%	Total	79%

Sheet C	1	2	3	4	5	6	7	8	Final
(Alberta) Casey Scheidegger 🔨	0	1	0	2	0	1	0	2	6
(Manitoba) Tracy Fleury	0	0	1	0	2	0	1	0	4

Player percentages
(Alberta) Casey Scheidegger		(Manitoba) Tracy Fleury	
Kristie Moore	75%	Kristin MacCuish	78%
Jessie Haughian	78%	Liz Fyfe	64%
Cary-Anne McTaggart	87%	Selena Njegovan	73%
Casey Scheidegger	77%	Tracy Fleury	65%
Total	79%	Total	70%

Sheet D	1	2	3	4	5	6	7	8	Final
(Nova Scotia) Kaitlyn Jones 🔨	0	2	0	0	0	1	0	X	3
(Alberta) Chelsea Carey	0	0	2	1	2	0	2	X	7

Player percentages
(Nova Scotia) Kaitlyn Jones		(Alberta) Chelsea Carey	
Lindsey Burgess	72%	Heather Rogers	77%
Karlee Burgess	74%	Dana Ferguson	77%
Lauren Lenentine	74%	Sarah Wilkes	76%
Kaitlyn Jones	48%	Chelsea Carey	79%
Total	67%	Total	77%

==== Semifinals ====
Sunday, October 28, 10:00 am

Sheet A	1	2	3	4	5	6	7	8	Final
(Alberta) Casey Scheidegger 🔨	0	2	0	1	0	1	0	X	4
(Sweden) Anna Hasselborg	2	0	1	0	2	0	3	X	8

Player percentages
(Alberta) Casey Scheidegger		(Sweden) Anna Hasselborg	
Kristie Moore	89%	Sofia Mabergs	83%
Jessie Haughian	75%	Agnes Knochenhauer	86%
Cary-Anne McTaggart	70%	Sara McManus	96%
Casey Scheidegger	64%	Anna Hasselborg	81%
Total	75%	Total	87%

Sheet C	1	2	3	4	5	6	7	8	Final
(Ontario) Rachel Homan 🔨	2	0	2	0	1	0	1	X	6
(Alberta) Chelsea Carey	0	1	0	1	0	1	0	X	3

Player percentages
(Ontario) Rachel Homan		(Alberta) Chelsea Carey	
Lisa Weagle	100%	Heather Rogers	84%
Joanne Courtney	86%	Dana Ferguson	77%
Emma Miskew	66%	Sarah Wilkes	71%
Rachel Homan	86%	Chelsea Carey	70%
Total	85%	Total	76%

==== Final ====
Sunday, October 28, 6:00 pm

Sheet C	1	2	3	4	5	6	7	8	Final
(Sweden) Anna Hasselborg	0	1	0	2	0	2	0	3	8
(Ontario) Rachel Homan 🔨	1	0	1	0	3	0	2	0	7

Player percentages
(Sweden) Anna Hasselborg		(Ontario) Rachel Homan	
Sofia Mabergs	84%	Lisa Weagle	70%
Agnes Knochenhauer	80%	Joanne Courtney	78%
Sara McManus	71%	Emma Miskew	77%
Anna Hasselborg	68%	Rachel Homan	62%
Total	76%	Total	72%
