= Liz Fyfe =

Canadian curler (born 1987)

- Curler
- Born: Elisabeth Peters; May 11, 1987 (age 39); Winnipeg, Manitoba, Canada

Team
- Curling club: East St. Paul CC, East St. Paul, MB

Curling career
- Member Association: Manitoba
- Hearts: 5 (2016, 2018, 2019, 2021, 2022)
- Top CTRS ranking: 1st (2021–22)
- Grand Slam victories: 3 (2016 National, 2019 Masters, 2021 Masters)
Medal record
Women's curling
Canadian Olympic Curling Trials
Silver medal – second place	2021 Saskatoon
Representing Canada
World Junior Curling Championships
Bronze medal – third place	2008 Östersund
Representing (Manitoba) Team Wild Card
Scotties Tournament of Hearts
Silver medal – second place	2018 Penticton

Elisabeth Fyfe (born May 11, 1987) is a Canadian curler from Winnipeg, Manitoba. She is a two-time Manitoba Scotties Tournament of Hearts champion. She was also a Canadian Junior Curling Champion having won the 2008 Canadian Junior Championships as a second on the Kaitlyn Lawes team. Fyfe is the daughter of former Brier champion Vic Peters.

== Career ==
=== Juniors (2001–2008) ===
As a junior, Fyfe won the Manitoba Junior championships in 2001 with teammates Allison Nimik, Kristin Loder and Lindsay Titheridge. The team finished with a 4–8 record at the 2001 Canadian Junior Curling Championships. Fyfe tied for third best leads at the competition, curling an average 73% in the round robin. She returned to the Canadian Juniors in 2008, playing second for Kaitlyn Lawes. The team finished round-robin with a 10–2 record which qualified them for the final. Manitoba won the final 7-6 which qualified the team for the 2008 World Junior Curling Championships. They won the bronze medal after defeating Russia in the Bronze Medal Game 9–8.

=== Joining Kerri Einarson (2012–2015) ===
Fyfe joined the Einarson rink in 2012. They did not qualify for the 2013 Manitoba Scotties Tournament of Hearts or play in any Grand Slam's. In the 2013-14 curling season they played in one slam, the 2013 Colonial Square Ladies Classic (not qualifying) and the 2014 Manitoba Scotties Tournament of Hearts, losing in the final to Team Chelsea Carey. The next season the team again lost in the final of Manitoba Hearts, losing this time to Team Jennifer Jones.

=== Breakthrough season and Olympic pre-trials (2015–2018) ===
The 2015-16 curling season would be the breakthrough year for the rink. The team begun the season by winning the Tier 2 event of the 2015 GSOC Tour Challenge. The team finally won the Manitoba Scotties in 2016, and represented Manitoba at the national 2016 Scotties Tournament of Hearts. There, the team would make the playoffs, but would end up losing in the bronze medal game, settling for fourth place. Elsewhere on the World Curling Tour, the team would play in four slams, making it to the semifinals at three events.

The team played in their first Canada Cup in 2016, losing in the semifinals. On the Tour, the team played in five Grand Slams, and would win their first title at the 2016 Boost National. At the 2017 Manitoba Scotties Tournament of Hearts, the team failed to make the playoffs.

The Einarson rink qualified for the 2017 Canadian Olympic Pre-Trials, but would lose in a tiebreaker game. On the tour, the team would win the 2017 Icebreaker at The Granite and would make it to the finals of the 2017 Masters of Curling. They qualified for the first ever Wild Card game at the 2018 Scotties Tournament of Hearts, where they beat Chelsea Carey for the right to represent "Team Wild Card" that year at the Scotties. They finished the round robin and championship pool with a 9–2 record which qualified them for the 1 vs. 2 page playoff game. They lost to Team Manitoba (Jennifer Jones) but rebounded against Nova Scotia's Mary-Anne Arsenault in the semifinal. They couldn't get by Jones in the final, settling for a silver medal. They finished their season with a semifinal finish at the 2018 Players' Championship and a runner-up finish at the 2018 Champions Cup.

=== Tracy Fleury joins the team (2018–2022) ===
Fyfe would stay with Selena Njegovan and Kristin MacCuish for the 2018–19 season but would bring on a new skip, Tracy Fleury for the 2019–2022 Olympic quadrennial. Fleury is from Sudbury and would play as their designated out-of-province curler. The team had a nearly full schedule in Grand Slam events, beginning the season at the Elite 10, where they missed the playoffs after winning just one game. Next, they made it to the quarterfinals of the 2018 Masters, which they followed up by making it to the finals of the 2018 Tour Challenge, where they lost to Rachel Homan. Outside of the Grand Slam tour, they were invited to represent Canada at the second leg of the Curling World Cup, which they finished with a 4–2 record, narrowly missing the final. The following week they were back into a Grand Slam event, the 2018 National, where they won just one game. The following month, the team played in the 2019 Canadian Open, again missing the playoffs. The team found success in provincial playdowns, winning the 2019 Manitoba Scotties Tournament of Hearts defeating her old skip Kerri Einarson 13–7 in the final to represent Manitoba at the 2019 Scotties Tournament of Hearts. A week after provincials, the team played in at the 2019 TSN All-Star Curling Skins Game where they lost to Jennifer Jones by $4,000 in the final. The team did earn $32,500 during the tournament. At the Hearts, Manitoba went 4–3 in pool play, but lost to British Columbia's Sarah Wark rink in a tiebreaker to get into the championship pool, which eliminated the team from contention. Fyfe missed the last event of the season for the team, the 2019 Players' Championship due to her pregnancy. With McDonald stepping in once again, the team had a quarterfinal finish.

McDonald spared at the teams first event of the 2019–20 season as well, the 2019 Hokkaido Bank Curling Classic where the team would finish fourth. In her first event back, the 2019 Cargill Curling Training Centre Icebreaker, the team went undefeated en route to claiming the title. In their next event, Fyfe would again have a spare take her place, this time Jill Officer. The team would finish runner-up to Jennifer Jones. Two weeks later, they played in the 2019 Colonial Square Ladies Classic where they went undefeated until the final where they came up short to Homan. Officer played in Fyfe's place once again at the 2019 Curlers Corner Autumn Gold Curling Classic where her team made it to the semifinals. She rejoined the team for the 2019 Canad Inns Women's Classic where they lost in the quarterfinal. Their next event was the first Grand Slam of the season, the 2019 Masters where they qualified for the playoffs with a 3–1 record. With wins over Elena Stern in the quarterfinals and Anna Hasselborg in the semifinal, Team Fleury made their second Grand Slam final since forming. They would be successful this time, defeating Sayaka Yoshimura to claim the Grand Slam title. The next week, they had a quarterfinal finish at the second Slam of the season, the 2019 Tour Challenge. At the Canada Cup, the Fleury team once again had a successful run, qualifying for the playoffs with a 5–1 record. They downed Chelsea Carey 9–4 in the semifinal before coming up short to Rachel Homan in the final. Team Fleury capped off the 2019 part of the season with a semifinal finish at the 2019 Boost National Grand Slam. This meant they qualified for the playoffs in all ten of the events they played in to start the season. To start 2020, the Fleury rink along with five other Canadian rinks, represented Canada at the 2020 Continental Cup. Team Canada did not have a good week, losing to the European's by fifteen points. They missed the playoffs for the first time during the season when they were knocked out of the triple knockout format at the 2020 Canadian Open. At the 2020 Manitoba Scotties Tournament of Hearts, the provincial championship, Team Fleury lost the semifinal to Jennifer Jones. They did have another chance to qualify for the 2020 Scotties Tournament of Hearts through the Wild Card play in game which they also lost to Jones. It would be the team's last event of the season as both the Players' Championship and the Champions Cup Grand Slam events were cancelled due to the COVID-19 pandemic.

Team Fleury added longtime skip and 2013 Canadian Olympic Curling Trials silver medallist Sherry Middaugh to coach the team for the 2020–21 season. Due to the COVID-19 pandemic in Manitoba, the 2021 provincial championship was cancelled. As the reigning provincials champions Team Kerri Einarson were already qualified for the Scotties as Team Canada, Team Jennifer Jones was given the invitation to represent Manitoba at the 2021 Scotties Tournament of Hearts as they were the 2020 provincial runners-up. However, due to many provinces cancelling their provincial championships as a result of the COVID-19 pandemic in Canada, Curling Canada added three Wild Card teams to the national championship, which were based on the CTRS standings from the 2019–20 season. Because Team Fleury ranked 2nd on the CTRS and kept at least three of their four players together for the 2020–21 season, they got the first Wild Card spot at the 2021 Scotties in Calgary, Alberta. Tracy Fleury would, however, not compete at the Hearts, as she wanted to stay home with her baby daughter, who was diagnosed with infantile spasms, a rare form of epilepsy. In her place was two-time Scotties champion Chelsea Carey who was left without a team for the season. At the Hearts, Carey led the team to a 6–6 eighth-place finish. Fleury returned to skip the team at the 2021 Champions Cup, held in the same Calgary bubble in April 2021. It was the first time Fyfe, Selena Njegovan and Kristin MacCuish had seen her in over a year. At the Champions Cup, Fleury led the team to a 4–0 round robin record before losing in the semifinal to Switzerland's Silvana Tirinzoni. Fleury left the bubble after the event, and was once again replaced by Chelsea Carey for the 2021 Players' Championship. There, Carey led the team to a 2–3 round robin record, missing the playoffs.

With Fleury back fulltime for the 2021–22 season, the team began the season at the 2021 Oakville Labour Day Classic. There, they went a perfect 7–0 to claim the title, defeating Suzanne Birt 8–7 in the final. Two weeks later, they won their second tour event of the season at the 2021 Sherwood Park Women's Curling Classic. After finishing 4–0 through the round robin, they defeated Cory Christensen, Kim Eun-jung, and Kerri Einarson in the quarterfinals, semifinals and final respectively to win their second title of the season. After a quarterfinal finish at the 2021 Curlers Corner Autumn Gold Curling Classic, the team played in the first slam event of the season, the 2021 Masters. In the triple knockout qualifying round, they finished 3–1 and qualified through the B Side. They then defeated Einarson 6–2 in the quarterfinals and topped Alina Kovaleva 8–4 in the semifinals to qualify for their third slam final as a team, where they faced Team Jennifer Jones. After Fleury took an early lead, Jones tied things up in eighth to force an extra end. In the extra, Team Fleury secured the win with a double takeout and defended their Masters title from 2019. At the second Grand Slam of the season, the 2021 National, the team posted undefeated record until they reached the final where they were defeated by Sweden's Anna Hasselborg 9–6 in an extra end.

Then came the 2021 Canadian Olympic Curling Trials, held November 20 to 28 in Saskatoon, Saskatchewan. After their successful start to the 2021–22 season, Team Fleury entered the Trials as the topped ranked women's team. Through the round robin, the team went undefeated with a perfect 8–0 record, becoming only the second women's rink to do so following Chelsea Carey in 2017. This earned them a bye to the Olympic Trials final where they would face Team Jennifer Jones, who they previously defeated in their final round robin game. The team began the game with hammer, but immediately gave up a stolen point. They eventually tied the game after four ends, and later after seven ends 4–4. After a blank in the eighth, Team Fleury earned their first lead of the game with a steal of one in the ninth. In the tenth end, Jennifer Jones had an open hit-and-stick to win the game, however, her shooter rolled too far and she only got one. This sent the game to an extra end where Team Fleury would hold the hammer. On her final shot, Fleury attempted a soft-weight hit on a Jones stone partially buried behind a guard. Her rock, however, curled too much and hit the guard, giving up a steal of one and the game to Team Jones. Team Fleury earned the silver medal from the event.

At the 2022 Manitoba Scotties Tournament of Hearts, the team couldn't rebound from their disappointing finish at the Trials, finishing 5–3 and failing to qualify for the playoff round. Despite this, they still qualified for the 2022 Scotties Tournament of Hearts, again as Wild Card #1 after Curling Canada used the same format from the 2021 event. Upon arrival into Thunder Bay for the event, the team announced that Tracy Fleury had tested positive for COVID-19 and would have to sit out much of the event. Because of this, third Selena Njegovan stepped up to skip the team with alternate Robyn Njegovan coming in to play third. Without Fleury, the team had a dominant performance through their seven games, finishing with a 6–1 record. Fleury then returned for the teams' final round robin game where they picked up another victory to close out the round robin first place in their pool. Despite earning a bye from the elimination games, the team lost the seeding game and then the 3 vs. 4 page playoff game, eliminating them from the event in fourth place.

On March 16, 2022, the team announced they would be parting ways at the end of the 2021–22 season. Fyfe later announced that she would be joining Chelsea Carey's team for the 2022–23 season at second. The team would also include Jolene Campbell at third, Rachel Erickson at lead and alternate Jamie Sinclair.

Team Fleury still had two more events together before parting ways, the 2022 Players' Championship and 2022 Champions Cup Grand Slams. At the Players', the team qualified through the A-side with an undefeated record, earning them the top spot in the playoff round. They then defeated Sweden's Isabella Wranå in the quarterfinals before being eliminated by the Einarson team in the semifinals. At the Champions Cup, Team Fleury went 3–2 in pool play, and then lost in the quarterfinals to Gim Eun-ji.

=== New beginnings (2022–present) ===
The new Carey rink had a strong start to the season, reaching the semifinals of the 2022 Martensville International. After qualifying as the fourth seeds for the 2022 PointsBet Invitational, the team lost their opening game to thirteenth ranked Selena Sturmay and were eliminated. In Grand Slam play, Team Carey played in three events, only qualifying at the 2022 Masters. Fyfe did not play with the team at the Masters, however, being replaced by Laurie St-Georges. At the 2023 Manitoba Scotties Tournament of Hearts, the team lost their first two games and never recovered, finishing 1–4 and failing to reach the championship round. Shortly following the provincial championship, the team announced they would be disbanding.

== Personal life ==
Fyfe is currently a stay-at-home mom. She is married to Kevin Fyfe, and has two daughters, Lucy and Anika.

== Grand Slam record ==
Key
C	Champion
F	Lost in Final
SF	Lost in Semifinal
QF	Lost in Quarterfinals
R16	Lost in the round of 16
Q	Did not advance to playoffs
T2	Played in Tier 2 event
DNP	Did not participate in event
N/A	Not a Grand Slam event that season

Event	2015–16	2016–17	2017–18	2018–19	2019–20	2020–21	2021–22	2022–23
The National	Q	C	Q	Q	SF	N/A	F	Q
Tour Challenge	T2	Q	T2	F	QF	N/A	N/A	Q
Masters	SF	Q	F	QF	C	N/A	C	DNP
Canadian Open	DNP	Q	Q	Q	Q	N/A	N/A	DNP
Players'	SF	DNP	SF	DNP	N/A	Q	SF	DNP
Champions Cup	SF	DNP	F	DNP	N/A	SF	QF	DNP

=== Former events ===
Event	2009–10	2010–11	2011–12	2012–13	2013–14	2014–15	2015–16	2016–17	2017–18	2018–19
Elite 10	N/A	N/A	N/A	N/A	N/A	N/A	N/A	N/A	N/A	Q
Colonial Square	N/A	N/A	N/A	Q	Q	DNP	N/A	N/A	N/A	N/A
Manitoba Liquor & Lotteries	Q	Q	DNP	DNP	DNP	N/A	N/A	N/A	N/A	N/A

== Teams ==
Season	Skip	Third	Second	Lead	Alternate
2007–08	Kaitlyn Lawes	Jenna Loder	Liz Peters	Sarah Wazney	
2008–09	Kerri Flett	Liz Peters	Tamara Bauknecht	Sarah Wazney	
2009–10	Jenna Loder	Liz Peters	Sarah Wazney	Mary Jane McKenzie	
2010–11	Brette Richards	Cheryl Neufeld	Liz Peters	Jillian Sandison	
2012–13	Kerri Einarson	Sara Van Welleghem	Liz Fyfe	Krysten Karwacki	
2013–14	Kerri Einarson	Selena Kaatz	Liz Fyfe	Kristin MacCuish	
2014–15	Kerri Einarson	Selena Kaatz	Liz Fyfe	Kristin MacCuish	
2015–16	Kerri Einarson	Selena Kaatz	Liz Fyfe	Kristin MacCuish	
2016–17	Kerri Einarson	Selena Kaatz	Liz Fyfe	Kristin MacCuish	
2017–18	Kerri Einarson	Selena Kaatz	Liz Fyfe	Kristin MacCuish	
2018–19	Tracy Fleury	Selena Njegovan	Liz Fyfe	Kristin MacCuish	Taylor McDonald
2019–20	Tracy Fleury	Selena Njegovan	Liz Fyfe	Kristin MacCuish	
2020–21	Tracy Fleury	Selena Njegovan	Liz Fyfe	Kristin MacCuish	Chelsea Carey
2021–22	Tracy Fleury	Selena Njegovan	Liz Fyfe	Kristin MacCuish	
2022–23	Chelsea Carey	Jolene Campbell	Liz Fyfe	Rachel Erickson	Jamie Sinclair
