= Katie Spencer (curler) =

Canadian curler

Katie Lynn Spencer (born September 6, 1991, in Winnipeg, Manitoba) is a Canadian curler originally from Sanford, Manitoba. Spencer currently plays on the team skipped by her mother, Barb Spencer.

== Curling career ==
Spencer currently plays on Team Spencer, composed of Barb Spencer (Skip), Katie Spencer (Third), sister Holly Spencer (Second) and Sydney Arnal (Lead). The coach of Team Spencer is Katie's father, Jim Spencer, a former Brier champion. The team competed in the 2015 Manitoba Scotties Tournament of Hearts, losing in the semi-final round to Kerri Einarson.

Spencer competed at the 2019 Manitoba Scotties Tournament of Hearts, again with her mother Barb. Team Spencer failed to make the playoffs, finishing with a record of 3–4.

== Personal life ==
Spencer graduated from the Asper School of Business at the University of Manitoba and is currently employed at a large accounting firm in Winnipeg, Manitoba. She is an avid fisher, and received a Manitoba Master Angler Award in 2014 for catching a 19" Sucker fish on June 1, 2014.

Both her mother Barb and father Jim have been inducted into the Manitoba Curling Hall of Fame.
