= 2022 Canadian Junior Curling Championships =

2022 New Holland Canadian Junior Curling Championships
- Host city: Stratford, Ontario
- Arena: Stratford Rotary Complex
- Dates: March 26 – April 1
- Men's winner: Ontario 1
- Curling club: Whitby CC, Whitby
- Skip: Landan Rooney
- Third: Nathan Steele
- Second: Jacob Jones
- Lead: Austin Snyder
- Alternate: Scott Mitchell
- Coach: Collin Mitchell
- Finalist: Alberta 1 (Tao)
- Women's winner: Nova Scotia 1
- Curling club: Halifax CC, Halifax
- Skip: Taylour Stevens
- Third: Lauren Ferguson
- Second: Alison Umlah
- Lead: Cate Fitzgerald
- Coach: Mary Mattatall
- Finalist: Ontario 1 (Deschenes)

The 2022 New Holland Canadian Junior Curling Championships was held from March 26 to April 1 at the Stratford Rotary Complex in Stratford, Ontario. The winning teams represented Canada at the 2023 World Junior Curling Championships in Füssen, Germany.

This was the second time Stratford hosted the Canadian Junior Curling Championships. The first was in 2016 when Manitoba's Matt Dunstone and Nova Scotia's Mary Fay took home the titles. The 2022 event featured eighteen teams on both the men's and women's sides, each split into two pools of nine. The top three teams from each pool at the end of the round robin advanced to the playoff round. Based on results from the 2019 and 2020 events, certain provinces earned two berths to the championship. Alberta, British Columbia, Manitoba, Newfoundland and Labrador, Ontario and Saskatchewan each earned an extra berth on the men's side, while Alberta, Manitoba, Nova Scotia, Ontario and Quebec got two berths on the women's side.

== Medallists ==
Junior	Gold	Silver	Bronze
Men	Ontario 1 Landan Rooney; Nathan Steele; Jacob Jones; Austin Snyder; Scott Mitchell	Alberta 1 Johnson Tao; Jaedon Neuert; Benjamin Morin; Andrew Nowell	Saskatchewan 1 Daymond Bernath; Bryden Tessier; David Baum; Jack Reid
Women	Nova Scotia 1 Taylour Stevens; Lauren Ferguson; Alison Umlah; Cate Fitzgerald	Ontario 1 Emily Deschenes; Emma Artichuk; Grace Lloyd; Evelyn Robert; Adrienne Belliveau	Alberta 2 Claire Booth; Kaylee Raniseth; Raelyn Helston; Kate Ector

== Men ==
=== Teams ===
The teams are listed as follows:

Province / Territory	Skip	Third	Second	Lead	Alternate	Club(s)
Alberta 1	Johnson Tao	Jaedon Neuert	Benjamin Morin	Andrew Nowell		Saville SC, Edmonton
Alberta 2	Justin Runciman	Steven Leong	Gryffen Algot	Carter Elder	James Ballance	Leduc / Sherwood Park / Ellerslie
British Columbia 1	Connor Deane	Joshua Miki	Mack Ellis	Brenin Moore		Royal City CC, New Westminster
British Columbia 2	Adam Fenton	Alex Duncan-Wu	Sam Husdon	Wesley Wu		Royal City CC, New Westminster
Manitoba 1	Jordon McDonald	Reece Hamm	Elias Huminicki	Alexandre Fontaine	Jayden Rutter	Deer Lodge CC, Winnipeg
Manitoba 2	Aaron Van Ryssel	Peter Albig	Jonah Peterson	Colin Desaulniers	Ronan Peterson	Springfield CC, Springfield
New Brunswick	Rajan Dalrymple	John Siddall	Jacob Nowlan	Cameron Sallaj		Gage / Moncton / Sackville
Newfoundland and Labrador 1	Nathan Young	Sam Follett	Nathan Locke	Ben Stringer		St. John's CC, St. John's
Newfoundland and Labrador 2	Sean O'Leary	Andrew Trickett	Dylan Hancock	Jake Young		St. John's CC, St. John's
Northern Ontario	Dallas Burgess	Jackson Dubinsky	Matt Duizer	Brayden Sinclair		Kakabeka CC, Kakabeka Falls
Northwest Territories	Mason MacNeil	Kaleb Picek	John Voudrach	Kolsen Church		Inuvik CC, Inuvik
Nova Scotia	Nick Mosher	Sean Beland	Evan Hennigar	Aidan MacDonald	Owen McPherson	CFB Halifax CC, Halifax
Ontario 1	Landan Rooney	Nathan Steele	Jacob Jones	Austin Snyder	Scott Mitchell	Whitby CC, Whitby
Ontario 2	Dylan Niepage	Gavin Lydiate	Jayden King	Daniel Del Conte	Kibo Mulima	Guelph CC, Guelph
Prince Edward Island	Chase MacMillan (Fourth)	Mitchell Schut (Skip)	Cruz Pineau	Liam Kelly		Cornwall CC, Cornwall
Quebec	Dimitri Audibert	James Trahan	Raphaël Tremblay	Simon Laroche		Riverbend/Trois-Rivières/Grand-Mère/Lacolle
Saskatchewan 1	Daymond Bernath	Bryden Tessier	David Baum	Jack Reid		Sutherland CC, Saskatoon
Saskatchewan 2	Nathen Pomedli	Braden Fleischhacker	Jayden Bindig	Ethan Desilets		Sutherland CC, Saskatoon

=== Round robin standings ===
Final Round Robin Standings

Key
Teams to Playoffs

Pool A	Skip	W	L	W–L	LSD
Saskatchewan 1	Daymond Bernath	7	1	1–1	495.0
Alberta 1	Johnson Tao	7	1	1–1	673.8
Newfoundland and Labrador 1	Nathan Young	7	1	1–1	852.6
Nova Scotia	Nick Mosher	5	3	–	547.2
Ontario 2	Dylan Niepage	4	4	–	600.5
British Columbia 2	Adam Fenton	3	5	–	698.3
Prince Edward Island	Mitchell Schut	2	6	–	981.4
Manitoba 2	Aaron Van Ryssel	1	7	–	910.7
New Brunswick	Rajan Dalrymple	0	8	–	1417.5

Pool B	Skip	W	L	W–L	LSD
Manitoba 1	Jordon McDonald	7	1	1–0	648.5
Ontario 1	Landan Rooney	7	1	0–1	836.7
British Columbia 1	Connor Deane	6	2	–	503.9
Saskatchewan 2	Nathen Pomedli	5	3	–	626.7
Alberta 2	Justin Runciman	4	4	–	661.1
Quebec	Dimitri Audibert	3	5	1–0	1113.7
Northern Ontario	Dallas Burgess	3	5	0–1	636.7
Newfoundland and Labrador 2	Sean O'Leary	1	7	–	1155.2
Northwest Territories	Mason MacNeil	0	8	–	1503.2

=== Round robin results ===
All draw times are listed in Eastern Time (UTC−04:00).

==== Draw 1 ====
Saturday, March 26, 8:00 am

Sheet A	1	2	3	4	5	6	7	8	9	10	Final
British Columbia 2 (Fenton) 🔨	0	0	3	0	0	2	0	0	1	0	6
Saskatchewan 1 (Bernath)	0	1	0	3	1	0	0	2	0	1	8

Sheet B	1	2	3	4	5	6	7	8	9	10	Final
Manitoba 2 (Van Ryssel) 🔨	1	0	0	0	1	3	3	2	X	X	10
New Brunswick (Dalrymple)	0	0	0	1	0	0	0	0	X	X	1

Sheet C	1	2	3	4	5	6	7	8	9	10	Final
Nova Scotia (Mosher) 🔨	0	0	0	0	1	0	1	1	0	0	3
Newfoundland and Labrador 1 (Young)	0	2	0	1	0	1	0	0	0	1	5

Sheet D	1	2	3	4	5	6	7	8	9	10	Final
Alberta 1 (Tao) 🔨	2	0	1	0	1	0	1	0	0	0	5
Prince Edward Island (Schut)	0	0	0	1	0	1	0	1	1	0	4

Sheet E	1	2	3	4	5	6	7	8	9	10	Final
British Columbia 1 (Deane)	0	2	1	0	0	0	1	0	2	X	6
Saskatchewan 2 (Pomedli) 🔨	0	0	0	0	0	1	0	2	0	X	3

Sheet F	1	2	3	4	5	6	7	8	9	10	Final
Manitoba 1 (McDonald)	2	1	3	0	7	0	2	0	X	X	15
Northwest Territories (MacNeil) 🔨	0	0	0	1	0	1	0	1	X	X	3

Sheet G	1	2	3	4	5	6	7	8	9	10	Final
Northern Ontario (Burgess)	0	4	0	2	0	1	3	3	X	X	13
Newfoundland and Labrador 2 (O'Leary) 🔨	0	0	1	0	1	0	0	0	X	X	2

Sheet H	1	2	3	4	5	6	7	8	9	10	Final
Alberta 2 (Runciman)	0	2	0	0	3	2	0	4	X	X	11
Quebec (Audibert) 🔨	0	0	2	0	0	0	3	0	X	X	5

==== Draw 3 ====
Saturday, March 26, 4:00 pm

Sheet A	1	2	3	4	5	6	7	8	9	10	Final
Manitoba 2 (Van Ryssel)	0	0	0	0	1	0	1	0	X	X	2
Alberta 1 (Tao)	0	2	3	1	0	2	0	1	X	X	9

Sheet B	1	2	3	4	5	6	7	8	9	10	Final
Ontario 2 (Niepage)	0	0	0	2	0	0	1	0	2	X	5
Nova Scotia (Mosher) 🔨	0	2	3	0	1	0	0	2	0	X	8

Sheet C	1	2	3	4	5	6	7	8	9	10	Final
Prince Edward Island (Schut)	1	0	0	1	1	0	0	0	X	X	3
Saskatchewan 1 (Bernath) 🔨	0	2	1	0	0	4	1	1	X	X	9

Sheet D	1	2	3	4	5	6	7	8	9	10	Final
New Brunswick (Dalrymple)	0	1	0	0	1	0	0	1	X	X	3
Newfoundland and Labrador 1 (Young) 🔨	0	0	4	1	0	0	5	0	X	X	10

Sheet E	1	2	3	4	5	6	7	8	9	10	Final
Manitoba 1 (McDonald) 🔨	1	0	1	3	1	0	0	0	4	X	10
Alberta 2 (Runciman)	0	2	0	0	0	0	2	1	0	X	5

Sheet F	1	2	3	4	5	6	7	8	9	10	Final
Ontario 1 (Rooney) 🔨	2	0	0	0	0	0	2	1	0	X	5
Northern Ontario (Burgess)	0	0	0	0	1	1	0	0	1	X	3

Sheet G	1	2	3	4	5	6	7	8	9	10	Final
Quebec (Audibert)	0	3	0	0	0	0	0	1	X	X	4
Saskatchewan 2 (Pomedli) 🔨	4	0	0	0	1	2	2	0	X	X	9

Sheet H	1	2	3	4	5	6	7	8	9	10	Final
Northwest Territories (MacNeil) 🔨	0	0	0	2	0	0	0	0	X	X	2
Newfoundland and Labrador 2 (O'Leary)	3	1	2	0	2	0	1	4	X	X	13

==== Draw 5 ====
Sunday, March 27, 8:00 am

Sheet A	1	2	3	4	5	6	7	8	9	10	Final
Northwest Territories (MacNeil)	0	1	1	0	1	0	0	1	X	X	4
Quebec (Audibert) 🔨	2	0	0	3	0	3	1	0	X	X	9

Sheet B	1	2	3	4	5	6	7	8	9	10	11	Final
Alberta 2 (Runciman) 🔨	1	0	0	1	0	1	0	3	1	0	1	8
British Columbia 1 (Deane)	0	2	2	0	0	0	1	0	0	2	0	7

Sheet C	1	2	3	4	5	6	7	8	9	10	Final
Ontario 1 (Rooney) 🔨	0	1	0	2	0	2	0	0	1	0	6
Manitoba 1 (McDonald)	0	0	1	0	2	0	1	1	0	2	7

Sheet D	1	2	3	4	5	6	7	8	9	10	Final
Saskatchewan 2 (Pomedli)	1	0	1	0	1	0	2	0	3	X	8
Northern Ontario (Burgess) 🔨	0	1	0	1	0	1	0	2	0	X	5

Sheet E	1	2	3	4	5	6	7	8	9	10	Final
New Brunswick (Dalrymple) 🔨	2	0	0	1	0	0	0	0	X	X	3
Prince Edward Island (Schut)	0	0	1	0	1	4	2	1	X	X	9

Sheet F	1	2	3	4	5	6	7	8	9	10	Final
Alberta 1 (Tao) 🔨	2	0	0	0	1	0	0	2	0	1	6
British Columbia 2 (Fenton)	0	0	1	0	0	2	0	0	2	0	5

Sheet G	1	2	3	4	5	6	7	8	9	10	Final
Ontario 2 (Niepage)	1	0	0	1	0	0	1	0	0	1	4
Manitoba 2 (Van Ryssel) 🔨	0	0	0	0	1	0	0	1	1	0	3

Sheet H	1	2	3	4	5	6	7	8	9	10	Final
Saskatchewan 1 (Bernath) 🔨	2	0	0	0	1	0	2	3	1	X	9
Nova Scotia (Mosher)	0	1	1	1	0	1	0	0	0	X	4

==== Draw 7 ====
Sunday, March 27, 4:00 pm

Sheet A	1	2	3	4	5	6	7	8	9	10	Final
Saskatchewan 2 (Pomedli)	0	0	0	2	0	0	1	0	0	X	3
Ontario 1 (Rooney)	0	1	0	0	3	0	0	2	1	X	7

Sheet B	1	2	3	4	5	6	7	8	9	10	Final
Quebec (Audibert)	1	0	1	0	0	1	1	2	3	X	9
Newfoundland and Labrador 2 (O'Leary) 🔨	0	3	0	1	2	0	0	0	0	X	6

Sheet C	1	2	3	4	5	6	7	8	9	10	Final
Alberta 2 (Runciman)	1	0	4	1	0	3	1	0	X	X	10
Northwest Territories (MacNeil)	0	1	0	0	1	0	0	1	X	X	3

Sheet D	1	2	3	4	5	6	7	8	9	10	Final
Manitoba 1 (McDonald)	1	0	1	0	0	1	0	1	0	X	4
British Columbia 1 (Deane)	0	1	0	2	1	0	3	0	4	X	11

Sheet E	1	2	3	4	5	6	7	8	9	10	Final
Saskatchewan 1 (Bernath) 🔨	0	0	1	0	0	2	0	3	2	X	8
Ontario 2 (Niepage)	0	0	0	1	0	0	1	0	0	X	2

Sheet F	1	2	3	4	5	6	7	8	9	10	Final
Prince Edward Island (Schut)	0	0	0	0	1	0	0	1	0	0	2
Newfoundland and Labrador 1 (Young) 🔨	0	0	0	1	0	2	0	0	0	1	4

Sheet G	1	2	3	4	5	6	7	8	9	10	Final
Alberta 1 (Tao) 🔨	2	0	1	2	2	2	0	3	X	X	12
New Brunswick (Dalrymple)	0	2	0	0	0	0	1	0	X	X	3

Sheet H	1	2	3	4	5	6	7	8	9	10	Final
Manitoba 2 (Van Ryssel)	0	0	0	0	0	2	1	1	0	X	4
British Columbia 2 (Fenton) 🔨	0	4	0	1	3	0	0	0	1	X	9

==== Draw 9 ====
Monday, March 28, 9:00 am

Sheet A	1	2	3	4	5	6	7	8	9	10	Final
Newfoundland and Labrador 1 (Young)	1	1	1	3	0	2	4	0	X	X	12
Manitoba 2 (Van Ryssel) 🔨	0	0	0	0	1	0	0	0	X	X	1

Sheet B	1	2	3	4	5	6	7	8	9	10	Final
New Brunswick (Dalrymple)	0	1	0	0	0	1	0	0	X	X	2
Saskatchewan 1 (Bernath) 🔨	2	0	3	1	1	0	2	1	X	X	10

Sheet C	1	2	3	4	5	6	7	8	9	10	Final
British Columbia 2 (Fenton) 🔨	1	0	1	0	0	1	1	0	0	X	4
Nova Scotia (Mosher)	0	1	0	2	1	0	0	0	3	X	7

Sheet D	1	2	3	4	5	6	7	8	9	10	Final
Ontario 2 (Niepage) 🔨	0	1	0	1	1	0	0	0	0	X	3
Alberta 1 (Tao)	1	0	1	0	0	2	0	1	2	X	7

Sheet E	1	2	3	4	5	6	7	8	9	10	Final
Newfoundland and Labrador 2 (O'Leary) 🔨	0	3	0	1	0	0	0	1	X	X	5
Manitoba 1 (McDonald)	1	0	3	0	4	1	2	0	X	X	11

Sheet F	1	2	3	4	5	6	7	8	9	10	Final
Northwest Territories (MacNeil)	0	0	0	0	0	0	0	0	X	X	0
Saskatchewan 2 (Pomedli) 🔨	3	2	0	2	3	2	3	1	X	X	16

Sheet G	1	2	3	4	5	6	7	8	9	10	Final
British Columbia 1 (Deane) 🔨	3	0	2	0	2	0	0	1	0	1	9
Northern Ontario (Burgess)	0	2	0	1	0	1	0	0	2	0	6

Sheet H	1	2	3	4	5	6	7	8	9	10	Final
Ontario 1 (Rooney) 🔨	1	1	0	0	0	0	2	0	0	2	6
Alberta 2 (Runciman)	0	0	0	1	2	1	0	1	0	0	5

==== Draw 11 ====
Monday, March 28, 7:00 pm

Sheet A	1	2	3	4	5	6	7	8	9	10	Final
Nova Scotia (Mosher) 🔨	3	2	0	1	0	0	1	0	2	X	9
New Brunswick (Dalrymple)	0	0	1	0	1	1	0	2	0	X	5

Sheet B	1	2	3	4	5	6	7	8	9	10	Final
British Columbia 2 (Fenton) 🔨	1	0	0	1	0	0	0	1	0	X	3
Ontario 2 (Niepage)	0	1	0	0	0	1	1	0	3	X	6

Sheet C	1	2	3	4	5	6	7	8	9	10	Final
Manitoba 2 (Van Ryssel) 🔨	1	0	0	0	1	0	2	0	0	X	4
Prince Edward Island (Schut)	0	1	1	0	0	2	0	2	2	X	8

Sheet D	1	2	3	4	5	6	7	8	9	10	Final
Newfoundland and Labrador 1 (Young) 🔨	2	0	0	0	1	0	1	0	2	X	6
Saskatchewan 1 (Bernath)	0	1	2	2	0	3	0	1	0	X	9

Sheet E	1	2	3	4	5	6	7	8	9	10	Final
Northern Ontario (Burgess) 🔨	3	1	4	3	0	2	0	1	X	X	14
Northwest Territories (MacNeil)	0	0	0	0	1	0	2	0	X	X	3

Sheet F	1	2	3	4	5	6	7	8	9	10	Final
British Columbia 1 (Deane) 🔨	0	1	0	0	1	0	1	1	X	X	4
Ontario 1 (Rooney)	3	0	2	1	0	3	0	0	X	X	9

Sheet G	1	2	3	4	5	6	7	8	9	10	Final
Manitoba 1 (McDonald) 🔨	5	0	0	0	0	2	0	1	X	X	8
Quebec (Audibert)	0	0	1	1	0	0	1	0	X	X	3

Sheet H	1	2	3	4	5	6	7	8	9	10	Final
Newfoundland and Labrador 2 (O'Leary) 🔨	0	0	1	0	0	2	0	1	0	X	4
Saskatchewan 2 (Pomedli)	0	1	0	2	4	0	0	0	0	X	7

==== Draw 13 ====
Tuesday, March 29, 2:00 pm

Sheet A	1	2	3	4	5	6	7	8	9	10	Final
Quebec (Audibert) 🔨	0	1	0	0	3	0	0	0	1	X	5
British Columbia 1 (Deane)	0	0	3	3	0	2	0	1	0	X	9

Sheet B	1	2	3	4	5	6	7	8	9	10	Final
Newfoundland and Labrador 2 (O'Leary)	0	0	0	0	0	1	1	0	X	X	2
Alberta 2 (Runciman) 🔨	2	2	1	0	2	0	0	2	X	X	9

Sheet C	1	2	3	4	5	6	7	8	9	10	Final
Northwest Territories (MacNeil)	0	0	0	0	0	1	0	1	X	X	2
Ontario 1 (Rooney) 🔨	1	3	3	2	1	0	1	0	X	X	11

Sheet D	1	2	3	4	5	6	7	8	9	10	Final
Northern Ontario (Burgess)	1	1	0	1	0	2	0	1	0	X	6
Manitoba 1 (McDonald) 🔨	0	0	2	0	6	0	0	0	1	X	9

Sheet E	1	2	3	4	5	6	7	8	9	10	Final
Prince Edward Island (Schut)	0	0	0	4	0	1	0	1	0	0	6
British Columbia 2 (Fenton) 🔨	0	1	1	0	1	0	2	0	0	2	7

Sheet F	1	2	3	4	5	6	7	8	9	10	Final
Newfoundland and Labrador 1 (Young) 🔨	0	2	1	0	0	1	2	1	X	X	7
Alberta 1 (Tao)	0	0	0	1	0	0	0	0	X	X	1

Sheet G	1	2	3	4	5	6	7	8	9	10	Final
New Brunswick (Dalrymple)	0	0	0	0	0	0	2	0	1	X	3
Ontario 2 (Niepage) 🔨	0	0	0	2	0	2	0	2	0	X	6

Sheet H	1	2	3	4	5	6	7	8	9	10	Final
Nova Scotia (Mosher)	0	2	0	0	1	0	1	5	X	X	9
Manitoba 2 (Van Ryssel) 🔨	0	0	0	1	0	1	0	0	X	X	2

==== Draw 15 ====
Wednesday, March 30, 9:00 am

Sheet A	1	2	3	4	5	6	7	8	9	10	Final
Ontario 2 (Niepage)	0	0	2	0	1	0	0	1	0	0	4
Newfoundland and Labrador 1 (Young) 🔨	1	0	0	0	0	2	1	0	2	1	7

Sheet B	1	2	3	4	5	6	7	8	9	10	Final
Nova Scotia (Mosher) 🔨	0	3	1	0	0	1	0	2	0	X	7
Prince Edward Island (Schut)	1	0	0	1	2	0	1	0	1	X	6

Sheet C	1	2	3	4	5	6	7	8	9	10	Final
Saskatchewan 1 (Bernath)	0	0	1	0	0	0	3	1	0	X	5
Alberta 1 (Tao) 🔨	0	1	0	2	2	2	0	0	2	X	9

Sheet D	1	2	3	4	5	6	7	8	9	10	11	Final
British Columbia 2 (Fenton) 🔨	1	0	2	1	0	0	3	0	2	0	1	10
New Brunswick (Dalrymple)	0	1	0	0	1	2	0	2	0	3	0	9

Sheet E	1	2	3	4	5	6	7	8	9	10	Final
Ontario 1 (Rooney) 🔨	0	0	3	2	1	2	0	0	X	X	8
Newfoundland and Labrador 2 (O'Leary)	0	1	0	0	0	0	1	0	X	X	2

Sheet F	1	2	3	4	5	6	7	8	9	10	Final
Northern Ontario (Burgess) 🔨	1	0	0	1	0	0	1	0	2	0	5
Quebec (Audibert)	0	2	1	0	1	1	0	1	0	1	7

Sheet G	1	2	3	4	5	6	7	8	9	10	Final
Saskatchewan 2 (Pomedli)	0	2	3	2	0	0	0	2	0	1	10
Alberta 2 (Runciman) 🔨	1	0	0	0	1	1	1	0	3	0	7

Sheet H	1	2	3	4	5	6	7	8	9	10	Final
British Columbia 1 (Deane)	4	0	3	2	2	2	1	0	X	X	14
Northwest Territories (MacNeil) 🔨	0	1	0	0	0	0	0	1	X	X	2

==== Draw 17 ====
Wednesday, March 30, 7:00 pm

Sheet A	1	2	3	4	5	6	7	8	9	10	Final
Alberta 2 (Runciman)	0	0	3	0	0	2	0	3	0	0	8
Northern Ontario (Burgess) 🔨	1	3	0	2	0	0	1	0	1	1	9

Sheet B	1	2	3	4	5	6	7	8	9	10	Final
Saskatchewan 2 (Pomedli)	0	0	0	1	0	0	0	2	0	X	3
Manitoba 1 (McDonald) 🔨	0	2	1	0	2	1	0	0	1	X	7

Sheet C	1	2	3	4	5	6	7	8	9	10	Final
Newfoundland and Labrador 2 (O'Leary) 🔨	0	0	1	1	0	2	0	1	1	0	6
British Columbia 1 (Deane)	0	2	0	0	1	0	2	0	0	2	7

Sheet D	1	2	3	4	5	6	7	8	9	10	Final
Quebec (Audibert) 🔨	0	0	0	0	0	2	0	3	0	X	5
Ontario 1 (Rooney)	0	2	4	0	2	0	1	0	1	X	10

Sheet E	1	2	3	4	5	6	7	8	9	10	Final
Alberta 1 (Tao) 🔨	1	0	0	2	1	0	3	2	X	X	9
Nova Scotia (Mosher)	0	2	0	0	0	0	0	0	X	X	2

Sheet F	1	2	3	4	5	6	7	8	9	10	Final
Saskatchewan 1 (Bernath) 🔨	1	0	3	0	0	2	1	0	X	X	7
Manitoba 2 (Van Ryssel)	0	1	0	0	1	0	0	1	X	X	3

Sheet G	1	2	3	4	5	6	7	8	9	10	Final
Newfoundland and Labrador 1 (Young)	0	2	0	1	0	2	1	2	X	X	8
British Columbia 2 (Fenton) 🔨	1	0	0	0	1	0	0	0	X	X	2

Sheet H	1	2	3	4	5	6	7	8	9	10	Final
Prince Edward Island (Schut)	0	0	1	0	1	0	0	2	0	X	4
Ontario 2 (Niepage) 🔨	0	2	0	2	0	0	3	0	1	X	8

=== Playoffs ===
Qualification games
B2	Ontario 1	10
A3	Newfoundland and Labrador 1	6
A2	Alberta 1	5
B3	British Columbia 1	4

Semifinals
A1	Saskatchewan 1	4
B2	Ontario 1	8
B1	Manitoba 1	4
A2	Alberta 1	5

Final
B2	Ontario 1	10
A2	Alberta 1	4
Bronze medal game
A1	Saskatchewan 1	11
B1	Manitoba 1	5

==== Quarterfinals ====
Thursday, March 31, 7:00 pm

Sheet B	1	2	3	4	5	6	7	8	9	10	Final
Ontario 1 (Rooney) 🔨	0	1	0	0	4	4	0	1	0	X	10
Newfoundland and Labrador 1 (Young)	0	0	2	1	0	0	2	0	1	X	6

Player percentages
Ontario 1		Newfoundland and Labrador 1	
Austin Snyder	89%	Ben Stringer	89%
Jacob Jones	80%	Nathan Locke	80%
Nathan Steele	86%	Sam Follet	75%
Landan Rooney	70%	Nathan Young	77%
Total	81%	Total	80%

Sheet D	1	2	3	4	5	6	7	8	9	10	Final
Alberta 1 (Tao) 🔨	1	0	2	1	0	0	0	1	0	0	5
British Columbia 1 (Deane)	0	1	0	0	2	0	0	0	1	0	4

==== Semifinals ====
Friday, April 1, 9:00 am

Sheet A	1	2	3	4	5	6	7	8	9	10	Final
Manitoba 1 (McDonald) 🔨	0	1	0	0	0	2	0	1	0	0	4
Alberta 1 (Tao)	0	0	1	0	1	0	1	0	1	1	5

Sheet C	1	2	3	4	5	6	7	8	9	10	Final
Saskatchewan 1 (Bernath) 🔨	0	0	2	0	1	0	0	0	1	X	4
Ontario 1 (Rooney)	0	2	0	2	0	0	1	3	0	X	8

==== Bronze medal game ====
Friday, April 1, 2:30 pm

Sheet D	1	2	3	4	5	6	7	8	9	10	Final
Saskatchewan 1 (Bernath) 🔨	0	4	0	2	2	0	1	0	2	X	11
Manitoba 1 (McDonald)	0	0	2	0	0	1	0	2	0	X	5

==== Final ====
Friday, April 1, 2:30 pm

Sheet B	1	2	3	4	5	6	7	8	9	10	Final
Ontario 1 (Rooney) 🔨	0	3	0	2	1	0	1	0	3	X	10
Alberta 1 (Tao)	0	0	1	0	0	2	0	1	0	X	4

Player percentages
Ontario 1		Alberta 1	
Austin Snyder	83%	Andrew Nowell	85%
Jacob Jones	79%	Benjamin Morin	81%
Nathan Steele	76%	Jaedon Neuert	82%
Landan Rooney	86%	Johnson Tao	63%
Total	81%	Total	77%

== Women ==
=== Teams ===
The teams are listed as follows:

Province / Territory	Skip	Third	Second	Lead	Alternate	Club(s)
Alberta 1	Serena Gray-Withers	Zoe Cinnamon	Brianna Cullen	Anna Munroe		Saville SC, Edmonton
Alberta 2	Claire Booth	Kaylee Raniseth	Raelyn Helston	Kate Ector		Calgary CC, Calgary
British Columbia	Holly Hafeli	Jorja Kopytko	Hannah O'Neil	Natalie Hafeli	Eryn Czirfusz	Kamloops CC, Kamloops
Manitoba 1	Tansy Tober	Caitlin Kostna	Lexa Sigurdson	Stephanie Feelus		Fort Garry CC, Winnipeg
Manitoba 2	Morgan Maguet	Kylie Lippens	Lauren Evason	Danica Metcalfe		East St. Paul CC, East St. Paul
New Brunswick	Celia Evans	Brooke Tracy	Julia Evans	Sierra Tracy	Marlise Carter	Gage G&CC, Oromocto
Newfoundland and Labrador	Mackenzie Mitchell	Katie Follett	Sarah Chaytor	Kate Paterson		St. John's CC, St. John's
Northern Ontario	Katy Lukowich	Jamie Smith	Lauren Rajala	Katie Shaw		Curl Sudbury, Sudbury
Northwest Territories	Cassie Rogers	Chasity O'Keefe	Kali Skauge	Grace Twa	Ella Skauge	Yellowknife CC, Yellowknife
Nova Scotia 1	Taylour Stevens	Lauren Ferguson	Alison Umlah	Cate Fitzgerald		Halifax CC, Halifax
Nova Scotia 2	Sophie Blades	Kate Weissent	Stephanie Atherton	Alexis Cluney		Chester CC, Chester
Ontario 1	Emily Deschenes	Emma Artichuk	Grace Lloyd	Evelyn Robert	Adrienne Belliveau	Rideau CC, Ottawa
Ontario 2	Rachel Steele	Grace Cave	Jill Uniacke	Sadie McCutcheon		High Park Club, Toronto
Prince Edward Island	Rachel MacLean	Sydney Howatt	Lexie Murray	Abby Barker		Cornwall CC, Cornwall
Quebec 1	Lauren Cheal	Alexia Perron	Jessie Sutherland	Leah Andrews		Lennoxville / Rivière-du-Loup
Quebec 2	Jolianne Fortin	Emy Lafrance	Megan Lafrance	Mégane Fortin		CC Kénogami, Jonquière
Saskatchewan	Madison Kleiter	Kya Kennedy	Rianna Kish	Hanna Johnson		Sutherland CC, Saskatoon
Yukon	Bayly Scoffin	Neizha Snider	Taylor Legge	Dannika Mikkelsen		Whitehorse CC, Whitehorse

=== Round robin standings ===
Final Round Robin Standings

Key
Teams to Playoffs

Pool A	Skip	W	L	W–L
Northern Ontario	Katy Lukowich	7	1	–
New Brunswick	Celia Evans	5	3	2–0
Alberta 1	Serena Gray-Withers	5	3	1–1
Manitoba 1	Tansy Tober	5	3	0–2
Prince Edward Island	Rachel MacLean	4	4	1–0
Newfoundland and Labrador	Mackenzie Mitchell	4	4	0–1
Nova Scotia 2	Sophie Blades	3	5	–
Quebec 2	Jolianne Fortin	2	6	–
Northwest Territories	Cassie Rogers	1	7	–

Pool B	Skip	W	L	W–L
Nova Scotia 1	Taylour Stevens	8	0	–
Ontario 1	Emily Deschenes	6	2	–
Alberta 2	Claire Booth	5	3	1–0
Saskatchewan	Madison Kleiter	5	3	0–1
British Columbia	Holly Hafeli	4	4	1–0
Ontario 2	Rachel Steele	4	4	0–1
Quebec 1	Lauren Cheal	2	6	–
Manitoba 2	Morgan Maguet	1	7	1–0
Yukon	Bayly Scoffin	1	7	0–1

=== Round robin results ===
All draw times are listed in Eastern Time (UTC−04:00).

==== Draw 2 ====
Saturday, March 26, 12:00 pm

Sheet A	1	2	3	4	5	6	7	8	9	10	Final
Quebec 2 (Fortin) 🔨	1	0	0	1	0	1	0	0	X	X	3
Alberta 1 (Gray-Withers)	0	4	1	0	1	0	3	4	X	X	13

Sheet B	1	2	3	4	5	6	7	8	9	10	Final
Nova Scotia 2 (Blades) 🔨	0	1	1	0	1	0	4	0	1	X	8
Northwest Territories (Rogers)	0	0	0	3	0	1	0	1	0	X	5

Sheet C	1	2	3	4	5	6	7	8	9	10	Final
Northern Ontario (Lukowich) 🔨	0	3	1	0	0	0	2	0	2	X	8
Manitoba 1 (Tober)	0	0	0	1	2	1	0	0	0	X	4

Sheet D	1	2	3	4	5	6	7	8	9	10	Final
New Brunswick (Evans)	0	1	0	1	0	1	0	0	0	X	3
Newfoundland and Labrador (Mitchell) 🔨	3	0	1	0	2	0	1	1	1	X	9

Sheet E	1	2	3	4	5	6	7	8	9	10	Final
Quebec 1 (Cheal) 🔨	1	0	0	0	0	0	0	0	2	X	3
Alberta 2 (Booth)	0	2	0	1	1	1	1	1	0	X	7

Sheet F	1	2	3	4	5	6	7	8	9	10	Final
Nova Scotia 1 (Stevens) 🔨	2	0	1	2	1	4	0	1	X	X	11
Yukon (Scoffin)	0	2	0	0	0	0	1	0	X	X	3

Sheet G	1	2	3	4	5	6	7	8	9	10	Final
Saskatchewan (Kleiter) 🔨	3	0	0	2	1	1	0	0	0	3	10
Manitoba 2 (Maguet)	0	1	0	0	0	0	1	2	3	0	7

Sheet H	1	2	3	4	5	6	7	8	9	10	Final
British Columbia (Hafeli) 🔨	2	0	0	1	1	0	4	0	0	X	8
Ontario 1 (Deschenes)	0	3	1	0	0	1	0	5	1	X	11

==== Draw 4 ====
Saturday, March 26, 8:00 pm

Sheet A	1	2	3	4	5	6	7	8	9	10	Final
Nova Scotia 2 (Blades)	0	2	0	2	0	2	0	1	0	X	7
New Brunswick (Evans) 🔨	1	0	3	0	2	0	3	0	2	X	11

Sheet B	1	2	3	4	5	6	7	8	9	10	Final
Prince Edward Island (MacLean)	0	1	0	0	2	0	1	0	2	X	6
Northern Ontario (Lukowich) 🔨	2	0	0	2	0	3	0	2	0	X	9

Sheet C	1	2	3	4	5	6	7	8	9	10	Final
Newfoundland and Labrador (Mitchell)	1	0	2	0	3	0	0	1	4	X	11
Alberta 1 (Gray-Withers) 🔨	0	2	0	2	0	1	0	0	0	X	5

Sheet D	1	2	3	4	5	6	7	8	9	10	11	Final
Northwest Territories (Rogers)	1	0	0	0	0	0	0	1	1	3	0	6
Manitoba 1 (Tober) 🔨	0	0	2	0	0	1	3	0	0	0	2	8

Sheet E	1	2	3	4	5	6	7	8	9	10	Final
Nova Scotia 1 (Stevens)	0	3	0	0	4	0	2	1	2	X	12
British Columbia (Hafeli) 🔨	1	0	2	2	0	1	0	0	0	X	6

Sheet F	1	2	3	4	5	6	7	8	9	10	Final
Ontario 2 (Steele)	0	0	0	0	0	1	1	0	2	0	4
Saskatchewan (Kleiter) 🔨	0	0	0	0	3	0	0	1	0	1	5

Sheet G	1	2	3	4	5	6	7	8	9	10	Final
Ontario 1 (Deschenes)	2	0	3	1	0	0	2	1	1	X	10
Alberta 2 (Booth) 🔨	0	1	0	0	2	0	0	0	0	X	3

Sheet H	1	2	3	4	5	6	7	8	9	10	Final
Yukon (Scoffin)	0	0	0	1	0	1	0	0	X	X	2
Manitoba 2 (Maguet) 🔨	1	1	1	0	1	0	3	2	X	X	9

==== Draw 6 ====
Sunday, March 27, 12:00 pm

Sheet A	1	2	3	4	5	6	7	8	9	10	Final
Yukon (Scoffin)	1	2	0	0	0	0	1	0	X	X	4
Ontario 1 (Deschenes) 🔨	0	0	1	3	3	3	0	3	X	X	13

Sheet B	1	2	3	4	5	6	7	8	9	10	Final
British Columbia (Hafeli) 🔨	0	0	3	0	1	0	2	1	1	X	8
Quebec 1 (Cheal)	1	1	0	0	0	1	0	0	0	X	3

Sheet C	1	2	3	4	5	6	7	8	9	10	Final
Ontario 2 (Steele)	0	2	1	0	0	4	0	2	0	X	9
Nova Scotia 1 (Stevens) 🔨	2	0	0	3	4	0	4	0	1	X	14

Sheet D	1	2	3	4	5	6	7	8	9	10	Final
Alberta 2 (Booth) 🔨	2	0	1	0	1	0	0	0	2	2	8
Saskatchewan (Kleiter)	0	1	0	2	0	1	1	1	0	0	6

Sheet E	1	2	3	4	5	6	7	8	9	10	Final
Northwest Territories (Rogers)	0	0	1	0	1	0	1	0	X	X	3
Newfoundland and Labrador (Mitchell) 🔨	2	0	0	3	0	1	0	3	X	X	9

Sheet F	1	2	3	4	5	6	7	8	9	10	Final
New Brunswick (Evans) 🔨	1	0	0	2	0	4	0	1	0	1	9
Quebec 2 (Fortin)	0	0	1	0	1	0	2	0	3	0	7

Sheet G	1	2	3	4	5	6	7	8	9	10	Final
Prince Edward Island (MacLean)	0	0	2	0	2	1	0	0	2	1	8
Nova Scotia 2 (Blades) 🔨	0	0	0	2	0	0	1	3	0	0	6

Sheet H	1	2	3	4	5	6	7	8	9	10	11	Final
Alberta 1 (Gray-Withers) 🔨	1	0	0	0	3	0	2	0	2	1	1	10
Northern Ontario (Lukowich)	0	3	1	3	0	1	0	1	0	0	0	9

==== Draw 8 ====
Sunday, March 27, 8:00 pm

Sheet A	1	2	3	4	5	6	7	8	9	10	Final
Alberta 2 (Booth)	0	2	0	0	0	2	0	0	0	X	4
Ontario 2 (Steele) 🔨	1	0	1	0	2	0	1	2	1	X	8

Sheet B	1	2	3	4	5	6	7	8	9	10	Final
Ontario 1 (Deschenes) 🔨	0	1	1	0	2	0	3	2	0	X	9
Manitoba 2 (Maguet)	1	0	0	1	0	1	0	0	1	X	4

Sheet C	1	2	3	4	5	6	7	8	9	10	Final
British Columbia (Hafeli)	0	0	1	0	0	0	2	2	0	X	5
Yukon (Scoffin) 🔨	1	1	0	2	1	3	0	0	3	X	11

Sheet D	1	2	3	4	5	6	7	8	9	10	Final
Nova Scotia 1 (Stevens) 🔨	1	0	2	0	3	1	3	0	1	X	11
Quebec 1 (Cheal)	0	1	0	1	0	0	0	3	0	X	5

Sheet E	1	2	3	4	5	6	7	8	9	10	Final
Alberta 1 (Gray-Withers) 🔨	2	0	2	0	0	0	2	0	0	1	7
Prince Edward Island (MacLean)	0	1	0	1	0	1	0	3	0	0	6

Sheet F	1	2	3	4	5	6	7	8	9	10	Final
Newfoundland and Labrador (Mitchell)	0	3	1	1	0	0	1	0	0	X	6
Manitoba 1 (Tober) 🔨	2	0	0	0	0	3	0	2	2	X	9

Sheet G	1	2	3	4	5	6	7	8	9	10	Final
New Brunswick (Evans) 🔨	1	1	0	0	0	3	0	2	0	0	7
Northwest Territories (Rogers)	0	0	1	3	1	0	2	0	0	1	8

Sheet H	1	2	3	4	5	6	7	8	9	10	Final
Nova Scotia 2 (Blades)	0	1	0	0	0	1	2	0	0	2	6
Quebec 2 (Fortin) 🔨	0	0	0	0	0	0	0	1	1	0	2

==== Draw 10 ====
Monday, March 28, 2:00 pm

Sheet A	1	2	3	4	5	6	7	8	9	10	Final
Manitoba 1 (Tober)	1	0	1	3	1	1	2	0	X	X	9
Nova Scotia 2 (Blades) 🔨	0	2	0	0	0	0	0	1	X	X	3

Sheet B	1	2	3	4	5	6	7	8	9	10	Final
Northwest Territories (Rogers) 🔨	0	0	0	0	3	0	0	1	0	0	4
Alberta 1 (Gray-Withers)	1	0	1	0	0	2	0	0	0	1	5

Sheet C	1	2	3	4	5	6	7	8	9	10	Final
Quebec 2 (Fortin) 🔨	1	1	1	0	1	0	0	0	X	X	4
Northern Ontario (Lukowich)	0	0	0	3	0	3	3	3	X	X	12

Sheet D	1	2	3	4	5	6	7	8	9	10	Final
Prince Edward Island (MacLean) 🔨	0	0	0	0	0	0	2	0	1	X	3
New Brunswick (Evans)	0	2	1	1	0	1	0	2	0	X	7

Sheet E	1	2	3	4	5	6	7	8	9	10	Final
Manitoba 2 (Maguet)	0	0	1	0	1	2	0	0	X	X	4
Nova Scotia 1 (Stevens) 🔨	2	0	0	2	0	0	4	3	X	X	11

Sheet F	1	2	3	4	5	6	7	8	9	10	Final
Yukon (Scoffin)	0	0	0	0	1	0	1	0	X	X	2
Alberta 2 (Booth) 🔨	2	3	1	1	0	3	0	1	X	X	11

Sheet G	1	2	3	4	5	6	7	8	9	10	Final
Quebec 1 (Cheal) 🔨	1	0	1	0	1	1	0	0	1	0	5
Saskatchewan (Kleiter)	0	2	0	1	0	0	0	2	0	2	7

Sheet H	1	2	3	4	5	6	7	8	9	10	Final
Ontario 2 (Steele)	0	1	0	1	0	2	1	0	2	0	7
British Columbia (Hafeli) 🔨	1	0	3	0	1	0	0	2	0	1	8

==== Draw 12 ====
Tuesday, March 29, 9:00 am

Sheet A	1	2	3	4	5	6	7	8	9	10	Final
Northern Ontario (Lukowich) 🔨	1	0	0	5	1	2	0	3	X	X	12
Northwest Territories (Rogers)	0	1	1	0	0	0	1	0	X	X	3

Sheet B	1	2	3	4	5	6	7	8	9	10	Final
Quebec 2 (Fortin) 🔨	1	0	0	1	1	0	0	3	0	0	6
Prince Edward Island (MacLean)	0	0	1	0	0	1	1	0	2	2	7

Sheet C	1	2	3	4	5	6	7	8	9	10	Final
Nova Scotia 2 (Blades)	0	1	0	0	1	0	0	0	0	X	2
Newfoundland and Labrador (Mitchell) 🔨	2	0	0	1	0	2	0	2	0	X	7

Sheet D	1	2	3	4	5	6	7	8	9	10	Final
Manitoba 1 (Tober)	0	0	1	0	1	0	2	0	0	X	4
Alberta 1 (Gray-Withers) 🔨	0	1	0	1	0	1	0	2	1	X	6

Sheet E	1	2	3	4	5	6	7	8	9	10	Final
Saskatchewan (Kleiter) 🔨	2	0	4	0	2	1	1	0	X	X	10
Yukon (Scoffin)	0	2	0	1	0	0	0	1	X	X	4

Sheet F	1	2	3	4	5	6	7	8	9	10	Final
Quebec 1 (Cheal)	1	0	0	1	0	0	1	0	2	0	5
Ontario 2 (Steele) 🔨	0	2	3	0	0	0	0	1	0	1	7

Sheet G	1	2	3	4	5	6	7	8	9	10	Final
Nova Scotia 1 (Stevens) 🔨	3	0	0	0	1	0	1	2	0	1	8
Ontario 1 (Deschenes)	0	0	2	1	0	2	0	0	2	0	7

Sheet H	1	2	3	4	5	6	7	8	9	10	Final
Manitoba 2 (Maguet) 🔨	0	1	0	0	1	1	0	1	X	X	4
Alberta 2 (Booth)	1	0	2	1	0	0	2	0	X	X	6

==== Draw 14 ====
Tuesday, March 29, 7:00 pm

Sheet A	1	2	3	4	5	6	7	8	9	10	Final
Ontario 1 (Deschenes)	2	0	2	2	1	1	1	0	X	X	9
Quebec 1 (Cheal) 🔨	0	1	0	0	0	0	0	2	X	X	3

Sheet B	1	2	3	4	5	6	7	8	9	10	Final
Manitoba 2 (Maguet)	0	1	2	0	0	0	0	2	X	X	5
British Columbia (Hafeli) 🔨	3	0	0	0	4	3	2	0	X	X	12

Sheet C	1	2	3	4	5	6	7	8	9	10	Final
Yukon (Scoffin)	0	0	1	0	0	2	0	0	X	X	3
Ontario 2 (Steele) 🔨	2	1	0	5	2	0	1	2	X	X	13

Sheet D	1	2	3	4	5	6	7	8	9	10	Final
Saskatchewan (Kleiter) 🔨	1	0	1	0	0	0	1	0	X	X	3
Nova Scotia 1 (Stevens)	0	4	0	2	1	2	0	2	X	X	11

Sheet E	1	2	3	4	5	6	7	8	9	10	11	Final
Newfoundland and Labrador (Mitchell) 🔨	0	1	0	0	1	2	0	2	0	3	0	9
Quebec 2 (Fortin)	0	0	2	1	0	0	3	0	3	0	2	11

Sheet F	1	2	3	4	5	6	7	8	9	10	Final
Manitoba 1 (Tober) 🔨	0	1	0	3	0	0	2	0	X	X	6
New Brunswick (Evans)	1	0	4	0	4	1	0	1	X	X	11

Sheet G	1	2	3	4	5	6	7	8	9	10	Final
Northwest Territories (Rogers)	0	0	1	0	0	0	5	0	0	X	6
Prince Edward Island (MacLean) 🔨	0	2	0	2	1	1	0	0	2	X	8

Sheet H	1	2	3	4	5	6	7	8	9	10	Final
Northern Ontario (Lukowich) 🔨	1	0	2	0	2	0	4	0	X	X	9
Nova Scotia 2 (Blades)	0	0	0	1	0	1	0	1	X	X	3

==== Draw 16 ====
Wednesday, March 30, 2:00 pm

Sheet A	1	2	3	4	5	6	7	8	9	10	Final
Prince Edward Island (MacLean) 🔨	0	1	0	1	1	0	0	0	0	X	3
Manitoba 1 (Tober)	1	0	1	0	0	1	1	2	1	X	7

Sheet B	1	2	3	4	5	6	7	8	9	10	Final
Northern Ontario (Lukowich) 🔨	0	0	0	2	2	2	0	0	0	1	7
Newfoundland and Labrador (Mitchell)	1	1	0	0	0	0	1	1	2	0	6

Sheet C	1	2	3	4	5	6	7	8	9	10	Final
Alberta 1 (Gray-Withers) 🔨	2	1	0	0	0	2	0	1	0	X	6
New Brunswick (Evans)	0	0	0	1	0	0	4	0	4	X	9

Sheet D	1	2	3	4	5	6	7	8	9	10	Final
Quebec 2 (Fortin) 🔨	0	1	0	3	2	1	3	0	X	X	10
Northwest Territories (Rogers)	0	0	1	0	0	0	0	2	X	X	3

Sheet E	1	2	3	4	5	6	7	8	9	10	Final
Ontario 2 (Steele)	0	0	0	2	0	0	1	0	1	1	5
Manitoba 2 (Maguet) 🔨	1	0	0	0	1	1	0	1	0	0	4

Sheet F	1	2	3	4	5	6	7	8	9	10	11	Final
Saskatchewan (Kleiter) 🔨	0	1	1	1	1	1	0	0	0	0	1	6
Ontario 1 (Deschenes)	0	0	0	0	0	0	2	1	1	1	0	5

Sheet G	1	2	3	4	5	6	7	8	9	10	Final
Alberta 2 (Booth) 🔨	1	0	0	2	0	0	2	0	0	1	6
British Columbia (Hafeli)	0	0	2	0	2	0	0	0	1	0	5

Sheet H	1	2	3	4	5	6	7	8	9	10	Final
Quebec 1 (Cheal) 🔨	2	0	2	0	2	0	2	0	0	0	8
Yukon (Scoffin)	0	1	0	1	0	1	0	1	1	1	6

==== Draw 18 ====
Thursday, March 31, 9:00 am

Sheet A	1	2	3	4	5	6	7	8	9	10	Final
British Columbia (Hafeli) 🔨	0	1	0	1	0	2	1	0	0	2	7
Saskatchewan (Kleiter)	0	0	1	0	3	0	0	1	1	0	6

Sheet B	1	2	3	4	5	6	7	8	9	10	Final
Alberta 2 (Booth) 🔨	1	0	0	2	0	1	0	1	0	0	5
Nova Scotia 1 (Stevens)	0	1	1	0	2	0	2	0	2	1	9

Sheet C	1	2	3	4	5	6	7	8	9	10	Final
Manitoba 2 (Maguet)	0	0	0	1	0	1	1	0	1	X	4
Quebec 1 (Cheal) 🔨	2	1	2	0	1	0	0	2	0	X	8

Sheet D	1	2	3	4	5	6	7	8	9	10	11	Final
Ontario 1 (Deschenes)	0	3	0	0	1	0	1	0	0	1	2	8
Ontario 2 (Steele) 🔨	0	0	2	1	0	2	0	0	1	0	0	6

Sheet E	1	2	3	4	5	6	7	8	9	10	Final
New Brunswick (Evans) 🔨	0	0	0	0	3	0	0	0	2	X	5
Northern Ontario (Lukowich)	1	2	0	0	0	1	1	2	0	X	7

Sheet F	1	2	3	4	5	6	7	8	9	10	Final
Alberta 1 (Gray-Withers) 🔨	0	3	0	2	0	1	0	0	2	0	8
Nova Scotia 2 (Blades)	1	0	3	0	1	0	1	2	0	2	10

Sheet G	1	2	3	4	5	6	7	8	9	10	Final
Manitoba 1 (Tober)	1	0	0	2	1	0	2	2	X	X	8
Quebec 2 (Fortin) 🔨	0	0	2	0	0	1	0	0	X	X	3

Sheet H	1	2	3	4	5	6	7	8	9	10	11	Final
Newfoundland and Labrador (Mitchell)	0	0	0	1	0	0	1	3	0	1	0	6
Prince Edward Island (MacLean) 🔨	0	2	0	0	2	1	0	0	1	0	2	8

=== Playoffs ===
Qualification games
B2	Ontario 1	7
A3	Alberta 1	4
A2	New Brunswick	4
B3	Alberta 2	11

Semifinals
A1	Northern Ontario	5
B2	Ontario 1	10
B1	Nova Scotia 1	7
B3	Alberta 2	6

Final
B2	Ontario 1	5
B1	Nova Scotia 1	7
Bronze medal game
A1	Northern Ontario	5
B3	Alberta 2	13

==== Quarterfinals ====
Thursday, March 31, 7:00 pm

Sheet A	1	2	3	4	5	6	7	8	9	10	Final
New Brunswick (Evans) 🔨	2	0	2	0	0	0	0	0	0	X	4
Alberta 2 (Booth)	0	1	0	1	1	1	2	4	1	X	11

Sheet C	1	2	3	4	5	6	7	8	9	10	Final
Ontario 1 (Deschenes) 🔨	1	0	1	0	1	0	2	1	1	X	7
Alberta 1 (Gray-Withers)	0	2	0	1	0	1	0	0	0	X	4

==== Semifinals ====
Friday, April 1, 9:00 am

Sheet B	1	2	3	4	5	6	7	8	9	10	Final
Nova Scotia 1 (Stevens) 🔨	2	0	0	2	0	0	0	1	0	2	7
Alberta 2 (Booth)	0	0	1	0	1	1	1	0	2	0	6

Sheet D	1	2	3	4	5	6	7	8	9	10	Final
Northern Ontario (Lukowich) 🔨	2	0	0	0	0	2	0	0	1	X	5
Ontario 1 (Deschenes)	0	1	3	1	2	0	1	2	0	X	10

==== Bronze medal game ====
Friday, April 1, 2:30 pm

Sheet A	1	2	3	4	5	6	7	8	9	10	Final
Northern Ontario (Lukowich)	0	1	0	0	0	1	0	0	3	X	5
Alberta 2 (Booth) 🔨	1	0	1	3	3	0	4	1	0	X	13

==== Final ====
Friday, April 1, 2:30 pm

Sheet C	1	2	3	4	5	6	7	8	9	10	Final
Ontario 1 (Deschenes)	0	1	0	2	0	0	1	0	1	0	5
Nova Scotia 1 (Stevens) 🔨	0	0	1	0	1	1	0	2	0	2	7

== Qualification ==
=== Alberta ===
The Alberta U20 Junior Provincials were held from February 23–27, 2022 at the Spray Lake Sawmills Family Sports Centre in Cochrane.

The championship was held in a modified triple-knockout format, which qualified six teams for a championship round. Two men's teams and two women's teams qualified for the national championship.

Pre-Playoff Results:

Men	W	L
Ben Helston (Calgary)	3	0
Cortland Sonnenberg (Sexsmith/Grande Prairie)	3	0
Kenan Wipf (North Hill/Cochrane)	4	1
Beau Cornelson (Rose City)	3	1
James Ballance (Note: James Ballance was listed as the team's skip at the Alberta U20 Junior Provincials, however, Justin Runciman skipped the team at the national championship.) (Okotoks)	4	2
Johnson Tao (Saville)	2	2
Ethan Chung (St. Albert)	3	3
Lowell Whittmire (Lethbridge/Sherwood Park/Okotoks)	3	3
Kyler Kurina (Okotoks)	2	3
Justin Runciman (Ellerslie/Sherwood Park/Leduc)	2	3
Kinley Burton (Saville)	1	3
Zach Davies (Saville)	1	3
Kaleb Lis (Saville)	1	3
Blake Petkau (North Hill)	1	3
Ben Kiist (Okotoks)	0	3

Women	W	L
Olivia Jones (Note: Team Olivia Jones finished second at the Alberta U20 Junior Provincials, however, Team Claire Booth represented Alberta 2 at the national championship.) (Okotoks/Strathmore/Saville)	3	0
Serena Gray-Withers (Saville)	2	0
Gabby Wood (St. Albert)	3	1
Claire Booth (Calgary)	2	1
Kayleigh Shannon (Lethbridge)	4	2
Jessica Wytrychowski (Cochrane/Airdrie)	4	2
C. J. Jackson (Lacombe/Innisfail)	3	3
Ryleigh Bakker (Calgary/Okotoks/Glencoe)	2	3
Morgan DeSchiffart (Lacombe)	2	3
Myla Plett (Airdrie/Sherwood Park)	2	3
Chloe Johnston (Okotoks)	0	3
Hannah Northwood (Airdrie)	0	3
Josie Zimmerman (Rose City)	0	3

Playoff Results:

- Men's Quarterfinal 1: Cornelson 2 – Tao 8
- Men's Quarterfinal 2: Wipf 8 – Ballance 9
- Men's Semifinal 1: Sonnenberg 2 – Tao 5
- Men's Semifinal 2: Helston 4 – Ballance 8
- Men's Final: Tao 5 – Ballance 4
- Women's Quarterfinal 1: Wood 6 – Wytrychowski 4
- Women's Quarterfinal 2: Booth 5 – Shannon 4
- Women's Semifinal 1: Jones 9 – Wood 6
- Women's Semifinal 2: Gray-Withers 8 – Booth 6
- Women's Final: Jones 5 – Gray-Withers 6

=== British Columbia ===
The BC U-21 Junior Curling Championships were held from February 22–27, 2022 at the Comox Valley Curling Club in Comox, British Columbia.

The championship was held in a round robin format, which qualified three men's teams and six women's teams for the championship round. Two men's teams qualified for the national championship.

Pre-Playoff Results:

Men	W	L
Connor Deane (Royal City)	5	0
Connor Kent (Royal City/Port Moody)	3	2
Adam Fenton (Royal City)	3	2
Daniel Deng (Royal City/Nanaimo/Kamloops)	2	3
Chris Parkinson (Comox Valley/Qualicum/Parksville)	1	4
Mitchell Kopytko (Kamloops)	1	4

Women	W	L
Pool A
Emily Bowles (Tunnel Town/Royal City/Delta Thistle)	4	1
Kaila Buchy (Kelowna/Victoria/Royal City/Kimberley)	4	1
Gracelyn Richards (Comox Valley/Duncan/Royal City)	3	2
Kayla Wilson (Victoria/Salmon Arm)	3	2
Emma Woike (Duncan)	0	5
Pool B
Holly Hafeli (Kamloops)	5	0
Bryelle Wong (Royal City)	3	2
Gabby Brissette (Chilliwack)	1	4
Kaelen Coles-Lyster (Marpole/Vancouver/Royal City/Golden Ears)	1	4
Amy Wheatcroft (Golden Ears)	1	4

Playoff Results:

- Men's Semifinal: Kent 7 – Fenton 8
- Men's Final: Deane 7 – Fenton 5
- Women's Qualification Game 1: Buchy 10 – Brissette 7
- Women's Qualification Game 2: Wong 0 – Richards 10
- Women's Quarterfinal: Buchy 7 – Richards 8
- Women's Semifinal 1: Bowles 5 – Hafeli 6
- Women's Semifinal 2: Bowles 5 – Richards 11
- Women's Final: Hafeli 9 – Richards 3

=== Manitoba ===
The Telus Junior Provincial Championships were held from February 22–27, 2022 at the Brandon Curling Club in Brandon.

The championship was held in a round robin format, which qualified four teams for a page-playoff championship round. Two men's teams and two women's teams qualified for the national championship.

Pre-Playoff Results:

Men	W	L
Asham Black Pool
Jordon McDonald (Deer Lodge)	5	0
Thomas McGillivray (Fort Garry)	4	1
Lucas Pedersen (Rivers)	3	2
Luke Steski (West St. Paul)	2	3
Cameron Olafson (East St. Paul)	1	4
Tanner Graham (Petersfield)	0	5
Asham Express Red Pool
Jordan Johnson (Heather)	5	0
Aaron Van Ryssel (Springfield)	4	1
Jace Freeman (Virden)	3	2
Jack Lyburn (Brandon)	1	4
Ronan Peterson (Fort Rouge)	1	4
Matthew Bijl (Assiniboine Memorial)	1	4

Women	W	L
Asham Black Pool
Morgan Maguet (East St. Paul)	5	0
Emma Jensen (Heather)	3	2
Zoey Terrick (Neepawa)	3	2
Samantha Gevers (St. Vital)	2	3
Dayna Wahl (Altona)	2	3
Shaela Hayward (Carman)	0	5
Asham Express Red Pool
Grace Beaudry (St. Vital)	4	1
Cheyenne Ehnes (Assiniboine Memorial)	3	2
Tansy Tober (Fort Garry)	3	2
Emily Ogg (Assiniboine Memorial)	3	2
Bethany Allen (St. Vital)	2	3
Cloe Haluschak (Swan River)	0	5

Playoff Results:

- Men's A1 vs B1: McDonald 6 – Johnson 1
- Men's A2 vs B2: McGillivray 1 – Van Ryssel 9
- Men's Semifinal: Johnson 7 – Van Ryssel 8
- Men's Final: McDonald 6 – Van Ryssel 3
- Women's Tiebreaker 1: Terrick 10 – Ogg 8
- Women's Tiebreaker 2: Jensen 3 – Tober 7
- Women's A1 vs B1: Maguet 7 – Beaudry 4
- Women's A2 vs B2: Terrick 2 – Tober 6
- Women's Semifinal: Beaudry 4 – Tober 6
- Women's Final: Maguet 4 – Tober 11

=== New Brunswick ===
The New Brunswick U20 Championship was held from February 25–28, 2022 at the Capital Winter Club in Fredericton.

The championship was held in a modified triple-knockout format, which qualified three teams for a championship round.

Pre-Playoff Results:

Men	W	L
Rajan Dalrymple (Gage/Moncton)	5	2
Emmanuel Porter (Gage/Capital/Moncton)	4	1
Luke Robichaud (Capital/Woodstock)	2	3
Timothy Marin (TSA/Woodstock)	1	3
Sahil Dalrymple (Gage)	0	3

Women	W	L
Celia Evans (Gage)	3	1
Jenna Campbell (Capital)	3	2
Mélodie Forsythe (Moncton/Capital)	2	3
Sarah Gaines (Capital)	0	3

Playoff Results:

- Men's Semifinal: R. Dalrymple 6 – Porter 5
- Men's Final: Porter 2 – R. Dalrymple 6
- Women's Semifinal: Evans 7 – Campbell 9
- Women's Final: Evans 9 – Campbell 2

=== Newfoundland and Labrador ===
The U21 Juniors were held from February 22–27, 2022 at the Bally Haly Golf & Curling Club in St. John's.

The men's championship was held in a round robin format, while the women's event was held in a double round robin format. Two men's teams qualified for the national championship.

Pre-Playoff Results:

Men	W	L
Nathan Young (RE/MAX)	5	0
Sean O'Leary (RE/MAX)	4	1
Simon Perry (RE/MAX)	3	2
Parker Tipple (RE/MAX)	2	3
Liam Quinlan (Bally Haly)	1	4
Carter Holden (RE/MAX)	0	5

Women	W	L
Mackenzie Mitchell (RE/MAX)	4	0
Cailey Locke (RE/MAX)	1	3
Sarah McNeil Lamswood (RE/MAX)	1	3

Playoff Results:

- Men's Final: Young 10 – O'Leary 3
- No women's playoff round required as Team Mitchell had already beaten everybody twice.

=== Northern Ontario ===
The Best Western U21 Junior Provincials were held from March 3–6, 2022 at the Community First Curling Centre in Sault Ste. Marie.

The championship was held in round robin format, with the top two teams competing in the championship final.

Pre-Playoff Results:

Men	W	L
Dallas Burgess (Kakabeka Falls)	4	0
Brendan Rajala (Sudbury)	2	2
Malcolm O'Bright (North Bay)	2	2
Joshua Landry (Horne Granite)	1	3
Josh Hales (Community First)	1	3

Women	W	L
Bella Croisier (Sudbury)	4	0
Katy Lukowich (Sudbury)	3	1
Mia Toner (Sudbury)	1	3
Abby Deschene (Sudbury)	1	3
Mackenzie McLean (Horne Granite)	1	3

Playoff Results:

- Men's Tiebreaker: Rajala 9 – O'Bright 8
- Men's Final: Burgess 6 – Rajala
- Women's Final: Croisier 6 – Lukowich 7

=== Northwest Territories ===
The NWTCA Junior Curling Championships were held from February 11–13, 2022 at the Yellowknife Curling Centre in Yellowknife.

No men's event was held as there was only one registered team, Team Mason MacNeil. The women's event was held in a best-of-five series between two rinks.

Results:

Women	W	L
Cassie Rogers (Yellowknife)	3	0
Reese Wainman (Inuvik)	0	3

=== Nova Scotia ===
Due to the COVID-19 pandemic in Nova Scotia, the AMJ Campbell U21 Championships were cancelled. A selection process was held to determine the men's and women's representatives for the championship. Two women's teams qualified for the national championship.

- Men's Team: Nick Mosher
- Women's Team 1: Taylour Stevens
- Women's Team 2: Sophie Blades

=== Ontario ===
The Ontario U-21 Curling Championships were held from March 2–6, 2022 at the KW Granite Club in Waterloo.

The championship was held in a modified triple-knockout format, which qualified four teams for a championship round. Two men's teams and two women's teams qualified for the national championship.

Pre-Playoff Results:

Men	W	L
Dylan Niepage (Guelph)	3	0
Landan Rooney (Whitby)	4	1
Christopher Inglis (Peterborough)	5	2
Matthew Prenevost (Niagara Falls)	4	2
Connor Massey (Cataraqui)	4	3
Daniel Hocevar (Dixie)	2	3
Kibo Mulima (RCMP)	2	3
Carter Bryant (London)	1	3
Jake Dobson (Barrie)	1	3
Sean Blythe (Ottawa Hunt)	0	3
Jacob Goves (Bradford)	0	3

Women	W	L
Emily Deschenes (Rideau)	3	0
Dominique Vivier (Navan)	4	1
Charlotte Johnston (London)	5	2
Rachel Steele (High Park)	4	2
Ella Dobson (London)	4	3
Abbey Salari (Grimsby)	3	3
Tori Zemmelink (Guelph)	3	3
Daniela Aucoin (Brant)	2	3
Logan Shaw (Grimsby)	1	3
Emma Acres (RCMP)	0	3
Alix Giles (Winchester)	0	3
Jenny Madden (Manotick)	0	3

Playoff Results:

- Men's Final 1: Niepage 5 – Rooney 6
- Men's Semifinal: Inglis 7 – Prenevost 6
- Men's Final 2: Niepage 10 – Inglis 5
- Women's Final 1: Deschenes 5 – Vivier 3
- Women's Semifinal: Johnston 2 – Steele 4
- Women's Final 2: Vivier 5 – Steele 6

=== Prince Edward Island ===
The Pepsi PEI Provincial Junior Curling Championships were held from February 24–27, 2022 at the Cornwall Curling Club in Cornwall.

The championship was held in a modified triple-knockout format, which qualified three teams for a championship round.

Pre-Playoff Results:

Men	W	L
Mitchell Schut (Cornwall)	6	0
Brayden Snow (Summerside)	3	3
Brock Rochford (Summerside)	0	3
Isaiah Dalton (Cornwall)	0	3

Women	W	L
Ella Lenentine (Cornwall)	4	2
Rachel MacLean (Cornwall)	3	2
Madalyn Easter (Summerside)	2	2
Sydney Carver (Montague)	0	3

Playoff Results:

- No men's playoff was required as Team Schut won all three qualifying events.
- Women's Semifinal: Easter 4 – MacLean 11
- Women's Final: Lenentine 7 – MacLean 11

=== Quebec ===
The Quebec Performance Brush U21 Provincials were held from March 3–6, 2022 at the Club de curling Kénogami in Jonquière.

The championship was held in a round robin format, which qualified two men's teams and three women's teams for the championship round. Two women's teams qualified for the national championship.

Pre-Playoff Results:

Men	W	L
Dimitri Audibert (Riverbend/Trois-Rivières)	3	1
Cédric Maurice (Laval-sur-le-Lac)	2	2
Anthony Pedneault (Kénogami/Victoria)	1	3

Women	W	L
Lauren Cheal (Lennoxville/Kénogami)	5	0
Sarah-Ann Daigle (Etchemin)	3	2
Jolianne Fortin (Kénogami)	3	2
Anne-Sophie Gionest (Riverbend)	3	2
Hannah Gargul (Pointe Claire/Laval-sur-le-Lac)	1	4
Sandrine Roy (Trois-Rivières)	0	5

Playoff Results:

- Men's Final: Audibert 10 – Maurice 4
- Women's Final 1: Cheal 9 – Daigle 1
- Women's Semifinal: Fortin 8 – Gionest 4
- Women's Final 2: Daigle 4 – Fortin 7

=== Saskatchewan ===
The Junior Provincials were held from February 24–28, 2022 at the Martensville Curling Club in Martensville.

The championship was held in a modified triple-knockout format, which qualified four teams for a championship round. Two men's teams qualified for the national championship.

Pre-Playoff Results:

Men	W	L
Nathen Pomedli (Nutana)	3	0
Daymond Bernath (Sutherland)	4	1
Josh Bryden (Regina)	3	2
Logan Ede (Saskatoon)	3	2
Cody Sutherland (North Battleford)	2	3
Matthew Drewitz (Saskatoon)	1	3
Brandon Zuravloff (Canora)	1	3
Nolan Lindberg (Moose Jaw)	0	3

Women	W	L
Madison Kleiter (Sutherland)	3	0
Elizabeth Kessel (Moose Jaw)	4	1
Savanna Taylor (Saskatoon)	3	2
Cara Kesslering (Yorkton)	3	2
Emily Haupstein (Saskatoon)	2	3
Chantel Hoag (Regina)	1	3
Claudia Lacell (Moose Jaw)	1	3
Kaydence Lalonde (Saskatoon)	0	3

Playoff Results:

- Men's 1 vs. 2: Pomedli 4 – Bernath 7
- Men's 3 vs. 4: Bryden 4 – Ede 9
- Men's Semifinal: Pomedli 8 – Ede 2
- Men's Final: Bernath 11 – Pomedli 4
- Women's 1 vs. 2: Kleiter 9 – Kessel 2
- Women's 3 vs. 4: Taylor 9 – Kesslering 4
- Women's Semifinal: Kessel 7 – Taylor 6
- Women's Final: Kleiter 6 – Kessel 4

=== Yukon ===
- Men's Team: No men's team declared
- Women's Team: Bayly Scoffin (Whitehorse)
