= Scott Chadwick =

Canadian curler

- Curler
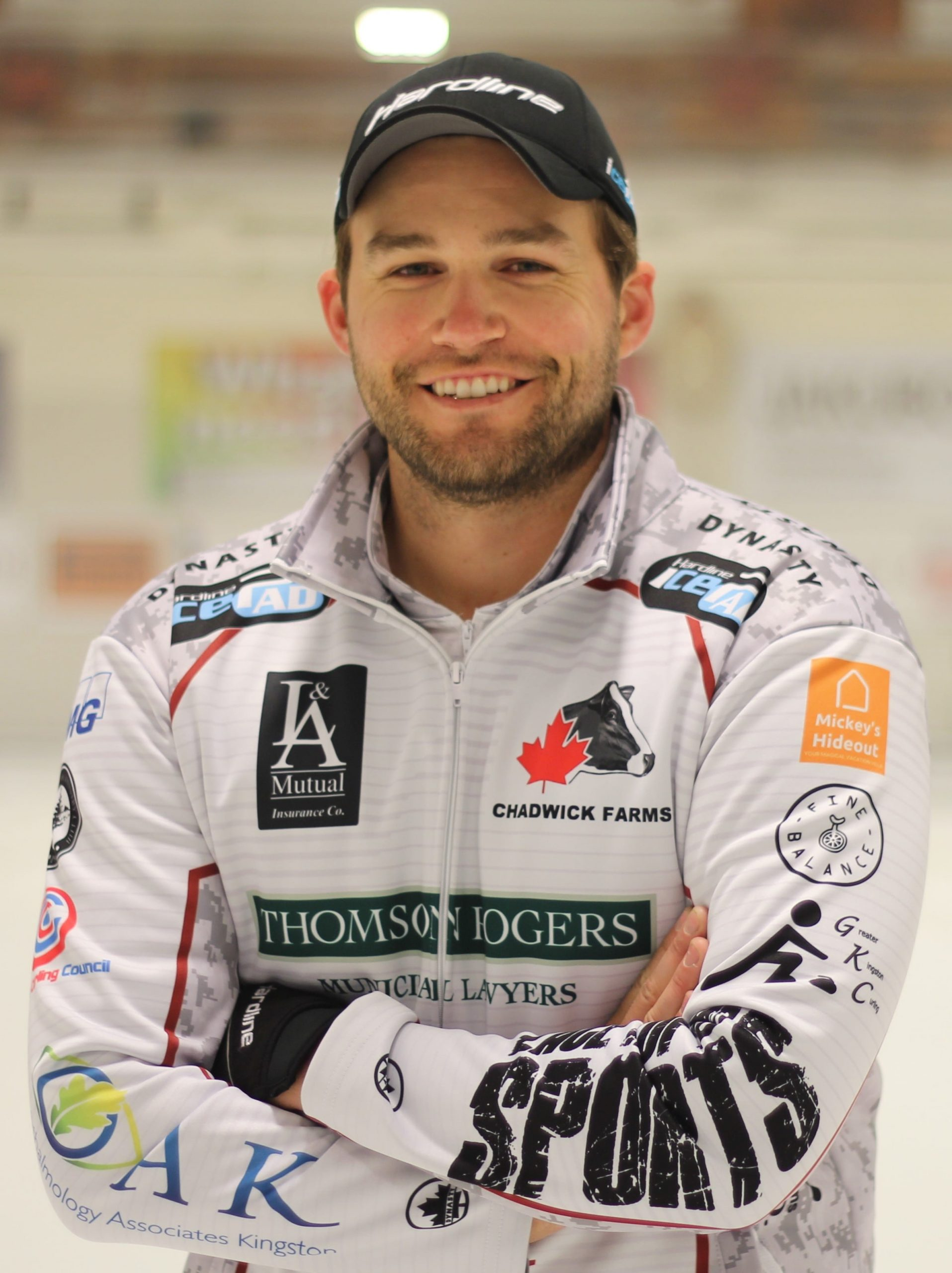
- Scott Chadwick during 2021–2022 season
- Born: January 16, 1991 (age 35); Napanee, Ontario

Team
- Curling club: Cataraqui G&CC, Kingston, ON
- Skip: Scott Howard
- Third: David Mathers
- Second: Pat Janssen
- Lead: Scott Chadwick

Curling career
- Member Association: Ontario (2009–2023; 2024–present); Northern Ontario (2023–2024)
- Brier: 1 (2019)
- Top CTRS ranking: 9th (2018–19, 2022–23)

Scott Chadwick (born January 16, 1991) is a Canadian curler from Napanee, Ontario. He currently plays lead on Team Scott Howard.

In 2021, he competed at the 2021 Canadian Olympic Curling Trials.

== Career ==
While at Queen's University at Kingston, Chadwick won the 2010 CIS/CCA Curling Championships and placed fifth the following year at the 2011 Winter Universiade in Erzurum, Turkey. Chadwick would later team up with Greg Balsdon and capture the 2016 GSOC Tour Challenge Tier 2. In 2019, along with Scott McDonald, Jonathan Beuk and Wesley Forget, he represented Ontario at the 2019 Tim Hortons Brier where they finished with a 6–5 record. In 2021, while playing lead for Tanner Horgan, he finished second at the 2021 Canadian Olympic Curling Pre-Trials, earning a spot in the 2021 Canadian Olympic Curling Trials. There, Team Horgan finished in last place with a 1–7 record. Chadwick joined John Epping for the 2022-23 season before joining back up with Horgan for the 2023-24 season.

Chadwick would later join the Scott Howard rink as lead for the 2025–26 curling season alongside brothers Mathew and Jason Camm, where they played in the 2025 Canadian Olympic Curling Pre-Trials. At the Pre-Trials, the team would have a strong showing but finish in third place, losing 5–4 in the semifinals to Jordon McDonald and failing to qualify for the official Trials.

== Personal ==
Chadwick is married and works as a maintenance manager at Kruger Inc in Quinte West Ontario. He is a graduate of Queen's University at Kingston.
