= Elias Huminicki =

Canadian curler

- Curler
- Born: July 29, 2004 (age 22); Selkirk, Manitoba

Team
- Curling club: Assiniboine Memorial CC, Winnipeg
- Skip: Jordon McDonald
- Third: Jacques Gauthier
- Second: Elias Huminicki
- Lead: Cameron Olafson

Curling career
- Member Association: Manitoba
- Other appearances: Canada Winter Games: 1 (2023)
- Top CTRS ranking: 7th (2024–25)
Medal record
Men's curling

Elias Huminicki (born July 29, 2004) is a Canadian curler from Winnipeg Beach, Manitoba. He currently is the second on Team Jordon McDonald.

== Career ==
=== Juniors ===
Huminicki would find most of his success during his Junior career as second for Jordon McDonald. He would first represent Manitoba in the 2021–22 curling season at the 2021 World Junior Qualification Event with McDonald, third Reece Hamm, lead Alexandre Fontaine, and alternate Jayden Rutter. At the World Junior Qualifier, they would finish 3–2 in the round robin, but would lose to Newfoundland and Labrador's Nathan Young in the quarterfinals. Team McDonald would then go on to win the Manitoba Junior Curling Championship, representing Manitoba at the 2022 Canadian Junior Curling Championships where they would again qualify for the playoffs, finishing round-robin play at the top of their group with a 7–1 record, but would finish 4th after losing the semifinals and bronze medal game to Alberta and Saskatchewan respectively. Huminicki and McDonald would also play in U18 events during the season, winning the U18 Manitoba Championships and representing Manitoba at the 2022 Canadian U18 Curling Championships, alongside third Jace Freeman, and lead Cameron Olafson. At the U18 Championships, Team McDonald would lose in the quarterfinals 5–4 to eventual champions Saskatchewan.

For the 2022–23 curling season, Huminicki would curl with two separate teams in U18 and U20 events. Huminicki would continue to curl with McDonald for U20 Junior events, alongside Hamm and Olafson. With Team McDonald, they captured another Manitoba Junior Curling Championship and would compete at the 2023 Canadian Junior Curling Championships, where they would finish round-robin play with an undefeated 8–0 record, qualifying again for the playoffs. After losing to Northern Ontario's Dallas Burgess in the semifinals, McDonald would rebound with a win over Ontario's Landan Rooney 7–4 in the bronze medal game, finishing in third place. For U18 events during the 2022–23 season, Huminicki would be third on a team skipped by his teammate from last season, Jace Freeman, alongside second Jack Steski and lead Rylan Graham. They would qualify to represent Manitoba at the 2023 Canada Winter Games, where they would finish in 5th place with a 3–2 record. Team Freeman would also win the U18 Manitoba Championships and represent Manitoba at the 2023 Canadian U18 Curling Championships, where Huminicki and Freeman would again lose in the quarterfinals to the eventual champions, this time to Alberta.

After Huminicki would age out of U18 events during the 2023–24 curling season, he would curl solely with Team McDonald alongside new third Dallas Burgess who moved from Northern Ontario, and Olafson. The McDonald rink would again capture the Manitoba Junior Curling Championship, and represent as Team Manitoba 1 at the 2024 Canadian Junior Curling Championships. McDonald would again qualify for the playoffs with a 7–1 record after round-robin play, but would lose in the quarterfinals in a rematch of the Manitoba Junior final to Team Manitoba 2, skipped by former U18 teammate Jace Freeman.

=== Men's ===
Team McDonald would stay together for the 2024–25 curling season as McDonald, Burgess, and Olafson aged out of Juniors. While Huminicki still had another year of eligibility for the Canadian Juniors, he also decided to only focus on men's events. They would start off the season strong by winning the 2024 U25 NextGen Classic over Jayden King. This win would provide the team direct entry into Curling Canada's NextGen Future program, a new initiative by Curling Canada to help junior teams to transition into the adult ranks by providing them access to Curling Canada's National Coaches, among other benefits. As the U25 NextGen Team, McDonald also participated in the 2024 PointsBet Invitational with Canada's top men's teams based on CTRS Rankings. At the PointsBet Invitational, McDonald would beat top-ranked teams including Matt Dunstone and former world men's champion Kevin Koe, before losing to Brad Gushue 9–7 in the final four. McDonald would continue to have an impressive season, finishing second to Mike McEwen at the 2024 Saville Shootout and winning the MCT Curling Cup. Team McDonald would qualify for the 2025 Manitoba Men's Provincial Championship as one of the top ranked CTRS teams in Manitoba, however would lose to eventual champions Reid Carruthers 8–4 in the playoff round.

Team McDonald would announce in the offseason that Jacques Gauthier would join the McDonald rink as their new third for the 2025–26 curling season. The new team McDonald would start the season playing in the 2025 U25 NextGen Classic but failing to repeat as champions, finishing second after losing 6–4 in the final to Sam Mooibroek. However, Team McDonald would still remain part of Curling Canada's National U-25 NextGen Program. McDonald would again participate in the 2025 PointsBet Invitational, where they would finish 3–1 after round robin play, but fail to qualify for the championship final. Their next event would be the 2025 Canadian Olympic Curling Pre-Trials, where Team McDonald would win the event – beating Manitoba rival Braden Calvert 2 games to 1 in a best-of-three final, qualifying the team for the 2025 Canadian Olympic Curling Trials, where Huminicki would be the youngest person to ever compete on a team at the Canadian Curling Trials At these Olympic Trials, the McDonald rink would finish round robin play with a 1–6 record. During the season, McDonald would participate in his first Tier 1 Grand Slam of Curling event at the 2025 GSOC Tahoe. There, Team McDonald would finish 1–3. They would also play in the 2026 Bunge Championship (the Manitoba provincial men's championship) where they would again face provincial rivals Team Calvert in the final, but this time would lose 10–7 in an extra end, finishing second.

== Personal life ==
Huminicki lives in Winnipeg Beach and is a farmer. He also graduated from the University of Manitoba.

== Teams ==
Season(s)	Skip	Third	Second	Lead	Alternate
2021–22	Jordon McDonald (Note: U18 Team)	Jace Freeman	Elias Huminicki	Cameron Olafson	
2021–22	Jordon McDonald (Note: U20 Team)	Reece Hamm	Elias Huminicki	Alexandre Fontaine	Jayden Rutter
2022–23	Jace Freeman (Note: U18 Team)	Elias Huminicki	Jack Steski	Rylan Graham	
2022–23	Jordon McDonald (Note: U20 Team)	Reece Hamm	Elias Huminicki	Cameron Olafson	
2023–24	Jordon McDonald	Dallas Burgess	Elias Huminicki	Cameron Olafson	
2024–25	Jordon McDonald	Dallas Burgess	Elias Huminicki	Cameron Olafson	
2025–26	Jordon McDonald	Jacques Gauthier	Elias Huminicki	Cameron Olafson	
2026–27	Jordon McDonald	Jacques Gauthier	Elias Huminicki	Cameron Olafson	
