= 2025 Canadian Olympic Curling Pre-Trials =

- Host city: Wolfville, Nova Scotia
- Arena: Andrew H. McCain Arena
- Dates: October 20–26
- Men's winner: (Manitoba) Team McDonald
- Curling club: Assiniboine Memorial CC, Winnipeg
- Skip: Jordon McDonald
- Third: Jacques Gauthier
- Second: Elias Huminicki
- Lead: Cameron Olafson
- Coach: Bryan Miki
- Finalist: (Manitoba) Braden Calvert
- Women's winner: (Alberta) Team Sturmay
- Curling club: Saville Community SC, Edmonton
- Skip: Selena Sturmay
- Third: Danielle Schmiemann
- Second: Dezaray Hawes
- Lead: Paige Papley
- Coach: Ted Appelman
- Finalist: (British Columbia) Kayla MacMillan

The 2025 Canadian Olympic Curling Pre-Trials (branded as the 2025 Home Hardware Canadian Curling Pre-Trials for sponsorship reasons) were held from October 20 to 26 at the Andrew H. McCain Arena in Wolfville, Nova Scotia. The event qualified one men's (Jordon McDonald) and one women's (Selena Sturmay) team for the 2025 Canadian Olympic Curling Trials in Halifax.

== Qualification process ==
Eight men's teams and eight women's teams qualified for the event through CTRS standings at the conclusion of the 2024–25 season.

=== Men ===
Top CTRS men's teams:

1. (Manitoba) Jordon McDonald
2. (Ontario) Sam Mooibroek
3. (Ontario) Scott Howard
4. (Manitoba) Braden Calvert
5. (Ontario) Mark Kean
6. (Nova Scotia) Owen Purcell
7. (Quebec) Jean-Michel Ménard
8. (Ontario) Jayden King (Note: Spot was initially given to Team Reid Carruthers, however, the team withdrew from the pre-trials due to Carruthers' coaching commitments with Team Kerri Einarson. They were replaced with Team Jayden King, the top-ranked men's team in the CTRS yet to qualify.)

=== Women ===
Top CTRS women's teams:

1. (Manitoba) Beth Peterson
2. (British Columbia) Kayla MacMillan
3. (Ontario) Danielle Inglis
4. (Alberta) Selena Sturmay
5. (Saskatchewan) Ashley Thevenot
6. (Ontario) Krista Scharf
7. (Alberta) Myla Plett
8. (Saskatchewan) Nancy Martin

== Men ==
=== Teams ===
Skip	Third	Second	Lead	Alternate	Club
Braden Calvert	Corey Chambers	Kyle Kurz	Brendan Bilawka	Rob Gordon	Fort Rouge CC, Winnipeg, Manitoba
Scott Howard	Mat Camm	Jason Camm	Scott Chadwick		Navan CC, Navan, Ontario
Mark Kean	Brady Lumley	Matthew Garner	Spencer Dunlop	Connor Lawes	Woodstock CC, Woodstock, Ontario
Jayden King	Dylan Niepage	Owen Henry	Victor Pietrangelo		London CC, London, Ontario
Jordon McDonald	Jacques Gauthier	Elias Huminicki	Cameron Olafson		Assiniboine Memorial CC, Winnipeg, Manitoba
Félix Asselin (Fourth)	Jean-Michel Ménard (Skip)	Martin Crête	Jean-François Trépanier		Glenmore CC, Dollard-des-Ormeaux, Quebec, Curling des Collines, Chelsea, Quebec, Club de curling Etchemin, Saint-Romuald, Quebec & Club de curling Valleyfield, Salaberry-de-Valleyfield, Quebec
Sam Mooibroek	Ryan Wiebe	Scott Mitchell	Nathan Steele	Wyatt Small	Whitby CC, Whitby, Ontario
Owen Purcell	Luke Saunders	Gavin Lydiate	Ryan Abraham		Halifax CC, Halifax, Nova Scotia

=== Round robin standings ===
Final Round Robin Standings

Key
Teams to Playoffs

Team	W	L	W–L	PF	PA	EW	EL	BE	SE	S%	DSC
(Manitoba) Braden Calvert	5	2	1–0	50	41	29	27	5	6	86%	261.0
(Manitoba) Jordon McDonald	5	2	0–1	54	45	32	27	2	9	87%	450.3
(Ontario) Scott Howard	4	3	2–0	46	37	27	26	4	7	82%	154.5
(Ontario) Jayden King	4	3	1–1	53	54	30	29	3	10	84%	319.6
(Quebec) Jean-Michel Ménard	4	3	0–2	48	42	29	26	8	2	88%	202.1
(Ontario) Sam Mooibroek	3	4	1–0	47	49	31	28	3	7	81%	451.6
(Nova Scotia) Owen Purcell	3	4	0–1	42	57	25	32	9	1	81%	316.0
(Ontario) Mark Kean	0	7	–	40	55	27	35	3	4	80%	449.7

Round Robin Summary Table
Pos.	Team	(Manitoba) CAL	(Ontario) HOW	(Ontario) KEA	(Ontario) KIN	(Manitoba) MCD	(Quebec) MEN	(Ontario) MOO	(Nova Scotia) PUR	Record
1	(Ontario) Braden Calvert	—	8–6	9–5	12–9	8–4	2–7	6–4	5–6	5–2
3	(Ontario) Scott Howard	6–8	—	6–3	9–4	2–8	7–4	4–5	12–5	4–3
8	(Ontario) Mark Kean	5–9	3–6	—	6–7	5–6	5–8	9–10	7–9	0–7
4	(Ontario) Jayden King	9–12	4–9	7–6	—	6–11	10–8	9–5	8–3	4–3
2	(Manitoba) Jordon McDonald	4–8	8–2	6–5	11–6	—	6–9	10–8	9–7	5–2
5	(Quebec) Jean-Michel Ménard	7–2	4–7	8–5	8–10	9–6	—	6–5	6–7	4–3
6	(Ontario) Sam Mooibroek	4–6	5–4	10–9	5–9	8–10	5–6	—	10–5	3–4
7	(Nova Scotia) Owen Purcell	6–5	5–12	9–7	3–8	7–9	7–6	5–10	—	3–4

=== Round robin results ===
All draw times are listed in Atlantic Time (UTC−04:00).

==== Draw 1 ====
Monday, October 20, 9:00 am

Sheet B	1	2	3	4	5	6	7	8	9	10	Final
(Manitoba) Braden Calvert	0	0	0	0	1	0	0	1	0	X	2
(Quebec) Jean-Michel Ménard 🔨	0	0	1	0	0	0	5	0	1	X	7

Sheet C	1	2	3	4	5	6	7	8	9	10	Final
(Ontario) Jayden King	0	0	1	0	0	0	3	0	X	X	4
(Ontario) Scott Howard 🔨	2	2	0	2	2	1	0	0	X	X	9

Sheet D	1	2	3	4	5	6	7	8	9	10	Final
(Ontario) Mark Kean 🔨	0	0	2	0	2	0	0	0	1	0	5
(Manitoba) Jordon McDonald	0	2	0	0	0	0	2	1	0	1	6

Sheet E	1	2	3	4	5	6	7	8	9	10	Final
(Ontario) Sam Mooibroek 🔨	1	0	2	0	0	3	0	2	0	2	10
(Nova Scotia) Owen Purcell	0	2	0	2	0	0	1	0	0	0	5

==== Draw 2 ====
Monday, October 20, 2:00 pm

Sheet C	1	2	3	4	5	6	7	8	9	10	Final
(Manitoba) Braden Calvert 🔨	3	0	3	0	1	0	0	0	2	X	9
(Ontario) Mark Kean	0	1	0	1	0	0	2	1	0	X	5

==== Draw 3 ====
Monday, October 20, 7:00 pm

Sheet A	1	2	3	4	5	6	7	8	9	10	Final
(Ontario) Jayden King	0	0	2	0	2	0	2	0	X	X	6
(Manitoba) Jordon McDonald 🔨	2	0	0	3	0	2	0	4	X	X	11

Sheet B	1	2	3	4	5	6	7	8	9	10	Final
(Nova Scotia) Owen Purcell 🔨	0	3	0	0	0	2	0	0	X	X	5
(Ontario) Scott Howard	1	0	5	0	0	0	2	4	X	X	12

Sheet C	1	2	3	4	5	6	7	8	9	10	11	Final
(Quebec) Jean-Michel Ménard 🔨	0	2	0	0	0	0	0	2	0	1	1	6
(Ontario) Sam Mooibroek	0	0	0	0	2	0	1	0	2	0	0	5

==== Draw 4 ====
Tuesday, October 21, 9:00 am

Sheet A	1	2	3	4	5	6	7	8	9	10	11	Final
(Quebec) Jean-Michel Ménard	0	0	0	2	0	0	2	0	0	2	0	6
(Nova Scotia) Owen Purcell 🔨	0	0	1	0	0	1	0	4	0	0	1	7

Sheet C	1	2	3	4	5	6	7	8	9	10	Final
(Ontario) Mark Kean 🔨	0	1	1	0	2	0	0	0	0	2	6
(Ontario) Jayden King	1	0	0	1	0	1	1	2	1	0	7

==== Draw 5 ====
Tuesday, October 21, 2:00 pm

Sheet D	1	2	3	4	5	6	7	8	9	10	Final
(Ontario) Scott Howard 🔨	0	0	0	1	0	1	0	1	0	1	4
(Ontario) Sam Mooibroek	1	1	0	0	1	0	1	0	1	0	5

Sheet E	1	2	3	4	5	6	7	8	9	10	Final
(Manitoba) Jordon McDonald	0	0	0	2	1	0	0	1	0	X	4
(Manitoba) Braden Calvert 🔨	0	1	2	0	0	2	1	0	2	X	8

==== Draw 6 ====
Tuesday, October 21, 7:00 pm

Sheet A	1	2	3	4	5	6	7	8	9	10	Final
(Ontario) Scott Howard 🔨	2	0	0	1	0	1	0	2	0	X	6
(Ontario) Mark Kean	0	1	0	0	1	0	0	0	1	X	3

Sheet B	1	2	3	4	5	6	7	8	9	10	Final
(Quebec) Jean-Michel Ménard 🔨	1	0	0	1	0	1	0	2	0	4	9
(Manitoba) Jordon McDonald	0	1	0	0	2	0	2	0	1	0	6

Sheet D	1	2	3	4	5	6	7	8	9	10	Final
(Nova Scotia) Owen Purcell 🔨	0	1	0	0	1	0	1	0	2	1	6
(Manitoba) Braden Calvert	0	0	1	0	0	1	0	3	0	0	5

Sheet E	1	2	3	4	5	6	7	8	9	10	Final
(Ontario) Jayden King 🔨	0	2	0	3	0	0	3	0	1	X	9
(Ontario) Sam Mooibroek	0	0	2	0	1	0	0	2	0	X	5

==== Draw 8 ====
Wednesday, October 22, 2:00 pm

Sheet A	1	2	3	4	5	6	7	8	9	10	Final
(Manitoba) Braden Calvert 🔨	0	0	1	0	3	1	1	3	0	3	12
(Ontario) Jayden King	3	1	0	2	0	0	0	0	3	0	9

Sheet C	1	2	3	4	5	6	7	8	9	10	11	Final
(Manitoba) Jordon McDonald	2	0	1	0	0	1	0	2	1	0	2	9
(Nova Scotia) Owen Purcell 🔨	0	1	0	0	1	0	3	0	0	2	0	7

Sheet D	1	2	3	4	5	6	7	8	9	10	Final
(Ontario) Sam Mooibroek	1	0	1	1	0	1	0	3	0	3	10
(Ontario) Mark Kean 🔨	0	3	0	0	1	0	4	0	1	0	9

Sheet E	1	2	3	4	5	6	7	8	9	10	Final
(Ontario) Scott Howard 🔨	2	0	1	1	0	0	3	0	0	X	7
(Quebec) Jean-Michel Ménard	0	2	0	0	0	1	0	1	0	X	4

==== Draw 9 ====
Wednesday, October 22, 7:00 pm

Sheet B	1	2	3	4	5	6	7	8	9	10	Final
(Ontario) Jayden King	0	1	1	3	1	0	1	1	X	X	8
(Nova Scotia) Owen Purcell 🔨	1	0	0	0	0	2	0	0	X	X	3

Sheet C	1	2	3	4	5	6	7	8	9	10	Final
(Ontario) Mark Kean	0	1	0	2	0	1	0	0	1	0	5
(Quebec) Jean-Michel Ménard 🔨	1	0	1	0	1	0	3	1	0	1	8

==== Draw 10 ====
Thursday, October 23, 9:00 am

Sheet B	1	2	3	4	5	6	7	8	9	10	Final
(Ontario) Sam Mooibroek	0	1	0	0	1	0	1	1	0	0	4
(Manitoba) Braden Calvert 🔨	2	0	0	2	0	1	0	0	0	1	6

Sheet D	1	2	3	4	5	6	7	8	9	10	Final
(Manitoba) Jordon McDonald	0	2	2	0	1	1	1	1	X	X	8
(Ontario) Scott Howard 🔨	1	0	0	1	0	0	0	0	X	X	2

==== Draw 11 ====
Thursday, October 23, 2:00 pm

Sheet C	1	2	3	4	5	6	7	8	9	10	Final
(Ontario) Scott Howard 🔨	1	0	1	0	2	0	0	2	0	0	6
(Manitoba) Braden Calvert	0	2	0	3	0	1	1	0	0	1	8

Sheet D	1	2	3	4	5	6	7	8	9	10	Final
(Quebec) Jean-Michel Ménard 🔨	2	0	1	0	1	0	1	0	3	0	8
(Ontario) Jayden King	0	3	0	2	0	1	0	1	0	3	10

Sheet E	1	2	3	4	5	6	7	8	9	10	Final
(Nova Scotia) Owen Purcell 🔨	3	0	1	0	1	0	2	0	0	2	9
(Ontario) Mark Kean	0	2	0	2	0	1	0	1	1	0	7

==== Draw 12 ====
Thursday, October 23, 7:00 pm

Sheet A	1	2	3	4	5	6	7	8	9	10	Final
(Manitoba) Jordon McDonald	0	2	0	4	0	1	0	2	0	1	10
(Ontario) Sam Mooibroek 🔨	1	0	3	0	1	0	2	0	1	0	8

=== Playoffs ===
Semifinal
2	(Manitoba) Jordon McDonald	5
3	(Ontario) Scott Howard	4

Finals
1	(Manitoba) Braden Calvert	5	8	5
2	(Manitoba) Jordon McDonald	10	5	8

==== Semifinal ====
Friday, October 24, 9:00 am

Sheet C	1	2	3	4	5	6	7	8	9	10	Final
(Manitoba) Jordon McDonald 🔨	0	2	0	0	0	0	0	1	1	1	5
(Ontario) Scott Howard	0	0	2	1	0	1	0	0	0	0	4

Player percentages
(Manitoba) Team McDonald		(Ontario) Team Howard	
Cameron Olafson	80%	Scott Chadwick	91%
Elias Huminicki	68%	Jason Camm	84%
Jacques Gauthier	86%	Mat Camm	94%
Jordon McDonald	81%	Scott Howard	89%
Total	79%	Total	89%

==== Finals ====
===== Game 1 =====
Friday, October 24, 7:00 pm

Sheet C	1	2	3	4	5	6	7	8	9	10	Final
(Manitoba) Braden Calvert 🔨	1	0	2	0	1	0	1	0	X	X	5
(Manitoba) Jordon McDonald	0	3	0	2	0	1	0	4	X	X	10

Player percentages
(Manitoba) Team Calvert		(Manitoba) Team McDonald	
Brendan Bilawka	95%	Cameron Olafson	92%
Kyle Kurz	73%	Elias Huminicki	88%
Corey Chambers	81%	Jacques Gauthier	92%
Braden Calvert	72%	Jordon McDonald	95%
Total	80%	Total	92%

===== Game 2 =====
Saturday, October 25, 2:00 pm

Sheet C	1	2	3	4	5	6	7	8	9	10	Final
(Manitoba) Braden Calvert	0	1	1	0	2	0	1	2	1	X	8
(Manitoba) Jordon McDonald 🔨	0	0	0	3	0	2	0	0	0	X	5

Player percentages
(Manitoba) Team Calvert		(Manitoba) Team McDonald	
Brendan Bilawka	89%	Cameron Olafson	91%
Kyle Kurz	78%	Elias Huminicki	81%
Corey Chambers	85%	Jacques Gauthier	86%
Braden Calvert	87%	Jordon McDonald	64%
Total	84%	Total	81%

===== Game 3 =====
Sunday, October 26, 11:00 am

Sheet C	1	2	3	4	5	6	7	8	9	10	Final
(Manitoba) Braden Calvert	0	2	0	0	1	0	0	2	0	X	5
(Manitoba) Jordon McDonald 🔨	2	0	2	0	0	0	2	0	2	X	8

Player percentages
(Manitoba) Team Calvert		(Manitoba) Team McDonald	
Brendan Bilawka	98%	Cameron Olafson	85%
Kyle Kurz	80%	Elias Huminicki	85%
Corey Chambers	89%	Jacques Gauthier	91%
Braden Calvert	82%	Jordon McDonald	90%
Total	87%	Total	88%

== Women ==
=== Teams ===
Skip	Third	Second	Lead	Alternate	Club
Danielle Inglis	Kira Brunton	Calissa Daly	Cassandra de Groot		Ottawa Hunt & GC, Ottawa, Ontario
Kayla MacMillan	Brittany Tran	Lindsay Dubue	Sarah Loken	Lauren Lenentine	Victoria CC, Victoria, British Columbia
Nancy Martin	Chaelynn Kitz	Kadriana Lott	Christie Gamble		Martensville CC, Martensville, Saskatchewan
Beth Peterson	Kelsey Calvert	Katherine Remillard	Melissa Gordon-Kurz	Brianna Cullen	Assiniboine Memorial CC, Winnipeg, Manitoba
Myla Plett	Alyssa Nedohin	Chloe Fediuk	Allie Iskiw	Abby Whitbread	Saville Community SC, Edmonton, Alberta & Sherwood Park CC, Sherwood Park, Alberta
Krista Scharf	Kendra Lilly	Ashley Sippala	Sarah Potts		Fort William CC, Thunder Bay, Ontario
Selena Sturmay	Danielle Schmiemann	Dezaray Hawes	Paige Papley		Saville Community SC, Edmonton, Alberta
Ashley Thevenot	Stephanie Schmidt	Taylor Stremick	Kaylin Skinner	Susan O'Connor	Martensville CC, Martensville, Saskatchewan

=== Round robin standings ===
Final Round Robin Standings

Key
Teams to Playoffs

Team	W	L	W–L	PF	PA	EW	EL	BE	SE	S%	DSC
(Alberta) Selena Sturmay	5	2	1–0	56	38	35	27	0	12	85%	553.6
(British Columbia) Kayla MacMillan	5	2	0–1	43	36	28	24	10	6	84%	366.3
(Saskatchewan) Ashley Thevenot	4	3	1–0	40	47	27	28	5	9	78%	506.9
(Ontario) Danielle Inglis	4	3	0–1	55	52	33	32	2	11	79%	500.8
(Alberta) Myla Plett	3	4	1–0	48	49	31	29	1	9	79%	325.0
(Ontario) Krista Scharf	3	4	0–1	35	47	26	32	3	7	78%	502.0
(Saskatchewan) Nancy Martin	2	5	1–0	45	51	27	33	3	6	78%	408.7
(Manitoba) Beth Peterson	2	5	0–1	45	47	29	31	2	10	80%	337.5

Round Robin Summary Table
Pos.	Team	(Ontario) ING	(British Columbia) MAC	(Saskatchewan) MAR	(Manitoba) PET	(Alberta) PLE	(Ontario) SCH	(Alberta) STU	(Saskatchewan) THE	Record
4	(Ontario) Danielle Inglis	—	7–9	8–5	8–6	9–8	7–8	9–8	7–8	4–3
2	(British Columbia) Kayla MacMillan	9–7	—	6–4	7–6	4–5	8–2	2–10	7–2	5–2
7	(Saskatchewan) Nancy Martin	5–8	4–6	—	11–7	11–6	3–8	6–7	5–9	2–5
8	(Manitoba) Beth Peterson	6–8	6–7	7–11	—	10–4	6–7	3–8	7–2	2–5
5	(Alberta) Myla Plett	8–9	5–4	6–11	4–10	—	10–2	10–5	5–8	3–4
6	(Ontario) Krista Scharf	8–7	2–8	8–3	7–6	2–10	—	3–7	5–6	3–4
1	(Alberta) Selena Sturmay	8–9	10–2	7–6	8–3	5–10	7–3	—	11–5	5–2
3	(Saskatchewan) Ashley Thevenot	8–7	2–7	9–5	2–7	8–5	6–5	5–11	—	4–3

=== Round robin results ===
All draw times are listed in Atlantic Time (UTC−04:00).

==== Draw 2 ====
Monday, October 20, 2:00 pm

Sheet A	1	2	3	4	5	6	7	8	9	10	Final
(Ontario) Danielle Inglis	1	0	0	0	0	2	2	0	0	4	9
(Alberta) Myla Plett 🔨	0	1	2	1	2	0	0	1	1	0	8

Sheet B	1	2	3	4	5	6	7	8	9	10	Final
(Manitoba) Beth Peterson 🔨	0	1	0	1	0	1	1	0	3	0	7
(Saskatchewan) Nancy Martin	1	0	2	0	2	0	0	3	0	3	11

Sheet D	1	2	3	4	5	6	7	8	9	10	Final
(Ontario) Krista Scharf	0	1	0	0	1	0	1	0	0	X	3
(Alberta) Selena Sturmay 🔨	1	0	1	0	0	2	0	2	1	X	7

Sheet E	1	2	3	4	5	6	7	8	9	10	Final
(Saskatchewan) Ashley Thevenot	0	0	0	1	0	1	0	0	X	X	2
(British Columbia) Kayla MacMillan 🔨	2	0	1	0	2	0	0	2	X	X	7

==== Draw 3 ====
Monday, October 20, 7:00 pm

Sheet D	1	2	3	4	5	6	7	8	9	10	Final
(Saskatchewan) Nancy Martin	0	0	0	2	1	0	0	2	0	0	5
(Saskatchewan) Ashley Thevenot 🔨	0	1	1	0	0	1	1	0	2	3	9

Sheet E	1	2	3	4	5	6	7	8	9	10	Final
(Alberta) Myla Plett 🔨	1	1	1	0	1	1	0	1	4	X	10
(Ontario) Krista Scharf	0	0	0	1	0	0	1	0	0	X	2

==== Draw 4 ====
Tuesday, October 21, 9:00 am

Sheet D	1	2	3	4	5	6	7	8	9	10	Final
(British Columbia) Kayla MacMillan 🔨	1	2	0	2	0	1	0	2	0	1	9
(Ontario) Danielle Inglis	0	0	1	0	2	0	1	0	3	0	7

Sheet E	1	2	3	4	5	6	7	8	9	10	Final
(Manitoba) Beth Peterson 🔨	1	0	1	0	0	0	1	0	0	X	3
(Alberta) Selena Sturmay	0	2	0	1	1	2	0	1	1	X	8

==== Draw 5 ====
Tuesday, October 21, 2:00 pm

Sheet A	1	2	3	4	5	6	7	8	9	10	Final
(Saskatchewan) Nancy Martin	1	0	0	0	0	1	0	0	2	0	4
(British Columbia) Kayla MacMillan 🔨	0	0	3	0	0	0	0	1	0	2	6

Sheet B	1	2	3	4	5	6	7	8	9	10	Final
(Alberta) Myla Plett 🔨	0	2	0	2	2	0	1	0	3	X	10
(Alberta) Selena Sturmay	1	0	1	0	0	2	0	1	0	X	5

Sheet C	1	2	3	4	5	6	7	8	9	10	Final
(Ontario) Krista Scharf 🔨	0	0	0	2	0	2	0	3	0	1	8
(Ontario) Danielle Inglis	0	1	2	0	2	0	1	0	1	0	7

==== Draw 6 ====
Tuesday, October 21, 7:00 pm

Sheet C	1	2	3	4	5	6	7	8	9	10	Final
(Manitoba) Beth Peterson 🔨	0	2	1	1	0	0	1	2	X	X	7
(Saskatchewan) Ashley Thevenot	1	0	0	0	1	0	0	0	X	X	2

==== Draw 7 ====
Wednesday, October 22, 9:00 am

Sheet A	1	2	3	4	5	6	7	8	9	10	Final
(Saskatchewan) Ashley Thevenot 🔨	0	0	1	0	3	0	1	0	0	3	8
(Ontario) Danielle Inglis	0	0	0	1	0	1	0	3	2	0	7

Sheet B	1	2	3	4	5	6	7	8	9	10	Final
(Ontario) Krista Scharf	0	0	0	1	0	1	0	0	X	X	2
(British Columbia) Kayla MacMillan 🔨	0	0	2	0	2	0	3	1	X	X	8

Sheet C	1	2	3	4	5	6	7	8	9	10	Final
(Alberta) Selena Sturmay	0	1	0	2	0	2	0	0	0	2	7
(Saskatchewan) Nancy Martin 🔨	1	0	1	0	1	0	1	1	1	0	6

Sheet D	1	2	3	4	5	6	7	8	9	10	Final
(Alberta) Myla Plett	0	0	0	2	0	2	0	0	X	X	4
(Manitoba) Beth Peterson 🔨	0	4	1	0	2	0	2	1	X	X	10

==== Draw 8 ====
Wednesday, October 22, 2:00 pm

Sheet B	1	2	3	4	5	6	7	8	9	10	Final
(Alberta) Selena Sturmay 🔨	0	2	3	2	0	2	0	2	X	X	11
(Saskatchewan) Ashley Thevenot	1	0	0	0	3	0	1	0	X	X	5

==== Draw 9 ====
Wednesday, October 22, 7:00 pm

Sheet A	1	2	3	4	5	6	7	8	9	10	Final
(Manitoba) Beth Peterson	0	0	0	1	2	0	1	1	1	0	6
(Ontario) Krista Scharf 🔨	2	1	1	0	0	1	0	0	0	1	7

Sheet D	1	2	3	4	5	6	7	8	9	10	Final
(Ontario) Danielle Inglis	0	0	1	0	1	1	1	0	4	X	8
(Saskatchewan) Nancy Martin 🔨	1	2	0	1	0	0	0	1	0	X	5

Sheet E	1	2	3	4	5	6	7	8	9	10	11	Final
(British Columbia) Kayla MacMillan	0	0	0	1	0	0	1	0	1	1	0	4
(Alberta) Myla Plett 🔨	1	0	0	0	2	0	0	1	0	0	1	5

==== Draw 10 ====
Thursday, October 23, 9:00 am

Sheet C	1	2	3	4	5	6	7	8	9	10	Final
(Saskatchewan) Ashley Thevenot	0	2	0	1	1	1	0	2	0	1	8
(Alberta) Myla Plett 🔨	0	0	2	0	0	0	2	0	1	0	5

Sheet E	1	2	3	4	5	6	7	8	9	10	Final
(Ontario) Krista Scharf 🔨	2	1	0	1	1	0	1	2	X	X	8
(Saskatchewan) Nancy Martin	0	0	2	0	0	1	0	0	X	X	3

==== Draw 11 ====
Thursday, October 23, 2:00 pm

Sheet A	1	2	3	4	5	6	7	8	9	10	Final
(British Columbia) Kayla MacMillan	0	0	1	0	0	1	0	0	X	X	2
(Alberta) Selena Sturmay 🔨	2	2	0	1	1	0	3	1	X	X	10

Sheet B	1	2	3	4	5	6	7	8	9	10	Final
(Ontario) Danielle Inglis 🔨	0	1	0	1	1	0	2	0	2	1	8
(Manitoba) Beth Peterson	0	0	2	0	0	1	0	3	0	0	6

==== Draw 12 ====
Thursday, October 23, 7:00 pm

Sheet B	1	2	3	4	5	6	7	8	9	10	Final
(Saskatchewan) Nancy Martin	0	3	0	0	3	0	4	0	1	X	11
(Alberta) Myla Plett 🔨	2	0	1	0	0	1	0	2	0	X	6

Sheet C	1	2	3	4	5	6	7	8	9	10	Final
(British Columbia) Kayla MacMillan 🔨	0	0	0	1	1	0	2	1	0	2	7
(Manitoba) Beth Peterson	0	0	1	0	0	1	0	0	4	0	6

Sheet D	1	2	3	4	5	6	7	8	9	10	Final
(Saskatchewan) Ashley Thevenot 🔨	0	2	0	2	0	0	0	0	1	1	6
(Ontario) Krista Scharf	0	0	2	0	0	1	1	1	0	0	5

Sheet E	1	2	3	4	5	6	7	8	9	10	11	Final
(Alberta) Selena Sturmay 🔨	2	0	3	1	0	0	1	1	0	0	0	8
(Ontario) Danielle Inglis	0	2	0	0	4	1	0	0	0	1	1	9

=== Playoffs ===
Semifinal
2	(British Columbia) Kayla MacMillan	6
3	(Saskatchewan) Ashley Thevenot	4

Finals
1	(Alberta) Selena Sturmay	8	9	9
2	(British Columbia) Kayla MacMillan	5	10	4

==== Semifinal ====
Friday, October 24, 2:00 pm

Sheet C	1	2	3	4	5	6	7	8	9	10	Final
(British Columbia) Kayla MacMillan 🔨	0	0	2	0	0	1	2	0	1	X	6
(Saskatchewan) Ashley Thevenot	0	0	0	0	2	0	0	2	0	X	4

Player percentages
(British Columbia) Team MacMillan		(Saskatchewan) Team Thevenot	
Sarah Loken	88%	Kaylin Skinner	84%
Lindsay Dubue	84%	Taylor Stremick	74%
Brittany Tran	91%	Stephanie Schmidt	78%
Kayla MacMillan	71%	Ashley Thevenot	67%
Total	84%	Total	76%

==== Finals ====
===== Game 1 =====
Saturday, October 25, 9:00 am

Sheet C	1	2	3	4	5	6	7	8	9	10	Final
(Alberta) Selena Sturmay 🔨	0	1	0	2	1	0	3	0	1	X	8
(British Columbia) Kayla MacMillan	0	0	2	0	0	2	0	1	0	X	5

Player percentages
(Alberta) Team Sturmay		(British Columbia) Team MacMillan	
Paige Papley	74%	Sarah Loken	89%
Dezaray Hawes	81%	Lindsay Dubue	70%
Danielle Schmiemann	83%	Brittany Tran	65%
Selena Sturmay	73%	Kayla MacMillan	71%
Total	78%	Total	74%

===== Game 2 =====
Saturday, October 25, 7:00 pm

Sheet C	1	2	3	4	5	6	7	8	9	10	Final
(Alberta) Selena Sturmay 🔨	2	0	1	0	2	0	0	1	2	1	9
(British Columbia) Kayla MacMillan	0	1	0	2	0	2	5	0	0	0	10

Player percentages
(Alberta) Team Sturmay		(British Columbia) Team MacMillan	
Paige Papley	89%	Sarah Loken	84%
Dezaray Hawes	84%	Lindsay Dubue	76%
Danielle Schmiemann	84%	Brittany Tran	80%
Selena Sturmay	71%	Kayla MacMillan	83%
Total	82%	Total	81%

===== Game 3 =====
Sunday, October 26, 4:00 pm

Sheet C	1	2	3	4	5	6	7	8	9	10	Final
(Alberta) Selena Sturmay	0	2	1	1	2	0	3	0	X	X	9
(British Columbia) Kayla MacMillan 🔨	1	0	0	0	0	1	0	2	X	X	4

Player percentages
(Alberta) Team Sturmay		(British Columbia) Team MacMillan	
Paige Papley	84%	Sarah Loken	86%
Dezaray Hawes	81%	Lindsay Dubue	78%
Danielle Schmiemann	86%	Brittany Tran	73%
Selena Sturmay	83%	Kayla MacMillan	56%
Total	84%	Total	73%
