= 2026 Bunge Championship =

Manitoba's men's curling championship

- Host city: Selkirk, Manitoba
- Arena: Selkirk Recreation Complex
- Dates: February 4–8
- Winner: Team Calvert
- Curling club: Heather CC, Winnipeg
- Skip: Braden Calvert
- Third: Corey Chambers
- Second: Kyle Kurz
- Lead: Brendan Bilawka
- Alternate: Rob Gordon
- Finalist: Jordon McDonald

The 2026 Bunge Championship, the provincial men's curling championship for Manitoba was held from February 4 to 8 at the Selkirk Recreation Complex in Selkirk, Manitoba. The winning Braden Calvert rink represented Manitoba at the 2026 Montana's Brier in St. John's, Newfoundland and Labrador.

After Viterra's successful merger with Bunge, Bunge became the official sponsor of the men's provincial championships as Viterra previously was the sponsor since 2016.

Having finished second on the CTRS standings for the 2024–25 season, Team Matt Dunstone earned an automatic berth at the national championship. This means Manitoba will qualify two teams for the Brier.

== Format Change ==
The format of the men's provincial championships was significantly modified for this event compared to previous editions. The following changes were made beginning with this year's event:

- The number of teams qualifying for the event was reduced from 32 to 24. This marks the first time since 1965 that the total number of teams has not been 32 (excluding 2022 due to the COVID-19 pandemic).
- The event will now be a triple knockout instead of a double knockout
- Six teams (two from each bracket) instead of eight will advance to the championship round
- The championship round will now consist of two (2) three team page playoff brackets. The winners of both the A and B brackets will play in the Page 1v2 qualifier. The loser of the 1v2 qualifier will play the C bracket winner in the Page 3v4 qualifier.

== Qualification process ==
Qualification method	Berths	Qualifying team(s)
2025 Provincial Champion	1	Reid Carruthers
2025–26 CTRS Berth	1	Jordon McDonald
MCT Berth	3	Braden Calvert; Steve Irwin; Tanner Lott
Berth Bonspiel	2	Marcus Titchkosky; Brett Walter
Brandon Men's Bonspiel	1	Kelly Marnoch
East Qualifier	1	Derrick Anderson
North Qualifier	1	Butch Mouck
South Qualifier #1	3	Ryan Hyde; Brett Moxham; Jeremy Sundell
South Qualifier #2	1	Stefan Gudmundson
West Qualifier #1	2	Jeff Stewart; Greg Todoruk
West Qualifier #2	2	Cale Dunbar; Jace Freeman
Winnipeg Qualifier	4	Cory Anderson; Daniel Birchard; Justin Richter; Andrew Wickman
Manitoba Open	2	Jay Kinnaird; Cory Naharnie

== Teams ==
The teams are listed as follows:

Skip	Third	Second	Lead	Alternate	Coach	Club
Cory Anderson	Paul Scinocca	Logan Schirrmeister	Justin Reischek	Ted Laing	Don Nelson	Charleswood CC
Derrick Anderson	Wade Ford	Justin Hoplock	Chris Sigurdson			Gimli CC
Daniel Birchard	Kelly Fordyce	Brody Moore	Andrew Peck	Paolo Aquila		Pembina CC
Braden Calvert	Corey Chambers	Kyle Kurz	Brendan Bilawka	Rob Gordon		Heather CC
Reid Carruthers	B.J. Neufeld	Catlin Schneider	Connor Njegovan	Kyle Doering	Rob Meakin	Granite CC
Cale Dunbar	Shayne MacGranachan	Kyle Sambrook	Chris Campbell	Travis Dunbar	Lorne Sambrook	Brandon CC
Jace Freeman	Dallas Burgess	Ryan Ostrowsky	Aaron MacDonell	Emerson Klimpke	Graham Freeman	Virden CC
Stefan Gudmundson	Zane Brandt	Gabe Brandt	Logan Devos	Terry Gudmundson		Steinbach CC
Ryan Hyde	Kenny Keeler	Hartley Vanstone	Eric Leduc	Colin Talbot		Portage CC
Steve Irwin	Travis Taylor	Brayden Stewart	Travis Brooks	Travis Gouldie	Shawn Taylor	Brandon CC
Jay Kinnaird	Cory Zdan	Kris Kinnaird	Brent Hoffman	Tyler Pateman		Virden CC
Tanner Lott	Riley Smith	Adam Flatt	Sean Flatt	Justin Twiss		Fort Rouge CC
Kelly Marnoch	Bart Witherspoon	Branden Jorgensen	Brooks Freeman			Carberry CC
Jordon McDonald	Jacques Gauthier	Elias Huminicki	Cameron Olafson		Bryan Miki	Assiniboine Memorial CC
Butch Mouck	Grant Brown	Justin Katcher	Braxen Huhtala	Shaun Kennedy		Burntwood CC
Brett Moxham	Brady Moxham	Keaton Bachalo	Dean Moxham	Daryl Bachalo		Portage CC
Cory Naharnie	Bryce McEwen	Curtis Connon	David Kammerlock	Mark Franklin		Granite CC
Justin Richter (Note: Team Grassie was skipped by Justin Richter, with Grassie now acting as the team's coach.)	Tyler Drews	Jordan Johnson	Daryl Evans	Rodney Legault	Sean Grassie	Deer Lodge CC
Jeff Stewart	Eric Zamrykut	Geoff Trimble	Alan Christison	Jason Vinnell	Barrie Troop	Gladstone CC
Jeremy Sundell	Elliott Sundell	Paul Sundell	Thomas Huggart			Holland CC
Marcus Titchkosky	Raphael Malo	Myles Friesen	– (Note: Team Titchkosky played with only 3 players.)		Gord Titchkosky	Morden CC
Greg Todoruk	Darcy Todoruk	Rob Fisher	Terron Stykalo			Dauphin CC
Brett Walter	Julien Leduc	Graham McFarlane	Hugh McFarlane			Assiniboine Memorial CC
Andrew Wickman	Jeff Tarko	Sheldon Oshanyk	Cam Barth	Craig Strand		Fort Rouge CC

== Knockout brackets ==
24 team triple knockout with playoff round
Two teams qualify from each A, B, and C Event

=== A event ===
First Knockout	Qualifier 1
Reid Carruthers	8
Greg Todoruk	3	Andrew Wickman	7
Andrew Wickman	7	Reid Carruthers	6
Jace Freeman	5
Jace Freeman	8
Butch Mouck	5	Jeff Stewart	2
Jeff Stewart	8	Reid Carruthers	2
Brett Walter	9
Tanner Lott	9
Jay Kinnaird	2	Marcus Titchkosky	7
Marcus Titchkosky	6	Tanner Lott	6
Brett Walter	11
Brett Walter	5
Jeremy Sundell	8	Jeremy Sundell	2
Cale Dunbar	4

First Knockout	Qualifier 2
Braden Calvert	12
Stefan Gudmundson	6	Ryan Hyde	1
Ryan Hyde	7	Braden Calvert	10
Steve Irwin	1
Steve Irwin	9
Brett Moxham	3	Daniel Birchard	3
Daniel Birchard	9	Braden Calvert	5
Jordon McDonald	8
Team Grassie	3
Cory Naharnie	3	Kelly Marnoch	6
Kelly Marnoch	7	Kelly Marnoch	4
Jordon McDonald	8
Jordon McDonald	9
Derrick Anderson	7	Derrick Anderson	4
Cory Anderson	6

=== B event ===
Second Knockout	Qualifier 3
Greg Todoruk	8
Jeremy Sundell	6	Steve Irwin	7
Greg Todoruk	8	Greg Todoruk	6
Marcus Titchkosky	3
Butch Mouck	4	Reid Carruthers	9
Marcus Titchkosky	6	Steve Irwin	7	Steve Irwin	5
Kelly Marnoch	5
Jay Kinnaird	6
Jeff Stewart	9	Kelly Marnoch	6
Jeff Stewart	7	Jeff Stewart	2
Andrew Wickman	3
Cale Dunbar	5
Andrew Wickman	10

Second Knockout	Qualifier 4
Stefan Gudmundson	8
Derrick Anderson	9	Jace Freeman	8
Derrick Anderson	3	Team Grassie	4
Team Grassie	8
Brett Moxham	4	Braden Calvert	8
Team Grassie	10	Jace Freeman	6	Jace Freeman	2
Tanner Lott	5
Cory Naharnie	5
Daniel Birchard	11	Tanner Lott	9
Daniel Birchard	8	Daniel Birchard	4
Cory Anderson	4
Cory Anderson	9
Ryan Hyde	3

=== C Event ===
Third Knockout	Qualifier 5
Steve Irwin	7
Daniel Birchard	7	Daniel Birchard	2
Marcus Titchkosky	8	Marcus Titchkosky	3	Steve Irwin	10
Jay Kinnaird	11	Jay Kinnaird	0	Tanner Lott	8
Stefan Gudmundson	3	Tanner Lott	10
Jeff Stewart	8	Jeff Stewart	9
Derrick Anderson	4	Jeremy Sundell	2
Jeremy Sundell	6	Jeremy Sundell	9
Cory Naharnie	4

Third Knockout	Qualifier 6
Kelly Marnoch	8
Team Grassie	7	Team Grassie	7
Andrew Wickman	3	Butch Mouck	2	Kelly Marnoch	8
Butch Mouck	14	Butch Mouck	9	Jace Freeman	6
Ryan Hyde	7	Jace Freeman	9
Greg Todoruk	3	Cale Dunbar	2
Cory Anderson	5	Cale Dunbar	7
Cale Dunbar	10	Cale Dunbar	8
Brett Moxham	7

== Knockout Results ==
All draw times listed in Central Time (UTC−06:00).

=== Draw 1 ===
Wednesday, February 4, 8:30 am

Sheet A	1	2	3	4	5	6	7	8	9	10	Final
Cale Dunbar 🔨	0	0	2	0	0	2	0	0	0	X	4
Jeremy Sundell	0	1	0	1	1	0	1	1	3	X	8

Sheet B	1	2	3	4	5	6	7	8	9	10	Final
Andrew Wickman 🔨	0	3	2	0	0	0	1	0	1	X	7
Greg Todoruk	1	0	0	0	0	1	0	1	0	X	3

Sheet C	1	2	3	4	5	6	7	8	9	10	Final
Jay Kinnaird 🔨	1	0	0	1	0	0	0	0	0	0	2
Marcus Titchkosky	0	1	1	0	0	0	1	0	1	2	6

Sheet D	1	2	3	4	5	6	7	8	9	10	Final
Jeff Stewart	0	1	0	1	0	3	1	0	2	X	8
Butch Mouck 🔨	1	0	1	0	1	0	0	2	0	X	5

Sheet E	1	2	3	4	5	6	7	8	9	10	Final
Ryan Hyde 🔨	0	1	0	0	0	1	1	0	1	3	7
Stefan Gudmundson	1	0	0	1	1	0	0	3	0	0	6

=== Draw 2 ===
Wednesday, February 4, 12:15 pm

Sheet A	1	2	3	4	5	6	7	8	9	10	Final
Cory Anderson	1	0	1	1	0	0	2	0	1	0	6
Derrick Anderson	0	3	0	0	0	1	0	2	0	1	7

Sheet B	1	2	3	4	5	6	7	8	9	10	Final
Cory Naharnie	0	0	0	2	0	1	0	0	0	0	3
Kelly Marnoch	0	1	2	0	0	0	0	2	1	1	7

Sheet C	1	2	3	4	5	6	7	8	9	10	Final
Brett Moxham	0	0	0	1	0	2	0	0	0	X	3
Daniel Birchard 🔨	0	1	1	0	2	0	1	2	2	X	9

Sheet D	1	2	3	4	5	6	7	8	9	10	11	Final
Andrew Wickman 🔨	0	1	1	0	2	0	1	1	0	1	0	7
Reid Carruthers	1	0	0	3	0	2	0	0	1	0	1	8

Sheet E	1	2	3	4	5	6	7	8	9	10	Final
Jeff Stewart	0	0	1	0	1	0	0	X	X	X	2
Jace Freeman	1	1	0	2	0	2	2	X	X	X	8

=== Draw 3 ===
Wednesday, February 4, 4:00 pm

Sheet A	1	2	3	4	5	6	7	8	9	10	Final
Marcus Titchkosky	0	0	0	0	2	0	3	1	1	0	7
Tanner Lott 🔨	1	1	2	1	0	3	0	0	0	1	9

Sheet B	1	2	3	4	5	6	7	8	9	10	Final
Brett Walter 🔨	0	0	0	0	3	0	1	1	0	X	5
Jeremy Sundell	0	1	0	0	0	0	0	0	1	X	2

Sheet C	1	2	3	4	5	6	7	8	9	10	Final
Ryan Hyde	0	0	0	1	0	X	X	X	X	X	1
Braden Calvert 🔨	4	3	2	0	3	X	X	X	X	X	12

Sheet D	1	2	3	4	5	6	7	8	9	10	Final
Steve Irwin 🔨	2	0	2	0	0	0	5	X	X	X	9
Daniel Birchard	0	1	0	2	0	0	0	X	X	X	3

Sheet E	1	2	3	4	5	6	7	8	9	10	Final
Team Grassie 🔨	0	2	0	1	0	0	0	0	0	X	3
Kelly Marnoch	0	0	3	0	0	0	0	0	3	X	6

=== Draw 4 ===
Wednesday, February 4, 8:15 pm

Sheet A	1	2	3	4	5	6	7	8	9	10	Final
Butch Mouck 🔨	0	0	1	0	0	0	1	0	2	X	4
Marcus Titchkosky	0	1	0	1	1	1	0	2	0	X	6

Sheet B	1	2	3	4	5	6	7	8	9	10	Final
Jordon McDonald 🔨	0	1	1	1	0	2	0	4	X	X	9
Derrick Anderson	2	0	0	0	1	0	1	0	X	X	4

Sheet C	1	2	3	4	5	6	7	8	9	10	11	Final
Greg Todoruk 🔨	2	0	0	1	0	0	0	1	1	1	2	8
Jeremy Sundell	0	2	0	0	2	1	1	0	0	0	0	6

Sheet D	1	2	3	4	5	6	7	8	9	10	Final
Jeff Stewart 🔨	0	1	0	3	0	2	0	3	0	X	9
Jay Kinnaird	2	0	1	0	1	0	1	0	1	X	6

Sheet E	1	2	3	4	5	6	7	8	9	10	Final
Andrew Wickman 🔨	0	0	1	1	0	3	0	0	2	3	10
Cale Dunbar	0	1	0	0	2	0	1	1	0	0	5

=== Draw 5 ===
Thursday, February 5, 8:30 am

Sheet A	1	2	3	4	5	6	7	8	9	10	Final
Stefan Gudmundson	1	0	0	0	5	0	0	1	0	1	8
Derrick Anderson 🔨	0	0	2	0	0	0	4	0	3	0	9

Sheet B	1	2	3	4	5	6	7	8	9	10	Final
Cory Anderson	3	2	0	2	2	0	X	X	X	X	9
Ryan Hyde 🔨	0	0	2	0	0	1	X	X	X	X	3

Sheet C	1	2	3	4	5	6	7	8	9	10	Final
Reid Carruthers	0	0	2	1	0	1	0	1	0	1	6
Jace Freeman 🔨	1	0	0	0	1	0	1	0	2	0	5

Sheet D	1	2	3	4	5	6	7	8	9	10	Final
Team Grassie	0	1	0	2	0	1	3	1	2	X	10
Brett Moxham 🔨	2	0	1	0	1	0	0	0	0	X	4

Sheet E	1	2	3	4	5	6	7	8	9	10	Final
Cory Naharnie	0	1	0	0	3	0	0	1	X	X	5
Daniel Birchard 🔨	3	0	0	2	0	3	3	0	X	X	11

=== Draw 6 ===
Thursday, February 5, 12:15 pm

Sheet A	1	2	3	4	5	6	7	8	9	10	Final
Andrew Wickman	1	0	2	0	0	0	0	0	X	X	3
Jeff Stewart 🔨	0	3	0	0	0	2	0	2	X	X	7

Sheet B	1	2	3	4	5	6	7	8	9	10	Final
Steve Irwin	0	0	0	0	1	0	0	X	X	X	1
Braden Calvert 🔨	1	0	0	2	0	3	4	X	X	X	10

Sheet C	1	2	3	4	5	6	7	8	9	10	Final
Tanner Lott 🔨	0	1	2	0	2	0	0	1	0	X	6
Brett Walter	3	0	0	1	0	1	2	0	4	X	11

Sheet D	1	2	3	4	5	6	7	8	9	10	Final
Jordon McDonald 🔨	3	0	0	0	1	0	1	0	0	3	8
Kelly Marnoch	0	1	1	0	0	0	0	1	1	0	4

Sheet E	1	2	3	4	5	6	7	8	9	10	Final
Marcus Titchkosky 🔨	0	1	0	0	0	2	0	X	X	X	3
Greg Todoruk	1	0	2	1	2	0	2	X	X	X	8

=== Draw 7 ===
Thursday, February 5, 4:00 pm

Sheet A	1	2	3	4	5	6	7	8	9	10	Final
Jeremy Sundell 🔨	0	0	2	0	0	1	2	0	0	1	6
Cory Naharnie	0	0	0	1	2	0	0	1	0	0	4

Sheet B	1	2	3	4	5	6	7	8	9	10	Final
Stefan Gudmundson	0	0	2	0	0	0	1	0	X	X	3
Jay Kinnaird 🔨	1	2	0	2	1	1	0	4	X	X	11

Sheet C	1	2	3	4	5	6	7	8	9	10	Final
Cory Anderson 🔨	1	0	0	0	2	0	0	1	0	X	4
Daniel Birchard	0	1	1	1	0	2	1	0	2	X	8

Sheet D	1	2	3	4	5	6	7	8	9	10	Final
Ryan Hyde 🔨	1	3	1	0	0	2	0	0	0	X	7
Butch Mouck	0	0	0	3	4	0	3	1	3	X	14

Sheet E	1	2	3	4	5	6	7	8	9	10	Final
Team Grassie	1	0	3	0	2	1	0	1	X	X	8
Derrick Anderson 🔨	0	1	0	1	0	0	1	0	X	X	3

=== Draw 8 ===
Thursday, February 5, 7:45 pm

Sheet A	1	2	3	4	5	6	7	8	9	10	Final
Tanner Lott 🔨	0	1	0	1	0	1	0	1	2	3	9
Daniel Birchard	0	0	1	0	1	0	2	0	0	0	4

Sheet B	1	2	3	4	5	6	7	8	9	10	Final
Cale Dunbar 🔨	1	0	0	2	1	0	3	0	3	X	10
Brett Moxham	0	4	0	0	0	2	0	1	0	X	7

Sheet C	1	2	3	4	5	6	7	8	9	10	Final
Steve Irwin 🔨	1	0	2	0	0	0	1	1	0	2	7
Greg Todoruk	0	1	0	2	0	1	0	0	2	0	6

Sheet D	1	2	3	4	5	6	7	8	9	10	Final
Jace Freeman 🔨	0	0	1	1	0	1	0	2	0	3	8
Team Grassie	0	0	0	0	2	0	1	0	1	0	4

Sheet E	1	2	3	4	5	6	7	8	9	10	Final
Kelly Marnoch	0	0	0	0	1	1	2	0	2	X	6
Jeff Stewart 🔨	0	0	0	1	0	0	0	1	0	X	2

=== Draw 9 ===
Friday, February 6, 8:30 am

Sheet A	1	2	3	4	5	6	7	8	9	10	Final
Jay Kinnaird 🔨	0	0	0	0	0	X	X	X	X	X	0
Marcus Titchkosky	1	3	1	2	1	X	X	X	X	X	8

Sheet B	1	2	3	4	5	6	7	8	9	10	Final
Brett Walter 🔨	2	0	4	0	3	X	X	X	X	X	9
Reid Carruthers	0	1	0	1	0	X	X	X	X	X	2

Sheet C	1	2	3	4	5	6	7	8	9	10	Final
Jordon McDonald	4	0	1	0	0	1	0	2	0	X	8
Braden Calvert 🔨	0	1	0	1	1	0	1	0	1	X	5

Sheet D	1	2	3	4	5	6	7	8	9	10	Final
Derrick Anderson	0	2	0	2	0	0	0	X	X	X	4
Jeremy Sundell 🔨	1	0	3	0	3	1	1	X	X	X	9

Sheet E	1	2	3	4	5	6	7	8	9	10	Final
Andrew Wickman 🔨	0	0	2	0	1	0	0	X	X	X	3
Butch Mouck	1	2	0	4	0	1	1	X	X	X	9

=== Draw 10 ===
Friday, February 6, 12:15 pm

Sheet A	1	2	3	4	5	6	7	8	9	10	Final
Jeff Stewart 🔨	1	0	2	0	3	1	1	X	X	X	8
Jeremy Sundell	0	1	0	1	0	0	0	X	X	X	2

Sheet B	1	2	3	4	5	6	7	8	9	10	Final
Steve Irwin	0	1	0	0	3	1	0	2	0	X	7
Kelly Marnoch 🔨	0	0	0	2	0	0	1	0	2	X	5

Sheet C	1	2	3	4	5	6	7	8	9	10	Final
Tanner Lott	0	0	1	0	0	2	0	2	0	0	5
Jace Freeman 🔨	0	2	0	1	0	0	1	0	1	1	6

Sheet D	1	2	3	4	5	6	7	8	9	10	Final
Cory Anderson	0	0	1	0	0	2	1	0	1	X	5
Cale Dunbar 🔨	2	1	0	2	1	0	0	2	0	X	8

Sheet E	1	2	3	4	5	6	7	8	9	10	Final
Daniel Birchard 🔨	0	1	1	0	1	0	1	0	2	1	7
Marcus Titchkosky	1	0	0	0	0	1	0	1	0	0	3

=== Draw 11 ===
Friday, February 6, 4:00 pm

Sheet A	1	2	3	4	5	6	7	8	9	10	Final
Greg Todoruk 🔨	1	0	0	0	0	1	0	0	1	X	3
Cale Dunbar	0	0	2	0	1	0	0	4	0	X	7

Sheet B	1	2	3	4	5	6	7	8	9	10	Final
Team Grassie 🔨	2	1	0	0	3	0	1	X	X	X	7
Butch Mouck	0	0	1	0	0	1	0	X	X	X	2

Sheet C	1	2	3	4	5	6	7	8	9	10	Final
Reid Carruthers 🔨	2	1	0	2	0	0	3	0	1	X	9
Steve Irwin	0	0	1	0	2	0	0	2	0	X	5

Sheet D	1	2	3	4	5	6	7	8	9	10	Final
Braden Calvert 🔨	3	1	1	0	3	X	X	X	X	X	8
Jace Freeman	0	0	0	2	0	X	X	X	X	X	2

Sheet E	1	2	3	4	5	6	7	8	9	10	Final
Jeff Stewart 🔨	1	0	0	4	0	1	0	1	2	0	9
Tanner Lott	0	2	1	0	2	0	4	0	0	1	10

=== Draw 12 ===
Friday, February 6, 7:45 pm

Sheet A	1	2	3	4	5	6	7	8	9	10	Final
Steve Irwin	0	4	2	1	0	X	X	X	X	X	7
Daniel Birchard 🔨	1	0	0	0	1	X	X	X	X	X	2

Sheet D	1	2	3	4	5	6	7	8	9	10	Final
Kelly Marnoch 🔨	1	0	2	0	2	0	2	0	1	0	8
Team Grassie	0	2	0	1	0	1	0	1	0	2	7

Sheet E	1	2	3	4	5	6	7	8	9	10	Final
Jace Freeman 🔨	0	0	5	0	4	X	X	X	X	X	9
Cale Dunbar	0	0	0	2	0	X	X	X	X	X	2

=== Draw 13 ===
Saturday, February 7, 9:00 am

Sheet C	1	2	3	4	5	6	7	8	9	10	Final
Kelly Marnoch 🔨	0	3	0	1	0	0	1	1	0	2	8
Jace Freeman	0	0	3	0	1	1	0	0	1	0	6

Sheet D	1	2	3	4	5	6	7	8	9	10	11	Final
Steve Irwin	0	1	0	3	0	1	0	1	2	0	2	10
Tanner Lott 🔨	2	0	1	0	2	0	2	0	0	1	0	8

== Championship Round ==
Page 1/2 Qualifier
Q1	Brett Walter	4
Q4	Braden Calvert	10

Page 3/4 Qualifier
Q1	Brett Walter	10
Q5	Steve Irwin	6

Qualified for Playoffs
Braden Calvert	To 1 vs. 2 Page
Brett Walter	To 3 vs. 4 Page

Page 1/2 Qualifier
Q2	Jordon McDonald	6
Q3	Reid Carruthers	2

Page 3/4 Qualifier
Q3	Reid Carruthers	5
Q6	Kelly Marnoch	10

Qualified for Playoffs
Jordon McDonald	To 1 vs. 2 Page
Kelly Marnoch	To 3 vs. 4 Page

=== Page 1/2 Qualifier ===
Friday, February 6, 7:45 pm

Sheet B	1	2	3	4	5	6	7	8	9	10	Final
Jordon McDonald 🔨	0	0	1	0	0	0	2	0	3	X	6
Reid Carruthers	0	0	0	1	0	0	0	1	0	X	2

Sheet C	1	2	3	4	5	6	7	8	9	10	Final
Brett Walter 🔨	0	1	0	1	0	1	0	1	0	X	4
Braden Calvert	1	0	3	0	2	0	1	0	3	X	10

=== Page 3/4 Qualifier ===
Saturday, February 7, 2:00 pm

Sheet C	1	2	3	4	5	6	7	8	9	10	Final
Brett Walter 🔨	2	0	0	1	0	3	0	0	2	2	10
Steve Irwin	0	1	0	0	2	0	0	3	0	0	6

Sheet D	1	2	3	4	5	6	7	8	9	10	Final
Reid Carruthers 🔨	0	2	0	2	0	1	0	0	0	X	5
Kelly Marnoch	1	0	2	0	2	0	1	2	2	X	10

== Playoffs ==
Page playoff system
1	Braden Calvert	8
2	Jordon McDonald	7
3	Brett Walter	8
4	Kelly Marnoch	6

Semifinal
2	Jordon McDonald	10
3	Brett Walter	4

Final
1	Braden Calvert	10
2	Jordon McDonald	7

=== 1 vs. 2 ===
Saturday, February 7, 7:00 pm

Sheet C	1	2	3	4	5	6	7	8	9	10	Final
Braden Calvert	0	2	1	0	0	2	1	0	2	0	8
Jordon McDonald 🔨	2	0	0	2	1	0	0	1	0	1	7

=== 3 vs. 4 ===
Saturday, February 7, 7:00 pm

Sheet B	1	2	3	4	5	6	7	8	9	10	Final
Brett Walter 🔨	0	3	0	0	1	0	2	0	2	0	8
Kelly Marnoch	0	0	1	1	0	1	0	2	0	1	6

=== Semifinal ===
Sunday, February 8, 9:30 am

Sheet C	1	2	3	4	5	6	7	8	9	10	Final
Jordon McDonald 🔨	2	2	0	3	0	3	X	X	X	X	10
Brett Walter	0	0	1	0	3	0	X	X	X	X	4

=== Final ===
Sunday, February 8, 3:00 pm

Sheet C	1	2	3	4	5	6	7	8	9	10	11	Final
Braden Calvert 🔨	2	0	2	0	1	0	0	2	0	0	3	10
Jordon McDonald	0	1	0	1	0	0	2	0	2	1	0	7

2026 Bunge Championship

Braden Calvert
1st Manitoba Provincial Championship title
