= Cameron Olafson =

Canadian curler

- Curler
- Born: October 11, 2003 (age 23); Winnipeg, Manitoba

Team
- Curling club: Assiniboine Memorial CC, Winnipeg
- Skip: Jordon McDonald
- Third: Jacques Gauthier
- Second: Elias Huminicki
- Lead: Cameron Olafson

Curling career
- Member Association: Manitoba
- Top CTRS ranking: 7th (2024–25)
Medal record
Men's curling

Cameron "Cam" Olafson (born October 11, 2003) is a Canadian curler from Winnipeg, Manitoba. He currently is the lead on Team Jordon McDonald.

== Career ==
=== Juniors ===
Olafson would find most of his success during his Junior career as lead for Jordon McDonald. He would first join team McDonald during the 2019–20 season, but unfortunately, due to the COVID-19 pandemic, most junior and youth events were cancelled for the 2019–20 and 2020–21 curling seasons. Starting in the 2021–22 curling season, Team McDonald would win the Manitoba U18 Championship with third Jace Freeman and second Elias Huminicki, where Olafson would represent Manitoba for the first time at the 2022 Canadian U18 Curling Championships. There, Team McDonald would lose in the quarterfinals 5–4 to eventual champions Saskatchewan. Aging out of U18s, McDonald formed a new Junior team for the 2022–23 curling season with Reece Hamm as third, Huminicki as second, and Olafson continuing as lead. In their first season as a new team, McDonald captured the Manitoba Junior Curling Championship. At the 2023 Canadian Junior Curling Championships, McDonald would finish round-robin play with an undefeated 8–0 record, qualifying for the playoffs. After losing to Northern Ontario's Dallas Burgess in the semifinals, McDonald would rebound with a win over Ontario's Landan Rooney 7–4 in the bronze medal game, finishing in third place.

Team McDonald's last year of Junior eligibility was in the 2023–24 curling season, where they would join forces with Burgess from Northern Ontario as their new third. McDonald would win their final Manitoba Junior Curling Championship, and represent as Team Manitoba 1 at the 2024 Canadian Junior Curling Championships. McDonald would again qualify for the playoffs with a 7–1 record after round-robin play, but would lose in the quarterfinals in a rematch of the Manitoba Junior final to Team Manitoba 2, skipped by former U18 teammate Jace Freeman.

=== Men's ===
Team McDonald would stay together as they aged out of junior play beginning in the 2024–25 curling season, where they would start off the season by winning the 2024 U25 NextGen Classic over Jayden King. This win would provide the team direct entry into Curling Canada's NextGen Future program, a new initiative by Curling Canada to help junior teams to transition into the adult ranks by providing them access to Curling Canada's National Coaches, among other benefits. As the U25 NextGen Team, McDonald also participated in the 2024 PointsBet Invitational with Canada's top men's teams based on CTRS Rankings. At the PointsBet Invitational, McDonald would beat top-ranked teams including Matt Dunstone and former world men's champion Kevin Koe, before losing to Brad Gushue 9–7 in the final four. McDonald would continue to have an impressive season, finishing second to Mike McEwen at the 2024 Saville Shootout and winning the MCT Curling Cup. Team McDonald would qualify for the 2025 Manitoba Men's Provincial Championship as one of the top ranked CTRS teams in Manitoba, however would lose to eventual champions Reid Carruthers 8–4 in the playoff round.

Team McDonald would announce in the offseason that Jacques Gauthier would join the McDonald rink as third for the 2025–26 curling season, alongside Huminicki and Olafson. The new team McDonald would start the season playing in the 2025 U25 NextGen Classic but failing to repeat as champions, finishing second after losing 6–4 in the final to Sam Mooibroek. However, Team McDonald would still remain part of Curling Canada's National U-25 NextGen Program. McDonald would again participate in the 2025 PointsBet Invitational, where they would finish 3–1 after round robin play, but fail to qualify for the championship final. Their next event would be the 2025 Canadian Olympic Curling Pre-Trials, where Team McDonald would win the event – beating Manitoba rival Braden Calvert 2 games to 1 in a best-of-three final, qualifying the team for the 2025 Canadian Olympic Curling Trials. At the Olympic Trials, the McDonald rink would finish round robin play with a 1–6 record. During the season, McDonald would participate in his first Tier 1 Grand Slam of Curling event at the 2025 GSOC Tahoe. There, Team McDonald would finish 1–3. They would also play in the 2026 Bunge Championship (the Manitoba provincial men's championship) where they would again face provincial rivals Team Calvert in the final, but this time would lose 10–7 in an extra end, finishing second.

== Personal life ==
Olafson lives in Winnipeg and is currently a Senior accountant at Olafson & Jones. He is a graduate from the University of Manitoba.

== Teams ==
Season(s)	Skip	Third	Second	Lead	Alternate
2019–20	Jordon McDonald	Braxton Kuntz	Alexandre Fontaine	Cameron Olafson	Jaedon Neuert
2021–22	Jordon McDonald	Jace Freeman	Elias Huminicki	Cameron Olafson	
2022–23	Jordon McDonald	Reece Hamm	Elias Huminicki	Cameron Olafson	
2023–24	Jordon McDonald	Dallas Burgess	Elias Huminicki	Cameron Olafson	
2024–25	Jordon McDonald	Dallas Burgess	Elias Huminicki	Cameron Olafson	
2025–26	Jordon McDonald	Jacques Gauthier	Elias Huminicki	Cameron Olafson	
2026–27	Jordon McDonald	Jacques Gauthier	Elias Huminicki	Cameron Olafson	
