= Jordon McDonald =

Canadian curler (born 2003)

- Curler
- Born: July 27, 2003 (age 23); Winnipeg, Manitoba, Canada

Team
- Curling club: Assiniboine Memorial CC, Winnipeg
- Skip: Jordon McDonald
- Third: Jacques Gauthier
- Second: Elias Huminicki
- Lead: Cameron Olafson

Curling career
- Member Association: Manitoba
- Top CTRS ranking: 7th (2024–25)
Medal record
Men's curling

Jordon McDonald (born July 27, 2003) is a Canadian curler from Winnipeg, Manitoba. He currently skips his own team out of the Assiniboine Memorial Curling Club in Winnipeg.

== Career ==
=== Juniors ===
McDonald would first represent Manitoba as the skip at the 2019 Canadian U18 Curling Championships, where his team would finish 7–1 after the Championship Round, qualifying for the playoffs. McDonald would then lose in the semifinals to Ontario, but beat Nova Scotia 4–2 in the bronze medal game to finish third. Unfortunately, due to the COVID-19 pandemic, national junior events were cancelled for the 2019-20 and 2020–21 curling seasons.

Returning to national-level junior curling during the 2021–22 curling season, McDonald would form a new U18 team during his last year of eligibility with third Jace Freeman, second Elias Huminicki, and lead Cameron Olafson where McDonald would again win the Manitoba U18 Championship, representing Manitoba at the 2022 Canadian U18 Curling Championships. McDonald would lose in the quarterfinals 5–4 to eventual champions Saskatchewan. McDonald would also compete with a U20 Junior team with Reece Hamm, Huminicki, Alexandre Fontaine, and Jayden Rutter. They would first compete in the 2021 World Junior Qualification Event, going 3–2 in the round robin, but would lose to Newfoundland and Labrador's Nathan Young in the quarterfinals. McDonald would then go on to win the Manitoba Junior Curling Championship, representing Manitoba at the 2022 Canadian Junior Curling Championships where they would again qualify for the playoffs, finishing round-robin play at the top of their group with a 7–1 record, but would finish 4th after losing the semifinals and bronze medal game to Alberta and Saskatchewan respectively. Aging out of U18s, McDonald then formed a new Junior team for the 2022–23 curling season with members of both his former U18 and U20 teams from the previous season (Hamm, Huminicki, and Olafson). With his new team, McDonald captured another Manitoba Junior Curling Championship. At the 2023 Canadian Junior Curling Championships, McDonald would finish round-robin play with an undefeated 8–0 record, qualifying again for the playoffs. After losing to Northern Ontario's Dallas Burgess in the semifinals, McDonald would rebound with a win over Ontario's Landan Rooney 7–4 in the bronze medal game, finishing in third place.

McDonald's last year of Junior eligibility was in the 2023–24 curling season, where McDonald would join forces with Burgess from Northern Ontario as his new third, alongside Huminicki and Olafson. McDonald would capture his final Manitoba Junior Curling Championship, and represent as Team Manitoba 1 at the 2024 Canadian Junior Curling Championships. McDonald would again qualify for the playoffs with a 7–1 record after round-robin play, but would lose in the quarterfinals in a rematch of the Manitoba Junior final to Team Manitoba 2, skipped by former U18 teammate Jace Freeman.

=== Men's ===
Team McDonald would stay together as they aged out of junior play beginning in the 2024–25 curling season, where they would start off the season by winning the 2024 U25 NextGen Classic over Jayden King. This win would provide the team direct entry into Curling Canada's NextGen Future program, a new initiative by Curling Canada to help junior teams to transition into the adult ranks by providing them access to Curling Canada's National Coaches, among other benefits. As the U25 NextGen Team, McDonald also participated in the 2024 PointsBet Invitational with Canada's top men's teams based on CTRS Rankings. At the PointsBet Invitational, McDonald would beat top-ranked teams including Matt Dunstone and former world men's champion Kevin Koe, before losing to Brad Gushue 9–7 in the final four. McDonald would continue to have an impressive season, finishing second to Mike McEwen at the 2024 Saville Shootout and winning the MCT Curling Cup. Team McDonald would qualify for the 2025 Manitoba Men's Provincial Championship as one of the top ranked CTRS teams in Manitoba, however would lose to eventual champions Reid Carruthers 8–4 in the playoff round.

Team McDonald would announce in the offseason that Jacques Gauthier would join the McDonald rink as third for the 2025–26 curling season, alongside Huminicki and Olafson. The new team McDonald would start the season playing in the 2025 U25 NextGen Classic but failing to repeat as champions, finishing second after losing 6–4 in the final to Sam Mooibroek. However, Team McDonald would still remain part of Curling Canada's National U-25 NextGen Program. McDonald would again participate in the 2025 PointsBet Invitational, where they would finish 3–1 after round robin play, but fail to qualify for the championship final. Their next event would be the 2025 Canadian Olympic Curling Pre-Trials, where Team McDonald would win the event – beating Manitoba rival Braden Calvert 2 games to 1 in a best-of-three final, qualifying the team for the 2025 Canadian Olympic Curling Trials. At 22 years old, McDonald became the youngest skip in history to qualify for the Canadian Olympic Curling Trials. At the Olympic Trials, the McDonald rink would finish round robin play with a 1–6 record. During the season, McDonald would participate in his first Tier 1 Grand Slam of Curling event at the 2025 GSOC Tahoe. There, Team McDonald would finish 1–3. They would also play in the 2026 Bunge Championship (the Manitoba provincial men's championship) where they would again face provincial rivals Team Calvert in the final, but this time would lose 10–7 in an extra end, finishing second.

== Personal life ==
McDonald lives in Winnipeg and is currently (as of 2025) a mechanical engineering student at the University of Manitoba. McDonald is also a Curling Canada "For the Love of Curling Scholarship" recipient in 2021. He also was a member of the University of Manitoba Bisons Varsity Golf team.

== Grand Slam record ==
Key
C	Champion
F	Lost in Final
SF	Lost in Semifinal
QF	Lost in Quarterfinals
R16	Lost in the round of 16
Q	Did not advance to playoffs
T2	Played in Tier 2 event
DNP	Did not participate in event
N/A	Not a Grand Slam event that season

Event	2025–26	2026–27
Masters	T2	Q
National	Q	Q
Open	T2	

== Teams ==
Season	Skip	Third	Second	Lead	Alternate
2017–18	Jordon McDonald	Jaedon Neuert	Braxton Kuntz	Alexandre Fontaine	
2018–19	Jordon McDonald	Jaedon Neuert	Braxton Kuntz	Alexandre Fontaine	
2019–20	Jordon McDonald	Braxton Kuntz	Alexandre Fontaine	Cameron Olafson	Jaedon Neuert
2020–21	Jordon McDonald	Zachary Wasylik	Braxton Kuntz	Alexandre Fontaine	
2021–22	Jordon McDonald (Note: U18 Team)	Jace Freeman	Elias Huminicki	Cameron Olafson	
2021–22	Jordon McDonald (Note: U20 Team)	Reece Hamm	Elias Huminicki	Alexandre Fontaine	Jayden Rutter
2022–23	Jordon McDonald	Reece Hamm	Elias Huminicki	Cameron Olafson	
2023–24	Jordon McDonald	Dallas Burgess	Elias Huminicki	Cameron Olafson	
2024–25	Jordon McDonald	Dallas Burgess	Elias Huminicki	Cameron Olafson	
2025–26	Jordon McDonald	Jacques Gauthier	Elias Huminicki	Cameron Olafson	
2026–27	Jordon McDonald	Jacques Gauthier	Elias Huminicki	Cameron Olafson	
