= 2022 Western Showdown =

- Host city: Swift Current, Saskatchewan
- Arena: Swift Current Curling Club
- Dates: October 13–16 (Women's); October 28–31 (Men's)
- Men's winner: (Sweden) Team Edin
- Curling club: Karlstads CK, Karlstad
- Skip: Oskar Eriksson
- Third: Rasmus Wranå
- Second: Christoffer Sundgren
- Lead: –
- Coach: Fredrik Lindberg
- Finalist: (Alberta) Kevin Koe
- Women's winner: (Switzerland) Team Tirinzoni
- Curling club: CC Aarau, Aarau
- Skip: Silvana Tirinzoni
- Fourth: Alina Pätz
- Second: Carole Howald
- Lead: Briar Schwaller-Hürlimann
- Finalist: (Manitoba) Team Ackland

The 2022 Western Showdown was held from October 13 to 31 at the Swift Current Curling Club in Swift Current, Saskatchewan. The women's event, sponsored by RBC Dominion Securities, ran from October 13 to 16 and the men's event, sponsored by IG Wealth Management, ran from October 28 to 31. The total purse for the event is $45,000 on the women's side and $36,000 on the men's side.

The event was sponsored by Curling Stadium, a streaming service provided by CurlingZone. All of the games were streamed on CurlingZone and the Swift Current Curling Club's YouTube page.

== Men ==
=== Teams ===
The teams are listed as follows:

Skip	Third	Second	Lead	Locale
Daymond Bernath	Bryden Tessier	David Baum	Jack Reid	Saskatoon, Saskatchewan
Braden Calvert	Kyle Kurz	Ian McMillan	Rob Gordon	Winnipeg, Manitoba
Oskar Eriksson (Note: Team Edin played with three players as Niklas Edin was recovering from a knee injury sustained at the 2022 Tour Challenge.)	Rasmus Wranå	Christoffer Sundgren	–	Karlstad, Sweden
John Epping	Mat Camm	Pat Janssen	Scott Chadwick	Toronto, Ontario
Colton Flasch	Catlin Schneider	Kevin Marsh	Dan Marsh	Saskatoon, Saskatchewan
Jacques Gauthier	Sterling Middleton	Jason Ginter	Alex Horvath	Victoria, British Columbia
Kody Hartung	Tyler Hartung	Brady Scharback	Brady Kendel	Saskatoon, Saskatchewan
Jason Jacobson	Jason Ackerman	Jacob Hersikorn	Quinn Hersikorn	Saskatoon, Saskatchewan
Jeong Yeong-seok	Park Jong-duk	Oh Seung-hoon	Seong Ji-hoon	Gangwon, South Korea
Rylan Kleiter	Joshua Mattern	Trevor Johnson	Matthieu Taillon	Saskatoon, Saskatchewan
Kevin Koe	Tyler Tardi	Brad Thiessen	Karrick Martin	Calgary, Alberta
Steve Laycock	Shaun Meachem	Chris Haichert	Brayden Stewart	Saskatoon, Saskatchewan
Scott Manners	Ryan Deis	Kalin Deis	Carter Babij	Lloydminster, Saskatchewan
Dallan Muyres	Garret Springer	Jordan Tardi	Dustin Mikush	Saskatoon, Saskatchewan
Jordan Peters	Andrew Clapham	Zack Bilawka	Cole Chandler	Winnipeg, Manitoba
Aaron Sluchinski	Jeremy Harty	Kerr Drummond	Dylan Webster	Calgary, Alberta

=== Knockout brackets ===
==== A event ====
First Knockout	Qualifier 1
(Sweden) Team Edin	8
(South Korea) Jeong Yeong-seok	7
(Sweden) Team Edin	6
(Saskatchewan) Steve Laycock	5
(Manitoba) Braden Calvert	3
(Saskatchewan) Steve Laycock	8
(Sweden) Team Edin	7
(Ontario) John Epping	5
(Ontario) John Epping	10
(Saskatchewan) Dallan Muyres	1
(Ontario) John Epping	8
(Saskatchewan) Daymond Bernath	2
(Saskatchewan) Kody Hartung	2
(Saskatchewan) Daymond Bernath	7

First Knockout	Qualifier 2
(Saskatchewan) Colton Flasch	8
(Saskatchewan) Scott Manners	1
(Saskatchewan) Colton Flasch	7
(Alberta) Aaron Sluchinski	2
(Alberta) Aaron Sluchinski	8
(Saskatchewan) Jason Jacobson	2
(Saskatchewan) Colton Flasch	4
(British Columbia) Jacques Gauthier	8
(Alberta) Kevin Koe	5
(Manitoba) Jordan Peters	4
(Alberta) Kevin Koe	5
(British Columbia) Jacques Gauthier	7
(Saskatchewan) Rylan Kleiter	2
(British Columbia) Jacques Gauthier	8

==== B event ====
Second Knockout				Qualifier 3
(South Korea) Jeong Yeong-seok	7
(Manitoba) Braden Calvert	4	(South Korea) Jeong Yeong-seok	4
(Saskatchewan) Dallan Muyres	2	(Saskatchewan) Kody Hartung	6
(Saskatchewan) Kody Hartung	8			(Saskatchewan) Kody Hartung	3
				(Saskatchewan) Colton Flasch	7

Second Knockout				Qualifier 4
(Saskatchewan) Scott Manners	9
(Saskatchewan) Jason Jacobson	5	(Saskatchewan) Scott Manners	2
(Manitoba) Jordan Peters	4	(Saskatchewan) Rylan Kleiter	5
(Saskatchewan) Rylan Kleiter	9			(Saskatchewan) Rylan Kleiter	3
				(Ontario) John Epping	10

Second Knockout		Qualifier 5
(Saskatchewan) Steve Laycock	9
(Saskatchewan) Daymond Bernath	3	(Saskatchewan) Steve Laycock	2
(Alberta) Aaron Sluchinski	2	(Alberta) Kevin Koe	7
(Alberta) Kevin Koe	10

==== C event ====
Third Knockout				Qualifier 6
(Manitoba) Braden Calvert	3
(Saskatchewan) Dallan Muyres	8	(Saskatchewan) Dallan Muyres	3
		(Alberta) Aaron Sluchinski	8
				(Alberta) Aaron Sluchinski	5
				(Saskatchewan) Kody Hartung	4

Third Knockout				Qualifier 7
(Saskatchewan) Jason Jacobson	7
(Manitoba) Jordan Peters	6	(Saskatchewan) Jason Jacobson	5
		(Saskatchewan) Daymond Bernath	3
				(Saskatchewan) Jason Jacobson	4
				(Saskatchewan) Rylan Kleiter	7

Third Knockout		Qualifier 8
(South Korea) Jeong Yeong-seok	6
(Saskatchewan) Scott Manners	5	(South Korea) Jeong Yeong-seok	10
		(Saskatchewan) Steve Laycock	5

=== Knockout results ===
All draw times are listed in Mountain Time (UTC−06:00).

==== Draw 1 ====
Friday, October 28, 9:00 am

Sheet 2	1	2	3	4	5	6	7	8	9	Final
(Sweden) Team Edin	2	0	2	0	1	0	2	0	1	8
(South Korea) Jeong Yeong-seok 🔨	0	2	0	1	0	3	0	1	0	7

Sheet 3	1	2	3	4	5	6	7	8	Final
(Manitoba) Braden Calvert	0	1	1	0	1	0	X	X	3
(Saskatchewan) Steve Laycock 🔨	2	0	0	4	0	2	X	X	8

Sheet 4	1	2	3	4	5	6	7	8	Final
(Ontario) John Epping 🔨	3	0	2	1	4	X	X	X	10
(Saskatchewan) Dallan Muyres	0	1	0	0	0	X	X	X	1

Sheet 5	1	2	3	4	5	6	7	8	Final
(Saskatchewan) Kody Hartung	1	0	1	0	0	0	X	X	2
(Saskatchewan) Daymond Bernath 🔨	0	0	0	1	3	3	X	X	7

==== Draw 2 ====
Friday, October 28, 12:30 pm

Sheet 2	1	2	3	4	5	6	7	8	Final
(Saskatchewan) Colton Flasch 🔨	4	2	2	0	X	X	X	X	8
(Saskatchewan) Scott Manners	0	0	0	1	X	X	X	X	1

Sheet 3	1	2	3	4	5	6	7	8	Final
(Alberta) Aaron Sluchinski 🔨	2	1	0	4	1	X	X	X	8
(Saskatchewan) Jason Jacobson	0	0	2	0	0	X	X	X	2

Sheet 4	1	2	3	4	5	6	7	8	Final
(Alberta) Kevin Koe 🔨	1	1	0	0	0	2	0	1	5
(Manitoba) Jordan Peters	0	0	2	1	0	0	1	0	4

Sheet 5	1	2	3	4	5	6	7	8	Final
(Saskatchewan) Rylan Kleiter	1	0	0	1	0	X	X	X	2
(British Columbia) Jacques Gauthier 🔨	0	3	2	0	3	X	X	X	8

==== Draw 3 ====
Friday, October 28, 4:30 pm

Sheet 2	1	2	3	4	5	6	7	8	Final
(Saskatchewan) Dallan Muyres	0	0	0	0	2	0	X	X	2
(Saskatchewan) Kody Hartung 🔨	3	0	0	3	0	2	X	X	8

Sheet 3	1	2	3	4	5	6	7	8	Final
(Ontario) John Epping 🔨	2	1	0	2	0	1	2	X	8
(Saskatchewan) Daymond Bernath	0	0	2	0	0	0	0	X	2

Sheet 4	1	2	3	4	5	6	7	8	Final
(Sweden) Team Edin	0	2	0	2	0	2	0	X	6
(Saskatchewan) Steve Laycock 🔨	1	0	2	0	1	0	1	X	5

Sheet 5	1	2	3	4	5	6	7	8	Final
(South Korea) Jeong Yeong-seok	0	0	3	0	0	4	0	X	7
(Manitoba) Braden Calvert 🔨	0	1	0	2	0	0	1	X	4

==== Draw 4 ====
Friday, October 28, 8:00 pm

Sheet 2	1	2	3	4	5	6	7	8	Final
(Manitoba) Jordan Peters	0	2	0	2	0	0	X	X	4
(Saskatchewan) Rylan Kleiter 🔨	4	0	3	0	0	2	X	X	9

Sheet 3	1	2	3	4	5	6	7	8	Final
(Alberta) Kevin Koe 🔨	0	2	0	0	1	0	2	0	5
(British Columbia) Jacques Gauthier	2	0	0	1	0	2	0	2	7

Sheet 4	1	2	3	4	5	6	7	8	Final
(Saskatchewan) Colton Flasch 🔨	4	0	1	0	2	X	X	X	7
(Alberta) Aaron Sluchinski	0	1	0	1	0	X	X	X	2

Sheet 5	1	2	3	4	5	6	7	8	Final
(Saskatchewan) Scott Manners 🔨	2	0	3	0	1	0	1	2	9
(Saskatchewan) Jason Jacobson	0	1	0	0	0	4	0	0	5

==== Draw 5 ====
Saturday, October 29, 10:00 am

Sheet 2	1	2	3	4	5	6	7	8	Final
(Saskatchewan) Steve Laycock	0	2	0	3	1	3	X	X	9
(Saskatchewan) Daymond Bernath 🔨	1	0	2	0	0	0	X	X	3

Sheet 3	1	2	3	4	5	6	7	8	Final
(Manitoba) Braden Calvert	0	3	0	0	X	X	X	X	3
(Saskatchewan) Dallan Muyres 🔨	2	0	4	2	X	X	X	X	8

Sheet 4	1	2	3	4	5	6	7	8	Final
(South Korea) Jeong Yeong-seok	0	0	1	1	0	0	2	0	4
(Saskatchewan) Kody Hartung 🔨	1	1	0	0	1	2	0	1	6

Sheet 5	1	2	3	4	5	6	7	8	Final
(Sweden) Team Edin 🔨	0	0	3	0	0	1	0	3	7
(Ontario) John Epping	1	1	0	0	2	0	1	0	5

==== Draw 6 ====
Saturday, October 29, 2:00 pm

Sheet 2	1	2	3	4	5	6	7	8	Final
(Alberta) Aaron Sluchinski	0	1	1	0	0	X	X	X	2
(Alberta) Kevin Koe 🔨	2	0	0	4	4	X	X	X	10

Sheet 3	1	2	3	4	5	6	7	8	Final
(Saskatchewan) Jason Jacobson	0	3	0	2	0	1	0	1	7
(Manitoba) Jordan Peters 🔨	1	0	2	0	1	0	2	0	6

Sheet 4	1	2	3	4	5	6	7	8	Final
(Saskatchewan) Scott Manners	0	0	1	0	0	0	1	X	2
(Saskatchewan) Rylan Kleiter 🔨	1	2	0	0	1	1	0	X	5

Sheet 5	1	2	3	4	5	6	7	8	Final
(Saskatchewan) Colton Flasch 🔨	1	0	2	0	0	1	0	X	4
(British Columbia) Jacques Gauthier	0	3	0	1	2	0	2	X	8

==== Draw 7 ====
Saturday, October 29, 7:00 pm

Sheet 2	1	2	3	4	5	6	7	8	Final
(Saskatchewan) Rylan Kleiter	0	1	0	2	0	X	X	X	3
(Ontario) John Epping 🔨	3	0	4	0	3	X	X	X	10

Sheet 3	1	2	3	4	5	6	7	8	Final
(Saskatchewan) Kody Hartung 🔨	2	0	0	0	1	0	0	X	3
(Saskatchewan) Colton Flasch	0	2	0	1	0	3	1	X	7

Sheet 5	1	2	3	4	5	6	7	8	Final
(Saskatchewan) Steve Laycock	0	1	0	1	X	X	X	X	2
(Alberta) Kevin Koe 🔨	5	0	2	0	X	X	X	X	7

==== Draw 8 ====
Sunday, October 30, 10:00 am

Sheet 3	1	2	3	4	5	6	7	8	Final
(South Korea) Jeong Yeong-seok	0	2	1	0	0	0	2	1	6
(Saskatchewan) Scott Manners 🔨	1	0	0	1	1	2	0	0	5

Sheet 4	1	2	3	4	5	6	7	8	Final
(Saskatchewan) Dallan Muyres 🔨	1	0	0	2	0	0	0	X	3
(Alberta) Aaron Sluchinski	0	3	1	0	2	1	2	X	9

Sheet 5	1	2	3	4	5	6	7	8	Final
(Saskatchewan) Jason Jacobson 🔨	1	0	2	0	1	0	0	1	5
(Saskatchewan) Daymond Bernath	0	1	0	1	0	1	0	0	3

==== Draw 9 ====
Sunday, October 30, 2:00 pm

Sheet 2	1	2	3	4	5	6	7	8	Final
(South Korea) Jeong Yeong-seok 🔨	0	3	1	0	0	5	1	X	10
(Saskatchewan) Steve Laycock	1	0	0	2	2	0	0	X	5

Sheet 4	1	2	3	4	5	6	7	8	Final
(Saskatchewan) Jason Jacobson	0	0	1	0	2	0	1	0	4
(Saskatchewan) Rylan Kleiter 🔨	1	1	0	2	0	1	0	2	7

Sheet 5	1	2	3	4	5	6	7	8	Final
(Alberta) Aaron Sluchinski	0	1	0	1	0	2	0	1	5
(Saskatchewan) Kody Hartung 🔨	0	0	1	0	1	0	2	0	4

=== Playoffs ===
Quarterfinals
A1	(Sweden) Team Edin	5
C1	(Alberta) Aaron Sluchinski	3
B1	(Saskatchewan) Colton Flasch	3
C3	(South Korea) Jeong Yeong-seok	4
B2	(Ontario) John Epping	3
B3	(Alberta) Kevin Koe	7
A2	(British Columbia) Jacques Gauthier	8
C2	(Saskatchewan) Rylan Kleiter	7

Semifinals
A1	(Sweden) Team Edin	8
C3	(South Korea) Jeong Yeong-seok	4
B3	(Alberta) Kevin Koe	4
A2	(British Columbia) Jacques Gauthier	2

Final
A1	(Sweden) Team Edin	6
B3	(Alberta) Kevin Koe	3

==== Quarterfinals ====
Sunday, October 30, 7:00 pm

Sheet 2	1	2	3	4	5	6	7	8	9	Final
(British Columbia) Jacques Gauthier 🔨	1	2	0	1	0	0	3	0	1	8
(Saskatchewan) Rylan Kleiter	0	0	0	0	2	1	0	4	0	7

Sheet 3	1	2	3	4	5	6	7	8	Final
(Ontario) John Epping	0	0	1	1	0	1	0	X	3
(Alberta) Kevin Koe 🔨	0	2	0	0	2	0	3	X	7

Sheet 4	1	2	3	4	5	6	7	8	Final
(Sweden) Team Edin 🔨	0	0	1	0	3	0	1	0	5
(Alberta) Aaron Sluchinski	0	0	0	1	0	1	0	1	3

Sheet 5	1	2	3	4	5	6	7	8	Final
(Saskatchewan) Colton Flasch 🔨	0	0	0	2	0	0	0	1	3
(South Korea) Jeong Yeong-seok	0	1	0	0	0	2	1	0	4

==== Semifinals ====
Monday, October 31, 9:00 am

Sheet 2	1	2	3	4	5	6	7	8	Final
(Sweden) Team Edin 🔨	0	1	0	1	0	4	1	1	8
(South Korea) Jeong Yeong-seok	2	0	0	0	2	0	0	0	4

Sheet 4	1	2	3	4	5	6	7	8	Final
(Alberta) Kevin Koe	0	0	0	1	0	1	2	X	4
(British Columbia) Jacques Gauthier 🔨	1	0	0	0	1	0	0	X	2

==== Final ====
Monday, October 31, 1:00 pm

Sheet 3	1	2	3	4	5	6	7	8	Final
(Sweden) Team Edin 🔨	1	0	1	2	0	0	1	1	6
(Alberta) Kevin Koe	0	1	0	0	0	2	0	0	3

== Women ==
=== Teams ===
The teams are listed as follows:

Skip	Third	Second	Lead	Alternate	Locale
Skylar Ackerman	Kya Kennedy	Taylor Stremick	Kaylin Skinner		Saskatoon, Saskatchewan
Meghan Walter	Kelly Schafer (Note: Kelly Schafer spared for Abby Ackland.)	Sara Oliver	Mackenzie Elias		Winnipeg, Manitoba
Sherry Anderson	Patty Hersikorn	Brenda Goertzen	Anita Silvernagle		Saskatoon, Saskatchewan
Penny Barker	Christie Gamble	Jenna Enge	Danielle Sicinski		Moose Jaw, Saskatchewan
Corryn Brown	Erin Pincott	Dezaray Hawes	Samantha Fisher		Kamloops, British Columbia
Stefania Constantini	Marta Lo Deserto	Angela Romei	Giulia Zardini Lacedelli		Cortina d'Ampezzo, Italy
Beth Farmer	Hailey Duff	Kirstin Bousie	Katie McMillan	Amy MacDonald	Stirling, Scotland
Gim Eun-ji	Kim Min-ji	Kim Su-ji	Seol Ye-eun	Seol Ye-ji	Uijeongbu, South Korea
Clancy Grandy	Kayla MacMillan	Lindsay Dubue	Sarah Loken		Vancouver, British Columbia
Ha Seung-youn	Kim Hye-rin	Yang Tae-i	Kim Su-jin		Chuncheon, South Korea
Amber Holland	Kim Schneider	Karlee Korchinski	Debbie Lozinski		Kronau, Saskatchewan
Ashley Howard	Cary-Anne McTaggart	Sara England	Shelby Brandt		Regina, Saskatchewan
Michèle Jäggi	Irene Schori	Stefanie Berset	Sarah Müller	Lara Stocker	Bern, Switzerland
Daniela Jentsch	Emira Abbes	Analena Jentsch	– (Note: Team Jentsch played with three players.)		Füssen, Germany
Selina Witschonke (Fourth)	Elena Mathis	Raphaela Keiser (Skip)	Marina Lörtscher		St. Moritz, Switzerland
Kim Eun-jung	Kim Kyeong-ae	Kim Cho-hi	Kim Seon-yeong	Kim Yeong-mi	Gangneung, South Korea
Madison Kleiter	Chantel Hoag	Rianna Kish	Hanna Johnson		Saskatoon, Saskatchewan
Nancy Martin	Lindsay Bertsch	Jennifer Armstrong	Krysten Karwacki		Saskatoon, Saskatchewan
Rebecca Morrison	Gina Aitken	Sophie Sinclair	Sophie Jackson		Stirling, Scotland
Lisa Parent	Sophie Brissette	Kaitlin Zeller	Megan Johnson		Calgary, Alberta
Robyn Silvernagle (Note: Robyn Silvernagle spared for Beth Peterson.)	Jenna Loder	Katherine Doerksen	Melissa Gordon		Winnipeg, Manitoba
Darcy Robertson	Gaetanne Gauthier	Rachel Kaatz	Kadriana Lott		Winnipeg, Manitoba
Honoka Sasaki	Mari Motohashi	Miki Hayashi	Ayuna Aoki	Mayumi Saito	Kitami, Japan
Stephanie Thompson	Cassidy Regush	Sarah Hoag	Kelly Kay		Regina, Saskatchewan
Alina Pätz (Fourth)	Silvana Tirinzoni (Skip)	Carole Howald	Briar Schwaller-Hürlimann		Aarau, Switzerland
Rhonda Varnes	Janelle Lach	Hallie McCannell	Jolene Callum	Sarah-Jane Sass	Portage la Prairie, Manitoba
Isabella Wranå	Almida de Val	Linda Stenlund	Maria Larsson	Jennie Wåhlin	Sundbyberg, Sweden
Sayaka Yoshimura	Yuna Kotani	Kaho Onodera	Anna Ohmiya	Mina Kobayashi	Sapporo, Japan

=== Knockout brackets ===
==== A event ====
First Knockout	Qualifier 1
(Switzerland) Silvana Tirinzoni	5
(South Korea) Ha Seung-youn	3	(Manitoba) Team Ackland	6
(Manitoba) Team Ackland	6	(Manitoba) Team Ackland	6
(British Columbia) Clancy Grandy	5	(British Columbia) Clancy Grandy	7
(Japan) Honoka Sasaki	2	(British Columbia) Clancy Grandy	9
(Scotland) Beth Farmer	1	(Saskatchewan) Stephanie Thompson	3
(Saskatchewan) Stephanie Thompson	5	(British Columbia) Clancy Grandy	5
(Switzerland) Raphaela Keiser	9	(Switzerland) Raphaela Keiser	4
(Saskatchewan) Madison Kleiter	1	(Switzerland) Raphaela Keiser	9
(Japan) Sayaka Yoshimura	6	(Japan) Sayaka Yoshimura	3
(Scotland) Rebecca Morrison	5	(Switzerland) Raphaela Keiser	6
(Saskatchewan) Amber Holland	3	(Sweden) Isabella Wranå	0
(Italy) Stefania Constantini	10	(Italy) Stefania Constantini	6
(Sweden) Isabella Wranå	7

First Knockout	Qualifier 2
(South Korea) Kim Eun-jung	6
(Saskatchewan) Ashley Howard	5	(Manitoba) Team Peterson	12
(Manitoba) Team Peterson	7	(Manitoba) Team Peterson	6
(Switzerland) Michèle Jäggi	7	(Switzerland) Michèle Jäggi	5
(Manitoba) Rhonda Varnes	0	(Switzerland) Michèle Jäggi	8
(Saskatchewan) Penny Barker	4	(Manitoba) Darcy Robertson	6
(Manitoba) Darcy Robertson	6	(Manitoba) Team Peterson	5
(Germany) Daniela Jentsch	9	(South Korea) Gim Eun-ji	8
(Alberta) Lisa Parent	4	(Germany) Daniela Jentsch	4
(Saskatchewan) Nancy Martin	9	(Saskatchewan) Nancy Martin	6
(Saskatchewan) Sherry Anderson	5	(Saskatchewan) Nancy Martin	4
(British Columbia) Corryn Brown	7	(South Korea) Gim Eun-ji	8
(Saskatchewan) Skylar Ackerman	2	(British Columbia) Corryn Brown	1
(South Korea) Gim Eun-ji	8

==== B event ====
Second Knockout	Qualifier 3
(Japan) Sayaka Yoshimura	9
(South Korea) Ha Seung-youn	8
(Japan) Sayaka Yoshimura	7
(Switzerland) Michèle Jäggi	1
(Japan) Sayaka Yoshimura	6
(Italy) Stefania Constantini	2
(Italy) Stefania Constantini	5
(Japan) Honoka Sasaki	3	(Scotland) Beth Farmer	4
(Scotland) Beth Farmer	6	(Italy) Stefania Constantini	8
(Saskatchewan) Nancy Martin	3
(Japan) Sayaka Yoshimura	4
(Switzerland) Silvana Tirinzoni	6
(Switzerland) Silvana Tirinzoni	6
(Saskatchewan) Madison Kleiter	3	(Scotland) Rebecca Morrison	4
(Scotland) Rebecca Morrison	7	(Switzerland) Silvana Tirinzoni	5
(Saskatchewan) Amber Holland	4
(Saskatchewan) Stephanie Thompson	3
(Saskatchewan) Amber Holland	5
(Switzerland) Silvana Tirinzoni	6
(Switzerland) Raphaela Keiser	4

Second Knockout	Qualifier 4
(Germany) Daniela Jentsch	8
(Saskatchewan) Ashley Howard	2
(Germany) Daniela Jentsch	6
(Manitoba) Team Ackland	8
(Manitoba) Team Ackland	6
(Sweden) Isabella Wranå	5
(British Columbia) Corryn Brown	9
(Manitoba) Rhonda Varnes	5	(Manitoba) Rhonda Varnes	0
(Saskatchewan) Penny Barker	4	(British Columbia) Corryn Brown	2
(Sweden) Isabella Wranå	6
(Manitoba) Team Ackland	6
(South Korea) Kim Eun-jung	5
(South Korea) Kim Eun-jung	7
(Alberta) Lisa Parent	2	(Saskatchewan) Sherry Anderson	1
(Saskatchewan) Sherry Anderson	7	(South Korea) Kim Eun-jung	7
(Saskatchewan) Skylar Ackerman	5
(Manitoba) Darcy Robertson	4
(Saskatchewan) Skylar Ackerman	5
(South Korea) Kim Eun-jung	7
(Manitoba) Team Peterson	3

==== C event ====
Third Knockout	Qualifier 5
(Saskatchewan) Skylar Ackerman	10
(Japan) Honoka Sasaki	7	(Japan) Honoka Sasaki	6
(Saskatchewan) Madison Kleiter	5	(Saskatchewan) Skylar Ackerman	8
(South Korea) Ha Seung-youn	4
(South Korea) Ha Seung-youn	7
(Saskatchewan) Stephanie Thompson	4
(Saskatchewan) Skylar Ackerman	3
(Japan) Sayaka Yoshimura	7

Third Knockout	Qualifier 6
(Manitoba) Rhonda Varnes	7
(Saskatchewan) Sherry Anderson	2	(Manitoba) Rhonda Varnes	4
(Switzerland) Raphaela Keiser	7
(Switzerland) Raphaela Keiser	3
(Germany) Daniela Jentsch	6	(Italy) Stefania Constantini	7
(British Columbia) Corryn Brown	4	(Germany) Daniela Jentsch	5
(Italy) Stefania Constantini	6

Third Knockout	Qualifier 7
(Switzerland) Michèle Jäggi	4
(Saskatchewan) Nancy Martin	8	(Saskatchewan) Nancy Martin	3
(Manitoba) Team Peterson	5
(Manitoba) Team Peterson	8
(Scotland) Beth Farmer	2	(Sweden) Isabella Wranå	1
(Scotland) Rebecca Morrison	4	(Scotland) Rebecca Morrison	5
(Sweden) Isabella Wranå	7

Third Knockout	Qualifier 8
(Saskatchewan) Amber Holland	6
(Saskatchewan) Penny Barker	11	(Saskatchewan) Penny Barker	7
(Alberta) Lisa Parent	4	(Saskatchewan) Penny Barker	7
(Saskatchewan) Ashley Howard	1
(Saskatchewan) Ashley Howard	5
(Manitoba) Darcy Robertson	4
(Saskatchewan) Penny Barker	8
(South Korea) Kim Eun-jung	3

=== Knockout results ===
All draw times are listed in Mountain Time (UTC−06:00).

==== Draw 1 ====
Thursday, October 13, 9:00 am

Sheet 1	1	2	3	4	5	6	7	8	Final
(South Korea) Ha Seung-youn	0	0	0	2	1	0	0	0	3
(Manitoba) Team Ackland 🔨	1	1	0	0	0	2	0	2	6

Sheet 2	1	2	3	4	5	6	7	8	Final
(British Columbia) Clancy Grandy 🔨	1	1	0	1	0	1	1	X	5
(Japan) Honoka Sasaki	0	0	1	0	1	0	0	X	2

Sheet 3	1	2	3	4	5	6	7	8	Final
(Scotland) Beth Farmer	0	0	0	0	0	1	0	X	1
(Saskatchewan) Stephanie Thompson 🔨	1	0	0	1	2	0	1	X	5

Sheet 4	1	2	3	4	5	6	7	8	Final
(Switzerland) Raphaela Keiser	3	0	1	2	3	X	X	X	9
(Saskatchewan) Madison Kleiter 🔨	0	1	0	0	0	X	X	X	1

Sheet 5	1	2	3	4	5	6	7	8	Final
(Japan) Sayaka Yoshimura 🔨	1	0	1	0	0	3	1	0	6
(Scotland) Rebecca Morrison	0	2	0	1	1	0	0	1	5

Sheet 6	1	2	3	4	5	6	7	8	Final
(Saskatchewan) Amber Holland	1	0	0	2	0	0	X	X	3
(Italy) Stefania Constantini 🔨	0	3	1	0	3	3	X	X	10

==== Draw 2 ====
Thursday, October 13, 12:30 pm

Sheet 1	1	2	3	4	5	6	7	8	Final
(Saskatchewan) Ashley Howard	1	0	0	2	0	0	2	0	5
(Manitoba) Team Peterson 🔨	0	1	1	0	2	1	0	2	7

Sheet 2	1	2	3	4	5	6	7	8	Final
(Switzerland) Michèle Jäggi 🔨	0	1	1	1	2	2	X	X	7
(Manitoba) Rhonda Varnes	0	0	0	0	0	0	X	X	0

Sheet 3	1	2	3	4	5	6	7	8	Final
(Saskatchewan) Penny Barker 🔨	1	0	0	1	0	1	1	X	4
(Manitoba) Darcy Robertson	0	3	2	0	1	0	0	X	6

Sheet 4	1	2	3	4	5	6	7	8	Final
(Germany) Daniela Jentsch 🔨	2	0	2	0	5	0	X	X	9
(Alberta) Lisa Parent	0	1	0	1	0	2	X	X	4

Sheet 5	1	2	3	4	5	6	7	8	Final
(Saskatchewan) Nancy Martin 🔨	0	1	0	6	0	2	0	X	9
(Saskatchewan) Sherry Anderson	1	0	2	0	2	0	0	X	5

Sheet 6	1	2	3	4	5	6	7	8	Final
(British Columbia) Corryn Brown 🔨	0	4	0	0	0	2	1	X	7
(Saskatchewan) Skylar Ackerman	0	0	1	1	0	0	0	X	2

==== Draw 3 ====
Thursday, October 13, 4:30 pm

Sheet 1	1	2	3	4	5	6	7	8	Final
(Japan) Honoka Sasaki	0	0	1	0	1	1	0	0	3
(Scotland) Beth Farmer 🔨	0	1	0	3	0	0	1	1	6

Sheet 2	1	2	3	4	5	6	7	8	Final
(Switzerland) Raphaela Keiser	0	1	1	2	0	0	5	X	9
(Japan) Sayaka Yoshimura 🔨	1	0	0	0	1	1	0	X	3

Sheet 3	1	2	3	4	5	6	7	8	Final
(Saskatchewan) Madison Kleiter 🔨	0	1	0	1	0	1	0	X	3
(Scotland) Rebecca Morrison	0	0	3	0	3	0	1	X	7

Sheet 4	1	2	3	4	5	6	7	8	9	Final
(Italy) Stefania Constantini 🔨	2	0	1	1	0	0	2	0	0	6
(Sweden) Isabella Wranå	0	2	0	0	1	1	0	2	1	7

Sheet 5	1	2	3	4	5	6	7	8	9	Final
(Switzerland) Silvana Tirinzoni 🔨	2	0	0	0	2	0	0	1	0	5
(Manitoba) Team Ackland	0	1	1	1	0	1	1	0	1	6

Sheet 6	1	2	3	4	5	6	7	8	Final
(British Columbia) Clancy Grandy 🔨	3	1	2	0	0	3	X	X	9
(Saskatchewan) Stephanie Thompson	0	0	0	2	1	0	X	X	3

==== Draw 4 ====
Thursday, October 13, 8:00 pm

Sheet 1	1	2	3	4	5	6	7	8	Final
(Manitoba) Rhonda Varnes 🔨	1	0	2	0	1	0	0	1	5
(Saskatchewan) Penny Barker	0	1	0	1	0	1	1	0	4

Sheet 2	1	2	3	4	5	6	7	8	Final
(South Korea) Kim Eun-jung	0	1	0	3	0	2	0	0	6
(Manitoba) Team Peterson 🔨	2	0	3	0	2	0	2	3	12

Sheet 3	1	2	3	4	5	6	7	8	Final
(Alberta) Lisa Parent 🔨	1	0	0	0	0	1	X	X	2
(Saskatchewan) Sherry Anderson	0	2	3	1	1	0	X	X	7

Sheet 4	1	2	3	4	5	6	7	8	Final
(Switzerland) Michèle Jäggi	0	0	3	0	2	0	2	1	8
(Manitoba) Darcy Robertson 🔨	2	0	0	2	0	2	0	0	6

Sheet 5	1	2	3	4	5	6	7	8	Final
(British Columbia) Corryn Brown	0	0	0	1	0	0	X	X	1
(South Korea) Gim Eun-ji 🔨	1	1	2	0	1	3	X	X	8

Sheet 6	1	2	3	4	5	6	7	8	Final
(Germany) Daniela Jentsch	0	1	0	0	1	2	0	0	4
(Saskatchewan) Nancy Martin 🔨	1	0	1	1	0	0	2	1	6

==== Draw 5 ====
Friday, October 14, 8:30 am

Sheet 1	1	2	3	4	5	6	7	8	Final
(Manitoba) Darcy Robertson 🔨	1	0	0	1	0	1	1	0	4
(Saskatchewan) Skylar Ackerman	0	1	2	0	1	0	0	1	5

Sheet 2	1	2	3	4	5	6	7	8	Final
(Germany) Daniela Jentsch 🔨	2	1	0	3	0	2	X	X	8
(Saskatchewan) Ashley Howard	0	0	1	0	1	0	X	X	2

Sheet 3	1	2	3	4	5	6	7	8	Final
(Switzerland) Raphaela Keiser 🔨	2	1	2	1	X	X	X	X	6
(Sweden) Isabella Wranå	0	0	0	0	X	X	X	X	0

Sheet 4	1	2	3	4	5	6	7	8	Final
(Manitoba) Team Ackland	0	3	0	1	2	0	0	0	6
(British Columbia) Clancy Grandy 🔨	1	0	2	0	0	1	1	2	7

Sheet 5	1	2	3	4	5	6	7	8	Final
(Saskatchewan) Stephanie Thompson	0	0	1	1	0	0	1	X	3
(Saskatchewan) Amber Holland 🔨	2	0	0	0	2	1	0	X	5

Sheet 6	1	2	3	4	5	6	7	8	Final
(Japan) Sayaka Yoshimura 🔨	2	0	0	2	2	0	0	3	9
(South Korea) Ha Seung-youn	0	5	1	0	0	1	1	0	8

==== Draw 6 ====
Friday, October 14, 12:00 pm

Sheet 1	1	2	3	4	5	6	7	8	9	Final
(Manitoba) Team Peterson 🔨	2	0	0	0	2	0	1	0	1	6
(Switzerland) Michèle Jäggi	0	0	1	1	0	2	0	1	0	5

Sheet 2	1	2	3	4	5	6	7	8	Final
(Switzerland) Silvana Tirinzoni	0	1	0	2	0	0	0	3	6
(Scotland) Rebecca Morrison 🔨	0	0	1	0	1	1	1	0	4

Sheet 3	1	2	3	4	5	6	7	8	Final
(Saskatchewan) Nancy Martin	0	0	1	1	0	2	0	X	4
(South Korea) Gim Eun-ji 🔨	2	1	0	0	1	0	4	X	8

Sheet 4	1	2	3	4	5	6	7	8	Final
(British Columbia) Corryn Brown 🔨	1	1	2	1	4	X	X	X	9
(Manitoba) Rhonda Varnes	0	0	0	0	0	X	X	X	0

Sheet 5	1	2	3	4	5	6	7	8	Final
(Italy) Stefania Constantini	0	0	2	0	0	3	0	X	5
(Scotland) Beth Farmer 🔨	1	1	0	0	1	0	1	X	4

Sheet 6	1	2	3	4	5	6	7	8	Final
(South Korea) Kim Eun-jung 🔨	0	3	1	0	3	X	X	X	7
(Saskatchewan) Sherry Anderson	0	0	0	1	0	X	X	X	1

==== Draw 7 ====
Friday, October 14, 3:30 pm

Sheet 1	1	2	3	4	5	6	7	8	Final
(South Korea) Ha Seung-youn	2	0	2	0	3	0	0	X	7
(Saskatchewan) Stephanie Thompson 🔨	0	1	0	1	0	1	1	X	4

Sheet 2	1	2	3	4	5	6	7	8	Final
(Saskatchewan) Penny Barker	0	3	1	3	1	3	X	X	11
(Alberta) Lisa Parent 🔨	4	0	0	0	0	0	X	X	4

Sheet 3	1	2	3	4	5	6	7	8	Final
(Germany) Daniela Jentsch 🔨	3	0	2	0	0	0	1	0	6
(Manitoba) Team Ackland	0	2	0	3	1	1	0	1	8

Sheet 4	1	2	3	4	5	6	7	8	Final
(Saskatchewan) Ashley Howard	0	0	1	0	3	0	0	1	5
(Manitoba) Darcy Robertson 🔨	0	1	0	2	0	1	0	0	4

Sheet 5	1	2	3	4	5	6	7	8	Final
(British Columbia) Clancy Grandy	0	1	0	1	0	1	1	1	5
(Switzerland) Raphaela Keiser 🔨	2	0	1	0	1	0	0	0	4

Sheet 6	1	2	3	4	5	6	7	8	Final
(Japan) Honoka Sasaki 🔨	0	2	0	4	0	0	0	1	7
(Saskatchewan) Madison Kleiter	0	0	3	0	1	0	1	0	5

==== Draw 8 ====
Friday, October 14, 8:30 pm

Sheet 1	1	2	3	4	5	6	7	8	Final
(Switzerland) Silvana Tirinzoni 🔨	2	0	2	0	0	0	0	1	5
(Saskatchewan) Amber Holland	0	1	0	2	0	1	0	0	4

Sheet 2	1	2	3	4	5	6	7	8	Final
(Manitoba) Team Peterson 🔨	1	0	2	0	2	0	0	X	5
(South Korea) Gim Eun-ji	0	2	0	2	0	2	2	X	8

Sheet 3	1	2	3	4	5	6	7	8	Final
(Japan) Sayaka Yoshimura 🔨	0	1	3	0	0	3	X	X	7
(Switzerland) Michèle Jäggi	0	0	0	1	0	0	X	X	1

Sheet 4	1	2	3	4	5	6	7	8	Final
(Italy) Stefania Constantini 🔨	0	3	0	1	0	2	2	X	8
(Saskatchewan) Nancy Martin	0	0	2	0	1	0	0	X	3

Sheet 5	1	2	3	4	5	6	7	8	Final
(South Korea) Kim Eun-jung	0	2	0	3	0	0	2	X	7
(Saskatchewan) Skylar Ackerman 🔨	1	0	1	0	2	1	0	X	5

Sheet 6	1	2	3	4	5	6	7	8	Final
(British Columbia) Corryn Brown 🔨	1	0	0	1	0	0	0	0	2
(Sweden) Isabella Wranå	0	0	1	0	1	2	0	2	6

==== Draw 9 ====
Saturday, October 15, 9:00 am

Sheet 1	1	2	3	4	5	6	7	8	Final
(Germany) Daniela Jentsch 🔨	1	0	0	1	0	3	0	1	6
(British Columbia) Corryn Brown	0	1	0	0	1	0	2	0	4

Sheet 2	1	2	3	4	5	6	7	8	Final
(Switzerland) Michèle Jäggi 🔨	2	0	0	1	0	0	1	X	4
(Saskatchewan) Nancy Martin	0	0	5	0	1	2	0	X	8

Sheet 3	1	2	3	4	5	6	7	8	Final
(Saskatchewan) Amber Holland 🔨	0	0	1	0	3	0	2	0	6
(Saskatchewan) Penny Barker	0	0	0	4	0	1	0	2	7

Sheet 4	1	2	3	4	5	6	7	8	Final
(Saskatchewan) Skylar Ackerman 🔨	2	0	1	1	0	6	X	X	10
(Japan) Honoka Sasaki	0	1	0	0	5	0	X	X	6

Sheet 5	1	2	3	4	5	6	7	8	Final
(Manitoba) Rhonda Varnes	2	1	1	1	0	2	X	X	7
(Saskatchewan) Sherry Anderson 🔨	0	0	0	0	2	0	X	X	2

Sheet 6	1	2	3	4	5	6	7	8	Final
(Scotland) Beth Farmer 🔨	0	1	0	0	0	1	0	0	2
(Scotland) Rebecca Morrison	0	0	1	1	1	0	0	1	4

==== Draw 10 ====
Saturday, October 15, 12:30 pm

Sheet 1	1	2	3	4	5	6	7	8	Final
(Saskatchewan) Penny Barker	1	0	3	1	2	X	X	X	7
(Saskatchewan) Ashley Howard 🔨	0	1	0	0	0	X	X	X	1

Sheet 2	1	2	3	4	5	6	7	8	9	Final
(Manitoba) Team Ackland	0	0	2	0	0	0	2	1	1	6
(Sweden) Isabella Wranå 🔨	0	3	0	0	1	1	0	0	0	5

Sheet 3	1	2	3	4	5	6	7	8	Final
(Saskatchewan) Skylar Ackerman	0	0	3	3	0	0	1	1	8
(South Korea) Ha Seung-youn 🔨	1	0	0	0	2	1	0	0	4

Sheet 4	1	2	3	4	5	6	7	8	Final
(Switzerland) Silvana Tirinzoni	0	1	1	0	1	0	2	1	6
(Switzerland) Raphaela Keiser 🔨	2	0	0	1	0	1	0	0	4

Sheet 5	1	2	3	4	5	6	7	8	Final
(Japan) Sayaka Yoshimura 🔨	0	0	2	0	0	2	2	X	6
(Italy) Stefania Constantini	0	0	0	2	0	0	0	X	2

Sheet 6	1	2	3	4	5	6	7	8	Final
(South Korea) Kim Eun-jung	0	0	4	2	0	1	X	X	7
(Manitoba) Team Peterson 🔨	0	1	0	0	2	0	X	X	3

==== Draw 11 ====
Saturday, October 15, 4:30 pm

Sheet 1	1	2	3	4	5	6	7	8	Final
(Scotland) Rebecca Morrison	0	2	0	0	1	0	2	0	5
(Sweden) Isabella Wranå 🔨	1	0	2	1	0	2	0	1	7

Sheet 2	1	2	3	4	5	6	7	8	Final
(Japan) Sayaka Yoshimura	0	0	0	1	0	2	1	0	4
(Switzerland) Silvana Tirinzoni 🔨	0	2	1	0	1	0	0	2	6

Sheet 3	1	2	3	4	5	6	7	8	9	Final
(Germany) Daniela Jentsch 🔨	0	0	0	1	1	0	2	1	0	5
(Italy) Stefania Constantini	0	0	2	0	0	3	0	0	1	6

Sheet 4	1	2	3	4	5	6	7	8	Final
(Manitoba) Team Ackland 🔨	1	1	0	3	0	0	0	1	6
(South Korea) Kim Eun-jung	0	0	2	0	0	2	1	0	5

Sheet 5	1	2	3	4	5	6	7	8	Final
(Saskatchewan) Nancy Martin 🔨	1	0	1	0	1	0	0	X	3
(Manitoba) Team Peterson	0	1	0	1	0	2	1	X	5

Sheet 6	1	2	3	4	5	6	7	8	Final
(Manitoba) Rhonda Varnes 🔨	0	0	2	0	0	2	0	X	4
(Switzerland) Raphaela Keiser	0	2	0	1	2	0	2	X	7

==== Draw 12 ====
Saturday, October 15, 8:00 pm

Sheet 2	1	2	3	4	5	6	7	8	Final
(Switzerland) Raphaela Keiser 🔨	0	1	0	0	0	2	0	X	3
(Italy) Stefania Constantini	1	0	2	1	2	0	1	X	7

Sheet 3	1	2	3	4	5	6	7	8	Final
(Saskatchewan) Penny Barker 🔨	1	1	3	0	2	0	1	X	8
(South Korea) Kim Eun-jung	0	0	0	2	0	1	0	X	3

Sheet 4	1	2	3	4	5	6	7	8	Final
(Manitoba) Team Peterson 🔨	2	1	0	0	5	X	X	X	8
(Sweden) Isabella Wranå	0	0	0	1	0	X	X	X	1

Sheet 5	1	2	3	4	5	6	7	8	Final
(Saskatchewan) Skylar Ackerman	0	0	0	2	0	1	0	X	3
(Japan) Sayaka Yoshimura 🔨	2	2	1	0	1	0	1	X	7

=== Playoffs ===
Quarterfinals
A1	(British Columbia) Clancy Grandy	2
C3	(Manitoba) Team Peterson	5
B1	(Switzerland) Silvana Tirinzoni	4
C4	(Saskatchewan) Penny Barker	2
B2	(Manitoba) Team Ackland	5
C1	(Japan) Sayaka Yoshimura	3
A2	(South Korea) Gim Eun-ji	2
C2	(Italy) Stefania Constantini	4

Semifinals
C3	(Manitoba) Team Peterson	1
B1	(Switzerland) Silvana Tirinzoni	6
B2	(Manitoba) Team Ackland	4
C2	(Italy) Stefania Constantini	2

Final
B1	(Switzerland) Silvana Tirinzoni	8
B2	(Manitoba) Team Ackland	1

==== Quarterfinals ====
Sunday, October 16, 9:00 am

Sheet 2	1	2	3	4	5	6	7	8	Final
(Manitoba) Team Ackland 🔨	0	0	0	2	0	0	2	1	5
(Japan) Sayaka Yoshimura	0	0	0	0	0	3	0	0	3

Sheet 3	1	2	3	4	5	6	7	8	Final
(British Columbia) Clancy Grandy 🔨	1	0	0	1	0	0	0	X	2
(Manitoba) Team Peterson	0	1	0	0	2	1	1	X	5

Sheet 4	1	2	3	4	5	6	7	8	Final
(Switzerland) Silvana Tirinzoni 🔨	1	1	1	0	0	0	1	X	4
(Saskatchewan) Penny Barker	0	0	0	2	0	0	0	X	2

Sheet 5	1	2	3	4	5	6	7	8	Final
(South Korea) Gim Eun-ji 🔨	0	1	0	1	0	0	0	X	2
(Italy) Stefania Constantini	0	0	1	0	0	2	1	X	4

==== Semifinals ====
Sunday, October 16, 12:30 pm

Sheet 2	1	2	3	4	5	6	7	8	Final
(Manitoba) Team Peterson	0	1	0	0	0	0	0	X	1
(Switzerland) Silvana Tirinzoni 🔨	0	0	1	1	1	1	2	X	6

Sheet 4	1	2	3	4	5	6	7	8	Final
(Manitoba) Team Ackland 🔨	0	0	0	2	0	2	0	X	4
(Italy) Stefania Constantini	0	0	1	0	1	0	0	X	2

==== Final ====
Sunday, October 16, 4:00 pm

Sheet 3	1	2	3	4	5	6	7	8	Final
(Switzerland) Silvana Tirinzoni 🔨	0	1	0	0	5	2	X	X	8
(Manitoba) Team Ackland	0	0	1	0	0	0	X	X	1
