= 2019 Canadian Junior Curling Championships – Men's tournament =

2019 Canadian Junior Curling Championships Men's tournament
- Host city: Prince Albert, Saskatchewan
- Arena: Art Hauser Centre; Prince Albert Golf & Curling Club
- Dates: January 19–27
- Winner: British Columbia
- Curling club: Langley Curling Club & Victoria Curling Club
- Skip: Tyler Tardi
- Third: Sterling Middleton
- Second: Matthew Hall
- Lead: Alex Horvath
- Coach: Paul Tardi
- Finalist: Manitoba (J.T. Ryan)

The men's tournament of the 2019 New Holland Canadian Junior Curling Championships was held from January 19 to 27 at the Art Hauser Centre and the Prince Albert Golf & Curling Club.

== Teams ==
The teams are listed as follows:

Province / Territory	Skip	Third	Second	Lead	Club(s)
Alberta	Desmond Young	Dustin Mikush	Jacob Libbus	Gabriel Dyck	Saville Community Sports Centre
British Columbia	Tyler Tardi	Sterling Middleton	Matthew Hall	Alex Horvath	Langley Curling Club Victoria Curling Club
Manitoba	J.T. Ryan	Jacques Gauthier	Jordan Peters	Cole Chandler	Assiniboine Memorial Curling Club
New Brunswick	Jack Smeltzer	Michael Donovan	Donovan Lanteigne	Alex Gallant	Capital Winter Club
Newfoundland and Labrador	Greg Blyde	Daniel Bruce	Ryan McNeil Lamswood	Nathan King	St. John's Curling Club
Northern Ontario	Tanner Horgan	Jacob Horgan	Max Cull	Maxime Blais	Curl Sudbury
Northwest Territories	Sawer Kaeser	Tristan MacPherson	Garret Minute	Caleb Brake	Fort Smith Curling Centre
Nova Scotia	Owen Purcell (Fourth)	Graeme Weagle (Skip)	Jeffrey Meagher	Brett Dorey	Chester Curling Club
Nunavut	Javen Komaksiutiksak	David Aglukark	Jason Panikaladjuak	Calvin Laforet	Iqaluit Curling Club
Ontario	Samuel Steep	Adam Vincent	Oliver Campbell	Emerson Steffler	Galt Country Club
Prince Edward Island	Tyler Smith	Ryan Abraham	Alex MacFadyen	Ryan Lowery	Charlottetown Curling Complex
Quebec	Vincent Roberge	Jesse Mullen	Simon-Olivier Hebert	Bradley Lequin	Club de curling Etchemin
Saskatchewan	Rylan Kleiter	Trevor Johnson	Joshua Mattern	Matthieu Taillon	Sutherland Curling Club
Yukon	Trygg Jensen	William Klassen	Alexander Kopan	Alexander Schultz	Whitehorse Curling Club

== Round-robin standings ==
Key
Teams to championship pool
Teams to tiebreakers

Pool A	Skip	W	L
British Columbia	Tyler Tardi	6	0
Saskatchewan	Rylan Kleiter	5	1
Newfoundland and Labrador	Greg Blyde	3	3
Alberta	Desmond Young	3	3
Ontario	Samuel Steep	3	3
Yukon	Trygg Jensen	1	5
Nunavut	Javen Komaksiutiksak	0	6

Pool B	Skip	W	L
Manitoba	J.T. Ryan	4	2
Northern Ontario	Tanner Horgan	4	2
Nova Scotia	Graeme Weagle	4	2
Quebec	Vincent Roberge	4	2
New Brunswick	Jack Smeltzer	3	3
Prince Edward Island	Tyler Smith	2	4
Northwest Territories	Sawer Kaeser	0	6

== Round-robin results ==
All draw times are listed in Eastern Standard Time (UTC−5:00).

=== Pool A ===
==== Draw 1 ====
Saturday, January 19, 10:00

Sheet A	1	2	3	4	5	6	7	8	9	10	Final
Yukon (Jensen)	0	0	0	1	0	0	1	0	X	X	2
British Columbia (Tardi)	0	2	0	0	2	2	0	4	X	X	10

Sheet B	1	2	3	4	5	6	7	8	9	10	Final
Alberta (Young)	1	0	1	0	2	0	0	3	0	1	8
Newfoundland and Labrador (Blyde)	0	1	0	1	0	2	0	0	2	0	6

==== Draw 2 ====
Saturday, January 19, 15:00

Sheet E	1	2	3	4	5	6	7	8	9	10	Final
Nunavut (Komaksiutiksak)	0	0	1	0	1	0	0	1	X	X	3
Saskatchewan (Kleiter)	2	3	0	4	0	3	0	0	X	X	12

Sheet I	1	2	3	4	5	6	7	8	9	10	11	12	Final
Ontario (Steep)	0	0	2	0	0	1	1	0	0	3	0	1	8
Alberta (Young)	0	0	0	2	2	0	0	1	2	0	0	0	7

==== Draw 3 ====
Saturday, January 19, 20:30

Sheet D	1	2	3	4	5	6	7	8	9	10	Final
Saskatchewan (Kleiter)	0	2	0	2	1	3	0	0	X	X	8
Ontario (Steep)	0	0	0	0	0	0	1	1	X	X	2

Sheet F	1	2	3	4	5	6	7	8	9	10	Final
British Columbia (Tardi)	3	3	5	0	0	0	2	1	X	X	14
Nunavut (Komaksiutiksak)	0	0	0	0	0	1	0	0	X	X	1

==== Draw 4 ====
Sunday, January 20, 10:00

Sheet C	1	2	3	4	5	6	7	8	9	10	Final
Newfoundland and Labrador (Blyde)	3	1	2	0	0	4	0	1	X	X	11
Yukon (Jensen)	0	0	0	1	1	0	2	0	X	X	4

==== Draw 5 ====
Sunday, January 20, 15:00

Sheet A	1	2	3	4	5	6	7	8	9	10	11	Final
Saskatchewan (Kleiter)	0	0	1	0	2	0	0	2	1	0	1	7
Alberta (Young)	0	1	0	1	0	1	1	0	0	2	0	6

Sheet F	1	2	3	4	5	6	7	8	9	10	Final
Ontario (Steep)	0	2	0	1	0	0	2	0	1	X	6
Newfoundland and Labrador (Blyde)	1	0	2	0	2	0	0	3	0	X	8

==== Draw 6 ====
Sunday, January 20, 20:00

Sheet B	1	2	3	4	5	6	7	8	9	10	Final
British Columbia (Tardi)	0	2	1	0	1	1	0	0	0	X	5
Saskatchewan (Kleiter)	1	0	0	0	0	0	0	2	0	X	3

Sheet H	1	2	3	4	5	6	7	8	9	10	Final
Yukon (Jensen)	3	0	4	0	4	0	0	4	X	X	15
Nunavut (Komaksiutiksak)	0	1	0	1	0	1	0	0	X	X	3

==== Draw 7 ====
Monday, January 21, 10:00

Sheet D	1	2	3	4	5	6	7	8	9	10	Final
Newfoundland and Labrador (Blyde)	0	0	0	0	2	0	2	0	X	X	4
British Columbia (Tardi)	0	0	2	5	0	3	0	2	X	X	12

Sheet E	1	2	3	4	5	6	7	8	9	10	Final
Alberta (Young)	0	4	1	0	3	0	2	0	X	X	10
Yukon (Jensen)	0	0	0	1	0	1	0	0	X	X	2

==== Draw 8 ====
Monday, January 21, 15:00

Sheet C	1	2	3	4	5	6	7	8	9	10	Final
Nunavut (Komaksiutiksak)	0	0	1	0	0	2	0	0	X	X	3
Ontario (Steep)	7	1	0	0	2	0	5	1	X	X	16

==== Draw 9 ====
Monday, January 21, 20:00

Sheet B	1	2	3	4	5	6	7	8	9	10	Final
Ontario (Steep)	0	0	0	0	1	0	2	0	2	X	5
Yukon (Jensen)	0	0	1	0	0	0	0	0	0	X	1

Sheet I	1	2	3	4	5	6	7	8	9	10	Final
Saskatchewan (Kleiter)	2	2	0	0	1	0	0	3	0	X	8
Newfoundland and Labrador (Blyde)	0	0	2	1	0	2	0	0	1	X	6

==== Draw 10 ====
Tuesday, January 22, 10:00

Sheet D	1	2	3	4	5	6	7	8	9	10	Final
Nunavut (Komaksiutiksak)	2	0	1	0	0	1	0	1	X	X	5
Alberta (Young)	0	2	0	3	4	0	2	0	X	X	11

Sheet E	1	2	3	4	5	6	7	8	9	10	Final
British Columbia (Tardi)	2	3	3	1	0	0	0	3	X	X	12
Ontario (Steep)	0	0	0	0	1	1	0	0	X	X	2

==== Draw 12 ====
Tuesday, January 22, 20:00

Sheet A	1	2	3	4	5	6	7	8	9	10	Final
Newfoundland and Labrador (Blyde)	3	2	0	3	1	2	0	1	X	X	12
Nunavut (Komaksiutiksak)	0	0	2	0	0	0	1	0	X	X	3

Sheet C	1	2	3	4	5	6	7	8	9	10	Final
Alberta (Young)	0	0	1	1	1	0	1	0	2	X	6
British Columbia (Tardi)	4	1	0	0	0	0	0	4	0	X	9

Sheet G	1	2	3	4	5	6	7	8	9	10	Final
Yukon (Jensen)	0	0	1	0	0	1	0	0	0	X	2
Saskatchewan (Kleiter)	2	1	0	0	1	0	1	0	5	X	10

=== Pool B ===
==== Draw 1 ====
Saturday, January 19, 10:00

Sheet C	1	2	3	4	5	6	7	8	9	10	Final
Quebec (Roberge)	0	0	0	0	0	2	0	0	1	X	3
Manitoba (Ryan)	0	2	1	0	1	0	0	2	0	X	6

Sheet D	1	2	3	4	5	6	7	8	9	10	Final
Nova Scotia (Weagle)	1	0	1	0	0	0	0	2	2	0	6
Northern Ontario (Horgan)	0	2	0	0	1	1	1	0	0	2	7

==== Draw 2 ====
Saturday, January 19, 15:00

Sheet F	1	2	3	4	5	6	7	8	9	10	Final
Northwest Territories (Kaeser)	1	0	0	1	0	0	0	0	X	X	2
New Brunswick (Smeltzer)	0	2	0	0	4	0	0	1	X	X	7

==== Draw 3 ====
Saturday, January 19, 20:30

Sheet A	1	2	3	4	5	6	7	8	9	10	Final
Manitoba (Ryan)	4	2	0	0	1	0	0	2	X	X	9
Northwest Territories (Kaeser)	0	0	1	0	0	1	0	0	X	X	2

Sheet B	1	2	3	4	5	6	7	8	9	10	Final
Prince Edward Island (Smith)	2	1	0	3	1	0	0	1	0	1	9
Quebec (Roberge)	0	0	2	0	0	3	1	0	1	0	7

==== Draw 4 ====
Sunday, January 20, 10:00

Sheet E	1	2	3	4	5	6	7	8	9	10	Final
New Brunswick (Smeltzer)	1	0	0	1	0	1	0	1	1	X	5
Nova Scotia (Weagle)	0	3	1	0	3	0	1	0	0	X	8

==== Draw 5 ====
Sunday, January 20, 15:00

Sheet H	1	2	3	4	5	6	7	8	9	10	Final
Northern Ontario (Horgan)	1	0	0	2	0	2	0	1	0	1	7
Prince Edward Island (Smith)	0	1	1	0	2	0	1	0	1	0	6

==== Draw 6 ====
Sunday, January 20, 20:00

Sheet C	1	2	3	4	5	6	7	8	9	10	Final
New Brunswick (Smeltzer)	0	1	0	3	2	3	0	0	2	X	11
Northern Ontario (Horgan)	1	0	3	0	0	0	2	1	0	X	7

Sheet D	1	2	3	4	5	6	7	8	9	10	Final
Quebec (Roberge)	4	2	0	2	1	0	1	1	X	X	11
Northwest Territories (Kaeser)	0	0	1	0	0	1	0	0	X	X	2

Sheet E	1	2	3	4	5	6	7	8	9	10	Final
Prince Edward Island (Smith)	0	0	0	2	0	0	1	0	0	X	3
Manitoba (Ryan)	0	1	1	0	2	1	0	1	1	X	7

==== Draw 7 ====
Monday, January 21, 10:00

Sheet A	1	2	3	4	5	6	7	8	9	10	Final
Nova Scotia (Weagle)	0	2	0	1	0	3	1	0	2	X	9
Prince Edward Island (Smith)	1	0	1	0	4	0	0	1	0	X	7

==== Draw 8 ====
Monday, January 21, 15:00

Sheet B	1	2	3	4	5	6	7	8	9	10	Final
Northwest Territories (Kaeser)	0	0	0	2	0	0	1	0	X	X	3
Nova Scotia (Weagle)	2	3	2	0	4	1	0	0	X	X	12

==== Draw 9 ====
Monday, January 21, 20:00

Sheet C	1	2	3	4	5	6	7	8	9	10	Final
Prince Edward Island (Smith)	4	0	4	0	2	0	3	0	X	X	13
Northwest Territories (Kaeser)	0	1	0	1	0	1	0	1	X	X	4

Sheet F	1	2	3	4	5	6	7	8	9	10	Final
Northern Ontario (Horgan)	1	0	0	0	1	0	0	1	X	X	3
Quebec (Roberge)	0	3	1	2	0	0	2	0	X	X	8

Sheet H	1	2	3	4	5	6	7	8	9	10	Final
Manitoba (Ryan)	2	0	2	0	2	0	1	0	1	X	8
New Brunswick (Smeltzer)	0	1	0	2	0	1	0	1	0	X	5

==== Draw 11 ====
Tuesday, January 22, 15:00

Sheet A	1	2	3	4	5	6	7	8	9	10	Final
Quebec (Roberge)	0	2	0	1	0	1	1	0	1	1	7
New Brunswick (Smeltzer)	0	0	1	0	1	0	0	2	0	0	4

Sheet E	1	2	3	4	5	6	7	8	9	10	Final
Northwest Territories (Kaeser)	0	1	0	1	0	1	0	0	X	X	3
Northern Ontario (Horgan)	4	0	2	0	4	0	5	1	X	X	16

Sheet F	1	2	3	4	5	6	7	8	9	10	Final
Manitoba (Ryan)	1	1	0	0	0	1	0	1	0	0	4
Nova Scotia (Weagle)	0	0	1	2	0	0	2	0	1	1	7

==== Draw 12 ====
Tuesday, January 22, 20:00

Sheet B	1	2	3	4	5	6	7	8	9	10	Final
Northern Ontario (Horgan)	1	1	0	1	0	1	0	0	2	1	7
Manitoba (Ryan)	0	0	1	0	2	0	0	1	0	0	4

Sheet D	1	2	3	4	5	6	7	8	9	10	Final
New Brunswick (Smeltzer)	1	0	0	2	0	3	0	0	1	2	9
Prince Edward Island (Smith)	0	1	2	0	3	0	0	1	0	0	7

Sheet H	1	2	3	4	5	6	7	8	9	10	Final
Nova Scotia (Weagle)	0	0	1	0	1	0	0	1	X	X	3
Quebec (Roberge)	2	0	0	4	0	1	2	0	X	X	9

==== Tiebreaker ====
Wednesday, January 23, 09:00

Sheet C	1	2	3	4	5	6	7	8	9	10	Final
Alberta (Young)	0	1	0	1	0	0	0	2	0	1	5
Ontario (Steep)	1	0	2	0	0	1	0	0	0	0	4

== Placement round ==
=== Seeding pool ===
==== Standings ====
Team	Skip	W	L
New Brunswick	Jack Smeltzer	6	3
Ontario	Samuel Steep	5	4
Prince Edward Island	Tyler Smith	4	5
Yukon	Trygg Jensen	2	7
Northwest Territories	Sawer Kaeser	1	8
Nunavut	Javen Komaksiutiksak	0	9

==== Draw 14 ====
Wednesday, January 23, 14:00

Sheet H	1	2	3	4	5	6	7	8	9	10	Final
Ontario (Steep)	1	2	2	0	2	0	1	0	0	3	11
Prince Edward Island (Smith)	0	0	0	3	0	1	0	2	1	0	7

==== Draw 15 ====
Wednesday, January 23, 19:00

Sheet D	1	2	3	4	5	6	7	8	9	10	Final
Yukon (Jensen)	0	0	1	0	0	2	1	0	X	X	4
New Brunswick (Smeltzer)	1	2	0	2	3	0	0	2	X	X	10

Sheet G	1	2	3	4	5	6	7	8	9	10	Final
Nunavut (Komaksiutiksak)	1	0	1	0	1	0	0	1	1	0	5
Northwest Territories (Kaeser)	0	3	0	1	0	0	1	0	0	3	8

==== Draw 16 ====
Thursday, January 24, 09:00

Sheet F	1	2	3	4	5	6	7	8	9	10	Final
New Brunswick (Smeltzer)	1	0	6	0	0	3	0	0	X	X	10
Ontario (Steep)	0	1	0	2	0	0	3	0	X	X	6

Sheet H	1	2	3	4	5	6	7	8	9	10	Final
Northwest Territories (Kaeser)	0	0	0	0	1	0	1	0	1	X	3
Yukon (Jensen)	0	0	0	1	0	3	0	2	0	X	6

==== Draw 17 ====
Thursday, January 24, 14:00

Sheet D	1	2	3	4	5	6	7	8	9	10	Final
Prince Edward Island (Smith)	3	3	0	5	3	2	0	0	X	X	16
Nunavut (Komaksiutiksak)	0	0	1	0	0	0	0	1	X	X	2

==== Draw 18 ====
Thursday, January 24, 19:00

Sheet F	1	2	3	4	5	6	7	8	9	10	Final
Yukon (Jensen)	0	0	0	0	1	1	2	1	0	X	5
Prince Edward Island (Smith)	2	3	2	1	0	0	0	0	1	X	9

Sheet I	1	2	3	4	5	6	7	8	9	10	Final
Nunavut (Komaksiutiksak)	0	0	1	2	0	0	1	0	X	X	4
New Brunswick (Smeltzer)	2	2	0	0	3	5	0	3	X	X	15

==== Draw 19 ====
Friday, January 25, 09:00

Sheet D	1	2	3	4	5	6	7	8	9	10	Final
Ontario (Steep)	1	2	0	1	0	2	3	0	X	X	9
Northwest Territories (Kaeser)	0	0	1	0	1	0	0	1	X	X	3

=== Championship pool ===
==== Championship pool standings ====
Key
Teams to playoffs

Province	Skip	W	L
British Columbia	Tyler Tardi	9	1
Saskatchewan	Rylan Kleiter	8	2
Manitoba	J.T. Ryan	7	3
Northern Ontario	Tanner Horgan	6	4
Alberta	Desmond Young	5	5
Quebec	Vincent Roberge	5	5
Newfoundland and Labrador	Greg Blyde	5	5
Nova Scotia	Graeme Weagle	4	6

==== Draw 14 ====
Wednesday, January 23, 14:00

Sheet A	1	2	3	4	5	6	7	8	9	10	Final
Quebec (Roberge)	0	1	0	1	1	0	0	1	0	X	4
Saskatchewan (Kleiter)	1	0	3	0	0	2	2	0	2	X	10

Sheet C	1	2	3	4	5	6	7	8	9	10	Final
Northern Ontario (Horgan)	0	0	0	1	0	0	0	1	0	X	2
British Columbia (Tardi)	1	0	1	0	1	1	1	0	1	X	6

==== Draw 15 ====
Wednesday, January 23, 19:00

Sheet B	1	2	3	4	5	6	7	8	9	10	Final
Newfoundland and Labrador (Blyde)	0	2	0	2	1	0	2	2	1	X	10
Nova Scotia (Weagle)	2	0	1	0	0	3	0	0	0	X	6

Sheet E	1	2	3	4	5	6	7	8	9	10	Final
Alberta (Young)	0	0	0	0	2	0	1	0	X	X	3
Manitoba (Ryan)	0	0	2	2	0	3	0	3	X	X	10

==== Draw 16 ====
Thursday, January 24, 09:00

Sheet B	1	2	3	4	5	6	7	8	9	10	Final
Saskatchewan (Kleiter)	1	0	0	2	0	1	0	2	0	1	7
Northern Ontario (Horgan)	0	1	1	0	1	0	2	0	1	0	6

Sheet C	1	2	3	4	5	6	7	8	9	10	11	Final
Nova Scotia (Weagle)	0	0	2	0	2	0	0	3	0	2	0	9
Alberta (Young)	2	0	0	2	0	1	3	0	1	0	1	10

Sheet I	1	2	3	4	5	6	7	8	9	10	Final
Manitoba (Ryan)	0	3	2	0	1	1	0	0	X	X	7
British Columbia (Tardi)	0	0	0	2	0	0	1	1	X	X	4

==== Draw 17 ====
Thursday, January 24, 14:00

Sheet A	1	2	3	4	5	6	7	8	9	10	Final
Manitoba (Ryan)	0	0	0	0	0	2	0	2	1	X	5
Newfoundland and Labrador (Blyde)	1	2	1	1	2	0	2	0	0	X	9

Sheet E	1	2	3	4	5	6	7	8	9	10	Final
British Columbia (Tardi)	2	1	0	0	1	0	2	0	0	X	6
Quebec (Roberge)	0	0	2	0	0	1	0	0	1	X	4

Sheet F	1	2	3	4	5	6	7	8	9	10	Final
Nova Scotia (Weagle)	0	0	0	1	0	1	0	0	X	X	2
Saskatchewan (Kleiter)	4	1	1	0	4	0	2	0	X	X	12

==== Draw 18 ====
Thursday, January 24, 19:00

Sheet A	1	2	3	4	5	6	7	8	9	10	Final
Alberta (Young)	0	0	1	0	2	0	2	0	1	X	6
Northern Ontario (Horgan)	0	3	0	1	0	3	0	2	0	X	9

Sheet C	1	2	3	4	5	6	7	8	9	10	Final
Newfoundland and Labrador (Blyde)	0	0	0	0	1	0	1	1	X	X	3
Quebec (Roberge)	0	2	1	4	0	1	0	0	X	X	8

==== Draw 19 ====
Friday, January 25, 09:00

Sheet A	1	2	3	4	5	6	7	8	9	10	Final
British Columbia (Tardi)	2	1	0	0	1	0	0	2	1	X	7
Nova Scotia (Weagle)	0	0	0	1	0	2	0	0	0	X	3

Sheet C	1	2	3	4	5	6	7	8	9	10	Final
Saskatchewan (Kleiter)	1	0	1	2	0	0	0	0	0	0	4
Manitoba (Ryan)	0	1	0	0	2	1	1	0	1	4	10

Sheet G	1	2	3	4	5	6	7	8	9	10	Final
Northern Ontario (Horgan)	1	0	2	1	0	2	1	0	2	X	9
Newfoundland and Labrador (Blyde)	0	3	0	0	1	0	0	1	0	X	5

Sheet H	1	2	3	4	5	6	7	8	9	10	Final
Quebec (Roberge)	0	1	0	1	0	1	0	2	0	X	5
Alberta (Young)	1	0	2	0	1	0	1	0	4	X	9

== Playoffs ==
Semifinal			Final
			1	British Columbia	7
2	Saskatchewan	3	3	Manitoba	5
3	Manitoba	9

=== Semifinal ===
Saturday, January 26, 19:00

Sheet D	1	2	3	4	5	6	7	8	9	10	Final
Saskatchewan (Kleiter)	0	0	0	0	0	1	0	2	0	X	3
Manitoba (Ryan)	0	1	0	0	1	0	3	0	4	X	9

Player percentages
Saskatchewan		Manitoba	
Matthieu Taillon	86%	Cole Chandler	89%
Joshua Mattern	81%	Jordan Peters	82%
Trevor Johnson	72%	Jacques Gauthier	78%
Rylan Kleiter	70%	J.T. Ryan	85%
Total	78%	Total	83%

=== Final ===
Sunday, January 27, 15:00

Sheet D	1	2	3	4	5	6	7	8	9	10	Final
British Columbia (Tardi)	0	3	0	0	0	0	0	2	1	1	7
Manitoba (Ryan)	0	0	0	2	2	0	1	0	0	0	5

Player percentages
British Columbia		Manitoba	
Alex Horvath	94%	Cole Chandler	88%
Matthew Hall	84%	Jordan Peters	83%
Sterling Middleton	88%	Jacques Gauthier	78%
Tyler Tardi	83%	J.T. Ryan	82%
Total	87%	Total	82%
