= 2025 GSOC Tahoe =

Grand Slam of Curling event

- Host city: Stateline, Nevada
- Arena: Tahoe Blue Event Center
- Dates: November 4–9
- Men's winner: (Scotland) Team Mouat
- Curling club: Gogar Park CC, Edinburgh
- Skip: Bruce Mouat
- Third: Grant Hardie
- Second: Bobby Lammie
- Lead: Hammy McMillan Jr.
- Coach: Michael Goodfellow
- Finalist: (Manitoba) Matt Dunstone
- Women's winner: (Ontario) Team Homan
- Curling club: Ottawa CC, Ottawa
- Skip: Rachel Homan
- Third: Tracy Fleury
- Second: Emma Miskew
- Lead: Sarah Wilkes
- Finalist: (Switzerland) Silvana Tirinzoni

The 2025 KIOTI GSOC Tahoe was held from November 4 to 9 at the Tahoe Blue Event Center in Stateline, Nevada. It was the third Grand Slam event of the 2025–26 curling season, and was that season's edition of The National, which was rebranded for the event. The event was also the first Grand Slam of Curling event to take place outside of Canada.

== Qualification ==
The top 16 ranked men's and women's teams on the World Curling Federation's world team rankings as of October 22, 2025, qualified for the event. However, the Grand Slam of Curling may fill one spot in each division as a sponsor's exemption. In the event that a team declines their invitation, the next-ranked team on the world team ranking is invited until the field is complete. In a first, an "All-Star Team" that is led by Pro Football Hall of Famer Jared Allen was also invited by the Grand Slam of Curling to compete in the men's field.

=== Men ===
Top world team ranking men's teams:

1. (Scotland) Bruce Mouat
2. (Manitoba) Matt Dunstone
3. (Switzerland) Yannick Schwaller
4. (Alberta) Brad Jacobs
5. (Scotland) Ross Whyte
6. (Ontario) John Epping
7. (Italy) Joël Retornaz
8. (Sweden) Niklas Edin
9. (Saskatchewan) Mike McEwen
10. (Switzerland) Marco Hösli
11. (Scotland) Kyle Waddell
12. (Germany) Marc Muskatewitz
13. (United States) ~~Daniel Casper~~
14. (United States) ~~John Shuster~~
15. (Newfoundland and Labrador) ~~Brad Gushue~~
16. (China) Xu Xiaoming
17. (Norway) ~~Magnus Ramsfjell~~
18. (United States) ~~Korey Dropkin~~
19. (Czech Republic) ~~Lukáš Klíma~~
20. (Japan) ~~Tsuyoshi Yamaguchi~~
21. (Saskatchewan) Rylan Kleiter

Sponsor's Exemption:

- (Manitoba) Jordon McDonald

"All-Star Team":

- (United States) Jared Allen

=== Women ===
Top world team ranking women's teams:

1. (Ontario) Rachel Homan
2. (Switzerland) Silvana Tirinzoni
3. (South Korea) Gim Eun-ji
4. (South Korea) Ha Seung-youn
5. (Switzerland) Xenia Schwaller
6. (South Korea) ~~Kim Eun-jung~~
7. (Sweden) Anna Hasselborg
8. (Manitoba) Kerri Einarson
9. (Japan) Momoha Tabata
10. (Japan) Sayaka Yoshimura
11. (Japan) Satsuki Fujisawa
12. (Sweden) Isabella Wranå
13. (Japan) Ikue Kitazawa
14. (Scotland) Rebecca Morrison
15. (South Korea) Kang Bo-bae
16. (China) Wang Rui
17. (Manitoba) Kaitlyn Lawes

== Men ==
=== Teams ===
The teams are listed as follows:

Skip	Third	Second	Lead	Alternate	Locale
Wayne Middaugh (Note: Wayne Middaugh skipped Team Allen.)	John Morris	Jason Smith	Jared Allen		(United States) Minneapolis, Minnesota
Matt Dunstone	Colton Lott	E. J. Harnden	Ryan Harnden		Winnipeg, Manitoba
Niklas Edin	Oskar Eriksson	Rasmus Wranå	Christoffer Sundgren		Karlstad, Sweden
John Epping	Jacob Horgan	Tanner Horgan	Ian McMillan		Sudbury, Ontario
Philipp Hösli (Fourth)	Marco Hösli (Skip)	Simon Gloor	Justin Hausherr		Glarus, Switzerland
Brad Jacobs	Marc Kennedy	Brett Gallant	Ben Hebert		Calgary, Alberta
Rylan Kleiter	Matthew Hall	Joshua Mattern	Trevor Johnson		Saskatoon, Saskatchewan
Jordon McDonald	Jacques Gauthier	Elias Huminicki	Cameron Olafson		Winnipeg, Manitoba
Mike McEwen	Colton Flasch	Kevin Marsh	Dan Marsh		Saskatoon, Saskatchewan
Bruce Mouat	Grant Hardie	Bobby Lammie	Hammy McMillan Jr.		Edinburgh, Scotland
Marc Muskatewitz	Benny Kapp	Felix Messenzehl	Johannes Scheuerl	Mario Trevisiol	Füssen, Germany
Joël Retornaz	Amos Mosaner	Sebastiano Arman	Mattia Giovanella		Trentino, Italy
Benoît Schwarz-van Berkel (Fourth)	Yannick Schwaller (Skip)	Sven Michel	Pablo Lachat		Geneva, Switzerland
Kyle Waddell	Mark Watt	Angus Bryce	Blair Haswell		Hamilton, Scotland
Ross Whyte	Robin Brydone	Craig Waddell (Note: Alternate Craig Waddell spared for Duncan McFadzean.)	Euan Kyle		Stirling, Scotland
Xu Xiaoming	Fei Xueqing	Li Zhichao	Xu Jingtao	Yang Bohao	Beijing, China

=== Round robin standings ===
Final Round Robin Standings

Key
Teams to Playoffs
Teams to Tiebreaker

Pool A	W	SOW	SOL	L	PF	PA	Pts	LSD
(Scotland) Bruce Mouat	4	0	0	0	28	13	12	48.3
(Saskatchewan) Mike McEwen	2	0	0	2	26	18	6	18.3
(Sweden) Niklas Edin	2	0	0	2	26	24	6	124.1
(United States) Team Allen	0	0	1	3	12	37	1	84.8

Pool B	W	SOW	SOL	L	PF	PA	Pts	LSD
(Manitoba) Matt Dunstone	4	0	0	0	27	15	12	89.4
(Italy) Joël Retornaz	2	0	0	2	24	20	6	10.9
(Manitoba) Jordon McDonald	1	0	0	3	23	26	3	261.3
(Switzerland) Marco Hösli	1	0	0	3	19	30	3	41

Pool C	W	SOW	SOL	L	PF	PA	Pts	LSD
(Switzerland) Yannick Schwaller	3	0	1	0	30	20	10	189.6
(Scotland) Kyle Waddell	1	2	0	1	25	21	7	75.8
(Ontario) John Epping	2	0	1	1	24	24	7	165.4
(Saskatchewan) Rylan Kleiter	0	0	0	4	15	31	0	93.1

Pool D	W	SOW	SOL	L	PF	PA	Pts	LSD
(Alberta) Brad Jacobs	4	0	0	0	24	17	12	90.4
(Scotland) Ross Whyte	1	2	0	1	27	24	7	126.3
(Germany) Marc Muskatewitz	0	1	1	2	23	25	3	128.7
(China) Xu Xiaoming	0	0	1	3	18	26	1	136.2

=== Round robin results ===
All draw times are listed in Pacific Time (UTC−08:00).

==== Draw 1 ====
Tuesday, November 4, 8:00 am

Sheet C	1	2	3	4	5	6	7	8	Final
(Sweden) Niklas Edin	0	1	0	1	0	2	0	2	6
(China) Xu Xiaoming 🔨	2	0	0	0	1	0	2	0	5

Sheet D	1	2	3	4	5	6	7	8	Final
(Ontario) John Epping	1	0	3	0	0	1	0	1	6
(Manitoba) Jordon McDonald 🔨	0	1	0	1	0	0	2	0	4

==== Draw 2 ====
Tuesday, November 4, 11:30 am

Sheet C	1	2	3	4	5	6	7	8	Final
(Italy) Joël Retornaz 🔨	2	0	1	0	0	4	3	X	10
(Saskatchewan) Rylan Kleiter	0	1	0	1	1	0	0	X	3

Sheet D	1	2	3	4	5	6	7	8	Final
(Scotland) Bruce Mouat 🔨	0	2	0	3	0	2	0	0	7
(Germany) Marc Muskatewitz	1	0	2	0	2	0	1	0	6

==== Draw 3 ====
Tuesday, November 4, 3:00 pm

Sheet C	1	2	3	4	5	6	7	8	Final
(Manitoba) Matt Dunstone	0	2	1	0	0	2	1	0	6
(Scotland) Kyle Waddell 🔨	2	0	0	0	2	0	0	1	5

Sheet D	1	2	3	4	5	6	7	8	9	Final
(Scotland) Ross Whyte	0	2	0	3	0	4	0	0	1	10
(United States) Team Allen 🔨	3	0	2	0	1	0	0	3	0	9

==== Draw 4 ====
Tuesday, November 4, 6:30 pm

Sheet C	1	2	3	4	5	6	7	8	Final
(Switzerland) Yannick Schwaller	0	2	1	0	3	0	2	X	8
(Switzerland) Marco Hösli 🔨	0	0	0	2	0	2	0	X	4

Sheet D	1	2	3	4	5	6	7	8	Final
(Alberta) Brad Jacobs 🔨	0	2	0	1	2	0	0	2	7
(Saskatchewan) Mike McEwen	2	0	2	0	0	1	1	0	6

==== Draw 5 ====
Wednesday, November 5, 8:00 am

Sheet A	1	2	3	4	5	6	7	8	9	Final
(Scotland) Ross Whyte 🔨	1	0	0	1	1	0	0	1	1	5
(Germany) Marc Muskatewitz	0	1	0	0	0	2	1	0	0	4

Sheet B	1	2	3	4	5	6	7	8	Final
(Scotland) Kyle Waddell 🔨	2	0	2	0	2	0	0	X	6
(Saskatchewan) Rylan Kleiter	0	1	0	1	0	1	0	X	3

==== Draw 6 ====
Wednesday, November 5, 11:30 am

Sheet A	1	2	3	4	5	6	7	8	Final
(Sweden) Niklas Edin 🔨	2	2	4	0	3	X	X	X	11
(United States) Team Allen	0	0	0	1	0	X	X	X	1

Sheet B	1	2	3	4	5	6	7	8	Final
(Switzerland) Marco Hösli 🔨	0	2	0	1	0	2	0	0	5
(Manitoba) Jordon McDonald	2	0	2	0	1	0	2	4	11

==== Draw 7 ====
Wednesday, November 5, 3:30 pm

Sheet A	1	2	3	4	5	6	7	8	Final
(Alberta) Brad Jacobs 🔨	1	0	0	2	0	1	0	X	4
(China) Xu Xiaoming	0	1	0	0	0	0	1	X	2

Sheet B	1	2	3	4	5	6	7	8	Final
(Switzerland) Yannick Schwaller 🔨	2	0	0	1	0	2	1	3	9
(Ontario) John Epping	0	2	1	0	1	0	0	0	4

==== Draw 8 ====
Wednesday, November 5, 7:30 pm

Sheet A	1	2	3	4	5	6	7	8	Final
(Scotland) Bruce Mouat	1	1	3	1	0	X	X	X	6
(Saskatchewan) Mike McEwen 🔨	0	0	0	0	1	X	X	X	1

Sheet B	1	2	3	4	5	6	7	8	Final
(Manitoba) Matt Dunstone 🔨	2	0	2	2	0	1	X	X	7
(Italy) Joël Retornaz	0	1	0	0	1	0	X	X	2

==== Draw 9 ====
Thursday, November 6, 8:00 am

Sheet A	1	2	3	4	5	6	7	8	Final
(Switzerland) Yannick Schwaller	0	1	0	3	0	2	0	X	6
(Saskatchewan) Rylan Kleiter 🔨	1	0	1	0	1	0	1	X	4

Sheet B	1	2	3	4	5	6	7	8	9	Final
(Germany) Marc Muskatewitz	0	1	1	0	0	2	0	2	1	7
(China) Xu Xiaoming 🔨	1	0	0	1	3	0	1	0	0	6

==== Draw 10 ====
Thursday, November 6, 11:30 am

Sheet A	1	2	3	4	5	6	7	8	9	Final
(Ontario) John Epping	0	2	1	0	0	0	2	0	0	5
(Scotland) Kyle Waddell 🔨	1	0	0	1	1	0	0	2	1	6

==== Draw 11 ====
Thursday, November 6, 3:30 pm

Sheet B	1	2	3	4	5	6	7	8	Final
(Saskatchewan) Mike McEwen 🔨	2	2	1	1	0	2	X	X	8
(United States) Team Allen	0	0	0	0	0	0	X	X	0

Sheet C	1	2	3	4	5	6	7	8	Final
(Italy) Joël Retornaz 🔨	0	2	0	2	1	0	2	1	8
(Manitoba) Jordon McDonald	0	0	2	0	0	2	0	0	4

Sheet D	1	2	3	4	5	6	7	8	Final
(Manitoba) Matt Dunstone 🔨	2	0	3	0	2	0	0	X	7
(Switzerland) Marco Hösli	0	1	0	2	0	0	1	X	4

==== Draw 12 ====
Thursday, November 6, 7:30 pm

Sheet B	1	2	3	4	5	6	7	8	Final
(Alberta) Brad Jacobs 🔨	1	0	1	2	0	0	2	X	6
(Scotland) Ross Whyte	0	1	0	0	0	2	0	X	3

Sheet C	1	2	3	4	5	6	7	8	Final
(Scotland) Bruce Mouat 🔨	1	1	0	2	0	1	0	2	7
(Sweden) Niklas Edin	0	0	2	0	1	0	1	0	4

==== Draw 13 ====
Friday, November 7, 8:00 am

Sheet A	1	2	3	4	5	6	7	8	Final
(Italy) Joël Retornaz	0	1	0	1	0	0	2	X	4
(Switzerland) Marco Hösli 🔨	2	0	1	0	1	2	0	X	6

Sheet D	1	2	3	4	5	6	7	8	Final
(Sweden) Niklas Edin	0	1	0	3	0	1	0	X	5
(Saskatchewan) Mike McEwen 🔨	2	0	2	0	2	0	5	X	11

==== Draw 14 ====
Friday, November 7, 11:30 am

Sheet C	1	2	3	4	5	6	7	8	Final
(Alberta) Brad Jacobs 🔨	2	0	2	0	1	0	1	1	7
(Germany) Marc Muskatewitz	0	2	0	2	0	2	0	0	6

Sheet D	1	2	3	4	5	6	7	8	9	Final
(Switzerland) Yannick Schwaller	2	0	2	0	2	0	1	0	0	7
(Scotland) Kyle Waddell 🔨	0	1	0	2	0	3	0	1	1	8

==== Draw 15 ====
Friday, November 7, 3:30 pm

Sheet B	1	2	3	4	5	6	7	8	Final
(Ontario) John Epping	0	0	2	0	4	1	0	2	9
(Saskatchewan) Rylan Kleiter 🔨	1	2	0	2	0	0	0	0	5

Sheet D	1	2	3	4	5	6	7	8	Final
(Scotland) Ross Whyte	0	3	0	0	1	0	5	X	9
(China) Xu Xiaoming 🔨	1	0	1	1	0	2	0	X	5

==== Draw 16 ====
Friday, November 7, 7:30 pm

Sheet B	1	2	3	4	5	6	7	8	Final
(Manitoba) Matt Dunstone 🔨	1	0	3	0	2	0	1	X	7
(Manitoba) Jordon McDonald	0	2	0	1	0	1	0	X	4

Sheet D	1	2	3	4	5	6	7	8	Final
(Scotland) Bruce Mouat 🔨	2	1	0	2	1	0	2	X	8
(United States) Team Allen	0	0	1	0	0	1	0	X	2

=== Tiebreaker ===
Saturday, November 8, 8:00 am

Sheet B	1	2	3	4	5	6	7	8	Final
(Italy) Joël Retornaz 🔨	0	1	0	2	0	0	X	X	3
(Saskatchewan) Mike McEwen	0	0	2	0	3	2	X	X	7

=== Playoffs ===
Quarterfinals
1	(Scotland) Bruce Mouat	8
8	(Saskatchewan) Mike McEwen	4
4	(Switzerland) Yannick Schwaller	7
5	(Scotland) Kyle Waddell	4
2	(Manitoba) Matt Dunstone	7
7	(Ontario) John Epping	3
3	(Alberta) Brad Jacobs	7
6	(Scotland) Ross Whyte	5

Semifinals
1	(Scotland) Bruce Mouat	6
4	(Switzerland) Yannick Schwaller	5
2	(Manitoba) Matt Dunstone	5
3	(Alberta) Brad Jacobs	4

Final
1	(Scotland) Bruce Mouat	7
2	(Manitoba) Matt Dunstone	6

==== Quarterfinals ====
Saturday, November 8, 3:30 pm

Sheet A	1	2	3	4	5	6	7	8	Final
(Alberta) Brad Jacobs 🔨	1	1	0	2	0	0	2	1	7
(Scotland) Ross Whyte	0	0	2	0	2	1	0	0	5

Sheet B	1	2	3	4	5	6	7	8	Final
(Switzerland) Yannick Schwaller 🔨	2	0	1	0	2	0	2	X	7
(Scotland) Kyle Waddell	0	1	0	2	0	1	0	X	4

Sheet C	1	2	3	4	5	6	7	8	Final
(Scotland) Bruce Mouat 🔨	0	3	0	1	0	1	0	3	8
(Saskatchewan) Mike McEwen	1	0	1	0	1	0	1	0	4

Sheet D	1	2	3	4	5	6	7	8	Final
(Manitoba) Matt Dunstone 🔨	4	0	1	1	1	0	X	X	7
(Ontario) John Epping	0	2	0	0	0	1	X	X	3

==== Semifinals ====
Saturday, November 8, 7:30 pm

Sheet D	1	2	3	4	5	6	7	8	Final
(Scotland) Bruce Mouat 🔨	1	0	2	0	0	0	2	1	6
(Switzerland) Yannick Schwaller	0	1	0	2	1	1	0	0	5

Sheet C	1	2	3	4	5	6	7	8	Final
(Manitoba) Matt Dunstone	0	2	0	1	1	1	0	0	5
(Alberta) Brad Jacobs 🔨	2	0	1	0	0	0	0	1	4

==== Final ====
Sunday, November 9, 11:30 am

Sheet C	1	2	3	4	5	6	7	8	9	Final
(Scotland) Bruce Mouat 🔨	2	0	1	0	0	1	0	2	1	7
(Manitoba) Matt Dunstone	0	2	0	1	1	0	2	0	0	6

=== Player percentages ===
Final Round Robin Percentages

Leads	%
(Sweden) Christoffer Sundgren	91.10
(Switzerland) Justin Hausherr	88.00
(Manitoba) Ryan Harnden	87.80
(Alberta) Ben Hebert	86.90
(Ontario) Ian McMillan	86.30
(Scotland) Euan Kyle	86.10
(Scotland) Hammy McMillan Jr.	83.70
(Scotland) Blair Haswell	83.10
(China) Xu Jingtao	82.90
(Saskatchewan) Dan Marsh	82.10
(Manitoba) Cameron Olafson	81.90
(Italy) Mattia Giovanella	81.70
(Saskatchewan) Trevor Johnson	79.00
(Germany) Johannes Scheuerl	77.20
(United States) Jared Allen	75.40
(Switzerland) Pablo Lachat-Couchepin	75.20

Seconds	%
(Scotland) Angus Bryce	81.60
(Scotland) Craig Waddell	81.60
(Sweden) Rasmus Wranå	81.40
(Italy) Sebastiano Arman	80.00
(Alberta) Brett Gallant	79.30
(Manitoba) Elias Huminicki	78.40
(Switzerland) Sven Michel	77.70
(Manitoba) E. J. Harnden	77.70
(Ontario) Tanner Horgan	76.60
(Germany) Felix Messenzehl	76.30
(Switzerland) Simon Gloor	76.00
(Saskatchewan) Kevin Marsh	75.90
(Scotland) Bobby Lammie	75.10
(China) Li Zhichao	73.90
(United States) Jason Smith	63.80
(Saskatchewan) Joshua Mattern	59.30

Thirds	%
(Scotland) Grant Hardie	84.90
(Alberta) Marc Kennedy	83.00
(Germany) Benjamin Kapp	81.90
(Manitoba) Colton Lott	81.50
(Scotland) Robin Brydone	80.80
(Switzerland) Yannick Schwaller (Skip)	79.10
(Scotland) Mark Watt	77.90
(Italy) Amos Mosaner	77.60
(China) Fei Xueqing	76.80
(Ontario) Jacob Horgan	76.60
(Switzerland) Marco Hösli (Skip)	72.00
(United States) John Morris	71.20
(Sweden) Oskar Eriksson	70.70
(Saskatchewan) Matthew Hall	70.70
(Manitoba) Jacques Gauthier	67.20
(Saskatchewan) Colton Flasch	66.80

Skips	%
(Scotland) Bruce Mouat	87.40
(Switzerland) Benoît Schwarz-van Berkel (Fourth)	86.00
(Manitoba) Matt Dunstone	84.60
(Alberta) Brad Jacobs	83.50
(Scotland) Kyle Waddell	79.50
(Scotland) Ross Whyte	79.20
(Ontario) John Epping	78.90
(Switzerland) Philipp Hösli (Fourth)	78.30
(Sweden) Niklas Edin	77.80
(Germany) Marc Muskatewitz	77.50
(China) Xu Xiaoming	76.70
(Manitoba) Jordon McDonald	76.00
(Italy) Joël Retornaz	70.50
(Saskatchewan) Mike McEwen	68.80
(Saskatchewan) Rylan Kleiter	65.80
(United States) Wayne Middaugh	59.60

== Women ==
=== Teams ===
The teams are listed as follows:

Skip	Third	Second	Lead	Alternate	Locale
Kerri Einarson	Val Sweeting	Shannon Birchard	Karlee Burgess	Krysten Karwacki	Gimli, Manitoba
Satsuki Fujisawa	Chinami Yoshida	Yumi Suzuki	Yurika Yoshida		Kitami, Japan
Gim Eun-ji	Kim Min-ji	Kim Su-ji	Seol Ye-eun	Seol Ye-ji	Uijeongbu, South Korea
Ha Seung-youn	Kim Hye-rin	Yang Tae-i	Kim Su-jin	Park Seo-jin	Chuncheon, South Korea
Anna Hasselborg	Sara McManus	Agnes Knochenhauer	Sofia Scharback	Johanna Heldin	Sundbyberg, Sweden
Rachel Homan	Tracy Fleury	Emma Miskew	Sarah Wilkes		Ottawa, Ontario
Kang Bo-bae	Shim Yu-jeong	Kim Min-seo	Kim Ji-soo	Lee Bo-young	Jeonbuk, South Korea
Ikue Kitazawa	Seina Nakajima	Minori Suzuki	Hasumi Ishigooka		Nagano, Japan
Kaitlyn Lawes (Fourth)	Selena Njegovan (Skip) (Note: Selena Njegovan skipped Team Lawes.)	Jocelyn Peterman	Kristin Gordon	Laura Walker	Winnipeg, Manitoba
Rebecca Morrison (Fourth)	Jennifer Dodds	Sophie Sinclair	Sophie Jackson (Skip) (Note: Sophie Jackson skipped Team Morrison.)		Stirling, Scotland
Xenia Schwaller	Selina Gafner	Fabienne Rieder	Selina Rychiger		Zurich, Switzerland
Miku Nihira (Note: Miku Nihira skipped Team Tabata.)	Momoha Tabata	Sae Yamamoto	Mikoto Nakajima		Sapporo, Japan
Alina Pätz (Fourth)	Silvana Tirinzoni (Skip)	Carole Howald	Selina Witschonke		Aarau, Switzerland
Wang Rui	Han Yu	Dong Ziqi	Jiang Jiayi	Su Tingyu	Beijing, China
Isabella Wranå	Almida de Val	Maria Larsson	Linda Stenlund		Sundbyberg, Sweden
Sayaka Yoshimura	Kaho Onodera	Yuna Kotani	Anna Ohmiya	Mina Kobayashi	Sapporo, Japan

=== Round robin standings ===
Final Round Robin Standings

Key
Teams to Playoffs
Teams to Tiebreakers

Pool A	W	SOW	SOL	L	PF	PA	Pts	LSD
(Ontario) Rachel Homan	4	0	0	0	34	15	12	103.4
(Japan) Sayaka Yoshimura	2	0	1	1	21	26	7	59
(Manitoba) Team Lawes	1	0	0	3	17	27	3	79.5
(Japan) Team Tabata	1	0	0	3	20	22	3	69.9

Pool B	W	SOW	SOL	L	PF	PA	Pts	LSD
(Switzerland) Silvana Tirinzoni	4	0	0	0	30	15	12	141
(Japan) Satsuki Fujisawa	2	0	0	2	22	27	6	64.2
(Manitoba) Kerri Einarson	2	0	0	2	24	20	6	111.4
(China) Wang Rui	1	0	0	3	17	27	3	214.3

Pool C	W	SOW	SOL	L	PF	PA	Pts	LSD
(Sweden) Anna Hasselborg	2	0	1	1	20	19	7	42.3
(South Korea) Gim Eun-ji	2	0	0	2	24	22	6	177
(South Korea) Kang Bo-bae	2	0	0	2	19	19	6	203.5
(Sweden) Isabella Wranå	0	1	0	3	18	25	2	141.7

Pool D	W	SOW	SOL	L	PF	PA	Pts	LSD
(Switzerland) Xenia Schwaller	3	0	0	1	29	19	9	40.5
(Japan) Ikue Kitazawa	2	0	0	2	24	29	6	165.9
(South Korea) Ha Seung-youn	1	1	0	2	23	24	5	141.9
(Scotland) Team Morrison	1	0	0	3	18	24	3	213.23

=== Round robin results ===
All draw times are listed in Pacific Time (UTC−08:00).

==== Draw 1 ====
Tuesday, November 4, 8:00 am

Sheet A	1	2	3	4	5	6	7	8	9	Final
(South Korea) Ha Seung-youn	0	2	2	0	0	2	0	0	1	7
(Japan) Sayaka Yoshimura 🔨	1	0	0	1	2	0	1	1	0	6

Sheet B	1	2	3	4	5	6	7	8	Final
(South Korea) Gim Eun-ji 🔨	1	0	1	0	0	0	2	X	4
(Japan) Satsuki Fujisawa	0	1	0	1	2	3	0	X	7

==== Draw 2 ====
Tuesday, November 4, 11:30 am

Sheet A	1	2	3	4	5	6	7	8	Final
(Switzerland) Silvana Tirinzoni 🔨	0	0	2	2	0	1	0	2	7
(Sweden) Isabella Wranå	3	0	0	0	1	0	2	0	6

Sheet B	1	2	3	4	5	6	7	8	Final
(Switzerland) Xenia Schwaller	0	2	0	1	0	3	2	X	8
(Manitoba) Team Lawes 🔨	1	0	2	0	1	0	0	X	4

==== Draw 3 ====
Tuesday, November 4, 3:00 pm

Sheet A	1	2	3	4	5	6	7	8	Final
(Manitoba) Kerri Einarson 🔨	2	0	0	1	1	0	3	X	7
(South Korea) Kang Bo-bae	0	1	1	0	0	1	0	X	3

Sheet B	1	2	3	4	5	6	7	8	Final
(Ontario) Rachel Homan 🔨	4	0	0	2	0	0	3	X	9
(Japan) Ikue Kitazawa	0	2	0	0	0	2	0	X	4

==== Draw 4 ====
Tuesday, November 4, 6:30 pm

Sheet A	1	2	3	4	5	6	7	8	Final
(Sweden) Anna Hasselborg 🔨	3	0	1	0	3	0	1	X	8
(China) Wang Rui	0	1	0	1	0	2	0	X	4

Sheet B	1	2	3	4	5	6	7	8	Final
(Japan) Team Tabata 🔨	1	0	0	1	0	1	1	1	5
(Scotland) Team Morrison	0	1	1	0	1	0	0	0	3

==== Draw 5 ====
Wednesday, November 5, 8:00 am

Sheet C	1	2	3	4	5	6	7	8	Final
(South Korea) Gim Eun-ji 🔨	2	2	0	0	2	0	0	1	7
(Sweden) Isabella Wranå	0	0	3	1	0	1	0	0	5

Sheet D	1	2	3	4	5	6	7	8	Final
(Japan) Sayaka Yoshimura 🔨	1	0	1	0	2	0	1	1	6
(Manitoba) Team Lawes	0	1	0	1	0	2	0	0	4

==== Draw 6 ====
Wednesday, November 5, 11:30 am

Sheet C	1	2	3	4	5	6	7	8	Final
(South Korea) Ha Seung-youn	1	1	0	1	0	1	1	0	5
(Switzerland) Xenia Schwaller 🔨	0	0	3	0	2	0	0	1	6

Sheet D	1	2	3	4	5	6	7	8	Final
(Manitoba) Kerri Einarson 🔨	1	0	0	2	0	1	2	X	6
(China) Wang Rui	0	2	0	0	1	0	0	X	3

==== Draw 7 ====
Wednesday, November 5, 3:30 pm

Sheet C	1	2	3	4	5	6	7	8	Final
(Japan) Ikue Kitazawa 🔨	1	0	3	1	0	1	0	1	7
(Scotland) Team Morrison	0	1	0	0	2	0	3	0	6

Sheet D	1	2	3	4	5	6	7	8	Final
(Switzerland) Silvana Tirinzoni	0	1	0	5	1	2	X	X	9
(Japan) Satsuki Fujisawa 🔨	1	0	1	0	0	0	X	X	2

==== Draw 8 ====
Wednesday, November 5, 7:30 pm

Sheet C	1	2	3	4	5	6	7	8	Final
(Ontario) Rachel Homan 🔨	0	1	0	2	1	2	0	1	7
(Japan) Team Tabata	1	0	3	0	0	0	1	0	5

Sheet D	1	2	3	4	5	6	7	8	Final
(Sweden) Anna Hasselborg	0	0	1	0	0	0	X	X	1
(South Korea) Kang Bo-bae 🔨	2	0	0	1	1	2	X	X	6

==== Draw 9 ====
Thursday, November 6, 8:00 am

Sheet C	1	2	3	4	5	6	7	8	Final
(Japan) Satsuki Fujisawa 🔨	0	1	0	2	0	1	0	1	5
(China) Wang Rui	1	0	1	0	3	0	2	0	7

Sheet D	1	2	3	4	5	6	7	8	Final
(South Korea) Ha Seung-youn 🔨	0	1	0	1	0	1	0	0	3
(Scotland) Team Morrison	2	0	1	0	1	0	1	1	6

==== Draw 10 ====
Thursday, November 6, 11:30 am

Sheet B	1	2	3	4	5	6	7	8	Final
(South Korea) Gim Eun-ji	0	0	1	0	2	0	1	X	4
(Sweden) Anna Hasselborg 🔨	3	1	0	1	0	2	0	X	7

Sheet C	1	2	3	4	5	6	7	8	Final
(Switzerland) Silvana Tirinzoni 🔨	1	1	0	1	0	2	0	1	6
(Manitoba) Kerri Einarson	0	0	2	0	1	0	1	0	4

Sheet D	1	2	3	4	5	6	7	8	Final
(Sweden) Isabella Wranå	0	0	0	1	1	0	X	X	2
(South Korea) Kang Bo-bae 🔨	1	1	3	0	0	2	X	X	7

==== Draw 11 ====
Thursday, November 6, 3:30 pm

Sheet A	1	2	3	4	5	6	7	8	Final
(Switzerland) Xenia Schwaller 🔨	2	0	2	0	1	0	0	1	6
(Japan) Ikue Kitazawa	0	3	0	2	0	1	1	0	7

==== Draw 12 ====
Thursday, November 6, 7:30 pm

Sheet A	1	2	3	4	5	6	7	8	Final
(Japan) Sayaka Yoshimura 🔨	1	0	1	0	2	1	0	1	6
(Japan) Team Tabata	0	2	0	2	0	0	1	0	5

Sheet D	1	2	3	4	5	6	7	8	Final
(Ontario) Rachel Homan 🔨	0	1	2	0	1	0	2	2	8
(Manitoba) Team Lawes	1	0	0	1	0	1	0	0	3

==== Draw 13 ====
Friday, November 7, 8:00 am

Sheet B	1	2	3	4	5	6	7	8	Final
(South Korea) Ha Seung-youn 🔨	1	0	1	0	3	0	0	3	8
(Japan) Ikue Kitazawa	0	1	0	3	0	2	0	0	6

Sheet C	1	2	3	4	5	6	7	8	Final
(Switzerland) Xenia Schwaller 🔨	0	3	0	1	0	1	4	X	9
(Scotland) Team Morrison	1	0	1	0	1	0	0	X	3

==== Draw 14 ====
Friday, November 7, 11:30 am

Sheet A	1	2	3	4	5	6	7	8	Final
(Switzerland) Silvana Tirinzoni 🔨	3	0	0	2	1	2	X	X	8
(China) Wang Rui	0	2	1	0	0	0	X	X	3

Sheet B	1	2	3	4	5	6	7	8	Final
(Japan) Team Tabata 🔨	1	0	0	1	0	2	0	1	5
(Manitoba) Team Lawes	0	1	2	0	2	0	1	0	6

==== Draw 15 ====
Friday, November 7, 3:30 pm

Sheet A	1	2	3	4	5	6	7	8	Final
(Manitoba) Kerri Einarson	0	0	2	0	3	0	2	0	7
(Japan) Satsuki Fujisawa 🔨	2	1	0	2	0	2	0	1	8

Sheet C	1	2	3	4	5	6	7	8	Final
(Ontario) Rachel Homan	0	4	2	1	3	X	X	X	10
(Japan) Sayaka Yoshimura 🔨	3	0	0	0	0	X	X	X	3

==== Draw 16 ====
Friday, November 7, 7:30 pm

Sheet A	1	2	3	4	5	6	7	8	Final
(South Korea) Gim Eun-ji 🔨	3	0	4	0	2	X	X	X	9
(South Korea) Kang Bo-bae	0	2	0	1	0	X	X	X	3

Sheet C	1	2	3	4	5	6	7	8	9	Final
(Sweden) Anna Hasselborg	0	1	0	1	0	1	0	1	0	4
(Sweden) Isabella Wranå 🔨	1	0	0	0	1	0	2	0	1	5

=== Tiebreakers ===
Saturday, November 8, 8:00 am

Sheet A	1	2	3	4	5	6	7	8	Final
(Manitoba) Kerri Einarson 🔨	0	0	0	0	0	X	X	X	0
(South Korea) Kang Bo-bae	0	1	1	4	1	X	X	X	7

Sheet C	1	2	3	4	5	6	7	8	Final
(Japan) Ikue Kitazawa	0	0	0	0	2	X	X	X	2
(South Korea) Gim Eun-ji 🔨	4	1	1	1	0	X	X	X	7

=== Playoffs ===
Quarterfinals
1	(Ontario) Rachel Homan	7
8	(South Korea) Kang Bo-bae	2
4	(Sweden) Anna Hasselborg	7
5	(Japan) Sayaka Yoshimura	6
2	(Switzerland) Silvana Tirinzoni	6
7	(South Korea) Gim Eun-ji	4
3	(Switzerland) Xenia Schwaller	5
6	(Japan) Satsuki Fujisawa	4

Semifinals
1	(Ontario) Rachel Homan	6
4	(Sweden) Anna Hasselborg	3
2	(Switzerland) Silvana Tirinzoni	6
3	(Switzerland) Xenia Schwaller	4

Final
1	(Ontario) Rachel Homan	7
2	(Switzerland) Silvana Tirinzoni	4

==== Quarterfinals ====
Saturday, November 8, 11:30 am

Sheet A	1	2	3	4	5	6	7	8	9	Final
(Sweden) Anna Hasselborg 🔨	2	0	0	2	0	1	1	0	1	7
(Japan) Sayaka Yoshimura	0	3	1	0	1	0	0	1	0	6

Sheet B	1	2	3	4	5	6	7	8	Final
(Switzerland) Silvana Tirinzoni 🔨	2	0	0	2	0	2	0	X	6
(South Korea) Gim Eun-ji	0	1	1	0	1	0	1	X	4

Sheet C	1	2	3	4	5	6	7	8	Final
(Switzerland) Xenia Schwaller 🔨	0	0	1	0	2	1	0	1	5
(Japan) Satsuki Fujisawa	0	1	0	2	0	0	1	0	4

Sheet D	1	2	3	4	5	6	7	8	Final
(Ontario) Rachel Homan 🔨	3	0	1	1	2	0	X	X	7
(South Korea) Kang Bo-bae	0	1	0	0	0	1	X	X	2

==== Semifinals ====
Saturday, November 8, 7:30 pm

Sheet B	1	2	3	4	5	6	7	8	Final
(Ontario) Rachel Homan 🔨	1	1	0	0	2	2	0	X	6
(Sweden) Anna Hasselborg	0	0	0	2	0	0	1	X	3

Sheet A	1	2	3	4	5	6	7	8	Final
(Switzerland) Silvana Tirinzoni 🔨	2	0	1	0	1	0	2	X	6
(Switzerland) Xenia Schwaller	0	1	0	1	0	2	0	X	4

==== Final ====
Sunday, November 9, 4:00 pm

Sheet C	1	2	3	4	5	6	7	8	Final
(Ontario) Rachel Homan	1	0	1	0	1	0	2	2	7
(Switzerland) Silvana Tirinzoni 🔨	0	2	0	1	0	1	0	0	4

=== Player percentages ===
Final Round Robin Percentages

Leads	%
(Switzerland) Selina Witschonke	85.40
(Manitoba) Kristin Gordon	83.40
(Ontario) Sarah Wilkes	82.30
(South Korea) Kim Su-jin	81.60
(South Korea) Kim Ji-soo	81.00
(Scotland) Sophie Jackson (Skip)	80.60
(South Korea) Seol Ye-eun	80.30
(Switzerland) Selina Rychiger	79.80
(Japan) Hasumi Ishigooka	79.70
(Japan) Mikoto Nakajima	76.90
(Manitoba) Karlee Burgess	76.50
(Japan) Yurika Yoshida	76.20
(Sweden) Sofia Scharback	75.10
(Sweden) Linda Stenlund	74.00
(China) Jiang Jiayi	73.00
(Japan) Anna Ohmiya	71.20

Seconds	%
(Switzerland) Fabienne Rieder	82.10
(South Korea) Kim Su-ji	78.90
(Switzerland) Carole Howald	76.90
(Ontario) Emma Miskew	74.90
(Sweden) Agnes Knochenhauer	74.60
(Scotland) Sophie Sinclair	74.50
(Manitoba) Jocelyn Peterman	74.10
(Japan) Sae Yamamoto	73.40
(South Korea) Yang Tae-i	71.90
(Sweden) Maria Larsson	70.30
(Japan) Yuna Kotani	69.70
(Japan) Yumi Suzuki	69.50
(Japan) Minori Suzuki	68.40
(South Korea) Kim Min-seo	68.00
(China) Dong Ziqi	67.30
(Manitoba) Shannon Birchard	62.90

Thirds	%
(Switzerland) Selina Gafner	80.70
(Ontario) Tracy Fleury	78.90
(South Korea) Kim Min-ji	76.60
(Switzerland) Silvana Tirinzoni (Skip)	75.30
(Japan) Seina Nakajima	74.50
(Japan) Chinami Yoshida	72.20
(South Korea) Kim Hye-rin	71.90
(Japan) Momoha Tabata	70.90
(Sweden) Sara McManus	70.70
(Manitoba) Val Sweeting	69.00
(China) Han Yu	68.00
(Japan) Kaho Onodera	67.00
(Manitoba) Selena Njegovan (Skip)	66.30
(South Korea) Shim Yu-jeong	62.70
(Scotland) Jennifer Dodds	62.60
(Sweden) Almida de Val	54.00

Skips	%
(Switzerland) Alina Pätz (Fourth)	81.30
(Ontario) Rachel Homan	81.30
(Switzerland) Xenia Schwaller	75.10
(Japan) Ikue Kitazawa	70.80
(Sweden) Anna Hasselborg	70.60
(Scotland) Rebecca Morrison (Fourth)	68.50
(Manitoba) Kerri Einarson	67.30
(China) Wang Rui	66.30
(South Korea) Gim Eun-ji	65.20
(Sweden) Isabella Wranå	65.00
(Japan) Miku Nihira	64.10
(Manitoba) Kaitlyn Lawes (Fourth)	63.50
(South Korea) Kang Bo-bae	62.00
(Japan) Sayaka Yoshimura	60.80
(South Korea) Ha Seung-youn	59.40
(Japan) Satsuki Fujisawa	59.20
