= 2019 Canadian Junior Curling Championships =

2019 New Holland Canadian Junior Curling Championships
- Host city: Prince Albert, Saskatchewan
- Arena: Art Hauser Centre; Prince Albert Golf & Curling Club
- Dates: January 19–27
- Men's winner: British Columbia
- Skip: Tyler Tardi
- Third: Sterling Middleton
- Second: Matthew Hall
- Lead: Alex Horvath
- Coach: Paul Tardi
- Finalist: Manitoba (J.T. Ryan)
- Women's winner: Alberta
- Skip: Selena Sturmay
- Third: Abby Marks
- Second: Kate Goodhelpsen
- Lead: Paige Papley
- Coach: Amanda St-Laurent
- Finalist: British Columbia (Sarah Daniels)

The 2019 New Holland Canadian Junior Curling Championships was held from January 19 to 27 at the Art Hauser Centre in Prince Albert, Saskatchewan. The winners represented Canada at the 2019 World Junior Curling Championships in Liverpool, Nova Scotia.

== Men ==
=== Round-robin standings ===
Key
Teams to championship pool
Teams to tiebreakers

Pool A	Skip	W	L
British Columbia	Tyler Tardi	6	0
Saskatchewan	Rylan Kleiter	5	1
Newfoundland and Labrador	Greg Blyde	3	3
Alberta	Desmond Young	3	3
Ontario	Samuel Steep	3	3
Yukon	Trygg Jensen	1	5
Nunavut	Javen Komaksiutiksak	0	6

Pool B	Skip	W	L
Manitoba	J.T. Ryan	4	2
Northern Ontario	Tanner Horgan	4	2
Nova Scotia	Graeme Weagle	4	2
Quebec	Vincent Roberge	4	2
New Brunswick	Jack Smeltzer	3	3
Prince Edward Island	Tyler Smith	2	4
Northwest Territories	Sawer Kaeser	0	6

=== Championship pool standings ===
Key
Teams to playoffs

Province	Skip	W	L
British Columbia	Tyler Tardi	9	1
Saskatchewan	Rylan Kleiter	8	2
Manitoba	J.T. Ryan	7	3
Northern Ontario	Tanner Horgan	6	4
Alberta	Desmond Young	5	5
Quebec	Vincent Roberge	5	5
Newfoundland and Labrador	Greg Blyde	5	5
Nova Scotia	Graeme Weagle	4	6

=== Playoffs ===
Semifinal			Final
			1	British Columbia	7
2	Saskatchewan	3	3	Manitoba	5
3	Manitoba	9

=== Semifinal ===
Saturday, January 26, 19:00

Sheet D	1	2	3	4	5	6	7	8	9	10	Final
Saskatchewan (Kleiter) 🔨	0	0	0	0	0	1	0	2	0	X	3
Manitoba (Ryan)	0	1	0	0	1	0	3	0	4	X	9

Player percentages
Saskatchewan		Manitoba	
Matthieu Taillon	86%	Cole Chandler	89%
Joshua Mattern	81%	Jordan Peters	82%
Trevor Johnson	72%	Jacques Gauthier	78%
Rylan Kleiter	70%	J.T. Ryan	85%
Total	78%	Total	83%

=== Final ===
Sunday, January 27, 15:00

Sheet D	1	2	3	4	5	6	7	8	9	10	Final
British Columbia (Tardi) 🔨	0	3	0	0	0	0	0	2	1	1	7
Manitoba (Ryan)	0	0	0	2	2	0	1	0	0	0	5

Player percentages
British Columbia		Manitoba	
Alex Horvath	94%	Cole Chandler	88%
Matthew Hall	84%	Jordan Peters	83%
Sterling Middleton	88%	Jacques Gauthier	78%
Tyler Tardi	83%	J.T. Ryan	82%
Total	87%	Total	82%

== Women ==
=== Round-robin standings ===
Key
Teams to championship pool

Pool A	Skip	W	L
Alberta	Selena Sturmay	6	0
British Columbia	Sarah Daniels	5	1
Nova Scotia	Kaitlyn Jones	4	2
Northern Ontario	Kira Brunton	3	3
Ontario	Thea Coburn	2	4
Saskatchewan (Host)	Skylar Ackerman	1	5
Nunavut	Sadie Pinksen	0	6

Pool B	Skip	W	L
Manitoba	Mackenzie Zacharias	5	1
Quebec	Laurie St-Georges	5	1
New Brunswick	Justine Comeau	4	2
Saskatchewan	Rachel Erickson	4	2
Newfoundland and Labrador	Mackenzie Glynn	2	4
Prince Edward Island	Lauren Ferguson	1	5
Northwest Territories	Tyanna Bain	0	6

=== Championship pool standings ===
Key
Teams to playoffs
Teams to tiebreakers

Province	Skip	W	L
Alberta	Selena Sturmay	10	0
Nova Scotia	Kaitlyn Jones	7	3
British Columbia	Sarah Daniels	7	3
Quebec	Laurie St-Georges	7	3
Manitoba	Mackenzie Zacharias	6	4
Northern Ontario	Kira Brunton	5	5
Saskatchewan	Rachel Erickson	5	5
New Brunswick	Justine Comeau	5	5

=== Tiebreaker ===
Friday, January 25, 14:00

Sheet C	1	2	3	4	5	6	7	8	9	10	Final
British Columbia (Daniels)	0	1	0	1	0	0	4	0	0	2	8
Quebec (St-Georges) 🔨	0	0	2	0	0	2	0	2	0	0	6

Player percentages
British Columbia		Quebec	
Sarah Loken	84%	Noemie Gauthier	84%
Jessica Humphries	79%	Emily Riley	75%
Kayla MacMillan	89%	Cynthia St-Georges	78%
Sarah Daniels	76%	Laurie St-Georges	79%
Total	82%	Total	79%

=== Playoffs ===
Semifinal			Final
			1	Alberta	9
2	Nova Scotia	7	3	British Columbia	6
3	British Columbia	9

=== Semifinal ===
Saturday, January 26, 13:00

Sheet D	1	2	3	4	5	6	7	8	9	10	Final
Nova Scotia (Jones)	0	1	0	2	0	1	1	0	2	0	7
British Columbia (Daniels) 🔨	1	0	4	0	1	0	0	2	0	1	9

Player percentages
Nova Scotia		British Columbia	
Lindsey Burgess	88%	Sarah Loken	89%
Karlee Burgess	88%	Jessica Humphries	83%
Lauren Lenentine	93%	Kayla MacMillan	89%
Kaitlyn Jones	80%	Sarah Daniels	74%
Total	87%	Total	83%

=== Final ===
Sunday, January 27, 10:00

Sheet D	1	2	3	4	5	6	7	8	9	10	Final
Alberta (Sturmay) 🔨	0	1	1	2	1	0	1	0	3	X	9
British Columbia (Daniels)	1	0	0	0	0	2	0	3	0	X	6

Player percentages
Alberta		British Columbia	
Paige Papley	83%	Sarah Loken	91%
Kate Goodhelpsen	79%	Jessica Humphries	71%
Abby Marks	75%	Kayla MacMillan	78%
Selena Sturmay	72%	Sarah Daniels	62%
Total	77%	Total	76%

== Qualification ==
=== Manitoba ===
The Canola Junior Provincial Championship presented by Telus were held from January 3, 2019 - January 7, 2019 at the Heather Curling Club in Winnipeg, Manitoba.

The championship was held in a round robin format, which qualified four teams for a page-playoff championship round.

Pre-Playoff Results:

Men	W	L
Asham Black Group
JT Ryan (AMCC)	7	0
Brayden Payette (Brandon)	5	2
Jordon McDonald (St. Vital)	5	2
Ghislain Courcelles (St. Vital)	3	4
Carter Watkins (Fort Rouge)	3	4
Josh Maisey (Winnipeg Beach)	3	4
Marc Vachon (Brandon)	2	5
Carter Williamson (Dauphin)	0	7
Asham Express Red Group
Brett Walter (AMCC)	6	1
Ryan Wiebe (St. Vital)	6	1
Zachary Wasylik (Charleswood)	5	2
Jordan Johnson (St. Vital)	4	3
Thomas Dunlop (East St. Paul)	4	3
Joshua Friesen (AMCC)	1	6
Tyson Beyak (Winnipegosis)	1	6
Thomas Titchkosky (Morden)	1	6

Women	W	L
Asham Black Group
Shae Bevan (St. Vital)	6	1
Mackenzie Zacharias (Altona)	6	1
Alex Friesen (AMCC)	4	3
Emma Jensen (Dauphin)	3	4
Arah Davies (St. Vital)	3	4
Katy Lukowich (East St. Paul)	3	4
Cassandra Stobbe (AMCC)	2	5
Makenna Hadway (Dauphin)	1	6
Asham Express Red Group
Meghan Walter (Elmwood)	7	0
Hayley Bergman (Morris)	6	1
Presley Sagert (Swan River)	3	4
Victoria Beaudry (St. Vital)	3	4
Serena Gray-Withers (Granite)	3	4
Stacy Sime (Brandon)	2	5
Talyia Tober (AMCC)	2	5
Grace Beaudry (St. Vital)	2	5

Playoff Results:

- Men's A1 vs B1: Ryan 8 - Walter 6
- Men's A2 vs B2: McDonald 7 - Wiebe 4
- Men's Semifinal: McDonald 8 - Walter 6
- Men's Final: Ryan 10 - McDonald 1
- Women's A1 vs B1: Walter 10 - Bevan 5
- Women's A2 vs B2: Zacharias 11 - Bergman 6
- Women's Semifinal: Zacharias 8 - Bevan 1
- Women's Final: Zacharias 8 - Walter 2

=== New Brunswick ===
The New Brunswick Papa John's Pizza U21 Championships were held from December 27–30, 2018 at the Capital Winter Club in Fredericton, New Brunswick.

The championship was held in a modified triple-knockout format, which qualified three teams for a championship round.

Pre-Playoff Results:

Men	W	L
Jack Smeltzer (Fredericton)	4	1
Liam Marin (Thistle)	5	2
Emmanuel Porter (Gage)	3	3
Josh Nowlan (Moncton)	3	3
Coady Lewis (Moncton)	2	3
Jamie Stewart (Thistle)	1	3
Sullivan Goodine (Woodstock)	0	3

Women	W	L
Justine Comeau (Fredericton)	7	0
Erica Cluff (Woodstock)	4	3
Julia Hunter (Sackville)	3	3
Melodie Forsythe (Moncton)	3	3
Brooke Tracy (Gladstone)	1	3
Melissa Michaud (Grand Falls)	1	3
Paige Brewer (Thistle)	1	3
Kate Paterson (Carleton)	1	3

Playoff Results:

- Men's Semifinal: Smeltzer 9 - Marin 6
- Men's Final (N/A): Smeltzer - Smeltzer
- No women's playoff was required as Team Comeau won all three qualifying events.

=== Nova Scotia ===
The AMJ Campbell U21 Championships were held from December 27–31, 2018 at the Lakeshore Curling Club in Lower Sackville, Nova Scotia.

The championship was held in a modified triple-knockout format, which qualified three teams for a championship round.

Pre-Playoff Results:

Men	W	L
Graeme Weagle (Chester)	6	1
Matthew Manuel (Halifax)	4	2
Nick Mosher (CFB Halifax)	4	3
Mitchell Cortello (Mayflower)	3	3
Ethan Young (Mayflower)	2	3
Justin Gray (Mayflower)	2	3
Ryan Strang (Lakeshore)	0	3
Calan MacIsaac (Truro)	0	3

Women	W	L
Kaitlyn Jones (Halifax)	6	1
Isabelle Ladouceur (Lakeshore)	4	2
Cally Moore (Mayflower)	4	3
Shaelyn Park (Wolfville)	2	3
Kaylee Nodding (Bridgewater)	2	3
Clara Mosher (NSCA)	2	3
Charity Cole (Lakeshore)	1	3
Stephanie Carson (Dartmouth)	0	3

Playoff Results:

- Men's Semifinal: Manuel 8 - Weagle 4
- Men's Final: Weagle 10 - Manuel 4
- Women's Semifinal: Jones 10 - Ladouceur 3
- Women's Final (N/A): Jones - Jones

=== Ontario ===
The Ontario U21 Provincial Championships were held December 27–30, 2018 at the Annandale Golf & Curling Club in Ajax.

Pre-Playoff Results:

Men	W	L
Samuel Steep (Galt)	5	2
Sam Mooibroek (Galt)	5	2
Aiden Poole (Chatham Granite)	4	3
Cameron Goodkey (RCMP)	4	3
Ryan Hahn (Rideau)	4	3
Joey Hart (Whitby)	3	4
Landan Rooney (Dixie)	3	4
Connor Massey (Bayview)	0	7

Women	W	L
Veronica Bernard (Elmira)	6	1
Emma Wallingford (Carleton Heights)	4	3
Thea Coburn (Dundas Valley)	4	3
Courtney Auld (Cataraqui)	4	3
Lindsay Kastrau (Ottawa Hunt)	3	4
Madelyn Warriner (Listowel)	3	4
Kayla Gray (Perth)	2	5
Mackenzie Kiemele (Elora)	2	5

Playoff Results:

- Men's Tiebreaker: Poole 4 - Goodkey 2
- Men's Semifinal: Mooibroek 8 - Poole 2
- Men's Final: Steep 8 - Mooibroek 7
- Women's Tiebreaker: Coburn 6 - Auld 5
- Women's Semifinal: Coburn 7 - Wallinford 6
- Women's Final: Coburn 9 - Bernard 5

=== Prince Edward Island ===
The Pepsi PEI Provincial Junior Curling Championships were held from December 27–30, 2018 at the Charlottetown Curling Club in Charlottetown, Prince Edward Island.

The championship was held in a modified triple-knockout format, which qualified three teams for a championship round.

Pre-Playoff Results:

Men	W	L
Tyler Smith (Charlottetown)	6	0
Chase MacMillan (Charlottetown)	2	3
Brayden Snow (Summerside)	1	3
Mitchell Schut (Cornwall)	0	3

Women	W	L
Lauren Ferguson (Cornwall)	7	0
Rachel MacLean (Cornwall)	3	3
Annika Kelly (Cornwall)	2	3
Emily Sanderson (Cornwall)	2	3
Sydney Howatt (Cornwall)	1	3
Clara Jack (Cornwall)	0	3

Playoff Results:

- No playoff games were required as Team Smith and Team Ferguson both won all three qualifying events.
