= Matthieu Taillon =

Canadian curler

- Curler
- Born: September 11, 1998 (age 28); Saskatoon, Saskatchewan, Canada

Team
- Curling club: Sutherland CC, Saskatoon, SK

Curling career
- Member Association: Saskatchewan
- Top CTRS ranking: 18th (2022–23)

Matthieu Taillon (born September 11, 1998) is a Canadian curler from Saskatoon, Saskatchewan. He was the longtime lead on Team Rylan Kleiter. Team Kleiter was known for their brightly coloured paint splash pants.

== Career ==
Taillon and his rink of Rylan Kleiter, Trevor Johnson and Joshua Mattern represented Saskatchewan internationally for the first time at the 2015 U18 International Curling Championships where they finished with a 2–3 round robin record, unfortunately missing the playoffs. The team was able to win their two consolation games however, winning the C Event. Team Kleiter won the U18 provincial championship once again in 2017. They represented Saskatchewan at the 2017 Canadian U18 Curling Championships in Moncton, New Brunswick and topped their pool with a 4–1 record. Two more wins in the championship pool qualified them for the playoffs as the second seed. They lost the semifinal against Nova Scotia and the bronze medal game against British Columbia, unfortunately not winning a medal. They also won the U21 provincial in 2017, sending them to the 2017 Canadian Junior Curling Championships. Like their first trip to the U18's in 2015, they didn't qualify for the playoffs, finishing 2–3.

Team Kleiter returned to the junior championship again in 2018 but this time finished with a worse record of 1–5. The following season they once again won the provincial juniors and represented Saskatchewan on home ice at the 2019 Canadian Junior Curling Championships in Prince Albert. This year, the Saskatchewan team had a great showing, going 8–2 in the round robin and championship pool to secure a playoff berth. Their run ended in the semifinal however, losing to Manitoba's JT Ryan. Also during the 2018–19 season, Team Kleiter was invited to the 2019 Canadian Open Grand Slam of Curling event as the sponsors exemption. They played against the top teams in the country, losing all three of their triple knockout games to Kevin Koe, Brad Jacobs and Reid Carruthers.

In their last year of junior eligibility, Team Kleiter won their fourth straight provincial junior title and once again a spot at the 2020 Canadian Junior Curling Championships. They would once again have a great showing at nationals, qualifying for the playoffs with a 7–3 record and as the third seed. In a narrow semifinal against Newfoundland and Labrador, Team Saskatchewan gave up a key five ender in the eighth end, ultimately losing the game 9–8.

== Personal life ==
Taillon is currently a physiology and pharmacology student at the University of Saskatchewan.

== Teams ==
| Season | Skip | Third | Second | Lead |
|---|---|---|---|---|
| 2014–15 | Rylan Kleiter | Trevor Johnson | Joshua Mattern | Matthieu Taillon |
| 2015–16 | Rylan Kleiter | Trevor Johnson | Joshua Mattern | Matthieu Taillon |
| 2016–17 | Rylan Kleiter | Trevor Johnson | Joshua Mattern | Matthieu Taillon |
| 2017–18 | Rylan Kleiter | Trevor Johnson | Joshua Mattern | Matthieu Taillon |
| 2018–19 | Rylan Kleiter | Trevor Johnson | Joshua Mattern | Matthieu Taillon |
| 2019–20 | Rylan Kleiter | Trevor Johnson | Joshua Mattern | Matthieu Taillon |
| 2020–21 | Rylan Kleiter | Joshua Mattern | Trevor Johnson | Matthieu Taillon |
| 2021–22 | Rylan Kleiter | Joshua Mattern | Trevor Johnson | Matthieu Taillon |
| 2022–23 | Rylan Kleiter | Joshua Mattern | Trevor Johnson | Matthieu Taillon |
