= Rylan Kleiter =

Canadian curler (born 1998)

- Curler
- Born: July 4, 1998 (age 28); Saskatoon, Saskatchewan, Canada

Team
- Curling club: Sutherland CC, Saskatoon, SK
- Skip: Mike McEwen
- Third: Rylan Kleiter
- Second: Joshua Mattern
- Lead: Trevor Johnson

Curling career
- Member Association: Saskatchewan
- Brier: 1 (2025)
- Top CTRS ranking: 6th (2024–25)
Medal record
Men's curling
Representing Canada
World Junior Curling Championships
Gold medal – first place	2019 Liverpool

Rylan Kleiter (born July 4, 1998) is a Canadian curler from Saskatoon, Saskatchewan. He currently plays third on Team Mike McEwen. In juniors, while skipping his own team, Team Kleiter were known for their brightly-coloured paint splash pants.

== Curling career ==
=== Juniors ===
Kleiter and his rink of Trevor Johnson, Joshua Mattern and Matthieu Taillon represented Saskatchewan internationally for the first time at the 2015 U18 International Curling Championships where he skipped the team to a 2–3 round robin record, unfortunately missing the playoffs. The team was able to win their two consolation games however, winning the C Event. Team Kleiter won the U18 provincial championship once again in 2017. They represented Saskatchewan at the 2017 Canadian U18 Curling Championships in Moncton, New Brunswick and topped their pool with a 4–1 record. Two more wins in the championship pool qualified them for the playoffs as the second seed. They lost the semifinal against Nova Scotia and the bronze medal game against British Columbia, unfortunately not winning a medal. They also won the U21 provincial in 2017, sending them to the 2017 Canadian Junior Curling Championships. Like their first trip to the U18's in 2015, they didn't qualify for the playoffs, finishing 2–3.

Team Kleiter returned to the junior championship again in 2018 but this time finished with a worse record of 1–5. The following season they once again won the provincial juniors and represented Saskatchewan on home ice at the 2019 Canadian Junior Curling Championships in Prince Albert. This year, the Saskatchewan team had a great showing, going 8–2 in the round robin and championship pool to secure a playoff berth. Their run ended in the semifinal however, losing to Manitoba's JT Ryan. With their good showing, Kleiter was asked to be Tyler Tardi's alternate at the 2019 World Junior Curling Championships. They only lost two games en route to the World Junior Curling Championship championship title and gold medal. Kleiter played in three games during the tournament. Also during the 2018–19 season, Team Kleiter was invited to the 2019 Canadian Open Grand Slam of Curling event as the sponsors exemption. They played against the top teams in the country, losing all three of their triple knockout games to Kevin Koe, Brad Jacobs and Reid Carruthers.

In their last year of junior eligibility, Team Kleiter won their fourth straight provincial junior title and once again a spot at the 2020 Canadian Junior Curling Championships. They would once again have a great showing at nationals, qualifying for the playoffs with a 7–3 record and as the third seed. In a narrow semifinal against Newfoundland and Labrador, Team Saskatchewan gave up a key five ender in the eighth end, ultimately losing the game 9–8.

=== Mens ===
Kleiter started finding success in men's play during the 2023-24 curling season, where he skipped a team alongside junior teammates Mattern and Johnson, and with Matthew Hall as second. The team finished in second place at the 2024 SaskTel Tankard, the provincial men's curling championship, losing to Mike McEwen 7–3 in the final. In their second season together, the team found even more success, winning the Tier 2 event of the 2024 Tour Challenge Grand Slam event. This win automatically qualified the team for the 2025 Masters Grand Slam event, where they finished with a 1–3 record. Shortly after their Grand Slam event, Kleiter also won their first SaskTel Tankard, beating Steve Laycock 8–5 in the final, qualifying them to represent Saskatchewan at the 2025 Montana's Brier. At the 2025 Brier, Kleiter finished with a 3–5 record.

=== Mixed Doubles ===
Kleiter began curling with Brittany Tran during the 2024-25 curling season, and the pair found immediate success, qualifying for the 2025 Canadian Mixed Doubles Curling Olympic Trials by defeating Lisa Weagle and John Epping 6–3 in the final of the first Direct-Entry Qualifier event. Tran / Kleiter had a strong showing at their first Olympic Trials, finishing in 4th place, losing to Rachel Homan and Brendan Bottcher in the 3 vs 4 game.

Kleiter also competed with Nancy Martin at the 2026 Canadian Mixed Doubles Curling Championship.

== Football ==
In addition to curling, Kleiter also played Canadian football in his youth. While attending the University of Regina, he played for the Regina Rams football team as a placekicker/receiver. Before attending the University of Regina, he played for the Saskatoon Hilltops in the Canadian Junior Football League from 2016 to 2019.

== Personal life ==
Kleiter is currently a senior accountant with Ernst & Young LLP. He is married. He studied accounting at the University of Saskatchewan. His father Dean Kleiter represented Saskatchewan twice at the Tim Hortons Brier in 2001 and 2003. His mother is named Sherry.

== Grand Slam record ==
Key
C	Champion
F	Lost in Final
SF	Lost in Semifinal
QF	Lost in Quarterfinals
R16	Lost in the round of 16
Q	Did not advance to playoffs
T2	Played in Tier 2 event
DNP	Did not participate in event
N/A	Not a Grand Slam event that season

Event	2018–19	2019–20	2020–21	2021–22	2022–23	2023–24	2024–25	2025–26
Masters	DNP	DNP	N/A	DNP	DNP	DNP	Q	Q
Tour Challenge	DNP	DNP	N/A	N/A	DNP	T2	T2	Q
The National	DNP	DNP	N/A	N/A	DNP	DNP	DNP	Q
Canadian Open	Q	DNP	N/A	N/A	DNP	DNP	Q	Q

== Teams ==
Season	Skip	Third	Second	Lead
2014–15	Rylan Kleiter	Trevor Johnson	Joshua Mattern	Matthieu Taillon
2015–16	Rylan Kleiter	Trevor Johnson	Joshua Mattern	Matthieu Taillon
2016–17	Rylan Kleiter	Trevor Johnson	Joshua Mattern	Matthieu Taillon
2017–18	Rylan Kleiter	Trevor Johnson	Joshua Mattern	Matthieu Taillon
2018–19	Rylan Kleiter	Trevor Johnson	Joshua Mattern	Matthieu Taillon
2019–20	Rylan Kleiter	Trevor Johnson	Joshua Mattern	Matthieu Taillon
2020–21	Rylan Kleiter	Joshua Mattern	Trevor Johnson	Matthieu Taillon
2021–22	Rylan Kleiter	Joshua Mattern	Trevor Johnson	Matthieu Taillon
2022–23	Rylan Kleiter	Joshua Mattern	Trevor Johnson	Matthieu Taillon
2023–24	Rylan Kleiter	Joshua Mattern	Matthew Hall	Trevor Johnson
2024–25	Rylan Kleiter	Joshua Mattern	Matthew Hall	Trevor Johnson
2025–26	Rylan Kleiter	Matthew Hall	Joshua Mattern	Trevor Johnson
2026–27	Mike McEwen	Rylan Kleiter	Joshua Mattern	Trevor Johnson
