= Trevor Johnson (curler) =

Canadian curler

- Curler
- Born: November 15, 1998 (age 27); Saskatoon, Saskatchewan, Canada

Team
- Curling club: Sutherland CC, Saskatoon, SK
- Skip: Mike McEwen
- Third: Rylan Kleiter
- Second: Joshua Mattern
- Lead: Trevor Johnson

Curling career
- Member Association: Saskatchewan
- Brier: 1 (2025)
- Top CTRS ranking: 6th (2024–25)

Trevor Johnson (born November 15, 1998) is a Canadian curler from Saskatoon, Saskatchewan. He currently plays lead on Team Mike McEwen. He previously played for Rylan Kleiter on a team known for their brightly coloured paint splash pants.

== Career ==
=== Juniors ===
Johnson and his rink of Rylan Kleiter, Joshua Mattern and Matthieu Taillon represented Saskatchewan internationally for the first time at the 2015 U18 International Curling Championships where they finished with a 2–3 round robin record, unfortunately missing the playoffs. The team was able to win their two consolation games however, winning the C Event. Team Kleiter won the U18 provincial championship once again in 2017. They represented Saskatchewan at the 2017 Canadian U18 Curling Championships in Moncton, New Brunswick and topped their pool with a 4–1 record. Two more wins in the championship pool qualified them for the playoffs as the second seed. They lost the semifinal against Nova Scotia and the bronze medal game against British Columbia, unfortunately not winning a medal. They also won the U21 provincial in 2017, sending them to the 2017 Canadian Junior Curling Championships. Like their first trip to the U18's in 2015, they didn't qualify for the playoffs, finishing 2–3.

Team Kleiter returned to the junior championship again in 2018 but this time finished with a worse record of 1–5. The following season they once again won the provincial juniors and represented Saskatchewan on home ice at the 2019 Canadian Junior Curling Championships in Prince Albert. This year, the Saskatchewan team had a great showing, going 8–2 in the round robin and championship pool to secure a playoff berth. Their run ended in the semifinal however, losing to Manitoba's JT Ryan. Also during the 2018–19 season, Team Kleiter was invited to the 2019 Canadian Open Grand Slam of Curling event as the sponsors exemption. They played against the top teams in the country, losing all three of their triple knockout games to Kevin Koe, Brad Jacobs and Reid Carruthers.

In their last year of junior eligibility, Team Kleiter won their fourth straight provincial junior title and once again a spot at the 2020 Canadian Junior Curling Championships. They would once again have a great showing at nationals, qualifying for the playoffs with a 7–3 record and as the third seed. In a narrow semifinal against Newfoundland and Labrador, Team Saskatchewan gave up a key five ender in the eighth end, ultimately losing the game 9–8.

=== Men's ===
Johnson started finding success in men's play during the 2023-24 curling season, where he continued playing with Kleiter as skip and teammate Mattern, and added Matthew Hall as second. The team finished in second place at the 2024 SaskTel Tankard, the provincial men's curling championship, losing to Mike McEwen 7–3 in the final. In their second season together, the team found even more success, winning the Tier 2 event of the 2024 Tour Challenge Grand Slam event. This win automatically qualified the team for the 2025 Masters Grand Slam event, where they finished with a 1–3 record. Shortly after their Grand Slam event, Kleiter also won their first SaskTel Tankard, beating Steve Laycock 8–5 in the final, qualifying them to represent Saskatchewan at the 2025 Montana's Brier.

== Personal life ==
Johnson currently works as a manufacturing technician at Pleasure-Way Industries.

== Teams ==
Season	Skip	Third	Second	Lead
2014–15	Rylan Kleiter	Trevor Johnson	Joshua Mattern	Matthieu Taillon
2015–16	Rylan Kleiter	Trevor Johnson	Joshua Mattern	Matthieu Taillon
2016–17	Rylan Kleiter	Trevor Johnson	Joshua Mattern	Matthieu Taillon
2017–18	Rylan Kleiter	Trevor Johnson	Joshua Mattern	Matthieu Taillon
2018–19	Rylan Kleiter	Trevor Johnson	Joshua Mattern	Matthieu Taillon
2019–20	Rylan Kleiter	Trevor Johnson	Joshua Mattern	Matthieu Taillon
2020–21	Rylan Kleiter	Joshua Mattern	Trevor Johnson	Matthieu Taillon
2021–22	Rylan Kleiter	Joshua Mattern	Trevor Johnson	Matthieu Taillon
2022–23	Rylan Kleiter	Joshua Mattern	Trevor Johnson	Matthieu Taillon
2023–24	Rylan Kleiter	Joshua Mattern	Matthew Hall	Trevor Johnson
2024–25	Rylan Kleiter	Joshua Mattern	Matthew Hall	Trevor Johnson
2025–26	Rylan Kleiter	Matthew Hall	Joshua Mattern	Trevor Johnson
2026–27	Mike McEwen	Rylan Kleiter	Joshua Mattern	Trevor Johnson
