= Tanner Fetch =

Canadian lacrosse player

- Born: February 16, 1992 (age 33); Prince Albert, Saskatchewan
- Nationality: Canadian
- Height: 5 ft 11 in (1.80 m)
- Weight: 185 pounds (84 kg)
- Shoots: Right
- Position: Goaltender
- NLL teams: Panther City Lacrosse Club
- FIL team: Ireland Lacrosse
- CLA team Former teams: Saskatoon Brewers; Saskatchewan SWAT; Coquitlam Adanacs; Prince Albert Outlaws; Prince Albert Predators
- Nickname: Fetchy

Career highlights
- 2004 Team Canada West Goaltender; 2011 Bronze Medal at Founders Cup; 2017 Team Ireland Goaltender

Tanner Fetch (born February 16, 1992) is a former Canadian professional box lacrosse goaltender for Panther City Lacrosse Club of the National Lacrosse League and a professional sports analyst for the NLL on Bleacher Report Live. He also provides analysis for international lacrosse events, notably the annual World Junior Lacrosse Championship. Fetch played goaltender for the Irish National Team at the European Box Lacrosse Championships in Turku, Finland.

He was formerly the sportscaster on CBS Sports, NLL TV, and the Saskatchewan Rush.

== Biography ==
=== Playing career ===
==== Professional ====
Tanner signed a Pro Tryout contract with the Panther City Lacrosse Club and played two exhibition games with the team in 2021.

==== International ====
On the international stage, Tanner played for the Irish National Team at the 2017 European Box Lacrosse Championships in Turku, Finland. As a goalie, he also tended for the Irish Nationals at two European Box Lacrosse Invitational Tournaments and dawned the English colours when he played goal for the London Knights at the Aleš Hřebeský Memorial.

==== Senior ====
After graduating junior lacrosse, Fetch competed in the Presidents Cup National Championship for the Saskatoon Brewers winning two back to back B-Side Gold medals in 2017 and 2018.

==== Junior ====
Tanner began his Junior B career originally for the Prince Albert Predators of the Prairie Gold Lacrosse League before being signed by the Saskatchewan SWAT who play major junior in the Rocky Mountain Lacrosse League. He represented the SWAT at four major junior Founders Cup Championships during the 2010, 2011, 2012, and 2013 campaigns. During the 2011 Founders Cup National Championship, Fetch and the SWAT captured a bronze medal. During the 2010 and 2011 seasons, he played for the Coquitlam Adanacs in BC Junior A Lacrosse League under Curt Malawsky before returning to the Saskatchewan SWAT.

==== Minor ====
In 2004, Tanner shared goaltender duties with Frankie Scigliano when they represented Team Canada West at the 2004 Box Lacrosse Nationals All-Star Game under head coach Steve Toll of the NLL. That same year Fetch netminded for Team Saskatchewan, who went on to win B-Side gold at the National level. Fetch went on to represent Saskatchewan during the National Championship campaigns again in Whitby, Ontario in 2006 and Calgary, Alberta in 2008.

==== Field ====
Tanner played attack in field lacrosse, in 2017 he won the Newtownards Cup Championship and in 2018 he won the Irish Lacrosse League National Championship both with County Dublin Lacrosse Club.

=== Broadcasting ===
In 2018 Fetch worked as a play-by-play commentator for the National Lacrosse League on NLL TV and CBS Sports. In 2019 he returned as a colour commentator on Saskatchewan Rush broadcasts on CKBL-FM. He hosted the Saskatchewan Rush post game show Rush: After Hours, where he interviewed players and coaches and gave the final game analysis following each game. Tanner currently works as a game analyst and studio analyst for the NLL on BR Live. He also serves as floor reporter for all Saskatchewan Rush home games.

Fetch provided colour commentary and analysis for SHAW, SaskTel, and Lax All Stars broadcasts during the 2018 World Junior Lacrosse Championships in Saskatoon, Saskatchewan. He also provided colour commentary for the 2017 European Box Lacrosse Championships in Turku, Finland and for multiple Founders Cup national tournaments. Tanner was in Prague at the Aleš Hřebeský Memorial providing both play by play and colour commentary alongside Stephen Stamp.

=== Personal life ===
Aside from playing lacrosse, Fetch also played junior hockey and high school football. After attending Durham College in Oshawa, Ontario he worked at Warner Music Group in Toronto, Ontario as the artist services coordinator developing Warner's e-commerce storefront and merchandising for Warner's roster of artists. Tanner graduated from the Institute of Technology, Carlow in Carlow, Ireland in 2017 with a Business Honours degree in Media and Public Relations.

== Awards ==
- 2004 Team Canada West Goaltender
- 2011 Founders Cup Bronze Medalist
- 2016 Newtownards Cup Winner
- 2017 Irish Lacrosse League National Champions
