= 2024 Western Showdown =

2024 RBC Dominion Securities Western Showdown
- Host city: Swift Current, Saskatchewan
- Arena: Swift Current Curling Club
- Dates: December 12–16
- Men's winner: (Alberta) Team Koe
- Curling club: The Glencoe Club, Calgary
- Skip: Kevin Koe
- Third: Aaron Sluchinski
- Second: Tyler Tardi
- Lead: Karrick Martin
- Finalist: (Alberta) Brad Jacobs
- Women's winner: (Switzerland) Team Schwaller
- Curling club: GC Zurich, Zurich
- Skip: Xenia Schwaller
- Third: Selina Gafner
- Second: Fabienne Rieder
- Lead: Selina Rychiger
- Coach: Andreas Schwaller
- Finalist: (Saskatchewan) Michelle Englot

The 2024 RBC Dominion Securities Western Showdown was held from December 12 to 16 at the Swift Current Curling Club in Swift Current, Saskatchewan. The total purse for the event was $50,000 on the men's and women's sides.

The event was sponsored by Curling Stadium, a streaming service provided by CurlingZone. All of the games were streamed on CurlingZone and the Swift Current Curling Club's YouTube pages.

Despite not pulling the same number of international teams as the year prior, the event had a strong presence of Canadian teams, with seven of the top ten teams on the CTRS standings competing in both the men's and women's divisions.

== Men ==
=== Teams ===
The teams are listed as follows:

Skip	Third	Second	Lead	Alternate	Locale
Reid Carruthers	Catlin Schneider	Kyle Doering	Connor Njegovan		Winnipeg, Manitoba
Daniel Casper	Luc Violette	Ben Richardson	Aidan Oldenburg	Rich Ruohonen	(United States) Chaska, Minnesota
Korey Dropkin	Thomas Howell (Note: Lead Thomas Howell played third while Andrew Stopera and Mark Fenner each moved down the lineup a position.)	Andrew Stopera	Mark Fenner		(United States) Duluth, Minnesota
Matt Dunstone	Colton Lott	E. J. Harnden	Ryan Harnden		Winnipeg, Manitoba
John Epping	Jacob Horgan	Tanner Horgan	Ian McMillan		Sudbury, Ontario
Brad Gushue	Mark Nichols	Brendan Bottcher	Geoff Walker		St. John's, Newfoundland and Labrador
Drew Heidt	Mitch Heidt	Brad Heidt	Derek Schneider		Kerrobert, Saskatchewan
Brad Jacobs	Marc Kennedy	Brett Gallant	Ben Hebert		Calgary, Alberta
Dustin Kalthoff	Josh Heidt	Sam Wills	Mat Ring		Saskatoon, Saskatchewan
Rylan Kleiter	Joshua Mattern	Matthew Hall	Trevor Johnson		Saskatoon, Saskatchewan
Kelly Knapp	Brennen Jones	Mike Armstrong	Trent Knapp		Regina, Saskatchewan
Kevin Koe	Aaron Sluchinski	Tyler Tardi	Karrick Martin		Calgary, Alberta
Shaun Meachem	Jacques Gauthier (Note: Jacques Gauthier spared for Steve Laycock. He played third while third Shaun Meachem moved up to skip.)	Chris Haichert	Brayden Grindheim		Swift Current, Saskatchewan
Mike McEwen	Colton Flasch	Kevin Marsh	Dan Marsh		Saskatoon, Saskatchewan
Sam Mooibroek	Scott Mitchell	Adam McEachren (Note: Adam McEachren spared for Ryan Wiebe. He played second while second Scott Mitchell moved up to third.)	Nathan Steele		Whitby, Ontario
Brent Pierce	Matthew Blandford	Cody Johnston	Nicholas Umbach		New Westminster, British Columbia
Owen Purcell	Luke Saunders	Scott Saccary	Ryan Abraham		Halifax, Nova Scotia
Ethan Sampson	Coleman Thurston	Jacob Zeman	Marius Kleinas		(United States) Chaska, Minnesota
Charley Thomas	Tyler Hartung	Jayden Shwaga	Matt Lang		Saskatoon, Saskatchewan
Evan van Amsterdam	Jason Ginter	Sterling Middleton	Parker Konschuh	Darren Moulding	Edmonton, Alberta

=== Knockout Brackets ===
==== A Event ====
First Knockout	Qualifier 1
(Newfoundland and Labrador) Brad Gushue	4
(Saskatchewan) Kelly Knapp	2	(British Columbia) Brent Pierce	5
(British Columbia) Brent Pierce	3	(British Columbia) Brent Pierce	6
(Saskatchewan) Rylan Kleiter	8
(Saskatchewan) Rylan Kleiter	7
(United States) Daniel Casper	6
(Saskatchewan) Rylan Kleiter	6
(Manitoba) Matt Dunstone	7
(Manitoba) Matt Dunstone	5
(United States) Ethan Sampson	4	(Saskatchewan) Drew Heidt	3
(Saskatchewan) Drew Heidt	9	(Manitoba) Matt Dunstone	5
(Manitoba) Reid Carruthers	4
(Manitoba) Reid Carruthers	8
(Nova Scotia) Owen Purcell	4

First Knockout	Qualifier 2
(Alberta) Brad Jacobs	6
(Saskatchewan) Dustin Kalthoff	6	(Saskatchewan) Dustin Kalthoff	0
(Saskatchewan) Team Laycock	5	(Alberta) Brad Jacobs	2
(Ontario) John Epping	11
(Ontario) John Epping	9
(Alberta) Kevin Koe	8
(Ontario) John Epping	5
(Saskatchewan) Mike McEwen	6
(Saskatchewan) Mike McEwen	6
(Alberta) Evan van Amsterdam	8	(Alberta) Evan van Amsterdam	1
(Saskatchewan) Charley Thomas	5	(Saskatchewan) Mike McEwen	8
(United States) Korey Dropkin	3
(United States) Korey Dropkin	7
(Ontario) Sam Mooibroek	2

==== B Event ====
Second Knockout	Qualifier 3
(Saskatchewan) Drew Heidt	2
(Saskatchewan) Kelly Knapp	5	(Saskatchewan) Kelly Knapp	6
(United States) Daniel Casper	4	(Saskatchewan) Kelly Knapp	2
(Newfoundland and Labrador) Brad Gushue	6
(Newfoundland and Labrador) Brad Gushue	9
(United States) Ethan Sampson	9	(United States) Ethan Sampson	6
(Nova Scotia) Owen Purcell	7	(Newfoundland and Labrador) Brad Gushue	2
(Ontario) John Epping	10

Second Knockout	Qualifier 4
(Alberta) Evan van Amsterdam	4
(Saskatchewan) Team Laycock	4	(Alberta) Kevin Koe	8
(Alberta) Kevin Koe	8	(Alberta) Kevin Koe	6
(Saskatchewan) Dustin Kalthoff	4
(Saskatchewan) Dustin Kalthoff	4
(Saskatchewan) Charley Thomas	3	(Ontario) Sam Mooibroek	3
(Ontario) Sam Mooibroek	7	(Alberta) Kevin Koe	5
(Saskatchewan) Rylan Kleiter	7

Second Knockout
(British Columbia) Brent Pierce	9
(Manitoba) Reid Carruthers	5
(Alberta) Brad Jacobs	5
(United States) Korey Dropkin	3

Qualifier 5
(British Columbia) Brent Pierce	1
(Alberta) Brad Jacobs	8

==== C Event ====
Third Knockout	Qualifier 6
(United States) Daniel Casper	8
(United States) Ethan Sampson	5	(United States) Daniel Casper	6
(Nova Scotia) Owen Purcell	7	(Nova Scotia) Owen Purcell	3
(Saskatchewan) Drew Heidt	6	(United States) Daniel Casper	6
(United States) Korey Dropkin	3
(United States) Daniel Casper	6
(Alberta) Kevin Koe	7

Third Knockout		Qualifier 7
(Saskatchewan) Kelly Knapp	8
(Saskatchewan) Dustin Kalthoff	3	(Saskatchewan) Kelly Knapp	5
		(British Columbia) Brent Pierce	6

Third Knockout						Qualifier 8
				(Manitoba) Reid Carruthers	2
(Saskatchewan) Team Laycock	3			(Ontario) Sam Mooibroek	5
(Ontario) Sam Mooibroek	9	(Ontario) Sam Mooibroek	7
(Saskatchewan) Charley Thomas	8	(Saskatchewan) Charley Thomas	2
(Alberta) Evan van Amsterdam	6					(Ontario) Sam Mooibroek	4
						(Newfoundland and Labrador) Brad Gushue	8

=== Knockout Results ===
All draw times are listed in Central Time (UTC−06:00).

==== Draw 5 ====
Friday, December 13, 8:00 am

Sheet 2	1	2	3	4	5	6	7	8	Final
(Saskatchewan) Kelly Knapp 🔨	0	0	0	0	1	0	1	0	2
(British Columbia) Brent Pierce	0	0	0	0	0	2	0	1	3

Sheet 3	1	2	3	4	5	6	7	8	Final
(United States) Ethan Sampson 🔨	2	0	1	0	0	1	0	0	4
(Saskatchewan) Drew Heidt	0	1	0	2	2	0	2	2	9

Sheet 4	1	2	3	4	5	6	7	8	Final
(Saskatchewan) Dustin Kalthoff	0	1	0	2	0	2	0	1	6
(Saskatchewan) Team Laycock 🔨	1	0	1	0	2	0	1	0	5

Sheet 5	1	2	3	4	5	6	7	8	Final
(Alberta) Evan van Amsterdam	0	1	0	1	3	0	0	3	8
(Saskatchewan) Charley Thomas 🔨	3	0	1	0	0	1	0	0	5

Sheet 6	1	2	3	4	5	6	7	8	Final
(Saskatchewan) Rylan Kleiter 🔨	2	0	1	0	2	1	0	1	7
(United States) Daniel Casper	0	2	0	2	0	0	2	0	6

==== Draw 7 ====
Friday, December 13, 2:30 pm

Sheet 2	1	2	3	4	5	6	7	8	Final
(Manitoba) Matt Dunstone 🔨	0	0	2	0	2	1	0	X	5
(Saskatchewan) Drew Heidt	0	0	0	2	0	0	1	X	3

Sheet 3	1	2	3	4	5	6	7	8	Final
(Newfoundland and Labrador) Brad Gushue	0	0	1	0	0	2	1	0	4
(British Columbia) Brent Pierce 🔨	1	1	0	1	1	0	0	1	5

Sheet 4	1	2	3	4	5	6	7	8	Final
(Manitoba) Reid Carruthers 🔨	0	0	2	0	3	0	1	2	8
(Nova Scotia) Owen Purcell	1	0	0	2	0	1	0	0	4

Sheet 5	1	2	3	4	5	6	7	8	9	Final
(Ontario) John Epping	0	2	1	0	2	0	3	0	1	9
(Alberta) Kevin Koe 🔨	3	0	0	2	0	1	0	2	0	8

Sheet 6	1	2	3	4	5	6	7	8	Final
(United States) Korey Dropkin	0	1	1	0	0	0	2	3	7
(Ontario) Sam Mooibroek 🔨	0	0	0	2	0	0	0	0	2

==== Draw 9 ====
Friday, December 13, 9:00 pm

Sheet 2	1	2	3	4	5	6	7	8	Final
(Alberta) Brad Jacobs 🔨	0	2	2	2	X	X	X	X	6
(Saskatchewan) Dustin Kalthoff	0	0	0	0	X	X	X	X	0

Sheet 3	1	2	3	4	5	6	7	8	Final
(Saskatchewan) Mike McEwen	0	0	1	1	2	2	X	X	6
(Alberta) Evan van Amsterdam 🔨	0	1	0	0	0	0	X	X	1

Sheet 4	1	2	3	4	5	6	7	8	9	Final
(Saskatchewan) Kelly Knapp	0	0	0	1	0	2	1	0	1	5
(United States) Daniel Casper 🔨	0	0	2	0	0	0	0	2	0	4

Sheet 5	1	2	3	4	5	6	7	8	9	Final
(United States) Ethan Sampson 🔨	3	0	3	0	0	0	1	0	2	9
(Nova Scotia) Owen Purcell	0	3	0	2	0	0	0	2	0	7

Sheet 6	1	2	3	4	5	6	7	8	Final
(Saskatchewan) Team Laycock 🔨	0	1	0	1	0	2	0	X	4
(Alberta) Kevin Koe	0	0	2	0	1	0	5	X	8

==== Draw 11 ====
Saturday, December 14, 11:15 am

Sheet 2	1	2	3	4	5	6	7	8	Final
(Saskatchewan) Mike McEwen 🔨	1	0	1	0	2	0	4	X	8
(United States) Korey Dropkin	0	1	0	1	0	1	0	X	3

Sheet 3	1	2	3	4	5	6	7	8	Final
(Manitoba) Matt Dunstone 🔨	0	1	0	0	2	0	0	2	5
(Manitoba) Reid Carruthers	0	0	0	2	0	2	0	0	4

Sheet 4	1	2	3	4	5	6	7	8	Final
(Alberta) Brad Jacobs	0	2	0	0	0	X	X	X	2
(Ontario) John Epping 🔨	3	0	0	3	5	X	X	X	11

Sheet 5	1	2	3	4	5	6	7	8	Final
(Saskatchewan) Drew Heidt	0	0	1	0	0	1	X	X	2
(Saskatchewan) Kelly Knapp 🔨	1	3	0	1	1	0	X	X	6

Sheet 6	1	2	3	4	5	6	7	8	Final
(Newfoundland and Labrador) Brad Gushue 🔨	1	2	0	2	0	3	0	1	9
(United States) Ethan Sampson	0	0	2	0	3	0	1	0	6

==== Draw 12 ====
Saturday, December 14, 2:30 pm

Sheet 3	1	2	3	4	5	6	7	8	Final
(Saskatchewan) Charley Thomas	0	2	0	0	0	1	0	X	3
(Ontario) Sam Mooibroek 🔨	2	0	2	1	1	0	1	X	7

Sheet 4	1	2	3	4	5	6	7	8	Final
(British Columbia) Brent Pierce	0	1	1	0	2	0	2	0	6
(Saskatchewan) Rylan Kleiter 🔨	2	0	0	1	0	2	0	3	8

==== Draw 13 ====
Saturday, December 14, 5:45 pm

Sheet 2	1	2	3	4	5	6	7	8	Final
(Alberta) Evan van Amsterdam	0	2	0	0	0	2	0	X	4
(Alberta) Kevin Koe 🔨	2	0	1	1	2	0	2	X	8

Sheet 3	1	2	3	4	5	6	7	8	Final
(United States) Daniel Casper	0	3	0	0	3	1	0	1	8
(United States) Ethan Sampson 🔨	2	0	0	2	0	0	1	0	5

Sheet 4	1	2	3	4	5	6	7	8	Final
(Saskatchewan) Kelly Knapp	0	0	1	0	0	1	X	X	2
(Newfoundland and Labrador) Brad Gushue 🔨	0	2	0	3	1	0	X	X	6

Sheet 5	1	2	3	4	5	6	7	8	Final
(Saskatchewan) Dustin Kalthoff 🔨	1	0	0	1	0	1	0	1	4
(Ontario) Sam Mooibroek	0	1	0	0	1	0	1	0	3

Sheet 6	1	2	3	4	5	6	7	8	Final
(Nova Scotia) Owen Purcell	0	1	1	1	1	1	0	2	7
(Saskatchewan) Drew Heidt 🔨	3	0	0	0	0	0	3	0	6

==== Draw 14 ====
Saturday, December 14, 9:00 pm

Sheet 2	1	2	3	4	5	6	7	8	Final
(Saskatchewan) Team Laycock 🔨	0	0	2	0	1	0	X	X	3
(Ontario) Sam Mooibroek	1	1	0	3	0	4	X	X	9

Sheet 6	1	2	3	4	5	6	7	8	Final
(Saskatchewan) Charley Thomas	0	0	0	3	3	0	2	X	8
(Alberta) Evan van Amsterdam 🔨	0	2	0	0	0	4	0	X	6

==== Draw 15 ====
Sunday, December 15, 8:00 am

Sheet 2	1	2	3	4	5	6	7	8	Final
(United States) Daniel Casper 🔨	0	2	0	2	0	1	1	X	6
(Nova Scotia) Owen Purcell	0	0	2	0	1	0	0	X	3

Sheet 3	1	2	3	4	5	6	7	8	9	Final
(Ontario) John Epping	0	2	0	0	1	0	0	2	0	5
(Saskatchewan) Mike McEwen 🔨	1	0	0	1	0	2	1	0	1	6

Sheet 4	1	2	3	4	5	6	7	8	Final
(Alberta) Kevin Koe 🔨	2	0	0	0	2	1	1	X	6
(Saskatchewan) Dustin Kalthoff	0	2	1	1	0	0	0	X	4

Sheet 5	1	2	3	4	5	6	7	8	Final
(Alberta) Brad Jacobs	0	0	0	0	4	0	0	1	5
(United States) Korey Dropkin 🔨	0	1	0	0	0	1	1	0	3

Sheet 6	1	2	3	4	5	6	7	8	Final
(British Columbia) Brent Pierce 🔨	2	0	4	0	2	1	X	X	9
(Manitoba) Reid Carruthers	0	3	0	2	0	0	X	X	5

==== Draw 16 ====
Sunday, December 15, 11:15 am

Sheet 2	1	2	3	4	5	6	7	8	Final
(Saskatchewan) Rylan Kleiter	0	1	0	2	1	0	2	0	6
(Manitoba) Matt Dunstone 🔨	3	0	2	0	0	1	0	1	7

==== Draw 17 ====
Sunday, December 15, 2:30 pm

Sheet 3	1	2	3	4	5	6	7	8	Final
(British Columbia) Brent Pierce	0	0	1	0	X	X	X	X	1
(Alberta) Brad Jacobs 🔨	3	2	0	3	X	X	X	X	8

Sheet 4	1	2	3	4	5	6	7	8	Final
(Ontario) Sam Mooibroek	1	1	0	2	0	2	1	X	7
(Saskatchewan) Charley Thomas 🔨	0	0	1	0	1	0	0	X	2

Sheet 5	1	2	3	4	5	6	7	8	Final
(Newfoundland and Labrador) Brad Gushue 🔨	0	0	1	0	1	0	0	X	2
(Ontario) John Epping	1	1	0	1	0	2	5	X	10

Sheet 6	1	2	3	4	5	6	7	8	Final
(Alberta) Kevin Koe	1	0	2	0	2	0	0	X	5
(Saskatchewan) Rylan Kleiter 🔨	0	1	0	3	0	2	1	X	7

==== Draw 18 ====
Sunday, December 15, 5:45 pm

Sheet 2	1	2	3	4	5	6	7	8	Final
(Saskatchewan) Kelly Knapp 🔨	1	2	0	2	0	2	1	X	8
(Saskatchewan) Dustin Kalthoff	0	0	2	0	1	0	0	X	3

Sheet 3	1	2	3	4	5	6	7	8	Final
(United States) Daniel Casper 🔨	0	2	0	0	1	1	0	2	6
(United States) Korey Dropkin	0	0	1	0	0	0	2	0	3

Sheet 5	1	2	3	4	5	6	7	8	Final
(Manitoba) Reid Carruthers	0	0	1	0	1	0	0	X	2
(Ontario) Sam Mooibroek 🔨	0	1	0	1	0	3	0	X	5

==== Draw 19 ====
Sunday, December 15, 9:00 pm

Sheet 4	1	2	3	4	5	6	7	8	9	Final
(Saskatchewan) Kelly Knapp	0	0	1	0	2	0	1	1	0	5
(British Columbia) Brent Pierce 🔨	0	1	0	2	0	2	0	0	1	6

Sheet 5	1	2	3	4	5	6	7	8	Final
(United States) Daniel Casper 🔨	2	0	2	0	0	1	1	0	6
(Alberta) Kevin Koe	0	3	0	2	1	0	0	1	7

Sheet 6	1	2	3	4	5	6	7	8	Final
(Ontario) Sam Mooibroek	0	2	2	0	0	0	X	X	4
(Newfoundland and Labrador) Brad Gushue 🔨	4	0	0	1	1	2	X	X	8

=== Playoffs ===
Quarterfinals
1	(Manitoba) Matt Dunstone	7
8	(Newfoundland and Labrador) Brad Gushue	3
4	(Saskatchewan) Rylan Kleiter	3
5	(Alberta) Brad Jacobs	9
2	(Saskatchewan) Mike McEwen	5
7	(British Columbia) Brent Pierce	6
3	(Ontario) John Epping	3
6	(Alberta) Kevin Koe	6

Semifinals
1	(Manitoba) Matt Dunstone	5
5	(Alberta) Brad Jacobs	6
7	(British Columbia) Brent Pierce	2
6	(Alberta) Kevin Koe	3

Final
5	(Alberta) Brad Jacobs	6
6	(Alberta) Kevin Koe	7

==== Quarterfinals ====
Monday, December 16, 9:00 am

Sheet 2	1	2	3	4	5	6	7	8	Final
(Saskatchewan) Rylan Kleiter	0	2	0	0	1	0	0	X	3
(Alberta) Brad Jacobs 🔨	2	0	0	3	0	2	2	X	9

Sheet 3	1	2	3	4	5	6	7	8	Final
(Manitoba) Matt Dunstone 🔨	2	0	1	0	0	4	X	X	7
(Newfoundland and Labrador) Brad Gushue	0	1	0	2	0	0	X	X	3

Sheet 4	1	2	3	4	5	6	7	8	9	Final
(Ontario) John Epping 🔨	0	2	0	0	0	1	0	0	0	3
(Alberta) Kevin Koe	0	0	0	2	0	0	0	1	3	6

Sheet 5	1	2	3	4	5	6	7	8	Final
(Saskatchewan) Mike McEwen 🔨	0	0	1	0	2	0	2	0	5
(British Columbia) Brent Pierce	0	2	0	1	0	1	0	2	6

==== Semifinals ====
Monday, December 16, 12:30 pm

Sheet 2	1	2	3	4	5	6	7	8	Final
(British Columbia) Brent Pierce	0	0	1	0	0	1	0	X	2
(Alberta) Kevin Koe 🔨	0	1	0	0	2	0	0	X	3

Sheet 4	1	2	3	4	5	6	7	8	9	Final
(Manitoba) Matt Dunstone 🔨	2	0	0	1	0	0	0	2	0	5
(Alberta) Brad Jacobs	0	2	1	0	0	0	2	0	1	6

==== Final ====
Monday, December 16, 4:00 pm

Sheet 3	1	2	3	4	5	6	7	8	Final
(Alberta) Brad Jacobs 🔨	2	0	1	0	0	2	1	0	6
(Alberta) Kevin Koe	0	2	0	0	4	0	0	1	7

== Women ==
=== Teams ===
The teams are listed as follows:

Skip	Third	Second	Lead	Alternate	Locale
Corryn Brown	Erin Pincott	Sarah Koltun	Samantha Fisher		Kamloops, British Columbia
Kate Cameron	Taylor McDonald	Brianna Cullen	Mackenzie Elias		St. Adolphe, Manitoba
Jolene Campbell	Rachel Erickson	Abby Ackland	Dayna Demmans		Regina, Saskatchewan
Chelsea Carey	Karlee Burgess	Emily Zacharias	Lauren Lenentine		Winnipeg, Manitoba
Kerri Einarson	Val Sweeting	Shannon Birchard	Krysten Karwacki		Gimli, Manitoba
Jenna Enge	Brett Barber	Christie Gamble	Amélie Blais	Raechel Schlechter	Regina, Saskatchewan
Stephanie Schmidt (Fourth)	Sara Miller	Ashley Williamson	Michelle Englot (Skip)		Regina, Saskatchewan
Satsuki Fujisawa	Chinami Yoshida	Yumi Suzuki	Yurika Yoshida		Kitami, Japan
Serena Gray-Withers	Catherine Clifford	Lindsey Burgess	Zoe Cinnamon		Edmonton, Alberta
Danielle Inglis	Kira Brunton	Calissa Daly	Cassandra de Groot		Ottawa, Ontario
Kaitlyn Lawes	Selena Njegovan	Jocelyn Peterman	Kristin Gordon	Becca Hebert	Winnipeg, Manitoba
Kayla MacMillan	Sarah Daniels	Lindsay Dubue	Sarah Loken		Victoria, British Columbia
Sherrilee Orsted	Candace Newkirk	Shalon Fleming	Jasmine Kerr		Moose Jaw, Saskatchewan
Xenia Schwaller	Selina Gafner	Fabienne Rieder	Selina Rychiger		Zurich, Switzerland
Kayla Skrlik	Margot Flemming	Ashton Skrlik	Geri-Lynn Ramsay		Calgary, Alberta
Delaney Strouse	Sarah Anderson	Sydney Mullaney	Anne O'Hara		(United States) Traverse City, Michigan
Ashley Thevenot	Brittany Tran	Taylor Stremick	Kaylin Skinner		Saskatoon, Saskatchewan

=== Knockout Brackets ===
==== A Event ====
First Knockout	Qualifier 1
(Manitoba) Kerri Einarson	9
(Saskatchewan) Michelle Englot	6	(Saskatchewan) Michelle Englot	10
(Saskatchewan) Sherrilee Orsted	5	(Saskatchewan) Michelle Englot	0
(United States) Delaney Strouse	7
(United States) Delaney Strouse	7
(British Columbia) Corryn Brown	3
(United States) Delaney Strouse	2
(Switzerland) Xenia Schwaller	7
(Switzerland) Xenia Schwaller	7
(Alberta) Serena Gray-Withers	2
(Switzerland) Xenia Schwaller	7
(Ontario) Danielle Inglis	1
(Manitoba) Chelsea Carey	7
(Ontario) Danielle Inglis	10

First Knockout	Qualifier 2
(Japan) Satsuki Fujisawa	7
(Saskatchewan) Jenna Enge	3
(Japan) Satsuki Fujisawa	2
(British Columbia) Kayla MacMillan	5
(Manitoba) Kate Cameron	2
(British Columbia) Kayla MacMillan	7
(British Columbia) Kayla MacMillan	5
(Alberta) Kayla Skrlik	6
(Manitoba) Kaitlyn Lawes	9
(Saskatchewan) Jolene Campbell	2
(Manitoba) Kaitlyn Lawes	4
(Alberta) Kayla Skrlik	6
(Alberta) Kayla Skrlik	8
(Saskatchewan) Ashley Thevenot	4

==== B Event ====
Second Knockout	Qualifier 3
(Alberta) Serena Gray-Withers	3
(Saskatchewan) Sherrilee Orsted	6	(British Columbia) Corryn Brown	8
(British Columbia) Corryn Brown	7	(British Columbia) Corryn Brown	7
(Manitoba) Chelsea Carey	2
(Manitoba) Kerri Einarson	4
(Manitoba) Chelsea Carey	8
(British Columbia) Corryn Brown	7
(British Columbia) Kayla MacMillan	6

Second Knockout				Qualifier 4
(Manitoba) Kate Cameron	11
(Saskatchewan) Jolene Campbell	8	(Manitoba) Kate Cameron	7
(Saskatchewan) Jenna Enge	5	(Saskatchewan) Ashley Thevenot	2
(Saskatchewan) Ashley Thevenot	9			(Manitoba) Kate Cameron	6
				(United States) Delaney Strouse	1

Second Knockout
(Saskatchewan) Michelle Englot	8
(Ontario) Danielle Inglis	5
(Japan) Satsuki Fujisawa	4
(Manitoba) Kaitlyn Lawes	2

Qualifier 5
(Saskatchewan) Michelle Englot	2
(Japan) Satsuki Fujisawa	5

==== C Event ====
Third Knockout	Qualifier 6
(Saskatchewan) Sherrilee Orsted	1
(Manitoba) Kerri Einarson	8	(Manitoba) Kerri Einarson	6
(Alberta) Serena Gray-Withers	5
(Manitoba) Kerri Einarson	3
(Manitoba) Kaitlyn Lawes	8
(Manitoba) Kaitlyn Lawes	5
(United States) Delaney Strouse	11

Third Knockout		Qualifier 7
(Manitoba) Chelsea Carey	3
(Saskatchewan) Ashley Thevenot	6	(Saskatchewan) Ashley Thevenot	3
		(Saskatchewan) Michelle Englot	9

Third Knockout				Qualifier 8
		(Ontario) Danielle Inglis	8
(Saskatchewan) Jolene Campbell	5	(Saskatchewan) Jolene Campbell	3
(Saskatchewan) Jenna Enge	1			(Ontario) Danielle Inglis	2
				(British Columbia) Kayla MacMillan	7

=== Knockout Results ===
All draw times are listed in Central Time (UTC−06:00).

==== Draw 1 ====
Thursday, December 12, 9:00 am

Sheet 2	1	2	3	4	5	6	7	8	Final
(Saskatchewan) Michelle Englot 🔨	1	2	0	2	0	0	0	1	6
(Saskatchewan) Sherrilee Orsted	0	0	2	0	0	2	1	0	5

Sheet 3	1	2	3	4	5	6	7	8	Final
(Switzerland) Xenia Schwaller	2	0	1	0	1	1	2	X	7
(Alberta) Serena Gray-Withers 🔨	0	1	0	1	0	0	0	X	2

Sheet 4	1	2	3	4	5	6	7	8	Final
(Manitoba) Chelsea Carey	0	2	0	0	4	0	1	X	7
(Ontario) Danielle Inglis 🔨	1	0	4	2	0	3	0	X	10

Sheet 5	1	2	3	4	5	6	7	8	Final
(Manitoba) Kaitlyn Lawes 🔨	2	0	1	4	2	X	X	X	9
(Saskatchewan) Jolene Campbell	0	2	0	0	0	X	X	X	2

==== Draw 2 ====
Thursday, December 12, 12:30 pm

Sheet 2	1	2	3	4	5	6	7	8	Final
(United States) Delaney Strouse 🔨	0	1	1	0	2	1	0	2	7
(British Columbia) Corryn Brown	0	0	0	2	0	0	1	0	3

Sheet 3	1	2	3	4	5	6	7	8	9	Final
(Manitoba) Kerri Einarson	2	0	0	3	0	1	0	3	0	9
(Saskatchewan) Michelle Englot 🔨	0	3	1	0	2	0	3	0	1	10

Sheet 5	1	2	3	4	5	6	7	8	Final
(Manitoba) Kate Cameron	0	0	2	0	0	0	X	X	2
(British Columbia) Kayla MacMillan 🔨	1	1	0	1	1	3	X	X	7

Sheet 6	1	2	3	4	5	6	7	8	Final
(Alberta) Kayla Skrlik	0	0	4	1	2	0	1	X	8
(Saskatchewan) Ashley Thevenot 🔨	1	1	0	0	0	2	0	X	4

==== Draw 3 ====
Thursday, December 12, 4:00 pm

Sheet 2	1	2	3	4	5	6	7	8	Final
(Switzerland) Xenia Schwaller 🔨	0	1	0	2	3	1	X	X	7
(Ontario) Danielle Inglis	0	0	1	0	0	0	X	X	1

Sheet 4	1	2	3	4	5	6	7	8	Final
(Manitoba) Kaitlyn Lawes	0	0	0	1	0	0	3	0	4
(Alberta) Kayla Skrlik 🔨	0	2	1	0	0	2	0	1	6

Sheet 5	1	2	3	4	5	6	7	8	9	Final
(Saskatchewan) Sherrilee Orsted 🔨	4	0	0	1	0	0	1	0	0	6
(British Columbia) Corryn Brown	0	1	1	0	1	2	0	1	1	7

Sheet 6	1	2	3	4	5	6	7	8	Final
(Japan) Satsuki Fujisawa	1	3	0	1	0	1	1	X	7
(Saskatchewan) Jenna Enge 🔨	0	0	1	0	2	0	0	X	3

==== Draw 4 ====
Thursday, December 12, 8:30 pm

Sheet 2	1	2	3	4	5	6	7	8	Final
(Saskatchewan) Jenna Enge	2	0	1	0	0	2	0	X	5
(Saskatchewan) Ashley Thevenot 🔨	0	3	0	1	3	0	2	X	9

Sheet 3	1	2	3	4	5	6	7	8	Final
(Japan) Satsuki Fujisawa	1	0	0	0	1	0	0	0	2
(British Columbia) Kayla MacMillan 🔨	0	0	1	0	0	1	2	1	5

Sheet 5	1	2	3	4	5	6	7	8	Final
(Saskatchewan) Michelle Englot	0	0	0	0	0	X	X	X	0
(United States) Delaney Strouse 🔨	0	0	3	1	3	X	X	X	7

Sheet 6	1	2	3	4	5	6	7	8	Final
(Manitoba) Kerri Einarson 🔨	0	1	0	0	0	3	0	X	4
(Manitoba) Chelsea Carey	1	0	2	1	2	0	2	X	8

==== Draw 6 ====
Friday, December 13, 11:15 am

Sheet 2	1	2	3	4	5	6	7	8	9	Final
(Manitoba) Kate Cameron 🔨	2	0	3	0	1	2	0	0	3	11
(Saskatchewan) Jolene Campbell	0	2	0	1	0	0	4	1	0	8

Sheet 3	1	2	3	4	5	6	7	8	Final
(United States) Delaney Strouse	0	1	0	0	0	1	X	X	2
(Switzerland) Xenia Schwaller 🔨	2	0	0	2	3	0	X	X	7

Sheet 4	1	2	3	4	5	6	7	8	Final
(Alberta) Serena Gray-Withers	0	0	1	0	2	0	X	X	3
(British Columbia) Corryn Brown 🔨	1	0	0	3	0	4	X	X	8

Sheet 5	1	2	3	4	5	6	7	8	Final
(British Columbia) Kayla MacMillan 🔨	0	2	0	1	1	1	0	0	5
(Alberta) Kayla Skrlik	1	0	3	0	0	0	1	1	6

Sheet 6	1	2	3	4	5	6	7	8	Final
(Saskatchewan) Michelle Englot 🔨	0	2	2	0	2	0	2	X	8
(Ontario) Danielle Inglis	1	0	0	2	0	2	0	X	5

==== Draw 8 ====
Friday, December 13, 5:45 pm

Sheet 2	1	2	3	4	5	6	7	8	Final
(Saskatchewan) Sherrilee Orsted	0	0	0	0	1	X	X	X	1
(Manitoba) Kerri Einarson 🔨	0	4	3	1	0	X	X	X	8

Sheet 3	1	2	3	4	5	6	7	8	Final
(British Columbia) Corryn Brown 🔨	2	1	2	0	2	0	X	X	7
(Manitoba) Chelsea Carey	0	0	0	1	0	1	X	X	2

Sheet 4	1	2	3	4	5	6	7	8	Final
(Manitoba) Kate Cameron 🔨	0	3	0	0	1	2	1	X	7
(Saskatchewan) Ashley Thevenot	1	0	1	0	0	0	0	X	2

Sheet 5	1	2	3	4	5	6	7	8	Final
(Japan) Satsuki Fujisawa	1	0	0	1	0	0	1	1	4
(Manitoba) Kaitlyn Lawes 🔨	0	1	0	0	0	1	0	0	2

==== Draw 10 ====
Saturday, December 14, 8:00 am

Sheet 2	1	2	3	4	5	6	7	8	Final
(British Columbia) Corryn Brown	0	1	0	0	3	1	0	2	7
(British Columbia) Kayla MacMillan 🔨	2	0	0	2	0	0	2	0	6

Sheet 3	1	2	3	4	5	6	7	8	Final
(Saskatchewan) Jolene Campbell	0	0	2	1	0	1	1	X	5
(Saskatchewan) Jenna Enge 🔨	1	0	0	0	0	0	0	X	1

Sheet 4	1	2	3	4	5	6	7	8	Final
(Saskatchewan) Michelle Englot 🔨	0	1	0	0	0	1	0	X	2
(Japan) Satsuki Fujisawa	0	0	0	2	2	0	1	X	5

Sheet 5	1	2	3	4	5	6	7	8	Final
(Manitoba) Kate Cameron 🔨	2	0	0	2	1	1	X	X	6
(United States) Delaney Strouse	0	1	0	0	0	0	X	X	1

Sheet 6	1	2	3	4	5	6	7	8	Final
(Manitoba) Kerri Einarson 🔨	0	1	0	2	0	1	0	2	6
(Alberta) Serena Gray-Withers	0	0	2	0	1	0	2	0	5

==== Draw 12 ====
Saturday, December 14, 2:30 pm

Sheet 2	1	2	3	4	5	6	7	8	Final
(Manitoba) Kerri Einarson 🔨	0	1	1	0	1	0	X	X	3
(Manitoba) Kaitlyn Lawes	2	0	0	2	0	4	X	X	8

Sheet 5	1	2	3	4	5	6	7	8	Final
(Ontario) Danielle Inglis	0	2	0	1	0	3	2	X	8
(Saskatchewan) Jolene Campbell 🔨	1	0	1	0	1	0	0	X	3

Sheet 6	1	2	3	4	5	6	7	8	Final
(Manitoba) Chelsea Carey	1	0	0	1	0	1	0	0	3
(Saskatchewan) Ashley Thevenot 🔨	0	2	1	0	1	0	1	1	6

==== Draw 14 ====
Saturday, December 14, 9:00 pm

Sheet 3	1	2	3	4	5	6	7	8	Final
(Ontario) Danielle Inglis	0	0	2	0	0	0	X	X	2
(British Columbia) Kayla MacMillan 🔨	0	2	0	3	1	1	X	X	7

Sheet 4	1	2	3	4	5	6	7	8	Final
(Manitoba) Kaitlyn Lawes	0	0	2	0	2	1	0	X	5
(United States) Delaney Strouse 🔨	2	3	0	1	0	0	5	X	11

Sheet 5	1	2	3	4	5	6	7	8	Final
(Saskatchewan) Ashley Thevenot	0	1	0	1	0	1	0	X	3
(Saskatchewan) Michelle Englot 🔨	1	0	4	0	1	0	3	X	9

=== Playoffs ===
Quarterfinals
1	(Switzerland) Xenia Schwaller	7
8	(British Columbia) Kayla MacMillan	3
4	(Manitoba) Kate Cameron	5
5	(Japan) Satsuki Fujisawa	6
2	(Alberta) Kayla Skrlik	5
7	(Saskatchewan) Michelle Englot	8
3	(British Columbia) Corryn Brown	5
6	(United States) Delaney Strouse	7

Semifinals
1	(Switzerland) Xenia Schwaller	4
5	(Japan) Satsuki Fujisawa	3
7	(Saskatchewan) Michelle Englot	7
6	(United States) Delaney Strouse	6

Final
1	(Switzerland) Xenia Schwaller	7
7	(Saskatchewan) Michelle Englot	6

==== Quarterfinals ====
Sunday, December 15, 11:15 am

Sheet 3	1	2	3	4	5	6	7	8	Final
(Manitoba) Kate Cameron 🔨	2	0	0	0	1	0	0	2	5
(Japan) Satsuki Fujisawa	0	1	2	1	0	1	1	0	6

Sheet 4	1	2	3	4	5	6	7	8	Final
(Switzerland) Xenia Schwaller 🔨	0	0	0	0	3	0	2	2	7
(British Columbia) Kayla MacMillan	1	0	1	0	0	1	0	0	3

Sheet 5	1	2	3	4	5	6	7	8	Final
(British Columbia) Corryn Brown 🔨	1	0	2	0	0	2	0	X	5
(United States) Delaney Strouse	0	2	0	0	2	0	3	X	7

Sheet 6	1	2	3	4	5	6	7	8	Final
(Alberta) Kayla Skrlik 🔨	1	0	2	0	0	2	0	X	5
(Saskatchewan) Michelle Englot	0	3	0	2	1	0	2	X	8

==== Semifinals ====
Sunday, December 15, 5:45 pm

Sheet 4	1	2	3	4	5	6	7	8	9	Final
(Saskatchewan) Michelle Englot 🔨	2	0	1	0	0	1	0	2	1	7
(United States) Delaney Strouse	0	1	0	0	2	0	3	0	0	6

Sheet 6	1	2	3	4	5	6	7	8	Final
(Switzerland) Xenia Schwaller 🔨	1	0	0	0	0	0	2	1	4
(Japan) Satsuki Fujisawa	0	0	0	1	1	1	0	0	3

==== Final ====
Sunday, December 15, 9:00 pm

Sheet 2	1	2	3	4	5	6	7	8	9	Final
(Switzerland) Xenia Schwaller 🔨	0	0	1	0	3	0	0	2	1	7
(Saskatchewan) Michelle Englot	1	1	0	1	0	2	1	0	0	6
