= 2023 Western Showdown =

2023 Nutrien Ag Solutions Western Showdown
- Host city: Swift Current, Saskatchewan
- Arena: Swift Current Curling Club
- Dates: December 6–10
- Men's winner: (Switzerland) Team Schwaller
- Curling club: CC Genève, Geneva
- Skip: Yannick Schwaller
- Fourth: Benoît Schwarz-van Berkel
- Second: Sven Michel
- Lead: Pablo Lachat
- Coach: Håvard Vad Petersson
- Finalist: (Switzerland) Michael Brunner
- Women's winner: (South Korea) Team Kim
- Curling club: Gangneung CC, Gangneung
- Skip: Kim Eun-jung
- Third: Kim Kyeong-ae
- Second: Kim Cho-hi
- Lead: Kim Seon-yeong
- Alternate: Kim Yeong-mi
- Coach: Lim Myung-sup
- Finalist: (Manitoba) Jolene Campbell

The 2023 Nutrien Ag Solutions Western Showdown was held from December 6 to 10 at the Swift Current Curling Club in Swift Current, Saskatchewan. The total purse for the event was $50,000 on the men's and women's sides.

The event was sponsored by Curling Stadium, a streaming service provided by CurlingZone. All of the games were streamed on CurlingZone and the Swift Current Curling Club's YouTube page.

In the men's final, Yannick Schwaller and his team from Geneva defeated Michael Brunner of Bern 8–6 in an all-Swiss championship game. Trailing by one at the half, Schwaller counted a four spot in the fifth end that allowed his team of Benoît Schwarz-van Berkel, Sven Michel and Pablo Lachat to control the rest of the match. Both Swiss contingents qualified through the C side of the draw before sweeping the playoff round. Schwaller defeated A qualifier Sam Mooibroek 9–6 in the quarterfinals and then beat the United States' Korey Dropkin 5–4 in the semifinals. For Brunner, they took down the number one qualifier Catlin Schneider 5–3 in the quarters before eliminating Mike McEwen 5–4 in the semis as well. Niklas Edin and Steve Laycock rounded out the men's playoff draw.

In the women's final, South Korea's Kim Eun-jung took two in the seventh end and stole a single in the eighth to clip Winnipeg's Jolene Campbell 6–4 in a battle of previously undefeated teams. Kim's Gangneung based squad of Kim Kyeong-ae, Kim Cho-hi, Kim Seon-yeong and Kim Yeong-mi qualified for the playoffs as the number one seeds. They then beat Korean rivals Gim Eun-ji 7–3 in the quarterfinals before knocking off Isabella Wranå 11–6 in the semifinals. Team Campbell finished third through the preliminary round with playoff victories over Kayla Skrlik 7–2 and Satsuki Fujisawa 8–2. Silvana Tirinzoni, Corrie Hürlimann, Xenia Schwaller and Amber Holland all advanced to the playoffs before losing in the quarterfinals and qualification round respectively.

Many international teams competed in the event as it was held the weekend before the 2023 Masters Grand Slam event in Saskatoon.

== Men ==
=== Teams ===
The teams are listed as follows:

Skip	Third	Second	Lead	Alternate	Locale
Trevor Bonot	Mike McCarville	Jordan Potts	Kurtis Byrd		Thunder Bay, Ontario
Michael Brunner	Anthony Petoud	Romano Meier	Andreas Gerlach		Bern, Switzerland
Braden Calvert	Corey Chambers	Kyle Kurz	Brendan Bilawka		Winnipeg, Manitoba
Carl deConinck Smith	Ryan Deis	Kurt Dixon	Kalin Deis		Fox Valley, Saskatchewan
Korey Dropkin (Fourth)	Andrew Stopera (Skip)	Mark Fenner	Thomas Howell		(United States) Duluth, Minnesota
Niklas Edin	Oskar Eriksson	Rasmus Wranå	Christoffer Sundgren		Karlstad, Sweden
Marco Hösli	Philipp Hösli	Simon Gloor	Justin Hausherr		Glarus, Switzerland
Rylan Kleiter	Joshua Mattern	Matthew Hall	Trevor Johnson		Saskatoon, Saskatchewan
Kevin Koe	Tyler Tardi	Jacques Gauthier	Karrick Martin		Calgary, Alberta
Steve Laycock	Shaun Meachem	Chris Haichert	Brayden Grindheim		Saskatoon, Saskatchewan
Mike McEwen	Colton Flasch	Kevin Marsh	Dan Marsh		Saskatoon, Saskatchewan
Sam Mooibroek	Scott Mitchell	Nathan Steele	Colin Schnurr	Wyatt Small	Whitby, Ontario
Park Jong-duk	Jeong Yeong-seok	Oh Seung-hoon	Seong Ji-hoon	Lee Ki-bok	Gangwon, South Korea
Catlin Schneider	Sterling Middleton	Jason Ginter	Alex Horvath		Victoria, British Columbia
Benoît Schwarz-van Berkel (Fourth)	Yannick Schwaller (Skip)	Sven Michel	Pablo Lachat		Geneva, Switzerland
Karsten Sturmay	Kyle Doering	Glenn Venance	Kurtis Goller	J. D. Lind	St. Albert, Alberta
Ryan Wiebe	Ty Dilello	Sean Flatt	Adam Flatt		Winnipeg, Manitoba
Riku Yanagisawa	Tsuyoshi Yamaguchi	– (Note: Team Yanagisawa played with three players.)	Satoshi Koizumi		Karuizawa, Japan

=== Knockout Brackets ===
==== A Event ====
First Knockout	Qualifier 1
(Sweden) Niklas Edin	5
(Saskatchewan) Steve Laycock	6	(Saskatchewan) Steve Laycock	2
(Ontario) Trevor Bonot	3	(Sweden) Niklas Edin	6
(Japan) Riku Yanagisawa	5
(Switzerland) Marco Hösli	2
(Japan) Riku Yanagisawa	6
(Sweden) Niklas Edin	4
(British Columbia) Catlin Schneider	7
(United States) Team Dropkin	4
(British Columbia) Catlin Schneider	7
(British Columbia) Catlin Schneider	6
(Saskatchewan) Mike McEwen	2
(Saskatchewan) Mike McEwen	7
(South Korea) Park Jong-duk	5

First Knockout	Qualifier 2
(Switzerland) Yannick Schwaller	5
(Manitoba) Braden Calvert	5	(Manitoba) Braden Calvert	3
(Saskatchewan) Carl deConinck Smith	1	(Switzerland) Yannick Schwaller	2
(Ontario) Sam Mooibroek	7
(Alberta) Karsten Sturmay	3
(Ontario) Sam Mooibroek	8
(Ontario) Sam Mooibroek	6
(Switzerland) Michael Brunner	5
(Alberta) Kevin Koe	6
(Saskatchewan) Rylan Kleiter	3
(Alberta) Kevin Koe	5
(Switzerland) Michael Brunner	6
(Switzerland) Michael Brunner	7
(Manitoba) Ryan Wiebe	3

==== B Event ====
Second Knockout	Qualifier 3
(Switzerland) Marco Hösli	9
(Ontario) Trevor Bonot	0	(United States) Team Dropkin	5
(United States) Team Dropkin	8	(Switzerland) Marco Hösli	4
(Saskatchewan) Steve Laycock	9
(Saskatchewan) Steve Laycock	7
(South Korea) Park Jong-duk	4
(Saskatchewan) Steve Laycock	9
(Switzerland) Michael Brunner	8

Second Knockout	Qualifier 4
(Alberta) Karsten Sturmay	5
(Saskatchewan) Carl deConinck Smith	4	(Saskatchewan) Rylan Kleiter	7
(Saskatchewan) Rylan Kleiter	7	(Saskatchewan) Rylan Kleiter	5
(Manitoba) Ryan Wiebe	8
(Manitoba) Braden Calvert	2
(Manitoba) Ryan Wiebe	8
(Manitoba) Ryan Wiebe	3
(Sweden) Niklas Edin	8

Second Knockout		Qualifier 5
(Japan) Riku Yanagisawa	5
(Saskatchewan) Mike McEwen	7	(Saskatchewan) Mike McEwen	10
(Switzerland) Yannick Schwaller	8	(Switzerland) Yannick Schwaller	6
(Alberta) Kevin Koe	4

==== C Event ====
Third Knockout	Qualifier 6
(United States) Team Dropkin	8
(Ontario) Trevor Bonot	8	(Ontario) Trevor Bonot	2
(South Korea) Park Jong-duk	5	(United States) Team Dropkin	5
(Alberta) Kevin Koe	4
(United States) Team Dropkin	6
(Manitoba) Ryan Wiebe	3

Third Knockout		Qualifier 7
(Switzerland) Marco Hösli	2
(Saskatchewan) Rylan Kleiter	9	(Saskatchewan) Rylan Kleiter	2
		(Switzerland) Yannick Schwaller	7

Third Knockout						Qualifier 8
				(Japan) Riku Yanagisawa	5
(Saskatchewan) Carl deConinck Smith	5			(Alberta) Karsten Sturmay	6
(Manitoba) Braden Calvert	8	(Manitoba) Braden Calvert	4
		(Alberta) Karsten Sturmay	5
						(Alberta) Karsten Sturmay	3
						(Switzerland) Michael Brunner	8

=== Knockout Results ===
All draw times are listed in Central Time (UTC−06:00).

==== Draw 2 ====
Thursday, December 7, 8:00 am

Sheet 2	1	2	3	4	5	6	7	8	Final
(Saskatchewan) Steve Laycock 🔨	1	0	2	2	0	1	0	X	6
(Ontario) Trevor Bonot	0	1	0	0	1	0	1	X	3

Sheet 4	1	2	3	4	5	6	7	8	Final
(Manitoba) Braden Calvert 🔨	0	0	0	1	1	0	3	X	5
(Saskatchewan) Carl deConinck Smith	0	0	0	0	0	1	0	X	1

Sheet 5	1	2	3	4	5	6	7	8	9	Final
(United States) Team Dropkin	0	1	0	1	0	0	0	2	0	4
(British Columbia) Catlin Schneider 🔨	1	0	1	0	0	1	1	0	3	7

==== Draw 3 ====
Thursday, December 7, 11:15 am

Sheet 6	1	2	3	4	5	6	7	8	Final
(Alberta) Kevin Koe 🔨	0	1	0	3	2	0	X	X	6
(Saskatchewan) Rylan Kleiter	0	0	2	0	0	1	X	X	3

==== Draw 4 ====
Thursday, December 7, 2:30 pm

Sheet 1	1	2	3	4	5	6	7	8	Final
(Sweden) Niklas Edin 🔨	0	1	1	0	2	1	X	X	5
(Saskatchewan) Steve Laycock	1	0	0	1	0	0	X	X	2

Sheet 2	1	2	3	4	5	6	7	8	Final
(Switzerland) Marco Hösli	0	0	0	1	0	1	0	X	2
(Japan) Riku Yanagisawa 🔨	1	0	1	0	3	0	1	X	6

Sheet 3	1	2	3	4	5	6	7	8	Final
(Saskatchewan) Mike McEwen	0	0	3	0	0	3	0	1	7
(South Korea) Park Jong-duk 🔨	1	1	0	2	1	0	0	0	5

Sheet 4	1	2	3	4	5	6	7	8	Final
(Alberta) Karsten Sturmay 🔨	0	2	1	0	0	0	0	X	3
(Ontario) Sam Mooibroek	2	0	0	1	2	1	2	X	8

Sheet 5	1	2	3	4	5	6	7	8	Final
(Switzerland) Yannick Schwaller 🔨	0	2	0	2	0	1	0	X	5
(Manitoba) Braden Calvert	0	0	1	0	1	0	1	X	3

Sheet 6	1	2	3	4	5	6	7	8	Final
(Switzerland) Michael Brunner 🔨	1	1	2	0	2	0	1	X	7
(Manitoba) Ryan Wiebe	0	0	0	2	0	1	0	X	3

==== Draw 5 ====
Thursday, December 7, 5:45 pm

Sheet 1	1	2	3	4	5	6	7	8	Final
(Ontario) Trevor Bonot 🔨	0	0	0	0	X	X	X	X	0
(United States) Team Dropkin	3	2	1	2	X	X	X	X	8

Sheet 6	1	2	3	4	5	6	7	8	Final
(Saskatchewan) Carl deConinck Smith	0	1	0	1	1	0	1	X	4
(Saskatchewan) Rylan Kleiter 🔨	1	0	4	0	0	2	0	X	7

==== Draw 6 ====
Thursday, December 7, 9:00 pm

Sheet 1	1	2	3	4	5	6	7	8	Final
(Switzerland) Yannick Schwaller 🔨	1	0	0	0	1	0	X	X	2
(Ontario) Sam Mooibroek	0	1	2	1	0	3	X	X	7

Sheet 2	1	2	3	4	5	6	7	8	Final
(British Columbia) Catlin Schneider	0	2	2	0	1	0	1	X	6
(Saskatchewan) Mike McEwen 🔨	0	0	0	1	0	1	0	X	2

Sheet 3	1	2	3	4	5	6	7	8	Final
(Alberta) Kevin Koe	0	0	2	0	2	0	0	1	5
(Switzerland) Michael Brunner 🔨	0	1	0	1	0	4	0	0	6

Sheet 5	1	2	3	4	5	6	7	8	Final
(Sweden) Niklas Edin	0	1	0	0	1	0	2	2	6
(Japan) Riku Yanagisawa 🔨	1	0	1	1	0	2	0	0	5

==== Draw 7 ====
Friday, December 8, 8:00 am

Sheet 1	1	2	3	4	5	6	7	8	Final
(Manitoba) Braden Calvert	0	1	0	0	1	0	X	X	2
(Manitoba) Ryan Wiebe 🔨	2	0	3	1	0	2	X	X	8

Sheet 2	1	2	3	4	5	6	7	8	Final
(Saskatchewan) Steve Laycock 🔨	2	0	1	1	0	0	3	X	7
(South Korea) Park Jong-duk	0	1	0	0	2	1	0	X	4

Sheet 3	1	2	3	4	5	6	7	8	Final
(Alberta) Karsten Sturmay 🔨	0	2	1	0	1	0	1	0	5
(Saskatchewan) Rylan Kleiter	1	0	0	3	0	2	0	1	7

Sheet 4	1	2	3	4	5	6	7	8	Final
(Switzerland) Marco Hösli 🔨	3	0	1	0	1	0	4	X	9
(United States) Team Dropkin	0	1	0	3	0	1	0	X	5

==== Draw 9 ====
Friday, December 8, 2:30 pm

Sheet 1	1	2	3	4	5	6	7	8	Final
(Ontario) Trevor Bonot	0	0	2	0	3	0	2	1	8
(South Korea) Park Jong-duk 🔨	2	0	0	1	0	2	0	0	5

Sheet 2	1	2	3	4	5	6	7	8	Final
(Ontario) Sam Mooibroek	0	2	0	0	2	0	2	0	6
(Switzerland) Michael Brunner 🔨	1	0	0	1	0	2	0	1	5

Sheet 3	1	2	3	4	5	6	7	8	Final
(Saskatchewan) Carl deConinck Smith	0	1	0	2	0	2	0	X	5
(Manitoba) Braden Calvert 🔨	3	0	1	0	2	0	2	X	8

Sheet 4	1	2	3	4	5	6	7	8	Final
(Sweden) Niklas Edin 🔨	1	0	1	0	2	0	0	0	4
(British Columbia) Catlin Schneider	0	2	0	2	0	1	1	1	7

==== Draw 11 ====
Friday, December 8, 9:00 pm

Sheet 1	1	2	3	4	5	6	7	8	Final
(Switzerland) Yannick Schwaller	0	2	0	0	4	0	2	X	8
(Alberta) Kevin Koe 🔨	1	0	0	2	0	1	0	X	4

Sheet 2	1	2	3	4	5	6	7	8	Final
(Japan) Riku Yanagisawa	2	0	1	0	1	0	1	0	5
(Saskatchewan) Mike McEwen 🔨	0	3	0	2	0	1	0	1	7

Sheet 3	1	2	3	4	5	6	7	8	Final
(Switzerland) Marco Hösli	0	2	1	1	0	0	0	0	4
(Saskatchewan) Steve Laycock 🔨	2	0	0	0	1	2	1	3	9

Sheet 4	1	2	3	4	5	6	7	8	Final
(United States) Team Dropkin 🔨	2	2	1	0	3	X	X	X	8
(Ontario) Trevor Bonot	0	0	0	2	0	X	X	X	2

Sheet 5	1	2	3	4	5	6	7	8	Final
(Saskatchewan) Rylan Kleiter	0	1	0	1	0	3	0	0	5
(Manitoba) Ryan Wiebe 🔨	1	0	2	0	3	0	1	1	8

Sheet 6	1	2	3	4	5	6	7	8	Final
(Manitoba) Braden Calvert 🔨	0	1	1	0	0	0	1	1	4
(Alberta) Karsten Sturmay	0	0	0	3	0	2	0	0	5

==== Draw 13 ====
Saturday, December 9, 11:15 am

Sheet 1	1	2	3	4	5	6	7	8	9	Final
(Saskatchewan) Steve Laycock 🔨	0	1	0	4	0	3	0	0	1	9
(Switzerland) Michael Brunner	1	0	2	0	3	0	1	1	0	8

Sheet 2	1	2	3	4	5	6	7	8	Final
(Manitoba) Ryan Wiebe 🔨	1	0	0	0	2	0	0	X	3
(Sweden) Niklas Edin	0	2	0	2	0	2	2	X	8

Sheet 3	1	2	3	4	5	6	7	8	Final
(Saskatchewan) Mike McEwen	0	2	0	1	0	2	0	5	10
(Switzerland) Yannick Schwaller 🔨	2	0	2	0	1	0	1	0	6

Sheet 4	1	2	3	4	5	6	7	8	Final
(Japan) Riku Yanagisawa 🔨	0	0	1	0	2	0	2	0	5
(Alberta) Karsten Sturmay	1	0	0	2	0	1	0	2	6

Sheet 5	1	2	3	4	5	6	7	8	9	Final
(United States) Team Dropkin 🔨	2	0	0	0	0	0	2	0	1	5
(Alberta) Kevin Koe	0	2	0	0	1	0	0	1	0	4

Sheet 6	1	2	3	4	5	6	7	8	Final
(Switzerland) Marco Hösli 🔨	0	1	0	0	1	0	0	X	2
(Saskatchewan) Rylan Kleiter	0	0	3	1	0	2	3	X	9

==== Draw 15 ====
Saturday, December 9, 5:45 pm

Sheet 1	1	2	3	4	5	6	7	8	Final
(Saskatchewan) Rylan Kleiter 🔨	0	0	1	1	X	X	X	X	2
(Switzerland) Yannick Schwaller	4	3	0	0	X	X	X	X	7

Sheet 2	1	2	3	4	5	6	7	8	Final
(Alberta) Karsten Sturmay	0	0	0	3	0	0	X	X	3
(Switzerland) Michael Brunner 🔨	0	2	2	0	3	1	X	X	8

Sheet 3	1	2	3	4	5	6	7	8	Final
(United States) Team Dropkin 🔨	1	0	2	0	0	1	0	2	6
(Manitoba) Ryan Wiebe	0	2	0	0	0	0	1	0	3

=== Playoffs ===
Quarterfinals
1	(British Columbia) Catlin Schneider	3
8	(Switzerland) Michael Brunner	5
4	(Sweden) Niklas Edin	6
5	(Saskatchewan) Mike McEwen	7
2	(Ontario) Sam Mooibroek	6
7	(Switzerland) Yannick Schwaller	9
3	(Saskatchewan) Steve Laycock	4
6	(United States) Team Dropkin	7

Semifinals
8	(Switzerland) Michael Brunner	5
5	(Saskatchewan) Mike McEwen	4
7	(Switzerland) Yannick Schwaller	5
6	(United States) Team Dropkin	4

Final
8	(Switzerland) Michael Brunner	6
7	(Switzerland) Yannick Schwaller	8

==== Quarterfinals ====
Saturday, December 9, 9:00 pm

Sheet 2	1	2	3	4	5	6	7	8	Final
(Saskatchewan) Steve Laycock 🔨	2	0	0	0	1	0	1	X	4
(United States) Team Dropkin	0	2	1	2	0	2	0	X	7

Sheet 3	1	2	3	4	5	6	7	8	Final
(Ontario) Sam Mooibroek 🔨	0	2	1	0	1	0	2	0	6
(Switzerland) Yannick Schwaller	1	0	0	4	0	2	0	2	9

Sheet 4	1	2	3	4	5	6	7	8	Final
(Sweden) Niklas Edin 🔨	1	0	2	0	2	0	1	0	6
(Saskatchewan) Mike McEwen	0	2	0	1	0	3	0	1	7

Sheet 5	1	2	3	4	5	6	7	8	9	Final
(British Columbia) Catlin Schneider 🔨	0	1	0	0	0	1	0	1	0	3
(Switzerland) Michael Brunner	0	0	0	0	2	0	1	0	2	5

==== Semifinals ====
Sunday, December 10, 12:30 pm

Sheet 2	1	2	3	4	5	6	7	8	9	Final
(Switzerland) Michael Brunner	0	1	0	1	1	0	1	0	1	5
(Saskatchewan) Mike McEwen 🔨	0	0	1	0	0	2	0	1	0	4

Sheet 4	1	2	3	4	5	6	7	8	Final
(Switzerland) Yannick Schwaller 🔨	0	0	2	0	0	1	0	2	5
(United States) Team Dropkin	0	0	0	1	0	0	3	0	4

==== Final ====
Sunday, December 10, 4:00 pm

Sheet 5	1	2	3	4	5	6	7	8	Final
(Switzerland) Michael Brunner 🔨	1	0	0	3	0	1	0	1	6
(Switzerland) Yannick Schwaller	0	0	3	0	4	0	1	0	8

== Women ==
=== Teams ===
The teams are listed as follows:

Skip	Third	Second	Lead	Alternate	Locale
Sarah Anderson	Taylor Anderson	Lexi Lanigan	Leah Yavarow		(United States) Minneapolis, Minnesota
Penny Barker	Christie Gamble	Jenna Enge	Danielle Sicinski		Moose Jaw, Saskatchewan
Corryn Brown	Erin Pincott	Jennifer Armstrong	Samantha Fisher		Kamloops, British Columbia
Kate Cameron	Meghan Walter	Taylor McDonald	Mackenzie Elias		Winnipeg, Manitoba
Jolene Campbell	Abby Ackland	Rachel Erickson	Sara Oliver		Winnipeg, Manitoba
Stefania Constantini	Elena Mathis	Marta Lo Deserto	Angela Romei		Cortina d'Ampezzo, Italy
Hollie Duncan	Megan Balsdon	Rachelle Strybosch	Tess Guyatt		Woodstock, Ontario
Stephanie Schmidt (Fourth)	Sara England	Ashley Williamson	Michelle Englot (Skip)		Regina, Saskatchewan
Satsuki Fujisawa	Chinami Yoshida	Yumi Suzuki	Yurika Yoshida	Kotomi Ishizaki	Kitami, Japan
Jo-Ann Rizzo (Fourth)	Sarah Koltun	Margot Flemming	Kerry Galusha (Skip)		Yellowknife, Northwest Territories
Gim Eun-ji	Kim Min-ji	Kim Su-ji	Seol Ye-eun	Seol Ye-ji	Uijeongbu, South Korea
Clancy Grandy	Kayla MacMillan	Lindsay Dubue	Sarah Loken	Rachelle Brown	Vancouver, British Columbia
Serena Gray-Withers	Catherine Clifford	Brianna Cullen	Zoe Cinnamon		Edmonton, Alberta
Han Zhuo	Sun Jingyi	Wen Xinyue	Li Wanchang		Harbin, China
Anna Hasselborg	Sara McManus	Agnes Knochenhauer	Sofia Mabergs		Sundbyberg, Sweden
Amber Holland	Kim Schneider	Jill Springer	Debbie Lozinski		Kronau, Saskatchewan
Corrie Hürlimann	Celine Schwizgebel	Sarah Müller	Marina Lörtscher		Zug, Switzerland
Michèle Jäggi	Ashley Howard (Note: Ashley Howard spared for Team Jäggi who only had three players.)	Stefanie Berset	Lisa Muhmenthaler		Bern, Switzerland
Kim Eun-jung	Kim Kyeong-ae	Kim Cho-hi	Kim Seon-yeong	Kim Yeong-mi	Gangneung, South Korea
Tabitha Peterson	Cory Thiesse	Tara Peterson	Becca Hamilton		(United States) St. Paul, Minnesota
Xenia Schwaller	Selina Gafner	Fabienne Rieder	Selina Rychiger	Marion Wüest	Zurich, Switzerland
Robyn Silvernagle	Kelly Schafer	– (Note: Team Silvernagle played with three players.)	Kara Thevenot		North Battleford, Saskatchewan
Kayla Skrlik	– (Note: Team Skrlik played with three players.)	Geri-Lynn Ramsay	Ashton Skrlik		Calgary, Alberta
Alina Pätz (Fourth)	Silvana Tirinzoni (Skip)	Selina Witschonke	Carole Howald		Aarau, Switzerland
Isabella Wranå	Almida de Val	Maria Larsson	Linda Stenlund		Sundbyberg, Sweden

=== Round robin standings ===
Final Round Robin Standings

Key
Teams to Playoffs

Pool A	W	L	PF	PA
(Switzerland) Silvana Tirinzoni	4	0	31	12
(Alberta) Serena Gray-Withers	2	2	25	19
(British Columbia) Clancy Grandy	2	2	19	25
(Saskatchewan) Penny Barker	1	3	14	26
(British Columbia) Corryn Brown	1	3	20	27

Pool B	W	L	PF	PA
(Manitoba) Jolene Campbell	4	0	27	14
(South Korea) Gim Eun-ji	2	2	30	16
(Saskatchewan) Michelle Englot	2	2	19	25
(Northwest Territories) Kerry Galusha	1	3	14	27
(Manitoba) Kate Cameron	1	3	16	24

Pool C	W	L	PF	PA
(South Korea) Kim Eun-jung	4	0	21	10
(Switzerland) Xenia Schwaller	3	1	15	12
(Ontario) Hollie Duncan	2	2	16	14
(Sweden) Anna Hasselborg	1	3	16	22
(China) Han Zhuo	0	4	13	23

Pool D	W	L	PF	PA
(Sweden) Isabella Wranå	3	1	28	19
(Saskatchewan) Amber Holland	3	1	28	17
(Switzerland) Corrie Hürlimann	3	1	17	24
(United States) Sarah Anderson	1	3	23	26
(Italy) Stefania Constantini	0	4	15	25

Pool E	W	L	PF	PA
(Japan) Satsuki Fujisawa	4	0	25	15
(Alberta) Kayla Skrlik	3	1	28	18
(Saskatchewan) Robyn Silvernagle	2	2	22	19
(Switzerland) Michèle Jäggi	1	3	18	28
(United States) Tabitha Peterson	0	4	19	32

=== Round robin results ===
All draw times are listed in Central Time (UTC−06:00).

==== Draw 1 ====
Wednesday, December 6, 7:30 pm

Sheet 1	1	2	3	4	5	6	7	8	Final
(Japan) Satsuki Fujisawa 🔨	3	1	0	1	0	1	1	X	7
(Alberta) Kayla Skrlik	0	0	3	0	1	0	0	X	4

Sheet 2	1	2	3	4	5	6	7	8	9	Final
(Switzerland) Michèle Jäggi 🔨	1	0	0	0	1	1	0	1	0	4
(Saskatchewan) Robyn Silvernagle	0	0	2	0	0	0	2	0	2	6

Sheet 3	1	2	3	4	5	6	7	8	Final
(South Korea) Kim Eun-jung 🔨	0	1	1	0	1	1	1	X	5
(Ontario) Hollie Duncan	0	0	0	1	0	0	0	X	1

Sheet 5	1	2	3	4	5	6	7	8	Final
(South Korea) Gim Eun-ji 🔨	0	2	4	1	0	4	X	X	11
(Saskatchewan) Michelle Englot	1	0	0	0	1	0	X	X	2

Sheet 6	1	2	3	4	5	6	7	8	9	Final
(Italy) Stefania Constantini 🔨	0	1	0	1	0	1	0	2	0	5
(Saskatchewan) Amber Holland	0	0	2	0	1	0	2	0	1	6

==== Draw 2 ====
Thursday, December 7, 8:00 am

Sheet 1	1	2	3	4	5	6	7	8	Final
(Manitoba) Kate Cameron	1	0	0	1	0	X	X	X	2
(Northwest Territories) Kerry Galusha 🔨	0	1	3	0	4	X	X	X	8

Sheet 3	1	2	3	4	5	6	7	8	Final
(Sweden) Anna Hasselborg 🔨	0	0	2	0	1	1	0	1	5
(China) Han Zhuo	0	2	0	1	0	0	1	0	4

Sheet 6	1	2	3	4	5	6	7	8	9	Final
(Sweden) Isabella Wranå	0	1	0	3	0	0	2	0	1	7
(United States) Sarah Anderson 🔨	1	0	1	0	1	2	0	1	0	6

==== Draw 3 ====
Thursday, December 7, 11:15 am

Sheet 1	1	2	3	4	5	6	7	8	Final
(Manitoba) Jolene Campbell 🔨	2	0	3	0	2	0	1	X	8
(Saskatchewan) Michelle Englot	0	1	0	1	0	1	0	X	3

Sheet 2	1	2	3	4	5	6	7	8	Final
(British Columbia) Clancy Grandy 🔨	2	0	2	0	0	2	0	1	7
(British Columbia) Corryn Brown	0	1	0	3	0	0	1	0	5

Sheet 3	1	2	3	4	5	6	7	8	Final
(Switzerland) Silvana Tirinzoni	3	1	0	1	2	3	X	X	10
(Saskatchewan) Penny Barker 🔨	0	0	1	0	0	0	X	X	1

Sheet 4	1	2	3	4	5	6	7	8	Final
(South Korea) Kim Eun-jung 🔨	0	0	0	1	0	1	1	X	3
(Switzerland) Xenia Schwaller	0	0	0	0	0	0	0	X	0

Sheet 5	1	2	3	4	5	6	7	8	Final
(United States) Tabitha Peterson 🔨	0	1	0	2	0	1	0	X	4
(Saskatchewan) Robyn Silvernagle	1	0	4	0	2	0	3	X	10

==== Draw 5 ====
Thursday, December 7, 5:45 pm

Sheet 2	1	2	3	4	5	6	7	8	Final
(South Korea) Gim Eun-ji 🔨	0	2	1	0	1	0	5	X	9
(Northwest Territories) Kerry Galusha	0	0	0	1	0	1	0	X	2

Sheet 3	1	2	3	4	5	6	7	8	Final
(British Columbia) Corryn Brown	1	1	2	0	1	0	0	2	7
(Alberta) Serena Gray-Withers 🔨	0	0	0	3	0	2	1	0	6

Sheet 4	1	2	3	4	5	6	7	8	Final
(Switzerland) Michèle Jäggi 🔨	1	0	0	1	0	1	X	X	3
(Alberta) Kayla Skrlik	0	2	2	0	4	0	X	X	8

Sheet 5	1	2	3	4	5	6	7	8	Final
(Italy) Stefania Constantini 🔨	0	1	0	1	0	0	0	0	2
(Switzerland) Corrie Hürlimann	0	0	2	0	0	1	0	1	4

==== Draw 6 ====
Thursday, December 7, 9:00 pm

Sheet 4	1	2	3	4	5	6	7	8	Final
(Japan) Satsuki Fujisawa	0	2	0	2	0	2	0	X	6
(United States) Tabitha Peterson 🔨	1	0	1	0	1	0	1	X	4

Sheet 6	1	2	3	4	5	6	7	8	Final
(China) Han Zhuo	0	0	1	0	1	0	0	X	2
(Ontario) Hollie Duncan 🔨	1	2	0	1	0	1	1	X	6

==== Draw 7 ====
Friday, December 8, 8:00 am

Sheet 5	1	2	3	4	5	6	7	8	Final
(British Columbia) Corryn Brown 🔨	0	1	0	1	0	2	0	0	4
(Saskatchewan) Penny Barker	2	0	1	0	1	0	1	2	7

Sheet 6	1	2	3	4	5	6	7	8	Final
(Alberta) Kayla Skrlik	0	3	0	0	1	0	3	X	7
(Saskatchewan) Robyn Silvernagle 🔨	1	0	0	1	0	1	0	X	3

==== Draw 8 ====
Friday, December 8, 11:15 am

Sheet 1	1	2	3	4	5	6	7	8	Final
(Switzerland) Silvana Tirinzoni	0	0	1	0	3	0	0	1	5
(British Columbia) Clancy Grandy 🔨	0	1	0	1	0	1	1	0	4

Sheet 2	1	2	3	4	5	6	7	8	Final
(Manitoba) Jolene Campbell 🔨	3	0	3	0	1	X	X	X	7
(Northwest Territories) Kerry Galusha	0	1	0	0	0	X	X	X	1

Sheet 3	1	2	3	4	5	6	7	8	Final
(Sweden) Isabella Wranå 🔨	3	0	0	2	0	1	0	3	9
(Saskatchewan) Amber Holland	0	1	1	0	1	0	2	0	5

Sheet 4	1	2	3	4	5	6	7	8	Final
(Sweden) Anna Hasselborg	0	0	2	0	0	0	0	X	2
(Switzerland) Xenia Schwaller 🔨	1	0	0	0	2	2	0	X	5

Sheet 5	1	2	3	4	5	6	7	8	Final
(Japan) Satsuki Fujisawa 🔨	2	3	0	0	3	0	X	X	8
(Switzerland) Michèle Jäggi	0	0	2	1	0	1	X	X	4

Sheet 6	1	2	3	4	5	6	7	8	Final
(Manitoba) Kate Cameron	0	2	0	0	0	1	0	0	3
(Saskatchewan) Michelle Englot 🔨	1	0	2	0	0	0	0	2	5

==== Draw 9 ====
Friday, December 8, 2:30 pm

Sheet 5	1	2	3	4	5	6	7	8	Final
(Alberta) Serena Gray-Withers	0	1	1	2	1	0	1	X	6
(Saskatchewan) Penny Barker 🔨	0	0	0	0	0	1	0	X	1

Sheet 6	1	2	3	4	5	6	7	8	Final
(Italy) Stefania Constantini	0	1	0	2	0	3	0	0	6
(United States) Sarah Anderson 🔨	0	0	2	0	2	0	1	3	8

==== Draw 10 ====
Friday, December 8, 5:45 pm

Sheet 1	1	2	3	4	5	6	7	8	Final
(Switzerland) Corrie Hürlimann	0	0	0	0	0	X	X	X	0
(Saskatchewan) Amber Holland 🔨	2	1	2	1	5	X	X	X	11

Sheet 2	1	2	3	4	5	6	7	8	Final
(United States) Tabitha Peterson 🔨	1	0	0	2	0	2	0	X	5
(Alberta) Kayla Skrlik	0	1	3	0	1	0	4	X	9

Sheet 3	1	2	3	4	5	6	7	8	Final
(Switzerland) Xenia Schwaller 🔨	0	0	0	0	2	1	0	1	4
(Ontario) Hollie Duncan	0	0	1	1	0	0	1	0	3

Sheet 4	1	2	3	4	5	6	7	8	Final
(Northwest Territories) Kerry Galusha	0	0	3	0	0	0	X	X	3
(Saskatchewan) Michelle Englot 🔨	3	1	0	0	1	4	X	X	9

Sheet 5	1	2	3	4	5	6	7	8	Final
(South Korea) Kim Eun-jung 🔨	1	1	0	1	0	2	0	1	6
(China) Han Zhuo	0	0	1	0	1	0	1	0	3

Sheet 6	1	2	3	4	5	6	7	8	9	Final
(South Korea) Gim Eun-ji 🔨	1	1	0	1	0	1	0	1	0	5
(Manitoba) Jolene Campbell	0	0	1	0	1	0	3	0	1	6

==== Draw 12 ====
Saturday, December 9, 8:00 am

Sheet 1	1	2	3	4	5	6	7	8	9	Final
(Manitoba) Kate Cameron	1	0	1	0	2	0	1	0	0	5
(Manitoba) Jolene Campbell 🔨	0	2	0	1	0	1	0	1	1	6

Sheet 2	1	2	3	4	5	6	7	8	Final
(Switzerland) Corrie Hürlimann	0	0	1	1	0	3	1	1	7
(United States) Sarah Anderson 🔨	2	1	0	0	3	0	0	0	6

Sheet 3	1	2	3	4	5	6	7	8	9	Final
(British Columbia) Clancy Grandy 🔨	0	1	2	0	0	2	0	0	1	6
(Saskatchewan) Penny Barker	1	0	0	2	0	0	1	1	0	5

Sheet 4	1	2	3	4	5	6	7	8	Final
(Sweden) Isabella Wranå 🔨	2	1	0	1	3	X	X	X	7
(Italy) Stefania Constantini	0	0	2	0	0	X	X	X	2

Sheet 5	1	2	3	4	5	6	7	8	Final
(Switzerland) Silvana Tirinzoni	3	0	3	0	0	3	X	X	9
(Alberta) Serena Gray-Withers 🔨	0	1	0	1	1	0	X	X	3

Sheet 6	1	2	3	4	5	6	7	8	Final
(Sweden) Anna Hasselborg	0	3	0	1	0	2	0	0	6
(South Korea) Kim Eun-jung 🔨	1	0	3	0	2	0	0	1	7

==== Draw 14 ====
Saturday, December 9, 2:30 pm

Sheet 1	1	2	3	4	5	6	7	8	Final
(Switzerland) Xenia Schwaller 🔨	0	0	2	0	0	1	0	3	6
(China) Han Zhuo	0	2	0	1	0	0	1	0	4

Sheet 2	1	2	3	4	5	6	7	8	Final
(Sweden) Anna Hasselborg 🔨	1	0	1	0	0	0	1	X	3
(Ontario) Hollie Duncan	0	2	0	1	2	1	0	X	6

Sheet 3	1	2	3	4	5	6	7	8	9	Final
(United States) Tabitha Peterson	0	2	0	0	2	0	0	2	0	6
(Switzerland) Michèle Jäggi 🔨	3	0	0	1	0	1	1	0	1	7

Sheet 4	1	2	3	4	5	6	7	8	9	Final
(Switzerland) Silvana Tirinzoni	0	1	0	1	1	0	1	0	3	7
(British Columbia) Corryn Brown 🔨	1	0	1	0	0	0	0	2	0	4

Sheet 5	1	2	3	4	5	6	7	8	Final
(Japan) Satsuki Fujisawa 🔨	0	2	0	0	0	1	0	1	4
(Saskatchewan) Robyn Silvernagle	0	0	1	0	1	0	1	0	3

Sheet 6	1	2	3	4	5	6	7	8	Final
(British Columbia) Clancy Grandy	0	0	0	2	0	0	X	X	2
(Alberta) Serena Gray-Withers 🔨	3	1	1	0	1	4	X	X	10

==== Draw 15 ====
Saturday, December 9, 5:45 pm

Sheet 4	1	2	3	4	5	6	7	8	Final
(United States) Sarah Anderson	0	1	0	2	0	0	0	X	3
(Saskatchewan) Amber Holland 🔨	0	0	2	0	2	1	1	X	6

Sheet 5	1	2	3	4	5	6	7	8	Final
(South Korea) Gim Eun-ji 🔨	1	1	0	0	0	2	1	0	5
(Manitoba) Kate Cameron	0	0	2	1	1	0	0	2	6

Sheet 6	1	2	3	4	5	6	7	8	Final
(Sweden) Isabella Wranå	0	1	0	1	0	2	1	0	5
(Switzerland) Corrie Hürlimann 🔨	1	0	1	0	2	0	0	2	6

=== Playoffs ===
Qualification Games
7	(Switzerland) Xenia Schwaller	4
10	(South Korea) Gim Eun-ji	7
8	(Saskatchewan) Amber Holland	2
9	(Switzerland) Corrie Hürlimann	7

Quarterfinals
1	(South Korea) Kim Eun-jung	7
10	(South Korea) Gim Eun-ji	3
4	(Switzerland) Silvana Tirinzoni	5
5	(Sweden) Isabella Wranå	7
2	(Japan) Satsuki Fujisawa	6
9	(Switzerland) Corrie Hürlimann	1
3	(Manitoba) Jolene Campbell	7
6	(Alberta) Kayla Skrlik	2

Semifinals
1	(South Korea) Kim Eun-jung	11
5	(Sweden) Isabella Wranå	6
2	(Japan) Satsuki Fujisawa	2
3	(Manitoba) Jolene Campbell	8

Final
1	(South Korea) Kim Eun-jung	6
3	(Manitoba) Jolene Campbell	4

==== Qualification Games ====
Saturday, December 9, 9:00 pm

Sheet 1	1	2	3	4	5	6	7	8	Final
(Saskatchewan) Amber Holland 🔨	0	0	1	0	0	1	0	X	2
(Switzerland) Corrie Hürlimann	1	0	0	2	2	0	2	X	7

Sheet 6	1	2	3	4	5	6	7	8	Final
(Switzerland) Xenia Schwaller 🔨	0	0	1	0	2	0	1	0	4
(South Korea) Gim Eun-ji	0	1	0	2	0	2	0	2	7

==== Quarterfinals ====
Sunday, December 10, 9:00 am

Sheet 2	1	2	3	4	5	6	7	8	Final
(South Korea) Kim Eun-jung 🔨	4	0	0	1	1	0	1	X	7
(South Korea) Gim Eun-ji	0	1	1	0	0	1	0	X	3

Sheet 3	1	2	3	4	5	6	7	8	Final
(Japan) Satsuki Fujisawa 🔨	3	1	1	1	0	X	X	X	6
(Switzerland) Corrie Hürlimann	0	0	0	0	1	X	X	X	1

Sheet 4	1	2	3	4	5	6	7	8	Final
(Manitoba) Jolene Campbell 🔨	0	1	0	3	2	1	X	X	7
(Alberta) Kayla Skrlik	0	0	2	0	0	0	X	X	2

Sheet 4	1	2	3	4	5	6	7	8	Final
(Switzerland) Silvana Tirinzoni 🔨	0	3	0	2	0	0	0	X	5
(Sweden) Isabella Wranå	1	0	3	0	0	2	1	X	7

==== Semifinals ====
Sunday, December 10, 12:30 pm

Sheet 3	1	2	3	4	5	6	7	8	Final
(South Korea) Kim Eun-jung 🔨	4	1	0	0	1	0	0	5	11
(Sweden) Isabella Wranå	0	0	1	1	0	2	2	0	6

Sheet 5	1	2	3	4	5	6	7	8	Final
(Japan) Satsuki Fujisawa	0	0	1	0	1	0	0	X	2
(Manitoba) Jolene Campbell 🔨	0	3	0	1	0	2	2	X	8

==== Final ====
Sunday, December 10, 4:00 pm

Sheet 2	1	2	3	4	5	6	7	8	Final
(South Korea) Kim Eun-jung 🔨	2	0	1	0	0	0	2	1	6
(Manitoba) Jolene Campbell	0	1	0	1	1	1	0	0	4
