= Swift Current Rampage =

- City: Swift Current, Saskatchewan
- League: Prairie Gold Lacrosse League
- Division: North
- Founded: 2003
- Home arena: Credit Union iPlex
- Colours: Navy, Gold and silver
- Head coach: Sheldon Keubler

The Swift Current Rampage were a Junior box lacrosse team based out of Swift Current, Saskatchewan, playing in the top league in Saskatchewan, the Prairie Gold Lacrosse League. They joined the Saskatchewan Major Box Lacrosse League as an expansion franchise in 2003 and use the Credit Union iPlex as their home arena. The team folded in 2009 and were replaced by the Swift Current Wolverines in 2019

== Year By Year Results ==
2003 - Inaugural Season - The Rampage won their first ever game in the Saskatchewan Major Box Lacrosse League 9-6 over the Big River Extreme. The first goal scored by a Rampage player was scored by R.J. Larochelle. While the first hat trick was scored by Justin Wilchynski. He also won the team scoring title during their inaugural season. The Rampage surprised the league finishing 5th overall in the standings and one point out of a playoff spot. As they were expected to finish fighting to stay out of the league basement. The league that season consisted of Moose Jaw, Saskatoon, Yorkton, Assiniboia, Swift Current, Regina, Prince Albert and Big River.

2004 - The Rampage joined the Tier II division of the newly named Prairie Gold Lacrosse League. Brett Kuglin had a break out season and led the team in scoring. The Rampage finished in 4th place and played the Moose Jaw Mustangs 2 in their first ever playoff game. The Moose Jaw Mustangs 2 went on to win the league championship.

2005 - The Rampage again improved to 3rd place and was only a couple points behind first and second. Brett Kuglin continued on from his 2004 season and lead the team in scoring. Brett Kuglin, Justin Wilchynski and Kyle Mackay were named to the PGLL All-Star Game which was played in Prince Albert. The Rampage lost in a close but hard fought series against the Assiniboia Attack in the first round of playoffs.
