= Tom Settee =

Thomas Naphtahli "Little Chief" Settee (1914–2012) was a Canadian soldier and boxer.

Born in Cumberland House, Saskatchewan on 29 October 1914, Settee attended Elkhorn Residential School. He had a lung disorder and began training in boxing in 1937 in an effort to ameliorate his condition. He also served with the North Saskatchewan Regiment. At the outbreak of the Second World War, Settee was sent to Europe with the Regina Rifles. While overseas he continued to compete in boxing, winning the Canadian Army overseas boxing championship in 1944. That same year he participated in Operation Overlord and was wounded in action.

After the war he won the Western Canadian welterweight and middleweight championships under the name "Tommy Deschambeault" and became a mentor to younger boxers. He also opened a barbershop after retiring in 1948. He was inducted into the Canadian Boxing Hall of Fame in 1991 and the Prince Albert Sports Hall of Fame in 1992.
