= Western Showdown =

RBC Dominion Securities Western Showdown
- Established: 2021
- Host city: Swift Current, Saskatchewan
- Arena: Credit Union iPlex (Swift Current Curling Club)
- Purse: $36,000 (men's and women's)

Current champions (2026)
- Men: (Italy) Joël Retornaz
- Women: (Japan) Miyu Ueno

The Western Showdown, known as the RBC Dominion Securities Western Showdown for sponsorship reasons, is an annual international curling tournament held at the Credit Union iPlex in Swift Current, Saskatchewan. The combined purse for both the men's and women's events is $100,000. It features some of the top teams in the world, as well as local Saskatchewan teams.

The event began in 2021 as a men's only event, as a way to give back to the curling community in Swift Current for supporting the Swift Current Curling Club during the COVID-19 pandemic in Saskatchewan. It featured 24 teams, and a $50,000 purse. A women's event was added in 2022, but held two weeks before the men's event. The women's event featured 30 teams and a purse of $45,000, while the men's event featured 16 teams and a purse of $36,000. In 2023, the events were combined. In 2023, the event featured 43 teams (18 men's and 25 women's). The men played a triple-knockout, while the women's event was a round robin.

== Sponsors ==
- IG Wealth Management (2021–22) - men's.
- RBC Dominion Securities (2022) - women's.
- Nutrien Ag Solutions (2023)
- RBC Dominion Securities (2024–present)

== Winners ==
=== Men ===
Year	Champion team	Runner-up team	Purse
2021	(Alberta) Kevin Koe, John Morris, B. J. Neufeld, Ben Hebert	(Ontario) Brad Jacobs, Marc Kennedy, E. J. Harnden, Ryan Harnden	$50,000
2022	(Sweden) Oskar Eriksson, Rasmus Wranå, Christoffer Sundgren (3 player team)	(Alberta) Kevin Koe, Tyler Tardi, Bradley Thiessen, Karrick Martin	$36,000
2023	(Switzerland) Benoît Schwarz-van Berkel (Fourth), Yannick Schwaller (Skip), Sven Michel, Pablo Lachat	(Switzerland) Michael Brunner, Anthony Petoud, Romano Meier, Andreas Gerlach	$46,000
2024	(Alberta) Kevin Koe, Aaron Sluchinski, Tyler Tardi, Karrick Martin	(Alberta) Brad Jacobs, Marc Kennedy, Brett Gallant, Ben Hebert	$50,000
2025	(Scotland) Bruce Mouat, Grant Hardie, Bobby Lammie, Hammy McMillan Jr.	(Saskatchewan) Rylan Kleiter, Joshua Mattern, Matthew Hall, Trevor Johnson	$40,000
2026	(Italy) Joël Retornaz, Stefano Gilli, Andrea Gilli, Alberto Pimpini	(Saskatchewan) Tyler Tardi, Colton Flasch, Kevin Marsh, Dan Marsh	$36,000

=== Women ===
Year	Champion team	Runner-up team	Purse
2022	(Switzerland) Alina Pätz (Fourth), Silvana Tirinzoni (Skip), Carole Howald, Briar Schwaller-Hürlimann	(Manitoba) Meghan Walter, Kelly Schafer, Sara Oliver, Mackenzie Elias	$45,000
2023	(South Korea) Kim Eun-jung, Kim Kyeong-ae, Kim Cho-hi, Kim Seon-yeong, Kim Yeong-mi	(Manitoba) Jolene Campbell, Abby Ackland, Rachel Erickson, Sara Oliver	$50,000
2024	(Switzerland) Xenia Schwaller, Selina Gafner, Fabienne Rieder, Selina Rychiger	(Saskatchewan) Stephanie Schmidt (Fourth), Sara Miller, Ashley Williamson, Michelle Englot (Skip)	$50,000
2025	(Switzerland) Alina Pätz (Fourth), Silvana Tirinzoni (Skip), Carole Howald, Selina Witschonke	(South Korea) Ha Seung-youn, Kim Hye-rin, Yang Tae-i, Kim Su-jin	$40,000
2026	(Japan) Miyu Ueno, Asuka Kanai, Yui Ueno (3 player team)	(Japan) Ikue Kitazawa, Seina Nakajima, Minori Suzuki, Hasumi Ishigooka	$36,000
