= Yorkton =

City in Saskatchewan, Canada

- City
- City of Yorkton
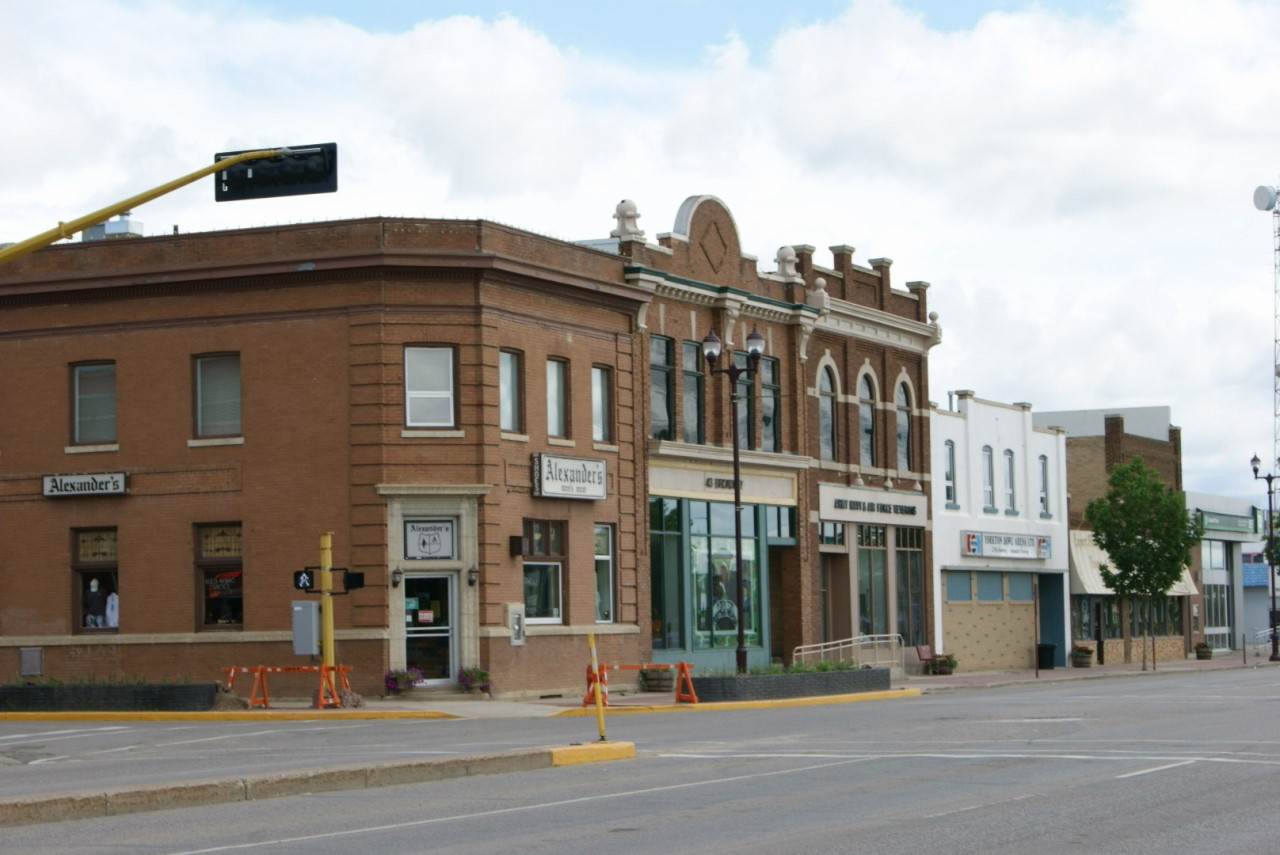
- Downtown on Broadway Street

- Flag Logo
- Motto: "Where Good Things Happen"
- Location within Saskatchewan Location within Canada
- Coordinates: 51°12′50″N 102°27′46″W
- Country: Canada
- Province: Saskatchewan
- Incorporated village: July 15, 1894
- Incorporated town: 1900
- Incorporated city: February 1, 1928

Government
  - Type: Mayor and Council
  - Mayor: Aaron Kienle
  - MLA: David Chan (SKP)
  - MP: Cathay Wagantall (CON)

Area
  - City: 25.77 km^{2} (9.95 sq mi)
- Elevation: 500 m (1,600 ft)

Population (2021)
  - City: 16,280
  - Density: 449.8/km^{2} (1,165/sq mi)
  - Metro: 18,905
  - Metro density: 22.4/km^{2} (58/sq mi)
- Time zone: UTC−6 (CST)
  - Summer (DST): UTC−6 (CST)
- Forward sortation area: S3N
- Area codes: 306 / 639
- Highways: Highway 16 / Highway 9 / Highway 10 / Highway 52
- Post office established: January 1, 1884
- Website: City of Yorkton

Yorkton is a city located in southeastern Saskatchewan, Canada. It is about 300 kilometres (190 mi) southeast of Saskatoon and 450 kilometres (280 mi) northwest of Winnipeg, Manitoba and is the sixth-largest city in the province. Yorkton was founded in 1882 and incorporated as a city in 1928. The city is bordered by the rural municipalities of Orkney to the north, west, and south, and Wallace on the east.

== History ==
In 1882, a group of businessmen and investors formed the York Farmers Colonization Company. Authorized to issue up to $300,000 in debentures and lenient government credit terms on land purchases encouraged company representatives to visit the District of Assiniboia of the North-West Territories with the intent to view some crown land available near the Manitoba border. They were impressed with what they saw and the group purchased portions of six townships near the Little Whitesand River (now Yorkton Creek) for the purpose of settlement and to establish a centre for trade there. This centre would become known as York Colony.

The company founded the settlers' colony on the banks of the Little Whitesand River where lots were given freely to settlers who purchased land from them. The colony remained at its site until 1889. It was originally located at PT SE 1/4 13-26-4 W2M.

In 1889, the rail line was extended to the Yorkton area. It was at this time the colony townsite relocated alongside the new rail line.

== Geography ==
Yorkton is located in the aspen parkland ecosystem, about 300 kilometres (190 mi) southeast of Saskatoon. The terrain is mainly one of agriculture and there is no forestry industry. It is also in an area of black calcareous chernozemic soils. The Yorkton area was located on the edge of an area of a maximum glacial lake. The quaternary geology has left the area as a moraine plain consisting of glacial deposits. The bedrock geology is the Pembina Member of Vermillion River Formation and Riding Mountain Formation. Yorkton is located in the physiographic region of the Quill Lake-Yorkton Plain region of the Saskatchewan Plains Region.

== Climate ==
Yorkton has a humid continental climate (Köppen climate classification Dfb), with extreme seasonal temperatures. It has warm summers and cold winters, with the average daily temperatures ranging from −17.9 °C (−0.2 °F) in January to 17.8 °C (64.0 °F) in July.

The highest temperature ever recorded in Yorkton was 40.6 °C (105 °F) on 19 July 1941. The coldest temperature ever recorded was −46.1 °C (−51 °F) on 20 January 1943.

Climate data for Yorkton Municipal Airport, 1981–2010 normals, extremes 1884–present
Month	Jan	Feb	Mar	Apr	May	Jun	Jul	Aug	Sep	Oct	Nov	Dec	Year
Record high humidex	6.7	10.4	21.1	29.9	37.5	42.7	43.4	44.7	37.3	30.2	20.0	12.4	44.7
Record high °C (°F)	8.3 (46.9)	11.0 (51.8)	21.1 (70.0)	31.7 (89.1)	38.4 (101.1)	38.3 (100.9)	40.6 (105.1)	38.3 (100.9)	36.1 (97.0)	31.1 (88.0)	20.6 (69.1)	12.7 (54.9)	40.6 (105.1)
Mean daily maximum °C (°F)	−11.4 (11.5)	−7.6 (18.3)	−1.5 (29.3)	9.3 (48.7)	17.3 (63.1)	21.7 (71.1)	24.3 (75.7)	23.9 (75.0)	17.5 (63.5)	9.5 (49.1)	−1.7 (28.9)	−6.1 (21.0)	7.7 (45.9)
Daily mean °C (°F)	−16.7 (1.9)	−12.8 (9.0)	−6.7 (19.9)	3.2 (37.8)	10.4 (50.7)	15.5 (59.9)	17.9 (64.2)	17.1 (62.8)	11.1 (52.0)	3.7 (38.7)	−6.3 (20.7)	−14.1 (6.6)	1.9 (35.4)
Mean daily minimum °C (°F)	−22.0 (−7.6)	−18.0 (−0.4)	−11.9 (10.6)	−2.9 (26.8)	3.5 (38.3)	9.2 (48.6)	11.5 (52.7)	10.2 (50.4)	4.7 (40.5)	−2.2 (28.0)	−10.9 (12.4)	−19.0 (−2.2)	−4.0 (24.8)
Record low °C (°F)	−46.1 (−51.0)	−45.6 (−50.1)	−42.8 (−45.0)	−27.2 (−17.0)	−13.5 (7.7)	−5.0 (23.0)	−1.1 (30.0)	−2.8 (27.0)	−12.8 (9.0)	−28.3 (−18.9)	−37.5 (−35.5)	−42.2 (−44.0)	−46.1 (−51.0)
Record low wind chill	−58.4	−58.0	−52.0	−40.0	−16.5	−4.9	0.0	−5.7	−12.9	−29.6	−45.8	−55.6	−58.4
Average precipitation mm (inches)	16 (0.6)	11.2 (0.44)	20 (0.8)	21.6 (0.85)	51.3 (2.02)	80.1 (3.15)	78.2 (3.08)	62.2 (2.45)	44.9 (1.77)	26.5 (1.04)	16.4 (0.65)	21 (0.8)	449.3 (17.69)
Average rainfall mm (inches)	0.2 (0.01)	0.4 (0.02)	3.6 (0.14)	11.7 (0.46)	48.3 (1.90)	79.9 (3.15)	78.2 (3.08)	62.2 (2.45)	43.5 (1.71)	19.2 (0.76)	2.1 (0.08)	0.5 (0.02)	349.6 (13.76)
Average snowfall cm (inches)	20 (7.9)	12.7 (5.0)	18.1 (7.1)	11.1 (4.4)	3.4 (1.3)	0.2 (0.1)	0 (0)	0 (0)	1.4 (0.6)	8.5 (3.3)	17.2 (6.8)	24.8 (9.8)	117.4 (46.2)
Average precipitation days (≥ 0.2 mm)	11.36	8.62	9.91	9.54	15.64	20.96	19.05	16.3	13.48	10.43	9.23	12.11	157.4
Average rainy days (≥ 0.2 mm)	0.36	0.72	2.37	5.68	14.84	20.96	19.05	16.3	12.88	7.39	1.92	0.79	103
Average snowy days (≥ 0.2 cm)	12	8	7	3	1	0	0	0	1	4	9	11	58
Average relative humidity (%)	70.3	69.8	66.1	50.4	43.8	50.3	52.5	49.6	50	54.7	69.1	72.3	58.2
Mean monthly sunshine hours	104.2	131.9	174.1	230.0	268.0	268.1	315.0	285.8	195.7	155.0	99.9	88.6	2,316.3
Percentage possible sunshine	39.9	46.8	47.4	55.5	55.6	54.2	63.2	63.2	51.4	46.6	37.2	35.9	49.7
Source: Environment Canada

=== Extreme weather events ===
- On the evening of July 1, 2010, Yorkton received a severe thunderstorm warning. Soon after, Yorkton was experiencing pea sized hail, strong winds, lightning, and heavy rain. The rain created a flash flood. Broadway Street received the worst of the flood with local businesses being severely damaged, with one being completely destroyed. The city of Yorkton declared a State of Emergency and the Canadian Red Cross helped out with the victims of the flood.
- On the weekend of June 29, 2014, Yorkton declared a State of Emergency after rain caused flash floods in south-eastern Saskatchewan.

== Demographics ==
Historical populations
Year	Pop.	±%
1901	700	—
1911	2,309	+229.9%
1921	5,151	+123.1%
1931	5,027	−2.4%
1941	5,586	+11.1%
1951	7,074	+26.6%
1961	9,995	+41.3%
1971	13,430	+34.4%
1981	15,339	+14.2%
1991	15,315	−0.2%
2001	15,107	−1.4%
2006	15,038	−0.5%
2011	15,669	+4.2%
2016	16,343	+4.3%
2021	16,280	−0.4%
Source: Statistics Canada

In the 2021 Census of Population conducted by Statistics Canada, Yorkton had a population of 16,280 living in 6,974 of its 7,529 total private dwellings, a change of −0.4% from its 2016 population of 16,343. With a land area of 36.19 km^{2} (13.97 sq mi), it had a population density of 449.8/km^{2} (1,165.1/sq mi) in 2021.

Canada census – Yorkton community profile

	2021	2016	2011
Population	16,280 (-0.4% from 2016)	16,343 (4.3% from 2011)	15,669 (4.2% from 2006)
Land area	36.19 km^{2} (13.97 sq mi)	36.32 km^{2} (14.02 sq mi)	25.77 km^{2} (9.95 sq mi)
Population density	449.8/km^{2} (1,165/sq mi)	449.9/km^{2} (1,165/sq mi)	608.1/km^{2} (1,575/sq mi)
Median age			42.7 (M: 40.4, F: 44.8)
Private dwellings	6,974 (total)		7,175 (total)
Median household income

References: 2021 2016 2011

=== Ethnicity ===
The first settlers to the Yorkton colony were English from Eastern Ontario and Great Britain. 6 miles (9.7 km) west were Scottish settlers at the settlement of Orkney. A significant number of residents are also descended from immigrants from Ukraine who came in the early 20th century.

Panethnic groups in the City of Yorkton (2001−2021)
Panethnic group	2021		2016		2011		2006		2001	
Panethnic group	Pop.	%	Pop.	%	Pop.	%	Pop.	%	Pop.	%
European (Note: Statistic includes all persons that did not make up part of a visible minority or an indigenous identity.)	11,495	72.2%	12,725	79.93%	13,065	85.48%	12,750	86.44%	12,940	87.31%
Indigenous	2,055	12.91%	1,900	11.93%	1,700	11.12%	1,715	11.63%	1,655	11.17%
Southeast Asian (Note: Statistic includes total responses of "Filipino" and "Southeast Asian" under visible minority section on census.)	1,120	7.04%	625	3.93%	240	1.57%	10	0.07%	10	0.07%
South Asian	635	3.99%	250	1.57%	0	0%	40	0.27%	25	0.17%
African	345	2.17%	245	1.54%	155	1.01%	110	0.75%	30	0.2%
East Asian (Note: Statistic includes total responses of "Chinese", "Korean", and "Japanese" under visible minority section on census.)	120	0.75%	105	0.66%	95	0.62%	85	0.58%	140	0.94%
Middle Eastern (Note: Statistic includes total responses of "West Asian" and "Arab" under visible minority section on census.)	50	0.31%	50	0.31%	0	0%	25	0.17%	20	0.13%
Latin American	40	0.25%	10	0.06%	0	0%	15	0.1%	0	0%
Other/multiracial (Note: Statistic includes total responses of "Visible minority, n.i.e." and "Multiple visible minorities" under visible minority section on census.)	60	0.38%	20	0.13%	0	0%	0	0%	0	0%
Total responses	15,920	97.79%	15,920	97.41%	15,285	97.55%	14,750	98.08%	14,820	98.1%
Total population	16,280	100%	16,343	100%	15,669	100%	15,038	100%	15,107	100%
Note: Totals greater than 100% due to multiple origin responses

Major ethnic groups in Yorkton, Saskatchewan, 2021
Ethnic group	Population	Percent
Ukrainian	4,805	30.2%
English	3,870	24.3%
German	3,540	22.2%
Scottish	2,185	13.7%
First Nations/Métis	2,055	13.7%
Irish	1,610	10.1%
Polish	1,405	8.8%
Scandinavian	1,350	8.5%
French	1,060	6.7%
Filipino	1,030	6.5%
Total respondent population	15,925	100%

== Attractions ==
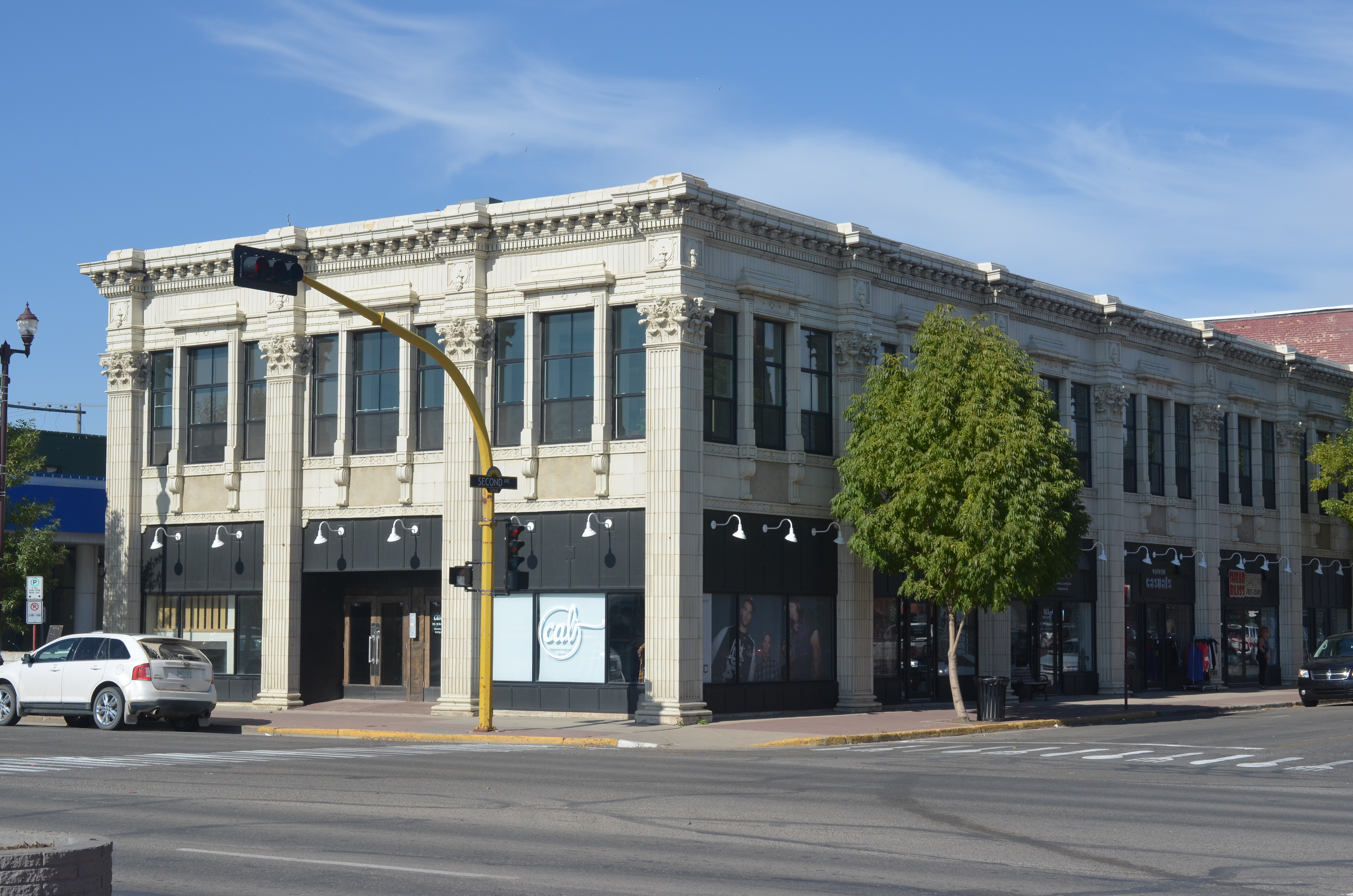
Hudson's Bay Company Store (heritage site)

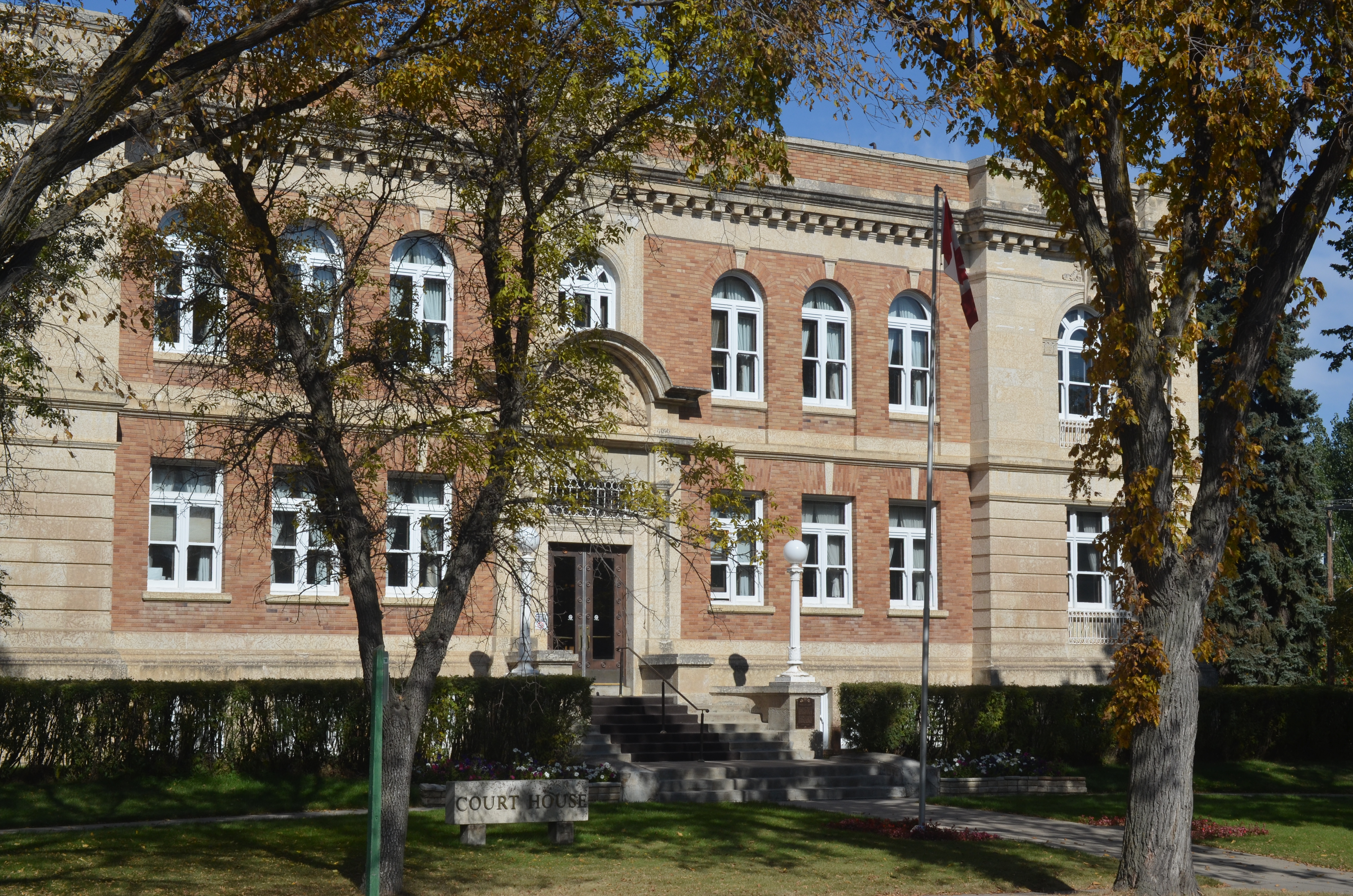
Yorkton Court House (heritage site)

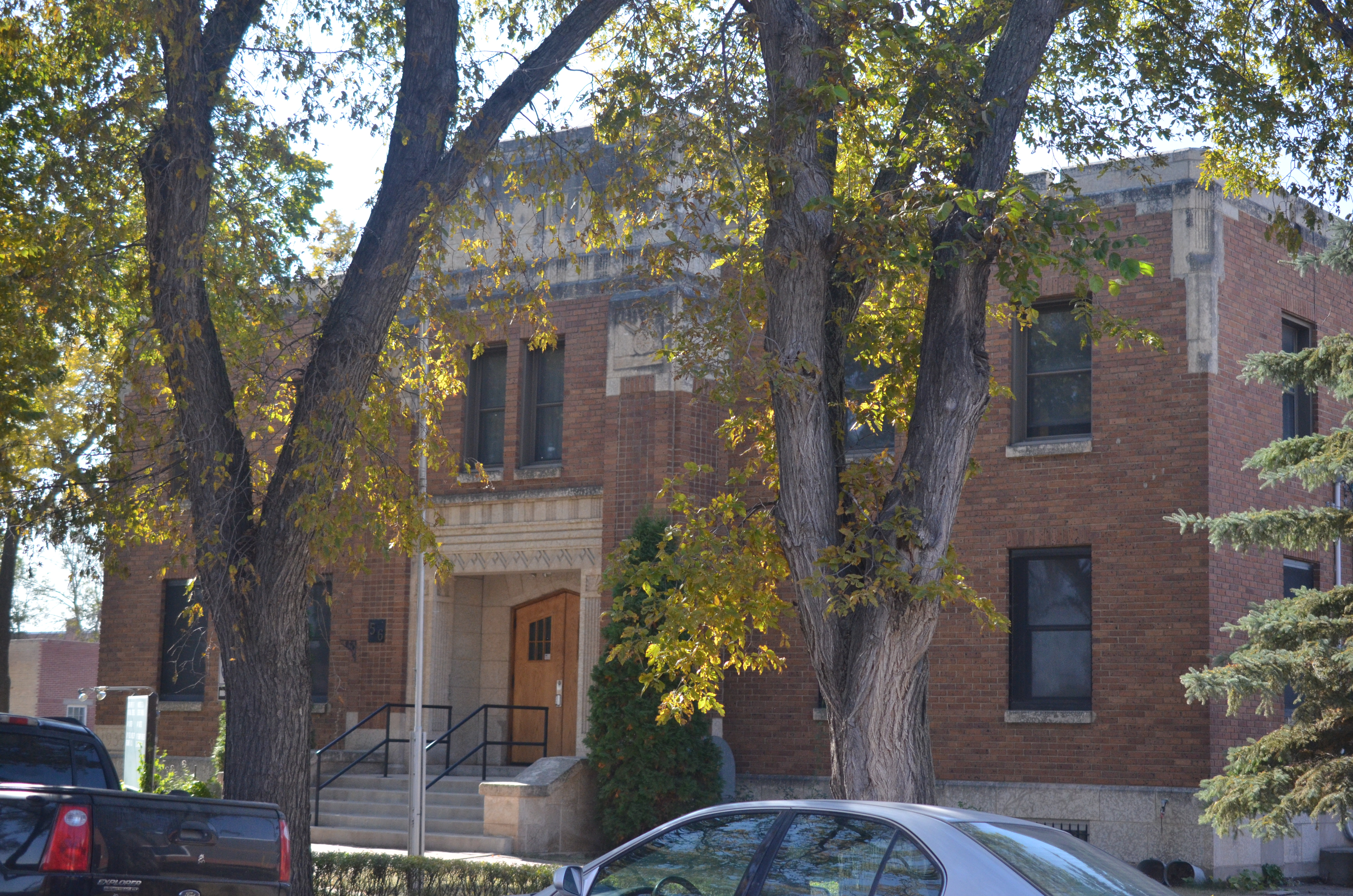
Yorkton Armoury (heritage site)

The Yorkton Gallagher Centre is an entertainment complex constructed in 1977 by the civic government and the Yorkton Exhibition Association. The centre includes an arena, curling rink, conference rooms and an indoor swimming pool. Until 2005, the facility was called the Parkland Agriplex. In the early 1900s an older Agriplex building was located on the fair grounds adjacent to the Gallagher Centre.

Yorkton is home to a branch of the Saskatchewan Western Development Museum, which houses a number of exhibits depicting pioneer life in the town and on the surrounding prairie. The museum includes an early pioneer log home and an extensive outdoor exhibit of agricultural machinery, including early tractors and steam engines.

Located on several buildings in downtown Yorkton are murals depicting historic personalities.

=== Historic sites ===
A number of heritage buildings are located within the city. Yorkton Tower Theatre is a single screen movie theatre built in the 1950s. Army Navy and Air Force Veterans Building, Dulmage Farmstead, Hudson's Bay Company Store, St. Paul's Lutheran Church, Yorkton Armoury, Yorkton Court House, 29 Myrtle Avenue, 81 Second Avenue North, Old Land Titles Building and Yorkton Organic Milling Ltd are also listed historic places.

=== Yorkton Film Festival ===
Film Festivals have been an enduring part of life in Yorkton since the projector spun to life in October 1947. At that time the Yorkton International Documentary Film Festival was born. The international component was dropped in 1977, deciding to focus on Canadian short film instead. The festival renamed itself the Yorkton Short Film Festival also in 1977. In 2009 it became the Yorkton Film Festival.

== Sports ==
The city of Yorkton hosted the 1999 Royal Bank Cup (Junior "A" ice hockey National Championship), the 2006 World Junior A Challenge (an international Junior "A" ice hockey tournament) and the 2009 Canada Cup of Curling.

=== Teams ===
The Yorkton Terriers are a team in the Saskatchewan Junior Hockey League. The Yorkton Rawtec Maulers are a Midget AAA ice hockey team and they are a member of the SMAAAHL. The teams play their games in the 2,300 seat Westland Arena in the Yorkton Gallagher Centre

Yorkton Cardinals were a baseball team playing in the Western Canadian Baseball League.

The Yorkton Bulldogs are a retired box lacrosse team formed in 2003. They are a member of the Prairie Gold Lacrosse League.

== Government ==
=== Municipal ===
The current mayor as of 2024 is Aaron Kienle. He is serving with councillors Dustin Brears, Stephanie Ortynsky, Quinn Haider, Randy Goulden, Greg Litvanyi, and Darcy Zaharia.

=== Provincial ===
The city is located in the Provincial Electoral District of Yorkton. This riding is served in the Legislative Assembly of Saskatchewan by Saskatchewan Party MLA Greg Ottenbreit.

=== Federal ===
The federal constituency of Yorkton—Melville is represented in the House of Commons of Canada by Cathay Wagantall of the Conservative Party of Canada.

From 1968 to 1993, Yorkton was represented federally by New Democratic Party MP Lorne Nystrom who at his first election win was the youngest person to be elected to the Canadian Parliament.

== Infrastructure ==
=== Health care ===
Yorkton established its first hospital in 1902, and this was followed by a maternity care home which lasted a couple of decades. The original hospital was converted into a residential apartment, which in 2014 suffered a large fire which engulfed the entire building. The current hospital, the Yorkton Regional Health Centre, is located on Bradbrooke Drive and is part of the Saskatchewan Health Authority.

=== Transportation ===
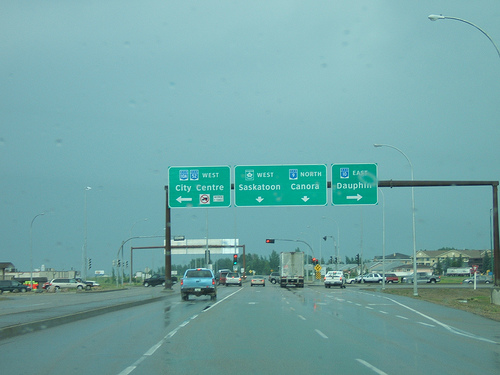
Yellowhead Highway near Yorkton

==== Air ====
During the Second World War an airport was built 2.8 nautical miles (5.2 km; 3.2 mi) north of Yorkton for the Royal Canadian Air Force's No. 11 Service Flying Training School. It is now operated as the Yorkton Municipal Airport (IATA: YQV, ICAO: CYQV).

==== Roads ====
Yorkton is located at the intersection of Hwy 52, Hwy 10, Hwy 9 and The Yellowhead which is part of the Trans-Canada Highway

==== Rail ====
Yorkton is served by Canadian National Railway (JCT Yorkton Sub, Sk. (CN)) branch line and Canadian Pacific Railway (Yorkton IMS, Sk (CPRS)) mainline track.

=== Transit ===
Yorkton Transit runs two routes, covering the majority of the city.

== Education ==
=== Tertiary institutions ===
Parkland College has campuses in Yorkton.

=== High schools ===
Sacred Heart High School was founded by the Sisters Servants of Mary Immaculate, and the school celebrated its 75th anniversary in 1991. Yorkton Regional High School opened November 10, 1967 offering grades 9 to 12.

=== Elementary schools ===
There are four separate Catholic elementary schools. St. Alphonsus Elementary School provides pre-kindergarten through Grade 8. St. Mary's Elementary School offers pre-kindergarten classes to grade 8. St. Michael's Elementary School offers both English and French immersion from Kindergarten to grade 8. St. Paul's Elementary School also belongs to the Christ the Teacher Catholic School Division, and provides Kindergarten to Grade 8 classes.

The public elementary schools are also four in total. Columbia Elementary School has an approximate enrolment of 340 students and offers pre-Kindergarten to Grade 8. Dr. Brass Elementary School is named after the dentist, Dr. David James Brass and offers pre-Kindergarten to Grade 8. M.C. Knoll Elementary School opened in August 1998, and is named after Milton Clifford Knoll. Yorkdale Central School is also a part of Good Spirit School Division No. 204 and offers Kindergarten to Grade 8.

== Military ==
The 64th (Yorkton) Field Battery, Royal Canadian Artillery is garrisoned at the Yorkton Armouries.

During World War II the Yorkton airport was home to No. 23 Elementary Flying Training School and No. 11 Service Flying Training School – both schools being a part of the British Commonwealth Air Training Plan. Among the present users is a Gliding Centre, operated for the Royal Canadian Air Cadets.

The Royal Canadian Air Force Station Yorkton (ADC ID: C-51) was a Long Range Radar (LRR) and Ground Air Transmitter Receiver (GATR) facility of the Pinetree Line. The site was SAGE compatible from day one. The facility which was in use during the Cold War was renamed CFS Yorkton (Canadian Forces Station) in 1967. The station located near Yorkton was operational from 1963 to 1986.

== Media ==
=== Newspapers ===
Weeklies

- The Yorkton News Review (defunct)
- Yorkton This Week

=== Radio ===
Frequency	Call sign	Branding	Format	Owner	Notes
AM 540	CBK (AM)	CBC Radio One	public broadcasting	Canadian Broadcasting Corporation	Clear-channel station broadcasting from Watrous
AM 940	CJGX	GX94	country music	Harvard Broadcasting	
FM 91.7	CBK-FM-3	CBC Music	public broadcasting	Canadian Broadcasting Corporation	Rebroadcaster for CBK-FM
FM 92.9	CJLR-FM-5	MBC Radio	First Nations community radio	Missinipi Broadcasting Corporation	Rebroadcaster for CJLR-FM
FM 94.1	CFGW-FM	Cruz FM	adult hits	Harvard Broadcasting	
FM 98.5	CJJC-FM	98.5 The Rock	Christian music	Dennis M. Dyck	

=== Television ===
Cable television services are supplied by Access Communications. Access is a Saskatchewan-owned not-for-profit co-operative established in 1974. It also supplies home phone and Internet service to the community.

SaskTel provides maxTV and maxTV stream services on both DSL and Fiber. SaskTel is a Crown Corporation owned by the provincial government to serve the people of Saskatchewan with telephone, Internet, and TV services. Current internet speeds are up to 50/10 on DSL and up to 1000/500 on fiber. Business is up to 5000/5000 in select markets.

The only terrestrial television station serving Yorkton is CICC-TV channel 10, a CTV affiliate station.

Yorkton was previously served by CKOS-TV channel 5, a private CBC Television outlet; formerly a sister station of CICC, it became an owned-and-operated repeater of CBKT in 2002, before closing down with the rest of CBC's repeater network in 2012.

== See also ==
- List of communities in Saskatchewan
- List of cities in Saskatchewan
