= Yorkton Bulldogs =

- Founded: 2003
- League: Prairie Gold Lacrosse League
- Based in: Yorkton, Saskatchewan
- Arena: Gallagher Center & Kinsmen Arena
- Colors
- President: Joe Choptuik
- Head coach: Joe Choptuik
- Championships: PGLL Tier 2 (2008 & 2009)

The Yorkton Bulldogs are a Junior B box lacrosse team based out of Yorkton, Saskatchewan. They are a member of the Prairie Gold Lacrosse League.

Founded in 2003, the Bulldogs gain most of their talent from Yorkton Minor Lacrosse, Whitewood and Sturgis, Saskatchewan, where they have a field lacrosse team and program.

== History ==
Scott Marianchuk created the current Yorkton Bulldogs team logo.

Yorkton Bulldogs have won the PGLL Junior Lacrosse Tier 2 championship twice (2008 and 2009).

On January 26, 2009, Bulldogs head coach, Darin Lanigan, resigned from his coaching duties. He was replaced by Joe Choptuik.

2014 was a difficult one for an inexperienced group, going 2-8-2 in the PGLL (sixth of seven teams). The team managed to score a league-low 81 goals in the regular season. Paul Toth led the team in scoring with 24 goals, 6 assists in just 9 league games. Goalie Louden Choptuik played every minute of every game for the Bulldogs, posting a 12.60 GAA.

== Notable players ==
- Chris Lesanko - 2004 PGLL MVP and top scorer. Current PGLL Commissioner.
- Kyle Bazansky - played Senior A with Nanaimo Timbermen (2008) and college lacrosse at Lindenwood University (2009).
