= Aleš Hřebeský Memorial =

The Aleš Hřebeský Memorial is held by Lacrosse Club Custodes Sokol Radotín to honor its former player who died in the autumn of 1993. Today, the Aleš Hřebeský Memorial is the most prestigious box lacrosse event in Europe with teams from 19 countries participating.

== Aleš Hřebeský ==
Aleš Hřebeský was born on July 1, 1972, and was among the most gifted LCC players. Moreover, he was a keen ice hockey player, gymnast, and cycle-ball player. On November 30, 1993, he died of the injuries caused by a drunk driver who hit Aleš while he was waiting at a bus stop.

== History ==
The tournament used to be the traditional opening of the Czech lacrosse season at the end of March. All teams played on a usually muddy field dried with layers of shavings and sawdust.

The 8th tournament in 2001 was breakthrough. Thanks to a generous grant from the Municipality of Prague, and the effort of LCC members, the arena was refurbished and an artificial surface was laid. The Grand Opening was a part of the Aleš Hřebeský Memorial which included a first – teams from abroad (the United States, Germany and even Japan) participated for the first time. It was the first tournament ever in the history of world box lacrosse with participants from more than two countries. The Champion that year was LCC Sokol Radotín. The next year, two American teams participated and a few professional players played on Team Rebel won the tournament in 2002–04. The winner of 2005 and 2006 annual was LC Jižní Město.

In 2007 for the first time a team from the homeland of lacrosse, Canada took part. Green Gaels from Ontario came. Their young team remained unbeaten and gained the trophy. The 2007 annual was also a good preparation for the Czech national team before the World Indoor Lacroose Championship held in Halifax, Nova Scotia, Canada in May 2007. For the first time a lacrosse match was broadcast on TV in the Czech Republic, with Czech TV Sport Channel broadcasting the All Stars Game.

From 2001 to 2004 the main sponsor – HBA – gave the name to the tournament: HBA Cup. The partner of the 2005 annual Memorial was ICV. JIMI-Dlouhý Ltd. was the general partner of the tournament in 2006 and 2007. S&S vzduchotechnika played this role since 2008.

A record number of 16 teams took part in 2008. Also for the first time the tournament started on a Thursday. Several Rebel players including Bill Curtiss who brought the Rebel team as the first overseas team to the tournament appeared in ambitious Megamen Boston. They won the trophy in the first live TV broadcast from the tournament. All matches were available live on the internet at bwin website and you could bet on results there, too. Megamen dominated in 2009 again.

In 2010 an eruption of the Icelandic volcano Eyjafjallajökull stopped the air traffic over Europe just prior to the Memorial, meaning that Megamen, Nova Scotia Privateers and the US Team could not fly over. Canadians Love You to Death and Green Gaels were lucky to get to Radotín and Green Gaels repeated their victory from 2007. Also other players journey from Ireland and England was very adventurous and complicated and the organizers highly appreciated they will to get to Prague for the tournament.

In 2011 the Memorial was the last practice for many players for the World Indoor Lacrosse Championship held in Prague one month later. Jim Veltman, a lacrosse legend, who to Prague as a Czech national team coach, accepted an invitation to play for Love You to Death and lead his team to the champions title, gained in the over-time of a great final against Megamen.

The 20th annual in 2013 hosted a team from Canadian British Columbia for the first time, also French and Israeli lacrosse players took part in combined squad. An entirely Polish team made their debut in the tournament and Scotland was represented as well. Home LCC Radotín celebrated the jubilee tournament with the highers number of teams in history and gained the trophy after 12 years.

In the 21st annual in 2014 there were 20 teams competing, representing 14 nations. For the very first time a native Iroquois team – Kahnawake Rapids – took part in the tournament with several Iroquois national team players in their squad. In a very competitive tournament they stayed undefeated and gained the trophy.

The highest possible number of teams – 21 – arrived in 2015. There were three newcomers: Regina Heat from Saskatchewan, Canada, and new countries represented – Sweden and Turkey. Pioneers reached the title in their third visit to Radotín.

The 23rd annual welcomed a new team from Switzerland. Another newcomer – Team Alberta – gained the tournament trophy in the breathtaking final game against home Custodes. Albertans won in the sudden death overtime.

In April 2024, 24 teams representing 19 countries will be competing.

== Champions ==
Year	(gold) Gold	(silver) Silver	(bronze) Bronze
1994	LCC Radotín		
1995	LCC Radotín		
1996	TJ Malešice		
1997	LCC Radotín		
1998	LCC Radotín		
1999	LCC Radotín		
2000	LCC Radotín		
2001	LCC Radotín		
2002	Rebels		
2003	Rebels		
2004	Rebels		
2005	LC Jižní Město	LCC Radotín	
2006	LC Jižní Město	LCC Radotín	
2007	Green Gaels	LCC Radotín	
2008	Megamen LC	LC Jižní Město	Adanac Warriors
2009	Megamen LC	LC Jižní Město	
2010	Green Gaels	LCC Radotín	LC Jižní Město
2011	Love You To Death	Megamen LC	LCC Radotín
2012	Megamen LC	LCC Radotín	Privateers (NSSLL)
2013	LCC Radotín	Megamen LC	Green Gaels
2014	Kahnawake Rapids	Green Gaels	LCC Radotín
2015	Pioneers	Green Gaels	LCC Radotín
2016	Team Alberta	LCC Radotín	Green Gaels
2017	LCC Radotín	Glasgow Clydesiders	Pioneers
2018	Tel Aviv LC	Nova Scotia Privateers	LCC Radotín
2019	Glasgow Clydesiders	Tel Aviv LC	Megamen LC
2020	Alberta Warriors	Riggers	Glasgow Clydesiders
2022	LCC Radotín	Glasgow Clydesiders	Turku Titans
2023	Nova Scotia Privateers	LCC Radotín	Glasgow Clydesiders
2024	Nova Scotia Privateers	LCC Radotín	Alberta Lacrosse
2025	Victoria Leprechauns	Nova Scotia Privateers	Alberta Lacrosse
