= Regina Rifles =

Canadian lacrosse team

- Founded: 2010
- League: Prairie Gold Lacrosse League
- Based in: Regina, Saskatchewan
- Arena: Co-operators Centre
- Colours: Navy Blue, Lime and White
- Head coach: Don Larson & Bob Frei

The Regina Rifles are a Junior B box lacrosse team based in Regina, Saskatchewan, playing in the top league in Saskatchewan, the Prairie Gold Lacrosse League. The expansion team entered the Saskatchewan Major Box Lacrosse League (later became PGLL) in 2010.

== History ==
The Rifles joined the Regina Riot as the second Junior B team from Regina. The Rifles are operated and managed by the Queen City Minor Box Lacrosse Association in Regina. Their home arena is the Co-operators Centre.

The Rifles won their first-ever game in the Prairie Gold Lacrosse League, 11-5 over the Assiniboia Attack. The first goal scored by a Rifles player was in exhibition play by Brett Kealey. The first hat trick by a Rifle player was scored by Taylor Frei, who went on to win the team goal-scoring title and the PGLL league goal scoring title during the Rifles inaugural season. The Rifles surprised the league by finishing with a .500 season and tied for fifth overall in the standings.

== Season-by-season ==
Season	W	L	T	Finish	Playoff Result
2010	5	5	0	5th (tied) of 9	DNQ
2011	2	6	2	6th of 8	DNQ
2012	7	2	1	2nd of 8	Runner-up (lost to Regina Riot)
2013	7	3	0	2nd of 8	Champions (defeated Saskatoon Smash)
2014	11	1	0	1st of 7	Runner-up (lost to Saskatoon Smash)
2015	7	5	0	2nd of 4	Runner-up (lost to Regina Riot)
2016	7	1	0	1st (tie) of 5	Champions (defeated Regina Riot)
