= InnovationPlex =

Indoor arena in Swift Current, Saskatchewan

Coordinates: 50.286652°N 107.7715°W

Innovation Credit Union iPlex
- Location within Saskatchewan Location within Canada
- Former names: Centennial Civic Centre (1967–2008); Innovation Credit Union iPlex (2008-2022)
- Location: 2001 Chaplin Street East; Swift Current, Saskatchewan; S9H 5A8
- Owner: City of Swift Current
- Operator: City of Swift Current
- Capacity: Ice hockey: 2,879 (3,239 with standing room)
- Surface: Hockey

Construction
- Groundbreaking: April 5, 1965
- Opened: January 24, 1967
- Expanded: 2007–2008
- Cost: C$750,000 ($6.8 million in 2025 dollars)
- Architect: R. B. Ramsay
- General contractors: Rittinger Construction Company, Ltd.

Tenants
- Swift Current Broncos (WHL) (1967–1974, 1986–present); Swift Current Rampage (PGLL) (2003–present); Swift Current Broncos/Indians (SJHL) (1974-1986); Swift Current Legionnaires (SMAAAHL)

The InnovationPlex is a 2,879-seat multi-purpose arena in Swift Current, Saskatchewan, Canada. The arena was built in 1967 as a Canadian Centennial project and originally known as the Centennial Civic Centre. In 2007, Swift Current city council approved a $14 million expansion to the Centennial Civic Centre. Construction of the hockey-curling complex was completed in fall 2007.

It is home to the Swift Current Broncos ice hockey team, Home Hardware AAA Midget Legionnaires ice hockey team, and Swift Current Rampage lacrosse team. It hosted the 2010 World Women's Curling Championship as well as the 2016 Ford World Women's Curling Championship. The naming rights are held by Innovation Credit Union.
