= Prairie Gold Lacrosse League =

Junior league in Saskatchewan, Canada

- PGLL
- Sport: Box lacrosse
- Founded: 2001
- Commissioner: Chris Lesanko
- No. of teams: 5 (Junior); 7 (Senior)
- Country: Canada
- Most recent champions: Junior: Prince Albert Predators (5th title); Senior: Winnipeg Blizzard (1st title)
- Website: prairiegoldlacrosseleague.com

The Prairie Gold Lacrosse League, originally known as the Saskatchewan Major Box Lacrosse League, is a Junior B box lacrosse league in Saskatchewan and Manitoba, Canada.

== History ==
2016 Senior league champion Saskatoon Brewers became the first-ever PGLL team to compete in a Canadian Lacrosse Association national tournament, travelling to Leduc, Alberta to compete at Presidents Cup.

Expansion followed in 2017 with three new teams added in the senior division (Prince Albert Outlaws, Saskatoon Steelers, Saskatoon SWAT). A fourth Saskatoon team, the Plainsmen, were added before the 2018 season.

For the 2018 season the Regina Rifles and Regina Riot programs merged to form the Regina Rampage. The program dissolved after one year and the Rifles returned in 2019.

== Teams ==
Junior Division	Established
Moose Jaw Mustangs	2023*
Prince Albert Predators	2003
Swift Current Wolverines	2019
Weyburn Razorbacks	2024
Winnipeg Blizzard	2026

- * - indicates team returned to league after hiatus

Former Junior teams

- Assinboia Attack (2001–2011)
- Big River Bulldogs (2001–2003)
- Big River Extreme (2003–2006)
- Estevan Big Dogs (2013; 2018–19)
- Moose Jaw Jr. Mustangs (2002–2013; 2016–17)
- Regina Barracuda (2022-2024)
- Regina Chaos (2025)
- Regina Jr. Heat (2001–2006)
- Regina Rifles (2010–2017; 2019) - combined with Riot to form Regina Rampage in 2018
- Regina Riot (2011–2017)
- Saskatoon Smash (2001–2014)
- Saskatoon Steelers (2005–2014; 2017–2022)
- Saskatoon SWAT (2015-2025)
- Standing Buffalo Fighting Sioux (2019-2022)
- Swift Current Rampage (2003–2009)
- Yorkton Bulldogs (2003–2014)

Senior Division	Established
Moose Jaw Mafia	2026
Prince Albert Outlaws	2026*
Regina Heat	2003
Saskatoon Brewers	2005
Saskatoon SWAT	2017
Standing Buffalo Fighting Sioux	2023
Winnipeg Blizzard	2026

Former Senior teams

- Assiniboia Sr. Attack (2011)
- Estevan Impact (2013–2019)
- Meewasin Valley Plainsmen (2018–2019)
- Moose Jaw Chiefs (2014–2019)
- Prince Albert Outlaws (2017-2024)
- Saskatoon Minotaurs (2012)
- Saskatoon Steelers (2019-2022)

== League champions ==
Season	Junior champion	Junior runner-up	Senior champion	Senior runner-up
2001	Saskatoon Smash	no playoffs	---	---
2002	Moose Jaw Mustangs	Saskatoon Smash	---	---
2003	Moose Jaw Mustangs	Saskatoon Smash	---	---
2004	Moose Jaw Mustangs	Yorkton Bulldogs	---	---
2005	Moose Jaw Mustangs	Saskatoon Smash	Regina Heat	Saskatoon Brewers
2006	Moose Jaw Mustangs	Saskatoon Smash	Regina Heat	Saskatoon Brewers
2007	Moose Jaw Mustangs	Saskatoon Steelers	Regina Heat	Saskatoon Brewers
2008	Saskatoon Smash	Prince Albert Predators	Regina Heat	Saskatoon Brewers
2009	Saskatoon Steelers	Regina Riot	Regina Heat	Saskatoon Brewers
2010	Saskatoon Smash	Prince Albert Predators	Regina Heat	Saskatoon Brewers
2011	Saskatoon Smash	Prince Albert Predators	Saskatoon Brewers	Regina Heat
2012	Regina Riot	Regina Rifles	Saskatoon Brewers	Regina Heat
2013	Regina Rifles	Saskatoon Smash	Regina Heat	Estevan Impact
2014	Saskatoon Smash	Regina Rifles	Saskatoon Brewers	Moose Jaw Chiefs
2015	Saskatoon SWAT	Regina Rifles	Moose Jaw Chiefs	Saskatoon Brewers
2016	Regina Rifles	Regina Riot	Saskatoon Brewers	Moose Jaw Chiefs
2017	Regina Rifles	Regina Riot	Saskatoon Brewers	Moose Jaw Chiefs
2018	Prince Albert Predators	Regina Rampage	Saskatoon Brewers	Regina Heat
2019	Standing Buffalo Fighting Sioux	Prince Albert Predators	Saskatoon Brewers	Regina Heat
2022	Saskatoon SWAT	Prince Albert Predators	Saskatoon Brewers	Regina Heat
2023	Prince Albert Predators	Swift Current Wolverines	Saskatoon SWAT	Saskatoon Brewers
2024	Prince Albert Predators	Swift Current Wolverines	Saskatoon Brewers	Standing Buffalo Fighting Sioux
2025	Prince Albert Predators	Moose Jaw Mustangs	Standing Buffalo Fighting Sioux	Saskatoon Brewers
2026	Prince Albert Predators	Swift Current Wolverines	Winnipeg Blizzard	Saskatoon Brewers

== Team records ==
PGLL Record	Team	#	Season(s)
Most Wins (season)	Moose Jaw Mustangs; Prince Albert Predators	14-0; 14-0	2004; 2024
Most Goals (season)	Moose Jaw Mustangs	239	2005 (16 games)
Longest Win-streak	Moose Jaw Mustangs	30	May 2003-August 2004
Longest Unbeaten-streak	Moose Jaw Mustangs	40	June 2002-August 2004

== Individual records ==
PGLL Records	Player	#	Season(s)
Most Goals (game)	Justin Keller, Yorkton Bulldogs	17	2003
Most Assists (game)	Chris Lesanko, Yorkton Bulldogs	18	2003
Most Points (game)	Chris Lesanko, Yorkton Bulldogs	22	2003
Most Goals (season)	Justin Keller, Yorkton Bulldogs	53	2003
Most Assists (season)	Chris Lesanko, Yorkton Bulldogs	63	2003
Most Points (season)	Sam Murphy, Saskatoon Smash	109	2014
Most Goals (career)	Matthew Cudmore, Prince Albert Predators	152	2023-26
Most Assists (career)	Matthew Cudmore, Prince Albert Predators	194	2023-26
Most Points (career)	Matthew Cudmore, Prince Albert Predators	346	2023-26
