= 2020 Champions Cup (curling) =

Grand Slam of Curling event

2020 Humpty's Champions Cup
- Host city: Olds, Alberta
- Arena: Olds Sportsplex
- Dates: April 29 – May 3 (cancelled)

The 2020 Humpty's Champions Cup was scheduled to be held from April 29 to May 3, at the Olds Sportsplex in Olds, Alberta. On March 12, 2020, the event was cancelled due to the COVID-19 pandemic.

The teams that qualified were originally invited to play in the 2021 Champions Cup, providing that three quarters of their team stays intact. However, the 2021 event was changed so that the top 12 teams in the World were invited instead.

== Qualified teams ==
=== Men ===
Qualifying Event	Event	Team	Note
1	2019 Players' Championship	(Alberta) Brendan Bottcher	
2	2019 Humpty's Champions Cup	(Alberta) ~~Brendan Bottcher~~	Already Qualified
3	2018–19 Pinty's Cup	(Alberta) Kevin Koe	
4	2019 Masters	(Saskatchewan) Matt Dunstone	
5	2019 KIOTI Tractor Tour Challenge Tier 1	(Ontario) Brad Jacobs	
6	2019 BOOST National	(Ontario) ~~Brad Jacobs~~	Already Qualified
7	2020 Meridian Canadian Open	(Ontario) ~~Brad Jacobs~~	Already Qualified
8	2019 European Curling Championships	(Sweden) Niklas Edin	
9	2019 Pacific-Asia Curling Championships	(South Korea) Kim Chang-min	
10	2020 Tim Hortons Brier	(Newfoundland and Labrador) Brad Gushue	
11	2020 United States Men's Curling Championship	(United States) John Shuster	
12	2020 World Junior Curling Championships	(Manitoba) Jacques Gauthier	
13	2020 World Men's Curling Championship		
14	WCT Event #1 (2019 Home Hardware Canada Cup)	(Ontario) John Epping	
15	WCT Event #2 (2019 AMJ Campbell Shorty Jenkins Classic)	(Ontario) ~~John Epping~~	Already Qualified
16	WCT Event #3 (2019 Stu Sells Oakville Tankard)	(Ontario) ~~John Epping~~	Already Qualified
17	WCT Event #4 (2019 Ashley HomeStore Curling Classic)	(Alberta) ~~Brendan Bottcher~~	Already Qualified
18	WCT Event #5 (2019 Stu Sells Toronto Tankard)	(Ontario) ~~Brad Jacobs~~	Already Qualified
19	WCT Event #6 (2019 Mercure Perth Masters)	(Scotland) Bruce Mouat	

=== Women ===
Qualifying Event	Event	Team	Note
1	2019 Players' Championship	(Manitoba) Kerri Einarson	
2	2019 Humpty's Champions Cup	(Switzerland) Silvana Tirinzoni	
3	2019 Masters	(Manitoba) Tracy Fleury	
4	2019 KIOTI Tractor Tour Challenge Tier 1	(Sweden) Anna Hasselborg	
5	2019 BOOST National	(Sweden) ~~Anna Hasselborg~~	Already Qualified
6	2020 Meridian Canadian Open	(Sweden) ~~Anna Hasselborg~~	Already Qualified
7	2019 European Curling Championships	(Sweden) ~~Anna Hasselborg~~	Already Qualified
8	2019 Pacific-Asia Curling Championships	(China) Han Yu	
9	2020 Scotties Tournament of Hearts	(Manitoba) ~~Kerri Einarson~~	Already Qualified
10	2020 United States Women's Curling Championship	(United States) Tabitha Peterson	
11	2020 World Junior Curling Championships	(Manitoba) Mackenzie Zacharias	
12	2020 World Women's Curling Championship		
13	WCT Event #1 (2019 Canad Inns Women's Classic)	(Switzerland) Elena Stern	
14	WCT Event #2 (2019 Home Hardware Canada Cup)	(Ontario) Rachel Homan	
15	WCT Event #3 (2019 Curlers Corner Autumn Gold Curling Classic)	(Manitoba) ~~Kerri Einarson~~	Already Qualified
16	WCT Event #4 (2019 AMJ Campbell Shorty Jenkins Classic)	(Manitoba) Jennifer Jones	
17	WCT Event #5 (2019 Cameron's Brewing Oakville Fall Classic)	(Scotland) Eve Muirhead	

=== Men's Teams ===
The teams are listed as follows:

Skip	Third	Second	Lead	Locale
Brendan Bottcher	Darren Moulding	Brad Thiessen	Karrick Martin	Edmonton, Alberta
Matt Dunstone	Braeden Moskowy	Catlin Schneider	Dustin Kidby	Regina, Saskatchewan
Niklas Edin	Oskar Eriksson	Rasmus Wranå	Christoffer Sundgren	Karlstad, Sweden
John Epping	Ryan Fry	Mat Camm	Brent Laing	Toronto, Ontario
Jacques Gauthier	Jordan Peters	Brayden Payette	Zack Bilawka	Winnipeg, Manitoba
Brad Gushue	Mark Nichols	Brett Gallant	Geoff Walker	St. John's, Newfoundland and Labrador
Brad Jacobs	Marc Kennedy	E. J. Harnden	Ryan Harnden	Sault Ste. Marie, Ontario
Kevin Koe	B. J. Neufeld	Colton Flasch	Ben Hebert	Calgary, Alberta
Kim Chang-min	Lee Ki-jeong	Kim Hak-gyun	Lee Ki-bok	Uiseong, South Korea
Bruce Mouat	Grant Hardie	Bobby Lammie	Hammy McMillan Jr.	Edinburgh, Scotland
John Shuster	Chris Plys	Matt Hamilton	John Landsteiner	Duluth, United States

=== Women's Teams ===
The teams are listed as follows:

Skip	Third	Second	Lead	Locale
Kerri Einarson	Val Sweeting	Shannon Birchard	Briane Meilleur	Gimli, Manitoba
Tracy Fleury	Selena Njegovan	Liz Fyfe	Kristin MacCuish	East St. Paul, Manitoba
Han Yu	Zhang Lijun	Jiang Xindi	Zhao Ruiyi	Beijing, China
Anna Hasselborg	Sara McManus	Agnes Knochenhauer	Sofia Mabergs	Sundbyberg, Sweden
Rachel Homan	Emma Miskew	Joanne Courtney	Lisa Weagle	Ottawa, Ontario
Jennifer Jones	Kaitlyn Lawes	Jocelyn Peterman	Dawn McEwen	Winnipeg, Manitoba
Eve Muirhead	Lauren Gray	Jennifer Dodds	Vicky Wright	Stirling, Scotland
Tabitha Peterson	Becca Hamilton	Tara Peterson	Aileen Geving	McFarland, United States
Briar Hürlimann (Fourth)	Elena Stern (Skip)	Lisa Gisler	Céline Koller	Oberwallis, Switzerland
Alina Pätz (Fourth)	Silvana Tirinzoni (Skip)	Esther Neuenschwander	Melanie Barbezat	Aarau, Switzerland
Mackenzie Zacharias	Karlee Burgess	Emily Zacharias	Lauren Lenentine	Altona, Manitoba
