= 2020 Canadian Junior Curling Championships – Men's tournament =

2020 Canadian Junior Curling Championships Men's tournament
- Host city: Langley, British Columbia
- Arena: George Preston Recreation Centre; Langley Curling Centre
- Dates: January 18–26
- Winner: Manitoba 2
- Curling club: Assiniboine CC, Winnipeg, Manitoba
- Skip: Jacques Gauthier
- Third: Jordan Peters
- Second: Brayden Payette
- Lead: Zack Bilawka
- Coach: John Lund
- Finalist: Newfoundland and Labrador (Bruce)

The Men's tournament of the 2020 New Holland Canadian Junior Curling Championships was held from January 18 to 26 at the George Preston Recreation Centre and the Langley Curling Centre.

In the final, Jacques Gauthier and his team of Jordan Peters, Brayden Payette and Zack Bilawka curling out of the Assiniboine Memorial Curling Club in Winnipeg, Manitoba defeated Newfoundland's Daniel Bruce rink 8–6 to make it an all Manitoba sweep in both the men's and women's events.

== Teams ==
The teams are listed as follows:

Province / Territory	Skip	Third	Second	Lead	Alternate	Club(s)
Alberta	Ryan Jacques	Desmond Young	Andrew Gittis	Gabriel Dyck		Saville SC, Edmonton
British Columbia	Hayato Sato	Matthew McCrady	Joshua Miki	Jacob Umbach		Royal City CC, New Westminster
British Columbia (Host)	Johnson Tao	Toby Mills	Connor Kent	Michael Nunn		Richmond CC, Richmond
Manitoba	Brett Walter	Thomas Dunlop	Zachary Wasylik	Lawson Yates		Assiniboine CC, Winnipeg
Manitoba 2	Jacques Gauthier	Jordan Peters	Brayden Payette	Zack Bilawka		Assiniboine CC, Winnipeg
New Brunswick	Liam Marin	Josh Vaughan	Adam Tracy	Dylan MacDonald	Matt Magee	Thistle St. Andrews CC, Saint John
Newfoundland and Labrador	Daniel Bruce	Ryan McNeil Lamswood	Joel Krats	Nathan King		RE/MAX Centre, St. John's
Northern Ontario	Jacob Horgan	Scott Mitchell	Mitchell Cortello	Chase Dusessoy		Curl Sudbury, Sudbury
Northwest Territories	Sawer Kaeser	Tristan MacPherson	Adam Naugler	Garret Minute		Fort Smith C&WSC, Fort Smith
Nova Scotia	Graeme Weagle	Owen Purcell	Jeffrey Meagher	Scott Weagle		Chester CC, Chester
Ontario	Owen Purdy	Josh Leung	Nathan Steele	Colin Schnurr		Cataraqui G&CC, Kingston
Prince Edward Island	Tyler Smith	Ryan Abraham	Jake Flemming	Ryan Lowery		Montague CC, Montague
Quebec	Gregory Cheal	Shawn Thompson	Simon-Olivier Hebert	James Trahan		CC Lennoxville, Lennoxville; CC Valleyfield, Valleyfield; CC Trois-Rivières, Trois-Rivières
Saskatchewan	Rylan Kleiter	Trevor Johnson	Joshua Mattern	Matthieu Taillon		Sutherland CC, Saskatoon

== Round-robin standings ==
Final round-robin standings

Key
Teams to Championship pool
Teams to Tiebreakers

Pool A	Skip	W	L
Saskatchewan	Rylan Kleiter	5	1
Newfoundland and Labrador	Daniel Bruce	5	1
Alberta	Ryan Jacques	3	3
British Columbia	Hayato Sato	3	3
British Columbia (Host)	Johnson Tao	3	3
Ontario	Owen Purdy	2	4
Northwest Territories	Sawer Kaeser	0	6

Pool B	Skip	W	L
Manitoba 2	Jacques Gauthier	5	1
Prince Edward Island	Tyler Smith	5	1
Manitoba	Brett Walter	4	2
Nova Scotia	Graeme Weagle	4	2
Northern Ontario	Jacob Horgan	2	4
Quebec	Gregory Cheal	1	5
New Brunswick	Liam Marin	0	6

== Round-robin results ==
All draw times are listed in Eastern Standard Time (UTC−5:00).

=== Pool A ===
==== Draw 1 ====
Saturday, January 18, 9:00 am

Sheet C	1	2	3	4	5	6	7	8	9	10	Final
Newfoundland and Labrador (Bruce) 🔨	0	1	1	0	1	2	0	1	1	1	8
Alberta (Jacques)	3	0	0	1	0	0	1	0	0	0	5

==== Draw 2 ====
Saturday, January 18, 2:00 pm

Sheet D	1	2	3	4	5	6	7	8	9	10	Final
British Columbia (Sato)	0	0	1	0	0	0	0	1	1	1	4
Ontario (Purdy) 🔨	0	1	0	1	1	0	0	0	0	0	3

Sheet E	1	2	3	4	5	6	7	8	9	10	11	Final
British Columbia Host (Tao)	0	1	0	0	0	3	0	0	2	0	0	6
Newfoundland and Labrador (Bruce) 🔨	0	0	2	0	0	0	2	0	0	2	1	7

==== Draw 3 ====
Saturday, January 18, 7:30 pm

Sheet B	1	2	3	4	5	6	7	8	9	10	Final
Saskatchewan (Kleiter) 🔨	0	2	0	2	0	2	2	0	0	X	8
British Columbia Host (Tao)	0	0	1	0	1	0	0	2	0	X	4

Sheet G	1	2	3	4	5	6	7	8	9	10	Final
Alberta (Jacques)	0	2	0	0	0	0	1	0	1	X	4
Northwest Territories (Kaeser) 🔨	1	0	0	0	0	0	0	1	0	X	2

==== Draw 4 ====
Sunday, January 19, 9:00 am

Sheet A	1	2	3	4	5	6	7	8	9	10	Final
Ontario (Purdy)	0	0	2	0	0	1	0	1	0	X	4
Saskatchewan (Kleiter) 🔨	0	2	0	1	0	0	2	0	2	X	7

Sheet F	1	2	3	4	5	6	7	8	9	10	Final
Northwest Territories (Kaeser)	1	1	0	2	1	1	0	0	0	X	6
British Columbia (Sato) 🔨	0	0	4	0	0	0	2	1	1	X	8

==== Draw 5 ====
Sunday, January 19, 2:00 pm

Sheet F	1	2	3	4	5	6	7	8	9	10	11	Final
Saskatchewan (Kleiter) 🔨	2	0	1	0	0	1	0	1	0	1	0	6
Alberta (Jacques)	0	1	0	2	0	0	1	0	2	0	1	7

Sheet H	1	2	3	4	5	6	7	8	9	10	Final
British Columbia Host (Tao)	0	1	0	0	1	1	0	0	0	X	3
British Columbia (Sato) 🔨	1	0	3	0	0	0	2	1	1	X	8

==== Draw 6 ====
Sunday, January 19, 7:00 pm

Sheet A	1	2	3	4	5	6	7	8	9	10	Final
Northwest Territories (Kaeser)	0	0	0	1	1	0	0	1	0	0	3
British Columbia Host (Tao) 🔨	0	0	1	0	0	1	1	0	1	1	5

Sheet B	1	2	3	4	5	6	7	8	9	10	Final
Ontario (Purdy)	0	0	2	0	2	0	2	1	0	1	8
Newfoundland and Labrador (Bruce) 🔨	1	2	0	1	0	4	0	0	2	0	10

==== Draw 7 ====
Monday, January 20, 9:00 am

Sheet E	1	2	3	4	5	6	7	8	9	10	Final
Alberta (Jacques) 🔨	0	1	0	1	1	0	2	0	0	X	5
Ontario (Purdy)	1	0	2	0	0	1	0	3	1	X	8

==== Draw 8 ====
Monday, January 20, 2:00 pm

Sheet C	1	2	3	4	5	6	7	8	9	10	Final
British Columbia (Sato)	0	0	1	0	0	1	0	1	0	0	3
Saskatchewan (Kleiter) 🔨	0	1	0	0	2	0	1	0	0	2	6

Sheet D	1	2	3	4	5	6	7	8	9	10	Final
Newfoundland and Labrador (Bruce)	0	2	1	0	2	0	0	2	2	0	9
Northwest Territories (Kaeser) 🔨	3	0	0	1	0	1	1	0	0	1	7

==== Draw 9 ====
Monday, January 20, 7:00 pm

Sheet A	1	2	3	4	5	6	7	8	9	10	Final
British Columbia (Sato)	0	0	2	0	3	0	0	1	1	0	7
Newfoundland and Labrador (Bruce) 🔨	2	0	0	2	0	1	1	0	0	4	10

Sheet F	1	2	3	4	5	6	7	8	9	10	Final
Ontario (Purdy) 🔨	1	0	1	0	0	0	0	1	X	X	3
British Columbia Host (Tao)	0	2	0	0	0	2	3	0	X	X	7

==== Draw 10 ====
Tuesday, January 21, 9:00 am

Sheet E	1	2	3	4	5	6	7	8	9	10	Final
Saskatchewan (Kleiter) 🔨	2	0	1	1	3	2	0	0	X	X	9
Northwest Territories (Kaeser)	0	2	0	0	0	0	0	1	X	X	3

==== Draw 11 ====
Tuesday, January 21, 2:00 pm

Sheet C	1	2	3	4	5	6	7	8	9	10	Final
Northwest Territories (Kaeser)	1	0	0	0	1	0	0	0	X	X	2
Ontario (Purdy) 🔨	0	1	2	1	0	0	0	4	X	X	8

Sheet D	1	2	3	4	5	6	7	8	9	10	Final
British Columbia Host (Tao)	0	0	1	0	0	0	2	1	0	1	5
Alberta (Jacques) 🔨	0	1	0	0	0	1	0	0	2	0	4

==== Draw 12 ====
Tuesday, January 21, 7:00 pm

Sheet B	1	2	3	4	5	6	7	8	9	10	Final
Alberta (Jacques)	0	2	0	0	3	0	2	0	1	X	8
British Columbia (Sato) 🔨	2	0	1	0	0	1	0	1	0	X	5

Sheet H	1	2	3	4	5	6	7	8	9	10	Final
Newfoundland and Labrador (Bruce) 🔨	0	1	0	0	1	1	0	0	0	1	4
Saskatchewan (Kleiter)	1	0	1	0	0	0	0	2	1	0	5

=== Pool B ===
==== Draw 1 ====
Saturday, January 18, 9:00 am

Sheet B	1	2	3	4	5	6	7	8	9	10	11	Final
Quebec (Cheal) 🔨	3	2	1	0	0	0	0	2	0	1	0	9
Manitoba 2 (Gauthier)	0	0	0	2	1	1	2	0	3	0	1	10

Sheet H	1	2	3	4	5	6	7	8	9	10	Final
Prince Edward Island (Smith)	1	1	0	0	0	2	0	0	0	1	5
Manitoba (Walter) 🔨	0	0	1	1	1	0	0	0	1	0	4

==== Draw 2 ====
Saturday, January 18, 2:00 pm

Sheet A	1	2	3	4	5	6	7	8	9	10	Final
Northern Ontario (Horgan)	0	0	2	0	0	3	0	0	1	X	6
Quebec (Cheal) 🔨	0	1	0	0	1	0	1	1	0	X	4

Sheet F	1	2	3	4	5	6	7	8	9	10	Final
Manitoba (Walter)	0	0	3	2	0	2	0	2	X	X	9
Nova Scotia (Weagle) 🔨	0	2	0	0	1	0	1	0	X	X	4

==== Draw 3 ====
Saturday, January 18, 7:30 pm

Sheet C	1	2	3	4	5	6	7	8	9	10	Final
New Brunswick (Marin)	0	1	1	0	1	0	0	0	1	0	4
Prince Edward Island (Smith) 🔨	1	0	0	3	0	0	0	2	0	1	7

==== Draw 4 ====
Sunday, January 19, 9:00 am

Sheet D	1	2	3	4	5	6	7	8	9	10	Final
Nova Scotia (Weagle) 🔨	1	0	0	0	2	1	0	0	1	X	5
Northern Ontario (Horgan)	0	1	0	0	0	0	1	1	0	X	3

Sheet E	1	2	3	4	5	6	7	8	9	10	Final
Manitoba 2 (Gauthier)	0	0	2	1	0	2	0	3	1	X	9
New Brunswick (Marin) 🔨	0	1	0	0	3	0	1	0	0	X	5

==== Draw 5 ====
Sunday, January 19, 2:00 pm

Sheet D	1	2	3	4	5	6	7	8	9	10	Final
New Brunswick (Marin)	0	1	0	1	1	0	0	2	0	0	5
Manitoba (Walter) 🔨	0	0	2	0	0	0	2	0	2	1	7

==== Draw 6 ====
Sunday, January 19, 7:00 pm

Sheet G	1	2	3	4	5	6	7	8	9	10	Final
Quebec (Cheal)	0	2	0	0	0	0	0	2	0	X	4
Prince Edward Island (Smith) 🔨	2	0	0	1	3	0	1	0	1	X	8

Sheet H	1	2	3	4	5	6	7	8	9	10	Final
Manitoba 2 (Gauthier) 🔨	0	0	2	0	0	0	0	1	X	X	3
Nova Scotia (Weagle)	0	1	0	2	1	5	2	0	X	X	11

==== Draw 7 ====
Monday, January 20, 9:00 am

Sheet A	1	2	3	4	5	6	7	8	9	10	Final
Manitoba (Walter)	0	0	0	2	0	0	2	0	X	X	4
Manitoba 2 (Gauthier) 🔨	0	2	1	0	2	2	0	2	X	X	9

Sheet B	1	2	3	4	5	6	7	8	9	10	11	Final
Northern Ontario (Horgan) 🔨	2	0	1	0	1	0	2	0	1	0	1	8
New Brunswick (Marin)	0	2	0	0	0	1	0	1	0	3	0	7

Sheet C	1	2	3	4	5	6	7	8	9	10	Final
Nova Scotia (Weagle)	0	0	1	2	0	3	0	1	0	1	8
Quebec (Cheal) 🔨	0	1	0	0	2	0	2	0	1	0	6

==== Draw 8 ====
Monday, January 20, 2:00 pm

Sheet E	1	2	3	4	5	6	7	8	9	10	Final
Prince Edward Island (Smith) 🔨	1	0	0	2	0	0	1	1	0	1	6
Northern Ontario (Horgan)	0	0	1	0	0	3	0	0	1	0	5

==== Draw 9 ====
Monday, January 20, 7:00 pm

Sheet B	1	2	3	4	5	6	7	8	9	10	Final
Prince Edward Island (Smith)	0	1	0	2	0	0	3	0	2	X	8
Nova Scotia (Weagle) 🔨	1	0	1	0	1	0	0	1	0	X	4

Sheet H	1	2	3	4	5	6	7	8	9	10	11	Final
New Brunswick (Marin)	1	0	1	0	1	0	2	0	0	1	0	6
Quebec (Cheal) 🔨	0	1	0	2	0	1	0	2	0	0	1	7

==== Draw 10 ====
Tuesday, January 21, 9:00 am

Sheet A	1	2	3	4	5	6	7	8	9	10	Final
Nova Scotia (Weagle) 🔨	2	1	0	0	1	5	0	2	X	X	11
New Brunswick (Marin)	0	0	0	1	0	0	2	0	X	X	3

Sheet F	1	2	3	4	5	6	7	8	9	10	Final
Northern Ontario (Horgan)	0	0	0	1	1	0	2	0	1	0	5
Manitoba 2 (Gauthier) 🔨	0	2	0	0	0	2	0	2	0	1	7

==== Draw 11 ====
Tuesday, January 21, 2:00 pm

Sheet E	1	2	3	4	5	6	7	8	9	10	Final
Quebec (Cheal)	0	0	1	1	0	1	0	0	0	X	3
Manitoba (Walter) 🔨	1	1	0	0	1	0	0	2	2	X	7

==== Draw 12 ====
Tuesday, January 21, 7:00 pm

Sheet C	1	2	3	4	5	6	7	8	9	10	11	Final
Manitoba (Walter) 🔨	0	1	0	0	0	0	1	1	1	0	1	5
Northern Ontario (Horgan)	1	0	1	1	0	0	0	0	0	1	0	4

Sheet D	1	2	3	4	5	6	7	8	9	10	Final
Manitoba 2 (Gauthier) 🔨	0	3	0	1	0	2	0	2	0	X	8
Prince Edward Island (Smith)	0	0	1	0	2	0	1	0	1	X	5

== Tiebreaker ==
Wednesday, January 22, 9:00 am

Sheet G	1	2	3	4	5	6	7	8	9	10	Final
British Columbia (Sato) 🔨	2	2	0	1	0	2	0	X	X	X	7
British Columbia Host (Tao)	0	0	0	0	1	0	2	X	X	X	3

== Placement round ==
=== Seeding pool ===
==== Standings ====
Final Seeding Pool Standings

Team	Skip	W	L
British Columbia (Host)	Johnson Tao	5	4
Ontario	Owen Purdy	5	4
Northern Ontario	Jacob Horgan	3	6
Northwest Territories	Sawer Kaeser	2	7
Quebec	Gregory Cheal	1	8
New Brunswick	Liam Marin	1	8

==== Draw 14 ====
Wednesday, January 22, 2:00 pm

Sheet A	1	2	3	4	5	6	7	8	9	10	Final
British Columbia Host (Tao)	0	0	1	0	0	0	1	0	0	0	2
Northern Ontario (Horgan) 🔨	0	0	0	1	0	1	0	1	0	2	5

Sheet G	1	2	3	4	5	6	7	8	9	10	Final
Ontario (Purdy) 🔨	2	0	0	0	1	2	0	2	2	X	9
New Brunswick (Marin)	0	1	1	0	0	0	1	0	0	X	3

==== Draw 15 ====
Wednesday, January 22, 7:00 pm

Sheet A	1	2	3	4	5	6	7	8	9	10	Final
New Brunswick (Marin)	2	0	3	2	3	1	0	2	X	X	13
Northwest Territories (Kaeser) 🔨	0	2	0	0	0	0	1	0	X	X	3

Sheet H	1	2	3	4	5	6	7	8	9	10	Final
Quebec (Cheal) 🔨	2	0	1	0	0	1	0	0	0	X	4
British Columbia Host (Tao)	0	1	0	3	1	0	0	1	1	X	7

==== Draw 16 ====
Thursday, January 23, 9:00 am

Sheet E	1	2	3	4	5	6	7	8	9	10	Final
Northern Ontario (Horgan)	0	2	0	0	1	0	0	2	0	X	5
Ontario (Purdy) 🔨	1	0	1	3	0	0	3	0	1	X	9

==== Draw 17 ====
Thursday, January 23, 2:00 pm

Sheet B	1	2	3	4	5	6	7	8	9	10	Final
Ontario (Purdy) 🔨	3	3	0	2	0	2	0	3	X	X	13
Quebec (Cheal)	0	0	1	0	3	0	1	0	X	X	5

Sheet F	1	2	3	4	5	6	7	8	9	10	Final
Northwest Territories (Kaeser)	0	0	0	1	1	1	0	2	0	2	7
Northern Ontario (Horgan) 🔨	2	0	0	0	0	0	2	0	2	0	6

==== Draw 18 ====
Thursday, January 23, 7:00 pm

Sheet C	1	2	3	4	5	6	7	8	9	10	Final
British Columbia Host (Tao)	0	0	4	1	0	0	2	0	0	1	8
New Brunswick (Marin) 🔨	2	2	0	0	2	0	0	1	0	0	7

==== Draw 20 ====
Friday, January 24, 2:00 pm

Sheet E	1	2	3	4	5	6	7	8	9	10	11	Final
Northwest Territories (Kaeser) 🔨	1	0	1	0	1	1	0	0	2	0	1	7
Quebec (Cheal)	0	1	0	1	0	0	2	1	0	1	0	6

=== Championship pool ===
==== Championship pool standings ====
Final Championship Pool Standings

Key
Teams to Playoffs

Province	Skip	W	L
Manitoba 2	Jacques Gauthier	9	1
Newfoundland and Labrador	Daniel Bruce	8	2
Saskatchewan	Rylan Kleiter	7	3
Alberta	Ryan Jacques	6	4
Prince Edward Island	Tyler Smith	6	4
Manitoba	Brett Walter	5	5
Nova Scotia	Graeme Weagle	5	5
British Columbia	Hayato Sato	4	6

==== Draw 14 ====
Wednesday, January 22, 2:00 pm

Sheet B	1	2	3	4	5	6	7	8	9	10	Final
Manitoba 2 (Gauthier) 🔨	2	0	0	0	2	0	3	0	2	1	10
Newfoundland and Labrador (Bruce)	0	1	0	1	0	1	0	3	0	0	6

Sheet D	1	2	3	4	5	6	7	8	9	10	Final
Prince Edward Island (Smith)	0	0	0	2	0	1	2	0	1	0	6
Saskatchewan (Kleiter) 🔨	0	2	1	0	2	0	0	1	0	1	7

==== Draw 15 ====
Wednesday, January 22, 7:00 pm

Sheet D	1	2	3	4	5	6	7	8	9	10	Final
Nova Scotia (Weagle)	0	1	1	0	0	0	1	1	1	0	5
British Columbia (Sato) 🔨	1	0	0	0	1	2	0	0	0	2	6

Sheet E	1	2	3	4	5	6	7	8	9	10	11	Final
Alberta (Jacques)	0	2	0	1	0	2	1	0	2	0	1	9
Manitoba (Walter) 🔨	2	0	1	0	2	0	0	2	0	1	0	8

==== Draw 16 ====
Thursday, January 23, 9:00 am

Sheet A	1	2	3	4	5	6	7	8	9	10	Final
Saskatchewan (Kleiter) 🔨	0	0	2	0	2	0	0	2	0	1	7
Manitoba (Walter)	1	0	0	3	0	1	0	0	1	0	6

Sheet F	1	2	3	4	5	6	7	8	9	10	Final
Newfoundland and Labrador (Bruce) 🔨	1	2	0	0	4	0	1	0	X	X	8
Prince Edward Island (Smith)	0	0	1	0	0	1	0	1	X	X	3

Sheet G	1	2	3	4	5	6	7	8	9	10	Final
British Columbia (Sato)	0	0	0	1	1	0	0	2	0	0	4
Manitoba 2 (Gauthier) 🔨	0	1	0	0	0	0	2	0	0	2	5

==== Draw 17 ====
Thursday, January 23, 2:00 pm

Sheet D	1	2	3	4	5	6	7	8	9	10	Final
Manitoba 2 (Gauthier) 🔨	0	1	1	1	0	2	0	1	0	X	6
Alberta (Jacques)	0	0	0	0	1	0	0	0	1	X	2

Sheet H	1	2	3	4	5	6	7	8	9	10	Final
Newfoundland and Labrador (Bruce) 🔨	1	0	0	1	0	0	0	1	0	2	5
Nova Scotia (Weagle)	0	0	2	0	0	1	0	0	1	0	4

==== Draw 18 ====
Thursday, January 23, 7:00 pm

Sheet A	1	2	3	4	5	6	7	8	9	10	Final
Prince Edward Island (Smith)	0	0	0	1	0	1	0	0	X	X	2
Alberta (Jacques) 🔨	3	3	2	0	2	0	0	0	X	X	10

Sheet B	1	2	3	4	5	6	7	8	9	10	Final
Nova Scotia (Weagle) 🔨	1	1	1	0	1	0	3	0	1	1	9
Saskatchewan (Kleiter)	0	0	0	1	0	3	0	3	0	0	7

Sheet H	1	2	3	4	5	6	7	8	9	10	Final
Manitoba (Walter) 🔨	3	0	3	0	1	0	1	0	3	X	11
British Columbia (Sato)	0	2	0	2	0	1	0	1	0	X	6

==== Draw 19 ====
Friday, January 24, 9:00 am

Sheet C	1	2	3	4	5	6	7	8	9	10	Final
Manitoba (Walter) 🔨	0	0	1	0	4	0	0	0	0	X	5
Newfoundland and Labrador (Bruce)	2	0	0	3	0	2	0	0	1	X	8

Sheet E	1	2	3	4	5	6	7	8	9	10	Final
British Columbia (Sato) 🔨	1	0	1	0	1	0	0	X	X	X	3
Prince Edward Island (Smith)	0	1	0	2	0	3	3	X	X	X	9

Sheet F	1	2	3	4	5	6	7	8	9	10	Final
Saskatchewan (Kleiter) 🔨	1	1	1	0	1	0	0	0	1	0	5
Manitoba 2 (Gauthier)	0	0	0	1	0	3	0	1	0	1	6

Sheet G	1	2	3	4	5	6	7	8	9	10	Final
Alberta (Jacques) 🔨	2	0	1	0	2	1	2	0	1	X	9
Nova Scotia (Weagle)	0	1	0	2	0	0	0	1	0	X	4

== Playoffs ==
Semifinal			Final
			1	Manitoba 2	8
2	Newfoundland and Labrador	9	2	Newfoundland and Labrador	6
3	Saskatchewan	8

=== Semifinal ===
Saturday, January 25, 11:00 am

Sheet C	1	2	3	4	5	6	7	8	9	10	Final
Newfoundland and Labrador (Bruce) 🔨	1	0	0	0	1	2	0	5	0	0	9
Saskatchewan (Kleiter)	0	2	1	0	0	0	1	0	3	1	8

Player percentages
Newfoundland and Labrador		Saskatchewan	
Nathan King	68%	Matthieu Taillon	90%
Joel Krats	84%	Joshua Mattern	84%
Ryan McNeil Lamswood	81%	Trevor Johnson	81%
Daniel Bruce	80%	Rylan Kleiter	76%
Total	79%	Total	83%

=== Final ===
Sunday, January 26, 2:00 pm

Sheet C	1	2	3	4	5	6	7	8	9	10	Final
Manitoba 2 (Gauthier) 🔨	0	1	2	1	0	2	0	2	0	X	8
Newfoundland and Labrador (Bruce)	0	0	0	0	2	0	2	0	2	X	6

Player percentages
Manitoba 2		Newfoundland and Labrador	
Zack Bilawka	99%	Nathan King	79%
Brayden Payette	91%	Joel Krats	63%
Jordan Peters	91%	Ryan McNeil Lamswood	76%
Jacques Gauthier	88%	Daniel Bruce	72%
Total	92%	Total	72%
