= 2025 Viterra Championship =

Manitoba's men's curling championship

- Host city: Portage la Prairie, Manitoba
- Arena: Stride Place
- Dates: February 5–9
- Winner: Team Carruthers
- Curling club: Granite CC, Winnipeg
- Skip: Reid Carruthers
- Third: B.J. Neufeld
- Second: Catlin Schneider
- Lead: Connor Njegovan
- Coach: Rob Meakin
- Finalist: Braden Calvert

The 2025 Viterra Championship, which was also the 100th anniversary of Manitoba's provincial men's curling championship was held from February 5 to 9 at Stride Place in Portage la Prairie, Manitoba. The winning Reid Carruthers rink represented Manitoba at the 2025 Montana's Brier in Kelowna, British Columbia.

This would be the last Manitoba provincial men's curling championship to feature 32 teams and the last to have Viterra as the sponsor.

== Qualification process ==
Qualification method	Berths	Qualifying team(s)
2023–24 CTRS Berth	1	Jordon McDonald
2024–25 CTRS Berth	3	Reid Carruthers; Riley Smith; Brett Walter
MCT Berth	4	Braden Calvert; Sean Grassie; Jace Freeman; Jordan Peters
Berth Bonspiel	1	Ryan Ostrowsky
Brandon Men's Bonspiel	1	Ed Barr
East Qualifier	1	Justin Richter
North Qualifier	1	Grant Brown
South Qualifier #1	3	Ryan Thomson; Jeremy Sundell; Marcus Titchkosky
South Qualifier #2	1	Stefan Gudmundson
West Qualifier #1	4	Sean Boyle; Travis Gregory; Jeff Stewart; Greg Todoruk
West Qualifier #2	3	Cale Dunbar; Steve Irwin; Kelly Marnoch
Winnipeg Qualifier	6	Daniel Birchard; Hayden Forrester; Jacques Gauthier; Thomas McGillivray; Robin Nelson; Devon Wiebe
Manitoba Open	3	Dean Dunstone; Ryan Hyde; Mike Mahon

== Teams ==
The teams are listed as follows:

Skip	Third	Second	Lead	Alternate	Coach	Club
Ed Barr	Rob Van Kommer	Lucas Pedersen	Seth White			Carberry CC
Daniel Birchard	Kelly Fordyce	Brody Moore	Andrew Peck	Paolo Aquila	Kelsey Meger	Pembina CC
Sean Boyle	Brent Boyle	Scott Newton	Mark Kerkowich	Matt Kulbacki		Neepawa CC
Grant Brown	Rylan Young	Brandon Fell	Braxen Huhtala	Tuffy Seguin		Burntwood CC
Braden Calvert	Corey Chambers	Kyle Kurz	Brendan Bilawka			Fort Rouge CC
Reid Carruthers	B.J. Neufeld	Catlin Schneider	Connor Njegovan	Kyle Doering	Rob Meakin	Granite CC
Cale Dunbar	Shanyne MacGranachan	Kyle Sambrook	Chris Campbell	Travis Dunbar	Lorne Sambrook	Brandon CC
Dean Dunstone	Greg Melnichuk	Al Purdy	Paul Janssen	Scott Kidd		Granite CC
Hayden Forrester	Reece Hamm	Cyrus Brandt	Lawson Yates	Jason Yates		Fort Rouge CC
Jace Freeman	Timothy Marin	Nick Senff	Luke Robins		Graham Freeman	Virden CC
Jacques Gauthier	Derek Samagalski	Tanner Lott	Ronald Gauthier			West St. Paul CC
Sean Grassie	Tyler Drews	Jordan Johnson	Rodney Legault	Bryce McEwen	Albert Bazinet	Deer Lodge CC
Travis Gregory	Wes Gregory	Quinn Robins	Riley Willows	Dale Guild		Hamiota CC
Stefan Gudmundson	Terry Gudmundson	Zane Brandt	Gabriel Brandt	Curtis Brandt		Steinbach CC
Ryan Hyde	Kenneth Keeler	Hartley Vanstone	Eric Leduc	Colin Talbot		Portage CC
Steve Irwin	Daley Peters	Travis Taylor	Travis Brooks	Kody Janzen	Shawn Taylor	Brandon CC
Mike Mahon	Blair Smith	Bill Menzies	Kyle Halford	Bob Scales		Granite CC
Kelly Marnoch	Bart Witherspoon	Branden Jorgensen	Brooks Freeman	Justin Reischeck	Dean Smith	Carberry CC
Jordon McDonald	Dallas Burgess	Elias Huminicki	Cam Olafson	William Lyburn		Assiniboine Memorial CC
Thomas McGillivray	Aaron MacDonell	Tim Johnson	Alex Fontaine		Laurie MacDonell	St. Vital CC
Robin Nelson	Mark Franklin	Denis Lavallee	Gary Gumprich	Gary Banner		Granite CC
Ryan Ostrowsky	Tanner Graham	Lucan Van Den Bosch	Roan Hunker		Blaine Malo	Granite CC
Adam Flatt (Fourth)	Jordan Peters (Skip)	Sean Flatt	Emerson Klimpke	Dennis Bohn		Fort Rouge CC
Justin Richter	Kyle Einarson	Jared Litke	Mitch Einarson	Eric Prokopchuk	Kerri Einarson	Beausejour CC
Riley Smith	Nick Curtis	Josh Claeys	Justin Twiss		Pat Carson	East St. Paul CC
Jeff Stewart	Eric Zamrykut	Geoff Trimble	Alan Christison	Trevor Calvert		Gladstone CC
Jeremy Sundell	Elliot Sundell	Paul Sundell	Thomas Huggart			Holland CC
Ryan Thomson	Kyle Peters	Mark Geroges	Evan Gillis			Morden CC
Marcus Titchkosky	Rhilynd Peters	Raphael Malo	Myles Friesen	Logan Hamm	Gord Titchkosky	Morden CC
Greg Todoruk	Darcy Todoruk	Rob Fisher	Terron Stykalo			Dauphin CC
Brett Walter	JT Ryan	Graham McFarlane	Hugh McFarlane			Assiniboine Memorial CC
Devon Wiebe	Julien Leduc	Thomas Dunlop	Zack Bilawka	Brandon Radford		Charleswood CC

== Knockout brackets ==
32 team double knockout with playoff round
Four teams qualify each from A Event and B Event

=== A event ===
First Knockout	Qualifier 1
Thomas McGillivray	6
Daniel Birchard	7
Daniel Birchard	3
Jordon McDonald	9
Jordon McDonald	10
Grant Brown	2
Jordon McDonald	3
Steve Irwin	9
Travis Gregory	3
Steve Irwin	13
Steve Irwin	8
Devon Wiebe	4
Ryan Thomson	2
Devon Wiebe	10

First Knockout	Qualifier 2
Marcus Titchkosky	7
Sean Grassie	9
Sean Grassie	7
Ed Barr	2
Riley Smith	5
Ed Barr	8
Sean Grassie	3
Braden Calvert	8
Robin Nelson	2
Braden Calvert	7
Braden Calvert	8
Cale Dunbar	2
Hayden Forrester	7
Cale Dunbar	9

First Knockout	Qualifier 3
Greg Todoruk	2
Justin Richter	8
Justin Richter	9
Jacques Gauthier	13
Jacques Gauthier	6
Mike Mahon	2
Jacques Gauthier	5
Brett Walter	8
Stefan Gudmundson	4
Brett Walter	9
Brett Walter	10
Jace Freeman	3
Jace Freeman	9
Dean Dunstone	2

First Knockout	Qualifier 4
Ryan Ostrowsky	3
Kelly Marnoch	8
Kelly Marnoch	1
Reid Carruthers	8
Reid Carruthers	11
Sean Boyle	1
Reid Carruthers	10
Jeff Stewart	7
Jeremy Sundell	5
Jordan Peters	13
Jordan Peters	4
Jeff Stewart	7
Jeff Stewart	10
Ryan Hyde	7

=== B event ===
Second Knockout	Qualifier 5
Devon Wiebe	8
Thomas McGillivray	13	Thomas McGillivray	4	Jordon McDonald	5
Grant Brown	6	Devon Wiebe	6	Devon Wiebe	3
Daniel Birchard	5
Daniel Birchard	10
Travis Gregory	4	Ryan Thomson	4
Ryan Thomson	11

Second Knockout	Qualifier 6
Cale Dunbar	4
Marcus Titchkosky	9	Marcus Titchkosky	8	Sean Grassie	6
Riley Smith	6	Marcus Titchkosky	12	Marcus Titchkosky	5
Ed Barr	8
Ed Barr	7
Robin Nelson	3	Hayden Forrester	4
Hayden Forrester	10

Second Knockout	Qualifier 7
Jace Freeman	10
Greg Todoruk	10	Greg Todoruk	1	Jacques Gauthier	8
Mike Mahon	4	Jace Freeman	6	Justin Richter	7
Justin Richter	7
Justin Richter	9
Stefan Gudmundson	3	Dean Dunstone	3
Dean Dunstone	9

Second Knockout	Qualifier 8
Jordan Peters	8
Ryan Ostrowsky	9	Ryan Ostrowsky	4	Jeff Stewart	10
Sean Boyle	5	Jordan Peters	7	Jordan Peters	5
Kelly Marnoch	6
Kelly Marnoch	8
Jeremy Sundell	3	Ryan Hyde	2
Ryan Hyde	10

== Knockout Results ==
All draw times listed in Central Time (UTC−06:00).

=== Draw 1 ===
Wednesday, February 5, 8:30 am

Sheet A	1	2	3	4	5	6	7	8	9	10	Final
Thomas McGillivray	0	4	0	1	1	0	0	0	0	0	6
Daniel Birchard 🔨	2	0	3	0	0	0	0	0	0	2	7

Sheet B	1	2	3	4	5	6	7	8	9	10	Final
Jordon McDonald 🔨	2	2	0	2	1	0	3	X	X	X	10
Grant Brown	0	0	1	0	0	1	0	X	X	X	2

Sheet C	1	2	3	4	5	6	7	8	9	10	Final
Travis Gregory	0	1	0	1	0	1	0	0	X	X	3
Steve Irwin 🔨	2	0	3	0	4	0	0	4	X	X	13

Sheet D	1	2	3	4	5	6	7	8	9	10	Final
Devon Wiebe 🔨	0	0	4	1	2	0	3	X	X	X	10
Ryan Thomson	0	1	0	0	0	1	0	X	X	X	2

Sheet E	1	2	3	4	5	6	7	8	9	10	11	Final
Marcus Titchkosky 🔨	2	0	1	1	0	0	1	0	0	2	0	7
Sean Grassie	0	2	0	0	2	2	0	0	1	0	2	9

=== Draw 2 ===
Wednesday, February 5, 12:15 pm

Sheet A	1	2	3	4	5	6	7	8	9	10	Final
Jacques Gauthier 🔨	0	0	3	0	1	2	0	0	X	X	6
Mike Mahon	0	0	0	1	0	0	0	1	X	X	2

Sheet B	1	2	3	4	5	6	7	8	9	10	Final
Greg Todoruk	0	0	0	0	1	1	0	X	X	X	2
Justin Richter 🔨	0	2	1	3	0	0	2	X	X	X	8

Sheet C	1	2	3	4	5	6	7	8	9	10	Final
Hayden Forrester 🔨	0	3	0	0	1	2	0	1	0	0	7
Cale Dunbar	0	0	1	1	0	0	4	0	2	1	9

Sheet D	1	2	3	4	5	6	7	8	9	10	Final
Robin Nelson	0	0	1	0	0	0	1	0	X	X	2
Braden Calvert 🔨	2	0	0	1	1	1	0	2	X	X	7

Sheet E	1	2	3	4	5	6	7	8	9	10	Final
Riley Smith	0	0	0	1	0	2	0	2	0	X	5
Ed Barr 🔨	1	2	0	0	1	0	1	0	3	X	8

=== Draw 3 ===
Wednesday, February 5, 4:00 pm

Sheet A	1	2	3	4	5	6	7	8	9	10	Final
Jeremy Sundell 🔨	1	0	2	0	0	2	0	X	X	X	5
Jordan Peters	0	5	0	2	2	0	4	X	X	X	13

Sheet B	1	2	3	4	5	6	7	8	9	10	Final
Jace Freeman 🔨	2	1	1	1	2	0	2	X	X	X	9
Dean Dunstone	0	0	0	0	0	2	0	X	X	X	2

Sheet C	1	2	3	4	5	6	7	8	9	10	Final
Ryan Ostrowsky	0	0	1	0	1	0	1	0	X	X	3
Kelly Marnoch 🔨	0	2	0	1	0	3	0	2	X	X	8

Sheet D	1	2	3	4	5	6	7	8	9	10	Final
Sean Boyle	0	0	0	1	0	X	X	X	X	X	1
Reid Carruthers 🔨	2	3	2	0	4	X	X	X	X	X	11

Sheet E	1	2	3	4	5	6	7	8	9	10	Final
Brett Walter 🔨	2	1	0	3	0	2	0	1	X	X	9
Stefan Gudmundson	0	0	1	0	1	0	2	0	X	X	4

=== Draw 4 ===
Wednesday, February 5, 8:15 pm

Sheet A	1	2	3	4	5	6	7	8	9	10	Final
Travis Gregory 🔨	0	0	2	0	1	0	1	0	X	X	4
Ryan Thomson	0	0	0	2	0	6	0	3	X	X	11

Sheet B	1	2	3	4	5	6	7	8	9	10	Final
Robin Nelson 🔨	2	0	0	0	0	1	0	0	X	X	3
Hayden Forrester	0	2	2	1	2	0	0	3	X	X	10

Sheet C	1	2	3	4	5	6	7	8	9	10	Final
Thomas McGillivray	0	2	0	3	0	3	0	1	4	X	13
Grant Brown 🔨	0	0	2	0	2	0	2	0	0	X	6

Sheet D	1	2	3	4	5	6	7	8	9	10	Final
Marcus Titchkosky	0	0	2	0	2	0	0	2	2	1	9
Riley Smith 🔨	0	3	0	0	0	1	2	0	0	0	6

Sheet E	1	2	3	4	5	6	7	8	9	10	Final
Jeff Stewart 🔨	0	1	0	0	0	3	2	0	4	X	10
Ryan Hyde	0	0	1	1	3	0	0	2	0	X	7

=== Draw 5 ===
Thursday, February 6, 8:30 am

Sheet A	1	2	3	4	5	6	7	8	9	10	Final
Stefan Gudmundson 🔨	0	0	0	2	0	0	1	0	0	X	3
Dean Dunstone	0	1	1	0	3	1	0	2	1	X	9

Sheet B	1	2	3	4	5	6	7	8	9	10	Final
Cale Dunbar	0	1	0	0	0	0	1	0	X	X	2
Braden Calvert 🔨	0	0	2	1	1	1	0	3	X	X	8

Sheet C	1	2	3	4	5	6	7	8	9	10	Final
Brett Walter 🔨	0	2	2	0	3	1	2	X	X	X	10
Jace Freeman	0	0	0	3	0	0	0	X	X	X	3

Sheet D	1	2	3	4	5	6	7	8	9	10	Final
Mike Mahon	1	1	1	0	0	1	0	0	0	X	4
Greg Todoruk 🔨	0	0	0	3	3	0	1	1	2	X	10

Sheet E	1	2	3	4	5	6	7	8	9	10	Final
Justin Richter 🔨	1	0	3	0	2	0	3	0	0	0	9
Jacques Gauthier	0	1	0	3	0	2	0	3	2	2	13

=== Draw 6 ===
Thursday, February 6, 12:15 pm

Sheet A	1	2	3	4	5	6	7	8	9	10	Final
Steve Irwin	0	5	0	0	0	0	1	0	1	1	8
Devon Wiebe 🔨	2	0	0	0	1	0	0	1	0	0	4

Sheet B	1	2	3	4	5	6	7	8	9	10	Final
Ed Barr 🔨	0	0	1	0	0	0	1	0	X	X	2
Sean Grassie	0	1	0	2	0	2	0	2	X	X	7

Sheet C	1	2	3	4	5	6	7	8	9	10	Final
Jordan Peters 🔨	0	0	1	1	0	0	1	1	0	X	4
Jeff Stewart	0	0	0	0	2	2	0	0	3	X	7

Sheet D	1	2	3	4	5	6	7	8	9	10	Final
Jordon McDonald	1	0	0	2	3	0	0	3	X	X	9
Daniel Birchard 🔨	0	1	1	0	0	1	0	0	X	X	3

Sheet E	1	2	3	4	5	6	7	8	9	10	Final
Kelly Marnoch	0	0	1	0	0	0	X	X	X	X	1
Reid Carruthers 🔨	3	1	0	0	2	2	X	X	X	X	8

=== Draw 7 ===
Thursday, February 6, 4:00 pm

Sheet A	1	2	3	4	5	6	7	8	9	10	Final
Ryan Ostrowsky	0	1	0	2	1	1	0	0	2	2	9
Sean Boyle 🔨	2	0	1	0	0	0	0	2	0	0	5

Sheet B	1	2	3	4	5	6	7	8	9	10	Final
Justin Richter 🔨	2	1	0	4	0	2	X	X	X	X	9
Dean Dunstone	0	0	1	0	2	0	X	X	X	X	3

Sheet C	1	2	3	4	5	6	7	8	9	10	Final
Marcus Titchkosky 🔨	1	2	0	0	2	0	2	0	1	X	8
Cale Dunbar	0	0	1	1	0	1	0	1	0	X	4

Sheet D	1	2	3	4	5	6	7	8	9	10	Final
Jeremy Sundell	0	0	0	1	0	2	0	0	0	X	3
Ryan Hyde 🔨	2	0	1	0	2	0	1	3	1	X	10

Sheet E	1	2	3	4	5	6	7	8	9	10	Final
Jace Freeman 🔨	2	2	0	3	3	X	X	X	X	X	10
Greg Todoruk	0	0	1	0	0	X	X	X	X	X	1

=== Draw 8 ===
Thursday, February 6, 7:45 pm

Sheet A	1	2	3	4	5	6	7	8	9	10	Final
Ed Barr 🔨	1	1	1	0	0	0	1	2	0	1	7
Hayden Forrester	0	0	0	1	1	1	0	0	1	0	4

Sheet B	1	2	3	4	5	6	7	8	9	10	Final
Devon Wiebe 🔨	0	1	1	0	0	2	2	0	2	X	8
Thomas McGillivray	1	0	0	1	1	0	0	1	0	X	4

Sheet C	1	2	3	4	5	6	7	8	9	10	Final
Kelly Marnoch 🔨	2	0	1	0	1	1	2	1	X	X	8
Ryan Hyde	0	1	0	1	0	0	0	0	X	X	2

Sheet D	1	2	3	4	5	6	7	8	9	10	Final
Jordan Peters 🔨	2	0	1	0	3	0	1	0	1	X	8
Ryan Ostrowsky	0	2	0	1	0	0	0	1	0	X	4

Sheet E	1	2	3	4	5	6	7	8	9	10	Final
Daniel Birchard 🔨	0	1	2	2	0	1	2	0	2	X	10
Ryan Thomson	2	0	0	0	1	0	0	1	0	X	4

=== Draw 9 ===
Friday, February 7, 8:30 am

Sheet A	1	2	3	4	5	6	7	8	9	10	Final
Sean Grassie 🔨	0	0	0	1	0	1	1	0	0	X	3
Braden Calvert	1	1	1	0	2	0	0	2	1	X	8

Sheet B	1	2	3	4	5	6	7	8	9	10	Final
Reid Carruthers 🔨	2	0	2	0	0	2	0	4	0	X	10
Jeff Stewart	0	1	0	2	1	0	2	0	1	X	7

Sheet C	1	2	3	4	5	6	7	8	9	10	Final
Jordon McDonald	1	0	0	1	0	1	0	X	X	X	3
Steve Irwin 🔨	0	0	4	0	3	0	2	X	X	X	9

Sheet D	1	2	3	4	5	6	7	8	9	10	Final
Jacques Gauthier	0	0	1	0	2	0	2	0	0	0	5
Brett Walter 🔨	0	2	0	3	0	1	0	1	0	1	8

=== Draw 10 ===
Friday, February 7, 12:15 pm

Sheet B	1	2	3	4	5	6	7	8	9	10	Final
Jordan Peters	0	2	0	0	2	0	0	1	0	2	7
Kelly Marnoch 🔨	2	0	1	0	0	0	1	0	2	0	6

Sheet C	1	2	3	4	5	6	7	8	9	10	Final
Devon Wiebe	1	0	0	0	0	2	0	1	1	1	6
Daniel Birchard 🔨	0	0	0	1	1	0	3	0	0	0	5

Sheet D	1	2	3	4	5	6	7	8	9	10	Final
Jace Freeman 🔨	0	0	2	0	0	1	1	0	1	1	6
Justin Richter	1	2	0	1	0	0	0	3	0	0	7

Sheet E	1	2	3	4	5	6	7	8	9	10	11	Final
Marcus Titchkosky 🔨	2	0	0	3	0	2	0	0	1	0	4	12
Ed Barr	0	1	0	0	1	0	2	1	0	3	0	8

=== Draw 11 ===
Friday, February 7, 4:00 pm

Sheet A	1	2	3	4	5	6	7	8	9	10	Final
Jeff Stewart 🔨	0	1	0	1	0	1	1	2	0	4	10
Jordan Peters	1	0	1	0	2	0	0	0	1	0	5

Sheet B	1	2	3	4	5	6	7	8	9	10	11	Final
Jacques Gauthier	0	2	0	0	1	0	2	0	0	2	1	8
Justin Richter 🔨	1	0	0	2	0	1	0	0	3	0	0	7

Sheet C	1	2	3	4	5	6	7	8	9	10	11	Final
Sean Grassie 🔨	2	1	0	0	0	0	2	0	0	0	1	6
Marcus Titchkosky	0	0	1	0	1	0	0	1	1	1	0	5

Sheet D	1	2	3	4	5	6	7	8	9	10	Final
Jordon McDonald	1	0	0	1	0	2	0	0	0	1	5
Devon Wiebe 🔨	0	1	0	0	0	0	0	2	0	0	3

== Playoff Round ==
8 team double knockout
Four teams qualify into Championship Round

=== A Bracket ===
First Knockout
Q1	Steve Irwin	4
Q6	Sean Grassie	6
Q2	Braden Calvert	8
Q5	Jordon McDonald	6

Qualifier 1
Q6	Sean Grassie	4
Q2	Braden Calvert	11

First Knockout
Q3	Reid Carruthers	5
Q7	Jacques Gauthier	4
Q4	Brett Walter	7
Q8	Jeff Stewart	6

Qualifier 2
Q3	Reid Carruthers	6
Q4	Brett Walter	9

=== B Bracket ===
Second Knockout			Qualifier 3
			Q3	Reid Carruthers	8
Q1	Steve Irwin	7	Q5	Jordon McDonald	4
Q5	Jordon McDonald	8

Second Knockout			Qualifier 4
			Q6	Sean Grassie	6
Q7	Jacques Gauthier	10	Q7	Jacques Gauthier	3
Q8	Jeff Stewart	3

== Playoff Round results ==
=== Draw 12 ===
Friday, February 7, 7:45 pm

Sheet A	1	2	3	4	5	6	7	8	9	10	Final
Steve Irwin	2	0	0	1	0	0	0	0	1	0	4
Sean Grassie 🔨	0	2	0	0	1	0	0	1	0	2	6

Sheet B	1	2	3	4	5	6	7	8	9	10	Final
Brett Walter 🔨	0	0	0	2	0	0	4	0	0	1	7
Jeff Stewart	0	0	0	0	1	2	0	2	1	0	6

Sheet C	1	2	3	4	5	6	7	8	9	10	Final
Braden Calvert 🔨	2	0	0	2	0	2	0	1	0	1	8
Jordon McDonald	0	1	1	0	2	0	1	0	1	0	6

Sheet D	1	2	3	4	5	6	7	8	9	10	Final
Reid Carruthers 🔨	2	0	0	0	0	0	2	0	0	1	5
Jacques Gauthier	0	1	0	1	0	1	0	1	0	0	4

=== Draw 13 ===
Saturday, February 8, 9:00 am

Sheet A	1	2	3	4	5	6	7	8	9	10	Final
Brett Walter 🔨	1	0	2	0	2	0	2	0	2	X	9
Reid Carruthers	0	1	0	2	0	2	0	1	0	X	6

Sheet B	1	2	3	4	5	6	7	8	9	10	Final
Braden Calvert 🔨	2	0	2	1	0	3	3	X	X	X	11
Sean Grassie	0	1	0	0	3	0	0	X	X	X	4

Sheet C	1	2	3	4	5	6	7	8	9	10	Final
Jacques Gauthier 🔨	2	0	1	1	0	2	1	0	3	X	10
Jeff Stewart	0	1	0	0	2	0	0	0	0	X	3

Sheet D	1	2	3	4	5	6	7	8	9	10	Final
Steve Irwin 🔨	2	0	0	0	3	0	0	1	1	0	7
Jordon McDonald	0	2	1	1	0	2	0	0	0	2	8

=== Draw 14 ===
Saturday, February 8, 1:30 pm

Sheet A	1	2	3	4	5	6	7	8	9	10	Final
Sean Grassie 🔨	1	0	3	0	1	0	0	0	1	X	6
Jacques Gauthier	0	0	0	0	0	1	1	1	0	X	3

Sheet C	1	2	3	4	5	6	7	8	9	10	Final
Reid Carruthers 🔨	1	0	0	2	0	0	3	0	2	X	8
Jordon McDonald	0	1	0	0	0	2	0	1	0	X	4

== Championship Round ==
Page playoff system
1	Braden Calvert	5
2	Brett Walter	4
3	Reid Carruthers	10
4	Sean Grassie	3

Semifinal
2	Brett Walter	5
3	Reid Carruthers	6

Final
1	Braden Calvert	7
3	Reid Carruthers	9

=== 1 vs. 2 ===
Saturday, February 8, 6:00 pm

Sheet C	1	2	3	4	5	6	7	8	9	10	11	Final
Braden Calvert 🔨	0	1	0	0	1	0	0	2	0	0	1	5
Brett Walter	0	0	1	0	0	1	0	0	1	1	0	4

=== 3 vs. 4 ===
Saturday, February 8, 6:00 pm

Sheet D	1	2	3	4	5	6	7	8	9	10	Final
Reid Carruthers 🔨	3	0	0	1	0	3	0	3	X	X	10
Sean Grassie	0	1	0	0	1	0	1	0	X	X	3

=== Semifinal ===
Sunday, February 9, 9:30 am

Sheet C	1	2	3	4	5	6	7	8	9	10	Final
Brett Walter 🔨	0	0	0	2	0	1	1	0	1	0	5
Reid Carruthers	0	1	0	0	2	0	0	2	0	1	6

=== Final ===
Sunday, February 9, 3:00 pm

Sheet C	1	2	3	4	5	6	7	8	9	10	Final
Braden Calvert 🔨	0	0	1	0	2	0	2	0	2	0	7
Reid Carruthers	2	0	0	4	0	1	0	1	0	1	9

2025 Viterra Championship

Reid Carruthers
8th Manitoba Provincial Championship title
