= Curling at the 2019 Canada Winter Games =

2019 Canada Winter Games
- Host city: Red Deer, Alberta
- Arena: Pidherney Curling Centre
- Dates: February 24– March 2
- Men's winner: British Columbia
- Skip: Hayato Sato
- Third: Joshua Miki
- Second: Dawson Ballard
- Lead: Troy Chong
- Finalist: Ontario (Daniel Del Conte)
- Women's winner: Ontario
- Skip: Bella Croisier
- Third: Jamie Smith
- Second: Piper Croisier
- Lead: Lauren Rajala
- Finalist: Manitoba (Hayley Bergman)

Curling at the 2019 Canada Winter Games took place at the Pidherney Curling Centre in Red Deer, Alberta. The event ran from Sunday, February 24, 2019, to Saturday, March 2, 2019.

== Medalists ==
Games	Gold	Silver	Bronze
Men	British Columbia; Hayato Sato; Joshua Miki; Dawson Ballard; Troy Chong	Ontario; Daniel Del Conte; Nyk Moore; Samuel Guilbeault; Vincent Barbon	Manitoba; Graham Loewen; Sean Flatt; Zack Bilawka; Adam Flatt
Women	Ontario; Bella Croisier; Jamie Smith; Piper Croisier; Lauren Rajala	Manitoba; Hayley Bergman; Anastasia Ginters; Payton Bergman; Cheyenne Ehnes	Nova Scotia; Cally Moore; Taylour Stevens; Cassidy Currie; Cate Fitzgerald

== Men ==
=== Teams ===
Team	Skip	Third	Second	Lead	Locale
Alberta	Nathan Molberg	Ben Helston	Nicholas Warkman	Morgan Bilassy	St. Albert CC, St. Albert
British Columbia	Hayato Sato	Joshua Miki	Dawson Ballard	Troy Chong	Royal City CC, New Westminster
Manitoba	Graham Loewen	Sean Flatt	Zack Bilawka	Adam Flatt	St. Vital CC, Winnipeg
New Brunswick	Emmanuel Porter (Fourth)	Alex Peasley (Skip)	Logan Pugsley	Rajan Dalrymple	Gage G&CC, Oromocto
Newfoundland and Labrador	Nathan Young	Sam Follett	Nathan Locke	Ben Stringer	St. John's CC & Re/Max Centre, St. John's
Northwest Territories	Sawer Kaeser	Tristan MacPherson	Garret Minute	Caleb Brake	Fort Smith CC, Fort Smith
Nova Scotia	Ethan Young	Kieran Mackintosh	Chris Churchill	Aden Kavanaugh	Mayflower CC, Halifax
Ontario	Daniel Del Conte	Nyk Moore	Samuel Guilbeault	Vincent Barbon	Hamilton Victoria CC, Hamilton
Prince Edward Island	Mitchell Schut	Nicholas Johnston	Liam Kelly	Colin MacKenzie	Cornwall CC, Cornwall
Quebec	Cedric Maurice	Charles Patton	Mathis Pedneault	Alexis LeBel	CC Laval, Laval
Saskatchewan	Brecklin Gervais	James Hom	Joshua Donais	Andrew Myers	Kronau CC, Kronau

=== Round-robin standings ===
Final round-robin standings

Key
Teams to Playoffs

Team	Skip	W	L
Ontario	Daniel Del Conte	9	1
British Columbia	Hayato Sato	9	1
Newfoundland and Labrador	Nathan Young	7	3
Alberta	Nathan Molberg	7	3
Manitoba	Graham Loewen	6	4
New Brunswick	Emmanuel Porter	5	5
Nova Scotia	Ethan Young	5	5
Saskatchewan	Brecklin Gervais	4	6
Quebec	Cedric Maurice	2	8
Prince Edward Island	Mitchell Schut	1	9
Northwest Territories	Sawer Kaeser	0	10

=== Round-robin results ===
==== Draw 1 ====
Sunday, February 24, 10:00

Sheet 3	1	2	3	4	5	6	7	8	Final
Prince Edward Island (Schut)	0	0	0	1	0	0	0	X	1
Ontario (Del Conte) 🔨	0	2	4	0	0	1	2	X	9

Sheet 5	1	2	3	4	5	6	7	8	Final
Saskatchewan (Gervais)	0	0	2	2	0	3	0	X	7
Northwest Territories (Kaeser) 🔨	0	0	0	0	1	0	1	X	2

Sheet 7	1	2	3	4	5	6	7	8	Final
Quebec (Maurice)	0	1	0	0	0	0	X	X	1
Alberta (Molberg) 🔨	3	0	1	1	1	1	X	X	7

Sheet 9	1	2	3	4	5	6	7	8	9	Final
New Brunswick (Porter) 🔨	1	2	1	0	0	0	1	0	1	6
Nova Scotia (E. Young)	0	0	0	2	1	0	0	2	0	5

Sheet 11	1	2	3	4	5	6	7	8	Final
Manitoba (Loewen) 🔨	0	0	0	1	1	0	1	X	3
Newfoundland and Labrador (N. Young)	0	1	2	0	0	2	0	X	5

==== Draw 2 ====
Sunday, February 24, 17:00

Sheet 3	1	2	3	4	5	6	7	8	Final
Nova Scotia (E. Young) 🔨	0	1	0	2	0	0	3	0	6
Saskatchewan (Gervais)	0	0	4	0	2	1	0	1	8

Sheet 5	1	2	3	4	5	6	7	8	Final
Prince Edward Island (Schut)	0	0	1	1	0	1	0	0	3
Newfoundland and Labrador (N. Young) 🔨	0	2	0	0	2	0	1	2	7

Sheet 7	1	2	3	4	5	6	7	8	Final
Ontario (Del Conte) 🔨	1	0	1	0	2	0	0	1	5
New Brunswick (Porter)	0	1	0	1	0	1	1	0	4

Sheet 9	1	2	3	4	5	6	7	8	Final
Manitoba (Loewen) 🔨	4	0	0	3	2	0	1	X	10
Northwest Territories (Kaeser)	0	2	1	0	0	2	0	X	5

Sheet 11	1	2	3	4	5	6	7	8	Final
British Columbia (Sato)	0	1	1	1	0	0	1	0	4
Quebec (Maurice) 🔨	0	0	0	0	2	0	0	1	3

==== Draw 3 ====
Monday, February 25, 10:00

Sheet 3	1	2	3	4	5	6	7	8	Final
New Brunswick (Porter)	0	1	0	1	0	1	0	X	3
Newfoundland and Labrador (N. Young) 🔨	1	0	2	0	3	0	3	X	9

Sheet 5	1	2	3	4	5	6	7	8	Final
Nova Scotia (E. Young) 🔨	1	2	0	0	0	1	0	1	5
British Columbia (Sato)	0	0	1	1	2	0	2	0	6

Sheet 7	1	2	3	4	5	6	7	8	Final
Prince Edward Island (Schut)	1	0	0	1	0	0	0	X	2
Manitoba (Loewen) 🔨	0	3	2	0	1	1	1	X	8

Sheet 9	1	2	3	4	5	6	7	8	Final
Ontario (Del Conte) 🔨	1	1	1	1	0	1	0	X	5
Saskatchewan (Gervais)	0	0	0	0	2	0	2	X	4

Sheet 11	1	2	3	4	5	6	7	8	Final
Northwest Territories (Kaeser)	1	0	0	0	1	0	0	X	2
Alberta (Molberg) 🔨	0	1	1	2	0	1	1	X	6

==== Draw 4 ====
Monday, February 25, 17:00

Sheet 3	1	2	3	4	5	6	7	8	Final
British Columbia (Sato)	0	1	0	1	0	1	0	X	3
Manitoba (Loewen) 🔨	0	0	2	0	2	0	2	X	6

Sheet 5	1	2	3	4	5	6	7	8	Final
Quebec (Maurice)	0	3	0	0	0	1	0	X	4
New Brunswick (Porter) 🔨	1	0	1	2	1	0	0	X	5

Sheet 7	1	2	3	4	5	6	7	8	Final
Northwest Territories (Kaeser) 🔨	0	1	0	1	1	0	1	0	4
Nova Scotia (E. Young)	1	0	0	0	0	3	0	1	5

Sheet 9	1	2	3	4	5	6	7	8	Final
Newfoundland and Labrador (N. Young)	0	0	2	0	3	0	3	X	8
Alberta (Molberg) 🔨	1	0	0	1	0	1	0	X	3

Sheet 11	1	2	3	4	5	6	7	8	Final
Saskatchewan (Gervais) 🔨	0	0	1	2	0	0	0	2	5
Prince Edward Island (Schut)	0	0	0	0	1	2	1	0	4

==== Draw 5 ====
Tuesday, February 26, 09:00

Sheet 3	1	2	3	4	5	6	7	8	Final
Quebec (Maurice) 🔨	0	0	0	5	3	1	X	X	9
Northwest Territories (Kaeser)	0	1	0	0	0	0	X	X	1

Sheet 5	1	2	3	4	5	6	7	8	9	Final
Alberta (Molberg)	0	0	2	0	1	2	0	0	1	6
Manitoba (Loewen) 🔨	0	1	0	2	0	0	2	0	0	5

Sheet 11	1	2	3	4	5	6	7	8	Final
Nova Scotia (E. Young)	0	2	0	2	1	0	0	X	5
Ontario (Del Conte) 🔨	1	0	3	0	0	2	1	X	7

==== Draw 6 ====
Tuesday, February 26, 14:00

Sheet 7	1	2	3	4	5	6	7	8	Final
Saskatchewan (Gervais)	0	1	0	0	4	0	X	X	5
Newfoundland and Labrador (N. Young) 🔨	2	0	4	0	0	4	X	X	10

Sheet 9	1	2	3	4	5	6	7	8	Final
Prince Edward Island (Schut) 🔨	0	1	0	0	1	0	0	X	2
British Columbia (Sato)	1	0	3	1	0	2	1	X	8

==== Draw 7 ====
Tuesday, February 26, 19:00

Sheet 3	1	2	3	4	5	6	7	8	Final
Alberta (Molberg)	1	2	1	0	2	2	0	X	8
Prince Edward Island (Schut) 🔨	0	0	0	2	0	0	2	X	4

Sheet 5	1	2	3	4	5	6	7	8	Final
Newfoundland and Labrador (N. Young)	0	1	0	0	0	1	1	0	3
Ontario (Del Conte) 🔨	1	0	1	1	0	0	0	1	4

Sheet 7	1	2	3	4	5	6	7	8	Final
British Columbia (Sato) 🔨	2	4	0	3	0	4	X	X	13
Northwest Territories (Kaeser)	0	0	1	0	2	0	X	X	3

Sheet 9	1	2	3	4	5	6	7	8	Final
Nova Scotia (E. Young) 🔨	2	1	1	1	1	1	X	X	7
Quebec (Maurice)	0	0	0	0	0	0	X	X	0

Sheet 11	1	2	3	4	5	6	7	8	Final
New Brunswick (Porter)	0	2	0	0	2	0	0	X	4
Manitoba (Loewen) 🔨	2	0	1	1	0	3	1	X	8

==== Draw 8 ====
Wednesday, February 27, 10:00

Sheet 2	1	2	3	4	5	6	7	8	Final
Ontario (Del Conte)	0	2	0	3	0	1	1	0	7
British Columbia (Sato) 🔨	3	0	4	0	1	0	0	1	9

Sheet 4	1	2	3	4	5	6	7	8	Final
New Brunswick (Porter)	0	1	0	1	0	0	1	0	3
Alberta (Molberg) 🔨	1	0	1	0	2	0	0	1	5

Sheet 6	1	2	3	4	5	6	7	8	Final
Nova Scotia (E. Young)	0	0	1	0	1	1	1	2	6
Prince Edward Island (Schut) 🔨	0	0	0	1	0	0	0	0	1

Sheet 8	1	2	3	4	5	6	7	8	Final
Northwest Territories (Kaeser)	0	1	1	0	0	0	2	0	4
Newfoundland and Labrador (N. Young) 🔨	3	0	0	1	0	1	0	2	7

Sheet 10	1	2	3	4	5	6	7	8	Final
Quebec (Maurice)	1	0	2	0	0	1	0	X	4
Saskatchewan (Gervais) 🔨	0	1	0	2	1	0	4	X	8

==== Draw 9 ====
Wednesday, February 27, 17:00

Sheet 2	1	2	3	4	5	6	7	8	Final
Northwest Territories (Kaeser) 🔨	0	0	2	2	0	0	0	X	4
New Brunswick (Porter)	1	0	0	0	3	2	0	X	6

Sheet 4	1	2	3	4	5	6	7	8	Final
British Columbia (Sato)	0	0	1	0	3	1	1	X	6
Saskatchewan (Gervais) 🔨	0	1	0	2	0	0	0	X	3

Sheet 6	1	2	3	4	5	6	7	8	Final
Manitoba (Loewen)	0	1	0	1	0	0	0	X	2
Ontario (Del Conte) 🔨	0	0	3	0	2	1	2	X	8

Sheet 8	1	2	3	4	5	6	7	8	Final
Quebec (Maurice)	0	1	0	2	1	0	0	1	5
Prince Edward Island (Schut) 🔨	2	0	1	0	0	1	0	0	4

Sheet 10	1	2	3	4	5	6	7	8	Final
Alberta (Molberg) 🔨	0	1	1	0	2	0	1	X	5
Nova Scotia (E. Young)	0	0	0	1	0	1	0	X	2

==== Draw 10 ====
Thursday, February 28, 10:00

Sheet 2	1	2	3	4	5	6	7	8	Final
Manitoba (Loewen) 🔨	1	0	4	1	2	0	X	X	8
Quebec (Maurice)	0	2	0	0	0	1	X	X	3

Sheet 4	1	2	3	4	5	6	7	8	Final
Northwest Territories (Kaeser)	0	0	0	1	0	0	X	X	1
Prince Edward Island (Schut) 🔨	2	2	0	0	2	1	X	X	7

Sheet 6	1	2	3	4	5	6	7	8	Final
New Brunswick (Porter) 🔨	1	0	0	0	0	2	0	1	4
Saskatchewan (Gervais)	0	0	0	1	1	0	0	0	2

Sheet 8	1	2	3	4	5	6	7	8	Final
Alberta (Molberg) 🔨	0	1	0	0	3	0	0	X	4
Ontario (Del Conte)	3	0	2	1	0	2	2	X	10

Sheet 10	1	2	3	4	5	6	7	8	Final
Newfoundland and Labrador (N. Young)	0	0	1	0	1	0	0	X	2
British Columbia (Sato) 🔨	2	0	0	2	0	1	1	X	6

==== Draw 11 ====
Thursday, February 28, 17:00

Sheet 2	1	2	3	4	5	6	7	8	Final
Saskatchewan (Gervais) 🔨	0	1	0	0	0	0	1	X	2
Alberta (Molberg)	0	0	2	0	1	1	0	X	4

Sheet 4	1	2	3	4	5	6	7	8	Final
Manitoba (Loewen)	0	1	0	0	2	0	0	0	3
Nova Scotia (E. Young) 🔨	0	0	1	1	0	2	0	1	5

Sheet 6	1	2	3	4	5	6	7	8	Final
Newfoundland and Labrador (N. Young)	0	0	0	1	0	1	3	X	5
Quebec (Maurice) 🔨	0	1	1	0	1	0	0	X	3

Sheet 8	1	2	3	4	5	6	7	8	Final
British Columbia (Sato) 🔨	0	2	0	0	0	1	1	1	5
New Brunswick (Porter)	0	0	0	0	2	0	0	0	2

Sheet 10	1	2	3	4	5	6	7	8	Final
Ontario (Del Conte) 🔨	1	1	0	1	1	2	1	X	7
Northwest Territories (Kaeser)	0	0	2	0	0	0	0	X	2

==== Draw 12 ====
Friday, March 1, 09:00

Sheet 2	1	2	3	4	5	6	7	8	Final
Newfoundland and Labrador (N. Young)	0	1	0	1	0	1	X	X	3
Nova Scotia (E. Young) 🔨	3	0	4	0	1	0	X	X	8

Sheet 4	1	2	3	4	5	6	7	8	Final
Ontario (Del Conte) 🔨	1	0	2	0	1	1	0	1	6
Quebec (Maurice)	0	1	0	1	0	0	2	0	4

Sheet 6	1	2	3	4	5	6	7	8	Final
Alberta (Molberg) 🔨	0	2	0	2	0	0	1	X	5
British Columbia (Sato)	1	0	1	0	3	2	0	X	7

Sheet 8	1	2	3	4	5	6	7	8	Final
Saskatchewan (Gervais) 🔨	0	1	1	0	1	0	1	0	4
Manitoba (Loewen)	0	0	0	1	0	3	0	1	5

Sheet 10	1	2	3	4	5	6	7	8	Final
Prince Edward Island (Schut)	1	0	0	0	3	0	0	X	4
New Brunswick (Porter) 🔨	0	1	1	1	0	2	2	X	7

=== Playoffs ===
Quarterfinals
3	Newfoundland and Labrador	6
6	New Brunswick	2
4	Alberta	3
5	Manitoba	4

Semifinals
1	Ontario	6
3	Newfoundland and Labrador	3
2	British Columbia	6
5	Manitoba	5

Final
1	Ontario	2
2	British Columbia	7

Bronze Medal Game
3	Newfoundland and Labrador	7
5	Manitoba	8

==== Quarterfinals ====
Friday, March 1, 14:00

Sheet 8	1	2	3	4	5	6	7	8	Final
Newfoundland and Labrador (N. Young) 🔨	0	0	4	1	0	0	1	X	6
New Brunswick (Porter)	0	0	0	0	1	1	0	X	2

Sheet 10	1	2	3	4	5	6	7	8	Final
Alberta (Molberg) 🔨	1	0	0	1	0	0	1	X	3
Manitoba (Loewen)	0	0	1	0	2	1	0	X	4

==== Semifinals ====
Friday, March 1, 19:00

Sheet 8	1	2	3	4	5	6	7	8	Final
Ontario (Del Conte) 🔨	0	1	0	0	1	0	1	3	6
Newfoundland and Labrador (N. Young)	0	0	1	0	0	2	0	0	3

Sheet 10	1	2	3	4	5	6	7	8	9	Final
British Columbia (Sato) 🔨	0	0	0	3	0	0	2	0	1	6
Manitoba (Loewen)	0	1	1	0	1	1	0	1	0	5

==== Bronze Medal Game ====
Saturday, March 2, 10:00

Sheet 7	1	2	3	4	5	6	7	8	Final
Newfoundland and Labrador (N. Young) 🔨	0	0	0	3	3	0	0	1	7
Manitoba (Loewen)	1	5	2	0	0	0	0	0	8

==== Gold Medal Game ====
Saturday, March 2, 10:00

Sheet 11	1	2	3	4	5	6	7	8	Final
Ontario (Del Conte)	0	0	0	0	2	0	0	X	2
British Columbia (Sato) 🔨	2	0	0	0	0	0	5	X	7

=== Final standings ===
Team	Rank
British Columbia	1st place, gold medalist(s)
Ontario	2nd place, silver medalist(s)
Manitoba	3rd place, bronze medalist(s)
Newfoundland and Labrador	4
Alberta	5
New Brunswick	6
Nova Scotia	7
Saskatchewan	8
Quebec	9
Prince Edward Island	10
Northwest Territories	11

== Women ==
=== Teams ===
Team	Skip	Third	Second	Lead	Locale
Alberta	Julia Bakos	Quinn Prodaniuk	Alyssa Nedohin	Julianna MacKenzie	Crestwood CC, Edmonton, North Hill CC, Calgary & Sherwood Park CC, Sherwood Park
British Columbia	Gracelyn Richards	Chanelle Meeres	Keelie Duncan	Bryn Woloshyn	Comox Valley CC, Courtenay
Manitoba	Hayley Bergman	Anastasia Ginters	Payton Bergman	Cheyenne Ehnes	Morris CC, Morris
New Brunswick	Erica Cluff	Ashley Cormier	Deanna MacDonald	Rachel Brewer	Woodstock G&CC, Woodstock
Newfoundland and Labrador	Mackenzie Mitchell	Sarah McNeil Lamswood	Mikayla O'Reilly	Ainsleigh Piercey	RE/MAX Centre, St. John's
Northwest Territories	Tyanna Bain	Pearl Gillis	Mataya Gillis	Adrianna Hendrick	Inuvik CC, Inuvik
Nova Scotia	Cally Moore	Taylour Stevens	Cassidy Currie	Cate Fitzgerald	Mayflower CC, Halifax
Ontario	Bella Croisier	Jamie Smith	Piper Croisier	Lauren Rajala	Idylwylde G&CC, Sudbury
Prince Edward Island	Lauren Ferguson	Katie Shaw	Alexis Burris	Lexie Murray	Cornwall CC, Cornwall
Quebec	Hannah Gargul	Kyra Johnson	Amber Gargul	Amy Upton	Pointe-Claire CC, Pointe-Claire
Saskatchewan	Skylar Ackerman	Madison Johnson	Chantel Hoag	Samantha McLaren	Moose Jaw Ford CC, Moose Jaw

=== Round-robin standings ===
Final round-robin standings

Key
Teams to Playoffs

Team	Skip	W	L
Ontario	Bella Croisier	9	1
Manitoba	Hayley Bergman	8	2
Alberta	Julia Bakos	7	3
Nova Scotia	Cally Moore	6	4
Saskatchewan	Skylar Ackerman	6	4
New Brunswick	Erica Cluff	5	5
Prince Edward Island	Lauren Ferguson	4	6
Newfoundland and Labrador	Mackenzie Mitchell	3	7
Quebec	Hannah Gargul	3	7
British Columbia	Gracelyn Richards	3	7
Northwest Territories	Tyanna Bain	1	9

=== Round-robin results ===
==== Draw 1 ====
Sunday, February 24, 10:00

Sheet 2	1	2	3	4	5	6	7	8	Final
Prince Edward Island (Ferguson)	0	0	1	0	2	0	1	X	4
Ontario (Croisier) 🔨	3	0	0	2	0	2	0	X	7

Sheet 4	1	2	3	4	5	6	7	8	Final
Saskatchewan (Ackerman)	2	2	0	1	1	0	1	X	7
Northwest Territories (Bain) 🔨	0	0	2	0	0	1	0	X	3

Sheet 6	1	2	3	4	5	6	7	8	Final
Quebec (Gargul) 🔨	1	0	0	0	1	1	0	X	3
Alberta (Bakos)	0	2	1	2	0	0	1	X	6

Sheet 8	1	2	3	4	5	6	7	8	Final
New Brunswick (Cluff)	0	0	1	0	3	0	1	0	5
Nova Scotia (Moore) 🔨	1	0	0	3	0	1	0	4	9

Sheet 10	1	2	3	4	5	6	7	8	Final
Manitoba (Bergman) 🔨	2	0	0	1	1	0	0	1	5
Newfoundland and Labrador (Mitchell)	0	1	1	0	0	2	0	0	4

==== Draw 2 ====
Sunday, February 24, 17:00

Sheet 2	1	2	3	4	5	6	7	8	Final
Nova Scotia (Moore)	0	3	0	0	3	0	0	2	8
Saskatchewan (Ackerman) 🔨	1	0	2	0	0	3	1	0	7

Sheet 4	1	2	3	4	5	6	7	8	Final
Prince Edward Island (Ferguson)	0	0	4	0	0	0	0	X	4
Newfoundland and Labrador (Mitchell) 🔨	0	1	0	1	2	1	5	X	10

Sheet 6	1	2	3	4	5	6	7	8	Final
Ontario (Croisier)	0	3	0	0	0	1	3	2	9
New Brunswick (Cluff) 🔨	2	0	2	3	1	0	0	0	8

Sheet 8	1	2	3	4	5	6	7	8	Final
Manitoba (Bergman) 🔨	1	0	4	4	3	X	X	X	12
Northwest Territories (Bain)	0	1	0	0	0	X	X	X	1

Sheet 10	1	2	3	4	5	6	7	8	9	Final
British Columbia (Richards)	0	1	2	0	0	0	0	2	0	5
Quebec (Gargul) 🔨	1	0	0	1	2	0	1	0	3	8

==== Draw 3 ====
Monday, February 25, 10:00

Sheet 2	1	2	3	4	5	6	7	8	Final
New Brunswick (Cluff) 🔨	1	2	0	3	0	1	0	0	7
Newfoundland and Labrador (Mitchell)	0	0	4	0	2	0	1	1	8

Sheet 4	1	2	3	4	5	6	7	8	Final
Nova Scotia (Moore) 🔨	3	0	1	3	0	2	X	X	9
British Columbia (Richards)	0	1	0	0	2	0	X	X	3

Sheet 6	1	2	3	4	5	6	7	8	Final
Prince Edward Island (Ferguson)	0	1	0	0	0	0	2	X	3
Manitoba (Bergman) 🔨	1	0	1	2	1	2	0	X	7

Sheet 8	1	2	3	4	5	6	7	8	Final
Ontario (Croisier) 🔨	0	2	0	2	0	0	4	1	9
Saskatchewan (Ackerman)	1	0	3	0	1	0	0	0	5

Sheet 10	1	2	3	4	5	6	7	8	Final
Northwest Territories (Bain)	0	0	3	0	0	1	0	X	4
Alberta (Bakos) 🔨	2	0	0	4	2	0	5	X	13

==== Draw 4 ====
Monday, February 25, 17:00

Sheet 2	1	2	3	4	5	6	7	8	Final
British Columbia (Richards)	0	0	0	0	0	0	X	X	0
Manitoba (Bergman) 🔨	0	1	4	1	1	3	X	X	10

Sheet 4	1	2	3	4	5	6	7	8	Final
Quebec (Gargul) 🔨	1	0	0	0	2	0	1	0	4
New Brunswick (Cluff)	0	0	1	4	0	0	0	2	7

Sheet 6	1	2	3	4	5	6	7	8	Final
Northwest Territories (Bain)	0	0	2	0	0	1	0	X	3
Nova Scotia (Moore) 🔨	1	1	0	2	1	0	6	X	11

Sheet 8	1	2	3	4	5	6	7	8	Final
Newfoundland and Labrador (Mitchell)	0	0	0	2	0	1	0	X	3
Alberta (Bakos) 🔨	2	0	1	0	2	0	1	X	6

Sheet 10	1	2	3	4	5	6	7	8	Final
Saskatchewan (Ackerman)	0	2	0	0	0	1	0	0	3
Prince Edward Island (Ferguson) 🔨	0	0	1	0	2	0	0	1	4

==== Draw 5 ====
Tuesday, February 26, 09:00

Sheet 2	1	2	3	4	5	6	7	8	Final
Quebec (Gargul) 🔨	0	1	1	1	2	0	4	X	9
Northwest Territories (Bain)	0	0	0	0	0	2	0	X	2

Sheet 4	1	2	3	4	5	6	7	8	Final
Alberta (Bakos) 🔨	0	2	0	0	1	2	0	0	5
Manitoba (Bergman)	1	0	0	1	0	0	1	1	4

==== Draw 6 ====
Tuesday, February 26, 14:00

Sheet 3	1	2	3	4	5	6	7	8	Final
New Brunswick (Cluff) 🔨	2	0	1	0	0	0	0	2	5
Manitoba (Bergman)	0	2	0	1	1	1	1	0	6

Sheet 6	1	2	3	4	5	6	7	8	Final
Saskatchewan (Ackerman) 🔨	0	0	1	0	0	2	0	1	4
Newfoundland and Labrador (Mitchell)	0	0	0	1	2	0	0	0	3

Sheet 8	1	2	3	4	5	6	7	8	Final
Prince Edward Island (Ferguson) 🔨	0	0	0	0	1	0	5	0	6
British Columbia (Richards)	0	2	0	1	0	3	0	1	7

Sheet 11	1	2	3	4	5	6	7	8	Final
Nova Scotia (Moore)	0	0	0	1	0	0	X	X	1
Ontario (Croisier) 🔨	0	1	3	0	3	1	X	X	8

==== Draw 7 ====
Tuesday, February 26, 19:00

Sheet 2	1	2	3	4	5	6	7	8	9	Final
Alberta (Bakos) 🔨	0	2	0	2	0	0	2	0	2	8
Prince Edward Island (Ferguson)	0	0	2	0	1	1	0	2	0	6

Sheet 4	1	2	3	4	5	6	7	8	Final
Newfoundland and Labrador (Mitchell) 🔨	0	0	1	0	0	X	X	X	1
Ontario (Croisier)	0	2	0	4	4	X	X	X	10

Sheet 6	1	2	3	4	5	6	7	8	Final
British Columbia (Richards) 🔨	2	0	3	0	2	1	2	X	10
Northwest Territories (Bain)	0	1	0	1	0	0	0	X	2

Sheet 8	1	2	3	4	5	6	7	8	Final
Nova Scotia (Moore)	0	1	0	2	0	1	0	X	4
Quebec (Gargul) 🔨	2	0	2	0	1	0	2	X	7

==== Draw 8 ====
Wednesday, February 27, 10:00

Sheet 3	1	2	3	4	5	6	7	8	Final
Ontario (Croisier)	2	1	1	0	4	0	3	X	11
British Columbia (Richards) 🔨	0	0	0	2	0	2	0	X	4

Sheet 5	1	2	3	4	5	6	7	8	Final
New Brunswick (Cluff) 🔨	1	1	0	0	1	0	1	1	5
Alberta (Bakos)	0	0	1	1	0	2	0	0	4

Sheet 7	1	2	3	4	5	6	7	8	Final
Nova Scotia (Moore)	0	0	0	1	1	2	1	X	5
Prince Edward Island (Ferguson) 🔨	0	1	0	0	0	0	0	X	1

Sheet 9	1	2	3	4	5	6	7	8	Final
Northwest Territories (Bain)	1	0	1	0	1	3	0	X	6
Newfoundland and Labrador (Mitchell) 🔨	0	2	0	1	0	0	1	X	4

Sheet 11	1	2	3	4	5	6	7	8	Final
Quebec (Gargul)	0	0	0	2	1	0	0	X	3
Saskatchewan (Ackerman) 🔨	0	3	2	0	0	3	2	X	10

==== Draw 9 ====
Wednesday, February 27, 17:00

Sheet 3	1	2	3	4	5	6	7	8	Final
Northwest Territories (Bain)	0	0	1	0	2	0	0	0	3
New Brunswick (Cluff) 🔨	0	1	0	2	0	2	1	2	8

Sheet 5	1	2	3	4	5	6	7	8	Final
British Columbia (Richards) 🔨	1	0	1	0	0	1	0	0	3
Saskatchewan (Ackerman)	0	0	0	3	1	0	0	1	5

Sheet 7	1	2	3	4	5	6	7	8	Final
Manitoba (Bergman)	0	0	1	0	1	3	0	X	5
Ontario (Croisier) 🔨	0	0	0	1	0	0	2	X	3

Sheet 9	1	2	3	4	5	6	7	8	9	Final
Quebec (Gargul)	1	0	1	0	2	1	1	0	0	6
Prince Edward Island (Ferguson) 🔨	0	2	0	1	0	0	0	3	2	8

Sheet 11	1	2	3	4	5	6	7	8	Final
Alberta (Bakos) 🔨	0	1	0	2	0	5	X	X	8
Nova Scotia (Moore)	0	0	1	0	1	0	X	X	2

==== Draw 10 ====
Thursday, February 28, 10:00

Sheet 3	1	2	3	4	5	6	7	8	Final
Manitoba (Bergman) 🔨	1	0	1	1	0	0	0	2	5
Quebec (Gargul)	0	2	0	0	0	0	2	0	4

Sheet 5	1	2	3	4	5	6	7	8	Final
Northwest Territories (Bain) 🔨	0	0	0	0	0	0	X	X	0
Prince Edward Island (Ferguson)	0	0	4	1	2	3	X	X	10

Sheet 7	1	2	3	4	5	6	7	8	Final
New Brunswick (Cluff)	0	4	2	0	1	0	0	X	7
Saskatchewan (Ackerman) 🔨	0	0	0	1	0	1	1	X	3

Sheet 9	1	2	3	4	5	6	7	8	Final
Alberta (Bakos)	1	0	0	2	0	0	2	0	5
Ontario (Croisier) 🔨	0	1	4	0	1	1	0	1	8

Sheet 11	1	2	3	4	5	6	7	8	Final
Newfoundland and Labrador (Mitchell) 🔨	0	1	0	0	0	0	0	X	1
British Columbia (Richards)	0	0	1	0	1	1	1	X	4

==== Draw 11 ====
Thursday, February 28, 17:00

Sheet 3	1	2	3	4	5	6	7	8	Final
Saskatchewan (Ackerman)	0	0	0	2	0	1	0	1	4
Alberta (Bakos) 🔨	0	1	0	0	0	0	2	0	3

Sheet 5	1	2	3	4	5	6	7	8	Final
Manitoba (Bergman) 🔨	1	0	1	3	0	2	0	X	7
Nova Scotia (Moore)	0	0	0	0	2	0	1	X	3

Sheet 7	1	2	3	4	5	6	7	8	Final
Newfoundland and Labrador (Mitchell) 🔨	0	1	0	0	4	1	0	3	9
Quebec (Gargul)	3	0	2	1	0	0	2	0	8

Sheet 9	1	2	3	4	5	6	7	8	Final
British Columbia (Richards) 🔨	0	0	2	0	0	1	0	X	3
New Brunswick (Cluff)	1	0	0	1	2	0	3	X	7

Sheet 11	1	2	3	4	5	6	7	8	Final
Ontario (Croisier) 🔨	0	4	2	3	0	0	X	X	9
Northwest Territories (Bain)	0	0	0	0	0	1	X	X	1

==== Draw 12 ====
Friday, March 1, 09:00

Sheet 3	1	2	3	4	5	6	7	8	Final
Newfoundland and Labrador (Mitchell)	0	0	1	0	0	0	1	X	2
Nova Scotia (Moore) 🔨	1	1	0	1	1	1	0	X	5

Sheet 5	1	2	3	4	5	6	7	8	Final
Ontario (Croisier)	0	1	1	0	2	3	0	X	7
Quebec (Gargul) 🔨	1	0	0	2	0	0	1	X	4

Sheet 7	1	2	3	4	5	6	7	8	Final
Alberta (Bakos) 🔨	0	3	0	1	2	1	X	X	7
British Columbia (Richards)	1	0	0	0	0	0	X	X	1

Sheet 9	1	2	3	4	5	6	7	8	Final
Saskatchewan (Ackerman) 🔨	1	0	1	0	2	0	0	2	6
Manitoba (Bergman)	0	0	0	1	0	2	2	0	5

Sheet 11	1	2	3	4	5	6	7	8	Final
Prince Edward Island (Ferguson)	0	2	0	2	0	2	1	1	8
New Brunswick (Cluff) 🔨	2	0	1	0	2	0	0	0	5

=== Playoffs ===
Quarterfinals
4	Nova Scotia	6
5	Saskatchewan	3
3	Alberta	4
6	New Brunswick	5

Semifinals
1	Ontario	6
4	Nova Scotia	5
2	Manitoba	6
6	New Brunswick	3

Final
1	Ontario	8
2	Manitoba	3

Bronze Medal Game
4	Nova Scotia	8
6	New Brunswick	7

==== Quarterfinals ====
Friday, March 1, 14:00

Sheet 7	1	2	3	4	5	6	7	8	Final
Nova Scotia (Moore) 🔨	1	0	1	1	0	1	2	X	6
Saskatchewan (Ackerman)	0	0	0	0	3	0	0	X	3

Sheet 11	1	2	3	4	5	6	7	8	Final
Alberta (Bakos) 🔨	0	1	0	0	0	3	0	0	4
New Brunswick (Cluff)	0	0	0	1	1	0	2	1	5

==== Semifinals ====
Friday, March 1, 19:00

Sheet 7	1	2	3	4	5	6	7	8	Final
Manitoba (Bergman) 🔨	1	3	0	1	0	1	0	X	6
New Brunswick (Cluff)	0	0	1	0	1	0	1	X	3

Sheet 11	1	2	3	4	5	6	7	8	Final
Ontario (Croisier) 🔨	2	0	0	0	1	0	2	1	6
Nova Scotia (Moore)	0	2	1	1	0	1	0	0	5

==== Bronze Medal Game ====
Saturday, March 2, 10:00

Sheet 8	1	2	3	4	5	6	7	8	9	Final
Nova Scotia (Moore) 🔨	2	0	3	0	2	0	0	0	1	8
New Brunswick (Cluff)	0	1	0	1	0	3	1	1	0	7

==== Gold Medal Game ====
Saturday, March 2, 10:00

Sheet 10	1	2	3	4	5	6	7	8	Final
Ontario (Croisier) 🔨	0	2	0	0	2	4	0	X	8
Manitoba (Bergman)	0	0	0	2	0	0	1	X	3

=== Final standings ===
Team	Rank
Ontario	1st place, gold medalist(s)
Manitoba	2nd place, silver medalist(s)
Nova Scotia	3rd place, bronze medalist(s)
New Brunswick	4
Alberta	5
Saskatchewan	6
Prince Edward Island	7
Newfoundland and Labrador	8
Quebec	9
British Columbia	10
Northwest Territories	11
