= 2020 World Junior Curling Championships =

- Host city: Krasnoyarsk, Russia
- Arena: Crystal Ice Arena
- Dates: February 15–22
- Men's winner: Canada
- Curling club: Assiniboine Memorial Curling Club, Winnipeg, Manitoba
- Skip: Jacques Gauthier
- Third: Jordan Peters
- Second: Brayden Payette
- Lead: Zack Bilawka
- Alternate: Thomas Dunlop
- Coach: John Lund
- Finalist: Switzerland (Marco Hösli)
- Women's winner: Canada
- Curling club: Altona Curling Club, Altona, Manitoba
- Skip: Mackenzie Zacharias
- Third: Karlee Burgess
- Second: Emily Zacharias
- Lead: Lauren Lenentine
- Alternate: Rachel Erickson
- Coach: Sheldon Zacharias
- Finalist: South Korea (Kim Min-ji)

The 2020 World Junior Curling Championships was held from February 15 to 22 at the Crystal Ice Arena in Krasnoyarsk, Russia.

Canada proved to be the best in the field in both events as Jacques Gauthier and Mackenzie Zacharias both won their respective events. Switzerland's Marco Hösli and South Korea's Kim Min-ji won the silver medals and Scotland's James Craik and Russia's Vlada Rumiantseva won the bronze medals.

== Men ==
=== Qualification ===
A total of 10 men's teams competed at the 2020 World Junior Curling Championships. Canada, New Zealand, Norway, Scotland, Switzerland and the United States have earned their spot by finishing in the top 6 at the previous Championship. Germany, Italy and Sweden have qualified through the World Junior-B Curling Championship held in Lohja, Finland. Russia earns a spot for being the hosts.

=== Teams ===
The teams are as follows:

Country	Skip	Third	Second	Lead	Alternate	Coach
Canada	Jacques Gauthier	Jordan Peters	Brayden Payette	Zack Bilawka	Thomas Dunlop	John Lund
Germany	Sixten Totzek	Joshua Sutor	Jan-Luca Häg	Magnus Sutor	Klaudius Harsch	Wolfgang Burba
Italy	Giacomo Colli	Alberto Zisa	Francesco De Zanna	Simone Piffer	Giovanni Gottardi	Diana Gaspari
New Zealand	Anton Hood (Fourth)	Ben Smith	Matthew Neilson (Skip)	Hunter Walker	Jayden Apuwai-Bishop	Nelson Ede
Norway	Eirik Øy	Brage Fagervoll	Johan Herfjord	Martin Bruseth	Ingebrigt Bjørnstad	Haavard Mellem
Russia	Andrey Dudov (Fourth)	Artem Karetnikov (Skip)	Mikhail Vlasenko	Nikolai Lysakov	Ivan Kazachkov	Petr Dron, Anna Trukhina
Scotland	James Craik	Mark Watt	Blair Haswell	Niall Ryder	Angus Bryce	Iain Watt, Nancy Smith (NC)
Sweden	Daniel Magnusson	Robin Ahlberg	Anton Regosa	Sebastian Jones	Rasmus Israelsson	Sebastian Kraupp, Alison Kreviazuk (NC)
Switzerland	Yves Stocker (Fourth)	Marco Hösli (Skip) ^{1}	Felix Eberhard	Marcel Gertsch	Yves Wagenseil ^{1}	Rodger Schmidt, Martin Rios (NC)
United States	Luc Violette	Ben Richardson	Jon Harstad	Graem Fenson	Kevin Tuma	Tyler George

Notes

1. Wagenseil skipped the first four games, and Hösli skipped the remaining five games.

=== Round-robin standings ===
Final round-robin standings

Key
Teams to Playoffs
Teams to relegated to "B" championships

Country	Skip	W	L	W–L	DSC
Scotland	James Craik	7	2	1–0	38.68
Canada	Jacques Gauthier	7	2	0–1	34.23
Germany	Sixten Totzek	6	3	–	46.76
Switzerland	Marco Hösli	5	4	1–1	45.29
Sweden	Daniel Magnusson	5	4	1–1	51.95
Russia	Artem Karetnikov	5	4	1–1	63.76
United States	Luc Violette	4	5	–	35.71
New Zealand	Matthew Neilson	3	6	–	46.41
Italy	Giacomo Colli	2	7	–	83.21
Norway	Eirik Øy	1	8	–	48.32

=== Draw Matrix ===
Team	Canada	Germany	Italy	New Zealand	Norway	Russia	Scotland	Sweden	Switzerland	United States	Record
Canada		8–5	7–2	7–1	9–3	6–1	5–6	7–5	8–3	4–5	7–2
Germany	5–8		9–7	7–2	7–5	10–6	4–5	8–2	4–9	8–5	6–3
Italy	2–7	7–9		7–5	3–7	4–6	5–4	4–5	3–8	7–8	2–7
New Zealand	1–7	2–7	5–7		9–4	8–7	4–8	2–6	7–4	2–8	3–6
Norway	3–9	5–7	7–3	4–9		7–8	2–7	7–8	3–6	3–8	1–8
Russia	1–6	6–10	6–4	7–8	8–7		8–5	6–4	9–10	7–4	5–4
Scotland	6–5	5–4	4–5	8–4	7–2	5–8		7–3	7–2	7–6	7–2
Sweden	3–8	2–8	5–4	6–2	8–7	4–6	3–7		7–3	9–8	5–4
Switzerland	5–7	9–4	8–3	4–7	6–3	10–9	2–7	3–7		7–4	5–4
United States	5–4	5–8	8–7	8–2	8–3	4–7	6–7	8–9	4–7		4–5

=== Round-robin results ===
==== Draw 1 ====
Saturday, February 15, 09:00

Sheet A	1	2	3	4	5	6	7	8	9	10	Final
Canada (Gauthier)	0	0	0	1	1	0	0	1	1	0	4
United States (Violette) 🔨	0	1	1	0	0	2	0	0	0	1	5

Sheet B	1	2	3	4	5	6	7	8	9	10	11	Final
Russia (Karetnikov)	0	1	0	0	2	0	2	1	1	0	0	7
New Zealand (Neilson) 🔨	3	0	2	0	0	1	0	0	0	1	1	8

Sheet C	1	2	3	4	5	6	7	8	9	10	11	Final
Scotland (Craik) 🔨	0	0	1	0	0	1	0	1	1	0	0	4
Italy (Colli)	0	1	0	1	0	0	1	0	0	1	1	5

Sheet D	1	2	3	4	5	6	7	8	9	10	Final
Germany (Totzek)	0	0	0	4	0	0	2	1	0	X	7
Norway (Øy) 🔨	0	1	1	0	1	0	0	0	2	X	5

Sheet E	1	2	3	4	5	6	7	8	9	10	Final
Sweden (Magnusson)	0	1	0	1	2	0	1	1	1	X	7
Switzerland (Wagenseil) 🔨	1	0	1	0	0	1	0	0	0	X	3

==== Draw 2 ====
Saturday, February 15, 19:30

Sheet A	1	2	3	4	5	6	7	8	9	10	Final
New Zealand (Neilson) 🔨	0	1	0	0	0	1	0	X	X	X	2
Germany (Totzek)	0	0	3	1	1	0	2	X	X	X	7

Sheet B	1	2	3	4	5	6	7	8	9	10	Final
United States (Violette) 🔨	1	0	2	3	1	0	1	X	X	X	8
Norway (Øy)	0	2	0	0	0	1	0	X	X	X	3

Sheet C	1	2	3	4	5	6	7	8	9	10	Final
Sweden (Magnusson)	0	0	1	0	2	0	X	X	X	X	3
Canada (Gauthier) 🔨	2	3	0	2	0	1	X	X	X	X	8

Sheet D	1	2	3	4	5	6	7	8	9	10	Final
Switzerland (Wagenseil) 🔨	0	0	2	0	1	0	1	0	4	X	8
Italy (Colli)	0	0	0	1	0	1	0	1	0	X	3

Sheet E	1	2	3	4	5	6	7	8	9	10	Final
Russia (Karetnikov)	0	3	0	1	0	0	2	1	1	X	8
Scotland (Craik) 🔨	2	0	1	0	2	0	0	0	0	X	5

==== Draw 3 ====
Sunday, February 16, 14:00

Sheet A	1	2	3	4	5	6	7	8	9	10	Final
Italy (Colli)	0	2	0	1	0	0	1	0	0	0	4
Russia (Karetnikov) 🔨	0	0	2	0	0	1	0	1	1	1	6

Sheet B	1	2	3	4	5	6	7	8	9	10	Final
Canada (Gauthier) 🔨	2	0	0	0	0	2	1	0	0	2	7
Switzerland (Wagenseil)	0	0	1	1	1	0	0	1	1	0	5

Sheet C	1	2	3	4	5	6	7	8	9	10	Final
United States (Violette) 🔨	2	0	0	0	0	2	0	1	0	X	5
Germany (Totzek)	0	0	2	1	2	0	1	0	2	X	8

Sheet D	1	2	3	4	5	6	7	8	9	10	Final
Scotland (Craik)	0	2	3	1	0	0	1	0	X	X	7
Sweden (Magnusson) 🔨	1	0	0	0	0	2	0	0	X	X	3

Sheet E	1	2	3	4	5	6	7	8	9	10	Final
New Zealand (Neilson) 🔨	0	2	0	1	2	2	0	1	1	X	9
Norway (Øy)	0	0	2	0	0	0	2	0	0	X	4

==== Draw 4 ====
Monday, February 17, 09:00

Sheet A	1	2	3	4	5	6	7	8	9	10	11	Final
Norway (Øy)	0	1	2	0	0	2	0	1	1	0	0	7
Sweden (Magnusson) 🔨	0	0	0	0	4	0	0	0	0	3	1	8

Sheet B	1	2	3	4	5	6	7	8	9	10	Final
Scotland (Craik)	0	1	0	0	2	0	0	2	0	0	5
Germany (Totzek) 🔨	0	0	1	0	0	0	2	0	1	0	4

Sheet C	1	2	3	4	5	6	7	8	9	10	Final
Switzerland (Wagenseil)	0	1	1	0	1	0	0	0	1	X	4
New Zealand (Neilson) 🔨	2	0	0	1	0	2	1	1	0	X	7

Sheet D	1	2	3	4	5	6	7	8	9	10	Final
Italy (Colli)	0	0	0	1	0	0	1	X	X	X	2
Canada (Gauthier) 🔨	2	1	1	0	1	2	0	X	X	X	7

Sheet E	1	2	3	4	5	6	7	8	9	10	Final
United States (Violette) 🔨	2	0	1	0	0	0	0	1	0	X	4
Russia (Karetnikov)	0	2	0	1	0	0	1	0	3	X	7

==== Draw 5 ====
Monday, February 17, 19:00

Sheet A	1	2	3	4	5	6	7	8	9	10	Final
Scotland (Craik) 🔨	1	0	1	1	1	0	0	2	0	2	8
New Zealand (Neilson)	0	1	0	0	0	2	0	0	1	0	4

Sheet B	1	2	3	4	5	6	7	8	9	10	11	Final
Sweden (Magnusson) 🔨	2	0	0	1	1	1	1	0	2	0	1	9
United States (Violette)	0	3	0	0	0	0	0	2	0	3	0	8

Sheet C	1	2	3	4	5	6	7	8	9	10	Final
Canada (Gauthier) 🔨	0	3	0	0	0	3	0	1	2	X	9
Norway (Øy)	0	0	1	1	0	0	1	0	0	X	3

Sheet D	1	2	3	4	5	6	7	8	9	10	11	Final
Russia (Karetnikov)	0	0	1	0	3	2	0	0	3	0	0	9
Switzerland (Hösli) 🔨	1	3	0	1	0	0	1	1	0	2	1	10

Sheet E	1	2	3	4	5	6	7	8	9	10	11	Final
Germany (Totzek)	0	1	0	0	2	0	2	0	2	0	2	9
Italy (Colli) 🔨	1	0	0	2	0	1	0	2	0	1	0	7

==== Draw 6 ====
Tuesday, February 18, 14:00

Sheet A	1	2	3	4	5	6	7	8	9	10	Final
Sweden (Magnusson) 🔨	2	1	1	0	0	0	0	1	0	0	5
Italy (Colli)	0	0	0	1	1	0	0	0	2	0	4

Sheet B	1	2	3	4	5	6	7	8	9	10	Final
New Zealand (Neilson)	0	0	0	1	0	0	0	X	X	X	1
Canada (Gauthier) 🔨	0	0	2	0	3	1	1	X	X	X	7

Sheet C	1	2	3	4	5	6	7	8	9	10	Final
Germany (Totzek)	0	0	2	0	0	1	0	4	0	3	10
Russia (Karetnikov) 🔨	0	1	0	2	1	0	1	0	1	0	6

Sheet D	1	2	3	4	5	6	7	8	9	10	Final
Norway (Øy) 🔨	0	0	0	0	0	2	0	X	X	X	2
Scotland (Craik)	0	1	1	1	2	0	2	X	X	X	7

Sheet E	1	2	3	4	5	6	7	8	9	10	Final
Switzerland (Hösli)	0	1	1	1	0	1	0	0	2	1	7
United States (Violette) 🔨	1	0	0	0	1	0	2	0	0	0	4

==== Draw 7 ====
Wednesday, February 19, 09:00

Sheet A	1	2	3	4	5	6	7	8	9	10	Final
Russia (Karetnikov) 🔨	1	0	0	0	3	0	2	0	2	0	8
Norway (Øy)	0	1	1	1	0	1	0	2	0	1	7

Sheet B	1	2	3	4	5	6	7	8	9	10	Final
Switzerland (Hösli)	0	0	0	1	0	0	1	0	0	X	2
Scotland (Craik) 🔨	2	2	0	0	0	1	0	0	2	X	7

Sheet C	1	2	3	4	5	6	7	8	9	10	Final
Italy (Colli)	0	2	0	3	0	0	0	1	0	1	7
United States (Violette) 🔨	1	0	2	0	2	0	0	0	3	0	8

Sheet D	1	2	3	4	5	6	7	8	9	10	Final
Sweden (Magnusson) 🔨	1	0	1	0	2	0	0	1	1	X	6
New Zealand (Neilson)	0	0	0	1	0	1	0	0	0	X	2

Sheet E	1	2	3	4	5	6	7	8	9	10	Final
Canada (Gauthier)	0	0	0	3	0	3	0	2	0	X	8
Germany (Totzek) 🔨	1	1	1	0	1	0	1	0	0	X	5

==== Draw 8 ====
Wednesday, February 19, 19:00

Sheet A	1	2	3	4	5	6	7	8	9	10	11	Final
United States (Violette)	1	0	0	1	0	2	0	1	0	1	0	6
Scotland (Craik) 🔨	0	1	0	0	2	0	1	0	2	0	1	7

Sheet B	1	2	3	4	5	6	7	8	9	10	Final
Germany (Totzek) 🔨	1	0	2	1	3	1	X	X	X	X	8
Sweden (Magnusson)	0	2	0	0	0	0	X	X	X	X	2

Sheet C	1	2	3	4	5	6	7	8	9	10	Final
Norway (Øy) 🔨	0	1	0	1	0	0	0	1	X	X	3
Switzerland (Hösli)	0	0	1	0	3	1	1	0	X	X	6

Sheet D	1	2	3	4	5	6	7	8	9	10	Final
Canada (Gauthier) 🔨	0	0	1	0	0	2	0	1	2	X	6
Russia (Karetnikov)	0	0	0	0	0	0	1	0	0	X	1

Sheet E	1	2	3	4	5	6	7	8	9	10	Final
Italy (Colli) 🔨	3	0	0	0	3	0	0	1	0	X	7
New Zealand (Neilson)	0	1	0	1	0	1	1	0	1	X	5

==== Draw 9 ====
Thursday, February 20, 14:00

Sheet A	1	2	3	4	5	6	7	8	9	10	Final
Germany (Totzek) 🔨	2	0	0	0	0	0	0	2	0	X	4
Switzerland (Hösli)	0	0	2	0	3	1	1	0	2	X	9

Sheet B	1	2	3	4	5	6	7	8	9	10	Final
Norway (Øy) 🔨	0	1	0	2	0	2	0	2	0	X	7
Italy (Colli)	0	0	0	0	1	0	1	0	1	X	3

Sheet C	1	2	3	4	5	6	7	8	9	10	Final
Russia (Karetnikov) 🔨	1	1	0	1	0	0	1	0	2	X	6
Sweden (Magnusson)	0	0	2	0	0	1	0	1	0	X	4

Sheet D	1	2	3	4	5	6	7	8	9	10	Final
New Zealand (Neilson) 🔨	0	0	1	0	0	1	0	0	0	X	2
United States (Violette)	0	1	0	1	1	0	2	1	2	X	8

Sheet E	1	2	3	4	5	6	7	8	9	10	11	Final
Scotland (Craik)	0	0	2	0	0	0	1	2	0	0	1	6
Canada (Gauthier) 🔨	1	0	0	0	1	1	0	0	0	2	0	5

=== Playoffs ===
Semifinal
1	Scotland	6
4	Switzerland	9
2	Canada	7
3	Germany	4

Final
4	Switzerland	2
2	Canada	7

Bronze-medal game
1	Scotland	6
3	Germany	5

==== Semifinals ====
Friday, February 21, 14:00

Sheet B	1	2	3	4	5	6	7	8	9	10	Final
Scotland (Craik) 🔨	1	0	2	0	0	0	1	0	2	0	6
Switzerland (Hösli)	0	1	0	0	0	3	0	3	0	2	9

Sheet D	1	2	3	4	5	6	7	8	9	10	Final
Canada (Gauthier) 🔨	0	2	0	0	1	0	0	2	0	2	7
Germany (Totzek)	0	0	0	1	0	2	1	0	0	0	4

==== Bronze-medal game ====
Saturday, February 22, 09:00

Sheet A	1	2	3	4	5	6	7	8	9	10	Final
Scotland (Craik) 🔨	0	2	0	0	0	0	3	1	0	0	6
Germany (Totzek)	0	0	0	2	0	1	0	0	2	0	5

==== Final ====
Saturday, February 22, 09:00

Sheet C	1	2	3	4	5	6	7	8	9	10	Final
Switzerland (Hösli)	0	0	0	0	1	0	0	0	1	X	2
Canada (Gauthier) 🔨	0	1	0	1	0	2	2	1	0	X	7

== Women ==
=== Qualification ===
A total of 10 women's teams competed at the 2020 World Junior Curling Championships. The hosts, Russia, were to be joined by the next best six placing nations in 2019: Canada, China, South Korea, Norway, Sweden and Switzerland. However, China did not participate and were replaced by a fourth qualifier from the 'B' Championships. Denmark, Japan, Latvia and Hungary qualified through the World Junior-B Curling Championship held in Lohja, Finland.

=== Teams ===
The teams are as follows:

Country	Skip	Third	Second	Lead	Alternate	Coach
Canada	Mackenzie Zacharias	Karlee Burgess	Emily Zacharias	Lauren Lenentine	Rachel Erickson	Sheldon Zacharias
Denmark	Mathilde Halse	Jasmin Lander	Karolina Jensen	My Larsen	Gabriella Qvist	Mikael Qvist
Hungary	Linda Joo	Dia Regina Dobor	Laura Nagy	Laura Karolina Nagy	Anna Bartalus	Zoltan Jakab, Gyoengy Nagy
Japan	Minori Suzuki (Fourth)	Eri Ogihara	Yui Ueno	Sae Yamamoto (Skip)	Miyu Ueno	Mitsuki Sato
Latvia	Evelīna Barone	Rezija Ievina	Veronika Apse	Erika Patricija Bitmete	Leticija Ievina	Iveta Staša-Šaršūne, Ieva Krusta
Norway	Maia Ramsfjell	Martine Rønning	Mille Haslev Nordbye	Astri Forbregd	Eirin Mesloe	Kai Ove Rønning
Russia	Vlada Rumiantseva	Vera Tiuliakova	Irina Riazanova	Anastasia Mishchenko	Aleksandra Kardapoltseva	Andrey Drozdov, Tatiana Lukina
South Korea	Kim Min-ji	Ha Seung-youn	Kim Hye-rin	Kim Su-jin	Yang Tae-i	Lee Sung-jun
Sweden	Emma Moberg	Rebecka Thunmann	Emma Landelius	Mikaela Altebro	Cecilia Fransson	Flemming Patz, Alison Kreviazuk (NC)
Switzerland	Selina Witschonke	Elena Mathis	Marina Lörtscher	Anna Gut	Sarah Müller	Mirjam Ott, Manuela Netzer (NC)

=== Round-robin standings ===
Final round-robin standings

Key
Teams to Playoffs
Teams to relegated to "B" championships

Country	Skip	W	L	W–L	DSC
South Korea	Kim Min-ji	9	0	–	22.48
Canada	Mackenzie Zacharias	7	2	–	52.33
Russia	Vlada Rumiantseva	6	3	–	52.05
Japan	Sae Yamamoto	5	4	–	61.36
Switzerland	Selina Witschonke	4	5	1–1	40.06
Denmark	Mathilde Halse	4	5	1–1	75.52
Latvia	Evelīna Barone	4	5	1–1	88.21
Norway	Maia Ramsfjell	3	6	1–0	55.78
Sweden	Emma Moberg	3	6	0–1	38.90
Hungary	Linda Joo	0	9	–	92.59

=== Draw Matrix ===
Team	Canada	Denmark	Hungary	Japan	Latvia	Norway	Russia	South Korea	Sweden	Switzerland	Record
Canada		7–4	12–4	7–8	13–2	6–5	9–6	1–7	9–1	6–5	7–2
Denmark	4–7		10–4	6–3	8–4	8–7	6–11	1–7	2–9	4–7	4–5
Hungary	4–12	4–10		2–7	3–11	4–5	4–10	1–7	8–9	2–10	0–9
Japan	8–7	3–6	7–2		9–2	7–5	5–7	5–7	9–6	4–5	5–4
Latvia	2–13	4–8	11–3	2–9		7–6	4–7	3–9	8–7	8–7	4–5
Norway	5–6	7–8	5–4	5–7	6–7		3–9	3–9	5–4	8–7	3–6
Russia	6–9	11–6	10–4	7–5	7–4	9–3		1–8	3–8	7–6	6–3
South Korea	7–1	7–1	7–1	7–5	9–3	9–3	8–1		10–5	8–3	9–0
Sweden	1–9	9–2	9–8	6–9	7–8	4–5	8–3	5–10		9–10	3–6
Switzerland	5–6	7–4	10–2	5–4	7–8	7–8	6–7	3–8	10–9		4–5

=== Round-robin results ===
==== Draw 1 ====
Saturday, February 15, 14:00

Sheet A	1	2	3	4	5	6	7	8	9	10	Final
Denmark (Halse) 🔨	1	0	3	2	0	0	1	0	0	1	8
Norway (Ramsfjell)	0	3	0	0	1	1	0	1	1	0	7

Sheet B	1	2	3	4	5	6	7	8	9	10	Final
Switzerland (Witschonke)	0	2	0	2	0	1	0	2	2	1	10
Sweden (Moberg) 🔨	1	0	3	0	4	0	1	0	0	0	9

Sheet C	1	2	3	4	5	6	7	8	9	10	Final
Russia (Rumiantseva) 🔨	2	2	0	4	0	1	0	1	X	X	10
Hungary (Joo)	0	0	1	0	2	0	1	0	X	X	4

Sheet D	1	2	3	4	5	6	7	8	9	10	Final
Canada (Zacharias)	0	0	3	1	0	0	1	0	2	0	7
Japan (Yamamoto) 🔨	1	1	0	0	2	1	0	2	0	1	8

Sheet E	1	2	3	4	5	6	7	8	9	10	Final
Latvia (Barone)	0	0	1	0	2	0	0	0	X	X	3
South Korea (Kim) 🔨	2	1	0	2	0	0	2	2	X	X	9

==== Draw 2 ====
Sunday, February 16, 09:00

Sheet A	1	2	3	4	5	6	7	8	9	10	Final
Sweden (Moberg)	0	0	0	0	0	1	0	X	X	X	1
Canada (Zacharias) 🔨	1	1	2	1	2	0	2	X	X	X	9

Sheet B	1	2	3	4	5	6	7	8	9	10	Final
Norway (Ramsfjell)	0	3	1	0	0	1	0	0	0	0	5
Japan (Yamamoto) 🔨	1	0	0	1	1	0	1	1	1	1	7

Sheet C	1	2	3	4	5	6	7	8	9	10	Final
Latvia (Barone)	0	0	0	0	2	0	1	0	1	X	4
Denmark (Halse) 🔨	2	0	1	1	0	3	0	1	0	X	8

Sheet D	1	2	3	4	5	6	7	8	9	10	Final
South Korea (Kim) 🔨	1	0	2	1	2	1	X	X	X	X	7
Hungary (Joo)	0	1	0	0	0	0	X	X	X	X	1

Sheet E	1	2	3	4	5	6	7	8	9	10	Final
Switzerland (Witschonke)	0	1	0	1	0	2	0	0	0	2	6
Russia (Rumiantseva) 🔨	1	0	1	0	3	0	0	1	1	0	7

==== Draw 3 ====
Sunday, February 16, 19:00

Sheet A	1	2	3	4	5	6	7	8	9	10	Final
Hungary (Joo)	0	0	2	0	0	0	X	X	X	X	2
Switzerland (Witschonke) 🔨	2	0	0	4	3	1	X	X	X	X	10

Sheet B	1	2	3	4	5	6	7	8	9	10	Final
Denmark (Halse)	0	0	1	0	0	0	0	X	X	X	1
South Korea (Kim) 🔨	0	3	0	0	1	0	3	X	X	X	7

Sheet C	1	2	3	4	5	6	7	8	9	10	Final
Norway (Ramsfjell)	1	0	1	0	0	1	0	0	1	1	5
Canada (Zacharias) 🔨	0	1	0	2	1	0	1	1	0	0	6

Sheet D	1	2	3	4	5	6	7	8	9	10	Final
Russia (Rumiantseva) 🔨	0	2	0	1	0	2	0	1	0	1	7
Latvia (Barone)	0	0	1	0	1	0	1	0	1	0	4

Sheet E	1	2	3	4	5	6	7	8	9	10	Final
Sweden (Moberg) 🔨	1	0	1	0	1	0	0	3	0	0	6
Japan (Yamamoto)	0	0	0	2	0	1	1	0	4	1	9

==== Draw 4 ====
Monday, February 17, 14:00

Sheet A	1	2	3	4	5	6	7	8	9	10	Final
Japan (Yamamoto) 🔨	1	5	0	1	0	2	X	X	X	X	9
Latvia (Barone)	0	0	1	0	1	0	X	X	X	X	2

Sheet B	1	2	3	4	5	6	7	8	9	10	Final
Russia (Rumiantseva)	0	0	2	0	1	1	0	2	0	X	6
Canada (Zacharias) 🔨	0	1	0	4	0	0	2	0	2	X	9

Sheet C	1	2	3	4	5	6	7	8	9	10	Final
South Korea (Kim) 🔨	2	1	0	2	0	1	0	0	4	X	10
Sweden (Moberg)	0	0	1	0	2	0	0	2	0	X	5

Sheet D	1	2	3	4	5	6	7	8	9	10	Final
Hungary (Joo) 🔨	0	1	0	0	0	1	0	2	0	X	4
Denmark (Halse)	1	0	3	0	2	0	1	0	3	X	10

Sheet E	1	2	3	4	5	6	7	8	9	10	Final
Norway (Ramsfjell)	0	2	0	0	0	0	1	2	1	2	8
Switzerland (Witschonke) 🔨	2	0	0	2	2	1	0	0	0	0	7

==== Draw 5 ====
Tuesday, February 18, 09:00

Sheet A	1	2	3	4	5	6	7	8	9	10	Final
Russia (Rumiantseva)	0	0	0	1	0	1	0	1	0	X	3
Sweden (Moberg) 🔨	2	1	1	0	2	0	1	0	1	X	8

Sheet B	1	2	3	4	5	6	7	8	9	10	Final
Latvia (Barone) 🔨	1	0	2	1	0	0	1	0	1	1	7
Norway (Ramsfjell)	0	1	0	0	2	1	0	2	0	0	6

Sheet C	1	2	3	4	5	6	7	8	9	10	Final
Denmark (Halse)	0	1	0	0	0	0	2	1	0	2	6
Japan (Yamamoto) 🔨	0	0	0	1	2	0	0	0	0	0	3

Sheet D	1	2	3	4	5	6	7	8	9	10	Final
Switzerland (Witschonke)	0	1	0	0	0	1	0	0	1	X	3
South Korea (Kim) 🔨	1	0	2	1	1	0	2	1	0	X	8

Sheet E	1	2	3	4	5	6	7	8	9	10	Final
Canada (Zacharias) 🔨	2	0	3	0	2	1	0	4	X	X	12
Hungary (Joo)	0	1	0	2	0	0	1	0	X	X	4

==== Draw 6 ====
Tuesday, February 18, 19:00

Sheet A	1	2	3	4	5	6	7	8	9	10	Final
Latvia (Barone)	0	2	2	0	4	1	0	2	X	X	11
Hungary (Joo) 🔨	1	0	0	1	0	0	1	0	X	X	3

Sheet B	1	2	3	4	5	6	7	8	9	10	Final
Sweden (Moberg)	0	1	0	2	0	4	2	X	X	X	9
Denmark (Halse) 🔨	0	0	1	0	1	0	0	X	X	X	2

Sheet C	1	2	3	4	5	6	7	8	9	10	Final
Canada (Zacharias)	0	0	0	1	0	2	0	1	0	2	6
Switzerland (Witschonke) 🔨	0	2	1	0	1	0	0	0	1	0	5

Sheet D	1	2	3	4	5	6	7	8	9	10	Final
Japan (Yamamoto) 🔨	0	0	1	1	0	1	0	0	2	0	5
Russia (Rumiantseva)	0	2	0	0	1	0	0	4	0	0	7

Sheet E	1	2	3	4	5	6	7	8	9	10	Final
South Korea (Kim)	0	1	0	3	0	3	2	0	X	X	9
Norway (Ramsfjell) 🔨	1	0	1	0	1	0	0	0	X	X	3

==== Draw 7 ====
Wednesday, February 19, 14:00

Sheet A	1	2	3	4	5	6	7	8	9	10	Final
Switzerland (Witschonke) 🔨	1	0	0	1	1	0	1	0	0	1	5
Japan (Yamamoto)	0	1	1	0	0	1	0	1	0	0	4

Sheet B	1	2	3	4	5	6	7	8	9	10	Final
South Korea (Kim)	0	0	1	2	0	0	2	3	X	X	8
Russia (Rumiantseva) 🔨	0	0	0	0	1	0	0	0	X	X	1

Sheet C	1	2	3	4	5	6	7	8	9	10	Final
Hungary (Joo)	0	0	0	0	0	0	1	0	3	0	4
Norway (Ramsfjell) 🔨	0	0	1	0	1	1	0	1	0	1	5

Sheet D	1	2	3	4	5	6	7	8	9	10	11	Final
Latvia (Barone) 🔨	1	0	1	0	2	0	1	1	1	0	1	8
Sweden (Moberg)	0	1	0	1	0	2	0	0	0	3	0	7

Sheet E	1	2	3	4	5	6	7	8	9	10	Final
Denmark (Halse)	0	0	2	0	0	1	0	0	1	0	4
Canada (Zacharias) 🔨	2	0	0	1	1	0	0	2	0	1	7

==== Draw 8 ====
Thursday, February 20, 09:00

Sheet A	1	2	3	4	5	6	7	8	9	10	Final
Norway (Ramsfjell) 🔨	1	0	1	0	0	1	0	X	X	X	3
Russia (Rumiantseva)	0	2	0	1	2	0	4	X	X	X	9

Sheet B	1	2	3	4	5	6	7	8	9	10	Final
Canada (Zacharias) 🔨	1	6	4	2	0	0	X	X	X	X	13
Latvia (Barone)	0	0	0	0	2	0	X	X	X	X	2

Sheet C	1	2	3	4	5	6	7	8	9	10	Final
Japan (Yamamoto)	0	0	1	3	0	0	0	0	1	0	5
South Korea (Kim) 🔨	0	2	0	0	1	0	0	2	0	2	7

Sheet D	1	2	3	4	5	6	7	8	9	10	Final
Denmark (Halse)	0	0	1	0	0	2	0	1	0	0	4
Switzerland (Witschonke) 🔨	0	1	0	0	1	0	0	0	2	3	7

Sheet E	1	2	3	4	5	6	7	8	9	10	Final
Hungary (Joo)	0	1	0	3	0	3	0	0	1	0	8
Sweden (Moberg) 🔨	1	0	2	0	1	0	3	1	0	1	9

==== Draw 9 ====
Thursday, February 20, 19:00

Sheet A	1	2	3	4	5	6	7	8	9	10	Final
Canada (Zacharias)	0	0	0	1	0	0	0	X	X	X	1
South Korea (Kim) 🔨	1	1	1	0	0	3	1	X	X	X	7

Sheet B	1	2	3	4	5	6	7	8	9	10	Final
Japan (Yamamoto)	2	1	0	1	1	2	0	X	X	X	7
Hungary (Joo) 🔨	0	0	1	0	0	0	1	X	X	X	2

Sheet C	1	2	3	4	5	6	7	8	9	10	Final
Switzerland (Witschonke) 🔨	1	2	1	0	0	0	1	0	2	0	7
Latvia (Barone)	0	0	0	1	3	2	0	1	0	1	8

Sheet D	1	2	3	4	5	6	7	8	9	10	Final
Sweden (Moberg) 🔨	0	0	0	1	0	1	0	0	2	0	4
Norway (Ramsfjell)	0	1	0	0	0	0	1	1	0	2	5

Sheet E	1	2	3	4	5	6	7	8	9	10	Final
Russia (Rumiantseva) 🔨	4	1	0	2	0	0	2	0	2	X	11
Denmark (Halse)	0	0	2	0	2	0	0	2	0	X	6

=== Playoffs ===
Semifinal
1	South Korea	8
4	Japan	4
2	Canada	9
3	Russia	8

Final
1	South Korea	5
2	Canada	7

Bronze-medal game
4	Japan	4
3	Russia	14

==== Semifinals ====
Friday, February 21, 19:00

Sheet B	1	2	3	4	5	6	7	8	9	10	Final
South Korea (Kim) 🔨	2	0	1	0	1	0	2	0	2	X	8
Japan (Yamamoto)	0	1	0	1	0	1	0	1	0	X	4

Sheet D	1	2	3	4	5	6	7	8	9	10	11	Final
Canada (Zacharias) 🔨	0	0	1	0	3	0	2	0	2	0	1	9
Russia (Rumiantseva)	1	1	0	2	0	1	0	1	0	2	0	8

==== Bronze-medal game ====
Saturday, February 22, 14:00

Sheet A	1	2	3	4	5	6	7	8	9	10	Final
Japan (Yamamoto)	0	1	0	0	0	2	0	1	X	X	4
Russia (Rumiantseva) 🔨	2	0	5	1	2	0	4	0	X	X	14

==== Final ====
Saturday, February 22, 14:00

Sheet C	1	2	3	4	5	6	7	8	9	10	Final
South Korea (Kim) 🔨	0	0	3	1	0	0	1	0	0	X	5
Canada (Zacharias)	0	1	0	0	2	1	0	1	2	X	7
