= Brayden Payette =

Canadian curler (born 2000)

- Curler
- Born: April 6, 2000 (age 26); Brandon, Manitoba

Team
- Curling club: Brandon CC, Brandon, MB
- Skip: Jacques Gauthier
- Third: Jordan Peters
- Second: Brayden Payette
- Lead: Cole Chandler

Curling career
- Member Association: Manitoba
- Top CTRS ranking: 27th (2019–20)
Medal record
Men's curling
Representing Canada
World Junior Curling Championships
Gold medal – first place	2020 Krasnoyarsk

Brayden Payette (born April 6, 2000) is a Canadian curler from Brandon, Manitoba. He currently plays second on Team Jacques Gauthier.

== Career ==
Payette joined the Jacques Gauthier rink at second for the 2019–20 season with Jordan Peters at third and Zack Bilawka at lead. Before this, he played with Chase Dusessoy from 2015 to 2017 and skipped his own team from 2017 to 2019. The team lost in the final of the 2020 Manitoba Junior Provincials to Brett Walter but still got to compete at the 2020 Canadian Junior Curling Championships, representing the second Manitoba team as Nunavut and Yukon did not send teams. The team finished the round robin and championship pool with a 9–1 record which qualified them for the final. The team curled 92% which led them to a 8–6 victory over Newfoundland and Labrador's Daniel Bruce. At the 2020 World Junior Curling Championships, the team finished the round robin in second with a 7–2 record. In the playoffs, they defeated Germany in the semifinal and Switzerland in the final to claim the gold medal.

== Personal life ==
Payette currently works as an apprentice carpenter.

== Teams ==
Season	Skip	Third	Second	Lead
2015–16	Chase Dusessoy	Brayden Payette	Colton Harris	Kyle Gardiner
2016–17	Chase Dusessoy	Brayden Payette	Colton Harris	Kyle Gardiner
2017–18	Brayden Payette	Tyler Grumpelt	Bryce Cisyk	Kyle Gardiner
2018–19	Brayden Payette	Tyler Grumpelt	Bryce Cisyk	Kyle Gardiner
2019–20	Jacques Gauthier	Jordan Peters	Brayden Payette	Zack Bilawka
2020–21	Jacques Gauthier	Jordan Peters	Brayden Payette	Cole Chandler
2021–22	Jacques Gauthier	Jordan Peters	Brayden Payette	Cole Chandler
