= Jordan Peters (curler) =

Canadian curler (born 1998)

- Curler
- Born: December 12, 1998 (age 27); Winkler, Manitoba, Canada

Team
- Curling club: Assiniboine Memorial CC, Winnipeg, MB
- Skip: Jordan Peters
- Third: Adam Flatt
- Second: Sean Flatt
- Lead: Emerson Klimpke

Curling career
- Member Association: Manitoba
- Top CTRS ranking: 27th (2019–20)
Medal record
Men's curling
Representing Canada
World Junior Curling Championships
Gold medal – first place	2020 Krasnoyarsk

Jordan Peters (born December 12, 1998) is a Canadian curler from Rosenort, Manitoba. He is the head coach of the Providence University College Men’s and Women’s Curling Programs.

== Career ==
=== Juniors ===
Peters first represented Manitoba at the 2017 Canadian U18 Curling Championships as third for Brett Walter. There, they finished in tenth place out of twelve teams with a 3–5 record. He won his first Manitoba junior title in 2019 with skip JT Ryan, sending the team to the 2019 Canadian Junior Curling Championships. At the championship, they finished round robin and championship pool play with a 7–3 record, qualifying for the playoffs. They defeated Saskatchewan's Rylan Kleiter in the semifinal before losing to British Columbia's Tyler Tardi in the final.

Peters joined the Jacques Gauthier rink at third for the 2019–20 season with Brayden Payette at second and Zack Bilawka at lead. The team lost in the final of the 2020 Manitoba Junior Provincials to Peters' former skip Walter but still got to compete at the 2020 Canadian Junior Curling Championships, representing the second Manitoba team as Nunavut and Yukon did not send teams. The team finished the round robin and championship pool with a 9–1 record which qualified them for the final. The team curled 92% which led them to a 8–6 victory over Newfoundland and Labrador's Daniel Bruce. At the 2020 World Junior Curling Championships, the team finished the round robin in second with a 7–2 record. In the playoffs, they defeated Germany in the semifinal and Switzerland in the final to claim the gold medal.

=== Mens ===
In graduating to mens play during the 2022-23 season, Peters announced his new teammates for the following season, Andrew Clapham, Zack Bilawka and, Cole Chandler. Peters did however announce at the end of the year that he would be taking a step back from competitive curling.

After a one year break from competitive curling, on May 29, 2024, Peters announced he would be returning to curling skipping a new team. He would be joined by Adam Flatt, Sean Flatt and Emerson Klimpke. The team would compete at the 2025 Viterra Championship, the Manitoba Men's provincial championship. The team would finish with a 2–2 record, narrowly missing the playoff round.

== Personal life ==
Peters graduated as a business student at the Providence University College and Theological Seminary. Peters is from a family of 6, with 2 younger brothers and 1 sister.

Peters is an outspoken lifelong supporter of the Green Bay Packers of the NFL.

== Teams ==
Season	Skip	Third	Second	Lead
2015–16	Lorne Hamblin	Brian Peters	Jordan Peters	Graeme Bergman
2016–17	Jordan Peters	Zachary Wasylik	Graeme Bergman	Liam Tod
2016–17	Brett Walter	Jordan Peters	Zachary Wasylik	Liam Tod
2017–18	Jordan Peters	Andrew Clapham	Luke Loewen	Cole Chandler
2018–19	JT Ryan	Jacques Gauthier	Jordan Peters	Cole Chandler
2019–20	Jacques Gauthier	Jordan Peters	Brayden Payette	Zack Bilawka
2020–21	Jacques Gauthier	Jordan Peters	Brayden Payette	Cole Chandler
2021–22	Jacques Gauthier	Jordan Peters	Brayden Payette	Cole Chandler
2022–23	Jordan Peters	Andrew Clapham	Zack Bilawka	Cole Chandler
2024–25	Jordan Peters	Adam Flatt	Sean Flatt	Emerson Klimpke
