= Jacques Gauthier (curler) =

Canadian curler (born 1998)

- Curler
- Born: October 17, 1998 (age 28); Winnipeg, Manitoba, Canada

Team
- Curling club: West St. Paul CC, Winnipeg, MB
- Skip: Jordon McDonald
- Third: Jacques Gauthier
- Second: Elias Huminicki
- Lead: Cameron Olafson

Curling career
- Member Association: Manitoba (2014–2022; 2024–present); British Columbia (2022–2023); Alberta (2023–2024)
- Brier: 3 (2021, 2023, 2024)
- Top CTRS ranking: 5th (2023–24)
Medal record
Men's Curling
Representing Canada
World Junior Curling Championships
Gold medal – first place	2018 Aberdeen
Gold medal – first place	2020 Krasnoyarsk

Jacques Gauthier (born October 17, 1998) is a Canadian curler from Winnipeg, Manitoba. He currently plays third on Team Jordon McDonald.

== Career ==
=== Juniors ===
Gauthier played most of his junior career as third for JT Ryan. With Ryan, he won a silver medal at the 2019 Canadian Junior Curling Championships and a bronze medal at the 2018 Canadian Junior Curling Championships. In 2018, he got to play in his first World Junior Curling Championships as alternate for his cousin, Tyler Tardi's rink, where the team won a gold medal.

Ryan aged out of juniors after the 2019 championships and Gauthier formed his own team for the 2019–20 season. His rink of Jordan Peters, Brayden Payette and Zack Bilawka lost the final of the 2020 Manitoba Junior Provincials. They still got to go to the 2020 Canadian Junior Curling Championships, representing the second Manitoba team as Nunavut and Yukon did not send teams. The team finished the round robin and championship pool with a 9–1 record which qualified them for the final. The team curled 92% which led them to a 8–6 victory over Newfoundland and Labrador's Daniel Bruce. At the 2020 World Junior Curling Championships, the team finished the round robin in second with a 7–2 record. In the playoffs, they defeated Germany in the semifinal and Switzerland in the final to claim the gold medal.

=== Mens ===
Gauthier found success in men's play, skipping a rink out of BC for the 2022–23 curling season. In their first season together, the team won the 2023 BC Men's Curling Championship and represented British Columbia at the 2023 Tim Hortons Brier. At the Brier, the team finished with a 3–5 record.

Gauthier later announced he would be joining the Kevin Koe rink at second for the 2023–24 curling season. Koe qualified for the 2024 Montana's Brier as one of the wild card teams based on their CTRS ranking. However, at their first Brier as a team, they had a poor showing, finishing 2–6 and not qualifying for the playoff round. The team also struggled at the Grand Slam of Curling circuit, not qualifying for the playoffs at any of the 2023–24 events.

At the beginning of the 2024–25 curling season, the Koe team announced that they would be parting ways with Gauthier. Gauthier would go on to skip a new team out of Manitoba for the remainder of the season, where they qualified for the 2025 Viterra Championship, the Manitoba Men's Curling Championship. Gauthier would go on to finish tied for fifth at the event, with a 4–3 record.

Gauthier would later join the Jordon McDonald rink as third for the 2025–26 curling season, alongside Elias Huminicki and Cameron Olafson. The new team McDonald would start off strong, playing in the 2025 U25 NextGen Classic and finishing second after losing 6–4 in the final to Sam Mooibroek. The team would also qualify for the 2025 Canadian Olympic Curling Pre-Trials, where Team McDonald would win the event – beating Manitoba rival Braden Calvert 2 games to 1 in a best-of-three final, qualifying the team for the 2025 Canadian Olympic Curling Trials. At the Olympic Trials, the McDonald rink would finish round robin play with a 1–6 record. Team McDonald would also participate in the Tier 1 Grand Slam of Curling event at the 2025 GSOC Tahoe. There, McDonald would finish 1–3. They would also play in the 2026 Bunge Championship (the Manitoba provincial men's championship) where they would again face provincial rivals Team Calvert in the final, but this time would lose 10–7 in an extra end, finishing second.

== Personal life ==
Gauthier currently lives in Winnipeg and was a finance student at the University of Manitoba. He currently works as a financial analyst with BDO Canada LLP. He is in a relationship with fellow curler Karlee Burgess. His mother Cathy is a three-time Tournament of Hearts champion and curling broadcaster.

== Grand Slam record ==
Key
C	Champion
F	Lost in Final
SF	Lost in Semifinal
QF	Lost in Quarterfinals
R16	Lost in the round of 16
Q	Did not advance to playoffs
T2	Played in Tier 2 event
DNP	Did not participate in event
N/A	Not a Grand Slam event that season

Event	2017–18	2018–19	2019–20	2020–21	2021–22	2022–23	2023–24	2024–25	2025–26	2026–27
Invitational	DNP	DNP	DNP	N/A	N/A	T2	Q	DNP	DNP	DNP
Masters	DNP	DNP	DNP	N/A	DNP	DNP	Q	DNP	T2	Q
National	DNP	DNP	DNP	N/A	DNP	DNP	Q	DNP	Q	Q
Open	DNP	DNP	DNP	N/A	N/A	DNP	Q	DNP	T2	
Players'	DNP	DNP	N/A	DNP	DNP	DNP	Q	DNP	DNP	
Champions Cup	Q (Note: Gauthier spared for Zach Curtis.)	DNP	N/A	DNP	DNP	DNP	N/A	N/A	N/A	N/A

== Teams ==
Season	Skip	Third	Second	Lead
2014–15	Jordan Smith	Jacques Gauthier	Graham McFarlane	Kyle Allenby
2015–16	JT Ryan	Jacques Gauthier	Graham McFarlane	Hugh McFarlane
2016–17	JT Ryan	Jacques Gauthier	Graham McFarlane	Brendan Bilawka
2017–18	JT Ryan	Jacques Gauthier	Colin Kurz	Brendan Bilawka
2018–19	JT Ryan	Jacques Gauthier	Jordan Peters	Cole Chandler
2019–20	Jacques Gauthier	Jordan Peters	Brayden Payette	Zack Bilawka
2020–21	Jacques Gauthier	Jordan Peters	Brayden Payette	Cole Chandler
2021–22	Jacques Gauthier	Jordan Peters	Brayden Payette	Cole Chandler
2022–23	Jacques Gauthier	Sterling Middleton	Jason Ginter	Alex Horvath
2023–24	Kevin Koe	Tyler Tardi	Jacques Gauthier	Karrick Martin
2024 (Sept.)	Kevin Koe	Tyler Tardi	Jacques Gauthier	Karrick Martin
2024–25	Jacques Gauthier	Derek Samagalski	Tanner Lott	Ronald Gauthier
2025–26	Jordon McDonald	Jacques Gauthier	Elias Huminicki	Cameron Olafson
2026–27	Jordon McDonald	Jacques Gauthier	Elias Huminicki	Cameron Olafson
