= Zack Bilawka =

Canadian curler (born 2001)

- Curler
- Born: February 19, 2001 (age 25); Winnipeg, Manitoba

Team
- Curling club: Charleswood CC, Winnipeg, MB
- Skip: Devon Wiebe
- Third: Julien Leduc
- Second: Thomas Dunlop
- Lead: Zack Bilawka

Curling career
- Member Association: Manitoba
- Top CTRS ranking: 27th (2019–20)
Medal record
Men's curling
Representing Canada
World Junior Curling Championships
Gold medal – first place	2020 Krasnoyarsk
Representing Manitoba
Canada Winter Games
Bronze medal – third place	2019 Red Deer

Zachary Bilawka (born February 19, 2001) is a Canadian curler from Winnipeg, Manitoba. He currently plays lead on Team Devon Wiebe.

== Career ==
Bilawka played for the Graham Loewen rink from 2017 to 2019 and the team represented Manitoba at the 2019 Canada Winter Games. The team finished the round robin with a 6–4 record, qualifying for the playoffs. They then defeated Alberta in the quarterfinals before losing to eventual champions British Columbia in the semifinals. In the bronze medal game, they were able to defeat Newfoundland and Labrador 8–7 to claim the bronze medal.

Bilawka joined the Jacques Gauthier rink at lead for the 2019–20 season with Jordan Peters at third and Brayden Payette at second. The team lost in the final of the 2020 Manitoba Junior Provincials to Brett Walter but still got to compete at the 2020 Canadian Junior Curling Championships, representing the second Manitoba team as Nunavut and Yukon did not send teams. The team finished the round robin and championship pool with a 9–1 record which qualified them for the final. The team curled 92% which led them to a 8–6 victory over Newfoundland and Labrador's Daniel Bruce. At the 2020 World Junior Curling Championships, the team finished the round robin in second with a 7–2 record. In the playoffs, they defeated Germany in the semifinal and Switzerland in the final to claim the gold medal.

== Personal life ==
Bilawka is currently a business student at the University of Manitoba.

== Teams ==
Season	Skip	Third	Second	Lead
2017–18	Graham Loewen	Sean Flatt	Zack Bilawka	Adam Flatt
2018–19	Graham Loewen	Sean Flatt	Zack Bilawka	Adam Flatt
2019–20	Jacques Gauthier	Jordan Peters	Brayden Payette	Zack Bilawka
2020–21	Ryan Wiebe	Sean Flatt	Zack Bilawka	Adam Flatt
2021–22	Ryan Wiebe	Sean Flatt	Zack Bilawka	Adam Flatt
2022–23	Jordan Peters	Andrew Clapham	Zack Bilawka	Cole Chandler
2023–24	Devon Wiebe	Julien Leduc	Thomas Dunlop	Zack Bilawka
2024–25	Devon Wiebe	Julien Leduc	Thomas Dunlop	Zack Bilawka
