= Jeremy Harty =

Canadian curler

- Curler
- Born: May 22, 1995 (age 31); Nanton, Alberta

Team
- Curling club: The Glencoe Club, Calgary, AB
- Skip: Evan van Amsterdam
- Third: Jeremy Harty
- Second: Jason Ginter
- Lead: Parker Konschuh
- Mixed doubles partner: Kayla Skrlik

Curling career
- Member Association: Alberta
- Brier: 1 (2024)
- Top CTRS ranking: 5th (2025–26)

Jeremy Harty (born May 22, 1995) is a Canadian curler from Calgary, Alberta. He currently plays third on Team Evan van Amsterdam.

== Career ==
Harty competed in the 2016 Alberta Junior Curling Championships with his team of Kyler Kleibrink, Joel Berger and Gregg Hamilton. The team went undefeated until the final where they lost to the Karsten Sturmay rink 7–4. The next season, the team aged out of juniors and competed in their first provincial championship. In the triple knockout format of the 2017 Boston Pizza Cup, the team finished 3–3, being knocked out by eventual runner-up Ted Appelman. Team Harty returned to the provincial championship the following season at the 2018 Boston Pizza Cup, this time going 2–3 and being knocked out by Thomas Usselman.

During the 2018–19 season, Harty won his first World Curling Tour event at the McKee Homes Fall Curling Classic with teammates Kyler Kleibrink, Joel Berger and Kurtis Goller. At the 2019 Boston Pizza Cup, the team just missed qualifying for the playoffs, losing the C Qualifier game to Karsten Sturmay. Team Harty did manage to beat eventual champions Team Kevin Koe in the second game of the tournament, however.

The 2019–20 season was Team Harty's most successful season to date. The team began their season with two straight wins at both the Avonair Cash Spiel and the McKee Homes Fall Curling Classic, defending their title from 2018. They then won the Original 16 WCT Bonspiel in November 2019 and the College Clean Restoration Curling Classic in December 2019. The team, however, could not carry this momentum into the provincial championship, as they finished with a 3–2 record at the 2020 Boston Pizza Cup, just outside of the playoffs once again.

During the abbreviated 2020–21 season, Team Harty was able to play in four tour events. Their best finish came at the ATB Banff Classic where they won three straight games against Brendan Bottcher, Karsten Sturmay and Kevin Koe to claim the event title. They also competed in the ATB Okotoks Classic where they lost in the semifinal to Team Bottcher, the McKee Homes Fall Curling Classic where they lost in the quarterfinals and the Ashley HomeStore Curling Classic where they failed to reach the playoffs. Due to the COVID-19 pandemic in Alberta, the 2021 provincial championship was cancelled. Because of this, Curling Alberta got to decide the team that would represent Alberta at the 2021 Tim Hortons Brier. There was some question on who Curling Alberta would choose as their provincial representatives as Team Bottcher were the reigning provincial champions but Team Harty were leading in the Alberta points tour. If the association chose Team Harty to represent Alberta, there would be three Alberta teams qualified for the national championship as both Bottcher and Kevin Koe would qualify as two of the three Wild Card teams. Curling Alberta, however, chose Team Bottcher to represent Alberta at the Brier, ending Team Harty's chances of potentially competing in their first national championship. The following season, Harty and his team did have enough points to qualify for the 2021 Canadian Olympic Curling Pre-Trials for a chance to qualify for the 2021 Canadian Olympic Curling Trials. At the Pre-Trials, the team finished with a disappointing 0–6 record.

Harty joined the Aaron Sluchinski as third at the beginning of the 2022–23 curling season. The Sluchinski rink would be invited to compete at the 2023 PointsBet Invitational tournament, organized by Curling Canada. There, the team was eliminated in the "Sweep 16" round against Mike McEwen. The team played in three Grand Slam of Curling events during the season, the 2023 Tour Challenge, the 2023 National and the 2023 Masters, failing to make the playoffs in all three. Later in the season, the team won the 2024 Boston Pizza Cup when they defeated Kevin Koe in the final in an upset. The team represented one of the Alberta teams at the 2024 Montana's Brier. There, they finished pool play with a 4–4 record. However, early into the 2024–25 curling season, Sluchinski announced that he would be leaving his team and joining the Kevin Koe rink at third, and Harty did not curl with another team competitively for the remainder of the 2024–25 season. Harty would later announce his return to Men's play the following season, joining the Evan van Amsterdam rink as third.

== Personal life ==
Harty is employed as an audit manager at RSM Canada. He is engaged to fellow curler Kayla Skrlik.

== Teams ==
Season	Skip	Third	Second	Lead
2011–12	Jeremy Harty	Cole Parsons	Joel Berger	Daniel LaCoste
2012–13	Jeremy Harty	Cole Parsons	Joel Berger	Daniel LaCoste
2013–14	Jeremy Harty	Cole Parsons	Joel Berger	Gregg Hamilton
2014–15	Jeremy Harty	Cole Parsons	Joel Berger	Gregg Hamilton
2015–16	Jeremy Harty	Kyler Kleibrink	Joel Berger	Gregg Hamilton
2016–17	Jeremy Harty	Dylan Webster	Joel Berger	Gregg Hamilton
2017–18	Jeremy Harty	Kyler Kleibrink	Joel Berger	Gregg Hamilton
2018–19	Jeremy Harty	Kyler Kleibrink	Joel Berger	Kurtis Goller
2019–20	Jeremy Harty	Kyler Kleibrink	Joel Berger	Kurtis Goller
2020–21	Jeremy Harty	Kyler Kleibrink	Joshua Kiist	Kurtis Goller
2021–22	Jeremy Harty	Kyler Kleibrink	Joshua Kiist	Kurtis Goller
2022–23	Aaron Sluchinski	Jeremy Harty	Kerr Drummond	Dylan Webster
2023–24	Aaron Sluchinski	Jeremy Harty	Kerr Drummond	Dylan Webster
2024	Aaron Sluchinski	Jeremy Harty	Kyle Doering	Dylan Webster
2025–26	Evan van Amsterdam	Jeremy Harty	Jason Ginter	Parker Konschuh
2026–27	Evan van Amsterdam	Jeremy Harty	Jason Ginter	Parker Konschuh
