= Kyler Kleibrink =

Canadian curler (born 1995)

- Curler
- Born: October 1, 1995 (age 31); Calgary, Alberta

Team
- Curling club: Calgary Curling Club, Calgary
- Skip: Darren Moulding
- Third: Kyler Kleibrink
- Second: Andrew Nerpin
- Lead: Evan Crough
- Mixed doubles partner: Selena Sturmay

Curling career
- Member Association: Alberta (2011–2023; 2025–present); British Columbia (2023–24)
- Top CTRS ranking: 15th (2019–20)

Kyler Kleibrink (born October 1, 1995) is a Canadian curler from Calgary, Alberta.

== Career ==
Kleibrink joined the Jeremy Harty rink at third with second Joel Berger and lead Gregg Hamilton for the 2015–16 season. Before joining the team, he skipped his own team, however, was unable to win an Alberta Junior Championship. The team competed in the 2016 Alberta Junior Curling Championships where they went undefeated until the final where they lost to the Karsten Sturmay rink 7–4. The next season, Kleibrink left the team as they aged out of juniors and formed his own team to try to capture the 2017 Alberta Junior Championship. He skipped his team of Mark Taylor, Tyler van Amsterdam and Connor Lenton to a semifinal finish where they would lose to eventual champions Colton Goller. Kleibrink rejoined Team Harty the following season and the team competed in their first provincial championship. At the 2018 Boston Pizza Cup, the team went 2–3 in the triple knockout format, being knocked out by Team Thomas Usselman.

During the 2018–19 season, Team Harty won their first World Curling Tour event at the McKee Homes Fall Curling Classic. At the 2019 Boston Pizza Cup, the team just missed qualifying for the playoffs, losing the C Qualifier game to Karsten Sturmay. Team Harty did manage to beat eventual champions Team Kevin Koe in the second game of the tournament, however.

The 2019–20 season was Team Harty's most successful season to date. The team began their season with two straight wins at both the Avonair Cash Spiel and the McKee Homes Fall Curling Classic, defending their title from 2018. They then won the Original 16 WCT Bonspiel in November 2019 and the College Clean Restoration Curling Classic in December 2019. The team, however, could not carry this momentum into the provincial championship, as they finished with a 3–2 record at the 2020 Boston Pizza Cup, just outside of the playoffs once again.

During the abbreviated 2020–21 season, Team Harty was able to play in four tour events. Their best finish came at the ATB Banff Classic where they won three straight games against Brendan Bottcher, Karsten Sturmay and Kevin Koe to claim the event title. They also competed in the ATB Okotoks Classic where they lost in the semifinal to Team Bottcher, the McKee Homes Fall Curling Classic where they lost in the quarterfinals and the Ashley HomeStore Curling Classic where they failed to reach the playoffs. Due to the COVID-19 pandemic in Alberta, the 2021 provincial championship was cancelled. Because of this, Curling Alberta got to decide the team that would represent Alberta at the 2021 Tim Hortons Brier. There was some question on who Curling Alberta would choose as their provincial representatives as Team Bottcher were the reigning provincial champions but Team Harty were leading in the Alberta points tour. If the association chose Team Harty to represent Alberta, there would be three Alberta teams qualified for the national championship as both Bottcher and Kevin Koe would qualify as two of the three Wild Card teams. Curling Alberta, however, chose Team Bottcher to represent Alberta at the Brier, ending Team Harty's chances of potentially competing in their first national championship. The following season, Harty and his team did have enough points to qualify for the 2021 Canadian Olympic Curling Pre-Trials for a chance to qualify for the 2021 Canadian Olympic Curling Trials. At the Pre-Trials, the team finished with a disappointing 0–6 record. At the beginning of the 2023-24 curling season, Kleibrink moved to British Columbia to skip a new team, however, the new team parted ways halfway through the season, with Kleibrink joining the Brent Pierce rink in New Westminster. The rink qualified for the 2024 BC Men's Curling Championship.

Aside from men's curling, Kleibrink has also competed in two Canadian Mixed Doubles Curling Championship. In 2019, he finished 4–3 with partner Chantele Broderson and in 2021, he went 2–4 with Chaelynn Kitz.

== Personal life ==
Kleibrink is employed as an applications specialist at Canadian Natural Resources. His mother is 2006 Olympic bronze medallist Shannon Kleibrink. She is the coach of his team. He studied at the University of Calgary.

== Teams ==
| Season | Skip | Third | Second | Lead |
|---|---|---|---|---|
| 2011–12 | Kyler Kleibrink | Richard Kleibrink | Kyle Morrison | Ty Parcels |
| 2012–13 | Kyler Kleibrink | Richard Kleibrink | Kyle Morrison | Ty Parcels |
| 2013–14 | Kyler Kleibrink | Richard Kleibrink | Kyle Morrison | Ty Parcels |
| 2014–15 | Kyler Kleibrink | Richard Kleibrink | Kyle Morrison | Ty Parcels |
| 2015–16 | Jeremy Harty | Kyler Kleibrink | Joel Berger | Gregg Hamilton |
| 2016–17 | Kyler Kleibrink | Mark Taylor | Tyler van Amsterdam | Connor Lenton |
| 2017–18 | Jeremy Harty | Kyler Kleibrink | Joel Berger | Gregg Hamilton |
| 2018–19 | Jeremy Harty | Kyler Kleibrink | Joel Berger | Kurtis Goller |
| 2019–20 | Jeremy Harty | Kyler Kleibrink | Joel Berger | Kurtis Goller |
| 2020–21 | Jeremy Harty | Kyler Kleibrink | Joshua Kiist | Kurtis Goller |
| 2021–22 | Jeremy Harty | Kyler Kleibrink | Joshua Kiist | Kurtis Goller |
| 2022–23 | Kyler Kleibrink | Dustin Kalthoff; Joshua Kiist | Chris Kennedy | Evan van Amsterdam |
| 2023–24 | Kyler Kleibrink; Brent Pierce | Sébastien Robillard; Cody Johnston | Andrew Nerpin; Kyler Kleibrink | Jordan Tardi; Nicholas Umbach |
| 2025–26 | Darren Moulding | Kyler Kleibrink | Andrew Nerpin | Evan Crough |
