= Kurtis Goller =

Canadian curler

- Curler
- Born: March 7, 1997 (age 29); High River, Alberta

Team
- Curling club: The Glencoe Club, Calgary, AB

Curling career
- Member Association: Alberta
- Brier: 1 (2023)
- Top CTRS ranking: 6th (2022–23)

Kurtis Goller (born March 7, 1997) is a Canadian curler from Calgary, Alberta.

== Career ==
In 2015, Goller represented Alberta at the 2015 Canada Winter Games, playing second for the Owen Goerzen rink. The team went 2–3 through the round robin before losing to Prince Edward Island in a tiebreaker, eliminating them from contention.

Goller won the Alberta Junior Curling Championships in 2017 with his team of Colton Goller at skip, Tyler Lautner at third and Nicholas Rabl at lead. This qualified the team to represent Alberta at the 2017 Canadian Junior Curling Championships, held January 21–29 in Esquimalt, British Columbia. After going 4–2 through the round robin, the team went 2–5 in the championship pool, finishing the event in seventh place. After taking the next season off, Goller joined the Jeremy Harty rink at lead for the 2018–19 season. During their first season together, Team Harty won their first World Curling Tour event at the McKee Homes Fall Curling Classic. At the 2019 Boston Pizza Cup, the team just missed qualifying for the playoffs, losing the C Qualifier game to Karsten Sturmay. Team Harty did manage to beat eventual champions Team Kevin Koe in the second game of the tournament, however.

The 2019–20 season was Team Harty's most successful season to date. The team began their season with two straight wins at both the Avonair Cash Spiel and the McKee Homes Fall Curling Classic, defending their title from 2018. They then won the Original 16 WCT Bonspiel in November 2019 and the College Clean Restoration Curling Classic in December 2019. The team, however, could not carry this momentum into the provincial championship, as they finished with a 3–2 record at the 2020 Boston Pizza Cup, just outside of the playoffs once again.

During the abbreviated 2020–21 season, Team Harty was able to play in four tour events. Their best finish came at the ATB Banff Classic where they won three straight games against Brendan Bottcher, Karsten Sturmay and Kevin Koe to claim the event title. They also competed in the ATB Okotoks Classic where they lost in the semifinal to Team Bottcher, the McKee Homes Fall Curling Classic where they lost in the quarterfinals and the Ashley HomeStore Curling Classic where they failed to reach the playoffs. Due to the COVID-19 pandemic in Alberta, the 2021 provincial championship was cancelled. Because of this, Curling Alberta got to decide the team that would represent Alberta at the 2021 Tim Hortons Brier. There was some question on who Curling Alberta would choose as their provincial representatives as Team Bottcher were the reigning provincial champions but Team Harty were leading in the Alberta points tour. If the association chose Team Harty to represent Alberta, there would be three Alberta teams qualified for the national championship as both Bottcher and Kevin Koe would qualify as two of the three Wild Card teams. Curling Alberta, however, chose Team Bottcher to represent Alberta at the Brier, ending Team Harty's chances of potentially competing in their first national championship. The following season, Harty and his team did have enough points to qualify for the 2021 Canadian Olympic Curling Pre-Trials for a chance to qualify for the 2021 Canadian Olympic Curling Trials. At the Pre-Trials, the team finished with a disappointing 0–6 record.

== Personal life ==
Goller is employed as a Project Leader at NCS Multistage.

== Teams ==
Season	Skip	Third	Second	Lead
2011–12	Colton Goller	Tyler Lautner	Kurtis Goller	Nicholas Rabl
2012–13	Colton Goller	Tyler Lautner	Kurtis Goller	Nicholas Rabl
2014–15	Colton Goller	Tyler Lautner	Kurtis Goller	Nicholas Rabl
2015–16	Colton Goller	Tyler Lautner	Kurtis Goller	Nicholas Rabl
2016–17	Colton Goller	Tyler Lautner	Kurtis Goller	Nicholas Rabl
2018–19	Jeremy Harty	Kyler Kleibrink	Joel Berger	Kurtis Goller
2019–20	Jeremy Harty	Kyler Kleibrink	Joel Berger	Kurtis Goller
2020–21	Jeremy Harty	Kyler Kleibrink	Joshua Kiist	Kurtis Goller
2021–22	Jeremy Harty	Kyler Kleibrink	Joshua Kiist	Kurtis Goller
2022–23	Karsten Sturmay	Kyle Doering	Kurtis Goller	Glenn Venance
2023–24	Karsten Sturmay	Kyle Doering	Glenn Venance	Kurtis Goller
