= 2020 Boston Pizza Cup =

2020 Alberta Boston Pizza Cup presented by Best Western
- Host city: Westlock, Alberta
- Arena: Westlock Curling Club
- Dates: February 5–9
- Winner: Team Bottcher
- Curling club: Saville Community Sports Centre, Edmonton
- Skip: Brendan Bottcher
- Third: Darren Moulding
- Second: Brad Thiessen
- Lead: Karrick Martin
- Finalist: Karsten Sturmay

The 2020 Alberta Boston Pizza Cup presented by Best Western, the provincial men's curling championship for Alberta, was held from February 5 to 9 at the Westlock Curling Club in Westlock, Alberta. The winning Brendan Bottcher rink represented Alberta at the 2020 Tim Hortons Brier in Kingston, Ontario.

In an all Saville Community SC final, Brendan Bottcher defeated Karsten Sturmay 7–6 with a draw to the button in the tenth end to win his third provincial title.

== Qualification ==
Qualification	Berths	Qualifying team(s)
CTRS leader	1	Brendan Bottcher
Alberta Tour	3	Jeremy Harty; James Pahl; Karsten Sturmay
Inglewood Qualifier	4	Aaron Sluchinski; Robert Johnson; Daylan Vavrek; Kevin Park
Ottewell Qualifier	3	Ted Appelman; Jacob Libbus; Evan van Amsterdam
Fort St. John Qualifier	1	Scott Webb

== Teams ==
The teams are listed as follows:

Skip	Third	Second	Lead	Alternate	Club
Ted Appelman	Nathan Connolly	Shawn Donnelly	Adam Enright		Avonair Curling Club, Edmonton
Brendan Bottcher	Darren Moulding	Bradley Thiessen	Karrick Martin		Saville Sports Centre, Edmonton
Jeremy Harty	Kyler Kleibrink	Joel Berger	Kurtis Goller		The Glencoe Club, Calgary
Robert Johnson	Lyle Kent	Steve Thomas	Nathan Relitz	Jim Perry	Calgary Curling Club, Calgary
Jacob Libbus	Dustin Mikush	Michael Henricks	Zachary Pawliuk		Saville Sports Centre, Edmonton
James Pahl	Glen Kennedy	Roland Robinson	Craig MacAlpine		Sherwood Park Curling Club, Sherwood Park
Kevin Park	Robert Collins	Scott Garnett	Ben Savage		Strathmore Curling Club, Strathmore
Aaron Sluchinski	J. D. Lind	Dylan Webster	Jason Ginter		Airdrie Curling Club, Airdrie
Karsten Sturmay	Tristan Steinke	Christopher Kennedy	Glenn Venance		Saville Sports Centre, Edmonton
Evan van Amsterdam	Parker Konschuh	Craig Bourgonje	Tyler van Amsterdam		Thistle Curling Club, Edmonton
Daylan Vavrek	Dean Mamer	Carter Lautner	Evan Asmussen	Bradley Chyz	Calgary Curling Club, Calgary
Scott Webb	Dean Darwent	Stephen Byrne	Damien Gnass		Peace River Curling Club, Peace River

== Round-robin standings ==
Final round-robin standings

Key
Teams to Playoffs

Pool A	W	L
Ted Appelman	4	1
Brendan Bottcher	4	1
James Pahl	3	2
Jacob Libbus	2	3
Scott Webb	1	4
Kevin Park	1	4

Pool B	W	L
Karsten Sturmay	4	1
Aaron Sluchinski	4	1
Jeremy Harty	3	2
Evan van Amsterdam	2	3
Daylan Vavrek	2	3
Robert Johnson	0	5

== Round-robin results ==
All draws are listed in Mountain Time (UTC−07:00).

=== Draw 1 ===
Wednesday, February 5, 12:00 pm

Sheet B	1	2	3	4	5	6	7	8	9	10	Final
Karsten Sturmay 🔨	0	2	0	0	0	2	0	3	0	1	8
Evan van Amsterdam	1	0	1	2	1	0	0	0	1	0	6

Sheet C	1	2	3	4	5	6	7	8	9	10	Final
Daylan Vavrek 🔨	0	2	1	0	0	0	0	X	X	X	3
Aaron Sluchinski	1	0	0	3	2	2	1	X	X	X	9

Sheet D	1	2	3	4	5	6	7	8	9	10	Final
Jeremy Harty	0	0	1	0	2	0	1	0	3	2	9
Robert Johnson 🔨	0	2	0	1	0	2	0	1	0	0	6

=== Draw 2 ===
Wednesday, February 5, 6:30 pm

Sheet A	1	2	3	4	5	6	7	8	9	10	Final
Brendan Bottcher 🔨	2	2	0	2	1	0	2	0	1	X	10
Jacob Libbus	0	0	2	0	0	2	0	1	0	X	5

Sheet B	1	2	3	4	5	6	7	8	9	10	11	Final
James Pahl 🔨	3	0	1	0	0	3	0	3	0	0	1	11
Kevin Park	0	2	0	2	2	0	2	0	1	1	0	10

Sheet C	1	2	3	4	5	6	7	8	9	10	Final
Ted Appelman 🔨	1	2	0	2	1	0	1	0	1	X	8
Scott Webb	0	0	2	0	0	1	0	1	0	X	4

=== Draw 3 ===
Thursday, February 6, 9:30 am

Sheet A	1	2	3	4	5	6	7	8	9	10	Final
Daylan Vavrek	0	0	0	0	0	X	X	X	X	X	0
Evan van Amsterdam 🔨	5	1	2	1	1	X	X	X	X	X	10

Sheet B	1	2	3	4	5	6	7	8	9	10	Final
Brendan Bottcher 🔨	2	3	0	2	2	X	X	X	X	X	9
Scott Webb	0	0	2	0	0	X	X	X	X	X	2

Sheet C	1	2	3	4	5	6	7	8	9	10	Final
Jeremy Harty	0	0	0	1	0	1	0	1	0	1	4
Aaron Sluchinski 🔨	0	0	0	0	2	0	2	0	1	0	5

Sheet D	1	2	3	4	5	6	7	8	9	10	Final
Ted Appelman 🔨	0	0	1	0	0	2	0	0	1	0	4
Kevin Park	0	0	0	2	2	0	0	1	0	1	6

=== Draw 4 ===
Thursday, February 6, 2:30 pm

Sheet A	1	2	3	4	5	6	7	8	9	10	Final
James Pahl	1	0	1	0	0	1	0	0	X	X	3
Ted Appelman 🔨	0	2	0	1	1	0	3	1	X	X	8

Sheet B	1	2	3	4	5	6	7	8	9	10	Final
Evan van Amsterdam 🔨	0	1	1	1	0	0	2	0	2	X	7
Robert Johnson	0	0	0	0	0	1	0	2	0	X	3

Sheet C	1	2	3	4	5	6	7	8	9	10	11	Final
Kevin Park 🔨	0	0	2	0	1	0	0	2	0	1	0	6
Jacob Libbus	0	0	0	3	0	0	2	0	1	0	3	9

Sheet D	1	2	3	4	5	6	7	8	9	10	11	Final
Karsten Sturmay	0	1	0	1	0	3	1	0	0	1	0	7
Daylan Vavrek 🔨	2	0	2	0	1	0	0	0	2	0	1	8

=== Draw 5 ===
Thursday, February 6, 6:30 pm

Sheet A	1	2	3	4	5	6	7	8	9	10	11	Final
Aaron Sluchinski	1	0	0	0	2	0	1	3	0	0	2	9
Robert Johnson 🔨	0	3	0	0	0	2	0	0	1	1	0	7

Sheet B	1	2	3	4	5	6	7	8	9	10	Final
Brendan Bottcher	0	0	1	0	3	0	1	0	3	2	10
James Pahl 🔨	2	0	0	2	0	2	0	1	0	0	7

Sheet C	1	2	3	4	5	6	7	8	9	10	Final
Jeremy Harty 🔨	0	0	2	1	0	0	0	0	1	2	6
Karsten Sturmay	0	1	0	0	1	3	1	1	0	0	7

Sheet D	1	2	3	4	5	6	7	8	9	10	Final
Scott Webb	0	1	0	1	1	0	0	1	0	X	4
Jacob Libbus 🔨	0	0	3	0	0	0	3	0	3	X	9

=== Draw 6 ===
Friday, February 7, 9:30 am

Sheet A	1	2	3	4	5	6	7	8	9	10	Final
Kevin Park 🔨	1	0	1	0	0	1	0	2	0	X	5
Scott Webb	0	2	0	3	1	0	1	0	4	X	11

Sheet B	1	2	3	4	5	6	7	8	9	10	11	Final
Ted Appelman	0	0	2	0	2	0	1	0	3	0	2	10
Jacob Libbus 🔨	2	0	0	3	0	1	0	1	0	1	0	8

Sheet C	1	2	3	4	5	6	7	8	9	10	Final
Daylan Vavrek	0	0	3	0	1	0	1	1	0	1	7
Robert Johnson 🔨	1	0	0	2	0	0	0	0	1	0	4

Sheet D	1	2	3	4	5	6	7	8	9	10	Final
Evan van Amsterdam 🔨	0	0	1	0	0	1	0	2	0	X	4
Aaron Sluchinski	2	1	0	1	1	0	1	0	1	X	7

=== Draw 7 ===
Friday, February 7, 2:30 pm

Sheet A	1	2	3	4	5	6	7	8	9	10	Final
Jeremy Harty 🔨	1	0	4	1	0	1	0	1	0	1	9
Evan van Amsterdam	0	1	0	0	2	0	2	0	3	0	8

Sheet B	1	2	3	4	5	6	7	8	9	10	Final
Karsten Sturmay	2	0	2	2	1	0	X	X	X	X	7
Aaron Sluchinski 🔨	0	1	0	0	0	1	X	X	X	X	2

Sheet C	1	2	3	4	5	6	7	8	9	10	Final
James Pahl 🔨	0	5	0	1	0	0	1	1	X	X	8
Scott Webb	1	0	1	0	0	1	0	0	X	X	3

Sheet D	1	2	3	4	5	6	7	8	9	10	Final
Brendan Bottcher 🔨	3	0	0	2	4	X	X	X	X	X	9
Kevin Park	0	0	1	0	0	X	X	X	X	X	1

=== Draw 8 ===
Friday, February 7, 6:30 pm

Sheet A	1	2	3	4	5	6	7	8	9	10	Final
Karsten Sturmay 🔨	0	0	1	1	3	0	3	0	0	X	8
Robert Johnson	0	2	0	0	0	1	0	1	0	X	4

Sheet B	1	2	3	4	5	6	7	8	9	10	Final
Jeremy Harty 🔨	2	0	0	0	4	0	0	2	X	X	8
Daylan Vavrek	0	0	0	1	0	1	1	0	X	X	3

Sheet C	1	2	3	4	5	6	7	8	9	10	Final
Brendan Bottcher	0	1	0	0	1	0	2	1	1	0	6
Ted Appelman 🔨	1	0	1	2	0	3	0	0	0	1	8

Sheet D	1	2	3	4	5	6	7	8	9	10	Final
James Pahl	0	0	1	1	0	4	2	X	X	X	8
Jacob Libbus 🔨	0	1	0	0	1	0	0	X	X	X	2

== Playoffs ==
Page playoff system
A1	Ted Appelman	3
B1	Karsten Sturmay	4
A2	Brendan Bottcher	8
B2	Aaron Sluchinski	4

Semifinal
A1	Ted Appelman	5
A2	Brendan Bottcher	8

Final
B1	Karsten Sturmay	6
A2	Brendan Bottcher	7

=== A2 vs. B2 ===
Saturday, February 8, 2:00 pm

Sheet A	1	2	3	4	5	6	7	8	9	10	Final
Brendan Bottcher	0	0	3	0	0	3	0	1	1	X	8
Aaron Sluchinski 🔨	0	1	0	1	0	0	2	0	0	X	4

=== A1 vs. B1 ===
Saturday, February 8, 6:30 pm

Sheet B	1	2	3	4	5	6	7	8	9	10	11	Final
Ted Appelman	0	0	0	0	0	1	0	1	0	1	0	3
Karsten Sturmay 🔨	0	0	1	0	0	0	1	0	1	0	1	4

=== Semifinal ===
Sunday, February 9, 10:30 am

Sheet C	1	2	3	4	5	6	7	8	9	10	Final
Ted Appelman 🔨	1	0	0	1	0	2	0	0	1	0	5
Brendan Bottcher	0	2	0	0	2	0	2	0	0	2	8

=== Final ===
Sunday, February 9, 4:30 pm

Sheet C	1	2	3	4	5	6	7	8	9	10	Final
Karsten Sturmay 🔨	1	0	1	0	0	2	0	1	1	0	6
Brendan Bottcher	0	1	0	2	2	0	1	0	0	1	7

2020 Boston Pizza Cup

Brendan Bottcher
3rd Alberta Provincial Championship title
