= 2012 Original 16 WCT Bonspiel =

- Host city: Calgary, Alberta
- Arena: Calgary Curling Club
- Dates: November 9–11
- Winner: (Alberta) Steve Petryk
- Skip: Steve Petryk
- Fourth: Dan Petryk
- Second: Roland Robinson
- Lead: Thomas Usselman
- Finalist: (Alberta) Robert Schlender

The 2012 Original 16 WCT Bonspiel was held from November 9 to 11 at the Calgary Curling Club in Calgary, Alberta as part of the 2012–13 World Curling Tour. The event was held in a round robin format, and the purse for the event was CAD$22,000. In the final, Steve Petryk defeated Robert Schlender with a score of 6–3.

== Teams ==
The teams are listed as follows:

Skip	Third	Second	Lead	Locale
Matthew Blandford	Evan Asmussen	Brent Hamilton	Brad Chyz	Calgary, Alberta
Brendan Bottcher	Micky Lizmore	Bradley Thiessen	Karrick Martin	Edmonton, Alberta
Chad Dahlseide	James Wenzel	Jamie Chisholm	Rob Lane	Calgary, Alberta
Don DeLair (fourth)	Greg Hill (skip)	Chris Blackwell	Stephen Jensen	Airdrie, Alberta
Lloyd Hill	Scott Egger	Maurice Sonier	Jim Brooks	Calgary, Alberta
Glen Kennedy	Nathan Connolly	Brandon Klassen	Parker Konschuh	Edmonton, Alberta
Jamie King	Terry Meek	Wade Johnston	Todd Brick	Calgary, Alberta
Jamie Koe	Tom Naugler	Brad Chorostkowski	Rob Borden	Yellowknife, Northwest Territories
Josh Lambden	Morio Kumagawa	Chris McDonah	Andrew Stevenson	Calgary, Alberta
Sean Morris (fourth)	Mike Libbus (skip)	Brad MacInnis	Peter Keenan	Calgary, Alberta
Bert Martin	Lyle Kent	Rhett Friesz	Nathan Relitz	Airdrie, Alberta
Rick McKague	Jim Moats	Doug McNish	Paul Strandlund	Edmonton, Alberta
Darren Moulding	Scott Cruickshank	Shaun Planaden	Kyle Iverson	Calgary, Alberta
David Nedohin	Colin Hodgson	Tom Sallows	Mike Westlund	Edmonton, Alberta
Sean O'Connor	Rob Johnson	Ryan O'Connor	Dan Bubola	Calgary, Alberta
Kevin Park	Shane Park	Josh Burns	Eric Richard	Edmonton, Alberta
Bob Genoway (fourth)	Mickey Pendergast (skip)	Kevin Pendergast	Terry Gair	Calgary, Alberta
Dan Petryk (fourth)	Steve Petryk (skip)	Roland Robinson	Thomas Usselman	Calgary, Alberta
Jon Rennie	Jeff Inglis	Rob Collins	Eric Wasylenko	Calgary, Alberta
Robert Schlender	Dean Ross	Don Bartlett	Chris Lemishka	Edmonton, Alberta
Justin Sluchinski	Aaron Sluchinski	Dylan Webster	Craig Bourgonje	Airdrie, Alberta
Charley Thomas	J. D. Lind	Dominic Daemen	Matthew Ng	Calgary, Alberta
Jeremy Hodges (fourth)	Matt Willerton (skip)	Craig MacAlpine	Chris Evernden	Edmonton, Alberta
Kevin Yablonski	Vance Elder	Harrison Boss	Matthew McDonald	Calgary, Alberta

== Round-robin standings ==
Final round-robin standings

Key
Teams to Playoffs
Teams to Tiebreakers

Pool A	W	L
(Alberta) Charley Thomas	5	0
(Alberta) Rick McKague	4	1
(Alberta) Greg Hill	3	2
(Alberta) Mickey Pendergast	2	3
(Alberta) Glen Kennedy	1	4
(Alberta) Chad Dahlseide	0	4

Pool B	W	L
(Northwest Territories) Jamie Koe	4	1
(Alberta) Sean O'Connor	4	1
(Alberta) Darren Moulding	3	2
(Alberta) David Nedohin	3	2
(Alberta) Lloyd Hill	1	4
(Alberta) Matt Willerton	0	5

Pool C	W	L
(Alberta) Brendan Bottcher	3	2
(Alberta) Bert Martin	3	2
(Alberta) Kevin Park	3	2
(Alberta) Steve Petryk	3	2
(Alberta) Kevin Yablonski	2	3
(Alberta) Justin Sluchinski	1	4

Pool D	W	L
(Alberta) Matthew Blandford	4	1
(Alberta) Robert Schlender	4	1
(Alberta) Jamie King	2	3
(Alberta) Josh Lambden	2	3
(Alberta) Jon Rennie	2	3
(Alberta) Mike Libbus	1	4

== Tiebreakers ==
Team	Final
(Alberta) Brendan Bottcher	4
(Alberta) Kevin Park	3

Team	Final
(Alberta) Bert Martin	3
(Alberta) Steve Petryk	5

== Playoffs ==
The playoffs draw is listed as follows:

Quarterfinals
(Alberta) Charley Thomas	4
(Alberta) Robert Schlender	7
(Northwest Territories) Jamie Koe	6
(Alberta) Brendan Bottcher	5
(Alberta) Steve Petryk	6
(Alberta) Rick McKague	4
(Alberta) Matthew Blandford	6
(Alberta) Sean O'Connor	7

Semifinals
(Alberta) Robert Schlender	8
(Northwest Territories) Jamie Koe	0
(Alberta) Steve Petryk	5
(Alberta) Sean O'Connor	4

Final
(Alberta) Robert Schlender	3
(Alberta) Steve Petryk	6
