= 2019 Boston Pizza Cup =

2019 Alberta Boston Pizza Cup presented by Best Western
- Host city: Edmonton, Alberta
- Arena: Ellerslie Curling Club
- Dates: February 6–10
- Winner: Team Koe
- Curling club: The Glencoe Club, Calgary
- Skip: Kevin Koe
- Third: B. J. Neufeld
- Second: Colton Flasch
- Lead: Ben Hebert
- Finalist: Ted Appelman

The 2019 Alberta Boston Pizza Cup presented by Best Western, the provincial men's curling championship for Alberta, was held from February 6 to 10 at the Ellerslie Curling Club in Edmonton, Alberta. The winning Kevin Koe team represented Alberta at the 2019 Tim Hortons Brier in Brandon, Manitoba.

== Qualification ==
Qualification	Berths	Qualifying team(s)
Defending champion	1	Brendan Bottcher
CTRS leader	1	Kevin Koe
Alberta Tour	2	Karsten Sturmay; Ted Appelman
Medicine Hat Qualifier	3	Scott Garnett; Dale Goehring; Jeremy Harty
Sherwood Park Qualifier	3	James Pahl; Aaron Sluchinski; Warren Cross
Manning Qualifier	2	Daylan Vavrek; Corey Leach

== Teams ==
The teams are listed as follows:

Skip	Third	Second	Lead	Alternate	Club
Brendan Bottcher	Darren Moulding	Bradley Thiessen	Karrick Martin		Saville Sports Centre, Edmonton
Kevin Koe	B. J. Neufeld	Colton Flasch	Ben Hebert		The Glencoe Club, Calgary
Karsten Sturmay	Tristan Steinke	Jason Ginter	Glen Venance		Saville Sports Centre, Edmonton
Ted Appelman	Nathan Connolly	Shawn Donnelly	Adam Enright		Avonair Curling Club, Edmonton
Scott Garnett	Tyler Lautner	Craig Bourgonje	Matthew McDonald		Strathmore Curling Club, Strathmore
Dale Goehring	Jeff Phenix	Fred Edwards	Andrew Brotherhood		The Glencoe Club, Calgary
Jeremy Harty	Kyler Kleibrink	Joel Berger	Kurtis Goller		The Glencoe Club, Calgary
James Pahl	Glen Kennedy	Roland Robinson	Jason Lesmeister		Sherwood Park Curling Club, Sherwood Park / Ellerslie Curling Club, Edmonton
Aaron Sluchinski	Dylan Webster	Eric Richard	Justin Sluchinski		Airdrie Curling Club, Airdrie
Warren Cross	Tyler Pfeiffer	Cody Bartlett	Kendall Warawa		Saville Sports Centre, Edmonton
Daylan Vavrek	Carter Lautner	Rob Maksymetz	Evan Asmussen	Mick Lizmore	Sexsmith Curling Club, Sexsmith
Corey Leach	Rodney Ouellette	Cody Leach	Kyle Leach		Lac La Biche Curling Club, Lac La Biche

== Knockout brackets ==
The draw is listed as follows:

=== A Event ===
A Event
Harty	9
Garnett	3
Pahl	3
Leach	6
Sluchinski	11
Goehring	4
Vavrek	7
Cross	6

Quarterfinals
Koe	3
Harty	6
Leach	5
Appelman	7
Sturmay	6
Sluchinski	7
Vavrek	4
Bottcher	8

Semifinals
Harty	3
Appelman	10
Sluchinski	1
Bottcher	6

A Qualifier
Appelman	10
Bottcher	4

=== B Event ===
B Event
Leach	6
Garnett	8
Sturmay	7
Cross	6
Vavrek	7
Goehring	5
Koe	7
Pahl	1

Quarterfinals
Sluchinski	8
Garnett	9
Harty	7
Sturmay	2
Vavrek	7
Koe	6

Semifinals
Garnett	5
Harty	8
Vavrek	4
Bottcher	12

B Qualifier
Harty	2
Bottcher	9

=== C Event ===
C Event		Semifinals		C1 Qualifier
		Leach	4
Leach	9	Vavrek	9
Cross	1			Vavrek	6
				Koe	7
		Koe	9
		Garnett	2

C Event		Semifinals		C2 Qualifier
Goehring	5
Sluchinski	6	Sluchinski	3
Sturmay	8	Sturmay	9
Pahl	5			Harty	3
				Sturmay	7

== Playoffs ==
Page playoff system
A	Ted Appelman	8
B	Brendan Bottcher	3
C1	Kevin Koe	8
C2	Karsten Sturmay	4

Semifinal
B	Brendan Bottcher	5
C1	Kevin Koe	7

Final
A	Ted Appelman	5
C1	Kevin Koe	9

=== A vs. B ===
February 9, 6:30pm

Sheet C	1	2	3	4	5	6	7	8	9	10	Final
Ted Appelman 🔨	1	0	0	2	1	0	4	X	X	X	8
Brendan Bottcher	0	2	0	0	0	1	0	X	X	X	3

=== C1 vs. C2 ===
February 9, 6:30pm

Sheet A	1	2	3	4	5	6	7	8	9	10	Final
Kevin Koe 🔨	2	1	0	0	2	0	1	0	2	X	8
Karsten Sturmay	0	0	0	1	0	2	0	1	0	X	4

=== Semifinal ===
February 10, 11:00am

Sheet C	1	2	3	4	5	6	7	8	9	10	Final
Brendan Bottcher 🔨	0	0	1	0	0	2	0	0	2	0	5
Kevin Koe	0	1	0	1	1	0	0	3	0	1	7

=== Final ===
February 10, 5:00pm

Sheet C	1	2	3	4	5	6	7	8	9	10	Final
Ted Appelman 🔨	0	1	1	0	0	1	0	2	0	X	5
Kevin Koe	0	0	0	0	1	0	3	0	5	X	9

2019 Boston Pizza Cup

Kevin Koe
6th Alberta Provincial Championship title
