= 2019 Canada Cup =

2019 Home Hardware Canada Cup
- Host city: Leduc, Alberta
- Arena: Sobeys Arena
- Dates: November 27 – December 1
- Men's winner: (Ontario) John Epping
- Curling club: Leaside Curling Club, East York, Toronto
- Skip: John Epping
- Third: Ryan Fry
- Second: Mat Camm
- Lead: Brent Laing
- Finalist: (Alberta) Kevin Koe
- Women's winner: (Ontario) Rachel Homan
- Curling club: Ottawa Curling Club, Ottawa
- Skip: Rachel Homan
- Third: Emma Miskew
- Second: Joanne Courtney
- Lead: Lisa Weagle
- Coach: Marcel Rocque
- Finalist: (Manitoba) Tracy Fleury

The 2019 Home Hardware Canada Cup was held from November 27 – December 1 at Sobeys Arena in Leduc, Alberta. The tournament winners were the first qualifiers for the 2021 Canadian Olympic Curling Trials.

In the men's final, John Epping beat Kevin Koe to win his first Canada Cup. Koe was looking for his third title, having won the event in 2008 and 2015.

In the women's final, Rachel Homan defeated Tracy Fleury to win her second Canada Cup event, her first in 2015. It was Fleury's first Canada Cup playoff appearance with her previous best finish a 2-4 round robin record.

The total purse for the event was $265,000 with the winning teams to receive $40,000.

== Men ==
=== Teams ===
Six teams qualified for the event on September 17. The top-ranked team on the CTRS standings as of November 11 that hasn't previously qualified will also qualify for the event.

Skip	Third	Second	Lead	Alternate	Locale
Brendan Bottcher	Darren Moulding	Brad Thiessen	Karrick Martin		Saville Community Sports Centre, Edmonton, Alberta
Matt Dunstone	Braeden Moskowy	Catlin Schneider	Dustin Kidby	Pat Simmons	Highland Curling Club, Regina, Saskatchewan
John Epping	Ryan Fry	Mat Camm	Brent Laing		Leaside Curling Club, East York, Toronto, Ontario
Brad Gushue	Mark Nichols	Brett Gallant	Geoff Walker		Bally Haly Golf & Curling Club & RE/MAX Centre, St. John's, Newfoundland and Labrador
Glenn Howard	Scott Howard	David Mathers	Tim March		Penetanguishene Curling Club, Toronto, Ontario
Brad Jacobs	Marc Kennedy	E. J. Harnden	Ryan Harnden		Community First Curling Centre, Sault Ste. Marie, Ontario
Kevin Koe	B. J. Neufeld	Colton Flasch	Ben Hebert		The Glencoe Club, Calgary, Alberta

=== Round-robin standings ===
Final round-robin standings

Key
Teams to Playoffs

Skip	W	L	PF	PA	EW	EL	BE	SE	S%
(Alberta) Kevin Koe	5	1	48	33	25	23	4	3	85%
(Alberta) Brendan Bottcher	5	1	39	23	23	17	8	5	84%
(Ontario) John Epping	4	2	40	29	23	23	5	6	82%
(Newfoundland and Labrador) Brad Gushue	3	3	31	38	22	21	5	2	86%
(Ontario) Brad Jacobs	2	4	30	39	21	24	7	3	84%
(Ontario) Glenn Howard	2	4	25	34	19	21	6	2	81%
(Saskatchewan) Matt Dunstone	0	6	25	42	19	23	3	4	82%

=== Round-robin results ===
All times are listed in Mountain Time (UTC−06:00)

==== Draw 1 ====
Wednesday, November 27, 9:00 am

Sheet B	1	2	3	4	5	6	7	8	9	10	Final
(Ontario) John Epping 🔨	0	2	0	2	0	0	0	2	1	0	7
(Alberta) Kevin Koe	0	0	2	0	3	1	1	0	0	1	8

Sheet D	1	2	3	4	5	6	7	8	9	10	Final
(Newfoundland and Labrador) Brad Gushue 🔨	0	1	0	0	2	0	1	0	X	X	4
(Alberta) Brendan Bottcher	1	0	0	3	0	4	0	2	X	X	10

==== Draw 2 ====
Wednesday, November 27, 2:00 pm

Sheet B	1	2	3	4	5	6	7	8	9	10	Final
(Newfoundland and Labrador) Brad Gushue 🔨	0	2	0	2	0	1	0	2	0	2	9
(Saskatchewan) Matt Dunstone	0	0	2	0	1	0	2	0	2	0	7

Sheet E	1	2	3	4	5	6	7	8	9	10	Final
(Ontario) Glenn Howard 🔨	0	1	0	0	1	0	0	1	0	X	3
(Ontario) Brad Jacobs	0	0	0	3	0	0	2	0	1	X	6

==== Draw 3 ====
Wednesday, November 27, 7:00 pm

Sheet B	1	2	3	4	5	6	7	8	9	10	Final
(Alberta) Brendan Bottcher 🔨	0	2	0	0	0	2	0	5	X	X	9
(Ontario) Glenn Howard	0	0	0	2	0	0	1	0	X	X	3

Sheet C	1	2	3	4	5	6	7	8	9	10	Final
(Alberta) Kevin Koe 🔨	2	0	0	3	0	4	0	0	2	X	11
(Ontario) Brad Jacobs	0	2	2	0	1	0	1	1	0	X	7

Sheet D	1	2	3	4	5	6	7	8	9	10	Final
(Saskatchewan) Matt Dunstone	0	0	2	1	0	0	0	1	X	X	4
(Ontario) John Epping 🔨	2	1	0	0	0	4	1	0	X	X	8

==== Draw 4 ====
Thursday, November 28, 9:00 am

Sheet A	1	2	3	4	5	6	7	8	9	10	Final
(Ontario) Brad Jacobs 🔨	2	0	3	0	0	0	0	1	1	X	7
(Saskatchewan) Matt Dunstone	0	2	0	2	1	0	0	0	0	X	5

==== Draw 5 ====
Thursday, November 28, 2:00 pm

Sheet A	1	2	3	4	5	6	7	8	9	10	Final
(Ontario) John Epping	0	0	0	2	0	0	0	3	0	1	6
(Newfoundland and Labrador) Brad Gushue 🔨	1	0	1	0	0	1	0	0	1	0	4

Sheet C	1	2	3	4	5	6	7	8	9	10	Final
(Saskatchewan) Matt Dunstone	0	1	0	1	0	0	0	1	1	0	4
(Alberta) Brendan Bottcher 🔨	0	0	1	0	0	2	0	0	0	2	5

Sheet D	1	2	3	4	5	6	7	8	9	10	Final
(Ontario) Glenn Howard	0	1	0	2	0	1	0	1	0	4	9
(Alberta) Kevin Koe 🔨	1	0	1	0	1	0	1	0	2	0	6

==== Draw 6 ====
Thursday, November 28, 7:00 pm

Sheet A	1	2	3	4	5	6	7	8	9	10	Final
(Alberta) Brendan Bottcher 🔨	0	1	0	0	0	0	1	0	1	0	3
(Alberta) Kevin Koe	0	0	0	0	1	0	0	2	0	2	5

Sheet B	1	2	3	4	5	6	7	8	9	10	Final
(Ontario) Brad Jacobs	0	1	0	1	0	1	0	1	0	X	4
(Ontario) John Epping 🔨	1	0	1	0	4	0	1	0	2	X	9

Sheet E	1	2	3	4	5	6	7	8	9	10	Final
(Newfoundland and Labrador) Brad Gushue 🔨	0	1	0	0	0	0	2	0	1	0	4
(Ontario) Glenn Howard	0	0	0	0	1	0	0	1	0	1	3

==== Draw 7 ====
Friday, November 29, 9:00 am

Sheet C	1	2	3	4	5	6	7	8	9	10	Final
(Ontario) Glenn Howard 🔨	0	1	0	1	0	0	0	0	0	X	2
(Ontario) John Epping	1	0	1	0	1	0	0	3	1	X	7

Sheet D	1	2	3	4	5	6	7	8	9	10	11	Final
(Alberta) Brendan Bottcher 🔨	1	1	0	0	1	0	1	0	0	0	1	5
(Ontario) Brad Jacobs	0	0	2	0	0	1	0	0	0	1	0	4

==== Draw 8 ====
Friday, November 29, 2:00 pm

Sheet C	1	2	3	4	5	6	7	8	9	10	Final
(Ontario) Brad Jacobs	0	0	1	0	1	0	0	0	X	X	2
(Newfoundland and Labrador) Brad Gushue 🔨	0	1	0	3	0	1	0	1	X	X	6

Sheet E	1	2	3	4	5	6	7	8	9	10	Final
(Alberta) Kevin Koe	0	0	2	0	4	0	0	2	X	X	8
(Saskatchewan) Matt Dunstone 🔨	1	0	0	1	0	1	0	0	X	X	3

==== Draw 9 ====
Friday, November 29, 7:00 pm

Sheet A	1	2	3	4	5	6	7	8	9	10	Final
(Saskatchewan) Matt Dunstone	0	0	0	1	0	0	0	1	X	X	2
(Ontario) Glenn Howard 🔨	2	0	1	0	1	0	1	0	X	X	5

Sheet B	1	2	3	4	5	6	7	8	9	10	Final
(Alberta) Kevin Koe 🔨	3	1	0	2	0	1	0	3	X	X	10
(Newfoundland and Labrador) Brad Gushue	0	0	1	0	2	0	1	0	X	X	4

Sheet E	1	2	3	4	5	6	7	8	9	10	Final
(Ontario) John Epping 🔨	0	0	0	0	1	0	2	0	X	X	3
(Alberta) Brendan Bottcher	1	0	2	1	0	1	0	2	X	X	7

=== Playoffs ===
Semifinal			Final
			1	(Alberta) Kevin Koe	4
2	(Alberta) Brendan Bottcher	4	3	(Ontario) John Epping	7
3	(Ontario) John Epping	12

==== Semifinal ====
Saturday, November 30, 2:00 pm

Sheet C	1	2	3	4	5	6	7	8	9	10	Final
(Alberta) Brendan Bottcher 🔨	1	0	0	0	1	0	1	1	0	X	4
(Ontario) John Epping	0	0	4	4	0	1	0	0	3	X	12

Player percentages
(Alberta) Team Bottcher		(Ontario) Team Epping	
Karrick Martin	89%	Brent Laing	99%
Brad Thiessen	90%	Mat Camm	92%
Darren Moulding	85%	Ryan Fry	88%
Brendan Bottcher	68%	John Epping	93%
Total	83%	Total	93%

==== Final ====
Sunday, December 1, 5:00 pm

Sheet C	1	2	3	4	5	6	7	8	9	10	Final
(Alberta) Kevin Koe 🔨	0	0	2	0	1	0	0	1	0	X	4
(Ontario) John Epping	0	0	0	3	0	1	1	0	2	X	7

Player percentages
(Alberta) Team Koe		(Ontario) Team Epping	
Ben Hebert	95%	Brent Laing	100%
Colton Flasch	76%	Mat Camm	91%
B. J. Neufeld	90%	Ryan Fry	78%
Kevin Koe	74%	John Epping	83%
Total	84%	Total	88%

== Women ==
=== Teams ===
Six teams qualified for the event on September 17. The top-ranked team on the CTRS standings as of November 11 that hasn't previously qualified will also qualify for the event.

Skip	Third	Second	Lead	Alternate	Locale
Chelsea Carey	Sarah Wilkes	Dana Ferguson	Rachelle Brown		The Glencoe Club, Calgary, Alberta
Kerri Einarson	Val Sweeting	Shannon Birchard	Briane Meilleur		Gimli Curling Club, Gimli, Manitoba
Tracy Fleury	Selena Njegovan	Liz Fyfe	Kristin MacCuish		East St. Paul Curling Club, East St. Paul, Manitoba
Rachel Homan	Emma Miskew	Joanne Courtney	Lisa Weagle		Ottawa Curling Club, Ottawa, Ontario
Jennifer Jones	Kaitlyn Lawes	Jocelyn Peterman	Dawn McEwen		St. Vital Curling Club, Winnipeg, Manitoba
Cheryl Bernard (Note: Cheryl Bernard replaced Casey Scheidegger, who was due to give birth.)	Cary-Anne McTaggart	Jessie Haughian (Note: Susan O'Connor threw lead stones for Team Scheidegger during Draw 4.)	Kristie Moore	Susan O'Connor	Lethbridge Curling Club, Lethbridge, Alberta
Robyn Silvernagle	Stefanie Lawton	Jessie Hunkin	Kara Thevenot		Twin Rivers Curling Club, North Battleford, Saskatchewan

=== Round-robin standings ===
Final round-robin standings

Key
Teams to Playoffs

Skip	W	L	PF	PA	EW	EL	BE	SE	S%
(Ontario) Rachel Homan	5	1	42	30	27	24	3	7	84%
(Manitoba) Tracy Fleury	5	1	53	30	30	20	3	10	76%
(Alberta) Chelsea Carey	4	2	39	39	26	22	5	7	81%
(Alberta) Team Scheidegger	2	4	33	41	22	23	1	6	80%
(Manitoba) Kerri Einarson	2	4	34	40	20	26	5	3	78%
(Manitoba) Jennifer Jones	2	4	39	47	24	27	0	4	81%
(Saskatchewan) Robyn Silvernagle	1	5	34	47	22	27	4	5	73%

=== Round-robin results ===
All times are listed in Mountain Time (UTC−06:00)

==== Draw 1 ====
Wednesday, November 27, 9:00 am

Sheet C	1	2	3	4	5	6	7	8	9	10	Final
(Saskatchewan) Robyn Silvernagle	0	0	1	0	2	0	1	0	1	X	5
(Ontario) Rachel Homan 🔨	0	1	0	2	0	2	0	3	0	X	8

Sheet E	1	2	3	4	5	6	7	8	9	10	Final
(Manitoba) Jennifer Jones	0	0	2	0	2	0	1	0	1	0	6
(Alberta) Team Scheidegger 🔨	2	1	0	1	0	2	0	2	0	1	9

==== Draw 2 ====
Wednesday, November 27, 2:00 pm

Sheet A	1	2	3	4	5	6	7	8	9	10	Final
(Ontario) Rachel Homan	0	0	1	0	0	1	0	1	1	0	4
(Alberta) Chelsea Carey 🔨	1	1	0	1	1	0	1	0	0	1	6

Sheet C	1	2	3	4	5	6	7	8	9	10	Final
(Manitoba) Jennifer Jones	0	3	0	1	0	0	1	0	X	X	5
(Manitoba) Kerri Einarson 🔨	1	0	2	0	0	2	0	5	X	X	10

Sheet D	1	2	3	4	5	6	7	8	9	10	Final
(Saskatchewan) Robyn Silvernagle 🔨	0	1	0	0	0	2	0	0	X	X	3
(Manitoba) Tracy Fleury	1	0	3	2	2	0	1	4	X	X	13

==== Draw 3 ====
Wednesday, November 27, 7:00 pm

Sheet A	1	2	3	4	5	6	7	8	9	10	Final
(Alberta) Team Scheidegger 🔨	1	0	0	1	0	4	1	X	X	X	7
(Manitoba) Kerri Einarson	0	0	0	0	1	0	0	X	X	X	1

Sheet E	1	2	3	4	5	6	7	8	9	10	Final
(Manitoba) Tracy Fleury 🔨	4	0	2	0	2	0	2	X	X	X	10
(Alberta) Chelsea Carey	0	2	0	2	0	1	0	X	X	X	5

==== Draw 4 ====
Thursday, November 28, 9:00 am

Sheet B	1	2	3	4	5	6	7	8	9	10	Final
(Ontario) Rachel Homan	0	1	0	3	0	2	0	2	2	X	10
(Manitoba) Tracy Fleury 🔨	2	0	1	0	2	0	2	0	0	X	7

Sheet C	1	2	3	4	5	6	7	8	9	10	Final
(Alberta) Chelsea Carey	2	0	0	3	0	1	0	2	1	X	9
(Alberta) Team Scheidegger 🔨	0	1	0	0	2	0	2	0	0	X	5

Sheet E	1	2	3	4	5	6	7	8	9	10	11	Final
(Manitoba) Kerri Einarson 🔨	2	0	0	0	1	0	2	0	2	0	2	9
(Saskatchewan) Robyn Silvernagle	0	1	0	1	0	1	0	3	0	1	0	7

==== Draw 5 ====
Thursday, November 28, 2:00 pm

Sheet B	1	2	3	4	5	6	7	8	9	10	Final
(Saskatchewan) Robyn Silvernagle	1	0	0	0	4	0	0	2	0	0	7
(Manitoba) Jennifer Jones 🔨	0	1	0	0	0	2	2	0	2	2	9

Sheet E	1	2	3	4	5	6	7	8	9	10	Final
(Alberta) Team Scheidegger 🔨	0	0	0	1	0	1	1	0	0	X	3
(Ontario) Rachel Homan	0	3	1	0	2	0	0	1	1	X	8

==== Draw 6 ====
Thursday, November 28, 7:00 pm

Sheet C	1	2	3	4	5	6	7	8	9	10	Final
(Manitoba) Kerri Einarson	1	0	0	1	0	1	0	0	0	X	3
(Manitoba) Tracy Fleury 🔨	0	2	1	0	1	0	2	1	1	X	8

Sheet D	1	2	3	4	5	6	7	8	9	10	Final
(Manitoba) Jennifer Jones 🔨	1	0	3	0	0	3	0	0	3	X	10
(Alberta) Chelsea Carey	0	3	0	1	2	0	0	1	0	X	7

==== Draw 7 ====
Friday, November 29, 9:00 am

Sheet A	1	2	3	4	5	6	7	8	9	10	Final
(Manitoba) Tracy Fleury 🔨	0	1	1	2	0	0	0	2	0	1	7
(Manitoba) Jennifer Jones	0	0	0	0	1	1	1	0	1	0	4

Sheet B	1	2	3	4	5	6	7	8	9	10	Final
(Alberta) Chelsea Carey 🔨	0	2	2	0	0	0	2	0	0	2	8
(Manitoba) Kerri Einarson	1	0	0	2	0	2	0	2	0	0	7

==== Draw 8 ====
Friday, November 29, 2:00 pm

Sheet A	1	2	3	4	5	6	7	8	9	10	Final
(Alberta) Chelsea Carey	0	1	0	1	0	0	1	0	0	1	4
(Saskatchewan) Robyn Silvernagle 🔨	1	0	0	0	0	1	0	1	0	0	3

Sheet B	1	2	3	4	5	6	7	8	9	10	Final
(Manitoba) Tracy Fleury 🔨	0	2	0	0	1	0	2	0	2	1	8
(Alberta) Team Scheidegger	0	0	1	0	0	2	0	2	0	0	5

Sheet D	1	2	3	4	5	6	7	8	9	10	Final
(Manitoba) Kerri Einarson	0	1	0	0	0	0	1	0	2	X	4
(Ontario) Rachel Homan 🔨	1	0	0	1	1	0	0	2	0	X	5

==== Draw 9 ====
Friday, November 29, 7:00 pm

Sheet C	1	2	3	4	5	6	7	8	9	10	Final
(Ontario) Rachel Homan	0	2	0	2	1	0	1	0	0	1	7
(Manitoba) Jennifer Jones 🔨	1	0	1	0	0	1	0	2	0	0	5

Sheet D	1	2	3	4	5	6	7	8	9	10	Final
(Alberta) Team Scheidegger	1	2	0	0	1	0	0	0	X	X	4
(Saskatchewan) Robyn Silvernagle 🔨	0	0	2	1	0	4	1	1	X	X	9

=== Playoffs ===
Semifinal			Final
			1	(Ontario) Rachel Homan	9
2	(Manitoba) Tracy Fleury	9	2	(Manitoba) Tracy Fleury	4
3	(Alberta) Chelsea Carey	4

==== Semifinal ====
Saturday, November 30, 7:00 pm

Sheet C	1	2	3	4	5	6	7	8	9	10	Final
(Manitoba) Tracy Fleury 🔨	3	0	1	1	1	0	1	0	2	X	9
(Alberta) Chelsea Carey	0	1	0	0	0	1	0	2	0	X	4

Player percentages
(Manitoba) Team Fleury		(Alberta) Team Carey	
Kristin MacCuish	82%	Rachelle Brown	90%
Liz Fyfe	76%	Dana Ferguson	86%
Selena Njegovan	90%	Sarah Wilkes	86%
Tracy Fleury	92%	Chelsea Carey	72%
Total	85%	Total	84%

==== Final ====
Sunday, December 1, 12:00 pm

Sheet C	1	2	3	4	5	6	7	8	9	10	Final
(Ontario) Rachel Homan 🔨	1	0	4	0	2	0	1	0	1	X	9
(Manitoba) Tracy Fleury	0	1	0	1	0	1	0	1	0	X	4

Player percentages
(Ontario) Team Homan		(Manitoba) Team Fleury	
Lisa Weagle	88%	Kristin MacCuish	93%
Joanne Courtney	82%	Liz Fyfe	89%
Emma Miskew	88%	Selena Njegovan	68%
Rachel Homan	90%	Tracy Fleury	71%
Total	87%	Total	80%
