= 2018 Boston Pizza Cup =

- Host city: Spruce Grove, Alberta
- Arena: Grant Fuhr Arena
- Dates: 31 January - 4 February
- Winner: Brendan Bottcher
- Curling club: Saville Sports Centre
- Skip: Brendan Bottcher
- Third: Darren Moulding
- Second: Bradley Thiessen
- Lead: Karrick Martin
- Finalist: Karsten Sturmay

The 2018 Boston Pizza Cup was held 31 January to 4 February at the Grant Fuhr Arena in Spruce Grove, Alberta. The winning Brendan Bottcher rink represented Alberta at the 2018 Tim Hortons Brier in Regina, Saskatchewan.

The semifinal and final games were broadcast on Sportsnet One.

== Qualification Method ==
Twelve teams qualified for the provincial tournament through several methods. The qualification process is as follows:

Qualification method	Berths	Qualifying team
Defending Champions	1^{1}	Brendan Bottcher; ~~Kevin Koe~~^{1}
Highest-ranked team on CTRS	1	Aaron Sluchinski
ACF bonspiel points	2^{1}	Karsten Sturmay; Ted Appelman
Peace Qualifier	2	Scott Webb; Daylan Vavrek
Northern Qualifier	3	Thomas Usselman; Mike Hutchings; Charley Thomas
Southern Qualifier	3	Scott Garnett; Kevin Park; Jeremy Harty

1. Because he had competed as Team Canada in the 2017 Tim Hortons Brier, Kevin Koe would also have been eligible for direct entry to the 2018 Boston Pizza Cup as a past provincial/national champion. Had Koe entered, only one team would have qualified via ACF bonspiel points. However, Koe's team withdrew from the 2018 Boston Pizza Cup after qualifying to represent Canada in the 2018 Winter Olympics.

== Teams ==
The teams are as follows:

Skip	Third	Second	Lead	Alternate	Locale(s)
Ted Appelman	Nathan Connolly	Shawn Donnelly	Adam Enright		Spruce Grove Curling Club, Spruce Grove
Brendan Bottcher	Darren Moulding	Bradley Thiessen	Karrick Martin		Saville Community Sports Centre, Edmonton
Scott Garnett	Tyler Lautner	Craig Bourgonje	Matthew McDonald		Calgary Curling Club, Calgary
Jeremy Harty	Kyler Kleibrink	Joel Berger	Gregg Hamilton		The Glencoe Club, Calgary
Mike Hutchings	Roland Robinson	Brian McPherson	Travis Cooper	Kevin Tym	Morinville Curling Club, Morinville
Kevin Park	Shane Park	Robert Collins	Ben Savage	Tony Germsheid	Calgary Curling Club, Calgary
Aaron Sluchinski	Dean Mamer	Justin Sluchinski	Dylan Webster	Cory Nelson	Airdrie Curling Club, Airdrie
Karsten Sturmay	Tristan Steinke	Jason Ginter	Brett Winfield		Saville Community Sports Centre, Edmonton
Charley Thomas	Mick Lizmore	Brandon Klassen	D. J. Kidby	Don Bartlett	Crestwood Curling Club, Edmonton
Thomas Usselman	Aaron Sarafinchan	Morgan Van Doesburg	Tyler Pfeiffer	Colin Davison	Saville Community Sports Centre, Edmonton
Daylan Vavrek	Carter Lautner	Rob Maksymetz	Evan Asmussen		Sexsmith Curling Club, Sexsmith
Scott Webb	Alex Wolfe	Stephen Byrne	Damien Gnass		Peace River Curling Club, Peace River

== Knockout Draw Brackets ==
The draw is listed as follows:

=== A Event ===
First Knockout
Garnett	4
Vavrek	8
Usselman	2
Sturmay	4
Harty	11
Hutchings	10
Park	8
Webb	5

Quarterfinals
Bottcher	9
Vavrek	3
Slushinski	4
Sturmay	7
Appelman	7
Harty	6
Thomas	7
Park	6

Semifinals
Bottcher	10
Sturmay	7
Appelman	5
Thomas	7

Qualifier 1
Bottcher	7
Thomas	6

=== B Event ===
Second Knockout
Garnett	9
Sluchinski	6
Harty	9
Webb	6
Hutchings	3
Park	11
Usselman	6
Vavrek	7

Quarterfinals
Appelman	5
Garnett	3
Sturmay	9
Harty	2
Vavrek	8
Park	6

Semifinals
Appelman	7
Sturmay	8
Vavrek	4
Thomas	5

Qualifier 2
Sturmay	7
Thomas	3

=== C Event ===
Third Knockout		Semifinals		Qualifier 3
		Webb	0
Webb	9	Vavrek	7
Sluchninski	4			Vavrek	9
				Appelman	7
		Appelman	10
		Park	6

Third Knockout		Semifinals		Qualifier 4
Hutchings	7
Garnett	9	Garnett	8
Harty	5	Usselman	5
Usselman	8			Garnett	5
				Thomas	6

== Playoffs ==
Page playoff system
A	Brendan Bottcher	7
B	Karsten Sturmay	6
C1	Daylan Vavrek	7
C2	Charley Thomas	6

Semifinal
B	Karsten Sturmay	7
C1	Daylan Vavrek	5

Final
A	Brendan Bottcher	9
B	Karsten Sturmay	3

=== A vs. B ===
February 3, 6:30pm

Team	1	2	3	4	5	6	7	8	9	10	Final
Brendan Bottcher 🔨	2	1	0	0	1	0	0	1	0	2	7
Karsten Sturmay	0	0	2	0	0	0	2	0	2	0	6

=== C1 vs. C2 ===
February 3, 6:30pm

Team	1	2	3	4	5	6	7	8	9	10	Final
Daylan Vavrek 🔨	2	2	0	0	0	2	0	0	0	1	7
Charley Thomas	0	0	0	0	1	0	3	1	1	0	6

=== Semifinal ===
February 4, 11:00am

Team	1	2	3	4	5	6	7	8	9	10	Final
Karsten Sturmay 🔨	3	0	0	1	0	2	0	0	1	X	7
Daylan Vavrek	0	0	1	0	2	0	1	1	0	X	5

=== Final ===
February 4, 5:00pm

Team	1	2	3	4	5	6	7	8	9	10	Final
Brendan Bottcher 🔨	0	0	2	1	0	4	0	0	2	X	9
Karsten Sturmay	0	1	0	0	1	0	0	1	0	X	3

2018 Boston Pizza Cup

Brendan Bottcher
2nd Alberta Provincial Championship title
