= Boston Pizza Cup =

Curling competition

- Established: 1928
- 2026 host city: Okotoks, Alberta
- 2026 arena: The Murray Arena
- 2026 champion: Kevin Koe

Current edition
- 2026 Alberta Men's Curling Championship

The Boston Pizza Cup is the Alberta provincial championship for men's curling, run by Curling Alberta. The winner represents Team Alberta at the national men's championship, called the Montana's Brier. Currently sponsored by restaurant chain Boston Pizza, under former sponsors, the championship was known as the Alberta Kia Cup and the Safeway Select. Prior to obtaining a title sponsor, the tournament was called the Alberta Tankard.

== Qualification ==
In the current format, twelve teams compete in the provincial tournament. The following teams qualify:

- The defending champion(s) automatically qualify(ies) – either or both the previous year's Boston Pizza Cup winner and/or an Albertan-based "Team Canada" that failed to defend a Brier title the previous year can be entered as a "defending champion." If for whatever reason no defending champion enters the tournament (for example, because they qualified automatically for the Brier as the defending national champion) then an additional Alberta Tour team qualifies as described below;
- The top Albertan team as determined by the Canadian Team Ranking System qualifies – if this team is entered as the defending provincial champion and/or is the defending national champion (or otherwise does not participate) then the next ranked team qualifies, if that team is also qualified (or does not enter) then the next ranked team qualifies, and so on;
- The team(s) with the most Alberta Tour points not already qualified also qualify(ies) – the number of teams that qualify by this method can be one, two or three depending on how many "defending champions" enter;
- The remaining eight spots are determined through the "traditional" route, that is, through zone and district playdowns. As of 2020, four teams qualify from the Southern Zone, three from the Northern Zone and one from Peace River Country.

== Past champions ==
Listed below are the provincial champion skips for each year. Alberta did not participate in the 1927 Brier.

Starting in 2015, teams that win the previous year's Brier have been automatically entered into the national championship as "Team Canada." Any such Albertan-based teams do not participate in that year's provincial championship. Such teams have the right to enter as a "defending champion" in the year following any failed defence of their Brier title, although as of 2020 both teams eligible to qualify in this way so far have declined to enter - Simmons' team disbanded after failing to win the 2016 Brier, while Koe qualified for the Olympics after failing to win the 2017 Brier. Starting in 2018, the top two CTRS teams not otherwise qualified play a "Wild Card Game" for an additional main draw Brier entry.

In another change to the qualifying format, as of 2024, 2 teams (in addition to Team Canada) automatically pre-qualify for the Brier field based on the previous season's Canadian Team Ranking Standings (CTRS), which meant they bypassed the provincial qualifiers. As well, a fourth qualifying team will join the field as the top non-qualified team on the CTRS standings following provincial and territorial playdowns.

*	Won Brier
**	Won World Curling Championships (1959–present)
	No Brier that year

Year	Skip	Winning Club	Other AB Brier Skips^{5}
2026	Kevin Koe	The Glencoe Club	Brad Jacobs^{CA}
2025	Kevin Koe	The Glencoe Club	Brad Jacobs*^{CTRS}
2024	Aaron Sluchinski	Airdrie Curling Club	Brendan Bottcher^{CTRS} Kevin Koe^{CTRS}
2023	Kevin Koe	The Glencoe Club	Brendan Bottcher^{WC} Karsten Sturmay^{WC}
2022	Kevin Koe	The Glencoe Club	Brendan Bottcher^{CA}
2021	Cancelled due to the COVID-19 pandemic in Alberta. Team Brendan Bottcher* represented Alberta (and won) at Brier.		Kevin Koe^{WC}
2020	Brendan Bottcher	Saville Community Sports Centre	Kevin Koe^{CA}
2019	Kevin Koe*	The Glencoe Club	Brendan Bottcher^{WC}
2018	Brendan Bottcher	Saville Sports Centre	None
2017	Brendan Bottcher	Saville Sports Centre	Kevin Koe^{CA}
2016	Kevin Koe**	Glencoe Curling Club	Pat Simmons^{CA}
2015	Kevin Koe^{1}	Glencoe Curling Club	Pat Simmons*^{CA}
2014	Kevin Koe*^{1}	Glencoe Curling Club	
2013	Kevin Martin	Saville Sports Centre	
2012	Kevin Koe	Glencoe Curling Club	
2011	Kevin Martin	Saville Sports Centre	
2010	Kevin Koe**	Saville Sports Centre	
2009	Kevin Martin*	Saville Sports Centre	
2008	Kevin Martin**	Saville Sports Centre	
2007	Kevin Martin	Saville Sports Centre	
2006	Kevin Martin	Saville Sports Centre	
2005	Randy Ferbey**	Granite Curling Club	
2004	Randy Ferbey	Avonair Curling Club	
2003	Randy Ferbey**	Avonair Curling Club	
2002	Randy Ferbey**	Ottewell Curling Club	
2001	Randy Ferbey*	Ottewell Curling Club	
2000	Kevin Martin	Ottewell Curling Club	
1999	Ken Hunka	Ottewell Curling Club	
1998	Tom Reed	Granite Curling Club	
1997	Kevin Martin*	Ottewell Curling Club	
1996	Kevin Martin	Ottewell Curling Club	
1995	Kevin Martin	Ottewell Curling Club	
1994	Ed Lukowich	Calgary Curling Club	
1993	Greg Ferster	Leduc Curling Club	
1992	Kevin Martin	Avonair Curling Club	
1991	Kevin Martin*	Avonair Curling Club	
1990	Harold Breckenridge	North Hill Curling Club	
1989	Pat Ryan**	Ottewell Curling Club	
1988	Pat Ryan*	Ottewell Curling Club	
1987	Pat Ryan	Ottewell Curling Club	
1986	Ed Lukowich**	Calgary Winter Club	
1985	Pat Ryan	Ottewell Curling Club	
1984	Ed Lukowich	Calgary Curling Club	
1983	Ed Lukowich	North Hill Curling Club	
1982	Gary Morken	Grande Prairie Curling Club	
1981	Mel Watchorn	Fairview Curling Club	
1980	Paul Gowsell	Calgary Winter Club	
1979	Paul Devlin	Crestwood Curling Club	
1978	Ed Lukowich*	Medicine Hat Curling Club	
1977	Tom Reed	Crestwood Curling Club	
1976	Wayne Sokolosky	Calgary Curling Club	
1975	Tom Reed	St. Albert Curling Club	
1974	Hec Gervais*	St. Albert Curling Club	
1973	Mel Watchorn	Fairview Curling Club	
1972	Mel Watchorn	Fairview Curling Club	
1971	Matt Baldwin	Derrick Golf & Winter Club	
1970	Hec Gervais	Granite Curling Club	
1969	Ron Northcott**	Calgary Curling Club	
1968	Ron Northcott**	Calgary Curling Club	
1967	Ron Northcott	Calgary Curling Club	
1966	Ron Northcott**	Calgary Curling Club	
1965	Nick Lashuk	Calgary Curling Club	
1964	Ron Northcott	Calgary Curling Club	
1963	Jim Shields	Calgary Curling Club	
1962	Hec Gervais	Alberta Avenue Curling Club	
1961	Hec Gervais**	Alberta Avenue Curling Club	
1960	Stu Beagle	Calgary Curling Club	
1959	Herb Olsen	Edmonton Curling Club	
1958	Matt Baldwin*	Granite Curling Club	
1957	Matt Baldwin*	Granite Curling Club	
1956	Matt Baldwin	Granite Curling Club	
1955	Hugh Brown	Claresholm Curling Club	
1954	Matt Baldwin*	Granite Curling Club	
1953	Len Haw	Glencoe Curling Club	
1952	Art Simpson	Bassano Curling Club	
1951	Bill Gray	Granite Curling Club	
1950	Cliff Manahan	Royal Curling Club	
1949	Stu Beagle	Blackie Curling Club	
1948	Walter McLaws	Glencoe Curling Club	
1947	Howard Palmer	Calgary Curling Club	
1946	Billy Rose*	Sedgewick Curling Club	
1945	Cliff Manahan^{5}	Edmonton Royal Curling Club	
1944	Cliff Manahan^{5}	Edmonton Royal Curling Club	
1943	Cliff Manahan^{5}	Edmonton Royal Curling Club	
1942	John Slavik	Viking Curling Club	
1941	Howard Palmer*	Calgary Curling Club	
1940	Cliff Manahan	Royal Curling Club	
1939	Howard Baker	Calgary Curling Club	
1938	Cliff Manahan	Royal Curling Club	
1937	Cliff Manahan*	Royal Curling Club	
1936	George Wanless	Granite Curling Club	
1935	Robert Alexander	Calgary Curling Club	
1934	Orwell Stewart	Macleod Curling Club	
1933	Cliff Manahan*	Royal Curling Club	
1932	Art Hallonquist	Three Hills Curling Club	
1931	Robert Welliver	Red Deer Curling Club	
1930	Bob Munro	Edmonton Curling Club	
1929	Arnold Johnson	Edmonton Curling Club	
1928	Joe Heartwell	Rosetown Curling Club (SK)	

Notes

1. Koe assembled a new team following his 2014 Brier win, and won the 2015 Boston Pizza Cup after re-qualifying with his new team. His former team, skipped by Pat Simmons, competed in the 2015 and 2016 Briers as Team Canada.
2. Qualified for the Brier as Team Canada.
3. Qualified for the Brier as Wild Card.
4. Qualified for the Brier as either a pre-qualified team, or the top non-qualifying team on the CTRS.
5. Due to World War II, the Brier was not held from 1943 through 1945.
6. Since there was neither a Team Canada nor a Wild Card in the 2014 or prior Briers it was not possible for more than one Albertan team to play in those tournaments, therefore this column is left blank for 2014 and all prior years.
