= 2017 Boston Pizza Cup =

- Host city: Westlock, Alberta
- Arena: Rotary Spirit Centre
- Dates: February 8–12
- Winner: Brendan Bottcher
- Curling club: Saville Sports Centre
- Skip: Brendan Bottcher
- Third: Darren Moulding
- Second: Brad Thiessen
- Lead: Karrick Martin
- Finalist: Ted Appelman

The 2017 Boston Pizza Cup was held from February 8 to 12 at the Rotary Spirit Centre in Westlock, Alberta.

== Qualification process ==
Twelve teams qualified for the provincial tournament through several methods. The qualification process is as follows:

Qualification method	Berths	Qualifying team
Defending champions^{1}	N/A^{1}	~~Kevin Koe~~^{1} ~~Pat Simmons~~^{1}
Highest-ranked team on CTRS	1	Charley Thomas
Next-ranked team on CTRS not already qualified^{1}	1	Brendan Bottcher
Alberta Curling Federation bonspiel points	2	Mick Lizmore; Ted Appelman
Peace Curling Association qualifier (Jan. 6–8)	2	Roland Robinson; Graham Powell
Northern Alberta Curling Association qualifier (Jan. 19–22)	3	Thomas Scoffin; Jamie King; James Pahl
Southern Alberta Curling Association qualifier (Jan. 20–23)	3	Josh Lameden; Aaron Sluchniski; Jeremy Harty

Notes

1. The defending champion usually receives the first berth, however the defending champion from 2016, Kevin Koe, won the 2016 Tim Hortons Brier and therefore entered the 2017 Brier as Team Canada, negating any need for him to compete in the Boston Pizza Cup. In addition, 2015 Brier champion Pat Simmons, who had competed as Team Canada in 2015 and 2016 with the team Koe won the 2014 Boston Pizza Cup and Brier titles with, would also have been eligible for direct entry into the 2017 Boston Pizza Cup as a past provincial/national champion. However, Simmons' team disbanded after the 2015-16 curling season and forfeited their berth. Had Koe and Simmons both entered the 2017 Boston Pizza Cup, only one team would have qualified via the ACF bonspiel route. Instead, the next-ranked team on the CTRS was granted automatic entry.

== Teams ==
Skip	Third	Second	Lead	Locale(s)
Ted Appelman	Tom Appelman	Shawn Donnelly	Adam Enright	Saville Sports Centre, Edmonton
Brendan Bottcher	Darren Moulding	Brad Thiessen	Karrick Martin	Saville Sports Centre, Edmonton
Jeremy Harty	Dylan Webster	Joel Berger	Gregg Hamilton	The Glencoe Club, Calgary
Glen Kennedy (fourth)	Jamie King (skip)	Sean Morris	Todd Brick	Ellerslie Curling Club, Edmonton
Josh Lambden	Chris McDonah	Robert Collins	Colin Stroeder	Calgary Curling Club, Calgary
Mick Lizmore	Daylan Vavrek	Carter Lautner	Brad Chyz	Sexsmith Curling Club, Sexsmith; Saville Sports Centre, Edmonton
James Pahl	Mark Klinck	Aaron Bartling	Thomas Stroh	Thistle Curling Club, Edmonton
Graham Powell	Tom Sallows	Jordan Steinke	Chris Wall	Grande Prairie Curling Club, Grande Prairie
Roland Robinson	Jeff Erickson	Ryan Konowalyk	James Knievel	Manning Curling Club, Manning
Thomas Scoffin	Tristan Steinke	Jason Ginter	Brett Winfield	Saville Sports Centre, Edmonton
Aaron Sluchinski	Justin Sluchinski	Eric Richard	Kyle Richard	Airdrie Curling Club, Airdrie
Charley Thomas	Nathan Connolly	Brandon Klassen	Craig Savill	The Glencoe Club, Calgary; Crestwood Curling Club, Edmonton

== Knockout Draw Brackets ==
The draw is listed as follows:https://web.archive.org/web/20170211081254/http://www.2017bostonpizzacup.com/default.aspx?p=draw

=== A Event ===
First Knockout
James Pahl	6
Josh Lambden	2
Thomas Scoffin	6
Roland Robinson	4
Jamie King	3
Jeremy Harty	10
Aaron Sluchninski	7
Graham Powell	3

Quarterfinals
Charley Thomas	6
James Pahl	4
Thomas Scoffin	6
Mick Lizmore	7
Ted Appelman	8
Jeremy Harty	6
Aaron Slushinski	5
Brendan Bottcher	8

Semifinals
Charley Thomas	6
Mick Lizmore	7
Ted Appelman	3
Brendan Bottcher	9

Qualifier 1
Mick Lizmore	5
Brendan Bottcher	6

=== B Event ===
Second Knockout
Josh Lambden	2
Thomas Scoffin	5
Jeremy Harty	9
Graham Powell	1
Jamie King	3
Aaron Slushninski	7
Roland Robinson	5
James Pahl	9

Quarterfinals
Ted Appelman	6
Thomas Scoffin	10
Jeremy Harty	6
Charley Thomas	9
Aaron Slushninski	3
James Pahl	6

Semifinals
Thomas Scoffin	7
Charley Thomas	9
Mick Lizmore	6
James Pahl	4

Qualifier 2
Charley Thomas	10
Mick Lizmore	6

=== C Event ===
Third Knockout		Semifinals		Qualifier 3
		Josh Lambden	2
Graham Powell	4	James Pahl	7
Josh Lambden	7			James Pahl	5
				Aaron Sluchninski	9
		Aaron Sluchninski	5
		Thomas Scoffin	4

Third Knockout		Semifinals		Qualifier 4
Jamie King	8
Ted Appelman	10	Ted Appelman	7
Roland Robinson	5	Jeremy Harty	3
Jeremy Harty	7			Ted Appelman	7
				Mick Lizmore	6

== Playoffs ==
Page playoff system
A	Brendan Bottcher	8
B	Charley Thomas	3
C1	Aaron Sluchniski	6
C2	Ted Appelman	10

Semifinal
B	Charley Thomas	6
C2	Ted Appelman	8

Final
A	Brendan Bottcher	6
C2	Ted Appelman	5

=== A vs. B ===
Saturday, February 11, 6:30 pm

Sheet C	1	2	3	4	5	6	7	8	9	10	Final
Brendan Bottcher 🔨	3	0	2	0	1	1	0	1	X	X	8
Charley Thomas	0	2	0	0	0	0	1	0	X	X	3

=== C1 vs. C2 ===
Saturday, February 11, 6:30 pm

Sheet A	1	2	3	4	5	6	7	8	9	10	Final
Aaron Sluchninski 🔨	0	2	0	2	0	0	0	1	1	0	6
Ted Appelman	0	0	2	0	2	2	1	0	0	3	10

=== Semifinal ===
Sunday, February 12, 11:00 am

Sheet C	1	2	3	4	5	6	7	8	9	10	Final
Charley Thomas 🔨	0	0	2	0	0	0	2	0	2	0	6
Ted Appelman	0	0	0	0	4	1	0	2	0	1	8

=== Final ===
Sunday, February 12, 4:00 pm

Sheet C	1	2	3	4	5	6	7	8	9	10	11	Final
Brendan Bottcher 🔨	0	1	0	0	1	1	0	1	1	0	1	6
Ted Appelman	0	0	0	2	0	0	1	0	0	2	0	5

2017 Boston Pizza Cup

Brendan Bottcher
1st Alberta Provincial Championship title
