= McKee Homes Fall Curling Classic =

Curling sport event in Canada

- Established: 2013
- Host city: Airdrie, Alberta
- Arena: Airdrie Curling Club
- Purse: $15,000

Current champions (2026)
- Men: (Japan) Kohsuke Hirata
- Women: (South Korea) Ha Seung-youn

Location in Canada

The McKee Homes Fall Curling Classic is an annual bonspiel on the men's and women's Curling Alberta Tour. It is a former World Curling Tour event. It is held annually in October at the Airdrie Curling Club in Airdrie, Alberta.

For most of its history, the bonspiel only had a men's event. A women's event was added in 2025.

The purse for the event is $15,000.

== Past champions ==
=== Men's ===
Year	Winning team	Runner up team	Purse (CAD)	Winner's share
2013	(Alberta) Matthew Blandford, Darren Moulding, Brent Hamilton, Brad Chyz	(Alberta) Josh Lambden, Morio Kumagawa, Chris McDonah, Andrew Stevenson	$13,500	$4,000
2014	(Alberta) Aaron Sluchinski, Justin Sluchinski, Dylan Webster, Eric Richard	(Alberta) Cam Culp, Chris Hanson, Richard Grant, Steven Metzger	$13,500	$4,000
2015	(Alberta) Aaron Sluchinski, Justin Sluchinski, Dylan Webster, Eric Richard	(Alberta) Kevin Yablonski, Michael Roy, Scott Garnett, Matthew McDonald	$14,000	$4,000
2016	(Alberta) Glen Hansen, Dean Ross, Don Bartlett, George Parsons	(Alberta) Aaron Sluchinski, Justin Sluchinski, Eric Richard, Kyle Richard	$12,000	$3,200
2017	(Alberta) Kevin Park, Shane Park, Robert Collins, Ben Savage	(Alberta) Aaron Sluchinski, Dean Mamer, Kerr Drummond, Dylan Webster	$12,800	$3,200
2018	(Alberta) Jeremy Harty, Kyler Kleibrink, Joel Berger, Kurtis Goller	(Alberta) Terry Meek, Ralph Brust, Greg Northcott, Peter Innes	$12,800	$3,400
2019	(Alberta) Jeremy Harty, Kyler Kleibrink, Joel Berger, Kurtis Goller	(Russia) Sergei Glukhov, Dmitry Mironov, Evgeny Klimov, Anton Kalalb	$12,800	$3,400
2020	(Alberta) Ryan Jacques, Desmond Young, Andrew Gittis, Gabriel Dyck	(Alberta) Karsten Sturmay, Tristan Steinke, Chris Kennedy, Glenn Venance	$12,800	$3,400
2021	(Alberta) Warren Cross, Tyler Pfiffer, Morgan Van Doesburg, Mike Lambert	(Alberta) Colton Goller, Warren Kozak, James Keats, Dwayne Romanchuk	$9,600	$3,000
2022	(Alberta) Karsten Sturmay, Kyle Doering, Kurtis Goller, Glenn Venance, J. D. Lind	(Alberta) Ryan Parent, Zachary Pawliuk, Tyler Powell, John Ritchie	$9,600	$3,200
2023	(China) Fei Xueqing, Guan Tianqi, Li Zhichao, Xie Xingyin	(Alberta) Ryan Parent, James Ballance, Tyler Powell, John Ritchie	$12,000	$3,200
2024	(Alberta) Ryan Jacques, Ryan Parent, Jordan Tardi, Ethan Drysdale	(New Zealand) Anton Hood, Brett Sargon, Ben Smith, Hunter Walker	$12,000	$3,200
2025	(Alberta) Darren Moulding, Kyler Kleibrink, Andrew Nerpin, Evan Crough	(Alberta) Tyler Powell, Ky Macaulay, Tyler Pelkey, Mark Wood	$15,000	$4,000
2026	(Japan) Go Aoki (Fourth), Shingo Usui, Takeshi Aoyanagi, Kohsuke Hirata (Skip)	(Alberta) Darren Moulding, Kyler Kleibrink, Andrew Nerpin, Evan Crough	$15,000	$4,000

=== Women's ===
Year	Winning team	Runner up team	Purse (CAD)	Winner's share
2025	(Alberta) Serena Gray-Withers, Catherine Clifford, Lindsey Burgess, Zoe Cinnamon	(South Korea) Park You-been, Lee Eun-chae, Kim Ji-yoon, Yang Seung-hee	$15,000	$4,000
2026	(South Korea) Ha Seung-youn, Kim Hye-rin, Kim Cho-hi, Kim Seon-yeong	(South Korea) Kim Eun-jung, Park Han-byul, Kim Su-hyeon, Kim Hae-jeong	$15,000	$4,000
