= 2020 Continental Cup =

2020 OK Tire & BKT Tires Continental Cup
- Host city: London, Ontario
- Arena: Western Fair Sports Centre
- Dates: January 9–12
- Winner: Team Europe
Score Breakdown
Discipline	Canada	Europe
Draw 1 - Teams	1	2
Draw 2 - Mixed Doubles	1	2
Draw 3 - Teams	0	3
Draw 4 - Team Scramble	1.5	1.5
Draw 5 - Mixed Doubles	1	2
Draw 6 - Team Scramble	0.5	2.5
Draw 7 - Mixed Scramble	1	2
Draw 8 - Mixed Doubles	0.5	2.5
Draw 9 - Mixed Scramble	0	3
Draw 10 - Skins	9	6
Draw 11 - Skins	7	11
Total	22.5	37.5

The 2020 Continental Cup of Curling was held from January 9 to 12 at the Western Fair Sports Centre in London, Ontario. The Continental Cup is a curling competition pitting Team Canada against Team Europe in a series of team events, mixed doubles events, and skins competitions.

Team Europe won and collected CAD$135,000 prize money, while Team Canada collected CAD$67,500.

== Teams ==
Six teams from each region will compete:

Team	Skip	Third	Second	Lead	Locale
Team; Canada	Chelsea Carey	Sarah Wilkes	Dana Ferguson	Rachel Brown	Calgary, Alberta
Team; Canada	Tracy Fleury	Selena Njegovan	Liz Fyfe	Kristin MacCuish	East St. Paul, Manitoba
Team; Canada	Rachel Homan	Emma Miskew	Joanne Courtney	Lisa Weagle	Ottawa, Ontario
Team; Canada	Brendan Bottcher	Darren Moulding	Brad Thiessen	Karrick Martin	Edmonton, Alberta
Team; Canada	John Epping	Ryan Fry	Mat Camm	Brent Laing	Toronto, Ontario
Team; Canada	Kevin Koe	B.J. Neufeld	Colton Flasch	Ben Hebert	Calgary, Alberta
Team; Canada	Coach: Jeff Stoughton, Assistant coach: Heather Nedohin, Captain: David Nedohin				
Team; Europe (European Union)	Anna Hasselborg	Sara McManus	Agnes Knochenhauer	Sofia Mabergs	Sundbyberg, Sweden
Team; Europe (European Union)	Eve Muirhead	Lauren Gray	Jennifer Dodds	Vicky Wright	Stirling, Scotland
Team; Europe (European Union)	Alina Pätz (Fourth)	Silvana Tirinzoni (Skip)	Esther Neuenschwander	Melanie Barbezat	Aarau, Switzerland
Team; Europe (European Union)	Benoît Schwarz (Fourth)	Sven Michel	Peter de Cruz (Skip)	Valentin Tanner	Geneva, Switzerland
Team; Europe (European Union)	Niklas Edin	Oskar Eriksson	Rasmus Wranå	Christoffer Sundgren	Karlstad, Sweden
Team; Europe (European Union)	Bruce Mouat	Grant Hardie	Bobby Lammie	Hammy McMillan	Edinburgh, Scotland
Team; Europe (European Union)	Coach: David Murdoch, Assistant coach: Christoffer Svae,Captain: Fredrik Lindberg				

== Results ==
All times listed are in Eastern Standard Time (UTC−5).

=== Thursday, January 9 ===
==== Draw 1 ====
Team 9:30 am

Sheet A	1	2	3	4	5	6	7	8	Final	Points
Canada (Homan)	0	2	0	2	0	1	0	1	6	1
Europe (Tirinzoni) 🔨	1	0	1	0	2	0	1	0	5	0

Sheet B	1	2	3	4	5	6	7	8	Final	Points
Canada (Bottcher)	0	2	0	2	0	1	0	X	5	0
Europe (Edin) 🔨	1	0	2	0	2	0	2	X	7	1

Sheet C	1	2	3	4	5	6	7	8	Final	Points
Canada (Fleury)	0	1	0	0	3	0	X	X	4	0
Europe (Muirhead) 🔨	1	0	3	4	0	3	X	X	11	1

==== Draw 2 ====
Mixed Doubles 2:00 pm

Sheet A	1	2	3	4	5	6	7	8	Final	Points
Canada (MacCuish / Moulding)	0	3	0	1	0	0	0	X	4	0
Europe (Pätz / Michel) 🔨	1	0	1	0	3	2	3	X	10	1

Sheet B	1	2	3	4	5	6	7	8	Final	Points
Canada (Miskew / Flasch) 🔨	0	0	2	0	1	0	3	0	6	0
Europe (Mabergs / Edin)	1	1	0	2	0	1	0	5	10	1

Sheet C	1	2	3	4	5	6	7	8	Final	Points
Canada (Wilkes / Thiessen) 🔨	2	3	0	0	2	0	3	X	10	1
Europe (Wright / Hardie)	0	0	1	1	0	2	0	X	4	0

==== Draw 3 ====
Team 7:30 pm

Sheet A	1	2	3	4	5	6	7	8	Final	Points
Canada (Epping)	0	1	0	1	0	3	0	X	5	0
Europe (Mouat) 🔨	3	0	1	0	2	0	3	X	9	1

Sheet B	1	2	3	4	5	6	7	8	Final	Points
Canada (Carey)	0	1	0	1	0	0	1	X	3	0
Europe (Hasselborg) 🔨	0	0	4	0	1	1	0	X	6	1

Sheet C	1	2	3	4	5	6	7	8	Final	Points
Canada (Koe)	0	1	0	0	2	0	2	1	6	0
Europe (de Cruz) 🔨	2	0	2	2	0	1	0	0	7	1

=== Friday, January 10 ===
==== Draw 4 ====
Team Scramble 9:30 am

Sheet A	1	2	3	4	5	6	7	8	Final	Points
Canada (Fleury / Miskew / Fyfe / Weagle)	0	0	3	0	2	0	1	0	6	0.5
Europe (Tirinzoni / McManus / Neuenschwander / Mabergs) 🔨	1	0	0	3	0	1	0	1	6	0.5

Sheet B	1	2	3	4	5	6	7	8	Final	Points
Canada (Bottcher / Fry / Thiessen / Hebert) 🔨	0	0	0	1	0	2	0	X	3	0
Europe (Edin / Hardie / Wranå / McMillan)	1	2	1	0	2	0	1	X	7	1

Sheet C	1	2	3	4	5	6	7	8	Final	Points
Canada (Homan / Wilkes / Courtney / Brown)	0	2	0	1	0	2	0	1	6	1
Europe (Muirhead / Pätz / Dodds / Barbezat) 🔨	1	0	2	0	1	0	1	0	5	0

==== Draw 5 ====
Mixed Doubles 2:00 pm

Sheet A	1	2	3	4	5	6	7	8	Final	Points
Canada (Ferguson / Bottcher) 🔨	1	0	1	0	0	1	1	1	5	1
Europe (Tirinzoni / Schwarz)	0	1	0	2	0	0	0	0	3	0

Sheet B	1	2	3	4	5	6	7	8	Final	Points
Canada (Fleury / Laing)	0	1	1	0	0	2	0	X	4	0
Europe (Hasselborg / Eriksson) 🔨	4	0	0	2	1	0	2	X	9	1

Sheet C	1	2	3	4	5	6	7	8	Final	Points
Canada (Carey / Camm)	0	1	0	1	0	2	0	X	4	0
Europe (Dodds / Mouat) 🔨	3	0	4	0	1	0	2	X	10	1

==== Draw 6 ====
Team Scramble 7:30 pm

Sheet A	1	2	3	4	5	6	7	8	Final	Points
Canada (Koe / Moulding / Flasch / Laing) 🔨	0	0	0	0	1	1	1	0	3	0.5
Europe (Schwarz / Eriksson / de Cruz / Sundgren)	1	1	0	0	0	0	0	1	3	0.5

Sheet B	1	2	3	4	5	6	7	8	Final	Points
Canada (Carey / Njegovan / Ferguson / MacCuish) 🔨	0	0	0	1	0	0	X	X	1	0
Europe (Hasselborg / Gray / Knochenhauer / Wright)	1	1	2	0	2	1	X	X	7	1

Sheet C	1	2	3	4	5	6	7	8	Final	Points
Canada (Epping / Neufeld / Camm / Martin) 🔨	0	2	0	1	0	0	0	0	3	0
Europe (Mouat / Michel / Lammie / Tanner)	0	0	1	0	0	1	1	1	4	1

=== Saturday, January 11 ===
==== Draw 7 ====
Mixed Scramble (Male Skips) 9:30 am

Sheet A	1	2	3	4	5	6	7	8	Final	Points
Canada (Epping / Njegovan / Camm / MacCuish) 🔨	1	0	0	0	2	0	3	0	6	0.5
Europe (Schwarz / Tirinzoni / de Cruz / Barbezat)	0	0	1	0	0	3	0	2	6	0.5

Sheet B	1	2	3	4	5	6	7	8	Final	Points
Canada (Koe / Miskew / Flasch / Weagle) 🔨	0	0	2	0	1	0	1	0	4	0.5
Europe (Edin / McManus / Wranå / Mabergs)	0	1	0	1	0	0	0	2	4	0.5

Sheet C	1	2	3	4	5	6	7	8	Final	Points
Canada (Bottcher / Wilkes / Thiessen / Brown)	0	1	0	0	0	0	0	X	1	0
Europe (Mouat / Gray / Lammie / Wright) 🔨	1	0	0	1	1	2	2	X	7	1

==== Draw 8 ====
Mixed Doubles 2:00 pm

Sheet A	1	2	3	4	5	6	7	8	Final	Points
Canada (Weagle / Epping) 🔨	1	1	0	2	0	0	0	X	4	0
Europe (Barbezat / de Cruz)	0	0	3	0	2	2	1	X	8	1

Sheet B	1	2	3	4	5	6	7	8	Final	Points
Canada (Njegovan / Neufeld)	4	1	0	0	1	0	1	0	7	0.5
Europe (Knochenhauer / Wranå) 🔨	0	0	1	1	0	2	0	3	7	0.5

Sheet C	1	2	3	4	5	6	7	8	Final	Points
Canada (Homan / Hebert)	0	0	1	0	1	0	X	X	2	0
Europe (Muirhead / Lammie) 🔨	4	3	0	2	0	1	X	X	10	1

==== Draw 9 ====
Mixed Scramble (Female Skips) 7:30 pm

Sheet A	1	2	3	4	5	6	7	8	Final	Points
Canada (Fleury / Moulding / Fyfe / Laing)	0	1	0	1	1	0	0	0	3	0
Europe (Pätz / Michel / Neuenschwander / Tanner) 🔨	2	0	0	0	0	3	1	1	7	1

Sheet B	1	2	3	4	5	6	7	8	Final	Points
Canada (Homan / Neufeld / Courtney / Hebert)	1	0	2	0	1	0	0	X	4	0
Europe (Hasselborg / Eriksson / Knochenhauer / Sundgren) 🔨	0	2	0	3	0	2	2	X	9	1

Sheet C	1	2	3	4	5	6	7	8	Final	Points
Canada (Carey / Fry / Ferguson / Martin) 🔨	2	1	0	0	2	0	0	X	5	0
Europe (Muirhead / Hardie / Dodds / McMillan)	0	0	3	4	0	2	2	X	11	1

=== Sunday, January 12 ===
==== Draw 10 ====
Skins 2:00 pm

Values (points)	½	½	½	½	½	½	1	1	5
Sheet A	1	2	3	4	5	6	7	8	Total
Canada (Epping) 🔨		✓	✓		–	✓		✓	4.5
Europe (Mouat)	✓			–			–		0.5

Values (points)	½	½	½	½	½	½	1	1	5
Sheet B	1	2	3	4	5	6	7	8	Total
Canada (Neufeld / Njegovan / Hebert / Fyfe)			–		✓		–	✓	3.5
Europe (Edin / McManus / Wranå / Knochenhauer) 🔨	✓	✓		–		✓			1.5

Values (points)	½	½	½	½	½	½	1	1	5
Sheet C	1	2	3	4	5	6	7	8	Total
Canada (Carey)		–	✓		–		–		1
Europe (Tirinzoni) 🔨	✓			✓		–		✓	4

==== Draw 11 ====
Skins 7:00 pm

Values (points)	½	½	½	½	1	1	1	1	6
Sheet A	1	2	3	4	5	6	7	8	Total
Canada (Bottcher)			–		✓		✓		2
Europe (de Cruz) 🔨	–	✓		✓		✓		✓	4

Values (points)	½	½	½	½	1	1	1	1	6
Sheet B	1	2	3	4	5	6	7	8	Total
Canada (Koe / Fleury / Flasch / MacCuish) 🔨	–		–		–			✓	1
Europe (Eriksson / Hasselborg / Sundgren / Mabergs)		✓		✓		✓	✓		5

Values (points)	½	½	½	½	1	1	1	1	6
Sheet C	1	2	3	4	5	6	7	8	Total
Canada (Homan)		✓	✓		–	✓		✓	4
Europe (Muirhead) 🔨	✓			✓			✓		2
