= 2010 Boston Pizza Cup =

- Host city: Olds, Alberta
- Arena: Olds Sportsplex
- Dates: February 3–7
- Winner: Kevin Koe
- Curling club: Saville Sports Centre, Edmonton
- Skip: Kevin Koe
- Third: Blake MacDonald
- Second: Carter Rycroft
- Lead: Nolan Thiessen
- Finalist: Randy Ferbey

The 2010 Boston Pizza Cup was held February 3–7 at the Olds Sportsplex in Olds, Alberta. The winner, team Kevin Koe, represented Alberta at the 2010 Tim Hortons Brier in Halifax, Nova Scotia. Team Koe would eventually go on to win the Brier and capture the 2010 Capital One World Men's Curling Championship.

Although his team would have been entered automatically as the defending provincial champion, Kevin Martin did not compete because his team had won the 2009 Canadian Olympic Curling Trials and qualified for the 2010 Winter Olympics in Vancouver which started shortly after the Boston Pizza Cup. As a result, 2009 runner-up Randy Ferbey was entered as the defending champion.

== Teams ==
Skip	Third	Second	Lead	Curling club
Ted Appelman	Tom Appelman	Brandon Klassen	Brendan Melnyk	Saville Sports Centre, Edmonton
Rob Armitage	Shawn Meachem	Trevor Sparks	Doug Stambaugh	Red Deer Curling Club, Red Deer
Adrian Bakker	Sterling Hansen	Matt Ng	Brad Kokoroyannis	Calgary Curling Club, Calgary
Kurt Balderston	Les Sonnenberg	Geoff Walker	Del Shaughnessy	Sexsmith Curling Club, Sexsmith
Brent Bawel	Dan Petryk	Sean O'Connor	Jason Lesmeister	Calgary Curling Club, Calgary
Kelsey Dusseault	Chris Wall	Allen Schudlo	Dan Boorse	Sexsmith Curling Club, Sexsmith
David Nedohin	Randy Ferbey (skip)	Scott Pfeifer	Marcel Rocque	Saville Sports Centre, Edmonton
Warren Hassall	Barry Chwedoruk	Scott Manners	Chris Hassall	Lloydminster Curling Club, Lloydminster
Kevin Koe	Blake MacDonald	Carter Rycroft	Nolan Thiessen	Saville Sports Centre, Edmonton
James Pahl	Mark Klinck	Roland Robinson	Don Bartlett	Sherwood Park Curling Club, Sherwood Park
Wade White	Kevin Tym	Brian McPherson	George White	Saville Sports Centre, Edmonton
Ben Wilkinson	Chris Lemishka	Jessi Wilkinson	Julian Sawiak	Whitecourt Curling Club, Whitecourt

== Draw Brackets ==
=== A Event ===
Round of 16
Brent Bawel	8
Rob Armitage	9
Kurt Balderston	10
Kelsey Dusseault	2
Warren Hassall	5
Ben Wilkinson	4
Wade White	11
Adrian Bakker	5

Quarterfinals
Randy Ferbey	9
Rob Armitage	2
Kurt Balderston	8
James Pahl	9
Ted Appelman	6
Warren Hassall	4
Wade White	5
Kevin Koe	6

Semifinals
Randy Ferbey	8
James Pahl	7
Ted Appelman	4
Kevin Koe	6

A Qualifier
Randy Ferbey	8
Kevin Koe	10

=== B Event ===
Round of 16
Brent Bawel	8
Kurt Balderston	3
Warren Hassall	6
Kelsey Dusseault	4
Ben Wilkinson	10
Wade White	8
Adrian Bakker	4
Rob Armitage	9

Quarterfinals
Brent Bawel	9
Ted Appelman	8
Warren Hassall	8
James Pahl	7
Ben Wilkinson	2
Rob Armitage	6

Semifinals
Brent Bawel	3
Warren Hassall	10
Rob Armitage	7
Randy Ferbey	8

B Qualifier
Warren Hassall	5
Randy Ferbey	9

=== C Event ===
Quarterfinals		Semifinals		C Qualifier
		Kurt Balderston	8
Kelsey Dusseault	2	Rob Armitage	8
Kurt Balderston	9			Rob Armitage	3
				Brent Bawel	10
		Ben Wilkinson	3
		Brent Bawel	12

Quarterfinals		Semifinals		C Qualifier
Ted Appelman	7
Wade White	3	Ted Appelman	7
James Pahl	7	James Pahl	2
Adrian Bakker	4			Ted Appelman	8
				Warren Hassall	7

== Playoffs ==
Page playoff system
A	Kevin Koe	10
B	Randy Ferbey	6
C1	Brent Bawel	6
C2	Ted Appelman	8

Semifinal
B	Randy Ferbey	6
C2	Ted Appelman	4

Final
A	Kevin Koe	7
B	Randy Ferbey	5
