= Rollie Robinson =

Canadian curler (born 1985)

Roland Robinson
- Curler
- Born: June 11, 1985 (age 41); Grimshaw, Alberta

Team
- Curling club: Yellowknife CC, Yellowknife
- Skip: Jamie Koe
- Third: Glen Kennedy
- Second: Roland Robinson
- Lead: Shadrach Mcleod
- Alternate: Cole Parsons

Curling career
- Member Association: Alberta (1997–2024); Northwest Territories (2025–present)
- Brier: 1 (2026)
Medal record
Men's curling
Representing Canada
World Junior Championships
| Gold medal – first place | 2006 Jeonju |

Roland Robinson (born June 11, 1985) is a Canadian curler from Yellowknife, Northwest Territories. He currently plays second for the Jamie Koe rink. He is a former World Junior curling champion.

== Career ==
=== Youth ===
Early in his junior career, Robinson played third on the Peace River-based Greg Webb rink. The team won the Alberta Boys Intermediate championship in 2001 (now called the Alberta U18 Boy's Championship). The next season, the team were one of the two Peace entries at the 2002 Alberta Junior Men's Curling Championship.

Later on in his junior career, he joined the Geoff Walker rink as their third. The team won the 2003 Optimist International Alberta Juvenile Curling Championships (U18 provincials). The team went on to win the bronze medal at the 2003 Optimist International Juvenile Curling Championships. At the time, Robinson was employed as an icemaker in Grimshaw.

Tom Sallows took over the rink for the 2003–04 season, with Walker moving to third, and Robinson moving to second. The team made it to the final of the Alberta juniors in 2004, losing to Chris Schille. The following season, Robinson was replaced on the team by Charley Thomas, with Robinson forming his own rink. Representing Dawson Creek, British Columbia, Robinson led his team to a win-less 0–7 record at the 2005 Alberta juniors.

For the 2005–06 season, Robinson joined up with his old rink at second, now with Thomas skipping the team. The team won the 2006 Alberta juniors, defeating J. D. Lind in the final. The team then went on to represent Alberta at the 2006 Canadian Junior Curling Championships, where they defeated British Columbia's Ty Griffith in the final, 7–2. Robinson curled 91 per cent in game. Following the event, he was named as the event's first team all-star second. As national champions, the team then went on to represent Canada at the 2006 World Junior Curling Championships. There, the team won the gold medal, defeating Sweden (skipped by Nils Carlsén) in the final, 7–3. It was Robinson's last year of junior eligibility.

=== Men's ===
After juniors, Robinson moved to Sherwood Park, Alberta to work at a refinery. As he moved to the community too late in the 2006–07 season, he only spared in the local men's league. Eventually, he found himself playing lead for James Pahl. He played for Pahl at the 2008 Boston Pizza Cup, Alberta's men's provincial championship, making it to the 3 vs. 4 game, where they lost to Kevin Koe. The next season, Robinson threw second stones for the team. The team's new lead Warren Letendre had to miss playdowns due to his wife expecting to give berth. Robinson persuaded the team to add two-time World Champion and Olympic silver medallist Don Bartlett to the rink to replace Letendre. The rink played in the 2009 Boston Pizza Cup, where they lost in the semifinal to Randy Ferbey. The team qualified again for the 2010 Boston Pizza Cup with Robinson and Bartlett switching positions. The team were knocked out of the event before making the playoffs.

Robinson skipped his own team, and played for Rick McKague and Steve Petryk for the next couple of seasons, including winning the 2012 Original 16 WCT Bonspiel with Petryk. Robinson joined back with Pahl in 2013, initially throwing second rocks, but moving to lead when Ted Appelman was added to the team in 2014. The Pahl rink qualified for the 2015 Boston Pizza Cup, but once again missed the playoffs.

In 2015, Robinson began skipping his own team again. He and his rink of Jeff Erickson, Ryan Knowalyk and James Knievel qualified for the 2017 Boston Pizza Cup, Robinson's first provincial as a skip. The team was eliminated after three straight losses.

For the 2017–18 season, Robinson joined the Mike Hutchings rink as his third. They played in the 2018 Boston Pizza Cup. The team were knocked out after losing all three games. The next season, he joined up with Pahl again, throwing second on the team. The Pahl rink suffered the same fate at the 2019 Boston Pizza Cup as Robinson's previous two trips, losing all three games.

The 2019–20 curling season was more successful for the Pahl rink. The team won the 2019 Red Deer Curling Classic, and went 3–2 at the 2020 Boston Pizza Cup, just missing the playoffs. After the season, Robinson played one year with Glen Kennedy, skipped a team for one season, and then joined the Daylan Vavrek rink as his third for 2022–23. With Vavrek, the team won the 2022 Alberta Curling Series: Event 3, and played in the 2023 Boston Pizza Cup where they won four games before being eliminated. The next season, the Vavrek rink won the 2023 Alberta Curling Series Event 2 At the 2024 Boston Pizza Cup, the team again won four games before being knocked out.

Robinson moved to Yellowknife, Northwest Territories, and joined the Jamie Koe rink for the 2025–26 curling season as Koe's second. The team won the 2026 Northwest Territories Men's Curling Championship, and represented the Northwest Territories at the 2026 Montana's Brier, Robinson's first trip to the Canadian men's championship. There, the team finished with a 2–5 record.

=== Mixed doubles ===
Robinson has also competed in mixed doubles curling. He and partner Heather Nedohin won the 2019 STP Mixed Doubles event, and won the WFG Okotoks Mixed Doubles event with Bobbie Sauder.

== Personal life ==
As of 2026, Robinson was retired. He previously worked as a power engineer / process operator for Shell Canada.
