= Karsten Sturmay =

Canadian curler

- Curler
- Born: November 7, 1996 (age 30)

Team
- Curling club: Border Ice Rink, Kelso, SCO
- Skip: Cameron Bryce
- Third: Karsten Sturmay
- Second: Kerr Drummond
- Lead: Scott Hyslop
- Alternate: Robin McCall

Curling career
- Member Association: Alberta (2015–2023)
- Brier: 1 (2023)
Medal record
Curling
Representing Canada
Winter Universiade
Silver medal – second place	2019 Krasnoyarsk

Karsten Sturmay (born November 7, 1996, in Edmonton, Alberta) is a Canadian curler originally from Leduc, Alberta. He is formerly the skip of the Alberta Golden Bears men's curling team in university curling and on the World Curling Tour. He currently plays third on Team Cameron Bryce from Scotland.

== Curling career ==
As a junior curler, Sturmay won three provincial junior championships, in 2015, 2016 and 2018. At the 2015 Canadian Junior Curling Championships, Sturmay led his Alberta rink of Tristan Steinke, Brett Winfield and Mac Lenton to a 7–3 record before losing to Quebec in a tie-breaker match, missing the playoffs. At the 2016 Canadian Junior Curling Championships, he led his team of Steinke, Christopher Kennedy and Caleb Boorse to a 6–4 record, missing the playoffs. Also that season, Sturmay played third for the University of Alberta at the 2016 CIS/CCA Curling Championships. The team, skipped by Thomas Scoffin lost in the final to Laurier's Aaron Squires team. The team would make it to the final again at the 2017 U Sports/Curling Canada University Championship, but lost to Memorial's Adam Boland.

Sturmay and his team of Kennedy, Glenn Venance and Boorse represented Alberta at the 2018 Canadian Junior Curling Championships. There, he skipped the team to a 7–3 record, but lost in a tiebreaker against British Columbia. Sturmay played in his first provincial championship in 2018. He led his team all the way to the final, where they lost to Brendan Bottcher's rink. Later in the year he skipped his University of Alberta team to a U Sports/Curling Canada University Championship. Immediately after that, he and sister Selena Sturmay would play in the 2018 Canadian Mixed Doubles Curling Championship. Both events were played in his hometown of Leduc. The pair won the provincial mixed doubles title that year. At the mixed doubles championship, the pair finished with a 3–4 record. Sturmay ended the season by playing in his first Grand Slam event, playing third as a spare for the Kurt Balderston rink at the 2018 Humpty's Champions Cup. The team would go 0-4.

Sturmay has been playing on the World Curling Tour since 2013. He won his first event in 2016 when he won the inaugural Hokkaido Bank Curling Classic with teammates Tristan Steinke, Kennedy and Bourse. He won his second tour event at the 2018 Avonair Cash Spiel with Steinke, Jason Ginter and Venance.

Sturmay played in his second provincial championship in 2019. After losing his first two games, he qualified for the playoffs by winning all of his games on the C side of the draw. In the playoffs, he lost to Kevin Koe's rink in the 3 vs. 4 game, and was eliminated. Later in the year, Sturmay represented Canada at the 2019 Winter Universiade with Steinke, Kennedy and Venance by virtue of winning the national championships the previous season. After posting a 6-3 round robin record, his team defeated Switzerland in the semifinal, before losing to Norway in the final, to settle for a silver medal.

In the 2019–20 curling season, Sturmay won one event on the Tour, the 2019 Medicine Hat Charity Classic with Steinke, Ginter and Venance. At the 2020 Boston Pizza Cup provincial championship, he led his team (with Kennedy replacing Ginter) to a 4–1 record in group play, winning his group. In the playoffs, he won the A1 vs B1 game against Ted Appelman, sending his rink to the final, where he lost to Brendan Bottcher.

Most curling events were cancelled in the 2020–21 curling season, but Sturmay and his rink were back for the 2021–22 curling season. The team played in the 2021 Canadian Olympic Curling Pre-Trials, finishing 2–4 in pool play. They played in the 2022 Boston Pizza Cup after it had been cancelled the previous season. The team made the playoffs after winning the C1 event, but lost to Appelman in the C1 vs C2 game. Later in the season, he won the 2022 Alberta Curling Tour Championship which qualified him for the 2022 Champions Cup, where they failed to qualify for the playoffs.

In 2022, Sturmay added J. D. Lind, Kyle Doering and Kurtis Goller to his team, replacing Steinke and Kennedy. Team Sturmay began the 2022–23 curling season at the 2022 PointsBet Invitational, where they were eliminated after losing their first game against Colton Flasch. The team played in the 2023 Boston Pizza Cup, the Alberta men's provincial championship. There, the made it to the playoffs, losing to Aaron Sluchinski in the C1 vs. C2 page playoff game. The team still qualified for the 2023 Tim Hortons Brier as the third Wild Card entry, after earning enough points on tour, by winning events like the Ed Werenich Golden Wrench Classic and the McKee Homes Fall Curling Classic.

== Personal life ==
Sturmay is married.

== Grand Slam record ==
Key
C	Champion
F	Lost in Final
SF	Lost in Semifinal
QF	Lost in Quarterfinals
R16	Lost in the round of 16
Q	Did not advance to playoffs
T2	Played in Tier 2 event
DNP	Did not participate in event
N/A	Not a Grand Slam event that season

Event	2017–18	2018–19	2019–20	2020–21	2021–22	2022–23	2023–24
Tour Challenge	DNP	DNP	DNP	N/A	N/A	T2	T2
Champions Cup	Q	DNP	N/A	DNP	Q	DNP	N/A
