= Original 16 Tour Bonspiel =

- Established: 2012
- Host city: Calgary, Alberta
- Arena: Calgary Curling Club
- Purse: $24,000
- 2026 champion: (Saskatchewan) Mike McEwen

Location in Canada

The Original 16 Tour Bonspiel is an annual bonspiel, or curling tournament, that takes place at the Calgary Curling Club in Calgary, Alberta. The tournament is held in a round robin format. It was also a World Curling Tour event from 2012 to 2019.

== Past champions ==
Only skip's name is displayed.

Year	Winning skip	Runner up skip	Purse (CAD)
2012	(Alberta) Steve Petryk	(Alberta) Robert Schlender	$22,000
2013	(South Korea) Kim Chang-min	(Alberta) Thomas Scoffin	$24,800
2014	(Alberta) Brock Virtue	(Alberta) Robert Schlender	$21,000
2015	(Alberta) Charley Thomas	(Alberta) Thomas Scoffin	$15,200
2016	(Saskatchewan) Carl deConinck Smith	(Norway) Steffen Walstad	$15,000
2017	(Alberta) Kurt Balderston	(Scotland) Tom Brewster	$24,000
2018	(Alberta) Ted Appelman	(Alberta) James Pahl	$25,000
2019	(Alberta) Jeremy Harty	(Alberta) Daylan Vavrek	$25,000
2020	Cancelled		
2021	(British Columbia) Tyler Tardi	(Alberta) Jeremy Harty	$19,500
2022	(Scotland) Ross Whyte	(Alberta) Aaron Sluchinski	$24,000
2023	(Saskatchewan) Mike McEwen	(United States) Scott Dunnam	$24,000
2024	(Saskatchewan) Dustin Kalthoff	(United States) Ethan Sampson	$30,000
2025	(Alberta) Johnson Tao	(Yukon) Thomas Scoffin	$24,000
2026	(Saskatchewan) Mike McEwen	(British Columbia) Mitchell Kopytko	
