= Curling Alberta =

Albertan regional body for the sports curling

- Sport: Curling
- Jurisdiction: Provincial
- Founded: 2018
- Affiliation: Curling Canada
- Headquarters: Edmonton

Official website
- www.curlingalberta.ca
- (Canada)

Curling Alberta is the regional governing body for the sport of curling in Alberta. It was incorporated in 2018 as an amalgamate of the Alberta Curling Federation (ACF), the Northern Alberta Curling Association (NACA), the Southern Alberta Curling Association (SACA), and the Peace Curling Association (PCA). Curling clubs in the Northern Rockies Regional Municipality and Peace River Regional District of British Columbia are also members of Curling Alberta (and previously the PCA), as opposed to Curl BC.

== Provincial championships ==
Curling Alberta hosts ten provincial championships annually:

- Juniors
- Alberta Scotties Tournament of Hearts (Women's)
- Boston Pizza Cup (Men's)
- Mixed Doubles
- Seniors
- Masters
- U18
- Wheelchair
- Mixed
- Club

== See also ==
- List of curling clubs in Alberta
