= Brendan Bottcher =

Canadian curler (born 1991)

- Curler
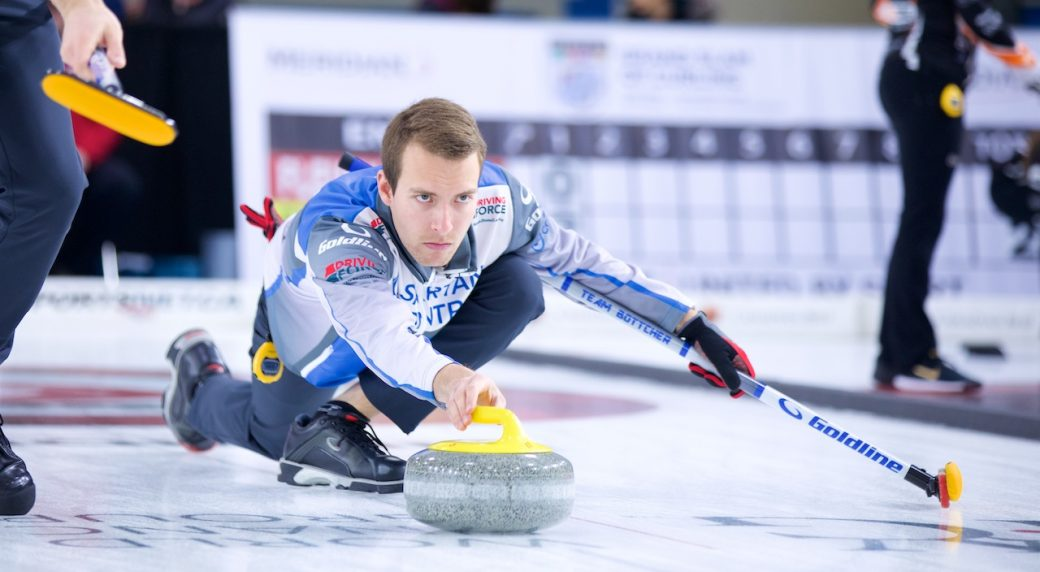
- Bottcher at the 2019 Humpty's Champions Cup
- Born: Brendan Michael Bottcher; December 19, 1991 (age 34); Sherwood Park, Alberta, Canada

Team
- Curling club: Saville Community SC, Edmonton, AB
- Skip: Brendan Bottcher
- Third: Jacob Horgan
- Second: Tanner Horgan
- Lead: Geoff Walker
- Mixed doubles partner: Rachel Homan

Curling career
- Member Association: Alberta (2007–2024; 2026–present) Newfoundland and Labrador (2024–2026)
- Brier: 10 (2017, 2018, 2019, 2020, 2021, 2022, 2023, 2024, 2025, 2026)
- World Championship: 1 (2021)
- Pan Continental Championship: 1 (2024)
- Top CTRS ranking: 1st (2018–19)
- Grand Slam victories: 5 (2019 Canadian Open, 2019 Players', 2019 Champions Cup, 2023 Canadian Open, 2023 Champions Cup)
Medal record
Men's curling
Representing Canada
World Junior Curling Championships
Gold medal – first place	2012 Östersund
Winter Universiade
Bronze medal – third place	2013 Trentino
The Brier
Bronze medal – third place	2022 Lethbridge
Bronze medal – third place	2025 Kelowna
Representing Alberta
Canadian Mixed Doubles Olympic Trials
Silver medal – second place	2025 Liverpool
The Brier
Gold medal – first place	2021 Calgary
Silver medal – second place	2018 Regina
Silver medal – second place	2020 Kingston
Bronze medal – third place	2024 Regina
Canadian Mixed Doubles Championship
Bronze medal – third place	2026 Surrey
Representing (Alberta) Team Wild Card
The Brier
Silver medal – second place	2019 Brandon
Bronze medal – third place	2023 London

Brendan Michael Bottcher (born December 19, 1991) is a Canadian curler from Spruce Grove, Alberta. Bottcher is a three-time Alberta provincial men's champion, and was the skip of the 2021 Canadian men's championship team, having led Alberta to victory at the 2021 Tim Hortons Brier.

Born in Sherwood Park, Alberta, Bottcher enjoyed a successful junior career winning the 2012 Canadian Junior Curling Championships and the 2012 World Junior Curling Championships. He was also the 2010 Alberta junior men's champion and the 2007 Alberta juvenile provincial finalist. He currently skips his own team out of Edmonton.

== Career ==
=== Junior career ===
In the 2009–2010 season, with Brad Thiessen at third, Landon Bucholz at second, Bryce Bucholz at lead, and Bernie Panich as their coach, they had much success winning four junior bonspiels and being a runner-up in another. In the Edmonton Men's Super-League, they posted a .500 record. In a few exhibition games throughout the season prior to the 2010 Winter Olympics, they played Olympic calibre teams such as Kevin Martin and Thomas Ulsrud. The team would then go on to win the Alberta junior provincial curling championships, beating their cross town rival Curtis Bale 6–4 in the final. This provincial junior title earned him a berth to the 2010 Canadian Junior Curling Championships in Sorel-Tracy, Quebec. At Canadian Junior Curling Championships, the team had mixed success, finishing with a 6–6 record.

Although contenders to return the following Canadian junior curling championships, the team lost the 2011 Alberta junior provincial semi-final to Scott Smith of Calgary. The end of the 2010–2011 season saw Brad Thiessen age out of junior eligibility. The team then added long time Alberta junior competitor Evan Asmussen to the lineup prior to the 2011–2012 season. After his junior curling season concluded, Bottcher skipped his University of Alberta Golden Bears men's team to a semi-final finish at the CIS curling championships.

The 2011–2012 season saw Bottcher continue his previous success at the 2012 Alberta junior provincials, finishing the round robin with a perfect record and defeating Jordan Steinke of Dawson Creek in the final to win his second provincial junior title. At the 2012 Canadian Junior Curling Championships in Napanee, Ontario the team finished the round robin with an 11–1 record, earning a bye to the Canadian final. Bottcher himself would earn first team all-star skip honours for the highest shooting percentage in the round robin. Bottcher would then defeated Wark of Northern Ontario 9-6 to win the Canadian junior championships. The team would then proceed to the 2012 World Junior Curling Championships in Östersund Sweden, where he finished the round robin with an 8–1 record, only losing to Scotland's Kyle Smith 8–4. A 1-2 page play-off 9–3 victory over Sweden gave Bottcher and his team a direct berth to the final. Sweden would defeat Norway 8–4 in the semi-final game, setting up a re-match in the final. Bottcher would score five points in the seventh end of the final for a 10–4 win and become the 2012 World Junior men's curling champion - the first world junior men's curling championship title for Canada since 2007.

Prior to the World Junior Curling Championships and after the Canadian Junior Curling Championships, Bottcher's University of Alberta Golden Bears team went undefeated at the Canada West Curling Championships, qualifying them for the Canadian Interuniversity Sport (CIS) Curling Championships. Days after the world juniors, Bottcher returned to Canada to compete at the CIS nationals and led the Golden Bears to the university's first ever curling national championship. Bottcher and his university team of third Mick Lizmore, second Brad Thiessen, lead Karrick Martin and alternate Parker Konschuh had a strong weekend, only losing one game to the UPEI Panthers' Brett Gallant 10–4. The team's strong performance was demonstrated when the front end was awarded 1st team All-Canadian honours while the back end received 2nd team All-Canadian honours. The championship was Bottcher's third in five weeks. A chemical engineering student, he was named Athlete of the Year and Academic All-Canadian of the Year from the University of Alberta.

Bottcher's rink represented Canada at the 2013 Winter Universiade, where he was named Canada's flag bearer for the opening ceremony. Team Canada won the bronze medal at the event.

=== 2012–2022 ===
Now aged out of junior, Bottcher continued to curl with his University of Alberta team consisting of Lizmore, Thiessen and Martin. They won their first World Curling Tour event at the 2012 Red Deer Curling Classic, defeating the Kevin Koe rink in the final. The team played in their first men's provincials at the 2013 Boston Pizza Cup, winning just one game before being eliminated. The following season, the team qualified for two Grand Slam of Curling events, the 2013 Canadian Open and the 2014 National. At both events, the team posted a 1–4 record, not reaching the playoffs. They did, however, win their second World Curling Tour event, the 2013 Spruce Grove Cashspiel. At the 2014 Boston Pizza Cup they again won just one game before being eliminated.

Following the 2013–14 season, Lizmore left the team to form his own rink, and was replaced by Albertan veteran curler Tom Appelman. The team found immediate success with their new addition, beginning the 2014–15 season by winning the 2014 HDF Insurance Shoot-Out. That season, the team also won the German Masters and lost the final of the Red Deer Curling Classic. They also played in three Grand Slams, the 2014 National, the 2014 Canadian Open and the 2015 Players' Championship, making it to the semifinals in all three events. At the 2015 Boston Pizza Cup, the team would make it all the way to the final, where they lost to the Kevin Koe rink. The following season, the team had less success on tour, not winning any tour events. They did, however, reach the finals at both the HDF Insurance Shoot-Out and the Direct Horizontal Drilling Fall Classic. In Grand Slam play, they competed in five events, only reaching the quarterfinals of the 2015 Tour Challenge and the 2015 Canadian Open. At the 2016 Boston Pizza Cup, they would lose in the semifinal to the Koe rink.

Following the 2015–16 season, Appelman left the team and was replaced by two-time Brier champion Pat Simmons for the 2016–17 season. The team had mixed results on tour, reaching the semifinals at three events but never advancing to the finals. In Grand Slam play, they competed in the 2016 WFG Masters, the 2016 Tour Challenge and the 2016 Boost National, never reaching the playoffs in any of the three events. Over the 2016 Christmas break Simmons left the rink, with Darren Moulding taking over at third. With Moulding on the team they made it to the quarterfinals at the 2017 Canadian Open, which was the first event for the new lineup. In February 2017 Bottcher, Moulding, Brad Thiessen and Karrick Martin won the 2017 Boston Pizza Cup. After a 3–0 record through the preliminary round, they won both the 1 vs. 2 page playoff game and the championship final, defeating the Ted Appelman rink 6–5 in the final game. The win earned Team Bottcher the right to represent Alberta at the 2017 Tim Hortons Brier, Bottcher's first appearance at the Canadian national men's championship. There, he led his province to a 3–8 round robin record, however, was able to defeat the defending champions Team Koe in one of those victories. They went 1–4 in their final event of the season, the 2017 Players' Championship.

During the 2017–18 season, the Bottcher rink won two tour events, the Medicine Hat Charity Classic and the Red Deer Curling Classic. They also reached the semifinals of the 2017 GSOC Tour Challenge Tier 2, losing their semifinal game to William Lyburn. In November 2017, the team competed in the Canadian Olympic Curling Pre-Trials in attempts to qualify for the 2017 Canadian Olympic Curling Trials. After a slow start, they managed to qualify for the playoffs with a 3–3 record. They then beat Glenn Howard in one of the semifinal games before losing to the John Morris rink in the first qualification final. They were, however, able to again defeat Howard in the second final, earning the ninth and final spot at the Olympic Trials. At the Trials, held December 2 to 10 in Ottawa, Ontario, the team posted a 4–4 round robin record, finishing in fourth place and just out of the playoffs. In the new year, they reached the quarterfinals of the 2018 Canadian Open where they lost to the eventual champions Team Peter de Cruz. Bottcher himself did not compete with the team, however, and was replaced by Steve Laycock. Team Bottcher posted a perfect 5–0 record en route to defend their title at the 2018 Boston Pizza Cup, earning the right to represent Alberta at the 2018 Tim Hortons Brier. There, Bottcher led his team to a 8–3 record, earning a spot in the 3 vs. 4 page playoff game. They beat Northern Ontario's Brad Jacobs in the 3 vs. 4 game and then defeated Ontario's John Epping in the semifinal to reach the Brier final. In the championship game, against Team Canada's Brad Gushue, the team settled for silver after a 6–4 defeat. They ended their season at the 2018 Players' Championship and the 2018 Humpty's Champions Cup Slams. After missing the playoffs at the Players', they made the quarterfinals at the Champions Cup.

Team Bottcher had a strong start to the 2018–19 season, winning their second event, the Canad Inns Men's Classic, by defeating Team Kevin Koe in the final. They later played in the 2018 Tour Challenge where they made it all the way to the final where they were defeated by the Brad Jacobs rink. They also made the final of the Red Deer Curling Classic and reached the tiebreaker stage of the 2018 Canada Cup where they were beaten by the Koe rink. In January 2019, Team Bottcher would win their first Grand Slam event at the 2019 Canadian Open, capping off an undefeated week by defeating Team John Epping 6–3 in the final. They then competed in and won the 2019 TSN All-Star Curling Skins Game, earning $54,500 for their win. Despite losing the semifinal of the 2019 Boston Pizza Cup, Team Bottcher still competed in the 2019 Tim Hortons Brier as the Wildcard entry after beating the Epping rink in the wildcard game. After an 8–3 record through the round robin and championship pools, they qualified for the playoffs for the second straight year. They then secured wins over Canada's Brad Gushue and Northern Ontario's Brad Jacobs in the 3 vs. 4 page playoff and semifinal games respectively, qualifying for their second straight Brier final where they faced the Koe rink in the final. After a close game all the way through, Team Koe would score two in the tenth end to win the game 4–3, handing Team Bottcher another silver medal. They ended their season at the 2019 Players' Championship and 2019 Champions Cup Grand Slam events. At the Players', they went 3–2 through the round robin before winning all three of their playoff games to win the title. They also found success at the Champions Cup, going an undefeated 7–0 to claim their third straight Slam title.

Team Bottcher began their 2019–20 season at the 2019 AMJ Campbell Shorty Jenkins Classic where they lost the tiebreaker to Yannick Schwaller. They then played in the first two Slams of the season, reaching the quarterfinals of the 2019 Masters and the semifinals of the 2019 Tour Challenge. Team Bottcher won their first event of the season at the Ashley HomeStore Curling Classic, defeating the Mike McEwen rink in the final. They then lost in the semifinal of the 2019 Canada Cup to eventual winners Team John Epping. At the next two Slams, the team made the quarterfinals of the 2019 National and missed the playoffs at the 2020 Canadian Open. After losing the semifinal to Kevin Koe at provincials the previous season, Team Bottcher would win the 2020 Boston Pizza Cup with a draw to the button to defeat Karsten Sturmay 7–6. At the 2020 Tim Hortons Brier, the team went undefeated through the round robin with a 7–0 record. They then went 3–1 in the championship pool, and then beat Saskatchewan's Matt Dunstone in the 1 vs. 2 page playoff game. For the third year in a row, they would finish runner-up at the Brier, losing to Newfoundland and Labrador's Brad Gushue 7–3 in the championship final. It would be the team's last event of the season as both the Players' Championship and the Champions Cup Grand Slam events were cancelled due to the COVID-19 pandemic.

Team Bottcher played in three tour events during the 2020–21 season, winning the ATB Okotoks Classic and reaching the semifinals at both the ATB Banff Classic and the Ashley HomeStore Curling Classic. Due to the COVID-19 pandemic in Alberta, the 2021 provincial championship was cancelled. As the reigning provincial champions, Team Bottcher was chosen to represent Alberta at the 2021 Tim Hortons Brier, which was played behind closed doors in a "bubble" in Calgary. At the 2020 Brier, they finished second in their pool during round-robin play, with a 6–2 record. In the championship pool they improved their record to 9–3, earning the third seed in the playoffs where they defeated Matt Dunstone's Team Saskatchewan in the semifinals to make it to their fourth Brier finals in a row. Team Bottcher defeated four-time Brier champion Kevin Koe in the finals, with a score of 4–2, to win their first Brier championship. With the Brier win, Team Bottcher earned the right to represent Canada at the 2021 World Men's Curling Championship, which was also played in the Calgary bubble. Bottcher led Canada to a 9–4 round robin record, in fourth place. This put them into the playoffs in a game against Scotland, skipped by Bruce Mouat, which they lost, eliminating the team. The team wrapped up the season in the bubble by playing in the season's only two slams. They lost to Mouat again in the final of the 2022 Champions Cup and missed the playoffs in the 2022 Players' Championship.

The next season, the team's first major tournament was the 2021 Masters, where they the lost to Mouat in the semifinals. The following week, the team represented Canada at the 2021 Americas Challenge, easily beating Brazil and Mexico to qualify Canada for a spot at the 2022 World Men's Curling Championship. The following week, they played in the 2021 National being eliminated once again by Team Mouat, this time in the quarterfinals. The team wrapped up the month of November at the 2021 Canadian Olympic Curling Trials, held November 20 to 28 in Saskatoon, Saskatchewan. There, they posted a disappointing 3–5 record. Following the Trials, Darren Moulding was cut from the team. His cut caused controversy, as the team stated on social media that he was leaving the team for "personal reasons", in which Moulding replied was "complete BS". Moulding stated that a rift with his teammates began the previous season while in the Calgary curling bubble, when he "challenged Bottcher on issues that he felt were important (to the team)". This included a "better business structure", suggesting that he wanted an equal share of the team's winnings. Moulding was replaced by the team's alternate, Patrick Janssen. The team represented Team Canada at the 2022 Tim Hortons Brier as defending champions. They finished the round robin with a 7–1 record, and qualified for the 1 vs. 2 game. They lost this game against Alberta's Kevin Koe rink, and were eliminated after losing the semifinal against Wild Card #1, which was skipped by Brad Gushue. The team then wrapped up the season by making it to the semifinals of the 2022 Players' Championship (being eliminated again by Bruce Mouat), and then lost in the quarters of the 2022 Champions Cup to Brad Gushue.

In April 2022, it was announced that his team was going to be going their separate ways, with Bottcher forming a new team with Marc Kennedy, Brett Gallant and Ben Hebert, all former Olympians.

=== 2022–2024 ===
Bottcher's new look foursome began their first season together by winning the 2022 ATB Okotoks Classic. A week later, they played in the inaugural PointsBet Invitational, making it to the semifinals before losing to Matt Dunstone. A few weeks later, the team played in their first Slam together at the 2022 National. After going 3–1 in pool play, they lost in the quarterfinals to Korey Dropkin. Then, they played in the 2022 Tour Challenge where they lost all of their games. They rebounded at the 2022 Masters winning all four of their pool games, and then made it as far as the semifinals where they lost to Joël Retornaz of Italy in a low scoring 3–1 affair. The team began the 2023 calendar year at the 2023 Canadian Open where they won all of their games to win their first Grand Slam title as a foursome. The following month, they played in the 2023 Boston Pizza Cup provincial championship. There, they won all of their games until the final, where they lost to their provincial rivals Kevin Koe who had inherited Bottcher's former front end of Martin and Thiessen. Due to their performance on the tour that season, they still qualified for the 2023 Tim Hortons Brier as the Wild Card #1 entry. At the Brier, Bottcher led the team to a 7–1 record in pool play. The team then made it into the 3 vs. 4 page playoff game after losing to Manitoba (Matt Dunstone) in the qualification final. In the 3 vs. 4 game, they beat Ontario (Mike McEwen), but then lost in the semifinal when they faced off against Dunstone again, settling for third place. At the final two slams of the year, the team missed the playoffs at the 2023 Players' Championship after going 2–3, but rebounded to go undefeated at the 2023 Champions Cup to win Bottcher's fifth career Slam title.

=== 2024-present ===
On April 16, 2024, Bottcher's teammates made an announcement that they would be "going in a new direction" at skip, resulting in Bottcher's departure after two seasons. In the off season, it was announced that he had paired up with Rachel Homan to play mixed doubles and that he would be coaching her women's team. On October 15, it was announced that he would be joining Brad Gushue's rink as his second following the departure of E. J. Harnden, and that he would be stepping back from his coaching duties of Team Homan.

== Coaching ==
Bottcher coached the Spanish Mixed Doubles Team of Irantzu García and Gontzal García at the 2017 World Mixed Doubles Curling Championship. The pair qualified for the playoffs with a 4–2 record and ultimately finished in thirteenth place.

== Personal life ==
Bottcher works as technical sales specialist for Spartan Controls Ltd. after studying chemical engineering at the University of Alberta. He is married to Bobbie Sauder and they have four children.

== Year-by-year statistics ==
=== Team events ===
Year	Team	Position	Event	Finish	Record	Pct. (Note: Round robin only)
2008	Bottcher	Skip	Alberta Juniors	T6th	1–6	–
2009	Bottcher	Skip	Alberta Juniors	T5th	3–4	–
2010	Bottcher (SSC)	Skip	Alberta Juniors	1st	7–2	–
2010	Alberta (Bottcher)	Skip	Canadian Juniors	6th	6–6	72
2011	Bottcher	Skip	Alberta Juniors	3rd	5–4	–
2011	University of Alberta (Bottcher)	Skip	CIS	3rd	5–3	–
2012	Bottcher (SSC)	Skip	Alberta Juniors	1st		–
2012	Alberta (Bottcher)	Skip	Canadian Juniors	1st	12–1	84
2012	Canada (Bottcher)	Skip	World Juniors	1st	10–1	–
2012	University of Alberta (Bottcher)	Skip	CIS	1st	7–1	–
2013	Bottcher (SSC)	Skip	Alberta Provincials	DNQ	1–3	–
2013	University of Alberta (Bottcher)	Skip	CIS	2nd	6–2	–
2013	Canada (Bottcher)	Skip	Winter Universiade	3rd	8–3	–
2014	Bottcher (SSC)	Skip	Alberta Provincials	DNQ	1–3	–
2014	University of Alberta (Bottcher)	Skip	CIS	2nd	5–4	–
2015	Bottcher (SSC)	Skip	Alberta Provincials	2nd	5–3	–
2016	Bottcher (SSC)	Skip	Alberta Provincials	3rd	5–3	–
2017	Bottcher (SSC)	Skip	Alberta Provincials	1st	5–0	–
2017	Alberta (Bottcher)	Skip	2017 Brier	10th	3–8	81
2017	Bottcher	Skip	COCT – Pre	2nd	5–4	81
2017	Bottcher	Skip	2017 COCT	4th	4–4	81
2018	Bottcher (SSC)	Skip	Alberta Provincials	1st	5–0	–
2018	Alberta (Bottcher)	Skip	2018 Brier	2nd	10–4	84
2018	Bottcher (SSC)	Skip	Canada Cup	4th	4–3	82
2019	Bottcher (SSC)	Skip	Alberta Provincials	3rd	4–3	–
2019	Bottcher (SSC)	Skip	Brier Wildcard	1st	1–0	85
2019	Wild Card (Bottcher)	Skip	2019 Brier	2nd	10–4	81
2019	Bottcher (SSC)	Skip	Canada Cup	3rd	5–2	80
2020	Canada	Skip	Cont'l Cup	2nd	0–4	78
2020	Bottcher (SSC)	Skip	Alberta Provincials	1st	7–1	–
2020	Alberta (Bottcher)	Skip	2020 Brier	2nd	11–2	88
2021	Alberta (Bottcher)	Skip	2021 Brier	1st	11–3	85
2021	Canada (Bottcher)	Skip	2021 WMCC	T5th	9–5	85
2021	Canada (Bottcher)	Skip	Americas Challenge	1st	4–0	
2021	Bottcher	Skip	2021 COCT	7th	3–5	84
Brier Totals					45–21	84%
Olympic Curling Trial Totals					4–4	83
World Championships Totals					9–5	85%

=== Mixed doubles ===
Year	Partner	Event	Finish	Record	Pct.
2017	Dana Ferguson	CMDCC	T5th	7–2	–
2018	Dana Ferguson	CMDCOT	T7th	6–4	81
2019	Bobbie Sauder	CMDCC	T5th	6–3	81
2020	Dana Ferguson	Cont'l Cup	2nd	1–0	86
2021	Bobbie Sauder	CMDCC	30th	1–5	74
Olympic Curling Trial Totals				6–4	81

== Grand Slam record ==
Key
C	Champion
F	Lost in Final
SF	Lost in Semifinal
QF	Lost in Quarterfinals
R16	Lost in the round of 16
Q	Did not advance to playoffs
T2	Played in Tier 2 event
DNP	Did not participate in event
N/A	Not a Grand Slam event that season

Event	2013–14	2014–15	2015–16	2016–17	2017–18	2018–19	2019–20	2020–21	2021–22	2022–23	2023–24	2024–25	2025–26	2026–27
Invitational	N/A	N/A	QF	Q	T2	F	SF	N/A	N/A	Q	F	DNP	QF	QF
Masters	DNP	DNP	Q	Q	DNP	DNP	QF	N/A	SF	SF	SF	Q	Q	QF
National	Q	SF	Q	Q	DNP	DNP	QF	N/A	QF	QF	SF	QF	DNP	Q
Open	Q	SF	QF	QF	DNP	C	Q	N/A	N/A	C	F	F	QF	
Players'	DNP	SF	DNP	Q	Q	C	N/A	Q	SF	Q	Q	Q	DNP	
Champions Cup	N/A	N/A	DNP	DNP	QF	C	N/A	F	QF	C	N/A	N/A	N/A	N/A
Elite 10	N/A	DNP	Q	DNP	DNP	DNP	N/A	N/A	N/A	N/A	N/A	N/A	N/A	N/A

== Teams ==
Season	Skip	Third	Second	Lead
2009–10	Brendan Bottcher	Brad Thiessen	Landon Bucholz	Bryce Bucholz
2010–11	Brendan Bottcher	Brad Thiessen	Landon Bucholz	Bryce Bucholz
2011–12	Brendan Bottcher	Brad Thiessen; Evan Asmussen	Mick Lizmore	Karrick Martin
2012–13	Brendan Bottcher	Mick Lizmore	Brad Thiessen	Karrick Martin
2013–14	Brendan Bottcher	Mick Lizmore; Evan Asmussen	Brad Thiessen	Karrick Martin
2014–15	Brendan Bottcher	Tom Appelman	Brad Thiessen	Karrick Martin
2015–16	Brendan Bottcher	Tom Appelman	Brad Thiessen	Karrick Martin
2016–17	Brendan Bottcher	Pat Simmons; Darren Moulding	Brad Thiessen	Karrick Martin
2017–18	Brendan Bottcher	Darren Moulding	Brad Thiessen	Karrick Martin
2018–19	Brendan Bottcher	Darren Moulding	Brad Thiessen	Karrick Martin
2019–20	Brendan Bottcher	Darren Moulding	Brad Thiessen	Karrick Martin
2020–21	Brendan Bottcher	Darren Moulding	Brad Thiessen	Karrick Martin
2021–22	Brendan Bottcher	Darren Moulding; Pat Janssen	Brad Thiessen	Karrick Martin
2022–23	Brendan Bottcher	Marc Kennedy	Brett Gallant	Ben Hebert
2023–24	Brendan Bottcher	Marc Kennedy	Brett Gallant	Ben Hebert
2024–25	Brad Gushue	Mark Nichols	Brendan Bottcher	Geoff Walker
2025–26	Brad Gushue	Mark Nichols	Brendan Bottcher	Geoff Walker
2026–27	Brendan Bottcher	Jacob Horgan	Tanner Horgan	Geoff Walker
