= The Glencoe Club =

Sports venue and club in Alberta, Canada

- Type: Private sports club
- Region served: Calgary
- Website: glencoe.org

The Glencoe Club is a private sports and social club located in southwest Calgary, Alberta, Canada founded in 1931. Its facilities include two swimming pools, six badminton courts, ten bowling lanes, eight curling sheets, a skating rink, seven squash courts, six indoor tennis courts, and a fitness facility. The club is the main training centre for the Canadian Olympic Curling teams.

== Etymology ==
The area the club was founded on was called the Glencoe Subdivision. The subdivision was named after the Glencoe valley, in Scotland.

== History ==
The club was founded in 1931 when the Calgary Skating Club decided to handover all assets to the newly formed Glencoe. The official inauguration took place on March 21, 1931. The original directors of the club acquired the land on a 30-year lease from the city of Calgary for $70,000. The original building was contracted to J.A. Tweddle Ltd. and shares were subscribed to at $100 each. The building was constructed in just three months and when the Glencoe officially had its grand opening on November 16, 1931, opened it had 1,200 members, 450 of who had shares.

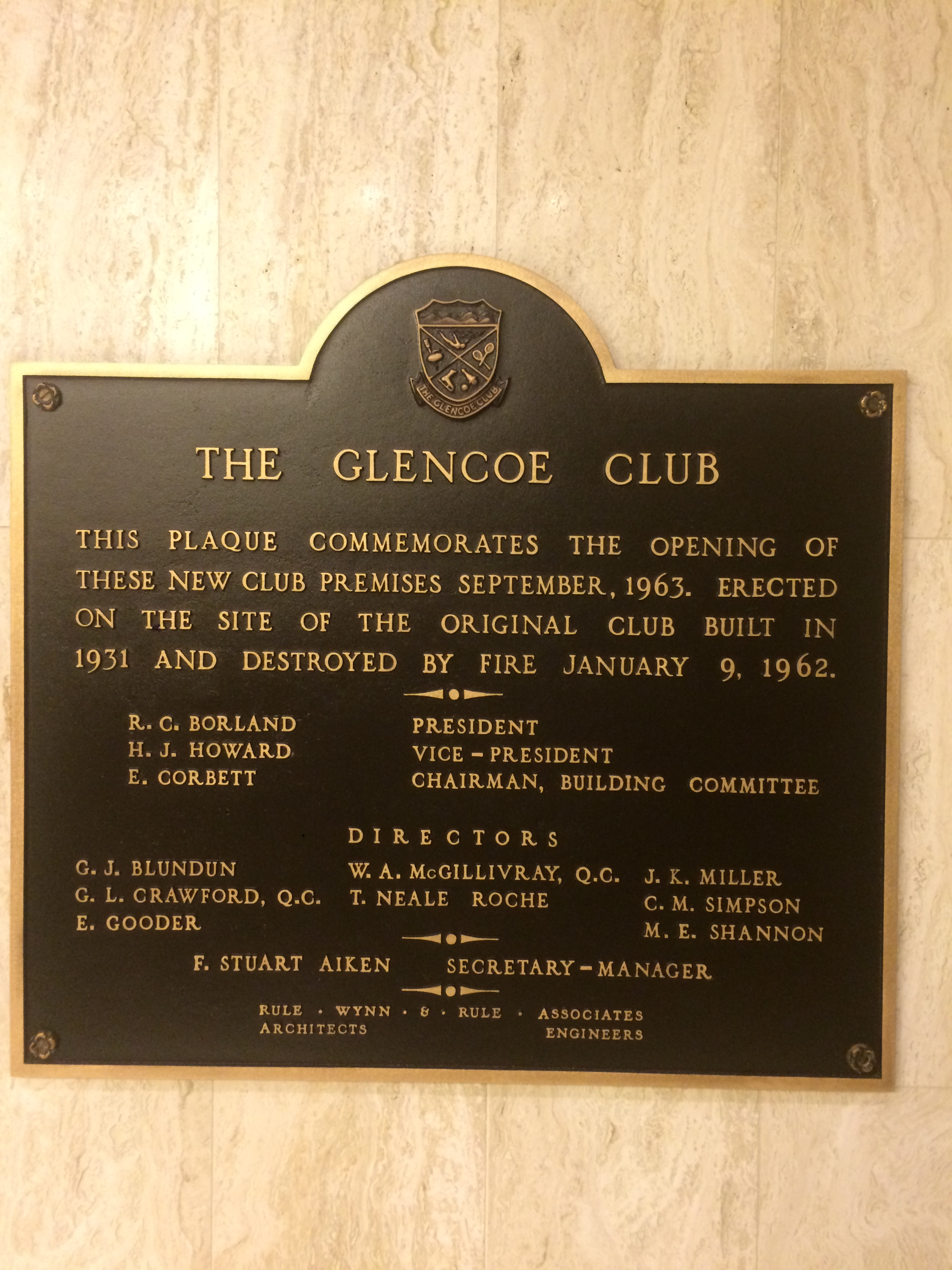
Plaque commemorating the founding of the club.

During the later part of the thirties and early forties the club was having financial trouble and was essentially bankrupt. However the club made it through these years and following the end of the second world war the board decided to install 'artificial ice' so that skating could be part of the Glencoe year round. When the ice plant opened in 1947 it was the first ice to be used for both curling and skating in Alberta. The Hon. C.E. Gerhart, the then Minister of Trade, Commerce, and Municipal Affairs opened the new plant. The new ice was then used to host the 1948 Canadian Figure Skating Championships. Following this was the 16th annual ice show and the guest star was Barbara Ann Scott along with Wallace Diestelmeyer and Suzanne Morrow. This was so successful that that year there was another ice show in November which featured Yvonne Claire Sherman and Jimmy Grogan.

In 1948, the Glencoe grew and improved a further $50,000 in improvements. By now the club hosted three skating rinks (two outdoor one indoors), six curling rinks, six badminton courts, four bowling alleys, squash courts, two table tennis sets, lawn bowling, six hard surface tennis courts, a lounge, and a dining rooms.

In 1953, the Glencoe added four more lanes for bowling, two sheets of curling ice as well as renovating the kitchen, lounge, and new offices for $150,000.

== Curling ==
=== Notable members ===
- Kevin Koe
- Amy Nixon
- Carter Rycroft
- Nolan Thiessen
- Chelsea Carey
- Laine Peters
- Jocelyn Peterman
- Brett Gallant
- Brent Laing
- Herbert Greenfield—4th Premier of Alberta
