= 2017 Manitoba Scotties Tournament of Hearts =

- Host city: Winnipeg, Manitoba
- Arena: Eric Coy Arena
- Dates: January 25–29
- Winner: Team Englot
- Curling club: Granite Curling Club, Winnipeg
- Skip: Michelle Englot
- Third: Kate Cameron
- Second: Leslie Wilson-Westcott
- Lead: Raunora Westcott
- Finalist: Darcy Robertson

The 2017 Manitoba Scotties Tournament of Hearts, the provincial women's curling championship of Manitoba, was held from January 25 to 29 at the Eric Coy Arena in Winnipeg. The winning Michelle Englot team represented Manitoba at the 2017 Scotties Tournament of Hearts in St. Catharines, Ontario, finishing second.

The event was most notable for the defeat of the defending Olympic champion Jennifer Jones rink in the semifinal. Jones lost to Darcy Robertson who proceeded to lose to the Michelle Englot rink in the final. Englot, who is a resident of Regina, Saskatchewan had won seven provincial titles in her home province, but joined her new Winnipeg-based team in the 2016 off season, replacing their previous skip Kristy McDonald who had lost in the final of the 2016 Manitoba Scotties Tournament of Hearts. It was the first provincial title for Englot's third, Kate Cameron, while second Leslie Wilson-Westcott and lead Raunora Westcott won their third provincial titles.

Jennifer Jones' loss in the semifinal would mark the first time since 2004 that she would not win a provincial tournament she had participated in. Jones cited a number of factors for her team's loss stating "the ice was tricky today ... draw shots were harder and it was a struggle with draw weight for everybody". Jones' semifinal loss was her second in a row, after having won all seven of her round robin games.

After the event, Jones was awarded as the tournament's all-star skip, Cameron was named all-star third, Vanessa Foster (Team Robertson) was named all-star second and Mariah Mondor (Team Birchard) was named all-star lead.

== Teams ==
The defending Olympic champion Jennifer Jones rink was the top seed ahead of the event. They had not played in the 2016 provincial Scotties, as they had an automatic berth to the 2016 Scotties Tournament of Hearts as Team Canada for having won the 2015 Scotties Tournament of Hearts. 2016 provincial champion Kerri Einarson was given the second seed, while eventual-winner Michelle Englot was given the third seed.

The teams are listed as follows:

Skip	Third	Second	Lead	Club(s)
Meghan Armit	Nikki Hawrylshen	Laura Budowski	Taryn Dreger	West Kildonan Curling Club, Winnipeg
Shannon Birchard	Nicole Sigvaldason	Sheyna Andries	Mariah Mondor	St. Vital Curling Club, Winnipeg
Jennifer Briscoe	Sheri Horning	Courtney Reeves	Lorelle Weiss	Burntwood CC, Thompson
Joelle Brown	Alyssa Calvert	Erika Sigurdson	Lindsay Baldock	Assiniboine Memorial Curling Club, Winnipeg
Kerri Einarson	Selena Kaatz	Liz Fyfe	Kristin MacCuish	East St. Paul Curling Club, East St. Paul
Michelle Englot	Kate Cameron	Leslie Wilson-Westcott	Raunora Westcott	Granite Curling Club, Winnipeg
Jennifer Jones	Kaitlyn Lawes	Jill Officer	Dawn McEwen	St. Vital Curling Club, Winnipeg
Colleen Kilgallen	Kim Link	Renee Fletcher	Karen Fallis	East St. Paul Curling Club, East St. Paul
Christine MacKay	Gaetanne Gauthier	Taylor Maida	Katrina Thiessen	Fort Rouge Curling Club, Winnipeg
Tiffany McLean	Mallory Black	Danielle Robinson	Cassandra Lesiuk	Portage CC, Portage la Prairie
Briane Meilleur	Rhonda Varnes	Janelle Vachon	Sarah Neufeld	Fort Rouge Curling Club, Winnipeg
Lisa Menard	Lisa DeRiviere	Lesle Cafferty	Laurie Macdonell	Dauphin Curling Club, Dauphin
Cathy Overton-Clapham	Jenna Loder	Katherine Doerksen	Sarah Pyke	Fort Rouge Curling Club, Winnipeg
Beth Peterson	Robyn Njegovan	Melissa Gordon	Breanne Yozenko	Assiniboine Memorial Curling Club, Winnipeg
Cheryl Reed	Tanya Enns	Pam Robins	Roz Taylor	Brandon Curling Club, Brandon
Darcy Robertson	Karen Klein	Vanessa Foster	Michelle Madden	Pembina CC, Winnipeg

== Round robin standings ==
Key
Teams to Playoffs
Teams to Tiebreaker

Asham Group	W	L
Jones	7	0
Birchard	4	3
Reed	4	3
Brown	3	4
Meilleur	3	4
Briscoe	3	4
MacKay	3	4
Killgallen	1	6

Express Group	W	L
Englot	5	2
Robertson	5	2
Einarson	5	2
Overton-Clapham	4	3
Peterson	4	3
Menard	3	4
Armit	1	6
Mclean	1	6

== Scores ==
Draw 1

- Brown 10-5 Briscoe
- Meilleur 7-4 MacKay
- Jones 9-3 Reed
- Birchard 9-2 Kilgallen

Draw 2

- Overton-Clapham 8-5 McLean
- Englot 9-8 Menard
- Einarson 5-3 Armit
- Peterson 7-6 Robertson

Draw 3

- Jones 8-5 MacKay
- Brown 9-4 Kilgallen
- Briscoe 7-3 Birchard
- Reed 8-6 Meilleur

Draw 4

- Menard 8-3 Einarson
- Peterson 9-6 Overton-Clapham
- Robertson 13-7 McLean
- Englot 11-4 Armit

Draw 5

- Meilleur 8-6 Kilgallen
- Birchard 11-1 Reed
- MacKay 9-5 Brown
- Jones 10-0 Briscoe

Draw 6

- Englot 7-2 Peterson
- Robertson 8-2 Armit
- Overton-Clapham 9-5 Menard
- Einarson 10-3 McLean

Draw 7

- Reed 11-6 Brown
- Jones 10-0 Kilgallen
- Meilleur 6-1 Briscoe
- MacKay 8-7 Birchard

Draw 8

- Overton-Clapham 10-3 Armit
- Einarson 7-3 Peterson
- Englot 8-3 McLean
- Robertson 8-6 Menard

Draw 9

- Englot 6-5 Robertson
- Menard 12-4 McLean
- Peterson 8-6 Armit
- Einarson 9-5 Overton-Clapham

Draw 10

- Birchard 7-4 Meilleur
- Briscoe 6-5 MacKay
- Reed 10-5 Kilgallen
- Jones 8-4 Brown

Draw 11

- Menard 9-3 Armit
- Robertson 6-5 Overton-Clapham
- Einarson 7-3 Englot
- McLean 7-5 Peterson

Draw 12

- Reed 6-5 MacKay
- Birchard 9-8 Brown
- Jones 9-5 Meilleur
- Kilgallen 8-7 Briscoe

Draw 13

- Robertson 10-5 Einarson
- Armit 10-1 McLean
- Peterson 6-3 Menard
- Overton-Clapham 8-4 Englot

Draw 14

- Jones 8-6 Birchard
- Briscoe 7-6 Reed
- MacKay 10-5 Kilgallen
- Brown 9-2 Meilleur

Tiebreakers

- Birchard 11-4 Reed
- Robertson 12-3 Einarson

== Playoffs ==
Page playoff system
A1	Jones	5
B1	Englot	9
A2	Birchard	6
B2	Robertson	7

Semifinal
A1	Jones	6
B2	Robertson	8

Final
B1	Englot	8
B2	Robertson	6

=== R1 vs B1 ===
Saturday, January 28, 7:45 pm

Team	1	2	3	4	5	6	7	8	9	10	Final
Jennifer Jones	1	0	2	0	0	0	0	2	0	X	5
Michelle Englot	0	1	0	2	1	1	2	0	2	X	9

=== R2 vs B2 ===
Saturday, January 28, 7:45 pm

Team	1	2	3	4	5	6	7	8	9	10	Final
Shannon Birchard	2	0	0	0	0	0	1	2	1	0	6
Darcy Robertson	0	1	1	3	1	0	0	0	0	1	7

=== Semifinal ===
Sunday, January 29, 9:00 am

Team	1	2	3	4	5	6	7	8	9	10	Final
Jennifer Jones	0	1	0	2	0	0	2	1	0	X	6
Darcy Robertson	2	0	2	0	1	1	0	0	2	X	8

=== Final ===
Sunday, January 29, 3:00 pm

Team	1	2	3	4	5	6	7	8	9	10	Final
Michelle Englot	1	1	0	2	0	0	1	1	0	2	8
Darcy Robertson	0	0	2	0	1	2	0	0	1	0	6

2017 Manitoba Scotties Tournament of Hearts

Michelle Englot
1st Manitoba Provincial Championship title
