= 2014 Manitoba Scotties Tournament of Hearts =

- Host city: Virden, Manitoba
- Arena: Tundra Oil & Gas Place
- Dates: January 8–12
- Winner: Team Carey
- Curling club: Fort Rouge CC, Winnipeg
- Skip: Chelsea Carey
- Third: Kristy McDonald
- Second: Kristen Foster
- Lead: Lindsay Titheridge
- Finalist: Kerri Einarson

The 2014 Manitoba Scotties Tournament of Hearts, the provincial women's curling championship for Manitoba, was held from January 8 to 12 at the Tundra Oil & Gas Place in Virden. The winning Chelsea Carey team went on to represent Manitoba at the 2014 Scotties Tournament of Hearts in Montreal.

== Teams ==
The teams are listed as follows:

Skip	Third	Second	Lead	Alternate	Club(s)
Deb McCreanor	Robin Campbell	Laurie Macdonell	Meghan Knutson	Lori Campbell	La Salle Curling Club, La Salle
Kim Link	Susan Baleja	Angela Wickman	Renee Fletcher	Colleen Kilgallen	East St. Paul Curling Club, East St. Paul
Kate Cameron	Erika Sigurdson	Sheyna Andries	Lindsay Baldock	Mariah Mondar	Balmoral Curling Club, Balmoral
Patricia Evans	Barb Froff	Cindy Rainville	Lorraine Poirier		Flin Flon Curling Club, Flin Flon
Lisa Menard	Melissa Barsewsky	Jennifer Rolles	Leanne Urbanovitch	Kim Merasty	Dauphin Curling Club, Dauphin
Kortney Teale	Pam Robins	Kristen McLellan	Jolene Cumming	Tanya Enns	Brandon Curling Club, Brandon
Kelsey Russill	Janelle Schwindt	Kristy Howard	Roz Ripley	Stacey Fordyce	Brandon Curling Club, Brandon
Shannon Birchard	Nicole Sigvaldason	Kelsey Boettcher	Megan Sigvaldason	Krysten Karwacki	Granite Curling Club, Winnipeg
Janet Harvey	Cherie-Ann Loder	Kristin Loder	Carey Kirby	Janice Blair	Assiniboine Memorial Curling Club, Winnipeg
Quinn Sneisen	Megan Adams	Shawna Schimnowski	Leigh Douglas	Tammy Lopushniuk	Fort Garry Curling Club, Winnipeg
Kerri Einarson	Selena Kaatz	Liz Fyfe	Kristin MacCuish		East St. Paul Curling Club, East St. Paul
Darcy Robertson	Tracey Lavery	Vanessa Foster	Michelle Kruk		Fort Rouge Curling Club, Winnipeg
Barb Spencer	Katie Spencer	Jenna Loder	Raunora Westcott		Assiniboine Memorial Curling Club, Winnipeg
Chelsea Carey	Kristy McDonald	Kristen Foster	Lindsay Titheridge		Fort Rouge Curling Club, Winnipeg
Michelle Montford	Lisa DeRiviere	Sara Van Walleghem	Sarah Neufeld	Courtney Blanchard	Assiniboine Memorial Curling Club, Winnipeg
Joelle Brown	Alyssa Vandepoele	Jolene Rutter	Kelsey Hinds	Heather Maxted	Fort Rouge Curling Club, Winnipeg

== Round-robin standings ==
Final round-robin standings

Key
Teams to Playoffs
Teams to Tiebreaker

Black Group	W	L
Kerri Einarson (East St. Paul)	7	0
Chelsea Carey (Fort Rouge)	5	2
Darcy Robertson (Fort Rouge)	5	2
Kim Link (East St. Paul)	4	3
Quinn Sneisen (Fort Garry)	3	4
Kate Cameron (Balmoral)	2	5
Deb McCreanor (La Salle)	2	5
Patricia Evans (Flin Flon)	0	7

Red Group	W	L
Barb Spencer (Assiniboine Memorial)	5	2
Janet Harvey (Assiniboine Memorial)	5	2
Joelle Brown (Fort Rouge)	4	3
Michelle Montford (Assiniboine Memorial)	4	3
Kelsey Russill (Brandon)	4	3
Kortney Teale (Brandon)	4	3
Shannon Birchard (Granite)	1	6
Lisa Menard (Dauphin)	1	6

== Round-robin results ==
All draw times are listed in Central Standard Time (UTC−6).

=== Draw 1 ===
Wednesday, January 8, 8:30 am

Sheet A	1	2	3	4	5	6	7	8	9	10	Final
Kate Cameron	2	1	0	1	0	2	3	X	X	X	9
Patricia Evans	0	0	1	0	1	0	0	X	X	X	2

Sheet B	1	2	3	4	5	6	7	8	9	10	Final
Darcy Robertson	0	0	0	0	1	0	1	0	0	1	3
Deb McCreanor	0	0	0	1	0	0	0	1	0	0	2

Sheet C	1	2	3	4	5	6	7	8	9	10	Final
Chelsea Carey	2	1	0	0	2	1	0	1	1	X	8
Quinn Sneisen	0	0	2	1	0	0	0	0	0	X	3

Sheet D	1	2	3	4	5	6	7	8	9	10	Final
Kerri Einarson	2	1	0	0	0	0	1	0	4	X	8
Kim Link	0	0	0	0	0	2	0	2	0	X	4

=== Draw 2 ===
Wednesday, January 8, 12:15 pm

Sheet A	1	2	3	4	5	6	7	8	9	10	Final
Joelle Brown	0	0	1	0	2	1	0	0	1	0	5
Kortney Teale	0	0	0	2	0	0	1	1	0	3	7

Sheet B	1	2	3	4	5	6	7	8	9	10	Final
Michelle Montford	2	0	1	0	2	0	2	3	X	X	10
Kelsey Russill	0	0	0	1	0	2	0	0	X	X	3

Sheet C	1	2	3	4	5	6	7	8	9	10	Final
Lisa Menard	0	0	0	0	0	0	0	2	0	X	2
Barb Spencer	0	0	1	1	0	1	1	0	2	X	6

Sheet D	1	2	3	4	5	6	7	8	9	10	Final
Shannon Birchard	0	3	0	0	1	0	1	1	0	X	6
Janet Harvey	1	0	2	3	0	1	0	0	4	X	11

=== Draw 3 ===
Wednesday, January 8, 4:30 pm

Sheet A	1	2	3	4	5	6	7	8	9	10	11	Final
Deb McCreanor	0	0	1	0	0	2	0	1	2	1	0	7
Chelsea Carey	3	1	0	1	1	0	1	0	0	0	1	8

Sheet B	1	2	3	4	5	6	7	8	9	10	Final
Kate Cameron	0	0	0	0	1	0	1	0	1	X	3
Kim Link	0	0	2	2	0	1	0	1	0	X	6

Sheet C	1	2	3	4	5	6	7	8	9	10	Final
Patricia Evans	0	1	0	0	0	0	X	X	X	X	1
Kerri Einarson	1	0	4	3	1	0	X	X	X	X	9

Sheet D	1	2	3	4	5	6	7	8	9	10	Final
Darcy Robertson	0	2	2	0	3	0	1	4	X	X	12
Quinn Sneisen	1	0	0	2	0	3	0	0	X	X	6

=== Draw 4 ===
Wednesday, January 8, 8:15 pm

Sheet A	1	2	3	4	5	6	7	8	9	10	Final
Kelsey Russill	0	2	0	3	1	0	1	0	1	0	8
Barb Spencer	2	0	2	0	0	2	0	2	0	2	10

Sheet B	1	2	3	4	5	6	7	8	9	10	Final
Joelle Brown	2	2	2	0	0	3	X	X	X	X	9
Shannon Birchard	0	0	0	1	1	0	X	X	X	X	2

Sheet C	1	2	3	4	5	6	7	8	9	10	Final
Kortney Teale	0	0	1	0	0	1	0	0	X	X	2
Janet Harvey	1	2	0	0	2	0	2	3	X	X	10

Sheet D	1	2	3	4	5	6	7	8	9	10	11	Final
Lisa Menard	0	2	3	0	0	1	0	1	0	0	0	7
Michelle Montford	1	0	0	1	1	0	1	0	2	1	2	9

=== Draw 5 ===
Thursday, January 9, 8:30 am

Sheet A	1	2	3	4	5	6	7	8	9	10	Final
Darcy Robertson	1	0	1	0	1	0	1	0	2	2	8
Kim Link	0	1	0	2	0	1	0	1	0	0	5

Sheet B	1	2	3	4	5	6	7	8	9	10	Final
Kerri Einarson	0	0	2	0	0	3	0	4	2	X	11
Quinn Sneisen	0	0	0	3	2	0	1	0	0	X	6

Sheet C	1	2	3	4	5	6	7	8	9	10	Final
Kate Cameron	2	0	1	1	0	0	1	2	2	X	9
Deb McCreanor	0	2	0	0	1	0	0	0	0	X	3

Sheet D	1	2	3	4	5	6	7	8	9	10	Final
Patricia Evans	0	0	0	1	0	X	X	X	X	X	1
Chelsea Carey	3	3	3	0	2	X	X	X	X	X	11

=== Draw 6 ===
Thursday, January 9, 12:15 pm

Sheet A	1	2	3	4	5	6	7	8	9	10	Final
Michelle Montford	0	3	2	0	1	2	X	X	X	X	8
Shannon Birchard	0	0	0	1	0	0	X	X	X	X	1

Sheet B	1	2	3	4	5	6	7	8	9	10	Final
Janet Harvey	0	2	0	1	0	0	2	0	3	0	8
Lisa Menard	0	0	2	0	2	0	0	2	0	3	9

Sheet C	1	2	3	4	5	6	7	8	9	10	Final
Joelle Brown	0	0	1	0	2	0	1	0	1	X	5
Kelsey Russill	3	0	0	3	0	1	0	2	0	X	9

Sheet D	1	2	3	4	5	6	7	8	9	10	Final
Kortney Teale	0	0	0	0	0	1	0	1	0	X	2
Barb Spencer	0	0	1	0	0	0	2	0	2	X	5

=== Draw 7 ===
Thursday, January 9, 4:00 pm

Sheet A	1	2	3	4	5	6	7	8	9	10	Final
Quinn Sneisen	2	0	0	0	1	1	0	4	X	X	8
Kate Cameron	0	0	1	1	0	0	0	0	X	X	2

Sheet B	1	2	3	4	5	6	7	8	9	10	Final
Chelsea Carey	0	0	1	0	1	0	1	0	X	X	3
Kim Link	2	0	0	2	0	3	0	3	X	X	10

Sheet C	1	2	3	4	5	6	7	8	9	10	Final
Patricia Evans	0	0	0	1	0	0	1	0	2	X	4
Darcy Robertson	1	2	1	0	1	1	0	1	0	X	7

Sheet D	1	2	3	4	5	6	7	8	9	10	Final
Kerri Einarson	2	0	1	2	3	X	X	X	X	X	8
Deb McCreanor	0	0	0	0	0	X	X	X	X	X	0

=== Draw 8 ===
Thursday, January 9, 7:45 pm

Sheet A	1	2	3	4	5	6	7	8	9	10	Final
Lisa Menard	0	1	0	0	0	1	0	2	0	X	4
Joelle Brown	1	0	1	1	1	0	2	0	4	X	10

Sheet B	1	2	3	4	5	6	7	8	9	10	Final
Barb Spencer	2	0	3	0	2	0	2	X	X	X	9
Shannon Birchard	0	1	0	1	0	1	0	X	X	X	3

Sheet C	1	2	3	4	5	6	7	8	9	10	11	Final
Kortney Teale	0	2	0	1	1	1	0	0	2	0	1	8
Michelle Montford	3	0	0	0	0	0	0	1	0	3	0	7

Sheet D	1	2	3	4	5	6	7	8	9	10	Final
Janet Harvey	0	1	1	1	4	0	0	2	X	X	9
Kelsey Russill	1	0	0	0	0	0	1	0	X	X	2

=== Draw 9 ===
Friday, January 10, 8:30 am

Sheet A	1	2	3	4	5	6	7	8	9	10	Final
Michelle Montford	0	0	0	1	0	0	0	1	X	X	2
Janet Harvey	0	2	1	0	1	1	1	0	X	X	6

Sheet B	1	2	3	4	5	6	7	8	9	10	Final
Kelsey Russill	1	0	1	0	3	0	2	0	0	0	7
Kortney Teale	0	1	0	1	0	1	0	2	0	1	6

Sheet C	1	2	3	4	5	6	7	8	9	10	Final
Shannon Birchard	0	0	0	2	0	2	0	0	2	1	7
Lisa Menard	0	1	1	0	1	0	2	1	0	0	6

Sheet D	1	2	3	4	5	6	7	8	9	10	11	Final
Joelle Brown	0	0	2	0	0	2	0	1	0	0	1	6
Barb Spencer	0	1	0	0	2	0	1	0	0	1	0	5

=== Draw 10 ===
Friday, January 10, 12:15 pm

Sheet A	1	2	3	4	5	6	7	8	9	10	Final
Darcy Robertson	1	0	0	2	0	0	0	1	0	0	4
Kerri Einarson	0	1	1	0	1	1	0	0	0	1	5

Sheet B	1	2	3	4	5	6	7	8	9	10	Final
Deb McCreanor	1	0	1	3	0	0	3	4	X	X	12
Patricia Evans	0	1	0	0	1	2	0	0	X	X	4

Sheet C	1	2	3	4	5	6	7	8	9	10	Final
Kim Link	0	1	0	2	0	0	0	1	0	0	4
Quinn Sneisen	1	0	1	0	0	0	1	0	0	2	5

Sheet D	1	2	3	4	5	6	7	8	9	10	Final
Kate Cameron	2	1	0	1	0	1	0	0	0	X	5
Chelsea Carey	0	0	1	0	2	0	2	1	1	X	7

=== Draw 11 ===
Friday, January 10, 4:00 pm

Sheet A	1	2	3	4	5	6	7	8	9	10	Final
Kelsey Russill	2	2	0	2	1	0	1	2	X	X	10
Lisa Menard	0	0	1	0	0	3	0	0	X	X	4

Sheet B	1	2	3	4	5	6	7	8	9	10	Final
Janet Harvey	0	0	1	1	2	0	0	2	0	0	6
Joelle Brown	1	0	0	0	0	1	1	0	1	1	5

Sheet C	1	2	3	4	5	6	7	8	9	10	Final
Barb Spencer	0	0	0	2	0	1	0	2	1	0	6
Michelle Montford	0	2	1	0	1	0	2	0	0	1	7

Sheet D	1	2	3	4	5	6	7	8	9	10	Final
Shannon Birchard	0	0	1	0	0	1	0	0	X	X	2
Kortney Teale	0	3	0	1	2	0	2	0	X	X	8

=== Draw 12 ===
Friday, January 10, 7:45 pm

Sheet A	1	2	3	4	5	6	7	8	9	10	Final
Deb McCreanor	0	2	0	2	0	0	0	0	3	X	7
Quinn Sneisen	1	0	1	0	3	0	0	0	0	X	5

Sheet B	1	2	3	4	5	6	7	8	9	10	Final
Kerri Einarson	2	0	2	0	3	0	1	0	1	X	9
Kate Cameron	0	1	0	2	0	1	0	2	0	X	6

Sheet C	1	2	3	4	5	6	7	8	9	10	Final
Chelsea Carey	0	0	1	0	0	2	0	4	0	X	7
Darcy Robertson	0	0	0	1	1	0	2	0	1	X	5

Sheet D	1	2	3	4	5	6	7	8	9	10	Final
Kim Link	2	0	0	3	0	0	4	0	2	X	11
Patricia Evans	0	0	1	0	3	0	0	1	0	X	5

=== Draw 13 ===
Saturday, January 11, 8:30 am

Sheet A	1	2	3	4	5	6	7	8	9	10	Final
Barb Spencer	2	0	0	2	1	0	0	2	0	2	9
Janet Harvey	0	2	3	0	0	0	1	0	0	0	6

Sheet B	1	2	3	4	5	6	7	8	9	10	Final
Lisa Menard	2	0	1	0	0	0	1	0	X	X	4
Kortney Teale	0	2	0	1	2	1	0	3	X	X	9

Sheet C	1	2	3	4	5	6	7	8	9	10	11	Final
Shannon Birchard	0	3	1	0	0	1	0	1	0	1	0	7
Kelsey Russill	1	0	0	2	1	0	2	0	1	0	1	8

Sheet D	1	2	3	4	5	6	7	8	9	10	Final
Michelle Montford	0	0	0	1	1	0	0	X	X	X	2
Joelle Brown	1	1	1	0	0	3	4	X	X	X	10

=== Draw 14 ===
Saturday, January 11, 12:15 pm

Sheet A	1	2	3	4	5	6	7	8	9	10	Final
Chelsea Carey	0	0	0	0	1	1	0	1	0	X	3
Kerri Einarson	0	1	1	1	0	0	2	0	2	X	7

Sheet B	1	2	3	4	5	6	7	8	9	10	Final
Quinn Sneisen	0	2	1	0	1	0	2	3	0	X	9
Patricia Evans	1	0	0	2	0	1	0	0	1	X	5

Sheet C	1	2	3	4	5	6	7	8	9	10	Final
Kim Link	0	0	2	1	0	3	0	2	X	X	8
Deb McCreanor	0	0	0	0	2	0	1	0	X	X	3

Sheet D	1	2	3	4	5	6	7	8	9	10	Final
Darcy Robertson	1	0	4	0	0	2	0	1	1	X	9
Kate Cameron	0	1	0	1	1	0	3	0	0	X	6

== Tiebreaker ==
Saturday, January 11, 2:00 pm

Team	1	2	3	4	5	6	7	8	9	10	Final
Chelsea Carey	0	0	2	1	0	1	0	0	1	2	7
Darcy Robertson	0	1	0	0	1	0	1	0	0	0	3

== Playoffs ==
Page playoff system
R1	Barb Spencer	4
B1	Kerri Einarson	6
R2	Janet Harvey	6
B2	Chelsea Carey	8

Semifinal
R1	Barb Spencer	2
B2	Chelsea Carey	8

Final
B1	Kerri Einarson	2
B2	Chelsea Carey	6

=== R1 vs. B1 ===
Saturday, January 11, 6:00 pm

Team	1	2	3	4	5	6	7	8	9	10	Final
Barb Spencer	0	1	0	0	0	1	1	0	1	0	4
Kerri Einarson	0	0	0	0	2	0	0	1	0	3	6

=== R2 vs. B2 ===
Saturday, January 11, 8:30 pm

Team	1	2	3	4	5	6	7	8	9	10	Final
Janet Harvey	0	0	2	0	1	1	1	0	1	0	6
Chelsea Carey	0	3	0	3	0	0	0	1	0	1	8

=== Semifinal ===
Sunday, January 12, 11:30 am

Team	1	2	3	4	5	6	7	8	9	10	Final
Barb Spencer	0	0	0	1	0	0	0	1	0	X	2
Chelsea Carey	0	2	0	0	0	1	1	0	4	X	8

=== Final ===
Sunday, January 12, 4:00 pm

Team	1	2	3	4	5	6	7	8	9	10	Final
Kerri Einarson	1	0	0	0	0	1	0	0	0	X	2
Chelsea Carey	0	0	0	2	1	0	0	0	3	X	6

2014 Manitoba Scotties Tournament of Hearts

Chelsea Carey
1st Manitoba Provincial Championship title
