= Kristin Gordon =

Canadian curler (born 1992)

- Curler
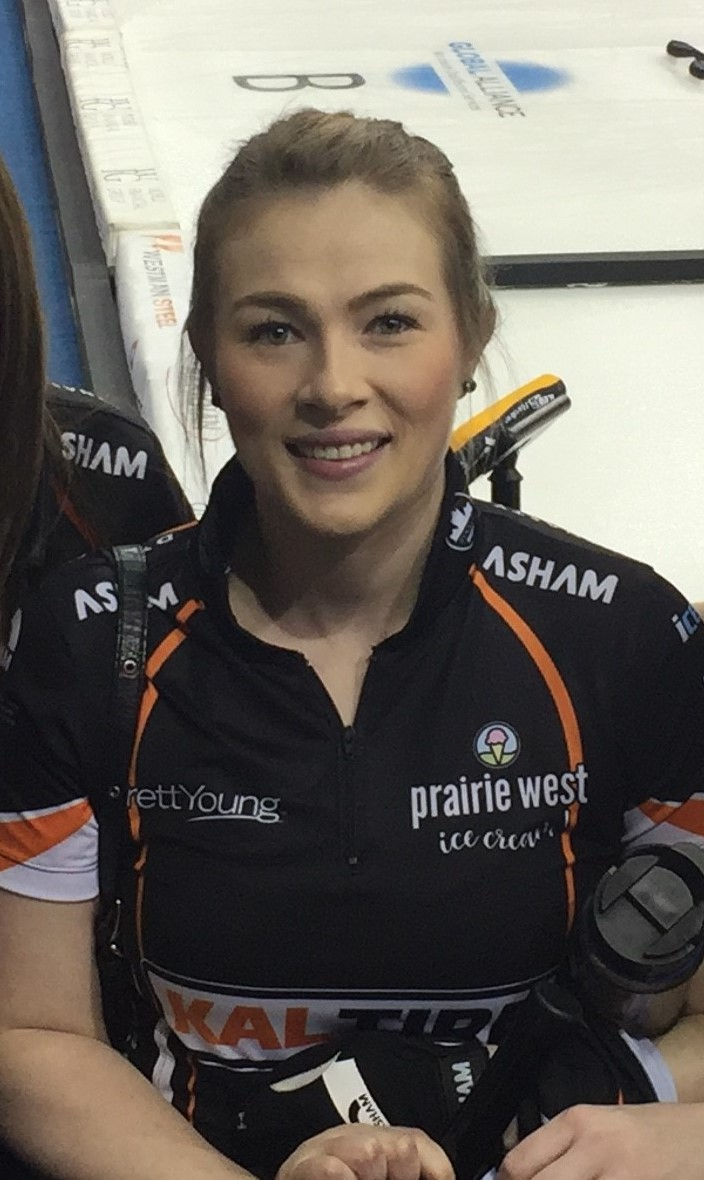
- Gordon at the 2019 Players' Championship
- Born: Kristin MacCuish; December 8, 1992 (age 33); Winnipeg, Manitoba

Team
- Curling club: East St. Paul CC, East St. Paul, MB

Curling career
- Member Association: Manitoba
- Hearts: 10 (2013, 2016, 2018, 2019, 2021, 2022, 2023, 2024, 2025, 2026)
- Top CTRS ranking: 1st (2021–22)
- Grand Slam victories: 3 (2016 National, 2019 Masters, 2021 Masters)
Medal record
Women's curling
Representing Manitoba
Canadian Olympic Curling Trials
Silver medal – second place	2021 Saskatoon
Scotties Tournament of Hearts
Silver medal – second place	2013 Kingston
Silver medal – second place	2026 Mississauga
Representing (Manitoba) Team Wild Card
Scotties Tournament of Hearts
Silver medal – second place	2018 Penticton

Kristin Gordon (born December 8, 1992, as Kristin MacCuish) is a Canadian curler from Winnipeg.

== Career ==
=== Juniors and University (2011–2013) ===
Gordon played second for Team Manitoba at the 2012 Canadian Junior Curling Championships, on a team skipped by Shannon Birchard. The team finished first after the round robin, but lost in the final to Team Alberta, skipped by Jocelyn Peterman. The next season, Gordon and third Selena Kaatz left the Birchard rink to form their own team at the Manitoba Junior provincials but lost to their former skip in the final.

=== Early women's (2013–2015) ===
Gordon joined Kerri Einarson's team in 2013. In their first season, they played in one slam, the 2013 Colonial Square Ladies Classic (not qualifying) and the 2014 Manitoba Scotties Tournament of Hearts, losing in the final to Team Chelsea Carey. That season, Gordon was invited to play for the Jennifer Jones rink (Team Manitoba) at the 2013 Scotties Tournament of Hearts as the team's alternate. Gordon played in two games, and threw four rocks in total. The team would finish in second place.

The next season the Einarson team again lost in the final of the Manitoba Hearts, losing this time to Team Jennifer Jones.

=== Breakthrough season and Olympic pre-trials (2015–2018) ===
The 2015-16 curling season would be the breakthrough year for the Einarson rink. The team begun the season by winning the Tier 2 event of the 2015 GSOC Tour Challenge. The team finally won the Manitoba Scotties in 2016, and represented Manitoba at the national 2016 Scotties Tournament of Hearts. There, the team would make the playoffs, but would end up losing in the bronze medal game, settling for fourth place. Elsewhere on the World Curling Tour, the team would play in four slams, making it to the semifinals at three events.

The team played in their first Canada Cup in 2016, losing in the semifinals. On the Tour, the team played in five Grand Slams, and would win their first title at the 2016 Boost National. At the 2017 Manitoba Scotties Tournament of Hearts, the team failed to make the playoffs.

The Einarson rink qualified for the 2017 Canadian Olympic Pre-Trials, but would lose in a tiebreaker game. On the tour, the team would win the 2017 Icebreaker at The Granite and would make it to the finals of the 2017 Masters of Curling. They qualified for the first ever Wild Card game at the 2018 Scotties Tournament of Hearts, where they beat Chelsea Carey for the right to represent "Team Wild Card" that year at the Scotties. They finished the round robin and championship pool with a 9–2 record which qualified them for the 1 vs. 2 page playoff game. They lost to Team Manitoba (Jennifer Jones) but rebounded against Nova Scotia's Mary-Anne Arsenault in the semifinal. They couldn't get by Jones in the final, settling for a silver medal. They finished their season with a semifinal finish at the 2018 Players' Championship and a runner-up finish at the 2018 Champions Cup.

=== Tracy Fleury joins the team (2018–2022) ===
Gordon would stay with Selena Njegovan and Liz Fyfe for the 2018–19 season but would bring on a new skip, Tracy Fleury for the 2019–2022 Olympic quadrennial. Fleury is from Sudbury and would play as their designated out-of-province curler. The team had a nearly full schedule in Grand Slam events, beginning the season at the Elite 10, where they missed the playoffs after winning just one game. Next, they made it to the quarterfinals of the 2018 Masters, which they followed up by making it to the finals of the 2018 Tour Challenge, where they lost to Rachel Homan. Outside of the Grand Slam tour, they were invited to represent Canada at the second leg of the Curling World Cup, which they finished with a 4–2 record, narrowly missing the final. The following week they were back into a Grand Slam event, the 2018 National, where they won just one game. The following month, the team played in the 2019 Canadian Open, again missing the playoffs. The team found success in provincial playdowns, winning the 2019 Manitoba Scotties Tournament of Hearts defeating her old skip Kerri Einarson 13–7 in the final to represent Manitoba at the 2019 Scotties Tournament of Hearts. A week after provincials, the team played in at the 2019 TSN All-Star Curling Skins Game where they lost to Jennifer Jones by $4,000 in the final. The team did earn $32,500 during the tournament. At the Hearts, Manitoba went 4–3 record in pool play, but lost to British Columbia's Sarah Wark rink in a tiebreaker to get into the championship pool, which eliminated the team from contention. They finished the season off by making it to the quarterfinals of the 2019 Players' Championship.

To start the 2019–20 season, Fleury and her team finished fourth at the 2019 Hokkaido Bank Curling Classic. Later that month, they won the 2019 Cargill Curling Training Centre Icebreaker. Next they played in the 2019 AMJ Campbell Shorty Jenkins Classic where they once again had a successful weekend, losing in the final to Jennifer Jones. Two weeks later, they played in the 2019 Colonial Square Ladies Classic where they went undefeated until the final where they came up short to Homan. Team Fleury had two more playoff finishes at the 2019 Curlers Corner Autumn Gold Curling Classic and the 2019 Canad Inns Women's Classic, where they lost in the semifinals and quarterfinals respectively. Their next event was the first Grand Slam of the season, the 2019 Masters where they qualified for the playoffs with a 3–1 record. With wins over Elena Stern in the quarterfinals and Anna Hasselborg in the semifinal, Team Fleury made their second Grand Slam final since forming. They would be successful this time, defeating Sayaka Yoshimura to claim the Grand Slam title. The next week, they had a quarterfinal finish at the second Slam of the season, the 2019 Tour Challenge. At the Canada Cup, the Fleury team once again had a successful run, qualifying for the playoffs with a 5–1 record. They downed Chelsea Carey 9–4 in the semifinal before coming up short to Rachel Homan in the final. Team Fleury capped off the 2019 part of the season with a semifinal finish at the 2019 Boost National Grand Slam. This meant they qualified for the playoffs in all ten of the events they played in to start the season. To start 2020, the Fleury rink along with five other Canadian rinks, represented Canada at the 2020 Continental Cup. Team Canada did not have a good week, losing to the European's by fifteen points. They missed the playoffs for the first time during the season when they were knocked out of the triple knockout format at the 2020 Canadian Open. At the 2020 Manitoba Scotties Tournament of Hearts, the provincial championship, Team Fleury lost the semifinal to Jennifer Jones. They did have another chance to qualify for the 2020 Scotties Tournament of Hearts through the Wild Card play in game which they also lost to Jones. It would be the team's last event of the season as both the Players' Championship and the Champions Cup Grand Slam events were cancelled due to the COVID-19 pandemic.

Team Fleury added longtime skip and 2013 Canadian Olympic Curling Trials silver medallist Sherry Middaugh to coach the team for the 2020–21 season. Due to the COVID-19 pandemic in Manitoba, the 2021 provincial championship was cancelled. As the reigning provincials champions Team Kerri Einarson were already qualified for the Scotties as Team Canada, Team Jennifer Jones was given the invitation to represent Manitoba at the 2021 Scotties Tournament of Hearts as they were the 2020 provincial runners-up. However, due to many provinces cancelling their provincial championships as a result of the COVID-19 pandemic in Canada, Curling Canada added three Wild Card teams to the national championship, which were based on the CTRS standings from the 2019–20 season. Because Team Fleury ranked 2nd on the CTRS and kept at least three of their four players together for the 2020–21 season, they got the first Wild Card spot at the 2021 Scotties in Calgary, Alberta. Tracy Fleury would, however, not compete at the Hearts, as she wanted to stay home with her baby daughter, who was diagnosed with infantile spasms, a rare form of epilepsy. In her place was two-time Scotties champion Chelsea Carey who was left without a team for the season. At the Hearts, Carey led the team to a 6–6 eighth-place finish. Fleury returned to skip the team at the 2021 Champions Cup, held in the same Calgary bubble in April 2021. It was the first time Gordon, Selena Njegovan and Liz Fyfe had seen her in over a year. At the Champions Cup, Fleury led the team to a 4–0 round robin record before losing in the semifinal to Switzerland's Silvana Tirinzoni. Fleury left the bubble after the event, and was once again replaced by Chelsea Carey for the 2021 Players' Championship. There, Carey led the team to a 2–3 round robin record, missing the playoffs.

With Fleury back fulltime for the 2021–22 season, the team began the season at the 2021 Oakville Labour Day Classic. There, they went a perfect 7–0 to claim the title, defeating Suzanne Birt 8–7 in the final. Two weeks later, they won their second tour event of the season at the 2021 Sherwood Park Women's Curling Classic. After finishing 4–0 through the round robin, they defeated Cory Christensen, Kim Eun-jung, and Kerri Einarson in the quarterfinals, semifinals and final respectively to win their second title of the season. After a quarterfinal finish at the 2021 Curlers Corner Autumn Gold Curling Classic, the team played in the first slam event of the season, the 2021 Masters. In the triple knockout qualifying round, they finished 3–1 and qualified through the B Side. They then defeated Einarson 6–2 in the quarterfinals and topped Alina Kovaleva 8–4 in the semifinals to qualify for their third slam final as a team, where they faced Team Jennifer Jones. After Fleury took an early lead, Jones tied things up in eighth to force an extra end. In the extra, Team Fleury secured the win with a double takeout and defended their Masters title from 2019. At the second Grand Slam of the season, the 2021 National, the team posted undefeated record until they reached the final where they were defeated by Sweden's Anna Hasselborg 9–6 in an extra end.

Then came the 2021 Canadian Olympic Curling Trials, held November 20 to 28 in Saskatoon, Saskatchewan. After their successful start to the 2021–22 season, Team Fleury entered the Trials as the topped ranked women's team. Through the round robin, the team went undefeated with a perfect 8–0 record, becoming only the second women's rink to do so following Chelsea Carey in 2017. This earned them a bye to the Olympic Trials final where they would face Team Jennifer Jones, who they previously defeated in their final round robin game. The team began the game with hammer, but immediately gave up a stolen point. They eventually tied the game after four ends, and later after seven ends 4–4. After a blank in the eighth, Team Fleury earned their first lead of the game with a steal of one in the ninth. In the tenth end, Jennifer Jones had an open hit-and-stick to win the game, however, her shooter rolled two far and she only got one. This sent the game to an extra end where Team Fleury would hold the hammer. On her final shot, Fleury attempted a soft-weight hit on a Jones stone partially buried behind a guard. Her rock, however, curled too much and hit the guard, giving up a steal of one and the game to Team Jones. Team Fleury earned the silver medal from the event.

At the 2022 Manitoba Scotties Tournament of Hearts, the team couldn't rebound from their disappointing finish at the Trials, finishing 5–3 and failing to qualify for the playoff round. Despite this, they still qualified for the 2022 Scotties Tournament of Hearts, again as Wild Card #1 after Curling Canada used the same format from the 2021 event. Upon arrival into Thunder Bay for the event, the team announced that Tracy Fleury had tested positive for COVID-19 and would have to sit out much of the event. Because of this, third Selena Njegovan stepped up to skip the team with alternate Robyn Njegovan coming in to play third. Without Fleury, the team had a dominant performance through their seven games, finishing with a 6–1 record. Fleury then returned for the teams' final round robin game where they picked up another victory to close out the round robin first place in their pool. Despite earning a bye from the elimination games, the team lost the seeding game and then the 3 vs. 4 page playoff game, eliminating them from the event in fourth place.

On March 16, 2022, the team announced they would be parting ways at the end of the 2021–22 season. Gordon and longtime teammate Selena Njegovan later announced they would be joining Kaitlyn Lawes and Jocelyn Peterman of Team Jones to form a new team for the 2022–23 season. Lawes would skip the team, with Njegovan playing third, Peterman at second and Gordon at lead.

Team Fleury still had two more events together before parting ways, the 2022 Players' Championship and 2022 Champions Cup Grand Slams. At the Players', the team qualified through the A-side with an undefeated record, earning them the top spot in the playoff round. They then defeated Sweden's Isabella Wranå in the quarterfinals before being eliminated by the Einarson team in the semifinals. At the Champions Cup, Team Fleury went 3–2 in pool play, and then lost in the quarterfinals to Gim Eun-ji.

=== Team Lawes (2022–present) ===
The new Lawes rink began the 2022–23 season with a second-place finish at the 2022 Oslo Cup. After going undefeated in the round robin, they beat Marianne Rørvik in the semifinal before losing 5–3 to Anna Hasselborg in the final. They were able to pick up their first tour victory at the Mother Club Fall Curling Classic, winning 6–2 in the final over Sarah Anderson. At the 2022 PointsBet Invitational, Team Lawes lost in the semifinal to Team Scheidegger. In the first Slam of the season, the 2022 National, the team advanced to the semifinals where they were stopped by Silvana Tirinzoni 7–5. They also qualified for the playoffs at the 2022 Tour Challenge where they lost in the quarterfinals to Rachel Homan. Following a quarterfinal finish at the 2022 Curlers Corner Autumn Gold Curling Classic, Lawes went on maternity leave. During that time, Selena Njegovan took over skipping the team, leading them to a victory at the 2022 Stu Sells 1824 Halifax Classic and a quarterfinal finish at the 2022 Masters. Lawes returned for the 2023 Canadian Open where the team missed the playoffs with a 2–3 record. At the 2023 Manitoba Scotties Tournament of Hearts, the team was eliminated in the semifinal after losing 8–5 to Abby Ackland. Despite this, they still qualified for the 2023 Scotties Tournament of Hearts as a Wild Card team. After a 5–3 record, they lost in a tiebreaker to Nova Scotia, skipped by Christina Black. The team finished the season at the 2023 Players' Championship and the 2023 Champions Cup, missing the playoffs at both.

Back together for the 2023–24 season, Team Lawes had promising results to begin the season. In October, they had two straight semifinal finishes at the 2023 PointsBet Invitational and the 2023 Players Open, losing out to Kerri Einarson and Anna Hasselborg respectively. At the first Slam of the season, the 2023 Tour Challenge, the team began with two straight losses before rallying together four straight victories to reach their first Grand Slam final as a unit. There, they lost 7–4 to Team Jones. They would miss the playoffs at the other four Slams that season, however. In November, they made the semifinals at the Red Deer Curling Classic where they fell 5–3 to Team Homan. They followed this up with a third-place finish at the 2023 Karuizawa International Curling Championships in Japan. Entering the 2024 Manitoba Scotties Tournament of Hearts as the top seeded team, Team Lawes lost just one game en route to claiming the provincial title, defeating Beth Peterson 9–8 in the championship game. This qualified them for the 2024 Scotties Tournament of Hearts where they did not a good start, losing three of their first four games. Sitting 3–4 heading into their last round robin game, they were able to beat Northern Ontario's Krista McCarville 6–5. This created a five-way tie for third with Northern Ontario, British Columbia, Quebec, and Saskatchewan. With tiebreaker games abolished and the first tiebreaker (which was head-to-head between all tied teams) tied as well at 2–2, cumulative last stone draw distance between all the teams was used to decide who would make the playoffs. The Lawes rink finished first with a 231.6 and thus earned a spot in the playoffs. Facing Alberta's Selena Sturmay in the 3 vs. 4 page qualifier, the team lost 8–5 and were eliminated. They finished their season with a 1–4 record at the 2024 Players' Championship.

The 2024–25 season saw Team Lawes have their least successful year of the quad as after starting strong, they ended up falling out of qualification for Grand Slam events. To begin, however, the team reached three straight semifinals at the 2024 Saville Shootout, 2024 PointsBet Invitational and the 2024 Tour Challenge, losing to Team Homan at the latter two. Lawes then went on maternity leave and Njegovan again took over the team as skip. During this time, the team played in three events and only qualified at one of them, losing in the semifinals of the Saville Grand Prix to Kerri Einarson. With Lawes back in the lineup, the team missed three more consecutive playoffs, losing in a tiebreaker at the 2025 Masters to Satsuki Fujisawa. Having pre-qualified for the 2025 Scotties Tournament of Hearts due to their CTRS ranking from the 2023–24 season, Team Lawes lost three of their first four games to start the event 1–3. They then decided to make a change with Njegovan taking over skipping duties while Lawes remained throwing fourth stones. This move proved successful as the team won their next three games to remain in contention. Facing Team Einarson in their final round robin game, Team Lawes lost 9–6 and were eliminated from the event at 4–4. They ended the season ranked 19th, just outside of Grand Slam qualification.

Looking to turn things around for the final year of the Olympic quadrennial, the Lawes rink had a strong start to the season by winning their second event, the Saville Grand Prix. In the playoffs, they beat Kate Cameron in the quarterfinals before knocking off Korea's Gim Eun-ji and Park You-been in the semifinals and final respectively. They then played in the Tier 2 side of the 2025 Masters where they lost in the quarterfinals to Madeleine Dupont. In their next three events, Team Lawes struggled to find consistency, missing the playoffs at all three. This led them into the 2025 Canadian Olympic Curling Trials, which they directly qualified for through CTRS points. There, the team continued to see mixed results, finishing the round robin at 4–3. This tied them for third place, however, they missed out on the playoffs due to a poor Draw Shot Challenge (last stone draw). To wrap up 2025, the team had a strong run at the 2025 Canadian Open Tier 2, advancing to the finals where they were defeated by Taylor Reese-Hansen. In the new year, the team continued the season at the 2026 RME Women of the Rings Manitoba women's provincial. After a previously undefeated 7–0 record, Team Lawes fell 9–7 in the final game to Beth Peterson after Lawes' final shot for the win wrecked on a guard. However, due to Rachel Homan having to withdraw from the 2026 Scotties Tournament of Hearts as the Scotties schedule conflicted with the Olympics, an additional spot was instead given to Lawes as the highest CTRS ranked non-qualified team following the completion of all provincial and territorial championships. For the event, Laura Walker played second for the team, replacing Jocelyn Peterman who was competing in the mixed doubles tournament at the Olympics. At the Hearts, Team Lawes made the most of their second chance, going undefeated with an 8–0 record in the round robin and beating Christina Black and Kerri Einarson in playoff matchups to qualify for the Scotties final. However, similarly to their record at the 2026 Manitoba championships where they went undefeated throughout the championship but lost in the final, Team Lawes would lose in a rematch against Einarson 4–3 in the Scotties final, finishing with a silver medal.

On March 26, 2026, Team Lawes announced their disbandment with Gordon stepping back from competitive play for the 2026–27 season.

== Personal life ==
Her aunt is Olympic gold medallist Jill Officer, who played second on Team Jennifer Jones. She attended Athabasca University. She married fellow curler Rob Gordon in July 2024. She is employed as a direct support worker for New Directions.

== Grand Slam record ==
Key
C	Champion
F	Lost in Final
SF	Lost in Semifinal
QF	Lost in Quarterfinals
R16	Lost in the round of 16
Q	Did not advance to playoffs
T2	Played in Tier 2 event
DNP	Did not participate in event
N/A	Not a Grand Slam event that season

Event	2015–16	2016–17	2017–18	2018–19	2019–20	2020–21	2021–22	2022–23	2023–24	2024–25	2025–26
Masters	SF	Q	F	QF	C	N/A	C	QF	Q	Q	T2
Tour Challenge	T2	Q	T2	F	QF	N/A	N/A	QF	F	SF	Q
The National	Q	C	Q	Q	SF	N/A	F	SF	Q	Q	Q
Canadian Open	DNP	Q	Q	Q	Q	N/A	N/A	Q	Q	Q	T2
Players'	SF	DNP	SF	QF	N/A	Q	SF	Q	Q	DNP	DNP
Champions Cup	SF	Q	F	DNP	N/A	SF	QF	Q	N/A	N/A	N/A

=== Former events ===
Event	2013–14	2014–15	2015–16	2016–17	2017–18	2018–19
Elite 10	N/A	N/A	N/A	N/A	N/A	Q
Colonial Square	Q	DNP	N/A	N/A	N/A	N/A

== Teams ==
Season	Skip	Third	Second	Lead
2009–10	Alyssa Calvert	Selena Kaatz	Kristin MacCuish	Lindsay Baldock
2010–11	Selena Kaatz (Fourth)	Alyssa Calvert (Skip)	Kristin MacCuish	Lindsay Baldock
2011–12	Shannon Birchard	Selena Kaatz	Kristin MacCuish	Mariah Mondor
2012–13	Selena Kaatz	Briane Meilleur	Kristin MacCuish	Katherine Doerksen
2013–14	Kerri Einarson	Selena Kaatz	Liz Fyfe	Kristin MacCuish
2014–15	Kerri Einarson	Selena Kaatz	Liz Fyfe	Kristin MacCuish
2015–16	Kerri Einarson	Selena Kaatz	Liz Fyfe	Kristin MacCuish
2016–17	Kerri Einarson	Selena Kaatz	Liz Fyfe	Kristin MacCuish
2017–18	Kerri Einarson	Selena Kaatz	Liz Fyfe	Kristin MacCuish
2018–19	Tracy Fleury	Selena Njegovan	Liz Fyfe	Kristin MacCuish
2019–20	Tracy Fleury	Selena Njegovan	Liz Fyfe	Kristin MacCuish
2020–21	Tracy Fleury	Selena Njegovan	Liz Fyfe	Kristin MacCuish
2021–22	Tracy Fleury	Selena Njegovan	Liz Fyfe	Kristin MacCuish
2022–23	Kaitlyn Lawes	Selena Njegovan	Jocelyn Peterman	Kristin MacCuish
2023–24	Kaitlyn Lawes	Selena Njegovan	Jocelyn Peterman	Kristin MacCuish
2024–25	Kaitlyn Lawes	Selena Njegovan	Jocelyn Peterman	Kristin Gordon
2025–26	Kaitlyn Lawes (Fourth)	Selena Njegovan (Skip)	Jocelyn Peterman	Kristin Gordon
