= 2016 Boost National =

Grand Slam of Curling event

2016 The National
- Host city: Sault Ste. Marie, Ontario
- Arena: Essar Centre
- Dates: December 6–11
- Men's winner: (Ontario) Team Jacobs
- Curling club: Community First CC, Sault Ste. Marie, ON
- Skip: Brad Jacobs
- Third: Ryan Fry
- Second: E. J. Harnden
- Lead: Ryan Harnden
- Finalist: (Manitoba) Reid Carruthers
- Women's winner: (Manitoba) Team Einarson
- Curling club: East St. Paul CC, East St. Paul, MB
- Skip: Kerri Einarson
- Third: Selena Kaatz
- Second: Liz Fyfe
- Lead: Kristin MacCuish
- Finalist: (Switzerland) Silvana Tirinzoni

The 2016 National (branded as the 2016 BOOST National for sponsorship reasons) was held from December 6 to 11 at the Essar Centre in Sault Ste. Marie, Ontario. This was the third Grand Slam of Curling event and the second major of the 2016–17 curling season.

On the men's side, the defending Olympic champion Brad Jacobs rink won their second career Grand Slam event. The team won the event on home ice, as they are from the Soo. To win, they defeated the Reid Carruthers rink from Manitoba, who had just come from winning the 2016 Canada Cup of Curling a week earlier. On the women's side, the Manitoba-based Kerri Einarson rink won their first career Grand Slam event, defeating the Silvana Tirinzoni team from Switzerland in the final. Both the Jacobs and Einarson rink took home $30,000 for their championship wins.

== Qualification ==
The top 14 ranked men's and women's teams on the World Curling Tour's "Order of Merit" rankings as of October 31, 2016 as well as a sponsor's exemption qualified for the event. In the event that a team declines their invitation, the next-ranked team on the world team ranking is invited until the field is complete.

=== Men ===
Top order of merit men's teams:

1. (Newfoundland and Labrador) Brad Gushue
2. (Alberta) Kevin Koe
3. (Manitoba) Reid Carruthers
4. (Sweden) Niklas Edin
5. (Ontario) John Epping
6. (Ontario) Brad Jacobs
7. (Manitoba) Mike McEwen
8. (Saskatchewan) Steve Laycock
9. (Scotland) David Murdoch
10. (Alberta) Charley Thomas
11. (British Columbia) John Morris
12. (Alberta) Brendan Bottcher
13. (Norway) ~~Thomas Ulsrud~~
14. (Switzerland) Peter de Cruz
15. (United States) John Shuster

Tanner Horgan's rink from Sudbury, Ontario was invited as a sponsor exemption. His team was ranked 64th and was the 2nd best team from Northern Ontario after Brad Jacobs.

=== Women ===
Top order of merit women's teams:

1. (Ontario) Rachel Homan
2. (Manitoba) Jennifer Jones
3. (Switzerland) Silvana Tirinzoni
4. (Scotland) Eve Muirhead
5. (Alberta) Val Sweeting
6. (Ontario) Allison Flaxey
7. (Alberta) Chelsea Carey
8. (Sweden) Anna Hasselborg
9. (Alberta) Kelsey Rocque
10. (Russia) Anna Sidorova
11. (South Korea) Kim Eun-jung
12. (Ontario) Tracy Fleury
13. (Manitoba) Kerri Einarson
14. (Switzerland) Binia Feltscher

Krista McCarville's rink from Thunder Bay, Ontario was invited as a sponsor exemption. Her team was ranked 22nd and was the 2nd best team from Northern Ontario after Tracy Fleury.

== Men ==
=== Teams ===
The teams are listed as follows:

Skip	Third	Second	Lead	Locale	OOM rank
Brendan Bottcher	Pat Simmons	Brad Thiessen	Karrick Martin	Edmonton, Alberta	13
Reid Carruthers	Braeden Moskowy	Derek Samagalski	Colin Hodgson	Winnipeg, Manitoba	2
Benoît Schwarz (Fourth)	Claudio Pätz	Peter de Cruz (Skip)	Valentin Tanner	Geneva, Switzerland	12
Niklas Edin	Oskar Eriksson	Rasmus Wranå	Christoffer Sundgren	Karlstad, Sweden	4
John Epping	Mat Camm	Pat Janssen	Tim March	Toronto, Ontario	5
Brad Gushue	Mark Nichols	Brett Gallant	Geoff Walker	St. John's, Newfoundland and Labrador	1
Tanner Horgan	Jacob Horgan	Nicholas Bissonnette	Maxime Blais	Sudbury, Ontario	61 (Note: Qualified as sponsor exemption)
Brad Jacobs	Ryan Fry	E. J. Harnden	Ryan Harnden	Sault Ste. Marie, Ontario	7
Kevin Koe	Marc Kennedy	Brent Laing	Ben Hebert	Calgary, Alberta	3
Steve Laycock	Kirk Muyres	Colton Flasch	Dallan Muyres	Saskatoon, Saskatchewan	8
Mike McEwen	B. J. Neufeld	Matt Wozniak	Denni Neufeld	Winnipeg, Manitoba	6
Jim Cotter (Fourth)	John Morris (Skip)	Tyrel Griffith	Rick Sawatsky	Vernon, British Columbia	11
David Murdoch	Greg Drummond	Scott Andrews	Michael Goodfellow	Stirling, Scotland	9
John Shuster	Tyler George	Matt Hamilton	John Landsteiner	(United States) Duluth, Minnesota	17
Charley Thomas	Nathan Connolly	Brandon Klassen	Craig Savill	Edmonton, Alberta	15

=== Round robin standings ===
Final Round Robin Standings

Key
Teams to Playoffs
Teams to Tiebreakers

Pool A	W	L	PF	PA	SO
(Newfoundland and Labrador) Brad Gushue	4	0	28	17	9
(Ontario) Brad Jacobs	2	2	22	17	4
(Alberta) Brendan Bottcher	2	2	21	17	7
(Ontario) Tanner Horgan	1	3	13	27	12
(Saskatchewan) Steve Laycock	1	3	17	23	13

Pool B	W	L	PF	PA	SO
(British Columbia) John Morris	3	1	27	16	3
(Alberta) Kevin Koe	3	1	20	21	8
(Switzerland) Peter de Cruz	2	2	19	17	10
(Ontario) John Epping	2	2	22	24	11
(Scotland) David Murdoch	0	4	14	24	15

Pool C	W	L	PF	PA	SO
(Manitoba) Reid Carruthers	4	0	26	16	6
(Sweden) Niklas Edin	2	2	22	19	1
(Manitoba) Mike McEwen	2	2	19	18	2
(Alberta) Charley Thomas	2	2	19	19	5
(United States) John Shuster	0	4	11	25	14

=== Round robin results ===
All draw times are listed in Eastern Time (UTC−04:00).

==== Draw 1 ====
Tuesday, December 6, 7:00 pm

Sheet D	1	2	3	4	5	6	7	8	Final
(Newfoundland and Labrador) Brad Gushue	0	3	3	0	0	1	2	X	9
(Ontario) Tanner Horgan 🔨	1	0	0	2	1	0	0	X	4

Sheet E	1	2	3	4	5	6	7	8	Final
(Ontario) Brad Jacobs 🔨	2	0	0	3	2	0	X	X	7
(Alberta) Brendan Bottcher	0	0	1	0	0	1	X	X	2

==== Draw 2 ====
Wednesday, December 7, 8:30 am

Sheet A	1	2	3	4	5	6	7	8	Final
(Scotland) David Murdoch 🔨	0	0	0	1	0	0	X	X	1
(Switzerland) Peter de Cruz	0	2	1	0	2	1	X	X	6

==== Draw 3 ====
Wednesday, December 7, 12:00 pm

Sheet A	1	2	3	4	5	6	7	8	Final
(Manitoba) Reid Carruthers	0	4	1	0	0	1	0	1	7
(United States) John Shuster 🔨	3	0	0	1	0	0	1	0	5

Sheet C	1	2	3	4	5	6	7	8	Final
(Saskatchewan) Steve Laycock 🔨	2	0	1	0	0	1	0	X	4
(Alberta) Brendan Bottcher	0	1	0	2	1	0	3	X	7

==== Draw 4 ====
Wednesday, December 7, 3:30 pm

Sheet A	1	2	3	4	5	6	7	8	Final
(Ontario) John Epping	0	2	0	2	2	1	0	0	7
(British Columbia) John Morris 🔨	1	0	3	0	0	0	1	1	6

Sheet C	1	2	3	4	5	6	7	8	9	Final
(Alberta) Kevin Koe 🔨	2	1	0	0	1	0	0	0	1	5
(Switzerland) Peter de Cruz	0	0	2	1	0	0	0	1	0	4

Sheet D	1	2	3	4	5	6	7	8	Final
(Sweden) Niklas Edin	0	0	1	0	1	2	0	0	4
(Alberta) Charley Thomas 🔨	2	1	0	1	0	0	1	2	7

==== Draw 5 ====
Wednesday, December 7, 7:00 pm

Sheet A	1	2	3	4	5	6	7	8	Final
(Ontario) Brad Jacobs 🔨	0	2	1	0	2	1	0	X	6
(Ontario) Tanner Horgan	1	0	0	1	0	0	1	X	3

Sheet B	1	2	3	4	5	6	7	8	Final
(Newfoundland and Labrador) Brad Gushue	0	1	0	2	1	0	2	X	6
(Saskatchewan) Steve Laycock 🔨	2	0	1	0	0	1	0	X	4

Sheet D	1	2	3	4	5	6	7	8	Final
(Manitoba) Reid Carruthers	0	0	0	2	0	0	4	X	6
(Manitoba) Mike McEwen 🔨	1	0	0	0	2	0	0	X	3

==== Draw 6 ====
Thursday, December 8, 8:30 am

Sheet B	1	2	3	4	5	6	7	8	Final
(Alberta) Brendan Bottcher 🔨	0	0	0	3	5	X	X	X	8
(Ontario) Tanner Horgan	0	0	0	0	0	X	X	X	0

Sheet C	1	2	3	4	5	6	7	8	Final
(Scotland) David Murdoch	0	0	2	0	0	1	0	0	3
(Ontario) John Epping 🔨	1	0	0	1	0	0	2	1	5

Sheet D	1	2	3	4	5	6	7	8	Final
(British Columbia) John Morris	1	2	0	1	1	1	X	X	6
(Switzerland) Peter de Cruz 🔨	0	0	1	0	0	0	X	X	1

Sheet E	1	2	3	4	5	6	7	8	Final
(Manitoba) Mike McEwen 🔨	2	1	0	2	0	0	0	1	6
(Alberta) Charley Thomas	0	0	1	0	2	1	0	0	4

==== Draw 7 ====
Thursday, December 8, 12:00 pm

Sheet C	1	2	3	4	5	6	7	8	Final
(Manitoba) Mike McEwen	0	0	1	0	2	0	1	0	4
(Sweden) Niklas Edin 🔨	0	2	0	1	0	1	0	2	6

==== Draw 8 ====
Thursday, December 8, 3:30 pm

Sheet B	1	2	3	4	5	6	7	8	Final
(Scotland) David Murdoch	0	0	2	0	2	0	2	0	6
(British Columbia) John Morris 🔨	3	0	0	1	0	1	0	2	7

Sheet D	1	2	3	4	5	6	7	8	Final
(Alberta) Kevin Koe 🔨	1	1	0	1	0	1	0	3	7
(Ontario) John Epping	0	0	2	0	1	0	2	0	5

Sheet E	1	2	3	4	5	6	7	8	Final
(Alberta) Charley Thomas 🔨	1	0	0	2	1	0	1	X	5
(United States) John Shuster	0	0	1	0	0	1	0	X	2

==== Draw 9 ====
Thursday, December 8, 7:00 pm

Sheet B	1	2	3	4	5	6	7	8	Final
(Sweden) Niklas Edin 🔨	2	0	1	1	0	0	1	0	5
(Manitoba) Reid Carruthers	0	2	0	0	2	1	0	1	6

Sheet C	1	2	3	4	5	6	7	8	Final
(Ontario) Brad Jacobs	0	1	0	2	0	2	0	X	5
(Newfoundland and Labrador) Brad Gushue 🔨	1	0	2	0	2	0	2	X	7

Sheet E	1	2	3	4	5	6	7	8	9	Final
(Ontario) Tanner Horgan	0	0	1	0	1	0	0	2	2	6
(Saskatchewan) Steve Laycock 🔨	0	0	0	1	0	0	3	0	0	4

==== Draw 10 ====
Friday, December 9, 8:30 am

Sheet D	1	2	3	4	5	6	7	8	Final
(Manitoba) Mike McEwen 🔨	0	0	1	0	0	4	1	X	6
(United States) John Shuster	0	0	0	2	0	0	0	X	2

Sheet E	1	2	3	4	5	6	7	8	Final
(Scotland) David Murdoch 🔨	0	1	0	1	0	1	0	1	4
(Alberta) Kevin Koe	1	0	2	0	2	0	1	0	6

==== Draw 11 ====
Friday, December 9, 12:00 pm

Sheet D	1	2	3	4	5	6	7	8	9	Final
(Newfoundland and Labrador) Brad Gushue 🔨	0	1	0	2	0	0	0	1	2	6
(Alberta) Brendan Bottcher	0	0	2	0	0	1	1	0	0	4

==== Draw 12 ====
Friday, December 9, 3:30 pm

Sheet A	1	2	3	4	5	6	7	8	Final
(Manitoba) Reid Carruthers	1	2	0	0	1	0	3	X	7
(Alberta) Charley Thomas 🔨	0	0	0	2	0	1	0	X	3

Sheet B	1	2	3	4	5	6	7	8	9	Final
(Ontario) John Epping	1	0	3	0	1	0	0	0	0	5
(Switzerland) Peter de Cruz 🔨	0	1	0	2	0	0	2	0	3	8

Sheet C	1	2	3	4	5	6	7	8	Final
(British Columbia) John Morris 🔨	2	0	1	2	2	1	X	X	8
(Alberta) Kevin Koe	0	2	0	0	0	0	X	X	2

Sheet D	1	2	3	4	5	6	7	8	Final
(Ontario) Brad Jacobs 🔨	1	0	0	2	0	1	0	0	4
(Saskatchewan) Steve Laycock	0	1	0	0	2	0	1	1	5

Sheet E	1	2	3	4	5	6	7	8	Final
(Sweden) Niklas Edin 🔨	2	0	2	0	0	3	X	X	7
(United States) John Shuster	0	1	0	1	0	0	X	X	2

=== Tiebreakers ===
Team	1	2	3	4	5	6	7	8	Final
(Manitoba) Mike McEwen 🔨	1	0	1	0	2	0	2	0	6
(Ontario) John Epping	0	1	0	2	0	1	0	3	7

Player percentages
(Manitoba) Team McEwen		(Ontario) Team Epping	
Denni Neufeld	82%	Tim March	92%
Matt Wozniak	86%	Pat Janssen	88%
B. J. Neufeld	82%	Mat Camm	88%
Mike McEwen	86%	John Epping	90%
Total	84%	Total	90%

Team	1	2	3	4	5	6	7	8	Final
(Ontario) Brad Jacobs 🔨	1	0	1	0	0	0	0	1	3
(Switzerland) Peter de Cruz	0	1	0	0	0	1	0	0	2

Player percentages
(Ontario) Team Jacobs		(Switzerland) Team de Cruz	
Ryan Harnden	92%	Valentin Tanner	95%
E. J. Harnden	82%	Peter de Cruz	85%
Ryan Fry	85%	Claudio Pätz	93%
Brad Jacobs	98%	Benoît Schwarz	83%
Total	89%	Total	89%

Team	1	2	3	4	5	6	7	8	Final
(Alberta) Charley Thomas	0	1	3	0	1	0	0	2	7
(Alberta) Brendan Bottcher 🔨	2	0	0	1	0	0	1	0	4

Player percentages
(Alberta) Team Thomas		(Alberta) Team Bottcher	
Craig Savill	84%	Karrick Martin	88%
Brandon Klassen	78%	Brad Thiessen	80%
Nathan Connolly	81%	Pat Simmons	57%
Charley Thomas	84%	Brendan Bottcher	76%
Total	82%	Total	75%

=== Playoffs ===
Quarterfinals
1	(Manitoba) Reid Carruthers	7
8	(Ontario) John Epping	3
4	(Alberta) Kevin Koe	5
5	(Sweden) Niklas Edin	6
2	(Newfoundland and Labrador) Brad Gushue	4
7	(Alberta) Charley Thomas	3
3	(British Columbia) John Morris	5
6	(Ontario) Brad Jacobs	6

Semifinals
1	(Manitoba) Reid Carruthers	7
5	(Sweden) Niklas Edin	0
2	(Newfoundland and Labrador) Brad Gushue	3
6	(Ontario) Brad Jacobs	5

Final
1	(Manitoba) Reid Carruthers	2
6	(Ontario) Brad Jacobs	4

==== Quarterfinals ====
Team	1	2	3	4	5	6	7	8	Final
(Manitoba) Reid Carruthers 🔨	0	0	2	1	1	0	3	X	7
(Ontario) John Epping	1	1	0	0	0	1	0	X	3

Player percentages
(Manitoba) Team Carruthers		(Ontario) Team Epping	
Colin Hodgson	90%	Tim March	79%
Derek Samagalski	92%	Pat Janssen	86%
Braeden Moskowy	86%	Mat Camm	92%
Reid Carruthers	79%	John Epping	70%
Total	87%	Total	82%

Team	1	2	3	4	5	6	7	8	9	Final
(Alberta) Kevin Koe 🔨	1	0	0	2	0	1	1	0	0	5
(Sweden) Niklas Edin	0	0	3	0	2	0	0	0	1	6

Player percentages
(Alberta) Team Koe		(Sweden) Team Edin	
Ben Hebert	95%	Christoffer Sundgren	85%
Brent Laing	82%	Rasmus Wranå	95%
Marc Kennedy	92%	Oskar Eriksson	97%
Kevin Koe	79%	Niklas Edin	82%
Total	87%	Total	90%

Team	1	2	3	4	5	6	7	8	9	Final
(Newfoundland and Labrador) Brad Gushue 🔨	0	1	0	2	0	0	0	0	1	4
(Alberta) Charley Thomas	0	0	1	0	1	0	0	1	0	3

Player percentages
(Newfoundland and Labrador) Team Gushue		(Alberta) Team Thomas	
Geoff Walker	79%	Craig Savill	87%
Brett Gallant	91%	Brandon Klassen	68%
Mark Nichols	92%	Nathan Connolly	80%
Brad Gushue	80%	Charley Thomas	89%
Total	85%	Total	81%

Team	1	2	3	4	5	6	7	8	Final
(British Columbia) John Morris 🔨	1	0	2	0	1	0	1	0	5
(Ontario) Brad Jacobs	0	1	0	1	0	1	0	3	6

Player percentages
(British Columbia) Team Morris		(Ontario) Team Jacobs	
Rick Sawatsky	86%	Ryan Harnden	99%
Tyrel Griffith	90%	E. J. Harnden	86%
John Morris	87%	Ryan Fry	83%
Jim Cotter	86%	Brad Jacobs	84%
Total	87%	Total	88%

==== Semifinals ====
Team	1	2	3	4	5	6	7	8	Final
(Manitoba) Reid Carruthers 🔨	1	1	2	1	2	X	X	X	7
(Sweden) Niklas Edin	0	0	0	0	0	X	X	X	0

Player percentages
(Manitoba) Team Carruthers		(Sweden) Team Edin	
Colin Hodgson	91%	Christoffer Sundgren	94%
Derek Samagalski	85%	Rasmus Wranå	52%
Braeden Moskowy	98%	Oskar Eriksson	93%
Reid Carruthers	88%	Niklas Edin	53%
Total	91%	Total	73%

Team	1	2	3	4	5	6	7	8	Final
(Newfoundland and Labrador) Brad Gushue 🔨	0	0	2	0	0	1	0	0	3
(Ontario) Brad Jacobs	0	1	0	1	0	0	0	3	5

Player percentages
(Newfoundland and Labrador) Team Gushue		(Ontario) Team Jacobs	
Geoff Walker	85%	Ryan Harnden	92%
Brett Gallant	87%	E. J. Harnden	85%
Mark Nichols	92%	Ryan Fry	86%
Brad Gushue	82%	Brad Jacobs	89%
Total	87%	Total	88%

==== Final ====
Sheet C	1	2	3	4	5	6	7	8	Final
(Manitoba) Reid Carruthers 🔨	1	0	0	1	0	0	0	0	2
(Ontario) Brad Jacobs	0	0	1	0	1	1	0	1	4

Player percentages
(Manitoba) Team Carruthers		(Ontario) Team Jacobs	
Colin Hodgson	87%	Ryan Harnden	97%
Derek Samagalski	95%	E. J. Harnden	91%
Braeden Moskowy	75%	Ryan Fry	88%
Reid Carruthers	80%	Brad Jacobs	85%
Total	84%	Total	90%

== Women ==
=== Teams ===
The teams are listed as follows:

Skip	Third	Second	Lead	Locale	OOM rank
Chelsea Carey	Susan O'Connor	Jocelyn Peterman	Laine Peters	Calgary, Alberta	9
Kerri Einarson	Selena Kaatz	Liz Fyfe	Kristin MacCuish	Winnipeg, Manitoba	13
Binia Feltscher	Irene Schori	Franziska Kaufmann	Christine Urech	Flims, Switzerland	15
Allison Flaxey	Clancy Grandy	Lynn Kreviazuk	Morgan Court	Caledon, Ontario	6
Tracy Fleury	Jennifer Wylie	Crystal Webster	Amanda Gates	Sudbury, Ontario	10
Anna Hasselborg	Sara McManus	Agnes Knochenhauer	Sofia Mabergs	Sundbyberg, Sweden	7
Rachel Homan	Emma Miskew	Joanne Courtney	Lisa Weagle	Ottawa, Ontario	1
Jennifer Jones	Kaitlyn Lawes	Jill Officer	Dawn McEwen	Winnipeg, Manitoba	2
Kim Eun-jung	Kim Kyeong-ae	Kim Seon-yeong	Kim Yeong-mi	Uiseong, South Korea	11
Krista McCarville	Kendra Lilly	Ashley Sippala	Sarah Potts	Thunder Bay, Ontario	20
Eve Muirhead	Anna Sloan	Vicki Adams	Lauren Gray	Perth, Scotland	5
Kelsey Rocque	Laura Crocker	Taylor McDonald	Jen Gates	Edmonton, Alberta	8
Anna Sidorova	Alexandra Raeva	Margarita Fomina	Nkeirouka Ezekh	Moscow, Russia	12
Val Sweeting	Lori Olson-Johns	Dana Ferguson	Rachelle Brown	Edmonton, Alberta	4
Silvana Tirinzoni	Cathy Overton-Clapham	Esther Neuenschwander	Marlene Albrecht	Zürich, Switzerland	3

=== Round robin standings ===
Final Round Robin Standings

Key
Teams to Playoffs
Teams to Tiebreakers

Pool A	W	L	PF	PA	SO
(Ontario) Rachel Homan	3	1	30	13	3
(Ontario) Krista McCarville	3	1	24	17	9
(Alberta) Chelsea Carey	2	2	21	23	10
(Ontario) Allison Flaxey	1	3	14	30	4
(Ontario) Tracy Fleury	1	3	19	25	12

Pool B	W	L	PF	PA	SO
(Alberta) Val Sweeting	4	0	25	16	5
(Sweden) Anna Hasselborg	2	2	19	15	2
(Manitoba) Jennifer Jones	2	2	20	22	8
(Switzerland) Binia Feltscher	2	2	22	22	11
(South Korea) Kim Eun-jung	0	4	12	23	15

Pool C	W	L	PF	PA	SO
(Switzerland) Silvana Tirinzoni	3	1	26	12	1
(Manitoba) Kerri Einarson	3	1	21	20	6
(Russia) Anna Sidorova	3	1	21	18	7
(Scotland) Eve Muirhead	1	3	19	20	13
(Alberta) Kelsey Rocque	0	4	13	30	14

=== Round robin results ===
All draw times are listed in Eastern Time (UTC−04:00).

==== Draw 1 ====
Tuesday, December 6, 7:00 pm

Sheet A	1	2	3	4	5	6	7	8	Final
(Scotland) Eve Muirhead 🔨	0	0	1	0	1	2	0	1	5
(Russia) Anna Sidorova	1	1	0	3	0	0	1	0	6

Sheet B	1	2	3	4	5	6	7	8	9	Final
(Alberta) Val Sweeting 🔨	0	2	0	1	1	0	2	0	2	8
(Switzerland) Binia Feltscher	2	0	1	0	0	1	0	2	0	6

==== Draw 2 ====
Wednesday, December 7, 8:30 am

Sheet B	1	2	3	4	5	6	7	8	Final
(Sweden) Anna Hasselborg 🔨	1	0	0	2	2	0	0	X	5
(South Korea) Kim Eun-jung	0	1	0	0	0	0	1	X	2

Sheet C	1	2	3	4	5	6	7	8	Final
(Switzerland) Silvana Tirinzoni 🔨	2	1	3	0	1	X	X	X	7
(Manitoba) Kerri Einarson	0	0	0	1	0	X	X	X	1

Sheet D	1	2	3	4	5	6	7	8	Final
(Ontario) Rachel Homan 🔨	3	0	0	2	0	3	X	X	8
(Alberta) Chelsea Carey	0	0	1	0	2	0	X	X	3

==== Draw 3 ====
Wednesday, December 7, 12:00 pm

Sheet B	1	2	3	4	5	6	7	8	Final
(Alberta) Kelsey Rocque 🔨	0	1	0	0	2	0	0	X	3
(Scotland) Eve Muirhead	1	0	3	2	0	1	1	X	8

Sheet D	1	2	3	4	5	6	7	8	Final
(Manitoba) Jennifer Jones	0	0	1	1	0	1	X	X	3
(Switzerland) Binia Feltscher 🔨	3	1	0	0	4	0	X	X	8

Sheet E	1	2	3	4	5	6	7	8	Final
(Ontario) Allison Flaxey 🔨	0	1	0	3	0	1	0	1	6
(Ontario) Tracy Fleury	1	0	2	0	0	0	2	0	5

==== Draw 4 ====
Wednesday, December 7, 3:30 pm

Sheet B	1	2	3	4	5	6	7	8	Final
(Switzerland) Silvana Tirinzoni 🔨	0	0	1	0	1	0	2	1	5
(Russia) Anna Sidorova	0	3	0	2	0	1	0	0	6

Sheet E	1	2	3	4	5	6	7	8	Final
(Ontario) Rachel Homan 🔨	1	0	1	1	0	3	2	X	8
(Ontario) Krista McCarville	0	0	0	0	2	0	0	X	2

==== Draw 5 ====
Wednesday, December 7, 7:00 pm

Sheet C	1	2	3	4	5	6	7	8	Final
(Alberta) Val Sweeting 🔨	1	0	0	1	2	1	1	X	6
(South Korea) Kim Eun-jung	0	2	0	0	0	0	0	X	2

Sheet E	1	2	3	4	5	6	7	8	Final
(Manitoba) Jennifer Jones	1	1	0	0	0	0	4	0	6
(Sweden) Anna Hasselborg 🔨	0	0	0	2	1	0	0	2	5

==== Draw 6 ====
Thursday, December 8, 8:30 am

Sheet A	1	2	3	4	5	6	7	8	Final
(Ontario) Krista McCarville 🔨	1	1	0	3	3	0	X	X	8
(Ontario) Allison Flaxey	0	0	2	0	0	1	X	X	3

==== Draw 7 ====
Thursday, December 8, 12:00 pm

Sheet A	1	2	3	4	5	6	7	8	Final
(Ontario) Tracy Fleury	0	0	2	0	2	0	1	0	5
(Alberta) Chelsea Carey 🔨	0	3	0	1	0	2	0	2	8

Sheet B	1	2	3	4	5	6	7	8	Final
(Switzerland) Binia Feltscher	2	1	0	1	0	1	0	1	6
(South Korea) Kim Eun-jung 🔨	0	0	1	0	2	0	2	0	5

Sheet D	1	2	3	4	5	6	7	8	Final
(Switzerland) Silvana Tirinzoni 🔨	0	1	0	2	0	1	1	3	8
(Alberta) Kelsey Rocque	0	0	1	0	1	0	0	0	2

Sheet E	1	2	3	4	5	6	7	8	9	Final
(Manitoba) Kerri Einarson 🔨	0	2	0	0	0	2	0	0	2	6
(Russia) Anna Sidorova	0	0	0	1	1	0	0	2	0	4

==== Draw 8 ====
Thursday, December 8, 3:30 pm

Sheet A	1	2	3	4	5	6	7	8	Final
(Alberta) Val Sweeting	0	0	3	0	0	1	0	1	5
(Sweden) Anna Hasselborg 🔨	0	1	0	1	0	0	1	0	3

Sheet C	1	2	3	4	5	6	7	8	Final
(Ontario) Rachel Homan 🔨	2	0	2	0	3	3	X	X	10
(Ontario) Allison Flaxey	0	1	0	1	0	0	X	X	2

==== Draw 9 ====
Thursday, December 8, 7:00 pm

Sheet A	1	2	3	4	5	6	7	8	Final
(Manitoba) Jennifer Jones 🔨	0	1	2	1	0	1	0	1	6
(South Korea) Kim Kyeong-ae	0	0	0	0	1	0	2	0	3

Sheet D	1	2	3	4	5	6	7	8	Final
(Manitoba) Kerri Einarson	1	0	0	1	2	0	0	1	5
(Scotland) Eve Muirhead 🔨	0	1	1	0	0	1	0	0	3

==== Draw 10 ====
Friday, December 9, 8:30 am

Sheet B	1	2	3	4	5	6	7	8	Final
(Alberta) Chelsea Carey 🔨	0	0	1	0	2	0	0	X	3
(Ontario) Krista McCarville	1	2	0	2	0	1	1	X	7

Sheet C	1	2	3	4	5	6	7	8	Final
(Sweden) Anna Hasselborg 🔨	2	0	0	0	1	0	3	X	6
(Switzerland) Binia Feltscher	0	0	1	0	0	1	0	X	2

==== Draw 11 ====
Friday, December 9, 12:00 pm

Sheet A	1	2	3	4	5	6	7	8	Final
(Alberta) Kelsey Rocque 🔨	0	2	0	1	0	3	0	X	6
(Manitoba) Kerri Einarson	0	0	1	0	2	0	6	X	9

Sheet B	1	2	3	4	5	6	7	8	Final
(Ontario) Rachel Homan 🔨	2	0	0	1	0	0	1	0	4
(Ontario) Tracy Fleury	0	0	1	0	1	1	0	3	6

Sheet C	1	2	3	4	5	6	7	8	9	Final
(Manitoba) Jennifer Jones 🔨	3	0	0	1	0	0	1	0	0	5
(Alberta) Val Sweeting	0	2	0	0	0	1	0	2	1	6

Sheet E	1	2	3	4	5	6	7	8	Final
(Scotland) Eve Muirhead	0	0	1	0	0	2	0	X	3
(Switzerland) Silvana Tirinzoni 🔨	0	0	0	3	1	0	2	X	6

==== Draw 13 ====
Friday, December 9, 7:00 pm

Sheet A	1	2	3	4	5	6	7	8	Final
(Alberta) Chelsea Carey	1	0	2	1	0	1	2	X	7
(Ontario) Allison Flaxey 🔨	0	1	0	0	2	0	0	X	3

Sheet C	1	2	3	4	5	6	7	8	Final
(Ontario) Tracy Fleury	0	0	1	0	2	0	0	X	3
(Ontario) Krista McCarville 🔨	0	3	0	2	0	1	1	X	7

Sheet D	1	2	3	4	5	6	7	8	Final
(Alberta) Kelsey Rocque	0	0	0	1	1	0	0	X	2
(Russia) Anna Sidorova 🔨	1	0	1	0	0	2	1	X	5

=== Tiebreakers ===
Team	1	2	3	4	5	6	7	8	Final
(Sweden) Anna Hasselborg 🔨	2	0	0	0	0	1	0	0	3
(Switzerland) Binia Feltscher	0	2	0	1	0	0	1	1	5

Player percentages
(Sweden) Team Hasselborg		(Switzerland) Team Feltscher	
Sofia Mabergs	76%	Christine Urech	68%
Agnes Knochenhauer	82%	Franziska Kaufmann	80%
Sara McManus	85%	Irene Schori	71%
Anna Hasselborg	71%	Binia Feltscher	94%
Total	78%	Total	78%

Team	1	2	3	4	5	6	7	8	Final
(Manitoba) Jennifer Jones	0	2	2	0	2	1	0	0	7
(Alberta) Chelsea Carey 🔨	2	0	0	3	0	0	1	2	8

Player percentages
(Manitoba) Team Jones		(Alberta) Team Carey	
Dawn McEwen	90%	Laine Peters	85%
Jill Officer	86%	Jocelyn Peterman	84%
Kaitlyn Lawes	64%	Susan O'Connor	81%
Jennifer Jones	87%	Chelsea Carey	77%
Total	82%	Total	82%

=== Playoffs ===
Quarterfinals
1	(Alberta) Val Sweeting	2
8	(Switzerland) Binia Feltscher	8
4	(Manitoba) Kerri Einarson	8
5	(Russia) Anna Sidorova	7
2	(Switzerland) Silvana Tirinzoni	9
7	(Alberta) Chelsea Carey	2
3	(Ontario) Rachel Homan	5
6	(Ontario) Krista McCarville	8

Semifinals
8	(Switzerland) Binia Feltscher	6
4	(Manitoba) Kerri Einarson	9
2	(Switzerland) Silvana Tirinzoni	6
6	(Ontario) Krista McCarville	5

Final
4	(Manitoba) Kerri Einarson	5
2	(Switzerland) Silvana Tirinzoni	3

==== Quarterfinals ====
Team	1	2	3	4	5	6	7	8	Final
(Alberta) Val Sweeting 🔨	0	1	0	1	0	0	X	X	2
(Switzerland) Binia Feltscher	0	0	3	0	3	2	X	X	8

Player percentages
(Alberta) Team Sweeting		(Switzerland) Team Feltscher	
Rachelle Brown	75%	Christine Urech	86%
Dana Ferguson	57%	Franziska Kaufmann	90%
Lori Olson-Johns	44%	Irene Schori	84%
Val Sweeting	55%	Binia Feltscher	94%
Total	58%	Total	89%

Team	1	2	3	4	5	6	7	8	Final
(Manitoba) Kerri Einarson	0	1	2	0	0	3	0	2	8
(Russia) Anna Sidorova 🔨	2	0	0	1	2	0	2	0	7

Player percentages
(Manitoba) Team Einarson		(Russia) Team Sidorova	
Kristin MacCuish	78%	Nkeiruka Ezekh	71%
Liz Fyfe	72%	Margarita Fomina	77%
Selena Kaatz	75%	Alexandra Raeva	75%
Kerri Einarson	69%	Anna Sidorova	53%
Total	73%	Total	69%

Team	1	2	3	4	5	6	7	8	Final
(Switzerland) Silvana Tirinzoni 🔨	2	0	2	0	1	4	X	X	9
(Alberta) Chelsea Carey	0	1	0	1	0	0	X	X	2

Player percentages
(Switzerland) Team Tirinzoni		(Alberta) Team Carey	
Marlene Albrecht	77%	Laine Peters	91%
Esther Neuenschwander	79%	Jocelyn Peterman	77%
Cathy Overton-Clapham	85%	Susan O'Connor	65%
Silvana Tirinzoni	72%	Chelsea Carey	64%
Total	78%	Total	75%

Team	1	2	3	4	5	6	7	8	Final
(Ontario) Rachel Homan	0	0	1	0	3	1	0	X	5
(Ontario) Krista McCarville 🔨	2	1	0	2	0	0	3	X	8

Player percentages
(Ontario) Team Homan		(Ontario) Team McCarville	
Lisa Weagle	90%	Sarah Potts	87%
Joanne Courtney	86%	Ashley Sippala	82%
Emma Miskew	75%	Kendra Lilly	92%
Rachel Homan	91%	Krista McCarville	95%
Total	86%	Total	88%

==== Semifinals ====
Team	1	2	3	4	5	6	7	8	Final
(Switzerland) Binia Feltscher	0	2	0	1	0	2	1	0	6
(Manitoba) Kerri Einarson 🔨	2	0	4	0	2	0	0	1	9

Player percentages
(Switzerland) Team Feltscher		(Manitoba) Team Einarson	
Christine Urech	96%	Kristin MacCuish	51%
Franziska Kaufmann	39%	Liz Fyfe	83%
Irene Schori	66%	Selena Kaatz	81%
Binia Feltscher	73%	Kerri Einarson	82%
Total	68%	Total	75%

Team	1	2	3	4	5	6	7	8	Final
(Switzerland) Silvana Tirinzoni 🔨	0	1	0	1	0	0	2	2	6
(Ontario) Krista McCarville	0	0	1	0	2	2	0	0	5

Player percentages
(Switzerland) Team Tirinzoni		(Ontario) Team McCarville	
Marlene Albrecht	85%	Sarah Potts	85%
Esther Neuenschwander	84%	Ashley Sippala	81%
Cathy Overton-Clapham	74%	Kendra Lilly	79%
Silvana Tirinzoni	78%	Krista McCarville	77%
Total	80%	Total	81%

==== Final ====
Sheet C	1	2	3	4	5	6	7	8	Final
(Manitoba) Kerri Einarson	0	1	0	1	1	0	2	X	5
(Switzerland) Silvana Tirinzoni 🔨	0	0	2	0	0	1	0	X	3

Player percentages
(Manitoba) Team Einarson		(Switzerland) Team Tirinzoni	
Kristin MacCuish	61%	Marlene Albrecht	82%
Liz Fyfe	69%	Esther Neuenschwander	86%
Selena Kaatz	83%	Cathy Overton-Clapham	78%
Kerri Einarson	84%	Silvana Tirinzoni	69%
Total	74%	Total	79%
