= 2016 Manitoba Scotties Tournament of Hearts =

Curling tournament

- Host city: Beausejour, Manitoba
- Arena: Sun Gro Centre
- Dates: January 20–24
- Winner: Team Einarson
- Curling club: East St. Paul CC, East St. Paul
- Skip: Kerri Einarson
- Third: Selena Kaatz
- Second: Liz Fyfe
- Lead: Kristin MacCuish
- Alternate: Cherie-Ann Sheppard
- Finalist: Kristy McDonald

The 2016 Manitoba Scotties Tournament of Hearts, the provincial women's curling championship of Manitoba, was held from January 20 to 24 at the Sun Gro Centre in Beausejour. The winning Kerri Einarson team represented Manitoba at the 2016 Scotties Tournament of Hearts in Grande Prairie, Alberta.

== Teams ==
The teams are listed as follows:

Skip	Third	Second	Lead	Alternate	Club(s)
Shannon Birchard	Nicole Sigvaldason	Sheyna Andries	Maria Mondor	Beth Peterson	St. Vital Curling Club, Winnipeg
Joelle Brown	Alyssa Vandepoele	Erika Sigurdson	Lindsay Baldock	Heather Maxted	Assiniboine Memorial Curling Club, Winnipeg
Kerri Einarson	Selena Kaatz	Liz Fyfe	Kristin MacCuish	Cherie-Ann Sheppard	East St. Paul Curling Club, East St. Paul
Janet Harvey	Susan Baleja	Robin Campbell	Carey Kirby	Janice Blair	Granite Curling Club, Winnipeg
Kim Link	Colleen Kilgallen	Angela Wickman	Renee Fletcher	Karen Fallis	East St. Paul Curling Club, East St. Paul
Christina MacKay	Gaetanne Gauthier	Taylor Maida	Katrina Thiessen		Fort Rouge Curling Club, Winnipeg
Kristy McDonald	Kate Cameron	Leslie Wilson-Westcott	Raunora Westcott	Lindsay Warkentin	Granite Curling Club, Winnipeg
Lisa Menard	Sam Murata	Lesle Cafferty	Laurie Macdonell	Brandi Oliver	Dauphin Curling Club, Dauphin
Michelle Wiens (Montford)	Lisa DeRiviere	Sara Van Walleghem	Sarah Neufeld	Sara Van Welleghem	Assiniboine Memorial Curling Club, Winnipeg
Cathy Overton-Clapham	Briane Meilleur	Katherine Doerksen	Krysten Karwacki		Fort Rouge Curling Club, Winnipeg
Cheryl Reed	Stacey Fordyce	Pam Robins	Roz Taylor		Brandon Curling Club, Brandon
Darcy Robertson	Karen Klein	Vanessa Foster	Michelle Kruk	Rachel Burtynk	Rossmere Golf and Country Club, Winnipeg
Jennifer Rolles	Sheri Horning	Courtney Reeves	Carly Perras		Burntwood Curling Club, Thompson
Barb Spencer	Katie Spencer	Holly Spencer	Sydney Arnal	Allyson Spencer	Assiniboine Memorial Curling Club, Winnipeg
Terry Ursel	Gwen Wooley	Tracy Igonia	Wanda Rainka	Tina Kozak	Neepawa Curling Club, Neepawa
Mackenzie Zacharias	Morgan Reimer	Emily Zacharias	Jenessa Rutter		Altona Curling Club, Altona

== Round-robin standings ==
Key
Teams to Playoffs
Teams to Tiebreaker

Black Group	W	L
McDonald	6	1
Birchard	6	1
Brown	5	2
Montford	4	3
MacKay	4	3
Link	1	5
Zacharias	1	5
Ursel	1	5

Red Group	W	L
Einarson	6	1
Overton-Clapham	6	1
Menard	5	2
Spencer	3	4
Robertson	3	4
Reed	3	4
Harvey	1	6
Rolles	1	6

== Round-robin results ==
=== January 20 ===
Draw 1

- Brown 5-4 Link
- McDonald 11-3 Ursel
- Montford 7-6 MacKay
- Birchard 6-3 Zacharias

Draw 2

- Overton-Clapham 10-4 Rolles
- Menard 9-7 Spencer
- Reed 11-10 Einarson
- Robertson 12-3 Harvey

Draw 3

- McDonald 8-4 MacKay
- Birchard 7-5 Link
- Brown 5-4 Zacharias
- Montford 8-5 Ursel

Draw 4

- Einarson 8-3 Menard
- Overton-Clapham 9-5 Harvey
- Robertson 10-4 Rolles
- Spencer 9-6 Reed

=== January 21 ===
Draw 5

- Montford 8-4 Link
- Brown 8-5 Ursel
- Birchard 8-3 MacKay
- McDonald 8-3 Zacharias

Draw 6

- Spencer 9-8 Harvey
- Robertson 10-6 Reed
- Overton-Clapham 6-3 Menard
- Einarson 7-1 Rolles

Draw 7

- Birchard 9-1 Ursel
- McDonald 9-5 Link
- Montford 10-3 Zacharias
- MacKay 7-5 Brown

Draw 8

- Overton-Clapham 9-3 Reed
- Einarson 8-1 Harvey
- Rolles 6-5 Spencer
- Menard 7-5 Robertson

=== January 22 ===
Draw 9

- Spencer 9-2 Robertson
- Menard 10-6 Rolles
- Reed 8-4 Harvey
- Einarson 8-5 Overton-Clapham

Draw 10

- Brown 12-7 Montford
- MacKay 7-4 Zacharias
- Link 10-2 Ursel
- McDonald 9-4 Birchard

Draw 11

- Menard 7-6 Reed
- Overton-Clapham 6-4 Robertson
- Einarson 12-2 Spencer
- Harvey 8-5 Rolles

Draw 12

- MacKay 8-4 Ursel
- Birchard 8-3 Brown vs.
- McDonald 6-4 Montford
- Zacharias 10-3 Link

=== January 23 ===
Draw 13

- Einarson 9-5 Robertson
- Reed 9-6 Rolles
- Menard 7-6 Harvey
- Overton-Clapham 5-4 Spencer

Draw 14

- Brown 9-5 McDonald
- Ursel 9-3 Zacharias
- MacKay 7-2 Link
- Birchard 6-5 Montford

== Playoffs ==
Page playoff system
R1	Kristy McDonald	7
B1	Kerri Einarson	5
R2	Shannon Birchard	7
B2	Cathy Overton-Clapham	3

Semifinal
B1	Kerri Einarson	8
R2	Shannon Birchard	3

Final
R1	Kristy McDonald	5
B1	Kerri Einarson	7

=== R1 vs B1 ===
Saturday, January 23, 6:00 pm

Team	1	2	3	4	5	6	7	8	9	10	Final
Kristy McDonald	1	0	0	0	0	1	0	4	0	1	7
Kerri Einarson	0	0	0	0	3	0	1	0	1	0	5

=== R2 vs B2 ===
Saturday, January 23, 6:00 pm

Team	1	2	3	4	5	6	7	8	9	10	Final
Shannon Birchard	1	0	0	2	1	0	1	0	2	X	7
Cathy Overton-Clapham	0	0	1	0	0	1	0	1	0	X	3

=== Semifinal ===
Sunday, January 24, 9:00 am

Team	1	2	3	4	5	6	7	8	9	10	Final
Kerri Einarson	2	1	0	1	0	1	3	0	X	X	8
Shannon Birchard	0	0	1	0	1	0	0	1	X	X	3

=== Final ===
Sunday, January 24, 1:30 pm

Team	1	2	3	4	5	6	7	8	9	10	Final
Kristy McDonald	0	2	0	0	2	0	0	0	0	1	5
Kerri Einarson	0	0	0	2	0	0	0	2	3	0	7

2016 Manitoba Scotties Tournament of Hearts

Kerri Einarson
1st Manitoba Provincial Championship title
