= Kerri Einarson =

Canadian curler (born 1987)

- Curler
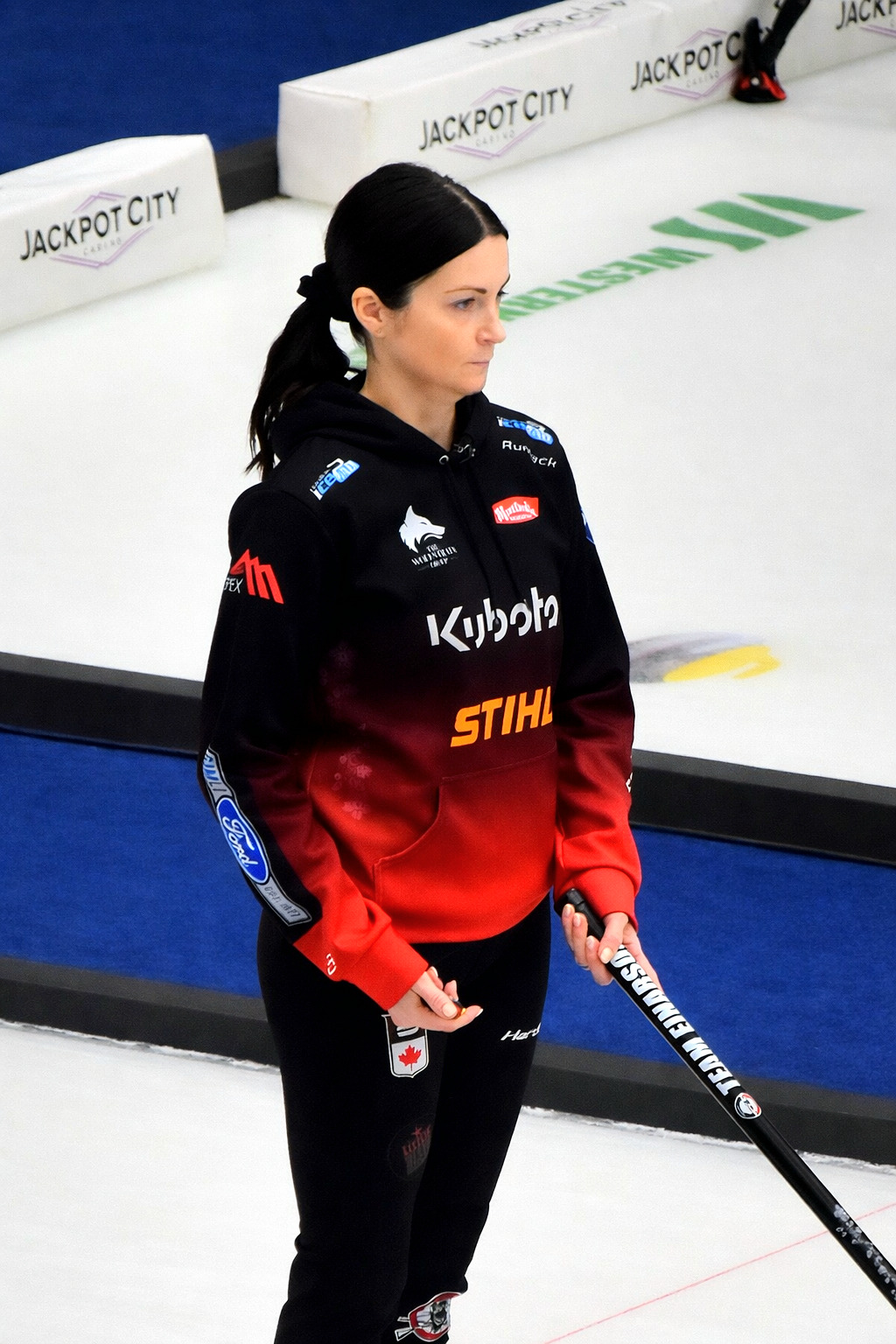
- Einarson at the 2026 Players' Championship
- Born: Kerri Flett; October 3, 1987 (age 39); Selkirk, Manitoba, Canada

Team
- Curling club: Gimli CC, Gimli, MB
- Skip: Kerri Einarson
- Third: Shannon Birchard
- Second: Karlee Burgess
- Lead: Jocelyn Peterman

Curling career
- Member Association: Manitoba
- Hearts: 9 (2016, 2018, 2020, 2021, 2022, 2023, 2024, 2025, 2026)
- World Championship: 4 (2021, 2022, 2023, 2026)
- World Mixed Doubles Championship: 1 (2021)
- Pan Continental Championship: 2 (2022, 2023)
- Top CTRS ranking: 1st (2019–20, 2022–23)
- Grand Slam victories: 7 (2016 National, 2019 Players', 2021 Players', 2022 Champions Cup, 2022 Masters, 2024 Tour Challenge, 2026 Invitational)
Medal record
Women's curling
Representing Canada
World Championships
Silver medal – second place	2026 Calgary
Bronze medal – third place	2022 Prince George
Bronze medal – third place	2023 Sandviken
Pan Continental Championships
Bronze medal – third place	2022 Calgary
Scotties Tournament of Hearts
Gold medal – first place	2021 Calgary
Gold medal – first place	2022 Thunder Bay
Gold medal – first place	2023 Kamloops
Gold medal – first place	2026 Mississauga
Representing Manitoba
Scotties Tournament of Hearts
Gold medal – first place	2020 Moose Jaw
Silver medal – second place	2025 Thunder Bay
Canadian Olympic Curling Trials
Bronze medal – third place	2025 Halifax
Canadian Mixed Doubles Championships
Gold medal – first place	2021 Calgary
Representing (Manitoba) Team Wild Card
Scotties Tournament of Hearts
Silver medal – second place	2018 Penticton

Kerri Einarson (/ˈeɪnərsən/; born Kerri Flett; October 3, 1987) is a Canadian Métis curler from Camp Morton, Manitoba, in the Rural Municipality of Gimli. Einarson is a five-time women's national champion in curling, skipping her team to victory in the 2020, 2021, 2022, 2023, and 2026 Scotties Tournament of Hearts. She also took the silver medal in 2018 and 2025. Einarson has won seven Grand Slam of Curling events: the 2016 Boost National, 2019 Players' Championship, 2021 Players' Championship, 2022 Champions Cup, 2022 Masters, 2024 Tour Challenge and 2026 Invitational.

== Career ==
Einarson won her first provincial mixed title in 2010, playing third for Dave Boehmer. The team represented Manitoba at the 2010 Canadian Mixed Curling Championship, where they lost in the tiebreaker match. At the 2013 provincial mixed (played in 2012), Einarson played third for Terry McNamee and won her second provincial mixed title. This team played in the 2013 Canadian Mixed Curling Championship, finishing with a 4–7 record.

Einarson has skipped her own team on the women's World Curling Tour since 2008, except for one season playing third for Jill Thurston in the 2011–12 season. The following season, she finished second at the 2012 Atkins Curling Supplies Women's Classic.

Einarson scored a rare eight-ender in her first round robin game of the 2015 Manitoba Scotties Tournament of Hearts against Tiffany McLean. It was the first time a team scored an eight-ender in recorded Manitoba Scotties history.

Einarson's first Tour event win as a skip was at the 2015 GSOC Tour Challenge, where she finished first in the tier 2 event and won a spot at the 2015 The Masters Grand Slam of Curling where she would lose to Val Sweeting in the semifinals. Einarson would make it to two more semifinals at Grand Slams that season. That year Einarson would also win her first provincial championship, qualifying her team of Selena Kaatz, Liz Fyfe and Kristin MacCuish to represent Manitoba at the 2016 Scotties Tournament of Hearts. There, she led her province to a 7–4 round robin record, qualifying the team to the playoffs. In the playoffs however, she would go on to lose both games, settling for fourth place.

The next season, Einarson won her first Grand Slam event, the 2016 Boost National. Her next tour event win was at the 2017 Icebreaker at The Granite. Two weeks later she won the 2017 GSOC Tour Challenge Tier 2 event. While she didn't win any more events that season, she made it to the finals in two Grand Slams, losing to Jennifer Jones at the 2017 Masters of Curling and to Rachel Homan at the 2018 Humpty's Champions Cup. Einarson's team had a disappointing showing at the 2017 Canadian Olympic Curling Pre-Trials, where she lost in a tiebreaker. However, her team amassed enough tour points over the season to play in the first ever Scotties Tournament of Hearts wildcard game against the higher ranked Chelsea Carey rink. Einarson beat Carey for the right to represent the new "Team Wildcard" at the 2018 Scotties Tournament of Hearts. There, she went on a roll, going 9–2 in round robin pool, to finish in a three-way tie for first. In the playoffs she lost to Jennifer Jones' team Manitoba in the 1 vs. 2 game, beat Nova Scotia in the semifinal, and then lost to Jones again in the final. Despite a successful season, the Einarson team would split up.

For the 2018–19 season, Einarson would form a new team of Val Sweeting, Shannon Birchard and Briane Meilleur, all former skips. They began the season by winning four straight World Curling Tour events in three weeks: the 2018 Stu Sells Oakville Tankard, the inaugural Morris SunSpiel, and the Mother Club Fall Curling Classic, and in October they won the Curlers Corner Autumn Gold Classic. In December, the team lost in the finals of the 2018 Canada Cup and 2018 National. Their strong play during the early part of the season earned them enough points to put Einarson in the Wild Card game once again at the 2019 Scotties Tournament of Hearts. However this time, she was not successful, losing to the lower ranked Casey Scheidegger rink. The team would rebound to have a strong finish at the end of the season, winning the 2019 Players' Championship and losing in the final of the 2019 Champions Cup.

Team Einarson had two playoff finishes at the first two Slams of the 2019–20 season, losing to Anna Hasselborg in the quarterfinal of the Masters and once again to Hasselborg in the final of the Tour Challenge. The team did not have the same success at the Canada Cup as they did in 2018, finishing with a 2–4 record. However, at the 2020 Manitoba Scotties Tournament of Hearts, her team succeeded. They finished the round robin and championship round with a 7–1 record which qualified them for the final. In the final, Einarson defeated Jennifer Jones to win her second Manitoba Scotties Tournament of Hearts. Team Einarson represented Manitoba at the 2020 Scotties Tournament of Hearts, where they continued their success. They finished first in the round robin with a 9–2 record and then won the 1 vs. 2 page playoff game, qualifying them for the final. Einarson would win her first Canadian Championship with a draw to the button for an 8–7 win against Rachel Homan. For her strong play through the week of the Scotties she was named the MVP of the tournament and was awarded the second team all-star as skip. The team was set to represent Canada at the 2020 World Women's Curling Championship before the event got cancelled due to the COVID-19 pandemic. The Scotties would be their last event of the season as both the Players' Championship and the Champions Cup Grand Slam events were also cancelled due to the pandemic.

Team Einarson returned to the Scotties Tournament of Hearts in 2021 as Team Canada, played in a "curling bubble" in Calgary, with no spectators, to avoid the spread of the coronavirus. They went 7–1 in the round robin, with their only loss coming against Ontario's Rachel Homan. This qualified them for the championship round. There, they won three games and lost one to Manitoba's Jennifer Jones. They advanced to the playoffs as the second seed, defeating Alberta's Laura Walker 9–3 in the semifinal. In the final, they defeated Homan to win their second consecutive Scotties gold. Einarson was named to the First Team All-Stars for the tournament, alongside teammates Shannon Birchard and Val Sweeting. A month later, and Einarson was back in the Calgary bubble to team up with Brad Gushue at the 2021 Canadian Mixed Doubles Curling Championship. It was her first time playing mixed doubles curling. After finishing pool play with a 5–1 record, the pair won five of six of their playoff matches, including the championship game against Kadriana Sahaidak and Colton Lott. Einarson returned to the bubble for a third time in April 2021, along with her women's team to play in the two only Grand Slam events of the abbreviated season. The team made it to the semifinals of the 2021 Champions Cup where they lost to Team Homan, but got their revenge at the 2021 Players' Championship a week later, where they beat Homan in the final. The following week, Einarson and her rink represented Canada at the 2021 World Women's Curling Championship. The team had a slow start to the event, falling to 1–5 after their first six games. They turned things around, however, winning six of their seven remaining round robin games to qualifying for the playoffs. They then faced Sweden's Anna Hasselborg in the qualification game, which they lost 8–3. Right after the World Championship, Einarson travelled to Aberdeen, Scotland, to compete in the 2021 World Mixed Doubles Curling Championship with Brad Gushue. There, the pair had a strong showing, finishing the round robin with a 7–2 record. They then faced Switzerland in the qualification game which they won by stealing the extra end, thanks to a near impossible shot made by Einarson in the eighth end. They then lost to Scotland in the semifinal and Sweden in the bronze medal game, settling for fourth place.

In the 2021–22 season, Team Einarson failed to win any of their first five tour events. Their best finish came at the 2021 Sherwood Park Women's Curling Classic where they lost in the final to Tracy Fleury. The team reached the quarterfinals of the 2021 Masters, however, then missed the playoffs at the 2021 National. At the 2021 Canadian Olympic Curling Trials, the team went through the round robin with a 4–4 record. This earned them a spot in the first tiebreaker, where they defeated Casey Scheidegger 8–6. They then faced Krista McCarville in the second tiebreaker, where they lost 4–3 and were eliminated. The team's next event was the 2022 Scotties Tournament of Hearts in Thunder Bay, Ontario. Through the round robin, the defending Scotties champions posted a perfect 8–0 record, earning a spot in the playoffs. They then lost in the seeding round to New Brunswick's Andrea Crawford, meaning they would have to win three straight games to defend their championship title. In the playoffs, the team won the 3 vs. 4 page playoff against Team Fleury and then defeated New Brunswick's Crawford in the semifinal to reach the Scotties final where they would face Northern Ontario's McCarville rink. After controlling the entire game, Team Einarson sealed the victory with a steal of one in the tenth end. With the win, they became just the fourth team to win three consecutive Scotties titles. They then went on to represent Canada at the 2022 World Women's Curling Championship, where they fared much better than in 2021. The team finished the round robin tied for second place with a 9–3 record, however, due to their draw shot challenge, finished third overall. This placed them in the qualification game where they defeated Denmark's Madeleine Dupont to advance to the semifinal. There, they took on South Korea's Kim Eun-jung. After taking control in the seventh end, South Korea stole the ninth and tenth ends to hand the Canadian team a 9–6 loss. They were able to rebound in the bronze medal game with an 8–7 victory over Sweden's Anna Hasselborg. Team Einarson wrapped up their season at the final two Slams of the season. At the 2022 Players' Championship, they made it all the way to the final where they were defeated by the Hasselborg rink. At the 2022 Champions Cup, the team secured their third Grand Slam title as a foursome with a 10–6 victory over Gim Eun-ji.

The 2022–23 season began for Team Einarson at the 2022 PointsBet Invitational single elimination event where they entered as the top seeded team. After defeating Tracey Larocque and Kelsey Rocque, they lost 9–5 to the new Jennifer Jones rink in the semifinal. The team next played in the first Slam of the year, the 2022 National, where they lost 7–3 to Silvana Tirinzoni in the event final. They also reached the final of the 2022 Tour Challenge where they lost 8–4 to Rachel Homan. Team Einarson was chosen to represent Canada at the 2022 Pan Continental Curling Championships where they qualified for the playoffs as the second seeds with a 7–1 record. They then lost 6–5 to Japan in the semifinal but rebounded to beat the United States in the bronze medal game. The team won their fourth Grand Slam together by going undefeated to claim the 2022 Masters. In December, they travelled to Japan to compete in the 2022 Karuizawa International Curling Championships where they lost in the final to Kim Eun-jung. In the new year, Team Einarson made it to another Slam final where they lost 5–3 to Satsuki Fujisawa. Returning to the 2023 Scotties Tournament of Hearts as Team Canada, the team again went undefeated through the round robin but lost in the page seeding game to Manitoba's Jones. They then won both the 3 vs. 4 game and the semifinal over Nova Scotia and Northern Ontario respectively to reach another national final where they again faced Jones. After trading singles, Team Canada stole two in the fifth end to open a two-point lead. They secured their record tying fourth Scotties title with a score of five in the ninth end. The team then advanced to the 2023 World Women's Curling Championship where they reached the playoffs again with a 7–5 record. After defeating Japan in the qualification game, they lost in the semifinals for a second year in a row, 8–5 to Norway. They won another bronze medal after an 8–5 win over Sweden. Team Einarson reached the semifinals of the 2023 Players' Championship where they fell 10–3 to Isabella Wranå. They finished their season at the 2023 Champions Cup where they lost 6–5 to Team Homan in the championship game.

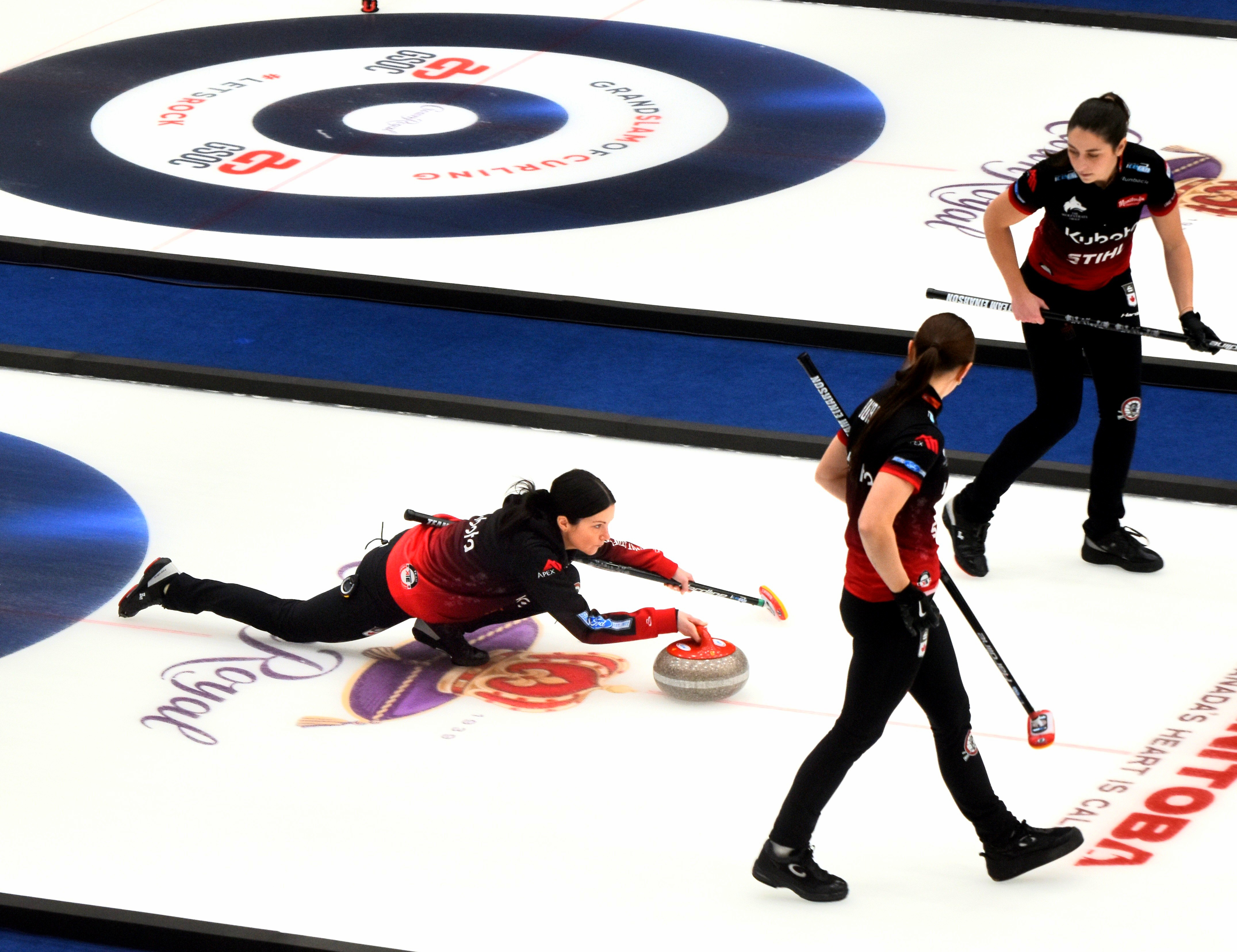
Kerri Einarson throws a rock in the final of the 2026 Players' Championship in Steinbach, Manitoba.

Team Einarson reached the quarterfinals in their first event of the 2023–24 season, falling to Serena Gray-Withers at the 2023 Saville Shootout. The team then played in the 2023 PointsBet Invitational where they lost in the final to Team Homan. For the second year in a row, they were chosen to represent Canada at the 2023 Pan Continental Curling Championships. The team did not have a great week, however, losing both the semifinal and bronze medal game to finish fourth. In Grand Slam play, Team Einarson failed to reach any finals for the first time since forming. They had three semifinal finishes and one quarterfinal appearance before missing the playoffs at the 2024 Players' Championship, breaking their streak of qualifying at the previous twelve Slams. A few hours prior to the first draw of the 2024 Scotties Tournament of Hearts, Curling Canada announced that the team's lead Briane Harris was deemed "ineligible" to play in the tournament without going into any more detail. She was replaced by alternate Krysten Karwacki. Despite the disturbance, Team Einarson managed a 7–1 record through the round robin to qualify for the championship round. Once there, however, they lost both their games to Team Homan and Manitoba's Kate Cameron, eliminating them from contention and ending their chance of a record setting fifth straight Scotties title. Following the event, in March, it was revealed that Harris had been provisionally suspended for up to four years for testing positive for Ligandrol, a banned substance. She will be appealing the decision to the Court of Arbitration for Sport. Harris was also replaced by Karwacki for the Players' Championship at the end of the season.

Einarson announced that for the 2024-25 curling season, Karwacki would join the team as a lead full-time, and Harris left the team. The new Einarson rink had a strong start to the season, winning the first Grand Slam event of the season, the 2024 Tour Challenge. However, halfway through the season, Birchard announced she would miss the remainder of the season due to a knee injury, and was replaced by Karlee Burgess as second for the remained of the season. At the 2025 Scotties Tournament of Hearts, Einarson would finish in second place, losing to Team Homan 6-1 in the final. At the end of the season, after Birchard recovered from her injury, Einarson announced for the 2025-26 curling season that Birchard would remain as second, with Burgess throwing lead stones, and Karwacki being the alternate. In their first event of the season, Einarson would win the 2025 Saville Shootout, beating Gim Eun-ji in the final. Einarson would then compete at the 2025 Canadian Olympic Curling Trials, finishing the round robin with a 6–1 record, qualifying for the playoffs. Einarson would then lose to Nova Scotia's Christina Black 6–3 in the semifinals, finishing in 3rd place. Team Einarson would rebound by winning the 2026 Scotties Tournament of Hearts, beating Manitoba's Kaitlyn Lawes 4–3 in the final, and represent Canada at the 2026 World Women's Curling Championship. There, they would go on to win the silver medal, losing to Switzerland's Xenia Schwaller 7–5 in the final. At the end of the season, Team Einarson announced that they had "parted ways" with third Sweeting, alternate Karwacki, and coach Reid Carruthers. They would later add two-time Olympian Jocelyn Peterman to the lineup as lead, with Burgess now as second and Birchard as third.

== Personal life ==
Einarson is formerly employed as a rehabilitation assistant at Betel Home Foundation, a personal care home. As of 2023, she is employed as a commercial fisher. She is married to Kyle Einarson and has two children. Einarson's brother Kyle Flett was also a competitive curler, reaching the Manitoba junior men's provincial final against Daley Peters in 2005. In 2006 he died in a snowmobile accident and Einarson still wears a necklace with a photo of the two of them today. Einarson is Métis and the Manitoba Métis Federation sponsors the team, as of the 2026 season. Einarson was awarded the Tom Longboat Award in 2021, in recognition of Indigenous athletes' "outstanding contributions to sport in Canada". Her uncle is Greg McAulay.

== Grand Slam record ==
Key
C	Champion
F	Lost in Final
SF	Lost in Semifinal
QF	Lost in Quarterfinals
R16	Lost in the round of 16
Q	Did not advance to playoffs
T2	Played in Tier 2 event
DNP	Did not participate in event
N/A	Not a Grand Slam event that season

Event	2009–10	2010–11	2011–12	2012–13	2013–14	2014–15	2015–16	2016–17	2017–18	2018–19	2019–20	2020–21	2021–22	2022–23	2023–24	2024–25	2025–26	2026–27
Invitational	N/A	N/A	N/A	N/A	N/A	N/A	T2	Q	T2	SF	F	N/A	N/A	F	SF	C	QF	C
Masters	N/A	N/A	N/A	DNP	DNP	DNP	SF	Q	F	Q	QF	N/A	QF	C	SF	QF	Q	Q
National	N/A	N/A	N/A	N/A	N/A	N/A	Q	C	Q	F	Q	N/A	Q	F	QF	SF	Q	QF
Open	N/A	N/A	N/A	N/A	N/A	DNP	DNP	Q	Q	Q	QF	N/A	N/A	F	SF	QF	QF	
Players'	Q	DNP	DNP	DNP	DNP	DNP	SF	DNP	SF	C	N/A	C	F	SF	Q	Q	F	
Champions Cup	N/A	N/A	N/A	N/A	N/A	N/A	SF	Q	F	F	N/A	SF	C	F	N/A	N/A	N/A	N/A

=== Former events ===
Event	2009–10	2010–11	2011–12	2012–13	2013–14
Colonial Square	N/A	N/A	N/A	Q	Q
Autumn Gold	SF	Q	Q	DNP	DNP
Manitoba Liquor & Lotteries	Q	Q	Q	DNP	DNP
Sobeys Slam	N/A	Q	N/A	N/A	N/A

== Teams ==
Season	Skip	Third	Second	Lead
2005–06	Kerri Flett	Jasmine Bracken	Jillian Sandison	Sarah Norget
2006–07	Kerri Flett	Jasmine Bracken	Liz Peters	Jillian Sandison
2007–08	Kerri Flett	Jasmine Bracken	Theresa Cannon	Jillian Sandison
2008–09	Kerri Flett	Liz Peters	Tamara Bauknecht	Sarah Wazney
2009–10	Kerri Flett	Janice Blair	Susan Baleja	Alison Harvey
2010–11	Kerri Einarson	Janice Blair	Susan Baleja	Alison Harvey
2011–12	Jill Thurston	Kerri Einarson	Kendra Georges	Sarah Wazney
2012–13	Kerri Einarson	Sara van Wellegham	Liz Fyfe	Krysten Karwacki
2013–14	Kerri Einarson	Selena Kaatz	Liz Fyfe	Kristin MacCuish
2014–15	Kerri Einarson	Selena Kaatz	Liz Fyfe	Kristin MacCuish
2015–16	Kerri Einarson	Selena Kaatz	Liz Fyfe	Kristin MacCuish
2016–17	Kerri Einarson	Selena Kaatz	Liz Fyfe	Kristin MacCuish
2017–18	Kerri Einarson	Selena Kaatz	Liz Fyfe	Kristin MacCuish
2018–19	Kerri Einarson	Val Sweeting	Shannon Birchard	Briane Meilleur
2019–20	Kerri Einarson	Val Sweeting	Shannon Birchard	Briane Meilleur
2020–21	Kerri Einarson	Val Sweeting	Shannon Birchard	Briane Meilleur
2021–22	Kerri Einarson	Val Sweeting	Shannon Birchard	Briane Meilleur
2022–23	Kerri Einarson	Val Sweeting	Shannon Birchard	Briane Harris
2023–24	Kerri Einarson	Val Sweeting	Shannon Birchard	Briane Harris
2024–25	Kerri Einarson	Val Sweeting	Shannon Birchard	Krysten Karwacki
2024–25	Kerri Einarson	Val Sweeting	Karlee Burgess	Krysten Karwacki
2025–26	Kerri Einarson	Val Sweeting	Shannon Birchard	Karlee Burgess
2026–27	Kerri Einarson	Shannon Birchard	Karlee Burgess	Jocelyn Peterman
