= 2026 Alberta Men's Curling Championship =

Canadian provincial men's curling championship

2026 RME New Holland Alberta Men's Summit of Champions Presented by Sentinel Storage
- Host city: Okotoks, Alberta
- Arena: The Murray Arena
- Dates: January 5–11
- Winner: Team Koe
- Curling club: The Glencoe Club, Calgary
- Skip: Kevin Koe
- Third: Tyler Tardi
- Second: Aaron Sluchinski
- Lead: Karrick Martin
- Alternate: Mike Libbus
- Coach: John Dunn
- Finalist: Johnson Tao

The 2026 RME New Holland Alberta Men's Summit of Champions presented by Sentinel Storage, the provincial men's curling championship for Alberta, was held from January 5 to 11 at The Murray Arena in Okotoks, Alberta. The winning Kevin Koe rink represented Alberta at the 2026 Montana's Brier in St. John's, Newfoundland and Labrador. The event was held in conjunction with the 2026 Alberta Women's Curling Championship, the provincial women's championship.

Having won the 2025 Montana's Brier, Team Brad Jacobs earned an automatic berth at the national championship. This meant Alberta would qualify two teams for the Brier.

== Qualification process ==
Qualification method	Berths	Qualifying teams
WCT Leaders	3	Evan van Amsterdam; Kevin Koe; Johnson Tao
Alberta Curling Tour Points	2	Jacob Libbus; Ryan Jacques
Grande Prairie Qualifier	2	Peter Hlushak; Zach Davies
Brooks Qualifier	3	Darren Moulding; Ryan Parent; James Ballance
Last Chance Red Deer Qualifier	2	Daylan Vavrek; Jamie King

== Teams ==
The teams are listed as follows:

Skip	Third	Second	Lead	Alternate	Coach	Club(s)
James Ballance	Kolby MacDonald	Michael Keenan	Oliver Burton	Christopher Pratt	Tim Krassman	Okotoks CC, Okotoks; St. Albert CC, St. Albert
Zach Davies	Ronan Peterson	William Butler	Adam Naugler		Rob Krepps	Saville Community SC, Edmonton
Peter Hlushak	Sahil Dalrymple	Varyk Doepker	Lucas Sawiak		Byron Jagoe	Saville Community SC, Edmonton
Ryan Jacques	Cole Adams	Derek Bowyer	Tyson Toews		Mickey Pendergast	Saville Community SC, Edmonton
Jamie King	Michael Jantzen	Sean Morris	Scott Manners			St. Albert CC, St. Albert
Kevin Koe	Tyler Tardi	Aaron Sluchinski	Karrick Martin	Mike Libbus	John Dunn	The Glencoe Club, Calgary
Jacob Libbus	Nathan Molberg	Zachary Pawliuk	Michael Hendricks	Brad Thiessen		Ellerslie CC, Edmonton
Darren Moulding	Kyler Kleibrink	Andrew Nerpin	Evan Crough			Calgary CC, Calgary
Ryan Parent	Jared Jenkins	Ben Savage	Ethan Drysdale		Sandra Jenkins	Calgary CC, Calgary
Johnson Tao	Kenan Wipf	Benjamin Morin	Andrew Nowell		Doug Marks	Saville Community SC, Edmonton
Evan van Amsterdam	Jeremy Harty	Jason Ginter	Parker Konschuh	Glenn Venance		Saville Community SC, Edmonton
Daylan Vavrek	Tristan Steinke	Carter Lautner	Evan Asmussen			Sexsmith CC, Sexsmith

== Knockout brackets ==
=== A Event ===
First Knockout	Qualifier 1
Evan van Amsterdam	5
Ryan Parent	4	James Ballance	2
James Ballance	7	Evan van Amsterdam	9
Jacob Libbus	7
Jacob Libbus	6
Ryan Jacques	9	Ryan Jacques	5
Jamie King	6	Evan van Amsterdam	4
Kevin Koe	7
Kevin Koe	9
Darren Moulding	9	Darren Moulding	4
Peter Hlushak	8	Kevin Koe	7
Daylan Vavrek	2
Johnson Tao	3
Zach Davies	4	Daylan Vavrek	6
Daylan Vavrek	6

=== B Event ===
Second Knockout	Qualifier 2
Ryan Parent	8
Ryan Jacques	6
Ryan Parent	9
Daylan Vavrek	8
Ryan Parent	8
Jacob Libbus	3
Zach Davies	4
Darren Moulding	10
Darren Moulding	3
Jacob Libbus	8
Ryan Parent	9
Evan van Amsterdam	6
Peter Hlushak	4
Johnson Tao	10
Johnson Tao	8
James Ballance	3
Jamie King	3
James Ballance	7
Johnson Tao	6
Evan van Amsterdam	11

=== C Event ===
Third Knockout	Qualifier 3
Johnson Tao	9
Ryan Jacques	8	Ryan Jacques	8
Zach Davies	5	Johnson Tao	6
Jacob Libbus	5
James Ballance	3
Jacob Libbus	9

Third Knockout	Qualifier 4
Peter Hlushak	11
Evan van Amsterdam	7
Daylan Vavrek	7
Peter Hlushak	5	Darren Moulding	5
Darren Moulding	10
Jamie King	7
Darren Moulding	8

== Knockout results ==
All draw times are listed in Mountain Time (UTC-07:00).

=== Draw 1 ===
Monday, January 5, 6:30 pm

Sheet B	1	2	3	4	5	6	7	8	9	10	Final
Ryan Jacques	0	2	0	4	1	0	0	2	0	X	9
Jamie King 🔨	1	0	1	0	0	1	1	0	2	X	6

Sheet D	1	2	3	4	5	6	7	8	9	10	Final
Ryan Parent 🔨	1	0	0	0	1	1	0	1	0	X	4
James Ballance	0	2	1	2	0	0	1	0	1	X	7

=== Draw 2 ===
Tuesday, January 6, 9:00 am

Sheet A	1	2	3	4	5	6	7	8	9	10	Final
Zach Davies 🔨	0	0	0	0	1	0	1	1	1	0	4
Daylan Vavrek	0	1	1	1	0	2	0	0	0	1	6

Sheet C	1	2	3	4	5	6	7	8	9	10	Final
Darren Moulding	0	0	3	0	3	1	0	1	0	1	9
Peter Hlushak 🔨	1	2	0	1	0	0	2	0	2	0	8

=== Draw 3 ===
Tuesday, January 6, 1:30 pm

Sheet B	1	2	3	4	5	6	7	8	9	10	Final
Evan van Amsterdam 🔨	0	1	0	1	0	0	2	1	0	X	5
James Ballance	0	0	0	0	0	0	0	0	2	X	2

Sheet D	1	2	3	4	5	6	7	8	9	10	Final
Jacob Libbus	0	1	0	1	0	1	0	1	1	1	6
Ryan Jacques 🔨	3	0	1	0	1	0	0	0	0	0	5

=== Draw 4 ===
Tuesday, January 6, 6:30 pm

Sheet A	1	2	3	4	5	6	7	8	9	10	Final
Kevin Koe 🔨	0	2	0	1	0	1	0	0	2	3	9
Darren Moulding	0	0	1	0	2	0	1	0	0	0	4

Sheet C	1	2	3	4	5	6	7	8	9	10	Final
Johnson Tao 🔨	0	1	0	0	0	1	0	1	0	0	3
Daylan Vavrek	0	0	0	0	1	0	2	0	2	1	6

=== Draw 5 ===
Wednesday, January 7, 9:00 am

Sheet A	1	2	3	4	5	6	7	8	9	10	Final
Ryan Parent 🔨	2	1	0	0	1	0	1	2	0	1	8
Ryan Jacques	0	0	2	1	0	1	0	0	2	0	6

Sheet B	1	2	3	4	5	6	7	8	9	10	Final
Zach Davies 🔨	1	0	0	1	0	2	0	0	X	X	4
Darren Moulding	0	0	2	0	2	0	4	2	X	X	10

=== Draw 6 ===
Wednesday, January 7, 1:30 pm

Sheet A	1	2	3	4	5	6	7	8	9	10	Final
Jamie King	1	0	0	0	1	0	0	1	0	X	3
James Ballance 🔨	0	1	0	1	0	0	2	0	3	X	7

Sheet B	1	2	3	4	5	6	7	8	9	10	Final
Peter Hlushak	0	0	0	2	0	0	2	0	X	X	4
Johnson Tao 🔨	1	2	1	0	0	2	0	4	X	X	10

=== Draw 7 ===
Wednesday, January 7, 6:30 pm

Sheet A	1	2	3	4	5	6	7	8	9	10	11	Final
Evan van Amsterdam	0	1	0	2	0	1	0	0	3	0	2	9
Jacob Libbus 🔨	2	0	1	0	1	0	1	1	0	1	0	7

Sheet B	1	2	3	4	5	6	7	8	9	10	Final
Kevin Koe	1	0	0	0	0	3	0	2	1	X	7
Daylan Vavrek 🔨	0	0	0	1	0	0	1	0	0	X	2

=== Draw 8 ===
Thursday, January 8, 9:00 am

Sheet C	1	2	3	4	5	6	7	8	9	10	Final
Ryan Jacques 🔨	0	0	1	0	2	1	0	1	1	2	8
Zach Davies	1	1	0	1	0	0	2	0	0	0	5

Sheet D	1	2	3	4	5	6	7	8	9	10	Final
Johnson Tao 🔨	2	0	0	2	0	1	1	0	2	X	8
James Ballance	0	1	0	0	1	0	0	1	0	X	3

=== Draw 9 ===
Thursday, January 8, 1:30 pm

Sheet C	1	2	3	4	5	6	7	8	9	10	Final
Darren Moulding 🔨	0	0	0	0	2	0	1	0	0	X	3
Jacob Libbus	0	0	0	1	0	2	0	2	3	X	8

Sheet D	1	2	3	4	5	6	7	8	9	10	11	Final
Ryan Parent 🔨	0	1	0	0	2	0	3	0	2	0	1	9
Daylan Vavrek	1	0	1	1	0	1	0	1	0	3	0	8

=== Draw 10 ===
Thursday, January 8, 6:30 pm

Sheet D	1	2	3	4	5	6	7	8	9	10	Final
Evan van Amsterdam 🔨	1	0	2	0	0	1	0	0	0	X	4
Kevin Koe	0	1	0	0	1	0	2	1	2	X	7

=== Draw 11 ===
Friday, January 9, 9:00 am

Sheet A	1	2	3	4	5	6	7	8	9	10	Final
Johnson Tao	1	0	2	0	0	2	0	1	0	X	6
Evan van Amsterdam 🔨	0	1	0	0	5	0	2	0	3	X	11

Sheet B	1	2	3	4	5	6	7	8	9	10	Final
Ryan Parent 🔨	0	1	3	0	1	0	2	1	X	X	8
Jacob Libbus	0	0	0	2	0	1	0	0	X	X	3

=== Draw 12 ===
Friday, January 9, 1:30 pm

Sheet B	1	2	3	4	5	6	7	8	9	10	Final
Jamie King 🔨	0	1	0	2	0	0	1	3	0	0	7
Darren Moulding	1	0	2	0	2	1	0	0	1	1	8

Sheet D	1	2	3	4	5	6	7	8	9	10	Final
Peter Hlushak	0	4	1	0	2	0	1	0	3	X	11
Daylan Vavrek 🔨	1	0	0	2	0	2	0	2	0	X	7

=== Draw 13 ===
Friday, January 9, 6:30 pm

Sheet B	1	2	3	4	5	6	7	8	9	10	Final
James Ballance 🔨	0	0	2	0	1	0	X	X	X	X	3
Jacob Libbus	1	2	0	2	0	4	X	X	X	X	9

Sheet C	1	2	3	4	5	6	7	8	9	10	Final
Ryan Parent 🔨	4	2	0	0	1	0	1	0	1	X	9
Evan van Amsterdam	0	0	1	1	0	1	0	3	0	X	6

=== Draw 14 ===
Saturday, January 10, 9:00 am

Sheet A	1	2	3	4	5	6	7	8	9	10	Final
Peter Hlushak	0	2	0	2	0	0	1	0	0	X	5
Darren Moulding 🔨	2	0	1	0	3	0	0	3	1	X	10

Sheet D	1	2	3	4	5	6	7	8	9	10	Final
Johnson Tao 🔨	0	0	0	3	0	1	2	0	1	2	9
Ryan Jacques	0	2	2	0	2	0	0	2	0	0	8

=== Draw 15 ===
Saturday, January 10, 1:30 pm

Sheet A	1	2	3	4	5	6	7	8	9	10	Final
Johnson Tao 🔨	0	0	1	0	1	0	0	1	0	3	6
Jacob Libbus	0	0	0	1	0	2	0	0	2	0	5

Sheet B	1	2	3	4	5	6	7	8	9	10	Final
Evan van Amsterdam 🔨	0	1	1	0	0	2	0	2	0	1	7
Darren Moulding	0	0	0	0	2	0	2	0	1	0	5

== Playoffs ==
Page playoff system
A	Kevin Koe	11
B	Ryan Parent	5
C1	Johnson Tao	6
C2	Evan van Amsterdam	5

Semifinal
B	Ryan Parent	6
C1	Johnson Tao	9

Final
A	Kevin Koe	9
C1	Johnson Tao	7

=== A vs. B ===
Saturday, January 10, 6:30 pm

Sheet B	1	2	3	4	5	6	7	8	9	10	Final
Kevin Koe 🔨	2	1	0	0	3	0	1	1	3	X	11
Ryan Parent	0	0	3	1	0	1	0	0	0	X	5

=== C1 vs. C2 ===
Saturday, January 10, 6:30 pm

Sheet A	1	2	3	4	5	6	7	8	9	10	11	Final
Johnson Tao	0	0	0	0	0	2	0	2	1	0	1	6
Evan van Amsterdam 🔨	0	0	0	1	0	0	2	0	0	2	0	5

=== Semifinal ===
Sunday, January 11, 9:30 am

Sheet B	1	2	3	4	5	6	7	8	9	10	Final
Ryan Parent 🔨	0	0	2	0	0	1	2	0	1	0	6
Johnson Tao	0	2	0	2	0	0	0	2	0	3	9

=== Final ===
Sunday, January 11, 2:30 pm

Sheet B	1	2	3	4	5	6	7	8	9	10	Final
Kevin Koe 🔨	1	1	0	2	0	0	3	1	0	1	9
Johnson Tao	0	0	2	0	2	1	0	0	2	0	7

2026 Alberta Men's Curling Championship

Kevin Koe
10th Alberta Provincial Championship title
