= Johnson Tao =

Canadian curler (born 2002)

- Curler
- Born: Tao Jing Xuan; December 10, 2002 (age 23); Beijing, China

Team
- Curling club: Saville Community SC, Edmonton, AB
- Skip: Kevin Koe
- Third: Johnson Tao
- Second: Aaron Sluchinski
- Lead: Karrick Martin
- Mixed doubles partner: Zoe Cinnamon

Curling career
- Member Association: British Columbia (2015–2020); Alberta (2020–present)
- Top CTRS ranking: 19th (2025–26)

Johnson Tao (born December 10, 2002, in Beijing, China) is a Canadian curler from Richmond, British Columbia, currently residing in Edmonton, Alberta. He currently plays third on Team Kevin Koe and mixed doubles with Zoe Cinnamon.

== Career ==
=== Juniors ===
In 2016, at just 13 years old, Tao qualified for the BC Winter Games. He continued competing on the BC junior circuit until the 2019–20 season where he skipped his team of Toby Mills, Connor Kent and Michael Nunn to a second place finish at the BC junior championship, falling short in the final to Hayato Sato. However, as Langley was hosting the 2020 Canadian Junior Curling Championships, British Columbia earned a host spot at the event that went to Tao's rink. There, the team finished in ninth place with a 5–4 record after losing in a tiebreaker to Sato.

After graduating high school, Tao was recruited to the University of Alberta Golden Bears where he began skipping the junior team of Jaedon Neuert, Benjamin Morin and Andrew Nowell. During the 2021–22 season, the team found success on the men's tour, reaching the final of the Okotoks Under-25 Tour Spiel and the Avonair Alberta Curling Series. They also represented Alberta at the 2021 World Junior Qualification Event where after a 4–1 round robin record, they lost in the quarterfinal to Saskatchewan's Daymond Bernath. In the new year, the team won the Alberta junior provincial title after winning four straight sudden death matches. This sent them to the 2022 Canadian Junior Curling Championships where they finished 7–1 through the round robin to earn a berth in the playoffs. They then beat British Columbia and Manitoba in the quarterfinals and semifinals respectively to reach the final. There, they lost 10–4 to Ontario's Landan Rooney, settling for silver. Also during the season, the team qualified for the 2022 Boston Pizza Cup but were forced to forfeit their spot due to positive COVID-19 tests.

The following season, Andrew Nowell aged out of juniors and was replaced by Adam Naugler at lead. On tour, the team had a pair of semifinal finishes at Alberta Curling Series events and a quarterfinal finish at the Original 16 Tour Bonspiel. They also won the Slave Lake qualifier for the 2023 Boston Pizza Cup, however, finished 0–3 at the provincial championship. At the Alberta junior championship, the team fell short in the final 6–4 to James Ballance. Despite this, they still earned a spot at the 2023 Canadian Junior Curling Championships as Alberta 2. At the championship, Team Tao topped their pool in the round robin with a 7–1 record to earn a bye to the semifinal. They then beat Ontario's Rooney before defeating Northern Ontario's Dallas Burgess 7–4 to secure the national championship. This earned them a berth into the 2023 PointsBet Invitational the following season as well as the right to represent Canada at the 2023 World Junior-B Curling Championships where they would need to finish in the top four to qualify for the 2024 World Junior Curling Championships. Tao also skipped the Golden Bears to a fifth place finish at the 2023 U Sports/Curling Canada University Curling Championships the week before the Canadian junior championship.

Because the Canadian and world junior championships were held in different seasons, second Benjamin Morin had aged out of juniors and was unable to compete. His spot was taken by Zach Davies. For the 2023–24 season, Tao and Neuert competed with both their junior teammates Davies and Naugler as well as their men's teammates Morin and Nowell on tour leading up to the world juniors. With the junior team, they finished 2–3 at the U25 NextGen Classic and lost their opening round match at the PointsBet Invitational to Reid Carruthers 10–3. With their men's team, they reached the semifinals of the 2023 Saville Shootout and the quarterfinals of the Saville Grand Prix. In December, the junior team represented Canada at the world junior-B championship where after a 4–2 round robin record, they won all three of their playoff games to win the gold medal, qualifying for the world championship in February. There, the team struggled against a more competitive field, ultimately finishing in seventh with a 4–5 record and failing to qualify for the playoffs. Back with his men's team, Tao again finished 0–3 at the 2024 Boston Pizza Cup, however, won the Canada West title to qualify for the 2024 U Sports/Curling Canada University Curling Championships. There, the Golden Bears topped the round robin with a 6–1 record. In the semifinal, they lost 7–5 to Regina, however, bounced back to beat Wilfrid Laurier for the bronze medal.

=== Men's ===
After splitting his time between juniors and men's, Tao returned to his men's team of Neuert, Morin and Nowell fulltime for the 2024–25 season. On tour, the team had middling results, reaching the playoffs three times in ten events played. At the 2025 Boston Pizza Cup, the team finished 2–3 after suffering losses to both finalists Kevin Koe and Evan van Amsterdam. They also failed to qualify for the 2025 U Sports/Curling Canada University Curling Championships after a fourth place finish at the Canada West championship. They ended their season with a third-place finish at the Best of the West U30 event. Following the season, Neuert left the team and was replaced by Kenan Wipf at third. This lineup saw more success as they won the Original 16 Tour Spiel, reached the semifinals of the 2025 Saville Shootout and the U25 Tour Challenge Grand Slam and reached the quarterfinals of the Red Deer Curling Classic. At the 2026 Alberta Men's Curling Championship, the team had a strong showing, winning four straight elimination games to reach the provincial final where they fell short to Team Koe 9–7.

For the 2026–27 season, Tao was added to Koe's lineup as his new third after Tyler Tardi left to form his own team. The team also included second Aaron Sluchinski and lead Karrick Martin.

=== Mixed doubles ===
Tao found his first success in mixed doubles during the 2024–25 season with partner Zoe Cinnamon. At the U25 NextGen Classic, the team reached the semifinals where they lost to Mackenzie Arbuckle and Aaron Macdonell. They also teamed up for an unbeaten run at the end of the season to win the World Open U25 Mixed Doubles Championship.

The following season, the pair made it to the semifinal round of the Saville Mixed Doubles Classic and finished 2–3 at the NextGen Classic. In the new year, the team had another strong showing at the Alberta mixed doubles championship, going undefeated to claim the provincial title. At the 2026 Canadian Mixed Doubles Curling Championship, the duo finished first in their pool with a 5–1 record, earning a direct bye to the quarterfinal round. They then came from behind in both their quarterfinal and semifinal matches to eliminate Melissa Adams and Alex Robichaud and Katie Ford and Oliver Campbell. This qualified them for the championship game where they came up short against Serena Gray-Withers and Victor Pietrangelo 10–9, despite scoring six in the opening end.

To start the 2026–27 season, Cinnamon and Tao got their revenge on Gray-Withers and Pietrangelo by beating them in the final of the U25 NextGen Classic.

== Personal life ==
Tao works at the Wings of Providence family violence shelter in Edmonton. He studied business at the University of Alberta. He previously attended Burnett Secondary School.

Tao and his family emigrated to British Columbia at the age of 7, just before the 2010 Winter Olympics in Vancouver. The family bought tickets to watch the curling events, which sparked an interest in the sport for him.

== Teams ==
Season	Skip	Third	Second	Lead
2015–16	Gabriel Kwok	Brandon Tong	Johnson Tao	Jay Hou
2017–18	Johnson Tao	Branden Reimer	Connor Deane	David Loken
2018–19	Johnson Tao	Toby Mills	Daniel Dabiri	Jay Ueda
2019–20	Johnson Tao	Toby Mills	Connor Kent	Michael Nunn
2020–21	Johnson Tao	Jaedon Neuert	Benjamin Morin	Andrew Nowell
2021–22	Johnson Tao	Jaedon Neuert	Benjamin Morin	Andrew Nowell
2022–23	Johnson Tao	Jaedon Neuert	Benjamin Morin	Adam Naugler
2023–24	Johnson Tao	Jaedon Neuert	Benjamin Morin	Andrew Nowell
2023–24	Johnson Tao	Jaedon Neuert	Zach Davies	Adam Naugler
2024–25	Johnson Tao	Jaedon Neuert	Benjamin Morin	Andrew Nowell
2025–26	Johnson Tao	Kenan Wipf	Benjamin Morin	Andrew Nowell
2026–27	Kevin Koe	Johnson Tao	Aaron Sluchinski	Karrick Martin
