= 2025 Boston Pizza Cup =

Curling competition held in Alberta, Canada

- Host city: Stettler, Alberta
- Arena: Stettler Recreation Centre
- Dates: February 5–9
- Winner: Team Koe
- Curling club: The Glencoe Club, Calgary
- Skip: Kevin Koe
- Third: Aaron Sluchinski
- Second: Tyler Tardi
- Lead: Karrick Martin
- Coach: John Dunne
- Finalist: Evan van Amsterdam

The 2025 Boston Pizza Cup, the provincial men's curling championship for Alberta, was held from February 5 to 9 at the Stettler Recreation Centre in Stettler, Alberta. The winning Kevin Koe rink represented Alberta at the 2025 Montana's Brier in Kelowna, British Columbia.

== Qualification process ==
Qualification method	Berths	Qualifying team(s)
WCT Leaders	3	Cole Adams; Kevin Koe; Evan van Amsterdam
Alberta Curling Tour Points	2	Ryan Jacques; Johnson Tao
Grand Prairie Qualifier	1	Daylan Vavrek
Leduc Qualifier	4	Zach Davies; Rob Johnson; Benjamin Kiist; Jacob Libbus
Cochrane Last Chance Qualifier	2	Daniel Humbke; Jamie King

== Teams ==
The teams are listed as follows:

Skip	Third	Second	Lead	Alternate	Coach	Club(s)
Cole Adams	Derek Bowyer	Jeremy Harty	Tyson Toews		Mickey Pendergast	Calgary CC, Calgary
Zach Davies	Ronan Peterson	William Butler	Lucas Sawiak		Skip Wilson	Saville Community SC, Edmonton
Daniel Humbke	Daniel Bubola	Garrett Johnston	Colton Brand	Wade Johnston		Lacombe CC, Lacombe
Ryan Jacques	Ryan Parent	Jordan Tardi	Ethan Drysdale	Tyler Powell	Kevin Parent	Saville Community SC, Edmonton
Rob Johnson	Lyle Kent	Russ Jennings	Mark Wood			Irricana CC, Irricana
Benjamin Kiist	Terren Algot	Noah Mason-Wood	Rhett Whittmire	Lowell Whittmire	Tim Krassman	Sherwood Park CC, Sherwood Park
Jamie King	Mike Jantzen	Sean Morris	Todd Brick			Calgary CC, Calgary
Kevin Koe	Aaron Sluchinski	Tyler Tardi	Karrick Martin	Mike Libbus	John Dunn	The Glencoe Club, Calgary
Jacob Libbus	Nathan Molberg	Zach Pawliuk	Michael Hendricks	Brad Thiessen		Ellerslie CC, Edmonton
Johnson Tao	Jaedon Neuert	Ben Morin	Andrew Nowell		Rob Krepps	Saville Community SC, Edmonton
Evan van Amsterdam	Jason Ginter	Sterling Middleton	Parker Konschuh			Saville Community SC, Edmonton
Daylan Vavrek	Tristan Steinke	Carter Lautner	Evan Asmussen			Sexsmith CC, Sexsmith

== Knockout brackets ==
=== A event ===
First Knockout	Qualifier 1
Kevin Koe	10
Daylan Vavrek	9	Daylan Vavrek	7
Benjamin Kiist	6	Kevin Koe	6
Johnson Tao	4
Johnson Tao	8
Ryan Jacques	6	Rob Johnson	5
Rob Johnson	7	Kevin Koe	9
Cole Adams	7
Evan van Amsterdam	8
Zach Davies	1	Daniel Humbke	7
Daniel Humbke	8	Evan van Amsterdam	5
Cole Adams	8
Cole Adams	10
Jacob Libbus	10	Jacob Libbus	4
Jamie King	7

=== B Event ===
Second Knockout	Qualifier 2
Benjamin Kiist	11
Rob Johnson	4
Benjamin Kiist	4
Evan van Amsterdam	9
Evan van Amsterdam	7
Johnson Tao	4
Daniel Humbke	9
Jamie King	7
Daniel Humbke	8
Johnson Tao	9
Evan van Amsterdam	7
Jacob Libbus	6
Zach Davies	1
Jacob Libbus	9
Jacob Libbus	7
Daylan Vavrek	3
Ryan Jacques	3
Daylan Vavrek	10
Jacob Libbus	8
Cole Adams	2

=== C Event ===
Third Knockout	Qualifier 3
Cole Adams	7
Rob Johnson	7	Jamie King	8
Jamie King	9	Jamie King	4
Daylan Vavrek	7
Daylan Vavrek	7
Johnson Tao	4

Third Knockout	Qualifier 4
Zach Davies	10
Jacob Libbus	10
Benjamin Kiist	5
Zach Davies	8	Zach Davies	4
Ryan Jacques	2
Ryan Jacques	10
Daniel Humbke	8

== Knockout results ==
All draw times are listed in Mountain Time (UTC-07:00).

=== Draw 1 ===
Wednesday, February 5, 1:00 pm

Sheet A	1	2	3	4	5	6	7	8	9	10	Final
Jacob Libbus 🔨	0	1	0	2	2	0	2	3	0	X	10
Jamie King	1	0	1	0	0	3	0	0	2	X	7

Sheet B	1	2	3	4	5	6	7	8	9	10	Final
Zach Davies	0	0	1	0	0	0	0	0	X	X	1
Daniel Humbke 🔨	0	2	0	0	1	1	1	3	X	X	8

Sheet C	1	2	3	4	5	6	7	8	9	10	Final
Ryan Jacques	0	2	0	0	1	0	2	1	0	0	6
Rob Johnson 🔨	0	0	2	1	0	1	0	0	2	1	7

Sheet D	1	2	3	4	5	6	7	8	9	10	Final
Daylan Vavrek 🔨	0	1	0	1	0	2	0	1	0	4	9
Benjamin Kiist	0	0	1	0	3	0	1	0	1	0	6

=== Draw 2 ===
Wednesday, February 5, 7:00 pm

Sheet A	1	2	3	4	5	6	7	8	9	10	Final
Evan van Amsterdam	1	0	1	0	0	3	0	2	0	1	8
Daniel Humbke 🔨	0	2	0	2	0	0	1	0	2	0	7

Sheet B	1	2	3	4	5	6	7	8	9	10	Final
Cole Adams	0	2	0	1	0	4	3	X	X	X	10
Jacob Libbus 🔨	1	0	2	0	1	0	0	X	X	X	4

Sheet C	1	2	3	4	5	6	7	8	9	10	Final
Kevin Koe 🔨	2	0	1	0	2	2	0	0	3	X	10
Daylan Vavrek	0	3	0	2	0	0	2	0	0	X	7

Sheet D	1	2	3	4	5	6	7	8	9	10	Final
Johnson Tao 🔨	2	0	2	0	0	1	0	1	0	2	8
Rob Johnson	0	1	0	2	0	0	1	0	1	0	5

=== Draw 3 ===
Thursday, February 6, 9:00 am

Sheet B	1	2	3	4	5	6	7	8	9	10	11	Final
Jamie King 🔨	3	0	0	0	0	0	1	0	3	0	0	7
Daniel Humbke	0	2	1	0	0	1	0	2	0	1	2	9

Sheet C	1	2	3	4	5	6	7	8	9	10	Final
Rob Johnson	0	0	0	1	0	3	0	0	X	X	4
Benjamin Kiist 🔨	2	1	4	0	1	0	1	2	X	X	11

=== Draw 4 ===
Thursday, February 6, 2:00 pm

Sheet A	1	2	3	4	5	6	7	8	9	10	Final
Johnson Tao 🔨	0	0	1	0	0	0	2	0	1	0	4
Kevin Koe	0	0	0	0	0	2	0	3	0	1	6

Sheet B	1	2	3	4	5	6	7	8	9	10	Final
Ryan Jacques	0	1	0	0	2	0	X	X	X	X	3
Daylan Vavrek 🔨	1	0	0	3	0	6	X	X	X	X	10

Sheet C	1	2	3	4	5	6	7	8	9	10	Final
Zach Davies	0	0	0	1	0	X	X	X	X	X	1
Jacob Libbus 🔨	3	0	2	0	4	X	X	X	X	X	9

Sheet D	1	2	3	4	5	6	7	8	9	10	Final
Evan van Amsterdam	0	0	3	0	0	1	0	1	0	0	5
Cole Adams 🔨	0	1	0	2	1	0	1	0	2	1	8

=== Draw 5 ===
Thursday, February 6, 7:00 pm

Sheet A	1	2	3	4	5	6	7	8	9	10	Final
Jacob Libbus	0	0	1	0	0	2	0	0	2	2	7
Daylan Vavrek 🔨	0	1	0	1	0	0	1	0	0	0	3

Sheet B	1	2	3	4	5	6	7	8	9	10	Final
Benjamin Kiist	1	0	1	0	1	0	1	X	X	X	4
Evan van Amsterdam 🔨	0	2	0	3	0	4	0	X	X	X	9

Sheet C	1	2	3	4	5	6	7	8	9	10	Final
Kevin Koe 🔨	0	3	0	2	0	2	0	0	2	X	9
Cole Adams	0	0	3	0	2	0	0	2	0	X	7

Sheet D	1	2	3	4	5	6	7	8	9	10	11	Final
Daniel Humbke 🔨	2	0	0	1	0	1	1	0	2	1	0	8
Johnson Tao	0	2	2	0	3	0	0	1	0	0	1	9

=== Draw 6 ===
Friday, February 7, 8:30 am

Sheet A	1	2	3	4	5	6	7	8	9	10	Final
Zach Davies 🔨	0	0	3	2	0	0	3	1	1	X	10
Benjamin Kiist	0	1	0	0	2	2	0	0	0	X	5

Sheet C	1	2	3	4	5	6	7	8	9	10	Final
Ryan Jacques 🔨	2	0	3	0	2	0	1	0	1	1	10
Daniel Humbke	0	2	0	2	0	2	0	2	0	0	8

Sheet D	1	2	3	4	5	6	7	8	9	10	Final
Rob Johnson	1	0	1	1	0	0	1	0	3	0	7
Jamie King 🔨	0	3	0	0	3	0	0	2	0	1	9

=== Draw 7 ===
Friday, February 7, 1:00 pm

Sheet A	1	2	3	4	5	6	7	8	9	10	Final
Evan van Amsterdam 🔨	1	0	2	0	1	0	1	0	2	X	7
Johnson Tao	0	1	0	0	0	2	0	1	0	X	4

Sheet D	1	2	3	4	5	6	7	8	9	10	Final
Cole Adams	0	1	0	0	1	0	X	X	X	X	2
Jacob Libbus 🔨	2	0	3	0	0	3	X	X	X	X	8

=== Draw 8 ===
Friday, February 7, 5:30 pm

Sheet A	1	2	3	4	5	6	7	8	9	10	Final
Cole Adams	0	0	1	0	0	0	3	1	2	0	7
Jamie King 🔨	2	1	0	2	1	1	0	0	0	1	8

Sheet B	1	2	3	4	5	6	7	8	9	10	Final
Daylan Vavrek 🔨	0	0	1	0	0	5	0	1	0	X	7
Johnson Tao	0	0	0	1	1	0	1	0	1	X	4

Sheet C	1	2	3	4	5	6	7	8	9	10	Final
Evan van Amsterdam 🔨	1	0	2	1	0	1	0	0	2	0	7
Jacob Libbus	0	1	0	0	2	0	0	2	0	1	6

Sheet D	1	2	3	4	5	6	7	8	9	10	Final
Zach Davies 🔨	2	0	2	1	2	1	0	X	X	X	8
Ryan Jacques	0	1	0	0	0	0	1	X	X	X	2

=== Draw 9 ===
Saturday, February 8, 1:30 pm

Sheet A	1	2	3	4	5	6	7	8	9	10	Final
Jacob Libbus	0	2	0	2	0	2	0	4	X	X	10
Zach Davies 🔨	1	0	1	0	1	0	1	0	X	X	4

Sheet D	1	2	3	4	5	6	7	8	9	10	Final
Jamie King	0	0	0	1	0	0	2	0	1	X	4
Daylan Vavrek 🔨	3	0	1	0	0	1	0	2	0	X	7

== Playoffs ==
Page playoff system
A	Kevin Koe	6
B	Evan van Amsterdam	4
C1	Daylan Vavrek	6
C2	Jacob Libbus	3

Semifinal
B	Evan van Amsterdam	5
C1	Daylan Vavrek	1

Final
A	Kevin Koe	9
B	Evan van Amsterdam	5

=== A vs. B ===
Saturday, February 8, 6:30 pm

Sheet C	1	2	3	4	5	6	7	8	9	10	Final
Kevin Koe 🔨	0	0	3	0	0	1	0	1	0	1	6
Evan van Amsterdam	0	0	0	0	1	0	2	0	1	0	4

=== C1 vs. C2 ===
Saturday, February 8, 6:30 pm

Sheet B	1	2	3	4	5	6	7	8	9	10	Final
Daylan Vavrek 🔨	0	2	1	0	1	0	1	1	0	X	6
Jacob Libbus	0	0	0	1	0	1	0	0	1	X	3

=== Semifinal ===
Sunday, February 9, 10:00 am

Sheet B	1	2	3	4	5	6	7	8	9	10	Final
Evan van Amsterdam 🔨	0	1	0	0	0	0	2	1	1	X	5
Daylan Vavrek	0	0	0	0	0	1	0	0	0	X	1

=== Final ===
Sunday, February 9, 3:00 pm

Sheet B	1	2	3	4	5	6	7	8	9	10	Final
Kevin Koe 🔨	2	0	2	0	2	1	0	0	2	X	9
Evan van Amsterdam	0	2	0	1	0	0	0	2	0	X	5

2025 Boston Pizza Cup

Kevin Koe
9th Alberta Provincial Championship title
