= 2024 Boston Pizza Cup =

Curling competition held in Alberta, Canada

- Host city: Hinton, Alberta
- Arena: Bill Thomson Arena
- Dates: February 7–11
- Winner: Team Sluchinski
- Curling club: Airdrie CC, Airdrie
- Skip: Aaron Sluchinski
- Third: Jeremy Harty
- Second: Kerr Drummond
- Lead: Dylan Webster
- Coach: Mickey Pendergast
- Finalist: Kevin Koe

The 2024 Boston Pizza Cup, the provincial men's curling championship for Alberta, was held from February 7 to 11 at the Bill Thomson Arena in Hinton, Alberta. The winning Aaron Sluchinski rink represented Alberta at the 2024 Montana's Brier in Regina, Saskatchewan where they finished tied for fifth in Pool B with a 4–4 record.

Additionally, the runner-up Kevin Koe rink qualified for the Brier as the highest ranked team in the CTRS standings that didn't win provincials. They finished eighth in Pool B with a 2–6 record.

== Qualification process ==
Qualification method	Berths	Qualifying team(s)
WCT Leaders	3	Kevin Koe; Aaron Sluchinski; Karsten Sturmay
Alberta Curling Tour Points	2	Ryan Parent; Johnson Tao
Granite (Edmonton) Qualifier	3	Cole Adams; Ryan Jacques; Jacob Libbus
Grand Prairie Qualifier	2	Daylan Vavrek; Scott Webb
Calgary Last Chance Qualifier	2	Andrew Dunbar; Jared Jenkins

== Teams ==
The teams are listed as follows:

Skip	Third	Second	Lead	Alternate	Coach	Club(s)
Cole Adams	Derek Bowyer	Evan Crough	Tyson Toews		Carolyn McRorie	Calgary CC, Calgary
Andrew Dunbar	Michael Lambert	Morgan Van Doesburg	John Richie		Warren Dunbar	Crestwood CC, Edmonton
Jacob Libbus	Nathan Molberg	Zach Pawliuk	Michael Hendricks	Tyler Gritten		Ellerslie CC, Edmonton
Ryan Jacques	Evan van Amsterdam	Andrew Gittis	Gabe Dyck			Saville Community SC, Edmonton
Jared Jenkins	Benjamin Savage	Kyle Thompson	Mike McIntyre			North Hill CC, Calgary
Kevin Koe	Tyler Tardi	Jacques Gauthier	Karrick Martin		Mike Libbus	The Glencoe Club, Calgary
Ryan Parent	Tyler Powell	James Ballance	Ethan Drysdale		Kevin Parent	Calgary CC, Calgary
Aaron Sluchinski	Jeremy Harty	Kerr Drummond	Dylan Webster		Mickey Pendergast	Airdrie CC, Airdrie
Karsten Sturmay	Kyle Doering	Glenn Venance	Kurtis Goller	J. D. Lind		Kitscoty CC, Kitscoty
Johnson Tao	Jaedon Neuert	Ben Morin	Adam Naugler		Rob Krepps	Saville Community SC, Edmonton
Daylan Vavrek	Roland Robinson	Carter Lautner	Evan Asmussen			Sexsmith CC, Sexsmith
Scott Webb	Tristan Steinke	Chris Kennedy	Jordan Steinke	Tracy Steinke		Grande Prairie CC, Grande Prairie

== Knockout brackets ==
=== A event ===
First Knockout	Qualifier 1
Kevin Koe	8
Scott Webb	5	Jacob Libbus	3
Jacob Libbus	9	Kevin Koe	12
Daylan Vavrek	2
Ryan Parent	4
Johnson Tao	2	Daylan Vavrek	8
Daylan Vavrek	7	Kevin Koe	5
Karsten Sturmay	1
Aaron Sluchinski	8
Ryan Jacques	6	Andrew Dunbar	1
Andrew Dunbar	7	Aaron Sluchinski	2
Karsten Sturmay	8
Karsten Sturmay	10
Cole Adams	4	Jared Jenkins	4
Jared Jenkins	8

=== B event ===
Second Knockout	Qualifier 2
Scott Webb	7
Ryan Parent	6	Scott Webb	2
Aaron Sluchinski	7
Aaron Sluchinski	8
Cole Adams	9	Cole Adams	6
Andrew Dunbar	8	Cole Adams	11
Daylan Vavrek	7
Aaron Sluchinski	7
Ryan Jacques	7	Karsten Sturmay	6
Jared Jenkins	5	Ryan Jacques	13
Johnson Tao	7	Jacob Libbus	7
Jacob Libbus	8	Ryan Jacques	3
Karsten Sturmay	7

=== C event ===
Third Knockout				Qualifier 3
		Ryan Jacques	6
Ryan Parent	10	Ryan Parent	7
Andrew Dunbar	5			Ryan Parent	9
				Cole Adams	10
		Jacob Libbus	5
		Cole Adams	6

Third Knockout				Qualifier 4
Jared Jenkins	6
Scott Webb	8	Scott Webb	6
Johnson Tao	5	Daylan Vavrek	8
Daylan Vavrek	7			Daylan Vavrek	2
				Karsten Sturmay	8

== Knockout results ==
All draw times are listed in Mountain Time (UTC-07:00).

=== Draw 1 ===
Wednesday, February 7, 1:00 pm

Sheet A	1	2	3	4	5	6	7	8	9	10	Final
Ryan Jacques 🔨	0	0	1	0	1	2	2	0	0	0	6
Andrew Dunbar	1	3	0	1	0	0	0	1	0	1	7

Sheet B	1	2	3	4	5	6	7	8	9	10	Final
Johnson Tao	0	0	0	0	0	1	0	1	0	X	2
Daylan Vavrek 🔨	0	1	1	0	0	0	2	0	3	X	7

Sheet C	1	2	3	4	5	6	7	8	9	10	Final
Scott Webb 🔨	2	0	1	0	2	0	0	0	0	0	5
Jacob Libbus	0	0	0	3	0	0	1	1	1	3	9

Sheet D	1	2	3	4	5	6	7	8	9	10	Final
Cole Adams	1	0	0	0	0	0	3	0	0	X	4
Jared Jenkins 🔨	0	0	0	0	1	3	0	1	3	X	8

=== Draw 2 ===
Wednesday, February 7, 6:30 pm

Sheet A	1	2	3	4	5	6	7	8	9	10	Final
Ryan Parent 🔨	0	0	0	2	0	1	0	0	1	0	4
Daylan Vavrek	0	1	0	0	1	0	1	1	0	4	8

Sheet B	1	2	3	4	5	6	7	8	9	10	Final
Kevin Koe 🔨	1	1	0	1	0	2	0	0	3	X	8
Jacob Libbus	0	0	1	0	1	0	0	1	0	X	3

Sheet C	1	2	3	4	5	6	7	8	9	10	Final
Karsten Sturmay 🔨	2	0	0	1	1	0	2	0	4	X	10
Jared Jenkins	0	1	0	0	0	1	0	2	0	X	4

Sheet D	1	2	3	4	5	6	7	8	9	10	Final
Aaron Sluchinski	0	1	0	2	0	0	2	3	X	X	8
Andrew Dunbar 🔨	0	0	0	0	1	0	0	0	X	X	1

=== Draw 3 ===
Thursday, February 8, 9:00 am

Sheet A	1	2	3	4	5	6	7	8	9	10	Final
Aaron Sluchinski 🔨	0	0	0	1	0	0	1	0	X	X	2
Karsten Sturmay	2	1	1	0	1	0	0	3	X	X	8

Sheet D	1	2	3	4	5	6	7	8	9	10	Final
Kevin Koe	4	1	0	3	4	X	X	X	X	X	12
Daylan Vavrek 🔨	0	0	2	0	0	X	X	X	X	X	2

=== Draw 4 ===
Thursday, February 8, 2:00 pm

Sheet A	1	2	3	4	5	6	7	8	9	10	Final
Scott Webb	0	0	2	1	0	0	1	3	0	0	7
Ryan Parent 🔨	1	0	0	0	2	0	0	0	2	1	6

Sheet B	1	2	3	4	5	6	7	8	9	10	Final
Andrew Dunbar	0	0	2	0	3	0	0	2	1	0	8
Cole Adams 🔨	0	4	0	2	0	0	2	0	0	1	9

Sheet C	1	2	3	4	5	6	7	8	9	10	Final
Ryan Jacques	1	0	2	2	0	2	0	0	0	X	7
Jared Jenkins 🔨	0	1	0	0	1	0	1	1	1	X	5

Sheet D	1	2	3	4	5	6	7	8	9	10	11	Final
Johnson Tao	0	3	0	0	1	0	2	0	0	1	0	7
Jacob Libbus 🔨	1	0	1	1	0	2	0	1	1	0	1	8

=== Draw 5 ===
Thursday, February 8, 7:00 pm

Sheet A	1	2	3	4	5	6	7	8	9	10	Final
Scott Webb	0	0	0	0	1	0	1	0	X	X	2
Aaron Sluchinski 🔨	2	0	0	1	0	1	0	3	X	X	7

Sheet B	1	2	3	4	5	6	7	8	9	10	Final
Cole Adams 🔨	1	0	4	0	1	0	2	0	3	X	11
Daylan Vavrek	0	1	0	2	0	2	0	2	0	X	7

Sheet C	1	2	3	4	5	6	7	8	9	10	Final
Kevin Koe 🔨	1	1	0	0	0	0	2	0	1	X	5
Karsten Sturmay	0	0	0	0	0	1	0	0	0	X	1

Sheet D	1	2	3	4	5	6	7	8	9	10	Final
Ryan Jacques 🔨	0	2	0	4	0	4	0	3	X	X	13
Jacob Libbus	0	0	2	0	4	0	1	0	X	X	7

=== Draw 6 ===
Friday, February 9, 8:30 am

Sheet A	1	2	3	4	5	6	7	8	9	10	Final
Andrew Dunbar 🔨	0	0	1	0	2	0	2	0	0	X	5
Ryan Parent	0	0	0	3	0	3	0	2	2	X	10

Sheet C	1	2	3	4	5	6	7	8	9	10	Final
Daylan Vavrek	0	1	2	0	0	0	1	1	0	2	7
Johnson Tao 🔨	2	0	0	0	2	0	0	0	1	0	5

Sheet D	1	2	3	4	5	6	7	8	9	10	Final
Jared Jenkins 🔨	0	3	0	0	0	1	0	2	0	0	6
Scott Webb	2	0	0	3	0	0	1	0	0	2	8

=== Draw 7 ===
Friday, February 9, 1:00 pm

Sheet B	1	2	3	4	5	6	7	8	9	10	Final
Ryan Jacques	0	0	1	0	0	1	0	1	0	X	3
Karsten Sturmay 🔨	0	1	0	0	1	0	3	0	2	X	7

Sheet D	1	2	3	4	5	6	7	8	9	10	11	Final
Cole Adams	0	0	1	0	1	0	1	0	2	1	0	6
Aaron Sluchinski 🔨	0	2	0	2	0	1	0	1	0	0	2	8

=== Draw 8 ===
Friday, February 9, 5:00 pm

Sheet A	1	2	3	4	5	6	7	8	9	10	Final
Jacob Libbus 🔨	2	0	0	0	0	1	1	0	1	0	5
Cole Adams	0	0	1	1	0	0	0	2	0	2	6

Sheet B	1	2	3	4	5	6	7	8	9	10	11	Final
Scott Webb	0	0	2	0	1	0	0	2	0	1	0	6
Daylan Vavrek 🔨	0	2	0	0	0	1	0	0	3	0	2	8

Sheet C	1	2	3	4	5	6	7	8	9	10	Final
Aaron Sluchinski	0	0	0	2	0	0	1	2	0	2	7
Karsten Sturmay 🔨	0	1	1	0	0	1	0	0	3	0	6

Sheet D	1	2	3	4	5	6	7	8	9	10	Final
Ryan Parent	1	0	0	0	2	1	0	2	0	1	7
Ryan Jacques 🔨	0	1	0	1	0	0	2	0	2	0	6

=== Draw 9 ===
Saturday, February 10, 1:30 pm

Sheet C	1	2	3	4	5	6	7	8	9	10	Final
Ryan Parent 🔨	2	0	3	0	0	1	0	0	3	0	9
Cole Adams	0	4	0	2	1	0	1	1	0	1	10

Sheet D	1	2	3	4	5	6	7	8	9	10	Final
Daylan Vavrek	0	0	0	0	0	1	0	1	0	X	2
Karsten Sturmay 🔨	0	0	3	0	2	0	0	0	3	X	8

== Playoffs ==
Page playoff system
A	Kevin Koe	2
B	Aaron Sluchinski	6
C1	Cole Adams	2
C2	Karsten Sturmay	7

Semifinal
A	Kevin Koe	7
C2	Karsten Sturmay	6

Final
B	Aaron Sluchinski	6
A	Kevin Koe	3

=== A vs. B ===
Saturday, February 10, 6:30 pm

Sheet C	1	2	3	4	5	6	7	8	9	10	Final
Kevin Koe 🔨	2	0	0	0	0	0	0	0	0	0	2
Aaron Sluchinski	0	0	0	1	0	0	0	3	0	2	6

=== C1 vs. C2 ===
Saturday, February 10, 6:30 pm

Sheet B	1	2	3	4	5	6	7	8	9	10	Final
Cole Adams	0	1	0	0	1	0	0	0	X	X	2
Karsten Sturmay 🔨	2	0	0	2	0	0	2	1	X	X	7

=== Semifinal ===
Sunday, February 11, 10:00 am

Sheet D	1	2	3	4	5	6	7	8	9	10	Final
Kevin Koe 🔨	1	0	0	1	0	1	0	2	0	2	7
Karsten Sturmay	0	1	2	0	0	0	2	0	1	0	6

=== Final ===
Sunday, February 11, 3:00 pm

Sheet C	1	2	3	4	5	6	7	8	9	10	Final
Aaron Sluchinski 🔨	2	0	1	0	0	1	1	0	0	1	6
Kevin Koe	0	0	0	1	0	0	0	0	2	0	3

2024 Boston Pizza Cup

Aaron Sluchinski
1st Alberta Provincial Championship title
