= 2025 Tour Challenge =

Grand Slam of Curling event

2025 Co-op Tour Challenge
- Host city: Nisku, Alberta (Tier 1); Beaumont, Alberta (U25)
- Arena: Silent Ice Arena (Tier 1); Beaumont Curling Club (U25)
- Dates: October 14–19
- Men's winner: (Scotland) Team Mouat
- Curling club: Gogar Park CC, Edinburgh
- Skip: Bruce Mouat
- Third: Grant Hardie
- Second: Bobby Lammie
- Lead: Hammy McMillan Jr.
- Coach: Michael Goodfellow
- Finalist: (Manitoba) Matt Dunstone
- Women's winner: (Ontario) Team Homan
- Curling club: Ottawa CC, Ottawa
- Skip: Rachel Homan
- Third: Tracy Fleury
- Second: Emma Miskew
- Lead: Sarah Wilkes
- Alternate: Rachelle Brown
- Coach: Heather Nedohin
- Finalist: (Switzerland) Silvana Tirinzoni

The 2025 Co-op Tour Challenge was held from October 14 to 19 with the Tier 1 event taking place at the Silent Ice Arena in Nisku, Alberta, and the U25 event taking place at the Beaumont Curling Club in Beaumont, Alberta. It was the second Grand Slam event of the 2025–26 curling season. This season, Grand Slam of Curling decided to host both a U25 Jr. GSOC Tour Challenge men's and women's event, instead of a Tier 2 event as in previous seasons, to showcase the future of the sport and support the transition of teams from juniors to men's/women's play. The finals of the U25 event were also held at the Silent Ice Arena simultaneously with the men's and women's finals of the Tier 1 event.

== Qualification ==
For the Tier 1 event, the top 16 ranked men's and women's teams on the World Curling Federation's world team rankings as of September 15, 2025, qualified for the event. In the event that a team declines their invitation, the next-ranked team on the world team ranking is invited until the field is complete. However, for this year's Tour Challenge, the last remaining spot in the men's event was filled by a sponsor's exemption which was chosen by the Grand Slam of Curling. For the U25 event, teams were also selected by the Grand Slam of Curling.

=== Men ===
==== Tier 1 ====
Top world team ranking men's teams:

1. (Scotland) Bruce Mouat
2. (Switzerland) Yannick Schwaller
3. (Alberta) ~~Brad Jacobs~~
4. (Manitoba) Matt Dunstone
5. (Scotland) Ross Whyte
6. (Saskatchewan) Mike McEwen
7. (Switzerland) Marco Hösli
8. (Germany) Marc Muskatewitz
9. (Ontario) John Epping
10. (Newfoundland and Labrador) Brad Gushue
11. (United States) Korey Dropkin
12. (Italy) Joël Retornaz
13. (Sweden) Niklas Edin
14. (Saskatchewan) Rylan Kleiter
15. (China) ~~Xu Xiaoming~~
16. (Norway) ~~Magnus Ramsfjell~~
17. (Manitoba) Reid Carruthers
18. (United States) ~~John Shuster~~
19. (Scotland) Kyle Waddell

Sponsor's Exemption:

- (Alberta) Kevin Koe

==== U25 ====
Teams selected to compete were as follows:

- (Alberta) James Ballance
- (Scotland) James Craik
- (Alberta) Zach Davies
- (Saskatchewan) Dylan Derksen
- (Newfoundland and Labrador) Zach French
- (United States) Caden Hebert
- (Alberta) Peter Hlushak
- (Ontario) Daniel Hocevar
- (Alberta) Jacob Libbus
- (Nova Scotia) Calan MacIssac
- (Ontario) Tyler MacTavish
- (Japan) Takumi Maeda
- (Ontario) Jordan McNamara
- (Alberta) Johnson Tao
- (Alberta) Anders van Amsterdam
- (United States) Wesley Wendling

=== Women ===
==== Tier 1 ====
Top world team ranking women's teams:

1. (Ontario) Rachel Homan
2. (Switzerland) Silvana Tirinzoni
3. (Manitoba) Kerri Einarson
4. (Sweden) Anna Hasselborg
5. (South Korea) Kim Eun-jung
6. (South Korea) Gim Eun-ji
7. (Japan) Satsuki Fujisawa
8. (Japan) Sayaka Yoshimura
9. (South Korea) Ha Seung-youn
10. (Switzerland) Xenia Schwaller
11. (Japan) Momoha Tabata
12. (Sweden) Isabella Wranå
13. (China) ~~Wang Rui~~
14. (Alberta) Kayla Skrlik
15. (Nova Scotia) Christina Black
16. (Manitoba) Kaitlyn Lawes
17. (Italy) Stefania Constantini

==== U25 ====
Teams selected to compete were as follows:

- (Ontario) Emma Artichuk
- (Alberta) Keelie Duncan
- (Ontario) Katie Ford
- (Alberta) Serena Gray-Withers
- (British Columbia) Mahra Harris
- (Manitoba) Shaela Hayward
- (Scotland) Fay Henderson
- (United States) Allory Johnson
- (Alberta) Chloe Johnston
- (South Korea) Kang Bo-bae
- (Alberta) Lila Koe
- (Manitoba) Caitlyn McPherson
- (Japan) Yuina Miura
- (Alberta) Taylor Sanderman
- (United States) Subasthika Thangadurai
- (Alberta) Alena Yurko

== Format ==
The format remained the same as the first Grand Slam event of the season, the Masters, where teams were put into four pots based on their rankings, with teams then drafted into four pools of four teams. Each team plays the three other teams in their pool, with the Tier 1 teams also playing a cross over game. Crossover games were pre-determined based on the world rankings as of Sept. 29. Teams ranked No. 1–4 will play their crossover game against teams ranked No. 9–12 in the opposite pool. Teams ranked No. 5–8 will play their crossover game against teams ranked No. 13–16 in the opposite pool.

- Thinking time has been tightened to 30 minutes per team per game
- Games tied after eight ends go to a draw-to-the-button shootout rather than extra ends.
- Games will be worth three points in the standings, with three points being awarded to "regulation wins", two points for a shootout win, and one point for a shootout loss.
- For Tier 1 Games, teams are allowed to blank only one end per game. If a team blanks a second time at any point of the game, they will lose the hammer for the following end. This rule was set in order to "discourage teams from blanking multiple ends...and generate offence".

Following pool play, for Tier 1, the top 8 teams with the most points overall qualify for the playoffs. In the U25 event, the top two teams with the most points in each pool advance to the playoffs. If two teams are tied for a playoff spot in points, placement will be decided by head-to-head results.

== Men ==
=== Tier 1 ===
==== Teams ====
The teams are listed as follows:

Skip	Third	Second	Lead	Alternate	Locale
Reid Carruthers	B. J. Neufeld	Catlin Schneider	Connor Njegovan		Winnipeg, Manitoba
Korey Dropkin	Thomas Howell	Andrew Stopera	Mark Fenner		(United States) Duluth, Minnesota
Matt Dunstone	Colton Lott	E. J. Harnden	Ryan Harnden		Winnipeg, Manitoba
Niklas Edin	Oskar Eriksson	Rasmus Wranå	Christoffer Sundgren		Karlstad, Sweden
John Epping	Jacob Horgan	Tanner Horgan	Ian McMillan		Sudbury, Ontario
Brad Gushue	Mark Nichols	Brendan Bottcher	Geoff Walker		St. John's, Newfoundland and Labrador
Philipp Hösli (Fourth)	Marco Hösli (Skip)	Simon Gloor	Justin Hausherr		Glarus, Switzerland
Rylan Kleiter	Joshua Mattern	Matthew Hall	Trevor Johnson		Saskatoon, Saskatchewan
Kevin Koe	Tyler Tardi	Aaron Sluchinski	Karrick Martin		Calgary, Alberta
Mike McEwen	Colton Flasch	Kevin Marsh	Dan Marsh		Saskatoon, Saskatchewan
Bruce Mouat	Grant Hardie	Bobby Lammie	Hammy McMillan Jr.		Edinburgh, Scotland
Marc Muskatewitz	Benjamin Kapp	Felix Messenzehl	Johannes Scheuerl	Mario Trevisiol	Füssen, Germany
Joël Retornaz	Amos Mosaner	Sebastiano Arman	Mattia Giovanella		Trentino, Italy
Benoît Schwarz-van Berkel (Fourth)	Yannick Schwaller (Skip)	Sven Michel	Pablo Lachat-Couchepin		Geneva, Switzerland
Kyle Waddell	Mark Watt	Angus Bryce	Blair Haswell		Hamilton, Scotland
Ross Whyte	Robin Brydone	Craig Waddell (Note: Alternate Craig Waddell spared for Duncan McFadzean.)	Euan Kyle		Stirling, Scotland

==== Round robin standings ====
Final Round Robin Standings

Key
Teams to Playoffs
Teams to Tiebreakers

Pool A	W	SOW	SOL	L	PF	PA	Pts	LSD
(Scotland) Bruce Mouat	3	0	0	1	25	16	9	13.4
(Italy) Joël Retornaz	3	0	0	1	19	14	9	21.3
(Germany) Marc Muskatewitz	2	0	0	2	18	21	6	31.2
(Alberta) Kevin Koe	0	0	0	4	12	20	0	39.3

Pool B	W	SOW	SOL	L	PF	PA	Pts	LSD
(Sweden) Niklas Edin	2	1	0	1	19	18	8	14.2
(Switzerland) Yannick Schwaller	2	0	1	1	23	21	7	15.8
(Saskatchewan) Mike McEwen	2	0	0	2	26	20	6	90.3
(Manitoba) Reid Carruthers	2	0	0	2	21	23	6	139

Pool C	W	SOW	SOL	L	PF	PA	Pts	LSD
(Ontario) John Epping	4	0	0	0	24	14	12	4.6
(Scotland) Kyle Waddell	2	0	0	2	27	20	6	55.8
(Scotland) Ross Whyte	1	0	1	2	16	23	4	12.1
(United States) Korey Dropkin	0	1	0	3	16	29	2	71.5

Pool D	W	SOW	SOL	L	PF	PA	Pts	LSD
(Manitoba) Matt Dunstone	3	0	0	1	26	17	9	238.5
(Newfoundland and Labrador) Brad Gushue	2	0	0	2	25	22	6	1.7
(Switzerland) Marco Hösli	1	0	0	3	16	26	3	24
(Saskatchewan) Rylan Kleiter	1	0	0	3	17	26	3	93

==== Round robin results ====
All draw times are listed in Mountain Time (UTC−06:00).

===== Draw 1 =====
Tuesday, October 14, 8:00 am

Sheet C	1	2	3	4	5	6	7	8	Final
(Manitoba) Matt Dunstone 🔨	1	0	0	3	2	0	2	X	8
(Saskatchewan) Rylan Kleiter	0	0	1	0	0	2	0	X	3

Sheet D	1	2	3	4	5	6	7	8	Final
(Germany) Marc Muskatewitz 🔨	2	0	1	1	0	2	0	0	6
(Italy) Joël Retornaz	0	1	0	0	1	0	2	1	5

===== Draw 2 =====
Tuesday, October 14, 11:30 am

Sheet C	1	2	3	4	5	6	7	8	Final
(Switzerland) Yannick Schwaller	0	0	0	2	0	2	1	0	5
(Manitoba) Reid Carruthers 🔨	0	1	2	0	1	0	0	2	6

Sheet D	1	2	3	4	5	6	7	8	Final
(Scotland) Ross Whyte 🔨	2	0	2	0	0	1	0	2	7
(Scotland) Kyle Waddell	0	2	0	2	1	0	1	0	6

===== Draw 3 =====
Tuesday, October 14, 3:00 pm

Sheet C	1	2	3	4	5	6	7	8	Final
(Saskatchewan) Mike McEwen	0	2	0	1	0	1	0	X	4
(Sweden) Niklas Edin 🔨	2	0	2	0	1	0	1	X	6

Sheet D	1	2	3	4	5	6	7	8	Final
(Ontario) John Epping 🔨	1	1	0	1	0	3	0	X	6
(United States) Korey Dropkin	0	0	2	0	1	0	1	X	4

===== Draw 4 =====
Tuesday, October 14, 6:30 pm

Sheet C	1	2	3	4	5	6	7	8	Final
(Newfoundland and Labrador) Brad Gushue 🔨	1	0	2	0	1	0	3	X	7
(Switzerland) Marco Hösli	0	2	0	1	0	1	0	X	4

Sheet D	1	2	3	4	5	6	7	8	Final
(Scotland) Bruce Mouat 🔨	1	0	2	0	0	2	0	1	6
(Alberta) Kevin Koe	0	1	0	0	2	0	1	0	4

===== Draw 5 =====
Wednesday, October 15, 8:30 am

Sheet C	1	2	3	4	5	6	7	8	Final
(United States) Korey Dropkin	0	0	2	0	0	X	X	X	2
(Scotland) Kyle Waddell 🔨	2	1	0	2	4	X	X	X	9

Sheet D	1	2	3	4	5	6	7	8	Final
(Sweden) Niklas Edin 🔨	1	0	1	0	1	0	0	2	5
(Manitoba) Reid Carruthers	0	1	0	1	0	1	1	0	4

===== Draw 6 =====
Wednesday, October 15, 12:00 pm

Sheet C	1	2	3	4	5	6	7	8	Final
(Scotland) Bruce Mouat 🔨	2	0	3	1	1	0	X	X	7
(Germany) Marc Muskatewitz	0	2	0	0	0	1	X	X	3

Sheet D	1	2	3	4	5	6	7	8	Final
(Manitoba) Matt Dunstone	0	1	0	1	0	1	1	3	7
(Switzerland) Marco Hösli 🔨	1	0	1	0	0	0	0	0	2

===== Draw 7 =====
Wednesday, October 15, 4:00 pm

Sheet C	1	2	3	4	5	6	7	8	Final
(Italy) Joël Retornaz 🔨	0	2	0	1	0	1	0	X	4
(Alberta) Kevin Koe	0	0	0	0	1	0	1	X	2

Sheet D	1	2	3	4	5	6	7	8	Final
(Newfoundland and Labrador) Brad Gushue 🔨	1	1	0	0	2	0	1	0	5
(Saskatchewan) Rylan Kleiter	0	0	2	1	0	2	0	1	6

===== Draw 8 =====
Wednesday, October 15, 8:00 pm

Sheet C	1	2	3	4	5	6	7	8	Final
(Scotland) Ross Whyte	0	0	0	0	1	X	X	X	1
(Ontario) John Epping 🔨	2	1	1	2	0	X	X	X	6

Sheet D	1	2	3	4	5	6	7	8	Final
(Switzerland) Yannick Schwaller 🔨	1	0	1	0	2	0	3	0	7
(Saskatchewan) Mike McEwen	0	2	0	1	0	1	0	2	6

===== Draw 9 =====
Thursday, October 16, 8:30 am

Sheet A	1	2	3	4	5	6	7	8	Final
(Switzerland) Marco Hösli	0	1	0	1	0	2	0	0	4
(Manitoba) Reid Carruthers 🔨	2	0	1	0	1	0	2	2	8

Sheet B	1	2	3	4	5	6	7	8	Final
(Germany) Marc Muskatewitz 🔨	0	1	1	0	1	0	2	0	5
(Scotland) Kyle Waddell	1	0	0	4	0	2	0	1	8

===== Draw 10 =====
Thursday, October 16, 12:00 pm

Sheet A	1	2	3	4	5	6	7	8	Final
(Saskatchewan) Mike McEwen 🔨	1	0	0	3	0	2	0	1	7
(Saskatchewan) Rylan Kleiter	0	0	1	0	2	0	1	0	4

Sheet B	1	2	3	4	5	6	7	8	Final
(Scotland) Bruce Mouat 🔨	1	0	2	0	2	0	4	X	9
(United States) Korey Dropkin	0	1	0	2	0	1	0	X	4

===== Draw 11 =====
Thursday, October 16, 4:00 pm

Sheet A	1	2	3	4	5	6	7	8	Final
(Manitoba) Matt Dunstone	0	1	1	0	2	2	0	X	6
(Sweden) Niklas Edin 🔨	0	0	0	2	0	0	1	X	3

Sheet B	1	2	3	4	5	6	7	8	Final
(Scotland) Ross Whyte	0	0	1	0	1	0	1	0	3
(Italy) Joël Retornaz 🔨	0	1	0	2	0	1	0	1	5

===== Draw 12 =====
Thursday, October 16, 8:00 pm

Sheet A	1	2	3	4	5	6	7	8	Final
(Switzerland) Yannick Schwaller	0	1	0	0	5	0	1	X	7
(Newfoundland and Labrador) Brad Gushue 🔨	1	0	0	1	0	2	0	X	4

Sheet B	1	2	3	4	5	6	7	8	Final
(Ontario) John Epping	1	0	2	0	0	1	0	2	6
(Alberta) Kevin Koe 🔨	0	1	0	2	0	0	2	0	5

===== Draw 13 =====
Friday, October 17, 8:30 am

Sheet A	1	2	3	4	5	6	7	8	9	Final
(Scotland) Ross Whyte 🔨	1	0	2	0	1	0	0	1	0	5
(United States) Korey Dropkin	0	1	0	2	0	1	1	0	1	6

Sheet D	1	2	3	4	5	6	7	8	Final
(Switzerland) Marco Hösli 🔨	2	1	0	2	0	1	0	X	6
(Saskatchewan) Rylan Kleiter	0	0	1	0	1	0	2	X	4

===== Draw 14 =====
Friday, October 17, 12:00 pm

Sheet B	1	2	3	4	5	6	7	8	9	Final
(Switzerland) Yannick Schwaller 🔨	1	1	0	0	1	0	0	1	0	4
(Sweden) Niklas Edin	0	0	1	1	0	1	1	0	1	5

Sheet C	1	2	3	4	5	6	7	8	Final
(Saskatchewan) Mike McEwen	0	5	0	4	0	X	X	X	9
(Manitoba) Reid Carruthers 🔨	1	0	1	0	1	X	X	X	3

===== Draw 15 =====
Friday, October 17, 4:00 pm

Sheet A	1	2	3	4	5	6	7	8	Final
(Ontario) John Epping 🔨	0	1	0	2	0	2	0	1	6
(Scotland) Kyle Waddell	0	0	2	0	2	0	0	0	4

Sheet D	1	2	3	4	5	6	7	8	Final
(Germany) Marc Muskatewitz	1	0	0	1	0	1	1	X	4
(Alberta) Kevin Koe 🔨	0	1	0	0	0	0	0	X	1

===== Draw 16 =====
Friday, October 17, 8:00 pm

Sheet C	1	2	3	4	5	6	7	8	Final
(Newfoundland and Labrador) Brad Gushue 🔨	2	0	2	0	1	0	4	X	9
(Manitoba) Matt Dunstone	0	2	0	1	0	2	0	X	5

Sheet D	1	2	3	4	5	6	7	8	Final
(Scotland) Bruce Mouat 🔨	1	0	1	0	1	0	0	X	3
(Italy) Joël Retornaz	0	1	0	2	0	1	1	X	5

==== Tiebreakers ====
Saturday, October 18, 8:30 am

Sheet A	1	2	3	4	5	6	7	8	Final
(Newfoundland and Labrador) Brad Gushue	1	0	2	0	1	0	2	1	7
(Saskatchewan) Mike McEwen 🔨	0	2	0	1	0	1	0	0	4

Sheet C	1	2	3	4	5	6	7	8	9	Final
(Germany) Marc Muskatewitz 🔨	0	2	0	1	0	2	1	1	0	7
(Scotland) Kyle Waddell	2	0	3	0	2	0	0	0	1	8

==== Playoffs ====
Quarterfinals
1	(Ontario) John Epping	6
8	(Scotland) Kyle Waddell	5
4	(Manitoba) Matt Dunstone	7
5	(Sweden) Niklas Edin	2
2	(Scotland) Bruce Mouat	9
7	(Newfoundland and Labrador) Brad Gushue	2
3	(Italy) Joël Retornaz	5
6	(Switzerland) Yannick Schwaller	2

Semifinals
1	(Ontario) John Epping	5
4	(Manitoba) Matt Dunstone	6
2	(Scotland) Bruce Mouat	5
3	(Italy) Joël Retornaz	2

Final
4	(Manitoba) Matt Dunstone	2
2	(Scotland) Bruce Mouat	5

===== Quarterfinals =====
Saturday, October 18, 4:00 pm

Sheet A	1	2	3	4	5	6	7	8	Final
(Manitoba) Matt Dunstone 🔨	2	1	0	2	0	2	X	X	7
(Sweden) Niklas Edin	0	0	1	0	1	0	X	X	2

Sheet B	1	2	3	4	5	6	7	8	Final
(Scotland) Bruce Mouat 🔨	2	1	0	2	0	4	X	X	9
(Newfoundland and Labrador) Brad Gushue	0	0	1	0	1	0	X	X	2

Sheet C	1	2	3	4	5	6	7	8	Final
(Italy) Joël Retornaz 🔨	0	1	0	1	0	0	3	X	5
(Switzerland) Yannick Schwaller	0	0	1	0	0	1	0	X	2

Sheet D	1	2	3	4	5	6	7	8	Final
(Ontario) John Epping 🔨	1	1	0	1	0	2	0	1	6
(Scotland) Kyle Waddell	0	0	2	0	2	0	1	0	5

===== Semifinals =====
Saturday, October 18, 8:00 pm

Sheet A	1	2	3	4	5	6	7	8	Final
(Scotland) Bruce Mouat 🔨	1	0	1	0	0	1	1	1	5
(Italy) Joël Retornaz	0	1	0	1	0	0	0	0	2

Sheet C	1	2	3	4	5	6	7	8	Final
(Ontario) John Epping 🔨	1	0	1	0	2	0	1	0	5
(Manitoba) Matt Dunstone	0	2	0	1	0	1	0	2	6

===== Final =====
Sunday, October 19, 2:30 pm

Sheet B	1	2	3	4	5	6	7	8	Final
(Manitoba) Matt Dunstone	0	1	0	0	0	0	1	X	2
(Scotland) Bruce Mouat 🔨	2	0	0	2	1	0	0	X	5

==== Player percentages ====
Final Round Robin Percentages

Leads	%
(Saskatchewan) Trevor Johnson	94
(Scotland) Euan Kyle	93
(Italy) Mattia Giovanella	92
(Manitoba) Ryan Harnden	90
(Saskatchewan) Dan Marsh	89
(Switzerland) Justin Hausherr	89
(Switzerland) Pablo Lachat-Couchepin	89
(Ontario) Ian McMillan	88
(Sweden) Christoffer Sundgren	87
(Alberta) Karrick Martin	87
(Manitoba) Connor Njegovan	86
(United States) Mark Fenner	86
(Newfoundland and Labrador) Geoff Walker	86
(Scotland) Hammy McMillan Jr.	85
(Germany) Johannes Scheuerl	83
(Scotland) Blair Haswell	79

Seconds	%
(Scotland) Bobby Lammie	84
(Sweden) Rasmus Wranå	83
(Saskatchewan) Matthew Hall	83
(Manitoba) E. J. Harnden	83
(Saskatchewan) Kevin Marsh	83
(Switzerland) Sven Michel	83
(United States) Andrew Stopera	82
(Italy) Sebastiano Arman	81
(Scotland) Craig Waddell	80
(Switzerland) Simon Gloor	80
(Alberta) Aaron Sluchinski	80
(Scotland) Angus Bryce	80
(Newfoundland and Labrador) Brendan Bottcher	79
(Germany) Felix Messenzehl	77
(Manitoba) Catlin Schneider	75
(Ontario) Tanner Horgan	74

Thirds	%
(Switzerland) Marco Hösli (Skip)	83
(Sweden) Oskar Eriksson	82
(Italy) Amos Mosaner	82
(Saskatchewan) Joshua Mattern	81
(Switzerland) Yannick Schwaller (Skip)	81
(Scotland) Robin Brydone	80
(Germany) Benjamin Kapp	80
(Scotland) Grant Hardie	79
(Manitoba) Colton Lott	78
(Saskatchewan) Colton Flasch	78
(Scotland) Mark Watt	77
(Ontario) Jacob Horgan	76
(Newfoundland and Labrador) Mark Nichols	75
(United States) Thomas Howell	74
(Manitoba) B. J. Neufeld	72
(Alberta) Tyler Tardi	72

Skips	%
(Italy) Joël Retornaz	89
(Manitoba) Matt Dunstone	88
(Scotland) Bruce Mouat	87
(Switzerland) Benoît Schwarz-van Berkel (Fourth)	79
(Ontario) John Epping	79
(Manitoba) Reid Carruthers	79
(Newfoundland and Labrador) Brad Gushue	78
(United States) Korey Dropkin	78
(Scotland) Kyle Waddell	78
(Germany) Marc Muskatewitz	77
(Sweden) Niklas Edin	76
(Switzerland) Philipp Hösli (Fourth)	76
(Saskatchewan) Mike McEwen	74
(Scotland) Ross Whyte	73
(Saskatchewan) Rylan Kleiter	71
(Alberta) Kevin Koe	59

=== U25 Jr. GSOC Tour Challenge ===
==== Teams ====
The teams are listed as follows:

Skip	Third	Second	Lead	Locale
James Ballance	Kolby MacDonald	Michael Keenan	Oliver Burton	Okotoks, Alberta
James Craik	Fraser Swanston	Jake MacDonald	Rory Macnair	Forfar, Scotland
Zach Davies	Ronan Peterson	Will Butler	Adam Naugler	Edmonton, Alberta
Dylan Derksen	Logan Sawicki	Tyler Derksen	Gavin Martens	Martensville, Saskatchewan
Zach French	Lucas Cole	Lucas Wall	Noah Warren-Pitre	St. John's, Newfoundland and Labrador
Caden Hebert	Jackson Bestland	Benji Paral	Jack Wendtland	(United States) Eau Claire, Wisconsin
Peter Hlushak	Sahil Dalrymple	Varyk Doepker	Lucas Sawiak	Edmonton, Alberta
Daniel Hocevar	Zander Elmes	Joel Matthews	Daniel Del Conte	Toronto, Ontario
Jacob Libbus	Nathan Molberg	Zachary Pawliuk	Michael Hendricks	Edmonton, Alberta
Calan MacIsaac	Nathan Gray	Owain Fisher	Chris McCurdy	Truro, Nova Scotia
Tyler MacTavish	Owen Nicholls	Nathan Kim	Nate Thomas	Kitchener-Waterloo, Ontario
Takumi Maeda	Hiroki Maeda	Uryu Kamikawa	Gakuto Tokoro	Kitami, Japan
Jordan McNamara	Colton Daly	Jacob Clarke	Brendan Laframboise	Ottawa, Ontario
Johnson Tao	Kenan Wipf	Benjamin Morin	Andrew Nowell	Edmonton, Alberta
Anders van Amsterdam	Tyler Brodt	Matthew Hannah	Nolan Peters	Edmonton, Alberta
Wesley Wendling	Ethan Sampson	Jacob Zeman	Marius Kleinas	(United States) Chaska, Minnesota

==== Round robin standings ====
Final Round Robin Standings

Key
Teams to Playoffs

Pool A	W	SOW	SOL	L	PF	PA	Pts
(Japan) Takumi Maeda	3	0	0	0	16	10	9
(Alberta) Jacob Libbus	2	0	0	1	17	11	6
(Alberta) Peter Hlushak	1	0	0	2	9	14	3
(Alberta) James Ballance	0	0	0	3	8	15	0

Pool B	W	SOW	SOL	L	PF	PA	Pts
(Alberta) Johnson Tao	3	0	0	0	19	11	9
(Scotland) James Craik	2	0	0	1	19	12	6
(Ontario) Tyler MacTavish	1	0	0	2	15	14	3
(Alberta) Anders van Amsterdam	0	0	0	3	8	24	0

Pool C	W	SOW	SOL	L	PF	PA	Pts
(Ontario) Daniel Hocevar	3	0	0	0	25	3	9
(Nova Scotia) Calan MacIsaac	2	0	0	1	16	10	6
(United States) Wesley Wendling	1	0	0	2	14	20	3
(Newfoundland and Labrador) Zach French	0	0	0	3	9	31	0

Pool D	W	SOW	SOL	L	PF	PA	Pts
(Ontario) Jordan McNamara	2	0	0	1	17	12	6
(Saskatchewan) Dylan Derksen	2	0	0	1	19	13	6
(Alberta) Zach Davies	1	0	0	2	9	15	3
(United States) Caden Hebert	1	0	0	2	10	15	3

==== Round robin results ====
All draw times are listed in Mountain Time (UTC−06:00).

===== Draw 1 =====
Thursday, October 16, 8:00 am

Sheet 1	1	2	3	4	5	6	7	8	Final
(Japan) Takumi Maeda 🔨	0	0	0	0	1	0	3	1	5
(Alberta) Peter Hlushak	0	1	1	0	0	2	0	0	4

Sheet 2	1	2	3	4	5	6	7	8	Final
(Alberta) Jacob Libbus 🔨	1	3	0	2	0	1	X	X	7
(Alberta) James Ballance	0	0	2	0	1	0	X	X	3

Sheet 3	1	2	3	4	5	6	7	8	Final
(Scotland) James Craik	0	0	3	0	3	3	X	X	9
(Alberta) Anders van Amsterdam 🔨	0	2	0	1	0	0	X	X	3

Sheet 4	1	2	3	4	5	6	7	8	Final
(Ontario) Tyler MacTavish	0	0	0	2	0	2	0	X	4
(Alberta) Johnson Tao 🔨	0	3	0	0	2	0	1	X	6

Sheet 5	1	2	3	4	5	6	7	8	Final
(United States) Wesley Wendling	0	3	0	4	1	0	2	X	10
(Newfoundland and Labrador) Zach French 🔨	1	0	2	0	0	2	0	X	5

Sheet 6	1	2	3	4	5	6	7	8	Final
(Ontario) Daniel Hocevar	1	0	1	1	1	1	X	X	5
(Nova Scotia) Calan MacIsaac 🔨	0	0	0	0	0	0	X	X	0

===== Draw 2 =====
Thursday, October 16, 12:00 pm

Sheet 5	1	2	3	4	5	6	7	8	Final
(Saskatchewan) Dylan Derksen	0	0	2	1	0	1	X	X	4
(Ontario) Jordan McNamara 🔨	2	4	0	0	2	0	X	X	8

Sheet 6	1	2	3	4	5	6	7	8	Final
(Alberta) Zach Davies	0	1	1	1	0	0	1	X	4
(United States) Caden Hebert 🔨	1	0	0	0	0	1	0	X	2

===== Draw 3 =====
Thursday, October 16, 4:00 pm

Sheet 5	1	2	3	4	5	6	7	8	Final
(Scotland) James Craik	0	1	0	1	0	2	0	1	5
(Alberta) Johnson Tao 🔨	2	0	1	0	2	0	1	0	6

Sheet 6	1	2	3	4	5	6	7	8	Final
(Ontario) Tyler MacTavish	0	3	0	4	1	0	X	X	8
(Alberta) Anders van Amsterdam 🔨	1	0	1	0	0	1	X	X	3

===== Draw 4 =====
Thursday, October 16, 8:00 pm

Sheet 5	1	2	3	4	5	6	7	8	Final
(Japan) Takumi Maeda 🔨	1	1	0	0	2	0	0	X	4
(Alberta) James Ballance	0	0	1	1	0	1	0	X	3

Sheet 6	1	2	3	4	5	6	7	8	Final
(Alberta) Jacob Libbus 🔨	2	0	0	3	1	1	X	X	7
(Alberta) Peter Hlushak	0	0	1	0	0	0	X	X	1

===== Draw 5 =====
Friday, October 17, 8:00 am

Sheet 3	1	2	3	4	5	6	7	8	Final
(Saskatchewan) Dylan Derksen	0	2	0	3	0	1	1	X	7
(United States) Caden Hebert 🔨	1	0	1	0	1	0	0	X	3

Sheet 4	1	2	3	4	5	6	7	8	Final
(Alberta) Zach Davies	0	0	0	0	1	1	1	0	3
(Ontario) Jordan McNamara 🔨	1	0	1	2	0	0	0	1	5

===== Draw 6 =====
Friday, October 17, 12:00 pm

Sheet 1	1	2	3	4	5	6	7	8	Final
(United States) Wesley Wendling 🔨	0	1	0	0	0	0	X	X	1
(Ontario) Daniel Hocevar	0	0	3	1	2	3	X	X	9

Sheet 2	1	2	3	4	5	6	7	8	Final
(Nova Scotia) Calan MacIsaac 🔨	5	1	0	1	3	X	X	X	10
(Newfoundland and Labrador) Zach French	0	0	2	0	0	X	X	X	2

===== Draw 8 =====
Friday, October 17, 8:00 pm

Sheet 1	1	2	3	4	5	6	7	8	Final
(Scotland) James Craik 🔨	1	0	1	0	2	0	0	1	5
(Ontario) Tyler MacTavish	0	0	0	1	0	0	2	0	3

Sheet 2	1	2	3	4	5	6	7	8	Final
(Alberta) Johnson Tao 🔨	2	2	1	0	2	0	X	X	7
(Alberta) Anders van Amsterdam	0	0	0	1	0	1	X	X	2

Sheet 3	1	2	3	4	5	6	7	8	Final
(Japan) Takumi Maeda 🔨	4	0	0	1	0	0	2	X	7
(Alberta) Jacob Libbus	0	0	1	0	2	0	0	X	3

Sheet 4	1	2	3	4	5	6	7	8	Final
(Alberta) James Ballance	0	0	1	0	0	1	0	0	2
(Alberta) Peter Hlushak 🔨	0	2	0	0	0	0	0	2	4

===== Draw 9 =====
Saturday, October 18, 8:00 am

Sheet 1	1	2	3	4	5	6	7	8	Final
(Saskatchewan) Dylan Derksen	1	3	0	2	2	X	X	X	8
(Alberta) Zach Davies 🔨	0	0	2	0	0	X	X	X	2

Sheet 2	1	2	3	4	5	6	7	8	Final
(United States) Caden Hebert	0	1	1	1	0	0	2	0	5
(Ontario) Jordan McNamara 🔨	0	0	0	0	1	1	0	2	4

Sheet 3	1	2	3	4	5	6	7	8	Final
(United States) Wesley Wendling	0	1	0	1	0	1	0	X	3
(Nova Scotia) Calan MacIsaac 🔨	3	0	1	0	0	0	2	X	6

Sheet 6	1	2	3	4	5	6	7	8	Final
(Ontario) Daniel Hocevar	2	0	3	0	4	2	X	X	11
(Newfoundland and Labrador) Zach French 🔨	0	1	0	1	0	0	X	X	2

==== Playoffs ====
Quarterfinals
A1	(Japan) Takumi Maeda	10
D2	(Saskatchewan) Dylan Derksen	4
B1	(Alberta) Johnson Tao	7
C2	(Nova Scotia) Calan MacIsaac	2
C1	(Ontario) Daniel Hocevar	3
B2	(Scotland) James Craik	5
D1	(Ontario) Jordan McNamara	9
A2	(Alberta) Jacob Libbus	3

Semifinals
A1	(Japan) Takumi Maeda	6
B1	(Alberta) Johnson Tao	3
B2	(Scotland) James Craik	6
D1	(Ontario) Jordan McNamara	7

Final
A1	(Japan) Takumi Maeda	8
D1	(Ontario) Jordan McNamara	3

===== Quarterfinals =====
Saturday, October 18, 4:00 pm

Sheet 3	1	2	3	4	5	6	7	8	Final
(Alberta) Johnson Tao 🔨	1	0	2	3	1	0	X	X	7
(Nova Scotia) Calan MacIsaac	0	1	0	0	0	1	X	X	2

Sheet 4	1	2	3	4	5	6	7	8	Final
(Ontario) Daniel Hocevar 🔨	1	0	0	1	0	0	1	0	3
(Scotland) James Craik	0	2	0	0	2	0	0	1	5

Saturday, October 18, 8:00 pm

Sheet 2	1	2	3	4	5	6	7	8	Final
(Japan) Takumi Maeda 🔨	3	0	3	0	0	4	X	X	10
(Saskatchewan) Dylan Derksen	0	1	0	2	1	0	X	X	4

Sheet 5	1	2	3	4	5	6	7	8	Final
(Ontario) Jordan McNamara 🔨	0	4	0	0	0	5	X	X	9
(Alberta) Jacob Libbus	1	0	0	1	1	0	X	X	3

===== Semifinals =====
Sunday, October 19, 8:00 am

Sheet 2	1	2	3	4	5	6	7	8	Final
(Japan) Takumi Maeda 🔨	0	1	0	0	0	3	2	X	6
(Alberta) Johnson Tao	0	0	0	1	2	0	0	X	3

Sheet 4	1	2	3	4	5	6	7	8	9	Final
(Scotland) James Craik 🔨	2	0	0	1	0	1	0	2	0	6
(Ontario) Jordan McNamara	0	2	0	0	2	0	2	0	1	7

===== Final =====
Sunday, October 19, 2:30 pm

Sheet C	1	2	3	4	5	6	7	8	Final
(Japan) Takumi Maeda 🔨	0	1	2	1	1	0	3	X	8
(Ontario) Jordan McNamara	2	0	0	0	0	1	0	X	3

== Women ==
=== Tier 1 ===
==== Teams ====
The teams are listed as follows:

Skip	Third	Second	Lead	Alternate	Locale
Christina Black	Jill Brothers	Marlee Powers (Note: Alternate Marlee Powers played second, replacing Jenn Baxter.)	Karlee Everist		Halifax, Nova Scotia
Stefania Constantini	Giulia Zardini Lacedelli	Elena Mathis	Marta Lo Deserto	Angela Romei	Cortina d'Ampezzo, Italy
Kerri Einarson	Val Sweeting	Shannon Birchard	Karlee Burgess	Krysten Karwacki	Gimli, Manitoba
Satsuki Fujisawa	Chinami Yoshida	Yumi Suzuki	Yurika Yoshida		Kitami, Japan
Gim Eun-ji	Kim Min-ji	Kim Su-ji	Seol Ye-eun	Seol Ye-ji	Uijeongbu, South Korea
Ha Seung-youn	Kim Hye-rin	Yang Tae-i	Kim Su-jin	Park Seo-jin	Chuncheon, South Korea
Anna Hasselborg	Sara McManus	Agnes Knochenhauer	Sofia Scharback	Johanna Heldin	Sundbyberg, Sweden
Rachel Homan	Tracy Fleury	Emma Miskew	Sarah Wilkes	Rachelle Brown	Ottawa, Ontario
Kim Eun-jung	Kim Kyeong-ae	Kim Cho-hi	Kim Yeong-mi (Note: Alternate Kim Yeong-mi played lead, replacing Kim Seon-yeong who was competing on the Ontario mixed doubles tour.)		Gangneung, South Korea
Kaitlyn Lawes (Fourth)	Selena Njegovan (Skip) (Note: Selena Njegovan skipped Team Lawes.)	Jocelyn Peterman	Kristin Gordon	Laura Walker	Winnipeg, Manitoba
Xenia Schwaller	Selina Gafner	Fabienne Rieder	Selina Rychiger		Zurich, Switzerland
Kayla Skrlik	Margot Flemming	Ashton Skrlik	Geri-Lynn Ramsay	Crystal Rumberg	Calgary, Alberta
Miku Nihira (Note: Miku Nihira skipped Team Tabata.)	Sae Yamamoto	Momoha Tabata (Note: Team Tabata changed their lineup for the event with fourth Momoha Tabata throwing second, second Sae Yamamoto throwing third and third Miku Nihira throwing fourth and continuing to call the game.)	Mikoto Nakajima		Sapporo, Japan
Alina Pätz (Fourth)	Silvana Tirinzoni (Skip)	Carole Howald	Selina Witschonke		Aarau, Switzerland
Isabella Wranå	Almida de Val	Maria Larsson	Linda Stenlund		Sundbyberg, Sweden
Sayaka Yoshimura	Kaho Onodera	Yuna Kotani	Anna Ohmiya	Mina Kobayashi	Sapporo, Japan

==== Round robin standings ====
Final Round Robin Standings

Key
Teams to Playoffs

Pool A	W	SOW	SOL	L	PF	PA	Pts	LSD
(Ontario) Rachel Homan	3	0	0	1	24	22	9	2.4
(Italy) Stefania Constantini	3	0	0	1	28	18	9	80.2
(Switzerland) Xenia Schwaller	3	0	0	1	21	20	9	214.2
(Japan) Sayaka Yoshimura	0	0	1	3	19	28	1	47.7

Pool B	W	SOW	SOL	L	PF	PA	Pts	LSD
(Switzerland) Silvana Tirinzoni	4	0	0	0	24	10	12	22.1
(Japan) Satsuki Fujisawa	2	0	0	2	20	21	6	46
(South Korea) Ha Seung-youn	2	0	0	2	18	24	6	75.2
(Alberta) Kayla Skrlik	0	0	0	4	15	30	0	144.6

Pool C	W	SOW	SOL	L	PF	PA	Pts	LSD
(South Korea) Gim Eun-ji	2	0	0	2	23	22	6	55
(Sweden) Isabella Wranå	2	0	0	2	27	22	6	70.9
(Manitoba) Team Lawes	1	1	0	2	25	26	5	52.1
(South Korea) Kim Eun-jung	1	0	0	3	20	29	3	82.5

Pool D	W	SOW	SOL	L	PF	PA	Pts	LSD
(Sweden) Anna Hasselborg	3	1	0	0	26	19	11	135.3
(Manitoba) Kerri Einarson	2	0	1	1	24	18	7	53
(Japan) Team Tabata	2	0	0	2	25	25	6	38.6
(Nova Scotia) Christina Black	0	0	0	4	18	30	0	88.6

==== Round robin results ====
All draw times are listed in Mountain Time (UTC−06:00).

===== Draw 1 =====
Tuesday, October 14, 8:00 am

Sheet A	1	2	3	4	5	6	7	8	Final
(South Korea) Kim Eun-jung 🔨	0	0	3	1	0	1	0	1	6
(Manitoba) Team Lawes	2	1	0	0	1	0	1	0	5

Sheet B	1	2	3	4	5	6	7	8	Final
(Sweden) Anna Hasselborg 🔨	3	0	1	0	2	0	1	1	8
(Japan) Team Tabata	0	2	0	2	0	2	0	0	6

===== Draw 2 =====
Tuesday, October 14, 11:30 am

Sheet A	1	2	3	4	5	6	7	8	Final
(Ontario) Rachel Homan 🔨	1	1	0	2	0	1	0	2	7
(Switzerland) Xenia Schwaller	0	0	2	0	1	0	2	0	5

Sheet B	1	2	3	4	5	6	7	8	Final
(Japan) Satsuki Fujisawa 🔨	3	0	2	1	1	0	X	X	7
(South Korea) Ha Seung-youn	0	1	0	0	0	1	X	X	2

===== Draw 3 =====
Tuesday, October 14, 3:00 pm

Sheet A	1	2	3	4	5	6	7	8	Final
(Japan) Sayaka Yoshimura 🔨	0	1	0	1	0	2	0	X	4
(Italy) Stefania Constantini	0	0	3	0	2	0	3	X	8

Sheet B	1	2	3	4	5	6	7	8	Final
(Switzerland) Silvana Tirinzoni 🔨	3	0	0	2	0	3	1	X	9
(Alberta) Kayla Skrlik	0	1	1	0	2	0	0	X	4

===== Draw 4 =====
Tuesday, October 14, 6:30 pm

Sheet A	1	2	3	4	5	6	7	8	Final
(South Korea) Gim Eun-ji 🔨	3	0	1	0	0	2	0	0	6
(Sweden) Isabella Wranå	0	1	0	2	1	0	0	1	5

Sheet B	1	2	3	4	5	6	7	8	Final
(Manitoba) Kerri Einarson	0	2	1	0	3	0	2	X	8
(Nova Scotia) Christina Black 🔨	1	0	0	1	0	0	0	X	2

===== Draw 5 =====
Wednesday, October 15, 8:30 am

Sheet A	1	2	3	4	5	6	7	8	Final
(Japan) Satsuki Fujisawa	2	0	0	1	1	2	0	0	6
(Alberta) Kayla Skrlik 🔨	0	1	1	0	0	0	2	1	5

Sheet B	1	2	3	4	5	6	7	8	Final
(Switzerland) Xenia Schwaller 🔨	0	1	0	2	0	1	0	1	5
(Japan) Sayaka Yoshimura	1	0	1	0	1	0	1	0	4

===== Draw 6 =====
Wednesday, October 15, 12:00 pm

Sheet A	1	2	3	4	5	6	7	8	Final
(Sweden) Anna Hasselborg	0	2	0	1	3	0	0	X	6
(Nova Scotia) Christina Black 🔨	1	0	2	0	0	0	1	X	4

Sheet B	1	2	3	4	5	6	7	8	Final
(South Korea) Gim Eun-ji	0	1	0	1	0	0	2	X	4
(Manitoba) Team Lawes 🔨	1	0	2	0	2	2	0	X	7

===== Draw 7 =====
Wednesday, October 15, 4:00 pm

Sheet A	1	2	3	4	5	6	7	8	Final
(Switzerland) Silvana Tirinzoni 🔨	2	0	3	2	2	X	X	X	9
(South Korea) Ha Seung-youn	0	2	0	0	0	X	X	X	2

Sheet B	1	2	3	4	5	6	7	8	Final
(South Korea) Kim Eun-jung	0	0	3	0	1	0	1	X	5
(Sweden) Isabella Wranå 🔨	3	2	0	1	0	2	0	X	8

===== Draw 8 =====
Wednesday, October 15, 8:00 pm

Sheet A	1	2	3	4	5	6	7	8	Final
(Manitoba) Kerri Einarson	1	0	0	1	0	1	0	0	3
(Japan) Team Tabata 🔨	0	1	1	0	1	0	0	4	7

Sheet B	1	2	3	4	5	6	7	8	Final
(Ontario) Rachel Homan 🔨	0	2	0	0	2	0	0	0	4
(Italy) Stefania Constantini	1	0	1	2	0	1	0	3	8

===== Draw 9 =====
Thursday, October 16, 8:30 am

Sheet C	1	2	3	4	5	6	7	8	Final
(South Korea) Gim Eun-ji 🔨	0	1	0	0	1	0	2	0	4
(Switzerland) Xenia Schwaller	1	0	0	1	0	2	0	1	5

Sheet D	1	2	3	4	5	6	7	8	Final
(South Korea) Ha Seung-youn	0	0	3	0	1	0	2	1	7
(Nova Scotia) Christina Black 🔨	2	1	0	1	0	1	0	0	5

===== Draw 10 =====
Thursday, October 16, 12:00 pm

Sheet C	1	2	3	4	5	6	7	8	Final
(South Korea) Kim Eun-jung 🔨	1	0	1	1	0	1	0	0	4
(Italy) Stefania Constantini	0	1	0	0	2	0	2	2	7

Sheet D	1	2	3	4	5	6	7	8	Final
(Switzerland) Silvana Tirinzoni 🔨	2	0	2	0	1	0	1	X	6
(Japan) Team Tabata	0	1	0	1	0	1	0	X	3

===== Draw 11 =====
Thursday, October 16, 4:00 pm

Sheet C	1	2	3	4	5	6	7	8	9	Final
(Japan) Sayaka Yoshimura	0	2	0	2	0	1	0	2	0	7
(Manitoba) Team Lawes 🔨	1	0	2	0	1	0	3	0	1	8

Sheet D	1	2	3	4	5	6	7	8	Final
(Manitoba) Kerri Einarson	2	1	0	2	0	3	X	X	8
(Alberta) Kayla Skrlik 🔨	0	0	1	0	2	0	X	X	3

===== Draw 12 =====
Thursday, October 16, 8:00 pm

Sheet C	1	2	3	4	5	6	7	8	Final
(Ontario) Rachel Homan 🔨	0	0	2	0	0	2	2	0	6
(Sweden) Isabella Wranå	0	1	0	1	2	0	0	1	5

Sheet D	1	2	3	4	5	6	7	8	Final
(Sweden) Anna Hasselborg 🔨	1	0	2	0	0	2	0	1	6
(Japan) Satsuki Fujisawa	0	2	0	0	1	0	1	0	4

===== Draw 13 =====
Friday, October 17, 8:30 am

Sheet B	1	2	3	4	5	6	7	8	Final
(South Korea) Ha Seung-youn 🔨	2	0	3	1	0	1	0	X	7
(Alberta) Kayla Skrlik	0	1	0	0	2	0	0	X	3

Sheet C	1	2	3	4	5	6	7	8	Final
(Japan) Team Tabata 🔨	0	2	0	4	0	3	0	X	9
(Nova Scotia) Christina Black	2	0	2	0	1	0	2	X	7

===== Draw 14 =====
Friday, October 17, 12:00 pm

Sheet A	1	2	3	4	5	6	7	8	Final
(South Korea) Gim Eun-ji 🔨	2	0	2	0	2	0	0	3	9
(South Korea) Kim Eun-jung	0	2	0	2	0	1	0	0	5

Sheet D	1	2	3	4	5	6	7	8	Final
(Switzerland) Xenia Schwaller	1	0	2	0	1	1	1	0	6
(Italy) Stefania Constantini 🔨	0	2	0	2	0	0	0	1	5

===== Draw 15 =====
Friday, October 17, 4:00 pm

Sheet B	1	2	3	4	5	6	7	8	9	Final
(Sweden) Anna Hasselborg	1	1	0	0	2	0	0	1	1	6
(Manitoba) Kerri Einarson 🔨	0	0	0	2	0	2	1	0	0	5

Sheet C	1	2	3	4	5	6	7	8	Final
(Switzerland) Silvana Tirinzoni	0	2	0	1	0	1	1	3	8
(Japan) Satsuki Fujisawa 🔨	1	0	1	0	1	0	0	0	3

===== Draw 16 =====
Friday, October 17, 8:00 pm

Sheet A	1	2	3	4	5	6	7	8	Final
(Sweden) Isabella Wranå	0	2	0	3	1	0	2	1	9
(Manitoba) Team Lawes 🔨	2	0	2	0	0	1	0	0	5

Sheet B	1	2	3	4	5	6	7	8	Final
(Ontario) Rachel Homan 🔨	1	0	1	0	3	1	0	1	7
(Japan) Sayaka Yoshimura	0	1	0	1	0	0	2	0	4

==== Tiebreakers ====
Saturday, October 18, 8:30 am

Sheet B	1	2	3	4	5	6	7	8	Final
(Japan) Satsuki Fujisawa 🔨	1	0	1	0	1	0	2	0	5
(South Korea) Gim Eun-ji	0	3	0	1	0	1	0	1	6

Sheet D	1	2	3	4	5	6	7	8	Final
(Japan) Team Tabata	0	0	1	0	1	0	0	1	3
(Sweden) Isabella Wranå 🔨	0	1	0	2	0	1	0	0	4

==== Playoffs ====
Quarterfinals
1	(Switzerland) Silvana Tirinzoni	9
8	(Sweden) Isabella Wranå	4
4	(Italy) Stefania Constantini	5
5	(Switzerland) Xenia Schwaller	6
2	(Sweden) Anna Hasselborg	6
7	(South Korea) Gim Eun-ji	4
3	(Ontario) Rachel Homan	9
6	(Manitoba) Kerri Einarson	3

Semifinals
1	(Switzerland) Silvana Tirinzoni	7
5	(Switzerland) Xenia Schwaller	3
2	(Sweden) Anna Hasselborg	4
3	(Ontario) Rachel Homan	5

Final
1	(Switzerland) Silvana Tirinzoni	2
3	(Ontario) Rachel Homan	8

===== Quarterfinals =====
Saturday, October 18, 12:00 pm

Sheet A	1	2	3	4	5	6	7	8	9	Final
(Italy) Stefania Constantini	0	0	1	0	3	0	0	1	0	5
(Switzerland) Xenia Schwaller 🔨	0	2	0	1	0	1	1	0	1	6

Sheet B	1	2	3	4	5	6	7	8	Final
(Switzerland) Silvana Tirinzoni 🔨	2	1	2	2	0	0	2	X	9
(Sweden) Isabella Wranå	0	0	0	0	3	1	0	X	4

Sheet C	1	2	3	4	5	6	7	8	Final
(Sweden) Anna Hasselborg 🔨	2	0	0	2	0	1	0	1	6
(South Korea) Gim Eun-ji	0	1	0	0	1	0	2	0	4

Sheet D	1	2	3	4	5	6	7	8	Final
(Ontario) Rachel Homan 🔨	2	0	2	1	0	2	2	X	9
(Manitoba) Kerri Einarson	0	1	0	0	2	0	0	X	3

===== Semifinals =====
Saturday, October 18, 8:00 pm

Sheet B	1	2	3	4	5	6	7	8	9	Final
(Sweden) Anna Hasselborg 🔨	0	1	0	1	0	1	0	1	0	4
(Ontario) Rachel Homan	0	0	1	0	2	0	1	0	1	5

Sheet D	1	2	3	4	5	6	7	8	Final
(Switzerland) Silvana Tirinzoni 🔨	1	1	0	1	0	1	0	3	7
(Switzerland) Xenia Schwaller	0	0	1	0	1	0	1	0	3

===== Final =====
Sunday, October 19, 10:00 am

Sheet C	1	2	3	4	5	6	7	8	Final
(Switzerland) Silvana Tirinzoni 🔨	0	1	1	0	0	0	X	X	2
(Ontario) Rachel Homan	4	0	0	1	1	2	X	X	8

==== Player percentages ====
Final Round Robin Percentages

Leads	%
(Switzerland) Selina Witschonke	89
(Sweden) Linda Stenlund	88
(South Korea) Kim Su-jin	88
(Japan) Mikoto Nakajima	87
(Alberta) Geri-Lynn Ramsay	85
(Italy) Marta Lo Deserto	85
(South Korea) Kim Yeong-mi	84
(Manitoba) Karlee Burgess	83
(Switzerland) Selina Rychiger	83
(Ontario) Sarah Wilkes	82
(Nova Scotia) Karlee Everist	82
(South Korea) Seol Ye-eun	80
(Japan) Anna Ohmiya	79
(Japan) Yurika Yoshida	78
(Manitoba) Kristin Gordon	78
(Sweden) Sofia Scharback	76

Seconds	%
(Switzerland) Fabienne Rieder	81
(Switzerland) Carole Howald	80
(South Korea) Kim Su-ji	80
(Sweden) Agnes Knochenhauer	79
(South Korea) Kim Cho-hi	78
(Japan) Momoha Tabata	76
(Italy) Elena Mathis	75
(Nova Scotia) Marlee Powers	73
(Sweden) Maria Larsson	72
(South Korea) Yang Tae-i	72
(Ontario) Emma Miskew	72
(Manitoba) Jocelyn Peterman	70
(Japan) Yumi Suzuki	70
(Japan) Yuna Kotani	69
(Manitoba) Shannon Birchard	68
(Alberta) Ashton Skrlik	67

Thirds	%
(Sweden) Sara McManus	83
(Switzerland) Silvana Tirinzoni (Skip)	82
(Switzerland) Selina Gafner	81
(South Korea) Kim Min-ji	79
(Ontario) Tracy Fleury	77
(Italy) Giulia Zardini Lacedelli	77
(Sweden) Almida de Val	76
(Japan) Chinami Yoshida	74
(South Korea) Kim Hye-rin	73
(Japan) Sae Yamamoto	72
(South Korea) Kim Kyeong-ae	72
(Manitoba) Val Sweeting	70
(Nova Scotia) Jill Brothers	68
(Manitoba) Selena Njegovan (Skip)	66
(Japan) Kaho Onodera	57
(Alberta) Margot Flemming	51

Skips	%
(Sweden) Anna Hasselborg	85
(Ontario) Rachel Homan	81
(Switzerland) Alina Pätz (Fourth)	80
(Japan) Miku Nihira	76
(Switzerland) Xenia Schwaller	76
(South Korea) Gim Eun-ji	75
(Manitoba) Kerri Einarson	74
(Sweden) Isabella Wranå	72
(Japan) Satsuki Fujisawa	72
(South Korea) Kim Eun-jung	71
(South Korea) Ha Seung-youn	70
(Italy) Stefania Constantini	70
(Nova Scotia) Christina Black	69
(Alberta) Kayla Skrlik	62
(Manitoba) Kaitlyn Lawes (Fourth)	62
(Japan) Sayaka Yoshimura	56

=== U25 Jr GSOC Tour Challenge ===
==== Teams ====
The teams are listed as follows:

Skip	Third	Second	Lead	Alternate	Locale
Emma Artichuk	Jamie Smith	Evelyn Robert	Lauren Rajala		Waterloo, Ontario
Keelie Duncan	Ava Koe	Elizabeth Morgan	Carley Hardie		Calgary, Alberta
Katie Ford	Emily Middaugh	Madison Fisher	Kelly Middaugh		Waterloo, Ontario
Serena Gray-Withers	Catherine Clifford	Lindsey Burgess	Zoe Cinnamon		Edmonton, Alberta
Mahra Harris	Meredith Cole	Sasha Wilson	Elizabeth Bowles		Victoria, British Columbia
Shaela Hayward	Keira Krahn	India Young	Dayna Wahl		Winnipeg, Manitoba
Fay Henderson	Lisa Davie	Laura Watt	Katie McMillan		Stirling, Scotland
Allory Johnson	Gianna Johnson	Morgan Zacher	Bailey Vaydich		(United States) Blaine, Minnesota
Chloe Johnston	Julia Kennedy	Claire Corneillie	Savannah Dutka		Beaumont, Alberta
Kang Bo-bae	Shim Yu-jeong	Kim Min-seo	Kim Ji-soo	Lee Bo-yeong	Jeonbuk, South Korea
Lila Koe	Abby Whitbread	Andie Ingram	Ella Cardinal		Calgary, Alberta
Caitlin McPherson	Julie Magnusson	Ivy Jensen	Jorja Buhr		Winnipeg, Manitoba
Yuina Miura	Kohane Tsuruga	Rin Suzuki	Hana Ikeda		Sapporo, Japan
Taylor Sanderman	Sophia Gerace	Maisie Mears	Isabelle Cullen		Airdrie, Alberta
Subasthika Thangadurai	Claire Blaske	Abigail Lin	Amy Verway-Cohen		(United States) Oakland, California
Alena Yurko	Molly Whitbread	Camryn Adams	Kendra Koch		Sherwood Park, Alberta

==== Round robin standings ====
Final Round Robin Standings

Key
Teams to Playoffs

Pool A	W	SOW	SOL	L	PF	PA	Pts
(Scotland) Fay Henderson	3	0	0	0	29	7	9
(Manitoba) Shaela Hayward	2	0	0	1	17	14	6
(United States) Subasthika Thangadurai	1	0	0	2	15	21	3
(Alberta) Alena Yurko	0	0	0	3	7	26	0

Pool B	W	SOW	SOL	L	PF	PA	Pts
(Alberta) Serena Gray-Withers	3	0	0	0	22	8	9
(Alberta) Lila Koe	2	0	0	1	12	14	6
(United States) Allory Johnson	1	0	0	2	13	13	3
(Manitoba) Caitlin McPherson	0	0	0	3	8	20	0

Pool C	W	SOW	SOL	L	PF	PA	Pts
(Japan) Yuina Miura	3	0	0	0	20	5	9
(Ontario) Katie Ford	2	0	0	1	21	13	6
(British Columbia) Mahra Harris	1	0	0	2	14	17	3
(Alberta) Taylor Sanderman	0	0	0	3	7	26	0

Pool D	W	SOW	SOL	L	PF	PA	Pts
(Ontario) Emma Artichuk	3	0	0	0	18	4	9
(South Korea) Kang Bo-bae	2	0	0	1	14	9	6
(Alberta) Chloe Johnston	1	0	0	2	13	18	3
(Alberta) Keelie Duncan	0	0	0	3	7	21	0

==== Round robin results ====
All draw times are listed in Mountain Time (UTC−06:00).

===== Draw 2 =====
Thursday, October 16, 12:00 pm

Sheet 1	1	2	3	4	5	6	7	8	Final
(Alberta) Alena Yurko 🔨	1	0	2	0	1	1	0	0	5
(United States) Subasthika Thangadurai	0	2	0	3	0	0	1	1	7

Sheet 2	1	2	3	4	5	6	7	8	Final
(Scotland) Fay Henderson 🔨	0	3	0	2	0	1	0	1	7
(Manitoba) Shaela Hayward	0	0	2	0	1	0	1	0	4

Sheet 3	1	2	3	4	5	6	7	8	Final
(United States) Allory Johnson 🔨	0	0	2	0	0	0	0	0	2
(Alberta) Lila Koe	0	0	0	0	2	1	1	1	5

Sheet 4	1	2	3	4	5	6	7	8	Final
(Alberta) Serena Gray-Withers 🔨	1	0	2	0	0	1	1	2	7
(Manitoba) Caitlin McPherson	0	1	0	1	1	0	0	0	3

===== Draw 3 =====
Thursday, October 16, 4:00 pm

Sheet 1	1	2	3	4	5	6	7	8	Final
(Ontario) Katie Ford 🔨	1	1	0	0	2	1	4	X	9
(Alberta) Taylor Sanderman	0	0	2	1	0	0	0	X	3

Sheet 2	1	2	3	4	5	6	7	8	Final
(Japan) Yuina Miura	1	1	1	2	0	1	X	X	6
(British Columbia) Mahra Harris 🔨	0	0	0	0	1	0	X	X	1

Sheet 3	1	2	3	4	5	6	7	8	Final
(Ontario) Emma Artichuk	0	2	0	1	1	1	0	X	5
(Alberta) Chloe Johnston 🔨	1	0	1	0	0	0	1	X	3

Sheet 4	1	2	3	4	5	6	7	8	Final
(Alberta) Keelie Duncan	0	0	0	1	0	0	0	X	1
(South Korea) Kang Bo-bae 🔨	0	2	1	0	0	0	3	X	6

===== Draw 4 =====
Thursday, October 16, 8:00 pm

Sheet 1	1	2	3	4	5	6	7	8	Final
(United States) Allory Johnson 🔨	1	1	1	1	0	2	1	X	7
(Manitoba) Caitlin McPherson	0	0	0	0	2	0	0	X	2

Sheet 2	1	2	3	4	5	6	7	8	Final
(Alberta) Serena Gray-Withers 🔨	2	1	2	0	4	X	X	X	9
(Alberta) Lila Koe	0	0	0	1	0	X	X	X	1

Sheet 3	1	2	3	4	5	6	7	8	Final
(Alberta) Alena Yurko	0	0	1	0	1	0	X	X	2
(Manitoba) Shaela Hayward 🔨	1	2	0	2	0	2	X	X	7

Sheet 4	1	2	3	4	5	6	7	8	Final
(Scotland) Fay Henderson 🔨	1	0	1	1	0	4	3	X	10
(United States) Subasthika Thangadurai	0	1	0	0	2	0	0	X	3

===== Draw 5 =====
Friday, October 17, 8:00 am

Sheet 1	1	2	3	4	5	6	7	8	Final
(Ontario) Emma Artichuk 🔨	0	0	2	1	0	2	1	X	6
(South Korea) Kang Bo-bae	0	0	0	0	1	0	0	X	1

Sheet 2	1	2	3	4	5	6	7	8	Final
(Alberta) Keelie Duncan 🔨	1	0	3	1	0	1	0	0	6
(Alberta) Chloe Johnston	0	2	0	0	3	0	2	1	8

Sheet 5	1	2	3	4	5	6	7	8	Final
(Ontario) Katie Ford	0	0	1	0	2	3	0	3	9
(British Columbia) Mahra Harris 🔨	2	0	0	1	0	0	2	0	5

Sheet 6	1	2	3	4	5	6	7	8	Final
(Japan) Yuina Miura 🔨	3	0	1	3	2	X	X	X	9
(Alberta) Taylor Sanderman	0	1	0	0	0	X	X	X	1

===== Draw 6 =====
Friday, October 17, 12:00 pm

Sheet 3	1	2	3	4	5	6	7	8	Final
(United States) Allory Johnson	0	1	0	0	1	0	2	X	4
(Alberta) Serena Gray-Withers 🔨	1	0	1	2	0	2	0	X	6

Sheet 4	1	2	3	4	5	6	7	8	Final
(Manitoba) Caitlin McPherson 🔨	1	0	0	2	0	0	0	X	3
(Alberta) Lila Koe	0	2	1	0	1	1	1	X	6

Sheet 5	1	2	3	4	5	6	7	8	Final
(Alberta) Alena Yurko	0	0	0	0	X	X	X	X	0
(Scotland) Fay Henderson 🔨	4	2	2	4	X	X	X	X	12

Sheet 6	1	2	3	4	5	6	7	8	Final
(Manitoba) Shaela Hayward 🔨	0	1	0	1	2	2	0	0	6
(United States) Subasthika Thangadurai	0	0	1	0	0	0	3	1	5

===== Draw 7 =====
Friday, October 17, 4:00 pm

Sheet 4	1	2	3	4	5	6	7	8	Final
(Ontario) Katie Ford 🔨	0	0	0	2	1	0	0	X	3
(Japan) Yuina Miura	0	0	3	0	0	2	0	X	5

Sheet 6	1	2	3	4	5	6	7	8	Final
(British Columbia) Mahra Harris 🔨	1	0	0	3	2	2	X	X	8
(Alberta) Taylor Sanderman	0	0	3	0	0	0	X	X	3

===== Draw 8 =====
Friday, October 17, 8:00 pm

Sheet 5	1	2	3	4	5	6	7	8	Final
(Ontario) Emma Artichuk 🔨	2	1	2	2	X	X	X	X	7
(Alberta) Keelie Duncan	0	0	0	0	X	X	X	X	0

Sheet 6	1	2	3	4	5	6	7	8	Final
(South Korea) Kang Bo-bae 🔨	0	1	1	0	2	0	3	X	7
(Alberta) Chloe Johnston	0	0	0	1	0	1	0	X	2

==== Playoffs ====
Quarterfinals
A1	(Scotland) Fay Henderson	4
D2	(South Korea) Kang Bo-bae	2
B1	(Alberta) Serena Gray-Withers	5
C2	(Ontario) Katie Ford	4
C1	(Japan) Yuina Miura	9
B2	(Alberta) Lila Koe	1
D1	(Ontario) Emma Artichuk	7
A2	(Manitoba) Shaela Hayward	5

Semifinals
A1	(Scotland) Fay Henderson	5
B1	(Alberta) Serena Gray-Withers	6
C1	(Japan) Yuina Miura	7
D1	(Ontario) Emma Artichuk	6

Final
B1	(Alberta) Serena Gray-Withers	8
C1	(Japan) Yuina Miura	4

===== Quarterfinals =====
Saturday, October 18, 12:00 pm

Sheet 2	1	2	3	4	5	6	7	8	Final
(Scotland) Fay Henderson 🔨	0	0	0	1	2	0	1	X	4
(South Korea) Kang Bo-bae	0	1	0	0	0	1	0	X	2

Sheet 3	1	2	3	4	5	6	7	8	Final
(Alberta) Serena Gray-Withers 🔨	2	0	1	1	0	1	0	X	5
(Ontario) Katie Ford	0	1	0	0	2	0	1	X	4

Sheet 4	1	2	3	4	5	6	7	8	Final
(Japan) Yuina Miura 🔨	3	3	0	3	X	X	X	X	9
(Alberta) Lila Koe	0	0	1	0	X	X	X	X	1

Sheet 5	1	2	3	4	5	6	7	8	Final
(Ontario) Emma Artichuk 🔨	2	2	0	1	0	2	0	X	7
(Manitoba) Shaela Hayward	0	0	1	0	2	0	2	X	5

===== Semifinals =====
Saturday, October 18, 8:00 pm

Sheet 3	1	2	3	4	5	6	7	8	Final
(Scotland) Fay Henderson 🔨	1	0	2	0	0	1	1	0	5
(Alberta) Serena Gray-Withers	0	1	0	0	1	0	0	4	6

Sheet 4	1	2	3	4	5	6	7	8	9	Final
(Japan) Yuina Miura 🔨	0	1	2	2	0	1	0	0	1	7
(Ontario) Emma Artichuk	0	0	0	0	3	0	2	1	0	6

===== Final =====
Sunday, October 19, 10:00 am

Sheet B	1	2	3	4	5	6	7	8	Final
(Alberta) Serena Gray-Withers	0	0	1	0	3	0	2	2	8
(Japan) Yuina Miura 🔨	1	0	0	2	0	1	0	0	4
