= Aaron Sluchinski =

Canadian curler

- Curler
- Born: March 24, 1987 (age 39); Drayton Valley, Alberta

Team
- Curling club: Airdrie CC, Airdrie, AB
- Skip: Kevin Koe
- Third: Johnson Tao
- Second: Aaron Sluchinski
- Lead: Karrick Martin
- Mixed doubles partner: Amanda Sluchinski

Curling career
- Member Association: Alberta
- Brier: 4 (2022, 2024, 2025, 2026)
- Top CTRS ranking: 6th (2025–26)
Medal record
Men's Curling
Representing Canada
The Brier
Bronze medal – third place	2022 Lethbridge
Representing Alberta
The Brier
Silver medal – second place	2026 St. John's
Canadian Mixed Doubles Championship
Bronze medal – third place	2023 Sudbury

Aaron Sluchinski (born March 24, 1987) is a Canadian curler from Airdrie, Alberta. He currently plays second on Team Kevin Koe.

== Career ==
=== Juniors ===
Sluchinski made his first national appearance at the 2008 Canadian Junior Curling Championships skipping his Alberta rink of Justin Sluchinski, Colin Hodgson and Tylor Bennet. The team finished with a 7–5 record, missing the playoffs and settling for fifth place. He would play in his first Boston Pizza Cup, Alberta's men's provincial championship, in 2012 as second for Kevin Park. The team finished with a 3–3 record in the triple knockout format, failing to advance to the playoff round.

=== Men's ===
Sluchinski and his team had a great run at the 2013 Boston Pizza Cup, qualifying for the playoffs through the B Event. They then lost both of their playoffs games to Kevin Martin and Kevin Koe, settling for third place. The following season, he won his first World Curling Tour event at the Black Diamond / High River Cash. At provincials, they lost to Team Koe in the C Event Final.

Team Sluchinski won two more tour events during the 2014–15 season at The Good Times Bonspiel and the McKee Homes Fall Curling Classic. At the 2015 Boston Pizza Cup, they qualified for the playoffs through the C Side before losing to the Mick Lizmore rink in the 3 vs. 4 page playoff game. He joined Darren Moulding's rink the following season and defended his title at the McKee Homes Fall Curling Classic. The team failed to qualify for the provincial championship after losing the Southern Alberta qualifier. He would win two more tour events at the 2017 Avonair Cash Spiel and the 2017 Black Diamond / High River Cash during the 2017–18 season.

Team Sluchinski began the 2023–24 curling season at the 2023 PointsBet Invitational tournament, organized by Curling Canada. There, the team was eliminated in the "Sweep 16" round against Mike McEwen. The team played in three Grand Slam of Curling events during the season, the 2023 Tour Challenge, the 2023 National and the 2023 Masters, failing to make the playoffs in all three. Later in the season, the team won the 2024 Boston Pizza Cup when they defeated Kevin Koe in the final in an upset. The team represented one of the Alberta teams at the 2024 Montana's Brier. There, they finished pool play with a 4–4 record.

At the beginning of the 2024–25 curling season, Sluchinski announced that he would be leaving his team and joining the Kevin Koe rink team at third. The team qualified for two Grand slam events, the 2024 Tour Challenge and 2024 Canadian Open where they went 2–3 and 1–3 respectively, failing to make the playoffs. The team however won the Alberta provincial men's championship, the 2025 Boston Pizza Cup, qualifying them to represent Alberta at the 2025 Montana's Brier. At the Brier, the team finished with a 4–4 record, missing the playoffs.

=== Mixed doubles ===
In 2020, Sluchinski and his mixed doubles partner Brittany Tran won the 2020 Alberta Mixed Doubles Curling Championship, however did not get to compete in the 2020 Canadian Mixed Doubles Curling Championship as it was cancelled due to the COVID-19 pandemic in Canada. As the 2021 Alberta provincial playdowns were cancelled due to the COVID-19 pandemic in Alberta, Sluchinski and Tran were selected to represent Alberta at the 2021 Canadian Mixed Doubles Curling Championship in Calgary. At the championship, the pair finished the round robin with a 4–2 record, qualifying for the championship round as the eleventh seed. They then faced eventual champions Kerri Einarson and Brad Gushue in the round of 12 where they lost 9–8, eliminating them from contention. In 2023, Sluchinski and Tran qualified for the 2023 Canadian Mixed Doubles Curling Championship through ranking points. The team had a strong showing again at the event, going 5–2 in the round robin to qualify for the playoffs again as the eleventh seeds. There, they knocked off Laurie St-Georges and Félix Asselin in a qualification game and then beat Laura Walker and Kirk Muyres in the quarterfinals. They could not continue their run in the semifinals, however, losing in an extra end to Jocelyn Peterman and Brett Gallant.

After Tran stopped curling mixed doubles to focus on her women's team, Sluchinski teamed up with his wife Amanda, and won the 2024 Alberta Mixed Doubles Championship, earning the pair a trip to the 2024 Canadian Mixed Doubles Curling Championship. At the national mixed doubles, the pair finished pool play with a 4–3 record. In the playoffs, they won their first match against Andrea Kelly and Tyler Tardi. They lost in the quarterfinals to Laura Walker and Kirk Muyres.

== Personal life ==
Sluchinski works as a finance director for Boom Construction. He and wife Amanda have two children.

== Grand Slam record ==
Key
C	Champion
F	Lost in Final
SF	Lost in Semifinal
QF	Lost in Quarterfinals
R16	Lost in the round of 16
Q	Did not advance to playoffs
T2	Played in Tier 2 event
DNP	Did not participate in event
N/A	Not a Grand Slam event that season

Event	2022–23	2023–24	2024–25	2025–26	2026–27
Invitational	T2	Q	T2	Q	Q
Masters	DNP	Q	DNP	T2	Q
National	DNP	Q	DNP	DNP	DNP
Open	DNP	DNP	Q	T2	DNP

== Teams ==
Season	Skip	Third	Second	Lead
2006–07	Aaron Sluchinski	Colin Jenkyns	Matt Willerton	Steve Lindberg
2007–08	Aaron Sluchinski	Justin Sluchinski	Colin Hodgson	Tylor Bennet
2008–09	Shane Pacholuk	Aaron Sluchinski	Neil Bratrud	Kyle Richard
2009–10	Justin Sluchinski (Fourth)	Aaron Sluchinski (Skip)	Brad Chyz	Joe Vrolson
2010–11	Aaron Sluchinski	Justin Sluchinski	Joe Vrolson	David Sluchinski
2011–12	Kevin Park	Shane Park	Aaron Sluchinski	Eric Richard
2012–13	Justin Sluchinski	Aaron Sluchinski	Dylan Webster	Craig Bourgonje
2013–14	Robert Schlender	Aaron Sluchinski	Justin Sluchinski	Dylan Webster
2014–15	Aaron Sluchinski	Justin Sluchinski	Dylan Webster	Eric Richard
2015–16	Darren Moulding	Aaron Sluchinski	Justin Sluchinski	Eric Richard
2016–17	Aaron Sluchinski	Justin Sluchinski	Eric Richard	Kyle Richard
2017–18	Aaron Sluchinski	Dean Mamer	Kerr Drummond	Dylan Webster
2018–19	Aaron Sluchinski	Dean Mamer	Eric Richard	Dylan Webster
2019–20	Aaron Sluchinski	Kerr Drummond	Dylan Webster	Don Bartlett
2020–21	Aaron Sluchinski	Kerr Drummond	Dylan Webster	Cole Adams
2021–22	Aaron Sluchinski	Kerr Drummond	Dylan Webster	–
2022–23	Aaron Sluchinski	Jeremy Harty	Kerr Drummond	Dylan Webster
2023–24	Aaron Sluchinski	Jeremy Harty	Kerr Drummond	Dylan Webster
2024 (Sept.–Oct.)	Aaron Sluchinski	Jeremy Harty	Kyle Doering	Dylan Webster
2024–25	Kevin Koe	Aaron Sluchinski	Tyler Tardi	Karrick Martin
2025–26	Kevin Koe	Tyler Tardi	Aaron Sluchinski	Karrick Martin
2026–27	Kevin Koe	Johnson Tao	Aaron Sluchinski	Karrick Martin
