= Tyler Tardi =

Canadian curler (born 1998)

- Curler
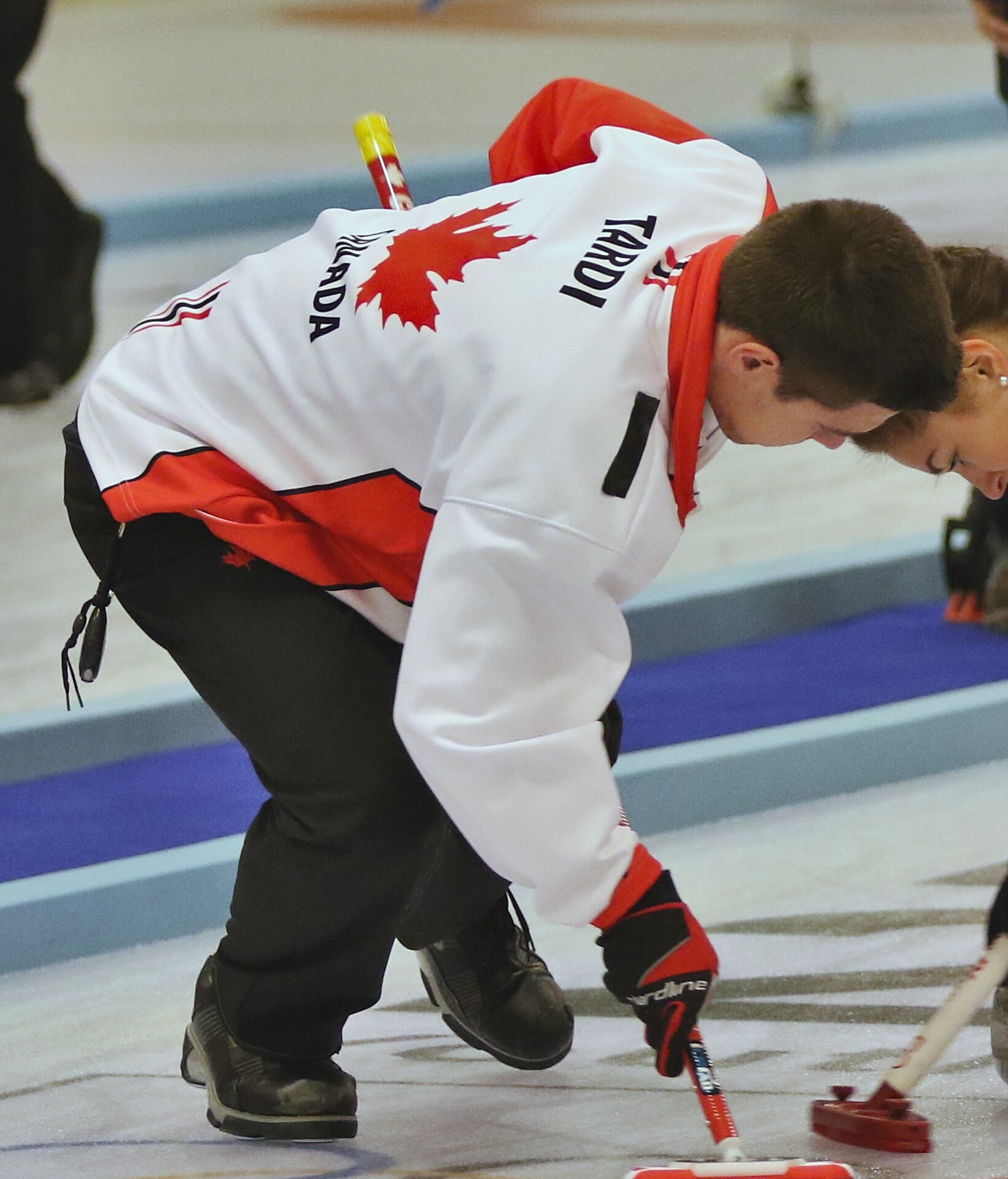
- Born: August 10, 1998 (age 28); Richmond, British Columbia, Canada

Team
- Curling club: Langley CC, Langley, BC
- Skip: Tyler Tardi
- Third: Colton Flasch
- Second: Kevin Marsh
- Lead: Dan Marsh

Curling career
- Member Association: British Columbia (2013–2022); Alberta (2022–2026); Saskatchewan (2026–present)
- Brier: 5 (2021, 2023, 2024, 2025, 2026)
- World Championship: 1 (2025)
- Pan Continental Championship: 1 (2025)
- Olympic: 1 (2026)
- Top CTRS ranking: 3rd (2023–24)
- Grand Slam victories: 1 (2023 Players')
Medal record
Curling
Representing Canada
Olympic Games
Gold medal – first place	2026 Milano Cortina
World Curling Championships
Bronze medal – third place	2025 Moose Jaw
Pan Continental Championships
Gold medal – first place	2025 Virginia
Winter Youth Olympics
Gold medal – first place	2016 Lillehammer
World Junior Curling Championships
Gold medal – first place	2018 Aberdeen
Gold medal – first place	2019 Liverpool
Representing British Columbia
Canadian Mixed Doubles Championship
Bronze medal – third place	2023 Sudbury
Canada Winter Games
Bronze medal – third place	2015 Prince George
Representing Alberta
The Brier
Silver medal – second place	2026 St. John's

Tyler N. Tardi (born August 10, 1998 in Richmond, British Columbia) is a Canadian curler originally from Cloverdale, British Columbia. He currently skips his own team out of Saskatchewan. Most notably, Tardi won an Olympic gold medal as the alternate of the Canadian men's curling team at 2026 Winter Olympics.

== Career ==
=== Juniors ===
Tardi first came onto the national curling scene skipping the host British Columbia team at the 2015 Canada Winter Games in Prince George, British Columbia where he would pick up a bronze medal. After losing in the British Columbia junior finals in both 2013 and 2014, Tardi and his rink of Daniel Wenzek, brother Jordan and Nicholas Meister won the 2016 British Columbia men's junior championship. The team represented the province at the 2016 Canadian Junior Curling Championships, and went 7-3 after the round robin portion, making the playoffs in third place. The team would have to settle for a bronze medal after they lost to Manitoba's Matt Dunstone in the semi-final.

A month later, Tardi would throw third stones (Joined by Sterling Middleton, Mary Fay and Karlee Burgess of Nova Scotia) for Team Canada at the 2016 Winter Youth Olympics. The team steamrolled through the opposition, winning all 10 of their games before claiming a gold medal for their country. In the mixed doubles event, Tardi was teamed up with Japan's Honoka Sasaki. The pair made it to the semi-finals before losing to China's Han Yu and Great Britain's Ross Whyte. They then lost in the bronze medal final to China's Zhao Ruiyi and Norway's Andreas Hårstad.

Tardi and his team of Middleton, Jordan Tardi, and Meister won a second provincial junior title in 2017. Representing British Columbia at the 2017 Canadian Junior Curling Championships, the team lost one round robin game en route to winning the national championship, defeating Ontario's Matthew Hall rink in the final. The team represented Canada at the 2017 World Junior Curling Championships, where they finished the round robin with a 6–3 record, but lost to Norway in a tiebreaker game. That year, Tardi also skipped British Columbia at the 2017 Canadian U18 Curling Championships, losing just one round robin game. However, he was not successful in the playoffs, losing in the semifinal, but rebounded in the bronze medal game, defeating Saskatchewan's Rylan Kleiter.

In 2018, Tardi, Middleton, Jordan and new lead Zac Curtis won a third provincial junior title. At the 2018 Canadian Junior Curling Championships, Tardi would defend his title. After losing three round robin games, he had to fight through a tiebreaker before winning two playoff games, including defeating Northern Ontario's Tanner Horgan rink in the final. The team represented Canada at the 2018 World Junior Curling Championships, where they were much more successful. The team lost two round robin games, and won both playoff games, including defeating Scotland in the final to claim the gold medal.

In 2019, Tardi and Middleton added a new front end of Matthew Hall, his opponent in the 2017 Junior finals and Alex Horvath and won a fourth provincial junior title. At the 2019 Canadian Junior Curling Championships, he led his province to his third-straight national championship, becoming the first skip to win three-straight junior championships. Tardi lost just one game en route to the title, and defeated Manitoba's J.T. Ryan in the final. Tardi once again represented Canada at the 2019 World Junior Curling Championships. After posting a 7–2 round robin record, he won both playoff games, including defeating Switzerland's Marco Hösli rink in the final.

The 2019-20 curling season would have been Tardi's last year of junior eligibility, but he decided to make the jump to men's curling full-time, eschewing the junior ranks.

=== Men's ===
==== British Columbia (2013–2022) ====
Tardi has been playing on the World Curling Tour since 2013. He won his first tour event at the 2016 Prestige Hotels & Resorts Curling Classic. He played in his first Grand Slam event at the 2018 Humpty's Champions Cup by virtue of winning the World Junior championship. He went 1–3 at the event, missing the playoffs. He won another tour event to begin the next season at the 2018 King Cash Spiel. His junior team qualified for the 2019 Champions Cup by winning the World Juniors again. There, the team went win-less in their four matches. In his first post-junior season, he won the 2019 Prestige Hotels & Resorts Curling Classic. The next season, he won the 2020 Raymond James Kelowna Double Cash event.

Tardi qualified for his first men's provincial championship in 2016, but had to bow out due to his participation at that year's Youth Olympics. The rest of his team played short-handed, and went 2–3. Tardi played in the 2017 BC Men's Curling Championship, going 3-3. He didn't enter playdowns in 2018, but was back at it at the 2019 BC Men's Curling Championship. There, his team were eliminated after posting a 2–3 record. He finally made the playoffs at the 2020 BC Men's Curling Championship, where he lost in the final to Jim Cotter.

Team did not play in any major events in the 2020-21 curling season due to the COVID-19 pandemic. The next season, they played at the 2021 Canadian Olympic Curling Pre-Trials. After finishing group play with a 4–2 record, they lost in the B quarter-finals to Glenn Howard. The team played at the 2022 BC Men's Curling Championship, where they were eliminated in the C1 vs. C2 page playoff game against Jim Cotter.

The Tardi rink disbanded in 2022, with Tardi joining the Kevin Koe rink at third.

==== Team Koe (2022–present) ====
The new-look Koe foursome began the 2022–23 curling season playing in the inaugural 2022 PointsBet Invitational, and were knocked out in the quarterfinals to Reid Carruthers. The next month, the team played in their first Slam of the season, the 2022 National. After going 3–1 in pool play, the team lost in the quarters to Matt Dunstone. A couple of weeks later, the team played in the 2022 Tour Challenge, going 2–2 in pool play. This put them in a tiebreaker against John Epping, which they won. They then beat Joël Retornaz in the quarters before losing to Dunstone again in the semifinal. In December, the team played in their third slam of the season, the 2022 Masters. They failed to make the playoffs after posting a 1–3 record in pool play. The following month, the team again failed to make the playoffs at the 2023 Canadian Open. Koe won his eighth career provincial title in February at the 2023 Boston Pizza Cup. The team lost just two games en route to defeating the Brendan Bottcher rink in the Alberta final. They represented Alberta at the 2023 Tim Hortons Brier, where Koe led the rink to a 7–1 record in pool play. They would be eliminated in their first playoff game, however, losing to Ontario (skipped by Mike McEwen). The team wrapped up their season at the 2023 Players' Championship. There, the team went 4–1 in pool play, and then won all three of their playoff games, including defeating Switzerland's Yannick Schwaller rink in the final. To win, Koe had to make a triple takeout to score three with just seconds on his game clock. It would be the final event for Bradley Thiessen who is stepping away from the game. Thiessen was replaced on the team by Jacques Gauthier, Tardi's cousin, for the 2023–24 curling season. During their first season together, the new Koe rink lost the final of the 2024 Boston Pizza Cup to Aaron Sluchinski. However, the rink still participated in the 2024 Montana's Brier as the top non-qualified team on the 2023–24 CTRS standings following provincial and territorial playdowns. At the Brier, the Koe rink, who was at the time the third ranked team in the country, finished pool play with a 2–6 record, failing to qualify for the playoffs. Koe called the feeling "about rock bottom".

After a poor showing during the 2023-24 season, the Kevin Koe rink announced at the beginning of the 2024-25 curling season that they would be parting ways with second Jacques Gauthier, and that Aaron Sluchinski will be joining the team at third, with Tardi moving to second. The team qualified for two Grand slam events, the 2024 Tour Challenge and 2024 Canadian Open where they went 2–3 and 1–3 respectively, failing to make the playoffs. The team however won the Alberta provincial men's championship, the 2025 Boston Pizza Cup, qualifying them to represent Alberta at the 2025 Montana's Brier. At the Brier, the team finished with a 4–4 record, missing the playoffs. However, Tardi would represent Canada at the 2025 World Men's Curling Championship as the alternate for the winning Brad Jacobs rink. At the 2025 World's, the Jacobs rink would go 11–1 in round robin play, but would lose to Scotland's Bruce Mouat in the semi-final. The team would rebound to win the bronze medal, beating China's Xu Xiaoming 11–2 in the bronze medal game. Tardi would finish off the season by playing again with the Jacobs rink, this time playing second and sparing for Brett Gallant at the 2025 Players' Championship Grand Slam Event. There, they would lose 6–2 in the semifinals to eventual champion Bruce Mouat.

The Koe rink would start the 2025–26 curling season in the Tier 2 event of the 2025 Masters Grand Slam event, where they would lose in the final 4–2 to Daniel Casper. Tardi would again step-in to be the alternate for Team Brad Jacobs at the 2025 Pan Continental Curling Championships, where they would go undefeated and win the event, winning the final against USA's John Shuster 7–3. Tardi and the rest of Team Koe would compete at the 2025 Canadian Olympic Curling Trials, where they would finish 3–4, just missing out on the playoffs. However, the winning Jacobs rink announced that they had again selected Tardi to be their alternate, this time for the 2026 Winter Olympics, marking Tardi's first adult Olympic appearance.

=== Mixed doubles ===
In addition to playing in the mixed doubles event at the 2016 Youth Olympics, Tardi has also won two BC mixed doubles championships (2013 and 2015) with Dezaray Hawes. The pair would go 4–3 at both the 2013 Canadian Mixed Doubles Curling Trials and 2015 Canadian Mixed Doubles Curling Trials. In 2015, their record was good enough to make it to the playoffs, where they lost in the round of 12 to Glenn Howard and daughter Carly. They also competed in the 2019 Canadian Mixed Doubles Curling Championship, where they were first in their round-robin pool, but lost in the quarterfinal to Kadriana Sahaidak and Colton Lott.

== Personal life ==
Tardi was a student at Kwantlen Polytechnic University and was an online motion graphic design student at the School of Motion. He is married to fellow curler Dezaray Hawes. He currently works as a brand and marketing designer for Curling Alberta and lives in Calgary. He is the nephew of three-time Canadian champion Cathy Gauthier and cousin to her son Jacques, 2020 Canadian Junior Men's curling champion skip, and former teammate.

== Grand Slam record ==
Key
C	Champion
F	Lost in Final
SF	Lost in Semifinal
QF	Lost in Quarterfinals
R16	Lost in the round of 16
Q	Did not advance to playoffs
T2	Played in Tier 2 event
DNP	Did not participate in event
N/A	Not a Grand Slam event that season

Event	2016–17	2017–18	2018–19	2019–20	2020–21	2021–22	2022–23	2023–24	2024–25	2025–26	2026–27
Invitational	T2	DNP	DNP	DNP	N/A	N/A	SF	Q	Q	Q	DNP
Masters	DNP	DNP	DNP	DNP	N/A	DNP	Q	Q	DNP	T2	DNP
National	DNP	DNP	DNP	DNP	N/A	QF (Note: Tardi spared for Braeden Moskowy on Team Matt Dunstone.)	QF	Q	DNP	DNP	DNP
Open	DNP	DNP	DNP	DNP	N/A	N/A	Q	Q	Q	T2	
Players'	DNP	DNP	DNP	N/A	SF (Note: Tardi spared for Mike McEwen.)	DNP	C	Q	SF (Note: Tardi spared for Brett Gallant on Team Brad Jacobs.)	DNP	
Champions Cup	DNP	Q	Q	N/A	Q	QF (Note: Tardi spared for Jason Gunnlaugson.)	DNP	N/A	N/A	N/A	N/A

== Teams ==
Season	Skip	Third	Second	Lead
2013–14	Tyler Tardi	Jordan Tardi	Nick Meister	Zachary Umbach
2014–15	Tyler Tardi	Jordan Tardi	Nick Meister	Zachary Umbach
2015–16	Tyler Tardi	Daniel Wenzek	Jordan Tardi	Nick Meister
2016–17	Tyler Tardi	Sterling Middleton	Jordan Tardi	Nick Meister
2017–18	Tyler Tardi	Sterling Middleton	Jordan Tardi	Zac Curtis
2018–19	Tyler Tardi	Sterling Middleton	Matthew Hall	Alex Horvath
2019–20	Tyler Tardi	Sterling Middleton	Jordan Tardi	Alex Horvath
2020–21	Tyler Tardi	Sterling Middleton	Jason Ginter	Jordan Tardi
2021–22	Tyler Tardi	Sterling Middleton	Jason Ginter	Jordan Tardi
2022–23	Kevin Koe	Tyler Tardi	Brad Thiessen	Karrick Martin
2023–24	Kevin Koe	Tyler Tardi	Jacques Gauthier	Karrick Martin
2024–25	Kevin Koe	Tyler Tardi	Jacques Gauthier (September)	Karrick Martin
2024–25	Kevin Koe	Aaron Sluchinski	Tyler Tardi	Karrick Martin
2025–26	Kevin Koe	Tyler Tardi	Aaron Sluchinski	Karrick Martin
2026–27	Tyler Tardi	Colton Flasch	Kevin Marsh	Dan Marsh
