= 2023 Boston Pizza Cup =

Curling competition held in Alberta, Canada

- Host city: Enoch, Alberta
- Arena: River Cree Resort and Casino
- Dates: February 8–12
- Winner: Team Koe
- Curling club: The Glencoe Club, Calgary
- Skip: Kevin Koe
- Third: Tyler Tardi
- Second: Brad Thiessen
- Lead: Karrick Martin
- Finalist: Brendan Bottcher

The 2023 Boston Pizza Cup, the provincial men's curling championship for Alberta, was held February 8 to 12 at the River Cree Resort and Casino in Enoch, Alberta. The winning Kevin Koe rink represented Alberta at the 2023 Tim Hortons Brier in London, Ontario where after placing second in Pool A with a 7–1 record, they lost in the Championship round semifinal to Ontario 9–8.

Additionally, two other rinks qualified for the Brier as wild card teams based on CTRS standings. The Brendan Bottcher rink was the Wild Card #1 representative while the Karsten Sturmay rink was the Wild Card #3 representative. The Bottcher rink would end up with a bronze medal finish losing to eventual runner-up Manitoba in the semifinal 7–5. The Sturmay rink finished sixth in Pool B with a 3–5 record.

== Qualification process ==
Qualification method	Berths	Qualifying team(s)
WCT Leaders	3	Brendan Bottcher; Kevin Koe; Karsten Sturmay
Excel Points Leader	2	Aaron Sluchinski; Scott Webb
Okotoks Qualifier	2	Kyler Kleibrink; Daylan Vavrek
Slave Lake Qualifier	2	Warren Cross; Johnson Tao
Edmonton Qualifier	3	Ryan Jacques; Parker Konschuh; Warren Kozak

== Teams ==
The teams are listed as follows:

Skip	Third	Second	Lead	Alternate	Club
Brendan Bottcher	Marc Kennedy	Brett Gallant	Ben Hebert		The Glencoe Club, Calgary
Warren Cross	Tyler Pfeiffer	Morgan Van Doesburg	Mike Lambert		Saville Community SC, Edmonton
Ryan Jacques	Desmond Young	Andrew Gittis	Gabe Dyck		Saville Community SC, Edmonton
Kyler Kleibrink	Chris Kennedy	Evan van Amsterdam	Tyler van Amsterdam		The Glencoe Club, Calgary
Kevin Koe	Tyler Tardi	Brad Thiessen	Karrick Martin		The Glencoe Club, Calgary
Parker Konschuh	Craig Bourgonje	Landon Bucholz	Bryce Bucholz		Derrick G&WC, Edmonton
Warren Kozak	Michael Dumont	Dwayne Romanchuk	J. R. Falzetta	Kris Gira	Airdie CC, Airdrie; North Hill CC, Calgary
Aaron Sluchinski	Jeremy Harty	Ted Appelman (Note: Appelman replaced Drummond on the team, as his wife was expecting to give birth.)	Dylan Webster	Kerr Drummond	The Glencoe Club, Calgary
Karsten Sturmay	J. D. Lind	Kyle Doering	Glenn Venance	Kurtis Goller	St. Albert CC, St. Albert
Johnson Tao	Jaedon Neuert	Ben Morin	Adam Naugler		Saville Community SC, Edmonton
Daylan Vavrek	Rolland Robinson	Tyler Lautner	Evan Asmussen	Carter Lautner	Sexsmith CC, Sexsmith
Scott Webb	Tristan Steinke	Jordan Steinke	Andrew Dunbar	Shawn Donnelly	Grande Prairie CC, Grande Prairie

== Knockout brackets ==
=== A event ===
First Knockout	Qualifier 1
Brendan Bottcher	8
Johnson Tao	1	Kyler Kleibrink	1
Kyler Kleibrink	9	Brendan Bottcher	9
Karsten Sturmay	1
Karsten Sturmay	9
Scott Webb	7	Parker Konschuh	1
Parker Konschuh	10	Brendan Bottcher	8
Daylan Vavrek	3
Aaron Sluchinski	11
Ryan Jacques	8	Ryan Jacques	3
Warren Cross	3	Aaron Sluchinski	4
Daylan Vavrek	5
Kevin Koe	5
Daylan Vavrek	8	Daylan Vavrek	6
Warren Kozak	2

=== B event ===
Second Knockout	Qualifier 2
Johnson Tao	7
Parker Konschuh	11	Parker Konschuh	2
Aaron Sluchinski	8
Aaron Sluchinski	7
Warren Cross	6	Kevin Koe	8
Kevin Koe	10	Kevin Koe	8
Karsten Sturmay	4
Kevin Koe	6
Scott Webb	9	Ryan Jacques	5
Kyler Kleibrink	4	Scott Webb	8
Warren Kozak	5	Ryan Jacques	9
Ryan Jacques	7	Ryan Jacques	7
Daylan Vavrek	4

=== C event ===
Third Knockout				Qualifier 3
Kyler Kleibrink	5
Parker Konschuh	9	Parker Konschuh	2
Warren Kozak	3	Karsten Sturmay	6
Karsten Sturmay	9			Karsten Sturmay	9
				Ryan Jacques	7

Third Knockout				Qualifier 4
		Daylan Vavrek	9
Johnson Tao	4	Warren Cross	6
Warren Cross	6			Daylan Vavrek	1
				Aaron Sluchinski	8
		Scott Webb	4
		Aaron Sluchinski	9

== Knockout results ==
All draw times are listed in Mountain Time (UTC-07:00).

=== Draw 1 ===
Wednesday, February 8, 1:00 pm

Sheet A	1	2	3	4	5	6	7	8	9	10	Final
Johnson Tao 🔨	0	0	0	1	0	0	X	X	X	X	1
Kyler Kleibrink	2	0	1	0	3	3	X	X	X	X	9

Sheet B	1	2	3	4	5	6	7	8	9	10	Final
Scott Webb 🔨	2	0	2	0	0	0	3	0	0	0	7
Parker Konschuh	0	1	0	2	2	1	0	0	2	2	10

Sheet C	1	2	3	4	5	6	7	8	9	10	Final
Warren Cross 🔨	0	0	1	0	1	0	0	1	0	X	3
Ryan Jacques	0	2	0	2	0	0	1	0	3	X	8

Sheet D	1	2	3	4	5	6	7	8	9	10	Final
Warren Kozak	0	0	0	0	1	0	1	0	0	X	2
Daylan Vavrek 🔨	0	0	0	3	0	3	0	0	2	X	8

=== Draw 2 ===
Wednesday, February 8, 6:30 pm

Sheet A	1	2	3	4	5	6	7	8	9	10	Final
Brendan Bottcher 🔨	0	2	0	4	0	2	X	X	X	X	8
Kyler Kleibrink	0	0	0	0	1	0	X	X	X	X	1

Sheet B	1	2	3	4	5	6	7	8	9	10	Final
Parker Konschuh 🔨	0	0	1	0	0	0	0	0	X	X	1
Karsten Sturmay	2	0	0	1	1	1	1	3	X	X	9

Sheet C	1	2	3	4	5	6	7	8	9	10	Final
Ryan Jacques 🔨	1	0	1	0	1	0	0	X	X	X	3
Aaron Sluchinski	0	3	0	1	0	2	5	X	X	X	11

Sheet D	1	2	3	4	5	6	7	8	9	10	11	Final
Daylan Vavrek 🔨	0	0	2	0	0	0	2	1	0	0	1	6
Kevin Koe	0	1	0	2	0	1	0	0	0	1	0	5

=== Draw 3 ===
Thursday, February 9, 9:00 am

Sheet B	1	2	3	4	5	6	7	8	9	10	Final
Warren Cross	0	2	0	1	0	2	0	1	0	X	6
Kevin Koe 🔨	2	0	2	0	2	0	1	0	3	X	10

Sheet D	1	2	3	4	5	6	7	8	9	10	Final
Parker Konschuh	0	3	0	0	3	0	2	0	0	3	11
Johnson Tao 🔨	2	0	1	1	0	1	0	1	1	0	7

=== Draw 4 ===
Thursday, February 9, 2:00 pm

Sheet A	1	2	3	4	5	6	7	8	9	10	Final
Brendan Bottcher 🔨	3	0	3	2	1	X	X	X	X	X	9
Karsten Sturmay	0	1	0	0	0	X	X	X	X	X	1

Sheet B	1	2	3	4	5	6	7	8	9	10	Final
Aaron Sluchinski	0	0	0	0	0	3	0	0	0	1	4
Daylan Vavrek 🔨	0	0	1	0	1	0	1	2	0	0	5

Sheet C	1	2	3	4	5	6	7	8	9	10	Final
Kyler Kleibrink 🔨	1	0	0	1	1	0	1	0	X	X	4
Scott Webb	0	2	1	0	0	3	0	3	X	X	9

Sheet D	1	2	3	4	5	6	7	8	9	10	Final
Warren Kozak	0	1	0	1	1	0	0	0	2	X	5
Ryan Jacques 🔨	1	0	4	0	0	0	2	0	0	X	7

=== Draw 5 ===
Thursday, February 9, 7:00 pm

Sheet A	1	2	3	4	5	6	7	8	9	10	Final
Kevin Koe 🔨	1	0	1	0	1	1	2	0	2	X	8
Karsten Sturmay	0	2	0	1	0	0	0	1	0	X	4

Sheet B	1	2	3	4	5	6	7	8	9	10	Final
Aaron Sluchinski	1	0	5	2	0	X	X	X	X	X	8
Parker Konschuh 🔨	0	1	0	0	1	X	X	X	X	X	2

Sheet C	1	2	3	4	5	6	7	8	9	10	Final
Brendan Bottcher	0	1	2	1	0	0	4	X	X	X	8
Daylan Vavrek 🔨	2	0	0	0	1	0	0	X	X	X	3

Sheet D	1	2	3	4	5	6	7	8	9	10	Final
Ryan Jacques	1	0	0	0	3	0	5	0	0	0	9
Scott Webb 🔨	0	0	1	2	0	1	0	2	1	1	8

=== Draw 6 ===
Friday, February 10, 8:30 am

Sheet B	1	2	3	4	5	6	7	8	9	10	Final
Parker Konschuh	0	1	0	2	0	0	1	0	2	3	9
Kyler Kleibrink 🔨	1	0	1	0	0	1	0	2	0	0	5

Sheet C	1	2	3	4	5	6	7	8	9	10	Final
Johnson Tao	0	0	0	1	1	1	0	0	1	0	4
Warren Cross 🔨	1	1	1	0	0	0	1	1	0	1	6

Sheet D	1	2	3	4	5	6	7	8	9	10	Final
Karsten Sturmay 🔨	4	1	0	0	2	0	2	X	X	X	9
Warren Kozak	0	0	1	1	0	1	0	X	X	X	3

=== Draw 7 ===
Friday, February 10, 1:00 pm

Sheet A	1	2	3	4	5	6	7	8	9	10	Final
Ryan Jacques 🔨	0	1	0	2	0	2	0	0	0	2	7
Daylan Vavrek	0	0	2	0	1	0	0	1	0	0	4

Sheet C	1	2	3	4	5	6	7	8	9	10	Final
Kevin Koe	0	2	0	1	1	0	0	3	0	1	8
Aaron Sluchinski 🔨	2	0	1	0	0	2	0	0	2	0	7

=== Draw 8 ===
Friday, February 10, 5:00 pm

Sheet A	1	2	3	4	5	6	7	8	9	10	11	Final
Ryan Jacques 🔨	1	0	0	2	0	1	0	1	0	0	0	5
Kevin Koe	0	0	2	0	0	0	2	0	0	1	1	6

Sheet B	1	2	3	4	5	6	7	8	9	10	11	Final
Warren Cross 🔨	0	1	0	2	0	1	0	1	0	1	0	6
Daylan Vavrek	2	0	1	0	1	0	1	0	1	0	3	9

Sheet C	1	2	3	4	5	6	7	8	9	10	Final
Karsten Sturmay 🔨	0	2	0	0	2	0	0	2	0	X	6
Parker Konschuh	0	0	0	1	0	0	0	0	1	X	2

Sheet D	1	2	3	4	5	6	7	8	9	10	Final
Aaron Sluchinski 🔨	1	1	0	0	2	2	0	1	0	2	9
Scott Webb	0	0	2	1	0	0	1	0	0	0	4

=== Draw 9 ===
Saturday, February 11, 11:00 am

Sheet A	1	2	3	4	5	6	7	8	9	10	Final
Aaron Sluchinski	1	0	4	0	3	X	X	X	X	X	8
Daylan Vavrek	0	0	0	1	0	X	X	X	X	X	1

Sheet B	1	2	3	4	5	6	7	8	9	10	Final
Ryan Jacques	0	0	0	4	0	1	0	0	2	0	7
Karsten Sturmay	0	1	3	0	1	0	0	2	0	2	9

== Playoffs ==
Page playoff system
A	Brendan Bottcher	6
B	Kevin Koe	5
C1	Karsten Sturmay	3
C2	Aaron Sluchinski	8

Semifinal
B	Kevin Koe	6
C2	Aaron Sluchinski	2

Final
A	Brendan Bottcher	5
B	Kevin Koe	6

=== A vs. B ===
Saturday, February 11, 7:00 pm

Sheet A	1	2	3	4	5	6	7	8	9	10	Final
Brendan Bottcher 🔨	1	0	1	0	0	3	0	0	0	1	6
Kevin Koe	0	2	0	1	0	0	1	0	1	0	5

=== C1 vs. C2 ===
Saturday, February 11, 7:00 pm

Sheet D	1	2	3	4	5	6	7	8	9	10	Final
Karsten Sturmay	0	0	0	1	2	0	0	0	x	x	3
Aaron Sluchinski 🔨	0	2	1	0	0	2	1	2	x	x	8

=== Semifinal ===
Sunday, February 12, 10:00 am

Sheet C	1	2	3	4	5	6	7	8	9	10	Final
Aaron Sluchinski	0	0	1	0	0	0	0	1	0	X	2
Kevin Koe 🔨	0	1	0	2	0	0	1	0	2	X	6

=== Final ===
Sunday, February 12, 3:00 pm

Sheet C	1	2	3	4	5	6	7	8	9	10	Final
Brendan Bottcher 🔨	0	0	1	0	2	0	0	1	1	0	5
Kevin Koe	0	0	0	2	0	2	0	0	0	2	6

2023 Boston Pizza Cup

Kevin Koe
8th Alberta Provincial Championship title
