= Saville Grand Prix =

Annual curling tournament in Edmonton, Canada

- Established: 2023
- Host city: Edmonton, Alberta
- Arena: Saville Sports Centre
- Men's purse: $20,000
- Women's purse: $22,000

Current champions (2026)
- Men: (Alberta) Jaxon Hiebert
- Women: (Alberta) Selena Sturmay

Location in Canada

The Saville Grand Prix is an annual curling tournament, held in the fall at the Saville Community Sports Centre in Edmonton, Alberta. It has been part of the men's and women's tour cycle since the 2023–24 season. The event attracts many of the top teams from around the world, particularly on the women's side.

The inaugural event was held in October 2023 with a comparatively weaker field to subsequent years. Alberta's Ryan Jacques and Selena Sturmay won the first titles with Scott Webb and Delaney Strouse finishing as respective runners-up.

In 2024, the event was held on the first weekend of November with Korey Dropkin and Kerri Einarson defeating Japan's Takumi Maeda and Korea's Ha Seung-youn.

In 2025, the women's event was held in September while the men's event was held in October.

== Past champions ==
=== Men ===
| Year | Winning team | Runner up team | Purse (CAD) |
|---|---|---|---|
| 2023 | (Alberta) Ryan Jacques, Evan van Amsterdam, Andrew Gittis, Gabriel Dyck | (Alberta) Scott Webb, Tristan Steinke, Chris Kennedy, Jordan Steinke | $25,000 |
| 2024 | (United States) Korey Dropkin, Thomas Howell, Andrew Stopera, Lance Wheeler | (Japan) Takumi Maeda, Asei Nakahara, Hiroki Maeda, Uryu Kamikawa | $25,000 |
| 2025 | (Netherlands) Wouter Gösgens, Laurens Hoekman, Jaap van Dorp, Tobias van den Hurk, Alexander Magan | (Alberta) Evan van Amsterdam, Jeremy Harty, Jason Ginter, Parker Konschuh | $25,000 |
| 2026 | (Alberta) Jaxon Hiebert, Noah Mason-Wood, Nate Burton, Braeden Hein | (Alberta) Evan van Amsterdam, Jeremy Harty, Jason Ginter, Parker Konschuh | $20,000 |

=== Women ===
| Year | Winning team | Runner up team | Purse (CAD) |
|---|---|---|---|
| 2023 | (Alberta) Selena Sturmay, Danielle Schmiemann, Dezaray Hawes, Paige Papley | (United States) Delaney Strouse, Anne O'Hara, Sydney Mullaney, Rebecca Rodgers | $25,000 |
| 2024 | (Manitoba) Kerri Einarson, Val Sweeting, Joanne Courtney, Krysten Karwacki | (South Korea) Ha Seung-youn, Kim Hye-rin, Yang Tae-i, Kim Su-jin, Park Seo-jin | $25,000 |
| 2025 | (Manitoba) Kaitlyn Lawes (Fourth), Selena Njegovan (Skip), Jocelyn Peterman, Kristin Gordon | (South Korea) Park You-been, Lee Eun-chae, Kim Ji-yoon, Yang Seung-hee | $25,000 |
| 2026 | (Alberta) Selena Sturmay, Danielle Schmiemann, Dezaray Hawes, Paige Papley | (South Korea) Park You-been, Park Seo-jin, Yang Tae-i, Kim Su-jin | $22,000 |
