= 2022 Boston Pizza Cup =

2022 Boston Pizza Cup presented by Best Western
- Host city: Grande Prairie, Alberta
- Arena: Bonnetts Energy Centre
- Dates: January 3–9
- Winner: Team Koe
- Curling club: The Glencoe Club, Calgary
- Skip: Kevin Koe
- Third: John Morris
- Second: B. J. Neufeld
- Lead: Ben Hebert
- Finalist: Ted Appelman

The 2022 Boston Pizza Cup presented by Best Western, the provincial men's curling championship for Alberta, was held January 3 to 9 at the Bonnetts Energy Centre in Grande Prairie, Alberta. The winning Kevin Koe team represented Alberta at the 2022 Tim Hortons Brier in Lethbridge, Alberta. The event was held in conjunction with the 2022 Alberta Scotties Tournament of Hearts, the provincial women's curling championship.

== Qualification process ==
Qualification method	Berths	Qualifying team(s)
WCT Leaders	3	Kevin Koe; Ryan Jacques; Karsten Sturmay
Excel Points Leader	2	Jeremy Harty; Nathan Molberg
Fort McMurray Qualifier	1	~~Johnson Tao~~ (Note: Team Johnson Tao had to drop out of the event due to positive COVID-19 tests.); Jeff Reich
Cochrane Qualifier	4	Ted Appelman; Ryan Parent; ~~Jamie King~~ (Note: Team Jamie King also had to drop out of the event due to positive COVID-19 tests.); Parker Konschuh
Grande Prairie Qualifier	2	Scott Webb; Evan van Amsterdam

== Teams ==
The teams are listed as follows:

Skip	Third	Second	Lead	Alternate	Club
Ted Appelman	Nathan Connolly	Kevin Tym	Eric Richard	Aaron Sluchinski	Avonair CC, Edmonton
Jeremy Harty	Kyler Kleibrink	Joshua Kiist	Kurtis Goller		The Glencoe Club, Calgary
Ryan Jacques	Desmond Young	Andrew Gittis	Gabriel Dyck		Saville Community SC, Edmonton
Kevin Koe	B. J. Neufeld	John Morris	Ben Hebert		The Glencoe Club, Calgary
Parker Konschuh	Craig Bourgonje	Landon Bucholz	Bryce Bucholz	Rob Bucholz	Derrick WC, Edmonton
Nathan Molberg	Aaron Power	Benjamin Helston	Morgan Bilassy		St. Albert CC, St. Albert
Ryan Parent	Zachary Pawliuk	Braden Pelech	John Ritchie	Jared Jenkins	Crestwood CC, Edmonton
Jeff Reich	Richard Clark	David Thompson	Brent Diduck	Blair Jarvis	Oilsands CC, Fort McMurray
Karsten Sturmay	Tristan Steinke	Chris Kennedy	Glenn Venance	Caleb Boorse	Saville Community SC, Edmonton
Evan van Amsterdam	Cole Adams	Tyler van Amsterdam	Nicholas Duivenvoodre	Tyson Toews	Thistle CC, Edmonton
Scott Webb	Tracy Steinke	Jordan Steinke	Andrew Dunbar	Mark Heartt	Sexsmith CC, Sexsmith

== Knockout brackets ==
=== A event ===
First Knockout	Qualifier 1
Kevin Koe	7
Parker Konschuh	6	Parker Konschuh	2
Ryan Parent	5	Kevin Koe	8
Jeremy Harty	4
Jeremy Harty	9
Nathan Molberg	4
Kevin Koe	9
Karsten Sturmay	1
Karsten Sturmay	8
Ted Appelman	8	Ted Appelman	5
Jeff Reich	7	Karsten Sturmay	7
Scott Webb	5
Ryan Jacques	8
Evan van Amsterdam	4	Scott Webb	10
Scott Webb	9

=== B event ===
Second Knockout	Qualifier 2
Scott Webb	10
Ryan Parent	9	Ryan Parent	2
Nathan Molberg	8	Scott Webb	1
Jeremy Harty	7
Jeremy Harty	8
Jeff Reich	4	Ryan Jacques	3
Ryan Jacques	9	Jeremy Harty	9
Karsten Sturmay	3
Parker Konschuh	7
Evan van Amsterdam	3	Ted Appelman	12
Ted Appelman	6	Ted Appelman	6
Karsten Sturmay	9

=== C event ===
Third Knockout				Qualifier 3
		Ryan Parent	6
Evan van Amsterdam	2	Ryan Jacques	7
Ryan Jacques	8			Ryan Jacques	5
				Karsten Sturmay	8

Third Knockout				Qualifier 4
		Ted Appelman	10
Nathan Molberg	7	Jeff Reich	1
Jeff Reich	8			Ted Appelman	9
				Scott Webb	3
		Parker Konschuh	4
		Scott Webb	6

== Knockout results ==
All draw times are listed in Mountain Time (UTC-07:00).

=== Draw 1 ===
Monday, January 3, 2:00 pm

Sheet A	1	2	3	4	5	6	7	8	9	10	Final
Ted Appelman	0	0	0	2	0	3	0	2	0	1	8
Jeff Reich	1	1	0	0	2	0	2	0	1	0	7

Sheet C	1	2	3	4	5	6	7	8	9	10	Final
Parker Konschuh	0	3	0	2	0	0	0	0	0	1	6
Ryan Parent	0	0	2	0	0	0	2	0	1	0	5

Sheet D	1	2	3	4	5	6	7	8	9	10	Final
Evan van Amsterdam	0	0	0	2	0	1	0	1	X	X	4
Scott Webb	2	1	2	0	3	0	1	0	X	X	9

=== Draw 2 ===
Tuesday, January 4, 9:00 am

Sheet A	1	2	3	4	5	6	7	8	9	10	Final
Jeremy Harty	1	1	0	4	0	0	3	X	X	X	9
Nathan Molberg	0	0	1	0	2	1	0	X	X	X	4

Sheet B	1	2	3	4	5	6	7	8	9	10	Final
Kevin Koe	0	4	0	2	1	0	X	X	X	X	7
Parker Konschuh	0	0	1	0	0	1	X	X	X	X	2

Sheet C	1	2	3	4	5	6	7	8	9	10	Final
Ryan Jacques	1	1	1	0	2	0	0	3	0	0	8
Scott Webb	0	0	0	1	0	5	2	0	0	2	10

Sheet D	1	2	3	4	5	6	7	8	9	10	Final
Karsten Sturmay	1	2	0	2	0	1	0	1	0	1	8
Ted Appelman	0	0	1	0	1	0	1	0	2	0	5

=== Draw 3 ===
Tuesday, January 4, 7:00 pm

Sheet A	1	2	3	4	5	6	7	8	9	10	Final
Evan van Amsterdam	0	0	1	0	1	0	0	0	1	X	3
Ted Appelman	0	2	0	1	0	0	2	1	0	X	6

Sheet B	1	2	3	4	5	6	7	8	9	10	Final
Jeff Reich	1	0	1	1	0	0	1	0	0	0	4
Ryan Jacques	0	0	0	0	3	2	0	0	1	3	9

Sheet D	1	2	3	4	5	6	7	8	9	10	Final
Ryan Parent	4	0	0	1	0	3	0	1	0	0	9
Nathan Molberg	0	1	0	0	2	0	2	0	2	1	8

=== Draw 4 ===
Wednesday, January 5, 9:00 am

Sheet B	1	2	3	4	5	6	7	8	9	10	Final
Karsten Sturmay	1	1	1	0	3	0	1	0	0	X	7
Scott Webb	0	0	0	2	0	2	0	0	1	X	5

Sheet D	1	2	3	4	5	6	7	8	9	10	Final
Kevin Koe	1	0	0	2	0	3	0	0	2	X	8
Jeremy Harty	0	1	1	0	1	0	0	1	0	X	4

=== Draw 5 ===
Wednesday, January 5, 7:00 pm

Sheet A	1	2	3	4	5	6	7	8	9	10	Final
Jeremy Harty	0	0	3	3	0	0	0	1	1	X	8
Ryan Jacques	0	1	0	0	0	1	1	0	0	X	3

Sheet B	1	2	3	4	5	6	7	8	9	10	Final
Parker Konschuh	0	0	1	0	4	0	2	0	0	X	7
Ted Appelman	0	1	0	3	0	2	0	4	2	X	12

Sheet C	1	2	3	4	5	6	7	8	9	10	Final
Scott Webb	3	0	2	0	1	4	X	X	X	X	10
Ryan Parent	0	1	0	1	0	0	X	X	X	X	2

=== Draw 6 ===
Thursday, January 6, 9:00 am

Sheet A	1	2	3	4	5	6	7	8	9	10	11	Final
Nathan Molberg	0	0	0	3	0	2	1	0	1	0	0	7
Jeff Reich	0	3	1	0	2	0	0	0	0	1	1	8

Sheet B	1	2	3	4	5	6	7	8	9	10	Final
Evan van Amsterdam	0	0	0	1	0	0	1	0	X	X	2
Ryan Jacques	0	0	1	0	2	3	0	2	X	X	8

Sheet C	1	2	3	4	5	6	7	8	9	10	Final
Kevin Koe	3	0	2	0	3	1	X	X	X	X	9
Karsten Sturmay	0	1	0	0	0	0	X	X	X	X	1

=== Draw 7 ===
Thursday, January 6, 7:00 pm

Sheet A	1	2	3	4	5	6	7	8	9	10	11	Final
Ted Appelman	0	2	0	1	0	0	0	1	0	2	0	6
Karsten Sturmay	1	0	1	0	0	1	1	0	2	0	3	9

Sheet C	1	2	3	4	5	6	7	8	9	10	Final
Scott Webb	0	0	0	0	1	0	X	X	X	X	1
Jeremy Harty	3	1	1	1	0	1	X	X	X	X	7

=== Draw 8 ===
Friday, January 7, 9:00 am

Sheet A	1	2	3	4	5	6	7	8	9	10	Final
Parker Konschuh	0	1	0	2	0	0	0	0	1	X	4
Scott Webb	1	0	2	0	0	2	0	1	0	X	6

Sheet B	1	2	3	4	5	6	7	8	9	10	Final
Jeremy Harty	2	0	4	0	1	0	1	1	X	X	9
Karsten Sturmay	0	1	0	1	0	1	0	0	X	X	3

Sheet C	1	2	3	4	5	6	7	8	9	10	Final
Ted Appelman	2	2	2	0	4	X	X	X	X	X	10
Jeff Reich	0	0	0	1	0	X	X	X	X	X	1

Sheet D	1	2	3	4	5	6	7	8	9	10	11	Final
Ryan Parent	0	2	0	1	1	0	0	2	0	0	0	6
Ryan Jacques	0	0	1	0	0	1	1	0	2	1	1	7

=== Draw 9 ===
Friday, January 7, 7:00 pm

Sheet A	1	2	3	4	5	6	7	8	9	10	Final
Ted Appelman	2	0	4	0	0	2	1	X	X	X	9
Scott Webb	0	1	0	2	0	0	0	X	X	X	3

Sheet C	1	2	3	4	5	6	7	8	9	10	Final
Ryan Jacques	0	0	0	0	0	3	0	1	1	0	5
Karsten Sturmay	0	0	2	1	2	0	2	0	0	1	8

== Playoffs ==
Page playoff system
A	Kevin Koe	10
B	Jeremy Harty	3
C1	Karsten Sturmay	1
C2	Ted Appelman	7

Semifinal
B	Jeremy Harty	6
C2	Ted Appelman	7

Final
A	Kevin Koe	8
C2	Ted Appelman	4

=== A vs. B ===
Saturday, January 8, 9:00 am

Sheet A	1	2	3	4	5	6	7	8	9	10	Final
Kevin Koe	2	0	4	0	2	2	X	X	X	X	10
Jeremy Harty	0	1	0	2	0	0	X	X	X	X	3

=== C1 vs. C2 ===
Saturday, January 8, 9:00 am

Sheet D	1	2	3	4	5	6	7	8	9	10	Final
Karsten Sturmay	0	0	0	0	0	0	1	0	X	X	1
Ted Appelman	0	1	0	1	1	1	0	3	X	X	7

=== Semifinal ===
Saturday, January 8, 8:00 pm

Sheet B	1	2	3	4	5	6	7	8	9	10	Final
Jeremy Harty	0	0	0	0	1	0	2	0	2	1	6
Ted Appelman	1	0	1	1	0	1	0	3	0	0	7

=== Final ===
Sunday, January 9, 4:30 pm

Sheet B	1	2	3	4	5	6	7	8	9	10	Final
Kevin Koe	2	0	2	0	2	0	2	0	X	X	8
Ted Appelman	0	1	0	1	0	1	0	1	X	X	4

2022 Boston Pizza Cup

Kevin Koe
7th Alberta Provincial Championship title
