= 2023 Saville Shootout =

- Host city: Edmonton, Alberta
- Arena: Saville Community Sports Centre
- Dates: September 8–11
- Men's winner: (Alberta) Team Bottcher
- Curling club: The Glencoe Club, Calgary
- Skip: Brendan Bottcher
- Third: Marc Kennedy
- Second: Brett Gallant
- Lead: Ben Hebert
- Coach: Paul Webster
- Finalist: (British Columbia) Catlin Schneider
- Women's winner: (Ontario) Team Homan
- Curling club: Ottawa CC, Ottawa
- Skip: Heather Nedohin
- Third: Tracy Fleury
- Second: Emma Miskew
- Lead: Sarah Wilkes
- Coach: Don Bartlett
- Finalist: (Manitoba) Team Jones

The 2023 Saville Shootout was held from September 8 to 11 at the Saville Community Sports Centre in Edmonton, Alberta. The event was held in a round robin format with a $25,000 purse on both the men's and women's sides. The men's event was held for the first time since 2015.

Brendan Bottcher and his team of Marc Kennedy, Brett Gallant and Ben Hebert out of Calgary won the men's title, defeating Catlin Schneider's Victoria based rink 4–2 in the final. Bottcher scored two in the second end which ended up being the only deuce of the game. The two teams traded singles through the second half with the Alberta side running Schneider out of rocks in the eighth end. To reach the final, Team Bottcher finished 4–1 through the round robin. They then won 9–0 over Aaron Sluchinski in the quarterfinal and 5–3 against Johnson Tao in the semifinal. Team Schneider also finished 4–1 before defeating Ryan Wiebe 8–6 in the quarterfinal and Mike McEwen 6–5 in the semifinal. Karsten Sturmay and Yusuke Morozumi rounded out the playoff picture.

The women's final saw a rematch of the 2022 final between Homan and Jones, however, with alternate skips leading their lineups. Heather Nedohin skipped the Homan rink with Rachel Homan on maternity leave while Chelsea Carey filled in for Jennifer Jones. The Jones rink had early control of the match, leading 5–2 after five. Costly mistakes down the stretch, however, allowed Homan to pull ahead with a steal of two in the seventh, eventually going on to win 7–6 in an extra end. Nedohin, skipping the Homan rink of Tracy Fleury, Emma Miskew and Sarah Wilkes went an undefeated 8–0 through the weekend, scoring playoff wins over Jessie Hunkin and Kate Cameron in the quarterfinals and semifinals respectively. Carey led the Jones team of Karlee Burgess, Emily Zacharias and Lauren Lenentine to the playoffs with a 4–1 record where they won 7–1 over Satsuki Fujisawa in the quarters and edge Serena Gray-Withers 9–6 in the semis. Corryn Brown and Kerri Einarson both lost in the quarterfinals.

== Men ==
=== Teams ===
The teams are listed as follows:

Skip	Third	Second	Lead	Alternate	Locale
Cole Adams	Derek Bowyer	Tyson Toews	– (Note: Team Adams played with three players.)		Calgary, Alberta
Brendan Bottcher	Marc Kennedy	Brett Gallant	Ben Hebert		Calgary, Alberta
Alex Champ	Charlie Richard	Austin Snyder	Scott Clinton		Toronto, Ontario
Zachary Davies	Ronan Peterson	William Butler	Adam Naugler		Edmonton, Alberta
Ryan Jacques	Evan van Amsterdam	Andrew Gittis	Gabriel Dyck		Edmonton, Alberta
Kyler Kleibrink	Sébastien Robillard	Andrew Nerpin	Jordan Tardi		Langley, British Columbia
Jacob Libbus	Nathan Molberg	Zachary Pawliuk	Michael Henricks		Okotoks, Alberta
Mike McEwen	Colton Flasch	Kevin Marsh	Dan Marsh		Saskatoon, Saskatchewan
Yusuke Morozumi	Yuta Matsumura	Ryotaro Shukuya	Masaki Iwai	Kosuke Morozumi	Karuizawa, Japan
Ryan Parent	James Ballance	Tyler Powell	Ethan Drysdale		Calgary, Alberta
Catlin Schneider	Sterling Middleton	Jason Ginter	Alex Horvath		Victoria, British Columbia
Aaron Sluchinski	Jeremy Harty	Kerr Drummond	Dylan Webster		Airdrie, Alberta
Karsten Sturmay	Kyle Doering	Glenn Venance	Kurtis Goller	J. D. Lind	St. Albert, Alberta
Johnson Tao	Jaedon Neuert	Benjamin Morin	Andrew Nowell		Edmonton, Alberta
Scott Webb	Tristan Steinke	Chris Kennedy	Jordan Steinke		Grande Prairie, Alberta
Ryan Wiebe	Ty Dilello	Sean Flatt	Adam Flatt		Winnipeg, Manitoba
Kenan Wipf	Michael Keenan	Ky Macaulay	Max Cinnamon		Calgary, Alberta
Riku Yanagisawa	Tsuyoshi Yamaguchi	Takeru Yamamoto	Satoshi Koizumi		Karuizawa, Japan

=== Round robin standings ===
Final Round Robin Standings

Key
Teams to Playoffs

Pool A	W	L	PF	PA
(British Columbia) Catlin Schneider	4	1	43	28
(Alberta) Brendan Bottcher	4	1	34	17
(Manitoba) Ryan Wiebe	4	1	42	22
(Alberta) Scott Webb	2	3	27	39
(Alberta) Jacob Libbus	1	4	22	35
(Alberta) Kenan Wipf	0	5	19	46

Pool B	W	L	PF	PA
(Saskatchewan) Mike McEwen	4	1	37	14
(Japan) Yusuke Morozumi	4	1	28	19
(Japan) Riku Yanagisawa	3	2	25	20
(British Columbia) Kyler Kleibrink	2	3	26	25
(Alberta) Cole Adams	1	4	15	32
(Ontario) Alex Champ	1	4	13	34

Pool C	W	L	PF	PA
(Alberta) Karsten Sturmay	5	0	28	17
(Alberta) Aaron Sluchinski	4	1	32	13
(Alberta) Johnson Tao	3	2	33	21
(Alberta) Ryan Parent	2	3	24	22
(Alberta) Ryan Jacques	1	4	21	34
(Alberta) Zachary Davies	0	5	9	40

=== Round robin results ===
All draw times listed in Mountain Time (UTC−06:00).

==== Draw 2 ====
Friday, September 8, 11:00 am

Sheet 6	1	2	3	4	5	6	7	8	Final
(British Columbia) Catlin Schneider 🔨	2	0	2	0	2	3	X	X	9
(Alberta) Scott Webb	0	1	0	2	0	0	X	X	3

Sheet 7	1	2	3	4	5	6	7	8	Final
(Alberta) Brendan Bottcher	1	0	2	1	0	1	2	X	7
(Alberta) Kenan Wipf 🔨	0	1	0	0	1	0	0	X	2

Sheet 8	1	2	3	4	5	6	7	8	Final
(Manitoba) Ryan Wiebe 🔨	2	1	0	2	2	0	X	X	7
(Alberta) Jacob Libbus	0	0	1	0	0	1	X	X	2

Sheet 9	1	2	3	4	5	6	7	8	Final
(Japan) Yusuke Morozumi 🔨	0	0	2	0	2	2	2	X	8
(British Columbia) Kyler Kleibrink	2	1	0	1	0	0	0	X	4

Sheet 10	1	2	3	4	5	6	7	8	Final
(Japan) Riku Yanagisawa	2	0	0	1	0	2	3	X	8
(Alberta) Cole Adams 🔨	0	0	1	0	1	0	0	X	2

==== Draw 3 ====
Friday, September 8, 12:30 pm

Sheet 2	1	2	3	4	5	6	7	8	Final
(Saskatchewan) Mike McEwen 🔨	2	0	1	0	2	5	X	X	10
(Ontario) Alex Champ	0	0	0	1	0	0	X	X	1

Sheet 3	1	2	3	4	5	6	7	8	Final
(Alberta) Ryan Jacques	0	1	1	0	0	0	X	X	2
(Alberta) Ryan Parent 🔨	1	0	0	4	0	3	X	X	8

Sheet 4	1	2	3	4	5	6	7	8	9	Final
(Alberta) Karsten Sturmay	0	0	0	1	0	1	0	1	1	4
(Alberta) Zachary Davies 🔨	1	0	1	0	0	0	1	0	0	3

Sheet 5	1	2	3	4	5	6	7	8	Final
(Alberta) Aaron Sluchinski	0	2	0	0	2	0	0	1	5
(Alberta) Johnson Tao 🔨	0	0	2	0	0	0	1	0	3

==== Draw 6 ====
Friday, September 8, 7:00 pm

Sheet 6	1	2	3	4	5	6	7	8	Final
(Alberta) Brendan Bottcher 🔨	1	0	0	0	6	X	X	X	7
(Alberta) Jacob Libbus	0	1	0	0	0	X	X	X	1

Sheet 7	1	2	3	4	5	6	7	8	Final
(Manitoba) Ryan Wiebe 🔨	2	0	2	0	0	5	3	X	12
(Alberta) Scott Webb	0	3	0	2	1	0	0	X	6

Sheet 8	1	2	3	4	5	6	7	8	Final
(British Columbia) Catlin Schneider 🔨	2	0	6	0	1	0	3	X	12
(Alberta) Kenan Wipf	0	2	0	2	0	2	0	X	6

Sheet 9	1	2	3	4	5	6	7	8	Final
(Japan) Riku Yanagisawa 🔨	1	0	1	0	1	0	2	0	5
(Ontario) Alex Champ	0	0	0	2	0	3	0	1	6

Sheet 10	1	2	3	4	5	6	7	8	Final
(Saskatchewan) Mike McEwen 🔨	1	1	0	2	1	0	0	2	7
(British Columbia) Kyler Kleibrink	0	0	2	0	0	1	1	0	4

==== Draw 7 ====
Friday, September 8, 8:30 pm

Sheet 2	1	2	3	4	5	6	7	8	Final
(Japan) Yusuke Morozumi 🔨	2	1	1	1	X	X	X	X	5
(Alberta) Cole Adams	0	0	0	0	X	X	X	X	0

Sheet 3	1	2	3	4	5	6	7	8	Final
(Alberta) Karsten Sturmay	0	0	3	0	3	0	0	X	6
(Alberta) Johnson Tao 🔨	1	0	0	1	0	0	2	X	4

Sheet 4	1	2	3	4	5	6	7	8	Final
(Alberta) Aaron Sluchinski	0	0	0	3	0	5	X	X	8
(Alberta) Ryan Parent 🔨	1	0	0	0	1	0	X	X	2

Sheet 5	1	2	3	4	5	6	7	8	Final
(Alberta) Ryan Jacques 🔨	2	0	2	5	0	X	X	X	9
(Alberta) Zachary Davies	0	2	0	0	1	X	X	X	3

==== Draw 9 ====
Saturday, September 9, 11:00 am

Sheet 1	1	2	3	4	5	6	7	8	Final
(Manitoba) Ryan Wiebe 🔨	2	1	2	0	2	0	3	X	10
(Alberta) Kenan Wipf	0	0	0	2	0	1	0	X	3

Sheet 2	1	2	3	4	5	6	7	8	Final
(Alberta) Brendan Bottcher	0	0	2	0	0	4	0	1	7
(British Columbia) Catlin Schneider 🔨	0	1	0	0	2	0	1	0	4

Sheet 3	1	2	3	4	5	6	7	8	Final
(Alberta) Jacob Libbus	0	2	0	0	1	0	0	X	3
(Alberta) Scott Webb 🔨	0	0	2	3	0	0	3	X	8

Sheet 4	1	2	3	4	5	6	7	8	Final
(Saskatchewan) Mike McEwen	1	0	3	1	4	X	X	X	9
(Alberta) Cole Adams 🔨	0	2	0	0	0	X	X	X	2

Sheet 5	1	2	3	4	5	6	7	8	Final
(Japan) Riku Yanagisawa 🔨	2	0	0	1	0	2	0	2	7
(Japan) Yusuke Morozumi	0	1	1	0	1	0	0	0	3

==== Draw 10 ====
Saturday, September 9, 12:30 pm

Sheet 6	1	2	3	4	5	6	7	8	Final
(Ontario) Alex Champ	0	0	0	0	0	X	X	X	0
(British Columbia) Kyler Kleibrink 🔨	3	0	3	1	1	X	X	X	8

Sheet 7	1	2	3	4	5	6	7	8	Final
(Alberta) Aaron Sluchinski 🔨	1	1	4	1	0	X	X	X	7
(Alberta) Zachary Davies	0	0	0	0	1	X	X	X	1

Sheet 8	1	2	3	4	5	6	7	8	Final
(Alberta) Karsten Sturmay	0	0	2	1	1	2	1	X	7
(Alberta) Ryan Jacques 🔨	2	2	0	0	0	0	0	X	4

Sheet 9	1	2	3	4	5	6	7	8	Final
(Alberta) Johnson Tao 🔨	0	1	0	2	0	0	2	1	6
(Alberta) Ryan Parent	1	0	2	0	0	1	0	0	4

==== Draw 13 ====
Saturday, September 9, 7:00 pm

Sheet 1	1	2	3	4	5	6	7	8	Final
(Alberta) Brendan Bottcher	0	2	0	2	2	3	X	X	9
(Alberta) Scott Webb 🔨	2	0	1	0	0	0	X	X	3

Sheet 2	1	2	3	4	5	6	7	8	Final
(Alberta) Jacob Libbus	2	0	4	1	3	X	X	X	10
(Alberta) Kenan Wipf 🔨	0	2	0	0	0	X	X	X	2

Sheet 3	1	2	3	4	5	6	7	8	Final
(Manitoba) Ryan Wiebe 🔨	2	0	1	1	0	1	1	0	6
(British Columbia) Catlin Schneider	0	3	0	0	2	0	0	2	7

Sheet 4	1	2	3	4	5	6	7	8	9	Final
(Japan) Riku Yanagisawa 🔨	1	0	1	0	0	0	1	0	1	4
(British Columbia) Kyler Kleibrink	0	1	0	0	0	1	0	1	0	3

Sheet 5	1	2	3	4	5	6	7	8	Final
(Ontario) Alex Champ	0	0	1	0	2	0	0	X	3
(Alberta) Cole Adams 🔨	0	2	0	1	0	1	1	X	5

==== Draw 14 ====
Saturday, September 9, 8:30 pm

Sheet 6	1	2	3	4	5	6	7	8	9	Final
(Saskatchewan) Mike McEwen	0	0	0	2	0	0	2	1	0	5
(Japan) Yusuke Morozumi 🔨	1	1	1	0	1	1	0	0	1	6

Sheet 7	1	2	3	4	5	6	7	8	Final
(Alberta) Karsten Sturmay 🔨	3	0	1	1	1	0	X	X	6
(Alberta) Ryan Parent	0	1	0	0	0	1	X	X	2

Sheet 8	1	2	3	4	5	6	7	8	Final
(Alberta) Johnson Tao	0	3	4	0	5	X	X	X	12
(Alberta) Zachary Davies 🔨	1	0	0	1	0	X	X	X	2

Sheet 9	1	2	3	4	5	6	7	8	Final
(Alberta) Aaron Sluchinski	1	0	0	1	0	6	X	X	8
(Alberta) Ryan Jacques 🔨	0	1	0	0	1	0	X	X	2

==== Draw 16 ====
Sunday, September 10, 2:00 pm

Sheet 2	1	2	3	4	5	6	7	8	Final
(Alberta) Karsten Sturmay 🔨	0	2	0	0	0	2	0	1	5
(Alberta) Aaron Sluchinski	0	0	1	0	2	0	1	0	4

Sheet 3	1	2	3	4	5	6	7	8	Final
(Japan) Yusuke Morozumi 🔨	0	1	0	0	0	2	3	X	6
(Ontario) Alex Champ	0	0	1	1	1	0	0	X	3

Sheet 4	1	2	3	4	5	6	7	8	Final
(Alberta) Scott Webb 🔨	2	0	3	1	0	0	1	0	7
(Alberta) Kenan Wipf	0	2	0	0	2	1	0	1	6

Sheet 5	1	2	3	4	5	6	7	8	Final
(British Columbia) Catlin Schneider 🔨	3	3	0	0	2	0	3	X	11
(Alberta) Jacob Libbus	0	0	1	2	0	3	0	X	6

Sheet 6	1	2	3	4	5	6	7	8	Final
(Japan) Riku Yanagisawa 🔨	0	1	0	0	X	X	X	X	1
(Saskatchewan) Mike McEwen	2	0	3	1	X	X	X	X	6

Sheet 7	1	2	3	4	5	6	7	8	Final
(Alberta) Ryan Jacques	1	0	2	0	1	0	0	X	4
(Alberta) Johnson Tao 🔨	0	1	0	3	0	2	2	X	8

Sheet 8	1	2	3	4	5	6	7	8	Final
(British Columbia) Kyler Kleibrink 🔨	0	2	0	1	2	0	0	2	7
(Alberta) Cole Adams	1	0	3	0	0	0	2	0	6

Sheet 9	1	2	3	4	5	6	7	8	Final
(Alberta) Brendan Bottcher 🔨	1	0	1	0	2	0	0	0	4
(Manitoba) Ryan Wiebe	0	1	0	1	0	3	1	1	7

Sheet 10	1	2	3	4	5	6	7	8	Final
(Alberta) Ryan Parent 🔨	0	1	1	5	1	X	X	X	8
(Alberta) Zachary Davies	0	0	0	0	0	X	X	X	0

=== Playoffs ===
Quarterfinals
1	(Alberta) Karsten Sturmay	5
8	(Alberta) Johnson Tao	7
4	(Alberta) Aaron Sluchinski	0
5	(Alberta) Brendan Bottcher	9
2	(British Columbia) Catlin Schneider	8
7	(Manitoba) Ryan Wiebe	6
3	(Saskatchewan) Mike McEwen	6
6	(Japan) Yusuke Morozumi	5

Semifinals
8	(Alberta) Johnson Tao	3
5	(Alberta) Brendan Bottcher	5
2	(British Columbia) Catlin Schneider	6
3	(Saskatchewan) Mike McEwen	5

Final
5	(Alberta) Brendan Bottcher	4
2	(British Columbia) Catlin Schneider	2

==== Quarterfinals ====
Monday, September 11, 8:30 am

Sheet 3	1	2	3	4	5	6	7	8	Final
(Alberta) Karsten Sturmay 🔨	2	0	0	1	0	0	2	0	5
(Alberta) Johnson Tao	0	1	2	0	2	1	0	1	7

Sheet 5	1	2	3	4	5	6	7	8	Final
(Alberta) Aaron Sluchinski	0	0	X	X	X	X	X	X	0
(Alberta) Brendan Bottcher 🔨	5	4	X	X	X	X	X	X	9

Sheet 7	1	2	3	4	5	6	7	8	Final
(British Columbia) Catlin Schneider	0	1	0	2	0	3	0	2	8
(Manitoba) Ryan Wiebe 🔨	0	0	1	0	2	0	3	0	6

Sheet 9	1	2	3	4	5	6	7	8	9	Final
(Saskatchewan) Mike McEwen 🔨	0	2	0	0	2	0	0	1	1	6
(Japan) Yusuke Morozumi	0	0	2	1	0	2	0	0	0	5

==== Semifinals ====
Monday, September 11, 12:00 pm

Sheet 4	1	2	3	4	5	6	7	8	Final
(British Columbia) Catlin Schneider	0	0	2	2	0	1	0	1	6
(Saskatchewan) Mike McEwen 🔨	1	2	0	0	1	0	1	0	5

Sheet 8	1	2	3	4	5	6	7	8	Final
(Alberta) Johnson Tao	0	0	0	2	0	0	1	0	3
(Alberta) Brendan Bottcher 🔨	1	0	1	0	0	2	0	1	5

==== Final ====
Monday, September 11, 3:30 pm

Sheet 6	1	2	3	4	5	6	7	8	Final
(Alberta) Brendan Bottcher 🔨	0	2	0	0	1	0	1	X	4
(British Columbia) Catlin Schneider	0	0	0	1	0	1	0	X	2

== Women ==
=== Teams ===
The teams are listed as follows:

Skip	Third	Second	Lead	Alternate	Locale
Sarah Anderson	Taylor Anderson	Lexi Lanigan	Aileen Geving (Note: Aileen Geving spared for Leah Yavarow.)		(United States) Minneapolis, Minnesota
Corryn Brown	Erin Pincott	Jennifer Armstrong	Samantha Fisher		Kamloops, British Columbia
Kate Cameron	Meghan Walter	Taylor McDonald	Mackenzie Elias		Winnipeg, Manitoba
Kerri Einarson	Val Sweeting	Shannon Birchard	Briane Harris		Gimli, Manitoba
Satsuki Fujisawa	Chinami Yoshida	Yumi Suzuki	Yurika Yoshida	Kotomi Ishizaki	Kitami, Japan
Jo-Ann Rizzo (Fourth)	Sarah Koltun	Margot Flemming	Kerry Galusha (Skip)		Yellowknife, Northwest Territories
Gim Eun-ji	Seol Ye-ji (Note: Alternate Seol Ye-ji played third, replacing Kim Min-ji.)	Kim Su-ji	Seol Ye-eun		Uijeongbu, South Korea
Clancy Grandy	Kayla MacMillan	Lindsay Dubue	– (Note: Team Grandy played with three players.)		Vancouver, British Columbia
Serena Gray-Withers	Catherine Clifford	Brianna Cullen	Zoe Cinnamon		Edmonton, Alberta
Michelle Hartwell	Jessica Monk	Erica Wiese	Ashley Kalk		Sherwood Park, Alberta
Heather Nedohin (Note: Heather Nedohin spared for Rachel Homan who was on maternity leave.)	Tracy Fleury	Emma Miskew	Sarah Wilkes		Ottawa, Ontario
Jessie Hunkin	Jessie Haughian	Becca Hebert	Dayna Demmans		Spruce Grove, Alberta
Chelsea Carey (Note: Chelsea Carey spared for Jennifer Jones.)	Karlee Burgess	Emily Zacharias	Lauren Lenentine		Winnipeg, Manitoba
Kaitlyn Lawes	Selena Njegovan	Jocelyn Peterman	Kristin MacCuish		Winnipeg, Manitoba
Abby Marks	Elysa Crough	Kim Bonneau	Julianna Mackenzie		Edmonton, Alberta
Lindsay Bertsch (Note: Third Lindsay Bertsch skipped the team.)	Madison Kleiter	?	Krysten Karwacki		Martensville, Saskatchewan
Gracelyn Richards	Sophia Ryhorchuk	Rachel Jacques	Amy Wheatcroft		Edmonton, Alberta
Kayla Skrlik	Brittany Tran	Geri-Lynn Ramsay	Ashton Skrlik		Calgary, Alberta
Selena Sturmay	Danielle Schmiemann	Dezaray Hawes	Paige Papley		Edmonton, Alberta
Momoha Tabata	Miku Nihira	Sae Yamamoto	Mikoto Nakajima	Ayami Ito	Sapporo, Japan

=== Round robin standings ===
Final Round Robin Standings

Key
Teams to Playoffs

Pool A	W	L	PF	PA
(Manitoba) Kerri Einarson	4	1	35	22
(Manitoba) Kate Cameron	4	1	26	18
(Alberta) Selena Sturmay	2	3	24	30
(Alberta) Abby Marks	2	3	31	29
(Alberta) Kayla Skrlik	1	4	23	35

Pool B	W	L	PF	PA
(Ontario) Team Homan	5	0	31	18
(Alberta) Jessie Hunkin	3	2	27	24
(Northwest Territories) Kerry Galusha	2	3	25	21
(British Columbia) Clancy Grandy	2	3	21	26
(Alberta) Gracelyn Richards	0	5	16	36

Pool C	W	L	PF	PA
(British Columbia) Corryn Brown	4	1	29	23
(Japan) Satsuki Fujisawa	3	2	34	19
(Manitoba) Kaitlyn Lawes	3	2	29	22
(United States) Sarah Anderson	3	2	27	32
(Alberta) Michelle Hartwell	1	4	25	35

Pool D	W	L	PF	PA
(Manitoba) Team Jones	4	1	32	20
(Alberta) Serena Gray-Withers	3	2	29	28
(South Korea) Gim Eun-ji	3	2	31	18
(Japan) Momoha Tabata	1	4	18	36
(Saskatchewan) Team Martin	0	5	15	36

=== Round robin results ===
All draw times listed in Mountain Time (UTC−06:00).

==== Draw 1 ====
Friday, September 8, 8:30 am

Sheet 1	1	2	3	4	5	6	7	8	Final
(Alberta) Abby Marks	2	1	1	0	3	0	4	X	11
(Alberta) Kayla Skrlik 🔨	0	0	0	2	0	2	0	X	4

Sheet 2	1	2	3	4	5	6	7	8	Final
(Manitoba) Kerri Einarson 🔨	2	4	0	0	3	0	0	X	9
(Alberta) Gracelyn Richards	0	0	2	1	0	2	0	X	5

Sheet 3	1	2	3	4	5	6	7	8	Final
(Manitoba) Kate Cameron 🔨	1	0	0	2	0	1	0	1	5
(Alberta) Selena Sturmay	0	1	0	0	2	0	1	0	4

Sheet 4	1	2	3	4	5	6	7	8	Final
(Ontario) Team Homan 🔨	2	0	0	1	1	0	2	X	6
(Alberta) Jessie Hunkin	0	1	2	0	0	1	0	X	4

Sheet 5	1	2	3	4	5	6	7	8	Final
(Northwest Territories) Kerry Galusha 🔨	0	3	0	0	1	5	X	X	9
(British Columbia) Clancy Grandy	0	0	1	0	0	0	X	X	1

==== Draw 4 ====
Friday, September 8, 3:00 pm

Sheet 6	1	2	3	4	5	6	7	8	Final
(Alberta) Serena Gray-Withers 🔨	2	1	0	0	2	1	0	4	10
(Japan) Momoha Tabata	0	0	3	1	0	0	2	0	6

Sheet 7	1	2	3	4	5	6	7	8	Final
(British Columbia) Corryn Brown 🔨	2	3	0	2	0	0	0	X	7
(Alberta) Michelle Hartwell	0	0	2	0	1	1	1	X	5

Sheet 8	1	2	3	4	5	6	7	8	Final
(Manitoba) Team Jones	0	1	0	1	0	3	0	2	7
(South Korea) Gim Eun-ji 🔨	0	0	3	0	1	0	1	0	5

Sheet 9	1	2	3	4	5	6	7	8	Final
(Manitoba) Kaitlyn Lawes 🔨	1	2	1	0	1	2	X	X	7
(Saskatchewan) Team Martin	0	0	0	2	0	0	X	X	2

Sheet 10	1	2	3	4	5	6	7	8	Final
(United States) Sarah Anderson	0	0	2	0	1	1	0	2	6
(Japan) Satsuki Fujisawa 🔨	1	1	0	1	0	0	1	0	4

==== Draw 5 ====
Friday, September 8, 4:30 pm

Sheet 1	1	2	3	4	5	6	7	8	Final
(Manitoba) Kate Cameron 🔨	1	1	1	2	2	X	X	X	7
(Northwest Territories) Kerry Galusha	0	0	0	0	0	X	X	X	0

Sheet 2	1	2	3	4	5	6	7	8	Final
(Alberta) Selena Sturmay 🔨	3	0	0	3	0	1	0	X	7
(Alberta) Abby Marks	0	1	1	0	1	0	1	X	4

Sheet 3	1	2	3	4	5	6	7	8	Final
(British Columbia) Clancy Grandy	0	0	0	0	0	0	X	X	0
(Ontario) Team Homan 🔨	1	0	1	1	2	2	X	X	7

Sheet 4	1	2	3	4	5	6	7	8	Final
(Alberta) Kayla Skrlik	0	1	0	0	1	0	3	0	5
(Manitoba) Kerri Einarson 🔨	1	0	0	1	0	1	0	3	6

Sheet 5	1	2	3	4	5	6	7	8	Final
(Alberta) Jessie Hunkin 🔨	0	0	2	0	3	2	0	X	7
(Alberta) Gracelyn Richards	0	2	0	1	0	0	1	X	4

==== Draw 8 ====
Saturday, September 9, 8:30 am

Sheet 6	1	2	3	4	5	6	7	8	Final
(Alberta) Michelle Hartwell	0	0	3	0	1	0	2	0	6
(United States) Sarah Anderson 🔨	2	1	0	1	0	2	0	2	8

Sheet 7	1	2	3	4	5	6	7	8	Final
(Japan) Satsuki Fujisawa	2	1	0	3	3	X	X	X	9
(Japan) Momoha Tabata 🔨	0	0	1	0	0	X	X	X	1

Sheet 8	1	2	3	4	5	6	7	8	Final
(Manitoba) Kaitlyn Lawes 🔨	0	2	0	3	0	0	0	X	5
(British Columbia) Corryn Brown	0	0	1	0	0	1	1	X	3

Sheet 9	1	2	3	4	5	6	7	8	Final
(South Korea) Gim Eun-ji	0	2	1	0	0	0	1	0	4
(Alberta) Serena Gray-Withers 🔨	2	0	0	1	0	1	0	1	5

Sheet 10	1	2	3	4	5	6	7	8	Final
(Saskatchewan) Team Martin	0	1	1	0	2	0	0	1	5
(Manitoba) Team Jones 🔨	1	0	0	3	0	2	1	0	7

==== Draw 11 ====
Saturday, September 9, 3:00 pm

Sheet 1	1	2	3	4	5	6	7	8	Final
(British Columbia) Clancy Grandy 🔨	2	0	2	1	2	X	X	X	7
(Alberta) Gracelyn Richards	0	1	0	0	0	X	X	X	1

Sheet 2	1	2	3	4	5	6	7	8	Final
(Northwest Territories) Kerry Galusha 🔨	0	1	0	1	0	1	0	1	4
(Ontario) Team Homan	1	0	2	0	1	0	1	0	5

Sheet 3	1	2	3	4	5	6	7	8	Final
(Alberta) Kayla Skrlik	0	0	1	0	2	0	X	X	3
(Alberta) Jessie Hunkin 🔨	4	1	0	1	0	2	X	X	8

Sheet 4	1	2	3	4	5	6	7	8	Final
(Manitoba) Kate Cameron 🔨	0	1	0	3	1	0	0	X	5
(Alberta) Abby Marks	0	0	1	0	0	1	1	X	3

Sheet 5	1	2	3	4	5	6	7	8	Final
(Alberta) Selena Sturmay	0	0	2	1	0	1	0	X	4
(Manitoba) Kerri Einarson 🔨	2	2	0	0	1	0	3	X	8

==== Draw 12 ====
Saturday, September 9, 4:30 pm

Sheet 6	1	2	3	4	5	6	7	8	Final
(British Columbia) Corryn Brown	2	0	1	0	1	0	1	0	5
(Japan) Satsuki Fujisawa 🔨	0	1	0	2	0	0	0	1	4

Sheet 7	1	2	3	4	5	6	7	8	Final
(Saskatchewan) Team Martin	0	0	1	0	0	0	X	X	1
(South Korea) Gim Eun-ji 🔨	0	3	0	1	1	2	X	X	7

Sheet 8	1	2	3	4	5	6	7	8	9	Final
(United States) Sarah Anderson 🔨	0	1	1	0	3	0	0	0	1	6
(Alberta) Serena Gray-Withers	0	0	0	1	0	2	1	1	0	5

Sheet 9	1	2	3	4	5	6	7	8	Final
(Manitoba) Team Jones 🔨	1	0	2	0	3	1	X	X	7
(Japan) Momoha Tabata	0	1	0	1	0	0	X	X	2

Sheet 10	1	2	3	4	5	6	7	8	Final
(Manitoba) Kaitlyn Lawes	1	0	2	0	1	0	1	0	5
(Alberta) Michelle Hartwell 🔨	0	1	0	3	0	1	0	1	6

==== Draw 15 ====
Sunday, September 10, 9:00 am

Sheet 1	1	2	3	4	5	6	7	8	Final
(United States) Sarah Anderson	0	0	1	0	X	X	X	X	1
(Manitoba) Kaitlyn Lawes 🔨	3	3	0	4	X	X	X	X	10

Sheet 2	1	2	3	4	5	6	7	8	Final
(Japan) Momoha Tabata 🔨	2	0	0	0	0	0	X	X	2
(South Korea) Gim Eun-ji	0	1	1	0	1	4	X	X	7

Sheet 3	1	2	3	4	5	6	7	8	Final
(British Columbia) Corryn Brown 🔨	3	0	0	2	1	1	X	X	7
(Manitoba) Team Jones	0	2	1	0	0	0	X	X	3

Sheet 4	1	2	3	4	5	6	7	8	Final
(Alberta) Serena Gray-Withers 🔨	0	0	1	0	2	0	5	X	8
(Saskatchewan) Team Martin	0	1	0	2	0	1	0	X	4

Sheet 5	1	2	3	4	5	6	7	8	Final
(Japan) Satsuki Fujisawa 🔨	1	1	0	2	0	2	0	1	7
(Alberta) Michelle Hartwell	0	0	1	0	2	0	2	0	5

Sheet 6	1	2	3	4	5	6	7	8	Final
(Alberta) Kayla Skrlik 🔨	0	0	1	0	1	2	0	X	4
(Manitoba) Kate Cameron	2	3	0	2	0	0	1	X	8

Sheet 7	1	2	3	4	5	6	7	8	Final
(Alberta) Gracelyn Richards	0	0	1	0	1	0	2	0	4
(Ontario) Team Homan 🔨	1	1	0	1	0	1	0	1	5

Sheet 8	1	2	3	4	5	6	7	8	Final
(Alberta) Selena Sturmay	0	1	0	1	1	0	2	2	7
(British Columbia) Clancy Grandy 🔨	0	0	4	0	0	2	0	0	6

Sheet 9	1	2	3	4	5	6	7	8	Final
(Alberta) Jessie Hunkin	1	0	0	0	1	0	1	3	6
(Northwest Territories) Kerry Galusha 🔨	0	1	0	1	0	2	0	0	4

Sheet 10	1	2	3	4	5	6	7	8	Final
(Manitoba) Kerri Einarson	0	1	0	0	4	0	0	0	5
(Alberta) Abby Marks 🔨	1	0	2	1	0	1	0	2	7

==== Draw 17 ====
Sunday, September 10, 7:00 pm

Sheet 1	1	2	3	4	5	6	7	8	Final
(Manitoba) Kerri Einarson 🔨	0	3	4	0	X	X	X	X	7
(Manitoba) Kate Cameron	0	0	0	1	X	X	X	X	1

Sheet 2	1	2	3	4	5	6	7	8	Final
(Alberta) Jessie Hunkin	0	1	0	0	1	0	X	X	2
(British Columbia) Clancy Grandy 🔨	2	0	1	1	0	3	X	X	7

Sheet 3	1	2	3	4	5	6	7	8	Final
(Alberta) Gracelyn Richards	0	0	0	2	0	0	X	X	2
(Northwest Territories) Kerry Galusha 🔨	2	1	1	0	3	1	X	X	8

Sheet 4	1	2	3	4	5	6	7	8	Final
(Alberta) Kayla Skrlik	2	0	2	0	1	1	1	X	7
(Alberta) Selena Sturmay 🔨	0	1	0	1	0	0	0	X	2

Sheet 5	1	2	3	4	5	6	7	8	Final
(Alberta) Abby Marks	0	2	2	0	1	0	1	0	6
(Ontario) Team Homan 🔨	1	0	0	3	0	3	0	1	8

Sheet 6	1	2	3	4	5	6	7	8	Final
(Japan) Satsuki Fujisawa	0	2	2	0	4	2	X	X	10
(Manitoba) Kaitlyn Lawes 🔨	1	0	0	1	0	0	X	X	2

Sheet 7	1	2	3	4	5	6	7	8	Final
(Alberta) Serena Gray-Withers 🔨	0	0	0	1	0	X	X	X	1
(Manitoba) Team Jones	0	2	2	0	4	X	X	X	8

Sheet 8	1	2	3	4	5	6	7	8	Final
(Japan) Momoha Tabata 🔨	1	0	1	0	2	0	3	X	7
(Saskatchewan) Team Martin	0	1	0	1	0	1	0	X	3

Sheet 9	1	2	3	4	5	6	7	8	9	Final
(United States) Sarah Anderson	0	0	2	0	0	2	1	1	0	6
(British Columbia) Corryn Brown 🔨	2	1	0	2	1	0	0	0	1	7

Sheet 10	1	2	3	4	5	6	7	8	Final
(Alberta) Michelle Hartwell	0	1	0	1	0	1	0	X	3
(South Korea) Gim Eun-ji 🔨	2	0	2	0	2	0	2	X	8

=== Playoffs ===
Quarterfinals
1	(Ontario) Team Homan	5
8	(Alberta) Jessie Hunkin	2
4	(British Columbia) Corryn Brown	7
5	(Manitoba) Kate Cameron	8
2	(Manitoba) Team Jones	7
7	(Japan) Satsuki Fujisawa	1
3	(Manitoba) Kerri Einarson	4
6	(Alberta) Serena Gray-Withers	7

Semifinals
1	(Ontario) Team Homan	8
5	(Manitoba) Kate Cameron	3
2	(Manitoba) Team Jones	9
6	(Alberta) Serena Gray-Withers	6

Final
1	(Ontario) Team Homan	7
2	(Manitoba) Team Jones	6

==== Quarterfinals ====
Monday, September 11, 8:30 am

Sheet 2	1	2	3	4	5	6	7	8	9	Final
(British Columbia) Corryn Brown	0	1	1	0	3	0	2	0	0	7
(Manitoba) Kate Cameron 🔨	1	0	0	2	0	1	0	3	1	8

Sheet 4	1	2	3	4	5	6	7	8	Final
(Ontario) Team Homan 🔨	0	2	1	0	1	0	1	X	5
(Alberta) Jessie Hunkin	0	0	0	1	0	1	0	X	2

Sheet 6	1	2	3	4	5	6	7	8	Final
(Manitoba) Kerri Einarson 🔨	1	0	2	0	0	1	0	0	4
(Alberta) Serena Gray-Withers	0	3	0	1	1	0	1	1	7

Sheet 8	1	2	3	4	5	6	7	8	Final
(Manitoba) Team Jones 🔨	2	2	1	0	2	X	X	X	7
(Japan) Satsuki Fujisawa	0	0	0	1	0	X	X	X	1

==== Semifinals ====
Monday, September 11, 12:00 pm

Sheet 3	1	2	3	4	5	6	7	8	9	Final
(Manitoba) Team Jones 🔨	2	0	0	2	1	0	1	0	3	9
(Alberta) Serena Gray-Withers	0	1	1	0	0	2	0	2	0	6

Sheet 7	1	2	3	4	5	6	7	8	Final
(Ontario) Team Homan 🔨	2	0	1	0	2	2	1	X	8
(Manitoba) Kate Cameron	0	2	0	1	0	0	0	X	3

==== Final ====
Monday, September 11, 3:30 pm

Sheet 5	1	2	3	4	5	6	7	8	9	Final
(Ontario) Team Homan 🔨	1	0	0	1	0	2	2	0	1	7
(Manitoba) Team Jones	0	1	2	0	2	0	0	1	0	6
