= 2022 Champions Cup (curling) =

Grand Slam of Curling event

2022 KIOTI Tractor Champions Cup
- Host city: Olds, Alberta
- Arena: Olds Sportsplex
- Dates: May 3–8
- Men's winner: (Newfoundland and Labrador) Team Gushue
- Curling club: St. John's CC, St. John's
- Skip: Brad Gushue
- Third: Mark Nichols
- Second: Brett Gallant
- Lead: Geoff Walker
- Coach: Jules Owchar
- Finalist: (Alberta) Kevin Koe
- Women's winner: (Manitoba) Team Einarson
- Curling club: Gimli CC, Gimli
- Skip: Kerri Einarson
- Third: Val Sweeting
- Second: Shannon Birchard
- Lead: Briane Meilleur
- Finalist: (South Korea) Gim Eun-ji

The 2022 KIOTI Tractor Champions Cup was held May 3–8 at the Olds Sportsplex in Olds, Alberta. It is the fifth and final Grand Slam event of the 2021–22 curling season.

== Qualification ==
Twelve teams qualified for the Champions Cup through winning different events over the course of the 2021–22 season. Team Brad Jacobs qualified as the Sponsor's Exemption.

=== Men ===
Qualifying Event	Team
2022 Winter Olympics	(Sweden) Niklas Edin
2021 Players' Championship	(Scotland) Bruce Mouat
2021 National	(Newfoundland and Labrador) Brad Gushue
2021 Tim Hortons Brier	(Alberta) Brendan Bottcher
2021 IG Wealth Management Western Showdown	(Alberta) Kevin Koe
2021 United States Men's Curling Championship	(United States) Korey Dropkin
~~2022 Swiss Men's Curling Championship~~	~~(Switzerland) Yannick Schwaller~~
2021 ATB Banff Classic	(Ontario) John Epping
2021 DeKalb Superspiel	(Manitoba) Jason Gunnlaugson
2021 Vesta Energy Curling Classic	(Alberta) Ryan Jacques
2021 Pacific-Asia Curling Championships	(South Korea) Kim Chang-min
Sponsor's Exemption	(Ontario) Brad Jacobs
2022 Alberta Curling Tour Championship	(Alberta) Karsten Sturmay

=== Women ===
Qualifying Event	Team
2021 Players' Championship	(Manitoba) Kerri Einarson
2021 Champions Cup	(Ontario) Rachel Homan
2021 National	(Sweden) Anna Hasselborg
2021 World Women's Curling Championship	(Switzerland) Silvana Tirinzoni
2021 Masters	(Manitoba) Tracy Fleury
2021 Canadian Olympic Curling Trials	(Manitoba) Jennifer Jones
2021 Alberta Curling Series: Saville Shoot-Out	(South Korea) Kim Eun-jung
~~2021 Pacific-Asia Curling Championships~~	~~(Japan) Sayaka Yoshimura~~
2021 United States Women's Curling Championship	(United States) Cory Christensen
2021 DeKalb Superspiel	(Saskatchewan) Amber Holland
2021 Women's Masters Basel	(Denmark) Madeleine Dupont
2021 Curlers Corner Autumn Gold Curling Classic	(United States) Tabitha Peterson
2021 Boundary Ford Curling Classic	(South Korea) Gim Eun-ji

== Men ==
=== Teams ===
The teams are listed as follows:

Skip	Third	Second	Lead	Alternate	Locale
Brendan Bottcher	Pat Janssen	Brad Thiessen	Karrick Martin		Edmonton, Alberta
Korey Dropkin	Tom Howell	Mark Fenner	Alex Fenson	Joe Polo	(United States) Chaska, Minnesota
Niklas Edin	Oskar Eriksson	Rasmus Wranå	Christoffer Sundgren		Karlstad, Sweden
John Epping	Ryan Fry	Mat Camm (DNP)	Brent Laing		Toronto, Ontario
Jason Gunnlaugson	Tyler Tardi (Note: Tyler Tardi spared for Adam Casey.)	Matt Wozniak	Connor Njegovan		Morris, Manitoba
Brad Gushue	Mark Nichols	Brett Gallant	Geoff Walker		St. John's, Newfoundland and Labrador
Brad Jacobs	Marc Kennedy	E. J. Harnden	Ryan Harnden		Sault Ste. Marie, Ontario
Ryan Jacques	Desmond Young	Andrew Gittis	Gabriel Dyck		Edmonton, Alberta
Kim Soo-hyuk	Kim Chang-min	Seong Se-hyeon	Kim Hak-kyun		Uiseong, South Korea
Kevin Koe	John Morris	B. J. Neufeld	Ben Hebert		Calgary, Alberta
Bruce Mouat	Ross Whyte	Bobby Lammie	Hammy McMillan Jr.		Stirling, Scotland
Karsten Sturmay	J. D. Lind	Kyle Doering	Glenn Venance		Edmonton, Alberta

=== Round-robin standings ===
Final round-robin standings

Key
Teams to Playoffs
Teams to Tiebreakers

Pool A	W	L	PF	PA	DSC
(Alberta) Kevin Koe	4	1	39	23	42.2
(Ontario) Brad Jacobs	4	1	31	25	76.5
(Newfoundland and Labrador) Brad Gushue	3	2	31	23	95.1
(Ontario) John Epping	2	3	20	27	381.1
(Alberta) Ryan Jacques	1	4	20	33	244.5
(Alberta) Karsten Sturmay	1	4	20	30	253.5

Pool B	W	L	PF	PA	DSC
(Sweden) Niklas Edin	4	1	28	25	37.0
(Alberta) Brendan Bottcher	3	2	29	24	68.7
(Manitoba) Jason Gunnlaugson	3	2	30	25	103.9
(United States) Korey Dropkin	2	3	26	29	27.0
(South Korea) Kim Soo-hyuk	2	3	23	27	78.6
(Scotland) Bruce Mouat	1	4	23	29	340.2

=== Round-robin results ===
All draw times are listed in Mountain Daylight Time (UTC−06:00).

==== Draw 1 ====
Tuesday, May 3, 1:00 pm

Sheet C	1	2	3	4	5	6	7	8	Final
(Scotland) Bruce Mouat 🔨	2	0	2	0	0	0	1	0	5
(South Korea) Kim Soo-hyuk	0	3	0	1	0	1	0	1	6

Sheet D	1	2	3	4	5	6	7	8	9	Final
(Ontario) Brad Jacobs	0	0	1	0	0	4	0	0	1	6
(Alberta) Karsten Sturmay 🔨	0	2	0	1	1	0	0	1	0	5

==== Draw 2 ====
Tuesday, May 3, 4:30 pm

Sheet C	1	2	3	4	5	6	7	8	Final
(Alberta) Brendan Bottcher	0	0	0	0	2	2	0	1	5
(United States) Korey Dropkin 🔨	0	0	0	2	0	0	1	0	3

Sheet D	1	2	3	4	5	6	7	8	Final
(Alberta) Kevin Koe 🔨	2	2	0	2	2	3	X	X	11
(Alberta) Ryan Jacques	0	0	2	0	0	0	X	X	2

==== Draw 3 ====
Tuesday, May 3, 8:00 pm

Sheet C	1	2	3	4	5	6	7	8	9	Final
(Sweden) Niklas Edin 🔨	0	0	3	0	1	0	0	1	1	6
(Manitoba) Jason Gunnlaugson	0	1	0	2	0	0	2	0	0	5

Sheet D	1	2	3	4	5	6	7	8	Final
(Newfoundland and Labrador) Brad Gushue 🔨	2	0	2	0	1	1	0	1	7
(Ontario) John Epping	0	2	0	1	0	0	1	0	4

==== Draw 4 ====
Wednesday, May 4, 8:30 am

Sheet A	1	2	3	4	5	6	7	8	Final
(Ontario) Brad Jacobs 🔨	5	0	0	1	0	1	0	X	7
(Alberta) Ryan Jacques	0	1	1	0	0	0	2	X	4

Sheet D	1	2	3	4	5	6	7	8	Final
(Alberta) Brendan Bottcher	0	1	0	1	0	2	1	0	5
(South Korea) Kim Soo-hyuk 🔨	2	0	1	0	1	0	0	2	6

==== Draw 5 ====
Wednesday, May 4, 12:00 pm

Sheet A	1	2	3	4	5	6	7	8	Final
(Alberta) Kevin Koe 🔨	1	3	1	0	0	0	2	X	7
(Ontario) John Epping	0	0	0	2	0	1	0	X	3

Sheet D	1	2	3	4	5	6	7	8	9	Final
(Scotland) Bruce Mouat	0	0	0	0	1	0	2	0	0	3
(Manitoba) Jason Gunnlaugson 🔨	0	0	0	1	0	0	0	2	1	4

==== Draw 6 ====
Wednesday, May 4, 4:00 pm

Sheet A	1	2	3	4	5	6	7	8	Final
(Newfoundland and Labrador) Brad Gushue	0	0	1	0	2	0	1	0	4
(Alberta) Karsten Sturmay 🔨	0	2	0	1	0	1	0	1	5

Sheet D	1	2	3	4	5	6	7	8	Final
(Sweden) Niklas Edin	0	0	1	0	3	0	1	1	6
(United States) Korey Dropkin 🔨	1	0	0	1	0	2	0	0	4

==== Draw 7 ====
Wednesday, May 4, 8:00 pm

Sheet A	1	2	3	4	5	6	7	8	Final
(Scotland) Bruce Mouat	0	2	0	2	0	2	0	X	6
(Alberta) Brendan Bottcher 🔨	1	0	1	0	1	0	1	X	4

Sheet B	1	2	3	4	5	6	7	8	9	Final
(Alberta) Kevin Koe	0	1	0	2	0	3	0	1	0	7
(Ontario) Brad Jacobs 🔨	1	0	5	0	1	0	0	0	1	8

==== Draw 8 ====
Thursday, May 5, 8:30 am

Sheet A	1	2	3	4	5	6	7	8	Final
(Manitoba) Jason Gunnlaugson 🔨	1	0	5	1	0	0	2	X	9
(United States) Korey Dropkin	0	3	0	0	2	1	0	X	6

Sheet B	1	2	3	4	5	6	7	8	Final
(Ontario) John Epping 🔨	1	0	0	1	1	0	3	X	6
(Alberta) Karsten Sturmay	0	0	2	0	0	1	0	X	3

==== Draw 9 ====
Thursday, May 5, 12:00 pm

Sheet A	1	2	3	4	5	6	7	8	9	Final
(Sweden) Niklas Edin	0	1	0	0	3	0	0	0	1	5
(South Korea) Kim Soo-hyuk 🔨	1	0	0	1	0	0	1	1	0	4

Sheet B	1	2	3	4	5	6	7	8	Final
(Newfoundland and Labrador) Brad Gushue 🔨	3	1	0	1	3	0	X	X	8
(Alberta) Ryan Jacques	0	0	1	0	0	1	X	X	2

==== Draw 10 ====
Thursday, May 5, 4:00 pm

Sheet B	1	2	3	4	5	6	7	8	Final
(Alberta) Brendan Bottcher 🔨	0	3	0	0	2	1	0	1	7
(Manitoba) Jason Gunnlaugson	1	0	1	1	0	0	3	0	6

Sheet C	1	2	3	4	5	6	7	8	Final
(Ontario) Brad Jacobs 🔨	2	0	0	1	1	0	2	X	6
(Ontario) John Epping	0	1	0	0	0	1	0	X	2

==== Draw 11 ====
Thursday, May 5, 8:00 pm

Sheet B	1	2	3	4	5	6	7	8	Final
(Sweden) Niklas Edin 🔨	3	0	3	0	0	2	X	X	8
(Scotland) Bruce Mouat	0	1	0	2	1	0	X	X	4

Sheet C	1	2	3	4	5	6	7	8	Final
(Newfoundland and Labrador) Brad Gushue	0	2	0	1	0	2	0	0	5
(Alberta) Kevin Koe 🔨	2	0	2	0	1	0	0	3	8

==== Draw 12 ====
Friday, May 6, 8:30 am

Sheet B	1	2	3	4	5	6	7	8	Final
(United States) Korey Dropkin 🔨	0	0	0	3	1	0	2	X	6
(South Korea) Kim Soo-hyuk	0	1	2	0	0	1	0	X	4

Sheet C	1	2	3	4	5	6	7	8	Final
(Alberta) Karsten Sturmay	0	2	0	0	0	0	X	X	2
(Alberta) Ryan Jacques 🔨	3	0	2	0	1	2	X	X	8

==== Draw 13 ====
Friday, May 6, 12:00 pm

Sheet C	1	2	3	4	5	6	7	8	Final
(Sweden) Niklas Edin	0	1	0	2	0	0	0	X	3
(Alberta) Brendan Bottcher 🔨	2	0	2	0	0	0	4	X	8

Sheet D	1	2	3	4	5	6	7	8	Final
(Newfoundland and Labrador) Brad Gushue 🔨	1	0	2	0	1	2	0	1	7
(Ontario) Brad Jacobs	0	1	0	1	0	0	2	0	4

==== Draw 14 ====
Friday, May 6, 4:00 pm

Sheet C	1	2	3	4	5	6	7	8	Final
(Scotland) Bruce Mouat	0	1	0	2	0	0	2	0	5
(United States) Korey Dropkin 🔨	2	0	2	0	1	2	0	0	7

Sheet D	1	2	3	4	5	6	7	8	Final
(Alberta) Kevin Koe 🔨	0	1	0	0	3	0	0	2	6
(Alberta) Karsten Sturmay	0	0	2	1	0	1	1	0	5

==== Draw 15 ====
Friday, May 6, 8:00 pm

Sheet C	1	2	3	4	5	6	7	8	Final
(Manitoba) Jason Gunnlaugson	1	1	0	2	0	0	2	X	6
(South Korea) Kim Soo-hyuk 🔨	0	0	2	0	1	0	0	X	3

Sheet D	1	2	3	4	5	6	7	8	Final
(Ontario) John Epping 🔨	2	0	0	1	1	0	1	0	5
(Alberta) Ryan Jacques	0	2	1	0	0	0	0	1	4

=== Playoffs ===
Quarterfinals
4	(Alberta) Brendan Bottcher	3
5	(Newfoundland and Labrador) Brad Gushue	6
3	(Ontario) Brad Jacobs	6
6	(Manitoba) Jason Gunnlaugson	2

Semifinals
1	(Sweden) Niklas Edin	5
5	(Newfoundland and Labrador) Brad Gushue	6
2	(Alberta) Kevin Koe	4
3	(Ontario) Brad Jacobs	3

Final
5	(Newfoundland and Labrador) Brad Gushue	8
2	(Alberta) Kevin Koe	5

==== Quarterfinals ====
Saturday, May 7, 4:00 pm

Sheet A	1	2	3	4	5	6	7	8	Final
(Alberta) Brendan Bottcher 🔨	1	1	0	1	0	0	0	X	3
(Newfoundland and Labrador) Brad Gushue	0	0	2	0	0	3	1	X	6

Player percentages
(Alberta) Team Bottcher		(Newfoundland and Labrador) Team Gushue	
Karrick Martin	92%	Geoff Walker	77%
Bradley Thiessen	81%	Brett Gallant	77%
Pat Janssen	67%	Mark Nichols	88%
Brendan Bottcher	67%	Brad Gushue	87%
Total	77%	Total	82%

Sheet C	1	2	3	4	5	6	7	8	Final
(Ontario) Brad Jacobs 🔨	2	1	0	0	1	0	2	X	6
(Manitoba) Jason Gunnlaugson	0	0	0	1	0	1	0	X	2

Player percentages
(Ontario) Team Jacobs		(Manitoba) Team Gunnlaugson	
Ryan Harnden	95%	Connor Njegovan	100%
E. J. Harnden	95%	Matt Wozniak	86%
Marc Kennedy	91%	Tyler Tardi	82%
Brad Jacobs	93%	Jason Gunnlaugson	82%
Total	93%	Total	88%

==== Semifinals ====
Saturday, May 7, 8:00 pm

Sheet B	1	2	3	4	5	6	7	8	9	Final
(Newfoundland and Labrador) Brad Gushue	0	2	0	1	0	0	2	0	1	6
(Sweden) Niklas Edin 🔨	1	0	1	0	0	2	0	1	0	5

Player percentages
(Newfoundland and Labrador) Team Gushue		(Sweden) Team Edin	
Geoff Walker	94%	Christoffer Sundgren	96%
Brett Gallant	86%	Rasmus Wranå	78%
Mark Nichols	92%	Oskar Eriksson	96%
Brad Gushue	97%	Niklas Edin	82%
Total	92%	Total	88%

Sheet D	1	2	3	4	5	6	7	8	Final
(Alberta) Kevin Koe	0	0	2	1	0	0	0	1	4
(Ontario) Brad Jacobs 🔨	0	2	0	0	0	1	0	0	3

Player percentages
(Alberta) Team Koe		(Ontario) Team Jacobs	
Ben Hebert	97%	Ryan Harnden	98%
B. J. Neufeld	91%	E. J. Harnden	89%
John Morris	92%	Marc Kennedy	92%
Kevin Koe	84%	Brad Jacobs	82%
Total	91%	Total	90%

==== Final ====
Sunday, May 8, 10:00 am

Sheet B	1	2	3	4	5	6	7	8	Final
(Newfoundland and Labrador) Brad Gushue	0	2	1	3	2	0	X	X	8
(Alberta) Kevin Koe 🔨	2	0	0	0	0	3	X	X	5

Player percentages
(Newfoundland and Labrador) Team Gushue		(Alberta) Team Koe	
Geoff Walker	93%	Ben Hebert	88%
Brett Gallant	91%	B. J. Neufeld	96%
Mark Nichols	91%	John Morris	71%
Brad Gushue	85%	Kevin Koe	61%
Total	90%	Total	79%

== Women ==
=== Teams ===
The teams are listed as follows:

Skip	Third	Second	Lead	Alternate	Locale
Cory Christensen	Vicky Persinger	Sarah Anderson	Taylor Anderson		(United States) Duluth, Minnesota
Madeleine Dupont	Mathilde Halse	Denise Dupont	My Larsen	Jasmin Lander	Hvidovre, Denmark
Kerri Einarson	Val Sweeting	Shannon Birchard	Briane Meilleur		Gimli, Manitoba
Tracy Fleury	Selena Njegovan	Liz Fyfe	Kristin MacCuish	Taylor McDonald	East St. Paul, Manitoba
Gim Eun-ji	Kim Min-ji	Kim Su-ji	Seol Ye-eun	Seol Ye-ji	Uijeongbu, South Korea
Anna Hasselborg	Sara McManus	Agnes Knochenhauer	Sofia Mabergs		Sundbyberg, Sweden
Amber Holland	Kim Schneider	Karlee Korchinski	Debbie Lozinski		Kronau, Saskatchewan
Rachel Homan	Emma Miskew	Sarah Wilkes	Joanne Courtney		Ottawa, Ontario
Jennifer Jones	Kaitlyn Lawes	Jocelyn Peterman	Dawn McEwen	Lisa Weagle	Winnipeg, Manitoba
Kim Eun-jung	Kim Kyeong-ae	Kim Cho-hi	Kim Seon-yeong	Kim Yeong-mi	Gangneung, South Korea
Tabitha Peterson	Nina Roth	Becca Hamilton	Tara Peterson	Aileen Geving	(United States) Saint Paul, Minnesota
Alina Pätz (Fourth)	Silvana Tirinzoni (Skip)	Esther Neuenschwander	Melanie Barbezat		Aarau, Switzerland

=== Round-robin standings ===
Final round-robin standings

Key
Teams to Playoffs
Teams to Tiebreakers

Pool A	W	L	PF	PA	DSC
(Sweden) Anna Hasselborg	5	0	43	25	40.0
(Switzerland) Silvana Tirinzoni	4	1	33	20	106.5
(United States) Tabitha Peterson	2	3	35	29	158.1
(Denmark) Madeleine Dupont	2	3	18	34	163.1
(Saskatchewan) Amber Holland	1	4	21	37	313.8
(Manitoba) Jennifer Jones	1	4	30	35	192.4

Pool B	W	L	PF	PA	DSC
(Ontario) Rachel Homan	3	2	28	27	48.4
(Manitoba) Tracy Fleury	3	2	23	25	103.4
(South Korea) Gim Eun-ji	3	2	32	26	109.1
(Manitoba) Kerri Einarson	3	2	30	23	146.0
(South Korea) Kim Eun-jung	3	2	33	27	147.3
(United States) Cory Christensen	0	5	25	43	78.6

=== Round-robin results ===
All draw times are listed in Mountain Daylight Time (UTC−06:00).

==== Draw 1 ====
Tuesday, May 3, 1:00 pm

Sheet A	1	2	3	4	5	6	7	8	Final
(South Korea) Kim Eun-jung	0	1	0	1	0	2	0	X	4
(South Korea) Gim Eun-ji 🔨	2	0	1	0	1	0	4	X	8

Sheet B	1	2	3	4	5	6	7	8	9	Final
(Manitoba) Jennifer Jones	0	1	0	0	2	0	1	0	0	4
(Denmark) Madeleine Dupont 🔨	1	0	0	1	0	1	0	1	1	5

==== Draw 2 ====
Tuesday, May 3, 4:30 pm

Sheet A	1	2	3	4	5	6	7	8	Final
(Manitoba) Kerri Einarson	0	0	4	0	1	3	1	X	9
(United States) Cory Christensen 🔨	2	1	0	1	0	0	0	X	4

Sheet B	1	2	3	4	5	6	7	8	Final
(Switzerland) Silvana Tirinzoni 🔨	3	0	1	2	0	2	X	X	8
(Saskatchewan) Amber Holland	0	1	0	0	1	0	X	X	2

==== Draw 3 ====
Tuesday, May 3, 8:00 pm

Sheet A	1	2	3	4	5	6	7	8	Final
(Manitoba) Tracy Fleury 🔨	0	2	0	1	0	1	0	0	4
(Ontario) Rachel Homan	1	0	2	0	1	0	1	1	6

Sheet B	1	2	3	4	5	6	7	8	9	Final
(Sweden) Anna Hasselborg	0	1	0	0	4	0	1	0	3	9
(United States) Tabitha Peterson 🔨	2	0	0	1	0	2	0	1	0	6

==== Draw 4 ====
Wednesday, May 4, 8:30 am

Sheet B	1	2	3	4	5	6	7	8	Final
(South Korea) Kim Eun-jung 🔨	3	0	2	0	4	1	1	X	11
(United States) Cory Christensen	0	4	0	2	0	0	0	X	6

Sheet C	1	2	3	4	5	6	7	8	Final
(Manitoba) Jennifer Jones 🔨	2	0	3	0	1	0	0	1	7
(Saskatchewan) Amber Holland	0	4	0	1	0	2	1	0	8

==== Draw 5 ====
Wednesday, May 4, 12:00 pm

Sheet B	1	2	3	4	5	6	7	8	Final
(Manitoba) Kerri Einarson 🔨	1	0	0	1	1	0	1	1	5
(Ontario) Rachel Homan	0	2	1	0	0	1	0	0	4

Sheet C	1	2	3	4	5	6	7	8	Final
(Switzerland) Silvana Tirinzoni 🔨	0	2	0	1	0	1	0	1	5
(United States) Tabitha Peterson	1	0	0	0	1	0	2	0	4

==== Draw 6 ====
Wednesday, May 4, 4:00 pm

Sheet B	1	2	3	4	5	6	7	8	Final
(Manitoba) Tracy Fleury	0	0	1	0	1	0	1	2	5
(South Korea) Gim Eun-ji 🔨	0	1	0	1	0	1	0	0	3

Sheet C	1	2	3	4	5	6	7	8	Final
(Sweden) Anna Hasselborg 🔨	4	0	2	0	0	1	0	1	8
(Denmark) Madeleine Dupont	0	2	0	0	1	0	2	0	5

==== Draw 7 ====
Wednesday, May 4, 8:00 pm

Sheet C	1	2	3	4	5	6	7	8	Final
(Manitoba) Kerri Einarson 🔨	0	2	0	1	0	0	4	X	7
(South Korea) Kim Eun-jung	0	0	2	0	0	1	0	X	3

Sheet D	1	2	3	4	5	6	7	8	Final
(Switzerland) Silvana Tirinzoni 🔨	2	0	1	0	2	0	2	1	8
(Manitoba) Jennifer Jones	0	2	0	2	0	1	0	0	5

==== Draw 8 ====
Thursday, May 5, 8:30 am

Sheet C	1	2	3	4	5	6	7	8	Final
(Ontario) Rachel Homan	1	0	3	1	0	1	0	1	7
(South Korea) Gim Eun-ji 🔨	0	2	0	0	2	0	1	0	5

Sheet D	1	2	3	4	5	6	7	8	Final
(United States) Tabitha Peterson 🔨	2	0	1	2	0	7	X	X	12
(Denmark) Madeleine Dupont	0	1	0	0	1	0	X	X	2

==== Draw 9 ====
Thursday, May 5, 12:00 pm

Sheet C	1	2	3	4	5	6	7	8	9	Final
(Manitoba) Tracy Fleury 🔨	0	0	2	1	0	1	1	0	2	7
(United States) Cory Christensen	0	1	0	0	2	0	0	2	0	5

Sheet D	1	2	3	4	5	6	7	8	Final
(Sweden) Anna Hasselborg 🔨	0	3	0	3	1	0	3	X	10
(Saskatchewan) Amber Holland	0	0	1	0	0	2	0	X	3

==== Draw 10 ====
Thursday, May 5, 4:00 pm

Sheet A	1	2	3	4	5	6	7	8	Final
(Manitoba) Jennifer Jones 🔨	4	0	3	0	0	1	0	1	9
(United States) Tabitha Peterson	0	1	0	2	1	0	2	0	6

Sheet D	1	2	3	4	5	6	7	8	Final
(South Korea) Kim Eun-jung	2	0	1	0	0	3	0	1	7
(Ontario) Rachel Homan 🔨	0	1	0	2	0	0	1	0	4

==== Draw 11 ====
Thursday, May 5, 8:00 pm

Sheet A	1	2	3	4	5	6	7	8	9	Final
(Sweden) Anna Hasselborg 🔨	0	3	0	0	0	2	1	0	2	8
(Switzerland) Silvana Tirinzoni	2	0	1	1	0	0	0	2	0	6

Sheet D	1	2	3	4	5	6	7	8	Final
(Manitoba) Tracy Fleury 🔨	1	1	1	0	0	0	1	1	5
(Manitoba) Kerri Einarson	0	0	0	1	0	2	0	0	3

==== Draw 12 ====
Friday, May 6, 8:30 am

Sheet A	1	2	3	4	5	6	7	8	Final
(Denmark) Madeleine Dupont	0	1	2	0	1	0	1	0	5
(Saskatchewan) Amber Holland 🔨	0	0	0	2	0	1	0	1	4

Sheet D	1	2	3	4	5	6	7	8	Final
(South Korea) Gim Eun-ji	1	0	2	0	2	0	0	4	9
(United States) Cory Christensen 🔨	0	1	0	1	0	2	0	0	4

==== Draw 13 ====
Friday, May 6, 12:00 pm

Sheet A	1	2	3	4	5	6	7	8	Final
(Manitoba) Tracy Fleury	0	2	0	0	0	X	X	X	2
(South Korea) Kim Eun-jung 🔨	2	0	0	2	4	X	X	X	8

Sheet B	1	2	3	4	5	6	7	8	Final
(Sweden) Anna Hasselborg 🔨	1	0	0	0	2	0	2	3	8
(Manitoba) Jennifer Jones	0	1	1	1	0	2	0	0	5

==== Draw 14 ====
Friday, May 6, 4:00 pm

Sheet A	1	2	3	4	5	6	7	8	9	Final
(Manitoba) Kerri Einarson	0	1	0	2	0	1	0	2	0	6
(South Korea) Gim Eun-ji 🔨	1	0	2	0	1	0	2	0	1	7

Sheet B	1	2	3	4	5	6	7	8	Final
(Switzerland) Silvana Tirinzoni 🔨	1	0	2	1	1	1	X	X	6
(Denmark) Madeleine Dupont	0	1	0	0	0	0	X	X	1

==== Draw 15 ====
Friday, May 6, 8:00 pm

Sheet A	1	2	3	4	5	6	7	8	Final
(Ontario) Rachel Homan	0	2	0	2	0	1	0	2	7
(United States) Cory Christensen 🔨	2	0	2	0	1	0	1	0	6

Sheet B	1	2	3	4	5	6	7	8	Final
(United States) Tabitha Peterson	0	3	0	2	0	1	1	X	7
(Saskatchewan) Amber Holland 🔨	1	0	2	0	1	0	0	X	4

=== Tiebreaker ===
Saturday, May 7, 12:00 pm

Sheet B	1	2	3	4	5	6	7	8	Final
(Manitoba) Kerri Einarson	0	1	0	3	1	0	2	X	7
(South Korea) Kim Eun-jung 🔨	2	0	1	0	0	1	0	X	4

Player percentages
(Manitoba) Team Einarson		(South Korea) Team Kim	
Briane Meilleur	92%	Kim Seon-yeong	78%
Shannon Birchard	80%	Kim Cho-hi	72%
Val Sweeting	83%	Kim Kyeong-ae	80%
Kerri Einarson	69%	Kim Eun-jung	62%
Total	81%	Total	73%

=== Playoffs ===
Quarterfinals
3	(Ontario) Rachel Homan	3
6	(Manitoba) Kerri Einarson	5
4	(Manitoba) Tracy Fleury	3
5	(South Korea) Gim Eun-ji	8

Semifinals
1	(Sweden) Anna Hasselborg	4
6	(Manitoba) Kerri Einarson	6
2	(Switzerland) Silvana Tirinzoni	4
5	(South Korea) Gim Eun-ji	5

Final
6	(Manitoba) Kerri Einarson	10
5	(South Korea) Gim Eun-ji	6

==== Quarterfinals ====
Saturday, May 7, 4:00 pm

Sheet B	1	2	3	4	5	6	7	8	Final
(Ontario) Rachel Homan 🔨	0	1	0	0	1	0	1	0	3
(Manitoba) Kerri Einarson	0	0	1	2	0	1	0	1	5

Player percentages
(Ontario) Team Homan		(Manitoba) Team Einarson	
Joanne Courtney	91%	Briane Meilleur	92%
Sarah Wilkes	100%	Shannon Birchard	92%
Emma Miskew	86%	Val Sweeting	97%
Rachel Homan	88%	Kerri Einarson	97%
Total	91%	Total	94%

Sheet D	1	2	3	4	5	6	7	8	Final
(Manitoba) Tracy Fleury	0	0	2	0	0	1	X	X	3
(South Korea) Gim Eun-ji 🔨	4	1	0	3	0	0	X	X	8

Player percentages
(Manitoba) Team Fleury		(South Korea) Team Gim	
Kristin MacCuish	98%	Seol Ye-eun	100%
Liz Fyfe	90%	Kim Su-ji	96%
Selena Njegovan	96%	Kim Min-ji	96%
Tracy Fleury	95%	Gim Eun-ji	95%
Total	95%	Total	97%

==== Semifinals ====
Saturday, May 7, 8:00 pm

Sheet A	1	2	3	4	5	6	7	8	Final
(Sweden) Anna Hasselborg 🔨	2	0	0	1	0	1	0	X	4
(Manitoba) Kerri Einarson	0	0	1	0	3	0	2	X	6

Player percentages
(Sweden) Team Hasselborg		(Manitoba) Team Einarson	
Sofia Mabergs	91%	Briane Meilleur	98%
Agnes Knochenhauer	95%	Shannon Birchard	80%
Sara McManus	88%	Val Sweeting	94%
Anna Hasselborg	72%	Kerri Einarson	90%
Total	87%	Total	90%

Sheet C	1	2	3	4	5	6	7	8	Final
(Switzerland) Silvana Tirinzoni 🔨	1	1	0	0	0	0	2	0	4
(South Korea) Gim Eun-ji	0	0	1	1	1	1	0	1	5

Player percentages
(Switzerland) Team Tirinzoni		(South Korea) Team Gim	
Melanie Barbezat	84%	Seol Ye-eun	91%
Esther Neuenschwander	86%	Kim Su-ji	78%
Silvana Tirinzoni	89%	Kim Min-ji	92%
Alina Pätz	80%	Gim Eun-ji	78%
Total	85%	Total	85%

==== Final ====
Sunday, May 8, 2:00 pm

Sheet B	1	2	3	4	5	6	7	8	Final
(Manitoba) Kerri Einarson 🔨	2	1	0	4	0	0	0	3	10
(South Korea) Gim Eun-ji	0	0	2	0	1	2	1	0	6

Player percentages
(Manitoba) Team Einarson		(South Korea) Team Gim	
Briane Meilleur	98%	Seol Ye-eun	88%
Shannon Birchard	86%	Kim Su-ji	77%
Val Sweeting	92%	Kim Min-ji	81%
Kerri Einarson	77%	Gim Eun-ji	59%
Total	88%	Total	76%
