= Avonair Cash Spiel =

Canadian curling tournament

Location in Canada

The Avonair Cash Spiel is an annual bonspiel, or curling tournament, that takes place at the Avonair Curling Club in Edmonton, Alberta. The tournament is held in a round robin format. The tournament started in 2013 as part of the World Curling Tour's regional developmental series of events.

== Past champions ==
=== Men ===
Year	Winning team	Runner up team	Purse (CAD)
2013	(Alberta) Ted Appelman, Shawn Donnelly, Landon Bucholz, Bryce Bucholz	(Alberta) Shane Park, Tony Germsheid, Aaron Sarafinchan, Phil Hemming	$11,000
2014	(South Korea) Kim Soo-hyuk, Park Jong-duk, Kim Tae-hwan, Yoo Min-hyeon	(Alberta) Daylan Vavrek, Evan Asmussen, Jason Ginter, Andrew O'Dell	$11,000
2015	(South Korea) Kim Soo-hyuk, Kim Tae-hwan, Park Jong-duk, Nam Yoon-ho	(Alberta) Robert Collins, Thomas Usselman, Scott Sawatzky, Colin Stroeder	$10,800
2016	(Alberta) Glen Hansen, Dean Ross, Don Bartlett, George Parsons	(Alberta) Charley Thomas, Nathan Connolly, Brandon Klassen, D. J. Kidby	$10,800
2017	(Alberta) Aaron Sluchinski, Dean Mamer, Kerr Drummond, Dylan Webster	(China) Zou Dejia, Zou Qiang, Xu Jingtao, Shao Zhilin	$12,500
2018	(Alberta) Karsten Sturmay, Tristan Steinke, Jason Ginter, Glenn Venance	(Alberta) Thomas Usselman, Aaron Sarafinchan, Morgan Van Doesburg, Brad Kokoroyannis	$12,000
2019	(Alberta) Jeremy Harty, Kyler Kleibrink, Joel Berger, Kurtis Goller	(Alberta) Ryan Jacques, Desmond Young, Andrew Gittis, Gabriel Dyck	$12,000

=== Women ===
Year	Winning team	Runner up team	Purse (CAD)
2013	(Alberta) Jessie Kaufman, Tiffany Steuber, Dayna Demmans, Stephanie Enright	(Alberta) Holly Whyte, Heather Steele, Deena Benoit, Karynn Flory	$11,000
2014	(Japan) Mari Motohashi, Chinami Yoshida, Yumi Suzuki, Yurika Yoshida	(Alberta) Tiffany Game, Vanessa Pouliot, Jennifer Van Wieren, Melissa Pierce	$11,000
2015	(China) Mei Jie, Gao Xuesong, Jiang Xindi, She Qiutong	(Japan) Rina Ida, Tamami Mato, Mao Ishigaki, Natsuko Ishiyama	$9,300
2016	(Alberta) Nadine Chyz, Heather Jensen, Rebecca Konschuh, Heather Rogers	(Alberta) Jodi Marthaller, Tessa Ruetz, Nicole Larson, Valerie Ekelund	$9,700
2017	(Alberta) Nadine Scotland, Heather Jensen, Rebecca Konschuh, Heather Rogers	(Alberta) Jodi Marthaller, Jody McNabb, Nicole Larson, Valerie Ekelund	$7,700
2018	(Alberta) Nicky Kaufman, Pam Appelman, Holly Baird, Stephanie Enright	(Alberta) Tiffany Steuber, Brittany Martin, Lisa Miller, Cindy Westgard	$9,000
2019	(Alberta) Marla Sherrer, Janais DeJong, Julie Servais, Rebecca Boorse	(Alberta) Kaitlin Stubbs, Cassie Savage, Lesley Pyne, Megan Johnson	$10,000
