= The Flatiron Challenge at Lacombe =

Former World Curling Tour event

2012 The Flatiron Challenge at Lacombe
- Host city: Lacombe, Alberta
- Arena: Lacombe Curling Club
- Dates: October 19–21
- Winner: (Alberta) Robert Schlender
- Curling club: Edmonton, Alberta
- Skip: Robert Schlender
- Third: Dean Ross
- Second: Don Bartlett
- Lead: Chris Lemishka
- Finalist: (Alberta) Parker Konschuh

The Flatiron Challenge at Lacombe was a bonspiel, or curling tournament, that took place at the Lacombe Curling Club in Lacombe, Alberta. The tournament was one of the development series events introduced on the World Curling Tour during the 2012–13 curling season. The tournament was held in a round robin format.

It was held from October 19 to 21; the purse for the event was CAD$8,000, of which the winner, Robert Schlender, received CAD$2,000. Due to the lack of teams participating, the men's and women's events were combined, and both men's and women's teams played in one round robin competition.

== Champions ==
Only skip's name is displayed.

Year	Winning team	Runner up team	Purse (CAD)
2012	(Alberta) Robert Schlender	(Alberta) Parker Konschuh	$8,000

== Teams ==
The teams are listed as follows:

Skip	Third	Second	Lead	Locale
Warren Cross	Dean Darwent	Jim Wallbank	Chad Jones	Edmonton, Alberta
Teryn Hamilton	Holly Scott	Logan Conway	Karen Vanthuyne	Calgary, Alberta
Parker Konschuh	Jacob Ortt	Michael Hauer	Mac Walton	Edmonton, Alberta
Derek Miller	Adam Enright	Dustin Eckstrand	Matt Enright	Camrose, Alberta
Morgan Muise	Lyndsay Allen	Sarah Horne	Sara Gartner-Frey	Calgary, Alberta
Kevin Park	Shane Park	Josh Burns	Eric Richard	Edmonton, Alberta
Lowell Peterman	Fred Armstrong	Lyle Treiber	Steve Matejka	Red Deer, Alberta
Jon Rennie	Jeff Inglis	Rob Collins	Eric Wasylenko	Calgary, Alberta
Robert Schlender	Dean Ross	Don Bartlett	Chris Lemishka	Edmonton, Alberta
Wade Scoffin	Joe Wallingham	Will Mahoney	Mitchell Young	Whitehorse, Yukon
Justin Sluchinski	Aaron Sluchinski	Dylan Webster	Craig Bourgonje	Airdrie, Alberta
Daylan Vavrek	Carter Lautner	Daniel Wenzek	Cody Smith	Edmonton, Alberta
Holly Whyte	Heather Steele	Cori Dunbar	Jamie Forth	Edmonton, Alberta
Jessi Wilkinson	Tyler Pfeiffer	Morgan Vandoesburg	Julian Sawiak	Edmonton, Alberta
Kevin Yablonski	Vance Elder	Harrison Boss	Matthew McDonald	Calgary, Alberta

== Round-robin standings ==
Final round-robin standings

Key
Teams to Playoffs
Teams to Tiebreaker

Pool A	W	L
(Alberta) Parker Konschuh	3	1
(Alberta) Robert Schlender	3	1
(Alberta) Jon Rennie	2	2
(Alberta) Lowell Peterman	1	3
(Alberta) Holly Whyte	1	3

Pool B	W	L
(Alberta) Kevin Park	4	0
(Alberta) Morgan Muise	2	2
(Alberta) Jessi Wilkinson	2	2
(Alberta) Daylan Vavrek	1	3
(Alberta) Warren Cross	1	3

Pool C	W	L
(Alberta) Kevin Yablonski	4	0
(Yukon) Wade Scoffin	2	2
(Alberta) Justin Sluchinski	2	2
(Alberta) Teryn Hamilton	1	3
(Alberta) Derek Miller	1	3

== Tiebreaker ==
Team	Final
(Alberta) Justin Sluchinski	3
(Yukon) Wade Scoffin	4

== Playoffs ==
Quarterfinals
(Alberta) Kevin Park	3
(Yukon) Wade Scoffin	7
(Alberta) Parker Konschuh	6
(Alberta) Jessi Wilkinson	5
(Alberta) Kevin Yablonski	2
(Alberta) Jon Rennie	7
(Alberta) Robert Schlender	6
(Alberta) Morgan Muise	3

Semifinals
(Yukon) Wade Scoffin	2
(Alberta) Parker Konschuh	6
(Alberta) Jon Rennie	5
(Alberta) Robert Schlender	7

Final
(Alberta) Parker Konschuh	6
(Alberta) Robert Schlender	7
