= Champions Cup (curling) =

Canadian curling tournament

- Established: 2016
- 2023 host city: Regina, Saskatchewan
- 2023 arena: The Co-operators Centre

Current champions (2023)
- Men: (Alberta) Brendan Bottcher
- Women: (Ontario) Rachel Homan

Current edition
- 2023 Champions Cup (curling)

The Champions Cup (branded as the KIOTI Tractor Champions Cup for sponsorship reasons) is a Canadian curling tournament. Part of the Grand Slam of Curling (GSoC) and the World Curling Tour, it is the sixth GSoC event on the women's tour and the seventh on the men's tour.

The tournament's field usually includes 15 teams each in the men's and women's competitions. 13 of the spots are filled by champion teams from GSoC events, and world, national, and regional champions, The champions of two World Curling Tour events, based on the strength of field, are also invited. If a team qualifies from more than one event or declines the invitation, champions of World Curling Tour events with the highest strength of field are invited until the field of 15 teams is completed.

Due to the COVID-19 pandemic, the 2021 Champions Cup format was altered to consist of top 12 teams according to the World Curling Federation’s world curling team rankings, divided into two pools.

The event will be put on pause following the 2022–23 season.

== Past champions ==
=== Men ===
Year	Winning team	Runner-up team	Location	Purse
2016	(Manitoba) Reid Carruthers, Braeden Moskowy, Derek Samagalski, Colin Hodgson	(Ontario) John Epping, Mat Camm, Pat Janssen, Tim March	Sherwood Park, Alberta	$100,000
2017	(Ontario) Brad Jacobs, Ryan Fry, E. J. Harnden, Ryan Harnden	(Alberta) Kevin Koe, Marc Kennedy, Brent Laing, Ben Hebert	Calgary, Alberta	$100,000
2018	(Newfoundland and Labrador) Brad Gushue, Mark Nichols, Brett Gallant, Geoff Walker	(Ontario) Glenn Howard, Adam Spencer, David Mathers, Scott Howard	Calgary, Alberta	$100,000
2019	(Alberta) Brendan Bottcher, Darren Moulding, Brad Thiessen, Karrick Martin	(Alberta) Kevin Koe, B. J. Neufeld, Colton Flasch, Ben Hebert	Saskatoon, Saskatchewan	$125,000
2020	Cancelled			
2021	(Scotland) Bruce Mouat, Grant Hardie, Bobby Lammie, Hammy McMillan Jr.	(Alberta) Brendan Bottcher, Darren Moulding, Brad Thiessen, Karrick Martin	Calgary, Alberta	$150,000
2022	(Newfoundland and Labrador) Brad Gushue, Mark Nichols, Brett Gallant, Geoff Walker	(Alberta) Kevin Koe, John Morris, B. J. Neufeld, Ben Hebert	Olds, Alberta	$105,000
2023	(Alberta) Brendan Bottcher, Marc Kennedy, Brett Gallant, Ben Hebert	(Newfoundland and Labrador) Brad Gushue, Mark Nichols, E. J. Harnden, Geoff Walker	Regina, Saskatchewan	$105,000

=== Women ===
Year	Winning team	Runner-up team	Location	Purse
2016	(Manitoba) Jennifer Jones, Kaitlyn Lawes, Jill Officer, Dawn McEwen	(Ontario) Rachel Homan, Emma Miskew, Joanne Courtney, Lisa Weagle	Sherwood Park, Alberta	$100,000
2017	(Ontario) Rachel Homan, Emma Miskew, Sarah Wilkes, Lisa Weagle	(Sweden) Anna Hasselborg, Sara McManus, Agnes Knochenhauer, Sofia Mabergs	Calgary, Alberta	$100,000
2018	(Ontario) Rachel Homan, Emma Miskew, Joanne Courtney, Lisa Weagle	(Manitoba) Kerri Einarson, Selena Kaatz, Liz Fyfe, Kristin MacCuish	Calgary, Alberta	$100,000
2019	(Switzerland) Alina Pätz, Silvana Tirinzoni (skip), Esther Neuenschwander, Melanie Barbezat	(Manitoba) Kerri Einarson, Val Sweeting, Shannon Birchard, Briane Meilleur	Saskatoon, Saskatchewan	$125,000
2020	Cancelled			
2021	(Ontario) Rachel Homan, Emma Miskew, Sarah Wilkes, Joanne Courtney	(Switzerland) Alina Pätz, Silvana Tirinzoni (skip), Esther Neuenschwander, Melanie Barbezat	Calgary, Alberta	$150,000
2022	(Manitoba) Kerri Einarson, Val Sweeting, Shannon Birchard, Briane Meilleur	(South Korea) Gim Eun-ji, Kim Min-ji, Kim Su-ji, Seol Ye-eun, Seol Ye-ji	Olds, Alberta	$105,000
2023	(Ontario) Rachel Homan, Tracy Fleury, Emma Miskew, Rachelle Brown	(Manitoba) Kerri Einarson, Val Sweeting, Shannon Birchard, Dawn McEwen	Regina, Saskatchewan	$105,000
