= Ryan Jacques =

Canadian curler

- Curler
- Born: June 19, 2000 (age 26)

Team
- Curling club: Saville Community Sports Centre, Edmonton, AB
- Skip: Ryan Jacques
- Third: Cole Adams
- Second: Derek Bowyer
- Lead: Tyson Toews

Curling career
- Member Association: Alberta
- Top CTRS ranking: 25th (2021–22)

Ryan Jacques (born June 19, 2000) is a Canadian curler from Edmonton, Alberta. He is currently the skip of the Alberta Golden Bears men's curling team in university curling and on the World Curling Tour. Jacques was slated to represent Canada at the 2021 World Junior Curling Championships in Beijing, China, but the event was cancelled due to the COVID-19 pandemic.

== Curling career ==
Jacques won two provincial U18 championships, in 2016 and 2018. At the 2016 U18 International Curling Championships, Jacques led his Alberta rink of Zachary Pawliuk, Gabriel Dyck, and Michael Henricks to a 3-2 record in pool play, just missing the top playoff tier. At the 2018 Canadian U18 Curling Championships, Jacques led his team of Dustin Mikush, Dyck, and Henricks to a 3-2 record in pool play, winning the A qualifier and a spot in the playoff semifinal. Team Alberta earned a spot in the final by defeating the defending U18 national champion, Northern Ontario's Jacob Horgan, where the team lost to Graeme Weagle from Nova Scotia 10-6 in the gold medal game. Jacques also won the gold medal with teammate Olivia Jones for mixed doubles curling at the 2016 Alberta Winter Games in Medicine Hat, Alberta.

As a junior curler, Jacques won a provincial junior championship, in 2020. Representing Alberta with his rink of Desmond Young, Andrew Gittis, and Dyck, Jacques posted a 6-4 record at the 2020 Canadian Junior Curling Championships January 18–26, finishing 4th overall and missing the playoffs. As voted by the players, Jacques also received the Ken Watson Male Sportsmanship Award at the 2020 Canadian Juniors.

By virtue of placing 4th at the 2020 Canadian Juniors, Jacques and teammates Young and Dyck were selected for the 2021 World Juniors Canadian team, alongside Newfoundland players Joel Krats and Ryan McNeil Lamswood. The 2021 World Junior Curling Championships were to be hosted at the Ice Cube in Beijing, China, as a test event for the 2022 Winter Olympics, but was deemed impractical to run given necessary ongoing restrictions during the COVID-19 pandemic.

Jacques has been playing on the World Curling Tour since 2017. He lost the final of the 2019 Avonair Cash Spiel to Jeremy Harty. Jacques won his first tour event by winning the 2020 McKee Homes Fall Curling Classic. He also won the Vesta Energy Classic in 2021. He has played in one Grand Slam event in his career, the 2022 Champions Cup, where he failed to make the playoffs.

Jacques played in his first provincial men's championship in 2022, where he missed the playoffs, losing in final of the third qualifier.

== Grand Slam record ==
Key
C	Champion
F	Lost in Final
SF	Lost in Semifinal
QF	Lost in Quarterfinals
R16	Lost in the round of 16
Q	Did not advance to playoffs
T2	Played in Tier 2 event
DNP	Did not participate in event
N/A	Not a Grand Slam event that season

Event	2021–22	2022–23
Tour Challenge	DNP	T2
Champions Cup	Q	DNP
