= Desmond Young =

Canadian curler

- Curler
- Born: March 6, 2000 (age 26)

Team
- Curling club: Saville Community Sports Centre, Edmonton, AB
- Skip: Ryan Jacques
- Third: Desmond Young
- Second: Andrew Gittis
- Lead: Gabriel Dyck

Curling career
- Member Association: Alberta
- Top CTRS ranking: 25th (2021–22)

Desmond Young (born March 6, 2000, in Frederiction, New Brunswick) is a Canadian curler from Banff, Alberta. He is currently the third of the Alberta Golden Bears men's curling team in university curling and on the World Curling Tour. Young will represent Canada at the 2021 World Junior Curling Championships in Beijing, China.

== Curling career ==
Young made his Canadian national championship debut at the 2019 New Holland Canadian Juniors after defeating Evan Van Amsterdam 8–7 in the Alberta junior provincial final. At the Canadian Juniors, Young led his rink of Dustin Mikush, Jacob Libbus, and Gabriel Dyck to a 3–3 record in pool play before defeating Ontario's Samuel Steep in a tiebreaker. Young finished championship pool play with a record of 5-5, finishing 5th.

The following year Young joined the University of Alberta Golden Bears curling team. Skipped by Ryan Jacques, alongside teammates Andrew Gittis and Dyck, Young went undefeated at the 2020 Alberta junior championships, defeating former teammate Libbus 6–5 in the final. At the 2020 New Holland Canadian Juniors, the Alberta rink skipped by Jacques finished with a 6–4 record, narrowly missing the playoffs in 4th.

As a result of his 4th-place finish at the 2020 New Holland Canadian Juniors, Young, alongside teammates Jacques and Dyck, as well as Ryan McNeill Lamswood and Joel Krats from Newfoundland, has been selected to Team Canada at the 2021 World Junior Curling Championships in Beijing, China.

Young has played on the World Curling Tour since 2018. He lost the final of the 2018 Black Diamond / High River Cash to Thomas Usselman and lost the final of the 2019 Avonair Cash Spiel to Jeremy Harty.
