= Parker Konschuh =

Canadian curler

- Curler
- Born: April 10, 1991 (age 35)

Team
- Curling club: Crestwood CC, Edmonton, AB
- Skip: Evan van Amsterdam
- Third: Jeremy Harty
- Second: Jason Ginter
- Lead: Parker Konschuh

Curling career
- Member Association: Alberta
Medal record
Men's curling
Representing Canada
World Junior Curling Championships
Gold medal – first place	2012 Östersund
Winter Universiade
Bronze medal – third place	2013 Trentino

Parker Konschuh (born April 10, 1991) is a Canadian curler from Edmonton, Alberta. Konschuh skipped a team composed of third Craig Bourgonje, second Jacob Ortt, and lead Mackenzie Walton out of the Saville Community Centre in Edmonton, AB. He previously threw second rocks for the Edmonton-based Mick Lizmore rink, appearing in the Men's Provincial semifinal in 2015. He was a member of the gold medal winning Canadian Junior Team at the 2012 World Junior Curling Championships.

Konschuh's only provincial junior title came in 2011, playing second for Colin Hodgson. At the 2011 Canadian Junior Curling Championships, they represented Alberta and finished the round robin with a 6–6 record.

A year later, Konschuh was invited as the alternate or "spare" player for the Canadian Junior team at the 2012 Worlds. The team was skipped by fellow Albertan Brendan Bottcher. The team finished the round robin in first place, with an 8–1 record. They then won both their playoff matches to claim the gold medal.

After the 2011–12 season, Konschuh was picked up by the Glen Kennedy team to play lead for the 2012–13 season. However, Konschuh's top event of the season came when he got together with some of his former junior teammates and lost the final of the 2012 The Flatiron Challenge at Lacombe.

In 2013, Konschuh joined the Tom Appelman rink at lead position. As a member of the Appelman rink, Konschuh won the 2013 Shamrock Shotgun event on the World Curling Tour. In 2014, he joined the Mick Lizmore rink at second.
