= Andrew Gittis =

Canadian curler

- Curler
- Born: November 2, 1998 (age 28); West Chester, Pennsylvania, U.S.

Team
- Curling club: Saville Community Sports Centre, Edmonton, AB
- Skip: Ryan Jacques
- Third: Desmond Young
- Second: Andrew Gittis
- Lead: Gabriel Dyck

Curling career
- Member Association: Alberta
- Top CTRS ranking: 25th (2021–22)

Andrew Gittis (born November 2, 1998) is a Canadian curler from Edmonton, Alberta. He is currently the second of the Alberta Golden Bears men's curling team in university curling and on the World Curling Tour. Gittis is a dual citizen of the United States and Canada, and is now living in Canada full-time.

== Curling career ==
Gittis began his curling career in Pennsylvania where he learned to curl. He represented Massachusetts at the 2016 U18 International Curling Championships, finishing in 7th place. The next year, Gittis reached the 2017 USA Junior Curling nationals and the 2017 USA U18 Curling Nationals where his team won the bronze medal, and he won the sportsmanship award as voted on by fellow curlers. Around the same time, he got the opportunity to meet Brendan Bottcher who discovered that Gittis was also a Canadian Citizen and asked him to consider attending to the University of Alberta and trying out for their curling team. This is what led Gittis to his current position in Alberta on the Golden Bears Curling team.

Since moving to Alberta, Gittis has won two bronze medals at the 2019 and 2020 USPORTS National Championship alongside Karsten Sturmay, Christopher Kennedy, Glenn Venance, Caleb Boorse, and current teammate Desmond Young. As a junior curler, Gittis won a provincial junior championship in 2020 playing with Ryan Jacques, Young, and Gabriel Dyck. Representing Alberta at the 2020 Canadian Junior Curling Championships, Gittis and team Alberta finished in 4th place overall with a 6–4 record, which allowed his three younger teammates to be selected as a part of Team Canada at the 2021 World Junior Curling Championships.

Gittis is now aged out of junior curling and will continue to play on the world curling tour with Jacques, Young, and Dyck, where they had previously been the runner-ups of the 2019 Avonair Cash Spiel.
