= Gabriel Dyck =

Canadian curler (born 1999)

- Curler
- Born: July 21, 1999 (age 27); Quebec City, Quebec

Team
- Curling club: Saville Community Sports Centre, Edmonton, AB
- Skip: Ryan Jacques
- Third: Desmond Young
- Second: Andrew Gittis
- Lead: Gabriel Dyck

Curling career
- Member Association: Alberta
- Top CTRS ranking: 25th (2021–22)

Gabriel Dyck (born July 21, 1999) is a Canadian curler from Edmonton, Alberta. He is currently the lead of the Alberta Golden Bears men's curling team in university curling and on the World Curling Tour.

== Curling career ==
Dyck won two provincial U18 championships, in 2016 and 2018. Dyck played second along with Ryan Jacques, Zachary Pawliuk, and Michael Henricks at the 2016 U18 International Curling Championships in Edmonton, AB. Dyck, at second, again represented Alberta at the 2018 Canadian U18 Championships in St. Andrews, New Brunswick along with Ryan Jacques, Dustin Mikush and Michael Henricks. Team Alberta earned a spot in the final by defeating defending U18 national champion, Northern Ontario, skipped by Jacob Horgan. Alberta earned the silver medal, losing to Nova Scotia, skipped by Graeme Weagle. Dyck was awarded the Fair Play Award, voted on by the event officials, at the Championship.

Dyck won two Alberta Junior Curling titles in 2019 and 2020, playing lead. Dyck, Jacob Libbus, Dustin Mikush and Desmond Young represented Alberta at the Canadian Junior Curling Championships in Prince Albert, Saskatchewan in 2019, finishing 5th overall. Dyck again represented Alberta at the Canadian Junior Curling Championships in Langley, British Columbia in 2020 with teammates Andrew Gittis, Desmond Young and Ryan Jacques, finishing 4th overall.

With their 4th-place finish at the 2020 Canadian Juniors, Dyck and teammates Jacques and Young were selected alongside Newfoundland players Ryan McNeil Lamswood and Joel Krats to represent Canada at the 2021 World Junior Curling Championships in Beijing, China. The COVID-19 pandemic would see the event cancelled.

Dyck has played lead for the University of Alberta Golden Bears since 2019. In his two appearances at the CanWest Curling Championships, in 2022 & 2023, Dyck and teammates went undefeated earning gold both times. Dyck won the All Star Lead award at both his appearances.

As a result of his 2022 All Star Lead award, Dyck was named University of Alberta Athlete of the Week in February 2022.

Dyck is a 2020-2021 For the Love of Curling Scholarship recipient

Dyck is a two-time, 2020-2021 & 2021-2022?, U-SPORTS Academic All-Canadian (AAC) recognizing varsity athletes who maintain a 3.2 GPA average while competing.

Dyck has been playing on the World Curling Tour since 2017. Dyck and teammates Andrew Gittis, Desmond Young and Ryan Jacques won their first WCT event at the 2020 McKee Homes Fall Curling Classic. They also won the 2021 Vesta Energy Curling Classic in Red Deer, Alberta defeating Colton Flasch in the final.

Dyck played in his first Grand Slam event with teammates Andrew Gittis, Desmond Young and Ryan Jacques at the 2022 Kioti Tractor Champions Cup Grand Slam Players Championship in Olds, Alberta, earning one win against team Karsten Sturmay.

Dyck and teammates Gittis, Young and Jacques narrowly missed playoffs at the 2023 Boston Pizza Cup Alberta Men's Provincial Curling Championships at the Enoch Cree Nation, Alberta.

Dyck was awarded the Bo Davidiuk award for sweeping prowess, team support and sportsmanship, voted on by the players, at the 2023 Boston Pizza Cup.

Dyck coached the University of Alberta mixed doubles curling team of Emma Wiens/Andrew Nowell through the 2022–2023 season.

Dyck is a University of Alberta graduate student and coaches in the University of Alberta's junior curling development program.
