= Paf Masters =

World Curling Tour event

- Sponsor: Paf
- Established: 2017
- Host city: Eckerö, Åland, Finland
- Arena: Vianor Curlingcenter
- Purse: €18,000 (2019)
- 2019 champion: (Sweden) Isabella Wranå

The Paf Masters is an annual bonspiel, or curling tournament, sponsored by Paf, held at the Vianor Curlingcenter in Eckerö of Åland (Finland). It has been a part of the Women's World Curling Tour since 2017. The tournament is held in a round robin format.

== Past champions ==
Year	Winner	Runner up	Purse (Euro)
2017	(South Korea) Kim Eun-jung, Kim Kyeong-ae, Kim Seon-yeong, Kim Yeong-mi	(Canada) Shannon Kleibrink, Sarah Wilkes, Kalynn Park, Alison Thiessen	€ 18,600
2018	(Sweden) Isabella Wranå, Jennie Wåhlin, Almida de Val, Fanny Sjöberg	(Japan) Sayaka Yoshimura, Kaho Onodera, Anna Ohmiya, Yumie Funayama	€ 18,000
2019	(Sweden) Isabella Wranå, Jennie Wåhlin, Almida de Val, Fanny Sjöberg	(Switzerland) Irene Schori, Lara Stocker, Roxane Héritier, Isabelle Maillard	€ 18,000
2020	Cancelled		
