= 2018 Paf Masters Tour =

World Curling Tour event

- Host city: Eckerö, Åland
- Arena: Vianor Curling Center
- Dates: October 18–21
- Winner: (Sweden) Team Wranå
- Curling club: Sundbybergs CK, Sundbyberg
- Skip: Isabella Wranå
- Third: Jennie Wåhlin
- Second: Almida de Val
- Lead: Fanny Sjöberg
- Finalist: (Japan) Sayaka Yoshimura

The 2018 Paf Masters Tour was held October 18 to 21, 2018 at the Vianor Curling Center in Eckerö, Åland, Finland as a part of the 2018–19 curling season. The event was held in a round robin format with six teams advancing to the playoffs. The purse for the event was € 18,000.

In the final, Team Isabella Wranå of Sweden capped off a perfect 6–0 tournament by defeating the previously undefeated Sayaka Yoshimura rink from Japan 5–3 in the final. In the third place game, Tova Sundberg, also of Sweden, doubled up on Aline Fellmann of Switzerland 6–3. To reach the final, Wranå defeated Fellmann 6–4 in one semifinal and Yoshimura beat Sundberg 7–3 in the other.

== Teams ==
The teams are listed as follows:

Skip	Third	Second	Lead	Locale
Aline Fellmann	Larissa Berchtold	Chantale Widmer	Lara Moser	Schaffhausen, Switzerland
Pauline Jeanneret	Mari Hansen	Janina Lindström	Laura Kitti	Åland, Finland
Oona Kauste	Eszter Juhász	Maija Salmiovirta	Lotta Immonen	Åland, Finland
Ieva Rudzīte	Līga Avena	Daina Barone	Zane Brakovska	Riga, Latvia
Ilza Stabulniece	Anna Guste	Katrīna Gaidule	Betija Gulbe	Riga, Latvia
Tova Sundberg	Emma Sjödin	Maria Larsson	Sofie Bergman	Östersund, Sweden
Isabella Wranå	Jennie Wåhlin	Almida de Val	Fanny Sjöberg	Sundbyberg, Sweden
Sayaka Yoshimura	Kaho Onodera	Anna Ohmiya	Yumie Funayama	Sapporo, Japan
Zhang Di	Wang Meini	Fan Suyuan	Yan Hui	Harbin, China
Zhang Lijun	Zhao Ruiyi	Wang Ziyue	Cao Chang	Beijing, China

== Round robin standings ==
Final Round Robin Standings

Key
Teams to Playoffs

Pool A	W	L
(Sweden) Isabella Wranå	4	0
(Sweden) Tova Sundberg	2	2
(Switzerland) Aline Fellmann	2	2
(Finland) Pauline Jeanneret	1	3
(Latvia) Ieva Rudzīte	1	3

Pool B	W	L
(Japan) Sayaka Yoshimura	4	0
(China) Zhang Lijun	2	2
(China) Zhang Di	2	2
(Finland) Oona Kauste	2	2
(Latvia) Ilza Stabulniece	0	4

== Round robin results ==
All draw times are listed in Eastern European Time (UTC+02:00).

=== Draw 1 ===
Thursday, October 18, 12:30 pm

Sheet 1	1	2	3	4	5	6	7	8	Final
(Finland) Pauline Jeanneret	0	2	0	2	0	0	1	X	5
(Sweden) Isabella Wranå	3	0	3	0	3	2	0	X	11

Sheet 2	1	2	3	4	5	6	7	8	Final
(Latvia) Ilza Stabulniece	0	0	0	1	0	0	1	0	2
(Japan) Sayaka Yoshimura	3	1	1	0	0	1	0	1	7

=== Draw 2 ===
Thursday, October 18, 4:30 pm

Sheet 1	1	2	3	4	5	6	7	8	Final
(Switzerland) Aline Fellmann	0	1	0	0	0	1	0	X	2
(Sweden) Tova Sundberg	1	0	1	1	1	0	0	X	4

Sheet 2	1	2	3	4	5	6	7	8	Final
(China) Zhang Di	1	1	0	3	0	2	0	X	7
(Finland) Oona Kauste	0	0	1	0	1	0	2	X	4

=== Draw 3 ===
Thursday, October 18, 8:30 pm

Sheet 1	1	2	3	4	5	6	7	8	Final
(Latvia) Ieva Rudzīte	0	3	0	0	3	2	0	X	8
(Finland) Pauline Jeanneret	2	0	1	1	0	0	1	X	5

Sheet 2	1	2	3	4	5	6	7	8	Final
(China) Zhang Lijun	0	1	0	1	2	0	2	X	6
(Latvia) Ilza Stabulniece	0	0	0	0	0	2	0	X	2

=== Draw 4 ===
Friday, October 19, 9:00 am

Sheet 1	1	2	3	4	5	6	7	8	Final
(Sweden) Isabella Wranå	2	0	3	0	1	1	X	X	7
(Switzerland) Aline Fellmann	0	0	0	1	0	0	X	X	1

Sheet 2	1	2	3	4	5	6	7	8	Final
(Japan) Sayaka Yoshimura	4	1	1	0	2	0	3	X	11
(China) Zhang Di	0	0	0	1	0	3	0	X	4

=== Draw 5 ===
Friday, October 19, 12:30 pm

Sheet 1	1	2	3	4	5	6	7	8	Final
(Sweden) Tova Sundberg	2	0	4	1	1	X	X	X	8
(Latvia) Ieva Rudzīte	0	2	0	0	0	X	X	X	2

Sheet 2	1	2	3	4	5	6	7	8	Final
(Finland) Oona Kauste	0	0	2	1	1	0	1	X	5
(China) Zhang Lijun	1	0	0	0	0	1	0	X	2

=== Draw 6 ===
Friday, October 19, 4:00 pm

Sheet 1	1	2	3	4	5	6	7	8	Final
(Latvia) Ilza Stabulniece	0	1	0	0	1	0	X	X	2
(China) Zhang Di	3	0	1	1	0	3	X	X	8

Sheet 2	1	2	3	4	5	6	7	8	Final
(Finland) Pauline Jeanneret	0	0	1	2	1	0	1	X	5
(Switzerland) Aline Fellmann	3	2	0	0	0	2	0	X	7

=== Draw 7 ===
Friday, October 19, 7:30 pm

Sheet 1	1	2	3	4	5	6	7	8	Final
(China) Zhang Lijun	0	0	0	1	0	0	3	X	4
(Japan) Sayaka Yoshimura	0	0	1	0	2	4	0	X	7

Sheet 2	1	2	3	4	5	6	7	8	Final
(Latvia) Ieva Rudzīte	0	1	0	0	3	0	1	X	5
(Sweden) Isabella Wranå	4	0	0	2	0	2	0	X	8

=== Draw 8 ===
Saturday, October 20, 8:30 am

Sheet 1	1	2	3	4	5	6	7	8	Final
(Finland) Oona Kauste	4	0	1	0	1	2	X	X	8
(Latvia) Ilza Stabulniece	0	2	0	1	0	0	X	X	3

Sheet 2	1	2	3	4	5	6	7	8	Final
(Sweden) Tova Sundberg	0	1	0	1	1	1	1	0	5
(Finland) Pauline Jeanneret	3	0	1	0	0	0	0	2	6

=== Draw 9 ===
Saturday, October 20, 12:00 pm

Sheet 1	1	2	3	4	5	6	7	8	Final
(China) Zhang Di	0	1	0	0	0	1	0	0	2
(China) Zhang Lijun	1	0	0	1	1	0	0	3	6

Sheet 2	1	2	3	4	5	6	7	8	Final
(Switzerland) Aline Fellmann	1	1	0	1	1	0	0	1	5
(Latvia) Ieva Rudzīte	0	0	1	0	0	1	1	0	3

=== Draw 10 ===
Saturday, October 20, 3:30 pm

Sheet 1	1	2	3	4	5	6	7	8	Final
(Japan) Sayaka Yoshimura	1	0	0	4	0	1	1	1	8
(Finland) Oona Kauste	0	2	2	0	2	0	0	0	6

Sheet 2	1	2	3	4	5	6	7	8	9	Final
(Sweden) Isabella Wranå	0	0	1	0	0	0	2	0	1	4
(Sweden) Tova Sundberg	1	0	0	0	1	0	0	1	0	3

== Playoffs ==
Quarterfinals
B2	(China) Zhang Lijun	4
A3	(Switzerland) Aline Fellmann	6
A2	(Sweden) Tova Sundberg	7
B3	(China) Zhang Di	6

Semifinals
A1	(Sweden) Isabella Wranå	6
A3	(Switzerland) Aline Fellmann	4
B1	(Japan) Sayaka Yoshimura	7
A2	(Sweden) Tova Sundberg	3

Final
A1	(Sweden) Isabella Wranå	5
B1	(Japan) Sayaka Yoshimura	3
Third place
A3	(Switzerland) Aline Fellmann	3
A2	(Sweden) Tova Sundberg	6

=== Quarterfinals ===
Saturday, October 20, 7:30 pm

Sheet 1	1	2	3	4	5	6	7	8	Final
(Sweden) Tova Sundberg	2	0	0	1	0	0	4	0	7
(China) Zhang Di	0	0	2	0	1	1	0	2	6

Sheet 2	1	2	3	4	5	6	7	8	9	Final
(China) Zhang Lijun	0	2	0	0	0	0	2	0	0	4
(Switzerland) Aline Fellmann	0	0	0	1	1	0	0	2	2	6

=== Semifinals ===
Sunday, October 21, 10:00 am

Sheet 1	1	2	3	4	5	6	7	8	Final
(Sweden) Isabella Wranå	2	0	2	0	0	2	0	X	6
(Switzerland) Aline Fellmann	0	2	0	1	0	0	1	X	4

Sheet 2	1	2	3	4	5	6	7	8	Final
(Japan) Sayaka Yoshimura	2	0	1	2	1	0	1	X	7
(Sweden) Tova Sundberg	0	1	0	0	0	2	0	X	3

=== Third place game ===
Sunday, October 21, 2:30 pm

Sheet 1	1	2	3	4	5	6	7	8	Final
(Switzerland) Aline Fellmann	0	1	0	0	2	0	0	X	3
(Sweden) Tova Sundberg	3	0	1	1	0	0	1	X	6

=== Final ===
Sunday, October 21, 2:30 pm

Sheet 2	1	2	3	4	5	6	7	8	Final
(Sweden) Isabella Wranå	0	1	0	1	0	2	0	1	5
(Japan) Sayaka Yoshimura	0	0	0	0	1	0	2	0	3
