= 2018 Tour Challenge =

Grand Slam of Curling event

- Host city: Thunder Bay, Ontario
- Arena: Tournament Centre
- Dates: November 6–11
- Men's winner: (Ontario) Brad Jacobs
- Curling club: Community First CC, Sault Ste. Marie, ON
- Skip: Brad Jacobs
- Third: Ryan Fry
- Second: E. J. Harnden
- Lead: Ryan Harnden
- Coach: Adam Kingsbury
- Finalist: (Alberta) Brendan Bottcher
- Women's winner: (Ontario) Rachel Homan
- Curling club: Ottawa CC, Ottawa, ON
- Skip: Rachel Homan
- Third: Emma Miskew
- Second: Joanne Courtney
- Lead: Lisa Weagle
- Finalist: (Manitoba) Tracy Fleury

The 2018 Tour Challenge was held from November 6 to 11 at the Tournament Centre in Thunder Bay, Ontario. This was the third Grand Slam of the 2018–19 curling season.

In the men's Tier 1 competition, Brad Jacobs defeated Brendan Bottcher in the final 6–5. Team Bottcher was playing in their first Grand Slam final. In Tier 2, Kirk Muyres defeated Scott McDonald's team in the final to secure a spot in the 2019 Canadian Open.

The women's Tier 1 competition saw Rachel Homan defeat Tracy Fleury 8–4. In the Tier 2 final, Elena Stern beat Sayaka Yoshimura 6–5, qualifying for the 2019 Canadian Open.

== Qualification ==
The Tour Challenge consists of two tiers of 15 teams. For Tier 1, the top 15 teams on the World Curling Tour's Order of Merit rankings as of October 1, 2018. If any teams declined, the next highest team was invited until the field of 15 teams was complete. For Tier 2, the next 10 teams on the OOM rankings are invited. The final 5 teams in Tier 2 are filled by regional invitations extended by the Grand Slam of Curling.

=== Men ===
Top Order of Merit men's teams as of October 1:

1. (Newfoundland and Labrador) Brad Gushue
2. (Sweden) Niklas Edin
3. (Alberta) Kevin Koe
4. (Scotland) ~~Bruce Mouat~~
5. (Ontario) Brad Jacobs
6. (Manitoba) Reid Carruthers
7. (Ontario) John Epping
8. (Manitoba) Jason Gunnlaugson
9. (Switzerland) ~~Peter de Cruz~~
10. (Ontario) Glenn Howard
11. (Norway) ~~Steffen Walstad~~
12. (Alberta) Brendan Bottcher
13. (United States) John Shuster
14. (Norway) ~~Thomas Ulsrud~~
15. (United States) Rich Ruohonen
16. (Scotland) Ross Paterson
17. (Switzerland) ~~Yannick Schwaller~~
18. (Saskatchewan) Matt Dunstone
19. (Manitoba) Braden Calvert

=== Women ===
Top Order of Merit women's teams as of October 1:

1. (Sweden) ~~Anna Hasselborg~~
2. (Manitoba) Jennifer Jones
3. (Ontario) Rachel Homan
4. (Manitoba) Tracy Fleury
5. (Alberta) Laura Walker
6. (Scotland) ~~Eve Muirhead~~
7. (United States) Jamie Sinclair
8. (United States) Nina Roth
9. (Switzerland) Silvana Tirinzoni
10. (Japan) ~~Satsuki Fujisawa~~
11. (South Korea) ~~Kim Eun-jung~~
12. (Manitoba) Kerri Einarson
13. (Manitoba) Darcy Robertson
14. (Alberta) Casey Scheidegger
15. (Alberta) Chelsea Carey
16. (Sweden) Isabella Wranå
17. (Manitoba) Allison Flaxey
18. (Russia) ~~Anna Sidorova~~
19. (United States) Cory Christensen
20. (Ontario) Krista McCarville

== Men ==
=== Tier 1 ===
==== Teams ====
Skip	Third	Second	Lead	Locale
Brendan Bottcher	Darren Moulding	Bradley Thiessen	Karrick Martin	Edmonton, Alberta
Braden Calvert	Kyle Kurz	Ian McMillan	Rob Gordon	Winnipeg, Manitoba
Mike McEwen (Fourth)	Reid Carruthers (Skip)	Derek Samagalski	Colin Hodgson	Winnipeg, Manitoba
Benoît Schwarz (Fourth)	Sven Michel	Peter de Cruz (Skip)	Valentin Tanner	Geneva, Switzerland
Matt Dunstone	Braeden Moskowy	Catlin Schneider	Dustin Kidby	Regina, Saskatchewan
Niklas Edin	Oskar Eriksson	Rasmus Wranå	Christoffer Sundgren	Karlstad, Sweden
John Epping	Mat Camm	Brent Laing	Craig Savill	Toronto, Ontario
Jason Gunnlaugson	Alex Forrest	Denni Neufeld	Connor Njegovan	Morris, Manitoba
Brad Gushue	Mark Nichols	Brett Gallant	Geoff Walker	St. John's, Newfoundland and Labrador
Glenn Howard	Scott Howard	David Mathers	Tim March	Penetanguishene, Ontario
Brad Jacobs	Ryan Fry	E. J. Harnden	Ryan Harnden	Sault Ste. Marie, Ontario
Kevin Koe	B. J. Neufeld	Colton Flasch	Ben Hebert	Calgary, Alberta
Ross Paterson	Kyle Waddell	Duncan Menzies	Michael Goodfellow	Glasgow, Scotland
Greg Persinger (Fourth)	Rich Ruohonen (Skip)	Colin Hufman	Phil Tilker	Chaska, United States
John Shuster	Chris Plys	Matt Hamilton	John Landsteiner	Duluth, United States

==== Round-robin standings ====
Key
Teams to playoffs
Teams to tiebreakers

Pool A	W	L	PF	PA
(Newfoundland and Labrador) Brad Gushue	4	0	29	16
(United States) Rich Ruohonen	3	1	26	20
(Ontario) John Epping	1	3	21	25
(Manitoba) Jason Gunnlaugson	1	3	14	22
(Scotland) Ross Paterson	1	3	21	28

Pool B	W	L	PF	PA
(Switzerland) Peter de Cruz	3	1	23	18
(United States) John Shuster	3	1	22	17
(Saskatchewan) Matt Dunstone	2	2	15	19
(Sweden) Niklas Edin	1	3	15	17
(Manitoba) Reid Carruthers	1	3	17	21

Pool C	W	L	PF	PA
(Ontario) Brad Jacobs	3	1	16	11
(Alberta) Brendan Bottcher	3	1	24	14
(Alberta) Kevin Koe	2	2	12	20
(Ontario) Glenn Howard	2	2	22	14
(Manitoba) Braden Calvert	0	4	12	27

==== Round-robin results ====
All draw times are listed in Eastern Daylight time (UTC-4).

===== Draw 1 =====
Tuesday, November 6, 7:00 pm

Sheet A	1	2	3	4	5	6	7	8	Final
(Ontario) Glenn Howard	0	2	3	4	0	X	X	X	9
(Manitoba) Braden Calvert 🔨	1	0	0	0	1	X	X	X	2

Sheet B	1	2	3	4	5	6	7	8	Final
(Newfoundland and Labrador) Brad Gushue 🔨	0	0	2	0	2	0	2	1	7
(United States) Rich Ruohonen	0	1	0	1	0	2	0	0	4

Sheet C	1	2	3	4	5	6	7	8	Final
(United States) John Shuster	0	2	0	1	0	1	1	1	6
(Saskatchewan) Matt Dunstone 🔨	2	0	0	0	1	0	0	0	3

===== Draw 2 =====
Wednesday, November 7, 8:00 am

Sheet C	1	2	3	4	5	6	7	8	Final
(Sweden) Niklas Edin 🔨	1	0	0	1	0	0	2	0	4
(Switzerland) Peter de Cruz	0	1	0	0	2	1	0	1	5

===== Draw 3 =====
Wednesday, November 7, 11:30 am

Sheet A	1	2	3	4	5	6	7	8	Final
(Manitoba) Jason Gunnlaugson 🔨	1	0	2	0	1	0	0	0	4
(United States) Rich Ruohonen	0	3	0	1	0	1	1	1	7

Sheet B	1	2	3	4	5	6	7	8	Final
(Manitoba) Reid Carruthers	0	0	1	2	1	0	1	0	5
(United States) John Shuster 🔨	0	3	0	0	0	1	0	3	7

Sheet D	1	2	3	4	5	6	7	8	Final
(Ontario) John Epping 🔨	2	0	1	0	2	2	0	1	8
(Scotland) Ross Paterson	0	2	0	2	0	0	1	0	5

Sheet E	1	2	3	4	5	6	7	8	Final
(Ontario) Brad Jacobs	0	0	2	0	2	0	0	1	5
(Alberta) Brendan Bottcher 🔨	2	0	0	2	0	0	0	0	4

===== Draw 4 =====
Wednesday, November 7, 3:00 pm

Sheet D	1	2	3	4	5	6	7	8	Final
(Alberta) Kevin Koe 🔨	2	0	2	0	0	2	0	X	6
(Manitoba) Braden Calvert	0	1	0	1	0	0	1	X	3

===== Draw 5 =====
Wednesday, November 7, 7:00 pm

Sheet A	1	2	3	4	5	6	7	8	Final
(Newfoundland and Labrador) Brad Gushue	0	1	0	4	0	4	0	1	10
(Ontario) John Epping 🔨	1	0	4	0	2	0	1	0	8

Sheet B	1	2	3	4	5	6	7	8	Final
(Sweden) Niklas Edin 🔨	1	0	0	2	0	1	0	0	4
(Saskatchewan) Matt Dunstone	0	0	2	0	0	0	2	1	5

Sheet C	1	2	3	4	5	6	7	8	Final
(Alberta) Brendan Bottcher	0	1	0	2	0	2	0	0	5
(Ontario) Glenn Howard 🔨	1	0	1	0	1	0	0	1	4

===== Draw 6 =====
Thursday, November 8, 8:00 am

Sheet A	1	2	3	4	5	6	7	8	Final
(Switzerland) Peter de Cruz 🔨	2	0	2	0	3	1	X	X	8
(Manitoba) Reid Carruthers	0	2	0	1	0	0	X	X	4

Sheet B	1	2	3	4	5	6	7	8	Final
(Manitoba) Jason Gunnlaugson	0	1	0	1	0	2	0	X	4
(Scotland) Ross Paterson 🔨	2	0	1	0	4	0	1	X	8

Sheet C	1	2	3	4	5	6	7	8	Final
(Ontario) Brad Jacobs 🔨	2	0	0	1	0	0	0	2	5
(Manitoba) Braden Calvert	0	2	0	0	0	0	1	0	3

===== Draw 7 =====
Thursday, November 8, 11:30 am

Sheet E	1	2	3	4	5	6	7	8	Final
(Sweden) Niklas Edin	1	0	0	1	0	1	0	0	3
(United States) John Shuster 🔨	0	0	1	0	1	0	0	2	4

===== Draw 8 =====
Thursday, November 8, 3:00 pm

Sheet B	1	2	3	4	5	6	7	8	Final
(Alberta) Kevin Koe	0	1	0	0	X	X	X	X	1
(Alberta) Brendan Bottcher 🔨	3	0	4	1	X	X	X	X	8

Sheet C	1	2	3	4	5	6	7	8	Final
(Manitoba) Reid Carruthers	0	1	0	0	2	0	2	X	5
(Saskatchewan) Matt Dunstone 🔨	0	0	1	0	0	1	0	X	2

Sheet D	1	2	3	4	5	6	7	8	Final
(Ontario) Brad Jacobs 🔨	0	1	0	0	0	2	2	X	5
(Ontario) Glenn Howard	0	0	0	1	0	0	0	X	1

Sheet E	1	2	3	4	5	6	7	8	Final
(Ontario) John Epping	1	0	1	0	1	0	1	0	4
(United States) Rich Ruohonen 🔨	0	1	0	2	0	2	0	0	5

===== Draw 9 =====
Thursday, November 8, 7:00 pm

Sheet D	1	2	3	4	5	6	7	8	Final
(Newfoundland and Labrador) Brad Gushue 🔨	0	2	0	1	1	2	X	X	6
(Manitoba) Jason Gunnlaugson	0	0	1	0	0	0	X	X	1

===== Draw 10 =====
Friday, November 9, 8:00 am

Sheet C	1	2	3	4	5	6	7	8	Final
(Scotland) Ross Paterson	0	3	0	1	0	1	0	X	5
(United States) Rich Ruohonen 🔨	2	0	3	0	3	0	2	X	10

Sheet E	1	2	3	4	5	6	7	8	Final
(Alberta) Kevin Koe	0	2	0	0	0	X	X	X	2
(Ontario) Glenn Howard 🔨	3	0	0	4	1	X	X	X	8

===== Draw 11 =====
Friday, November 9, 11:30 am

Sheet C	1	2	3	4	5	6	7	8	Final
(Ontario) John Epping	0	0	1	0	0	0	X	X	1
(Manitoba) Jason Gunnlaugson 🔨	2	0	0	2	1	0	X	X	5

Sheet E	1	2	3	4	5	6	7	8	Final
(Switzerland) Peter de Cruz 🔨	0	1	0	3	0	1	0	1	6
(United States) John Shuster	0	0	1	0	2	0	2	0	5

===== Draw 12 =====
Friday, November 9, 3:00 pm

Sheet A	1	2	3	4	5	6	7	8	Final
(Sweden) Niklas Edin 🔨	0	1	0	1	0	1	0	1	4
(Manitoba) Reid Carruthers	0	0	2	0	0	0	1	0	3

Sheet E	1	2	3	4	5	6	7	8	Final
(Alberta) Brendan Bottcher	2	0	0	2	1	0	1	1	7
(Manitoba) Braden Calvert 🔨	0	0	1	0	0	3	0	0	4

===== Draw 13 =====
Friday, November 9, 7:00 pm

Sheet B	1	2	3	4	5	6	7	8	Final
(Switzerland) Peter de Cruz	1	0	0	1	1	0	1	0	4
(Saskatchewan) Matt Dunstone 🔨	0	1	1	0	0	2	0	1	5

Sheet C	1	2	3	4	5	6	7	8	Final
(Alberta) Kevin Koe 🔨	0	0	0	2	0	0	1	X	3
(Ontario) Brad Jacobs	0	0	1	0	0	0	0	X	1

Sheet E	1	2	3	4	5	6	7	8	Final
(Newfoundland and Labrador) Brad Gushue 🔨	1	1	0	0	1	0	3	X	6
(Scotland) Ross Paterson	0	0	1	0	0	2	0	X	3

==== Tiebreaker ====
Saturday, November 10, 8:30 am

Sheet D	1	2	3	4	5	6	7	8	Final
(Saskatchewan) Matt Dunstone	0	2	0	2	0	0	0	X	4
(Ontario) Glenn Howard 🔨	0	0	2	0	1	2	1	X	6

==== Playoffs ====
Quarterfinals
1	(Newfoundland and Labrador) Brad Gushue	4
8	(Ontario) Glenn Howard	6
4	(Alberta) Brendan Bottcher	5
5	(United States) Rich Ruohonen	1
2	(Switzerland) Peter de Cruz	7
7	(Alberta) Kevin Koe	6
3	(Ontario) Brad Jacobs	7
6	(United States) John Shuster	6

Semifinals
8	(Ontario) Glenn Howard	2
4	(Alberta) Brendan Bottcher	5
2	(Switzerland) Peter de Cruz	3
3	(Ontario) Brad Jacobs	6

Final
4	(Alberta) Brendan Bottcher	5
3	(Ontario) Brad Jacobs	6

===== Quarterfinals =====
Saturday, November 10, 4:00 pm

Sheet B	1	2	3	4	5	6	7	8	Final
(Newfoundland and Labrador) Brad Gushue 🔨	1	0	0	0	2	0	1	0	4
(Ontario) Glenn Howard	0	0	2	1	0	2	0	1	6

Player percentages
(Newfoundland and Labrador) Brad Gushue		(Ontario) Glenn Howard	
Geoff Walker	93%	Tim March	90%
Brett Gallant	83%	David Mathers	92%
Mark Nichols	79%	Scott Howard	93%
Brad Gushue	83%	Glenn Howard	95%
Total	85%	Total	93%

Sheet C	1	2	3	4	5	6	7	8	Final
(Alberta) Brendan Bottcher	0	1	1	0	0	2	1	X	5
(United States) Rich Ruohonen 🔨	0	0	0	0	1	0	0	X	1

Player percentages
(Alberta) Brendan Bottcher		(United States) Rich Ruohonen	
Karrick Martin	90%	Phil Tilker	77%
Bradley Thiessen	71%	Colin Hufman	87%
Darren Moulding	82%	Rich Ruohonen	89%
Brendan Bottcher	93%	Greg Persinger	78%
Total	84%	Total	83%

Sheet D	1	2	3	4	5	6	7	8	Final
(Switzerland) Peter de Cruz 🔨	1	0	3	0	1	0	2	0	7
(Alberta) Kevin Koe	0	2	0	1	0	2	0	1	6

Player percentages
(Switzerland) Peter de Cruz		(Alberta) Kevin Koe	
Valentin Tanner	81%	Ben Hebert	86%
Peter de Cruz	81%	Colton Flasch	68%
Sven Michel	73%	B. J. Neufeld	89%
Benoît Schwarz	73%	Kevin Koe	68%
Total	77%	Total	78%

Sheet E	1	2	3	4	5	6	7	8	Final
(Ontario) Brad Jacobs 🔨	2	0	2	0	0	2	0	1	7
(United States) John Shuster	0	1	0	0	2	0	3	0	6

Player percentages
(Ontario) Brad Jacobs		(United States) John Shuster	
Ryan Harnden	92%	John Landsteiner	78%
E. J. Harnden	94%	Matt Hamilton	84%
Ryan Fry	93%	Chris Plys	83%
Brad Jacobs	82%	John Shuster	89%
Total	90%	Total	84%

===== Semifinals =====
Saturday, November 10, 8:00 pm

Sheet C	1	2	3	4	5	6	7	8	Final
(Switzerland) Peter de Cruz	0	0	1	0	2	0	0	X	3
(Ontario) Brad Jacobs 🔨	0	3	0	1	0	2	0	X	6

Player percentages
(Switzerland) Peter de Cruz		(Ontario) Brad Jacobs	
Valentin Tanner	89%	Ryan Harnden	90%
Peter de Cruz	64%	E. J. Harnden	91%
Sven Michel	62%	Ryan Fry	79%
Benoît Schwarz	86%	Brad Jacobs	89%
Total	75%	Total	87%

Sheet D	1	2	3	4	5	6	7	8	Final
(Ontario) Glenn Howard	0	0	0	0	1	0	1	0	2
(Alberta) Brendan Bottcher 🔨	0	0	0	2	0	2	0	1	5

Player percentages
(Ontario) Glenn Howard		(Alberta) Brendan Bottcher	
Tim March	80%	Karrick Martin	81%
David Mathers	70%	Bradley Thiessen	80%
Scott Howard	62%	Darren Moulding	78%
Glenn Howard	70%	Brendan Bottcher	84%
Total	71%	Total	81%

===== Final =====
Sunday, November 11, 4:00 pm

Sheet C	1	2	3	4	5	6	7	8	Final
(Alberta) Brendan Bottcher 🔨	0	1	0	1	0	2	1	0	5
(Ontario) Brad Jacobs	0	0	2	0	2	0	0	2	6

Player percentages
(Alberta) Brendan Bottcher		(Ontario) Brad Jacobs	
Karrick Martin	74%	Ryan Harnden	86%
Bradley Thiessen	64%	E. J. Harnden	82%
Darren Moulding	62%	Ryan Fry	81%
Brendan Bottcher	81%	Brad Jacobs	86%
Total	70%	Total	84%

=== Tier 2 ===
==== Round-robin standings ====
Key
Teams to playoffs
Teams to tiebreakers

Pool A	W	L
(Ontario) Tanner Horgan	3	1
(Ontario) Charley Thomas	3	1
(Scotland) Glen Muirhead	2	2
(United States) Andrew Stopera	2	2
(Manitoba) Dennis Bohn	0	4

Pool B	W	L
(Ontario) Scott McDonald	4	0
(United States) Mark Fenner	3	1
(Manitoba) William Lyburn	2	2
(Ontario) Dylan Johnston	1	3
(Ontario) Jordan Chandler	0	4

Pool C	W	L
(Saskatchewan) Kirk Muyres	4	0
(Ontario) Team Tuck	3	1
(Netherlands) Jaap van Dorp	2	2
(Manitoba) Tanner Lott	1	3
(Ontario) Colin Koivula	0	4

==== Tiebreakers ====
- (Scotland) Muirhead 5-2 Stopera (United States)
- (Netherlands) van Dorp 7-4 Lyburn (Manitoba)

==== Playoffs ====
Quarterfinals
1	(Ontario) Scott McDonald	10
8	(Netherlands) Jaap van Dorp	1
4	(United States) Mark Fenner	7
5	(Ontario) Tanner Horgan	5
2	(Saskatchewan) Kirk Muyres	5
7	(Scotland) Glen Muirhead	4
3	(Ontario) Charley Thomas	8
6	(Ontario) Team Tuck	6

Semifinals
1	(Ontario) Scott McDonald	7
4	(United States) Mark Fenner	5
2	(Saskatchewan) Kirk Muyres	6
3	(Ontario) Charley Thomas	5

Final
1	(Ontario) Scott McDonald	3
2	(Saskatchewan) Kirk Muyres	8

== Women ==
=== Tier 1 ===
==== Teams ====
Skip	Third	Second	Lead	Locale
Chelsea Carey	Sarah Wilkes	Dana Ferguson	Heather Rogers	Edmonton, Alberta
Cory Christensen	Vicky Persinger	Jenna Martin	Madison Bear	Chaska, United States
Kerri Einarson	Val Sweeting	Shannon Birchard	Briane Meilleur	Gimli, Manitoba
Allison Flaxey	Kate Cameron	Taylor McDonald	Raunora Westcott	Winnipeg, Manitoba
Tracy Fleury	Selena Njegovan	Liz Fyfe	Kristin MacCuish	East St. Paul, Manitoba
Rachel Homan	Emma Miskew	Joanne Courtney	Lisa Weagle	Ottawa, Ontario
Jennifer Jones	Kaitlyn Lawes	Jocelyn Peterman	Dawn McEwen	Winnipeg, Manitoba
Krista McCarville	Kendra Lilly	Ashley Sippala	Sarah Potts	Thunder Bay, Ontario
Darcy Robertson	Karen Klein	Vanessa Foster	Theresa Cannon	Winnipeg, Manitoba
Nina Roth	Tabitha Peterson	Aileen Geving	Becca Hamilton	Chaska, United States
Casey Scheidegger	Cary-Anne McTaggart	Jessie Haughian	Kristie Moore	Lethbridge, Alberta
Jamie Sinclair	Alex Carlson	Sarah Anderson	Monica Walker	Chaska, United States
Alina Pätz (Fourth)	Silvana Tirinzoni (Skip)	Esther Neuenschwander	Melanie Barbezat	Aarau, Switzerland
Laura Walker	Cathy Overton-Clapham	Lori Olson-Johns	Laine Peters	Edmonton, Alberta
Isabella Wranå	Jennie Wåhlin	Almida de Val	Fanny Sjöberg	Stockholm, Sweden

==== Round-robin standings ====
Key
Teams to playoffs

Pool A	W	L	PF	PA
(United States) Nina Roth	3	1	24	18
(Manitoba) Jennifer Jones	3	1	26	16
(Switzerland) Silvana Tirinzoni	2	2	16	18
(Manitoba) Allison Flaxey	1	3	20	22
(Sweden) Isabella Wranå	1	3	13	25

Pool B	W	L	PF	PA
(Ontario) Rachel Homan	4	0	30	10
(Manitoba) Kerri Einarson	3	1	18	16
(United States) Jamie Sinclair	1	3	13	19
(United States) Cory Christensen	1	3	16	25
(Alberta) Chelsea Carey	1	3	18	24

Pool C	W	L	PF	PA
(Manitoba) Tracy Fleury	4	0	28	11
(Manitoba) Darcy Robertson	2	2	19	25
(Alberta) Laura Walker	2	2	20	20
(Ontario) Krista McCarville	1	3	14	22
(Alberta) Casey Scheidegger	1	3	17	20

==== Round-robin results ====
All draw times are listed in Eastern Daylight time (UTC-4).

===== Draw 1 =====
Tuesday, November 6, 7:00 pm

Sheet C	1	2	3	4	5	6	7	8	Final
(Alberta) Chelsea Carey 🔨	0	0	0	2	0	1	1	1	5
(United States) Jamie Sinclair	0	0	1	0	1	0	0	0	2

Sheet D	1	2	3	4	5	6	7	8	Final
(Alberta) Laura Walker 🔨	1	0	4	2	1	0	X	X	8
(Ontario) Krista McCarville	0	1	0	0	0	1	X	X	2

===== Draw 2 =====
Wednesday, November 7, 8:00 am

Sheet C	1	2	3	4	5	6	7	8	Final
(Sweden) Isabella Wranå	1	0	0	0	0	X	X	X	1
(Manitoba) Allison Flaxey 🔨	0	3	2	0	4	X	X	X	9

Sheet D	1	2	3	4	5	6	7	8	Final
(Alberta) Casey Scheidegger 🔨	1	0	1	0	1	0	2	0	5
(Manitoba) Darcy Robertson	0	2	0	3	0	1	0	0	6

Sheet E	1	2	3	4	5	6	7	8	Final
(Manitoba) Kerri Einarson	0	1	1	0	1	1	0	1	5
(United States) Cory Christensen 🔨	1	0	0	1	0	0	1	0	3

===== Draw 3 =====
Wednesday, November 7, 11:30 am

Sheet C	1	2	3	4	5	6	7	8	Final
(United States) Nina Roth 🔨	3	0	0	0	2	1	0	X	6
(Switzerland) Silvana Tirinzoni	0	1	0	1	0	0	2	X	4

===== Draw 4 =====
Wednesday, November 7, 3:00 pm

Sheet A	1	2	3	4	5	6	7	8	Final
(Manitoba) Jennifer Jones	0	0	2	0	0	3	1	0	6
(Sweden) Isabella Wranå 🔨	3	1	0	1	1	0	0	1	7

Sheet B	1	2	3	4	5	6	7	8	Final
(Ontario) Rachel Homan 🔨	0	1	1	1	0	0	0	4	7
(United States) Jamie Sinclair	0	0	0	0	1	1	1	0	3

Sheet C	1	2	3	4	5	6	7	8	Final
(Manitoba) Tracy Fleury	1	0	1	1	1	0	4	X	8
(Alberta) Laura Walker 🔨	0	1	0	0	0	2	0	X	3

Sheet E	1	2	3	4	5	6	7	8	Final
(Manitoba) Darcy Robertson 🔨	2	0	1	1	0	1	1	1	7
(Ontario) Krista McCarville	0	1	0	0	3	0	0	0	4

===== Draw 5 =====
Wednesday, November 7, 7:00 pm

Sheet D	1	2	3	4	5	6	7	8	Final
(Manitoba) Kerri Einarson 🔨	3	0	0	2	1	1	0	X	7
(Alberta) Chelsea Carey	0	1	1	0	0	0	1	X	3

Sheet E	1	2	3	4	5	6	7	8	Final
(Switzerland) Silvana Tirinzoni	0	1	0	3	0	1	2	X	7
(Manitoba) Allison Flaxey 🔨	0	0	1	0	1	0	0	X	2

===== Draw 6 =====
Thursday, November 8, 8:00 am

Sheet D	1	2	3	4	5	6	7	8	Final
(United States) Nina Roth 🔨	2	0	1	1	1	0	1	X	6
(Sweden) Isabella Wranå	0	1	0	0	0	1	0	X	2

Sheet E	1	2	3	4	5	6	7	8	Final
(Alberta) Laura Walker	0	0	2	0	2	0	0	1	5
(Manitoba) Darcy Robertson 🔨	1	0	0	1	0	1	1	0	4

===== Draw 7 =====
Thursday, November 8, 11:30 am

Sheet A	1	2	3	4	5	6	7	8	Final
(United States) Jamie Sinclair 🔨	1	0	0	0	1	0	1	0	3
(Manitoba) Kerri Einarson	0	1	0	1	0	1	0	1	4

Sheet B	1	2	3	4	5	6	7	8	Final
(Manitoba) Tracy Fleury	1	0	1	0	2	0	0	1	5
(Alberta) Casey Scheidegger 🔨	0	0	0	1	0	2	0	0	3

Sheet C	1	2	3	4	5	6	7	8	Final
(Manitoba) Jennifer Jones	1	2	2	0	0	1	1	X	7
(Manitoba) Allison Flaxey 🔨	0	0	0	1	2	0	0	X	3

Sheet D	1	2	3	4	5	6	7	8	Final
(Ontario) Rachel Homan 🔨	0	3	0	4	0	1	X	X	8
(United States) Cory Christensen	0	0	1	0	1	0	X	X	2

===== Draw 8 =====
Thursday, November 8, 3:00 pm

Sheet A	1	2	3	4	5	6	7	8	Final
(Switzerland) Silvana Tirinzoni 🔨	0	1	0	0	2	1	0	0	4
(Sweden) Isabella Wranå	1	0	0	1	0	0	0	1	3

===== Draw 9 =====
Thursday, November 8, 7:00 pm

Sheet A	1	2	3	4	5	6	7	8	Final
(Manitoba) Jennifer Jones	0	0	2	0	3	0	0	1	6
(United States) Nina Roth 🔨	1	1	0	1	0	1	1	0	5

Sheet B	1	2	3	4	5	6	7	8	9	Final
(Alberta) Chelsea Carey	2	0	1	1	0	0	3	0	0	7
(United States) Cory Christensen 🔨	0	3	0	0	1	2	0	1	1	8

Sheet C	1	2	3	4	5	6	7	8	Final
(Manitoba) Tracy Fleury	1	1	0	1	0	1	0	X	4
(Ontario) Krista McCarville 🔨	0	0	1	0	1	0	1	X	3

Sheet E	1	2	3	4	5	6	7	8	Final
(Ontario) Rachel Homan	0	1	2	0	0	4	X	X	7
(Manitoba) Kerri Einarson 🔨	1	0	0	1	0	0	X	X	2

===== Draw 10 =====
Friday, November 9, 8:00 am

Sheet A	1	2	3	4	5	6	7	8	Final
(Alberta) Laura Walker 🔨	0	2	0	1	0	1	0	0	4
(Alberta) Casey Scheidegger	0	0	2	0	1	0	0	3	6

===== Draw 11 =====
Friday, November 9, 11:30 am

Sheet A	1	2	3	4	5	6	7	8	Final
(Manitoba) Tracy Fleury 🔨	3	0	1	1	2	4	X	X	11
(Manitoba) Darcy Robertson	0	2	0	0	0	0	X	X	2

Sheet B	1	2	3	4	5	6	7	8	Final
(Manitoba) Jennifer Jones 🔨	1	0	2	0	1	3	X	X	7
(Switzerland) Silvana Tirinzoni	0	0	0	1	0	0	X	X	1

Sheet E	1	2	3	4	5	6	7	8	9	Final
(United States) Nina Roth 🔨	2	0	1	0	2	0	1	0	1	7
(Manitoba) Allison Flaxey	0	1	0	1	0	1	0	3	0	6

===== Draw 12 =====
Friday, November 9, 3:00 pm

Sheet B	1	2	3	4	5	6	7	8	Final
(Alberta) Casey Scheidegger 🔨	1	0	0	1	0	0	1	0	3
(Ontario) Krista McCarville	0	2	1	0	1	0	0	1	5

Sheet C	1	2	3	4	5	6	7	8	Final
(Ontario) Rachel Homan 🔨	0	4	1	0	0	3	X	X	8
(Alberta) Chelsea Carey	0	0	0	2	1	0	X	X	3

Sheet D	1	2	3	4	5	6	7	8	Final
(United States) Jamie Sinclair	0	1	0	0	2	0	1	1	5
(United States) Cory Christensen 🔨	1	0	1	0	0	1	0	0	3

==== Playoffs ====
Quarterfinals
1	(Ontario) Rachel Homan	5
8	(Alberta) Laura Walker	3
4	(United States) Nina Roth	6
5	(Manitoba) Jennifer Jones	5
2	(Manitoba) Tracy Fleury	6
7	(Manitoba) Darcy Robertson	3
3	(Manitoba) Kerri Einarson	5
6	(Switzerland) Silvana Tirinzoni	4

Semifinals
1	(Ontario) Rachel Homan	6
4	(United States) Nina Roth	5
2	(Manitoba) Tracy Fleury	6
3	(Manitoba) Kerri Einarson	3

Final
1	(Ontario) Rachel Homan	8
2	(Manitoba) Tracy Fleury	4

===== Quarterfinals =====
Saturday, November 10, 12:00 pm

Sheet B	1	2	3	4	5	6	7	8	Final
(Manitoba) Tracy Fleury 🔨	2	0	1	0	1	1	0	1	6
(Manitoba) Darcy Robertson	0	1	0	1	0	0	1	0	3

Player percentages
(Manitoba) Tracy Fleury		(Manitoba) Darcy Robertson	
Kristin MacCuish	86%	Theresa Cannon	83%
Liz Fyfe	90%	Vanessa Foster	83%
Selena Njegovan	83%	Karen Klein	83%
Tracy Fleury	88%	Darcy Robertson	80%
Total	89%	Total	82%

Sheet C	1	2	3	4	5	6	7	8	Final
(United States) Nina Roth 🔨	0	1	0	1	0	2	0	2	6
(Manitoba) Jennifer Jones	0	0	1	0	3	0	1	0	5

Player percentages
(United States) Nina Roth		(Manitoba) Jennifer Jones	
Tara Peterson	79%	Dawn McEwen	76%
Becca Hamilton	79%	Jocelyn Peterman	73%
Tabitha Peterson	76%	Kaitlyn Lawes	64%
Nina Roth	74%	Jennifer Jones	65%
Total	76%	Total	70%

Sheet D	1	2	3	4	5	6	7	8	Final
(Manitoba) Kerri Einarson 🔨	2	0	0	2	0	0	0	1	5
(Switzerland) Silvana Tirinzoni	0	2	1	0	0	1	0	0	4

Player percentages
(Manitoba) Kerri Einarson		(Switzerland) Silvana Tirinzoni	
Briane Meilleur	80%	Melanie Barbezat	69%
Shannon Birchard	72%	Esther Neuenschwander	81%
Val Sweeting	88%	Alina Pätz	82%
Kerri Einarson	76%	Silvana Tirinzoni	73%
Total	79%	Total	74%

Sheet E	1	2	3	4	5	6	7	8	Final
(Ontario) Rachel Homan 🔨	0	0	3	1	1	0	0	X	5
(Alberta) Laura Walker	0	2	0	0	0	1	0	X	3

Player percentages
(Ontario) Rachel Homan		(Alberta) Laura Walker	
Lisa Weagle	79%	Laine Peters	94%
Joanne Courtney	88%	Lori Olson-Johns	75%
Emma Miskew	88%	Cathy Overton-Clapham	87%
Rachel Homan	83%	Laura Walker	77%
Total	84%	Total	83%

===== Semifinals =====
Saturday, November 10, 8:00 pm

Sheet B	1	2	3	4	5	6	7	8	9	Final
(Ontario) Rachel Homan 🔨	0	0	3	0	1	0	1	0	1	6
(United States) Nina Roth	0	1	0	1	0	2	0	1	0	5

Player percentages
(Ontario) Rachel Homan		(United States) Nina Roth	
Lisa Weagle	80%	Tara Peterson	84%
Joanne Courtney	82%	Becca Hamilton	73%
Emma Miskew	75%	Tabitha Peterson	80%
Rachel Homan	83%	Nina Roth	75%
Total	80%	Total	78%

Sheet E	1	2	3	4	5	6	7	8	Final
(Manitoba) Tracy Fleury 🔨	1	1	0	0	2	0	2	X	6
(Manitoba) Kerri Einarson	0	0	0	2	0	1	0	X	3

Player percentages
(Manitoba) Tracy Fleury		(Manitoba) Kerri Einarson	
Kristin MacCuish	95%	Briane Meilleur	73%
Liz Fyfe	79%	Shannon Birchard	73%
Selena Njegovan	76%	Val Sweeting	69%
Tracy Fleury	77%	Kerri Einarson	72%
Total	82%	Total	72%

===== Final =====
Sunday, November 11, 12:00 pm

Sheet C	1	2	3	4	5	6	7	8	Final
(Ontario) Rachel Homan	0	3	1	0	3	0	1	X	8
(Manitoba) Tracy Fleury 🔨	1	0	0	1	0	2	0	X	4

Player percentages
(Ontario) Rachel Homan		(Manitoba) Tracy Fleury	
Lisa Weagle	74%	Kristin MacCuish	79%
Joanne Courtney	75%	Liz Fyfe	75%
Emma Miskew	80%	Selena Njegovan	61%
Rachel Homan	85%	Tracy Fleury	66%
Total	78%	Total	70%

=== Tier 2 ===
==== Round-robin standings ====
Key
Teams to playoffs
Teams to tiebreakers

Pool A	W	L
(Japan) Sayaka Yoshimura	4	0
(Ontario) Hollie Duncan	3	1
(Ontario) Susan Froud	2	2
(Ontario) Jenna Enge	1	3
(United States) Annmarie Dubberstein	0	4

Pool B	W	L
(Switzerland) Binia Feltscher	3	1
(Switzerland) Elena Stern	3	1
(Ontario) Kira Brunton	2	2
(Ontario) Jacqueline Harrison	2	2
(Nova Scotia) Mary-Anne Arsenault	0	4

Pool C	W	L
(South Korea) Gim Un-chi	4	0
(Alberta) Kelsey Rocque	2	2
(Saskatchewan) Kristen Streifel	2	2
(Ontario) Julie Tippin	2	2
(Ontario) Hailey Beaudry	0	4

==== Tiebreakers ====
- (Ontario) Froud 2-8 Rocque (Alberta)
- (Saskatchewan) Streifel 10-3 Brunton (Ontario)
- (Ontario) Harrison 4-7 Tippin (Ontario)

==== Playoffs ====
Quarterfinals
1	(South Korea) Gim Un-chi	6
8	(Saskatchewan) Kristen Streifel	8
4	(Switzerland) Binia Feltscher	4
5	(Switzerland) Elena Stern	7
2	(Japan) Sayaka Yoshimura	7
7	(Ontario) Julie Tippin	5
3	(Ontario) Hollie Duncan	10
6	(Alberta) Kelsey Rocque	7

Semifinals
8	(Saskatchewan) Kristen Streifel	1
5	(Switzerland) Elena Stern	9
2	(Japan) Sayaka Yoshimura	7
3	(Ontario) Hollie Duncan	4

Final
5	(Switzerland) Elena Stern	6
2	(Japan) Sayaka Yoshimura	5
