= 2019 National =

Grand Slam of Curling event

2019 BOOST National
- Host city: Conception Bay South, Newfoundland and Labrador
- Arena: Conception Bay South Arena
- Dates: December 10–15
- Men's winner: (Ontario) Team Jacobs
- Curling club: Soo Curlers Association, Sault Ste. Marie
- Skip: Brad Jacobs
- Third: Marc Kennedy
- Second: E. J. Harnden
- Lead: Ryan Harnden
- Finalist: (Sweden) Niklas Edin
- Women's winner: (Sweden) Team Hasselborg
- Curling club: Sundbybergs CK, Sundbyberg
- Skip: Anna Hasselborg
- Third: Sara McManus
- Second: Agnes Knochenhauer
- Lead: Sofia Mabergs
- Finalist: (Manitoba) Jennifer Jones

The 2019 BOOST National was held from December 10 to 15, at the Conception Bay South Arena in Conception Bay South, Newfoundland and Labrador. It was the third Grand Slam and second major of the 2019–20 season.

In the men's final, Team Brad Jacobs defeated Team Niklas Edin 3–1 to win their second consecutive Grand Slam event. In the women's final, Team Anna Hasselborg also won their second consecutive Grand Slam event, defeating Team Jennifer Jones 7–3.

== Qualification ==
The top 14 men's and women's teams on the World Curling Tour order of merit standings as of November 5, 2019 qualified for the event. The Grand Slam of Curling may fill one spot in each division as a sponsor's exemption. In the event that a team declines their invitation, the next-ranked team on the order of merit is invited until the field is complete. The sponsor's exemption was not used, and the spot was allocated to the highest-ranked remaining team on the order of merit. The teams were seeded in pools per the rankings on November 19, 2019

=== Men ===
Top Order of Merit men's teams as of November 5:

1. (Ontario) John Epping
2. (Alberta) Kevin Koe
3. (Ontario) Brad Jacobs
4. (Scotland) Bruce Mouat
5. (Switzerland) Peter de Cruz
6. (Alberta) Brendan Bottcher
7. (Scotland) Ross Paterson
8. (Sweden) Niklas Edin
9. (Newfoundland and Labrador) Brad Gushue
10. (Saskatchewan) Matt Dunstone
11. (Switzerland) Yannick Schwaller
12. (Manitoba) Mike McEwen
13. (Ontario) Scott McDonald
14. (Ontario) Glenn Howard
15. (Japan) Yuta Matsumura

=== Women ===
Top Order of Merit women's teams as of November 5:

1. (Manitoba) Kerri Einarson
2. (Switzerland) Silvana Tirinzoni
3. (Ontario) Rachel Homan
4. (Sweden) Anna Hasselborg
5. (Manitoba) Tracy Fleury
6. (Manitoba) Jennifer Jones
7. (Japan) Satsuki Fujisawa
8. (Alberta) Chelsea Carey
9. (Switzerland) Elena Stern
10. (Japan) Sayaka Yoshimura
11. (Scotland) Eve Muirhead
12. (Alberta) Casey Scheidegger
13. (Sweden) Isabella Wranå
14. (Alberta) Kelsey Rocque
15. (Saskatchewan) Robyn Silvernagle

== Men ==
=== Teams ===
The teams are listed as follows:

Skip	Third	Second	Lead	Locale
Brendan Bottcher	Darren Moulding	Brad Thiessen	Karrick Martin	Edmonton, Alberta
Benoît Schwarz (Fourth)	Sven Michel	Peter de Cruz (Skip)	Valentin Tanner	Geneva, Switzerland
Matt Dunstone	Braeden Moskowy	Catlin Schneider	Dustin Kidby	Regina, Saskatchewan
Niklas Edin	Oskar Eriksson	Rasmus Wranå	Christoffer Sundgren	Karlstad, Sweden
John Epping	Ryan Fry	Mat Camm	Brent Laing	Toronto, Ontario
Brad Gushue	Mark Nichols	Brett Gallant	Geoff Walker	St. John's, Newfoundland and Labrador
Glenn Howard	Scott Howard	David Mathers	Tim March	Penetanguishene, Ontario
Brad Jacobs	Marc Kennedy	E. J. Harnden	Ryan Harnden	Sault Ste. Marie, Ontario
Kevin Koe	B. J. Neufeld	Colton Flasch	Ben Hebert	Calgary, Alberta
Yuta Matsumura	Tetsuro Shimizu	Yasumasa Tanida	Shinya Abe	Sapporo, Japan
Scott McDonald	Jonathan Beuk	Wesley Forget	Scott Chadwick	Kingston, Ontario
Mike McEwen	Reid Carruthers	Derek Samagalski	Colin Hodgson	Winnipeg, Manitoba
Bruce Mouat	Grant Hardie	Bobby Lammie	Hammy McMillan Jr.	Edinburgh, Scotland
Ross Paterson	Kyle Waddell	Duncan Menzies	Michael Goodfellow	Glasgow, Scotland
Yannick Schwaller	Michael Brunner	Romano Meier	Marcel Käufeler	Bern, Switzerland

=== Round-robin standings ===
Final round-robin standings

Key
Teams to Playoffs
Teams to Tiebreakers

Pool A	W	L	PF	PA
(Switzerland) Peter de Cruz	3	1	22	17
(Scotland) Bruce Mouat	3	1	21	18
(Manitoba) Mike McEwen	2	2	19	19
(Ontario) John Epping	1	3	17	19
(Ontario) Glenn Howard	1	3	13	19

Pool B	W	L	PF	PA
(Sweden) Niklas Edin	3	1	22	14
(Ontario) Brad Jacobs	3	1	16	12
(Alberta) Brendan Bottcher	3	1	23	15
(Japan) Yuta Matsumura	1	3	15	22
(Switzerland) Yannick Schwaller	0	4	13	26

Pool C	W	L	PF	PA
(Alberta) Kevin Koe	3	1	22	17
(Newfoundland and Labrador) Brad Gushue	3	1	21	15
(Scotland) Ross Paterson	2	2	21	17
(Saskatchewan) Matt Dunstone	1	3	15	17
(Ontario) Scott McDonald	1	3	12	25

=== Round-robin results ===
All draw times are listed in Newfoundland Time (UTC−03:30).

==== Draw 1 ====
Tuesday, December 10, 7:00 pm

Sheet A	1	2	3	4	5	6	7	8	Final
(Newfoundland and Labrador) Brad Gushue	0	0	0	1	0	2	1	2	6
(Ontario) Scott McDonald 🔨	0	0	1	0	1	0	0	0	2

Sheet B	1	2	3	4	5	6	7	8	9	Final
(Alberta) Kevin Koe 🔨	0	2	0	2	0	0	0	0	2	6
(Saskatchewan) Matt Dunstone	0	0	1	0	1	1	0	1	0	4

==== Draw 2 ====
Wednesday, December 11, 9:00 am

Sheet B	1	2	3	4	5	6	7	8	Final
(Scotland) Bruce Mouat	0	2	1	0	0	2	0	1	6
(Manitoba) Mike McEwen 🔨	1	0	0	1	1	0	1	0	4

Sheet C	1	2	3	4	5	6	7	8	Final
(Switzerland) Yannick Schwaller	0	2	0	0	0	0	1	0	3
(Japan) Yuta Matsumura 🔨	2	0	0	1	0	2	0	1	6

Sheet E	1	2	3	4	5	6	7	8	Final
(Ontario) John Epping	0	1	0	1	1	0	0	X	3
(Switzerland) Peter de Cruz 🔨	2	0	1	0	0	0	5	X	8

==== Draw 3 ====
Wednesday, December 11, 12:30 pm

Sheet B	1	2	3	4	5	6	7	8	Final
(Ontario) Brad Jacobs 🔨	0	2	0	0	1	0	0	X	3
(Alberta) Brendan Bottcher	0	0	1	1	0	2	2	X	6

Sheet C	1	2	3	4	5	6	7	8	Final
(Scotland) Ross Paterson 🔨	1	2	1	0	0	3	X	X	7
(Ontario) Scott McDonald	0	0	0	2	0	0	X	X	2

==== Draw 4 ====
Wednesday, December 11, 4:30 pm

Sheet A	1	2	3	4	5	6	7	8	9	Final
(Sweden) Niklas Edin	0	2	1	0	1	0	1	0	2	7
(Switzerland) Yannick Schwaller 🔨	1	0	0	1	0	1	0	2	0	5

Sheet C	1	2	3	4	5	6	7	8	Final
(Switzerland) Peter de Cruz 🔨	0	0	1	1	0	0	0	2	4
(Ontario) Glenn Howard	1	0	0	0	0	0	2	0	3

==== Draw 5 ====
Wednesday, December 11, 8:30 pm

Sheet A	1	2	3	4	5	6	7	8	Final
(Alberta) Kevin Koe	0	1	0	0	0	X	X	X	1
(Scotland) Ross Paterson 🔨	2	0	0	3	1	X	X	X	6

Sheet D	1	2	3	4	5	6	7	8	Final
(Newfoundland and Labrador) Brad Gushue 🔨	0	0	2	1	0	0	2	X	5
(Saskatchewan) Matt Dunstone	0	0	0	0	1	0	0	X	1

==== Draw 6 ====
Thursday, December 12, 9:00 am

Sheet A	1	2	3	4	5	6	7	8	Final
(Ontario) John Epping 🔨	1	0	4	0	2	X	X	X	7
(Scotland) Bruce Mouat	0	1	0	1	0	X	X	X	2

Sheet B	1	2	3	4	5	6	7	8	Final
(Sweden) Niklas Edin 🔨	0	2	0	3	0	2	0	X	7
(Japan) Yuta Matsumura	0	0	2	0	2	0	0	X	4

Sheet C	1	2	3	4	5	6	7	8	Final
(Ontario) Glenn Howard	0	1	0	1	0	1	0	X	3
(Manitoba) Mike McEwen 🔨	0	0	3	0	2	0	1	X	6

Sheet D	1	2	3	4	5	6	7	8	Final
(Ontario) Brad Jacobs	0	1	1	0	0	2	1	X	5
(Switzerland) Yannick Schwaller 🔨	0	0	0	1	0	0	0	X	1

==== Draw 7 ====
Thursday, December 12, 12:30 pm

Sheet D	1	2	3	4	5	6	7	8	Final
(Alberta) Kevin Koe 🔨	2	0	0	3	0	4	X	X	9
(Ontario) Scott McDonald	0	2	0	0	2	0	X	X	4

==== Draw 8 ====
Thursday, December 12, 4:30 pm

Sheet A	1	2	3	4	5	6	7	8	Final
(Alberta) Brendan Bottcher 🔨	1	0	3	0	3	1	X	X	8
(Japan) Yuta Matsumura	0	1	0	1	0	0	X	X	2

Sheet B	1	2	3	4	5	6	7	8	Final
(Ontario) John Epping 🔨	0	1	0	0	0	0	2	0	3
(Ontario) Glenn Howard	1	0	0	1	0	1	0	1	4

Sheet C	1	2	3	4	5	6	7	8	Final
(Ontario) Brad Jacobs	0	2	0	1	0	0	0	1	4
(Sweden) Niklas Edin 🔨	1	0	1	0	0	0	0	0	2

Sheet E	1	2	3	4	5	6	7	8	9	Final
(Newfoundland and Labrador) Brad Gushue	0	0	2	0	3	0	1	0	1	7
(Scotland) Ross Paterson 🔨	2	2	0	1	0	0	0	1	0	6

==== Draw 9 ====
Thursday, December 12, 8:30 pm

Sheet A	1	2	3	4	5	6	7	8	Final
(Switzerland) Peter de Cruz	1	0	0	2	0	2	0	1	6
(Manitoba) Mike McEwen 🔨	0	1	0	0	2	0	1	0	4

Sheet B	1	2	3	4	5	6	7	8	Final
(Saskatchewan) Matt Dunstone	0	0	0	1	1	0	0	1	3
(Ontario) Scott McDonald 🔨	1	1	0	0	0	1	1	0	4

==== Draw 10 ====
Friday, December 13, 9:00 am

Sheet C	1	2	3	4	5	6	7	8	Final
(Scotland) Bruce Mouat 🔨	0	1	0	0	1	0	3	1	6
(Ontario) Glenn Howard	0	0	0	2	0	1	0	0	3

==== Draw 11 ====
Friday, December 13, 12:30 pm

Sheet A	1	2	3	4	5	6	7	8	Final
(Saskatchewan) Matt Dunstone 🔨	1	0	0	0	2	0	4	X	7
(Scotland) Ross Paterson	0	0	0	1	0	1	0	X	2

Sheet C	1	2	3	4	5	6	7	8	9	Final
(Ontario) John Epping	0	1	0	0	1	1	0	1	0	4
(Manitoba) Mike McEwen 🔨	0	0	0	1	0	0	3	0	1	5

Sheet E	1	2	3	4	5	6	7	8	Final
(Alberta) Brendan Bottcher 🔨	1	0	1	0	1	0	3	2	8
(Switzerland) Yannick Schwaller	0	2	0	1	0	1	0	0	4

==== Draw 12 ====
Friday, December 13, 4:30 pm

Sheet B	1	2	3	4	5	6	7	8	Final
(Scotland) Bruce Mouat 🔨	2	0	1	0	4	0	X	X	7
(Switzerland) Peter de Cruz	0	2	0	1	0	1	X	X	4

==== Draw 13 ====
Friday, December 13, 8:30 pm

Sheet B	1	2	3	4	5	6	7	8	Final
(Ontario) Brad Jacobs 🔨	0	1	0	1	1	0	0	1	4
(Japan) Yuta Matsumura	0	0	1	0	0	2	0	0	3

Sheet C	1	2	3	4	5	6	7	8	Final
(Alberta) Kevin Koe	0	0	2	0	0	0	4	X	6
(Newfoundland and Labrador) Brad Gushue 🔨	0	1	0	2	0	0	0	X	3

Sheet D	1	2	3	4	5	6	7	8	Final
(Alberta) Brendan Bottcher	0	1	0	0	0	0	0	X	1
(Sweden) Niklas Edin 🔨	1	0	1	0	1	2	1	X	6

==== Tiebreakers ====
Saturday, December 14, 9:30 am

Sheet D	1	2	3	4	5	6	7	8	Final
(Scotland) Ross Paterson	0	0	1	0	0	3	0	X	4
(Manitoba) Mike McEwen 🔨	2	2	0	1	1	0	1	X	7

Player percentages
(Scotland) Team Paterson		(Manitoba) Team McEwen	
Michael Goodfellow	96%	Colin Hodgson	91%
Duncan Menzies	87%	Derek Samagalski	88%
Kyle Waddell	82%	Reid Carruthers	89%
Ross Paterson	80%	Mike McEwen	89%
Total	86%	Total	89%

=== Playoffs ===
Quarterfinals
1	(Sweden) Niklas Edin	5
8	(Manitoba) Mike McEwen	2
4	(Alberta) Kevin Koe	2
5	(Scotland) Bruce Mouat	7
2	(Ontario) Brad Jacobs	4
7	(Alberta) Brendan Bottcher	3
3	(Switzerland) Peter de Cruz	5
6	(Newfoundland and Labrador) Brad Gushue	6

Semifinals
1	(Sweden) Niklas Edin	7
5	(Scotland) Bruce Mouat	4
2	(Ontario) Brad Jacobs	5
6	(Newfoundland and Labrador) Brad Gushue	3

Final
1	(Sweden) Niklas Edin	1
2	(Ontario) Brad Jacobs	3

==== Quarterfinals ====
Saturday, December 14, 5:00 pm

Sheet A	1	2	3	4	5	6	7	8	Final
(Alberta) Kevin Koe	0	0	0	0	2	0	0	0	2
(Scotland) Bruce Mouat 🔨	0	0	0	1	0	2	1	3	7

Player percentages
(Alberta) Team Koe		(Scotland) Team Mouat	
Ben Hebert	92%	Hammy McMillan Jr.	93%
Colton Flasch	76%	Bobby Lammie	77%
B. J. Neufeld	77%	Grant Hardie	80%
Kevin Koe	74%	Bruce Mouat	90%
Total	80%	Total	85%

Sheet B	1	2	3	4	5	6	7	8	Final
(Sweden) Niklas Edin 🔨	1	0	0	2	1	1	0	X	5
(Manitoba) Mike McEwen	0	1	0	0	0	0	1	X	2

Player percentages
(Sweden) Team Edin		(Manitoba) Team McEwen	
Christoffer Sundgren	100%	Colin Hodgson	94%
Rasmus Wranå	80%	Derek Samagalski	95%
Oskar Eriksson	98%	Reid Carruthers	75%
Niklas Edin	100%	Mike McEwen	70%
Total	95%	Total	83%

Sheet C	1	2	3	4	5	6	7	8	9	Final
(Ontario) Brad Jacobs	0	1	0	1	0	0	0	1	1	4
(Alberta) Brendan Bottcher 🔨	1	0	1	0	0	1	0	0	0	3

Player percentages
(Ontario) Team Jacobs		(Alberta) Team Bottcher	
Ryan Harnden	92%	Karrick Martin	85%
E. J. Harnden	83%	Brad Thiessen	81%
Marc Kennedy	88%	Darren Moulding	75%
Brad Jacobs	72%	Brendan Bottcher	73%
Total	84%	Total	79%

Sheet D	1	2	3	4	5	6	7	8	Final
(Switzerland) Peter de Cruz 🔨	0	2	0	1	0	2	0	0	5
(Newfoundland and Labrador) Brad Gushue	0	0	2	0	3	0	0	1	6

Player percentages
(Switzerland) Team de Cruz		(Newfoundland and Labrador) Team Gushue	
Valentin Tanner	73%	Geoff Walker	76%
Peter de Cruz	81%	Brett Gallant	65%
Sven Michel	71%	Mark Nichols	91%
Benoît Schwarz	77%	Brad Gushue	93%
Total	76%	Total	81%

==== Semifinals ====
Saturday, December 14, 8:30 pm

Sheet B	1	2	3	4	5	6	7	8	Final
(Ontario) Brad Jacobs	0	3	0	1	0	0	0	1	5
(Newfoundland and Labrador) Brad Gushue 🔨	1	0	1	0	0	1	0	0	3

Player percentages
(Ontario) Team Jacobs		(Newfoundland and Labrador) Team Gushue	
Ryan Harnden	96%	Geoff Walker	100%
E. J. Harnden	100%	Brett Gallant	81%
Marc Kennedy	100%	Mark Nichols	90%
Brad Jacobs	97%	Brad Gushue	87%
Total	99%	Total	90%

Sheet C	1	2	3	4	5	6	7	8	Final
(Sweden) Niklas Edin 🔨	0	1	1	0	1	0	4	X	7
(Scotland) Bruce Mouat	0	0	0	1	0	3	0	X	4

Player percentages
(Sweden) Team Edin		(Scotland) Team Mouat	
Christoffer Sundgren	90%	Hammy McMillan Jr.	96%
Rasmus Wranå	89%	Bobby Lammie	82%
Oskar Eriksson	97%	Grant Hardie	76%
Niklas Edin	89%	Bruce Mouat	77%
Total	91%	Total	83%

==== Final ====
Sunday, December 15, 1:30 pm

Sheet C	1	2	3	4	5	6	7	8	Final
(Sweden) Niklas Edin 🔨	0	0	0	0	0	1	0	X	1
(Ontario) Brad Jacobs	0	0	0	1	1	0	1	X	3

Player percentages
(Sweden) Team Edin		(Ontario) Team Jacobs	
Christoffer Sundgren	89%	Ryan Harnden	90%
Rasmus Wranå	83%	E. J. Harnden	79%
Oskar Eriksson	82%	Marc Kennedy	100%
Niklas Edin	84%	Brad Jacobs	88%
Total	85%	Total	89%

== Women ==
=== Teams ===
The teams are listed as follows:

Skip	Third	Second	Lead	Locale
Chelsea Carey	Sarah Wilkes	Dana Ferguson	Rachelle Brown	Calgary, Alberta
Kerri Einarson	Val Sweeting	Shannon Birchard	Briane Meilleur	Gimli, Manitoba
Tracy Fleury	Selena Njegovan	Liz Fyfe	Kristin MacCuish	East St. Paul, Manitoba
Satsuki Fujisawa	Chinami Yoshida	Yumi Suzuki	– (Note: Team Fujisawa played with three players this week, with their lead Yurika Yoshida falling ill and staying home.)	Kitami, Japan
Anna Hasselborg	Sara McManus	Agnes Knochenhauer	Sofia Mabergs	Sundbyberg, Sweden
Rachel Homan	Emma Miskew	Joanne Courtney	Lisa Weagle	Ottawa, Ontario
Jennifer Jones	Kaitlyn Lawes	Jocelyn Peterman	Laura Walker (Note: Laura Walker replaced Team Jones lead Dawn McEwen, who had fallen ill.)	Winnipeg, Manitoba
Eve Muirhead	Lauren Gray	Jennifer Dodds	Vicky Wright	Stirling, Scotland
Kelsey Rocque	Danielle Schmiemann	Becca Hebert	Jesse Marlow	Edmonton, Alberta
Kristie Moore (Note: Kristie Moore moved up from lead to skip Team Scheidegger, with their skip Casey Scheidegger on maternity leave. Moore's spot was filled by Julie Devereaux from Newfoundland.)	Cary-Anne McTaggart	Jessie Haughian	Julie Devereaux	Lethbridge, Alberta
Robyn Silvernagle	Stefanie Lawton	Jessie Hunkin	Kara Thevenot	North Battleford, Saskatchewan
Briar Hürlimann (Fourth)	Elena Stern (Skip)	Lisa Gisler	Céline Koller	Brig, Switzerland
Alina Pätz (Fourth)	Silvana Tirinzoni (Skip)	Esther Neuenschwander	Melanie Barbezat	Aarau, Switzerland
Isabella Wranå	Jennie Wåhlin	Almida de Val	Fanny Sjöberg	Stockholm, Sweden
Sayaka Yoshimura	Kaho Onodera	Anna Ohmiya	Yumie Funayama	Sapporo, Japan

=== Round-robin standings ===
Final round-robin standings

Key
Teams to Playoffs
Teams to Tiebreakers

Pool A	W	L	PF	PA
(Scotland) Eve Muirhead	3	1	21	20
(Manitoba) Jennifer Jones	2	2	23	21
(Manitoba) Kerri Einarson	2	2	26	20
(Japan) Satsuki Fujisawa	2	2	21	23
(Alberta) Team Scheidegger	1	3	18	25

Pool B	W	L	PF	PA
(Manitoba) Tracy Fleury	4	0	26	19
(Alberta) Chelsea Carey	3	1	21	19
(Switzerland) Silvana Tirinzoni	2	2	23	18
(Sweden) Isabella Wranå	1	3	18	22
(Alberta) Kelsey Rocque	0	4	15	25

Pool C	W	L	PF	PA
(Switzerland) Elena Stern	4	0	22	14
(Sweden) Anna Hasselborg	3	1	19	12
(Saskatchewan) Robyn Silvernagle	2	2	24	19
(Ontario) Rachel Homan	1	3	20	18
(Japan) Sayaka Yoshimura	0	4	7	29

=== Round-robin results ===
All draw times are listed in Newfoundland Time (UTC−03:30).

==== Draw 1 ====
Tuesday, December 10, 7:00 pm

Sheet C	1	2	3	4	5	6	7	8	9	Final
(Manitoba) Kerri Einarson 🔨	3	0	1	0	0	0	2	0	0	6
(Alberta) Team Scheidegger	0	2	0	1	1	1	0	1	2	8

Sheet D	1	2	3	4	5	6	7	8	Final
(Manitoba) Jennifer Jones	0	3	0	2	0	0	0	0	5
(Japan) Satsuki Fujisawa 🔨	1	0	0	0	2	1	1	1	6

Sheet E	1	2	3	4	5	6	7	8	Final
(Switzerland) Silvana Tirinzoni	0	0	0	0	4	0	1	1	6
(Sweden) Isabella Wranå 🔨	0	1	1	1	0	0	0	0	3

==== Draw 2 ====
Wednesday, December 11, 9:00 am

Sheet A	1	2	3	4	5	6	7	8	9	Final
(Saskatchewan) Robyn Silvernagle 🔨	1	0	2	0	0	2	0	1	0	6
(Switzerland) Elena Stern	0	1	0	2	2	0	1	0	1	7

Sheet D	1	2	3	4	5	6	7	8	Final
(Sweden) Anna Hasselborg 🔨	0	2	0	2	0	2	0	X	6
(Japan) Sayaka Yoshimura	0	0	0	0	1	0	1	X	2

==== Draw 3 ====
Wednesday, December 11, 12:30 pm

Sheet A	1	2	3	4	5	6	7	8	Final
(Switzerland) Silvana Tirinzoni 🔨	2	1	1	0	0	1	2	X	7
(Alberta) Kelsey Rocque	0	0	0	1	1	0	0	X	2

Sheet D	1	2	3	4	5	6	7	8	Final
(Manitoba) Tracy Fleury	0	1	0	1	2	0	0	1	5
(Alberta) Chelsea Carey 🔨	0	0	1	0	0	2	1	0	4

Sheet E	1	2	3	4	5	6	7	8	Final
(Scotland) Eve Muirhead 🔨	2	0	0	4	1	0	1	X	8
(Japan) Satsuki Fujisawa	0	2	0	0	0	2	0	X	4

==== Draw 4 ====
Wednesday, December 11, 4:30 pm

Sheet B	1	2	3	4	5	6	7	8	Final
(Japan) Sayaka Yoshimura	0	0	0	0	2	0	0	0	2
(Saskatchewan) Robyn Silvernagle 🔨	0	2	0	0	0	3	0	3	8

Sheet D	1	2	3	4	5	6	7	8	Final
(Ontario) Rachel Homan	0	0	0	1	1	0	1	0	3
(Switzerland) Elena Stern 🔨	0	1	1	0	0	1	0	1	4

Sheet E	1	2	3	4	5	6	7	8	Final
(Manitoba) Kerri Einarson	1	0	3	0	2	0	3	X	9
(Manitoba) Jennifer Jones 🔨	0	2	0	1	0	1	0	X	4

==== Draw 5 ====
Wednesday, December 11, 8:30 pm

Sheet B	1	2	3	4	5	6	7	8	Final
(Scotland) Eve Muirhead	0	1	1	0	2	0	0	1	5
(Alberta) Team Scheidegger 🔨	0	0	0	1	0	1	1	0	3

Sheet C	1	2	3	4	5	6	7	8	Final
(Manitoba) Tracy Fleury 🔨	0	2	0	2	0	2	0	1	7
(Sweden) Isabella Wranå	2	0	2	0	2	0	0	0	6

==== Draw 6 ====
Thursday, December 12, 9:00 am

Sheet E	1	2	3	4	5	6	7	8	Final
(Sweden) Anna Hasselborg	0	0	2	0	0	1	0	0	3
(Switzerland) Elena Stern 🔨	0	2	0	0	0	0	2	1	5

==== Draw 7 ====
Thursday, December 12, 12:30 pm

Sheet A	1	2	3	4	5	6	7	8	Final
(Japan) Satsuki Fujisawa	1	1	0	2	0	3	2	X	9
(Alberta) Team Scheidegger 🔨	0	0	2	0	1	0	0	X	3

Sheet B	1	2	3	4	5	6	7	8	Final
(Alberta) Kelsey Rocque	0	0	0	3	0	1	0	0	4
(Sweden) Isabella Wranå 🔨	0	2	0	0	2	0	0	1	5

Sheet C	1	2	3	4	5	6	7	8	Final
(Switzerland) Silvana Tirinzoni 🔨	1	0	0	3	0	1	0	0	5
(Alberta) Chelsea Carey	0	1	0	0	3	0	1	1	6

Sheet E	1	2	3	4	5	6	7	8	Final
(Ontario) Rachel Homan 🔨	0	1	4	4	0	X	X	X	9
(Japan) Sayaka Yoshimura	0	0	0	0	1	X	X	X	1

==== Draw 8 ====
Thursday, December 12, 4:30 pm

Sheet D	1	2	3	4	5	6	7	8	9	Final
(Sweden) Anna Hasselborg	0	2	0	0	0	1	0	0	1	4
(Saskatchewan) Robyn Silvernagle 🔨	0	0	0	0	1	0	1	1	0	3

==== Draw 9 ====
Thursday, December 12, 8:30 pm

Sheet C	1	2	3	4	5	6	7	8	Final
(Manitoba) Jennifer Jones 🔨	1	1	0	4	1	2	X	X	9
(Scotland) Eve Muirhead	0	0	2	0	0	0	X	X	2

Sheet D	1	2	3	4	5	6	7	8	Final
(Manitoba) Kerri Einarson 🔨	0	1	0	1	2	1	2	X	7
(Japan) Satsuki Fujisawa	1	0	1	0	0	0	0	X	2

Sheet E	1	2	3	4	5	6	7	8	Final
(Manitoba) Tracy Fleury 🔨	2	0	1	0	1	0	2	1	7
(Alberta) Kelsey Rocque	0	1	0	1	0	2	0	0	4

==== Draw 10 ====
Friday, December 13, 9:00 am

Sheet B	1	2	3	4	5	6	7	8	Final
(Ontario) Rachel Homan 🔨	0	2	0	2	0	2	0	0	6
(Saskatchewan) Robyn Silvernagle	0	0	4	0	2	0	0	1	7

Sheet D	1	2	3	4	5	6	7	8	9	Final
(Alberta) Chelsea Carey 🔨	0	0	0	1	0	0	3	0	1	5
(Sweden) Isabella Wranå	0	1	0	0	0	2	0	1	0	4

==== Draw 11 ====
Friday, December 13, 12:30 pm

Sheet B	1	2	3	4	5	6	7	8	Final
(Manitoba) Kerri Einarson	0	1	0	1	2	0	0	0	4
(Scotland) Eve Muirhead 🔨	0	0	2	0	0	2	1	1	6

Sheet D	1	2	3	4	5	6	7	8	Final
(Switzerland) Silvana Tirinzoni 🔨	1	0	2	0	0	2	0	0	5
(Manitoba) Tracy Fleury	0	1	0	2	1	0	2	1	7

==== Draw 12 ====
Friday, December 13, 4:30 pm

Sheet A	1	2	3	4	5	6	7	8	Final
(Alberta) Chelsea Carey 🔨	1	2	0	1	0	0	0	2	6
(Alberta) Kelsey Rocque	0	0	3	0	2	0	0	0	5

Sheet C	1	2	3	4	5	6	7	8	Final
(Sweden) Anna Hasselborg 🔨	0	2	0	2	1	0	1	X	6
(Ontario) Rachel Homan	0	0	1	0	0	1	0	X	2

Sheet D	1	2	3	4	5	6	7	8	Final
(Manitoba) Jennifer Jones	1	2	0	0	1	0	0	1	5
(Alberta) Team Scheidegger 🔨	0	0	2	0	0	2	0	0	4

Sheet E	1	2	3	4	5	6	7	8	Final
(Japan) Sayaka Yoshimura 🔨	0	0	1	0	1	0	0	0	2
(Switzerland) Elena Stern	0	0	0	1	0	2	1	2	6

==== Tiebreakers ====
Friday, December 13, 8:30 pm

Sheet A	1	2	3	4	5	6	7	8	Final
(Saskatchewan) Robyn Silvernagle	0	1	1	0	2	0	1	4	9
(Switzerland) Silvana Tirinzoni 🔨	1	0	0	1	0	1	0	0	3

Player percentages
(Saskatchewan) Team Silvernagle		(Switzerland) Team Tirinzoni	
Kara Thevenot	90%	Melanie Barbezat	75%
Jessie Hunkin	88%	Esther Neuenschwander	73%
Stefanie Lawton	97%	Silvana Tirinzoni	68%
Robyn Silvernagle	84%	Alina Pätz	66%
Total	90%	Total	71%

Sheet E	1	2	3	4	5	6	7	8	Final
(Manitoba) Kerri Einarson	0	0	1	0	1	0	0	0	2
(Japan) Satsuki Fujisawa 🔨	0	0	0	1	0	0	1	1	3

Player percentages
(Manitoba) Team Einarson		(Japan) Team Fujisawa	
Briane Meilleur	86%	Yumi Suzuki	78%
Shannon Birchard	91%	Yumi Suzuki / Chinami Yoshida	69%
Val Sweeting	70%	Chinami Yoshida	76%
Kerri Einarson	72%	Satsuki Fujisawa	90%
Total	80%	Total	78%

=== Playoffs ===
Quarterfinals
1	(Switzerland) Elena Stern	3
8	(Japan) Satsuki Fujisawa	9
4	(Alberta) Chelsea Carey	2
5	(Sweden) Anna Hasselborg	9
2	(Manitoba) Tracy Fleury	6
7	(Saskatchewan) Robyn Silvernagle	3
3	(Scotland) Eve Muirhead	5
6	(Manitoba) Jennifer Jones	7

Semifinals
8	(Japan) Satsuki Fujisawa	4
5	(Sweden) Anna Hasselborg	5
2	(Manitoba) Tracy Fleury	9
6	(Manitoba) Jennifer Jones	10

Final
5	(Sweden) Anna Hasselborg	7
6	(Manitoba) Jennifer Jones	3

==== Quarterfinals ====
Saturday, December 14, 1:30 pm

Sheet A	1	2	3	4	5	6	7	8	Final
(Switzerland) Elena Stern 🔨	1	0	0	0	0	2	X	X	3
(Japan) Satsuki Fujisawa	0	0	3	3	3	0	X	X	9

Player percentages
(Switzerland) Team Stern		(Japan) Team Fujisawa	
Céline Koller	77%	Yumi Suzuki	95%
Lisa Gisler	75%	Yumi Suzuki / Chinami Yoshida	81%
Elena Stern	62%	Chinami Yoshida	86%
Briar Hürlimann	42%	Satsuki Fujisawa	85%
Total	64%	Total	87%

Sheet B	1	2	3	4	5	6	7	8	Final
(Alberta) Chelsea Carey 🔨	0	2	0	0	0	0	X	X	2
(Sweden) Anna Hasselborg	0	0	3	2	1	3	X	X	9

Player percentages
(Alberta) Team Carey		(Sweden) Team Hasselborg	
Rachelle Brown	88%	Sofia Mabergs	97%
Dana Ferguson	97%	Agnes Knochenhauer	99%
Sarah Wilkes	70%	Sara McManus	91%
Chelsea Carey	45%	Anna Hasselborg	92%
Total	76%	Total	95%

Sheet C	1	2	3	4	5	6	7	8	Final
(Scotland) Eve Muirhead 🔨	2	0	0	2	0	0	0	1	5
(Manitoba) Jennifer Jones	0	2	1	0	0	2	2	0	7

Player percentages
(Scotland) Team Muirhead		(Manitoba) Team Jones	
Vicky Wright	83%	Laura Walker	81%
Jennifer Dodds	88%	Jocelyn Peterman	75%
Lauren Gray	95%	Kaitlyn Lawes	62%
Eve Muirhead	58%	Jennifer Jones	83%
Total	81%	Total	75%

Sheet D	1	2	3	4	5	6	7	8	Final
(Manitoba) Tracy Fleury 🔨	0	2	0	0	2	2	0	X	6
(Saskatchewan) Robyn Silvernagle	0	0	1	0	0	0	2	X	3

Player percentages
(Manitoba) Team Fleury		(Saskatchewan) Team Silvernagle	
Kristin MacCuish	80%	Kara Thevenot	75%
Liz Fyfe	73%	Jessie Hunkin	73%
Selena Njegovan	82%	Stefanie Lawton	67%
Tracy Fleury	90%	Robyn Silvernagle	69%
Total	81%	Total	71%

==== Semifinals ====
Saturday, December 14, 8:30 pm

Sheet A	1	2	3	4	5	6	7	8	9	Final
(Manitoba) Tracy Fleury 🔨	2	0	1	0	3	0	0	3	0	9
(Manitoba) Jennifer Jones	0	3	0	2	0	2	2	0	1	10

Player percentages
(Manitoba) Team Fleury		(Manitoba) Team Jones	
Kristin MacCuish	93%	Laura Walker	85%
Liz Fyfe	80%	Jocelyn Peterman	80%
Selena Njegovan	74%	Kaitlyn Lawes	87%
Tracy Fleury	74%	Jennifer Jones	80%
Total	80%	Total	83%

Sheet D	1	2	3	4	5	6	7	8	9	Final
(Japan) Satsuki Fujisawa	0	0	0	3	0	0	0	1	0	4
(Sweden) Anna Hasselborg 🔨	0	0	1	0	1	1	1	0	1	5

Player percentages
(Japan) Team Fujisawa		(Sweden) Team Hasselborg	
Yumi Suzuki	80%	Sofia Mabergs	85%
Yumi Suzuki / Chinami Yoshida	66%	Agnes Knochenhauer	93%
Chinami Yoshida	88%	Sara McManus	94%
Satsuki Fujisawa	77%	Anna Hasselborg	80%
Total	78%	Total	88%

==== Final ====
Sunday, December 15, 5:30 pm

Sheet C	1	2	3	4	5	6	7	8	Final
(Sweden) Anna Hasselborg 🔨	2	0	0	4	0	0	1	X	7
(Manitoba) Jennifer Jones	0	0	1	0	0	2	0	X	3

Player percentages
(Sweden) Team Hasselborg		(Manitoba) Team Jones	
Sofia Mabergs	88%	Laura Walker	83%
Agnes Knochenhauer	86%	Jocelyn Peterman	68%
Sara McManus	87%	Kaitlyn Lawes	68%
Anna Hasselborg	95%	Jennifer Jones	75%
Total	89%	Total	74%
