= Fanny Sjöberg =

Swedish curler

- Curler
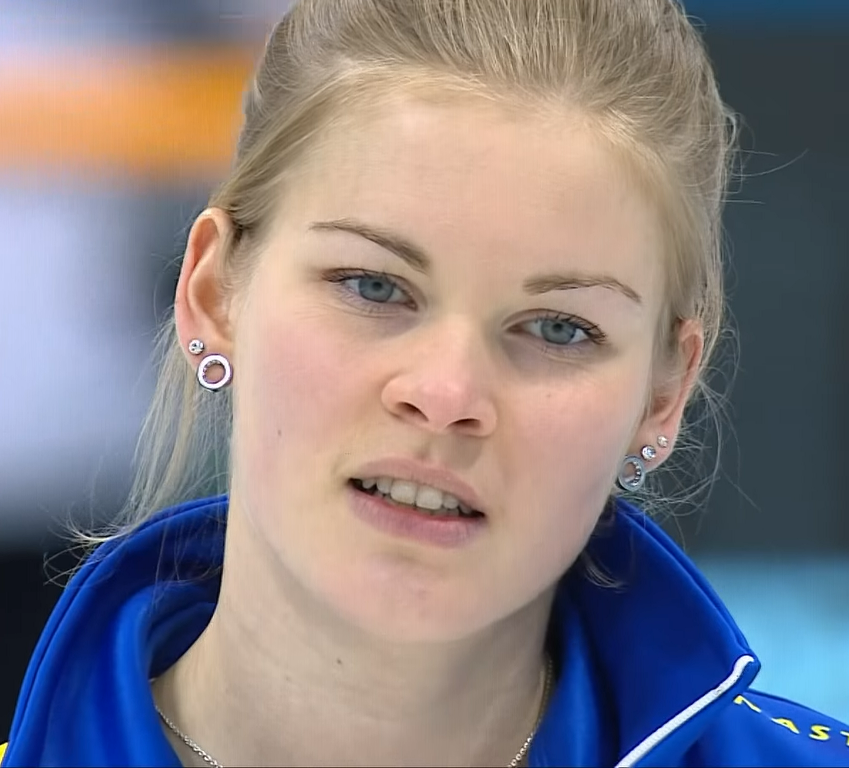
- Sjöberg at the 2019 Winter Universiade
- Born: 5 November 1997 (age 29); Sweden

Team
- Curling club: Sundbybergs CK, Sundbyberg, Sweden
- Mixed doubles partner: Axel Sjöberg

Curling career
- Member Association: Sweden
- World Mixed Championship: 1 (2023)
Medal record
Women's curling
Representing Sweden
World Junior Curling Championships
Gold medal – first place	2017 Gangneung
Silver medal – second place	2018 Aberdeen
Winter Universiade
Gold medal – first place	2019 Krasnoyarsk
Bronze medal – third place	2017 Almaty
World Mixed Championship
Gold medal – first place	2023 Aberdeen
Swedish Women's Championship
Gold medal – first place	2018 Skellefteå
Silver medal – second place	2016 Piteå
Silver medal – second place	2019 Jönköping
Bronze medal – third place	2020 Jönköping

Fanny Birgitta Josefin Sjöberg (born 5 November 1997) is a Swedish curler from Stockholm. She played lead on Team Isabella Wranå from 2007 to 2021, at which point she decided to step back from competitive curling.

== Career ==
=== Juniors ===
Sjöberg played in the World Junior Curling Championships in 2014, 2015, 2017 and 2018 as a member of Team Isabella Wranå. In 2014, her team of Isabella Wranå, Jennie Wåhlin, Elin Lövstrand and Almida de Val had a fourth-place finish, after they lost in the bronze medal game to Russia. In 2015, she and teammates Wranå, Wåhlin, Johanna Heldin and Johanna Höglund again finished fourth after this time losing to Switzerland in the bronze medal game. She was back at the event in 2017 where her team won the gold medal, defeating Scotland's Sophie Jackson in the final, and lost just two round robin games in the process. The next year the same team went undefeated in the round robin, but ended up losing to Canada's Kaitlyn Jones in the final. This team also represented Sweden at the 2017 Winter Universiade, where they took home the bronze medal. Sjöberg represented Sweden one more time at the juniors in 2019 as alternate for Tova Sundberg. They placed sixth.

=== Women's ===
As World Junior champions, the Wranå rink qualified for the 2017 Humpty's Champions Cup, Sjöberg's first Grand Slam event. The team did not qualify for the playoffs but did win one game. The team won their first World Curling Tour event at the 2018 AMJ Campbell Shorty Jenkins Classic. A month later, they won the Paf Masters Tour. Over the course of the 2018–19 season, the team played in four slams, failing to qualify in any of the four. They won one game at the 2018 Tour Challenge, one game at the 2018 National, no games at the 2019 Canadian Open and one game at the 2019 Champions Cup. Also during this season, the team won the 2019 Winter Universiade.

Team Wranå had a successful 2019–20 season, winning two tour events (the Royal LePage Women's Fall Classic and the Paf Masters Tour once again) and finishing second at the Women's Masters Basel and the Glynhill Ladies International. They played in two slam events, winning one game at both the 2019 Tour Challenge and the 2019 National.

Due to the COVID-19 pandemic, Team Wranå only played in one tour event during the abbreviated 2020–21 season. The team competed at the 2020 Women's Masters Basel, where they missed the playoffs with a 1–2 record. In December, they played Team Hasselborg in the Sweden National Challenge, where they won by a score of 17–12. The Swedish Women's Curling Championship was cancelled due to the pandemic, so Team Hasselborg was named as the Swedish Team for the 2021 World Women's Curling Championship. After the season, Sjöberg decided to step back from competitive curling.

=== Mixed ===
In 2023, Sjöberg represented Sweden at the 2023 World Mixed Curling Championship. She played lead on the team led by Johan Nygren with longtime teammate Jennie Wåhlin at third and Fredrik Carlsén at second. The team dominated the round robin, finishing as the first seeds with an 8–0 record. They then beat Belgium in the quarterfinals and Canada in the semifinals, qualifying for the final. There, they downed Spain's Sergio Vez 8–2 to claim Sweden's first World Mixed title.

== Personal life ==
Her older brother Axel Sjöberg is her mixed doubles partner. Her father is Bernt Sjöberg, a wheelchair curler who is 2006 Winter Paralympics bronze medallist.

== Grand Slam record ==
Key
C	Champion
F	Lost in Final
SF	Lost in Semifinal
QF	Lost in Quarterfinals
R16	Lost in the round of 16
Q	Did not advance to playoffs
T2	Played in Tier 2 event
DNP	Did not participate in event
N/A	Not a Grand Slam event that season

Event	2016–17	2017–18	2018–19	2019–20
Masters	DNP	DNP	DNP	DNP
Tour Challenge	DNP	DNP	Q	Q
The National	DNP	DNP	Q	Q
Canadian Open	DNP	DNP	Q	DNP
Players'	DNP	DNP	DNP	N/A
Champions Cup	Q	DNP	Q	N/A

== Teams ==
Season	Skip	Third	Second	Lead
2012–13	Isabella Wranå	Jennie Wåhlin	Elin Lövstrand	Fanny Sjöberg
2013–14	Isabella Wranå	Jennie Wåhlin	Elin Lövstrand	Fanny Sjöberg
2014–15	Isabella Wranå	Jennie Wåhlin	Elin Lövstrand	Fanny Sjöberg
2015–16	Isabella Wranå	Jennie Wåhlin	Johanna Hoeglund	Fanny Sjöberg
2016–17	Isabella Wranå	Jennie Wåhlin	Almida de Val	Fanny Sjöberg
2017–18	Isabella Wranå	Jennie Wåhlin	Almida de Val	Fanny Sjöberg
2018–19	Isabella Wranå	Jennie Wåhlin	Almida de Val	Fanny Sjöberg
2019–20	Isabella Wranå	Jennie Wåhlin	Almida de Val	Fanny Sjöberg
2020–21	Isabella Wranå	Jennie Wåhlin	Almida de Val	Fanny Sjöberg
