= Sayaka Yoshimura =

Japanese curler (born 1992)

- Curler
- Born: January 30, 1992 (age 34); Kitami, Hokkaido

Team
- Curling club: Sapporo CC, Sapporo

Curling career
- Member Association: Japan
- World Championship: 3 (2015, 2021, 2025)
- Pacific-Asia Championship: 2 (2014, 2021)
- Olympic: 1 (2026)
Medal record
Women's curling
Representing Japan
Pacific-Asia Championships
| Gold medal – first place | 2021 Almaty |
| Bronze medal – third place | 2014 Kariuzawa |
World Junior Championships
| Bronze medal – third place | 2013 Sochi |
Pacific-Asia Junior Championships
| Gold medal – first place | 2011 Naseby |
| Gold medal – first place | 2012 Jeonju City |
| Gold medal – first place | 2013 Tokoro |
| Silver medal – second place | 2006 Beijing |
Representing Hokkaido
Japan Curling Championships
| Gold medal – first place | 2015 Tokoro |
| Gold medal – first place | 2021 Wakkanai |
| Gold medal – first place | 2025 Yokohama |
| Silver medal – second place | 2010 Tokoro |
| Silver medal – second place | 2018 Nayoro |
| Bronze medal – third place | 2008 Karuizawa |
| Bronze medal – third place | 2013 Sapporo |
| Bronze medal – third place | 2016 Aomori |
| Bronze medal – third place | 2019 Sapporo |
| Bronze medal – third place | 2020 Karuizawa |
| Bronze medal – third place | 2026 Yokohama |

Sayaka Yoshimura (吉村 紗也香, Yoshimura Sayaka; born January 30, 1992 in Kitami) is a retired Japanese curler from Sapporo, Hokkaido. She was the skip of the FORTIUS curling team from 2018 to 2026 and won the Japan Curling Championships in 2015, 2021 and 2025. At the international level, she has represented Japan three times at the World Women's Curling Championship (2015, 2021, 2025) and two Pacific-Asia Curling Championships in 2014 and 2021, winning the gold medal in 2021.

== Career ==
=== Juniors ===
Yoshimura made her international debut for Japan at the 2006 Pacific Junior Curling Championships, playing lead for Team Japan, skipped by Megumi Kobayashi. They would win a silver medal after losing in the final to China's Wang Bingyu. In 2009, her junior team competed in the qualification round for the 2010 Winter Olympics, but lost in the first round to Team Nagano. Yoshimura did not return to the Pacific Juniors until 2011, when she skipped Japan to a gold medal at the 2011 Pacific Junior Curling Championships, qualifying her nation for the 2011 World Junior Curling Championships. There, she led Japan to a 3–6 record, finishing in eighth place. Also during the 2010–11 season, she skipped Japan at the 2011 Winter Universiade. There, she led her team to a 6–3 round robin record, qualifying for the playoffs. They then lost both of their playoff games, settling for fourth.

Yoshimura once again led Japan to a gold medal at the 2012 Pacific-Asia Junior Curling Championships. After a 6–2 record in the round robin, her team beat South Korea's Kim Eun-jung 3–2 in the championship final. This win qualified her team for the 2012 World Junior Curling Championships where they lost in a tiebreaker to Sweden's Sara McManus. She won another gold medal for Japan at the 2013 Pacific-Asia Junior Curling Championships, losing only one game en route to claiming the title. She would then finally make the podium at the World Juniors, leading Japan to bronze medal at the 2013 World Junior Curling Championships. After the round robin, her team of Rina Ida, Risa Ujihara and Mao Ishigaki were in second place with a 6–3 record. However, they lost both the 1 vs. 2 page playoff and semifinal games before beating Czech Republic's Zuzana Hájková in the bronze medal game. Also that season, they reached the semifinals of the Karuizawa International.

Team Yoshimura also represented Japan at the 2013 Winter Universiade. There, they started with wins in three of their first four games before losing their last five games, finishing in a disappointing seventh place. Team Yoshimura also qualified to compete in the national trials for the chance to represent Japan at the 2014 Winter Olympics. At the Trials, they finished with a 2–4 record, however, were able to beat the eventual champions Hokkaido Bank (Ayumi Ogasawara) in their opening match. On tour, they finished runner-up at the 2013 Medicine Hat Charity Classic to Russia's Anna Sidorova rink.

=== Women's ===
==== 2014–2018: Team Ogasawara ====
After the season, Yoshimura joined the Ogasawara Hokkaido Bank rink at third, who were the top ranked team in Japan at the time. The team also included Kaho Onodera at second, Anna Ohmiya at lead and Yumie Funayama as the alternate. On the World Curling Tour, they would win two events, the Prestige Hotels & Resorts Curling Classic and the Hub International Crown of Curling. They represented Japan at the 2014 Pacific-Asia Curling Championships, Yoshimura's first appearance at the championship. After a 5–3 round robin record, they lost to China's Liu Sijia in the semifinal. They were, however, able to pick up the bronze medal against New Zealand's Chelsea Farley. This would ordinarily not be enough to qualify Japan for the World Championships, but because Sapporo was hosting the event, Japan qualified for the 2015 World Women's Curling Championship. The team then competed in their national championship to determine who would represent Japan at the World Championship. After the round robin, they placed second with a 7–1 record, but defeated Loco Solare (Mari Motohashi) to qualify for the final where they once again played Motohashi. The team were successful in securing the national title by defeating Loco Solare 8–5 and qualifying for the World Championship, Yoshimura's first Worlds. There, they placed just outside of the tiebreakers with a 6–5 record, ending in sixth place.

Team Ogasawara won one tour event during the 2015–16 season, the Karuizawa International, where they lost only one game en route to claiming the title. They also had semifinal appearances at the Colonial Square Ladies Classic, the Crestwood Ladies Fall Classic and the City of Perth Ladies International. The team played in the 2016 Continental Cup of Curling where they were part of the losing Team World squad. In February 2016, they competed in the Japan Curling Championships, attempting to defend their title. They had a strong round robin, going an undefeated 8–0, but then lost both of their playoff games to Loco Solare (Satsuki Fujisawa) and Fujikyu (Tori Koana), settling for third. They also played in the 2016 Humpty's Champions Cup, the team's first Grand Slam event. They would finish the round robin as the number one seed with a 4–0 record before losing in the quarterfinals to Switzerland's Silvana Tirinzoni.

The team altered their lineup for the 2016–17 season, moving Yoshimura to alternate and Yumie Funayama to third. At the start of the season, Team Ogasawara finished runner-up at the Royal LePage Women's Fall Classic to the Robyn MacPhee rink. They played in one grand slam, the 2016 Tour Challenge, losing in a tiebreaker to Anna Hasselborg. At the national championship, they went 6–2 through the round robin before losing both the semifinal and bronze medal games, settling for fourth. The next season was more successful for the team, reaching the semifinals in five of their eleven tour events. They were not able to make it further than the semifinals in any of their events, however. They did not have the opportunity to compete to represent Japan at the 2018 Winter Olympics as only the Fujisawa and Chiaki Matsumura rinks were selected to compete in the 2017 Japanese Olympic Curling Trials. At the 2018 Japan Curling Championships, they went 7–1 through the round robin and once again won the 1 vs. 2 page playoff game to qualify for the final. There, they faced Koana's Fujikyu rink. Tied 3–3 with the hammer in the tenth end, Ogasawara missed her last shot and the team gave up a steal of two and the win to the Koana rink. Following the season, Ogasawara stepped away from competitive curling.

==== 2018–2025: Team Yoshimura ====
Following Ogasawara's retirement, for the 2018–19 season, Yoshimura stepped up to skip the team with Onodera at third, Ohmiya at second, and Funayama playing lead. The team would have immediate success on the tour, winning the 2018 Oakville Fall Classic. The team played in three Slams over the course of the season, the 2018 Tour Challenge Tier 2, the 2018 National and 2019 Players' Championship. Despite missing the playoffs at the National and Players' Championship, the team made it all the way to the final of the Tour Challenge Tier 2 where they were defeated by the Elena Stern rink. They also had three runner-up finishes at the Colonial Square Ladies Classic, the 2018 Paf Masters Tour and the Karuizawa International. At the 2019 Japan Curling Championships, Yoshimura led her team to a fourth place 5–3 record in the round robin. They were then able to defeat Fujikyu in the 3 vs. 4 game but were eliminated by Loco Solare in the semifinal, earning the bronze medal.

Team Yoshimura had a slow start to the 2019–20 season, only qualifying for the playoffs in three of their first eight events. They reached the semifinals of the 2019 Cargill Curling Training Centre Icebreaker and the quarterfinals of both the 2019 AMJ Campbell Shorty Jenkins Classic and the KW Fall Classic. They would find success at the first Grand Slam event of the season, however, reaching the playoffs of the 2019 Masters with a 3–1 record. They would then upset higher ranked teams Jennifer Jones and Silvana Tirinzoni before losing to Tracy Fleury in the final. It marked the first time an Asian team made it to a grand slam final, excluding defunct events. The team would not qualify in any of the three other Slams they participated in during the season, the 2019 Tour Challenge, the 2019 National or the 2020 Canadian Open. They once again finished third at the 2020 Japan Curling Championships after a semifinal loss to Chubu Electric Power (Seina Nakajima). The Japanese championship would be their last event of the season as both the Players' Championship and the Champions Cup Grand Slam events were also cancelled due to the pandemic.

Team Yoshimura played in no World Curling Tour events during the abbreviated 2020–21 season as there were no events held in Japan or Asia. The team would compete in the 2021 Japan Curling Championships, held from February 8 to 14, 2021 in Wakkanai, Hokkaido. The team posted a 5–1 record through the round robin of the national championship, earning them a spot in the 1 vs. 2 page playoff game. There, the lost to Loco Solare, but beat Chubu Electric Power in the semifinal to qualify for the final. Down one in the tenth, Team Yoshimura scored two points to win the national championship 7–6 over Team Fujisawa. The win marked the team's second time winning the national title in over six years. It also earned them the right to represent Japan at the 2021 World Women's Curling Championship, which was played in a bio-secure bubble in Calgary, Canada due the ongoing pandemic. At the Worlds, Yoshimura led her team to a 5–8 record, finishing in eleventh place.

In September 2021, the team competed in the 2021 Japanese Olympic Curling Trials, which were held in a best-of-five contest between the Yoshimura and Satsuki Fujisawa rinks. After winning the first two games, Team Yoshimura lost the final three games of the trials, not earning the right to represent Japan at the 2021 Olympic Qualification Event. They played in one Slam at the 2021 Masters where they went a winless 0–3 in the triple knockout bracket. They were, however, still able to represent Japan at the 2021 Pacific-Asia Curling Championships due to winning the 2021 national championship. There, they went 5–1 through the round robin, earning a direct bye to the final where they faced South Korea's Kim Eun-jung. Down one in the tenth, Team Yoshimura was once again able to score a deuce to win the game 6–5 and earn the gold medal. Because Team Fujisawa won the Olympic Trials series and were representing Japan at the 2022 Winter Olympics, a world championship trial was held between Hokkaido Bank Fortius, Chubu Electric Power and Fujikyu to determine who would represent Japan at the 2022 World Women's Curling Championship. Hokkaido Bank posted a 3–1 record in the qualifying round, earning them a spot in the best-of-three final against Nakajima. After splitting the first two games, the Nakajima rink took one in the tenth end of the final game to earn the berth as Team Japan at the World Championship. In December, the team added Mina Kobayashi as their alternate. Team Yoshimura ended their season at the 2022 Japan Curling Championships. After a 4–4 round robin record, they lost in the 3 vs. 4 page playoff game to Chubu Electric Power. Also during the 2021–22 season, the team's contract expired with Hokkaido Bank. They then formed their own team named Fortius.

In their first event of the 2022–23 season, Team Yoshimura won the 2022 Hokkaido Bank Curling Classic. They then won the Wakkanai Midori Challenge Cup two weeks later. In their next two events, they again reached the finals, losing the Argo Graphics Cup final to Sae Yamamoto and the ADVICS Cup final to Team Fujisawa. After a successful start to the season, Yuna Kotani was added at the third position in September 2022. The revised lineup of the team was Yoshimura at skip, Kotani at third, Onodera at second, Ohmiya at lead and Kobayashi as alternate with Yumie Funayama becoming the team's coach. In Canada, the team had back-to-back quarterfinal appearances at the S3 Group Curling Stadium Series and the 2022 Western Showdown, losing out to Stefania Constantini and Meghan Walter respectively. In December, Team Yoshimura competed in the 2022 Karuizawa International Curling Championships where they finished third, beating Loco Solare in the bronze medal game. In the New Year, the team played in the 2023 New Year Medalist Curling where they lost in the semifinals to Daniela Jentsch. It would be the team's last event of the 2022–23 season as positive cases of COVID-19 within the team forced them to withdraw from their qualifying round of the 2023 Japan Curling Championships.

Team Yoshimura would return for the 2024–25 season, where they would find success on tour, finishing in the quarterfinals at the 2024 National and the 2025 Players' Championship Grand Slam events. During the season, Yoshimura would win their next national title at the 2025 Japan Curling Championships, beating Miku Nihira 8–7 in the final. This win qualified them to represent Japan at the 2025 World Women's Curling Championship. At the World's however, the team would struggle, finishing 9th with a 4–8 record after round robin play.

==== 2025–present: Yoshimura's first Olympics ====
Team Yoshimura would begin the 2025–26 season strong, winning the 2025 Hokkaido Bank Curling Classic, beating Momoha Tabata 6–3 in the final. They would continue their winning streak at the 2025 Japanese Olympic curling trials, beating Miyu Ueno 3–2 in a best-of-five final, and qualifying to represent Japan at the 2025 Olympic Qualification Event. At the Qualification event, the team would go 6–1 in the round robin and win 6–5 over Norway's Marianne Rørvik to win the event and qualify for the 2026 Winter Olympics, Yoshimura's first Olympic Games.

== Personal life ==
Yoshimura attended Tokoro High School and Sapporo International University. She is married and is employed as an office worker.

== Grand Slam record ==
Yoshimura set a record at the 2019 Masters, being the first women's team from Asia to make a Grand Slam final, excluding inactive events.

Key
| C | Champion |
| F | Lost in Final |
| SF | Lost in Semifinal |
| QF | Lost in Quarterfinals |
| R16 | Lost in the round of 16 |
| Q | Did not advance to playoffs |
| T2 | Played in Tier 2 event |
| DNP | Did not participate in event |
| N/A | Not a Grand Slam event that season |

| Event | 2015–16 | 2016–17 | 2017–18 | 2018–19 | 2019–20 | 2020–21 | 2021–22 | 2022–23 | 2023–24 | 2024–25 | 2025–26 |
|---|---|---|---|---|---|---|---|---|---|---|---|
| Masters | DNP | DNP | DNP | DNP | F | N/A | Q | DNP | DNP | DNP | Q |
| Tour Challenge | DNP | DNP | DNP | T2 | Q | N/A | N/A | DNP | DNP | T2 | Q |
| The National | DNP | DNP | DNP | Q | Q | N/A | DNP | DNP | DNP | QF | QF |
| Canadian Open | DNP | DNP | DNP | DNP | Q | N/A | N/A | DNP | DNP | Q | SF |
| Players' | DNP | DNP | DNP | Q | N/A | DNP | DNP | DNP | DNP | QF | Q |
| Champions Cup | QF | DNP | DNP | DNP | N/A | DNP | DNP | DNP | N/A | N/A | N/A |

=== Former events ===
| Event | 2014–15 |
|---|---|
| Autumn Gold | Q |

== Teams ==
| Season | Skip | Third | Second | Lead | Alternate |
|---|---|---|---|---|---|
| 2005–06 | Megumi Kobayashi | Natsuki Yoshida | Rina Ida | Sayaka Yoshimura | |
| 2009–10 | Sayaka Yoshimura | Rina Ida | Risa Ujihara | Mao Ishigaki | Kaho Onodera |
| 2010–11 | Sayaka Yoshimura | Rina Ida | Risa Ujihara | Mao Ishigaki | Midori Hachimaru / Nanami Ohmiya |
| 2011–12 | Sayaka Yoshimura | Rina Ida | Risa Ujihara | Mao Ishigaki | Natsuko Ishiyama |
| 2012–13 | Sayaka Yoshimura | Rina Ida | Risa Ujihara | Mao Ishigaki | Natsuko Ishiyama |
| 2013–14 | Sayaka Yoshimura | Rina Ida | Risa Ujihara | Mao Ishigaki | Natsuko Ishiyama |
| 2014–15 | Ayumi Ogasawara | Sayaka Yoshimura | Kaho Onodera | Anna Ohmiya | Yumie Funayama |
| 2015–16 | Ayumi Ogasawara | Sayaka Yoshimura | Kaho Onodera | Anna Ohmiya | |
| 2016–17 | Ayumi Ogasawara | Yumie Funayama | Kaho Onodera | Anna Ohmiya | Sayaka Yoshimura |
| 2017–18 | Ayumi Ogasawara | Yumie Funayama | Kaho Onodera | Anna Ohmiya | Sayaka Yoshimura |
| 2018–19 | Sayaka Yoshimura | Kaho Onodera | Anna Ohmiya | Yumie Funayama | |
| 2019–20 | Sayaka Yoshimura | Kaho Onodera | Anna Ohmiya | Yumie Funayama | |
| 2020–21 | Sayaka Yoshimura | Kaho Onodera | Anna Ohmiya | Yumie Funayama | Ayami Ito |
| 2021–22 | Sayaka Yoshimura | Kaho Onodera | Anna Ohmiya | Yumie Funayama | Momoha Tabata / Mina Kobayashi |
| 2022–23 | Sayaka Yoshimura | Kaho Onodera | Anna Ohmiya | Yumie Funayama | Mina Kobayashi |
| 2022–23 | Sayaka Yoshimura | Yuna Kotani | Kaho Onodera | Anna Ohmiya | Mina Kobayashi |
| 2023–24 | Yuna Kotani | Kaho Onodera | Anna Ohmiya | Mina Kobayashi | Sayaka Yoshimura (Note: Yoshimura did not play during the 2023–24 season as she was on maternity leave. Yuna Kotani moved up to skip the team with Onodera, Ohmiya and Kobayashi each moving up a position as well.) |
| 2024–25 | Sayaka Yoshimura | Kaho Onodera (Note: Kaho Onodera and Yuna Kotani switched positions halfway through the season.) | Yuna Kotani | Anna Ohmiya | Mina Kobayashi |
| 2025–26 | Sayaka Yoshimura | Kaho Onodera | Yuna Kotani | Anna Ohmiya | Mina Kobayashi |
