= Almida de Val =

Swedish curler (born 1997)

- Curler
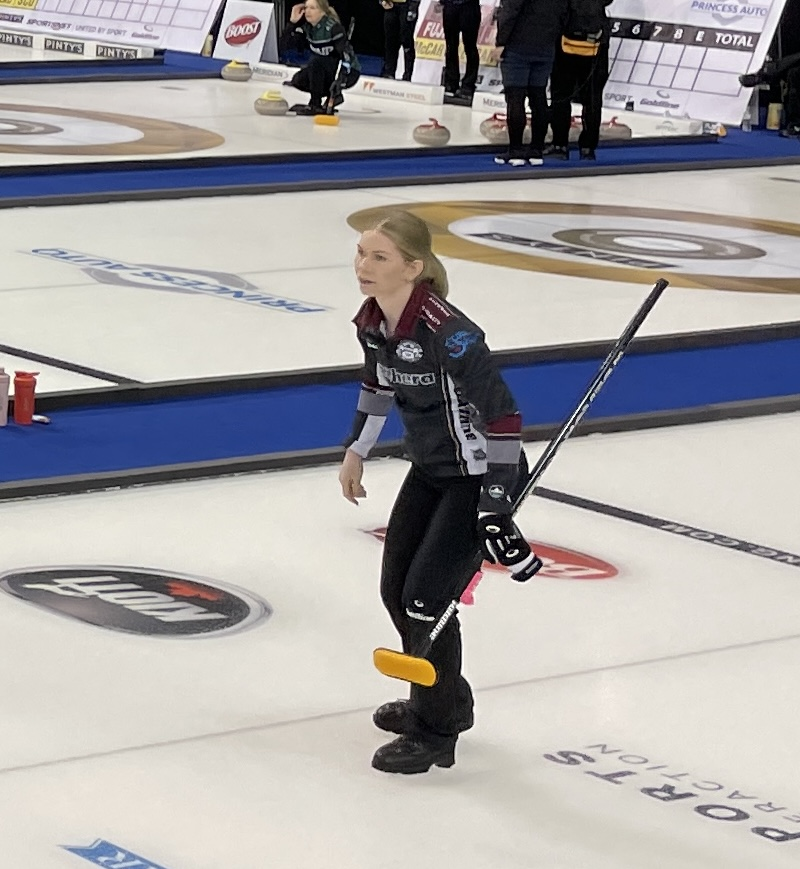
- de Val at the 2022 Players' Championship
- Born: 12 September 1997 (age 29); Gothenburg, Sweden

Team
- Curling club: Sundbybergs CK, Sundbyberg, SWE
- Skip: Isabella Wranå
- Third: Almida de Val
- Second: Moa Dryburgh
- Lead: Maria Larsson
- Alternate: Linda Stenlund

Curling career
- Member Association: Sweden
- World Championship: 1 (2026)
- World Mixed Doubles Championship: 1 (2021)
- European Championship: 2 (2023, 2026)
- Olympic: 1 (2022)
- Grand Slam victories: 2 (2023 Players', 2026 Masters)
Medal record
Women's curling
Representing Sweden
Olympic Games
Bronze medal – third place	2022 Beijing	Mixed doubles
World Championships
Bronze medal – third place	2026 Calgary
World Mixed Doubles Championships
Bronze medal – third place	2021 Aberdeen
European Curling Championships
Gold medal – first place	2026 Ostrava
World Junior Curling Championships
Gold medal – first place	2017 Gangneung
Silver medal – second place	2018 Aberdeen
Winter Universiade
Gold medal – first place	2019 Krasnoyarsk
Bronze medal – third place	2017 Almaty
Swedish Women's Championships
Gold medal – first place	2018 Skellefteå
Gold medal – first place	2022 Härnösand
Silver medal – second place	2019 Jönköping
Silver medal – second place	2023 Karlstad
Silver medal – second place	2024 Jönköping
Bronze medal – third place	2020 Jönköping
Swedish Mixed Doubles Championship
Gold medal – first place	2021 Jönköping

Almida Winquist de Val (born 12 September 1997) is a Swedish curler from Sundbyberg. She currently plays third on Team Isabella Wranå. With this team, she won a gold medal at the 2017 World Junior Curling Championships. Partering with Oskar Eriksson, she is the bronze medalist at 2022 Winter Olympics mixed doubles curling tournament.

de Val has studied engineering at KTH Royal Institute of Technology in Stockholm, where she received her master's degree in 2021.

== Career ==
=== Juniors ===
de Val played in the World Junior Curling Championships in 2014, 2017 and 2018 as a member of Team Isabella Wranå. In 2014, her team of Isabella Wranå, Jennie Wåhlin, Elin Lövstrand, and Fanny Sjöberg had a fourth-place finish after they lost in the bronze medal game to Russia. de Val was the alternate on the team but played no games. She was back at the event in 2017 as the official second of the team, replacing Lövstrand. The team made it all the way to the final and defeated Scotland's Sophie Jackson to win the gold medal, and lost just two round robin games in the process. The same team went undefeated the next year in the round robin but ended up losing to Canada's Kaitlyn Jones in the final. This team also represented Sweden at the 2017 Winter Universiade, where they took home the bronze medal and again in 2019, winning the gold medal. de Val represented Sweden one more time at the juniors in 2019 as the fourth for Tova Sundberg, who threw third stones. They placed sixth.

=== Women ===
As World Junior champions, the Wranå team qualified for the 2017 Humpty's Champions Cup, de Val's first Grand Slam event. The team did not qualify for the playoffs but did win one game. The team won their first World Curling Tour event at the 2018 AMJ Campbell Shorty Jenkins Classic. A month later, they won the Paf Masters Tour. Throughout the 2018–19 season, the team played in four slams, failing to qualify in any of the four. They won one game at the 2018 Tour Challenge, one game at the 2018 National, no games at the 2019 Canadian Open, and one game at the 2019 Champions Cup. Also during this season, the team won the 2019 Winter Universiade.

Team Wranå had a successful 2019–20 season, winning two tour events (the Royal LePage Women's Fall Classic and the Paf Masters Tour once again) and finishing second at the Women's Masters Basel and the Glynhill Ladies International. They played in two slam events, winning one game at both the 2019 Tour Challenge and the 2019 National.

Due to the COVID-19 pandemic, Team Wranå only played in one tour event during the abbreviated 2020–21 season. The team competed at the 2020 Women's Masters Basel, where they missed the playoffs with a 1–2 record. In December, they played Team Hasselborg in the Sweden National Challenge, where they won by a score of 17–12. The Swedish Women's Curling Championship was cancelled due to the pandemic, so Team Hasselborg was named as the Swedish Team for the 2021 World Women's Curling Championship. After the season, longtime lead Fanny Sjöberg stepped back from competitive curling and Maria Larsson joined the team as their new lead.

In their first event of the 2021–22 season, Team Wranå reached the final of the 2021 Euro Super Series where they lost to Rebecca Morrison. They also reached the semifinals of the 2021 Women's Masters Basel before being eliminated by Denmark's Madeleine Dupont. After missing the playoffs at the 2021 Masters, Team Wranå made the playoffs at a Grand Slam event for the first time at the 2021 National before being eliminated in the quarterfinals by Kelsey Rocque. Elsewhere on tour, the team reached the semifinals of both the Red Deer Curling Classic and the International Bernese Ladies Cup. At the Swedish Eliteserien in February, the team defeated Tova Sundberg to claim the event title. They also beat Sundberg in the final of the 2022 Swedish Women's Curling Championship in March. Team Wranå wrapped up their season at the 2022 Players' Championship Grand Slam where they once again qualified for the playoffs. They lost to Tracy Fleury in the quarterfinal round. After the season, Jennie Wåhlin stepped back from competitive curling and was replaced by Linda Stenlund. The revised lineup of the team saw Wranå and de Val continue at skip and third while Larsson moved up to second and Stenlund slotted in at lead.

Team Wranå finished third at their second event of the 2022–23 season, the 2022 Oslo Cup, defeating Marianne Rørvik 6–2. In September, the team competed in the European Qualifier best-of-seven series against Team Hasselborg, which they lost 4–1. They then had a quarterfinal finish at the 2022 Women's Masters Basel after a previously unbeaten record. In the first Slam of the season, the 2022 National, they finished pool play with a 2–2 record, but then lost 7–2 in a tiebreaker to the newly formed Kaitlyn Lawes rink. At the 2022 Tour Challenge, they again went 2–2 to qualify for a tiebreaker, which they won 7–4 over Hollie Duncan. Team Wranå then beat the World Champion Silvana Tirinzoni rink in the quarters before losing to Team Rachel Homan in the semifinal, marking the first time the team qualified for a Slam semifinal. They then lost in the final of the Sundbyberg Open to Team Hasselborg. The next Slam was the 2022 Masters, where the team missed the playoffs with a 1–3 record. The team began the New Year at the 2023 Canadian Open, where they qualified through the A side, defeating Team Hasselborg in the A final game. In the playoffs, they defeated Jennifer Jones in the quarterfinals before losing to Kerri Einarson in the semifinals. Team Wranå's next event was the 2023 International Bernese Ladies Cup where they went undefeated until the final where they fell to Team Tirinzoni. The following month, they played in the Swedish Women's Curling Championship, finishing second behind Hasselborg. That same month, the team faced off against Hasselborg again for a chance to play in the 2023 World Women's Curling Championship. The two teams played in a best-of-seven series, with Hasselborg winning in seven games. In their next two events, they finished third at the Sun City Cup and won the Swedish Eliteserien. The team finished off their season at the 2023 Players' Championship. There, they finished 4–1 record in group play, earning a bye to the semifinals. In the playoffs, they defeated Einarson, and then Tirinzoni in the finals to claim the team's first ever Grand Slam title.

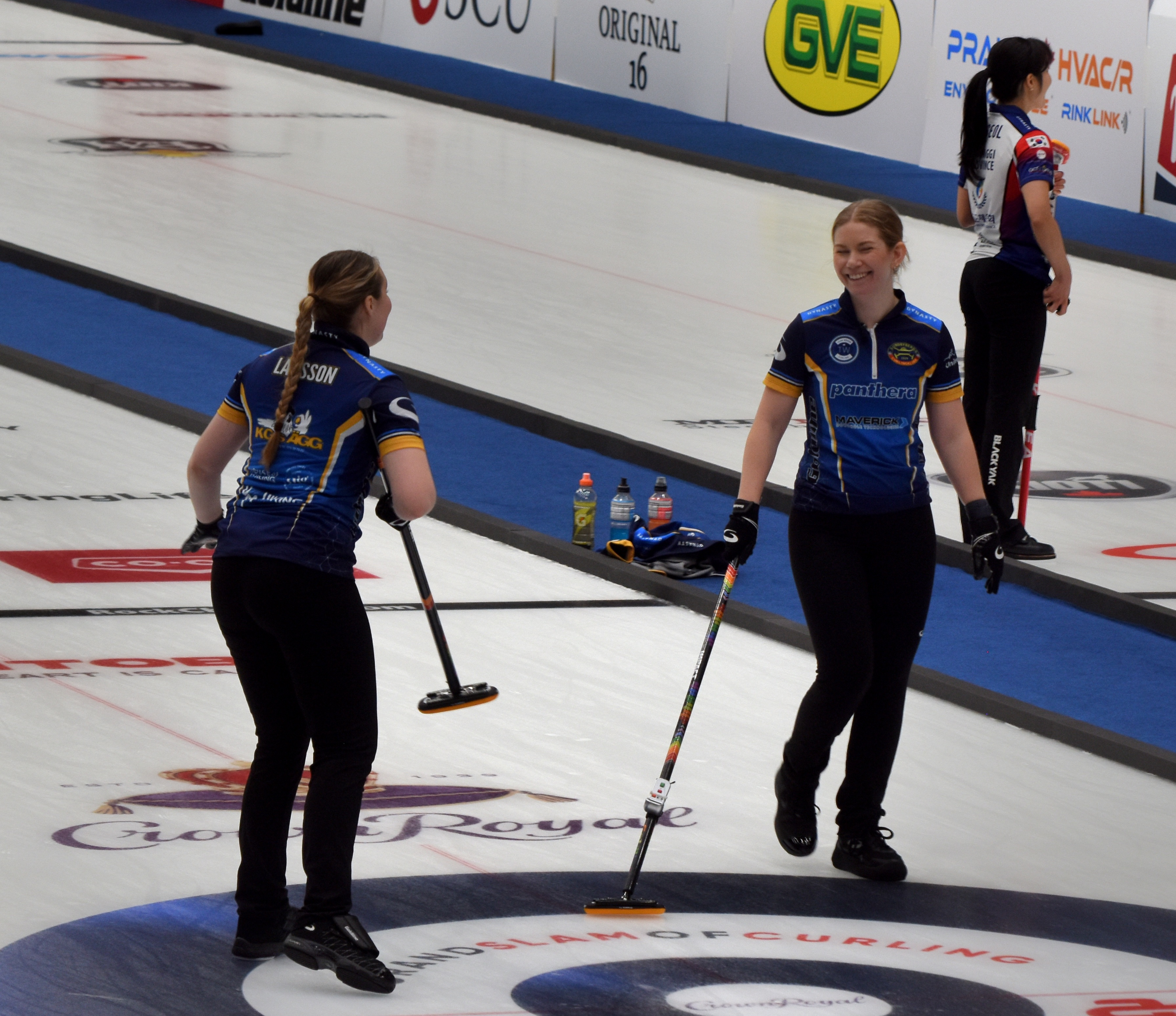
de Val (right) with Maria Larsson.

After suffering defeats to Team Hasselborg in both of their first two tour events, Team Wranå turned things around at the European qualifier as they won the series 4–2, earning them the right to represent Sweden at the 2023 European Curling Championships. In preparation for the Euros, the team played in the 2023 Players Open where they lost to Hasselborg in the final. They also played in two Slams, the 2023 Tour Challenge and the 2023 National, reaching the quarterfinals of the latter. In November, the team represented Sweden at the Europeans in Aberdeen. There, they finished third through the round robin with a 6–3 record, earning a spot in the playoffs. They then lost both the semifinal and bronze medal game to Italy and Norway respectively, finishing fourth. Back on tour, they reached the semifinals of the 2023 Western Showdown and the quarterfinals of the 2023 Masters and the 2024 International Bernese Ladies Cup. Days before the 2024 Swedish Women's Championship, Team Hasselborg was appointed to represent Sweden at the 2024 World Women's Curling Championship as they had accumulated more points than Team Wranå in their best five events. The team then lost the final of the Swedish Championship to Hasselborg. In February, Team Wranå won their sole event title of the season after an undefeated run at the Sun City Cup. To end the season, the team tried to defend their title at the 2024 Players' Championship. After a 4–1 record through the round robin, they beat Korea's Gim Eun-ji in the semifinal before coming up short to Silvana Tirinzoni in a rematch of the 2023 final.

To begin the 2024–25 season, Team Wranå lost the best-of-seven European qualifier to Team Hasselborg in four games. They also lost to Hasselborg in the quarterfinals of the 2024 Women's Masters Basel. On the Canadian tour, the team qualified for the semifinals at the 2024 Stu Sells Toronto Tankard and Saville Grand Prix and reached the quarterfinals at the 2024 Tour Challenge Slam. In December 2024, they won the WCT Take-Out Trophy, defeating Ikue Kitazawa in the final. In the new year, the team advanced to the semifinals of the 2025 Masters where they were again bested by Hasselborg. The following month, they defended their title at the Sun City Cup with an undefeated run. After Hasselborg was selected to represent Sweden at the 2025 World Women's Curling Championship, Team Wranå ended their season at the 2025 Players' Championship where after reaching the final in the previous two years, they finished with a 2–3 record.

In May 2025, Team Hasselborg was named as the Swedish Olympic team for the 2026 Winter Olympics and were also chosen for the 2025 European Curling Championships. Still chasing qualification points for the 2026 World Women's Curling Championship, Team Wranå began the season with a pair of semifinal finishes at the 2025 Stu Sells Oakville Tankard and 2025 Masters Slam. They also qualified for the quarterfinals at two other Slams, the 2025 Tour Challenge and 2026 Players' Championship, as well as the 2025 Canadian Open Tier 2. At the 2026 International Bernese Ladies Cup, Team Wranå lost in the final to Team Tirinzoni, however, with de Val skipping as Wranå was preparing for the mixed doubles competition at the Olympics. With their consistent playoff finishes throughout the season, the team earned enough points to surpass Hasselborg and qualify for the World Women's Championship, their first appearance at the event. There, the team finished fourth through the round robin with an 8–4 record. They then beat South Korea in the quarterfinals before dropping the semifinal to Switzerland. In the bronze medal game, the team won 8–5 over Japan's Satsuki Fujisawa to secure a podium finish.

Team Wranå started the 2026-27 curling season off strong, winning the 2026 Swedish European Qualifiers, winning the 2026 Karuizawa International Curling Championships, and a quarterfinal finish at the 2026 GSOC Invitational Slam. This success would continue into the 2026 European Curling Championships, where they would go undefeated and win their first European championship, beating Switzerland's Alina Pätz 7–2 in the final.

=== Mixed doubles ===
Aside from women's curling, de Val also plays mixed doubles, initially with partner Oskar Eriksson. The pair began playing together during the 2020–21 season and immediately found success by winning the 2020 Oberstdorf International Mixed Doubles Cup. In 2021, they won the Swedish mixed doubles national championship, de Val's first gold medal at a national championship. On 1 March 2021, the Swedish Curling Association formally announced the selection of Eriksson and de Val to represent Sweden at the 2021 World Mixed Doubles Curling Championship. At the World Championship, the team posted a perfect 9–0 record through the round robin, being the only team to do so. This qualified them for the semifinals, where they faced Kristin Skaslien and Magnus Nedregotten of Norway. Tied 6–6 in the final end, de Val missed her final draw, giving up a steal of one and the win to the Norwegians. They ended the tournament by defeating Canada's Kerri Einarson and Brad Gushue 7–4 in the bronze medal game.

On 4 June 2021, de Val and Eriksson were selected as the mixed doubles Olympic Team for the 2022 Winter Olympics. In preparation for the Olympics, the pair played in two mixed doubles events, the Aly Jenkins Mixed Doubles Memorial and the Gothenburg Mixed Doubles Cup, reaching the final of the latter. At the Games, de Val and Eriksson qualified for the playoffs with a 5–4 record. They then faced the top-ranked Italian pair of Stefania Constantini and Amos Mosaner in the semifinal, which they lost. They did still earn a medal from the Games, however, as they were able to beat Great Britain's Jennifer Dodds and Bruce Mouat 9–3 in the bronze medal game, a game where de Val shot a perfect 100%. After the game, de Val said that "This was our last chance, our last game, so we had nothing more to lose — just go out there and play the best we can. We both know that it's a lot more fun going home with a medal than without, so that really motivated us to really fight for this game."

== Grand Slam record ==
Key
C	Champion
F	Lost in Final
SF	Lost in Semifinal
QF	Lost in Quarterfinals
R16	Lost in the round of 16
Q	Did not advance to playoffs
T2	Played in Tier 2 event
DNP	Did not participate in event
N/A	Not a Grand Slam event that season

Event	2016–17	2017–18	2018–19	2019–20	2020–21	2021–22	2022–23	2023–24	2024–25	2025–26	2026–27
Invitational	DNP	DNP	Q	Q	N/A	N/A	SF	Q	QF	QF	QF
Masters	DNP	DNP	DNP	DNP	N/A	Q	Q	QF	SF	SF	C
National	DNP	DNP	Q	Q	N/A	QF	Q	QF	Q	Q	QF
Open	DNP	DNP	Q	DNP	N/A	N/A	SF	Q	Q	T2	
Players'	DNP	DNP	DNP	N/A	DNP	QF	C	F	Q	QF	
Champions Cup	Q	DNP	Q	N/A	DNP	DNP	DNP	N/A	N/A	N/A	N/A

== Teams ==
Season	Skip	Third	Second	Lead
2013–14	Greta Aurell	Tilde Vermelin	Camilla Schnabel	Almida de Val
2014–15	Almida de Val (Fourth)	Camilla Schnabel	Tilde Vermelin	Greta Aurell (Skip)
2015–16	Almida de Val (Fourth)	Camilla Schnabel	Tilde Vermelin	Greta Aurell (Skip)
2016–17	Isabella Wranå	Jennie Wåhlin	Almida de Val	Fanny Sjöberg
2017–18	Isabella Wranå	Jennie Wåhlin	Almida de Val	Fanny Sjöberg
2018–19	Isabella Wranå	Jennie Wåhlin	Almida de Val	Fanny Sjöberg
2019–20	Isabella Wranå	Almida de Val	Jennie Wåhlin	Fanny Sjöberg
2020–21	Isabella Wranå	Almida de Val	Jennie Wåhlin	Fanny Sjöberg
2021–22	Isabella Wranå	Almida de Val	Jennie Wåhlin	Maria Larsson
2022–23	Isabella Wranå	Almida de Val	Maria Larsson	Linda Stenlund
2023–24	Isabella Wranå	Almida de Val	Maria Larsson	Linda Stenlund
2024–25	Isabella Wranå	Almida de Val	Maria Larsson	Linda Stenlund
2025–26	Isabella Wranå	Almida de Val	Maria Larsson	Linda Stenlund
2026–27	Isabella Wranå	Almida de Val	Moa Dryburgh	Maria Larsson
