= Jennie Wåhlin =

Swedish curler

- Curler
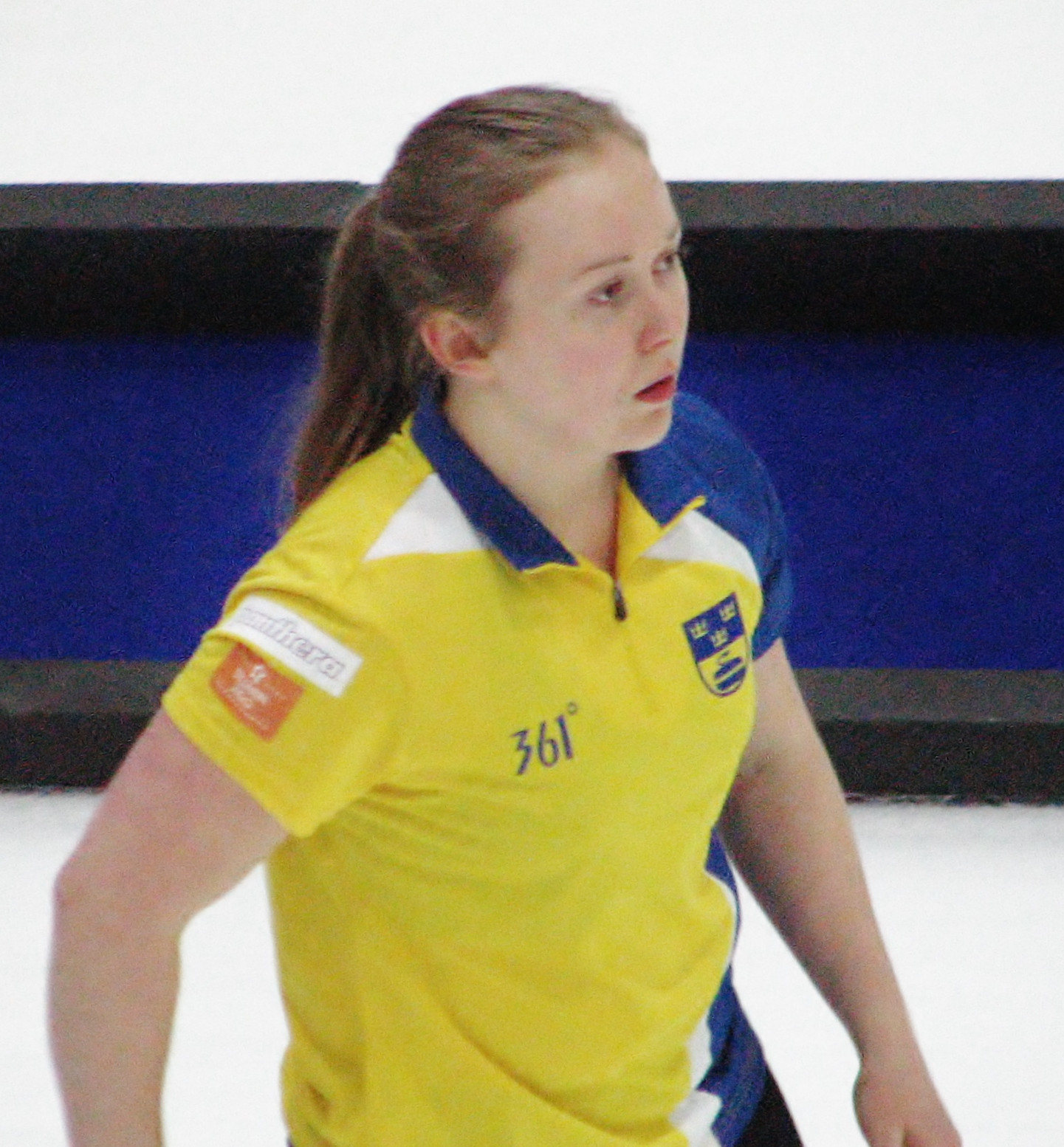
- Wåhlin at the 2015 World Junior Curling Championships
- Born: 26 November 1997 (age 28); Stockholm, Sweden

Team
- Curling club: Sundbybergs CK, Sundbyberg, Sweden

Curling career
- Member Association: Sweden
- World Championship: 2 (2017, 2018)
- World Mixed Championship: 2 (2016, 2023)
- European Championship: 2 (2017, 2023)
- Olympic: 1 (2018)
Medal record
Women's Curling
Representing Sweden
Olympic Games
Gold medal – first place	2018 Pyeongchang	Team
World Championships
Silver medal – second place	2018 North Bay
European Championships
Silver medal – second place	2017 St Gallen
Winter Universiade
Gold medal – first place	2019 Krasnoyarsk
World Junior Championships
Gold medal – first place	2017 Gangneung
Silver medal – second place	2018 Aberdeen
World Mixed Championships
Gold medal – first place	2023 Aberdeen
Silver medal – second place	2016 Kazan
Swedish Women's Championships
Gold medal – first place	2018 Skellefteå
Gold medal – first place	2022 Härnösand
Silver medal – second place	2016 Piteå
Silver medal – second place	2019 Jönköping
Bronze medal – third place	2020 Jönköping

Jennie Frances Wåhlin (born 26 November 1997) is a Swedish curler from Huddinge. She was a longtime member of Team Isabella Wranå. She won a gold medal at the 2018 Winter Olympics as alternate for the Anna Hasselborg team.

In 2018 she was inducted into the Swedish Curling Hall of Fame.

== Career ==
=== Juniors ===
Wåhlin played in the World Junior Curling Championships in 2014, 2015, 2017 and 2018 as a member of Team Isabella Wranå. In 2014, her team of Wranå, Elin Lövstrand, Almida de Val and Fanny Sjöberg had a fourth-place finish, after they lost in the bronze medal game to Russia. In 2015, she and teammates Wranå, Wåhlin, Johanna Heldin and Johanna Höglund again finished fourth after this time losing to Switzerland in the bronze medal game. She was back at the event in 2017 where her team won the gold medal, defeating Scotland's Sophie Jackson in the final, and lost just two round robin games in the process. The next year the same team went undefeated in the round robin, but ended up losing to Canada's Kaitlyn Jones in the final. This team also represented Sweden at the 2017 Winter Universiade, where they took home the bronze medal. Wåhlin represented Sweden one more time at the juniors in 2019 as second for Tova Sundberg. They placed sixth.

=== Women's ===
As World Junior champions, the Wranå rink qualified for the 2017 Humpty's Champions Cup, Wåhlin's first Grand Slam event. The team did not qualify for the playoffs but did win one game. The team won their first World Curling Tour event at the 2018 AMJ Campbell Shorty Jenkins Classic. A month later, they won the Paf Masters Tour. Over the course of the 2018–19 season, the team played in four slams, failing to qualify in any of the four. They won one game at the 2018 Tour Challenge, one game at the 2018 National, no games at the 2019 Canadian Open and one game at the 2019 Champions Cup. Also during this season, the team won the 2019 Winter Universiade.

Team Wranå had a successful 2019–20 season, winning two tour events (the Royal LePage Women's Fall Classic and the Paf Masters Tour once again) and finishing second at the Women's Masters Basel and the Glynhill Ladies International. They played in two slam events, winning one game at both the 2019 Tour Challenge and the 2019 National.

Due to the COVID-19 pandemic, Team Wranå only played in one tour event during the abbreviated 2020–21 season. The team competed at the 2020 Women's Masters Basel, where they missed the playoffs with a 1–2 record. In December, they played Team Hasselborg in the Sweden National Challenge, where they won by a score of 17–12. The Swedish Women's Curling Championship was cancelled due to the pandemic, so Team Hasselborg was named as the Swedish Team for the 2021 World Women's Curling Championship. After the season, longtime lead Fanny Sjöberg stepped back from competitive curling and Maria Larsson joined the team as their new lead.

In their first event of the 2021–22 season, Team Wranå reached the final of the 2021 Euro Super Series where they lost to Rebecca Morrison. They also reached the semifinals of the 2021 Women's Masters Basel before being eliminated by Denmark's Madeleine Dupont. After missing the playoffs at the 2021 Masters, Team Wranå made the playoffs at a Grand Slam event for the first time at the 2021 National before being eliminated in the quarterfinals by Kelsey Rocque. Elsewhere on tour, the team reached the semifinals of both the Red Deer Curling Classic and the International Bernese Ladies Cup. At the Swedish Eliteserien in February, the team defeated Tova Sundberg to claim the event title. They also beat Sundberg in the final of the 2022 Swedish Women's Curling Championship in March. Team Wranå wrapped up their season at the 2022 Players' Championship Grand Slam where they once again qualified for the playoffs. They then lost to Tracy Fleury in the quarterfinal round.

After the 2021–22 season concluded, Wåhlin decided to step back from competitive curling. She returned briefly in 2023 as Team Wranå's alternate when they represented Sweden at the 2023 European Curling Championships. There, they finished third through the round robin with a 6–3 record, earning a spot in the playoffs. They then lost both the semifinal and bronze medal game to Italy and Norway respectively, finishing fourth. Wåhlin played in one game against Germany where the team won 8–5.

Aside from Team Wranå, Wåhlin has also been the alternate for the Anna Hasselborg rink. She has been to two world championships with them, winning a silver medal in 2018 and won an Olympic gold medal at the 2018 Winter Olympics. Wåhlin didn't play any games however.

=== Mixed ===
In 2016, Wåhlin played third on the Swedish team at the 2016 World Mixed Curling Championship. With skip Kristian Lindström, second Joakim Flyg and lead Johanna Heldin, the team went undefeated through the round robin to qualify for the playoffs as the top ranked team. They then beat New Zealand, Japan and Scotland to qualify for the final. There, they fell 5–4 to Russia's Alexander Krushelnitskiy, earning the silver medal.

Wåhlin returned to the mixed championship seven years later in 2023 with a new team of Johan Nygren, Fredrik Carlsén and longtime teammate Fanny Sjöberg. The team dominated the round robin, again finishing as the first seeds with an 8–0 record. They then beat Belgium in the quarterfinals and Canada in the semifinals, qualifying for the final. There, they downed Spain's Sergio Vez 8–2 to claim Sweden's first World Mixed title.

== Grand Slam record ==
Key
C	Champion
F	Lost in Final
SF	Lost in Semifinal
QF	Lost in Quarterfinals
R16	Lost in the round of 16
Q	Did not advance to playoffs
T2	Played in Tier 2 event
DNP	Did not participate in event
N/A	Not a Grand Slam event that season

Event	2016–17	2017–18	2018–19	2019–20	2020–21	2021–22	2022–23
The National	DNP	DNP	Q	Q	N/A	QF	Q
Tour Challenge	DNP	DNP	Q	Q	N/A	N/A	DNP
Masters	DNP	DNP	DNP	DNP	N/A	Q	DNP
Canadian Open	DNP	DNP	Q	DNP	N/A	N/A	DNP
Players'	DNP	DNP	DNP	N/A	DNP	QF	DNP
Champions Cup	Q	DNP	Q	N/A	DNP	DNP	DNP

== Teams ==
Season	Skip	Third	Second	Lead
2012–13	Isabella Wranå	Jennie Wåhlin	Elin Lövstrand	Fanny Sjöberg
2013–14	Isabella Wranå	Jennie Wåhlin	Elin Lövstrand	Fanny Sjöberg
2014–15	Isabella Wranå	Jennie Wåhlin	Elin Lövstrand	Fanny Sjöberg
2015–16	Isabella Wranå	Jennie Wåhlin	Johanna Hoeglund	Fanny Sjöberg
2016–17	Isabella Wranå	Jennie Wåhlin	Almida de Val	Fanny Sjöberg
2017–18	Isabella Wranå	Jennie Wåhlin	Almida de Val	Fanny Sjöberg
2018–19	Isabella Wranå	Jennie Wåhlin	Almida de Val	Fanny Sjöberg
2019–20	Isabella Wranå	Almida de Val	Jennie Wåhlin	Fanny Sjöberg
2020–21	Isabella Wranå	Almida de Val	Jennie Wåhlin	Fanny Sjöberg
2021–22	Isabella Wranå	Almida de Val	Jennie Wåhlin	Maria Larsson
