= Paf (company) =

Gambling company owned by the regional government of Åland, Finland

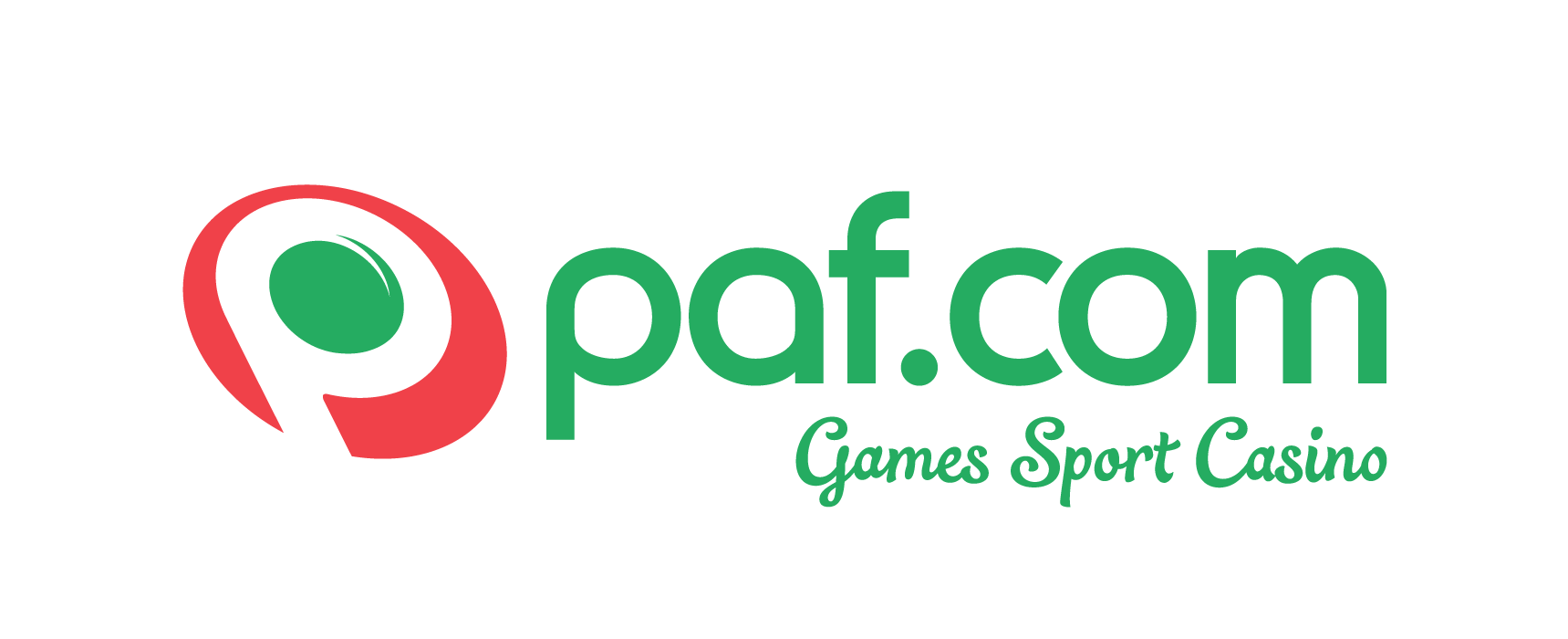
- Native name: Ålands Penningautomatförening
- Type: Government agency
- Industry: Gambling & casinos
- Founded: 1966
- Headquarters: Mariehamn, Åland, Finland
- Area served: Worldwide except non-regulated countries
- Key people: Christer Fahlstedt (CEO)
- Products: Slots, bingo, casino, poker, online betting, live betting, lotteries
- Services: Online gambling, slot machines, casino services
- Revenue: €214.5 million (2025)
- Net income: €57.2 million (2025)
- Number of employees: 295 (2025)
- Parent: Ålands Penningautomatförening
- Subsidiaries: paf.es
- Website: www.paf.com

Ålands Penningautomatförening (commonly abbreviated Paf) is a government-owned gambling operator in the autonomous Finnish region of Åland. Established in 1966, it has legal authority under Åland’s gambling framework to provide gambling on the islands, online, and on passenger vessels operating from the region.

Paf’s operations include online gambling, gambling on board passenger ships in the Baltic Sea and surrounding Nordic sea routes, and land-based gaming such as slot machines on Åland.

== History ==
Paf was founded in 1966 by a group of non-profit organisations in Åland, including Folkhälsan på Åland, Rädda Barnen (Save the Children), the Röda Korset (Finnish Red Cross), and the Dagens Barn foundation.

The company began operating on Åland-registered ferries in the early 1970s, and launched its first online games in 1999.

In 2015, Paf and Sunborn Hotel opened Casino Sunborn in Gibraltar. The casino was sold to Admiral in 2018.

In 2021, the Supreme Court of Finland sentenced Paf to a community fine of €250,000 in a case concerning negligent money laundering.

In 2024, Paf announced a commitment to achieving net-zero greenhouse gas emissions by 2040, a target validated by the Science Based Targets initiative (SBTi).

== Markets and brands ==
Paf conducts licensed gaming operations in several European markets through a portfolio of consumer brands that varies by country. Its core brands include Paf.com, Paf.se, Paf.es and Paf.ee. In Sweden, the company also operates SpeedyBet.com, SpeedyCasino.com, X3000.com, GoldenBull.se, 1x2.se and CasinoEpic.se. In Spain, it operates GoldenBull.es, SpeedyBet.es and PiñataCasino.es, while in Latvia it operates 11.lv, PafBet.lv and X3000.lv.

In addition to its consumer brands, Paf provides the gaming platform for mycasino.ch in Switzerland through a partnership with Grand Casino Luzern. In 2025, mycasino.ch was the market leader in Switzerland's online casino market and reported gross gaming revenue of CHF 95.4 million.

== Distribution of surplus ==
Paf's surplus is distributed by the Government of Åland and an independent allocation council to public-benefit associations, organisations and charitable causes. Since Paf was founded in 1966, more than €527.9 million has been distributed through this system.

One example of the surplus distribution took place in 2024, when the Government of Åland allocated €3 million from Paf's surplus to the Olena Zelenska Foundation. The funding was intended to restore and equip school shelters in Ukraine. Ukraine's First Lady Olena Zelenska visited Åland on 20 March 2025 in connection with the donation.

== Responsible gambling initiatives ==
In 2018, Paf became the first international gaming company to introduce a mandatory annual loss limit, initially set at €30,000 per customer. The limit has been progressively lowered since then. As of 2026, the limit stands at €15,000 per year for customers aged 25 and over, €6,000 for those aged 20–24, and €1,800 for customers aged 18–19 – representing a 50% reduction from the original cap. Paf has stated a long-term ambition to lower the limit further to €8,000 per year.

== Awards and recognition ==
- 2014 – Social Responsibility Award, eGaming Review Operator Awards.
- 2017 – Social Responsibility Award, eGaming Review Nordic Awards.
- 2018 – Best Marketing Campaign, eGaming Review Nordics Awards.
- 2018 – Named one of Finland's 40 most inspiring workplaces by consulting firm Corporate Spirit Ltd.
