= SaskTel Tankard =

Canadian annual provincial championship for men's curling

- Sponsor: SaskTel
- Established: 1927; 99 years ago
- 2026 host city: Melville, Saskatchewan
- 2026 arena: CN Community Centre
- 2026 champion: Kelly Knapp

Current edition
- 2026 SaskTel Tankard

The SaskTel Tankard is the annual provincial championship for men's curling in Saskatchewan, with the winner representing the province at the Montana's Brier, the national men's championship. The bonspiel, which is organized by CURLSASK, the provincial curling association, is also known as the SaskTel Provincial Men's Curling Championship. SaskTel became the title sponsor in 2004; the Tankard was previously known as the Macdonald Tankard (1927–1979), the Labatt Tankard (1980–1994), the Saskatchewan Wheat Pool Tankard (1995–2003), and the SaskTel Mobility Tankard (2004–2006).

== Qualification and format ==
The number of teams participating and the format of the bonspiel has varied over the years. Until 2022, the SaskTel Tankard was a sixteen team-seeded triple knockout bonspiel with a page playoff system; the sixteen teams qualified as follows:

1. Six berths were awarded based on Southern and Northern Playdown qualifying events.
2. Four berths were awarded to the highest ranked Saskatchewan teams from the national CTRS ranking.
3. One berth was awarded to the highest ranked registered Saskatchewan team from the Saskatchewan Curling Tour (SCT).
4. Four berths were awarded from SCT provincial berth bonspiels.
5. One berth was awarded at the SaskTour Players' Championship.

At the provincial final, the A Event winner, B Event winner, and the two finalists of the C Event advanced to the page playoff.

In 2022, the number of teams was reduced to twelve but the event remained a triple knockout with a page playoff. Qualification was also simplified to include the top four teams on the CTRS, the top four ranked teams on the SCT, and four teams qualifying through direct events, called the Men's Last Chance.

To align more closely with the Brier, the format of the tournament was changed in 2024 with teams divided into two pools of six teams leading to a page playoff.

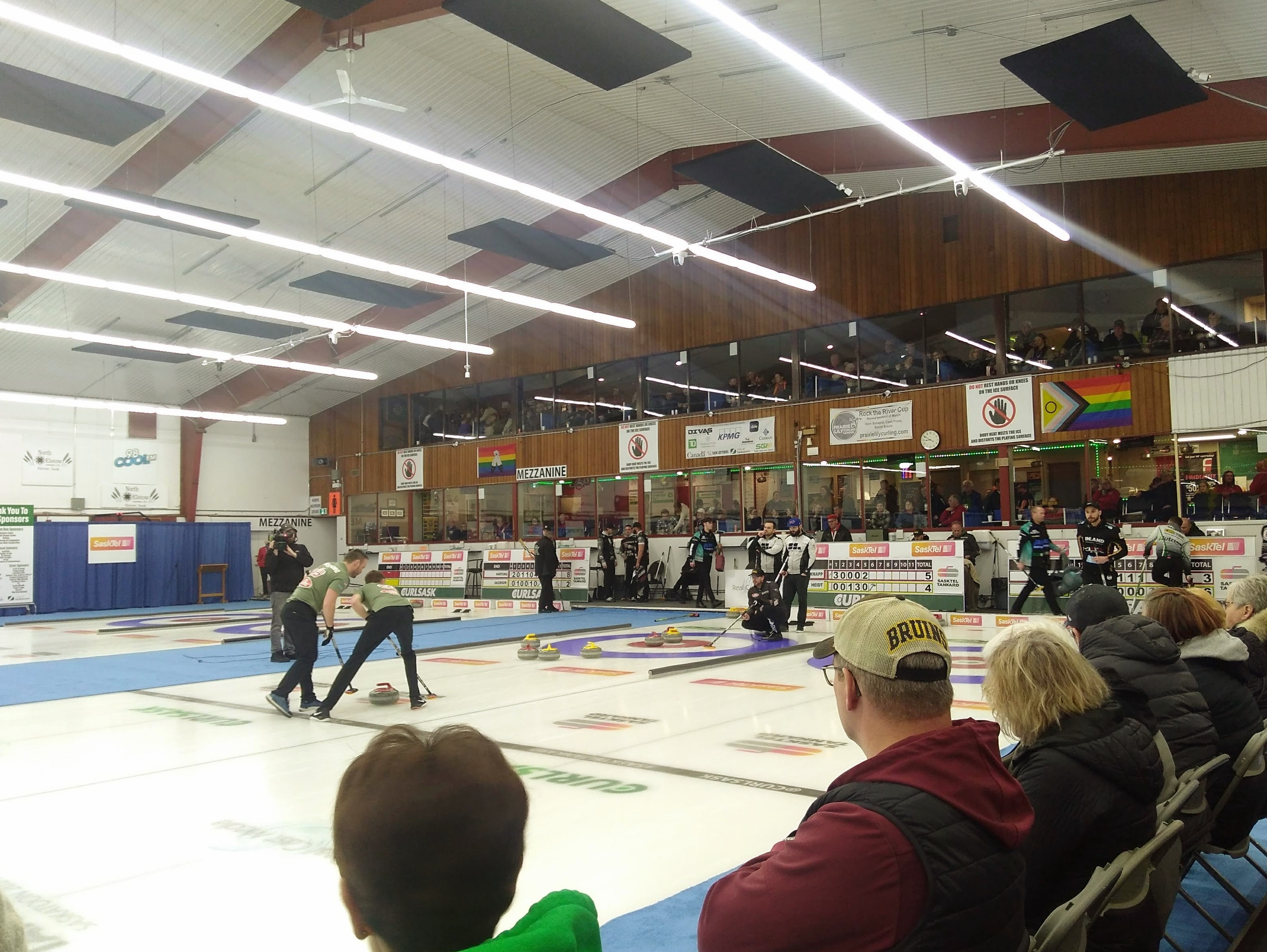
A draw at the 2024 SaskTel Tankard at the Nutana Curling Club in Saskatoon.

== Champions ==
The Saskatchewan Tankard has been contested annually since 1927, with the event cancelled only once, in 2021, due to the COVID-19 pandemic.

Into the 1970s, two families were able to establish impressive records. A team of Campbells from Avonlea, skipped by Garnet Campbell, won their first Tankard in 1947, and won three more in the 1950s, along with the province's first national title at the 1955 Macdonald Brier in Regina. Garnet would go on to form a productive partnership with Bob Pickering, winning another six Tankards for a record ten overall. Altogether, the six Campbells won twenty four Tankards between 1947 and 1971. The Richardson family, led by skip Ernie Richardson out of Regina, won five Tankards in a six year span from 1959 to 1964, and went on to win four Brier titles and four world championships, including the first ever at the 1959 Scotch Cup. Altogether, the Richardson clan won fourteen Tankards. The other two rinks who went on to Brier success were Harvey Mazinke's, who won the 1973 Macdonald Brier, and Rick Folk's, who won three consecutive Tankards and the 1980 Labatt Brier.

In the twenty first century, Pat Simmons won four consecutive Tankards as a skip from 2005 to 2008, and a fifth in 2011 with Steve Laycock skipping but throwing third stones. Laycock has won seven Tankards overall, including five as skip. The most recent Tankard champion is Mike McEwen, who teamed up with former Tankard champions Colton Flasch, Kevin Marsh, and Dan Marsh. The 2024 Montana's Brier was McEwen's ninth, but his first representing Saskatchewan after previous entries with Manitoba and Ontario.

=== List of champions ===
Teams in bold denote national championships

| Year | Skip | Third | Second | Lead | Winning club |
|---|---|---|---|---|---|
| 2026 | Kelly Knapp | Brennen Jones | Dustin Kidby | Mat Ring | Highland Curling Club |
| 2025 | Rylan Kleiter | Joshua Mattern | Matthew Hall | Trevor Johnson | Nutana Curling Club |
| 2024 | Mike McEwen | Colton Flasch | Kevin Marsh | Dan Marsh | Nutana Curling Club |
| 2023 | Kelly Knapp | Brennen Jones | Mike Armstrong | Trent Knapp | Highland Curling Club |
| 2022 | Colton Flasch | Catlin Schneider | Kevin Marsh | Dan Marsh | Nutana Curling Club |
| 2021 | Cancelled due to the COVID-19 pandemic in Saskatchewan. Team Dunstone (Matt Dunstone, Braeden Moskowy, Kirk Muyres, Dustin Kidby) invited to represent Saskatchewan at Brier | | | | |
| 2020 | Matt Dunstone | Braeden Moskowy | Catlin Schneider | Dustin Kidby | Highland Curling Club |
| 2019 | Kirk Muyres | Kevin Marsh | Dan Marsh | Dallan Muyres | Nutana Curling Club |
| 2018 | Steve Laycock (Note: Team was skipped by Laycock, but Dunstone threw fourth stones.) | Matt Dunstone | Kirk Muyres | Dallan Muyres | Nutana Curling Club |
| 2017 | Adam Casey | Catlin Schneider | Shaun Meachem | Dustin Kidby | Highland Curling Club |
| 2016 | Steve Laycock | Kirk Muyres | Colton Flasch | Dallan Muyres | Nutana Curling Club |
| 2015 | Steve Laycock | Kirk Muyres | Colton Flasch | Dallan Muyres | Nutana Curling Club |
| 2014 | Steve Laycock | Kirk Muyres | Colton Flasch | Dallan Muyres | Nutana Curling Club |
| 2013 | Brock Virtue | Braeden Moskowy | Chris Schille | D. J. Kidby | Caledonian Curling Club |
| 2012 | Scott Manners | Tyler Lang | Ryan Deis | Mike Armstrong | Battleford Curling Club |
| 2011 | Steve Laycock (Note: Team was skipped by Laycock, but Simmons threw fourth stones and the team was known as Team Simmons.) | Pat Simmons | Brennen Jones | Dallan Muyres | Tartan Curling Club |
| 2010 | Darrell McKee | Bruce Korte | Roger Korte | Rob Markowsky | Nutana Curling Club |
| 2009 | Joel Jordison | Scott Bitz | Aryn Schmidt | Dean Hicke | Bushell Park Curling Club |
| 2008 | Pat Simmons | Jeff Sharp | Gerry Adam | Steve Laycock | Davidson Curling Club |
| 2007 | Pat Simmons | Jeff Sharp | Gerry Adam | Steve Laycock | Davidson Curling Club |
| 2006 | Pat Simmons | Jeff Sharp | Chris Haichert | Ben Hebert | Davidson Curling Club |
| 2005 | Pat Simmons | Jeff Sharp | Chris Haichert | Ben Hebert | Davidson Curling Club |
| 2004 | Bruce Korte | Clint Dieno | Roger Korte | Rory Golanowski | Muenster Curling Club |
| 2003 | Doug Harcourt | Kevin Kalthoff | Greg Harcourt | Brian Wempe | Quill Lake Curling Club |
| 2002 | Scott Bitz | Mark Lang | Brian McCusker | Kelly Moskowy | Caledonian Curling Club |
| 2001 | Doug Harcourt | Kevin Kalthoff | Greg Harcourt | Brian Wempe | Humboldt Curling Club |
| 2000 | Bruce Korte | Darrell McKee | Roger Korte | Rory Golanowski | Granite Curling Club |
| 1999 | Gerald Shymko | Gerry Adam | Arnie Geisler | Neil Cursons | Yorkton Curling Club |
| 1998 | Rod Montgomery | Glen Despins | Dwayne Mihalicz | Jeff Tait | Hillcrest Curling Club |
| 1997 | Jim Packet | Jeff Mosley | Dallas Duce | Ken Loeffler | Estevan Curling Club |
| 1996 | Rod Montgomery | Glen Despins | Dwayne Mihalicz | Sandy Forsyth | Hillcrest Curling Club |
| 1995 | Brad Heidt | Mark Dacey | Wayne Charteris | Dan Ormsby | Kerrobert Curling Club |
| 1994 | Doug Harcourt | Kevin Kalthoff | Greg Harcourt | Brian Wempe | Quill Lake Curling Club |
| 1993 | Randy Woytowich | Brian McCusker | Wyatt Buck | John Grundy | Tartan Curling Club |
| 1992 | Brad Hebert | Warren Sharp | Bob Novakowski | Kerry Gudereit | Caledonian Curling Club |
| 1991 | Randy Woytowich | Brian McCusker | Wyatt Buck | John Grundy | Tartan Curling Club |
| 1990 | Jamie Schneider | Rick Schneider | Mike Schneider | Larry Schneider | Kronau Curling Club |
| 1989 | Jim Packet | Bob Doerr | Lloyd Schmidt | Dallas Duce | Estevan Curling Club |
| 1988 | Eugene Hritzuk | Del Shaughnessy | Murray Soparlo | Don Dabrowski | Nutana Curling Club |
| 1987 | Don Gardiner | Garry Krupski | Ray Krupski | Mark Krupski | Lemberg Curling Club |
| 1986 | Lyle Muyres | Warren Muyres | Craig Muyres | Garth Muyres | Humboldt Curling Club |
| 1985 | Eugene Hritzuk | Bob Miller | Nick Paulsen | Art Paulsen | Nutana Curling Club |
| 1984 | Gary Bryden | Dale Graham | Wilf Foss | Jerry Zimmer | Caledonian Curling Club |
| 1983 | Kirk Ziola | Jim Packet | Monte Ziola | John Grundy | Estevan Curling Club |
| 1982 | Brad Heidt | Wayne Charteris | Jack Whetter | Warren Rechenmacher | Kerrobert Curling Club |
| 1981 | Bob Ellert | Don Bushell | Ken Berner | Bill Wilson | Assiniboia Curling Club |
| **1980** | **Rick Folk** | **Ron Mills** | **Tom Wilson** | **Jim Wilson** | **Nutana Curling Club** |
| 1979 | Rick Folk | Rod Thompson | Tom Wilson | Jim Wilson | Nutana Curling Club |
| 1978 | Rick Folk | Rod Thompson | Tom Wilson | Rodger Schmidt | Nutana Curling Club |
| 1977 | Les Rogers | Greg Manwaring | Morris Tait | Vic Rogers | Caledonian Curling Club |
| 1976 | Roger Anholt | Gordon Stewart | Bob Hicks | Bill Wilson | Moose Jaw Country Club |
| 1975 | Harvey Mazinke | Bill Martin | George Achtymichuk | Dan Klippenstein | Regina Curling Club |
| 1974 | Larry McGrath | Ron St. John | Wayne St. John | Rod St. John | Kindersley Curling Club |
| **1973** | **Harvey Mazinke** | **Bill Martin** | **George Achtymichuk** | **Dan Klippenstein** | **Regina Curling Club** |
| 1972 | Doug Wyatt | Glen Farrell | Murray Trapp | Dale Zoerb | Hub City Curling Club |
| 1971 | Bob Pickering | Garnet Campbell | Jack Keys | Gary Ford | Avonlea Curling Club |
| 1970 | Bob Pickering | Garnet Campbell | Jack Keys | Gary Ford | Avonlea Curling Club |
| 1969 | Bob Pickering | Garnet Campbell | Jim Thomas | Gary Ford | Avonlea Curling Club |
| 1968 | Bob Pickering | Jack Keys | Garnet Campbell | Gary Ford | Avonlea Curling Club |
| 1967 | Doug Wankel | Art Knutson | Gay Knutson | Elmer Knutson | Elbow Curling Club |
| 1966 | Bob Pickering | Jack Keys | Garnet Campbell | Glen Campbell | Avonlea Curling Club |
| 1965 | Harold Worth | Elmer MacNevin | Murray Armstrong | Gary Stevenson | Hub City Curling Club |
| 1964 | Ernie Richardson | Arnold Richardson | Garnet Richardson | Wes Richardson | Regina Curling Club |
| **1963** | **Ernie Richardson** | **Arnold Richardson** | **Garnet Richardson** | **Mel Perry** | **Regina Curling Club** |
| **1962** | **Ernie Richardson** | **Arnold Richardson** | **Garnet Richardson** | **Wes Richardson** | **Regina Curling Club** |
| 1961 | Jack Keys | Garnet Campbell | Bob Pickering | Glen Campbell | Avonlea Curling Club |
| **1960** | **Ernie Richardson** | **Arnold Richardson** | **Garnet Richardson** | **Wes Richardson** | **Regina Civil Service Club** |
| **1959** | **Ernie Richardson** | **Arnold Richardson** | **Garnet Richardson** | **Wes Richardson** | **Regina Civil Service Club** |
| 1958 | Gordon Grimes | R. John Sutherland | Syd Gardiner | Stu St. John | Eston Curling Club |
| 1957 | Garnet Campbell | Glen Campbell | Don Campbell | Lloyd Campbell | Avonlea Curling Club |
| 1956 | Jim Hill | Harold Worth | Elmer MacNevin | Don Morris | Delisle Curling Club |
| **1955** | **Garnet Campbell** | **Don Campbell** | **Glen Campbell** | **Lloyd Campbell** | **Avonlea Curling Club** |
| 1954 | Garnet Campbell | Don Campbell | Glen Campbell | Gordon Campbell | Avonlea Curling Club |
| 1953 | Jim Hill | Jack Bentley | Harold Worth | Elmer MacNevin | Delisle Curling Club |
| 1952 | Frank Hastings | Nels Witherow | Alvin Turner | Fritz Ostberg | Nipawan Curling Club |
| 1951 | Johnny Franklin | Cliff Annable | George Heartwell | Harold Lloyd | Rosetown Curling Club |
| 1950 | Ernie Whitter | Buster Ortloff | Bill Whitter | Jim Whitter | Prince Albert Curling Club |
| 1949 | Harold Horeak | Edward Richter | John Heaney | Ernest Kittleson | Caledonian Curling Club |
| 1948 | Cliff Annable | Johnny Franklin | Bill Heartwell | John Sansom | Rosetown Curling Club |
| 1947 | Garnet Campbell | Glen Campbell | Lloyd Campbell | Sandy Campbell | Avonlea Curling Club |
| 1946 | Dalt Henderson | Jack Brower | Cliff Annable | Monty Burns | Nutana Curling Club |
| 1945 | W. H. Hain | D. S. Craighton | Hi Green | Fred Martin | Saskatoon |
| 1944 | Jack Forsythe | Herb Clement | Percy Clement | Rollie Postlewaite | Saskatoon |
| 1943 | S. Glover | Doug Cook | Bergie Bergstrom | Cec George | Saskatoon |
| 1942 | Johnny Franklin | Fraser Heartwell | John D. Lang | John Sansom | Rosetown Curling Club |
| 1941 | Bill Dunbar | Bert McMahon | Jimmy Beckett | A. E. McMahon | Kinley Curling Club |
| 1940 | Bill Dunbar | Bert McMahon | Jimmy Beckett | E. Ronald Eaton | Kinley Curling Club |
| 1939 | George Dunbar | Jack Brower | F. Robert Glass | James A. L. McNeill | Prince Albert Curling Club |
| 1938 | Manfield Humphries | Jack Brower | George Dunbar | Sudbury Reed | Prince Albert Curling Club |
| 1937 | Frank Smith | William J. Turner | Earl Gordon West | Archibald H. Graham | Moose Jaw Curling Club |
| 1936 | Les Youngstown | Dave Clayton | Charles Gardner Jr. | C. A. McNevin | Regina Curling Club |
| 1935 | J. S. "Jimmy" Black | Frank Germaine | Sid Peat | Reg Fraser | Nutana Curling Club |
| 1934 | Charles Anderson | R. B. McLeod | Edward Robertson | Pat McNeill | Nutana Curling Club |
| 1933 | Cliff McLachlan | Fred Hayes | William Stuart | Bill Baum | Rosthern Curling Club |
| 1932 | Carl Battell | Frank R. Smith | Pallie Pascoe | Jim MacDonald | Moose Jaw Curling Club |
| 1931 | Jack Miller | Bill McArter | Bert Barbour | Percy Young | Saskatoon Curling Club |
| 1930 | Bob McLeod | Bill McArter | Rube Watts | Alex Scollon | Granite Curling Club |
| 1929 | Dick Ross | Ash Parkinson | A. Smith | W. Nesbitt | Regina Curling Club |
| 1928 | W. L. McGillivray | Fred Graham | Ralph Teasdale | C. S. Pace | Regina Curling Club |
| 1927 | Oswald Barkwell | Alf Hill | Hector Hay | Pete Wilken | Yellow Grass Curling Club |

== See also ==
- Bunge Prairie Pinnacle
- List of curling clubs in Saskatchewan
