= Canad Inns Men's Classic =

Annual Curling Tournament

Location in Canada

The Canad Inns Men's Classic (formerly the Meyers Norris Penny Prairie Classic and the Canad Inns Prairie Classic) is an annual curling tournament, held in October at the Portage Curling Club in Portage la Prairie, Manitoba. It is part of the World Curling Tour. The purse for the event $60,000. Except for the Grand Slam events, it is currently the men's WCT event with the highest purse.

== Past champions ==
Year	Winning team	Runner-up team	Purse (CAD)
2005	(Saskatchewan) Brad Heidt, Joel Jordison, Brent Gedak, Mitch Heidt	(Manitoba) Ryan Fry, Kyle Werenich, Ross McFadyen, Cory Naharnie	$52,000
2006	(Ontario) Glenn Howard, Richard Hart, Brent Laing, Craig Savill	(Manitoba) Don Spriggs, Dean Moxham, Barry Pugh, Dale Michie	$55,000
2007	(Ontario) Glenn Howard, Richard Hart, Brent Laing, Craig Savill	(Saskatchewan) Joel Jordison, Scott Bitz, Derek Owen, Dean Hicke	$57,000
2008	(Ontario) Glenn Howard, Richard Hart, Brent Laing, Craig Savill	(Saskatchewan) Brad Heidt, Mitch Heidt, Brennen Jones, Dustin Kidby	$58,000
2009	(Manitoba) Kerry Burtnyk, Don Walchuk, Richard Daneault, Garth Smith	(Manitoba) Jason Gunnlaugson, Justin Richter, Braden Zawada, Tyler Forrest	$58,000
2010	(Manitoba) Mike McEwen, B. J. Neufeld, Matt Wozniak, Denni Neufeld	(Manitoba) Jeff Stoughton, Jon Mead, Reid Carruthers, Steve Gould	$58,000
2011	(Manitoba) Mike McEwen, B. J. Neufeld, Matt Wozniak, Denni Neufeld	(Alberta) Kevin Koe, Pat Simmons, Chris Schille, Nolan Thiessen	$58,000
2012	(Alberta) Kevin Koe, Pat Simmons, Carter Rycroft, Nolan Thiessen	(Alberta) Kevin Martin, John Morris, Marc Kennedy, Ben Hebert	$58,000
2013	(Manitoba) Mike McEwen, B. J. Neufeld, Matt Wozniak, Denni Neufeld	(Ontario) Glenn Howard, Wayne Middaugh, Brent Laing, Craig Savill	$60,000
2014	(Manitoba) Mike McEwen, B. J. Neufeld, Matt Wozniak, Denni Neufeld	(Alberta) Kevin Koe, Marc Kennedy, Brent Laing, Ben Hebert	$60,000
2015	(Saskatchewan) Steve Laycock, Kirk Muyres, Colton Flasch, Dallan Muyres	(Alberta) Kevin Koe, Marc Kennedy, Brent Laing, Ben Hebert	$60,000
2016	(Manitoba) Reid Carruthers, Braeden Moskowy, Derek Samagalski, Colin Hodgson	(Alberta) Charley Thomas, Nathan Connolly, Brandon Klassen, D. J. Kidby	$60,000
2017	(Manitoba) Reid Carruthers, Braeden Moskowy, Derek Samagalski, Colin Hodgson	(Ontario) Glenn Howard, Scott Howard, David Mathers, Fraser Reid	$60,000
2018	(Alberta) Brendan Bottcher, Darren Moulding, Bradley Thiessen, Karrick Martin	(Alberta) Kevin Koe, B. J. Neufeld, Colton Flasch, Ben Hebert	$56,000
2019	Event cancelled due to storm		
2020	Event cancelled due to the COVID-19 pandemic		
