= 2012 SaskTel Tankard =

- Host city: Assiniboia, Saskatchewan
- Arena: Assiniboia Curling Club
- Dates: February 1–5
- Winner: Scott Manners
- Curling club: Battleford CC, Battleford
- Skip: Scott Manners
- Third: Tyler Lang
- Second: Ryan Deis
- Lead: Mike Armstrong
- Finalist: Bruce Korte

The 2012 SaskTel Tankard was held February 1–5 at the Assiniboia Curling Club in Assiniboia, Saskatchewan. The winning team of Scott Manners, will represent Saskatchewan at the 2012 Tim Hortons Brier in Saskatoon, Saskatchewan.

== Teams ==
Skip	Third	Second	Lead	Club(s)
Scott Bitz	Mark Lang	Aryn Schmidt	Dean Hicke	Callie Curling Club, Regina
Randy Bryden	Troy Robinson	Trent Knapp	Kelly Knapp	Callie Curling Club, Regina
Chris Busby (fourth)	Justin Mihalicz (skip)	Dane Roy	John Lang	Highland Curling Club, Regina
Carl deConinck Smith	Jeff Sharp	Chris Haichert	Jesse St. John	Rosetown Curling Club, Rosetown
Brent Gedak	John Aston	Derek Owens	Malcolm Vanstone	Estevan Curling Club, Estevan
Brent Goeres	Curtis Horwath	Chris Krasowski	Brad Schneider	Highland Curling Club, Regina
Mark Herbert	Rob Auckland	Matt Froehlich	Travis Gansauge	Moose Jaw Curling Club, Moose Jaw
Bruce Korte	Dean Kleiter	Roger Korte	Rob Markowsky	Nutana Curling Club, Saskatoon
Jason Krupski	Richard Sydorko	Dean Krupski	Kelly Hollinger	Whitewood Curling Club, Whitewood
Mark Lane	Scott Coghlan	Dave Zukewich	Mark Larsen	Martensville Curling Club, Martensville
Steve Laycock	Joel Jordison	Brennen Jones	Dallan Muyres	Moose Jaw Curling Club, Moose Jaw
Scott Manners	Tyler Lang	Ryan Deis	Mike Armstrong	Battleford Curling Club, Battleford
Kevin Marsh	Matt Ryback	Dan Marsh	Aaron Shutra	Nutana Curling Club, Saskatoon
Darrell McKee	Clint Dieno	Jason Jacobson	Brock Montgomery	Nutana Curling Club, Saskatoon
Braeden Moskowy	Kirk Muyres	DJ Kidby	Dustin Kidby	Callie Curling Club, Regina
Jamie Schneider	Rick Schneider	Curt England	Shannon England	Tartan Curling Club, Regina

== Draw brackets ==
=== A Event ===
Round of 16
Steve Laycock	6
Jason Krupski	3
Jamie Schneider	6
Brent Gedak	5
Scott Manners	4
Braeden Moskowy	6
Brent Goeres	6
Bruce Korte	12
Scott Bitz	8
Mark Lane	3
Darrell McKee	7
Kevin Marsh	9
Randy Bryden	8
Mark Herbert	5
Justin Mihalicz	7
Carl deConinck Smith	8

Quarter-finals
Steve Laycock	8
Jamie Schneider	9
Braeden Moskowy	7
Bruce Korte	14
Scott Bitz	8
Kevin Marsh	1
Randy Bryden	5
Carl deConinck Smith	8

Semi-finals
Jamie Schneider	5
Bruce Korte	9
Scott Bitz	6
Carl deConinck Smith	9

A Qualifier Match
Bruce Korte	5
Carl deConinck Smith	4

=== B Event ===
Round of 16
Jason Krupski	3
Brent Gedak	8
Mark Lane	4
Darrell McKee	6

Quarterfinals
Braeden Moskowy	8
Brent Gedak	9
Darrell McKee	9
Randy Bryden	8

Semifinals
Scott Bitz	8
Brent Gedak	6
Darrell McKee	8
Jamie Schneider	9

to B Qualifier Match
Scott Bitz	5
Jamie Schneider	8

Round of 16
Scott Manners	8
Brent Goeres	2
Mark Herbert	6
Justin Mihalicz	7

Quarterfinals
Steve Laycock	5
Scott Manners	9
Justin Mihalicz	8
Kevin Marsh	10

Semifinals
Scott Manners	7
Kevin Marsh	4

to B Qualifier Match
Scott Manners	8
Carl deConinck Smith	2
B Qualifier Match
Jamie Schneider	0
Scott Manners	8

=== C Event ===
Round of 16
Jason Krupski	7
Brent Goeres	4
Braeden Moskowy	4
Randy Bryden	5

Quarterfinals
Darrell McKee	4
Jason Krupski	5
Randy Bryden	8
Scott Marsh	6

Semifinals
Carl deConinck Smith	8
Jason Krupski	7
Randy Bryden	9
Scott Bitz	4

C Qualifier Match
Carl deConinck Smith	6
Randy Bryden	3

Round of 16
Mark Lane	7
Mark Herbert	6

Quarterfinals
Brent Gedak	8
Mark Lane	6
Steve Laycock	4
Justin Mihalicz	8

Semifinals
Brent Gedak	7
Justin Mihalicz	5

C Qualifier Match
Brent Gedak	8
Jamie Schneider	11

== Playoffs ==
Page playoff system
A	Bruce Korte	6
B	Scott Manners	7
C1	Carl deConinck Smith	3
C2	Jamie Schneider	10

Semifinal
A	Bruce Korte	9
C2	Jamie Schneider	7

Final
B	Scott Manners	6
A	Bruce Korte	5

=== A vs. B ===
February 4, 7:00 p.m.

Team	1	2	3	4	5	6	7	8	9	10	11	Final
Korte 🔨	1	0	0	1	0	2	0	1	0	1	0	6
Manners	0	0	1	0	2	0	1	0	2	0	1	7

=== C1 vs. C2 ===
February 4, 7:00 p.m.

Team	1	2	3	4	5	6	7	8	9	10	Final
deConinck Smith 🔨	1	0	0	2	0	0	X	X	X	X	3
Schneider	0	1	4	0	4	1	X	X	X	X	10

=== Semi-final ===
February 5, 9:30 a.m.

Team	1	2	3	4	5	6	7	8	9	10	Final
Korte 🔨	3	0	0	1	1	0	0	4	0	X	9
Schneider	0	0	2	0	0	2	1	0	2	X	7

=== Final ===
February 5, 2:00 p.m.

Sheet C	1	2	3	4	5	6	7	8	9	10	11	Final
Manners 🔨	0	0	0	2	0	1	0	0	1	1	1	6
Korte	0	1	1	0	2	0	0	1	0	0	0	5

2012 SaskTel Tankard

Scott Manners
Saskatchewan Provincial Championship title
