= Direct Horizontal Drilling Fall Classic =

Location in Canada

The Direct Horizontal Drilling Fall Classic was an annual bonspiel, or curling tournament, that took place at the Crestwood Curling Club in Edmonton, Alberta. The tournament was held in a triple knockout format. The tournament started in 2013 as part of the World Curling Tour and was last held in 2017.

== Past champions ==
Year	Winning team	Runner up team	Purse (CAD)	Winners share (CAD)
2013	(Alberta) Kevin Martin, David Nedohin, Marc Kennedy, Ben Hebert	(Saskatchewan) Brock Virtue, Braeden Moskowy, Chris Schille, D. J. Kidby	$50,000	$13,000
2014	(Alberta) Kevin Koe, Marc Kennedy, Brent Laing, Ben Hebert	(Saskatchewan) Steve Laycock, Kirk Muyres, Colton Flasch, Dallan Muyres	$50,000	$12,000
2015	(Alberta) Kevin Koe, Marc Kennedy, Brent Laing, Ben Hebert	(Alberta) Brendan Bottcher, Tom Appelman, Bradley Thiessen, Karrick Martin	$50,000	$12,000
2016	(Saskatchewan) Steve Laycock, Kirk Muyres, Colton Flasch, Dallan Muyres	(Manitoba) Reid Carruthers, Braeden Moskowy, Derek Samagalski, Colin Hodgson	$50,000	$12,000
2017	(China) Liu Rui, Xu Xiaoming, Jiang Dongxu, Zang Jialiang	(Alberta) Kevin Koe, Marc Kennedy, Brent Laing, Ben Hebert	$50,000	$12,000
2018	cancelled			
