= 2013 SaskTel Tankard =

- Host city: Melfort, Saskatchewan
- Arena: Northern Lights Palace
- Dates: January 30 – February 3
- Winner: Brock Virtue
- Curling club: Callie CC, Regina
- Skip: Brock Virtue
- Third: Braeden Moskowy
- Second: Chris Schille
- Lead: D. J. Kidby
- Finalist: Bruce Korte

The 2013 SaskTel Tankard will be held from January 30 to February 3 at the Northern Lights Palace in Melfort, Saskatchewan. The winning team represented Saskatchewan at the 2013 Tim Hortons Brier in Edmonton, Alberta.

== Qualification ==
Qualification method	Berths	Qualifying team
SaskTour Players Championship	1	Darrell McKee
CTRS ranking as of Dec. 17	2	Steve Laycock; Randy Bryden
Saskatchewan Curling Tour ranking	2	Bruce Korte; Jamie Schneider
Northern Playdown (Jan. 17–20)	5	Kevin Marsh; Josh Heidt; Brad Heidt; Michael Carss; Randy Woytowich
Southern Playdown (Jan. 17–20)	5	William Coutts; Brock Virtue; Jeff Hartung; Chris Busby; Brent Gedak
Wildcard Team	1	Max Kirkpatrick

== Teams ==
The teams are listed as follows:

Skip	Third	Second	Lead	Locale
Steve Laycock	Kirk Muyres	Colton Flasch	Dallan Muyres	Granite Curling Club, Saskatoon
Bruce Korte	Dean Kleiter	Roger Korte	Rob Markowsky	Nutana Curling Club, Saskatoon
Randy Bryden	Troy Robinson	Brennen Jones	Trent Knapp	Callie Curling Club, Regina
Jamie Schneider	Rick Schneider	Curt England	Shannon England	Tartan Curling Club, Regina
Darrell McKee	Warren Jackson	Tony Korol	Rory Golanowski	Nutana Curling Club, Saskatoon
Kevin Marsh	Matthew Ryback	Dan Marsh	Aaron Shutra	Nutana Curling Club, Saskatoon
Brad Heidt	Drew Heidt	Mitch Heidt	Glen Heitt	Unity Curling Club, Unity
Brock Virtue	Braeden Moskowy	Chris Schille	D. J. Kidby	Callie Curling Club, Regina
Josh Heidt	Brock Montgomery	Matt Lang	Dustin Kidby	Kerrobert Curling Club, Kerrobert
Jeff Hartung	Kody Hartung	Tyler Hartung	Claire DeCock	Langenburg Curling Club, Langenburg
Justin Mihalicz	Chris Busby	Kyle George	John Lang	Highland Curling Club, Regina
Brent Gedak	John Aston	Derek Owens	Malcolm Vanstone	Estevan Curling Club, Estevan
Maxwell Kirkpatrick	Shaun Meachem	Jeff Chambers	Shawn Hebert	Swift Current Curling Club, Swift Current
William Coutts	Stuart Coutts	Dean Clark	Todd Bakken	Highland Curling Club, Regina
Randy Woytowich	Cory Spanier	Lionel Holm	Dustin Kalthoff	Nutana Curling Club, Saskatoon
Michael Carss	Rob Spinney	Lyndon Holm	Tyler Matheson	Sutherland Curling Club, Saskatoon

== Knockout Draw Brackets ==
=== A Event ===
First Knockout
Steve Laycock	6
Michael Carss	5
Josh Heidt	6
Brock Virtue	5
Brent Gedak	9
Darrell McKee	8
Max Kirkpatrick	8
Jamie Schneider	11
Randy Bryden	5
William Coutts	4
Justin Mihalicz	2
Kevin Marsh	7
Jeff Hartung	9
Brad Heidt	8
Randy Woytowich	7
Bruce Korte	8

Quarterfinals
Steve Laycock	5
Josh Heidt	8
Brent Gedak	8
Jamie Schneider	7
Randy Bryden	8
Kevin Marsh	4
Jeff Hartung	6
Bruce Korte	7

Semifinals
Josh Heidt	7
Brent Gedak	4
Randy Bryden	5
Bruce Korte	6

Qualifier 1
Josh Heidt	8
Bruce Korte	11

=== B Event ===
Second Knockout
Brock Virtue	7
Michael Carss	3
Justin Mihalicz	7
William Coutts	4

Quarterfinals
Jamie Schneider	7
Brock Virtue	8
Justin Mihalicz	5
Jeff Hartung	8

Semifinals
Brock Virtue	4
Randy Bryden	2
Jeff Hartung	7
Brent Gedak	11

To Qualifier 2
Brock Virtue	8
Brent Gedak	3
Qualifier 2
Brock Virtue	5
Josh Heidt	3

Second Knockout
Max Kirkpatrick	6
Darrell McKee	2
Brad Heidt	9
Randy Woytowich	3

Quarterfinals
Max Kirkpatrick	5
Steve Laycock	7
Kevin Marsh	3
Brad Heidt	5

Semifinals
Steve Laycock	3
Brad Heidt	10

To Qualifier 2
Josh Heidt	5
Brad Heidt	4

=== C Event ===
Third Knockout
Darrell McKee	10
Michael Carss	2
Jamie Schneider	7
Justin Mihalicz	10

Quarterfinals
Darrell McKee	8
Jeff Hartung	4
Justin Mihalicz	7
Steve Laycock	9

Semifinals
Darrell McKee	4
Brad Heidt	7
Steve Laycock	9
Brent Gedak	1

Qualifier 3
Brad Heidt	6
Steve Laycock	7

Third Knockout
Randy Woytowich	7
William Coutts	6

Quarterfinals
Randy Bryden	8
Randy Woytowich	4
Max Kirkpatrick	5
Kevin Marsh	10

Semifinals
Randy Bryden	3
Kevin Marsh	6

Qualifier 4
Kevin Marsh	8
Josh Heidt	7

== Playoffs ==
Page playoff system
A	Bruce Korte	6
B	Brock Virtue	4
C1	Steve Laycock	5
C2	Kevin Marsh	8

Semifinal
B	Brock Virtue	8
C2	Kevin Marsh	6

Final
A	Bruce Korte	4
B	Brock Virtue	6

=== A vs. B ===
Saturday, February 2, 7:00 pm

Team	1	2	3	4	5	6	7	8	9	10	Final
Bruce Korte 🔨	1	0	1	1	0	1	0	2	0	X	6
Brock Virtue	0	0	0	0	1	0	1	0	2	X	4

=== C1 vs. C2 ===
Saturday, February 2, 7:00 pm

Team	1	2	3	4	5	6	7	8	9	10	Final
Steve Laycock	1	0	0	2	0	1	0	0	1	0	5
Kevin Marsh 🔨	0	1	0	0	3	0	3	0	0	1	8

=== Semifinal ===
Sunday, February 3, 9:30 am

Team	1	2	3	4	5	6	7	8	9	10	Final
Brock Virtue	0	0	2	1	0	2	0	0	3	X	8
Kevin Marsh 🔨	0	3	0	0	2	0	0	1	0	X	6

=== Final ===
Sunday, February 3, 2:00 pm

Sheet 2	1	2	3	4	5	6	7	8	9	10	Final
Bruce Korte 🔨	1	0	0	2	0	0	0	0	1	X	4
Brock Virtue	0	0	2	0	0	2	2	0	0	X	6
