= 2018 SaskTel Tankard =

- Host city: Estevan, Saskatchewan
- Arena: Affinty Place
- Dates: January 31-February 4
- Winner: Steve Laycock
- Curling club: Nutana Curling Club
- Skip: Steve Laycock
- Fourth: Matt Dunstone
- Second: Kirk Muyres
- Lead: Dallan Muyres
- Finalist: Colton Flasch

The 2018 SaskTel Tankard, the provincial men's curling championship for Saskatchewan, was held from January 31-February 4 at the Affinty Place in Estevan, Saskatchewan The winning Steve Laycock team represented Saskatchewan at the 2018 Tim Hortons Brier in Regina, Saskatchewan.

== Teams ==
The teams are listed as follows:

Skip	Third	Second	Lead	Locale(s)
Scott Bitz	Warren Jackson	Aryn Shimidt	Rory Golanowski	Sutherland Curling Club, Saskatoon
Daniel Selke	Garrett Springer	Drew Springer	Jake Rippingler	Callie Curling Club, Regina
Brayden Stewart	Jared Latos	Evan Latos	Brody Blackwell	Sutherland Curling Club, Saskatoon
Randy Bryden	Troy Robinson	John Aston	Malcolm Vanstone	Callie Curling Club, Regina
Adam Casey	Brock Montgomery	Shaun Meachem	Dustin Kidby	Highland Curling Club, Regina
Jeff Hartung	Jason Krupski	Mat Ring	Brandon Lieppi	Langenburg Curling Club, Langenburg
Carl deConinck Smith	Jeff Sharp	Brady Scharback	Mark Larsen	Rosetown Curling Club, Rosetown
Ryan Deis	Scott Manners	Jason Barnhart	Kalin Deis	Fox Valley Curling Club, Fox Valley
Brent Gedak	Clint Dieno	Derek Owens	Shawn Meyer	Estevan Power Dodge Curling Centre, Estevan
Kody Hartung	Josh Heidt (Skip)	Tyler Hartung	Kelly Knapp	Kerrobert Curling Club, Kerrobert
Aaron Shutra	Justin Heather	Jayden Schwaga	Rob Marsh	Nutana Curling Club, Saskatoon
Brock Virtue	Drew Heidt	Mitch Heidt	Jesse St.John	Kerrobert Curling Club, Kerrobert
Jason Jacobson	Jake Hersikorn	Quinn Hersikorn	Nick Neufeld	Nutana Curling Club, Saskatoon
Colton Flasch	Kevin Marsh	Dan Marsh	Trent Knapp	Nutana Curling Club, Saskatoon
Matt Dunstone	Steve Laycock (skip)	Kirk Muyres	Dallan Muyres	Nutana Curling Club, Saskatoon
Brady Kendel	Anthony Neufeld	Cole Tenetuik	Chadd McKenzie	Sutherland Curling Club, Saskatoon

== Knockout Draw Brackets ==
=== A Event ===
First Knockout
Steve Laycock	8
Aaron Shutra	3
Jason Jacobson	7
Ryan Deis	3
Jeff Hartung	1
Brent Gedak	5
Josh Heidt	2
Brady Kendel	3
Brayden Stewart	3
Colton Flasch	8
Randy Bryden	6
Brock Virtue	10
Carl deConinck Smith	2
Scott Bitz	9
Daniel Selke	7
Adam Casey	8

Quarterfinals
Steve Laycock	8
Jason Jacobson	3
Brent Gedak	4
Brady Kendel	10
Colton Flasch	10
Brock Virtue	4
Scott Bitz	9
Adam Casey	8

Semifinals
Steve Laycock	7
Brady Kendel	8
Colton Flasch	9
Scott Bitz	6

Qualifier 1
Brady Kendel	3
Colton Flasch	4

=== B Event ===
Second Knockout
Aaron Shutra	2
Ryan Deis	12
Randy Bryden	8
Brayden Stewart	4

Quarterfinals
Brent Gedak	4
Ryan Deis	8
Adam Casey	12
Randy Bryden	6

Semifinals
Ryan Deis	6
Scott Bitz	7
Steve Laycock	9
Adam Casey	2

To Qualifier 2
Scott Bitz	2
Steve Laycock	7
Qualifier 2
Steve Laycock	7
Brock Virtue	8

Second Knockout
Josh Heidt	7
Jeff Hartung	2
Carl deConinck Smith	8
Daniel Selke	3

Quarterfinals
Jason Jacobson	7
Josh Heidt	6
Brock Virtue	7
Carl deConick Smith	3

Semifinals
Jason Jacobson	4
Brock Virtue	5

To Qualifier 2
Brock Virtue	6
Brady Kendel	4

=== C Event ===
Third Knockout
Aaron Shutra	3
Jeff Hartung	8
Brent Gedak	7
Randy Bryden	5

Quarterfinals
Jeff Hartung	2
Adam Casey	7
Brent Gedak	7
Jason Jacobson	4

Semifinals
Adam Casey	7
Brady Kendel	9
Brent Gedak	5
Scott Bitz	7

Qualifier 3
Brady Kendel	5
Scott Bitz	7

Third Knockout
Brayden Stewart	5
Daniel Selke	9

Quarterfinals
Daniel Selke	4
Ryan Deis	10
Carl deConinck Smith	5
Josh Heidt	4

Semifinals
Ryan Deis	3
Carl deConinck Smith	2

Qualifier 4
Steve Laycock	8
Ryan Deis	1

== Playoffs ==
Page playoff system
A	Colton Flasch	7
B	Brock Virtue	1
C1	Scott Bitz	2
C2	Steve Laycock	8

Semifinal
B	Brock Virtue	3
C2	Steve Laycock	7

Final
A	Colton Flasch	7
C2	Steve Laycock	9

=== A vs. B ===
February 3, 7:00pm

Team	1	2	3	4	5	6	7	8	9	10	Final
Colton Flasch 🔨	0	1	0	0	3	0	3	X	X	X	7
Brock Virtue	0	0	0	0	0	1	0	X	X	X	1

=== C1 vs. C2 ===
February 3, 7:00pm

Team	1	2	3	4	5	6	7	8	9	10	Final
Scott Bitz 🔨	0	0	0	0	0	2	0	0	X	X	2
Steve Laycock	0	1	2	1	2	0	1	1	X	X	8

=== Semifinal ===
February 4, 9:30am

Team	1	2	3	4	5	6	7	8	9	10	Final
Brock Virtue	0	1	0	1	1	0	0	0	X	X	3
Steve Laycock 🔨	2	0	2	0	0	2	0	1	X	X	7

=== Final ===
February 4, 2:30pm

Team	1	2	3	4	5	6	7	8	9	10	Final
Colton Flasch 🔨	0	2	0	0	0	1	0	2	2	0	7
Steve Laycock	1	0	0	0	5	0	2	0	0	1	9

2018 SaskTel Tankard

Steve Laycock
7th Saskatchewan Provincial Championship title
