= Estevan Curling Classic =

Location in Canada

The Estevan Power Dodge Curling Classic (formerly the Weatherford Curling Classic) is an annual bonspiel that was on the men's World Curling Tour from 2013 to 2016 and is now just a part of the Saskatchewan Curling Tour. It is held annually in November at the Estevan Curling Club in Estevan, Saskatchewan.

The purse for the event is $7,000.

== Past champions ==
Year	Winning team	Runner up team	Purse (CAD)	Winner's share
2013	(China) Liu Rui, Zang Jialiang, Xu Xiaoming, Ba Dexin	(Saskatchewan) Bruce Korte, Dean Kleiter, Roger Korte, Rob Markowsky	$32,000	$10,000
2014	(Saskatchewan) Steve Laycock, Kirk Muyres, Colton Flasch, Dallan Muyres	(British Columbia) Brent Pierce, Jeff Richard, Tyler Orme, David Harper	$32,000	$10,000
2015	(Saskatchewan) Josh Heidt, Brock Montgomery, Matt Ryback, Dustin Kidby	(Manitoba) William Lyburn, Jason Gunnlaugson, Richard Daneault, Braden Zawada	$32,000	$10,000
2016	(Saskatchewan) Randy Bryden, Troy Robinson, Brock Montgomery, Trent Knapp	(Saskatchewan) Bruce Korte, Kevin Marsh, Daniel Marsh, Matt Lang	$28,000	$10,000
2017	(Saskatchewan) Scott Bitz, Warren Jackson, Aryn Schmidt, Rory Golanowski	(Saskatchewan) Randy Bryden, Troy Robinson, John Aston, Malcolm Vanstone	$7,000	$,2000
