= Muyres =

Muyres is a surname. Notable people with the surname include:

- Dallan Muyres (born 1987), Canadian curler
- Kirk Muyres (born 1990), Canadian curler
