= 2026 SaskTel Tankard =

Canadian provincial men's curling championship

- Host city: Melville, Saskatchewan
- Arena: CN Community Centre
- Dates: January 5–11
- Winner: Team Knapp
- Curling club: Highland CC, Regina
- Skip: Kelly Knapp
- Third: Brennen Jones
- Second: Dustin Kidby
- Lead: Mat Ring
- Alternate: Trent Knapp
- Coach: Brian McCusker
- Finalist: Rylan Kleiter

The 2026 SaskTel Tankard, the provincial men's curling championship for Saskatchewan, was held from January 5 to 11 at the CN Community Centre in Melville, Saskatchewan. The winning Kelly Knapp rink represented Saskatchewan at the 2026 Montana's Brier in St. John's, Newfoundland and Labrador. The event was held in conjunction with the 2026 Bunge Prairie Pinnacle, the provincial women's championship.

Having finished third on the CTRS standings for the 2024–25 season, Team Mike McEwen earned an automatic berth at the national championship. This meant Saskatchewan would qualify two teams for the Brier.

== Qualification process ==
Qualification method	Berths	Qualifying teams
SaskCTRS Leaders	3	Kelly Knapp; Carl deConinck Smith; Steve Laycock
CTRS Leaders	3	Dustin Kalthoff; Rylan Kleiter; Brad Moser
Last Chance Qualifier	3	Josh Bryden; Tyler Hartung; Michael Carss

== Teams ==
The teams are listed as follows:

Skip	Third	Second	Lead	Alternate	Coach	Club
Josh Bryden	Adam Bukurak	Carter Williamson	Ayden Whittmire			Callie CC, Regina
Michael Carss	James Hom	Jared Tessier	Lyndon Holm			Nutana CC, Saskatoon
Carl deConinck Smith	Ryan Deis	Dustin Mikush	Kalin Deis			Fox Valley CC, Fox Valley
Tyler Hartung	Matt Lang	Jayden Shwaga	Kody Hartung	Mark Lang		Langenburg CC, Langenburg
Dustin Kalthoff (Fourth)	Brent Pierce (Skip) (Note: Brent Pierce skipped Team Kalthoff.)	Josh Heidt	Logan Ede	Jason Jacobson		Nutana CC, Saskatoon
Rylan Kleiter	Matthew Hall	Joshua Mattern	Trevor Johnson		Dean Kleiter	Nutana CC, Saskatoon
Kelly Knapp	Brennen Jones	Dustin Kidby	Mat Ring	Trent Knapp	Brian McCusker	Highland CC, Regina
Steve Laycock (Fourth)	Shaun Meachem (Skip) (Note: Shaun Meachem skipped Team Laycock.)	Chris Haichert	Brayden Grindheim	Austin Krupski		Swift Current CC, Swift Current
Brad Moser	Bryden Tessier	David Baum	Cody Sutherland	Darren Camm		Nutana CC, Saskatoon

== Round robin standings ==
Final Round Robin Standings

Key
Teams to Playoffs

Skip	W	L	W–L	PF	PA	EW	EL	BE	SE
Rylan Kleiter	8	0	–	63	38	38	28	4	10
Kelly Knapp	7	1	–	65	38	32	27	3	10
Team Laycock	6	2	–	62	53	33	38	1	8
Tyler Hartung	3	5	2–1	48	47	36	28	8	11
Carl deConinck Smith	3	5	2–1	51	62	34	35	2	7
Brad Moser	3	5	1–2	40	53	25	38	8	3
Josh Bryden	3	5	1–2	47	47	34	27	8	15
Team Kalthoff	2	6	–	49	64	32	37	3	8
Michael Carss	1	7	–	35	58	28	34	0	11

== Round robin results ==
All draw times listed in Central Time (UTC−06:00).

=== Draw 1 ===
Monday, January 5, 2:00 pm

Sheet 1	1	2	3	4	5	6	7	8	9	10	Final
Brad Moser 🔨	0	0	2	0	2	0	0	2	0	1	7
Josh Bryden	0	1	0	1	0	1	1	0	2	0	6

Sheet 2	1	2	3	4	5	6	7	8	9	10	11	Final
Carl deConinck Smith 🔨	4	0	0	1	0	3	0	1	0	2	0	11
Team Kalthoff	0	2	2	0	2	0	2	0	3	0	3	14

Sheet 3	1	2	3	4	5	6	7	8	9	10	Final
Kelly Knapp	1	0	0	2	2	1	0	4	X	X	10
Michael Carss 🔨	0	1	1	0	0	0	2	0	X	X	4

Sheet 4	1	2	3	4	5	6	7	8	9	10	Final
Team Laycock	0	2	0	3	0	3	0	0	0	0	8
Rylan Kleiter 🔨	1	0	3	0	3	0	1	1	1	2	12

=== Draw 2 ===
Tuesday, January 6, 8:00 am

Sheet 1	1	2	3	4	5	6	7	8	9	10	Final
Rylan Kleiter 🔨	0	1	0	2	0	2	0	2	0	0	7
Tyler Hartung	0	0	1	0	1	0	2	0	1	1	6

Sheet 2	1	2	3	4	5	6	7	8	9	10	Final
Kelly Knapp	0	3	0	2	0	1	1	0	3	X	10
Team Laycock 🔨	1	0	2	0	0	0	0	3	0	X	6

Sheet 3	1	2	3	4	5	6	7	8	9	10	Final
Carl deConinck Smith 🔨	0	2	0	0	1	0	0	2	1	0	6
Josh Bryden	0	0	2	1	0	1	3	0	0	3	10

Sheet 4	1	2	3	4	5	6	7	8	9	10	11	Final
Team Kalthoff 🔨	0	2	0	1	1	1	0	0	1	0	0	6
Brad Moser	0	0	2	0	0	0	2	1	0	1	1	7

=== Draw 3 ===
Tuesday, January 6, 4:00 pm

Sheet 1	1	2	3	4	5	6	7	8	9	10	Final
Carl deConinck Smith 🔨	0	1	0	1	0	1	0	2	X	X	5
Kelly Knapp	1	0	2	0	2	0	4	0	X	X	9

Sheet 2	1	2	3	4	5	6	7	8	9	10	Final
Josh Bryden	0	0	0	0	0	2	0	1	0	X	3
Rylan Kleiter 🔨	2	0	1	0	0	0	2	0	3	X	8

Sheet 3	1	2	3	4	5	6	7	8	9	10	Final
Team Laycock	0	0	0	1	1	1	1	0	2	X	6
Brad Moser 🔨	0	0	1	0	0	0	0	1	0	X	2

Sheet 4	1	2	3	4	5	6	7	8	9	10	Final
Michael Carss	0	0	1	0	2	0	0	0	0	X	3
Tyler Hartung 🔨	0	3	0	0	0	1	1	2	1	X	8

=== Draw 4 ===
Wednesday, January 7, 9:00 am

Sheet 1	1	2	3	4	5	6	7	8	9	10	Final
Josh Bryden 🔨	1	0	0	0	1	1	0	1	0	X	4
Team Laycock	0	3	1	1	0	0	1	0	1	X	7

Sheet 2	1	2	3	4	5	6	7	8	9	10	Final
Brad Moser 🔨	4	0	1	0	0	0	0	2	0	X	7
Michael Carss	0	1	0	1	0	0	1	0	2	X	5

Sheet 3	1	2	3	4	5	6	7	8	9	10	Final
Tyler Hartung 🔨	1	0	0	0	1	0	1	0	0	X	3
Team Kalthoff	0	2	1	1	0	2	0	1	3	X	10

Sheet 4	1	2	3	4	5	6	7	8	9	10	Final
Rylan Kleiter 🔨	0	2	0	0	1	0	1	0	0	1	5
Kelly Knapp	0	0	0	1	0	1	0	1	1	0	4

=== Draw 5 ===
Wednesday, January 7, 7:00 pm

Sheet 1	1	2	3	4	5	6	7	8	9	10	Final
Team Kalthoff	0	0	0	1	0	0	0	0	X	X	1
Michael Carss 🔨	2	0	1	0	2	1	1	2	X	X	9

Sheet 2	1	2	3	4	5	6	7	8	9	10	11	Final
Team Laycock	0	2	0	2	0	4	0	1	0	0	1	10
Tyler Hartung 🔨	1	0	2	0	3	0	1	0	1	1	0	9

Sheet 3	1	2	3	4	5	6	7	8	9	10	Final
Josh Bryden 🔨	0	0	0	1	1	1	0	2	1	X	6
Kelly Knapp	0	1	5	0	0	0	2	0	0	X	8

Sheet 4	1	2	3	4	5	6	7	8	9	10	Final
Brad Moser	0	0	1	0	2	0	1	0	0	X	4
Carl deConinck Smith 🔨	1	0	0	1	0	1	0	3	1	X	7

=== Draw 6 ===
Thursday, January 8, 12:00 pm

Sheet 1	1	2	3	4	5	6	7	8	9	10	Final
Kelly Knapp 🔨	3	0	0	2	0	4	X	X	X	X	9
Brad Moser	0	0	1	0	1	0	X	X	X	X	2

Sheet 2	1	2	3	4	5	6	7	8	9	10	Final
Michael Carss	0	0	1	0	0	1	0	1	1	X	4
Carl deConinck Smith 🔨	2	1	0	2	1	0	1	0	0	X	7

Sheet 3	1	2	3	4	5	6	7	8	9	10	Final
Team Kalthoff 🔨	1	0	1	0	0	1	0	1	0	X	4
Rylan Kleiter	0	2	0	2	1	0	1	0	1	X	7

Sheet 4	1	2	3	4	5	6	7	8	9	10	Final
Tyler Hartung 🔨	2	2	0	2	2	0	X	X	X	X	8
Josh Bryden	0	0	1	0	0	1	X	X	X	X	2

=== Draw 7 ===
Thursday, January 8, 8:00 pm

Sheet 1	1	2	3	4	5	6	7	8	9	10	Final
Michael Carss	0	0	1	0	2	0	1	0	0	X	4
Rylan Kleiter 🔨	0	2	0	2	0	2	0	1	1	X	8

Sheet 2	1	2	3	4	5	6	7	8	9	10	Final
Team Kalthoff	0	0	1	0	0	0	1	0	0	0	2
Josh Bryden 🔨	0	0	0	1	1	1	0	0	1	4	8

Sheet 3	1	2	3	4	5	6	7	8	9	10	Final
Brad Moser	0	0	0	0	4	0	0	1	0	0	5
Tyler Hartung 🔨	0	1	1	1	0	1	0	0	1	1	6

Sheet 4	1	2	3	4	5	6	7	8	9	10	Final
Carl deConinck Smith	0	0	0	2	1	1	0	0	2	0	6
Team Laycock 🔨	1	0	1	0	0	0	3	2	0	1	8

=== Draw 8 ===
Friday, January 9, 2:00 pm

Sheet 1	1	2	3	4	5	6	7	8	9	10	11	Final
Tyler Hartung 🔨	1	0	0	0	0	2	0	1	0	1	0	5
Carl deConinck Smith	0	2	0	0	0	0	1	0	2	0	1	6

Sheet 2	1	2	3	4	5	6	7	8	9	10	Final
Rylan Kleiter 🔨	2	0	2	0	0	0	1	1	0	2	8
Brad Moser	0	1	0	1	0	2	0	0	2	0	6

Sheet 3	1	2	3	4	5	6	7	8	9	10	Final
Michael Carss	1	0	0	1	1	1	0	1	0	X	5
Team Laycock 🔨	0	3	1	0	0	0	4	0	1	X	9

Sheet 4	1	2	3	4	5	6	7	8	9	10	Final
Kelly Knapp 🔨	3	1	0	2	0	2	0	3	X	X	11
Team Kalthoff	0	0	2	0	2	0	3	0	X	X	7

=== Draw 9 ===
Saturday, January 10, 9:00 am

Sheet 1	1	2	3	4	5	6	7	8	9	10	Final
Team Laycock	0	0	2	0	5	0	0	1	0	X	8
Team Kalthoff 🔨	1	1	0	1	0	0	1	0	1	X	5

Sheet 2	1	2	3	4	5	6	7	8	9	10	Final
Tyler Hartung 🔨	0	0	1	0	1	0	0	0	1	0	3
Kelly Knapp	0	0	0	1	0	0	0	2	0	1	4

Sheet 3	1	2	3	4	5	6	7	8	9	10	Final
Rylan Kleiter	2	0	4	1	1	0	0	X	X	X	8
Carl deConinck Smith 🔨	0	1	0	0	0	1	1	X	X	X	3

Sheet 4	1	2	3	4	5	6	7	8	9	10	Final
Josh Bryden 🔨	0	2	1	2	1	1	0	1	X	X	8
Michael Carss	0	0	0	0	0	0	1	0	X	X	1

== Playoffs ==
Page playoff system
1	Rylan Kleiter	5
2	Kelly Knapp	6
3	Team Laycock	11
4	Tyler Hartung	1

Semifinal
1	Rylan Kleiter	9
3	Team Laycock	5

Final
2	Kelly Knapp	9
1	Rylan Kleiter	4

=== 1 vs. 2 ===
Saturday, January 10, 7:00 pm

Sheet 2	1	2	3	4	5	6	7	8	9	10	11	Final
Rylan Kleiter 🔨	0	0	0	0	1	0	1	0	1	2	0	5
Kelly Knapp	0	0	1	2	0	1	0	1	0	0	1	6

=== 3 vs. 4 ===
Saturday, January 10, 7:00 pm

Sheet 3	1	2	3	4	5	6	7	8	9	10	Final
Team Laycock 🔨	3	1	0	5	2	X	X	X	X	X	11
Tyler Hartung	0	0	1	0	0	X	X	X	X	X	1

=== Semifinal ===
Sunday, January 11, 9:00 am

Sheet 3	1	2	3	4	5	6	7	8	9	10	Final
Rylan Kleiter 🔨	3	0	1	0	0	2	1	0	2	X	9
Team Laycock	0	2	0	1	1	0	0	1	0	X	5

=== Final ===
Sunday, January 11, 7:00 pm

Sheet 2	1	2	3	4	5	6	7	8	9	10	Final
Kelly Knapp 🔨	0	1	0	1	0	0	2	0	2	3	9
Rylan Kleiter	0	0	1	0	0	2	0	1	0	0	4

2026 SaskTel Tankard

Kelly Knapp
2nd Saskatchewan Provincial Championship title
