= 2010 SaskTel Tankard =

- Host city: Lumsden, Saskatchewan
- Arena: Lumsden Sports Centre
- Dates: February 10-14
- Winner: Darrell McKee
- Curling club: Nutana CC, Saskatoon, SK
- Skip: Darrell McKee
- Third: Bruce Korte
- Second: Roger Korte
- Lead: Rob Markowsky
- Finalist: Joel Jordison

The 2010 SaskTel Tankard was held February 10–14 at the Lumsden Sports Centre in Lumsden, Saskatchewan.

Saskatoon's Darrell McKee won his third provincial title, defeating Moose Jaw's Joel Jordison 7-5 in the final.

== Teams ==
Skip	Third	Second	Lead	City (club)
Jason Ackerman	Ryan Sveinbjornson	Andrew Foreman	Curtis Horwath	Regina; Tartan Curling Club
Randy Bryden	Troy Robinson	Russ Bryden	Kerry Gudereit	Regina; Caledonian Curling Club
Carl deConinck Smith	Chris Haichert	Dane Roy	Jesse St. John	Eston; Eston Curling Club
Darren Engel	Ryan Deis	Jason Barnhart	Drew Wilby	Fox Valley; Fox Valley Curling Club
Josh Heidt	Kirk Muyres	Regis Neumeier	Shayne Hannon	Kerrobert; Kerrobert Curling Club
Mark Herbert	Robert Auckland	Chad Jones	Travis Gansauge	Moose Jaw; Bushell Park Curling Club
Dallan Muyres	Matt Ryback	Dan Marsh	Aaron Shutra	Humboldt; Humboldt Curling Club
Brennen Jones	Byron Moffatt	Scott Comfort	Steve Moulding	Regina; Tartan Curling Club
Joel Jordison	Scott Bitz	Aaron Schmidt	Dean Hicke	Moose Jaw; Bushell Park Curling Club
Ian Mayoh	Neil Vaughan	Arnold Crawford	Dale Bruce	Debden; Debden Curling Club
Darrell McKee	Bruce Korte	Roger Korte	Rob Markowsky	Saskatoon; Nutana Curling Club
Dean Moulding	Bert Martin	Ray Morgan	Darwin Williamson	Regina; Callie Curling Club
Al Schick	William Coutts	Stuart Coutts	Nathan Grudnizki	Regina; Highland Curling Club
Jamie Schneider	Rick Schneider	Curt England	Shannon England	Regina; Tartan Curling Club
Pat Simmons	Gerry Adam	Jeff Sharp	Steve Laycock	Davidson; Davidson Curling Club
Denis Sunderland	Ray Moisan	Steven Thevenot	Rob Voldeng	Naicam; Naicam Curling Club

== Draw ==
=== A Event ===
First Knockout
Sunderland	3
Simmons	9
Ackerman	7
Herbert	9
Jones	1
Bryden	7
Heidt	3
Schick	9
Muyres	7
Jordison	8
Engel	3
deConinck Smith	9
Schneider	3
Moulding	6
McKee	7
Mayoh	6

Quarterfinals
Herbert	8
Simmons	6
Schick	8
Bryden	9
Jordison	8
deConinck Smith	7
McKee	6
Moulding	4

Semifinals
Herbert	4
Bryden	6
McKee	7
Jordison	4

Qualifier 1
Bryden	6
McKee	5

=== B Event ===
Round of 16
Ackerman	11
Sunderland	10
Engel	4
Muyres	6

Quarterfinals
Schick	9
Ackerman	6
Moulding	3
Muyres	8

Semifinals
Schick	4
Jordison	8
Herbert	6
Muyres	5

Finals
Jordison	7
Herbert	6

Round of 16
Jones	4
Heidt	6
Schneider	6
Mayoh	4

Quarterfinals
Heidt	3
Simmons	7
Schneider	8
deConinck Smith	6

Semifinals
Simmons	6
Schneider	8

Finals
Schneider	2
McKee	4
B Qualifier Match
McKee	2
Jordison	7

=== C Event ===
Round of 16
Jones	8
Sunderland	5
Moulding	7
Ackerman	8

Quarterfinals
Jones	3
Muyres	5
Ackerman	9
Simmons	8

Semifinals
Schneider	6
Muyres	4
Ackerman	3
Herbert	9

C Qualifier Match
Herbert	5
Schneider	4

Round of 16
Mayoh	8
Engel	2

Quarterfinals
Mayoh	4
Schick	6
deConinck Smith	7
Heidt	6

Semifinals
Schick	8
deConinck Smith	9

C Qualifier Match
McKee	5
deConinck Smith	3

== Playoffs ==
Page playoff system
A	Bryden	5
B	Jordison	6
C1	Herbert	4
C2	McKee	9

Semifinal
A	Bryden	5
C2	McKee	7

Final
B	Jordison	5
C2	McKee	7

=== Final ===
Team	1	2	3	4	5	6	7	8	9	10	Final
McKee	0	2	0	0	1	0	1	0	2	1	7
Jordison 🔨	1	0	2	0	0	1	0	1	0	0	5
