= Kirk Muyres =

Canadian curler

- Curler
- Born: June 29, 1990 (age 36); St. Gregor, Saskatchewan

Team
- Curling club: Wadena RE/MAX CC, Wadena, SK; Highland CC, Regina, SK

Curling career
- Member Association: Saskatchewan
- Brier: 7 (2014, 2015, 2016, 2018, 2019, 2021, 2022)
- World Mixed Doubles Championship: 1 (2018)
- Top CTRS ranking: 4th (2014–15)
Medal record
Doubles curling
Representing Canada
World Mixed Doubles Championship
| Bronze medal – third place | 2018 Östersund |
Men's curling
Representing Saskatchewan
Tim Hortons Brier
| Bronze medal – third place | 2015 Calgary |
| Bronze medal – third place | 2021 Calgary |
Canadian Mixed Doubles Championship
| Gold medal – first place | 2018 Leduc |
| Silver medal – second place | 2024 Fredericton |
| Bronze medal – third place | 2019 Fredericton |

Kirk Lyle Muyres (born June 29, 1990) is a Canadian curler. He is a former Canadian junior champion.

== Career ==
=== Juniors ===
As a youth, Muyres was a member of the Saskatchewan team at the 2007 Canada Winter Games, where he played 5th.

For much of his junior career, Muyres played third for the Josh Heidt rink. The team played in their first provincial men's championship in 2010 when Muyres was just 19. The team won one game in the event. After the season, Muyres left the team to play for the Braeden Moskowy rink at third. The team won the Saskatchewan Junior championships that year, earning the rink the right to represent Saskatchewan at the 2011 Canadian Junior Curling Championships. At the Canadian Juniors, the team - which also included Colton Flasch and Matt Lang - went undefeated (12-0) through the round robin, and proceeded to win the event by defeating Ontario's Mathew Camm in the final. The team would go on to represent Canada at the 2011 World Junior Curling Championships where they would find less success. The team found themselves in 4th place after the round robin with a 6-3 record. The team beat Norway (Steffen Mellemseter) in their first playoff match, but in the semi-final they lost to Switzerland (Peter de Cruz), and then lost to Norway again in the bronze medal game. After the World Juniors, the team played in their first Grand Slam event, the 2011 Players' Championship where they surprised many by making into the quarterfinals.

=== Men's ===
After juniors, Muyres and Moskowy stuck together as a team, adding D. J. Kidby and Dustin Kidby to their front-end. The team competed in many events on the World Curling Tour over the 2011-12 season, winning one event, the 2011 DEKALB Superspiel. The team also played in the 2012 provincial men's championship, where they won just one game. After the season, the team broke up, and Muyres joined the Steve Laycock rink.

In his first season with the Laycock rink, the team would play in all four Grand Slam events, making it to the semi-finals of the 2012 Masters of Curling. At the 2013 provincial men's championship, the team finished 4th. Following the season, the team had accumulated enough CTRS points to qualify for the "Road to the Roar" 2013 Canadian Olympic pre-qualifying event. At "the Roar" the following season, the team placed fourth, which was not good enough to qualify for the 2013 Canadian Olympic Curling Trials. The Laycock rink would win the 2014 SaskTel Tankard men's provincial championship, sending the team to the 2014 Tim Hortons Brier, Muyers' first. At the Brier, the team narrowly missed the playoffs, after finishing the round robin with a 6-5 record. Also at the 2014 Brier, Muyers won the Ford Hot Shots competition. That season, the team played in three slams, making it as far as the semifinals at the 2014 The National.

In the 2014–15 season, the team had much more success on the tour. The team won two events, the Weatherford Curling Classic and the US Open of Curling. They played in five slams, making to the quarterfinals in two, and all the way to the final at the 2014 Canadian Open of Curling. The team would win the 2015 SaskTel Tankard and represented Saskatchewan at the 2015 Tim Hortons Brier. There, the team would make it into the playoffs, and would go on to win the bronze medal. The next season, the team would win the Canad Inns Men's Classic, and played in all seven slams in the expanded Grand Slam tour, making it to the semifinals in two events. The team played in the 2015 Canada Cup of Curling, finishing with a 2–5 record. They won the 2016 SaskTel Tankard and would once again represent Saskatchewan at the 2016 Tim Hortons Brier. There, they missed the playoffs, going 5–6. In the 2016–17 curling season, the team again won one tour event, the Direct Horizontal Drilling Fall Classic. They played in all seven slams, making it to the semifinals at the 2016 WFG Masters. The team did not return to the Brier that season, as they would lose in the final of the 2017 SaskTel Tankard. They did play in the 2016 Canada Cup of Curling, where they lost in a tiebreaker. The next season, the team played in just two slams, making the quarterfinals at the 2017 GSOC Tour Challenge. They would play in the 2017 Canadian Olympic Curling Trials, missing the playoffs with a 2–6 record. They did win the 2018 SaskTel Tankard however, but missed the playoffs at the 2018 Tim Hortons Brier, after a 6–5 record. Following the Brier, it was announced the team would be breaking up. For the 2018–19 season, Muyres began skipping his own team consisting of Kevin Marsh, Dan Marsh and brother Dallan Muyres.

=== Mixed doubles ===
Muyres played with Laura Crocker (Walker) at the 2018 Canadian Mixed Doubles Curling Championship, filling in for her fiancé Geoff Walker, who was playing at that year's World Championships. The pair was an ultimate success, and would end up winning the event, defeating Colton Lott and Kadriana Sahaidak in the final. The pair represented Canada at the 2018 World Mixed Doubles Curling Championship, where they won a bronze medal. They also represented Canada in the first leg of the 2018 Curling World Cup in Suzhou, China, which they would end up winning, defeating the United States (Korey Dropkin and Sarah Anderson) in the final. Following the 2021-22 season, both Walker and Muyres decided to focus their careers strictly to the Mixed Doubles discipline to push for an Olympic appearance in 2026. Walker and Muyres would qualify for the 2025 Canadian Mixed Doubles Curling Olympic Trials, however would narrowly miss the playoffs, tied with Jennifer Jones and Brent Laing with each having 4–3 records after round robin play, but Jones/Laing winning the tie-breaker 9–3 in their head-to-head game.

Muyres plans on retiring from competitive curling after the 2025–26 curling season.

== Personal life ==
Muyres grew up in St. Gregor, Saskatchewan. He is the son of 1986 Saskatchewan champion Lyle Muyres, who is also the team's coach. His brother Dallan plays lead for his team. He is of German descent. He is a graduate of the University of Saskatchewan, and attended Muenster High School. He is currently a mortgage broker for Kirk Muyres Mortgages. After living in Regina, Saskatchewan, Muyres briefly lived in Ottawa, Ontario in 2022, but now lives in Humboldt, Saskatchewan. He is currently in a relationship with Swiss curler Carole Howald.

== Grand Slam record ==
Key
| C | Champion |
| F | Lost in Final |
| SF | Lost in Semifinal |
| QF | Lost in Quarterfinals |
| R16 | Lost in the round of 16 |
| Q | Did not advance to playoffs |
| T2 | Played in Tier 2 event |
| DNP | Did not participate in event |
| N/A | Not a Grand Slam event that season |

| Event | 2010–11 | 2011–12 | 2012–13 | 2013–14 | 2014–15 | 2015–16 | 2016–17 | 2017–18 | 2018–19 | 2019–20 | 2020–21 | 2021–22 |
|---|---|---|---|---|---|---|---|---|---|---|---|---|
| Elite 10 | N/A | N/A | N/A | N/A | Q | SF | Q | DNP | DNP | N/A | N/A | N/A |
| Masters | DNP | DNP | SF | DNP | QF | SF | SF | Q | DNP | Q | N/A | Q |
| Tour Challenge | N/A | N/A | N/A | N/A | N/A | Q | QF | QF | T2 | T2 | N/A | N/A |
| The National | DNP | DNP | DNP | SF | QF | Q | Q | DNP | Q | DNP | N/A | QF |
| Canadian Open | DNP | DNP | Q | Q | F | QF | QF | DNP | Q | Q | N/A | N/A |
| Players' | QF | DNP | Q | Q | Q | QF | Q | DNP | DNP | N/A | QF | Q |
| Champions Cup | N/A | N/A | N/A | N/A | N/A | QF | Q | DNP | Q | N/A | Q | DNP |
