= 2019 Masters (curling) =

Grand Slam of Curling event

- Host city: North Bay, Ontario
- Arena: North Bay Memorial Gardens
- Dates: October 22–27
- Men's winner: (Saskatchewan) Team Dunstone
- Curling club: Highland CC, Saskatoon
- Skip: Matt Dunstone
- Third: Braeden Moskowy
- Second: Catlin Schneider
- Lead: Dustin Kidby
- Finalist: (Newfoundland and Labrador) Brad Gushue
- Women's winner: (Manitoba) Team Fleury
- Curling club: East St. Paul CC, East St. Paul
- Skip: Tracy Fleury
- Third: Selena Njegovan
- Second: Liz Fyfe
- Lead: Kristin MacCuish
- Finalist: (Japan) Sayaka Yoshimura

The 2019 Masters were held from October 22 to 27, at the North Bay Memorial Gardens in North Bay, Ontario. It was the first Grand Slam and first major of the 2019–20 season.

In the Men's final, Matt Dunstone beat Brad Gushue 8–5 to win the title. It is Dunstone's first Grand Slam final appearance and victory, having only made it as far as the quarterfinals in all of his previous slams.

In the Women's final, Tracy Fleury defeated Sayaka Yoshimura 7–5 to claim the title. It was Fleury's first Grand Slam victory, having finished runner-up at two previous slams. It was also a record set by Yoshimura who is the first women's team from Asia to make a Grand Slam final, excluding defunct events.

The total attendance for the event was about 40,000, a record for any Grand Slam event.

== Qualification ==
The top 15 men's and women's teams on the World Curling Tour order of merit standings as of September 17, 2019 qualified for the event. In the event that a team declines their invitation, the next-ranked team on the order of merit is invited until the field is complete.

=== Men ===
Top Order of Merit men's teams as of September 17:

1. (Alberta) Kevin Koe
2. (Ontario) John Epping
3. (Alberta) Brendan Bottcher
4. (Sweden) Niklas Edin
5. (Scotland) Bruce Mouat
6. (Ontario) Brad Jacobs
7. (Switzerland) Peter de Cruz
8. (Scotland) Ross Paterson
9. (Newfoundland and Labrador) Brad Gushue
10. (Saskatchewan) Matt Dunstone
11. (Switzerland) Yannick Schwaller
12. (Ontario) Glenn Howard
13. (Ontario) Scott McDonald
14. (United States) John Shuster
15. (Manitoba) Mike McEwen

=== Women ===
Top Order of Merit women's teams as of September 17:

1. (Ontario) Rachel Homan
2. (Sweden) Anna Hasselborg
3. (Manitoba) Kerri Einarson
4. (Switzerland) Silvana Tirinzoni
5. (Manitoba) Jennifer Jones
6. (Alberta) Chelsea Carey
7. (Manitoba) Tracy Fleury
8. (Japan) Satsuki Fujisawa
9. (Alberta) Casey Scheidegger
10. (Saskatchewan) Robyn Silvernagle
11. (Scotland) Eve Muirhead
12. (Japan) Sayaka Yoshimura
13. (Switzerland) Elena Stern
14. (Russia) ~~Anna Sidorova~~
15. (Manitoba) Theresa Cannon
16. (Alberta) Kelsey Rocque

== Men ==
=== Teams ===
The teams are listed as follows:

Skip	Third	Second	Lead	Locale
Brendan Bottcher	Darren Moulding	Brad Thiessen	Karrick Martin	Edmonton, Alberta
Benoît Schwarz (Fourth)	Sven Michel	Peter de Cruz (Skip)	Valentin Tanner	Geneva, Switzerland
Matt Dunstone	Braeden Moskowy	Catlin Schneider	Dustin Kidby	Regina, Saskatchewan
Niklas Edin	Oskar Eriksson	Rasmus Wranå	Christoffer Sundgren	Karlstad, Sweden
John Epping	Ryan Fry	Mat Camm	Brent Laing	Toronto, Ontario
Brad Gushue	Mark Nichols	Brett Gallant	Geoff Walker	St. John's, Newfoundland and Labrador
Scott Howard	Adam Spencer (Note: Adam Spencer spared for Scott Howard on Team Howard.)	David Mathers	Tim March	Penetanguishene, Ontario
Brad Jacobs	Marc Kennedy	E. J. Harnden	Ryan Harnden	Sault Ste. Marie, Ontario
Kevin Koe	Kirk Muyres (Note: Kirk Muyres spared for B. J. Neufeld on Team Koe as Neufeld was on paternity leave.)	Colton Flasch	Ben Hebert	Calgary, Alberta
Scott McDonald	Jonathan Beuk	Wesley Forget	Scott Chadwick	Kingston, Ontario
Mike McEwen	Reid Carruthers	Derek Samagalski	Colin Hodgson	Winnipeg, Manitoba
Bruce Mouat	Grant Hardie	Bobby Lammie	Hammy McMillan Jr.	Edinburgh, Scotland
Ross Paterson	Kyle Waddell	Duncan Menzies	Michael Goodfellow	Glasgow, Scotland
Yannick Schwaller	Michael Brunner	Romano Meier	Marcel Käufeler	Bern, Switzerland
John Shuster	Chris Plys	Matt Hamilton	John Landsteiner	Duluth, United States

=== Round Robin Standings ===
Final Round Robin Standings

Key
Teams to Playoffs
Teams to Tiebreakers

Pool A	W	L	PF	PA
(Ontario) Team Howard	3	1	20	15
(Ontario) Brad Jacobs	3	1	24	16
(Alberta) Kevin Koe	2	2	22	23
(Switzerland) Peter de Cruz	2	2	18	21
(Ontario) Scott McDonald	0	4	17	26

Pool B	W	L	PF	PA
(Scotland) Bruce Mouat	4	0	34	13
(Ontario) John Epping	2	2	15	18
(Scotland) Ross Paterson	2	2	19	23
(Switzerland) Yannick Schwaller	1	3	19	27
(United States) John Shuster	1	3	17	23

Pool C	W	L	PF	PA
(Alberta) Brendan Bottcher	3	1	22	17
(Saskatchewan) Matt Dunstone	3	1	22	16
(Newfoundland and Labrador) Brad Gushue	2	2	21	15
(Sweden) Niklas Edin	1	3	15	23
(Manitoba) Mike McEwen	1	3	19	28

=== Round Robin Results ===
All draw times are listed in Eastern Daylight Time (UTC−04:00).

==== Draw 1 ====
Tuesday, October 22, 7:00 pm

Sheet C	1	2	3	4	5	6	7	8	Final
(Alberta) Brendan Bottcher 🔨	3	2	0	6	0	X	X	X	11
(Manitoba) Mike McEwen	0	0	1	0	3	X	X	X	4

Sheet D	1	2	3	4	5	6	7	8	Final
(Newfoundland and Labrador) Brad Gushue 🔨	0	1	0	1	0	0	2	0	4
(Saskatchewan) Matt Dunstone	0	0	1	0	2	1	0	1	5

==== Draw 2 ====
Wednesday, October 23, 8:00 am

Sheet B	1	2	3	4	5	6	7	8	Final
(Scotland) Bruce Mouat 🔨	3	0	2	0	3	0	3	X	11
(Switzerland) Yannick Schwaller	0	1	0	3	0	2	0	X	6

Sheet E	1	2	3	4	5	6	7	8	Final
(Switzerland) Peter de Cruz 🔨	0	0	2	0	2	0	0	3	7
(Ontario) Scott McDonald	0	0	0	2	0	2	1	0	5

==== Draw 3 ====
Wednesday, October 23, 12:00 pm

Sheet A	1	2	3	4	5	6	7	8	Final
(Sweden) Niklas Edin	0	2	0	0	2	0	0	0	4
(Manitoba) Mike McEwen 🔨	0	0	3	0	0	0	3	2	8

Sheet B	1	2	3	4	5	6	7	8	Final
(Ontario) John Epping	0	0	1	1	0	0	2	0	4
(Scotland) Ross Paterson 🔨	2	1	0	0	1	1	0	1	6

Sheet E	1	2	3	4	5	6	7	8	Final
(Alberta) Kevin Koe	0	2	0	3	0	1	2	X	8
(Ontario) Team Howard 🔨	1	0	1	0	2	0	0	X	4

==== Draw 4 ====
Wednesday, October 23, 4:00 pm

Sheet B	1	2	3	4	5	6	7	8	Final
(Ontario) Brad Jacobs 🔨	3	1	0	1	0	1	0	X	6
(Ontario) Scott McDonald	0	0	3	0	1	0	1	X	5

Sheet D	1	2	3	4	5	6	7	8	Final
(Scotland) Bruce Mouat	4	0	0	1	2	3	X	X	10
(United States) John Shuster 🔨	0	1	2	0	0	0	X	X	3

==== Draw 5 ====
Wednesday, October 23, 8:00 pm

Sheet B	1	2	3	4	5	6	7	8	Final
(Sweden) Niklas Edin 🔨	0	2	0	0	0	0	0	0	2
(Newfoundland and Labrador) Brad Gushue	0	0	2	0	1	1	1	1	6

Sheet E	1	2	3	4	5	6	7	8	Final
(Saskatchewan) Matt Dunstone 🔨	0	2	4	1	0	X	X	X	7
(Alberta) Brendan Bottcher	1	0	0	0	1	X	X	X	2

==== Draw 6 ====
Thursday, October 24, 8:00 am

Sheet A	1	2	3	4	5	6	7	8	9	Final
(Ontario) Brad Jacobs	0	0	1	0	2	0	0	1	0	4
(Ontario) Team Howard 🔨	0	2	0	1	0	1	0	0	1	5

Sheet C	1	2	3	4	5	6	7	8	Final
(Scotland) Ross Paterson	0	3	1	0	0	1	1	1	7
(Switzerland) Yannick Schwaller 🔨	2	0	0	3	0	0	0	0	5

Sheet D	1	2	3	4	5	6	7	8	Final
(Alberta) Kevin Koe 🔨	1	0	2	0	1	0	0	X	4
(Switzerland) Peter de Cruz	0	2	0	1	0	3	1	X	7

==== Draw 7 ====
Thursday, October 24, 12:00 pm

Sheet C	1	2	3	4	5	6	7	8	Final
(Ontario) John Epping	0	1	0	0	0	1	1	1	4
(United States) John Shuster 🔨	1	0	0	0	1	0	0	0	2

Sheet D	1	2	3	4	5	6	7	8	Final
(Sweden) Niklas Edin	0	0	0	0	2	0	1	0	3
(Alberta) Brendan Bottcher 🔨	1	0	1	0	0	1	0	1	4

Sheet E	1	2	3	4	5	6	7	8	Final
(Newfoundland and Labrador) Brad Gushue	0	3	0	1	0	4	X	X	8
(Manitoba) Mike McEwen 🔨	1	0	1	0	1	0	X	X	3

==== Draw 8 ====
Thursday, October 24, 4:00 pm

Sheet A	1	2	3	4	5	6	7	8	Final
(Scotland) Bruce Mouat 🔨	0	0	1	2	0	1	2	X	6
(Scotland) Ross Paterson	0	1	0	0	1	0	0	X	2

Sheet D	1	2	3	4	5	6	7	8	Final
(Ontario) Team Howard 🔨	2	1	0	1	1	0	1	X	6
(Ontario) Scott McDonald	0	0	0	0	0	2	0	X	2

==== Draw 9 ====
Thursday, October 24, 8:00 pm

Sheet A	1	2	3	4	5	6	7	8	Final
(Saskatchewan) Matt Dunstone	0	0	2	0	0	1	0	2	5
(Manitoba) Mike McEwen 🔨	0	1	0	2	0	0	1	0	4

Sheet C	1	2	3	4	5	6	7	8	Final
(Alberta) Kevin Koe	0	1	0	0	2	0	0	X	3
(Ontario) Brad Jacobs 🔨	2	0	0	1	0	0	4	X	7

==== Draw 10 ====
Friday, October 25, 8:00 am

Sheet A	1	2	3	4	5	6	7	8	Final
(Ontario) John Epping 🔨	1	1	0	0	0	1	1	1	5
(Switzerland) Yannick Schwaller	0	0	2	0	1	0	0	0	3

Sheet B	1	2	3	4	5	6	7	8	Final
(Switzerland) Peter de Cruz	0	0	0	0	1	0	0	X	1
(Ontario) Team Howard 🔨	0	0	2	0	0	1	2	X	5

Sheet D	1	2	3	4	5	6	7	8	Final
(Scotland) Ross Paterson	0	2	1	0	0	1	0	X	4
(United States) John Shuster 🔨	1	0	0	0	4	0	3	X	8

==== Draw 11 ====
Friday, October 25, 12:00 pm

Sheet A	1	2	3	4	5	6	7	8	Final
(Sweden) Niklas Edin	0	2	0	1	1	2	0	0	6
(Saskatchewan) Matt Dunstone 🔨	3	0	1	0	0	0	0	1	5

==== Draw 12 ====
Friday, October 25, 4:00 pm

Sheet A	1	2	3	4	5	6	7	8	Final
(Alberta) Kevin Koe 🔨	0	2	0	3	0	2	0	X	7
(Ontario) Scott McDonald	0	0	2	0	2	0	1	X	5

Sheet B	1	2	3	4	5	6	7	8	Final
(Ontario) John Epping	0	1	0	1	0	0	X	X	2
(Scotland) Bruce Mouat 🔨	2	0	3	0	1	1	X	X	7

Sheet C	1	2	3	4	5	6	7	8	Final
(Alberta) Brendan Bottcher	0	3	0	0	1	0	1	X	5
(Newfoundland and Labrador) Brad Gushue 🔨	1	0	0	0	0	2	0	X	3

Sheet D	1	2	3	4	5	6	7	8	Final
(Ontario) Brad Jacobs 🔨	1	0	0	2	0	4	X	X	7
(Switzerland) Peter de Cruz	0	0	1	0	2	0	X	X	3

Sheet E	1	2	3	4	5	6	7	8	Final
(United States) John Shuster	0	1	0	2	0	0	1	0	4
(Switzerland) Yannick Schwaller 🔨	1	0	1	0	1	0	0	2	5

==== Tiebreakers ====
Saturday, October 26, 8:00 am

Sheet B	1	2	3	4	5	6	7	8	Final
(Switzerland) Peter de Cruz	0	0	1	0	0	1	1	0	3
(Ontario) John Epping 🔨	1	0	0	0	2	0	0	2	5

Player percentages
(Switzerland) Team de Cruz		(Ontario) Team Epping	
Valentin Tanner	94%	Brent Laing	88%
Peter de Cruz	82%	Mathew Camm	90%
Sven Michel	86%	Ryan Fry	87%
Benoît Schwarz	93%	John Epping	87%
Total	89%	Total	88%

Sheet C	1	2	3	4	5	6	7	8	9	Final
(Alberta) Kevin Koe	0	0	2	0	2	0	0	2	0	6
(Scotland) Ross Paterson 🔨	0	4	0	1	0	1	0	0	1	7

Player percentages
(Alberta) Team Koe		(Scotland) Team Paterson	
Ben Hebert	80%	Michael Goodfellow	94%
Colton Flasch	72%	Duncan Menzies	91%
B. J. Neufeld	76%	Kyle Waddell	91%
Kevin Koe	97%	Ross Paterson	92%
Total	81%	Total	92%

=== Playoffs ===
Quarterfinals
1	(Scotland) Bruce Mouat	6
8	(Scotland) Ross Paterson	3
4	(Saskatchewan) Matt Dunstone	5
5	(Ontario) Brad Jacobs	2
2	(Ontario) Team Howard	3
7	(Ontario) John Epping	7
3	(Alberta) Brendan Bottcher	2
6	(Newfoundland and Labrador) Brad Gushue	6

Semifinals
1	(Scotland) Bruce Mouat	4
4	(Saskatchewan) Matt Dunstone	5
7	(Ontario) John Epping	5
6	(Newfoundland and Labrador) Brad Gushue	7

Final
4	(Saskatchewan) Matt Dunstone	8
6	(Newfoundland and Labrador) Brad Gushue	5

==== Quarterfinals ====
Saturday, October 26, 12:00 pm

Sheet A	1	2	3	4	5	6	7	8	Final
(Alberta) Brendan Bottcher 🔨	0	1	0	1	0	0	0	X	2
(Newfoundland and Labrador) Brad Gushue	0	0	1	0	3	1	1	X	6

Player percentages
(Alberta) Team Bottcher		(Newfoundland and Labrador) Team Gushue	
Karrick Martin	88%	Geoff Walker	83%
Brad Thiessen	64%	Brett Gallant	87%
Darren Moulding	82%	Mark Nichols	94%
Brendan Bottcher	73%	Brad Gushue	88%
Total	77%	Total	88%

Sheet B	1	2	3	4	5	6	7	8	Final
(Scotland) Bruce Mouat 🔨	2	0	0	0	0	0	0	4	6
(Scotland) Ross Paterson	0	3	0	0	0	0	0	0	3

Player percentages
(Scotland) Team Mouat		(Scotland) Team Paterson	
Hammy McMillan Jr.	98%	Michael Goodfellow	89%
Bobby Lammie	88%	Duncan Menzies	75%
Grant Hardie	85%	Kyle Waddell	76%
Bruce Mouat	85%	Ross Paterson	75%
Total	89%	Total	79%

Sheet C	1	2	3	4	5	6	7	8	Final
(Saskatchewan) Matt Dunstone 🔨	0	0	1	0	0	2	1	1	5
(Ontario) Brad Jacobs	0	0	0	0	2	0	0	0	2

Player percentages
(Saskatchewan) Team Dunstone		(Ontario) Team Jacobs	
Dustin Kidby	99%	Ryan Harnden	84%
Catlin Schneider	88%	E. J. Harnden	100%
Braeden Moskowy	94%	Marc Kennedy	82%
Matt Dunstone	93%	Brad Jacobs	81%
Total	93%	Total	87%

Sheet D	1	2	3	4	5	6	7	8	Final
(Ontario) Team Howard 🔨	1	1	0	0	1	0	X	X	3
(Ontario) John Epping	0	0	2	2	0	3	X	X	7

Player percentages
(Ontario) Team Howard		(Ontario) Team Epping	
Tim March	81%	Brent Laing	92%
David Mathers	90%	Matt Camm	91%
Adam Spencer	81%	Ryan Fry	97%
Scott Howard	78%	John Epping	98%
Total	83%	Total	94%

==== Semifinals ====
Saturday, October 26, 8:00 pm

Sheet A	1	2	3	4	5	6	7	8	Final
(Scotland) Bruce Mouat 🔨	0	1	0	0	0	2	1	0	4
(Saskatchewan) Matt Dunstone	0	0	0	2	2	0	0	1	5

Player percentages
(Scotland) Team Mouat		(Saskatchewan) Team Dunstone	
Hammy McMillan Jr.	81%	Dustin Kidby	82%
Bobby Lammie	92%	Catlin Schneider	92%
Grant Hardie	84%	Braeden Moskowy	92%
Bruce Mouat	82%	Matt Dunstone	94%
Total	85%	Total	90%

Sheet C	1	2	3	4	5	6	7	8	Final
(Ontario) John Epping	0	0	2	0	2	0	1	0	5
(Newfoundland and Labrador) Brad Gushue 🔨	0	2	0	3	0	1	0	1	7

Player percentages
(Ontario) Team Epping		(Newfoundland and Labrador) Team Gushue	
Brent Laing	81%	Geoff Walker	84%
Matt Camm	79%	Brett Gallant	93%
Ryan Fry	100%	Mark Nichols	79%
John Epping	71%	Brad Gushue	94%
Total	84%	Total	87%

==== Final ====
Sunday, October 27, 4:30 pm

Sheet C	1	2	3	4	5	6	7	8	Final
(Saskatchewan) Matt Dunstone 🔨	1	0	3	0	2	0	1	1	8
(Newfoundland and Labrador) Brad Gushue	0	2	0	1	0	2	0	0	5

Player percentages
(Saskatchewan) Team Dunstone		(Newfoundland and Labrador) Team Gushue	
Dustin Kidby	82%	Geoff Walker	98%
Catlin Schneider	88%	Brett Gallant	93%
Braeden Moskowy	86%	Mark Nichols	81%
Matt Dunstone	77%	Brad Gushue	72%
Total	83%	Total	86%

== Women ==
=== Teams ===
The teams are listed as follows:

Skip	Third	Second	Lead	Locale
Theresa Cannon	Karen Klein	Vanessa Foster	Raunora Westcott	Winnipeg, Manitoba
Chelsea Carey	Sarah Wilkes	Dana Ferguson	Rachelle Brown	Calgary, Alberta
Kerri Einarson	Val Sweeting	Shannon Birchard	Briane Meilleur	Gimli, Manitoba
Tracy Fleury	Selena Njegovan	Liz Fyfe	Kristin MacCuish	East St. Paul, Manitoba
Satsuki Fujisawa	Chinami Yoshida	Yumi Suzuki	Yurika Yoshida	Kitami, Japan
Anna Hasselborg	Sara McManus	Agnes Knochenhauer	Sofia Mabergs	Sundbyberg, Sweden
Rachel Homan	Emma Miskew	Joanne Courtney	Lisa Weagle	Ottawa, Ontario
Jennifer Jones	Kaitlyn Lawes	Jocelyn Peterman	Dawn McEwen	Winnipeg, Manitoba
Eve Muirhead	Lauren Gray	Jennifer Dodds	Vicky Wright	Stirling, Scotland
Kelsey Rocque	Danielle Schmiemann	Jen Gates (Note: Jen Gates spared for Team Rocque's second, Becca Hebert.)	Jesse Marlow	Edmonton, Alberta
Amber Holland (Note: Amber Holland replaced Casey Scheidegger, who was due to give birth.)	Cary-Anne McTaggart	Jessie Haughian	Kristie Moore	Lethbridge, Alberta
Robyn Silvernagle	Stefanie Lawton	Jessie Hunkin	Kara Thevenot	North Battleford, Saskatchewan
Briar Hürlimann (Fourth)	Elena Stern (Skip)	Lisa Gisler	Céline Koller	Brig, Switzerland
Alina Pätz (Fourth)	Silvana Tirinzoni (Skip)	Esther Neuenschwander	Melanie Barbezat	Aarau, Switzerland
Sayaka Yoshimura	Kaho Onodera	Anna Ohmiya	Yumie Funayama	Sapporo, Japan

=== Round Robin Standings ===
Final Round Robin Standings

Key
Teams to Playoffs
Teams to Tiebreakers

Pool A	W	L	PF	PA
(Manitoba) Tracy Fleury	3	1	24	17
(Japan) Sayaka Yoshimura	3	1	19	22
(Switzerland) Elena Stern	2	2	20	19
(Ontario) Rachel Homan	1	3	24	21
(Alberta) Chelsea Carey	1	3	18	26

Pool B	W	L	PF	PA
(Sweden) Anna Hasselborg	4	0	22	10
(Manitoba) Jennifer Jones	3	1	20	16
(Japan) Satsuki Fujisawa	2	2	19	17
(Manitoba) Theresa Cannon	1	3	16	27
(Scotland) Eve Muirhead	0	4	16	23

Pool C	W	L	PF	PA
(Switzerland) Silvana Tirinzoni	4	0	22	17
(Manitoba) Kerri Einarson	2	2	24	18
(Alberta) Team Scheidegger	2	2	21	19
(Alberta) Kelsey Rocque	1	3	14	24
(Saskatchewan) Robyn Silvernagle	1	3	18	21

=== Round Robin Results ===
All draw times are listed in Eastern Daylight Time (UTC−04:00).

==== Draw 1 ====
Tuesday, October 22, 7:00 pm

Sheet A	1	2	3	4	5	6	7	8	Final
(Manitoba) Jennifer Jones 🔨	0	0	3	0	3	0	1	X	7
(Manitoba) Theresa Cannon	1	0	0	1	0	2	0	X	4

Sheet B	1	2	3	4	5	6	7	8	Final
(Ontario) Rachel Homan 🔨	2	2	0	1	0	2	3	X	10
(Japan) Sayaka Yoshimura	0	0	2	0	1	0	0	X	3

Sheet E	1	2	3	4	5	6	7	8	9	Final
(Switzerland) Silvana Tirinzoni 🔨	1	0	2	0	1	0	0	0	1	5
(Alberta) Kelsey Rocque	0	1	0	1	0	1	0	1	0	4

==== Draw 2 ====
Wednesday, October 23, 8:00 am

Sheet A	1	2	3	4	5	6	7	8	Final
(Manitoba) Tracy Fleury 🔨	0	2	2	0	0	2	0	1	7
(Switzerland) Elena Stern	0	0	0	2	1	0	2	0	5

Sheet C	1	2	3	4	5	6	7	8	Final
(Sweden) Anna Hasselborg	0	0	1	0	2	0	2	X	5
(Japan) Satsuki Fujisawa 🔨	0	0	0	1	0	2	0	X	3

==== Draw 3 ====
Wednesday, October 23, 12:00 pm

Sheet C	1	2	3	4	5	6	7	8	Final
(Manitoba) Kerri Einarson	0	3	1	1	4	0	X	X	9
(Alberta) Kelsey Rocque 🔨	1	0	0	0	0	2	X	X	3

Sheet D	1	2	3	4	5	6	7	8	Final
(Alberta) Team Scheidegger 🔨	1	1	0	0	0	1	0	3	6
(Saskatchewan) Robyn Silvernagle	0	0	1	0	1	0	2	0	4

==== Draw 4 ====
Wednesday, October 23, 4:00 pm

Sheet A	1	2	3	4	5	6	7	8	Final
(Alberta) Chelsea Carey 🔨	0	1	0	1	0	0	2	0	4
(Japan) Sayaka Yoshimura	0	0	2	0	1	2	0	1	6

Sheet C	1	2	3	4	5	6	7	8	Final
(Manitoba) Jennifer Jones	0	1	1	0	2	0	0	1	5
(Scotland) Eve Muirhead 🔨	0	0	0	2	0	1	1	0	4

Sheet E	1	2	3	4	5	6	7	8	9	Final
(Ontario) Rachel Homan 🔨	0	1	0	0	1	0	0	2	0	4
(Switzerland) Elena Stern	0	0	0	2	0	1	1	0	1	5

==== Draw 5 ====
Wednesday, October 23, 8:00 pm

Sheet A	1	2	3	4	5	6	7	8	Final
(Manitoba) Kerri Einarson 🔨	1	0	3	0	0	0	0	0	4
(Saskatchewan) Robyn Silvernagle	0	2	0	1	1	1	1	1	7

Sheet C	1	2	3	4	5	6	7	8	9	Final
(Switzerland) Silvana Tirinzoni	0	1	0	1	0	1	1	1	1	6
(Alberta) Team Scheidegger 🔨	3	0	1	0	1	0	0	0	0	5

Sheet D	1	2	3	4	5	6	7	8	Final
(Japan) Satsuki Fujisawa 🔨	3	0	0	0	2	2	0	X	7
(Manitoba) Theresa Cannon	0	0	2	0	0	0	2	X	4

==== Draw 6 ====
Thursday, October 24, 8:00 am

Sheet B	1	2	3	4	5	6	7	8	Final
(Alberta) Chelsea Carey	0	0	1	0	1	0	1	X	3
(Switzerland) Elena Stern 🔨	0	2	0	1	0	3	0	X	6

==== Draw 7 ====
Thursday, October 24, 12:00 pm

Sheet A	1	2	3	4	5	6	7	8	Final
(Alberta) Team Scheidegger	1	0	2	1	3	0	X	X	7
(Alberta) Kelsey Rocque 🔨	0	1	0	0	0	1	X	X	2

Sheet B	1	2	3	4	5	6	7	8	Final
(Sweden) Anna Hasselborg	0	0	1	1	2	3	X	X	7
(Manitoba) Theresa Cannon 🔨	0	1	0	0	0	0	X	X	1

==== Draw 8 ====
Thursday, October 24, 4:00 pm

Sheet B	1	2	3	4	5	6	7	8	Final
(Switzerland) Silvana Tirinzoni 🔨	0	2	1	2	0	1	0	0	6
(Saskatchewan) Robyn Silvernagle	1	0	0	0	1	0	1	1	4

Sheet C	1	2	3	4	5	6	7	8	Final
(Ontario) Rachel Homan	0	0	2	0	0	2	0	2	6
(Alberta) Chelsea Carey 🔨	2	1	0	2	1	0	2	0	8

Sheet E	1	2	3	4	5	6	7	8	9	Final
(Manitoba) Tracy Fleury 🔨	1	0	0	1	1	0	0	1	0	4
(Japan) Sayaka Yoshimura	0	0	1	0	0	2	1	0	1	5

==== Draw 9 ====
Thursday, October 24, 8:00 pm

Sheet B	1	2	3	4	5	6	7	8	Final
(Manitoba) Kerri Einarson 🔨	1	0	0	3	0	0	3	X	7
(Alberta) Team Scheidegger	0	1	1	0	1	0	0	X	3

Sheet D	1	2	3	4	5	6	7	8	Final
(Sweden) Anna Hasselborg	0	0	0	0	0	0	2	2	4
(Scotland) Eve Muirhead 🔨	0	1	0	0	1	1	0	0	3

Sheet E	1	2	3	4	5	6	7	8	Final
(Manitoba) Jennifer Jones 🔨	0	1	1	2	1	0	0	X	5
(Japan) Satsuki Fujisawa	0	0	0	0	0	1	1	X	2

==== Draw 10 ====
Friday, October 25, 8:00 am

Sheet C	1	2	3	4	5	6	7	8	Final
(Saskatchewan) Robyn Silvernagle 🔨	0	0	2	0	1	0	0	0	3
(Alberta) Kelsey Rocque	0	0	0	2	0	1	1	1	5

==== Draw 11 ====
Friday, October 25, 12:00 pm

Sheet B	1	2	3	4	5	6	7	8	Final
(Alberta) Chelsea Carey	0	0	0	0	3	0	X	X	3
(Manitoba) Tracy Fleury 🔨	2	1	0	3	0	2	X	X	8

Sheet C	1	2	3	4	5	6	7	8	Final
(Manitoba) Kerri Einarson 🔨	1	0	0	1	0	0	1	1	4
(Switzerland) Silvana Tirinzoni	0	1	1	0	1	2	0	0	5

Sheet D	1	2	3	4	5	6	7	8	Final
(Japan) Sayaka Yoshimura	0	0	0	2	1	0	0	2	5
(Switzerland) Elena Stern 🔨	0	1	1	0	0	1	1	0	4

Sheet E	1	2	3	4	5	6	7	8	Final
(Scotland) Eve Muirhead	0	0	0	2	0	0	4	0	6
(Manitoba) Theresa Cannon 🔨	0	1	1	0	3	1	0	1	7

==== Draw 13 ====
Friday, October 25, 7:30 pm

Sheet A	1	2	3	4	5	6	7	8	Final
(Japan) Satsuki Fujisawa	0	2	0	1	2	0	2	X	7
(Scotland) Eve Muirhead 🔨	0	0	1	0	0	2	0	X	3

Sheet C	1	2	3	4	5	6	7	8	Final
(Sweden) Anna Hasselborg 🔨	0	2	0	1	1	0	2	X	6
(Manitoba) Jennifer Jones	0	0	1	0	0	2	0	X	3

Sheet D	1	2	3	4	5	6	7	8	9	Final
(Ontario) Rachel Homan	0	1	0	1	0	0	0	2	0	4
(Manitoba) Tracy Fleury 🔨	1	0	1	0	0	0	2	0	1	5

==== Tiebreaker ====
Saturday, October 26, 8:00 am

Sheet D	1	2	3	4	5	6	7	8	Final
(Alberta) Team Scheidegger	0	1	0	1	0	1	0	X	3
(Japan) Satsuki Fujisawa 🔨	1	0	1	0	3	0	2	X	7

Player percentages
(Alberta) Team Scheidegger		(Japan) Team Fujisawa	
Kristie Moore	99%	Yurika Yoshida	76%
Jessie Haughian	93%	Yumi Suzuki	85%
Cary-Anne McTaggart	81%	Chinami Yoshida	88%
Amber Holland	67%	Satsuki Fujisawa	79%
Total	86%	Total	82%

=== Playoffs ===
Quarterfinals
1	(Switzerland) Silvana Tirinzoni	7
8	(Japan) Satsuki Fujisawa	6
4	(Manitoba) Jennifer Jones	4
5	(Japan) Sayaka Yoshimura	6
2	(Sweden) Anna Hasselborg	7
7	(Manitoba) Kerri Einarson	1
3	(Manitoba) Tracy Fleury	7
6	(Switzerland) Elena Stern	3

Semifinals
1	(Switzerland) Silvana Tirinzoni	4
5	(Japan) Sayaka Yoshimura	7
2	(Sweden) Anna Hasselborg	5
3	(Manitoba) Tracy Fleury	7

Final
5	(Japan) Sayaka Yoshimura	5
3	(Manitoba) Tracy Fleury	7

==== Quarterfinals ====
Saturday, October 26, 4:00 pm

Sheet A	1	2	3	4	5	6	7	8	Final
(Manitoba) Jennifer Jones	0	0	1	0	0	3	0	0	4
(Japan) Sayaka Yoshimura 🔨	0	1	0	0	2	0	2	1	6

Player percentages
(Manitoba) Team Jones		(Japan) Team Yoshimura	
Dawn McEwen	91%	Yumie Funayama	92%
Jocelyn Peterman	76%	Anna Ohmiya	78%
Kaitlyn Lawes	65%	Kaho Onodera	75%
Jennifer Jones	67%	Sayaka Yoshimura	87%
Total	75%	Total	83%

Sheet B	1	2	3	4	5	6	7	8	9	Final
(Switzerland) Silvana Tirinzoni 🔨	3	0	0	1	0	2	0	0	1	7
(Japan) Satsuki Fujisawa	0	2	0	0	2	0	1	1	0	6

Player percentages
(Switzerland) Team Tirinzoni		(Japan) Team Fujisawa	
Melanie Barbezat	79%	Yurika Yoshida	76%
Esther Neuenschwander	89%	Yumi Suzuki	76%
Silvana Tirinzoni	92%	Chinami Yoshida	62%
Alina Pätz	77%	Satsuki Fujisawa	75%
Total	84%	Total	72%

Sheet C	1	2	3	4	5	6	7	8	Final
(Sweden) Anna Hasselborg 🔨	0	2	1	0	4	X	X	X	7
(Manitoba) Kerri Einarson	0	0	0	1	0	X	X	X	1

Player percentages
(Sweden) Team Hasselborg		(Manitoba) Team Einarson	
Sofia Mabergs	88%	Briane Meilleur	75%
Agnes Knochenhauer	87%	Shannon Birchard	64%
Sara McManus	77%	Val Sweeting	79%
Anna Hasselborg	90%	Kerri Einarson	74%
Total	85%	Total	73%

Sheet D	1	2	3	4	5	6	7	8	Final
(Manitoba) Tracy Fleury 🔨	4	1	0	0	2	0	X	X	7
(Switzerland) Elena Stern	0	0	1	1	0	1	X	X	3

Player percentages
(Manitoba) Team Fleury		(Switzerland) Team Stern	
Kristin MacCuish	85%	Céline Koller	67%
Liz Fyfe	84%	Lisa Gisler	86%
Selena Njegovan	94%	Elena Stern	74%
Tracy Fleury	80%	Briar Hürlimann	54%
Total	86%	Total	70%

==== Semifinals ====
Saturday, October 26, 8:00 pm

Sheet B	1	2	3	4	5	6	7	8	Final
(Sweden) Anna Hasselborg 🔨	0	1	0	2	0	0	0	2	5
(Manitoba) Tracy Fleury	0	0	2	0	2	2	1	0	7

Player percentages
(Sweden) Team Hasselborg		(Manitoba) Team Fleury	
Sofia Mabergs	88%	Kristin MacCuish	82%
Agnes Knochenhauer	85%	Liz Fyfe	85%
Sara McManus	87%	Selena Njegovan	80%
Anna Hasselborg	62%	Tracy Fleury	86%
Total	81%	Total	83%

Sheet D	1	2	3	4	5	6	7	8	Final
(Switzerland) Silvana Tirinzoni 🔨	0	1	0	2	0	0	1	0	4
(Japan) Sayaka Yoshimura	0	0	1	0	2	3	0	1	7

Player percentages
(Switzerland) Team Tirinzoni		(Japan) Team Yoshimura	
Melanie Barbezat	64%	Yumie Funayama	75%
Esther Neuenschwander	77%	Anna Ohmiya	87%
Silvana Tirinzoni	83%	Kaho Onodera	75%
Alina Pätz	76%	Sayaka Yoshimura	84%
Total	75%	Total	80%

==== Final ====
Sunday, October 27, 12:00 pm

Sheet C	1	2	3	4	5	6	7	8	Final
(Japan) Sayaka Yoshimura	0	2	0	0	1	0	2	0	5
(Manitoba) Tracy Fleury 🔨	2	0	2	1	0	1	0	1	7

Player percentages
(Japan) Team Yoshimura		(Manitoba) Team Fleury	
Yumie Funayama	91%	Kristin MacCuish	89%
Anna Ohmiya	85%	Liz Fyfe	81%
Kaho Onodera	73%	Selena Njegovan	81%
Sayaka Yoshimura	62%	Tracy Fleury	91%
Total	78%	Total	86%
