= List of curling clubs in Saskatchewan =

This is a list of curling clubs in the Canadian province of Saskatchewan. They are organized by the provincial curling association, CURLSASK, into eight regions. Curling is the provincial sport of Saskatchewan.

== Regina Region ==
- Caledonian Curling Club - Regina
- Highland Curling Club - Regina

== Saskatoon Region ==
- CN Curling Club - Saskatoon
- Nutana Curling Club - Saskatoon
- Sutherland Curling Club - Saskatoon

== North West Region ==
- Big River Curling Club - Big River
- Blaine Lake Curling Club - Blaine Lake
- Dalmeny Curling Club - Dalmeny
- Debden Curling Club - Debden
- Denzil Curling Club - Denzil
- Edam Curling Club - Edam
- Langham Curling Club - Langham
- Lashburn Curling Club - Lashburn
- Livelong Curling Club - Livelong
- Maidstone Curling Club - Maidstone
- Makwa Curling Club - Makwa
- Meadow Lake Curling Club - Meadow Lake
- Medstead Curling Club - Medstead
- Shell Lake Curling Club - Shell Lake
- Spiritwood Curling Club - Spiritwood
- Turtleford Curling Club - Turtleford
- Twin Rivers Curling Club - North Battleford
- Unity Curling Club - Unity
- Wilkie Curling Club - Wilkie

== North East Region ==
- Arborfield Curling Club - Arborfield
- Birch Hills Curling Club - Birch Hillsx`
- Canwood Curling Club - Canwood
- Carrot River Curling Club - Carrot River
- Hudson Bay Curling Club - Hudson Bay
- Lakeland Curling Club - Christopher Lake
- Melfort Curling Club - Melfort
- Naicam Curling Club - Naicam
- Nipawin Curling Club - Nipawin
- Prince Albert Golf & Curling Club - Prince Albert
- Shellbrook Curling Club - Shellbrook
- St. Front Curling Club - Rose Valley
- Tisdale Curling Club - Tisdale
- Wakaw Curling Club - Wakaw
- Weekes Curling Club - Weekes

== West Central Region ==
- Aberdeen Curling Club - Aberdeen
- Allan Curling Club - Allan
- Biggar Curling Club - Biggar
- Davidson Curling Club - Davidson
- Hanley Curling Club - Hanley
- Kerrobert Curling Club - Kerrobert
- Kindersley Curling Club - Kindersley
- Kyle Curling Club - Kyle
- Martensville Curling Club - Martensville
- Outlook Curling Club - Outlook
- Rosetown Curling Club - Rosetown
- Watrous Curling Club - Watrous

== East Central Region ==
- Churchbridge Curling Club - Churchbridge
- Esterhazy Curling Club - Esterhazy
- Foam Lake Curling Club - Foam Lake
- Humboldt Curling Club - Humboldt
- Indian Head Curling Club - Indian Head
- Ituna Curling Club - Ituna
- Kamsack Curling Club - Kamsack
- Langenburg Curling Club - Langenburg
- Lanigan Curling Club - Lanigan
- Leroy Curling Club - Leroy
- Lumsden Curling Club - Lumsden
- Melville Curling Club - Melville
- Muenster Curling Club - Muenster
- Nokomis Curling Club - Nokomis
- Norquay Curling Club - Norquay
- Preeceville Curling Club - Preeceville
- Raymore Curling Club - Raymore
- Saltcoats Curling Club - Saltcoats
- Strasbourg Curling Club - Strasbourg
- Wadena Curling Club - Wadena
- Yorkton Curling Club - Yorkton

== South East Region ==
- Alameda Curling Club - Alameda
- Arcola Curling Club - Arcola
- Avonlea Curling Club - Avonlea
- Balgonie Curling Club - Balgonie
- Bengough Curling Club - Bengough
- Bienfait Curling Club - Bienfait
- Carlyle Curling Club - Carlyle
- Carnduff Curling Club - Carnduff
- Estevan Curling Club - Estevan
- Gainsborough Curling Club - Gainsborough
- Grenfell Curling Club - Grenfell
- Kipling Curling Club - Kipling
- Kronau Curling Club - Kronau
- Lemberg Curling Club - Lemberg
- Maryfield Curling Club - Maryfield
- Midale Curling Club - Midale
- Milestone Curling Club - Milestone
- Moosomin Curling Club - Moosomin
- Neudorf Curling Club - Neudorf
- Ogema Curling Club - Ogema
- Oxbow Curling Club - Oxbow
- Pense Curling Club - Pense
- Redvers Curling Club - Redvers
- Stoughton Curling Club - Stoughton
- Wawota Curling Club - Wawota
- Weyburn Curling Club - Weyburn

== South West Region ==
- Abbey Curling Club - Abbey
- Assiniboia Curling Club - Assiniboia
- Burstall Curling Club - Burstall
- Central Butte Curling Club - Central Butte
- Coronach Curling Club - Coronach
- Eastend Curling Club - Eastend
- Fox Valley Curling Club - Fox Valley
- Frontier Curling Club - Frontier
- Glentworth Curling Club - Glentworth
- Gravelbourg Curling Club - Gravelbourg
- Gull Lake Curling Club - Gull Lake
- Hazlet Curling Club - Hazlet
- Herbert Curling Club - Herbert
- Lafleche Curling Club - Lafleche
- Leader Curling Club - Leader
- Maple Creek Curling Club - Maple Creek
- Moose Jaw Curling Centre - Moose Jaw
- Morse Curling Club - Morse
- Mossbank Curling Club - Mossbank
- Shaunavon Curling Club - Shaunavon
- Swift Current Curling Club - Swift Current

== Other ==
- Lloydminster Curling Club - Lloydminster (a member of Curling Alberta)
