= Curlsask =

CURLSASK
- Sport: Curling
- Jurisdiction: Provincial
- Membership: 133 curling clubs
- Founded: 1904
- Affiliation: Curling Canada
- Headquarters: Regina

Official website
- curlsask.ca
- (Canada)

CURLSASK (stylized CURLSASK), formerly known as the Saskatchewan Curling Association, is the regional governing body for the sport of curling in Saskatchewan. It was founded in 1904.

The association has more than 130 member curling clubs organized into 8 regions: Southwest, Southeast, West Central, East Central, Northeast, Northwest, Regina, and Saskatoon.

== Provincial championships ==
CURLSASK hosts 13 provincial championships annually:

- SaskTel Tankard (Men's)
- Bunge Prairie Pinnacle (Women's)
- Mixed
- Mixed Doubles
- U20
- U20 Mixed Doubles
- U18
- Seniors
- Masters
- Club
- Rotating 4's
- 2-Person Stick
- Wheelchair

== See also ==
- List of curling clubs in Saskatchewan
