= Colton Flasch =

Canadian curler (born 1991)

- Curler
- Born: February 27, 1991 (age 35); Biggar, Saskatchewan, Canada

Team
- Curling club: Nutana CC, Saskatoon, SK
- Skip: Tyler Tardi
- Third: Colton Flasch
- Second: Kevin Marsh
- Lead: Dan Marsh

Curling career
- Member Association: Saskatchewan (2009–2018; 2020–present); Alberta (2018–2020)
- Brier: 9 (2014, 2015, 2016, 2019, 2020, 2022, 2024, 2025, 2026)
- World Championship: 1 (2019)
- Top CTRS ranking: 2nd (2018–19)
- Grand Slam victories: 1 (2026 Masters)
Medal record
Representing Canada
World Men's Curling Championship
Silver medal – second place	2019 Lethbridge
Representing Alberta
The Brier
Gold medal – first place	2019 Brandon
Representing Saskatchewan
Canadian Olympic Curling Trials
Bronze medal – third place	2025 Halifax
The Brier
Silver medal – second place	2024 Regina
Bronze medal – third place	2015 Calgary

Colton Flasch (born February 27, 1991) is a Canadian curler currently residing in Saskatoon, Saskatchewan. He currently plays third on Team Tyler Tardi.

== Career ==
=== Juniors ===
After having curled with the Mike Armstrong junior rink, Flasch joined the Braeden Moskowy rink at second position in 2010. The team won the Saskatchewan Junior championships that year, earning the rink the right to represent Saskatchewan at the 2011 Canadian Junior Curling Championships. At the Canadian Juniors, the team- which also included Kirk Muyres and Matt Lang- went undefeated (12-0) through the round robin, and proceeded to win the event by defeating Ontario's Mathew Camm in the final. The team would go on to represent Canada at the 2011 World Junior Curling Championships where they would find less success. The team found themselves in 4th place after the round robin with a 6–3 record. The team beat Norway (Steffen Mellemseter) in their first playoff match, but in the semi-final they lost to Switzerland (Peter de Cruz), and then lost to Norway again in the bronze medal game. After the World Juniors, the team played in their first Grand Slam event, the 2011 Players' Championship where they surprised many by making into the quarterfinals. After the season, Moskowy and Muyres graduated from the junior level. Lang and Flasch remained together, with Lang at skip and Flasch at second. They added Tyler Hartung and Jayden Shwaga.

=== Men's ===
Following juniors, Flasch joined the Steve Laycock rink at second, rejoining his former junior teammate, Kirk Muyres who is third on the team. Kirk's brother Dallan would play lead. In Flasch's first season with the Laycock rink, the team would play in all four Grand Slam events, making it to the semi-finals of the 2012 Masters of Curling. At the 2013 provincial men's championship, the team finished 4th. Following the season, the team had accumulated enough CTRS points to qualify for the "Road to the Roar" 2013 Canadian Olympic pre-qualifying event. At the "Road to the Roar" the following season, the team placed fourth, which was not good enough to qualify for the 2013 Canadian Olympic Curling Trials.

The Laycock rink would win the 2014 SaskTel Tankard men's provincial championship, sending the team to the 2014 Tim Hortons Brier, Flasch's first. At the Brier, the team narrowly missed the playoffs, after finishing the round robin with a 6–5 record.

In the 2014-15 curling season, the team had their best year yet finishing the season 4th on the World Curling Tour's money list. The team qualified in the first three Grand Slams with a runner up finish to Team Gushue at the 2014 Canadian Open of Curling. The Laycock team repeated as Saskatchewan champions, and would represent Saskatchewan at the 2015 Tim Hortons Brier. There, they finished the round robin with an 8–4 record finishing 3rd in the round robin. They would lose the 3 vs. 4 game to Team Canada, but would go on to win the bronze medal.

They Laycock rink won the 2016 SaskTel Tankard and represented Saskatchewan at the 2016 Tim Hortons Brier. There, they finished out of the playoffs with a 5–6 record.

After the team lost in the final of the 2017 SaskTel Tankard, Flasch announced he was leaving the Laycock rink. For the 2017-18 curling season, Flasch formed a new team of Kevin Marsh, Daniel Marsh and Trent Knapp, with Flasch skipping the team. His new team would win one tour event, the 2017 College Clean Restoration Curling Classic. This qualified them for the season-ending 2018 Humpty's Champions Cup, their lone slam of the season, where they would lose in a tiebreaker. The team played in the 2017 Canadian Olympic Curling Pre-Trials, where they finished with a 2–4 record, missing the playoffs. At the 2018 SaskTel Tankard, Flacsh led his team all the way to the finals, where he lost to his former skip, Steve Laycock.

Flasch joined the new Calgary-based team of Kevin Koe, B. J. Neufeld and Ben Hebert the following season. His new team began the 2018–19 season by winning the first leg of the Curling World Cup, defeating Norway's Steffen Walstad in the final. They also reached the final of the Canad Inns Men's Classic, but were beaten by the Brendan Bottcher rink. They also lost in the final of the 2018 Canada Cup to the Brad Jacobs rink 5–4. They had previously gone 4–2 in the round robin and won both the tiebreaker and semifinal games. In February, Team Koe finished runner-up to Team Bottcher at the 2019 TSN All-Star Curling Skins Game, earning $36,000 for their second place finish. In provincial playdowns, the Koe rink lost two of their first three games at the 2019 Boston Pizza Cup, before winning five straight games to claim the Alberta provincial title. The team represented Alberta at the 2019 Tim Hortons Brier where they went undefeated throughout the entire tournament. After an 11–0 record through the round robin and championship pools, they beat Northern Ontario's Jacobs rink in the 1 vs. 2 game. They then faced the Bottcher rink in the final where, after a close game all the way through, Koe would execute a double takeout to score two in the tenth end and win the game 4–3 for the team. The win earned the team the right to represent Canada at the 2019 World Men's Curling Championship where they finished the round robin with a 9–3 record. They then won two playoff games to qualify for the final where they lost to Sweden's Niklas Edin rink 7–2, settling for silver. In Grand Slam play, the team failed to win any slams, but did make it to three finals at the 2018 Masters, the 2019 Players' Championship and the 2019 Champions Cup. They also reached the semifinals once and the quarterfinals in the three other events. Despite the lack of any event wins, their strong play was good enough to award them with the Pinty's Cup for the season's best Slam team. The team ended the season at the grand final of the Curling World Cup, where they beat the host Chinese team Zou Qiang in the final to secure another event title. Also during the 2018–19 season, the Koe rink along with five other teams represented North America at the 2019 Continental Cup where they lost by eight points.

Team Koe started their 2019–20 season at the 2019 AMJ Campbell Shorty Jenkins Classic and lost in the quarterfinal to Brad Jacobs. They lost the final of the Stu Sells Toronto Tankard to the Jacobs rink as well. In Grand Slam play, they made the semifinal of the 2019 Tour Challenge and the quarterfinals of the 2019 National. They then, however, missed the playoffs at both the 2019 Masters and the 2020 Canadian Open. At the 2019 Canada Cup, they finished the round robin with a 5–1 record, which qualified them directly for the final which they lost to the John Epping rink. To start 2020, Team Koe once again competed in the 2020 Continental Cup but were this time defeated by Team Europe by fifteen points. At the 2020 Tim Hortons Brier, representing Team Canada, they finished the championship pool with a 7–4 record, which was in a four-way tie for fourth. They faced Jacobs in the first round of tiebreakers where they lost 8–3 and were eliminated. It would be the team's last event of the season as both the Players' Championship and the Champions Cup Grand Slam events were cancelled due to the COVID-19 pandemic. On March 16, 2020, Team Koe announced they would be parting ways with Flasch. He was replaced by John Morris. Flasch then formed his own team with Catlin Schneider, Kevin Marsh and Dan Marsh for the 2020–21 season.

The new Team Flasch played in a limited number of events during the 2020–21 season due to the pandemic. Of the three events they participated in, they won two local events in Saskatoon. Due to the COVID-19 pandemic in Canada, the qualification process for the 2021 Canadian Olympic Curling Trials had to be modified to qualify enough teams for the championship. In these modifications, Curling Canada created the 2021 Canadian Curling Trials Direct-Entry Event, an event where five teams would compete to try to earn one of three spots into the 2021 Canadian Olympic Curling Trials. Team Flasch qualified for the Trials Direct-Entry Event due to their World Ranking. The team went 1–3 through the round-robin, finishing in fourth place and not advancing directly to the Trials. Team Flasch had one final chance to advance to the Olympic Trials through the 2021 Canadian Olympic Curling Pre-Trials, however, they lost their final two round robin games and did not advance to the playoff round. Elsewhere on tour, the team had back-to-back semifinal finishes at the IG Wealth Management Western Showdown and the Nufloors Penticton Curling Classic. They also finished runner-up at the Red Deer Curling Classic after losing to the Ryan Jacques rink in the final. Entering the 2022 SaskTel Tankard, Team Flasch were the second ranked team behind the Matt Dunstone rink. After losing two games early in the triple knockout event, the team rallied off four straight victories to reach the provincial final where they faced the Dunstone rink. Following a single in the ninth end to take the lead, Team Flasch stole a point in the tenth end to upset Team Dunstone and win the provincial title. The win earned them the right to represent Saskatchewan at the 2022 Tim Hortons Brier where they finished with a 6–2 round robin record, including a victory over the Dunstone rink in the final draw. They then had to play Dunstone (representing Wild Card) again in a tiebreaker, which they won 9–5. In the playoffs, they knocked off Northern Ontario's Brad Jacobs rink before losing to former teammates in Alberta's Koe rink and Brad Gushue's Wild Card team, settling for fourth. They ended their season at the 2022 Players' Championship Grand Slam event where they missed the playoffs.

== Personal life ==
Flasch is employed as the owner of Flasch Construction Inc. He attended the University of Saskatchewan and Biggar Central School.

== Grand Slam record ==
Key
C	Champion
F	Lost in Final
SF	Lost in Semifinal
QF	Lost in Quarterfinals
R16	Lost in the round of 16
Q	Did not advance to playoffs
T2	Played in Tier 2 event
DNP	Did not participate in event
N/A	Not a Grand Slam event that season

Event	2010–11	2011–12	2012–13	2013–14	2014–15	2015–16	2016–17	2017–18	2018–19	2019–20	2020–21	2021–22	2022–23	2023–24	2024–25	2025–26	2026–27
Invitational	N/A	N/A	N/A	N/A	N/A	Q	QF	T2	QF	SF	N/A	N/A	Q	T2	SF	Q	DNP
Masters	DNP	DNP	SF	DNP	QF	SF	SF	DNP	F	Q	N/A	DNP	Q	Q	Q	Q	C
National	DNP	DNP	Q	SF	QF	Q	Q	DNP	SF	QF	N/A	DNP	QF	DNP	SF	QF	DNP
Open	DNP	DNP	Q	Q	F	QF	QF	DNP	QF	Q	N/A	N/A	Q	Q	Q	Q	
Players'	QF	DNP	Q	Q	Q	QF	DNP	DNP	F	N/A	DNP	Q	DNP	SF	QF	Q	
Champions Cup	N/A	N/A	N/A	N/A	N/A	QF	QF	Q	F	N/A	DNP	DNP	DNP	N/A	N/A	N/A	N/A
Elite 10	N/A	N/A	N/A	N/A	Q	QF	DNP	DNP	QF	N/A	N/A	N/A	N/A	N/A	N/A	N/A	N/A

== Teams ==
Season	Skip	Third	Second	Lead
2012–13	Steve Laycock	Kirk Muyres	Colton Flasch	Dallan Muyres
2013–14	Steve Laycock	Kirk Muyres	Colton Flasch	Dallan Muyres
2014–15	Steve Laycock	Kirk Muyres	Colton Flasch	Dallan Muyres
2015–16	Steve Laycock	Kirk Muyres	Colton Flasch	Dallan Muyres
2016–17	Steve Laycock	Kirk Muyres	Colton Flasch	Dallan Muyres
2017–18	Colton Flasch	Kevin Marsh	Dan Marsh	Trent Knapp
2018–19	Kevin Koe	B. J. Neufeld	Colton Flasch	Ben Hebert
2019–20	Kevin Koe	B. J. Neufeld	Colton Flasch	Ben Hebert
2020–21	Colton Flasch	Catlin Schneider	Kevin Marsh	Dan Marsh
2021–22	Colton Flasch	Catlin Schneider	Kevin Marsh	Dan Marsh
2022–23	Colton Flasch	Catlin Schneider	Kevin Marsh	Dan Marsh
2023–24	Mike McEwen	Colton Flasch	Kevin Marsh	Dan Marsh
2024–25	Mike McEwen	Colton Flasch	Kevin Marsh	Dan Marsh
2025–26	Mike McEwen	Colton Flasch	Kevin Marsh	Dan Marsh
2026–27	Tyler Tardi	Colton Flasch	Kevin Marsh	Dan Marsh
