= D. J. Kidby =

Canadian curler (born 1987)

DJ Kidby
- Curler
- Born: March 24, 1987 (age 39); Regina, Saskatchewan, Canada

Team
- Curling club: Callie CC, Regina, SK

Curling career
- Brier: 1 (2013)
Medal record
Men's curling
Representing Canada
World Junior Curling Championships
Gold medal – first place	2005 Pinerolo

David "D. J." Kidby (born March 24, 1987) is a Canadian curler from Regina, Saskatchewan.

== Curling career ==
Kidby had a successful junior career which involved winning two provincial junior titles, a national and a world junior championship. Kidby threw second stones for the Kyle George rink in 2005, and they would win the 2005 Canadian Junior Curling Championships and the 2005 World Junior Curling Championships on top of their provincial junior title. Kidby won a second junior title in 2008 throwing second stones for Brennen Jones. That team lost in a tie-breaker at the 2008 Canadian Junior Curling Championships.

After juniors, Kidby moved to Alberta to play lead for the Chris Schille rink out of Edmonton. In 2010, Kidby and Schille joined the Don Walchuk rink with Kidby throwing second stones. That arrangement lasted one season before Kidby moved back to Regina to play second for Braeden Moskowy. In 2012, Schille moved to Saskatchewan to play on the team, as did former Albertan Brock Virtue who would skip, bumping Moskowy to third. Schille would move to second while Kidby moved to the lead position.

Kidby played in his first Alberta men's provincial championship with Walchuk in 2011. The team did not fare well, winning just two matches. After moving back to Saskatchewan, Kidby would play in his first Saskatchewan men's provincial championship in 2012 with Moskowy. That team also did not fare well, winning just one match. However, the new lineup at the 2013 SaskTel Tankard would fare much better. The team lost just two matches en route to their first provincial title. They would go on to represent Saskatchewan at the 2013 Tim Hortons Brier.

Kidby's first season on the World Curling Tour was in 2008-09 with Schille. The team played in one Grand Slam event, the 2009 Players' Championships, where they lost all three matches. The next season, the team again played in just one Grand Slam, this time it was the 2010 BDO Classic Canadian Open, where they again went win less, going 0-5. The next season, with Walchuk, Kidby would play in two slams, the 2010 The National (December), where the team would make it to the quarterfinals, and the 2011 BDO Canadian Open of Curling (January), where the team lost in a tie breaker match. Kidby's next Grand Slam event was at the 2012 Canadian Open of Curling playing lead for Kevin Koe, whose normal lead was absent due to personal matters. At that event, the team lost in the quarterfinals.

Outside of Slams, Kidby has been on two teams that have won WCT bonspiels. He won the 2012 The Shoot-Out with Walchuk and the 2011 DEKALB Superspiel with Moskowy.

== Personal life ==
Kidby is employed as a sales representative for Titan Automotive.
