= Highland Curling Club =

Curling club in Regina, Canada

- Location: 348 Broad Street; Regina, Saskatchewan S4R 1W9

Information
- Established: 1954
- Club type: Dedicated ice
- Curling Canada region: SCA Regina
- Sheets of ice: Six
- Rock colours: Blue and yellow

The Highland Curling Club is a curling club located in Regina, Saskatchewan, Canada. It is one of two clubs in the city, along with the Caledonian Curling Club.

== History ==
The club was founded in 1954 as the Imperial Curling Club, with three natural ice sheets, with a focus on access for students at Imperial School. In 1958, the club switched to artificial ice. In 1970, the club renamed itself the Highland Curling Club to avoid confusion with the town of Imperial. In 1974, the club sold its rink to the Kronau Curling Club in nearby Kronau; the Kronau club dismantled and hauled the rink from Regina and rebuilt it, opening it by 1976. The Highland Club build a new six-sheet facility that opened in 1975.

=== Provincial champions ===
The Highland has produced a number of provincial men's and women's champions in recent years. The Jolene Campbell rink was the first to win a provincial title, securing the 2016 Saskatchewan Tournament of Hearts to represent the province at the national Tournament of Hearts. Campbell won a second provincial title ten years later in 2026. In 2017, Adam Casey's team won the first provincial men's title for the club, defeating three-time defending champion Steve Laycock in the final. In 2020, Matt Dunstone's rink advanced to the Tim Horton's Brier, where they amassed an 8–5 record en route to a third-place finish. Most recently, Kelly Knapp's rink won the 2023 and 2026 Tankards—Knapp won the Ross Harstone Sportsmanship award, voted on by the players, at the 2023 Tim Hortons Brier. Teams from the Highland also represented the province at the 2014 and 2015 Canadian Club Championships.

Provincial titles by Highland rinks
Year	Event	Skip	Third	Second	Lead	Nationals record
2026	SaskTel Tankard	Kelly Knapp	Brennen Jones	Dustin Kidby	Mat Ring	3–5
2026	Prairie Pinnacle	Jolene Campbell	Robyn Silvernagle	Rachel Big Eagle	Dayna Demmans	3–5
2023	SaskTel Tankard	Kelly Knapp	Brennen Jones	Mike Armstrong	Trent Knapp	4–4
2020	SaskTel Tankard	Matt Dunstone	Braeden Moskowy	Catlin Schneider	Dustin Kidby	8–5
2017	SaskTel Tankard	Adam Casey	Catlin Schneider	Shaun Meachem	Dustin Kidby	5–6
2016	Scotties Tournament of Hearts	Jolene Campbell	Ashley Howard	Callan Hamon	Ashley Williamson	6–5

== See also ==
- List of curling clubs in Saskatchewan
