= Dallan Muyres =

Canadian curler (born 1987)

- Curler
- Born: February 25, 1987 (age 39); Humboldt, Saskatchewan, Canada

Team
- Curling club: Nutana CC, Saskatoon, SK
- Skip: Dallan Muyres
- Third: Garret Springer
- Second: Jordan Tardi
- Lead: Dustin Mikush

Curling career
- Brier: 6 (2011, 2014, 2015, 2016, 2018, 2019)
- Top CTRS ranking: 4th (2014–15)
Medal record
Men's curling
Representing Saskatchewan
Tim Hortons Brier
| Bronze medal – third place | 2015 Calgary |

Dallan Muyres (born February 25, 1987) is a Canadian curler from Saskatoon, Saskatchewan. He currently skips his own team. He grew up in St. Gregor, Saskatchewan.

== Career ==
=== Juniors ===
Muyres was a member of the Brennen Jones rink at the 2008 Canadian Junior Curling Championships, which lost in the tiebreaker match.

=== Men's ===
After juniors, briefly skipped his own team in 2010, making it to the 2010 SaskTel Tankard, the provincial men's championship in Saskatchewan. There, the led his team of Matt Ryback, Dan Marsh and Aaron Shutra to three wins, before losing a third game in the triple knockout tournament.

The next season, he joined the Pat Simmons team, throwing lead rocks. The rink won one World Curling Tour event, the Meyers Norris Penny Charity Classic and made the quarterfinals at the 2011 BDO Canadian Open of Curling. The team won the 2011 SaskTel Tankard, qualifying the rink for the 2011 Tim Hortons Brier, representing Saskatchewan. There, the team finished with a 4-7 record. After the season, Simmons left for Alberta, and third Steve Laycock took over the team as skip.

In the 2011-12 season, the team did not win any tour events, and did not make it to the playoffs in any Grand Slam events. Despite being one of the top ranked teams, the rink won just one game at the 2012 SaskTel Tankard. The next season, the team found some more success, making it to the semi-final of the 2012 Masters of Curling. The team made it to the playoffs of the 2013 SaskTel Tankard, but lost in the 3 vs. 4 game.

In the 2013–14, the team did not find any more luck on tour, making the playoffs in just one slam, losing in the semi-final of the 2014 Syncrude National. The team did however win the 2014 SaskTel Tankard, qualifying the team to represent Saskatchewan at the 2014 Tim Hortons Brier. There, the team narrowly missed the playoffs, finishing the event with a 6-5 record.

The next season the team found more success, winning the Weatherford Curling Classic, and making the playoffs in three Slams, including losing in the final of the 2014 Canadian Open of Curling. The team also won the 2015 SaskTel Tankard, qualifying them again to represent Saskatchewan at the Brier. At the 2015 Tim Hortons Brier, the team made the playoffs after posting a 7-4 round robin record. After losing to Team Canada in the 3 vs. 4 game (skipped by Pat Simmons), they went on to beat Newfoundland and Labrador (Brad Gushue) in the bronze medal game.

The 2015-16 season was another successful season for the rink. The team won the Canad Inns Men's Classic and won the 2016 SaskTel Tankard, earning another trip to the Brier.

== Personal life ==
Muyres is the son of Lyle Muyres, who skipped Team Saskatchewan at the 1986 Labatt Brier. He is employed as a CAD/Design Technologist with the Saskatchewan Research Council and is married His brother is his former skip, Kirk Muyres.
