= Roger Korte =

Canadian curler

Roger Korte (born October 11, 1970) is a Canadian curler from Saskatoon, Saskatchewan. He is a three-time provincial champion.

Korte is a long-time member of his brother, Bruce's rink, playing every position for him except skip. In 2009, team mate Darell McKee took over the reins. Roger played in both the 2000 and 2004 Briers as Bruce's second. In 2010, he played second for McKee.

Korte was also the team's second when they won a Grand Slam title in 2002, winning the Masters of Curling.
