= Dustin Kidby =

Canadian curler

- Curler
- Born: May 26, 1985 (age 41); Regina, Saskatchewan, Canada

Team
- Curling club: Wadena RE/MAX CC, Wadena, SK
- Skip: Kelly Knapp
- Third: Brennen Jones
- Second: Dustin Kidby
- Lead: Mat Ring
- Alternate: Trent Knapp

Curling career
- Member Association: Saskatchewan
- Brier: 6 (2017, 2020, 2021, 2022, 2023, 2026)
- Top CTRS ranking: 7th (2018–19; 2019–20)
- Grand Slam victories: 1 (2019 Masters)
Medal record
Men's curling
Representing Canada
World Junior Curling Championships
Gold medal – first place	2005 Pinerolo
Representing Saskatchewan
Tim Hortons Brier
Bronze medal – third place	2020 Kingston
Bronze medal – third place	2021 Calgary

Dustin "Deuce" Kidby (born May 26, 1985) is a Canadian curler from Regina, Saskatchewan. He currently plays second on Team Kelly Knapp. He previously threw lead rocks for Team Matt Dunstone.

== Career ==
=== Juniors ===
Kidby represented Saskatchewan at two Canadian Junior Curling Championships. The first was the 2002 Canadian Juniors, playing lead for Team Kyle George. They finished the event with a 7–5 record. George won the Canadian Juniors in 2005 (without Kidby), but invited him to be the alternate for Team Canada at the 2005 World Junior Curling Championships. The team won the gold medal at the event, and Kidby would play in two matches. Kidby returned to the Canadian Juniors in 2006, playing lead for Team Mitch Heidt. This team also finished with a 7–5 record. In university, Kidby played second for the University of Regina, on a team skipped by Byron Moffatt. The team won the bronze medal at the 2008 CIS/CCA Curling Championships.

=== Men's ===
Kidby joined the Brad Heidt rink in 2008, playing two season as the team's lead. In their first season, the team played in the 2009 Players' Championship, Kidby's first Grand Slam event, where they won just one game. The next season, Kidby picked up his first World Curling Tour event win as a member of the team, at the Point Optical Curling Classic.

For the 2011-12 curling season, Kidby played lead for the Braeden Moskowy rink, with whom he would win another event, the November 2011 DeKalb Superspiel.

Kidby joined the Josh Heidt team in 2012, playing four seasons as the team's lead. During this period, the team won two events, the 2014 Red Deer Curling Classic and the 2015 Weatherford Curling Classic. Kidby played in the March 2014 National Grand Slam event playing lead for Team Brock Virtue, finishing the event winless.

In 2016, Kidby joined Team Adam Casey for two seasons, again playing lead. The team won the 2017 SaskTel Tankard, the provincial men's championship for Saskatchewan. They would go on to represent Saskatchewan at the 2017 Tim Hortons Brier, where they went 5–6. The next season, the team played in the 2017 Olympic Pre-Trials, going 2–4.

In 2018, Kidby joined the Matt Dunstone rink, playing lead. In this first season, the team won three World Curling Tour events, the Prestige Hotels & Resorts Curling Classic, the DeKalb Superspiel and the Qinghai Curling Elite, as well as the third leg of the 2018-19 Curling World Cup. The team also played in a number of Grand Slam events, making it to the quarterfinals of the 2018 Masters, and qualifying for the 2018 Tour Challenge and the 2019 Canadian Open. They also played in the 2018 Canada Cup, finishing 1–5.

In their first event of the 2019-20 season, Team Dunstone finished runner-up at the Stu Sells Oakville Tankard to John Epping. Dunstone also won his first career Grand Slam at the 2019 Masters where he defeated Brad Gushue in the final. They fell into a slump after their huge win at the slam, not able to qualify at the Tour Challenge, National or Canadian Open and finishing winless at the 2019 Canada Cup. They were able to turn things around at the 2020 SaskTel Tankard. After falling into the C Event, Team Dunstone won four straight games including defeating Kirk Muyres in the final to win the provincial championship. At the 2020 Tim Hortons Brier, they finished the round robin and championship pool with a 8–3 record which qualified them for the 1 vs. 2 game against Alberta's Brendan Bottcher. They lost the game 9–4 and then lost the semifinal to Newfoundland and Labrador's Gushue, settling for a bronze medal. It would be the team's last event of the season as both the Players' Championship and the Champions Cup Grand Slam events were cancelled due to the COVID-19 pandemic. After the season, Team Dunstone added Kirk Muyres to their team, replacing Catlin Schneider at second.

Due to the COVID-19 pandemic in Saskatchewan, the 2021 provincial championship was cancelled. As the reigning provincial champions, Team Dunstone was invited to represent Saskatchewan at the 2021 Tim Hortons Brier, which they accepted. At the Brier, they finished the round robin and championship pool with a 9–3 record, qualifying for the playoffs as the second seed. Facing Brendan Bottcher in the semifinal, they lost 6–5 after Bottcher made a runback to score two in the tenth end. Team Dunstone would have to settle for the bronze medal for a second straight year.

== Personal life ==
Kidby works as Group Benefits Underwriting Consultant. Kidby is openly gay. His brother is D. J. Kidby and is the cousin of Ben Hebert.
