= Braeden Moskowy =

Canadian curler

- Curler
- Born: August 14, 1990 (age 36); Regina, Saskatchewan

Team
- Curling club: Highland CC, Regina, SK

Curling career
- Member Association: Manitoba (2014–2018); Saskatchewan (2018–present)
- Brier: 6 (2013, 2015, 2018, 2020, 2021, 2022)
- Top CTRS ranking: 2nd (2016–17)
- Grand Slam victories: 2 (2016 Champions Cup, 2019 Masters)
Medal record
Representing Saskatchewan
Tim Hortons Brier
Bronze medal – third place	2020 Kingston
Bronze medal – third place	2021 Calgary

Braeden Moskowy (born August 14, 1990) is a Canadian curler from Regina, Saskatchewan. He is a Canadian junior curling champion and a six-time Brier competitor.

== Career ==
Moskowy has represented Saskatchewan in two Canadian Junior Curling Championships: skipping the province in 2010 and 2011. At the 2010 Canadian Junior Curling Championships, he lost in the semi-final to Ontario's Jake Walker. At the 2011 Canadian Junior Curling Championships, Moskowy finished 12–0 in the round robin advancing to the final. In the final Moskowy beat Ontario's Mathew Camm to finish the week a perfect 13–0. Moskowy became the 5th team in Canadian Junior history to go undefeated. This qualified the Moskowy rink to represent Canada at the 2011 World Junior Curling Championships where the team went on to lose the semi-final as well as the bronze medal game, settling for fourth place.

Moskowy played in his first Grand Slam event at the 2011 Players' Championship, in which his rink became the first junior team to ever qualify at a Grand Slam event. In 2013, he qualified for his first Brier after winning the 2013 SaskTel Tankard 6–4 over Bruce Korte. At the Brier, Saskatchewan went 5–6 in the round robin, missing the playoffs. In 2014, Moskowy moved to Manitoba and joined the Reid Carruthers rink. With the Carruthers rink, Moskowy represented Manitoba at two Briers, in 2015 and in 2018. In 2015, the team went 4–7, missing the playoffs. In 2018, the team qualified for the Championship Pool with a 5–2 record before losing all four of their next games finishing the event with a 5–6 record. Moskowy also won his first Grand Slam with team Carruthers, the 2016 Champions Cup.

After the 2017–18 season, Moskowy left the Carruthers rink and moved back to Saskatchewan to join the Matt Dunstone rink. The team was invited to represent Canada at the third leg of the 2018-19 Curling World Cup. The team won the event, defeating Team Sweden's Niklas Edin rink in the final.

In their first event of the 2019–20 season, Team Dunstone finished runner-up at the Stu Sells Oakville Tankard to John Epping. Dunstone also won his first career Grand Slam at the 2019 Masters where he defeated Brad Gushue in the final. They fell into a slump after their huge win at the slam, not able to qualify at the Tour Challenge, National or Canadian Open and finishing winless at the 2019 Canada Cup. They were able to turn things around at the 2020 SaskTel Tankard. After falling into the C Event, Team Dunstone won four straight games including defeating Kirk Muyres in the final to win the provincial championship. At the 2020 Tim Hortons Brier, they finished the round robin and championship pool with a 8–3 record which qualified them for the 1 vs. 2 game against Alberta's Brendan Bottcher. They lost the game 9–4 and then lost the semifinal to Newfoundland and Labrador's Gushue, settling for a bronze medal. It would be the team's last event of the season as both the Players' Championship and the Champions Cup Grand Slam events were cancelled due to the COVID-19 pandemic. After the season, Team Dunstone added Kirk Muyres to their team, replacing Catlin Schneider at second.

Due to the COVID-19 pandemic in Saskatchewan, the 2021 provincial championship was cancelled. As the reigning provincial champions, Team Dunstone was invited to represent Saskatchewan at the 2021 Tim Hortons Brier, which they accepted. At the Brier, they finished the round robin and championship pool with a 9–3 record, qualifying for the playoffs as the second seed. Facing Brendan Bottcher in the semifinal, they lost 6–5 after Bottcher made a runback to score two in the tenth end. Team Dunstone would have to settle for the bronze medal for a second straight year.

Moskowy was replaced by Colton Lott at the 2021 Canadian Olympic Curling Trials, citing "personal reasons", with no further details revealed. He returned to the team for their run at the 2022 Tim Hortons Brier. Following the season, the team broke up.

== Personal life ==
In addition to being a professional curler, Moskowy is Canada wide mortgage broker with TMG (The Mortgage Group). Moskowy's dad, Kelly, represented Saskatchewan at the 2002 Nokia Brier.
