= Brennen Jones =

Canadian curler

Brennan Jones
- Curler
- Born: April 25, 1987 (age 39); Weyburn, Saskatchewan, Canada

Team
- Skip: Kelly Knapp
- Third: Brennen Jones
- Second: Dustin Kidby
- Lead: Mat Ring
- Alternate: Trent Knapp

Curling career
- Member Association: Saskatchewan
- Brier: 3 (2011, 2023, 2026)

Brennen Ray Jones (born April 25, 1987) is a Canadian curler from Regina, Saskatchewan. He is a three-time provincial junior champion and a three-time provincial men's champion.

In 2004, Jones represented Saskatchewan as skip at the 2004 Optimist U-18 Curling Championships. The team went undefeated throughout the event and won gold.

In 2006, playing third for Mitch Heidt, Jones won his first provincial junior championship qualifying him for the 2006 Canadian Junior Curling Championships. Saskatchewan missed the playoffs, finishing with a 7–5 round robin record.

In 2008, Jones skipped his own team to his second provincial junior championship. His Saskatchewan rink finished the round robin at the 2008 Canadian Junior Curling Championships with a 9–3 record. This put him in a tie-breaker against Ontario (skipped by Travis Fanset) which he lost.

In university, Jones played third for the University of Regina, on a team skipped by Byron Moffatt. The team won the bronze medal at the 2008 CIS/CCA Curling Championships. Jones then skipped a team in the 2010 CIS/CCA Curling Championships.

From 2007 to 2009, outside junior competition, Jones played second for Brad Heidt in numerous World Curling Tour events. Jones left to form his own team before joining Pat Simmons' team in 2010. Jones played second in his first Brier in 2011 with Pat Simmons with a 4-7 record. Jones went on to play second for Randy Bryden from 2013-2015 winning numerous events on the WCT. Jones then took time away from the game, coming back to play with Kelly Knapp from 2020 to 2026. Jones then played third for Kelly Knapp in the 2023 Brier with a 4-4 record just missing the championship pool playoffs. Jones is also playing in the 2026 Brier with Kelly Knapp.

== Personal life ==
Jones is married and has two children. He works as a claims construction specialist with SGI Canada.
