= Ed Werenich Golden Wrench Classic =

World Curling Tour event

The Ed Werenich Golden Wrench Classic is an annual bonspiel on the men's World Curling Tour. It is held annually in January at the Coyotes Curling Club in Tempe, Arizona. The event is named for two-time World Champion Ed Werenich.

== Past champions ==
Year	Winning team	Runner up team	Purse (USD)	Winner's share (CAD)
2016	(Alberta) Pat Simmons, John Morris, Carter Rycroft, Nolan Thiessen	(British Columbia) Jim Cotter, Ryan Kuhn, Tyrel Griffith, Rick Sawatsky	$17,000	$9,861
2017	(Manitoba) Mike McEwen, B. J. Neufeld, Matt Wozniak, Denni Neufeld	(Saskatchewan) Adam Casey, Catlin Schneider, Shaun Meachem, Dustin Kidby	$16,000	$7,994
2018	(Manitoba) Mike McEwen, B. J. Neufeld, Matt Wozniak, Denni Neufeld	(Saskatchewan) Steve Laycock, Matt Dunstone, Kirk Muyres, Dallan Muyres	$16,000	$7,460
2019	(Manitoba) Reid Carruthers, Mike McEwen, Denni Neufeld, Matt Wozniak	(Saskatchewan) Kirk Muyres, Kevin Marsh, Dan Marsh, Dallan Muyres	$18,700	$8,541
2020	(Manitoba) Jason Gunnlaugson, Alex Forrest, Adam Casey, Connor Njegovan	(Minnesota) Greg Persinger (Fourth), Rich Ruohonen (Skip), Colin Hufman, Phil Tilker	$22,000	$10,438
2021–22	Cancelled			
2023	(Alberta) Karsten Sturmay, Kyle Doering, Kurtis Goller, Glenn Venance	(Manitoba) Reid Carruthers, Derek Samagalski, Connor Njegovan (3 player team)	$22,000	$7,968
2024	(Alberta) Karsten Sturmay, Kyle Doering, Glenn Venance, Kurtis Goller	(Minnesota) John Shuster, Christopher Plys, Matt Hamilton, John Landsteiner	$14,400	$8,062
2025	(Ontario) John Epping, Jake Horgan, Tanner Horgan, Ian McMillan	(Minnesota) John Shuster, Christopher Plys, Matt Hamilton, John Landsteiner	$24,000	$14,428
2026	(Manitoba) Jordon McDonald, Jacques Gauthier, Elias Huminicki, Cameron Olafson	(Saskatchewan) Rylan Kleiter, Joshua Mattern, Matthew Hall, Trevor Johnson	$24,000	
