= 2022 SaskTel Tankard =

- Host city: Whitewood, Saskatchewan
- Arena: Whitewood Curling Club
- Dates: February 9–13
- Winner: Team Flasch
- Curling club: Nutana CC, Saskatoon
- Skip: Colton Flasch
- Third: Catlin Schneider
- Second: Kevin Marsh
- Lead: Dan Marsh
- Finalist: Matt Dunstone

The 2022 SaskTel Tankard, the provincial men's curling championship for Saskatchewan, was held from February 9 to February 13 at the Whitewood Curling Club in Whitewood, Saskatchewan. The winning Colton Flasch rink represented Saskatchewan at the 2022 Tim Hortons Brier in Lethbridge, Alberta, Canada's national men's curling championship.

The event was originally going to be played at the Cooperators Centre in Regina, Saskatchewan but was moved to Whitewood due to COVID-19 concerns. The event was awarded to Regina in July 2021, after the 2021 event was cancelled due to the COVID-19 pandemic in Saskatchewan. Its the second time Whitewood has hosted the Tankard. It had previously held it in 2019.

== Qualification process ==
12 teams qualified for the event. Eight teams pre-qualified for the event based on the CTRS points as of January 10, 2022, with the top 4 earning spots based on points earned on SaskTour and World Curling Tour events held in Saskatchewan and the remaining four next best teams earning the next four spots. The remaining four teams qualified through the SaskTel Last Chance Event held January 20 to 23 at the Nutana Curling Club in Saskatoon, and featured 19 teams after two withdrew.

Qualification method	Berths	Qualifying team(s)
Sask CTRS Leaders	8	Matt Dunstone; Colton Flasch; Kody Hartung; Ryan Deis; Jason Jacobson; Kelly Knapp; Shaun Meachem; Rylan Kleiter
Last Chance Qualifier	4	Brent Gedak; Daymond Bernath; Michael Carss; Josh Heidt

== Teams ==
The teams are listed as follows:

Skip	Third	Second	Lead	Alternate	Club
Daymond Bernath	Bryden Tessier	David Baum	Jack Reid		Sutherland CC, Saskatoon
Michael Carss	Tyler Travis	Aaron Shutra	Lyndon Holm		Nutana CC, Saskatoon
Ryan Deis	Garret Springer	Dustin Mikush	Kalin Deis	Dallan Muyres	Fox Valley CC, Fox Valley
Matt Dunstone	Braeden Moskowy	Kirk Muyres	Dustin Kidby		Highland CC, Regina
Colton Flasch	Catlin Schneider	Kevin Marsh	Dan Marsh		Nutana CC, Saskatoon
Brent Gedak	Jason Ackerman	Derek Owens	Curtis Horwath		Highland CC, Regina
Kody Hartung	Tyler Hartung	Jayden Shwaga	Brady Kendel		Langenburg CC, Langenburg
Josh Heidt	Drew Heidt	Matt Lang	Tyler Gamble		Kerrobert CC, Kerrobert
Jason Jacobson	Dustin Kalthoff	Jacob Hersikorn	Quinn Hersikorn	Darrell McKee	Nutana CC, Saskatoon
Rylan Kleiter	Joshua Mattern	Trevor Johnson	Matthieu Taillon		Sutherland CC, Saskatoon
Kelly Knapp	Brennen Jones	Mike Armstrong	Trent Knapp		Highland CC, Regina
Shaun Meachem	Brady Scharback	Brayden Stewart	Jared Latos	Jeff Chambers	Swift Current CC, Swift Current

== World rankings ==
Team rankings on the World Curling Team Ranking as of Week 29 of the 2021–22 curling season:

Rank	Skip
8	Matt Dunstone
17	Colton Flasch
23	Kody Hartung
39	Ryan Deis
41	Jason Jacobson
51	Shaun Meachem
54	Kelly Knapp
58	Daymond Bernath
60	Rylan Kleiter
67	Michael Carss
82	Brent Gedak (Team Jason Ackerman)
161	Josh Heidt

== Knockout brackets ==
=== A event ===
First Knockout	Qualifier 1
Matt Dunstone	6
Brent Gedak	3	Rylan Kleiter	5
Rylan Kleiter	8	Matt Dunstone	10
Shaun Meachem	2
Jason Jacobson	4
Shaun Meachem	10	Shaun Meachem	7
Michael Carss	7	Matt Dunstone	8
Colton Flasch	5
Colton Flasch	9
Ryan Deis	5	Daymond Bernath	6
Daymond Bernath	8	Colton Flasch	9
Kody Hartung	1
Kody Hartung	9
Josh Heidt	8	Josh Heidt	3
Kelly Knapp	4

=== B event ===
Second Knockout	Qualifier 2
Brent Gedak	7
Jason Jacobson	9	Jason Jacobson	4
Kody Hartung	5
Kody Hartung	8
Michael Carss	4	Daymond Bernath	5
Daymond Bernath	8	Daymond Bernath	8
Shaun Meachem	7
Kody Hartung	8
Ryan Deis	8	Kelly Knapp	7
Josh Heidt	6	Ryan Deis	5
Kelly Knapp	10	Kelly Knapp	7
Rylan Kleiter	3	Kelly Knapp	8
Colton Flasch	7

=== C event ===
Third Knockout				Qualifier 3
		Colton Flasch	11
Brent Gedak	8	Brent Gedak	4
Michael Carss	1			Colton Flasch	10
				Ryan Deis	1
		Ryan Deis	8
		Daymond Bernath	7

Third Knockout	Qualifier 4
Josh Heidt	5
Kelly Knapp	5
Jason Jacobson	7
Jason Jacobson	6	Jason Jacobson	7
Shaun Meachem	4
Rylan Kleiter	1
Shaun Meachem	7

== Knockout results ==
All draw times listed in Central Time (UTC−06:00).

=== Draw 1 ===
Wednesday, February 9, 7:30 pm

Sheet 1	1	2	3	4	5	6	7	8	9	10	Final
Josh Heidt	2	1	0	1	1	2	0	0	1	X	8
Kelly Knapp	0	0	2	0	0	0	1	1	0	X	4

Sheet 2	1	2	3	4	5	6	7	8	9	10	Final
Brent Gedak	0	0	1	0	0	1	0	1	X	X	3
Rylan Kleiter	2	0	0	2	1	0	3	0	X	X	8

Sheet 3	1	2	3	4	5	6	7	8	9	10	Final
Ryan Deis	0	0	0	0	1	0	0	3	1	0	5
Daymond Bernath	0	0	1	0	0	3	1	0	0	3	8

Sheet 4	1	2	3	4	5	6	7	8	9	10	Final
Shaun Meachem	0	1	0	3	5	0	1	0	0	X	10
Michael Carss	1	0	1	0	0	2	0	2	1	X	7

=== Draw 2 ===
Thursday, February 10, 10:00 am

Sheet 1	1	2	3	4	5	6	7	8	9	10	Final
Colton Flasch	0	0	3	0	1	0	2	0	3	X	9
Daymond Bernath	1	0	0	2	0	1	0	2	0	X	6

Sheet 2	1	2	3	4	5	6	7	8	9	10	Final
Jason Jacobson	1	0	1	0	1	0	1	0	0	0	4
Shaun Meachem	0	1	0	1	0	2	0	1	1	1	7

Sheet 3	1	2	3	4	5	6	7	8	9	10	Final
Kody Hartung	0	0	2	0	0	2	0	4	1	X	9
Josh Heidt	0	0	0	0	2	0	1	0	0	X	3

Sheet 4	1	2	3	4	5	6	7	8	9	10	Final
Matt Dunstone	0	0	1	0	1	0	0	0	3	1	6
Rylan Kleiter	0	0	0	1	0	1	1	2	0	0	5

=== Draw 3 ===
Thursday, February 10, 3:00 pm

Sheet 1	1	2	3	4	5	6	7	8	9	10	Final
Brent Gedak	1	0	1	0	3	0	0	2	0	0	7
Jason Jacobson	0	2	0	1	0	3	1	0	1	1	9

Sheet 3	1	2	3	4	5	6	7	8	9	10	Final
Michael Carss	0	0	1	0	0	1	0	2	0	X	4
Daymond Bernath	0	2	0	1	2	0	1	0	2	X	8

=== Draw 4 ===
Thursday, February 10, 7:30 pm

Sheet 1	1	2	3	4	5	6	7	8	9	10	Final
Matt Dunstone	2	0	4	0	4	X	X	X	X	X	10
Shaun Meachem	0	1	0	1	0	X	X	X	X	X	2

Sheet 2	1	2	3	4	5	6	7	8	9	10	Final
Colton Flasch	1	0	1	0	3	0	1	3	X	X	9
Kody Hartung	0	0	0	0	0	1	0	0	X	X	1

Sheet 3	1	2	3	4	5	6	7	8	9	10	Final
Kelly Knapp	0	3	2	0	3	2	X	X	X	X	10
Rylan Kleiter	0	0	0	3	0	0	X	X	X	X	3

Sheet 4	1	2	3	4	5	6	7	8	9	10	Final
Ryan Deis	1	0	0	3	0	2	1	1	0	X	8
Josh Heidt	0	1	1	0	1	0	0	0	3	X	6

=== Draw 5 ===
Friday, February 11, 10:00 am

Sheet 2	1	2	3	4	5	6	7	8	9	10	Final
Daymond Bernath	0	1	0	1	0	2	0	3	0	1	8
Shaun Meachem	1	0	2	0	2	0	1	0	1	0	7

Sheet 4	1	2	3	4	5	6	7	8	9	10	Final
Jason Jacobson	0	0	0	0	0	1	0	2	1	0	4
Kody Hartung	0	1	2	0	1	0	1	0	0	0	5

=== Draw 6 ===
Friday, February 11, 3:00 pm

Sheet 2	1	2	3	4	5	6	7	8	9	10	Final
Ryan Deis	0	1	0	2	1	0	1	0	0	0	5
Kelly Knapp	0	0	1	0	0	2	0	2	0	2	7

Sheet 3	1	2	3	4	5	6	7	8	9	10	Final
Matt Dunstone	0	1	0	2	2	0	1	1	0	1	8
Colton Flasch	0	0	4	0	0	1	0	0	0	0	5

Sheet 4	1	2	3	4	5	6	7	8	9	10	Final
Brent Gedak	1	3	0	1	3	X	X	X	X	X	8
Michael Carss	0	0	1	0	0	X	X	X	X	X	1

=== Draw 7 ===
Friday, February 11, 7:30 pm

Sheet 1	1	2	3	4	5	6	7	8	9	10	Final
Kelly Knapp	0	1	1	0	2	0	0	1	0	3	8
Colton Flasch	1	0	0	2	0	0	2	0	2	0	7

Sheet 2	1	2	3	4	5	6	7	8	9	10	Final
Josh Heidt	1	0	1	2	0	0	1	0	0	X	5
Jason Jacobson	0	2	0	0	1	2	0	0	2	X	7

Sheet 3	1	2	3	4	5	6	7	8	9	10	Final
Kody Hartung	0	0	1	0	3	0	2	0	2	X	8
Daymond Bernath	1	1	0	1	0	1	0	1	0	X	5

Sheet 4	1	2	3	4	5	6	7	8	9	10	Final
Rylan Kleiter	0	0	0	0	1	0	0	0	0	X	1
Shaun Meachem	1	0	2	1	0	0	1	1	1	X	7

=== Draw 8 ===
Saturday, February 12, 10:00 am

Sheet 1	1	2	3	4	5	6	7	8	9	10	Final
Jason Jacobson	1	1	0	0	1	1	0	1	0	1	6
Shaun Meachem	0	0	2	0	0	0	1	0	1	0	4

Sheet 2	1	2	3	4	5	6	7	8	9	10	11	Final
Kody Hartung	0	0	2	0	1	0	2	0	2	0	1	8
Kelly Knapp	1	0	0	1	0	2	0	1	0	2	0	7

Sheet 3	1	2	3	4	5	6	7	8	9	10	Final
Brent Gedak	0	0	2	0	2	0	X	X	X	X	4
Colton Flasch	2	4	0	2	0	3	X	X	X	X	11

Sheet 4	1	2	3	4	5	6	7	8	9	10	Final
Ryan Deis	1	1	0	1	0	1	0	0	0	4	8
Daymond Bernath	0	0	1	0	2	0	1	1	2	0	7

=== Draw 9 ===
Saturday, February 12, 3:00 pm

Sheet 2	1	2	3	4	5	6	7	8	9	10	Final
Colton Flasch	1	1	3	0	2	1	2	X	X	X	10
Ryan Deis	0	0	0	1	0	0	0	X	X	X	1

Sheet 3	1	2	3	4	5	6	7	8	9	10	Final
Jason Jacobson	2	0	0	0	1	0	2	1	0	1	7
Kelly Knapp	0	1	1	0	0	1	0	0	2	0	5

== Playoffs ==
Page playoff system
A	Matt Dunstone	7
B	Kody Hartung	2
C1	Colton Flasch	10
C2	Jason Jacobson	5

Semifinal
B	Kody Hartung	2
C1	Colton Flasch	5

Final
A	Matt Dunstone	4
C1	Colton Flasch	6

=== 1 vs. 2 ===
Saturday, February 12, 7:30 pm

Sheet 3	1	2	3	4	5	6	7	8	9	10	Final
Matt Dunstone	0	1	4	0	0	1	0	1	X	X	7
Kody Hartung	0	0	0	1	0	0	1	0	X	X	2

=== 3 vs. 4 ===
Saturday, February 12, 7:30 pm

Sheet 1	1	2	3	4	5	6	7	8	9	10	Final
Colton Flasch	0	2	1	0	3	3	0	1	X	X	10
Jacob Jacobson	1	0	0	2	0	0	2	0	X	X	5

=== Semifinal ===
Sunday, February 13, 10:00 am

Sheet 2	1	2	3	4	5	6	7	8	9	10	Final
Kody Hartung	0	0	1	0	1	0	0	0	0	X	2
Colton Flasch	0	0	0	1	0	1	0	0	3	X	5

=== Final ===
Sunday, February 13, 3:00 pm

Sheet 3	1	2	3	4	5	6	7	8	9	10	Final
Matt Dunstone	0	0	0	2	0	1	1	0	0	0	4
Colton Flasch	0	0	1	0	3	0	0	0	1	1	6

2022 SaskTel Tankard

Colton Flasch
4th Saskatchewan Provincial Championship title
