= 2020 SaskTel Tankard =

- Host city: Melville, Saskatchewan
- Arena: Horizon Credit Union Centre
- Dates: January 29 – February 2
- Winner: Team Dunstone
- Curling club: Highland CC, Regina
- Skip: Matt Dunstone
- Third: Braeden Moskowy
- Second: Catlin Schneider
- Lead: Dustin Kidby
- Finalist: Kirk Muyres

The 2020 SaskTel Tankard, the provincial men's curling championship for Saskatchewan, was held from January 29 to February 2 at the Horizon Credit Union Centre in Melville, Saskatchewan. The winning Matt Dunstone rink represented Saskatchewan at the 2020 Tim Hortons Brier in Kingston, Ontario, Canada's national men's curling championship.

Matt Dunstone won his 2nd SaskTel Tankard when he defeated former teammate Kirk Muyres 4–2 in the final.

== Teams ==
The teams are listed as follows:

Skip	Third	Second	Lead	Alternate	Club
Ryan Deis	Scott Manners	Jason Barnhart	Kalin Deis		Fox Valley CC, Fox Valley
Matt Dunstone	Braeden Moskowy	Catlin Schneider	Dustin Kidby		Highland CC, Regina
Lloyd Fell	Robert Bakken	Trevor Gerein	Brennan Schiele	Curtis Bowker	Unity CC, Unity
Benjamin Gamble	Braydan Mohns	Tyler Krupski	Rory McCusker		Highland CC, Regina
Brent Gedak	Jason Ackerman	Derek Owens	Curtis Horwath		Estevan CC, Estevan
Jeff Hartung	Jason Krupski	Jeremy Chevrier	Chad Petracek	Austin Krupski	Langenburg CC, Langenburg
Kody Hartung	Tyler Hartung	Jayden Shwaga	Mark Larsen		Langenburg CC, Langenburg
Brad Heidt	Mark Lang	Glen Heitt	Dan Ormsby		Kerrobert CC, Kerrobert
Josh Heidt	Brock Montgomery	Kelly Knapp	Trent Knapp		Kerrobert CC, Kerrobert
Steve Howard	Dan Selke	Mat Ring	Scott Deck	Russ Howard	Highland CC, Regina
Jason Jacobson	Dustin Kalthoff	Garret Springer	Drew Springer		Nutana CC, Saskatoon
Brady Kendel	Jacob Hersikorn	Quinn Hersikorn	Brandon Leippi		Sutherland CC, Saskatoon
Shaun Meachem	Brady Scharback	Brayden Stewart	Jared Latos	Jeff Chambers	Nutana CC, Saskatoon
Kirk Muyres	Kevin Marsh	Dan Marsh	Dallan Muyres		Nutana CC, Saskatoon
Cole Tenetuik	Brennan Schiele	Mathew Taylor	Chadd McKenzie		Twin Rivers CC, North Battleford
Sam Wills	Grady LaMontagne	Blake Hoffman	Brody Blackwell		Highland CC, Regina

== Knockout Draw Brackets ==
=== A Event ===
First Knockout	Qualifier 1
Matt Dunstone	8
Lloyd Fell	2
Matt Dunstone	9
Josh Heidt	3
Josh Heidt	11
Steve Howard	8
Matt Dunstone	9
Kody Hartung	3
Kody Hartung	8
Brad Heidt	5
Kody Hartung	9
Jason Jacobson	8
Jason Jacobson	8
Cole Tenetuik	4
Matt Dunstone	6
Kirk Muyres	7
Sam Wills	1
Shaun Meachem	7
Shaun Meachem	5
Jeff Hartung	3
Brent Gedak	5
Jeff Hartung	8
Shaun Meachem	2
Kirk Muyres	8
Brady Kendel	5
Ryan Deis	4
Brady Kendel	2
Kirk Muyres	7
Benjamin Gamble	5
Kirk Muyres	9

=== B Event ===
Second Knockout	Qualifier 2
Lloyd Fell	5
Steve Howard	7	Steve Howard	5
Jason Jacobson	10
Jason Jacobson	8
Shaun Meachem	4
Jason Jacobson	4
Sam Wills	3	Kody Hartung	6
Brent Gedak	13	Brent Gedak	8
Brady Kendel	7
Brent Gedak	5
Kody Hartung	6
Kody Hartung	6
Brad Heidt	6	Matt Dunstone	5
Cole Tenetuik	8	Cole Tenetuik	1
Josh Heidt	9
Josh Heidt	9
Ryan Deis	5	Ryan Deis	6
Benjamin Gamble	4	Ryan Deis	9
Jeff Hartung	7
Josh Heidt	3
Matt Dunstone	10

=== C Event ===
Third Knockout	Qualifier 3
1	Josh Heidt	11
4	Brent Gedak	9	Brent Gedak	9
5	Lloyd Fell	7	Brad Heidt	3	Josh Heidt	5
8	Brad Heidt	8	Jason Jacobson	6
2	Jason Jacobson	10
3	Ryan Deis	2	Steve Howard	8
6	Steve Howard	9	Steve Howard	8
7	Brady Kendel	6

Third Knockout	Qualifier 4
Shaun Meachem	8
Sam Wills	4	Benjamin Gamble	3	Matt Dunstone	7
Benjamin Gamble	6	Shaun Meachem	9	Shaun Meachem	6
Cole Tenetuik	6
Cole Tenetuik	6
Jeff Hartung	4

== Playoffs ==
Page playoff system
A	Kirk Muyres	7
B	Kody Hartung	1
C1	Jason Jacobson	4
C2	Matt Dunstone	7

Semifinal
B	Kody Hartung	4
C2	Matt Dunstone	6

Final
A	Kirk Muyres	2
C2	Matt Dunstone	4

=== A vs. B ===
Saturday, February 1, 7:00 pm

Sheet 2	1	2	3	4	5	6	7	8	9	10	Final
Kirk Muyres	0	2	0	0	2	1	2	X	X	X	7
Kody Hartung	0	0	0	1	0	0	0	X	X	X	1

=== C1 vs. C2 ===
Saturday, February 1, 7:00 pm

Sheet 1	1	2	3	4	5	6	7	8	9	10	Final
Jason Jacobson	0	1	0	0	1	0	1	1	0	X	4
Matt Dunstone	3	0	2	1	0	1	0	0	0	X	7

=== Semifinal ===
Saturday, February 2, 9:30 am

Sheet 3	1	2	3	4	5	6	7	8	9	10	Final
Kody Hartung	1	0	1	0	1	0	0	1	0	0	4
Matt Dunstone	0	2	0	1	0	2	0	0	0	1	6

=== Final ===
Sunday, February 2, 2:30 pm

Sheet 2	1	2	3	4	5	6	7	8	9	10	Final
Kirk Muyres	1	0	0	0	0	1	0	0	0	X	2
Matt Dunstone	0	0	0	2	0	0	0	0	2	X	4

2020 Saskatchewan Men's Curling Championship

Matt Dunstone
2nd Saskatchewan Provincial Championship title
