= 2022 Players' Championship =

Grand Slam of Curling event

- Host city: Toronto, Ontario
- Arena: Mattamy Athletic Centre
- Dates: April 12–17
- Men's winner: (Scotland) Team Mouat
- Curling club: Gogar Park CC, Edinburgh
- Skip: Bruce Mouat
- Third: Grant Hardie
- Second: Bobby Lammie
- Lead: Hammy McMillan Jr.
- Coach: Alan Hannah
- Finalist: (Sweden) Niklas Edin
- Women's winner: (Sweden) Team Hasselborg
- Curling club: Sundbybergs CK, Sundbyberg
- Skip: Anna Hasselborg
- Third: Sara McManus
- Second: Agnes Knochenhauer
- Lead: Sofia Mabergs
- Coach: Wayne Middaugh
- Finalist: (Manitoba) Kerri Einarson

The 2022 Princess Auto Players' Championship was held April 12–17 at the Mattamy Athletic Centre in Toronto, Ontario. It was the fourth Grand Slam and final major of the 2021–22 curling season, following the cancellation of the Meridian Open.

Despite feeling ill in the final due to food poisoning, Anna Hasselborg led her team to their seventh Grand Slam title, and completed a career Grand Slam, becoming the first women's team to do so.

== Qualification ==
The top 16 ranked men's and women's teams on the World Curling Federation's world team rankings qualified for the event. In the event that a team declines their invitation, the next-ranked team on the world team ranking is invited until the field is complete.

=== Men ===
Top world team ranking men's teams:

1. (Newfoundland and Labrador) Brad Gushue
2. (Scotland) Bruce Mouat
3. (Alberta) Kevin Koe
4. (Sweden) Niklas Edin
5. (Ontario) Brad Jacobs
6. (Ontario) Glenn Howard
7. (Saskatchewan) Matt Dunstone
8. (Saskatchewan) Colton Flasch
9. (Alberta) Brendan Bottcher
10. (Manitoba) Jason Gunnlaugson
11. (Manitoba) Mike McEwen
12. (Scotland) Ross Whyte
13. (Norway) ~~Steffen Walstad~~
14. (Switzerland) Yannick Schwaller
15. (Switzerland) Marco Hösli
16. (Switzerland) ~~Peter de Cruz~~
17. (Italy) Joël Retornaz
18. (Ontario) John Epping

=== Women ===
Top world team ranking women's teams:

1. (Scotland) Eve Muirhead
2. (Manitoba) Tracy Fleury
3. (Sweden) Anna Hasselborg
4. (Japan) Satsuki Fujisawa
5. (Manitoba) Jennifer Jones
6. (Switzerland) Silvana Tirinzoni
7. (Manitoba) Kerri Einarson
8. (South Korea) ~~Kim Eun-jung~~ (Note: Team Kim Eun-jung initially accepted their invitation to the event, but later withdrew after both second Kim Cho-hi and third Kim Kyeong-ae tested positive for COVID-19. Team Isabella Wranå took their place.)
9. (United States) Tabitha Peterson
10. (Alberta) Laura Walker
11. (Saskatchewan) Chelsea Carey
12. (Ontario) Rachel Homan
13. (Manitoba) Mackenzie Zacharias
14. (Russia) ~~Alina Kovaleva~~
15. (Ontario) Krista McCarville
16. (South Korea) Gim Eun-ji
17. (Germany) Daniela Jentsch
18. (Ontario) ~~Hollie Duncan~~
19. (Sweden) Isabella Wranå

== Men ==
=== Teams ===
The teams are listed as follows:

Skip	Third	Second	Lead	Alternate	Locale
Brendan Bottcher	Pat Janssen	Brad Thiessen	Karrick Martin		Edmonton, Alberta
Matt Dunstone	Braeden Moskowy	Kirk Muyres	Dustin Kidby		Regina, Saskatchewan
Niklas Edin	Oskar Eriksson	Rasmus Wranå	Christoffer Sundgren (DNP)		Karlstad, Sweden
John Epping	Ryan Fry	Mat Camm	Brent Laing		Toronto, Ontario
Colton Flasch	Catlin Schneider	Kevin Marsh	Dan Marsh		Saskatoon, Saskatchewan
Jason Gunnlaugson	Adam Casey	Matt Wozniak	Connor Njegovan		Morris, Manitoba
Brad Gushue	Mark Nichols	Brett Gallant	Geoff Walker		St. John's, Newfoundland and Labrador
Marco Hösli	Philipp Hösli	Marco Hefti	Justin Hausherr		Glarus, Switzerland
Scott Howard	Wayne Middaugh	David Mathers	Tim March	Glenn Howard (DNP)	Penetanguishene, Ontario
Brad Jacobs	Marc Kennedy	E. J. Harnden	Ryan Harnden		Sault Ste. Marie, Ontario
Kevin Koe	B. J. Neufeld	John Morris	Ben Hebert		Calgary, Alberta
Mike McEwen	Reid Carruthers	Derek Samagalski	Colin Hodgson		West St. Paul, Manitoba
Bruce Mouat	Grant Hardie	Bobby Lammie	Hammy McMillan Jr.		Stirling, Scotland
Joël Retornaz	Amos Mosaner	Sebastiano Arman	Simone Gonin		Pinerolo, Italy
Yannick Schwaller	Michael Brunner	Romano Meier	Marcel Käufeler		Bern, Switzerland
Ross Whyte	Robin Brydone	Duncan McFadzean	Euan Kyle		Stirling, Scotland

=== Knockout brackets ===
==== A event ====
A Event	Qualifier 1
1	(Newfoundland and Labrador) Brad Gushue	3
1	(Ontario) John Epping	9	9	(Ontario) John Epping	3
2	(Saskatchewan) Colton Flasch	2	9	(Alberta) Brendan Bottcher	5
2	(Alberta) Brendan Bottcher	7	13	(Alberta) Brendan Bottcher	2
3	(Sweden) Niklas Edin	6	13	(Sweden) Niklas Edin	6
3	(Italy) Joël Retornaz	3	10	(Sweden) Niklas Edin	5
4	(Ontario) Brad Jacobs	5	10	(Manitoba) Mike McEwen	4
4	(Manitoba) Mike McEwen	10

A Event	Qualifier 2
5	(Scotland) Bruce Mouat	7
5	(Switzerland) Marco Hösli	4	11	(Scotland) Bruce Mouat	6
6	(Saskatchewan) Matt Dunstone	7	11	(Saskatchewan) Matt Dunstone	3
6	(Scotland) Ross Whyte	6	14	(Scotland) Bruce Mouat	8
7	(Alberta) Kevin Koe	5	14	(Alberta) Kevin Koe	2
7	(Switzerland) Yannick Schwaller	4	12	(Alberta) Kevin Koe	8
8	(Ontario) Team Howard	3	12	(Manitoba) Jason Gunnlaugson	4
8	(Manitoba) Jason Gunnlaugson	6

==== B event ====
B Event						Qualifier 3
15	(Newfoundland and Labrador) Brad Gushue	10
15	(Saskatchewan) Colton Flasch	3	19	(Newfoundland and Labrador) Brad Gushue	3
16	(Italy) Joël Retornaz	7	19	(Italy) Joël Retornaz	2
16	(Ontario) Brad Jacobs	2				23	(Newfoundland and Labrador) Brad Gushue	7
						23	(Alberta) Kevin Koe	3

B Event						Qualifier 4
17	(Switzerland) Marco Hösli	4
17	(Scotland) Ross Whyte	8	20	(Scotland) Ross Whyte	6
18	(Switzerland) Yannick Schwaller	4	20	(Ontario) Team Howard	4
18	(Ontario) Team Howard	7				24	(Scotland) Ross Whyte	3
						24	(Alberta) Brendan Bottcher	5

B Event			Qualifier 5
21	(Ontario) John Epping	3
21	(Manitoba) Mike McEwen	4	25	(Manitoba) Mike McEwen	2
22	(Saskatchewan) Matt Dunstone	5	25	(Manitoba) Jason Gunnlaugson	4
22	(Manitoba) Jason Gunnlaugson	6

==== C event ====
C Event						Qualifier 6
26	(Saskatchewan) Colton Flasch	4
26	(Ontario) Brad Jacobs	5	28	(Ontario) Brad Jacobs	9
			28	(Ontario) John Epping	3
						31	(Ontario) Brad Jacobs	6
						31	(Scotland) Ross Whyte	3

C Event						Qualifier 7
27	(Switzerland) Marco Hösli	6
27	(Switzerland) Yannick Schwaller	5	29	(Switzerland) Marco Hösli	2
			29	(Saskatchewan) Matt Dunstone	8
						32	(Saskatchewan) Matt Dunstone	5
						32	(Alberta) Kevin Koe	7

C Event			Qualifier 8
30	(Italy) Joël Retornaz	2
30	(Ontario) Team Howard	6	33	(Ontario) Team Howard	2
			33	(Manitoba) Mike McEwen	8

=== Knockout results ===
All draw times are listed in Eastern Time (UTC−04:00).

==== Draw 3 ====
Tuesday, April 12, 3:00 pm

Sheet A	1	2	3	4	5	6	7	8	Final
(Newfoundland and Labrador) Brad Gushue	0	0	0	3	0	0	X	X	3
(Ontario) John Epping 🔨	0	1	1	0	4	3	X	X	9

Sheet B	1	2	3	4	5	6	7	8	Final
(Sweden) Niklas Edin 🔨	0	0	2	1	0	1	0	2	6
(Italy) Joël Retornaz	0	0	0	0	2	0	1	0	3

Sheet C	1	2	3	4	5	6	7	8	Final
(Scotland) Bruce Mouat	0	0	3	1	1	1	1	X	7
(Switzerland) Marco Hösli 🔨	2	2	0	0	0	0	0	X	4

Sheet D	1	2	3	4	5	6	7	8	Final
(Alberta) Kevin Koe 🔨	1	0	0	0	3	0	0	1	5
(Switzerland) Yannick Schwaller	0	0	0	2	0	1	1	0	4

==== Draw 4 ====
Tuesday, April 12, 6:30 pm

Sheet A	1	2	3	4	5	6	7	8	Final
(Saskatchewan) Colton Flasch 🔨	0	1	0	0	1	0	X	X	2
(Alberta) Brendan Bottcher	2	0	3	1	0	1	X	X	7

Sheet B	1	2	3	4	5	6	7	8	Final
(Ontario) Brad Jacobs	0	2	0	0	0	3	0	X	5
(Manitoba) Mike McEwen 🔨	3	0	0	3	1	0	3	X	10

Sheet C	1	2	3	4	5	6	7	8	Final
(Saskatchewan) Matt Dunstone	1	0	2	0	1	0	0	3	7
(Scotland) Ross Whyte 🔨	0	2	0	2	0	2	0	0	6

Sheet D	1	2	3	4	5	6	7	8	Final
(Ontario) Team Howard	0	2	0	1	0	0	0	X	3
(Manitoba) Jason Gunnlaugson 🔨	0	0	1	0	2	1	2	X	6

==== Draw 7 ====
Wednesday, April 13, 4:00 pm

Sheet A	1	2	3	4	5	6	7	8	Final
(Italy) Joël Retornaz 🔨	0	3	1	1	0	0	2	X	7
(Ontario) Brad Jacobs	1	0	0	0	1	0	0	X	2

Sheet B	1	2	3	4	5	6	7	8	Final
(Newfoundland and Labrador) Brad Gushue	0	0	2	0	5	3	X	X	10
(Saskatchewan) Colton Flasch 🔨	1	1	0	1	0	0	X	X	3

Sheet C	1	2	3	4	5	6	7	8	Final
(Switzerland) Yannick Schwaller	0	1	0	0	1	0	2	0	4
(Ontario) Team Howard 🔨	1	0	0	2	0	2	0	2	7

Sheet D	1	2	3	4	5	6	7	8	Final
(Switzerland) Marco Hösli 🔨	1	0	1	0	0	2	0	0	4
(Scotland) Ross Whyte	0	2	0	1	1	0	2	2	8

==== Draw 8 ====
Wednesday, April 13, 8:00 pm

Sheet A	1	2	3	4	5	6	7	8	9	Final
(Sweden) Niklas Edin 🔨	2	0	0	0	1	1	0	0	1	5
(Manitoba) Mike McEwen	0	1	0	2	0	0	0	1	0	4

Sheet B	1	2	3	4	5	6	7	8	Final
(Ontario) John Epping 🔨	0	0	2	0	1	0	0	X	3
(Alberta) Brendan Bottcher	1	1	0	2	0	1	0	X	5

Sheet C	1	2	3	4	5	6	7	8	Final
(Alberta) Kevin Koe 🔨	4	0	0	2	0	2	X	X	8
(Manitoba) Jason Gunnlaugson	0	2	1	0	1	0	X	X	4

Sheet D	1	2	3	4	5	6	7	8	Final
(Scotland) Bruce Mouat 🔨	3	0	1	1	1	0	X	X	6
(Saskatchewan) Matt Dunstone	0	1	0	0	0	2	X	X	3

==== Draw 9 ====
Thursday, April 14, 8:30 am

Sheet A	1	2	3	4	5	6	7	8	Final
(Scotland) Ross Whyte 🔨	1	0	2	1	1	0	0	1	6
(Ontario) Team Howard	0	2	0	0	0	0	2	0	4

Sheet C	1	2	3	4	5	6	7	8	Final
(Newfoundland and Labrador) Brad Gushue 🔨	1	0	0	1	0	0	0	1	3
(Italy) Joël Retornaz	0	0	0	0	1	0	1	0	2

==== Draw 10 ====
Thursday, April 14, 12:00 pm

Sheet A	1	2	3	4	5	6	7	8	9	Final
(Saskatchewan) Matt Dunstone 🔨	1	0	2	0	0	1	0	1	0	5
(Manitoba) Jason Gunnlaugson	0	0	0	1	2	0	2	0	1	6

Sheet C	1	2	3	4	5	6	7	8	9	Final
(Ontario) John Epping	0	0	1	1	0	0	1	0	0	3
(Manitoba) Mike McEwen 🔨	0	0	0	0	0	1	0	2	1	4

==== Draw 11 ====
Thursday, April 14, 4:00 pm

Sheet A	1	2	3	4	5	6	7	8	Final
(Switzerland) Marco Hösli	1	0	3	0	0	1	0	1	6
(Switzerland) Yannick Schwaller 🔨	0	1	0	2	1	0	1	0	5

Sheet C	1	2	3	4	5	6	7	8	9	Final
(Saskatchewan) Colton Flasch	0	2	0	0	1	0	0	1	0	4
(Ontario) Brad Jacobs 🔨	0	0	1	0	0	3	0	0	1	5

==== Draw 12 ====
Thursday, April 14, 8:00 pm

Sheet B	1	2	3	4	5	6	7	8	Final
(Scotland) Bruce Mouat 🔨	2	1	0	1	0	1	3	X	8
(Alberta) Kevin Koe	0	0	1	0	1	0	0	X	2

Sheet D	1	2	3	4	5	6	7	8	Final
(Alberta) Brendan Bottcher 🔨	0	0	1	0	0	1	X	X	2
(Sweden) Niklas Edin	0	0	0	3	3	0	X	X	6

==== Draw 13 ====
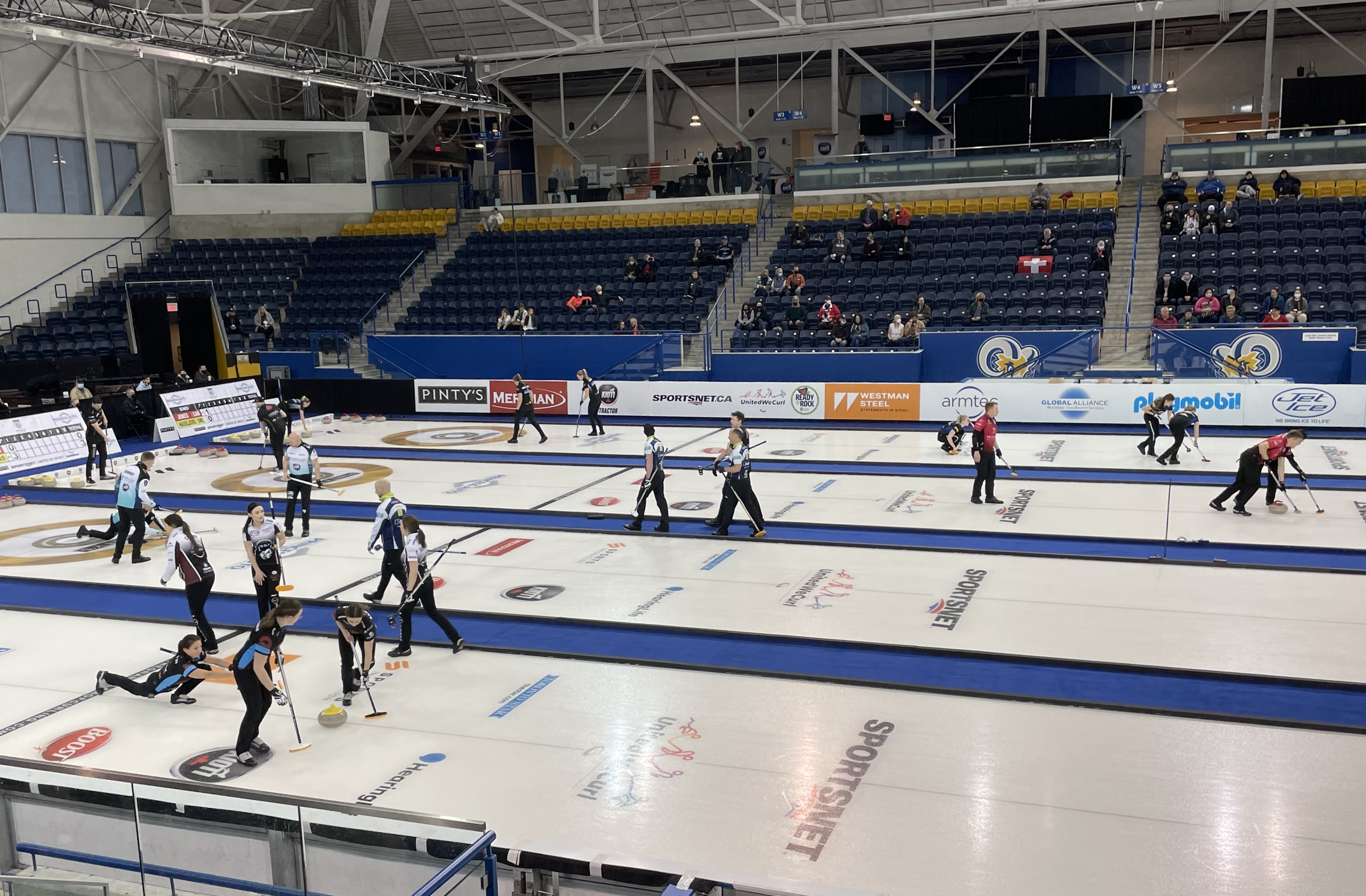
Draw 13 action

Friday, April 15, 8:30 am

Sheet B	1	2	3	4	5	6	7	8	Final
(Ontario) Brad Jacobs 🔨	5	0	2	0	2	X	X	X	9
(Ontario) John Epping	0	1	0	2	0	X	X	X	3

Sheet C	1	2	3	4	5	6	7	8	Final
(Switzerland) Marco Hösli	0	0	0	1	1	0	X	X	2
(Saskatchewan) Matt Dunstone 🔨	3	1	2	0	0	2	X	X	8

==== Draw 15 ====
Friday, April 15, 4:00 pm

Sheet A	1	2	3	4	5	6	7	8	Final
(Newfoundland and Labrador) Brad Gushue 🔨	0	1	0	1	0	2	0	3	7
(Alberta) Kevin Koe	0	0	2	0	1	0	0	0	3

Sheet B	1	2	3	4	5	6	7	8	Final
(Italy) Joël Retornaz 🔨	1	0	1	0	0	0	0	0	2
(Ontario) Team Howard	0	1	0	1	0	1	0	3	6

Sheet C	1	2	3	4	5	6	7	8	Final
(Scotland) Ross Whyte	0	0	1	0	2	0	0	X	3
(Alberta) Brendan Bottcher 🔨	0	2	0	1	0	2	0	X	5

Sheet D	1	2	3	4	5	6	7	8	Final
(Manitoba) Mike McEwen 🔨	1	0	0	1	0	0	0	X	2
(Manitoba) Jason Gunnlaugson	0	0	2	0	2	0	0	X	4

==== Draw 17 ====
Saturday, April 16, 8:30 am

Sheet B	1	2	3	4	5	6	7	8	Final
(Saskatchewan) Matt Dunstone	0	2	0	0	2	0	1	0	5
(Alberta) Kevin Koe 🔨	1	0	2	1	0	1	0	2	7

Sheet C	1	2	3	4	5	6	7	8	Final
(Ontario) Team Howard	0	0	1	1	0	0	0	X	2
(Manitoba) Mike McEwen 🔨	1	2	0	0	1	2	2	X	8

Sheet D	1	2	3	4	5	6	7	8	Final
(Ontario) Brad Jacobs 🔨	3	0	0	2	0	1	0	X	6
(Scotland) Ross Whyte	0	0	2	0	0	0	1	X	3

=== Playoffs ===
Quarterfinals
A2	(Scotland) Bruce Mouat	7
C3	(Manitoba) Mike McEwen	5
B2	(Alberta) Brendan Bottcher	8
B3	(Manitoba) Jason Gunnlaugson	3
A1	(Sweden) Niklas Edin	6
C1	(Ontario) Brad Jacobs	4
B1	(Newfoundland and Labrador) Brad Gushue	4
C2	(Alberta) Kevin Koe	2

Semifinals
A2	(Scotland) Bruce Mouat	8
B2	(Alberta) Brendan Bottcher	3
A1	(Sweden) Niklas Edin	6
B1	(Newfoundland and Labrador) Brad Gushue	5

Final
A2	(Scotland) Bruce Mouat	8
A1	(Sweden) Niklas Edin	3

==== Quarterfinals ====
Saturday, April 16, 4:00 pm

Sheet A	1	2	3	4	5	6	7	8	Final
(Alberta) Brendan Bottcher	0	0	0	4	0	4	X	X	8
(Manitoba) Jason Gunnlaugson 🔨	1	0	1	0	1	0	X	X	3

Player percentages
(Alberta) Team Bottcher		(Manitoba) Team Gunnlaugson	
Karrick Martin	75%	Connor Njegovan	85%
Brad Thiessen	85%	Matt Wozniak	75%
Pat Janssen	88%	Adam Casey	83%
Brendan Bottcher	85%	Jason Gunnlaugson	60%
Total	83%	Total	76%

Sheet B	1	2	3	4	5	6	7	8	Final
(Sweden) Niklas Edin 🔨	1	0	2	0	0	2	0	1	6
(Ontario) Brad Jacobs	0	1	0	2	0	0	1	0	4

Player percentages
(Sweden) Team Edin		(Ontario) Team Jacobs	
Rasmus Wranå	91%	Ryan Harnden	83%
—		E. J. Harnden	78%
Oskar Eriksson	89%	Marc Kennedy	91%
Niklas Edin	89%	Brad Jacobs	78%
Total	90%	Total	82%

Sheet C	1	2	3	4	5	6	7	8	Final
(Newfoundland and Labrador) Brad Gushue 🔨	0	1	1	1	0	0	1	X	4
(Alberta) Kevin Koe	0	0	0	0	2	0	0	X	2

Player percentages
(Newfoundland and Labrador) Team Gushue		(Alberta) Team Koe	
Geoff Walker	80%	Ben Hebert	92%
Brett Gallant	88%	John Morris	58%
Mark Nichols	80%	B. J. Neufeld	69%
Brad Gushue	75%	Kevin Koe	57%
Total	81%	Total	69%

Sheet D	1	2	3	4	5	6	7	8	Final
(Scotland) Bruce Mouat 🔨	2	0	3	0	1	1	0	X	7
(Manitoba) Mike McEwen	0	1	0	2	0	0	2	X	5

Player percentages
(Scotland) Team Mouat		(Manitoba) Team McEwen	
Hammy McMillan Jr.	91%	Colin Hodgson	88%
Bobby Lammie	92%	Derek Samagalski	78%
Grant Hardie	95%	Reid Carruthers	64%
Bruce Mouat	83%	Mike McEwen	72%
Total	90%	Total	75%

==== Semifinals ====
Saturday, April 16, 8:00 pm

Sheet A	1	2	3	4	5	6	7	8	Final
(Sweden) Niklas Edin 🔨	0	1	0	1	0	2	0	2	6
(Newfoundland and Labrador) Brad Gushue	0	0	2	0	1	0	2	0	5

Player percentages
(Sweden) Team Edin		(Newfoundland and Labrador) Team Gushue	
Rasmus Wranå	78%	Geoff Walker	86%
—		Brett Gallant	67%
Oskar Eriksson	84%	Mark Nichols	75%
Niklas Edin	81%	Brad Gushue	94%
Total	81%	Total	80%

Sheet C	1	2	3	4	5	6	7	8	Final
(Scotland) Bruce Mouat 🔨	1	0	0	3	0	0	1	3	8
(Alberta) Brendan Bottcher	0	0	1	0	2	0	0	0	3

Player percentages
(Scotland) Team Mouat		(Alberta) Team Bottcher	
Hammy McMillan Jr.	77%	Karrick Martin	88%
Bobby Lammie	80%	Brad Thiessen	78%
Grant Hardie	89%	Pat Janssen	75%
Bruce Mouat	97%	Brendan Bottcher	78%
Total	86%	Total	80%

==== Final ====
Sunday, April 17, 4:00 pm

Sheet B	1	2	3	4	5	6	7	8	Final
(Scotland) Bruce Mouat 🔨	3	2	0	1	2	0	X	X	8
(Sweden) Niklas Edin	0	0	2	0	0	1	X	X	3

Player percentages
(Scotland) Team Mouat		(Sweden) Team Edin	
Hammy McMillan Jr.	85%	Rasmus Wranå	88%
Bobby Lammie	92%	—	
Grant Hardie	88%	Oskar Eriksson	61%
Bruce Mouat	81%	Niklas Edin	63%
Total	86%	Total	71%

== Women ==
=== Teams ===
The teams are listed as follows:

Skip	Third	Second	Lead	Alternate	Locale
Chelsea Carey	Jolene Campbell	Stephanie Schmidt	Jennifer Armstrong	Rachel Erickson	Regina, Saskatchewan
Kerri Einarson	Val Sweeting	Shannon Birchard	Briane Meilleur		Gimli, Manitoba
Tracy Fleury	Selena Njegovan	Liz Fyfe	Kristin MacCuish		East St. Paul, Manitoba
Satsuki Fujisawa	Chinami Yoshida	Yumi Suzuki	Yurika Yoshida		Kitami, Japan
Gim Eun-ji	Kim Min-ji	Kim Su-ji	Seol Ye-eun	Seol Ye-ji	Uijeongbu, South Korea
Anna Hasselborg	Sara McManus	Agnes Knochenhauer	Sofia Mabergs		Sundbyberg, Sweden
Rachel Homan	Emma Miskew	Sarah Wilkes	Joanne Courtney		Ottawa, Ontario
Daniela Jentsch	Emira Abbes	Mia Höhne	Analena Jentsch	Klara-Hermine Fomm	Füssen, Germany
Jennifer Jones	Kaitlyn Lawes	Jocelyn Peterman	Dawn McEwen	Lisa Weagle	Winnipeg, Manitoba
Krista McCarville	Kendra Lilly	Ashley Sippala	Sarah Potts		Thunder Bay, Ontario
Eve Muirhead	Vicky Wright	Jennifer Dodds	Hailey Duff	Mili Smith	Stirling, Scotland
Tabitha Peterson	Nina Roth	Becca Hamilton	Tara Peterson	Aileen Geving	(United States) Saint Paul, Minnesota
Alina Pätz (Fourth)	Silvana Tirinzoni (Skip)	Esther Neuenschwander	Melanie Barbezat		Aarau, Switzerland
Laura Walker	Kate Cameron	Taylor McDonald	Nadine Scotland		Edmonton, Alberta
Isabella Wranå	Almida de Val	Jennie Wåhlin	Maria Larsson		Stockholm, Sweden
Mackenzie Zacharias	Karlee Burgess	Emily Zacharias	Lauren Lenentine		Altona, Manitoba

=== Knockout brackets ===
==== A event ====
A Event	Qualifier 1
1	(Scotland) Eve Muirhead	9
1	(Sweden) Isabella Wranå	5	9	(Scotland) Eve Muirhead	7
2	(Alberta) Laura Walker	8	9	(Alberta) Laura Walker	6
2	(United States) Tabitha Peterson	3	13	(Scotland) Eve Muirhead	3
3	(Switzerland) Silvana Tirinzoni	7	13	(Switzerland) Silvana Tirinzoni	6
3	(Germany) Daniela Jentsch	2	10	(Switzerland) Silvana Tirinzoni	7
4	(Japan) Satsuki Fujisawa	7	10	(Japan) Satsuki Fujisawa	1
4	(Manitoba) Mackenzie Zacharias	1

A Event	Qualifier 2
5	(Manitoba) Tracy Fleury	7
5	(South Korea) Gim Eun-ji	5	11	(Manitoba) Tracy Fleury	7
6	(Manitoba) Jennifer Jones	6	11	(Manitoba) Jennifer Jones	6
6	(Saskatchewan) Chelsea Carey	4	14	(Manitoba) Tracy Fleury	7
7	(Sweden) Anna Hasselborg	4	14	(Manitoba) Kerri Einarson	4
7	(Ontario) Krista McCarville	9	12	(Ontario) Krista McCarville	2
8	(Manitoba) Kerri Einarson	6	12	(Manitoba) Kerri Einarson	4
8	(Ontario) Rachel Homan	2

==== B event ====
B Event						Qualifier 3
15	(Sweden) Isabella Wranå	6
15	(United States) Tabitha Peterson	3	19	(Sweden) Isabella Wranå	5
16	(Germany) Daniela Jentsch	9	19	(Germany) Daniela Jentsch	9
16	(Manitoba) Mackenzie Zacharias	1				23	(Germany) Daniela Jentsch	2
						23	(Manitoba) Kerri Einarson	10

B Event						Qualifier 4
17	(South Korea) Gim Eun-ji	2
17	(Saskatchewan) Chelsea Carey	8	20	(Saskatchewan) Chelsea Carey	3
18	(Sweden) Anna Hasselborg	3	20	(Ontario) Rachel Homan	7
18	(Ontario) Rachel Homan	6				24	(Ontario) Rachel Homan	2
						24	(Scotland) Eve Muirhead	9

B Event			Qualifier 5
21	(Alberta) Laura Walker	5
21	(Japan) Satsuki Fujisawa	8	25	(Japan) Satsuki Fujisawa	9
22	(Manitoba) Jennifer Jones	2	25	(Ontario) Krista McCarville	2
22	(Ontario) Krista McCarville	8

==== C event ====
C Event						Qualifier 6
26	(United States) Tabitha Peterson	1
26	(Manitoba) Mackenzie Zacharias	6	28	(Manitoba) Mackenzie Zacharias	6
			28	(Alberta) Laura Walker	4
						31	(Manitoba) Mackenzie Zacharias	6
						31	(Ontario) Rachel Homan	8

C Event						Qualifier 7
27	(South Korea) Gim Eun-ji	2
27	(Sweden) Anna Hasselborg	7	29	(Sweden) Anna Hasselborg	7
			29	(Manitoba) Jennifer Jones	3
						32	(Sweden) Anna Hasselborg	5
						32	(Germany) Daniela Jentsch	4

C Event			Qualifier 8
30	(Sweden) Isabella Wranå	9
30	(Saskatchewan) Chelsea Carey	5	33	(Sweden) Isabella Wranå	7
			33	(Ontario) Krista McCarville	2

=== Knockout results ===
All draw times are listed in Eastern Time (UTC−04:00).

==== Draw 1 ====
Tuesday, April 12, 8:00 am

Sheet A	1	2	3	4	5	6	7	8	Final
(Scotland) Eve Muirhead 🔨	2	0	1	0	4	0	2	X	9
(Sweden) Isabella Wranå	0	1	0	1	0	3	0	X	5

Sheet B	1	2	3	4	5	6	7	8	Final
(Alberta) Laura Walker	0	3	1	1	0	1	2	X	8
(United States) Tabitha Peterson 🔨	2	0	0	0	1	0	0	X	3

Sheet C	1	2	3	4	5	6	7	8	Final
(Manitoba) Tracy Fleury 🔨	2	0	1	3	0	1	0	X	7
(South Korea) Gim Eun-ji	0	2	0	0	1	0	2	X	5

Sheet D	1	2	3	4	5	6	7	8	Final
(Manitoba) Jennifer Jones 🔨	0	3	0	1	1	0	0	1	6
(Saskatchewan) Chelsea Carey	1	0	1	0	0	1	1	0	4

==== Draw 2 ====
Tuesday, April 12, 11:30 am

Sheet A	1	2	3	4	5	6	7	8	Final
(Switzerland) Silvana Tirinzoni 🔨	3	1	0	1	2	0	X	X	7
(Germany) Daniela Jentsch	0	0	1	0	0	1	X	X	2

Sheet B	1	2	3	4	5	6	7	8	Final
(Japan) Satsuki Fujisawa	1	0	3	1	2	X	X	X	7
(Manitoba) Mackenzie Zacharias 🔨	0	1	0	0	0	X	X	X	1

Sheet C	1	2	3	4	5	6	7	8	Final
(Sweden) Anna Hasselborg	1	0	2	0	1	0	0	0	4
(Ontario) Krista McCarville 🔨	0	2	0	2	0	1	1	3	9

Sheet D	1	2	3	4	5	6	7	8	Final
(Manitoba) Kerri Einarson 🔨	2	0	2	0	0	1	1	X	6
(Ontario) Rachel Homan	0	1	0	1	0	0	0	X	2

==== Draw 5 ====
Wednesday, April 13, 8:30 am

Sheet A	1	2	3	4	5	6	7	8	Final
(Sweden) Anna Hasselborg 🔨	0	2	0	1	0	0	0	0	3
(Ontario) Rachel Homan	0	0	1	0	1	2	0	2	6

Sheet B	1	2	3	4	5	6	7	8	Final
(Ontario) Krista McCarville	0	1	0	0	0	1	0	0	2
(Manitoba) Kerri Einarson 🔨	1	0	0	1	0	0	0	2	4

Sheet C	1	2	3	4	5	6	7	8	Final
(Germany) Daniela Jentsch 🔨	0	0	2	3	4	X	X	X	9
(Manitoba) Mackenzie Zacharias	0	1	0	0	0	X	X	X	1

Sheet D	1	2	3	4	5	6	7	8	Final
(Switzerland) Silvana Tirinzoni	0	2	2	2	1	X	X	X	7
(Japan) Satsuki Fujisawa 🔨	1	0	0	0	0	X	X	X	1

==== Draw 6 ====
Wednesday, April 13, 12:00 pm

Sheet A	1	2	3	4	5	6	7	8	Final
(South Korea) Gim Eun-ji	1	0	0	0	1	0	X	X	2
(Saskatchewan) Chelsea Carey 🔨	0	1	1	2	0	4	X	X	8

Sheet B	1	2	3	4	5	6	7	8	9	Final
(Manitoba) Tracy Fleury 🔨	2	1	1	0	0	0	2	0	1	7
(Manitoba) Jennifer Jones	0	0	0	1	0	3	0	2	0	6

Sheet C	1	2	3	4	5	6	7	8	Final
(Sweden) Isabella Wranå 🔨	1	0	2	0	0	3	0	X	6
(United States) Tabitha Peterson	0	1	0	1	0	0	1	X	3

Sheet D	1	2	3	4	5	6	7	8	Final
(Scotland) Eve Muirhead	2	0	2	0	0	0	2	1	7
(Alberta) Laura Walker 🔨	0	1	0	2	1	2	0	0	6

==== Draw 9 ====
Thursday, April 14, 8:30 am

Sheet B	1	2	3	4	5	6	7	8	Final
(Saskatchewan) Chelsea Carey 🔨	1	0	1	0	1	0	0	X	3
(Ontario) Rachel Homan	0	2	0	2	0	1	2	X	7

Sheet D	1	2	3	4	5	6	7	8	Final
(Sweden) Isabella Wranå	0	2	1	0	1	1	0	0	5
(Germany) Daniela Jentsch 🔨	4	0	0	1	0	0	2	2	9

==== Draw 10 ====
Thursday, April 14, 12:00 pm

Sheet B	1	2	3	4	5	6	7	8	Final
(Manitoba) Jennifer Jones	0	0	0	2	0	0	X	X	2
(Ontario) Krista McCarville 🔨	1	1	1	0	3	2	X	X	8

Sheet D	1	2	3	4	5	6	7	8	Final
(Alberta) Laura Walker	0	0	1	0	3	0	1	0	5
(Japan) Satsuki Fujisawa 🔨	1	1	0	3	0	1	0	2	8

==== Draw 11 ====
Thursday, April 14, 4:00 pm

Sheet B	1	2	3	4	5	6	7	8	Final
(South Korea) Gim Eun-ji 🔨	0	1	0	0	1	0	0	X	2
(Sweden) Anna Hasselborg	1	0	2	2	0	1	1	X	7

Sheet D	1	2	3	4	5	6	7	8	Final
(United States) Tabitha Peterson	0	1	0	0	0	0	0	X	1
(Manitoba) Mackenzie Zacharias 🔨	1	0	1	1	1	1	1	X	6

==== Draw 12 ====
Thursday, April 14, 8:00 pm

Sheet A	1	2	3	4	5	6	7	8	Final
(Manitoba) Tracy Fleury 🔨	1	0	1	0	1	2	0	2	7
(Manitoba) Kerri Einarson	0	2	0	1	0	0	1	0	4

Sheet C	1	2	3	4	5	6	7	8	Final
(Scotland) Eve Muirhead	0	1	0	1	0	1	0	X	3
(Switzerland) Silvana Tirinzoni 🔨	2	0	2	0	1	0	1	X	6

==== Draw 13 ====
Friday, April 15, 8:30 am

Sheet A	1	2	3	4	5	6	7	8	Final
(Manitoba) Mackenzie Zacharias	0	0	0	3	0	2	1	X	6
(Alberta) Laura Walker 🔨	0	2	0	0	2	0	0	X	4

Sheet D	1	2	3	4	5	6	7	8	Final
(Sweden) Anna Hasselborg	0	0	2	1	0	0	4	X	7
(Manitoba) Jennifer Jones 🔨	1	0	0	0	1	1	0	X	3

==== Draw 14 ====
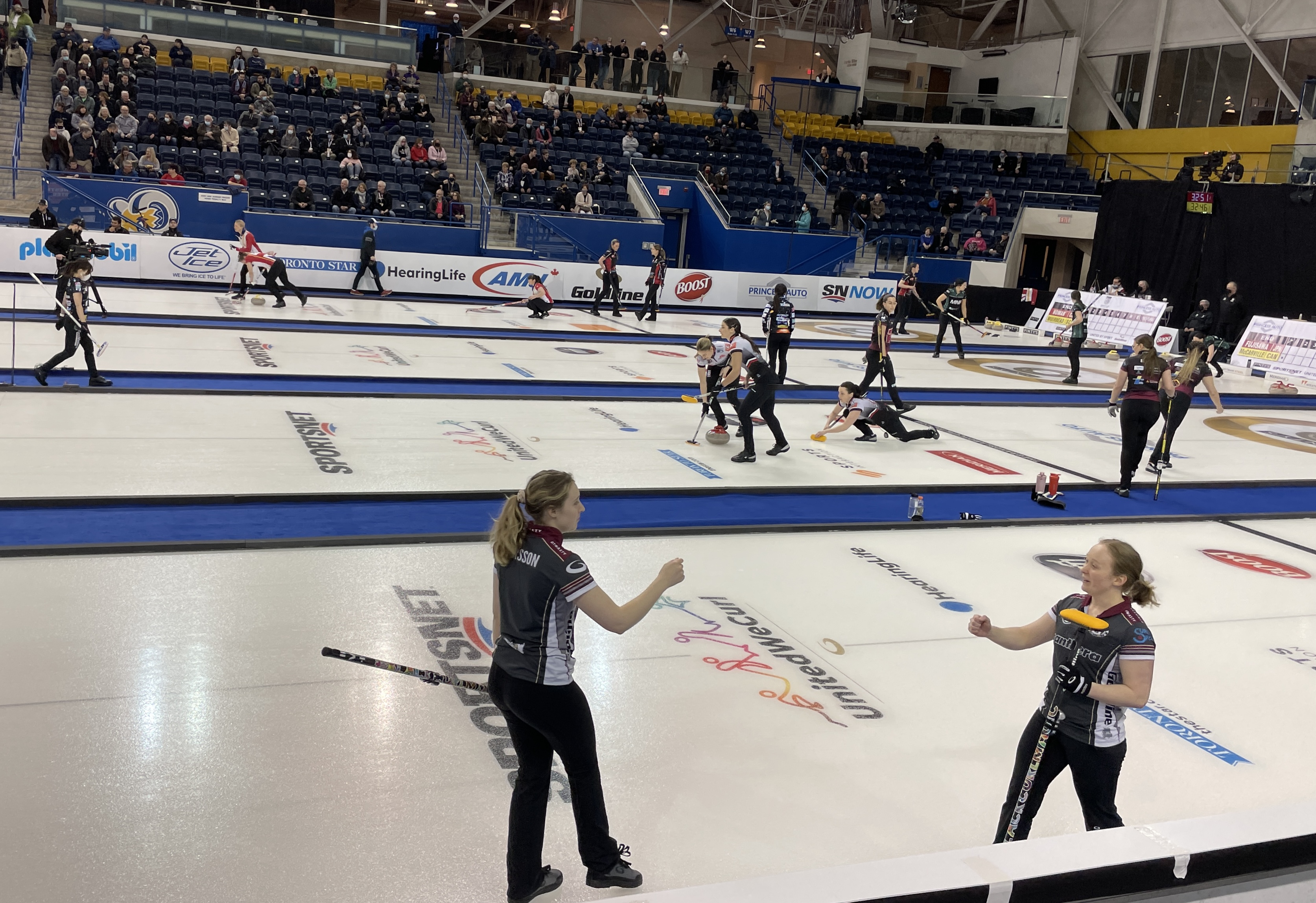
Draw 14 action

Friday, April 15, 12:00 pm

Sheet A	1	2	3	4	5	6	7	8	Final
(Sweden) Isabella Wranå 🔨	2	0	4	1	0	0	2	X	9
(Saskatchewan) Chelsea Carey	0	3	0	0	1	1	0	X	5

Sheet B	1	2	3	4	5	6	7	8	Final
(Germany) Daniela Jentsch 🔨	0	1	0	1	0	0	0	X	2
(Manitoba) Kerri Einarson	1	0	2	0	2	1	4	X	10

Sheet C	1	2	3	4	5	6	7	8	Final
(Japan) Satsuki Fujisawa	0	0	3	0	4	2	X	X	9
(Ontario) Krista McCarville 🔨	0	1	0	1	0	0	X	X	2

Sheet D	1	2	3	4	5	6	7	8	Final
(Ontario) Rachel Homan 🔨	0	0	2	0	0	0	X	X	2
(Scotland) Eve Muirhead	0	2	0	2	3	2	X	X	9

==== Draw 16 ====
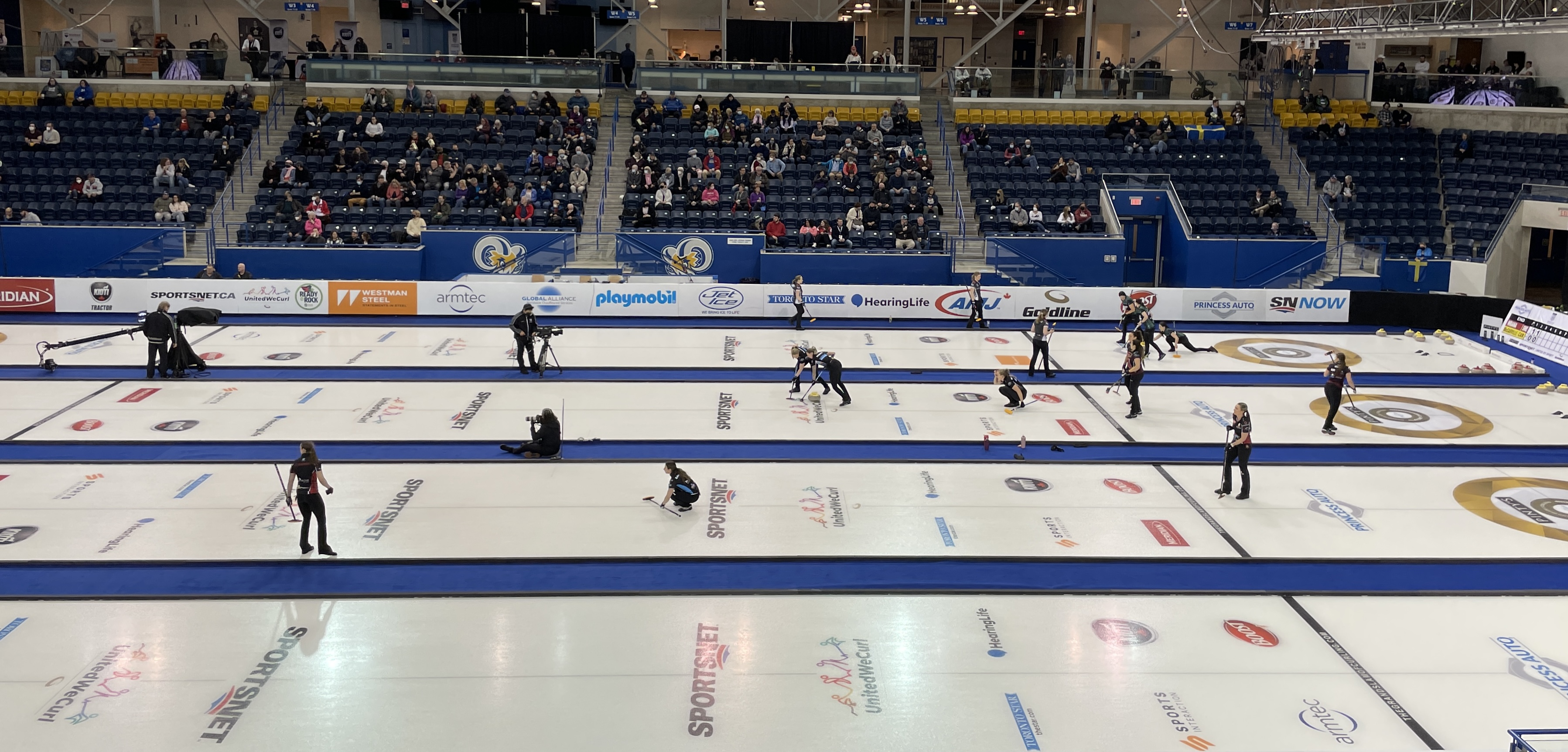
Draw 16 action

Friday, April 15, 8:00 pm

Sheet B	1	2	3	4	5	6	7	8	Final
(Manitoba) Mackenzie Zacharias	0	3	0	0	3	0	0	0	6
(Ontario) Rachel Homan 🔨	1	0	3	1	0	2	0	1	8

Sheet C	1	2	3	4	5	6	7	8	Final
(Sweden) Anna Hasselborg	0	1	0	0	2	1	1	0	5
(Germany) Daniela Jentsch 🔨	1	0	1	1	0	0	0	1	4

Sheet D	1	2	3	4	5	6	7	8	Final
(Sweden) Isabella Wranå	1	1	0	2	1	1	1	X	7
(Ontario) Krista McCarville 🔨	0	0	2	0	0	0	0	X	2

=== Playoffs ===
Quarterfinals
A2	(Manitoba) Tracy Fleury	5
C3	(Sweden) Isabella Wranå	3
B3	(Japan) Satsuki Fujisawa	3
B1	(Manitoba) Kerri Einarson	7
A1	(Switzerland) Silvana Tirinzoni	6
C1	(Ontario) Rachel Homan	7
B2	(Scotland) Eve Muirhead	5
C2	(Sweden) Anna Hasselborg	7

Semifinals
A2	(Manitoba) Tracy Fleury	4
B1	(Manitoba) Kerri Einarson	8
C1	(Ontario) Rachel Homan	7
C2	(Sweden) Anna Hasselborg	8

Final
B1	(Manitoba) Kerri Einarson	5
C2	(Sweden) Anna Hasselborg	6

==== Quarterfinals ====
Saturday, April 16, 12:00 pm

Sheet A	1	2	3	4	5	6	7	8	Final
(Japan) Satsuki Fujisawa	0	1	0	0	2	0	0	X	3
(Manitoba) Kerri Einarson 🔨	1	0	1	1	0	2	2	X	7

Player percentages
(Japan) Team Fujisawa		(Manitoba) Team Einarson	
Yurika Yoshida	84%	Briane Meilleur	84%
Yumi Suzuki	64%	Shannon Birchard	79%
Chinami Yoshida	54%	Val Sweeting	84%
Satsuki Fujisawa	57%	Kerri Einarson	80%
Total	65%	Total	82%

Sheet B	1	2	3	4	5	6	7	8	Final
(Manitoba) Tracy Fleury 🔨	0	1	0	2	1	1	0	X	5
(Sweden) Isabella Wranå	0	0	1	0	0	0	2	X	3

Player percentages
(Manitoba) Team Fleury		(Sweden) Team Wranå	
Kristin MacCuish	88%	Maria Larsson	98%
Liz Fyfe	88%	Jennie Wåhlin	83%
Selena Njegovan	97%	Almida de Val	81%
Tracy Fleury	92%	Isabella Wranå	95%
Total	91%	Total	89%

Sheet C	1	2	3	4	5	6	7	8	Final
(Switzerland) Silvana Tirinzoni 🔨	0	1	0	0	2	0	3	0	6
(Ontario) Rachel Homan	0	0	1	0	0	4	0	2	7

Player percentages
(Switzerland) Team Tirinzoni		(Ontario) Team Homan	
Melanie Barbezat	78%	Joanne Courtney	80%
Esther Neuenschwander	66%	Sarah Wilkes	83%
Silvana Tirinzoni	81%	Emma Miskew	81%
Alina Pätz	72%	Rachel Homan	87%
Total	74%	Total	83%

Sheet D	1	2	3	4	5	6	7	8	Final
(Scotland) Eve Muirhead 🔨	3	1	0	0	1	0	0	0	5
(Sweden) Anna Hasselborg	0	0	3	1	0	1	1	1	7

Player percentages
(Scotland) Team Muirhead		(Sweden) Team Hasselborg	
Hailey Duff	89%	Sofia Mabergs	91%
Jennifer Dodds	81%	Agnes Knochenhauer	69%
Vicky Wright	80%	Sara McManus	78%
Eve Muirhead	72%	Anna Hasselborg	81%
Total	80%	Total	80%

==== Semifinals ====
Saturday, April 16, 8:00 pm

Sheet B	1	2	3	4	5	6	7	8	9	Final
(Ontario) Rachel Homan 🔨	0	2	0	1	0	4	0	0	0	7
(Sweden) Anna Hasselborg	0	0	2	0	2	0	1	2	1	8

Player percentages
(Ontario) Team Homan		(Sweden) Team Hasselborg	
Joanne Courtney	93%	Sofia Mabergs	90%
Sarah Wilkes	82%	Agnes Knochenhauer	88%
Emma Miskew	85%	Sara McManus	79%
Rachel Homan	64%	Anna Hasselborg	79%
Total	81%	Total	84%

Sheet D	1	2	3	4	5	6	7	8	Final
(Manitoba) Tracy Fleury 🔨	1	1	0	1	0	1	0	X	4
(Manitoba) Kerri Einarson	0	0	3	0	2	0	3	X	8

Player percentages
(Manitoba) Team Fleury		(Manitoba) Team Einarson	
Kristin MacCuish	80%	Briane Meilleur	89%
Liz Fyfe	70%	Shannon Birchard	83%
Selena Njegovan	67%	Val Sweeting	86%
Tracy Fleury	61%	Kerri Einarson	80%
Total	70%	Total	85%

==== Final ====
Sunday, April 17, 12:00 pm

Sheet C	1	2	3	4	5	6	7	8	Final
(Manitoba) Kerri Einarson 🔨	3	0	1	0	0	1	0	0	5
(Sweden) Anna Hasselborg	0	1	0	2	1	0	0	2	6

Player percentages
(Manitoba) Team Einarson		(Sweden) Team Hasselborg	
Briane Meilleur	84%	Sofia Mabergs	91%
Shannon Birchard	81%	Agnes Knochenhauer	80%
Val Sweeting	73%	Sara McManus	81%
Kerri Einarson	56%	Anna Hasselborg	82%
Total	74%	Total	83%
