= 2015 SaskTel Tankard =

- Host city: Melville, Saskatchewan
- Arena: Horizon Credit Union Centre
- Dates: February 4–8
- Winner: Steve Laycock
- Curling club: Nutana CC, Saskatoon
- Skip: Steve Laycock
- Third: Kirk Muyres
- Second: Colton Flasch
- Lead: Dallan Muyres
- Finalist: Jason Jacobson

The 2015 SaskTel Tankard, the provincial men's curling championship for Saskatchewan, was held from February 4 to 8 at the Horizon Credit Union Centre in Melville. The winning Steve Laycock team represented Saskatchewan at the 2015 Tim Hortons Brier in Calgary.

== Teams ==
The teams are listed as follows:

Skip	Third	Second	Lead	Locale(s)
Jason Ackerman	Brent Goeres	Chris Horwath	Mike Armstrong	Highland Curling Club, Regina
Scott Bitz	Jeff Sharp	Aryn Scmhidt	Dean Hicke	Highland Curling Club, Regina
Randy Bryden	Troy Robinson	Kelly Knapp	Trent Knapp	Callie Curling Club, Regina
Michael Carss	Mark Bahrey	Loren Trofimenkoff	Tyler Matheson	Sutherland Curling Club, Saskatoon
Dale Craig	Brady Scharback	Dustin Philips	Cory Fleming	Nutana Curling Club, Saskatoon
Brent Gedak	Catlin Schneider	Derek Owens	Shawn Meyer	Estevan Curling Club, Estevan
Erwin Hanley	Andrew Edgar	Dean Cursons	Cory Hubick	Highland Curling Club, Regina
Kody Hartung (fourth)	Jeff Hartung (skip)	Tyler Hartung	Claire DeCock	Langenburg Curling Club, Langenburg
Shaun Meachem (fourth)	Drew Heidt (skip)	Mitch Heidt	Jeff Chambers	Unity Curling Club, Unity
Josh Heidt	Brock Montgomery	Matt Lang	Jayden Shwaga	Kerrobert Curling Club, Kerrobert
Jacon Jacobson	Dustin Kalthoff	Tony Korol	Rory Golanowski	Nutana Curling Club, Saskatoon
Joel Jordison	Chris Busby	Dane Roy	Matt Froehlich	Moose Jaw Ford Curling Centre, Moose Jaw
Steve Laycock	Kirk Muyres	Colton Flasch	Dallan Muyres	Nutana Curling Club, Saskatoon
Kevin Marsh	Matt Ryback	Dan Marsh	Aaron Shutra	Nutana Curling Club, Saskatoon
Terry Marteniuk	Trevor Mackan	Ray Sharp	Aron Hershmiller	Yorkton Curling Club, Yorkton
Rick Schneider	Jamie Schneider	Curt England	Shannon England	Highland Curling Club, Regina

== Knockout Draw Brackets ==
=== A Event ===
First Knockout
Laycock	6
Hanley	4
Gedak	7
Ackerman	9
Jordison	7
Bitz	6
Marteniuk	4
Jacobson	6
Bryden	6
Craig	7
J. Heidt	3
Schneider	10
Hartung	6
D. Heidt	5
Carss	3
Marsh	7

Quarterfinals
Layock	3
Ackerman	2
Jordison	2
Jacobson	3
Craig	5
Schneider	6
Hartung	10
Marsh	5

Semifinals
Laycock	6
Jacobson	5
Schneider	4
Hartung	7

Qualifier 1
Laycock	2
Hartung	4

=== B Event ===
Second Knockout
Hanley	5
Gedak	8
Bryden	10
J. Heidt	5

Quarterfinals
Jordison	3
Gedak	7
Marsh	7
Bryden	9

Semifinals
Gedak	9
Schneider	7
Bryden	1
Jacobson	8

To Qualifier 2
Gedak	4
Jacobson	8
Qualifier 2
Jacobson	4
Laycock	7

Second Knockout
Bitz	8
Marteniuk	3
D. Heidt	10
Carss	4

Quarterfinals
Ackerman	7
Bitz	8
Craig	4
D. Heidt	7

Semifinals
Bitz	2
D. Heidt	8

To Qualifier 2
D. Heidt	5
Laycock	6

=== C Event ===
Third Knockout
Hanley	6
Marteniuk	3
Jordison	6
Marsh	7

Quarterfinals
Hanley	5
Bryden	6
Bitz	7
Marsh	4

Semifinals
D. Heidt	6
Bryden	8
Bitz	7
Gedak	4

Qualifier 3
Bryden	6
Bitz	3

Third Knockout
J. Heidt	10
Carss	2

Quarterfinals
Schneider	7
J. Heidt	6
Ackerman	6
Craig	7

Semifinals
Schneider	7
Craig	2

Qualifier 4
Schneider	6
Jacobson	7

== Playoffs ==
Page playoff system
1	Jeff Hartung	4
2	Steve Laycock	7
3	Randy Bryden	6
4	Jason Jacobson	8

Semifinal
1	Jeff Hartung	3
4	Jason Jacobson	8

Final
2	Steve Laycock	8
4	Jason Jacobson	7

=== 1 vs. 2 ===
Saturday, February 7, 7:00 pm

Team	1	2	3	4	5	6	7	8	9	10	Final
Jeff Hartung	1	0	0	0	1	0	0	0	2	0	4
Steve Laycock	0	0	2	2	0	1	0	1	0	1	7

=== 3 vs. 4 ===
Saturday, February 7, 7:00 pm

Team	1	2	3	4	5	6	7	8	9	10	Final
Randy Bryden	1	0	0	0	1	0	3	0	1	0	6
Jason Jacobson	0	1	1	1	0	2	0	2	0	1	8

=== Semifinal ===
Sunday, February 8, 9:30 am

Team	1	2	3	4	5	6	7	8	9	10	Final
Jeff Hartung	1	0	0	1	0	0	1	0	X	X	3
Jason Jacobson	0	0	3	0	1	3	0	1	X	X	8

=== Final ===
Sunday, February 8, 2:00 pm

Team	1	2	3	4	5	6	7	8	9	10	Final
Steve Laycock	1	0	0	0	2	0	3	0	0	2	8
Jason Jacobson	0	0	2	1	0	2	0	1	1	0	7

2015 SaskTel Tankard

Steve Laycock
5th Saskatchewan Provincial Championship title
