= 2019 SaskTel Tankard =

Curling competition taking place in Saskatchewan, Canada

- Host city: Whitewood, Saskatchewan
- Arena: Whitewood Community Centre
- Dates: February 6–10
- Winner: Team Muyres
- Curling club: Nutana Curling Club
- Skip: Kirk Muyres
- Third: Kevin Marsh
- Second: Dan Marsh
- Lead: Dallan Muyres
- Finalist: Matt Dunstone

The 2019 SaskTel Tankard, the provincial men's curling championship for Saskatchewan, was held from February 6 to 10 at the Whitewood Community Centre in Whitewood, Saskatchewan The winning Kirk Muyres team represented Saskatchewan at the 2019 Tim Hortons Brier in Brandon, Manitoba, Canada's national men's curling championship.

Whitewood is the smallest community to ever host the Tankard.

== Teams ==
The teams are listed as follows:

Skip	Third	Second	Lead	Locale(s)
Mike Armstrong	Garret Springer	Grady Lamontagne	Jake Ripplinger	Highland Curling Club, Regina
Scott Comfort	Brennen Jones	Byron Moffatt	Lee Johnson	Wadena Curling Club, Wadena
Ryan Deis	Scott Manners	Jason Barnhart	Kalin Deis	Fox Valley Curling Club, Fox Valley
Matt Dunstone	Braeden Moskowy	Catlin Schneider	Dustin Kidby	Highland Curling Club, Regina
Lloyd Fell	Brennan Schiele	Cole Tenetuik	Chadd McKenzie	Twin Rivers Curling Club, North Battleford
Brent Gedak	Jason Ackerman	Derek Owens	Curtis Horwath	Estevan Power Dodge Curling Centre, Estevan
Jeff Hartung	Jason Krupski	Jeremy Chevrier	Chad Petracek	Langenburg Curling Club, Langenburg
Kody Hartung	Tyler Hartung	Jayden Shwaga	Mark Larsen	Nutana Curling Club, Saskatoon
Joshua Heidt	Brock Montgomery	Kelly Knapp	Trent Knapp	Kerrobert Curling Club, Kerrobert
Steven Howard	Ben Gamble	Braydan Mohns	Scott Deck	Highland Curling Club, Regina
Jason Jacobson	Jacob Hersikorn	Quinn Hersikorn	Nick Neufeld	Nutana Curling Club, Saskatoon
Dustin Kalthoff	Shaun Meachem	Brayden Stewart	Jared Latos	Nutana Curling Club, Saskatoon
Brady Kendel	Anthony Neufeld	Mat Ring	Brandon Leippi	Kronau Curling Club, Kronau
Rylan Kleiter	Trevor Johnson	Joshua Mattern	Matthieu Taillon	Sutherland Curling Club, Saskatoon
Kirk Muyres	Kevin Marsh	Dan Marsh	Dallan Muyres	Nutana Curling Club, Saskatoon
Brock Virtue	Drew Heidt	Mitch Heidt	Jesse St. John	Kerrobert Curling Club, Kerrobert

== Knockout Draw Brackets ==
=== A Event ===
First Knockout
Dunstone	8
Fell	6
Deis	9
Jacobson	10
Comfort	12
Gedak	4
Kleiter	6
Heidt	8
Muyres	9
J. Hartung	2
Virtue	6
Armstrong	3
Kalthoff	10
Kendel	3
Howard	2
K. Hartung	4

Quarterfinals
Dunstone	4
Jacobson	5
Comfort	9
Heidt	11
Muyres	4
Virtue	3
Kalthoff	4
K. Hartung	3

Semifinals
Jacobson	4
Heidt	8
Muyres	5
Kalthoff	4

Qualifier 1
Heidt	6
Muyres	8

=== B Event ===
Second Knockout
Fell	6
Deis	4
J. Hartung	7
Armstrong	6
Gedak	3
Kleiter	10
Kendel	7
Howard	4

Round of 16
Comfort	5
Fell	8
K. Hartung	7
J.Hartung	6
Dunstone	10
Kleiter	2
Virtue	5
Kendel	6

Quarterfinals
Fell	4
Kalthoff	8
K. Hartung	8
Jacobson	5
Dunstone	5
Kendel	2

Semifinals
Kalthoff	5
K. Hartung	9
Dunstone	5
Heidt	2

Qualifier 2
K. Hartung	4
Dunstone	8

=== C Event ===
Third Knockout
Deis	8
Gedak	4
Comfort	6
J. Hartung	7

Quarterfinals
Deis	5
Jacobson	4
J.Hartung	6
Kendel	7

Semifinals
Heidt	4
Deis	6
Kendel	4
Kalthoff	7

Qualifier 3
Deis	9
Kalthoff	6

Third Knockout
Armstrong	6
Howard	7

Quarterfinals
Howard	5
Fell	8
Kleiter	9
Virtue	5

Semifinals
Fell	5
Kleiter	8

Qualifier 4
Kleiter	5
K. Hartung	7

== Playoffs ==
Page playoff system
A	Kirk Muyres	4
B	Matt Dunstone	7
C1	Ryan Deis	8
C2	Kody Hartung	6

Semifinal
A	Kirk Muyres	7
C1	Ryan Deis	6

Final
B	Matt Dunstone	5
A	Kirk Muyres	6

=== A vs. B ===
February 9, 7:00pm

Sheet 2	1	2	3	4	5	6	7	8	9	10	Final
Kirk Muyres	2	0	0	0	0	1	0	1	0	X	4
Matt Dunstone	0	2	0	0	1	0	2	0	2	X	7

=== C1 vs. C2 ===
February 9, 7:00pm

Sheet 3	1	2	3	4	5	6	7	8	9	10	Final
Ryan Deis	0	1	0	1	1	0	2	0	2	1	8
Kody Hartung	0	0	3	0	0	2	0	1	0	0	6

=== Semifinal ===
February 10, 9:30am

Sheet 2	1	2	3	4	5	6	7	8	9	10	Final
Kirk Muyres	1	0	1	0	1	1	0	2	0	1	7
Ryan Deis	0	1	0	2	0	0	1	0	2	0	6

=== Final ===
February 10, 2:30pm

Sheet 2	1	2	3	4	5	6	7	8	9	10	Final
Matt Dunstone	1	0	2	0	1	0	0	1	0	0	5
Kirk Muyres	0	2	0	1	0	2	0	0	0	1	6

2019 SaskTel Tankard

Kirk Muyres
5th Saskatchewan Provincial Championship title
