= Dan Marsh (curler) =

Canadian curler (born 1988)

- Curler
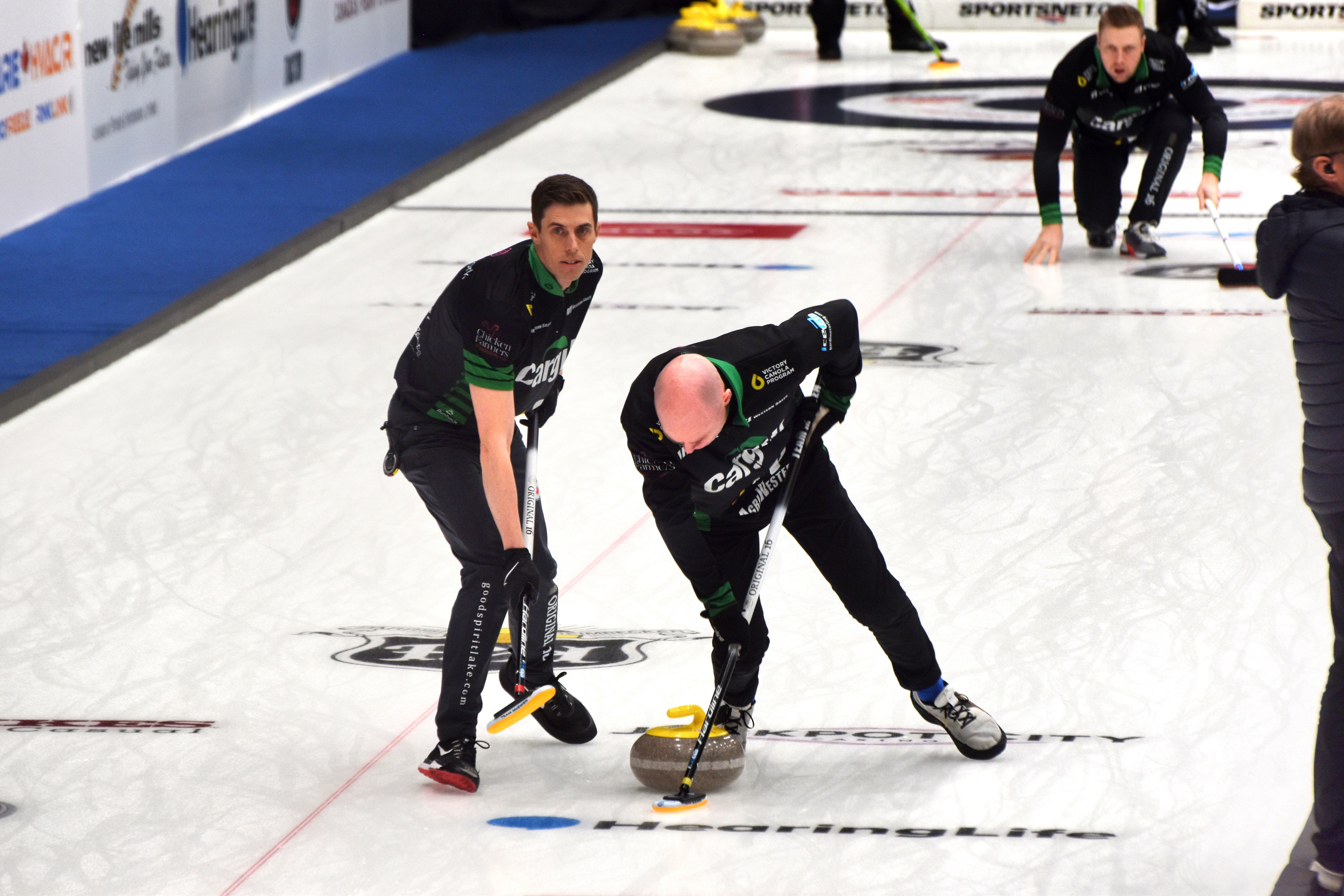
- Marsh (left) at the 2026 Players' Championship
- Born: November 18, 1988 (age 37); Regina, Saskatchewan

Team
- Curling club: Nutana CC, Saskatoon, SK
- Skip: Tyler Tardi
- Third: Colton Flasch
- Second: Kevin Marsh
- Lead: Dan Marsh

Curling career
- Member Association: Saskatchewan
- Brier: 5 (2019, 2022, 2024, 2025, 2026)
- Top CTRS ranking: 3rd (2023–24, 2024–25)
Medal record
Representing Saskatchewan
Canadian Olympic Curling Trials
Bronze medal – third place	2025 Halifax
The Brier
Silver medal – second place	2024 Regina

Daniel Marsh (born November 18, 1988, in Regina) is a Canadian curler from Saskatoon, Saskatchewan. He currently plays lead on Team Tyler Tardi.

== Career ==
During the 2010–11 season, Marsh had two playoff appearances on the Saskatchewan Curling Tour. His team, skipped by brother Kevin Marsh finished runner-up at the KMC Rocktoberfest and lost in the semifinals at the 2010 Horizon Laser Vision Center Classic. The following season, his team of Kevin Marsh, Matt Ryback and Aaron Shutra won the Moose Jaw Cash Spiel. The team also made it to the final of the Best Western Curling Classic and the semifinals of the SCPA Championship.

Team Marsh continued to have success into the 2012–13 season. They reached the final at the Best Western Curling Classic once again and made the final of the DirectWest Rocktoberfest. In February, Team Marsh competed in their first provincial championship at the 2013 SaskTel Tankard. There, they qualified for the playoffs through the C Event, and then defeated Steve Laycock 8–5 in the 3 vs. 4 page playoff game. Their run would end in the semifinal with an 8–6 loss to the eventual champions Brock Virtue. The next season, the team won the Humboldt Cash Spiel, and reached the playoffs in four of their other five events. For a second year in a row, they qualified for the playoffs at the 2014 SaskTel Tankard through the C event. They wouldn't make it to the semifinal round this year, however, losing 9–8 to Jeff Hartung in the 3 vs. 4 game.

After failing to win any events in the first half of the 2014–15 season, Team Marsh began the second half by winning the Saskatchewan Players' Championship. Despite this, they could not continue their momentum in the 2015 SaskTel Tankard and they missed the playoffs. Following the season, Team Marsh disbanded, with Dan and his brother Kevin joining the Bruce Korte rink at third and second respectively. The team also included Matt Lang. On the tour, the team picked up victories at the Heritage Inn SCT Spiel and the Saskatchewan Players' Championship once again. At the 2016 SaskTel Tankard, they lost in the C event semifinal and did not advance to the playoffs.

In their fourth event of the 2016–17 season, Team Korte won the Saskatoon Nutana SCT Classic. They also made the final of the Estevan Curling Classic and reached the semifinals of the Ed Werenich Golden Wrench Classic and the Humboldt Cash Spiel. In the new year, Team Korte was invited to compete in the 2017 Meridian Canadian Open Grand Slam of Curling event, which was Marsh' first time competing in a Slam. There, the team finished 2–3 in the triple knockout stage, not enough to advance to the playoff round. At the 2017 SaskTel Tankard, the team reached the playoffs through the C event. After defeating Kody Hartung 4–3 in the 3 vs. 4 game, they dropped the semifinal 7–6 to Steve Laycock in an extra end.

The following season, both Bruce Korte and Matt Lang left the team. They were replaced by Colton Flasch, the former second on Team Laycock and Trent Knapp respectively. The new team would win one tour event, the College Clean Restoration Curling Classic and would lose in the semifinal of the Red Deer Curling Classic. Their combined points earned them a spot in the 2017 Canadian Olympic Curling Pre-Trials where they finished 2–4, missing the playoffs. At the 2018 SaskTel Tankard, the team had a strong run, qualifying for the playoffs through the A event and winning the 1 vs. 2 page playoff game 7–1 over Brock Virtue. This qualified them directly for the final where they faced Team Laycock. After giving up five in the fifth end, the team could not recover, losing the provincial final 9–7. They wrapped up their season at the 2018 Humpty's Champions Cup, which they qualified for by winning the College Clean Restoration Curling Classic. There, they lost in a tiebreaker to Mike McEwen.

After just one season, Team Flasch broke up. The Marsh brothers then joined brothers Kirk and Dallan Muyres for the 2018–19 season. The team, led by Kirk Muyres, found success early by reaching the final of both the DeKalb Superspiel and the Medicine Hat Charity Classic. The team was invited to compete in the 2018 Tour Challenge Tier 2 event, where they went a perfect 7–0 to claim the title. This earned them promotion into the Tier 1 slams which they competed in three of, the 2018 National, the 2019 Canadian Open and the 2019 Champions Cup, missing the playoffs at all of them. In the new year, they reached the final of the Ed Werenich Golden Wrench Classic where they were defeated by Team McEwen. At the 2019 SaskTel Tankard, Team Muyres qualified through the A event with an undefeated record. They then lost the 1 vs. 2 game 7–4 to favorites Matt Dunstone but were able to bounce back 7–6 in the semifinal over Ryan Deis to reach the final. There, Team Muyres scored one in the tenth end to defeat Dunstone 6–5 and qualify for the 2019 Tim Hortons Brier, Marsh' first appearance at the Canadian men's championship. Representing Saskatchewan, Team Muyres finished with a 5–6 record through the round robin and championship rounds, placing seventh.

The 2019–20 season was less successful for the team, not reaching any finals on tour. Their best finishes came at the 2019 Hokkaido Bank Curling Classic and the Medicine Hat Charity Classic where they lost in the semifinals. In Grand Slam play, the team made the semifinals of the 2019 Tour Challenge Tier 2 event and missed the playoffs at the 2020 Canadian Open, going 0–3. Their disappointing season ended in a second-place finish at the 2020 SaskTel Tankard. Despite winning the A event and the 1 vs. 2 game, they lost 4–2 in the final to Team Dunstone. The team broke up shortly after the season and the Marsh brothers rejoined Colton Flasch and added Catlin Schneider, formerly second of Team Dunstone, for the 2020–21 season.

The new Team Flasch played in a limited number of events during the 2020–21 season due to the pandemic. Of the three events they participated in, they won two local events in Saskatoon. Due to the COVID-19 pandemic in Canada, the qualification process for the 2021 Canadian Olympic Curling Trials had to be modified to qualify enough teams for the championship. In these modifications, Curling Canada created the 2021 Canadian Curling Trials Direct-Entry Event, an event where five teams would compete to try to earn one of three spots into the 2021 Canadian Olympic Curling Trials. Team Flasch qualified for the Trials Direct-Entry Event due to their World Ranking. The team went 1–3 through the round-robin, finishing in fourth place and not advancing directly to the Trials. Team Flasch had one final chance to advance to the Olympic Trials through the 2021 Canadian Olympic Curling Pre-Trials, however, they lost their final two round robin games and did not advance to the playoff round. Elsewhere on tour, the team had back-to-back semifinal finishes at the IG Wealth Management Western Showdown and the Nufloors Penticton Curling Classic. They also finished runner-up at the Red Deer Curling Classic after losing to the Ryan Jacques rink in the final. Entering the 2022 SaskTel Tankard, Team Flasch were the second ranked team behind the Matt Dunstone rink. After losing two games early in the triple knockout event, the team rallied off four straight victories to reach the provincial final where they faced the Dunstone rink. Following a single in the ninth end to take the lead, Team Flasch stole a point in the tenth end to upset Team Dunstone and win the provincial title. The win earned them the right to represent Saskatchewan at the 2022 Tim Hortons Brier where they finished with a 6–2 round robin record, including a victory over the Dunstone rink in the final draw. They then had to play Dunstone (representing Wild Card) again in a tiebreaker, which they won 9–5. In the playoffs, they knocked off Northern Ontario's Brad Jacobs rink before losing to former teammates in Alberta's Koe rink and Brad Gushue's Wild Card team, settling for fourth. They ended their season at the 2022 Players' Championship Grand Slam event where they missed the playoffs.

== Personal life ==
Marsh is employed as a teacher with the Saskatchewan Distance Learning Corporation. His twin brother Kevin is the second on his team.

== Teams ==
Season	Skip	Third	Second	Lead
2008–09	Aaron Shutra	Kevin Marsh	Dan Marsh	Chris Regiger
2009–10	Dallan Muyres	Matt Ryback	Dan Marsh	Aaron Shutra
2010–11	Kevin Marsh	Matt Ryback	Dan Marsh	Aaron Shutra
2011–12	Kevin Marsh	Matt Ryback	Dan Marsh	Aaron Shutra
2012–13	Kevin Marsh	Matt Ryback	Dan Marsh	Aaron Shutra
2013–14	Kevin Marsh	Matt Ryback	Dan Marsh	Aaron Shutra
2014–15	Kevin Marsh	Matt Ryback	Dan Marsh	Aaron Shutra
2015–16	Bruce Korte	Kevin Marsh	Dan Marsh	Matt Lang
2016–17	Bruce Korte	Kevin Marsh	Dan Marsh	Matt Lang
2017–18	Colton Flasch	Kevin Marsh	Dan Marsh	Trent Knapp
2018–19	Kirk Muyres	Kevin Marsh	Dan Marsh	Dallan Muyres
2019–20	Kirk Muyres	Kevin Marsh	Dan Marsh	Dallan Muyres
2020–21	Colton Flasch	Catlin Schneider	Kevin Marsh	Dan Marsh
2021–22	Colton Flasch	Catlin Schneider	Kevin Marsh	Dan Marsh
2022–23	Colton Flasch	Catlin Schneider	Kevin Marsh	Dan Marsh
2023–24	Mike McEwen	Colton Flasch	Kevin Marsh	Dan Marsh
2024–25	Mike McEwen	Colton Flasch	Kevin Marsh	Dan Marsh
2025–26	Mike McEwen	Colton Flasch	Kevin Marsh	Dan Marsh
2026–27	Tyler Tardi	Colton Flasch	Kevin Marsh	Dan Marsh
