= 2016 SaskTel Tankard =

Provincial men's curling championship for Saskatchewan

- Host city: Kindersley, Saskatchewan
- Arena: Kindersley Curling Club
- Dates: February 3–7
- Winner: Steve Laycock
- Curling club: Nutana CC, Saskatoon
- Skip: Steve Laycock
- Third: Kirk Muyres
- Second: Colton Flasch
- Lead: Dallan Muyres
- Finalist: Shaun Meachem

The 2016 SaskTel Tankard, the provincial men's curling championship for Saskatchewan, was held from February 3 to 7 at the Kindersley Curling Club in Kindersley. The winning team (Steve Laycock) represented Saskatchewan at the 2016 Tim Hortons Brier in Ottawa.

== Teams ==
The teams are listed as follows:

| Skip | Third | Second | Lead | Locale(s) |
|---|---|---|---|---|
| Jason Ackerman | Curtis Horwath | Brent Goeres | Mike Armstrong | Highland Curling Club, Regina |
| Scott Bitz | Jeff Sharp | Aryn Scmhidt | Derek Ryan | Highland Curling Club, Regina |
| Randy Bryden | Troy Robinson | Kelly Knapp | Trent Knapp | Callie Curling Club, Regina |
| Darren Camm | Dean Grindheim | Mark Steckler | Anthony Sepke | Sutherland Curling Club, Saskatoon |
| William Coutts | Stuart Coutts | Dean Clark | Todd Bakken | Highland Curling Club, Regina |
| Ryan Deis | Scott Manners | Jason McPhee | Kalin Deis | Fox Valley Curling Club, Fox Valley |
| Brent Gedak | Clint Dieno | Derek Owens | Shawn Meyer | Estevan Curling Club, Estevan |
| Kody Hartung | Tyler Hartung | Jeff Hartung | Claire Decock | Langenburg Curling Club, Langenburg |
| Brad Heidt | Dew Heidt | Mitch Heidt | Regis Neumeier | Kerrobert Curling Club, Kerrobert |
| Josh Heidt | Brock Montgomery | Matt Ryback | Dustin Kidby | Kerrobert Curling Club, Kerrobert |
| Jason Jacobson | Dustin Kalthoff | Carl deConinck Smith | Rory Golanowski | Nutana Curling Club, Saskatoon |
| Shawn Joyce | Michael Carss | Jason Barnhart | Tyler Matheson | Nutana Curling Club, Saskatoon |
| Dean Kleiter | Warren Jackson | Quinn Hersikorn | Jayden Shwaga | Sutherland Curling Club, Saskatoon |
| Bruce Korte | Kevin Marsh | Dan Marsh | Matthew Lang | Nutana Curling Club, Saskatoon |
| Steve Laycock | Kirk Muyres | Colton Flasch | Dallan Muyres | Nutana Curling Club, Saskatoon |
| Shaun Meachem | Catlin Schneider | Brady Scharback | Aaron Shutra | Nutana Curling Club, Saskatoon |

== Knockout Draw Brackets ==
=== A Event ===
First Knockout
Laycock | 9
Coutts | 3
Ackerman | 6
Bitz | 10
Jacobson | 4
Kleiter | 8
Hartung | 3
Deis | 5
Joyce | 9
Meachem | 8
J. Heidt | 10
Gedak | 4
B. Heidt | 1
Bryden | 9
Korte | 7
Camm | 4

Quarterfinals
Layock | 7
Bitz | 5
Kleiter | 9
Deis | 7
Joyce | 7
J. Heidt | 11
Bryden | 7
Korte | 6

Semifinals
Laycock | 9
Kleiter | 5
J. Heidt | 5
Bryden | 6

Qualifier 1
Laycock | 5
Bryden | 3

=== B Event ===
Second Knockout
Ackerman | 8
Coutts | 2
Meachem | 7
Gedak | 5

Quarterfinals
Deis | 6
Ackerman | 4
Korte | 8
Meachem | 4

Semifinals
Deis | 5
J. Heidt | 7
Korte | 8
Kleiter | 6

To Qualifier 2
J. Heidt | 9
Korte | 8
Qualifier 2
J. Heidt | 9
Bitz | 5

Second Knockout
Hartung | 8
Jacobson | 3
Camm | 8
B. Heidt | 6

Quarterfinals
Hartung | 7
Bitz | 10
Camm | 9
Joyce | 7

Semifinals
Bitz | 8
Camm | 4

To Qualifier 2
Bitz | 8
Bryden | 6

=== C Event ===
Third Knockout
Coutts | 3
Jacobson | 10
Ackerman | 5
Meachem | 6

Quarterfinals
Jacobson | 4
Kleiter | 7
Camm | 6
Meachem | 10

Semifinals
Bryden | 8
Kleiter | 1
Meachem | 6
Korte | 2

Qualifier 3
Bryden | 1
Meachem | 4

Third Knockout
Gedak | 8
B. Heidt | 0

Quarterfinals
Gedak | 10
Deis | 8
Hartung | 9
Joyce | 3

Semifinals
Gedak | 8
Hartung | 7

Qualifier 4
Gedak | 8
Bitz | 7

== Playoffs ==
Page playoff system
1 | Steve Laycock | 8
2 | Josh Heidt | 2
3 | Shaun Meachem | 6
4 | Brent Gedak | 4

Semifinal
2 | Josh Heidt | 1
3 | Shaun Meachem | 6

Final
1 | Steve Laycock | 6
3 | Shaun Meachem | 4

=== 1 vs 2 ===
| Sheet 2 | 1 | 2 | 3 | 4 | 5 | 6 | 7 | 8 | 9 | 10 | Final |
|---|---|---|---|---|---|---|---|---|---|---|---|
| Steve Laycock | 0 | 2 | 0 | 0 | 0 | 3 | 0 | 3 | X | X | 8 |
| Josh Heidt | 0 | 0 | 1 | 0 | 0 | 0 | 1 | 0 | X | X | 2 |

=== 3 vs 4 ===
| Sheet 3 | 1 | 2 | 3 | 4 | 5 | 6 | 7 | 8 | 9 | 10 | Final |
|---|---|---|---|---|---|---|---|---|---|---|---|
| Shaun Meachem | 1 | 1 | 0 | 0 | 2 | 0 | 1 | 0 | 1 | X | 6 |
| Brent Gedak | 0 | 0 | 0 | 1 | 0 | 2 | 0 | 1 | 0 | X | 4 |

=== Semifinal ===
| Sheet 2 | 1 | 2 | 3 | 4 | 5 | 6 | 7 | 8 | 9 | 10 | Final |
|---|---|---|---|---|---|---|---|---|---|---|---|
| Josh Heidt | 0 | 0 | 0 | 0 | 0 | 1 | 0 | 0 | 0 | X | 1 |
| Shaun Meachem | 0 | 0 | 0 | 1 | 1 | 0 | 1 | 1 | 2 | X | 6 |

=== Final ===
| Sheet 2 | 1 | 2 | 3 | 4 | 5 | 6 | 7 | 8 | 9 | 10 | Final |
|---|---|---|---|---|---|---|---|---|---|---|---|
| Steve Laycock | 0 | 2 | 1 | 0 | 1 | 0 | 1 | 0 | 0 | 1 | 6 |
| Shaun Meachem | 0 | 0 | 0 | 1 | 0 | 0 | 0 | 2 | 1 | 0 | 4 |

2016 SaskTel Tankard

Steve Laycock
6th Saskatchewan Provincial Championship title
