= Shaun Meachem =

Canadian curler (born 1979)

- Curler
- Born: October 9, 1979 (age 47); Edmonton, Alberta

Team
- Curling club: Swift Current CC, Swift Current, SK
- Skip: Catlin Schneider
- Third: Shaun Meachem
- Second: Brady Scharback
- Lead: Chris Haichert

Curling career
- Member Association: Alberta (2001–2009); Saskatchewan (2009–Present)
- Brier: 1 (2017)
- World Mixed Championship: 1 (2024)

Shaun Myles Meachem (born October 9, 1979 in Edmonton, Alberta) is a Canadian curler from Cabri, Saskatchewan. He currently plays third on Team Catlin Schneider.

== Curling career ==
Meachem grew up in Mayerthorpe, Alberta. He played on a number of teams in Alberta before moving to Saskatchewan in 2009. While in Alberta, Meachem won two World Curling Tour events: the Rainbow Cashspiel in 2004, playing lead for Rob Armitage and again in 2005 playing second for Chris Schille.

After moving to Saskatchewan, Meachem began curling competitively again in 2012, playing third for Max Kirkpatrick. Meachem played in his first Saskatchewan men's provincial at the 2013 SaskTel Tankard, but the Kirkpatrick rink would not make the playoffs. The next season, they again failed to make the playoffs at the 2014 SaskTel Tankard.

Meachem won the 2014 Saskatchewan Mixed Curling Championship with teammates Kelly Wood, Carl deConinck Smith and Kelsey Dutton. They represented the province at the 2014 Canadian Mixed Curling Championship, losing to Ontario's Cory Heggestad in the semifinal.

In 2014 Meachem joined the Drew Heidt rink, throwing fourth stones for the team. They would win one WCT event that season, winning the BV Inn Curling Classic. At the 2015 SaskTel Tankard the team would miss the playoffs.

In 2015 Meachem formed his own team as skip, with teammates Catlin Schneider, Brady Scharback and Aaron Shutra. The team would win two WCT events in their first season together, the HDF Insurance Shoot-Out and the Medicine Hat Charity Classic. The team went all the way to the finals of the 2016 SaskTel Tankard, where they lost to Steve Laycock. The team qualified for Meachem's first Grand Slam of Curling event, the season-ending 2016 Humpty's Champions Cup, where they went 0–4.

In 2017, Meachem, along with teammates Adam Casey, Catlin Schneider, and Dustin Kidby defeated Steve Laycock to win the 2017 SaskTel Tankard. Meachem represented Saskatchewan at the 2017 Tim Hortons Brier, where they finished with a 5-6 record. The team played in the 2017 Canadian Olympic Curling Pre-Trials, with Brock Montgomery replacing Schneider. The team finished with a 2–4 record. Later in the season, the team played in the 2018 SaskTel Tankard, but were eliminated in the C event.

In 2018, Meachem formed a new team, playing third with teammates Dustin Kalthoff, Bryaden Stewart, and Jared Latos. The team curled out of the Nutana Curling Club in Saskatoon, Saskatchewan. The rink played in the 2019 SaskTel Tankard, losing in one of the C event finals.

Meachem, along with teammates Kelly Schafer, Chris Haichert and Teejay Haichert represented Saskatchewan at the 2020 Canadian Mixed Curling Championship. There, he led his team to a 5–5 record.

Meachem formed a new men's team in 2019 as a skip, with teammates Brady Scharback, Brayden Stewart and Jared Latos. He once again lost in one of the C event finals at the 2020 SaskTel Tankard. On the Tour, the team won the Saskatoon Nutana Cash, and the Farmers Edge SCT events that season. The team played in the 2021 Canadian Curling Pre-Trials Direct-Entry Event with Tyler Hartung sparing for Stewart. The team lost in the C event. The team also lost in the C event at the 2022 SaskTel Tankard. On the tour, they won the 2021 SaskTour Men's Highland event.

Meachem, Schafer and the Haicherts represented Saskatchewan again at the 2022 Canadian Mixed Curling Championship. This time, he led the rink to a 6–4 record, but did not make the playoffs.

In 2022, Meachem joined the Steve Laycock rink at third, with Chris Haichert at second and Brayden Stewart at lead. The team played in the 2023 SaskTel Tankard, where they made it all the way to the final before losing to Kelly Knapp.

Meachem, Schafer, and the Haicherts represented Saskatchewan again at the 2023 Canadian Mixed Curling Championship on home ice. The team lost just one game in the event, and beat Manitoba in the final. They represented Canada at the 2024 World Mixed Curling Championship, where they went undefeated before being upset in the round of 16 to the Netherlands.

== Personal life ==
Meachem is the owner of Meach Construction Ltd. He is married to Marla Phillips and has three children.
