= Nutana Curling Club =

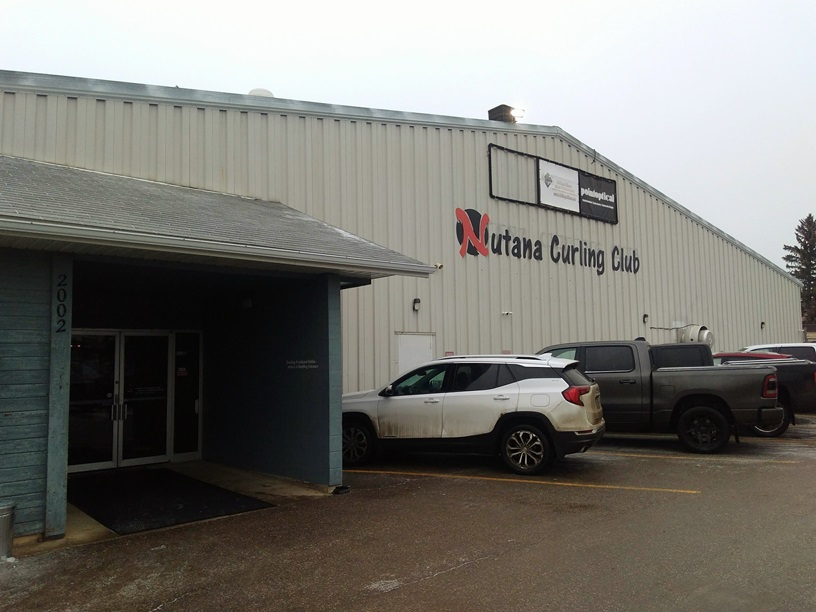
- Interactive map of Nutana Curling Club
- Location: 2002 Arlington Avenue; Saskatoon, Saskatchewan S7J 2H5

Information
- Established: 1929
- Founder: Joint Stock Company
- Club type: Dedicated Ice
- Curling Canada region: SCA Saskatoon Region
- Sheets of ice: Eight
- Rock colours: Red and yellow
- Website: http://www.nutanacurlingclub.ca/

The Nutana Curling Club is a curling club located in Saskatoon, Saskatchewan, Canada. Established in 1929 and first opening its doors in 1930, the club was originally located in the city's historic Nutana neighbourhood. The club relocated to the south-central Nutana Suburban Centre neighbourhood in 1966. Once one of six curling clubs in Saskatoon, Nutana is one of three clubs still operating along with the Sutherland Curling Club and the CN Curling Club.

Nutana has been home to seventeen provincial men's champions—one of which, the Rick Folk rink, went on to win national and world titles—and ten provincial and two national women's champions.

== History ==
The Nutana Curling Club was organized in 1929 at the Nutana Collegiate Institute. The club first opened on 1 January, 1930 at the corner of Dufferin Avenue and Main Street in the Nutana neighbourhood. In 1966, it moved to its current location at the corner of Arlington Avenue and Taylor Street in Nutana Suburban Centre.

=== Major events ===
The club has hosted a number of annual and national events in its history. It hosts the annual Colonial Square Ladies Classic, one of the women's events on the World Curling Tour and a former Grand Slam of Curling event. It hosts the annual College Clean Restoration Curling Classic on the men's World Curling Tour. Nutana hosted the 1993 TSN Skins Game and the 1999 Canadian Senior Curling Championships. In 2009 and 2019, it hosted the Canadian Masters Curling Championships. In 2022, Nutana began hosting a new cashspiel event geared towards under-30 teams, called the SGI Canada Best of the West Championship. The event was conceived as a way to offer young curlers more opportunities to transition from junior curling and to compete late in the season. The club hosted the 2025 Canadian U18 Curling Championships.

=== Prairie Lily Curling League ===
In 2014, the club began hosting the Prairie Lily Curling League, the province's first LGBT curling league. The league grew from seven teams in 2014 to eighteen by 2020, and teams from the league took first and second place at the 2017 Canadian Pride Curling Championships in Montreal. Nutana hosted the championship in 2022, with the club's Dustin Anderson rink winning the event.

== Champions ==
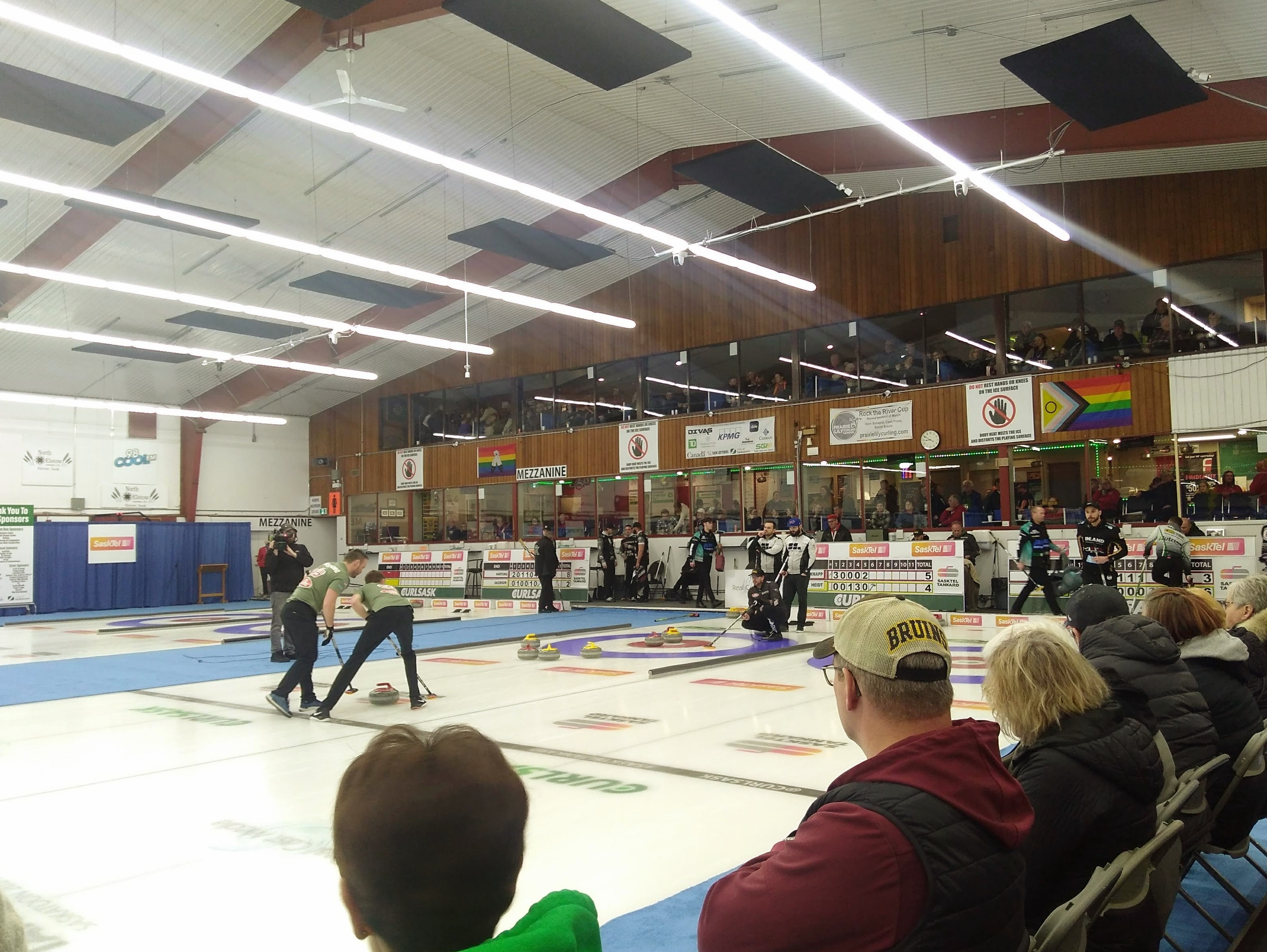
Nutana hosted the 2024 SaskTel Tankard. The event was won by Mike McEwen's Nutana rink.

Nutana has been the home of seventeen men's provincial champions, including nine since 2010. Charles Anderson's team was the first, winning the Macdonald Tankard in 1934. The Rick Folk rink won three consecutive Tankards from 1978 to 1980, and in 1980 went on to win the Labatt Brier and the Air Canada Silver Broom—the men's world championship. Steve Laycock won seven Tankards, including five as skip and four out of Nutana. Mike McEwen's rink won the 2024 SaskTel Tankard, which was also hosted by Nutana; they went on to finish second at the national championship, and qualified for the Brier as a Wild Card entry in both 2025 and 2026. 2025 marked the sixth time that Nutana teams won both the men's and women's provincial titles in the same year, with the Ryland Kleiter and Nancy Martin rinks winning their respective titles. The first time this happened was in 1985, when Sheila Rowan's rink won their second provincial Scotties and Eugene Hritzuk's rink won their first of two Tankards. Maybell Spooner was the first women's rink from Nutana to win the provincial title, in 1952. Dorenda Schoenhals and Emily Farnham's national titles in 1970 and 1974 were part of a run of six straight national champions from the province—all of them predated the establishment of the women's world championships in 1979.

The club has also seen success at the junior and senior levels. Three Nutana rinks have secured Canadian women's junior championships, including Marliese Miller's rink in 2003 that went on to win the World Junior Curling Championship, the first team to do so with a perfect record. With Laycock's junior team out of Sutherland also winning gold, 2003 marked the first time that men's and women's junior teams from the same country, let alone the same city, won the world title. Former Tankard champion Hritzuk secured Canadian and World Seniors titles in 2008 and 2009, and won a Canadian Masters Championship in 2014. Sherry Anderson won an unprecedented five consecutive Canadian Seniors titles between 2017 and 2022, winning a record three World Seniors titles along the way, the last one in 2023.

Rick Folk also skipped rinks that regularly contended at the Canadian Mixed Curling Championships, winning the national title in 1974 and 1983, while finishing as runner-up in 1981 and 1982. Bruce Korte's mixed rink was runner-up at the 2016 national championships.

Nutana's Kory Kohuch rink won the men's Canadian Curling Club Championship in 2014; Kohuch's team also won silver at the 2016 Championship and participated for a third time in 2018.

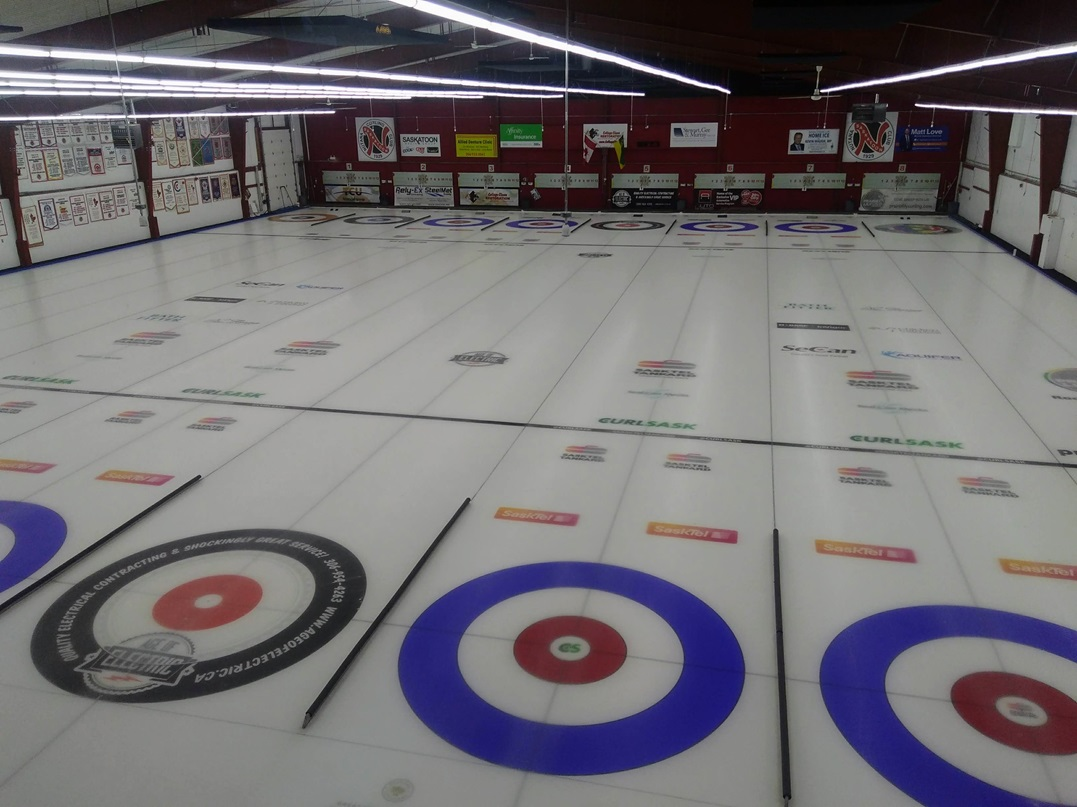
Ice sheets at Nutana Curling Club.

=== List of champions ===
Major titles by Nutana rinks
Year	Event	Skip	Third	Second	Lead	Nationals record
2025	SaskTel Tankard	Rylan Kleiter	Joshua Mattern	Matthew Hall	Trevor Johnson	3–5
2025	Viterra Prairie Pinnacle	Nancy Martin	Chaelynn Stewart	Kadriana Lott	Deanna Doig	5–3
2025	Canadian Senior Curling Championship	Bruce Korte	Darrell McKee	Kory Kohuch	Rory Golanowski	11–1
2024	SaskTel Tankard	Mike McEwen	Colton Flasch	Kevin Marsh	Dan Marsh	10–3
2024	Viterra Tournament of Hearts	Skylar Ackerman	Ashley Thevenot	Taylor Stremick	Kaylin Skinner	4–4
2023	World Senior Curling Championship	Sherry Anderson	Patty Hersikorn	Brenda Goertzen	Anita Silvernagle	9–3
2022	Canadian Senior Curling Championship	Sherry Anderson	Patty Hersikorn	Brenda Goertzen	Anita Silvernagle	9–3
2022	SaskTel Tankard	Colton Flasch	Catlin Schneider	Kevin Marsh	Dan Marsh	8–4
2021	Canadian Senior Curling Championship	Sherry Anderson	Patty Hersikorn	Brenda Goertzen	Anita Silvernagle	10–2
2019	SaskTel Tankard	Kirk Muyres	Kevin Marsh	Dan Marsh	Dallan Muyres	5–6
2019	Canadian Senior Curling Championship; World Senior Curling Championship	Sherry Anderson	Patty Hersikorn	Brenda Goertzen	Anita Silvernagle	8–0
2019	Canadian Senior Curling Championship	Bruce Korte	Darrell McKee	Kory Kohuch	Rory Golanowski	8–0
2018	SaskTel Tankard	Steve Laycock	Matt Dunstone (Note: Dunstone threw fourth stones, with Laycock skipping.)	Kirk Muyres	Dallan Muyres	6–5
2018	Viterra Tournament of Hearts	Sherry Anderson	Kourtney Fesser	Krista Fesser	Karlee Korchinksi	2–5
2018	Canadian Senior Curling Championship; World Senior Curling Championship	Sherry Anderson	Patty Hersikorn	Brenda Goertzen	Anita Silvernagle	10–2
2017	Canadian Senior Curling Championship	Sherry Anderson	Patty Hersikorn	Brenda Goertzen	Anita Silvernagle	6–3
2016	SaskTel Tankard	Steve Laycock	Kirk Muyres	Colton Flasch	Dallan Muyres	5–6
2015	SaskTel Tankard	Steve Laycock	Kirk Muyres	Colton Flasch	Dallan Muyres	8–5
2015	Viterra Tournament of Hearts	Stefanie Lawton	Sherry Anderson	Sherri Singler	Marliese Kasner	9–5
2014	SaskTel Tankard	Steve Laycock	Kirk Muyres	Colton Flasch	Dallan Muyres	6–5
2014	Scotties Tournament of Hearts	Stefanie Lawton	Sherry Anderson	Sherri Singler	Marliese Kasner	8–5
2014	Canadian Masters Curling Championship	Eugene Hritzuk	Jim Wilson	Verne Anderson	Dave Folk	11–1
2014	Canadian Curling Club Championship	Kory Kohuch	Mark Adams	Wes Lang	David Schmirler	7–1
2010	SaskTel Tankard	Darrell McKee	Bruce Korte	Roger Korte	Rob Marksowsky	4–7
2011	Canadian Junior Curling Championship	Trish Paulsen	Kari Kennedy	Kari Paulsen	Natalie Yanko	11–3
2009	World Senior Curling Championship	Eugene Hritzuk	Kevin Kalthoff	Verne Anderson	Dave Folk	11–2
2008	Canadian Senior Curling Championship	Eugene Hritzuk	Kevin Kalthoff	Verne Anderson	Dave Folk	11–2
2003	Canadian Junior Curling Championship; World Junior Curling Championship	Marliese Miller	Tejay Surik	Janelle Lemon	Chelsey Bell	12–2
2000	Canadian Junior Curling Championship	Stefanie Miller	Marliese Miller	Stacy Helm	Amanda MacDonald	11–3
1988	Labatt Tankard	Eugene Hritzuk	Del Shaughnessy	Murray Soparlo	Don Dabrowski	9–4
1985	Labatt Tankard	Eugene Hritzuk	Bob Miller	Nick Paulsen	Art Paulsen	8–6
1985	Scott Tournament of Hearts	Sheila Rowan	Jean MacLean	Maureen Burkitt	Eileen Wilson	3–7
1983	Canadian Mixed Curling Championship	Rick Folk	Dorenda Schoenhals	Tom Wilson	Elizabeth Folk	12–1
1983	Scott Tournament of Hearts	Sheila Rowan	Jean MacLean	Judy Sefton	Lil Martin	4–6
1980	Labatt Tankard; Labatt Brier; Air Canada Silver Broom	Rick Folk	Ron Mills	Tom Wilson	Jim Wilson	10–2
1979	Macdonald Tankard	Rick Folk	Rod Thompson	Tom Wilson	Jim Wilson	8–3
1978	Macdonald Tankard	Rick Folk	Rod Thompson	Tom Wilson	Roger Schmidt	8–3
1974	Canadian Mixed Curling Championship	Rick Folk	Cheryl Stirton	Tom Wilson	Bonnie Orchard	10–1
1974	Saskatchewan Lassie; Macdonald Lassies Championship	Emily Farnham	Linda Saunders	Pat McBeath	Donna Collins	9–0
1970	Provincial Women's Curling Championship; Canadian Ladies Curling Association Championship	Dorenda Schoenhals	Cheryl Stirton	Linda Burnham	Joan Anderson	8–2
1952	Provincial Ladies Curling Championship	Maybell Spooner	Eileen Sexsmith	Phillis Barclay	Merle Dertell	—
1946	Macdonald Tankard	Dalt Henderson	Jack Brower	Cliff Annable	Monty Burns	5–4
1935	Macdonald Tankard	Jimmy Black	Frank Germaine	Sid Peat	Reg Fraser	4–3
1934	Macdonald Tankard	Charles Anderson	R. B. McLeod	Edward Robertson	Pat McNeill	4–3

== See also ==
- List of curling clubs in Saskatchewan
