= Catlin Schneider =

Canadian curler (born 1991)

- Curler
- Born: October 17, 1991 (age 35); Regina, Saskatchewan, Canada

Team
- Skip: Catlin Schneider
- Third: Shaun Meachem
- Second: Brady Scharback
- Lead: Chris Haichert

Curling career
- Member Association: Saskatchewan (2010–2017; 2018–2023; 2026–present); British Columbia (2017–2018; 2023–2024); Manitoba (2024–2026)
- Brier: 5 (2017, 2020, 2022, 2024, 2025)
- Top CTRS ranking: 7th (2018–19; 2019–20)
- Grand Slam victories: 1 (2019 Masters)
Medal record
Representing Saskatchewan
Tim Hortons Brier
Bronze medal – third place	2020 Kingston

Catlin Schneider (born October 17, 1991) is a Canadian curler from the Rural Municipality of Edenwold No. 158. He currently skips his own team out of Regina.

== Career ==
Born in Regina, Saskatchewan, Schneider was a two-sport athlete at university, playing both football and curling for the University of Regina. In football, Schneider was a wide receiver. In curling, he skipped the University of Regina curling team at the 2014 CIS/CCA Curling Championships on home ice. There, he led his team of Mathew Ring, Rory McCusker and Brendan Ryan to a 2-5 record, missing the playoffs.

After university, Schneider joined the Brent Gedak team in 2014, throwing third stones on the team. The team played in the 2015 SaskTel Tankard, the Saskatchewan men's provincial championship, but failed to qualify for the playoffs. The next season, Schneider joined the Shaun Meachem team, continuing at third. The team won two tour events that season, the Medicine Hat Charity Classic and the HDF Insurance Shoot-Out and played in one Grand Slam event, the 2016 Humpty's Champions Cup, where the lost all of their games. The team played in the 2016 SaskTel Tankard, making it all the way to final, where they lost to Team Steve Laycock. The next year, the team added Adam Casey from Prince Edward Island to throw last rocks, and eventually took over skipping duties for the rink. The team won the 2017 SaskTel Tankard, qualifying the team to represent the province at the 2017 Tim Hortons Brier. There, the team finished the round robin with a 5-6 record, missing the playoffs. After the Brier, Schneider joined the Morris team to sub in for Rick Sawatsky, who was injured. He played in two slams on Team Morris, losing in a tiebreaker at the 2017 Players' Championship and losing in the quarterfinals of the 2017 Humpty's Champions Cup. Schneider continued to play for the team the next season, playing in the 2017 GSOC Tour Challenge, going 0-4 and at the 2017 Masters of Curling, again going 0-4. The team found more success at the 2017 Canadian Olympic Pre-trials, winning the A event, qualifying the team the right to play at the 2017 Canadian Olympic Curling Trials. There, the team posted a 3-5 record, missing the playoffs.

Schneider joined the new team of Matt Dunstone, Braeden Moskowy and Dustin Kidby for the 2018–19 season. The team was invited to represent Canada at the third leg of the 2018-19 Curling World Cup. The team won the event, defeating Team Sweden's Niklas Edin rink in the final.

In their first event of the 2019-20 season, Team Dunstone finished runner-up at the Stu Sells Oakville Tankard to John Epping. Dunstone also won his first career Grand Slam at the 2019 Masters where he defeated Brad Gushue in the final. They fell into a slump after their huge win at the slam, not able to qualify at the Tour Challenge, National or Canadian Open and finishing winless at the 2019 Canada Cup. They were able to turn things around at the 2020 SaskTel Tankard. After falling into the C Event, Team Dunstone won four straight games including defeating Kirk Muyres in the final to win the provincial championship. At the 2020 Tim Hortons Brier, they finished the round robin and championship pool with a 8–3 record which qualified them for the 1 vs. 2 game against Alberta's Brendan Bottcher. They lost the game 9–4 and then lost the semifinal to Newfoundland and Labrador's Gushue, settling for a bronze medal. It would be the team's last event of the season as both the Players' Championship and the Champions Cup Grand Slam events were cancelled due to the COVID-19 pandemic. After the season, Team Dunstone replaced Schneider with Kirk Muyres. Schneider then joined the newly-formed Colton Flasch team at third with brothers Kevin and Dan Marsh for the 2020–21 season.

The new Team Flasch played in a limited number of events during the 2020–21 season due to the pandemic. Of the three events they participated in, they won two local events in Saskatoon. Due to the COVID-19 pandemic in Canada, the qualification process for the 2021 Canadian Olympic Curling Trials had to be modified to qualify enough teams for the championship. In these modifications, Curling Canada created the 2021 Canadian Curling Trials Direct-Entry Event, an event where five teams would compete to try to earn one of three spots into the 2021 Canadian Olympic Curling Trials. Team Flasch qualified for the Trials Direct-Entry Event due to their World Ranking. The team went 1–3 through the round-robin, finishing in fourth place and not advancing directly to the Trials. Team Flasch had one final chance to advance to the Olympic Trials through the 2021 Canadian Olympic Curling Pre-Trials, however, they lost their final two round robin games and did not advance to the playoff round. Elsewhere on tour, the team had back-to-back semifinal finishes at the IG Wealth Management Western Showdown and the Nufloors Penticton Curling Classic. They also finished runner-up at the Red Deer Curling Classic after losing to the Ryan Jacques rink in the final. Entering the 2022 SaskTel Tankard, Team Flasch were the second ranked team behind the Matt Dunstone rink. After losing two games early in the triple knockout event, the team rallied off four straight victories to reach the provincial final where they faced the Dunstone rink. Following a single in the ninth end to take the lead, Team Flasch stole a point in the tenth end to upset Team Dunstone and win the provincial title. The win earned them the right to represent Saskatchewan at the 2022 Tim Hortons Brier where they finished with a 6–2 round robin record, including a victory over the Dunstone rink in the final draw. They then had to play Dunstone (representing Wild Card) again in a tiebreaker, which they won 9–5. In the playoffs, they knocked off Northern Ontario's Brad Jacobs rink before losing to former teammates in Alberta's Koe rink and Brad Gushue's Wild Card team, settling for fourth. They ended their season at the 2022 Players' Championship Grand Slam event where they missed the playoffs.

In mixed doubles play, Schneider has played in two Canadian Mixed Doubles Curling Championships with partner Nancy Martin. They lost in the round of 12 in 2016 and missed the playoffs in 2017.

== Personal life ==
Schneider's hometown is White City, Saskatchewan. He attended Greenall High School. He is currently employed as a co-owner and engineer at Prairie Sun Solar. He comes from a big curling family; his sister is Lorraine Schneider who represented Saskatchewan at the 2017 Scotties Tournament of Hearts, and his father, Jamie, played in the 1990 Labatt Brier with three of his uncles. His cousins Kim and Tammy Schneider won the 2011 Scotties Tournament of Hearts and represented Canada at the 2011 World Women's Curling Championship.

== Teams ==
Season	Skip	Third	Second	Lead
2010–11	Kody Hartung	Catlin Schneider	Jeff Hartung	Jayden Shwaga
2013–14	Catlin Schneider	Mat Ring	Rory McCusker	Brendan Ryan
2014–15	Brent Gedak	Catlin Schneider	Derek Owens	Shawn Meyer
2015–16	Shaun Meachem	Catlin Schneider	Brady Scharback	Aaron Shutra
2016–17	Adam Casey (Fourth)	Catlin Schneider	Shaun Meachem (Skip)	Dustin Kidby
2017–18	Jim Cotter (Fourth)	John Morris (Skip)	Catlin Schneider	Tyrel Griffith
2018–19	Matt Dunstone	Braeden Moskowy	Catlin Schneider	Dustin Kidby
2019–20	Matt Dunstone	Braeden Moskowy	Catlin Schneider	Dustin Kidby
2020–21	Colton Flasch	Catlin Schneider	Kevin Marsh	Dan Marsh
2021–22	Colton Flasch	Catlin Schneider	Kevin Marsh	Dan Marsh
2022–23	Colton Flasch	Catlin Schneider	Kevin Marsh	Dan Marsh
2023–24	Catlin Schneider	Jason Ginter	Sterling Middleton	Alex Horvath
2024–25	Reid Carruthers	Catlin Schneider; B. J. Neufeld (from Jan. 2025)	Derek Samagalski (until Nov. 2024); Kyle Doering (from Nov. 2024); Catlin Schneider	Connor Njegovan
2025–26	Reid Carruthers	B. J. Neufeld	Catlin Schneider	Connor Njegovan
2026–27	Catlin Schneider	Shaun Meachem	Brady Scharback	Chris Haichert
