= WLG =

WLG may refer to:

- Wellington International Airport (IATA code), Wellington, New Zealand
- White light generation, a process broadening the spectrum of a laser pulse
- William Lloyd Garrison, a U.S. abolitionist
- Without loss of generality, a frequently used expression in mathematics
- World Leadership Group, Multi-level marketing company founded by Hubert Humphrey (businessman)
