= World Group =

World Group may refer to:

- In Davis Cup structure, the World Group groups the top national men's tennis teams
- In Fed Cup structure, World Group I and World Group II are the top and next-to-top national women's tennis teams
- World Group Securities, registered NASD broker-dealer

== See also ==
- Oneworld, airline alliance
