= WGS =

WGS may refer to:

== Places ==
- Watergardens railway station, Melbourne, Australia
- Wisbech Grammar School, Cambridgeshire, England
- Withington Girls' School, Manchester, England
- Wolverhampton Grammar School, Wolverhampton, England

== Science and technology ==
- Whole genome sequencing, of an organism
- World Geodetic System, in navigation
- Wideband Global SATCOM, in military communication
- Water gas shift reaction, a chemical reaction

== Other uses ==
- Welsh Gender Service
- Women's and Gender Studies, in academia
- World Gourmet Summit, a food festival in Singapore
- World Group Securities, a finance firm
