= HGI =

HGI may refer to:

- Croatian Civic Initiative (Croatian/Montenegrin: Hrvatska građanska inicijativa)
- Hardgrove Grindability Index
- Hegemon Group International: Multi-level marketing company founded by Hubert Humphrey (businessman)
- Hilton Garden Inn
- Home Gateway Initiative
- Houston Galveston Institute
