= 2025 Masters (January) =

Grand Slam of Curling event

2025 WFG Masters
- Host city: Guelph, Ontario
- Arena: Sleeman Centre
- Dates: January 14–19
- Men's winner: (Scotland) Team Whyte
- Curling club: The Peak (Stirling), Stirling
- Skip: Ross Whyte
- Third: Robin Brydone
- Second: Duncan McFadzean
- Lead: Euan Kyle
- Coach: Alistair Scott
- Finalist: (Alberta) Brad Jacobs
- Women's winner: (Sweden) Team Hasselborg
- Curling club: Sundbybergs CK, Sundbyberg
- Skip: Anna Hasselborg
- Third: Sara McManus
- Second: Agnes Knochenhauer
- Lead: Sofia Mabergs
- Alternate: Johanna Heldin
- Coach: Kristian Lindström
- Finalist: (Ontario) Rachel Homan

The 2025 WFG Masters was held from January 14 to 19 at the Sleeman Centre in Guelph, Ontario. It was the fourth Grand Slam event and third major of the 2024–25 curling season.

A new scoring rule is being tested at the event where a team will lose the hammer after two consecutive blank ends. The decision was made following three straight blanks between Brad Gushue and Mike McEwen in their round robin match at the 2024 National. The goal is to increase scoring and make the game more entertaining for spectators.

For the first time in Slam history, a draft was held to select the round robin pools. The top four seeds on both the men's and women's sides chose their opponents via snake order with the top seeds Bruce Mouat and Rachel Homan getting first pick as well as their choice of crossover pool. The pools were chosen by teams Mouat, Yannick Schwaller, Mike McEwen and Brad Gushue on the men's side and Homan, Silvana Tirinzoni, Kerri Einarson and Kim Eun-jung on the women's side.

Teams Jordon McDonald, Kayla Skrlik and Danielle Inglis made their top tier Grand Slam debut.

Prior to the event, elite curlers representing 15 men's and 15 women's teams released a "Proposal for Fair Play in Curling" outlining concerns over new foam pad technologies being used by some teams. Their worry was that the new foam, despite being compliant with World Curling specifications "appears to enhance sweeping performance", contrary to the goals of the 2016 sweeping summit, which was held following the Broomgate scandal. Team John Epping was one rink that used the new foam broomheads, which were manufactured by BalancePlus. His rink was asked not to use them for the event.

For the first time since 2006, Brad Gushue finished with a winless record at a Grand Slam of Curling event.

Following the round robin, the top three seeded teams got to choose their playoff opponents for the quarterfinal round. It was the first time the quarterfinal matchups were decided in this way. The choices were made, in order, by Brad Jacobs, Matt Dunstone and Ross Whyte on the men's side and Anna Hasselborg, Kim Eun-jung and Rachel Homan on the women's side.

== Qualification ==
Sixteen teams will compete in the Masters. They include the seven top-ranked teams on the World Curling Federation's Order of Merit rankings as of December 10, 2024, the seven top teams on the Year-to-Date rankings as of December 10, the Tier 2 winner of the 2024 Tour Challenge, and a sponsor's exemption. In the women's division, the top eight teams on the Year-to-Date rankings qualified as Tier 2 winner Christina Black accepted an invitation to the 2024 National instead of the Masters as it conflicts with the 2025 Nova Scotia Scotties Tournament of Hearts.

=== Men ===
Top men's teams as of December 10:

| # | Order of Merit | Year-to-Date |
|---|---|---|
| 1 | 1. (Scotland) Bruce Mouat | 1. (Scotland) ~~Bruce Mouat~~; 2. (Switzerland) Yannick Schwaller |
| 2 | 2. (Switzerland) ~~Yannick Schwaller~~; 3. (Newfoundland and Labrador) Brad Gushue | 3. (Saskatchewan) Mike McEwen |
| 3 | 4. (Italy) Joël Retornaz | 4. (Manitoba) Matt Dunstone |
| 4 | 5. (Alberta) Brad Jacobs | 5. (Newfoundland and Labrador) ~~Brad Gushue~~; 6. (Germany) Marc Muskatewitz |
| 5 | 6. (Saskatchewan) ~~Mike McEwen~~; 7. (Scotland) Ross Whyte | 7. (Alberta) ~~Brad Jacobs~~; 8. (Switzerland) Marco Hösli |
| 6 | 8. (Manitoba) ~~Matt Dunstone~~; 9. (Germany) ~~Marc Muskatewitz~~; 10. (Sweden) Niklas Edin | 9. (Scotland) ~~Ross Whyte~~; 10. (Italy) ~~Joël Retornaz~~; 11. (Ontario) John Epping |
| 7 | 11. (Switzerland) ~~Marco Hösli~~; 12. (Ontario) ~~John Epping~~; 13. (Norway) Magnus Ramsfjell | 12. (Norway) ~~Magnus Ramsfjell~~; 13. (Sweden) ~~Niklas Edin~~; 14. (Manitoba) Jordon McDonald |

Tour Challenge Tier 2 winner:

- (Saskatchewan) Rylan Kleiter

Sponsor's exemption:

- (United States) Korey Dropkin (Note: No sponsor's exemption was qualified on the men's side. The spot was given to the next ranked team on the Year-to-Date standings, Korey Dropkin.)

=== Women ===
Top women's teams as of December 10:

| # | Order of Merit | Year-to-Date |
|---|---|---|
| 1 | 1. (Ontario) Rachel Homan | 1. (Ontario) ~~Rachel Homan~~; 2. (Switzerland) Silvana Tirinzoni |
| 2 | 2. (Switzerland) ~~Silvana Tirinzoni~~; 3. (South Korea) Gim Eun-ji | 3. (Manitoba) Kerri Einarson |
| 3 | 4. (Sweden) Anna Hasselborg | 4. (Sweden) ~~Anna Hasselborg~~; 5. (South Korea) Kim Eun-jung |
| 4 | 5. (Manitoba) ~~Kerri Einarson~~; 6. (South Korea) ~~Kim Eun-jung~~; 7. (Japan) Satsuki Fujisawa | 6. (Japan) ~~Satsuki Fujisawa~~; 7. (South Korea) ~~Gim Eun-ji~~; 8. (South Korea) Ha Seung-youn |
| 5 | 8. (Switzerland) Xenia Schwaller | 9. (Japan) Momoha Tabata |
| 6 | 9. (Italy) Stefania Constantini | 10. (Switzerland) ~~Xenia Schwaller~~; 11. (Japan) ~~Sayaka Yoshimura~~; 12. (Italy) ~~Stefania Constantini~~; 13. (Alberta) Kayla Skrlik |
| 7 | 10. (South Korea) ~~Ha Seung-youn~~; 11. (Japan) ~~Momoha Tabata~~; 12. (Japan) ~~Sayaka Yoshimura~~; 13. (Sweden) Isabella Wranå | 14. (Japan) Ikue Kitazawa |
| 8 | —N/a | 15. (Nova Scotia) ~~Christina Black~~; 16. (Manitoba) Kaitlyn Lawes |

Sponsor's exemption:

- (Ontario) Danielle Inglis

== Men ==
=== Teams ===
The teams are listed as follows:

| Skip | Third | Second | Lead | Alternate | Locale |
|---|---|---|---|---|---|
| Korey Dropkin | Thomas Howell | Andrew Stopera | Mark Fenner | | (United States) Duluth, Minnesota |
| Matt Dunstone | Colton Lott | E. J. Harnden | Ryan Harnden | | Winnipeg, Manitoba |
| Niklas Edin | Oskar Eriksson | Rasmus Wranå | Christoffer Sundgren | | Karlstad, Sweden |
| John Epping | Jacob Horgan | Tanner Horgan | Ian McMillan | | Sudbury, Ontario |
| Brad Gushue | Mark Nichols | Brendan Bottcher | Geoff Walker | | St. John's, Newfoundland and Labrador |
| Philipp Hösli (Fourth) | Marco Hösli (Skip) | Simon Gloor | Justin Hausherr | | Glarus, Switzerland |
| Brad Jacobs | Marc Kennedy | Brett Gallant | Ben Hebert | | Calgary, Alberta |
| Rylan Kleiter | Joshua Mattern | Matthew Hall | Trevor Johnson | | Saskatoon, Saskatchewan |
| Jordon McDonald | Dallas Burgess | Elias Huminicki | Cameron Olafson | | Winnipeg, Manitoba |
| Mike McEwen | Colton Flasch | Kevin Marsh | Dan Marsh | | Saskatoon, Saskatchewan |
| Bruce Mouat | Grant Hardie | Bobby Lammie | Hammy McMillan Jr. | | Edinburgh, Scotland |
| Marc Muskatewitz | Benjamin Kapp | Felix Messenzehl | Johannes Scheuerl | Mario Trevisiol | Füssen, Germany |
| Magnus Ramsfjell | Martin Sesaker | Bendik Ramsfjell | Gaute Nepstad | | Trondheim, Norway |
| Joël Retornaz | Amos Mosaner | Sebastiano Arman | Mattia Giovanella | | Trentino, Italy |
| Benoît Schwarz-van Berkel (Fourth) | Yannick Schwaller (Skip) | Sven Michel | Pablo Lachat | | Geneva, Switzerland |
| Ross Whyte | Robin Brydone | Duncan McFadzean | Euan Kyle | | Stirling, Scotland |

=== Round robin standings ===
Final Round Robin Standings

Key
| Teams to Playoffs |
| Teams to Tiebreakers |

| Pool A | W | L | PF | PA | LSD |
|---|---|---|---|---|---|
| (Scotland) Bruce Mouat | 3 | 1 | 21 | 14 | 22.3 |
| (Sweden) Niklas Edin | 2 | 2 | 20 | 26 | 33 |
| (Switzerland) Marco Hösli | 1 | 3 | 20 | 21 | 41.5 |
| (Manitoba) Jordon McDonald | 1 | 3 | 13 | 22 | 291.8 |

| Pool C | W | L | PF | PA | LSD |
|---|---|---|---|---|---|
| (Alberta) Brad Jacobs | 4 | 0 | 29 | 14 | 10.4 |
| (Ontario) John Epping | 2 | 2 | 22 | 23 | 33.5 |
| (United States) Korey Dropkin | 2 | 2 | 25 | 21 | 135.7 |
| (Saskatchewan) Mike McEwen | 1 | 3 | 17 | 26 | 16.8 |

| Pool B | W | L | PF | PA | LSD |
|---|---|---|---|---|---|
| (Manitoba) Matt Dunstone | 4 | 0 | 25 | 13 | 20.7 |
| (Switzerland) Yannick Schwaller | 2 | 2 | 26 | 16 | 55.8 |
| (Italy) Joël Retornaz | 2 | 2 | 20 | 19 | 109.9 |
| (Saskatchewan) Rylan Kleiter | 1 | 3 | 14 | 26 | 29.8 |

| Pool D | W | L | PF | PA | LSD |
|---|---|---|---|---|---|
| (Scotland) Ross Whyte | 3 | 1 | 26 | 21 | 0 |
| (Germany) Marc Muskatewitz | 3 | 1 | 18 | 17 | 100.1 |
| (Norway) Magnus Ramsfjell | 1 | 3 | 22 | 26 | 168.1 |
| (Newfoundland and Labrador) Brad Gushue | 0 | 4 | 17 | 30 | 50.7 |

=== Round robin results ===
All draw times are listed in Eastern Time (UTC−05:00).

==== Draw 2 ====
Tuesday, January 14, 11:30 am

| Sheet A | 1 | 2 | 3 | 4 | 5 | 6 | 7 | 8 | Final |
| (Saskatchewan) Mike McEwen 🔨 | 2 | 0 | 0 | 1 | 0 | 0 | 0 | 0 | 3 |
| (United States) Korey Dropkin | 0 | 2 | 0 | 0 | 1 | 1 | 1 | 3 | 8 |

| Sheet B | 1 | 2 | 3 | 4 | 5 | 6 | 7 | 8 | Final |
| (Scotland) Bruce Mouat 🔨 | 0 | 2 | 0 | 0 | 1 | 0 | 1 | X | 4 |
| (Manitoba) Jordon McDonald | 0 | 0 | 0 | 1 | 0 | 1 | 0 | X | 2 |

| Sheet C | 1 | 2 | 3 | 4 | 5 | 6 | 7 | 8 | Final |
| (Alberta) Brad Jacobs 🔨 | 2 | 0 | 1 | 0 | 1 | 0 | 1 | X | 5 |
| (Ontario) John Epping | 0 | 1 | 0 | 2 | 0 | 0 | 0 | X | 3 |

| Sheet D | 1 | 2 | 3 | 4 | 5 | 6 | 7 | 8 | Final |
| (Switzerland) Marco Hösli 🔨 | 0 | 4 | 1 | 0 | 5 | X | X | X | 10 |
| (Sweden) Niklas Edin | 1 | 0 | 0 | 1 | 0 | X | X | X | 2 |

==== Draw 4 ====
Tuesday, January 14, 6:30 pm

| Sheet A | 1 | 2 | 3 | 4 | 5 | 6 | 7 | 8 | Final |
| (Germany) Marc Muskatewitz 🔨 | 0 | 2 | 0 | 2 | 0 | 1 | 0 | X | 5 |
| (Scotland) Ross Whyte | 0 | 0 | 2 | 0 | 0 | 0 | 1 | X | 3 |

| Sheet B | 1 | 2 | 3 | 4 | 5 | 6 | 7 | 8 | Final |
| (Manitoba) Matt Dunstone 🔨 | 1 | 1 | 0 | 1 | 0 | 2 | 0 | 1 | 6 |
| (Italy) Joël Retornaz | 0 | 0 | 2 | 0 | 2 | 0 | 1 | 0 | 5 |

| Sheet C | 1 | 2 | 3 | 4 | 5 | 6 | 7 | 8 | Final |
| (Switzerland) Yannick Schwaller 🔨 | 2 | 0 | 3 | 0 | 2 | 3 | X | X | 10 |
| (Saskatchewan) Rylan Kleiter | 0 | 1 | 0 | 1 | 0 | 0 | X | X | 2 |

| Sheet D | 1 | 2 | 3 | 4 | 5 | 6 | 7 | 8 | Final |
| (Newfoundland and Labrador) Brad Gushue | 0 | 0 | 3 | 0 | 2 | 0 | 1 | 0 | 6 |
| (Norway) Magnus Ramsfjell 🔨 | 0 | 2 | 0 | 2 | 0 | 2 | 0 | 1 | 7 |

==== Draw 5 ====
Wednesday, January 15, 8:00 am

| Sheet A | 1 | 2 | 3 | 4 | 5 | 6 | 7 | 8 | Final |
| (Scotland) Bruce Mouat 🔨 | 2 | 0 | 2 | 0 | 2 | 1 | X | X | 7 |
| (Switzerland) Marco Hösli | 0 | 1 | 0 | 1 | 0 | 0 | X | X | 2 |

| Sheet B | 1 | 2 | 3 | 4 | 5 | 6 | 7 | 8 | Final |
| (Saskatchewan) Mike McEwen 🔨 | 2 | 0 | 2 | 0 | 2 | 0 | 2 | X | 8 |
| (Ontario) John Epping | 0 | 2 | 0 | 3 | 0 | 1 | 0 | X | 6 |

| Sheet C | 1 | 2 | 3 | 4 | 5 | 6 | 7 | 8 | Final |
| (Sweden) Niklas Edin 🔨 | 2 | 0 | 1 | 1 | 0 | 2 | 0 | 1 | 7 |
| (Manitoba) Jordon McDonald | 0 | 1 | 0 | 0 | 2 | 0 | 1 | 0 | 4 |

| Sheet D | 1 | 2 | 3 | 4 | 5 | 6 | 7 | 8 | Final |
| (Alberta) Brad Jacobs 🔨 | 3 | 0 | 2 | 3 | 0 | 2 | X | X | 10 |
| (United States) Korey Dropkin | 0 | 0 | 0 | 0 | 4 | 0 | X | X | 4 |

==== Draw 7 ====
Wednesday, January 15, 3:30 pm

| Sheet A | 1 | 2 | 3 | 4 | 5 | 6 | 7 | 8 | Final |
| (Italy) Joël Retornaz | 0 | 2 | 0 | 0 | 2 | 0 | 0 | 1 | 5 |
| (Saskatchewan) Rylan Kleiter 🔨 | 1 | 0 | 1 | 0 | 0 | 2 | 0 | 0 | 4 |

| Sheet B | 1 | 2 | 3 | 4 | 5 | 6 | 7 | 8 | 9 | Final |
| (Scotland) Ross Whyte 🔨 | 2 | 0 | 1 | 0 | 2 | 0 | 2 | 0 | 1 | 8 |
| (Norway) Magnus Ramsfjell | 0 | 2 | 0 | 2 | 0 | 2 | 0 | 1 | 0 | 7 |

| Sheet C | 1 | 2 | 3 | 4 | 5 | 6 | 7 | 8 | Final |
| (Newfoundland and Labrador) Brad Gushue 🔨 | 0 | 0 | 0 | 2 | 1 | 0 | 0 | 0 | 3 |
| (Germany) Marc Muskatewitz | 0 | 1 | 1 | 0 | 0 | 1 | 0 | 1 | 4 |

| Sheet D | 1 | 2 | 3 | 4 | 5 | 6 | 7 | 8 | Final |
| (Switzerland) Yannick Schwaller 🔨 | 1 | 0 | 1 | 0 | 0 | 1 | 0 | X | 3 |
| (Manitoba) Matt Dunstone | 0 | 2 | 0 | 1 | 1 | 0 | 1 | X | 5 |

==== Draw 9 ====
Thursday, January 16, 8:00 am

| Sheet A | 1 | 2 | 3 | 4 | 5 | 6 | 7 | 8 | Final |
| (Newfoundland and Labrador) Brad Gushue | 0 | 0 | 2 | 0 | 0 | 2 | 0 | X | 4 |
| (Scotland) Ross Whyte 🔨 | 2 | 1 | 0 | 0 | 1 | 0 | 5 | X | 9 |

| Sheet B | 1 | 2 | 3 | 4 | 5 | 6 | 7 | 8 | Final |
| (Manitoba) Matt Dunstone 🔨 | 0 | 2 | 1 | 2 | 0 | 2 | X | X | 7 |
| (Saskatchewan) Rylan Kleiter | 0 | 0 | 0 | 0 | 1 | 0 | X | X | 1 |

| Sheet C | 1 | 2 | 3 | 4 | 5 | 6 | 7 | 8 | Final |
| (Switzerland) Yannick Schwaller | 0 | 1 | 0 | 1 | 0 | 0 | 1 | 0 | 3 |
| (Italy) Joël Retornaz 🔨 | 1 | 0 | 1 | 0 | 0 | 2 | 0 | 1 | 5 |

| Sheet D | 1 | 2 | 3 | 4 | 5 | 6 | 7 | 8 | 9 | Final |
| (Germany) Marc Muskatewitz 🔨 | 1 | 0 | 1 | 0 | 1 | 1 | 0 | 0 | 1 | 5 |
| (Norway) Magnus Ramsfjell | 0 | 1 | 0 | 1 | 0 | 0 | 1 | 1 | 0 | 4 |

==== Draw 11 ====
Thursday, January 16, 3:30 pm

| Sheet A | 1 | 2 | 3 | 4 | 5 | 6 | 7 | 8 | Final |
| (Saskatchewan) Mike McEwen 🔨 | 0 | 2 | 0 | 0 | 2 | 0 | 0 | X | 4 |
| (Alberta) Brad Jacobs | 0 | 0 | 2 | 3 | 0 | 1 | 1 | X | 7 |

| Sheet B | 1 | 2 | 3 | 4 | 5 | 6 | 7 | 8 | Final |
| (Switzerland) Marco Hösli | 1 | 0 | 0 | 0 | 1 | 1 | 0 | 0 | 3 |
| (Manitoba) Jordon McDonald 🔨 | 0 | 1 | 1 | 1 | 0 | 0 | 1 | 1 | 5 |

| Sheet C | 1 | 2 | 3 | 4 | 5 | 6 | 7 | 8 | 9 | Final |
| (Ontario) John Epping 🔨 | 0 | 2 | 0 | 1 | 0 | 0 | 2 | 0 | 1 | 6 |
| (United States) Korey Dropkin | 1 | 0 | 1 | 0 | 0 | 2 | 0 | 1 | 0 | 5 |

| Sheet D | 1 | 2 | 3 | 4 | 5 | 6 | 7 | 8 | Final |
| (Scotland) Bruce Mouat | 0 | 1 | 0 | 2 | 0 | 2 | 0 | 0 | 5 |
| (Sweden) Niklas Edin 🔨 | 1 | 0 | 1 | 0 | 2 | 0 | 0 | 4 | 8 |

==== Draw 14 ====
Friday, January 17, 11:30 am

| Sheet A | 1 | 2 | 3 | 4 | 5 | 6 | 7 | 8 | Final |
| (Norway) Magnus Ramsfjell | 0 | 2 | 0 | 0 | 0 | 2 | 0 | X | 4 |
| (Saskatchewan) Rylan Kleiter 🔨 | 2 | 0 | 1 | 3 | 1 | 0 | 0 | X | 7 |

| Sheet B | 1 | 2 | 3 | 4 | 5 | 6 | 7 | 8 | Final |
| (Switzerland) Yannick Schwaller | 0 | 0 | 1 | 0 | 4 | 1 | 4 | X | 10 |
| (Newfoundland and Labrador) Brad Gushue 🔨 | 3 | 0 | 0 | 1 | 0 | 0 | 0 | X | 4 |

| Sheet C | 1 | 2 | 3 | 4 | 5 | 6 | 7 | 8 | Final |
| (Manitoba) Matt Dunstone 🔨 | 1 | 0 | 1 | 0 | 2 | 0 | 1 | 2 | 7 |
| (Germany) Marc Muskatewitz | 0 | 2 | 0 | 1 | 0 | 1 | 0 | 0 | 4 |

| Sheet D | 1 | 2 | 3 | 4 | 5 | 6 | 7 | 8 | Final |
| (Scotland) Ross Whyte 🔨 | 0 | 2 | 0 | 1 | 0 | 2 | 0 | 1 | 6 |
| (Italy) Joël Retornaz | 0 | 0 | 2 | 0 | 1 | 0 | 2 | 0 | 5 |

==== Draw 16 ====
Friday, January 17, 7:30 pm

| Sheet A | 1 | 2 | 3 | 4 | 5 | 6 | 7 | 8 | 9 | Final |
| (Switzerland) Marco Hösli 🔨 | 0 | 1 | 0 | 1 | 0 | 2 | 0 | 1 | 0 | 5 |
| (Ontario) John Epping | 1 | 0 | 1 | 0 | 2 | 0 | 1 | 0 | 2 | 7 |

| Sheet B | 1 | 2 | 3 | 4 | 5 | 6 | 7 | 8 | Final |
| (Alberta) Brad Jacobs | 5 | 0 | 1 | 1 | 0 | X | X | X | 7 |
| (Sweden) Niklas Edin 🔨 | 0 | 1 | 0 | 0 | 2 | X | X | X | 3 |

| Sheet C | 1 | 2 | 3 | 4 | 5 | 6 | 7 | 8 | Final |
| (Scotland) Bruce Mouat | 0 | 0 | 1 | 0 | 1 | 3 | 0 | X | 5 |
| (Saskatchewan) Mike McEwen 🔨 | 0 | 1 | 0 | 0 | 0 | 0 | 1 | X | 2 |

| Sheet D | 1 | 2 | 3 | 4 | 5 | 6 | 7 | 8 | Final |
| (Manitoba) Jordon McDonald | 0 | 1 | 0 | 1 | 0 | 0 | X | X | 2 |
| (United States) Korey Dropkin 🔨 | 1 | 0 | 3 | 0 | 1 | 3 | X | X | 8 |

=== Tiebreakers ===
Saturday, January 18, 7:30 am

| Sheet A | 1 | 2 | 3 | 4 | 5 | 6 | 7 | 8 | Final |
| (Switzerland) Yannick Schwaller 🔨 | 3 | 1 | 1 | 0 | 3 | X | X | X | 8 |
| (Italy) Joël Retornaz | 0 | 0 | 0 | 1 | 0 | X | X | X | 1 |

Player percentages
| (Switzerland) Team Schwaller | | (Italy) Team Retornaz | |
|---|---|---|---|
| Pablo Lachat | 95% | Mattia Giovanella | 100% |
| Sven Michel | 93% | Sebastiano Arman | 85% |
| Yannick Schwaller | 95% | Amos Mosaner | 90% |
| Benoît Schwarz-van Berkel | 98% | Joël Retornaz | 70% |
| Total | 95% | Total | 86% |

| Sheet B | 1 | 2 | 3 | 4 | 5 | 6 | 7 | 8 | Final |
| (Ontario) John Epping | 0 | 1 | 0 | 1 | 0 | 3 | 0 | X | 5 |
| (United States) Korey Dropkin 🔨 | 3 | 0 | 3 | 0 | 1 | 0 | 1 | X | 8 |

Player percentages
| (Ontario) Team Epping | | (United States) Team Dropkin | |
|---|---|---|---|
| Ian McMillan | 95% | Mark Fenner | 97% |
| Tanner Horgan | 94% | Andrew Stopera | 94% |
| Jacob Horgan | 86% | Thomas Howell | 83% |
| John Epping | 84% | Korey Dropkin | 83% |
| Total | 90% | Total | 89% |

=== Playoffs ===
Quarterfinals
1 | (Alberta) Brad Jacobs | 7
5 | (Germany) Marc Muskatewitz | 4
4 | (Scotland) Bruce Mouat | 8
7 | (Switzerland) Yannick Schwaller | 2
2 | (Manitoba) Matt Dunstone | 7
8 | (United States) Korey Dropkin | 5
3 | (Scotland) Ross Whyte | 5
6 | (Sweden) Niklas Edin | 2

Semifinals
1 | (Alberta) Brad Jacobs | 7
4 | (Scotland) Bruce Mouat | 5
2 | (Manitoba) Matt Dunstone | 5
3 | (Scotland) Ross Whyte | 7

Final
1 | (Alberta) Brad Jacobs | 4
3 | (Scotland) Ross Whyte | 5

==== Quarterfinals ====
Saturday, January 18, 11:00 am

| Sheet A | 1 | 2 | 3 | 4 | 5 | 6 | 7 | 8 | Final |
| (Alberta) Brad Jacobs 🔨 | 4 | 0 | 1 | 0 | 1 | 0 | 1 | X | 7 |
| (Germany) Marc Muskatewitz | 0 | 2 | 0 | 1 | 0 | 1 | 0 | X | 4 |

Player percentages
| (Alberta) Team Jacobs | | (Germany) Team Muskatewitz | |
|---|---|---|---|
| Ben Hebert | 92% | Johannes Scheuerl | 95% |
| Brett Gallant | 95% | Felix Messenzehl | 94% |
| Marc Kennedy | 95% | Benjamin Kapp | 84% |
| Brad Jacobs | 89% | Marc Muskatewitz | 88% |
| Total | 93% | Total | 90% |

| Sheet B | 1 | 2 | 3 | 4 | 5 | 6 | 7 | 8 | Final |
| (Scotland) Bruce Mouat 🔨 | 3 | 0 | 0 | 2 | 0 | 3 | X | X | 8 |
| (Switzerland) Yannick Schwaller | 0 | 1 | 0 | 0 | 1 | 0 | X | X | 2 |

Player percentages
| (Scotland) Team Mouat | | (Switzerland) Team Schwaller | |
|---|---|---|---|
| Hammy McMillan Jr. | 96% | Pablo Lachat | 96% |
| Bobby Lammie | 85% | Sven Michel | 88% |
| Grant Hardie | 94% | Yannick Schwaller | 92% |
| Bruce Mouat | 96% | Benoît Schwarz-van Berkel | 69% |
| Total | 93% | Total | 86% |

| Sheet C | 1 | 2 | 3 | 4 | 5 | 6 | 7 | 8 | Final |
| (Scotland) Ross Whyte 🔨 | 0 | 1 | 0 | 2 | 1 | 0 | 0 | 1 | 5 |
| (Sweden) Niklas Edin | 0 | 0 | 1 | 0 | 0 | 0 | 1 | 0 | 2 |

Player percentages
| (Scotland) Team Whyte | | (Sweden) Team Edin | |
|---|---|---|---|
| Euan Kyle | 86% | Christoffer Sundgren | 97% |
| Duncan McFadzean | 95% | Rasmus Wranå | 89% |
| Robin Brydone | 92% | Oskar Eriksson | 89% |
| Ross Whyte | 94% | Niklas Edin | 88% |
| Total | 92% | Total | 91% |

| Sheet D | 1 | 2 | 3 | 4 | 5 | 6 | 7 | 8 | Final |
| (Manitoba) Matt Dunstone 🔨 | 1 | 1 | 0 | 2 | 0 | 2 | 0 | 1 | 7 |
| (United States) Korey Dropkin | 0 | 0 | 2 | 0 | 1 | 0 | 2 | 0 | 5 |

Player percentages
| (Manitoba) Team Dunstone | | (United States) Team Dropkin | |
|---|---|---|---|
| Ryan Harnden | 92% | Mark Fenner | 94% |
| E. J. Harnden | 90% | Andrew Stopera | 92% |
| Colton Lott | 94% | Thomas Howell | 94% |
| Matt Dunstone | 85% | Korey Dropkin | 85% |
| Total | 90% | Total | 91% |

==== Semifinals ====
Saturday, January 18, 7:00 pm

| Sheet B | 1 | 2 | 3 | 4 | 5 | 6 | 7 | 8 | Final |
| (Manitoba) Matt Dunstone 🔨 | 2 | 0 | 1 | 0 | 0 | 0 | 2 | 0 | 5 |
| (Scotland) Ross Whyte | 0 | 1 | 0 | 3 | 0 | 2 | 0 | 1 | 7 |

Player percentages
| (Manitoba) Team Dunstone | | (Scotland) Team Whyte | |
|---|---|---|---|
| Ryan Harnden | 92% | Euan Kyle | 95% |
| E. J. Harnden | 92% | Duncan McFadzean | 97% |
| Colton Lott | 88% | Robin Brydone | 98% |
| Matt Dunstone | 86% | Ross Whyte | 89% |
| Total | 89% | Total | 95% |

| Sheet C | 1 | 2 | 3 | 4 | 5 | 6 | 7 | 8 | Final |
| (Alberta) Brad Jacobs 🔨 | 2 | 0 | 2 | 0 | 0 | 2 | 0 | 1 | 7 |
| (Scotland) Bruce Mouat | 0 | 2 | 0 | 1 | 0 | 0 | 2 | 0 | 5 |

Player percentages
| (Alberta) Team Jacobs | | (Scotland) Team Mouat | |
|---|---|---|---|
| Ben Hebert | 94% | Hammy McMillan Jr. | 97% |
| Brett Gallant | 78% | Bobby Lammie | 83% |
| Marc Kennedy | 89% | Grant Hardie | 95% |
| Brad Jacobs | 97% | Bruce Mouat | 83% |
| Total | 89% | Total | 89% |

==== Final ====
Sunday, January 19, 12:00 pm

| Sheet C | 1 | 2 | 3 | 4 | 5 | 6 | 7 | 8 | Final |
| (Alberta) Brad Jacobs 🔨 | 0 | 1 | 0 | 0 | 2 | 0 | 1 | 0 | 4 |
| (Scotland) Ross Whyte | 0 | 0 | 0 | 1 | 0 | 2 | 0 | 2 | 5 |

Player percentages
| (Alberta) Team Jacobs | | (Scotland) Team Whyte | |
|---|---|---|---|
| Ben Hebert | 95% | Euan Kyle | 100% |
| Brett Gallant | 94% | Duncan McFadzean | 83% |
| Marc Kennedy | 91% | Robin Brydone | 98% |
| Brad Jacobs | 97% | Ross Whyte | 92% |
| Total | 94% | Total | 93% |

== Women ==
=== Teams ===
The teams are listed as follows:

| Skip | Third | Second | Lead | Alternate | Locale |
|---|---|---|---|---|---|
| Stefania Constantini | Elena Mathis | Marta Lo Deserto (Note: Alternate Marta Lo Deserto spared for Giulia Zardini Lacedelli who was competing at the 2025 Winter World University Games. She played second while second Elena Mathis moved up to third.) | Angela Romei | | Cortina d'Ampezzo, Italy |
| Kerri Einarson | Val Sweeting | Karlee Burgess | Krysten Karwacki | | Gimli, Manitoba |
| Satsuki Fujisawa | Chinami Yoshida | Yumi Suzuki | Yurika Yoshida | | Kitami, Japan |
| Gim Eun-ji | Kim Min-ji | Kim Su-ji | Seol Ye-eun | Seol Ye-ji | Uijeongbu, South Korea |
| Ha Seung-youn | Kim Hye-rin | Yang Tae-i | Kim Su-jin | Park Seo-jin | Chuncheon, South Korea |
| Anna Hasselborg | Sara McManus | Agnes Knochenhauer | Sofia Mabergs | Johanna Heldin | Sundbyberg, Sweden |
| Rachel Homan | Tracy Fleury | Emma Miskew | Sarah Wilkes | | Ottawa, Ontario |
| Danielle Inglis | Kira Brunton | Calissa Daly | Cassandra de Groot | Kim Tuck | Ottawa, Ontario |
| Kim Eun-jung | – (Note: Team Kim played with three players.) | Kim Cho-hi | Kim Seon-yeong | | Gangneung, South Korea |
| Ikue Kitazawa | Seina Nakajima | Ami Enami | Minori Suzuki | Hasumi Ishigooka | Nagano, Japan |
| Kaitlyn Lawes | Selena Njegovan | Jocelyn Peterman | Kristin Gordon | Becca Hebert | Winnipeg, Manitoba |
| Xenia Schwaller | Selina Gafner | Fabienne Rieder | Selina Rychiger | | Zurich, Switzerland |
| Kayla Skrlik | Margot Flemming | Ashton Skrlik | Geri-Lynn Ramsay | | Calgary, Alberta |
| Momoha Tabata (Fourth) | Miku Nihira (Skip) | Sae Yamamoto | Mikoto Nakajima | Ayami Ito | Sapporo, Japan |
| Alina Pätz (Fourth) | Silvana Tirinzoni (Skip) | Carole Howald | Selina Witschonke | | Aarau, Switzerland |
| Isabella Wranå | Almida de Val | Maria Larsson | Linda Stenlund | | Sundbyberg, Sweden |

=== Round robin standings ===
Final Round Robin Standings

Key
| Teams to Playoffs |
| Teams to Tiebreakers |

| Pool A | W | L | PF | PA | LSD |
|---|---|---|---|---|---|
| (Ontario) Rachel Homan | 3 | 1 | 24 | 19 | 26.3 |
| (Sweden) Isabella Wranå | 3 | 1 | 22 | 20 | 46.6 |
| (Manitoba) Kaitlyn Lawes | 2 | 2 | 26 | 21 | 100.1 |
| (South Korea) Ha Seung-youn | 1 | 3 | 21 | 22 | 67.9 |

| Pool C | W | L | PF | PA | LSD |
|---|---|---|---|---|---|
| (Manitoba) Kerri Einarson | 2 | 2 | 21 | 16 | 45.5 |
| (Japan) Team Tabata | 2 | 2 | 19 | 20 | 82.8 |
| (Japan) Satsuki Fujisawa | 2 | 2 | 20 | 19 | 119.6 |
| (Alberta) Kayla Skrlik | 1 | 3 | 14 | 30 | 91.4 |

| Pool B | W | L | PF | PA | LSD |
|---|---|---|---|---|---|
| (Sweden) Anna Hasselborg | 4 | 0 | 28 | 15 | 152 |
| (Switzerland) Silvana Tirinzoni | 2 | 2 | 16 | 21 | 79.3 |
| (Ontario) Danielle Inglis | 2 | 2 | 21 | 15 | 222.2 |
| (Italy) Stefania Constantini | 1 | 3 | 22 | 23 | 194.1 |

| Pool D | W | L | PF | PA | LSD |
|---|---|---|---|---|---|
| (South Korea) Kim Eun-jung | 4 | 0 | 27 | 14 | 173.2 |
| (Japan) Ikue Kitazawa | 2 | 2 | 21 | 24 | 234.6 |
| (Switzerland) Xenia Schwaller | 1 | 3 | 14 | 24 | 248.5 |
| (South Korea) Gim Eun-ji | 0 | 4 | 15 | 28 | 62.5 |

=== Round robin results ===
All draw times are listed in Eastern Time (UTC−05:00).

==== Draw 1 ====
Tuesday, January 14, 8:00 am

| Sheet A | 1 | 2 | 3 | 4 | 5 | 6 | 7 | 8 | Final |
| (South Korea) Gim Eun-ji 🔨 | 0 | 0 | 2 | 0 | 1 | 0 | 1 | 0 | 4 |
| (Japan) Ikue Kitazawa | 0 | 2 | 0 | 1 | 0 | 1 | 0 | 2 | 6 |

| Sheet B | 1 | 2 | 3 | 4 | 5 | 6 | 7 | 8 | 9 | Final |
| (Sweden) Anna Hasselborg 🔨 | 0 | 1 | 0 | 1 | 2 | 0 | 2 | 0 | 1 | 7 |
| (Italy) Stefania Constantini | 0 | 0 | 1 | 0 | 0 | 2 | 0 | 3 | 0 | 6 |

| Sheet C | 1 | 2 | 3 | 4 | 5 | 6 | 7 | 8 | Final |
| (Switzerland) Silvana Tirinzoni | 0 | 0 | 1 | 1 | 0 | 0 | 2 | X | 4 |
| (Ontario) Danielle Inglis 🔨 | 0 | 1 | 0 | 0 | 0 | 1 | 0 | X | 2 |

| Sheet D | 1 | 2 | 3 | 4 | 5 | 6 | 7 | 8 | Final |
| (South Korea) Kim Eun-jung 🔨 | 0 | 1 | 0 | 1 | 0 | 2 | 1 | X | 5 |
| (Switzerland) Xenia Schwaller | 0 | 0 | 0 | 0 | 1 | 0 | 0 | X | 1 |

==== Draw 3 ====
Tuesday, January 14, 3:00 pm

| Sheet A | 1 | 2 | 3 | 4 | 5 | 6 | 7 | 8 | Final |
| (Manitoba) Kerri Einarson 🔨 | 2 | 3 | 1 | 0 | 4 | X | X | X | 10 |
| (Alberta) Kayla Skrlik | 0 | 0 | 0 | 1 | 0 | X | X | X | 1 |

| Sheet B | 1 | 2 | 3 | 4 | 5 | 6 | 7 | 8 | Final |
| (Ontario) Rachel Homan | 0 | 3 | 0 | 2 | 0 | 1 | 0 | 1 | 7 |
| (South Korea) Ha Seung-youn 🔨 | 1 | 0 | 1 | 0 | 1 | 0 | 1 | 0 | 4 |

| Sheet C | 1 | 2 | 3 | 4 | 5 | 6 | 7 | 8 | Final |
| (Japan) Satsuki Fujisawa | 0 | 0 | 1 | 0 | 0 | 1 | 1 | 0 | 3 |
| (Japan) Team Tabata 🔨 | 0 | 1 | 0 | 0 | 2 | 0 | 0 | 2 | 5 |

| Sheet D | 1 | 2 | 3 | 4 | 5 | 6 | 7 | 8 | Final |
| (Manitoba) Kaitlyn Lawes 🔨 | 2 | 0 | 0 | 2 | 1 | 2 | 2 | X | 9 |
| (Sweden) Isabella Wranå | 0 | 2 | 0 | 0 | 0 | 0 | 0 | X | 2 |

==== Draw 6 ====
Wednesday, January 15, 11:30 am

| Sheet A | 1 | 2 | 3 | 4 | 5 | 6 | 7 | 8 | Final |
| (Sweden) Anna Hasselborg | 0 | 2 | 0 | 0 | 1 | 0 | 0 | 2 | 5 |
| (Ontario) Danielle Inglis 🔨 | 1 | 0 | 0 | 1 | 0 | 2 | 0 | 0 | 4 |

| Sheet B | 1 | 2 | 3 | 4 | 5 | 6 | 7 | 8 | 9 | Final |
| (South Korea) Kim Eun-jung | 0 | 3 | 0 | 2 | 0 | 0 | 2 | 0 | 2 | 9 |
| (Japan) Ikue Kitazawa 🔨 | 1 | 0 | 3 | 0 | 1 | 1 | 0 | 1 | 0 | 7 |

| Sheet C | 1 | 2 | 3 | 4 | 5 | 6 | 7 | 8 | Final |
| (South Korea) Gim Eun-ji | 1 | 0 | 1 | 0 | 1 | 0 | 3 | 0 | 6 |
| (Switzerland) Xenia Schwaller 🔨 | 0 | 2 | 0 | 2 | 0 | 2 | 0 | 2 | 8 |

| Sheet D | 1 | 2 | 3 | 4 | 5 | 6 | 7 | 8 | Final |
| (Switzerland) Silvana Tirinzoni 🔨 | 2 | 1 | 0 | 1 | 0 | 2 | 0 | X | 6 |
| (Italy) Stefania Constantini | 0 | 0 | 2 | 0 | 1 | 0 | 1 | X | 4 |

==== Draw 8 ====
Wednesday, January 15, 7:30 pm

| Sheet A | 1 | 2 | 3 | 4 | 5 | 6 | 7 | 8 | Final |
| (South Korea) Ha Seung-youn | 0 | 2 | 0 | 0 | 0 | 1 | 0 | 0 | 3 |
| (Sweden) Isabella Wranå 🔨 | 0 | 0 | 1 | 1 | 1 | 0 | 2 | 1 | 6 |

| Sheet B | 1 | 2 | 3 | 4 | 5 | 6 | 7 | 8 | Final |
| (Manitoba) Kerri Einarson 🔨 | 0 | 1 | 0 | 0 | 2 | 0 | 2 | X | 5 |
| (Japan) Team Tabata | 0 | 0 | 0 | 1 | 0 | 1 | 0 | X | 2 |

| Sheet C | 1 | 2 | 3 | 4 | 5 | 6 | 7 | 8 | 9 | Final |
| (Ontario) Rachel Homan 🔨 | 1 | 0 | 2 | 1 | 0 | 1 | 1 | 0 | 1 | 7 |
| (Manitoba) Kaitlyn Lawes | 0 | 3 | 0 | 0 | 1 | 0 | 0 | 2 | 0 | 6 |

| Sheet D | 1 | 2 | 3 | 4 | 5 | 6 | 7 | 8 | Final |
| (Japan) Satsuki Fujisawa | 2 | 0 | 1 | 2 | 0 | 1 | 0 | X | 6 |
| (Alberta) Kayla Skrlik 🔨 | 0 | 1 | 0 | 0 | 2 | 0 | 0 | X | 3 |

==== Draw 10 ====
Thursday, January 16, 11:30 am

| Sheet A | 1 | 2 | 3 | 4 | 5 | 6 | 7 | 8 | Final |
| (Japan) Team Tabata 🔨 | 2 | 0 | 1 | 0 | 0 | 4 | 0 | X | 7 |
| (Manitoba) Kaitlyn Lawes | 0 | 1 | 0 | 2 | 0 | 0 | 1 | X | 4 |

| Sheet B | 1 | 2 | 3 | 4 | 5 | 6 | 7 | 8 | Final |
| (South Korea) Ha Seung-youn | 1 | 2 | 2 | 0 | 1 | 0 | 3 | X | 9 |
| (Alberta) Kayla Skrlik 🔨 | 0 | 0 | 0 | 1 | 0 | 1 | 0 | X | 2 |

| Sheet C | 1 | 2 | 3 | 4 | 5 | 6 | 7 | 8 | Final |
| (Japan) Satsuki Fujisawa | 0 | 2 | 1 | 0 | 1 | 0 | 0 | X | 4 |
| (Sweden) Isabella Wranå 🔨 | 3 | 0 | 0 | 2 | 0 | 1 | 1 | X | 7 |

| Sheet D | 1 | 2 | 3 | 4 | 5 | 6 | 7 | 8 | Final |
| (Ontario) Rachel Homan 🔨 | 0 | 2 | 0 | 2 | 0 | 0 | 1 | 1 | 6 |
| (Manitoba) Kerri Einarson | 0 | 0 | 1 | 0 | 0 | 1 | 0 | 0 | 2 |

==== Draw 12 ====
Thursday, January 16, 7:30 pm

| Sheet A | 1 | 2 | 3 | 4 | 5 | 6 | 7 | 8 | Final |
| (South Korea) Kim Eun-jung | 0 | 0 | 2 | 0 | 0 | 3 | 1 | X | 6 |
| (South Korea) Gim Eun-ji 🔨 | 0 | 1 | 0 | 0 | 1 | 0 | 0 | X | 2 |

| Sheet B | 1 | 2 | 3 | 4 | 5 | 6 | 7 | 8 | Final |
| (Switzerland) Silvana Tirinzoni | 0 | 0 | 1 | 0 | 1 | 0 | 0 | X | 2 |
| (Sweden) Anna Hasselborg 🔨 | 0 | 3 | 0 | 0 | 0 | 3 | 2 | X | 8 |

| Sheet C | 1 | 2 | 3 | 4 | 5 | 6 | 7 | 8 | Final |
| (Italy) Stefania Constantini | 0 | 1 | 0 | 1 | 0 | 2 | 0 | 0 | 4 |
| (Ontario) Danielle Inglis 🔨 | 1 | 0 | 1 | 0 | 2 | 0 | 2 | 1 | 7 |

| Sheet D | 1 | 2 | 3 | 4 | 5 | 6 | 7 | 8 | Final |
| (Japan) Ikue Kitazawa | 1 | 1 | 1 | 0 | 1 | 1 | 0 | X | 5 |
| (Switzerland) Xenia Schwaller 🔨 | 0 | 0 | 0 | 2 | 0 | 0 | 1 | X | 3 |

==== Draw 13 ====
Friday, January 17, 8:00 am

| Sheet A | 1 | 2 | 3 | 4 | 5 | 6 | 7 | 8 | Final |
| (Ontario) Rachel Homan | 1 | 0 | 2 | 0 | 1 | 0 | 0 | X | 4 |
| (Sweden) Isabella Wranå 🔨 | 0 | 1 | 0 | 1 | 0 | 3 | 2 | X | 7 |

| Sheet B | 1 | 2 | 3 | 4 | 5 | 6 | 7 | 8 | 9 | Final |
| (Manitoba) Kerri Einarson | 0 | 1 | 0 | 1 | 0 | 1 | 1 | 0 | 0 | 4 |
| (Japan) Satsuki Fujisawa 🔨 | 1 | 0 | 1 | 0 | 0 | 0 | 0 | 2 | 3 | 7 |

| Sheet C | 1 | 2 | 3 | 4 | 5 | 6 | 7 | 8 | Final |
| (South Korea) Ha Seung-youn | 0 | 1 | 1 | 0 | 2 | 1 | 0 | X | 5 |
| (Manitoba) Kaitlyn Lawes 🔨 | 4 | 0 | 0 | 2 | 0 | 0 | 1 | X | 7 |

| Sheet D | 1 | 2 | 3 | 4 | 5 | 6 | 7 | 8 | Final |
| (Japan) Team Tabata | 0 | 0 | 2 | 0 | 1 | 0 | 2 | 0 | 5 |
| (Alberta) Kayla Skrlik 🔨 | 1 | 2 | 0 | 1 | 0 | 2 | 0 | 2 | 8 |

==== Draw 15 ====
Friday, January 17, 3:30 pm

| Sheet A | 1 | 2 | 3 | 4 | 5 | 6 | 7 | 8 | Final |
| (Italy) Stefania Constantini 🔨 | 0 | 1 | 0 | 3 | 2 | 1 | 1 | X | 8 |
| (Japan) Ikue Kitazawa | 1 | 0 | 2 | 0 | 0 | 0 | 0 | X | 3 |

| Sheet B | 1 | 2 | 3 | 4 | 5 | 6 | 7 | 8 | Final |
| (Switzerland) Xenia Schwaller 🔨 | 0 | 1 | 0 | 1 | 0 | 0 | X | X | 2 |
| (Ontario) Danielle Inglis | 1 | 0 | 2 | 0 | 4 | 1 | X | X | 8 |

| Sheet C | 1 | 2 | 3 | 4 | 5 | 6 | 7 | 8 | Final |
| (Switzerland) Silvana Tirinzoni | 0 | 0 | 0 | 2 | 0 | 2 | 0 | X | 4 |
| (South Korea) Kim Eun-jung 🔨 | 1 | 1 | 2 | 0 | 2 | 0 | 1 | X | 7 |

| Sheet D | 1 | 2 | 3 | 4 | 5 | 6 | 7 | 8 | Final |
| (Sweden) Anna Hasselborg | 0 | 4 | 0 | 2 | 1 | 1 | X | X | 8 |
| (South Korea) Gim Eun-ji 🔨 | 1 | 0 | 2 | 0 | 0 | 0 | X | X | 3 |

=== Tiebreakers ===
Saturday, January 18, 7:30 am

| Sheet C | 1 | 2 | 3 | 4 | 5 | 6 | 7 | 8 | Final |
| (Japan) Team Tabata 🔨 | 0 | 1 | 0 | 0 | 2 | 1 | 0 | 2 | 6 |
| (Ontario) Danielle Inglis | 1 | 0 | 0 | 2 | 0 | 0 | 1 | 0 | 4 |

Player percentages
| (Japan) Team Tabata | | (Ontario) Team Inglis | |
|---|---|---|---|
| Mikoto Nakajima | 92% | Cassandra de Groot | 81% |
| Sae Yamamoto | 94% | Calissa Daly | 81% |
| Miku Nihira | 67% | Kira Brunton | 92% |
| Momoha Tabata | 78% | Danielle Inglis | 72% |
| Total | 83% | Total | 82% |

| Sheet D | 1 | 2 | 3 | 4 | 5 | 6 | 7 | 8 | 9 | Final |
| (Manitoba) Kaitlyn Lawes | 0 | 0 | 1 | 0 | 1 | 0 | 2 | 0 | 0 | 4 |
| (Japan) Satsuki Fujisawa 🔨 | 0 | 2 | 0 | 0 | 0 | 1 | 0 | 1 | 1 | 5 |

Player percentages
| (Manitoba) Team Lawes | | (Japan) Team Fujisawa | |
|---|---|---|---|
| Kristin Gordon | 84% | Yurika Yoshida | 92% |
| Jocelyn Peterman | 84% | Yumi Suzuki | 81% |
| Selena Njegovan | 84% | Chinami Yoshida | 89% |
| Kaitlyn Lawes | 80% | Satsuki Fujisawa | 86% |
| Total | 83% | Total | 87% |

=== Playoffs ===
Quarterfinals
1 | (Sweden) Anna Hasselborg | 7
7 | (Japan) Team Tabata | 4
4 | (Sweden) Isabella Wranå | 5
5 | (Manitoba) Kerri Einarson | 2
2 | (South Korea) Kim Eun-jung | 8
8 | (Japan) Satsuki Fujisawa | 1
3 | (Ontario) Rachel Homan | 8
6 | (Switzerland) Silvana Tirinzoni | 4

Semifinals
1 | (Sweden) Anna Hasselborg | 6
4 | (Sweden) Isabella Wranå | 3
2 | (South Korea) Kim Eun-jung | 7
3 | (Ontario) Rachel Homan | 10

Final
1 | (Sweden) Anna Hasselborg | 7
3 | (Ontario) Rachel Homan | 5

==== Quarterfinals ====
Saturday, January 18, 3:00 pm

| Sheet A | 1 | 2 | 3 | 4 | 5 | 6 | 7 | 8 | Final |
| (Sweden) Anna Hasselborg 🔨 | 2 | 0 | 1 | 2 | 0 | 0 | 0 | 2 | 7 |
| (Japan) Team Tabata | 0 | 2 | 0 | 0 | 1 | 0 | 1 | 0 | 4 |

Player percentages
| (Sweden) Team Hasselborg | | (Japan) Team Tabata | |
|---|---|---|---|
| Sofia Mabergs | 92% | Mikoto Nakajima | 92% |
| Agnes Knochenhauer | 91% | Sae Yamamoto | 91% |
| Sara McManus | 95% | Miku Nihira | 80% |
| Anna Hasselborg | 89% | Momoha Tabata | 78% |
| Total | 92% | Total | 85% |

| Sheet B | 1 | 2 | 3 | 4 | 5 | 6 | 7 | 8 | Final |
| (South Korea) Kim Eun-jung 🔨 | 1 | 1 | 2 | 0 | 4 | X | X | X | 8 |
| (Japan) Satsuki Fujisawa | 0 | 0 | 0 | 1 | 0 | X | X | X | 1 |

Player percentages
| (South Korea) Team Kim | | (Japan) Team Fujisawa | |
|---|---|---|---|
| Kim Seon-yeong | 93% | Yurika Yoshida | 88% |
| Kim Cho-hi | 97% | Yumi Suzuki | 75% |
| — | | Chinami Yoshida | 60% |
| Kim Eun-jung | 95% | Satsuki Fujisawa | 68% |
| Total | 95% | Total | 73% |

| Sheet C | 1 | 2 | 3 | 4 | 5 | 6 | 7 | 8 | Final |
| (Sweden) Isabella Wranå 🔨 | 2 | 0 | 0 | 1 | 1 | 0 | 1 | X | 5 |
| (Manitoba) Kerri Einarson | 0 | 1 | 0 | 0 | 0 | 1 | 0 | X | 2 |

Player percentages
| (Sweden) Team Wranå | | (Manitoba) Team Einarson | |
|---|---|---|---|
| Linda Stenlund | 91% | Krysten Karwacki | 100% |
| Maria Larsson | 81% | Karlee Burgess | 80% |
| Almida de Val | 92% | Val Sweeting | 88% |
| Isabella Wranå | 97% | Kerri Einarson | 70% |
| Total | 90% | Total | 85% |

| Sheet D | 1 | 2 | 3 | 4 | 5 | 6 | 7 | 8 | Final |
| (Ontario) Rachel Homan 🔨 | 0 | 0 | 3 | 0 | 2 | 0 | 3 | X | 8 |
| (Switzerland) Silvana Tirinzoni | 0 | 1 | 0 | 1 | 0 | 2 | 0 | X | 4 |

Player percentages
| (Ontario) Team Homan | | (Switzerland) Team Tirinzoni | |
|---|---|---|---|
| Sarah Wilkes | 93% | Selina Witschonke | 98% |
| Emma Miskew | 89% | Carole Howald | 84% |
| Tracy Fleury | 82% | Silvana Tirinzoni | 95% |
| Rachel Homan | 88% | Alina Pätz | 91% |
| Total | 88% | Total | 92% |

==== Semifinals ====
Saturday, January 18, 7:00 pm

| Sheet A | 1 | 2 | 3 | 4 | 5 | 6 | 7 | 8 | Final |
| (South Korea) Kim Eun-jung 🔨 | 2 | 0 | 2 | 0 | 1 | 0 | 2 | 0 | 7 |
| (Ontario) Rachel Homan | 0 | 1 | 0 | 3 | 0 | 2 | 0 | 4 | 10 |

Player percentages
| (South Korea) Team Kim | | (Ontario) Team Homan | |
|---|---|---|---|
| Kim Seon-yeong | 93% | Sarah Wilkes | 95% |
| Kim Cho-hi | 89% | Emma Miskew | 89% |
| — | | Tracy Fleury | 91% |
| Kim Eun-jung | 81% | Rachel Homan | 80% |
| Total | 88% | Total | 89% |

| Sheet D | 1 | 2 | 3 | 4 | 5 | 6 | 7 | 8 | Final |
| (Sweden) Anna Hasselborg 🔨 | 0 | 1 | 0 | 1 | 2 | 0 | 2 | X | 6 |
| (Sweden) Isabella Wranå | 0 | 0 | 1 | 0 | 0 | 2 | 0 | X | 3 |

Player percentages
| (Sweden) Team Hasselborg | | (Sweden) Team Wranå | |
|---|---|---|---|
| Sofia Mabergs | 86% | Linda Stenlund | 88% |
| Agnes Knochenhauer | 81% | Maria Larsson | 95% |
| Sara McManus | 92% | Almida de Val | 91% |
| Anna Hasselborg | 97% | Isabella Wranå | 80% |
| Total | 88% | Total | 86% |

==== Final ====
Sunday, January 19, 4:30 pm

| Sheet C | 1 | 2 | 3 | 4 | 5 | 6 | 7 | 8 | Final |
| (Sweden) Anna Hasselborg 🔨 | 2 | 0 | 1 | 1 | 0 | 1 | 0 | 2 | 7 |
| (Ontario) Rachel Homan | 0 | 2 | 0 | 0 | 2 | 0 | 1 | 0 | 5 |

Player percentages
| (Sweden) Team Hasselborg | | (Ontario) Team Homan | |
|---|---|---|---|
| Sofia Mabergs | 97% | Sarah Wilkes | 92% |
| Agnes Knochenhauer | 92% | Emma Miskew | 80% |
| Sara McManus | 89% | Tracy Fleury | 83% |
| Anna Hasselborg | 83% | Rachel Homan | 78% |
| Total | 90% | Total | 83% |
