= Matt Dunstone =

Canadian curler (born 1995)

- Curler
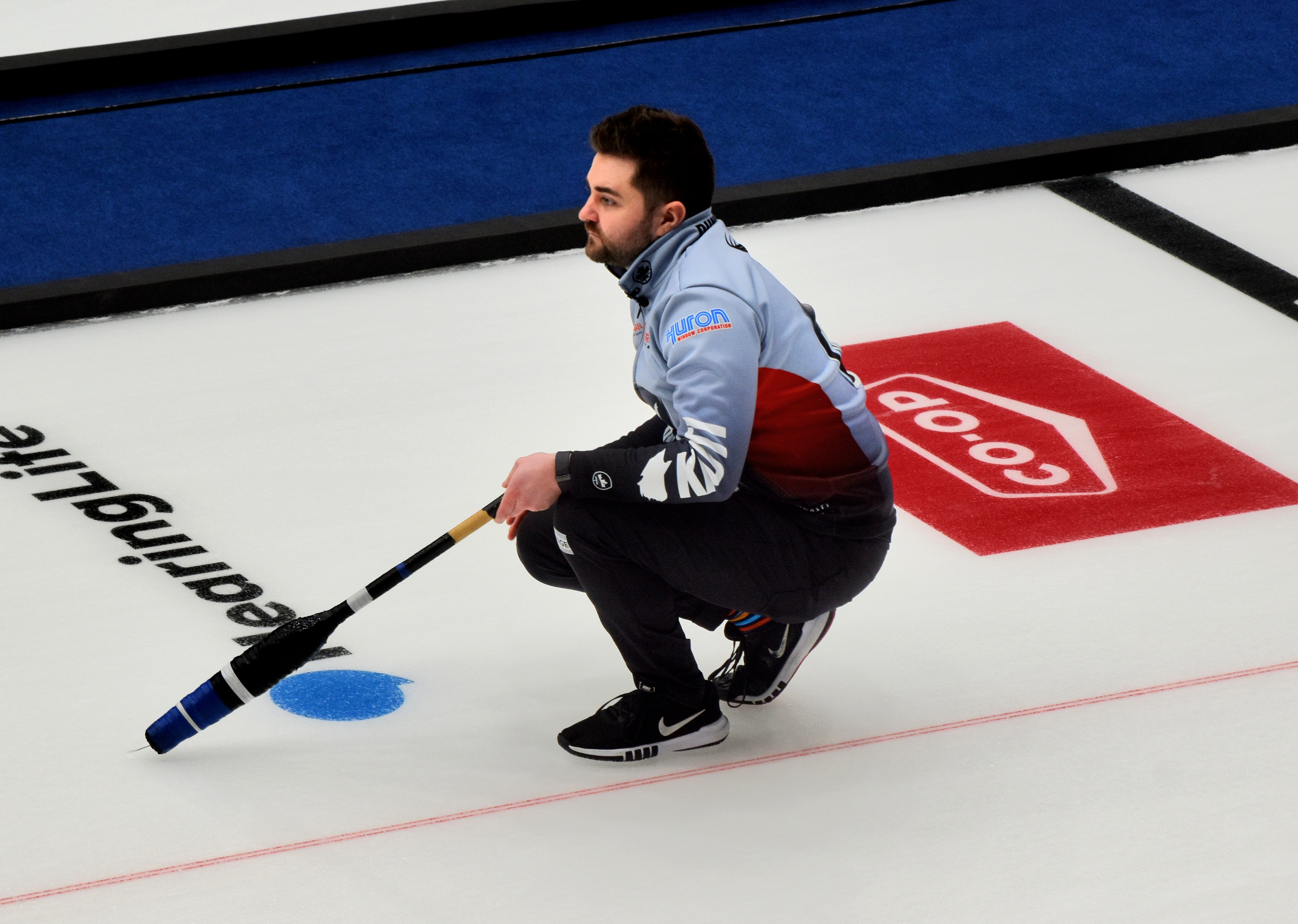
- Born: Matthew Dunstone; June 25, 1995 (age 31); Winnipeg, Manitoba, Canada

Team
- Curling club: Granite CC, Winnipeg, MB
- Skip: Matt Dunstone
- Third: Colton Lott
- Second: Mark Nichols
- Lead: Ryan Harnden

Curling career
- Member Association: Manitoba (2012–2017; 2022–present); Saskatchewan (2017–2022)
- Brier: 8 (2018, 2020, 2021, 2022, 2023, 2024, 2025, 2026)
- World Championship: 1 (2026)
- Top CTRS ranking: 2nd (2024–25, 2025–26)
- Grand Slam victories: 3 (2019 Masters, 2025 Masters (Sept.), 2026 Masters)
Medal record
Men's curling
Representing Canada
World Championships
Silver medal – second place	2026 Ogden
World Junior Championships
Bronze medal – third place	2013 Sochi
Bronze medal – third place	2016 Copenhagen
Representing Saskatchewan
The Brier
Bronze medal – third place	2020 Kingston
Bronze medal – third place	2021 Calgary
Representing Manitoba
Canadian Olympic Curling Trials
Silver medal – second place	2025 Halifax
The Brier
Gold medal – first place	2026 St. John's
Silver medal – second place	2023 London
Silver medal – second place	2025 Kelowna

Matthew Dunstone (born June 25, 1995), nicknamed "the Sheriff", is a Canadian curler originally from Winnipeg, Manitoba. In 2026, he skipped his team to victory in the 2026 Montana's Brier, his first Canadian men's championship title. Dunstone also has three Grand Slam titles, winning the Masters in 2019, 2025 and 2026.

== Career ==
Dunstone started curling at a young age. He went to Linden Christian School, where he helped the school win the Manitoba High School Athletics Association curling title in 2010-11. Dunstone won the Canadian Junior Curling Championships in 2013. He represented Canada at the 2013 World Junior Curling Championships, where he won the bronze medal. He was unable to defend his championship at the 2014 Canadian Juniors after losing in the finals of the Manitoba Canola Juniors to Braden Calvert. The following year he once again lost to Calvert in the final. The next time he would represent Manitoba was in 2016, after winning the 2016 Manitoba Canola Juniors. This earned the Dunstone rink a spot in the 2016 Canadian Juniors where he won his second title after defeating Northern Ontario 11-4 in the final, and represented Canada at the 2016 World Junior Curling Championships, once again winning the bronze medal.

Dunstone joined the Saskatchewan-based Steve Laycock rink for the 2017-18 curling season, initially as second, but later in the season began throwing fourth stones, while Laycock skipped and threw third. Dunstone won his first provincial men's championship in 2018 with Team Laycock. The team represented Saskatchewan at the 2018 Tim Hortons Brier, where they finished with a 6-5 record.

Team Laycock broke up in 2018, and Dunstone formed a new Saskatchewan-based team, with him as skip, Braeden Moskowy at third, Catlin Schneider at second and Dustin Kidby at lead. The team was invited to represent Canada at the third leg of the 2018-19 Curling World Cup. The team won the event, defeating Team Sweden's Niklas Edin rink in the final.

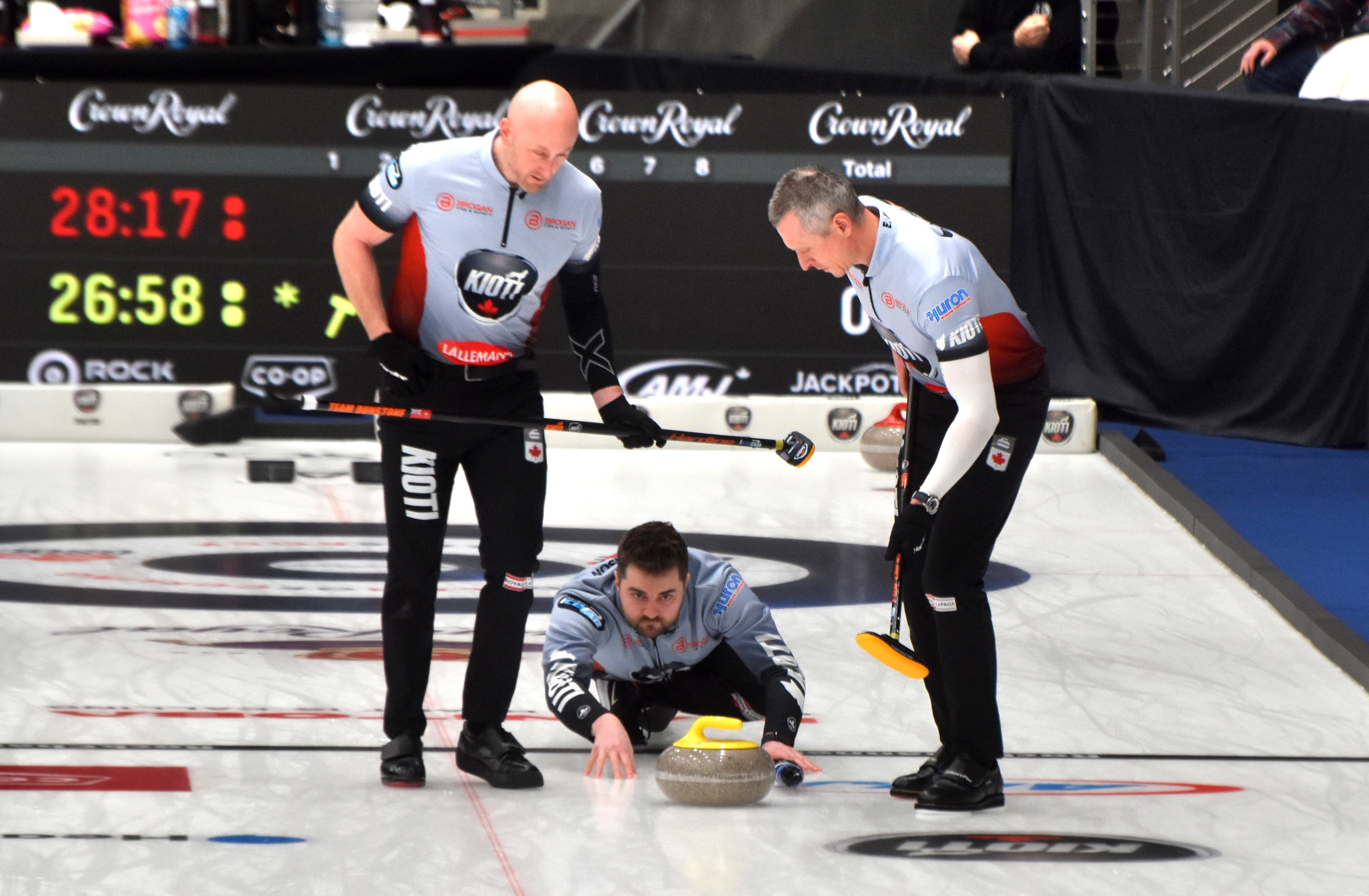
Matt Dunstone making a shot at the 2026 Players' Championship in Steinbach, Manitoba.

In their first event of the 2019-20 season, Team Dunstone finished runner-up at the Stu Sells Oakville Tankard to John Epping. Dunstone also won his first career Grand Slam at the 2019 Masters where he defeated Brad Gushue in the final. The team failed to replicate the success as they were not able to qualify at the Tour Challenge, National, Canadian Open, and finishing winless at the 2019 Canada Cup. The team was able to win the 2020 SaskTel Tankard, after falling into the C Event, Team Dunstone won four straight games including defeating Kirk Muyres in the final to win the provincial championship. At the 2020 Tim Hortons Brier, they finished the round robin and championship pool with a 8–3 record which qualified them for the 1 vs. 2 game against Alberta's Brendan Bottcher. They lost the game 9–4 and then lost the semifinal to Newfoundland and Labrador's Gushue, settling for a bronze medal. It would be the team's last event of the season as both the Players' Championship and the Champions Cup Grand Slam events were cancelled due to the COVID-19 pandemic. After the season, Team Dunstone added Kirk Muyres to their team, replacing Catlin Schneider at second.

Due to the COVID-19 pandemic in Saskatchewan, the 2021 provincial championship was cancelled. As the reigning provincial champions, Team Dunstone was invited to represent Saskatchewan at the 2021 Tim Hortons Brier, which they accepted. At the Brier, Dunstone led his team to a 9–3 record, qualifying for the playoffs as the second seed. Facing Brendan Bottcher in the semifinal, they lost 6–5 after Bottcher made a runback to score two in the tenth end. Team Dunstone would have to settle for the bronze medal for a second straight year.

Dunstone switched back to represent his home province of Manitoba with B. J. Neufeld as his third, Colton Lott as his second and Ryan Harnden as lead. In their first year together as a team they would finish second at the 2023 Tim Hortons Brier, losing the final to Brad Gushue. The following season, the team had another run at the playoffs at the Brier, but would lose in the playoffs to Mike McEwen. The team would make changes for the next season with Lott moving up to third and Harnden's brother E.J. Harnden joining with the team. The team would again make a run to the finals at the 2025 Montana's Brier. Dunstone beat Gushue in the 1v2 page playoff but would end up losing to Jacobs in the final 5-3.

The following year, the Dunstone team got off to a strong start, winning the 2025 Masters in September, and finishing as runner-up twice to Bruce Mouat in the 2025 Tour Challenge and 2025 GSOC Tahoe. Riding this wave of success, Dunstone was a favourite going into the 2025 Canadian Olympic Curling Trials. However, he would again suffer heartbreak losing three times to Brad Jacobs in the tournament. Dunstone would later say that "the two months we had after the trials, very difficult months for us. We had a really good reset. This was a major event that we wanted to perform at." After this disappointment Dunstone would fail to qualify for the playoffs of the next two Grand Slam events.

After this run of bad results, the Dunstone team wanted to finish the season off strong for the 2026 Montana's Brier, which would be E.J. Harnden's last event before retiring. The team finished second in their group, only losing to Kevin Koe. Dunstone would also curl two perfect games in round robin against the other Manitoba team led by Braden Calvert and Northern Ontario's Sandy MacEwan. The game against Northern Ontario was the first time ever that a third and skip had both curled a perfect game when he and Lott completed the task. Going into the playoffs Dunstone would again lose against Koe in the 1v2 game, but he would avenge his Olympic trials loss to Jacobs by beating him to get into the final. In his third match against Koe in the final, the Dunstone team would finally win their first national championship beating him 6-3. Dunstone later said that "we would have loved to have been the Olympic team, but this was next on our list. Given that this group isn't going to be together next year with E.J. retiring, this group owed it to ourselves to put our best foot forward and get a Brier championship."

== Personal life ==
Dunstone was a real estate student at the University of British Columbia, and currently works as a mortgage broker for Integra Mortgage. He is in a relationship with fellow curler Erin Pincott. Born and raised in Winnipeg, Manitoba, Dunstone officially moved to Kamloops, British Columbia to be with partner Pincott in 2018.

== Grand Slam record ==
Key
C	Champion
F	Lost in Final
SF	Lost in Semifinal
QF	Lost in Quarterfinals
R16	Lost in the round of 16
Q	Did not advance to playoffs
T2	Played in Tier 2 event
DNP	Did not participate in event
N/A	Not a Grand Slam event that season

Event	2015–16	2016–17	2017–18	2018–19	2019–20	2020–21	2021–22	2022–23	2023–24	2024–25	2025–26	2026–27
Invitational	DNP	DNP	QF	Q	Q	N/A	N/A	F	QF	SF	F	QF
Masters	DNP	DNP	Q	QF	C	N/A	Q	Q	QF	SF	C	C
National	DNP	DNP	DNP	DNP	Q	N/A	QF	SF	Q	Q	F	SF
Open	Q	DNP	Q	Q	Q	N/A	N/A	QF	QF	QF	Q	
Players'	Q	Q	DNP	Q	N/A	QF	Q	QF	Q	SF	Q	
Champions Cup	DNP	Q	QF	Q	N/A	Q	DNP	SF	N/A	N/A	N/A	N/A
Elite 10	Q	Q	DNP	DNP	N/A	N/A	N/A	N/A	N/A	N/A	N/A	N/A

== Teams ==
Season	Skip	Third	Second	Lead
2012–13	Matt Dunstone	Colton Lott	Daniel Grant	Brendan MacCuish
2013–14	Matt Dunstone	Colton Lott	Daniel Grant	Brendan MacCuish
2014–15	Matt Dunstone	Colton Lott	Kyle Doering	Rob Gordon
2015–16	Matt Dunstone	Colton Lott	Kyle Doering	Rob Gordon
2016–17	Matt Dunstone	Alex Forrest	Ian McMillan	Connor Njegovan
2017–18	Steve Laycock	Kirk Muyres	Matt Dunstone	Dallan Muyres
2017–18	Matt Dunstone (Fourth)	Steve Laycock (Skip)	Kirk Muyres	Dallan Muyres
2018–19	Matt Dunstone	Braeden Moskowy	Catlin Schneider	Dustin Kidby
2019–20	Matt Dunstone	Braeden Moskowy	Catlin Schneider	Dustin Kidby
2020–21	Matt Dunstone	Braeden Moskowy	Kirk Muyres	Dustin Kidby
2021–22	Matt Dunstone	Braeden Moskowy	Kirk Muyres	Dustin Kidby
2022–23	Matt Dunstone	B. J. Neufeld	Colton Lott	Ryan Harnden
2023–24	Matt Dunstone	B. J. Neufeld	Colton Lott	Ryan Harnden
2024–25 (Sept.–Oct.)	Matt Dunstone	B. J. Neufeld	Colton Lott	Ryan Harnden
2024–25 (Dec.–Apr.)	Matt Dunstone	Colton Lott	E. J. Harnden	Ryan Harnden
2025–26	Matt Dunstone	Colton Lott	E. J. Harnden	Ryan Harnden
2026–27	Matt Dunstone	Colton Lott	Mark Nichols	Ryan Harnden

== Awards ==
- Brier: First Team All-Star, Skip - 2023
