= 2024 Players' Championship =

Grand Slam of Curling event

2024 Princess Auto Players' Championship
- Host city: Toronto, Ontario
- Arena: Mattamy Athletic Centre
- Dates: April 9–14
- Men's winner: (Newfoundland and Labrador) Team Gushue
- Curling club: St. John's CC, St. John's
- Skip: Brad Gushue
- Third: Mark Nichols
- Second: E. J. Harnden
- Lead: Geoff Walker
- Coach: Caleb Flaxey
- Finalist: (Italy) Joël Retornaz
- Women's winner: (Switzerland) Team Tirinzoni
- Curling club: CC Aarau, Aarau
- Skip: Silvana Tirinzoni
- Fourth: Alina Pätz
- Second: Selina Witschonke
- Lead: Carole Howald
- Coach: Pierre Charette
- Finalist: (Sweden) Isabella Wranå

The 2024 Princess Auto Players' Championship was held from April 9 to 14 at the Mattamy Athletic Centre in Toronto, Ontario. It is the fifth and final Grand Slam event of the 2023–24 curling season.

Switzerland's Silvana Tirinzoni rink defeated Sweden's Isabella Wranå rink in the women's final, 6–5. It was a re-match of the 2023 Players' Championship final, in which Team Wranå was victorious. Team Tirinzoni opened up the scoring in the second end when last rock thrower Alina Pätz made a hit and stick for two. Wranå made a double in the third end to get a single, but nearly gave up a steal. Wranå missed a double in the fourth, and Pätz responded with a draw for two to take a 4–1 lead into the break. In the fifth, Wranå's last rock crashed on a guard, but rolled into the house, resulting in a score of two after a measurement. Wranå scored a steal of one in the sixth after Pätz missed a hit and roll, tying the game at four. In the seventh, Pätz made a bump of two Wranå stones that were close together, scoring two points in the process to take a 6–4 lead into the final frame. In the eighth, Wranå missed her last shot, scoring just a single point to lose the game. It was third straight Slam final for the Swiss team, after losing the previous two. It was the fourth career Slam title for Tirinzoni.

In the men's final, Newfoundland and Labrador's Brad Gushue won his 15th Grand Slam title after defeating the World #1 ranked Joël Retornaz team from Italy, 7–6. Team Gushue started the game off by getting forced to a single in the first after Gushue made a hit against two Retornaz rocks which sat across the rings. Retornaz scored a deuce in the second after making a hit on his last rock, which was followed by Gushue scoring a deuce of his own in the third after making a draw for two to take a 3–2 lead. Retornaz scored another deuce in the fourth after removing a Gushue stone off the button. Gushue scored another two in the next end with another draw, to take a 5–4 lead after five. In the sixth, Retornaz attempted to make a run double on his last, but missed, giving up a steal of one, to go down 6–4. In the seventh, with the team already sitting two, Retornaz attempted a raise on a guard to get a third point, but missed. The team still scored the two points, tying the game going into the last end. In the final end, Gushue missed a runback on his first shot, allowing Retornaz to draw to sit three to make things more difficult for Gushue. Gushue did not miss his last shot however, a draw to the back four which "pinballed" off of a Retornaz stone to come to a rest, winning the game.

== Qualification ==
The top 12 ranked men's and women's teams on World Curling's Year-to-Date rankings as of March 11, 2024 qualified for the event. In the event that a team declines their invitation, the next-ranked team on the world team ranking is invited until the field is complete.

=== Men ===
Top Year-to-Date men's teams:

1. (Italy) Joël Retornaz
2. (Alberta) Brendan Bottcher
3. (Scotland) Bruce Mouat
4. (Scotland) Ross Whyte
5. (Switzerland) Yannick Schwaller
6. (Newfoundland and Labrador) Brad Gushue
7. (Sweden) Niklas Edin
8. (Manitoba) Matt Dunstone
9. (Saskatchewan) Mike McEwen
10. (Alberta) Kevin Koe
11. (Manitoba) Brad Jacobs
12. (Scotland) James Craik

=== Women ===
Top Year-to-Date women's teams:

1. (Ontario) Rachel Homan
2. (Switzerland) Silvana Tirinzoni
3. (South Korea) Gim Eun-ji
4. (Manitoba) Jennifer Jones
5. (Sweden) Anna Hasselborg
6. (South Korea) Kim Eun-jung
7. (Manitoba) Kerri Einarson
8. (Sweden) Isabella Wranå
9. (Italy) Stefania Constantini
10. (Manitoba) Kaitlyn Lawes
11. (Switzerland) Xenia Schwaller
12. (Japan) Satsuki Fujisawa

== Men ==
=== Teams ===
The teams are listed as follows:

Skip	Third	Second	Lead	Locale
Brendan Bottcher	Marc Kennedy	Brett Gallant	Ben Hebert	Calgary, Alberta
James Craik	Mark Watt	Angus Bryce	Blair Haswell	Forfar, Scotland
Matt Dunstone	B. J. Neufeld	Colton Lott	Ryan Harnden	Winnipeg, Manitoba
Niklas Edin	Oskar Eriksson	Rasmus Wranå	Christoffer Sundgren	Karlstad, Sweden
Brad Gushue	Mark Nichols	E. J. Harnden	Geoff Walker	St. John's, Newfoundland and Labrador
Brad Jacobs	Reid Carruthers	Scott Howard (Note: Scott Howard spared for Derek Samagalski who was on paternity leave.)	Connor Njegovan	Winnipeg, Manitoba
Kevin Koe	Tyler Tardi	Jacques Gauthier	Karrick Martin	Calgary, Alberta
Mike McEwen	Colton Flasch	Kevin Marsh	Dan Marsh	Saskatoon, Saskatchewan
Bruce Mouat	Grant Hardie	Bobby Lammie	Hammy McMillan Jr.	Stirling, Scotland
Joël Retornaz	Amos Mosaner	Sebastiano Arman	Mattia Giovanella	Trentino, Italy
Benoît Schwarz-van Berkel (Fourth)	Yannick Schwaller (Skip)	Sven Michel	Pablo Lachat	Geneva, Switzerland
Ross Whyte	Robin Brydone	Duncan McFadzean	Craig Waddell (Note: Craig Waddell spared for Euan Kyle who was recovering from an injury.)	Stirling, Scotland

=== Round robin standings ===
Final Round Robin Standings

Key
Teams to Playoffs

Pool A	W	L	PF	PA	SO
(Saskatchewan) Mike McEwen	4	1	33	23	7
(Scotland) Ross Whyte	3	2	28	22	11
(Italy) Joël Retornaz	3	2	33	30	12
(Switzerland) Yannick Schwaller	2	3	27	28	3
(Manitoba) Matt Dunstone	2	3	24	26	5
(Scotland) James Craik	1	4	18	34	2

Pool B	W	L	PF	PA	SO
(Scotland) Bruce Mouat	4	1	32	22	8
(Sweden) Niklas Edin	3	2	26	21	6
(Newfoundland and Labrador) Brad Gushue	3	2	27	27	9
(Manitoba) Brad Jacobs	2	3	18	30	4
(Alberta) Brendan Bottcher	2	3	26	24	1
(Alberta) Kevin Koe	1	4	21	26	10

=== Round robin results ===
All draw times are listed in Eastern Time (UTC−04:00).

==== Draw 1 ====
Tuesday, April 9, 11:30 am

Sheet A	1	2	3	4	5	6	7	8	Final
(Scotland) Ross Whyte	0	0	0	3	1	2	X	X	6
(Scotland) James Craik 🔨	0	1	0	0	0	0	X	X	1

Sheet C	1	2	3	4	5	6	7	8	Final
(Scotland) Bruce Mouat 🔨	0	0	2	4	3	X	X	X	9
(Manitoba) Brad Jacobs	0	0	0	0	0	X	X	X	0

==== Draw 2 ====
Tuesday, April 9, 3:00 pm

Sheet A	1	2	3	4	5	6	7	8	9	Final
(Switzerland) Yannick Schwaller 🔨	1	1	0	1	0	0	1	0	2	6
(Manitoba) Matt Dunstone	0	0	3	0	0	0	0	1	0	4

Sheet C	1	2	3	4	5	6	7	8	Final
(Alberta) Brendan Bottcher 🔨	2	0	0	0	0	1	0	X	3
(Alberta) Kevin Koe	0	0	2	1	0	0	3	X	6

==== Draw 3 ====
Tuesday, April 9, 6:30 pm

Sheet A	1	2	3	4	5	6	7	8	Final
(Italy) Joël Retornaz	0	0	3	0	1	0	3	0	7
(Saskatchewan) Mike McEwen 🔨	0	1	0	3	0	2	0	3	9

Sheet C	1	2	3	4	5	6	7	8	Final
(Newfoundland and Labrador) Brad Gushue 🔨	0	0	3	0	3	0	0	X	6
(Sweden) Niklas Edin	1	1	0	2	0	0	1	X	5

==== Draw 4 ====
Wednesday, April 10, 8:00 am

Sheet A	1	2	3	4	5	6	7	8	Final
(Alberta) Kevin Koe	0	2	0	0	1	0	2	0	5
(Manitoba) Brad Jacobs 🔨	1	0	1	0	0	2	0	2	6

Sheet C	1	2	3	4	5	6	7	8	9	Final
(Switzerland) Yannick Schwaller	0	3	0	0	1	0	0	2	0	6
(Scotland) James Craik 🔨	1	0	2	1	0	0	2	0	1	7

==== Draw 5 ====
Wednesday, April 10, 11:30 am

Sheet A	1	2	3	4	5	6	7	8	Final
(Scotland) Bruce Mouat 🔨	0	2	0	1	0	1	0	4	8
(Newfoundland and Labrador) Brad Gushue	1	0	1	0	1	0	2	0	5

Sheet C	1	2	3	4	5	6	7	8	Final
(Italy) Joël Retornaz	0	1	0	2	0	1	X	X	4
(Manitoba) Matt Dunstone 🔨	4	0	2	0	1	0	X	X	7

==== Draw 6 ====
Wednesday, April 10, 3:30 pm

Sheet A	1	2	3	4	5	6	7	8	Final
(Alberta) Brendan Bottcher 🔨	0	0	0	1	1	0	0	X	2
(Sweden) Niklas Edin	0	0	1	0	0	3	3	X	7

Sheet C	1	2	3	4	5	6	7	8	Final
(Scotland) Ross Whyte	0	0	0	1	0	0	0	X	1
(Saskatchewan) Mike McEwen 🔨	2	0	1	0	1	1	1	X	6

==== Draw 7 ====
Wednesday, April 10, 7:30 pm

Sheet B	1	2	3	4	5	6	7	8	Final
(Newfoundland and Labrador) Brad Gushue	0	3	0	1	0	3	0	1	8
(Manitoba) Brad Jacobs 🔨	2	0	1	0	1	0	1	0	5

Sheet D	1	2	3	4	5	6	7	8	Final
(Italy) Joël Retornaz	0	0	2	0	1	2	1	X	6
(Switzerland) Yannick Schwaller 🔨	0	2	0	1	0	0	0	X	3

==== Draw 8 ====
Thursday, April 11, 8:30 am

Sheet A	1	2	3	4	5	6	7	8	Final
(Scotland) Ross Whyte 🔨	2	3	0	2	0	X	X	X	7
(Manitoba) Matt Dunstone	0	0	0	0	2	X	X	X	2

Sheet C	1	2	3	4	5	6	7	8	Final
(Alberta) Brendan Bottcher 🔨	3	0	2	0	3	X	X	X	8
(Scotland) Bruce Mouat	0	2	0	1	0	X	X	X	3

==== Draw 9 ====
Thursday, April 11, 11:30 am

Sheet B	1	2	3	4	5	6	7	8	Final
(Italy) Joël Retornaz 🔨	2	0	0	1	2	0	3	X	8
(Scotland) James Craik	0	2	0	0	0	2	0	X	4

Sheet D	1	2	3	4	5	6	7	8	Final
(Newfoundland and Labrador) Brad Gushue 🔨	2	1	2	1	0	X	X	X	6
(Alberta) Kevin Koe	0	0	0	0	1	X	X	X	1

==== Draw 10 ====
Thursday, April 11, 3:30 pm

Sheet B	1	2	3	4	5	6	7	8	9	Final
(Manitoba) Matt Dunstone 🔨	0	1	0	0	2	0	0	2	0	5
(Saskatchewan) Mike McEwen	0	0	2	0	0	2	1	0	1	6

Sheet D	1	2	3	4	5	6	7	8	Final
(Scotland) Bruce Mouat	0	2	0	4	0	1	0	X	7
(Sweden) Niklas Edin 🔨	1	0	2	0	1	0	1	X	5

==== Draw 11 ====
Thursday, April 11, 7:30 pm

Sheet B	1	2	3	4	5	6	7	8	Final
(Scotland) Ross Whyte	0	4	0	0	1	0	2	X	7
(Switzerland) Yannick Schwaller 🔨	2	0	1	1	0	1	0	X	5

Sheet D	1	2	3	4	5	6	7	8	9	Final
(Alberta) Brendan Bottcher	0	0	3	0	1	0	0	1	0	5
(Manitoba) Brad Jacobs 🔨	0	2	0	2	0	1	0	0	1	6

==== Draw 12 ====
Friday, April 12, 7:30 am

Sheet A	1	2	3	4	5	6	7	8	Final
(Saskatchewan) Mike McEwen	0	2	2	1	0	0	3	X	8
(Scotland) James Craik 🔨	2	0	0	0	0	1	0	X	3

Sheet C	1	2	3	4	5	6	7	8	Final
(Sweden) Niklas Edin 🔨	0	0	1	1	0	2	0	2	6
(Alberta) Kevin Koe	1	0	0	0	2	0	2	0	5

==== Draw 13 ====
Friday, April 12, 11:00 am

Sheet B	1	2	3	4	5	6	7	8	Final
(Alberta) Brendan Bottcher 🔨	4	0	3	0	1	X	X	X	8
(Newfoundland and Labrador) Brad Gushue	0	1	0	1	0	X	X	X	2

Sheet D	1	2	3	4	5	6	7	8	Final
(Italy) Joël Retornaz 🔨	4	0	0	1	0	2	0	1	8
(Scotland) Ross Whyte	0	2	1	0	3	0	1	0	7

==== Draw 14 ====
Friday, April 12, 3:00 pm

Sheet B	1	2	3	4	5	6	7	8	Final
(Scotland) Bruce Mouat 🔨	0	0	1	1	0	0	0	3	5
(Alberta) Kevin Koe	1	0	0	0	0	2	1	0	4

Sheet D	1	2	3	4	5	6	7	8	Final
(Manitoba) Matt Dunstone 🔨	0	2	0	2	1	0	1	X	6
(Scotland) James Craik	1	0	1	0	0	1	0	X	3

==== Draw 15 ====
Friday, April 12, 7:00 pm

Sheet B	1	2	3	4	5	6	7	8	Final
(Sweden) Niklas Edin 🔨	1	1	0	1	0	0	0	X	3
(Manitoba) Brad Jacobs	0	0	0	0	1	0	0	X	1

Sheet D	1	2	3	4	5	6	7	8	Final
(Switzerland) Yannick Schwaller 🔨	2	0	0	1	0	1	0	3	7
(Saskatchewan) Mike McEwen	0	1	0	0	1	0	2	0	4

=== Playoffs ===
Quarterfinals
4	(Newfoundland and Labrador) Brad Gushue	6
5	(Scotland) Ross Whyte	5
3	(Sweden) Niklas Edin	2
6	(Italy) Joël Retornaz	7

Semifinals
1	(Saskatchewan) Mike McEwen	5
6	(Italy) Joël Retornaz	6
2	(Scotland) Bruce Mouat	5
4	(Newfoundland and Labrador) Brad Gushue	6

Final
6	(Italy) Joël Retornaz	6
4	(Newfoundland and Labrador) Brad Gushue	7

==== Quarterfinals ====
Saturday, April 13, 3:30 pm

Sheet A	1	2	3	4	5	6	7	8	Final
(Sweden) Niklas Edin	0	1	0	0	1	0	0	X	2
(Italy) Joël Retornaz 🔨	2	0	1	1	0	2	1	X	7

Player percentages
(Sweden) Team Edin		(Italy) Team Retornaz	
Christoffer Sundgren	93%	Mattia Giovanella	100%
Rasmus Wranå	75%	Sebastiano Arman	86%
Oskar Eriksson	80%	Amos Mosaner	88%
Niklas Edin	66%	Joël Retornaz	70%
Total	79%	Total	86%

Sheet C	1	2	3	4	5	6	7	8	Final
(Newfoundland and Labrador) Brad Gushue	0	1	0	2	0	2	0	1	6
(Scotland) Ross Whyte 🔨	2	0	1	0	1	0	1	0	5

Player percentages
(Newfoundland and Labrador) Team Gushue		(Scotland) Team Whyte	
Geoff Walker	91%	Craig Waddell	97%
E. J. Harnden	81%	Duncan McFadzean	86%
Mark Nichols	81%	Robin Brydone	83%
Brad Gushue	91%	Ross Whyte	75%
Total	86%	Total	85%

==== Semifinals ====
Saturday, April 13, 7:30 pm

Sheet A	1	2	3	4	5	6	7	8	Final
(Scotland) Bruce Mouat 🔨	1	2	0	0	1	0	1	0	5
(Newfoundland and Labrador) Brad Gushue	0	0	3	0	0	2	0	1	6

Player percentages
(Scotland) Team Mouat		(Newfoundland and Labrador) Team Gushue	
Hammy McMillan Jr.	92%	Geoff Walker	88%
Bobby Lammie	83%	E. J. Harnden	80%
Grant Hardie	78%	Mark Nichols	94%
Bruce Mouat	64%	Brad Gushue	85%
Total	79%	Total	87%

Sheet C	1	2	3	4	5	6	7	8	Final
(Saskatchewan) Mike McEwen 🔨	0	0	2	0	0	0	3	0	5
(Italy) Joël Retornaz	0	0	0	2	0	1	0	3	6

Player percentages
(Saskatchewan) Team McEwen		(Italy) Team Retornaz	
Dan Marsh	94%	Mattia Giovanella	98%
Kevin Marsh	89%	Sebastiano Arman	80%
Colton Flasch	86%	Amos Mosaner	78%
Mike McEwen	67%	Joël Retornaz	72%
Total	84%	Total	82%

==== Final ====
Sunday, April 14, 2:30 pm

Sheet B	1	2	3	4	5	6	7	8	Final
(Italy) Joël Retornaz	0	2	0	2	0	0	2	0	6
(Newfoundland and Labrador) Brad Gushue 🔨	1	0	2	0	2	1	0	1	7

Player percentages
(Italy) Team Retornaz		(Newfoundland and Labrador) Team Gushue	
Mattia Giovanella	94%	Geoff Walker	88%
Sebastiano Arman	77%	E. J. Harnden	86%
Amos Mosaner	89%	Mark Nichols	72%
Joël Retornaz	61%	Brad Gushue	84%
Total	80%	Total	82%

== Women ==
=== Teams ===
The teams are listed as follows:

Skip	Third	Second	Lead	Alternate	Locale
Stefania Constantini	Elena Mathis	Angela Romei	Giulia Zardini Lacedelli	Marta Lo Deserto	Cortina d'Ampezzo, Italy
Kerri Einarson	Val Sweeting	Shannon Birchard	Krysten Karwacki (Note: Krysten Karwacki replaced Briane Harris.)		Gimli, Manitoba
Satsuki Fujisawa	Chinami Yoshida	Yumi Suzuki	Yurika Yoshida	Kotomi Ishizaki	Kitami, Japan
Gim Eun-ji	Kim Min-ji	Kim Su-ji	Seol Ye-eun	Seol Ye-ji	Uijeongbu, South Korea
Anna Hasselborg	Sara McManus	Agnes Knochenhauer	Sofia Mabergs		Sundbyberg, Sweden
Rachel Homan	Tracy Fleury	Emma Miskew	Sarah Wilkes		Ottawa, Ontario
Jennifer Jones	Karlee Burgess	Emily Zacharias	Lauren Lenentine		Winnipeg, Manitoba
Kim Eun-jung	Kim Kyeong-ae	Kim Cho-hi	Kim Seon-yeong	Kim Yeong-mi	Gangneung, South Korea
Kaitlyn Lawes	Selena Njegovan	Jocelyn Peterman	Kristin MacCuish		Winnipeg, Manitoba
Xenia Schwaller	Selina Gafner	Fabienne Rieder	Selina Rychiger	Marion Wüest	Zurich, Switzerland
Alina Pätz (Fourth)	Silvana Tirinzoni (Skip)	Selina Witschonke	Carole Howald		Aarau, Switzerland
Isabella Wranå	Almida de Val	Maria Larsson	Linda Stenlund		Sundbyberg, Sweden

=== Round robin standings ===
Final Round Robin Standings

Key
Teams to Playoffs

Pool A	W	L	PF	PA	SO
(Ontario) Rachel Homan	5	0	35	14	4
(Sweden) Isabella Wranå	4	1	34	23	1
(Sweden) Anna Hasselborg	3	2	26	30	12
(Manitoba) Jennifer Jones	1	4	23	38	5
(Japan) Satsuki Fujisawa	1	4	27	32	6
(Italy) Stefania Constantini	1	4	22	30	9

Pool B	W	L	PF	PA	SO
(South Korea) Gim Eun-ji	4	1	30	32	3
(Switzerland) Silvana Tirinzoni	4	1	36	24	7
(South Korea) Kim Eun-jung	3	2	26	20	10
(Manitoba) Kerri Einarson	2	3	24	29	2
(Manitoba) Kaitlyn Lawes	1	4	25	30	11
(Switzerland) Xenia Schwaller	1	4	21	27	8

=== Round robin results ===
All draw times are listed in Eastern Time (UTC−04:00).

==== Draw 1 ====
Tuesday, April 9, 11:30 am

Sheet B	1	2	3	4	5	6	7	8	Final
(Manitoba) Jennifer Jones 🔨	2	0	0	0	0	0	X	X	2
(Sweden) Isabella Wranå	0	2	1	0	2	4	X	X	9

Sheet D	1	2	3	4	5	6	7	8	Final
(South Korea) Kim Eun-jung 🔨	0	0	0	1	0	1	0	2	4
(Switzerland) Xenia Schwaller	1	0	0	0	1	0	1	0	3

==== Draw 2 ====
Tuesday, April 9, 3:00 pm

Sheet B	1	2	3	4	5	6	7	8	Final
(Ontario) Rachel Homan	1	1	0	1	1	3	X	X	7
(Italy) Stefania Constantini 🔨	0	0	1	0	0	0	X	X	1

Sheet D	1	2	3	4	5	6	7	8	9	Final
(South Korea) Gim Eun-ji 🔨	0	0	1	0	2	0	0	1	1	5
(Manitoba) Kerri Einarson	0	1	0	2	0	0	1	0	0	4

==== Draw 3 ====
Tuesday, April 9, 6:30 pm

Sheet B	1	2	3	4	5	6	7	8	Final
(Sweden) Anna Hasselborg	0	0	2	0	2	0	0	2	6
(Japan) Satsuki Fujisawa 🔨	1	0	0	2	0	0	2	0	5

Sheet D	1	2	3	4	5	6	7	8	Final
(Switzerland) Silvana Tirinzoni	0	1	0	2	0	1	3	X	7
(Manitoba) Kaitlyn Lawes 🔨	2	0	0	0	1	0	0	X	3

==== Draw 4 ====
Wednesday, April 10, 8:00 am

Sheet B	1	2	3	4	5	6	7	8	Final
(Manitoba) Kerri Einarson	0	1	0	1	0	2	0	X	4
(Switzerland) Xenia Schwaller 🔨	0	0	1	0	4	0	1	X	6

Sheet D	1	2	3	4	5	6	7	8	Final
(Manitoba) Jennifer Jones 🔨	3	0	0	2	0	0	1	2	8
(Italy) Stefania Constantini	0	1	1	0	2	1	0	0	5

==== Draw 5 ====
Wednesday, April 10, 11:30 am

Sheet B	1	2	3	4	5	6	7	8	Final
(Switzerland) Silvana Tirinzoni 🔨	0	2	0	1	0	3	0	X	6
(South Korea) Kim Eun-jung	0	0	1	0	1	0	2	X	4

Sheet D	1	2	3	4	5	6	7	8	Final
(Sweden) Isabella Wranå 🔨	1	1	0	1	1	0	2	2	8
(Japan) Satsuki Fujisawa	0	0	2	0	0	1	0	0	3

==== Draw 6 ====
Wednesday, April 10, 3:30 pm

Sheet B	1	2	3	4	5	6	7	8	Final
(South Korea) Gim Eun-ji 🔨	1	2	0	2	3	0	0	0	8
(Manitoba) Kaitlyn Lawes	0	0	2	0	0	2	1	2	7

Sheet D	1	2	3	4	5	6	7	8	Final
(Ontario) Rachel Homan 🔨	3	1	0	3	X	X	X	X	7
(Sweden) Anna Hasselborg	0	0	1	0	X	X	X	X	1

==== Draw 7 ====
Wednesday, April 10, 7:30 pm

Sheet A	1	2	3	4	5	6	7	8	Final
(Manitoba) Jennifer Jones	0	2	0	1	1	0	0	0	4
(Japan) Satsuki Fujisawa 🔨	2	0	1	0	0	2	1	3	9

Sheet C	1	2	3	4	5	6	7	8	Final
(Switzerland) Silvana Tirinzoni 🔨	1	0	0	2	0	3	1	X	7
(Switzerland) Xenia Schwaller	0	1	0	0	2	0	0	X	3

==== Draw 8 ====
Thursday, April 11, 8:30 am

Sheet B	1	2	3	4	5	6	7	8	Final
(Ontario) Rachel Homan 🔨	3	0	1	0	1	1	1	X	7
(Sweden) Isabella Wranå	0	1	0	3	0	0	0	X	4

Sheet D	1	2	3	4	5	6	7	8	Final
(South Korea) Gim Eun-ji	0	1	0	0	0	X	X	X	1
(South Korea) Kim Eun-jung 🔨	2	0	2	3	1	X	X	X	8

==== Draw 9 ====
Thursday, April 11, 11:30 am

Sheet A	1	2	3	4	5	6	7	8	Final
(Switzerland) Silvana Tirinzoni 🔨	1	0	4	0	2	0	X	X	7
(Manitoba) Kerri Einarson	0	1	0	1	0	1	X	X	3

Sheet C	1	2	3	4	5	6	7	8	Final
(Japan) Satsuki Fujisawa	0	0	2	0	0	2	1	0	5
(Italy) Stefania Constantini 🔨	0	2	0	2	2	0	0	2	8

==== Draw 10 ====
Thursday, April 11, 3:30 pm

Sheet A	1	2	3	4	5	6	7	8	Final
(South Korea) Kim Eun-jung 🔨	0	1	1	0	0	1	0	1	4
(Manitoba) Kaitlyn Lawes	1	0	0	1	1	0	0	0	3

Sheet C	1	2	3	4	5	6	7	8	Final
(Sweden) Anna Hasselborg	0	3	0	2	0	1	1	0	7
(Sweden) Isabella Wranå 🔨	2	0	2	0	3	0	0	1	8

==== Draw 11 ====
Thursday, April 11, 7:30 pm

Sheet A	1	2	3	4	5	6	7	8	Final
(South Korea) Gim Eun-ji 🔨	0	1	0	0	0	2	0	2	5
(Switzerland) Xenia Schwaller	1	0	0	1	1	0	1	0	4

Sheet C	1	2	3	4	5	6	7	8	Final
(Ontario) Rachel Homan 🔨	1	1	0	1	2	0	3	X	8
(Manitoba) Jennifer Jones	0	0	2	0	0	1	0	X	3

==== Draw 12 ====
Friday, April 12, 7:30 am

Sheet B	1	2	3	4	5	6	7	8	Final
(Manitoba) Kerri Einarson	0	0	2	0	0	2	0	2	6
(Manitoba) Kaitlyn Lawes 🔨	1	1	0	1	0	0	2	0	5

Sheet D	1	2	3	4	5	6	7	8	Final
(Sweden) Anna Hasselborg 🔨	3	0	0	1	0	1	0	0	5
(Italy) Stefania Constantini	0	1	1	0	0	0	1	1	4

==== Draw 13 ====
Friday, April 12, 11:00 am

Sheet A	1	2	3	4	5	6	7	8	9	Final
(Ontario) Rachel Homan 🔨	0	2	0	1	0	0	2	0	1	6
(Japan) Satsuki Fujisawa	0	0	1	0	0	3	0	1	0	5

Sheet C	1	2	3	4	5	6	7	8	Final
(Switzerland) Silvana Tirinzoni	0	2	0	3	0	3	1	0	9
(South Korea) Gim Eun-ji 🔨	1	0	3	0	4	0	0	3	11

==== Draw 14 ====
Friday, April 12, 3:00 pm

Sheet A	1	2	3	4	5	6	7	8	Final
(Sweden) Isabella Wranå 🔨	0	2	1	0	1	1	0	0	5
(Italy) Stefania Constantini	0	0	0	1	0	0	2	1	4

Sheet C	1	2	3	4	5	6	7	8	9	Final
(South Korea) Kim Eun-jung	0	2	0	2	1	0	0	1	0	6
(Manitoba) Kerri Einarson 🔨	2	0	2	0	0	1	1	0	1	7

==== Draw 15 ====
Friday, April 12, 7:00 pm

Sheet A	1	2	3	4	5	6	7	8	Final
(Manitoba) Jennifer Jones 🔨	1	0	2	0	1	0	2	0	6
(Sweden) Anna Hasselborg	0	1	0	2	0	3	0	1	7

Sheet C	1	2	3	4	5	6	7	8	Final
(Manitoba) Kaitlyn Lawes	1	0	2	2	2	0	0	X	7
(Switzerland) Xenia Schwaller 🔨	0	2	0	0	0	2	1	X	5

=== Playoffs ===
Quarterfinals
4	(Switzerland) Silvana Tirinzoni	6
5	(South Korea) Kim Eun-jung	3
3	(South Korea) Gim Eun-ji	8
6	(Sweden) Anna Hasselborg	7

Semifinals
1	(Ontario) Rachel Homan	3
4	(Switzerland) Silvana Tirinzoni	5
2	(Sweden) Isabella Wranå	6
3	(South Korea) Gim Eun-ji	5

Final
4	(Switzerland) Silvana Tirinzoni	6
2	(Sweden) Isabella Wranå	5

==== Quarterfinals ====
Saturday, April 13, 11:30 am

Sheet B	1	2	3	4	5	6	7	8	Final
(Switzerland) Silvana Tirinzoni 🔨	2	1	0	1	0	1	1	X	6
(South Korea) Kim Eun-jung	0	0	2	0	1	0	0	X	3

Player percentages
(Switzerland) Team Tirinzoni		(South Korea) Team Kim	
Carole Howald	84%	Kim Seon-yeong	92%
Selina Witschonke	70%	Kim Cho-hi	72%
Silvana Tirinzoni	83%	Kim Kyeong-ae	73%
Alina Pätz	86%	Kim Eun-jung	72%
Total	81%	Total	77%

Sheet D	1	2	3	4	5	6	7	8	9	Final
(South Korea) Gim Eun-ji 🔨	4	0	1	0	2	0	0	0	1	8
(Sweden) Anna Hasselborg	0	2	0	2	0	1	1	1	0	7

Player percentages
(South Korea) Team Gim		(Sweden) Team Hasselborg	
Seol Ye-eun	88%	Sofia Mabergs	93%
Kim Su-ji	92%	Agnes Knochenhauer	82%
Kim Min-ji	85%	Sara McManus	93%
Gim Eun-ji	69%	Anna Hasselborg	67%
Total	83%	Total	84%

==== Semifinals ====
Saturday, April 13, 7:30 pm

Sheet B	1	2	3	4	5	6	7	8	Final
(Sweden) Isabella Wranå 🔨	0	1	1	0	2	0	1	1	6
(South Korea) Gim Eun-ji	1	0	0	2	0	2	0	0	5

Player percentages
(Sweden) Team Wranå		(South Korea) Team Gim	
Linda Stenlund	88%	Seol Ye-eun	83%
Maria Larsson	84%	Kim Su-ji	78%
Almida de Val	81%	Kim Min-ji	78%
Isabella Wranå	64%	Gim Eun-ji	63%
Total	79%	Total	75%

Sheet D	1	2	3	4	5	6	7	8	Final
(Ontario) Rachel Homan 🔨	1	0	0	0	2	0	0	0	3
(Switzerland) Silvana Tirinzoni	0	1	1	0	0	0	1	2	5

Player percentages
(Ontario) Team Homan		(Switzerland) Team Tirinzoni	
Sarah Wilkes	91%	Carole Howald	88%
Emma Miskew	94%	Selina Witschonke	86%
Tracy Fleury	91%	Silvana Tirinzoni	83%
Rachel Homan	72%	Alina Pätz	84%
Total	87%	Total	85%

==== Final ====
Sunday, April 14, 10:00 am

Sheet B	1	2	3	4	5	6	7	8	Final
(Switzerland) Silvana Tirinzoni 🔨	0	2	0	2	0	0	2	0	6
(Sweden) Isabella Wranå	0	0	1	0	2	1	0	1	5

Player percentages
(Switzerland) Team Tirinzoni		(Sweden) Team Wranå	
Carole Howald	80%	Linda Stenlund	95%
Selina Witschonke	70%	Maria Larsson	84%
Silvana Tirinzoni	77%	Almida de Val	78%
Alina Pätz	80%	Isabella Wranå	67%
Total	77%	Total	81%
