= Isabella Wranå =

Swedish curler (born 1997)

- Curler
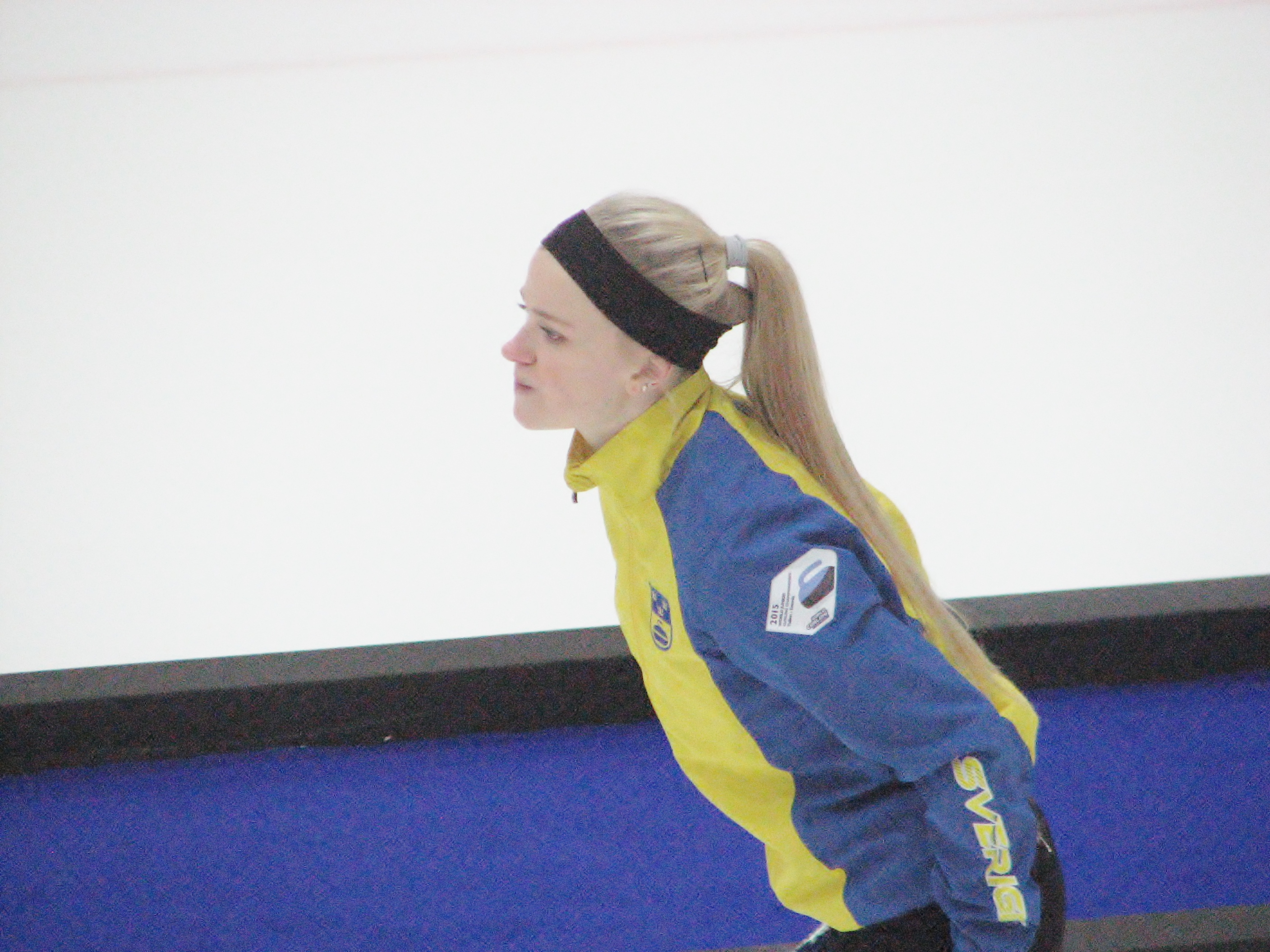
- Wranå at the 2015 World Junior Curling Championships
- Born: 22 June 1997 (age 29); Stockholm, Sweden

Team
- Curling club: Sundbybergs CK, Sundbyberg
- Skip: Isabella Wranå
- Third: Almida de Val
- Second: Moa Dryburgh
- Lead: Maria Larsson
- Alternate: Linda Stenlund
- Mixed doubles partner: Rasmus Wranå

Curling career
- Member Association: Sweden
- World Championship: 1 (2026)
- World Mixed Doubles Championship: 2 (2022, 2024)
- European Championship: 2 (2023, 2026)
- Olympic: 1 (2026)
- Grand Slam victories: 2 (2023 Players', 2026 Masters)
Medal record
Curling
Representing Sweden
Olympic Games
Gold medal – first place	2026 Milano Cortina	Mixed doubles
World Championships
Bronze medal – third place	2026 Calgary
World Mixed Doubles Championships
Gold medal – first place	2024 Östersund
European Curling Championships
Gold medal – first place	2026 Ostrava
World Junior Curling Championships
Gold medal – first place	2017 Gangneung
Silver medal – second place	2018 Aberdeen
Winter Universiade
Gold medal – first place	2019 Krasnoyarsk
Bronze medal – third place	2017 Almaty
European Mixed Curling Championships
Gold medal – first place	2014 Copenhagen
Swedish Women's Championships
Gold medal – first place	2018 Skellefteå
Gold medal – first place	2022 Härnösand
Silver medal – second place	2016 Piteå
Silver medal – second place	2019 Jönköping
Silver medal – second place	2023 Karlstad
Silver medal – second place	2024 Jönköping
Bronze medal – third place	2020 Jönköping

Isabella Marianne Peggy Wranå (born 22 June 1997) is a Swedish curler. She is a former skip of the Swedish junior women's team, with whom she won the 2017 World Junior Curling Championships. In 2018, she was inducted into the Swedish Curling Hall of Fame. Competing alongside her older brother Rasmus, she won the gold medal in the mixed doubles curling final at the 2026 Winter Olympics.

Wranå was born in Vällingby, in Stockholm Municipality.

== Career ==
=== Juniors ===
Wranå has skipped the Swedish team in four World Junior Curling Championships, in 2014, 2015, 2017 and 2018. In 2014, she led her team of Jennie Wåhlin, Elin Lövstrand, Fanny Sjöberg and Almida de Val to a fourth-place finish, after they lost in the bronze medal game to Russia. In 2015, she and teammates Wåhlin, Johanna Heldin, Sjöberg and Johanna Höglund again finished fourth after this time losing to Switzerland in the bronze medal game. She was back at it in 2017 when her and teammates Wåhlin, de Val and Sjöberg won the gold medal, defeating Scotland's Sophie Jackson in the final, and lost just two round robin games in the process. The next year the same team went undefeated in the round robin, but ended up losing to Canada's Kaitlyn Jones in the final. This team also represented Sweden at the 2017 Winter Universiade, where they took home the bronze medal.

=== Women's ===
As World Junior champions, Wranå qualified for the 2017 Humpty's Champions Cup, her first Grand Slam event. The team did not qualify for the playoffs but did win one game. The team won their first World Curling Tour event at the 2018 AMJ Campbell Shorty Jenkins Classic. A month later, they won the Paf Masters Tour. Over the course of the 2018–19 season, Wranå's team played in four slams, failing to qualify in any of the four. They won one game at the 2018 Tour Challenge, one game at the 2018 National, no games at the 2019 Canadian Open and one game at the 2019 Champions Cup. Also during this season, Wranå skipped her team to a gold medal at the 2019 Winter Universiade.

Team Wranå had a successful 2019–20 season, winning two tour events (the Royal LePage Women's Fall Classic and the Paf Masters Tour once again) and finishing second at the Women's Masters Basel and the Glynhill Ladies International. They played in two slam events, winning one game at both the 2019 Tour Challenge and the 2019 National.

Due to the COVID-19 pandemic, Team Wranå only played in one tour event during the abbreviated 2020–21 season. The team competed at the 2020 Women's Masters Basel, where they missed the playoffs with a 1–2 record. In December, they played Team Hasselborg in the Sweden National Challenge, where they won by a score of 17–12. The Swedish Women's Curling Championship was cancelled due to the pandemic, so Team Hasselborg was named as the Swedish Team for the 2021 World Women's Curling Championship. After the season, longtime lead Fanny Sjöberg stepped back from competitive curling and Maria Larsson joined the team as their new lead.

In their first event of the 2021–22 season, Team Wranå reached the final of the 2021 Euro Super Series where they lost to Rebecca Morrison. They also reached the semifinals of the 2021 Women's Masters Basel before being eliminated by Denmark's Madeleine Dupont. After missing the playoffs at the 2021 Masters, Team Wranå made the playoffs at a Grand Slam event for the first time at the 2021 National before being eliminated in the quarterfinals by Kelsey Rocque. Elsewhere on tour, the team reached the semifinals of both the Red Deer Curling Classic and the International Bernese Ladies Cup. At the Swedish Eliteserien in February, the team defeated Tova Sundberg to claim the event title. They also beat Sundberg in the final of the 2022 Swedish Women's Curling Championship in March. Team Wranå wrapped up their season at the 2022 Players' Championship Grand Slam where they once again qualified for the playoffs. They then lost to Tracy Fleury in the quarterfinal round. A highlight of the Players' Championship came when Wranå lost her broom during one of her shots in the game against Krista McCarville, however, she was still able to deliver the stone. After the season, Jennie Wåhlin stepped back from competitive curling and was replaced by Linda Stenlund. The revised lineup of the team saw Wranå and de Val continue at skip and third while Larsson moved up to second and Stenlund slotted in at lead.

Team Wranå finished third at their second event of the 2022–23 season, the 2022 Oslo Cup, defeating Marianne Rørvik 6–2. In September, the team competed in the European Qualifier best-of-seven series against Team Hasselborg, which they lost 4–1. They then had a quarterfinal finish at the 2022 Women's Masters Basel after a previously unbeaten record. In the first Slam of the season, the 2022 National, they finished pool play with a 2–2 record, but then lost 7–2 in a tiebreaker to the newly formed Kaitlyn Lawes rink. At the 2022 Tour Challenge, they again went 2–2 to qualify for a tiebreaker, which they won 7–4 over Hollie Duncan. Team Wranå then beat the World Champion Silvana Tirinzoni rink in the quarters before losing to Team Rachel Homan in the semifinal, marking the first time the team qualified for a Slam semifinal. They then lost in the final of the Sundbyberg Open to Team Hasselborg. The next Slam was the 2022 Masters, where the team missed the playoffs with a 1–3 record. The team began the New Year at the 2023 Canadian Open, where they qualified through the A side, defeating Team Hasselborg in the A final game. In the playoffs, they defeated Jennifer Jones in the quarterfinals before losing to Kerri Einarson in the semifinals. Team Wranå's next event was the 2023 International Bernese Ladies Cup where they went undefeated until the final where they fell to Team Tirinzoni. The following month, they played in the Swedish Women's Curling Championship, finishing second behind Hasselborg. That same month, the team faced off against Hasselborg again for a chance to play in the 2023 World Women's Curling Championship. The two teams played in a best-of-seven series, with Hasselborg winning in seven games. In their next two events, they finished third at the Sun City Cup and won the Swedish Eliteserien. The team finished off their season at the 2023 Players' Championship. There, Wranå led her team to a 4–1 record in group play, earning a bye to the semifinals. In the playoffs, she defeated Einarson, and then Tirinzoni in the finals to claim the team's first ever Grand Slam title.

After suffering defeats to Team Hasselborg in both of their first two tour events, Team Wranå turned things around at the European qualifier as they won the series 4–2, earning them the right to represent Sweden at the 2023 European Curling Championships. In preparation for the Euros, the team played in the 2023 Players Open where they lost to Hasselborg in the final. They also played in two Slams, the 2023 Tour Challenge and the 2023 National, reaching the quarterfinals of the latter. In November, the team represented Sweden at the Europeans in Aberdeen. There, they finished third through the round robin with a 6–3 record, earning a spot in the playoffs. They then lost both the semifinal and bronze medal game to Italy and Norway respectively, finishing fourth. Back on tour, they reached the semifinals of the 2023 Western Showdown and the quarterfinals of the 2023 Masters and the 2024 International Bernese Ladies Cup. Days before the 2024 Swedish Women's Championship, Team Hasselborg was appointed to represent Sweden at the 2024 World Women's Curling Championship as they had accumulated more points than Team Wranå in their best five events. The team then lost the final of the Swedish Championship to Hasselborg. In February, Team Wranå won their sole event title of the season after an undefeated run at the Sun City Cup. To end the season, the team tried to defend their title at the 2024 Players' Championship. After a 4–1 record through the round robin, they beat Korea's Gim Eun-ji in the semifinal before coming up short to Silvana Tirinzoni in a rematch of the 2023 final.

To begin the 2024–25 season, Team Wranå lost the best-of-seven European qualifier to Team Hasselborg in four games. They also lost to Hasselborg in the quarterfinals of the 2024 Women's Masters Basel. On the Canadian tour, the team qualified for the semifinals at the 2024 Stu Sells Toronto Tankard and Saville Grand Prix and reached the quarterfinals at the 2024 Tour Challenge Slam. In December 2024, they won the WCT Take-Out Trophy, defeating Ikue Kitazawa in the final. In the new year, the team advanced to the semifinals of the 2025 Masters where they were again bested by Hasselborg. The following month, they defended their title at the Sun City Cup with an undefeated run. After Hasselborg was selected to represent Sweden at the 2025 World Women's Curling Championship, Team Wranå ended their season at the 2025 Players' Championship where after reaching the final in the previous two years, they finished with a 2–3 record.

In May 2025, Team Hasselborg was named as the Swedish Olympic team for the 2026 Winter Olympics and were also chosen for the 2025 European Curling Championships. Still chasing qualification points for the 2026 World Women's Curling Championship, Team Wranå began the season with a pair of semifinal finishes at the 2025 Stu Sells Oakville Tankard and 2025 Masters Slam. They also qualified for the quarterfinals at two other Slams, the 2025 Tour Challenge and 2026 Players' Championship, as well as the 2025 Canadian Open Tier 2. At the 2026 International Bernese Ladies Cup, Team Wranå lost in the final to Team Tirinzoni, however, without Wranå herself as she was preparing for the mixed doubles competition at the Olympics. With their consistent playoff finishes throughout the season, the team earned enough points to surpass Hasselborg and qualify for the World Women's Championship, their first appearance at the event. There, Wranå led her team to an 8–4 record in the round robin. They then beat South Korea in the quarterfinals before dropping the semifinal to Switzerland. In the bronze medal game, the team won 8–5 over Japan's Satsuki Fujisawa to secure a podium finish.

Team Wranå started the 2026-27 curling season off strong, winning the 2026 Swedish European Qualifiers, winning the 2026 Karuizawa International Curling Championships, and a quarterfinal finish at the 2026 GSOC Invitational Slam. This success would continue into the 2026 European Curling Championships, where they would go undefeated and win their first European championship, beating Switzerland's Alina Pätz 7–2 in the final.

=== Mixed doubles ===
Wranå participates in mixed doubles curling with her brother Rasmus. They two won their first mixed doubles tour event at the 2020 Mixed Doubles Bern event. In 2022, the pair represented Sweden at the 2022 World Mixed Doubles Curling Championship in Geneva, Switzerland. After a 7–2 round robin record, they lost to Germany's Pia-Lisa Schöll and Klaudius Harsch in a qualification game, eliminating them in fifth place. Isabella and Rasmus also represented Sweden at the 2024 World Mixed Doubles Curling Championship as the hometown team, being held in Östersund. At the 2024 Championship, the team went 8–1 in the round robin, earning a bye to the semifinal. They then beat Switzerland's Briar Schwaller-Hürlimann and Yannick Schwaller before going on to defeat Estonia's Marie Kaldvee and Harri Lill 8–4 in the gold medal game. It was Wranå's first world adult championship title. The following year, the pair was unable to defend their title as they lost in the final of the 2025 Swedish Mixed Doubles Championship to Anna Hasselborg and Oskar Eriksson. However, as Hasselborg and Eriksson missed the playoffs at the 2025 World Mixed Doubles Curling Championship, the Wranå siblings were selected to represent Sweden in mixed doubles at the 2026 Winter Olympics, marking Wranå's first Olympic appearance.

In preparation for their Olympic campaign, the Wranå's played in two tour events, reaching the quarterfinals at both the Uppsala Mixed Doubles and the Gothenburg Mixed Doubles Cup. At the Games, the siblings won their first two games over South Korea and Czechia, however, then suffered three consecutive losses to Estonia, Great Britain and Norway. They turned things around, however, with three wins in a row over Switzerland, Italy and Canada before closing out the round robin with a loss to the United States. Their 5–4 record was enough to earn them the fourth playoff seed. In the knockout round, they upset the top ranked British duo of Jennifer Dodds and Bruce Mouat in the semifinals to advance to the final against the United States' Cory Thiesse and Korey Dropkin. Down one in the last end, Wranå removed the American shot rock with her final stone to score two and win the Olympic gold medal, 6–5 the final score.

=== Mixed team ===
Wranå also represented Sweden at the 2014 European Mixed Curling Championship, throwing third rocks for the team, which was skipped by Patric Mabergs. The team would go on to win the gold medal. Wranå skipped the Swedish mixed team and threw third rocks at the 2017 World Mixed Curling Championship. The team, which included Patric Mabergs, Johannes Patz and Sofia Mabergs went undefeated in group play, but lost to Scotland in the quarterfinals.

== Personal life ==
Wranå attended high school at Härnösands gymnasium. She lives in Stockholm. Her brother is Rasmus Wranå, himself a Swedish curler, and her mixed doubles partner.

Wranå works as a development coordinator for Swedish Curling.

== Grand Slam record ==
Key
C	Champion
F	Lost in Final
SF	Lost in Semifinal
QF	Lost in Quarterfinals
R16	Lost in the round of 16
Q	Did not advance to playoffs
T2	Played in Tier 2 event
DNP	Did not participate in event
N/A	Not a Grand Slam event that season

Event	2016–17	2017–18	2018–19	2019–20	2020–21	2021–22	2022–23	2023–24	2024–25	2025–26	2026–27
Invitational	DNP	DNP	Q	Q	N/A	N/A	SF	Q	QF	QF	QF
Masters	DNP	DNP	DNP	DNP	N/A	Q	Q	QF	SF	SF	C
National	DNP	DNP	Q	Q	N/A	QF	Q	QF	Q	Q	QF
Open	DNP	DNP	Q	DNP	N/A	N/A	SF	Q	Q	T2	
Players'	DNP	DNP	DNP	N/A	DNP	QF	C	F	Q	QF	
Champions Cup	Q	DNP	Q	N/A	DNP	DNP	DNP	N/A	N/A	N/A	N/A
