= World Financial Group =

Multi-level marketing company

Coordinates: 41.9157834°N 91.63731°W

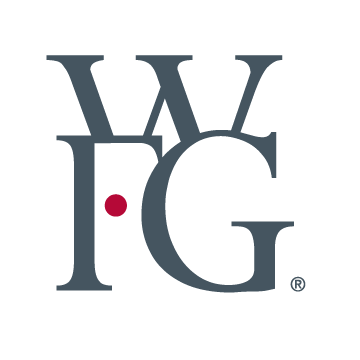
- Official logo since October 23, 2012
- Formerly: World Marketing Alliance (WMA)
- Type: Subsidiary
- Industry: Financial services
- Founded: 1991; 35 years ago
- Founder: Hubert Humphrey
- Headquarters: 6400 C Street SW, Cedar Rapids, Iowa, U.S.
- Key people: Michael Brodeur (President)
- Products: Life insurance; Retirement planning; Insurance
- Number of employees: 500+
- Parent: Aegon (Operates under the Transamerica brand in the United States)
- Subsidiaries: World Group Securities (WGS)
- Website: www.worldfinancialgroup.com

World Financial Group (WFG) is a multi-level marketing financial and insurance services company based in Johns Creek, Georgia, a suburb of Atlanta, which sells investment, insurance, and various other financial products through a network of distributors in the United States, Canada, and Puerto Rico. It is wholly owned by Dutch life insurance multinational Aegon and operates primarily under the Transamerica brand in the United States.

World Financial Group associates are compensated by selling financial services products and receiving commission overrides from people that agents sponsor into the company.

== History ==
=== World Marketing Alliance (1991–2001) ===
One of the notable, official World Marketing Alliance logos; Contains a bust of Alexander the Great in the center.

World Marketing Alliance (WMA) was founded by Hubert Humphrey when he left Primerica in 1991. The original name was Alexander, Inc. but shortly thereafter was renamed World Marketing Alliance. The original idea was that the baby boomers needed a solution for wealth creation and tax protection, and that the "buy term and invest the difference" philosophy of Primerica (formerly A.L. Williams & Associates) could be better addressed with variable universal life insurance.

While in A.L. Williams & Associates, Humphrey created and introduced the Business Format System (BFS), a business sales and recruiting methodology. Humphrey continued to develop the methodology in WMA. MD TV, the company's private satellite television network, was also introduced during this period. The company expanded its operations to Canada, Taiwan, Mexico, Puerto Rico, Guam and the Philippines. The company held its first convention in Las Vegas in 1992. It was attended by about 2,000 associates.

On March 23, 1998, WMA Executive World Headquarters opened in Duluth, Georgia. The 100,000-square-foot (9,300 m^{2}) building housed 500+ employees.

By 1999, WMA sold a total of $200 million worth of variable life premiums a total of $400 million in mutual fund sales. By May 2000, WMA had a total of "63,000 people pushing mortgages and credit cards" and "10,700 licensed [representatives] who can sell mutual funds" through its subsidiary company WMA Securities: where the company's team of brokers work and are accounted for.

In June 2001, select assets of WMA were purchased by Aegon and renamed World Financial Group, Inc. Humphrey retained WMA Mortgage Services, Inc. and the original logo, which was used in his subsequent companies World Leadership Group (WLG) and Hegemon Group International (HGI). As part of the conditions of sale, Humphrey was placed on a noncompete agreement and could not compete in the insurance industry until 2013. Following the sale of WMA to Aegon, Alexander Wynaendts, chief executive of Aegon, was quoted as saying, "When we took the company over, we put in place very strict regulatory and compliance procedures".

=== World Financial Group (2001–present) ===
World Financial Group Previous Official Logo from inception, in 2001, until October 23, 2012

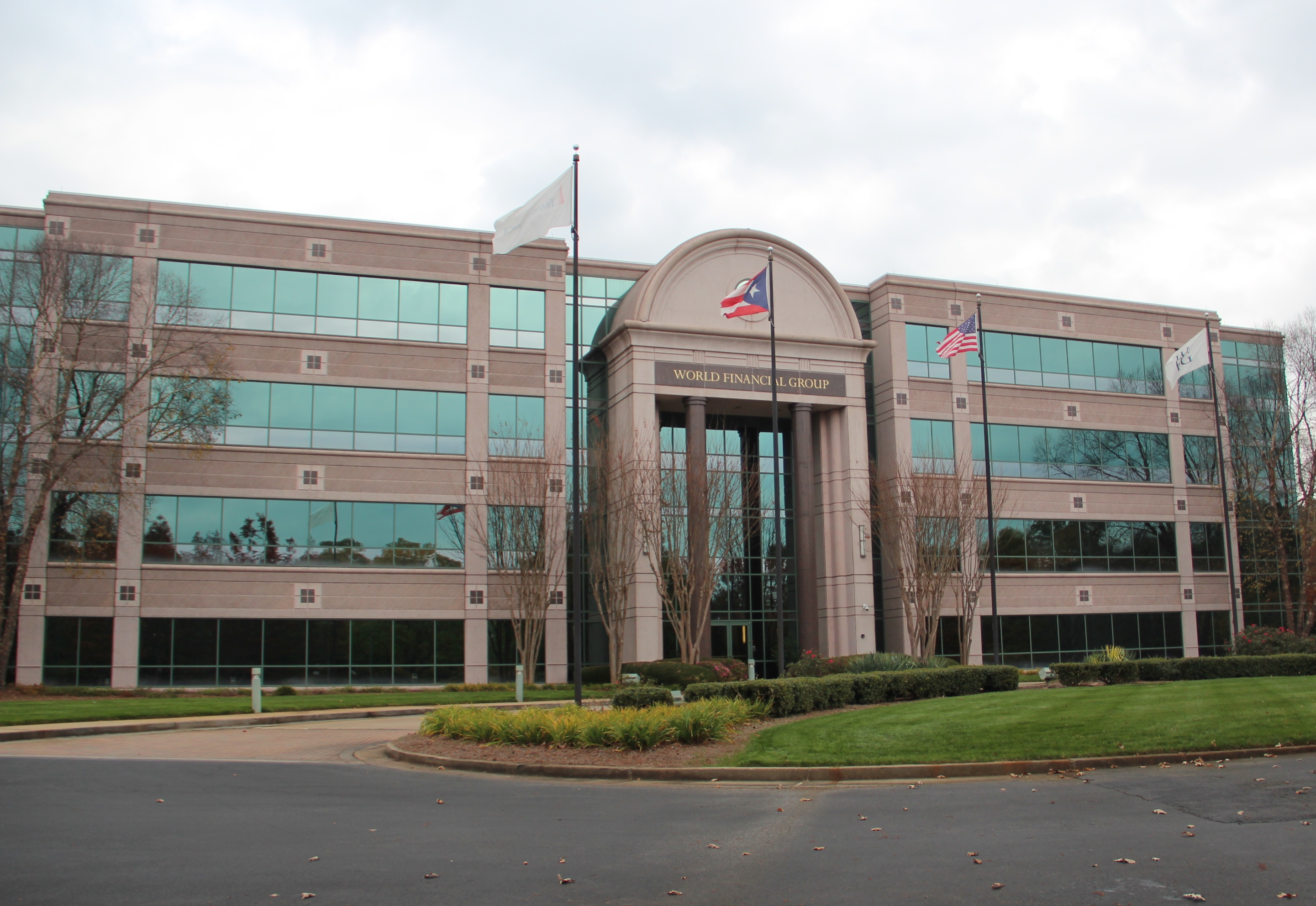
World Financial Group offices in Johns Creek, Georgia

In 2008, the company was criticized by customers who claimed to have lost significant sums due to WFG agents selling them "inappropriate investments".

In 2015, John Hancock Financial, a Boston-based insurance company, acquired 1,100 advisors from Transamerica World Financial Group.

World Financial Group has over 3,500 offices in the United States. The World Financial Group Canadian division, World Financial Group Insurance Agency of Canada Inc., moved to Toronto, Ontario in February 2012. In 2008, World Financial Group had over 80 Canadian offices and over 1,500 agents. On July 1, 2013, WFG Securities of Canada, Inc. changed its name to Transamerica Securities, Inc.

As of 2022, there are approximately 53,200 independent life insurance agents associated with WFGIA in the United States and its affiliated insurance agency operating in Canada.

In September 2022, the World Financial Group Agency of Canada (WFGIAC) renewed its sponsorship of the 2022 Pinty’s Grand Slam of Curling.

In November 2022, Transamerica appointed Todd Buchanan President of World Financial Group Insurance Agency, LLC (WFG), Senior Vice President at Transamerica, and head of Transamerica Financial Advisors, Inc. (TFA).

In April 2023, the Financial Services Regulatory Authority of Ontario (FSRA) sent an enforcement notice to WFG's Canada office requesting a submissions on a tri-monthly basis "the names and license numbers" over concerns that 10,000-plus OrCanadian agents were selling complex products without performing "direct monitoring and supervision of agents", "having specific individuals or departments formally overseeing the entire licensed agent monitoring function" and with "no formal proactive agent reviews", as alleged. One month later, WFG's Canada location agreed to form a supervision team that would evaluate its agents based on "risk-based selection, representative sampling, and reviews of newly sponsored agents.

== Regulatory issues ==
Since the company's founding, WMA/WFG have been fined numerous times via complaints from former clients.

- In November 1998, WMA was fined $100,000 by the Arizona Corporation Commission "for not properly supervising its sales agents" after their clients lost nearly $2 million in unregistered investments.
- In June 2000, WMA paid back $1.29 million, in total, to more than a dozen Massachusetts residents who were sold "Certificate of deposit[s] in a nonexistent bank" in exchange, per settlement, for the state to drop its charges against the company over state securities law violations.
- In November 2000, WMA was fined $125,000 by the National Association of Securities Dealers (NASD) "for failing to report nearly 900 customer complaints".
- In November 2001, WMA paid back $288,166, in total, to four Western Massachusetts residents who were sold, in 1999 by a former WMA agent, "investments in coin-operated telephones made by ETS Payphones, Inc., promising... 15 percent interest annually".
- In November 2004, World Group Securities (WGS) was fined $150,000 by the NASD for failing to report 61% of disciplinary reports (i.e. customer complaints, disciplinary actions, and criminal charges and convictions) on time. WGS was one of 29 investment firms to be fined.
- In October 2006, the Utah Division of Securities suspended two state licenses from and filed a lawsuit against two WGS agents from Utah County, Utah: Andrew J. Moleff and John F. Hoschouer and was ordered by the state to pay a combined fine of $155,000 for lying about their financial talents such as both individuals' "asset management skills [during] investment seminars for seniors" and "overstating the size of the investment portfolio they managed". Additionally, Hoschouer made false claims about Moleff being the "number one financial adviser" of WGS and never losing a single client for eight consecutive years. Both individuals were barred from Financial Industry Regulatory Authority (FINRA), as a result.
- In December 2006, WGS and one of its brokers were fined $150,000 by Missouri's commissioner of securities for "making unsuitable sales of variable annuities".
- In April 2007, WGS was fined $50,000 for failing to supervise its representatives in the State of Utah, who were misrepresenting their credentials and services rendered during free lunch seminars targeting seniors.
- In September 2007, Utah Division of Securities fined WGS $50,000 for failure to "disclose that the client was [the WGS agent's] father" during a sales pitch where he stated that the agent and agent's family were invited to do a sales pitch for the client.
- In May 2016, Mutual Fund Dealers Association (MFDA) accepted a settlement agreement of $60,000 with WFG Securities for contraventions of the By-Laws, Rules, or Policies of the MFDA.
- In January 2018, 12 life insurance agents who worked together at the same WFG brokerage in British Columbia, Canada had lost their licences because they all conspired to cheat on their qualification tests, according to the provincial regulator. In response, the company suspended the agents and noted that the agency would be "taking all necessary steps regarding the matter.
- In December 2018, 12 former Mississauga WFG agents, in Ontario, Canada, were fined $865,000 for falsifying KYC (know your client) information of a total of 95 documents, and committing other offences to facilitate leveraging investments. They also failed to cooperate with MFDA summons for interviews.
- In May 2024, the FSRA fined WFG $50,000 for compensating a Canadian unlicensed agent, affiliated with the company, that sold a total of 58 life insurance policies between October 2021 and July 2022. The unlicensed agent was fined $80,000, by the FSRA, for acting as an agent without a license.
- In October 2025, WFG was ordered by the San Francisco County Superior Court, in San Francisco, California, to pay $65 million to settle a class action lawsuit over allegations of "misclassifying its sales agents as independent contractors".

== Organizations utilizing WFG's System ==
The following organizations utilize WFG to conduct the organizations' everyday business. While they're not direct subsidiaries to WFG, its members are WFG insurance agents/brokers.

- Axianta Financial Partners
- Dynamic Expansion
- The Miliare Group
- Managed Wealth Financial
- Revolution Financial Management
- WealthWave
- World System Builder
- The Tax Advisors
- Virtuity Financial Partners
