= Hubert Humphrey (businessman) =

American businessman and founder of World Marketing Alliance

- Born: Steeley Hubert Humphrey Jr. February 1942 (age 84); Macon, Georgia, U.S.
- Education: Georgia Institute of Technology (dropped out)
- Occupations: Businessman; Insurance broker
- Employer(s): Primerica; World Marketing Alliance (WMA); World Leadership Group (WLG); Hegemon Group International (HGI)
- Known for: Founder & CEO of multi-level marketing (MLM) financial services company World Marketing Alliance (nka World Financial Group)
- Partner: Norma Wynelle Patrick (m. 1961)
- Children: 4
- Awards: Entrepreneurship Hall Of Fame (2025)
- Website: hgicrusade.com

Steeley Hubert Humphrey Jr. (born February 1942), better known as Hubert Humphrey, is an American businessman, financial executive, and insurance broker. He is best known for founding and leading multi-level marketing financial and insurance services company World Marketing Alliance (WMA) (nka World Financial Group) in 1991, and is currently the Founder, Chief Executive Officer (CEO), and Chairman of Hegemon Group International (HGI).

== Early life and education ==
Humphrey was born in February 1942 and raised in Macon, Georgia to life and accident insurance agent and World War II Sergeant Steeley Hubert Humphrey Sr. (father) and June Smith Humphrey (mother). Humphrey is the couple's eldest child, and has two sisters and one brother. When Humphrey was a baby, he won a "year's supply of diapers and milk" from a "baby contest sponsored by Carnation" that his mother entered him in. Growing up, Humphrey used to work at a drug store as a soda jerk, a Texaco gas station pumping gas, a grocery store as a floor sweeper and a bicycle deliveryman, a shoe store, a bakery, a plumbing company, and a service station.

Humphrey is a graduate of Lanier Miller High School in 1960. Humphrey then attended Georgia Tech to study Electrical engineering, but dropped out after his freshman year because of his and his wife's first son's expected birth.

== Career ==
=== Railroad Conductor ===
Humphrey worked as a brakeman and a railroad conductor for both Southern Railway (U.S.) and Central of Georgia Railway for the next seventeen years. Among his tasks included, "wav[ing]... lantern[s] and directing [and driving] trains" around Macon.

In 1968, Humphrey became an Amway distributor as part of a lifelong dream of wanting to get away from his railroad conductor job and to "be [his] own boss", to "control [his] future", and to no longer be "average and ordinary". As a distributor, Humphrey learned "the basics of recruiting and building an organization". Humphrey quit because selling Amway products was a "fun way to make no money".

=== Insurance Agency Career ===
==== A.L. Williams/Primerica (1977–1991) ====
In 1977, Humphrey was introduced to A.L. Williams (nka Primerica) through an acquaintance, from his Mormon church, that attempted to sell him term life insurance. While at A.L. Williams part-time, Humphrey was promoted to as high as being a national sales director in 1978. That same year, Humphrey resigned from Southern Railway to dedicate to A.L. Williams full-time. In 1987, Humphrey was named "most valuable leader of the decade". At the peak of his career, Humphrey's team consisted of, at most, "50,000 people under him", and took home more than $3 million per year.

==== World Marketing Alliance (WMA) (1991-2001) ====
In 1991, Humphrey left Primerica to start his own insurance marketing company: World Marketing Alliance (WMA). The reasoning for this move was because he was "irked by Primerica's clampdown on commissions from Insurance policies". WMA acts as a vendor that primarily sold variable universal life insurance (VUL) and variable annuities from insurance companies like Aegon, American Skandia (now part of Prudential Financial), Western Reserve (now part of Aegon), Pacific Life, and Zurich Kemper to "Americans... who don't own stocks, either directly or through mutual funds of retirement plans", "don't have traditional brokers" and "lack the financial confidence to... invest in a mutual fund on their own." By 1999, Humphrey's company sold a total of $200 million worth of variable life premiums (insurance) and a total of $400 million in mutual fund sales. By May 2000, Humphrey's company had a total of "63,000 people pushing mortgages and credit cards" and "10,700 licensed reps who can sell mutual funds" through WMA Securities: a subsidiary company that sells insurance products and consists of a team of brokers.

In 1999, Humphrey founded Zillionaire.com.

On July 6, 2001, select assets of WMA were sold to Dutch insurance company Aegon for an undisclosed amount and the company was renamed to, what is today, World Financial Group (WFG).

==== World Leadership Group (WLG) and Hegemon Group International (HGI) (2001–present) ====
The assets that Humphrey kept, after the sale to Aegon, were spun-off into a new organization called World Leadership Group (WLG) which was a business that "dedicated to assisting independent entrepreneurs launch their own private business". In 2006, the company moved their headquarters into a 100,000 square foot office in Johns Creek, Georgia.

In 2014, Humphrey founded Hegemon Group International (HGI). The business was acquired by Integrity Marketing Group in 2022.

== La Rêve ==
In the early 2000s, Humphrey and his wife built and owned La Rêve (lit. 'The Dream' in French): A three-storey, 47,000 square-foot mansion in Cumming, Georgia. The mansion contained a total of eighty-two rooms all including a garage with up to twelve cars, seventy-two televisions screens, "two-lane bowling alley, private nine-hole golf course,... [a] movie theater modeled after the Fox Theatre (Atlanta)", seventeen bathrooms, two swimming pools, "a replica of the old Central of Georgia Railway", and a "'50s diner with a full service soda fountain and black and white tile floors". The entire construction process costed $35 million.

The couple hosted Mitt Romney in 2007 and the Rotary Club's Lanier-Forsyth chapter. The couple also offered guided tours to the general public.

The property went into foreclosure in 2010 and the couple listed the house, at the same year, initially for $50 million. The estate was sold for $11.5 million.

== Personal life ==
Humphrey married insurance agent Norma Wynelle Patrick on July 26, 1961. They had four children together, among them were sons Jody and Jeffrey. As of 2023, the couple resided in Suwanee, Georgia. Humphrey served as a Bishop in the LDS church.

Humphrey was among the 2,000 supporters to contribute to the Mitt Romney 2008 presidential campaign

Humphrey was inducted to the Entrepreneurship Hall of Fame in 2025.

== See also ==
- World Financial Group
