= World Group Securities =

- Company type: Subsidiary
- Industry: Financial services
- Founded: 2001; 24 years ago
- Founder: World Marketing Alliance
- Headquarters: Delaware, United States
- Area served: United States
- Products: Purchase, sale, and brokerage of securities
- Owner: Aegon
- Parent: World Financial Group

World Group Securities (WGS) is an American broker-dealer that provides exclusive services to World Financial Group a multi-level marketing financial and insurance services company. WGS is a subsidiary of the Dutch-owned AEGON insurance Group. WGS has been involved in a number of lawsuits with state regulators alleging the selling of unsuitable products to elderly people.

== History ==
World Group Securities was incorporated in Delaware, USA on February 6, 2001, in order to replace World Marketing Alliance Securities (WMAS) as servicing broker-dealer when AEGON bought out the book of business generated by World Marketing Alliance (WMA) and reassigned it to the newly created World Financial Group.

== Business and operations ==
WGS is registered with the Financial Industry Regulatory Authority (FINRA) to sell securities through World Financial Group (WFG) associates in all 50 states plus Washington, D.C. and Puerto Rico under the Central Registration Depository (CRD) number 114473. Its U.S. Securities and Exchange Commission (SEC) number is 8-53428. WGS allows only properly licensed and registered WFG representatives to represent it.

Its registered types of business include:

1. Broker or dealer selling corporate debt securities (for example, bonds)
2. Broker or dealer retailing corporate stocks over-the-counter
3. Government securities broker
4. Mutual fund retailer, some of which are affiliated with WGS
5. Municipal bonds broker
6. Non-exchange member arranging for transactions in listed securities by exchange member
7. Broker or dealer selling variable life insurance contracts or annuities, some of which are affiliated with WGS

== Lawsuits ==
Some state securities officials, including those in Iowa, Alabama, Missouri, Utah, and Minnesota, have filed lawsuits to bar inappropriate sales practices by World Financial Group (WFG) and World Group Securities (WGS). In addition, a number of customers have filed private arbitration claims.

- A 2004 National Association of Securities Dealers (NASD) disciplinary action report summarized disciplinary actions against WGS. According to the report, WGS "submitted a Letter of Acceptance, Waiver, and Consent in which the firm was censured and fined $15,000. Without admitting or denying the allegations, the firm consented to the described sanctions and to the entry of findings that the firm permitted representatives to act in registered capacities while their registrations were inactive due to their failure to satisfy the Regulatory Element of NASD's Continuing Education Requirements. NASD also found that the firm failed to establish and maintain a supervisory system reasonably designed to assure compliance with the Regulatory Element of the Continuing Education Requirement by its registered representatives."
- In December 2006, WGS and one of its brokers were fined $150,000 by Missouri's commissioner of securities for selling unsuitable products to elderly people. Other cases of private arbitration "where variable annuities were allegedly sold to people too old to realize any benefit before they died" were also reported. Utah’s Division of Securities has cited at least four WGS brokers since 2006.
- In April 2007, WGS was fined $50,000 for failing to supervise representatives in Utah who were misrepresenting their credentials and services rendered during free lunch seminars targeting seniors.
- In June 2007, a couple filed an NASD arbitration claim against WGS, alleging misrepresentation that caused them to lose over $500,000 on investment products that were unsuitable for their risk tolerance. A judge sided with the couple and forced the company into arbitration over the proceedings, and a settlement was reached.
- In April 2010, WGS was fined in excess of $850,000 as the result of the unauthorized sale of private securities by some of its agents in the State of Arizona.
- In May 2010, the U.S. Securities and Exchange Commission (SEC) filed a federal case against two former brokers of WGS, accusing them of having raised approximately $14,800,000 through the offer and sale of promissory notes as part of an illegal Ponzi scheme in Ohio and Florida between September 2005 and December 2008.
- In November 2010, the U.S. Securities and Exchange Commission (SEC) ordered WGS to pay, among other things, a civil monetary penalty in the amount of $200,000 for the fraudulent selling of unsuitable securities in the State of California, which were funded using home equity derived from refinancing the customers' homes into subprime mortgages.
