= 2013 Challenge Chateau Cartier de Gatineau =

- Host city: Masson & Buckingham, Quebec
- Arena: Centre Sportif Robert Rochon & Buckingham Curling Club
- Dates: October 24–27, 2013
- Men's winner: (Newfoundland and Labrador) Brad Gushue
- Curling club: Bally Haly G&CC, St. John's, Newfoundland and Labrador
- Skip: Brad Gushue
- Third: Brett Gallant
- Second: Adam Casey
- Lead: Geoff Walker
- Finalist: (Ontario) Robert Rumfeldt
- Women's winner: (Ontario) Lisa Farnell
- Curling club: Loonie CC, Chaffeys Locks, Ontario
- Skip: Lisa Farnell
- Third: Erin Morrissey
- Second: Karen Sagle
- Lead: Ainsley Galbraith
- Finalist: (Ontario) Katie Morrissey

The 2013 Challenge Chateau Cartier de Gatineau was held October 24 to 27, 2013 at the Buckingham Curling Club in Buckingham, Quebec and the Centre Sportif Robert Rochon in Masson, Quebec as part of the 2013–14 World Curling Tour. The purses for the men's and women's were CAD$42,500 and CAD$15,000, respectively.

2006 Olympic gold medalist Brad Gushue of Newfoundland defeated Guelph, Ontario's Robert Rumfeldt in the men's final. Toronto's Lisa Farnell won the women's event, defeating her third (Erin Morrissey)'s younger sister Katie Morrissey of Ottawa in the final.

== Men ==
=== Playoffs ===
Quarterfinals
(Quebec) Jean-Michel Ménard	5
(Ontario) Brian Lewis	4
(Ontario) Bryan Cochrane	4
(Ontario) Robert Rumfeldt	6
(Newfoundland and Labrador) Brad Gushue	3
(Ontario) Brad Jacobs	2
(Ontario) Howard Rajala	7
(Ontario) Mark Kean	6

Semifinals
(Quebec) Jean-Michel Ménard	3
(Ontario) Robert Rumfeldt	5
(Newfoundland and Labrador) Brad Gushue	7
(Ontario) Howard Rajala	2

Finals
(Ontario) Robert Rumfeldt	3
(Newfoundland and Labrador) Brad Gushue	6

== Women ==
=== Playoffs ===
Quarterfinals
(Quebec) Kimberly Mastine	6
(Ontario) Lisa Farnell	7
(Ontario) Katie Morrissey	6
(Ontario) Cathy Auld	3

Semifinals
(Ontario) Rachel Homan	4
(Ontario) Lisa Farnell	5
(Sweden) Cecilia Östlund	5
(Ontario) Katie Morrissey	9

Final
(Ontario) Lisa Farnell	7
(Ontario) Katie Morrissey	4
