= 2014–15 curling season =

- Sport: Curling

Seasons
- ← 2013–14 2015–16 →

The 2014–15 curling season began in August 2014 and ended in May 2015.

Note: In events with two genders, the men's tournament winners are listed before the women's tournament winners.

== Curling Canada sanctioned events ==
This section lists events sanctioned by and/or conducted by the Canadian Curling Association now known as Curling Canada. The following events in bold have been confirmed by the Curling Canada as are part of the 2014–15 Season of Champions programme.

Event	Winning team	Runner-up team
Canadian Mixed Curling Championship; North Bay, Ontario, Nov. 10–15	Saskatchewan	Northwest Territories
Travelers Curling Club Championship; Halifax, Nova Scotia, Nov. 24–29	Saskatchewan	Ontario
Travelers Curling Club Championship; Halifax, Nova Scotia, Nov. 24–29	Ontario	Prince Edward Island
**Canada Cup**; Camrose, Alberta, Dec. 3–7	(Manitoba) Mike McEwen	(Ontario) Brad Jacobs
**Canada Cup**; Camrose, Alberta, Dec. 3–7	(Alberta) Valerie Sweeting	(Ontario) Rachel Homan
**Continental Cup of Curling**; Calgary, Alberta, Jan. 8–11	Team Canada	(European Union) Team Europe
**Canadian Junior Curling Championships**; Corner Brook, Newfoundland and Labrador, Jan. 24 – Feb. 1	Manitoba	Saskatchewan
**Canadian Junior Curling Championships**; Corner Brook, Newfoundland and Labrador, Jan. 24 – Feb. 1	Alberta	Ontario
Winter Universiade; Granada, Spain, Feb. 5–13	Norway	Russia
Winter Universiade; Granada, Spain, Feb. 5–13	Russia	Canada
World Wheelchair Curling Championship; Lohja, Finland, Feb. 7–13	Russia	China
**Tournament of Hearts**; Moose Jaw, Saskatchewan, Feb. 14–22	Manitoba	Alberta
Canada Winter Games; Prince George, British Columbia, Feb. 14–28	Manitoba	Ontario
Canada Winter Games; Prince George, British Columbia, Feb. 14–28	Ontario	Nova Scotia
**Tim Hortons Brier**; Calgary, Alberta, Feb. 28 – Mar. 8	Canada	Northern Ontario
World Junior Curling Championships; Tallinn, Estonia, Feb. 28 – Mar. 8	Canada	Switzerland
World Junior Curling Championships; Tallinn, Estonia, Feb. 28 – Mar. 8	Canada	Scotland
Canadian Mixed Doubles Curling Trials; Ottawa, Ontario, Mar. 11–15	(Alberta) Thomas/Park	(Ontario) Abbis-Mills/Bobbie
World Women's Curling Championship; Sapporo, Japan, Mar. 14–22	Switzerland	Canada
CIS/CCA University Curling Championships; Kitchener-Waterloo, Ontario, Mar. 18–22	Alberta Golden Bears	(Ontario) Wilfrid Laurier Golden Hawks
CIS/CCA University Curling Championships; Kitchener-Waterloo, Ontario, Mar. 18–22	Alberta Pandas	(British Columbia) Thompson Rivers WolfPack
Canadian Senior Curling Championships; Edmonton, Alberta, Mar. 21–29	Manitoba	Quebec
Canadian Senior Curling Championships; Edmonton, Alberta, Mar. 21–29	Alberta	Nova Scotia
CCAA Curling National Championships; Olds, Alberta, Mar. 25–28	(Ontario) Fleming Knights	(Ontario) Fanshawe Falcons
CCAA Curling National Championships; Olds, Alberta, Mar. 25–28	(Ontario) Fanshawe Falcons	(Ontario) Humber Hawks
World Men's Curling Championship; Halifax, Nova Scotia, Mar. 28 – Apr. 5	Sweden	Norway
Canadian Masters Curling Championships; Whitehorse, Yukon, Mar. 30 – Apr. 5	Manitoba	Northern Ontario
Canadian Masters Curling Championships; Whitehorse, Yukon, Mar. 30 – Apr. 5	British Columbia	Ontario
World Mixed Doubles Curling Championship; Sochi, Russia, Apr. 18–25	Hungary	Sweden
World Senior Curling Championships; Sochi, Russia, Apr. 18–25	United States	Canada
World Senior Curling Championships; Sochi, Russia, Apr. 18–25	Canada	Italy
Canadian Wheelchair Curling Championship; Boucherville, Quebec, Apr. 27 – May 3	British Columbia	Quebec

== Other events ==
Note: Events that have not been placed on the CCA's list of sanctioned events are listed here. If an event is listed on the CCA's final list for the 2014–15 curling season, it will be moved up to the "CCA-sanctioned events" section.

Event	Winning team		Runner-up team
European Mixed Curling Championship; Tårnby, Denmark, Sep. 13–20	Sweden		Norway
European Curling Championships – Group C Zoetermeer, Netherlands, Oct. 6–11	C	Belgium	Israel
European Curling Championships – Group C Zoetermeer, Netherlands, Oct. 6–11	C	Netherlands	Slovakia
World Wheelchair Curling Championship Qualification; Lillehammer, Norway, Nov. 1–6	Norway		Germany
Pacific-Asia Curling Championships; Karuizawa, Japan, Nov. 8–16	China		Japan
Pacific-Asia Curling Championships; Karuizawa, Japan, Nov. 8–16	China		South Korea
European Curling Championships; Champéry, Switzerland, Nov. 22–29	A	Sweden	Norway
European Curling Championships; Champéry, Switzerland, Nov. 22–29	A	Switzerland	Russia
European Curling Championships; Champéry, Switzerland, Nov. 22–29	B	Finland	Netherlands
European Curling Championships; Champéry, Switzerland, Nov. 22–29	B	Norway	Hungary
European Junior Curling Challenge; Prague, Czech Republic, Jan. 3–8	Russia		Spain
European Junior Curling Challenge; Prague, Czech Republic, Jan. 3–8	England		Turkey
Pinty's All-Star Curling Skins Game; Banff, Alberta, Jan. 16–18	Team Brad Jacobs		Team John Morris
Pinty's All-Star Curling Skins Game; Banff, Alberta, Jan. 16–18	Team Rachel Homan		Team Jennifer Jones
Pacific-Asia Junior Curling Championships; Naseby, New Zealand, Jan. 17–24	South Korea		China
Pacific-Asia Junior Curling Championships; Naseby, New Zealand, Jan. 17–24	South Korea		China
Americas Challenge; Blaine, Minnesota, Jan. 30 – Feb. 1	United States		Brazil

== World Curling Tour ==
Grand Slam events in bold.

=== Men's events ===
Week	Event	Winning skip	Runner-up skip
1	Baden Masters; Baden, Switzerland, Aug. 29–31	(Norway) Thomas Ulsrud	(Switzerland) Peter de Cruz
2	StuSells Oakville Tankard; Oakville, Ontario, Sep. 4–7	(Manitoba) Mike McEwen	(Ontario) John Epping
3	HDF Insurance Shoot-Out; Edmonton, Alberta, Sep. 11–14	(Alberta) Brendan Bottcher	(Saskatchewan) Steve Laycock
4	AMJ Campbell Shorty Jenkins Classic; Brockville, Ontario, Sep. 18–21	(Ontario) Brad Jacobs	(Prince Edward Island) Adam Casey
4	Twin Cities Open; Blaine, Minnesota, Sep. 19–21	(Minnesota) Korey Dropkin	(Minnesota) Nina Spatola (Note: The finalist, Nina Spatola, skipped a women's team. The event was open to both men's and women's teams.)
4	Cloverdale Cash Spiel; Surrey, British Columbia, Sep. 19–21	(British Columbia) Grant Dezura	(British Columbia) Sean Geall
5	Point Optical Curling Classic; Saskatoon, Saskatchewan, Sep. 26–29	(Manitoba) Mike McEwen	(Ontario) John Epping
5	KW Fall Classic; Kitchener-Waterloo, Ontario, Sep. 25–28	(Ontario) Scott McDonald	(Ontario) Richard Krell
5	Mother Club Fall Curling Classic; Winnipeg, Manitoba, Sep. 25–28	(Manitoba) Sean Grassie	(Manitoba) Steve Irwin
5	Gibson's Cashspiel; Lower Sackville, Nova Scotia, Sep. 25–28	(Nova Scotia) Jamie Danbrook	(Nova Scotia) Chad Stevens
6	Swiss Cup Basel; Basel, Switzerland, Oct. 3–5	(Scotland) Tom Brewster	(Switzerland) Sven Michel
6	Prestige Hotels & Resorts Curling Classic; Vernon, British Columbia, Oct. 3–6	(British Columbia) Grant Dezura	(British Columbia) Brent Pierce
6	Avonair Cash Spiel; Edmonton, Alberta, Oct. 3–5	(South Korea) Kim Soo-hyuk	(Alberta) Daylan Vavrek
7	Direct Horizontal Drilling Fall Classic; Edmonton, Alberta, Oct. 10–13	(Alberta) Kevin Koe	(Saskatchewan) Steve Laycock
7	StuSells Toronto Tankard; Toronto, Ontario, Oct. 10–13	(Manitoba) Reid Carruthers	(Ontario) Brad Jacobs
7	St. Paul Cash Spiel; St. Paul, Minnesota, Oct. 10–12	(Minnesota) Mike Farbelow	(Minnesota) Korey Dropkin
7	KMC Rocktoberfest; Regina, Saskatchewan, Oct. 10–13	(Saskatchewan) Randy Bryden	(Saskatchewan) Jamie Schneider
7	Alexander Keith's Men's Cashspiel; Halifax, Nova Scotia, Oct. 10–13	(Nova Scotia) Ian Fitzner-Leblanc	(Nova Scotia) Tommy Sullivan
8	Canad Inns Men's Classic; Portage la Prairie, Manitoba, Oct. 17–20	(Manitoba) Mike McEwen	(Manitoba) Jeff Stoughton
8	Kamloops Crown of Curling; Kamloops, British Columbia, Oct. 17–20	(British Columbia) Brent Pierce	(British Columbia) Sean Geall
8	Medicine Hat Charity Classic; Medicine Hat, Alberta, Oct. 17–20	(Alberta) Sean O'Connor	(Saskatchewan) Scott Bitz
8	Stroud Sleeman Cash Spiel; Stroud, Ontario, Oct. 16–19	(Ontario) Colin Dow	(Ontario) Scott McDonald
8	Thompson Curling Challenge; Urdorf, Switzerland, Oct. 16–19	(Russia) Evgeniy Arkhipov	(Switzerland) Kevin Wunderlin
9	Challenge Chateau Cartier de Gatineau; Gatineau, Quebec, Oct. 22–26	(Manitoba) Mike McEwen	(Quebec) Jean-Michel Ménard
9	Curling Masters Champéry; Champéry, Switzerland, Oct. 24–26	(Scotland) Tom Brewster	(Switzerland) Marc Pfister
9	Bernick's Miller Lite Open; Bemidji, Minnesota, Oct. 25–27	(Minnesota) Korey Dropkin	(Ontario) Al Hackner
9	McKee Homes Fall Curling Classic; Airdrie, Alberta, Oct. 24–26	(Alberta) Aaron Sluchinski	(Alberta) Cam Culp
9	Moose Jaw Cash Spiel; Moose Jaw, Saskatchewan, Oct. 24–26	(Saskatchewan) Brent Gedak	(Saskatchewan) Jamie Schneider
10	**The Masters Grand Slam of Curling**; Selkirk, Manitoba, Oct. 28 – Nov. 2	(Newfoundland and Labrador) Brad Gushue	(Manitoba) Mike McEwen
10	Dave Jones Molson Mayflower Cashspiel; Halifax, Nova Scotia, Oct. 31 – Nov. 2	(Nova Scotia) Mike Flemming	(Prince Edward Island) Adam Casey
10	Shamrock Shotgun; Edmonton, Alberta, Oct. 31 – Nov. 2	(Alberta) Mick Lizmore	(Alberta) Robert Schlender
10	Swift Current Cash Spiel; Swift Current, Saskatchewan, Oct. 31 – Nov. 2	(Saskatchewan) Josh Heidt	(Saskatchewan) Chris Haichert
11	Whites Drug Store Classic; Swan River, Manitoba, Nov. 7–10	(Manitoba) Jeff Stoughton	(Scotland) David Murdoch
11	Original 16 WCT Bonspiel; Calgary, Alberta, Nov. 7–9	(Alberta) Brock Virtue	(Alberta) Robert Schlender
11	Edinburgh International; Edinburgh, Scotland, Nov. 7–9	(Finland) Aku Kauste	(Czech Republic) David Šik
11	Coronation Business Group Classic; Maple Ridge, British Columbia, Nov. 7–10	(British Columbia) Neil Dangerfield	(British Columbia) Sebastien Robillard
11	CookstownCash presented by Comco Canada Inc. Cookstown, Ontario, Nov. 6–9	(Ontario) Pat Ferris	(Prince Edward Island) Adam Casey
12	Red Deer Curling Classic; Red Deer, Alberta, Nov. 14–17	(Saskatchewan) Josh Heidt	(Alberta) Brendan Bottcher
12	Dauphin Clinic Pharmacy Classic; Dauphin, Manitoba, Nov. 14–17	(Saskatchewan) Randy Bryden	(Manitoba) Scott Ramsay
12	Gord Carroll Curling Classic; Whitby, Ontario, Nov. 13–16	(Ontario) John Epping	(Ontario) Chris Gardner
12	Copenhagen International; Hvidovre, Denmark, Nov. 14–16	(Switzerland) Stefan Stähli	(Denmark) Bo Jensen
13	**The National**; Sault Ste. Marie, Ontario, Nov. 19–23	(Manitoba) Mike McEwen	(Ontario) Brad Jacobs
13	DEKALB Superspiel; Morris, Manitoba, Nov. 20–24	(Manitoba) Matt Dunstone	(Manitoba) Scott Ramsay
13	Vancouver Island Shootout; Vancouver, British Columbia, Nov. 21–23	(British Columbia) Dean Joanisse	(British Columbia) Sean Geall
13	Spruce Grove Cashspiel; Spruce Grove, Alberta, Nov. 21–23	(South Korea) Kim Seung Min	(Alberta) Mike Hutchings
14	Challenge Casino de Charlevoix; Clermont, Quebec, Nov. 27–30	(Quebec) Jean-Michel Ménard	(Ontario) Don Bowser
14	Weatherford Curling Classic; Estevan, Saskatchewan, Nov. 28 – Dec. 1	(Saskatchewan) Steve Laycock	(British Columbia) Brent Pierce
14	Coors Light Cash Spiel; Duluth, Minnesota, Nov. 28–30	(Minnesota) Heath McCormick	(Ontario) Al Hackner
14	The Sunova Spiel at East St. Paul; Winnipeg, Manitoba, Nov. 28 – Dec. 1	(Manitoba) Sean Grassie	(Manitoba) Ryan Bay
14	Black Diamond/High River Cash; Black Diamond/High River, Alberta, Nov. 28 – 30	(Alberta) Brock Virtue	(South Korea) Kim Seung Min
15	Jim Sullivan Curling Classic; Saint John, New Brunswick, Dec. 5–7	(New Brunswick) Wayne Tallon	(New Brunswick) Jeremy Mallais
16	**Canadian Open of Curling**; Yorkton, Saskatchewan, Dec. 10–14	(Newfoundland and Labrador) Brad Gushue	(Saskatchewan) Steve Laycock
16	Truro Cash Spiel; Truro, Nova Scotia, Dec. 11–14	(Nova Scotia) Jamie Murphy	(New Brunswick) Mike Kennedy
16	BV Inn Curling Classic; Humboldt, Saskatchewan, Dec. 12–14	(Saskatchewan) Drew Heidt	(Saskatchewan) Jason Ackerman
17	Karuizawa International Curling Championship; Karuizawa, Japan, Dec. 18–21	(Alberta) Kevin Koe	(South Korea) Seong Se Hyeon
17	Curl Mesabi Classic; Eveleth, Minnesota, Dec. 19–21	(Minnesota) Mike Farbelow	(Ontario) Al Hackner
17	Dumfries Curling Challenge; Dumfries, Scotland, Dec. 19–21	(Scotland) Tom Brewster	(Scotland) Kyle Smith
19	U.S. Open of Curling; Blaine, Minnesota, Jan. 2–4	(Saskatchewan) Steve Laycock	(Manitoba) Reid Carruthers
19	Saskatchewan Players' Championship; North Battleford, Saskatchewan, Jan. 2–4	(Saskatchewan) Kevin Marsh	(Saskatchewan) Jason Ackerman
20	Mercure Perth Masters; Perth, Scotland, Jan. 8–11	(Canada) Brad Gushue	(Scotland) Kyle Smith
22	German Masters; Hamburg, Germany, Jan. 23–25	(Canada) Brendan Bottcher	(Switzerland) Sven Michel
23	Red Square Classic; Moscow, Russia, Jan. 29 – Feb. 2	(Russia) Alexander Krushelnitsky	(United States) Craig Brown
29	Pomeroy Inn & Suites Prairie Showdown; Grande Prairie, Alberta, Mar. 12–15	(Manitoba) Mike McEwen	(Sweden) Niklas Edin
30	**Elite 10**; Fort McMurray, Alberta, Mar. 18–22	(Manitoba) Mike McEwen	(Sweden) Niklas Edin
33	**The Players' Championship**; Toronto, Ontario, Apr. 7–12	(Ontario) Brad Jacobs	(Manitoba) Mike McEwen
34	European Masters; St. Gallen, Switzerland, Apr. 15–18	(Sweden) Niklas Edin	(Scotland) Kyle Smith

=== Women's events ===
Week	Event	Winning skip	Runner-up skip
2	StuSells Oakville Tankard; Oakville, Ontario, Sep. 4–7	(Switzerland) Silvana Tirinzoni	(Switzerland) Alina Pätz
3	HDF Insurance Shoot-Out; Edmonton, Alberta, Sep. 11–14	(Alberta) Chelsea Carey	(Alberta) Valerie Sweeting
4	AMJ Campbell Shorty Jenkins Classic; Brockville, Ontario, Sep. 18–21	(Ontario) Sherry Middaugh	(Scotland) Eve Muirhead
4	Cloverdale Cash Spiel; Surrey, British Columbia, Sep. 19–21	(China) Liu Sijia	(British Columbia) Sarah Wark
5	Stockholm Ladies Cup; Stockholm, Sweden, Sep. 26–28	(Sweden) Margaretha Sigfridsson	(Ontario) Rachel Homan
5	KW Fall Classic; Kitchener-Waterloo, Ontario, Sep. 25–28	(Ontario) Julie Hastings	(Ontario) Jacqueline Harrison
5	Mother Club Fall Curling Classic; Winnipeg, Manitoba, Sep. 25–28	(Manitoba) Kristy McDonald	(Manitoba) Colleen Kilgallen
5	Gibson's Cashspiel; Lower Sackville, Nova Scotia, Sep. 25–28	(Nova Scotia) Mary-Anne Arsenault	(Nova Scotia) Mary Fay
6	Prestige Hotels & Resorts Curling Classic; Vernon, British Columbia, Oct. 3–6	(Japan) Ayumi Ogasawara	(Alberta) Valerie Sweeting
6	Avonair Cash Spiel; Edmonton, Alberta, Oct. 3–5	(Japan) Mari Motohashi	(Alberta) Tiffany Game
7	**Curlers Corner Autumn Gold Curling Classic**; Calgary, Alberta, Oct. 10–13	(Manitoba) Jennifer Jones	(Ontario) Rachel Homan
7	Women's Masters Basel; Basel, Switzerland, Oct. 10–12	(Switzerland) Binia Feltscher	(Switzerland) Silvana Tirinzoni
7	St. Paul Cash Spiel; St. Paul, Minnesota, Oct. 10–12	(United States) Aileen Sormunen	(Wisconsin) Debbie McCormick
7	Skyy Vodka Ladies Cashspiel; Halifax, Nova Scotia, Oct. 10–13	(Nova Scotia) Emily Dwyer	(Nova Scotia) Mary-Anne Arsenault
8	Kamloops Crown of Curling; Kamloops, British Columbia, Oct. 17–20	(Japan) Ayumi Ogasawara	(British Columbia) Kelly Scott
8	Medicine Hat Charity Classic; Medicine Hat, Alberta, Oct. 17–20	(Alberta) Casey Scheidegger	(Saskatchewan) Brett Barber
8	Atkins Curling Supplies Women's Classic; Winnipeg, Manitoba, Oct. 16–20	(Ontario) Janet Harvey	(Manitoba) Colleen Kilgallen
8	Stroud Sleeman Cash Spiel; Stroud, Ontario, Oct. 16–19	(Ontario) Julie Hastings	(Ontario) Sherry Middaugh
9	Canad Inns Women's Classic; Portage la Prairie, Manitoba, Oct. 24–27	(Manitoba) Jennifer Jones	(Manitoba) Jill Thurston
9	Crestwood Ladies Fall Classic; Edmonton, Alberta, Oct. 24–26	(South Korea) Gim Un-chi	(Alberta) Nicky Kaufman
10	**The Masters Grand Slam of Curling**; Selkirk, Manitoba, Oct. 28 – Nov. 2	(Alberta) Valerie Sweeting	(Sweden) Margaretha Sigfridsson
10	Shamrock Shotgun; Edmonton, Alberta, Oct. 31 – Nov. 2	(Alberta) Nicky Kaufman	(Switzerland) Michèle Jäggi
10	Dave Jones Molson Mayflower Cashspiel; Halifax, Nova Scotia, Oct. 31 – Nov. 2	(Nova Scotia) Mary-Anne Arsenault	(Prince Edward Island) Kathy O'Rourke
11	**Colonial Square Ladies Classic**; Saskatoon, Saskatchewan, Nov. 7–10	(Scotland) Eve Muirhead	(Ontario) Sherry Middaugh
11	Royal LePage OVCA Women's Fall Classic; Kemptville, Ontario, Nov. 6–9	(Ontario) Cathy Auld	(Ontario) Julie Hastings
11	Coronation Business Group Classic; Maple Ridge, British Columbia, Nov. 7–10	(British Columbia) Corryn Brown	(British Columbia) Kelly Scott
11	CookstownCash presented by Comco Canada Inc. Cookstown, Ontario, Nov. 7–9	(New York (state)) Patti Lank	(Ontario) Marilyn Bodogh
12	Red Deer Curling Classic; Red Deer, Alberta, Nov. 14–17	(Switzerland) Alina Pätz	(Saskatchewan) Trish Paulsen
12	International ZO Women's Tournament; Wetzikon, Switzerland, Nov. 14–16	(Russia) Anna Sidorova	(Switzerland) Briar Hürlimann
12	Gord Carroll Curling Classic; Whitby, Ontario, Nov. 13–16	(Ontario) Susan McKnight	(Ontario) Sherry Middaugh
13	DEKALB Superspiel; Morris, Manitoba, Nov. 20–24	(Ontario) Tracy Horgan	(Manitoba) Jennifer Jones
13	Vancouver Island Shootout; Vancouver, British Columbia, Nov. 21–23	(British Columbia) Sarah Wark	(British Columbia) Diane Gushulak
13	Spruce Grove Cashspiel; Spruce Grove, Alberta, Nov. 21–23	(Alberta) Shannon Kleibrink	(Alberta) Heather Nedohin
14	Boundary Ford Curling Classic; Lloydminster, Alberta, Nov. 28 – Dec. 1	(Alberta) Chelsea Carey	(Saskatchewan) Jolene Campbell
14	Molson Cash Spiel; Duluth, Minnesota, Nov. 28–30	(Minnesota) Cory Christensen	(Ontario) Kendra Lilly
14	The Sunova Spiel at East St. Paul; Winnipeg, Manitoba, Nov. 28 – Dec. 1	(Manitoba) Michelle Montford	(Manitoba) Barb Spencer
16	**Canadian Open of Curling**; Yorkton, Saskatchewan, Dec. 9–14	(Scotland) Eve Muirhead	(Ontario) Rachel Homan
17	Karuizawa International Curling Championship; Karuizawa, Japan, Dec. 18–21	(Manitoba) Jennifer Jones	(South Korea) Kim Eun-jung
17	Curl Mesabi Classic; Eveleth, Minnesota, Dec. 19–21	(Ontario) Tracy Horgan	(Wisconsin) Erika Brown
17	Dumfries Curling Challenge; Dumfries, Scotland, Dec. 19–21	(Switzerland) Melanie Barbezat	(Scotland) Gina Aitken
20	International Bernese Ladies Cup; Bern, Switzerland, Jan. 8–11	(Switzerland) Alina Pätz	(Switzerland) Silvana Tirinzoni
21	Glynhill Ladies International; Glasgow, Scotland, Jan. 16–18	(Russia) Anna Sidorova	(South Korea) Kim Eun-jung
29	Pomeroy Inn & Suites Prairie Showdown; Grande Prairie, Alberta, Mar. 12–15	(Ontario) Rachel Homan	(Switzerland) Silvana Tirinzoni
33	**The Players' Championship**; Toronto, Ontario, Apr. 7–12	(Scotland) Eve Muirhead	(Russia) Anna Sidorova

== WCT Order of Merit rankings ==
Men

Standings after Week 22
#	Skip	Points
1	(Manitoba) Mike McEwen	472.410
2	(Ontario) Brad Jacobs	446.000
3	(Newfoundland and Labrador) Brad Gushue	357.083
4	(Alberta) Kevin Koe	260.375
5	(Norway) Thomas Ulsrud	246.925
6	(Ontario) Glenn Howard	238.750
7	(Sweden) Niklas Edin	229.024
8	(Saskatchewan) Steve Laycock	227.270
9	(Alberta) John Morris	226.195
10	(Ontario) John Epping	192.519

Women

Standings after Week 22
#	Skip	Points
1	(Manitoba) Jennifer Jones	431.285
2	(Scotland) Eve Muirhead	334.757
3	(Ontario) Rachel Homan	333.154
4	(Switzerland) Silvana Tirinzoni	261.055
5	(Alberta) Valerie Sweeting	251.918
6	(Switzerland) Binia Feltscher	247.060
7	(Sweden) Margaretha Sigfridsson	246.345
8	(Russia) Anna Sidorova	223.885
9	(Ontario) Sherry Middaugh	203.090
10	(Switzerland) Alina Pätz	158.919

== WCT Money List ==
Men

Final standings
#	Skip	$ (CAD)
1	(Manitoba) Mike McEwen	$172,500
2	(Ontario) Brad Jacobs	$107,500
3	(Newfoundland and Labrador) Brad Gushue	$103,798
4	(Alberta) Kevin Koe	$86,701
5	(Alberta) Brendan Bottcher	$71,722
6	(Saskatchewan) Steve Laycock	$65,766
7	(Sweden) Niklas Edin	$56,468
8	(Manitoba) Reid Carruthers	$54,523
9	(Ontario) John Epping	$53,250
10	(Ontario) Glenn Howard	$51,100

Women

Final standings
#	Skip	$ (CAD)
1	(Ontario) Rachel Homan	$91,608
2	(Alberta) Valerie Sweeting	$87,950
3	(Scotland) Eve Muirhead	$77,000
4	(Manitoba) Jennifer Jones	$74,355
5	(Alberta) Heather Nedohin	$47,750
6	(Switzerland) Silvana Tirinzoni	$47,473
7	(Switzerland) Alina Pätz	$39,077
8	(Ontario) Sherry Middaugh	$38,635
9	(Russia) Anna Sidorova	$38,447
10	(Switzerland) Binia Feltscher	$36,273

== Curling Canada MA Cup ==
The MA Cup is awarded to the Curling Canada Member Association (MA) who has had the most success during the season in Curling Canada-sanctioned events. Events included the Canadian mixed championship, men's and women's juniors championships, the Scotties, the Brier, the men's and women's senior championships and the national wheelchair championship. Points were awarded based on placement in each of the events, with the top association receiving 14 points and each association under receiving points in decrements of one point.

=== Standings ===
Final standings

Rank	Member Association	CMCC	CWJCC	CMJCC	Scotties	Brier	CWSCC	CMSCC	CWhCC	Total Pts.	Avg. Pts.
1	Saskatchewan	14	9	13	11	12	11	7	11	88	11.000
2	Alberta	6	14	10	13	10	14	11	9	87	10.875
3	Manitoba	8	10	14	14	5	9	14	12	86	10.750
4	British Columbia	11	12	8	3	8	12	8	14	76	9.500
5	Ontario	12	13	7	9	7	6	10	10	74	9.250
6	Quebec	9	7	11	4	9	7	13	13	73	9.125
7	Northern Ontario	10	3	9	10	13	10	5	7	67	8.375
8	Nova Scotia	7	11	5	8	1	13	9	5	59	7.375
9	New Brunswick	4	8	12	5	4	5	12	6	56	7.000
10	Newfoundland and Labrador	2	2	4	7	11	8	3	8	45	5.625
11	Prince Edward Island	3	6	6	6	6	3	6	N/A	36	5.143
12	Northwest Territories	13	5	2	2	3	4	4	N/A	33	4.714
13	Yukon	5	4	3	1	2	N/A	1	N/A	16	2.667
14	Nunavut	1	1	1	N/A	N/A	2	2	N/A	7	1.400

== Notes ==
Preceded by 2013–14	2014–15 curling season August 2014 – May 2015	Succeeded by 2015–16
