= Buckingham High School =

Coordinates: 45.5821°N 75.4225°W

Buckingham High School (known as BHSH, Buckingham High, or just the High School) was an English Protestant public school located on George Street (rue Georges) in the town of Buckingham, Quebec (now the Buckingham section of Gatineau Quebec).

BHS was built in 1947 on nine acres of land donated by the Albert MacLaren Estate. The school would officially open on November 7, 1947 and enrolled 230 students its first year. BHS was administered by the Papineau Protestant Central School Board. The school would graduate more than 300 students over its 21-year history.

When BHS opened, it was considered to be as modern as any school in Quebec. It boasted spacious classrooms, administrative offices, a nurse's room, an auditorium, a library, a music room, a laboratory for chemistry and physics classes, an industrial arts workshop, a home economics room, and separate girls' and boys' play rooms. The school auditorium was unusually well appointed. It included a balcony and a professionally equipped stage, complete with drop curtains, overhead lighting, and sunken footlights. The school's colors were blue and white and the school team was named "The Larks".

To accommodate growth in the student population, BHS underwent two expansions. In 1962, three classrooms and lunchroom were added. In 1964, three more classrooms were added.

Buckingham High School offered Grades 1 to Grade 11 (junior matriculation) and drew its students from a wide area. Originally, students came from Buckingham and Masson (Masson-Angers, Quebec) as well as from farms and rural homes east and west of the Lièvre (Du Lièvre River) River (The Inlet, Long Lake, Mayo, (Mayo, Quebec), Silver Creek, Glen Almond, Donaldson Lake, etc.).

Over the years the school would grow into a regional education center. By the early 1960s students from Thurso, Quebec and Montebello, Quebec were being bussed to BHS for Grades 10 and 11. The school also included students from small communities like Poltimore, Namur, Quebec, Val-des-Bois, Quebec, and Notre-Dame-du-Laus, Quebec. Enrollment would peak at about 400 students. Typically there were about 120 high school students at BHS, including 10 to 20 students in the graduating class.

Buckingham High School had three long term Principals – J.C. (Clifford) Moore, the school's founding Principal (1947 – 1957), K.J. (Keith) Dowd (1958 – 1962), and C.A. (Clyde) MacTavish (1964 – 1967). Moore is credited with creating an educational culture that made BHS a well rounded and enjoyable school to attend. Dowd's achievements include the coining of the school's motto (No Reward Without Work) and establishing an academic regime that let the school cope successfully with the prevailing departmental examinations. (As someone who attended the school when the school's motto was coined, my clear recollection is that we had a competition to decide what the motto would be and Mr. Dowd made the choice. The motto was coined by James Belisle.) MacTavish is remembered for solving the discipline challenge that BHS faced in a manner that let the school become a civil place to teach and learn.

In the late 1940s and early 1950s Buckingham High School established a modus operandi that would prove surprisingly constant during its 21-year history.

School days at BHS were bracketed by school bus arrivals and departures. Buses arrived at 8:45 and classes began at 9:00 (the line up bell sounded at 8:50). School was dismissed at 3:45 and buses left the school at 4:00. In the winter it was not unusual for rural students to have to ski to bus stops. No matter what the weather might be, school buses almost always ran. The school had very few "snow days".

The curriculum at Buckingham High School was collegiate in nature. Course offerings were limited – mathematics (algebra, geometry & trigonometry), English, French, science (physics & chemistry), as well as history and geography. Latin was offered in the 1950s but this course was dropped due to insufficient enrolment. There were no optional courses beyond high school industrial arts for the boys and home economics for the girls. In the early sixties two additional courses were added to the school program for graduating Grade 11 students – North American Literature and a Grade 12 mathematics course, Intermediate Algebra.

Students at BHS faced standardized provincial Departmental examinations in Grade 7 and in Grades 10 and 11. The Grade 7 and Grade 10 exams were set provincially but were marked by the high school's teachers using provincially supplied marking keys. The Grade 11 exams were set and marked in Quebec City.

In 1968, Buckingham High School was closed and students attending the high school were transferred to Philemon Wright High School in the Hull section of Gatineau, Quebec.

Today the old Buckingham High School building is still in use. The school is now called Buckingham Elementary School. It serves English elementary school students from Pre-Kindergarten (4 year olds) to Cycle 3, Year 2 students (formerly known as Grade 6) and is administered by the Western Québec School Board.
