= 2011 Challenge Casino Lac Leamy =

- Host city: Buckingham, Quebec
- Arena: Buckingham Curling Club
- Dates: October 21 – 23
- Men's winner: (Quebec) Jean-Michel Ménard
- Curling club: CC Etchemin; Saint-Romuald, Quebec
- Skip: Jean-Michel Ménard
- Third: Martin Crête
- Second: Éric Sylvain
- Lead: Philippe Ménard
- Finalist: (Ontario) Brad Jacobs
- Women's winner: (Ontario) Jenn Hanna
- Curling club: Ottawa CC, Ottawa, Ontario
- Skip: Jenn Hanna
- Third: Pascale Letendre
- Second: Stephanie Hanna
- Lead: Trish Scharf
- Finalist: (Quebec) Marie-France Larouche

The 2011 Challenge Casino Lac Leamy was held from October 21 to 23 at the Buckingham Curling Club in Buckingham, Quebec as part of the 2011–12 World Curling Tour. This is the first time a women's event was held. The purses for the men's and women's were CAD$36,500 and CAD$11,000, respectively.

== Men ==
=== Playoffs ===
Quarterfinals
(Quebec) Robert Desjardins	4
(Ontario) Robert Rumfeldt	6
(Ontario) Brad Jacobs	5
(Newfoundland and Labrador) Brad Gushue	4
(Ontario) Mark Kean	6
(Prince Edward Island) Brett Gallant	5
(Quebec) Jean-Michel Ménard	7
(Quebec) Pierre Charette	3

Semifinals
(Ontario) Robert Rumfeldt	2
(Ontario) Brad Jacobs	7
(Ontario) Mark Kean	3
(Quebec) Jean-Michel Ménard	5

Finals
(Ontario) Brad Jacobs	6
(Quebec) Jean-Michel Ménard	7

== Women ==
=== Playoffs ===
Quarterfinals
(Quebec) Julie Hamel	2
(Quebec) Roxane Perron	4
(Nova Scotia) Kelly MacIntosh	6
(Quebec) Sian Canavan	2

Semifinals
(Ontario) Jenn Hanna	4
(Quebec) Roxane Perron	3
(Quebec) Marie-France Larouche	6
(Nova Scotia) Kelly MacIntosh	0

Final
(Ontario) Jenn Hanna	8
(Quebec) Marie-France Larouche	7
