= Challenge de Curling de Gatineau =

World Curling Tour event in Canada

Location in Canada

The Challenge de Curling de Gatineau (formerly the Challenge Chateau Cartier de Gatineau and the Challenge Casino Lac Leamy) is an annual bonspiel, or curling tournament, on the World Curling Tour. It is held annually in late October in the City of Gatineau, Quebec. The men's tournament was started in 2009, while the women's tournament was started in 2011, but discontinued after 2013.

Beginning in 2011, the event shifted venues to the Centre Sportif Robert Rochon in Masson, Quebec in the Masson-Angers sector of the city and the Buckingham Curling Club in the Buckingham sector.

== Past champions ==
Only skip's name is displayed.

=== Men ===
Year	Winning team	Runner up team	Purse (CAD)
2009	(Quebec) Jean-Michel Ménard	(Ontario) Neil Sinclair	$31,000
2010	(Quebec) Serge Reid	(Quebec) Jean-Michel Ménard	$37,500
2011	(Quebec) Jean-Michel Ménard	(Ontario) Brad Jacobs	$36,500
2012	(Nova Scotia) Mark Dacey	(Newfoundland and Labrador) Brad Gushue	$36,500
2013	(Newfoundland and Labrador) Brad Gushue	(Ontario) Robert Rumfeldt	$45,400
2014	(Manitoba) Mike McEwen	(Quebec) Jean-Michel Ménard	$42,500
2015	(Newfoundland and Labrador) Brad Gushue	(Ontario) Mark Bice	$45,000
2016	(Ontario) John Epping	(Manitoba) Matt Dunstone	$45,000
2017	(China) Liu Rui	(Switzerland) Peter de Cruz	$41,000
2018	(Ontario) Scott McDonald	(Ontario) Charley Thomas	$37,000

=== Women ===
Year	Winning team	Runner up team	Purse (CAD)
2011	(Ontario) Jenn Hanna	(Quebec) Marie-France Larouche	$11,000
2012	(Ontario) Julie Reddick	(Ontario) Cathy Auld	$13,000
2013	(Ontario) Lisa Farnell	(Ontario) Katie Morrissey	$15,000

=== Open ===
The open event is part of the Ontario Curling Tour only and is open to teams with men and women.

Year	Winning team	Runner up team	Purse (CAD)
2015	(Quebec) Roger Bertrand	(Quebec) Steven Munroe	$10,500
2016	(Israel) Adam Freilich	(Ontario) Colin Dow	$12,850
2017	(Quebec) Sylvain Dicaire	(Ontario) Brian Lewis	$12,850
2018	(Ontario) Colin Dow	(Quebec) Noemie Verreault	$13,300

== Past events ==
=== 2009 event ===
Former Brier champion Jean-Michel Ménard defeated 2007 Canada Games curling silver medalist Neil Sinclair to win $8,000 for his team. The total pot was $31,000.

==== Playoffs ====
Quarterfinals
(Ontario) Neil Sinclair	7
(Quebec) Ted Butler	6
(Ontario) Howard Rajala	5
(Ontario) Brad Jacobs	4
(Quebec) Martin Ferland	8
(Ontario) Jake Higgs	5
(Quebec) Jean-Michel Ménard	7
(Quebec) Serge Reid	4

Semifinals
(Ontario) Neil Sinclair	7
(Ontario) Howard Rajala	2
(Quebec) Martin Ferland	3
(Quebec) Jean-Michel Ménard	8

Finals
(Ontario) Neil Sinclair	3
(Quebec) Jean-Michel Ménard	7

=== 2010 event ===
The total purse of the 2010 event is $37,500. The winner, Serge Reid, upset defending championship Jean-Michel Ménard and earned the right to play at the 2010 Canada Cup of Curling.

==== Playoffs ====
Quarterfinals
(Ontario) Mark Bice	2
(Ontario) Howard Rajala	5
(Quebec) Serge Reid	6
(Ontario) Wayne Tuck, Jr.	5
(Quebec) Jean-Michel Ménard	5
(Ontario) Brad Jacobs	4
(Newfoundland and Labrador) Brad Gushue	2
(Quebec) Michael Fournier	4

Semifinals
(Ontario) Howard Rajala	3
(Quebec) Serge Reid	7
(Quebec) Jean-Michel Ménard	6
(Quebec) Michael Fournier	5

Finals
(Quebec) Serge Reid	5
(Quebec) Jean-Michel Ménard	4
