= École secondaire Hormisdas-Gamelin =

Coordinates: 45°35′13″N 75°24′0″W

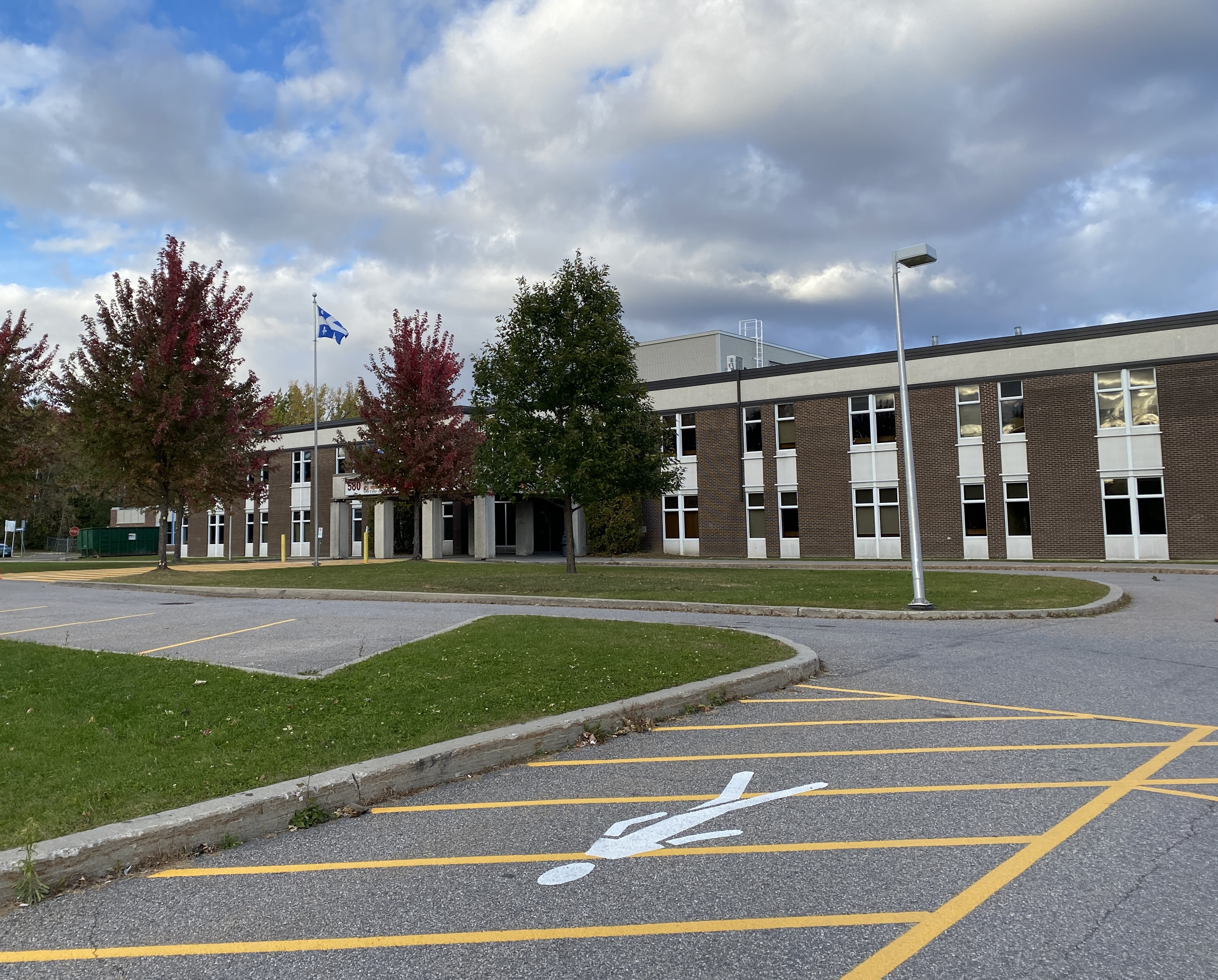

Location
- 580, rue Maclaren Est; Gatineau, Quebec, J8L 2W2; Canada

Information
- School type: High school
- School board: Commission Scolaire au Coeur-des-Vallées
- Principal: Denis Pacheco (2023)
- Grades: Secondary 1-5
- Language: French
- Website: eshg.csscv.gouv.qc.ca

École secondaire Hormisdas-Gamelin is a public francophone high school located in the city of Gatineau, Quebec. It is located in the east end of the city in the Buckingham sector on MacLaren Street. It is operated by the Centre de services scolaire au Cœur-des-Vallées which operates institutions in the Buckingham area as well as in the Papineau region of the Outaouais.

The school is home to an international program to more skilled students. The program's goal is to initiate schools to be more open and informed about the worldwide realities and cultures. There also additional specific formation programs called voies in which students can have specific courses in some domains including sports, sciences, arts or citizen, environment and visual arts.

The school's football team is called the Tigers.
