= 2015 Canadian Senior Curling Championships – Men's tournament =

2015 Canadian Senior Curling Championships Men's tournament
- Host city: Edmonton, Alberta
- Arena: Thistle Curling Club
- Dates: March 21–28
- Winner: Manitoba
- Curling club: La Salle CC, La Salle
- Skip: Randy Neufeld
- Third: Dean Moxham
- Second: Peter Nicholls
- Lead: Dale Michie
- Finalist: Quebec (Ted Butler)

The men's tournament of the 2015 Canadian Senior Curling Championships was held from March 21 to 28 at the Thistle Curling Club in Edmonton, Alberta. The winners represented Canada at the 2016 World Senior Curling Championships.

== Teams ==
Province / Territory	Skip	Third	Second	Lead
Alberta	Glen Hansen	Doug McLennan	George Parsons	Don Bartlett
British Columbia	Wes Craig	Scott MacDonald	Tony Anslow	Lindsay Cheetham
Manitoba	Randy Neufeld	Dean Moxham	Peter Nicholls	Michie Dale
New Brunswick	Mike Kennedy	Wayne Tallon (skip)	Mike Flannery	Wade Blanchard
Newfoundland and Labrador	Glenn Goss	Gary Oke	Blair Fradsham	Dennis Bruce
Northern Ontario	Al Hackner	Eric Harnden	Frank Morrisette	Rob Thomas
Northwest Territories	Glen Hudy	Brian Kelln	Ben McDonald	Richard Klakowich
Nova Scotia	Wayne Sangster	Phil Redden	Peter Neily	James Barr
Nunavut	Ed Sattelberg	Denis Masson	Monty LeComte	Lloyd Kendall
Ontario	Jeff McCrady	Brian Lewis	Graham Sinclair	Mike Johansen
Prince Edward Island	Rod MacDonald	Kevin Champion	Blair Weeks	Mark Victor
Quebec	Ted Butler	Don Westphal	Maurice Cayouette	Michel Laroche
Saskatchewan	Peter Thiele	Dwayne Mihalicz	Brad Law	Glen Despins (skip)
Yukon	Walter Wallingham	Gordon Zealand	Herb Balsam	Don Duncan

== Round-robin standings ==
=== Pool A ===
Province	Skip	W	L
Alberta	Glen Hansen	5	1
Nova Scotia	Wayne Sangster	4	2
Quebec	Ted Butler	4	2
Saskatchewan	Glen Despins	3	3
Northwest Territories	Glen Hudy	2	4
Northern Ontario	Al Hackner	2	4
Yukon	Walter Wallingham	1	5

=== Pool B ===
Province	Skip	W	L
Manitoba	Randy Neufeld	5	1
Ontario	Jeff McCrady	5	1
New Brunswick	Wayne Tallon	4	2
British Columbia	Wes Craig	3	3
Newfoundland and Labrador	Glenn Goss	2	4
Prince Edward Island	Rod MacDonald	2	4
Nunavut	Ed Sattelberg	0	6

== Round-robin results ==
=== Pool A ===
==== Draw 2 ====
Sheet A	1	2	3	4	5	6	7	8	Final
Northern Ontario (Hackner)	0	2	0	2	0	0	X	X	4
Alberta (Hansen)	2	0	2	0	2	3	X	X	9

Sheet C	1	2	3	4	5	6	7	8	Final
Yukon (Wallingham)	2	0	0	0	0	0	2	X	4
Northwest Territories (Hudy)	0	1	1	2	1	3	0	X	8

Sheet E	1	2	3	4	5	6	7	8	Final
Nova Scotia (Sangster)	1	0	0	1	2	0	1	0	5
Saskatchewan (Despins)	0	2	1	0	0	3	0	2	8

==== Draw 4 ====
Sheet B	1	2	3	4	5	6	7	8	Final
Alberta (Hansen)	0	2	1	0	0	2	0	X	5
Quebec (Butler)	2	0	0	0	3	0	4	X	9

Sheet D	1	2	3	4	5	6	7	8	Final
Nova Scotia (Sangster)	2	0	1	0	3	0	1	X	7
Yukon (Wallingham)	0	1	0	1	0	0	0	X	2

Sheet F	1	2	3	4	5	6	7	8	Final
Saskatchewan (Despins)	0	0	5	1	0	0	2	X	8
Northwest Territories (Hudy)	1	1	0	0	1	2	0	X	5

==== Draw 6 ====
Sheet B	1	2	3	4	5	6	7	8	Final
Northwest Territories (Hudy)	1	0	0	3	0	4	0	1	9
Northern Ontario (Hackner)	0	1	1	0	1	0	3	0	6

Sheet D	1	2	3	4	5	6	7	8	Final
Saskatchewan (Despins)	0	0	0	1	0	0	0	1	2
Alberta (Hansen)	0	0	1	0	0	1	2	0	4

Sheet F	1	2	3	4	5	6	7	8	Final
Quebec (Butler)	0	0	0	1	0	1	0	X	2
Nova Scotia (Sangster)	0	3	0	0	2	0	3	X	8

==== Draw 8 ====
Sheet A	1	2	3	4	5	6	7	8	Final
Alberta (Hansen)	0	5	0	2	0	3	X	X	10
Yukon (Wallingham)	0	0	1	0	1	0	X	X	2

Sheet C	1	2	3	4	5	6	7	8	Final
Northwest Territories (Hudy)	0	0	0	0	1	1	X	X	2
Quebec (Butler)	1	1	1	4	0	0	X	X	7

Sheet E	1	2	3	4	5	6	7	8	Final
Northern Ontario (Hackner)	0	2	0	0	0	0	X	X	2
Nova Scotia (Sangster)	2	0	0	0	3	4	X	X	9

==== Draw 10 ====
Sheet A	1	2	3	4	5	6	7	8	9	Final
Nova Scotia (Sangster)	1	0	1	0	3	0	0	3	1	9
Northwest Territories (Hudy)	0	2	0	2	0	2	2	0	0	8

Sheet C	1	2	3	4	5	6	7	8	Final
Northern Ontario (Hackner)	0	0	1	0	0	1	X	X	2
Saskatchewan (Despins)	1	1	0	3	2	0	X	X	7

Sheet E	1	2	3	4	5	6	7	8	Final
Yukon (Wallingham)	0	4	0	0	0	2	0	X	6
Quebec (Butler)	2	0	3	1	1	0	3	X	10

==== Draw 12 ====
Sheet A	1	2	3	4	5	6	7	8	9	Final
Quebec (Butler)	0	1	1	0	0	2	3	0	1	8
Saskatchewan (Despins)	2	0	0	1	2	0	0	2	0	7

Sheet E	1	2	3	4	5	6	7	8	Final
Northwest Territories (Hudy)	0	0	3	0	1	0	1	0	5
Newfoundland and Labrador (Goss)	1	1	0	2	0	2	0	1	7

Sheet F	1	2	3	4	5	6	7	8	Final
Yukon (Wallingham)	0	0	2	0	1	0	0	X	3
Northern Ontario (Hackner)	0	2	0	2	0	1	1	X	6

==== Draw 14 ====
Sheet B	1	2	3	4	5	6	7	8	Final
Saskatchewan (Despins)	0	0	0	0	3	0	X	X	3
Yukon (Wallingham)	0	2	1	2	0	3	X	X	8

Sheet C	1	2	3	4	5	6	7	8	9	Final
Alberta (Hansen)	0	1	0	1	0	1	2	0	1	6
Nova Scotia (Sangster)	0	0	2	0	2	0	0	1	0	5

Sheet D	1	2	3	4	5	6	7	8	Final
Quebec (Butler)	0	2	1	1	0	0	2	0	6
Northern Ontario (Hackner)	3	0	0	0	1	2	0	1	7

=== Pool B ===
==== Draw 2 ====
Sheet B	1	2	3	4	5	6	7	8	Final
Newfoundland and Labrador (Goss)	0	1	0	0	0	0	X	X	1
Manitoba (Neufeld)	1	0	0	2	1	3	X	X	7

Sheet D	1	2	3	4	5	6	7	8	Final
Prince Edward Island (MacDonald)	1	0	0	1	1	0	1	0	4
British Columbia (Craig)	0	2	1	0	0	1	0	1	5

Sheet F	1	2	3	4	5	6	7	8	Final
New Brunswick (Tallon)	0	2	0	2	1	0	1	X	6
Nunavut (Sattelberg)	0	0	1	0	0	1	0	X	2

==== Draw 4 ====
Sheet A	1	2	3	4	5	6	7	8	Final
Ontario (McCrady)	0	0	1	1	1	1	0	2	6
Newfoundland and Labrador (Goss)	2	1	0	0	0	0	1	0	4

Sheet C	1	2	3	4	5	6	7	8	Final
Prince Edward Island (MacDonald)	2	1	0	1	0	2	2	X	8
New Brunswick (Tallon)	0	0	2	0	1	0	0	X	3

Sheet E	1	2	3	4	5	6	7	8	Final
British Columbia (Craig)	2	1	1	0	0	0	0	1	5
Nunavut (Sattelberg)	0	0	0	2	1	0	1	0	4

==== Draw 6 ====
Sheet A	1	2	3	4	5	6	7	8	Final
Manitoba (Neufeld)	2	1	1	0	0	3	X	X	7
Prince Edward Island (MacDonald)	0	0	0	2	0	0	X	X	2

Sheet C	1	2	3	4	5	6	7	8	Final
Nunavut (Sattelberg)	2	0	0	0	1	0	X	X	3
Ontario (McCrady)	0	4	2	0	0	4	X	X	10

Sheet E	1	2	3	4	5	6	7	8	Final
Newfoundland and Labrador (Goss)	0	0	0	1	0	0	1	X	2
New Brunswick (Tallon)	2	1	0	0	1	2	0	X	6

==== Draw 8 ====
Sheet B	1	2	3	4	5	6	7	8	Final
Prince Edward Island (MacDonald)	3	0	1	0	0	2	0	X	6
Nunavut (Sattelberg)	0	1	0	0	1	0	1	X	3

Sheet D	1	2	3	4	5	6	7	8	Final
New Brunswick (Tallon)	1	0	2	0	0	3	2	X	8
Manitoba (Neufeld)	0	1	0	2	0	0	0	X	3

Sheet F	1	2	3	4	5	6	7	8	Final
Ontario (McCrady)	0	2	1	1	2	1	X	X	7
British Columbia (Craig)	1	0	0	0	0	0	X	X	1

==== Draw 10 ====
Sheet B	1	2	3	4	5	6	7	8	Final
British Columbia (Craig)	1	1	0	0	2	0	1	3	8
Newfoundland and Labrador (Goss)	0	0	1	1	0	2	0	0	4

Sheet D	1	2	3	4	5	6	7	8	Final
Ontario (McCrady)	1	1	2	0	1	1	1	X	7
Prince Edward Island (MacDonald)	0	0	0	1	0	0	0	X	1

Sheet F	1	2	3	4	5	6	7	8	Final
Nunavut (Sattelberg)	0	1	0	0	2	0	0	X	3
Manitoba (Neufeld)	3	0	0	3	0	1	4	X	11

==== Draw 12 ====
Sheet B	1	2	3	4	5	6	7	8	Final
New Brunswick (Tallon)	0	1	0	0	1	0	2	0	4
Ontario (McCrady)	1	0	1	1	0	1	0	1	5

Sheet C	1	2	3	4	5	6	7	8	Final
Manitoba (Neufeld)	0	1	0	1	0	1	1	X	4
British Columbia (Craig)	0	0	1	0	1	0	0	X	2

Sheet D	1	2	3	4	5	6	7	8	Final
Nunavut (Sattelberg)	0	0	3	0	1	0	1	0	5
Newfoundland and Labrador (Goss)	1	1	0	2	0	2	0	1	7

==== Draw 14 ====
Sheet A	1	2	3	4	5	6	7	8	Final
British Columbia (Craig)	2	0	0	2	0	2	0	0	6
New Brunswick (Tallon)	0	2	1	0	2	0	2	1	8

Sheet E	1	2	3	4	5	6	7	8	Final
Manitoba (Neufeld)	2	0	2	0	0	2	0	3	9
Ontario (McCrady)	0	2	0	1	1	0	1	0	5

Sheet F	1	2	3	4	5	6	7	8	Final
Newfoundland and Labrador (Goss)	0	1	1	0	1	0	2	X	5
Prince Edward Island (MacDonald)	0	0	0	0	0	1	0	X	1

== Placement Round ==
=== Seeding Pool ===
==== Standings ====
After Round-robin standings

Province	Skip	W	L
Northern Ontario	Al Hackner	4	5
Northwest Territories	Glen Hudy	4	5
Prince Edward Island	Rod MacDonald	4	5
Newfoundland and Labrador	Glenn Goss	3	6
Nunavut	Ed Sattelberg	2	7
Yukon	Walter Wallingham	1	8

===== Draw 15 =====
Sheet E	1	2	3	4	5	6	7	8	Final
Northwest Territories (Hudy)	1	3	3	1	0	0	X	X	8
Newfoundland and Labrador (Goss)	0	0	0	0	1	0	X	X	1

Sheet F	1	2	3	4	5	6	7	8	Final
Prince Edward Island (MacDonald)	0	3	0	1	1	0	0	X	5
Northern Ontario (Hackner)	5	0	1	0	0	1	3	X	10

===== Draw 16 =====
Sheet B	1	2	3	4	5	6	7	8	Final
Yukon (Wallingham)	0	0	0	2	0	0	0	X	2
Nunavut (Sattelberg)	1	0	0	0	1	1	2	X	5

===== Draw 19 =====
Sheet B	1	2	3	4	5	6	7	8	Final
Northwest Territories (Hudy)	0	0	0	2	0	0	X	X	2
Prince Edward Island (MacDonald)	2	4	1	0	1	2	X	X	10

Sheet C	1	2	3	4	5	6	7	8	Final
Newfoundland and Labrador (Goss)	1	0	0	0	1	0	2	2	6
Yukon (Wallingham)	0	0	0	3	0	1	0	0	4

Sheet D	1	2	3	4	5	6	7	8	Final
Northern Ontario (Hackner)	0	3	0	1	0	1	0	X	5
Nunavut (Sattelberg)	3	0	3	0	2	0	2	X	10

===== Draw 22 =====
Sheet A	1	2	3	4	5	6	7	8	Final
Yukon (Wallingham)	0	1	0	1	0	0	0	0	2
Prince Edward Island (MacDonald)	2	0	0	0	0	1	1	1	5

Sheet B	1	2	3	4	5	6	7	8	Final
Northern Ontario (Hackner)	2	3	1	0	0	0	1	X	7
Newfoundland and Labrador (Goss)	0	0	0	1	1	1	0	X	3

Sheet C	1	2	3	4	5	6	7	8	Final
Nunavut (Sattelberg)	0	0	0	0	1	0	0	1	2
Northwest Territories (Hudy)	2	1	0	0	0	1	1	0	5

=== Championship Pool ===
==== Championship Pool Standings ====
Including games against other Championship Pool teams from Round Robin

Province	Skip	W	L
Alberta	Glen Hansen	6	1
New Brunswick	Wayne Tallon	5	2
Manitoba	Randy Neufeld	5	2
Quebec	Ted Butler	4	3
Ontario	Jeff McCrady	4	3
Nova Scotia	Wayne Sangster	2	5
British Columbia	Wes Craig	1	6
Saskatchewan	Glen Despins	1	6

===== Draw 15 =====
Sheet A	1	2	3	4	5	6	7	8	Final
British Columbia (Craig)	0	0	1	0	1	0	1	1	4
Alberta (Hansen)	1	1	0	2	0	1	0	0	5

Sheet B	1	2	3	4	5	6	7	8	Final
New Brunswick (Tallon)	0	0	2	0	1	0	2	1	6
Nova Scotia (Sangster)	0	3	0	0	0	1	0	0	4

Sheet C	1	2	3	4	5	6	7	8	Final
Ontario (McCrady)	1	0	0	2	1	1	0	1	6
Saskatchewan (Despins)	0	1	1	0	0	0	2	0	4

Sheet D	1	2	3	4	5	6	7	8	Final
Manitoba (Neufeld)	0	2	0	2	0	1	0	2	7
Quebec (Butler)	0	0	2	0	1	0	2	0	5

===== Draw 17 =====
Sheet A	1	2	3	4	5	6	7	8	Final
Ontario (McCrady)	0	1	0	0	2	0	1	0	4
Quebec (Butler)	1	0	0	2	0	2	0	1	6

Sheet B	1	2	3	4	5	6	7	8	9	Final
Manitoba (Neufeld)	0	0	0	1	2	0	2	0	4	9
Saskatchewan (Despins)	1	0	1	0	0	1	0	2	0	5

Sheet D	1	2	3	4	5	6	7	8	Final
New Brunswick (Tallon)	1	0	1	1	0	0	1	0	4
Alberta (Hansen)	0	2	0	0	2	1	0	1	6

Sheet E	1	2	3	4	5	6	7	8	Final
British Columbia (Craig)	0	2	0	0	0	0	2	0	4
Nova Scotia (Sangster)	1	0	3	1	0	0	0	1	6

===== Draw 20 =====
Sheet A	1	2	3	4	5	6	7	8	Final
Saskatchewan (Despins)	0	1	2	0	0	1	0	X	4
New Brunswick (Tallon)	2	0	0	4	1	0	2	X	9

Sheet B	1	2	3	4	5	6	7	8	Final
Quebec (Butler)	0	1	0	2	2	0	1	X	6
British Columbia (Craig)	1	0	1	0	0	1	0	X	3

Sheet E	1	2	3	4	5	6	7	8	9	Final
Alberta (Hansen)	0	0	0	0	2	2	0	1	1	6
Ontario (McCrady)	0	1	0	2	0	0	2	0	0	5

Sheet F	1	2	3	4	5	6	7	8	Final
Nova Scotia (Sangster)	0	2	0	0	0	0	0	X	2
Manitoba (Neufeld)	0	0	0	2	1	2	1	X	6

===== Draw 22 =====
Sheet E	1	2	3	4	5	6	7	8	Final
Quebec (Butler)	0	1	0	0	0	0	0	X	1
New Brunswick (Tallon)	2	0	0	0	0	2	2	X	6

Sheet F	1	2	3	4	5	6	7	8	Final
Saskatchewan (Despins)	0	1	0	1	1	0	1	0	4
British Columbia (Craig)	1	0	2	0	0	1	0	1	5

===== Draw 23 =====
Sheet C	1	2	3	4	5	6	7	8	Final
Alberta (Hansen)	0	1	0	0	2	1	2	X	6
Manitoba (Neufeld)	0	0	2	0	0	0	0	X	2

Sheet D	1	2	3	4	5	6	7	8	Final
Nova Scotia (Sangster)	0	0	2	0	0	0	X	X	2
Ontario (McCrady)	1	1	0	3	1	2	X	X	8

== Playoffs ==
Semifinal
1	Alberta	2
4	Quebec	6
2	New Brunswick	4
3	Manitoba	6

Final
3	Manitoba	5
4	Quebec	3

Bronze medal
1	Alberta	5
2	New Brunswick	6

=== Semifinals ===
Sheet B	1	2	3	4	5	6	7	8	Final
Alberta (Hansen)	0	0	0	1	1	0	0	X	2
Quebec (Butler)	0	1	2	0	0	2	1	X	6

Sheet C	1	2	3	4	5	6	7	8	Final
Manitoba (Neufeld)	0	2	0	3	0	0	1	X	6
New Brunswick (Tallon)	1	0	2	0	0	1	0	X	4

=== Bronze medal game ===
Sheet E	1	2	3	4	5	6	7	8	9	Final
New Brunswick (Tallon)	0	0	1	0	2	0	1	1	1	6
Alberta (Hansen)	2	1	0	1	0	1	0	0	0	5

=== Final ===
Sheet D	1	2	3	4	5	6	7	8	Final
Manitoba (Neufeld)	0	2	0	1	0	1	0	1	5
Quebec (Butler)	0	0	1	0	1	0	1	0	3
