= Centre de services scolaire au Cœur-des-Vallées =

The Centre de services scolaire au Cœur-des-Vallées (CSSCV) is a school service centre headquartered in the Buckingham district of Gatineau, Quebec, in the Ottawa metropolitan area.

CSCV operates public schools in the Buckingham and Masson-Angers districts of Gatineau, as well as the Papineau Regional County Municipality (except Lac-des-Plages) and the L'Ange-Gardien and Notre-Dame-de-la-Salette municipalities of the Les Collines-de-l'Outaouais Regional County Municipality.

== Schools ==
Primary and secondary:

- École Providence / J.-M.-Robert - St-André-Avellin - Occupies the Province and J.-M.-Robert buildings
- École Saint-Michel - Gatineau

Secondary:

- École secondaire Hormidas-Gamelin - Gatineau
- École Ste-famille/Trois-Chemins - Thurso
- École secondaire Louis-Joseph Papineau - Papineauville

Primary schools in Gatineau:

- École aux Quatre-Vents
- École du Boisé
- École Monseigneur-Charbonneau
- École du Ruisseau
- École du Sacré-Coeur
- École St-Jean-de-Brébeuf
- École St-Laurent

Primary schools in other municipalities:

- École Adrien-Guillaume - Chénéville
- École de la Montagne - Notre-Dame-de-la-Salette
- École Maria-Goretti - Thurso
- École du Sacré-Coeur - Plaisance
- École St-Coeur-de-Marie - Ripon
- École St-Pie X - Papineauville
- École St-Michel Montebello - Montebello
