= Papineauville =

- Municipality
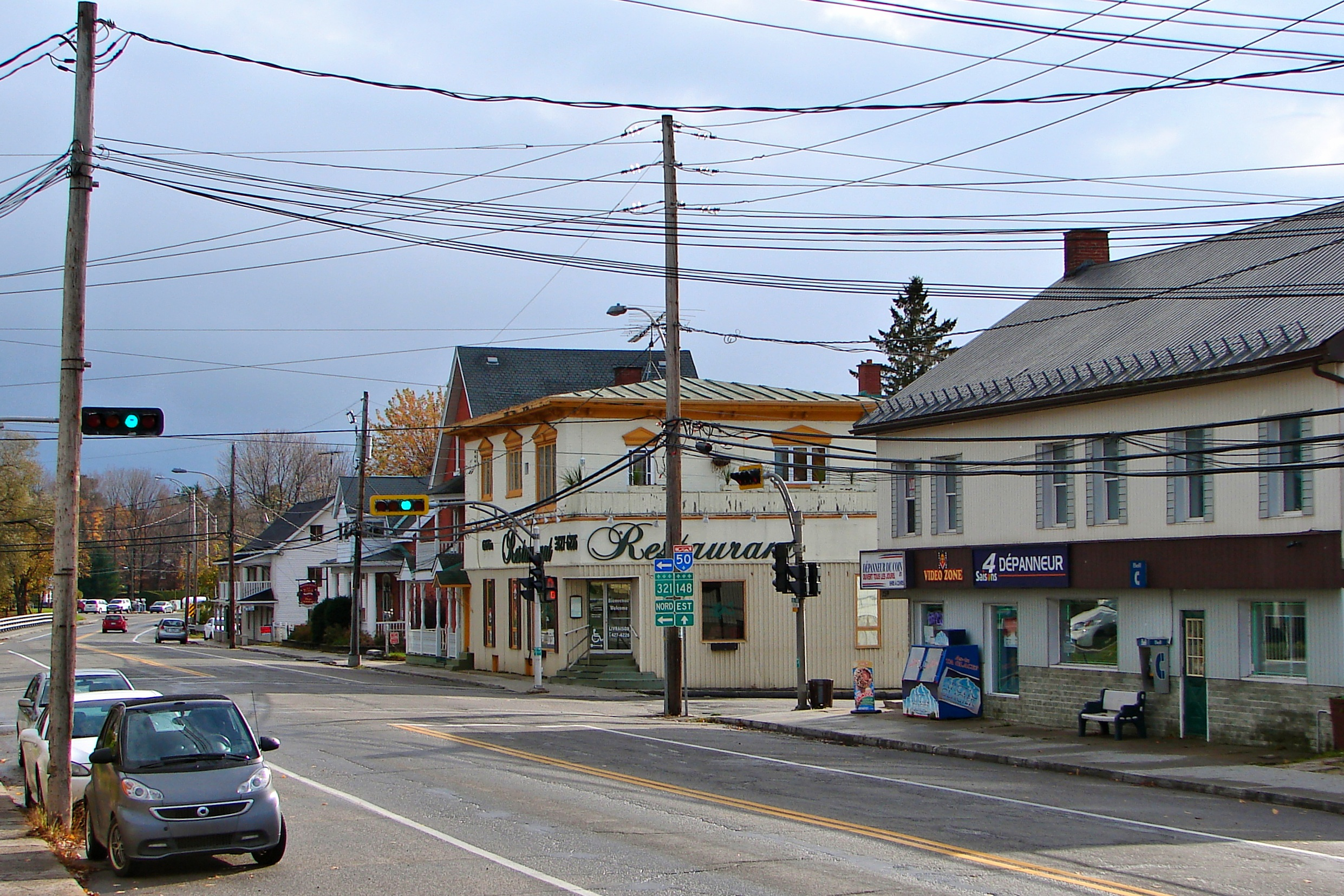

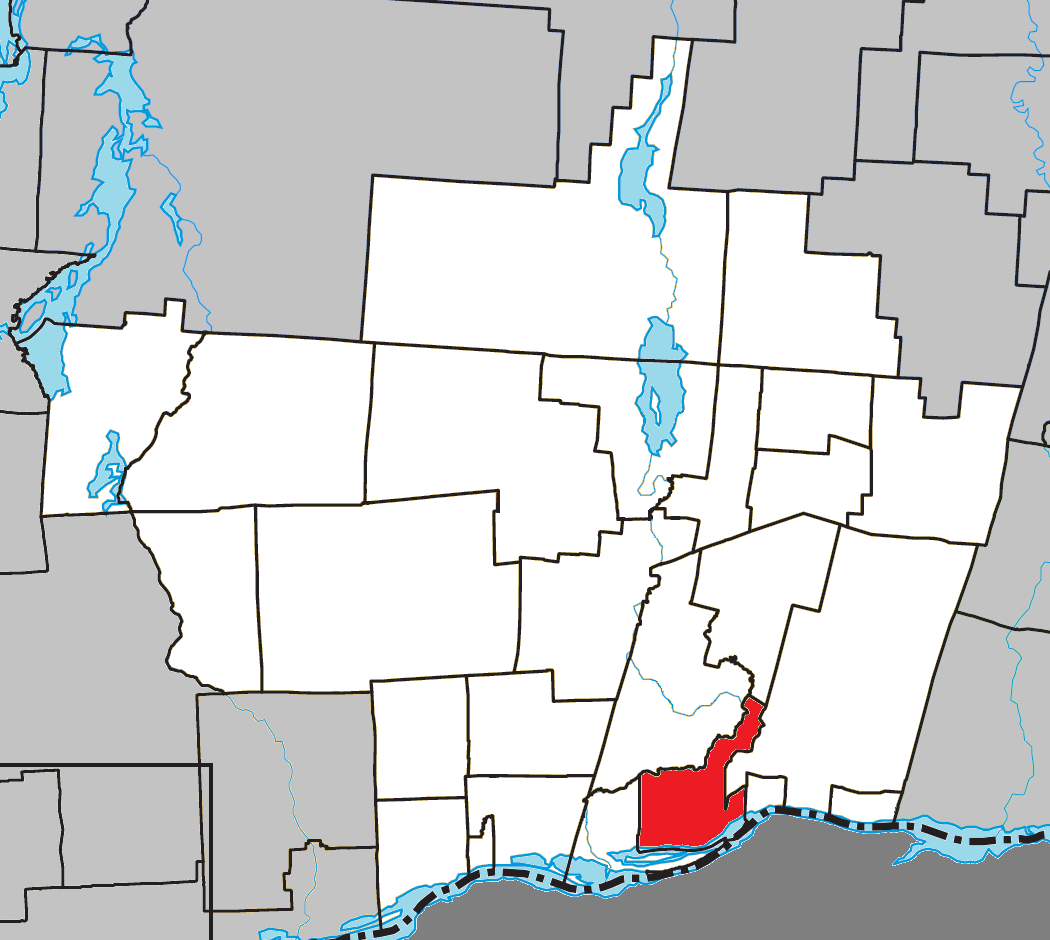
- Location within Papineau RCM

- Location in western Quebec
- Coordinates: 45°37′N 75°01′W
- Country: Canada
- Province: Quebec
- Region: Outaouais
- RCM: Papineau
- Settled: c. 1850
- Constituted: November 29, 2000

Government
  - Mayor: Paul-Andre David
  - Federal riding: Argenteuil—La Petite-Nation
  - Prov. riding: Papineau

Area
  - Total: 64.90 km^{2} (25.06 sq mi)
  - Land: 61.33 km^{2} (23.68 sq mi)

Population (2016)
  - Total: 2,101
  - Density: 34.3/km^{2} (89/sq mi)
  - Pop 2011-2016: ▼3.0%
  - Dwellings: 1,086
- Time zone: UTC−5 (EST)
  - Summer (DST): UTC−4 (EDT)
- Postal code(s): J0V 1R0
- Area code: 819
- Highways A-50: R-148; R-321; R-323
- Website: www.papineauville.ca

Papineauville (French pronunciation: [papinovil]) is a town and municipality in the Outaouais region of Quebec, Canada. It is the seat of the Papineau Regional County Municipality. In 2001 its population was 2247.

The municipality is bordered on the north side by the Petite-Nation River and on the south side by Pentecost Bay of the Ottawa River.

== History ==
The Parish of Sainte-Angélique was formed in 1851, and the parish municipality with the same name was created in 1855. It was named after Angélique-Louise Cornud, wife of Denis-Benjamin Papineau, who donated land for the construction of the church and the rectory.

Also in 1855, a post office was established with the name Papineauville. This may be named in honour of one of two persons named Papineau: Joseph Papineau (1752–1841), father of Louis-Joseph Papineau, who in 1801 bought the lordship of the Petite-Nation where the town formed; or Denis-Benjamin Papineau (1789–1854), brother of Louis-Joseph and husband of Angélique-Louise, and considered the founder of this place.

In 1896, the Village Municipality of Papineauville separated from Sainte-Angélique. Its first mayor was Henri Bourassa.

On November 29, 2000, the Village Municipality of Papineauville and the Parish Municipality of Sainte-Angélique were reunited and merged into the new Municipality of Papineauville. The name Sainte-Angélique now identifies the sector of Papineauville which corresponds to the territory of the former parish municipality.

On January 1, 2002, about 13 square kilometres (5.0 sq mi) of the Presqu'île Peninsula in the Ottawa River was transferred to the municipality of Plaisance.

== Demographics ==
Canada census – Papineauville community profile

	2021	2016	2011
Population	2,153 (+2.5% from 2016)	2,101 (-3.0% from 2011)	2,165 (-0.1% from 2006)
Land area	61.13 km^{2} (23.60 sq mi)	61.33 km^{2} (23.68 sq mi)	61.22 km^{2} (23.64 sq mi)
Population density	35.2/km^{2} (91/sq mi)	34.3/km^{2} (89/sq mi)	35.4/km^{2} (92/sq mi)
Median age	51.6 (M: 51.6, F: 51.6)	48.8 (M: 48.6, F: 49.0)	47.8 (M: 46.3, F: 48.7)
Private dwellings	1,020 (total)	1,086 (total)	1,078 (total)
Median household income		$52,843	$48,038

References: 2021 2016 2011

Historical census populations – Papineauville, Quebec
Year	Pop.	±%
1986	2,166	—
1991	2,229	+2.9%
1996	2,262	+1.5%
2001	2,150	−5.0%
2006	2,167	+0.8%
2011	2,165	−0.1%
2016	2,101	−3.0%
Population amounts prior to 2000 are total of Papineauville VL and Sainte-Angélique P. Source: Statistics Canada

Mother tongue:

- English as first language: 2.1%
- French as first language: 95.2%
- English and French as first language: 1.4%
- Other as first language: 1.2%

== Local government ==
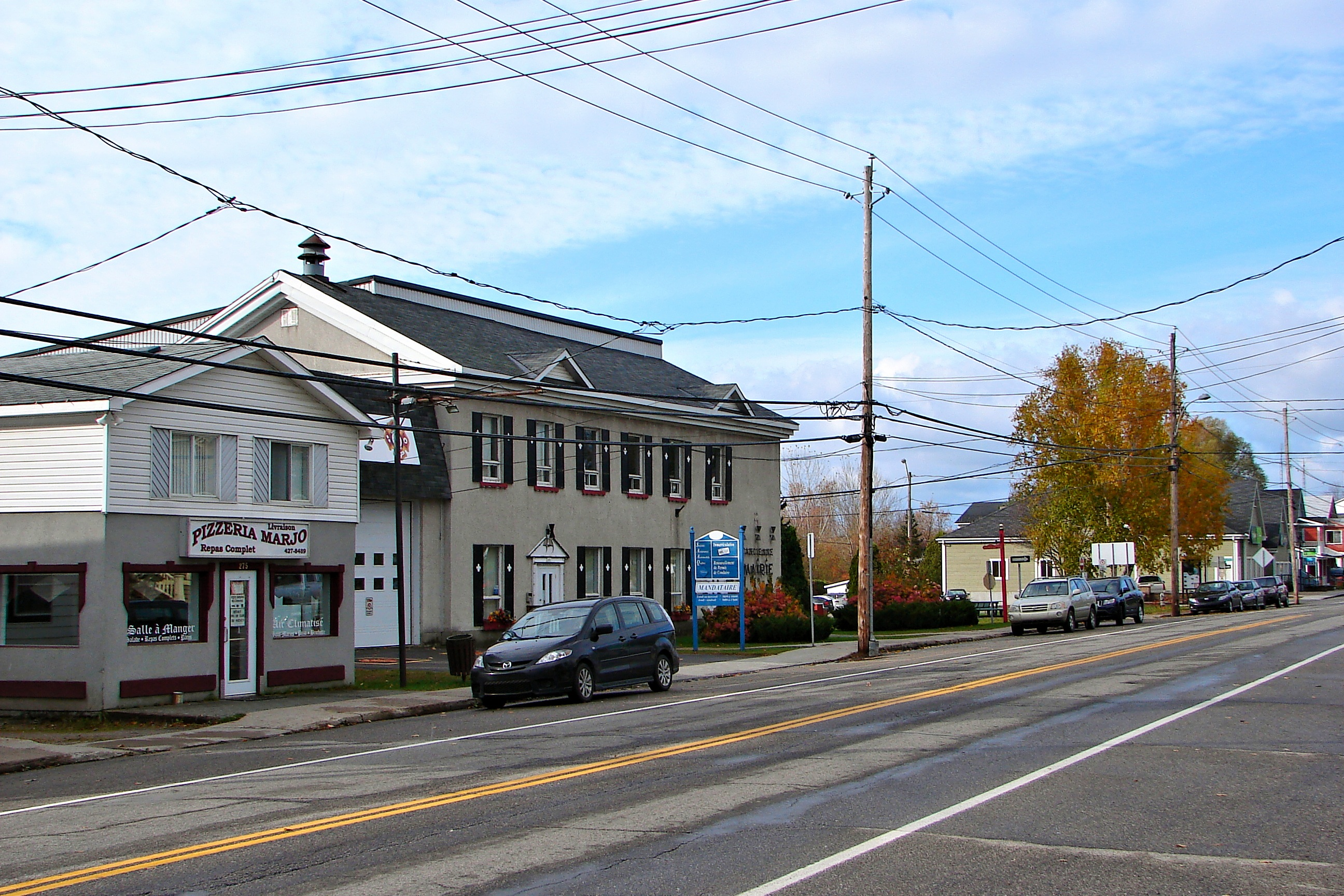
Former town hall along Route 148

List of former mayors:

- André Blais (2005–2009)
- Gilles Clément (2009-2013)
- Christian Beauchamp (2013–2021)
- Paul-André David (2021–present)

== Education ==
The community is served by the French school board Commission Scolaire au Coeur des Vallees including École secondaire Louis-Joseph Papineau.
