= École secondaire Louis-Joseph Papineau =

École secondaire Louis-Joseph-Papineau

Location
- 378, rue Papineau (route 148); Papineauville, Quebec, J0V 1R0; Canada
- Coordinates: 45.6174°N 75.0272°W

Information
- School type: High school
- Founded: 1975
- School board: Centre de services scolaire au Cœur-des-Vallées
- Principal: Mrs. Josée L’Allier
- Grades: Secondary 1-5
- Enrollment: 506 (2019)
- Language: French
- Area: Outaouais
- Team name: Patriotes
- Website: ljp.csscv.qc.ca
- Last updated: March 18, 2021

École secondaire Louis-Joseph-Papineau is a francophone public mixed secondary school in the region of Outaouais in Quebec. It is located in the municipality of Papineauville in the Papineau region (also called la Petite-Nation region) about 30 kilometres east of the eastern limits of the city of Gatineau along route 148 and 60 kilometres from downtown Ottawa. It is operated by the Centre de services scolaire au Cœur-des-Vallées (CSSCV) school board. In 2019, the school had 506 students and 38 teachers.

== History ==
In 1968, there is an association with Séminaire Montfort and the Commission scolaire régionale Papineau (CSRP) during the school Reform system in Quebec. The Séminaire opens their doors to extern students. In 1971, the institutional association regime is withdraw and, in September, 510 students from secondary level coming from Petite-Nation territory and 125 students from Montfort foyer received education with CSRP. In 1972, the CSRP acquired Séminaire Montfort and the Polyvalente Louis-Joseph-Papineau was officially established in 1975 on the site of the Séminaire Montfort.

The school is named after the late Quebec politician, lawyer, landlord of the seigneurie de la Petite-Nation and leader of the reformist Patriote movement, involved in the Rebellions of 1837-38, Louis-Joseph Papineau.

== School and facilities ==
The establishment has four stories and is covered with dark brown brick highlighted with some beige facade panels and lots of windows and a huge multicolored mosaic in front. The building is divided in many aisles interconnected. It contains mainly regular classrooms, rooms for professional education, computer labs, science labs, plastic art workshops, a music room, a cafeteria, a library and an auditorium. The school comprises a gymnasium plus outdoor facilities such as two soccer fields, a football field, a baseball field, a running track, 4 tennis courts and a beach volleyball court.

== Programs and services ==
Besides the regular program, the school offers specialized programs such as International Education program, Pre-secondary studies Diploma program and Maths program.

Many professional services are offered to the students: nurse, psychologist, psycho educators, supervisors, etc. Finally, a homework assistance program is offered after school.

== Facts ==
- The school's football team is called the Patriotes and have been regional champions three times from 2003 to 2006.
- Since November 2006, the school has a foundation called Fondation LJP, responsible to collect funds to improve activities and equipment at the school as well as helping students with difficulties and rewarding students with academic performances.
