= Buckingham Curling Club =

Buckingham Curling Club Club de curling de Buckingham
- Location: 626 Avenue de Buckingham; Buckingham, Gatineau, QC J8L 2H2

Information
- Established: 1918
- Club type: Dedicated ice
- Sheets of ice: 2
- Rock colours: Blue and Yellow
- Website: https://www.curlingbuckingham.com

The Buckingham Curling Club (French: Club de curling de Buckingham) is an historic curling club located in Buckingham, Quebec. It is the only curling club located within the city limits of Gatineau. Despite only having two sheets of ice and small membership, the club has produced many Brier and Hearts representatives in the past, owing to its proximity to strong teams in nearby Ottawa.

The Royal Caledonian Curling Club (the mother body of the sport) indicates that a curling club existed in Buckingham as late as 1857. This first version of the Buckingham curling club ceased operations in 1867.

The second version of the club was opened in 1894 by the Whaleback Skating Rink, but closed a few years later.

The third and final incarnation of the Buckingham Curling Club was founded in 1918 when a curling rink was built, with play beginning in 1919. In 1937, a women's section was added.

In 1947, artificial ice was installed at the club. In 1952, the club switched from iron stones (used only in Quebec and Eastern Ontario) to granite rocks. In 1958, the current rink was built.

The club played host to the Challenge de Curling de Gatineau event on the World Curling Tour from 2009 to 2018.

Buckingham maintains an historical rivalry with the Ottawa Curling Club. Each year, the two clubs participate in the Currier Cup, North America's second oldest sporting trophy (after the America's Cup). The cup has been played off and on since the 1860s. At the time, the two clubs were the only ones in the Ottawa area. The trophy was donated by Joseph Merrill Currier, local Member of Parliament.

== Brier representatives ==
- 1989: Pierre Charette
- 1992: Ted Butler
- 1993: Pierre Charette
- 1996: Pierre Charette
- 1997: Pierre Charette

== Tournament of Hearts representatives ==
- 1983: Agnès Charette
- 1984: Agnès Charette
- 1989: Agnès Charette
- 1992: Agnès Charette
- 1993: Agnès Charette
- 1994: Agnès Charette
- 1997: Chantal Osborne
