= Glen Hansen =

Canadian curler

Glen Hansen (born 1962 or 1963) is a Canadian curler from Hinton, Alberta. He currently skips a team on the World Curling Tour.

Hansen with teammates Tiffany Steuber, Les Steuber and Sherry French won the 2015 Alberta mixed championship and represented Alberta at the 2015 Canadian Mixed Curling Championship (played in the Fall of 2014). There the team went 3–3 in their first six games, but were relegated to the seeing pool, where they won their remaining three games, finishing 9th overall.

The next season, Hansen with teammates Doug McLennan, George Parsons and former Olympic silver medallist Don Bartlett won the Alberta men's senior championships. The team represented Alberta at the 2015 Canadian Senior Curling Championships, finishing in first place after the round robin. However, the team would lose in both the semi-final and the bronze medal final.

After 41 years of curling, Hansen and his senior men's team played in his first ever provincial men's championship, the 2016 Boston Pizza Cup. Hansen and his team managed to win two games before being eliminated in the triple knock-out event.

On the World Curling Tour, Hansen won his first tour event win when he won the 2016 Avonair Cash Spiel.
