= 2015 Canadian Mixed Curling Championship =

Canadian curling competition

- Host city: North Bay, Ontario
- Arena: North Bay Granite Club
- Dates: November 10–15, 2014
- Winner: Saskatchewan
- Curling club: Swift Current CC, Swift Current
- Skip: Max Kirkpatrick
- Third: Jolene Campbell
- Second: Chris Haichert
- Lead: Teejay Haichert
- Finalist: Northwest Territories (Jamie Koe)

The 2015 Canadian Mixed Curling Championship were held from November 10 to 15, 2014 at the North Bay Granite Club in North Bay, Ontario. The winners of this championship represented Canada at the inaugural World Mixed Curling Championship in 2015.

== Teams ==
The teams are listed as follows:

Team	Skip	Third	Second	Lead	Locale
Alberta	Glen Hansen	Lisa Miller	Les Steuber	Sherry French	Hinton CC, Hinton
British Columbia	Wes Craig	Sarah Wark	Miles Craig	Michelle Allen	Kerry Park CC, Mill Bay
Manitoba	Jared Kolomaya	Kerri Einarson	Kyle Einarson	Jennifer Clark-Rouire	Thistle CC, Winnipeg
New Brunswick	Scott Jones	Cathlia Ward	Chris Jeffrey	Kendra Lister	Curl Moncton, Moncton
Newfoundland and Labrador	Gary Oke	Susan Curtis	Terry Oke	Sigrid Fitzpatrick	Corner Brook CC, Corner Brook
Northern Ontario	Colin Koivula	Oye-Sem Won Briand	Chris Briand	Amanda Gates	Port Arthur CC, Thunder Bay
Northwest Territories	Jamie Koe	Kerry Galusha	Robert Borden	Megan Cormier	Yellowknife CC, Yellowknife
Nova Scotia	Brent MacDougall	Christina Black	Kris Granchelli	Jane Snyder	Mayflower CC, Halifax
Nunavut	Wade Kingdon	Geneva Chislett	Peter Mackey	Robyn Mackey	Iqaluit CC, Iqaluit
Ontario	Chris Gardner	Trish Hill	Jonathan Beuk	Jessica Barcauskas	Ottawa CC, Ottawa
Prince Edward Island	Jamie Newson	Vanessa Hamming	Andrew Robinson	Michelle MacIntyre	Cornwall CC, Cornwall
Quebec	Tom Wharry	Amélie Blais	Mike Kennedy	Marie-Josée Fortier	CC Glenmore, Montréal
Saskatchewan	Max Kirkpatrick	Jolene Campbell	Chris Haichert	Teejay Haichert	Swift Current CC, Swift Current
Yukon	Bob Smallwood	Nicole Baldwin	Wade Scoffin	Jody Smallwood	Whitehorse CC, Whitehorse

== Round robin ==
=== Standings ===
Final Standings

Key
Teams to Championship Pool

Pool A	Skip	W	L
Manitoba	Jared Kolomaya	4	2
Northwest Territories	Jamie Koe	4	2
Quebec	Tom Wharry	4	2
British Columbia	Wes Craig	3	3
Alberta	Glen Hansen	3	3
Yukon	Bob Smallwood	2	4
New Brunswick	Scott Jones	1	5

Pool B	Skip	W	L
Ontario	Chris Gardner	6	0
Saskatchewan	Max Kirkpatrick	4	2
Nova Scotia	Brent MacDougall	4	2
Northern Ontario	Colin Koivula	3	3
Prince Edward Island	Jamie Newson	3	3
Newfoundland and Labrador	Gary Oke	1	5
Nunavut	Wade Kingdon	0	6

=== Results ===
The draw is listed as follows:

==== Draw 1 ====
Monday, November 10, 9:30 am

Sheet 1	1	2	3	4	5	6	7	8	Final
Manitoba (Koloyama)	0	1	0	0	1	1	1	0	4
Northwest Territories (Koe) 🔨	2	0	2	1	0	0	0	1	6

Sheet 2	1	2	3	4	5	6	7	8	Final
New Brunswick (Jones) 🔨	1	0	3	1	1	3	X	X	9
British Columbia (Craig)	0	1	0	0	0	0	X	X	1

Sheet 3	1	2	3	4	5	6	7	8	Final
Northern Ontario (Koivula) 🔨	1	0	4	1	0	0	1	0	7
Newfoundland and Labrador (Oke)	0	1	0	0	2	1	0	0	4

Sheet 4	1	2	3	4	5	6	7	8	Final
Ontario (Gardner)	1	3	1	3	1	0	X	X	9
Nunavut (Kingdon) 🔨	0	0	0	0	0	1	X	X	1

==== Draw 2 ====
Monday, November 10, 3:00 pm

Sheet 1	1	2	3	4	5	6	7	8	Final
Saskatchewan (Kirkpatrick)	0	3	2	0	2	1	1	X	9
Nunavut (Kingdon) 🔨	1	0	0	1	0	0	0	X	2

Sheet 2	1	2	3	4	5	6	7	8	Final
Northwest Territories (Koe)	0	1	0	0	1	0	1	0	3
Alberta (Hansen) 🔨	1	0	0	1	0	1	0	1	4

Sheet 3	1	2	3	4	5	6	7	8	Final
Yukon (Smallwood)	0	1	0	1	1	3	4	X	10
New Brunswick (Jones) 🔨	0	0	1	0	0	0	0	X	1

Sheet 4	1	2	3	4	5	6	7	8	Final
Prince Edward Island (Newson)	0	0	3	0	0	0	0	X	3
Nova Scotia (MacDougall) 🔨	0	1	0	0	2	2	1	X	6

Sheet 5	1	2	3	4	5	6	7	8	Final
Quebec (Wharry) 🔨	1	0	1	0	1	0	0	X	3
British Columbia (Craig)	0	1	0	3	0	3	1	X	8

==== Draw 3 ====
Monday, November 10, 7:30 pm

Sheet 1	1	2	3	4	5	6	7	8	Final
Alberta (Hansen) 🔨	2	2	0	1	0	2	1	X	8
Yukon (Smallwood)	0	0	2	0	2	0	0	X	4

Sheet 2	1	2	3	4	5	6	7	8	Final
Northern Ontario (Koivula)	0	0	1	0	0	1	1	0	3
Nova Scotia (MacDougall) 🔨	0	2	0	2	2	0	0	1	7

Sheet 3	1	2	3	4	5	6	7	8	Final
Manitoba (Koloyama)	1	0	3	0	0	1	0	0	5
Quebec (Wharry) 🔨	0	2	0	2	0	0	1	3	8

Sheet 4	1	2	3	4	5	6	7	8	Final
Newfoundland and Labrador (Oke) 🔨	2	0	0	0	1	0	1	X	4
Saskatchewan (Kirkpatrick)	0	3	1	0	0	2	0	X	6

Sheet 5	1	2	3	4	5	6	7	8	Final
Prince Edward Island (Newson) 🔨	0	1	3	0	0	0	1	X	5
Ontario (Gardner)	1	0	0	1	4	2	0	X	8

==== Draw 4 ====
Tuesday, November 11, 9:30 am

Sheet 2	1	2	3	4	5	6	7	8	Final
Nunavut (Kingdon)	0	0	1	0	1	0	0	X	2
Prince Edward Island (Newson) 🔨	1	1	0	5	0	1	1	X	9

Sheet 3	1	2	3	4	5	6	7	8	Final
Saskatchewan (Kirkpatrick) 🔨	1	1	0	2	0	1	0	2	7
Nova Scotia (MacDougall)	0	0	1	0	2	0	1	0	4

Sheet 4	1	2	3	4	5	6	7	8	Final
British Columbia (Craig)	0	1	2	0	2	1	0	2	8
Alberta (Hansen) 🔨	2	0	0	1	0	0	1	0	4

Sheet 5	1	2	3	4	5	6	7	8	Final
New Brunswick (Jones)	0	1	0	0	0	1	0	X	2
Northwest Territories (Koe) 🔨	0	0	1	1	0	0	2	X	4

==== Draw 5 ====
Tuesday, November 11, 2:00 pm

Sheet 1	1	2	3	4	5	6	7	8	Final
Nova Scotia (MacDougall) 🔨	1	1	0	1	0	0	1	0	4
Ontario (Gardner)	0	0	1	0	3	1	0	1	6

Sheet 2	1	2	3	4	5	6	7	8	Final
Yukon (Smallwood) 🔨	1	0	1	1	0	2	0	X	5
Quebec (Wharry)	0	2	0	0	5	0	2	X	9

Sheet 3	1	2	3	4	5	6	7	8	Final
Newfoundland and Labrador (Oke)	0	0	2	0	1	0	X	X	3
Prince Edward Island (Newson) 🔨	3	1	0	3	0	2	X	X	9

Sheet 4	1	2	3	4	5	6	7	8	Final
Saskatchewan (Kirkpatrick) 🔨	2	0	0	3	0	0	0	X	5
Northern Ontario (Koivula)	0	1	0	0	0	1	1	X	3

Sheet 5	1	2	3	4	5	6	7	8	Final
Alberta (Hansen)	0	1	0	0	0	3	1	X	5
Manitoba (Koloyama) 🔨	2	0	3	1	2	0	0	X	8

==== Draw 6 ====
Tuesday, November 11, 6:30 pm

Sheet 1	1	2	3	4	5	6	7	8	Final
Yukon (Smallwood)	0	0	2	1	0	4	2	X	9
British Columbia (Craig) 🔨	2	1	0	0	3	0	0	X	6

Sheet 2	1	2	3	4	5	6	7	8	Final
Newfoundland and Labrador (Oke)	0	0	0	0	0	1	X	X	1
Ontario (Gardner) 🔨	1	1	1	2	4	0	X	X	9

Sheet 3	1	2	3	4	5	6	7	8	Final
New Brunswick (Jones)	0	0	0	0	1	0	2	X	3
Manitoba (Koloyama) 🔨	2	1	1	1	0	1	0	X	6

Sheet 4	1	2	3	4	5	6	7	8	Final
Northwest Territories (Koe)	1	1	0	1	1	0	2	X	6
Quebec (Wharry) 🔨	0	0	1	0	0	2	0	X	3

Sheet 5	1	2	3	4	5	6	7	8	Final
Nunavut (Kingdon)	0	0	0	0	1	0	X	X	1
Northern Ontario (Koivula) 🔨	3	1	0	1	0	4	X	X	9

==== Draw 7 ====
Wednesday, November 12, 9:30 am

Sheet 2	1	2	3	4	5	6	7	8	9	Final
Prince Edward Island (Newson) 🔨	1	0	1	1	0	3	0	0	1	7
Saskatchewan (Kirkpatrick)	0	1	0	0	1	0	2	1	0	6

Sheet 3	1	2	3	4	5	6	7	8	Final
Quebec (Wharry) 🔨	2	1	0	2	2	0	X	X	7
Alberta (Hansen)	0	0	2	0	0	1	X	X	3

Sheet 4	1	2	3	4	5	6	7	8	Final
Manitoba (Koloyama)	0	3	0	3	4	0	X	X	10
Yukon (Smallwood) 🔨	1	0	1	0	0	1	X	X	3

Sheet 5	1	2	3	4	5	6	7	8	Final
Nova Scotia (MacDougall) 🔨	0	1	0	1	1	0	1	1	5
Newfoundland and Labrador (Oke)	1	0	1	0	0	1	0	0	3

==== Draw 8 ====
Wednesday, November 12, 2:00 pm

Sheet 1	1	2	3	4	5	6	7	8	Final
Quebec (Wharry)	0	1	1	0	2	0	1	1	6
New Brunswick (Jones) 🔨	1	0	0	1	0	1	0	0	3

Sheet 2	1	2	3	4	5	6	7	8	Final
British Columbia (Craig)	0	1	0	0	2	0	0	X	3
Manitoba (Koloyama) 🔨	1	0	2	0	0	2	2	X	7

Sheet 3	1	2	3	4	5	6	7	8	9	Final
Ontario (Gardner)	0	0	2	0	1	1	0	1	1	6
Northern Ontario (Koivula) 🔨	0	1	0	3	0	0	1	0	0	5

Sheet 4	1	2	3	4	5	6	7	8	Final
Nunavut (Kingdon)	0	1	0	0	2	1	1	0	5
Newfoundland and Labrador (Oke) 🔨	2	0	3	2	0	0	0	2	9

Sheet 5	1	2	3	4	5	6	7	8	Final
Northwest Territories (Koe) 🔨	3	1	0	0	3	0	3	X	10
Yukon (Smallwood)	0	0	2	1	0	1	0	X	4

==== Draw 9 ====
Wednesday, November 12, 6:30 pm

Sheet 1	1	2	3	4	5	6	7	8	Final
Northern Ontario (Koivula) 🔨	0	0	2	0	0	2	0	4	8
Prince Edward Island (Newson)	0	1	0	1	1	0	2	0	5

Sheet 2	1	2	3	4	5	6	7	8	Final
Nova Scotia (MacDougall) 🔨	3	0	2	0	0	2	1	X	8
Nunavut (Kingdon)	0	1	0	1	1	0	0	X	3

Sheet 3	1	2	3	4	5	6	7	8	Final
British Columbia (Craig) 🔨	2	0	2	0	0	2	1	2	9
Northwest Territories (Koe)	0	3	0	3	1	0	0	0	7

Sheet 4	1	2	3	4	5	6	7	8	Final
Alberta (Hansen) 🔨	3	0	0	0	0	1	0	1	5
New Brunswick (Jones)	0	2	0	1	0	0	1	0	4

Sheet 5	1	2	3	4	5	6	7	8	Final
Ontario (Gardner) 🔨	1	1	0	0	2	0	2	0	6
Saskatchewan (Kirkpatrick)	0	0	1	1	0	1	0	2	5

== Placement Round ==
=== Standings ===
Final Standings

Key
Teams to Playoffs

Championship Pool	Skip	W	L
Saskatchewan	Max Kirkpatrick	6	1
Northwest Territories	Jamie Koe	5	2
Ontario	Chris Gardner	5	2
British Columbia	Wes Craig	4	3
Northern Ontario	Colin Koivula	3	4
Quebec	Tom Wharry	2	5
Manitoba	Jared Kolomaya	2	5
Nova Scotia	Brent MacDougall	1	6

Seeding Pool	Skip	W	L
Alberta	Glen Hansen	6	3
Yukon	Robert Smallwood	5	4
New Brunswick	Scott Jones	4	5
Prince Edward Island	Jamie Newson	3	6
Newfoundland and Labrador	Gary Oke	1	8
Nunavut	Wade Kingdon	0	9

=== Results ===
==== Draw 10 ====
Thursday, November 13, 9:30 am

Sheet 2	1	2	3	4	5	6	7	8	Final
Quebec (Wharry) 🔨	2	0	0	0	1	0	X	X	3
Saskatchewan (Kirkpatrick)	0	1	1	2	0	4	X	X	8

Sheet 3	1	2	3	4	5	6	7	8	Final
New Brunswick (Jones)	0	0	1	1	1	3	0	X	6
Prince Edward Island (Newson) 🔨	1	1	0	0	0	0	1	X	3

Sheet 4	1	2	3	4	5	6	7	8	Final
Manitoba (Kolomaya)	0	3	0	0	0	2	1	X	6
Nova Scotia (MacDougall) 🔨	1	0	1	1	0	0	0	X	3

==== Draw 11 ====
Thursday, November 13, 2:00 pm

Sheet 1	1	2	3	4	5	6	7	8	Final
Northwest Territories (Koe) 🔨	1	2	0	0	3	2	0	0	8
Ontario (Gardner)	0	0	1	3	0	0	2	1	7

Sheet 2	1	2	3	4	5	6	7	8	Final
Newfoundland and Labrador (Oke)	0	0	0	1	0	0	1	X	2
Alberta (Hansen) 🔨	0	1	1	0	0	3	0	X	5

Sheet 4	1	2	3	4	5	6	7	8	Final
Yukon (Smallwood) 🔨	4	0	5	1	0	3	X	X	13
Nunavut (Kingdon)	0	1	0	0	1	0	X	X	2

Sheet 5	1	2	3	4	5	6	7	8	Final
British Columbia (Craig) 🔨	0	0	1	1	0	1	0	X	3
Northern Ontario (Koivula)	3	1	0	0	2	0	1	X	7

==== Draw 12 ====
Thursday, November 13, 6:30 pm

Sheet 1	1	2	3	4	5	6	7	8	Final
Northern Ontario (Koivula) 🔨	1	0	0	1	0	0	2	1	5
Manitoba (Kolomaya)	0	0	1	0	0	2	0	0	3

Sheet 2	1	2	3	4	5	6	7	8	Final
Nova Scotia (MacDougall) 🔨	0	1	2	0	1	0	0	0	4
British Columbia (Craig)	1	0	0	1	0	0	3	1	6

Sheet 3	1	2	3	4	5	6	7	8	Final
Ontario (Gardner) 🔨	3	1	1	5	0	1	X	X	11
Quebec (Wharry)	0	0	0	0	1	0	X	X	1

Sheet 4	1	2	3	4	5	6	7	8	Final
Alberta (Hansen) 🔨	2	0	1	0	0	4	0	0	7
Prince Edward Island (Newson)	0	2	0	0	1	0	2	1	6

Sheet 5	1	2	3	4	5	6	7	8	Final
Saskatchewan (Kirkpatrick) 🔨	0	1	0	1	0	2	0	2	6
Northwest Territories (Koe)	0	0	1	0	1	0	1	0	3

==== Draw 13 ====
Friday, November 14, 9:30 am

Sheet 1	1	2	3	4	5	6	7	8	Final
Alberta (Hansen) 🔨	2	1	0	1	0	2	0	X	6
Nunavut (Kingdon)	0	0	1	0	1	0	1	X	3

Sheet 2	1	2	3	4	5	6	7	8	Final
Prince Edward Island (Newson)	0	1	0	0	0	2	X	X	3
Yukon (Smallwood) 🔨	2	0	3	1	2	0	X	X	8

Sheet 4	1	2	3	4	5	6	7	8	Final
New Brunswick (Jones) 🔨	3	1	0	2	0	2	X	X	8
Newfoundland and Labrador (Oke)	0	0	1	0	1	0	X	X	2

==== Draw 14 ====
Friday, November 14, 2:00 pm

Sheet 1	1	2	3	4	5	6	7	8	Final
British Columbia (Craig)	1	0	0	1	0	2	0	0	4
Saskatchewan (Kirkpatrick) 🔨	0	0	2	0	2	0	1	1	6

Sheet 2	1	2	3	4	5	6	7	8	Final
Nunavut (Kingdon)	0	0	1	0	2	0	X	X	3
New Brunswick (Jones) 🔨	1	2	0	2	0	4	X	X	9

Sheet 3	1	2	3	4	5	6	7	8	Final
Northwest Territories (Koe)	0	0	1	2	0	2	0	1	6
Nova Scotia (MacDougall) 🔨	1	1	0	0	1	0	1	0	4

Sheet 4	1	2	3	4	5	6	7	8	Final
Quebec (Wharry)	0	0	1	0	0	1	X	X	2
Northern Ontario (Koivula) 🔨	4	1	0	2	0	0	X	X	7

Sheet 5	1	2	3	4	5	6	7	8	Final
Manitoba (Kolomaya) 🔨	2	0	0	1	0	0	1	X	4
Ontario (Gardner)	0	0	2	0	2	2	0	X	6

==== Draw 15 ====
Friday, November 14, 6:30 pm

Sheet 1	1	2	3	4	5	6	7	8	9	Final
Nova Scotia (MacDougall)	0	0	0	1	0	2	0	3	0	6
Quebec (Wharry) 🔨	1	1	1	0	2	0	1	0	1	7

Sheet 2	1	2	3	4	5	6	7	8	Final
Northern Ontario (Koivula)	0	0	0	1	0	1	0	X	2
Northwest Territories (Koe) 🔨	3	0	0	0	0	0	3	X	6

Sheet 3	1	2	3	4	5	6	7	8	Final
Saskatchewan (Kirkpatrick)	0	3	0	1	2	2	X	X	8
Manitoba (Kolomaya) 🔨	4	0	1	0	0	0	X	X	5

Sheet 4	1	2	3	4	5	6	7	8	Final
Ontario (Gardner) 🔨	1	0	0	0	0	2	X	X	3
British Columbia (Craig)	0	1	1	4	2	0	X	X	8

Sheet 5	1	2	3	4	5	6	7	8	Final
Yukon (Smallwood) 🔨	2	1	3	0	1	0	X	X	7
Newfoundland and Labrador (Oke)	0	0	0	2	0	0	X	X	2

== Playoffs ==
Semifinals
1	Saskatchewan	7
4	British Columbia	4
2	Ontario	3
3	Northwest Territories	7

Final
1	Saskatchewan	7
3	Northwest Territories	4
Bronze medal game
4	British Columbia	2
2	Ontario	9

=== Semifinals ===
Saturday, November 15, 9:30 am

Sheet 2	1	2	3	4	5	6	7	8	Final
Saskatchewan (Kirkpatrick) 🔨	0	0	1	0	3	0	3	X	7
British Columbia (Craig)	0	1	0	2	0	1	0	X	4

Sheet 5	1	2	3	4	5	6	7	8	Final
Ontario (Gardner)	0	0	1	0	1	0	1	X	3
Northwest Territories (Koe) 🔨	4	0	0	2	0	1	0	X	7

=== Bronze medal game ===
Saturday, November 15, 2:00 pm

Team	1	2	3	4	5	6	7	8	Final
British Columbia (Craig)	0	1	0	0	1	0	X	X	2
Ontario (Gardner) 🔨	1	0	1	5	0	2	X	X	9

=== Final ===
Saturday, November 15, 2:00 pm

Team	1	2	3	4	5	6	7	8	Final
Saskatchewan (Kirkpatrick) 🔨	1	0	2	0	2	0	2	X	7
Northwest Territories (Koe)	0	1	0	2	0	1	0	X	4
