= 2015 Canadian Senior Curling Championships =

- Host city: Edmonton, Alberta
- Arena: Thistle Curling Club
- Dates: March 21–28
- Men's winner: Manitoba
- Curling club: La Salle CC, La Salle
- Skip: Randy Neufeld
- Third: Dean Moxham
- Second: Peter Nicholls
- Lead: Dale Michie
- Finalist: Quebec (Butler)
- Women's winner: Alberta
- Curling club: North Hill CC, Calgary
- Skip: Terri Loblaw
- Third: Judy Pendergast
- Second: Sandy Bell
- Lead: Cheryl Meek
- Finalist: Nova Scotia (Jones)

The 2015 Canadian Senior Curling Championships was held from March 21 to 28 at the Thistle Curling Club in Edmonton, Alberta. The winners represented Canada at the 2016 World Senior Curling Championships.

== Men ==
=== Teams ===
The teams are listed as follows:

Province	Skip	Third	Second	Lead	Club(s)
Alberta	Glen Hansen	Doug McLennan	George Parsons	Don Bartlett	Hinton CC, Hinton
British Columbia	Wes Craig	Scott Macdonald	Tony Anslow	Lindsay Cheetham	Victoria CC, Victoria
Manitoba	Randy Neufeld	Dean Moxham	Peter Nicholls	Dale Michie	La Salle CC, La Salle
New Brunswick	Wayne Tallon	Mike Kennedy	Mike Flannery	Wade Blanchard	Capital WC, Fredericton
Newfoundland and Labrador	Glenn Goss (fourth)	Gary Oke (skip)	Blair Fradsham	Dennis Bruce	Corner Brook CC, Corner Brook
Northwest Territories	Glen Hudy	Brian Kelln	Ben McDonald	Richard Klakowich	Yellowknife CC, Yellowknife
Northern Ontario	Al Hackner	Eric Harnden	Frank Morissette	Rob Thomas	Fort William CC, Thunder Bay
Nova Scotia	Wayne Sangster	Phil Redden	Peter Neily	James Barr	Truro CC, Truro
Nunavut	Ed Sattelberger	Dennis Masson	Monty LeComte	Lloyd Kendall	Iqaluit CC, Iqaluit
Ontario	Jeff McCrady	Brian Lewis	Mike Johansen	Graham Sinclair	Ottawa CC, Ottawa
Prince Edward Island	Rod MacDonald	Kevin Champion	Blair Weeks	Mark Victor	Silver Fox CC, Summerside; Charlottetown CC, Charlottetown
Quebec	Ted Butler	Don Westphal	Maurice Cayouette	Michel Laroche	CC Buckingham, Gatineau
Saskatchewan	Glen Despins	Brad Law	Dwayne Mihalicz	Peter Thiele	Callie CC, Regina
Yukon	Walter Wallingham	Gordon Zealand	Herb Balsam	Don Duncan	Whitehorse CC, Whitehorse

=== Round-robin standings ===
Final round-robin standings

Key
Teams to Championship Pool

Pool A	Skip	W	L
Alberta	Glen Hansen	5	1
Nova Scotia	Wayne Sangster	4	2
Quebec	Ted Butler	4	2
Saskatchewan	Glen Despins	3	3
Northern Ontario	Al Hackner	2	4
Northwest Territories	Glen Hudy	2	4
Yukon	Walter Wallingham	1	5

Pool B	Skip	W	L
Manitoba	Randy Neufeld	5	1
Ontario	Jeff McCrady	5	1
New Brunswick	Wayne Tallon	4	2
British Columbia	Wes Craig	3	3
Newfoundland and Labrador	Gary Oke	2	4
Prince Edward Island	Rod MacDonald	2	4
Nunavut	Ed Sattelberger	0	6

=== Championship Pool Standings ===
Final round-robin standings

Key
Teams to Playoffs

Province	Skip	W	L
Alberta	Glen Hansen	6	1
New Brunswick	Wayne Tallon	5	2
Manitoba	Randy Neufeld	5	2
Quebec	Ted Butler	4	3
Ontario	Jeff McCrady	4	3
Nova Scotia	Wayne Sangster	2	5
British Columbia	Wes Craig	1	6
Saskatchewan	Glen Despins	1	6

=== Playoffs ===
Semifinal
1	Alberta	2
4	Quebec	6
2	New Brunswick	4
3	Manitoba	6

Final
4	Quebec	3
3	Manitoba	5
Bronze-medal game
1	Alberta	5
2	New Brunswick	6

==== Semifinals ====
Saturday, March 28, 9:30

Team	1	2	3	4	5	6	7	8	Final
Alberta (Hansen) 🔨	0	0	0	1	1	0	0	X	2
Quebec (Butler)	0	1	2	0	0	2	1	X	6

Team	1	2	3	4	5	6	7	8	Final
New Brunswick (Tallon) 🔨	1	0	2	0	0	1	0	X	4
Manitoba (Neufeld)	0	2	0	3	0	0	1	X	6

==== Bronze-medal game ====
Saturday, March 28, 2:30 pm

Team	1	2	3	4	5	6	7	8	9	Final
Alberta (Hansen) 🔨	2	1	0	1	0	1	0	0	0	5
New Brunswick (Tallon)	0	0	1	0	2	0	1	1	1	6

==== Final ====
Saturday, March 28, 2:30 pm

Team	1	2	3	4	5	6	7	8	Final
Quebec (Butler)	0	0	1	0	1	0	1	0	3
Manitoba (Neufeld) 🔨	0	2	0	1	0	1	0	1	5

== Women ==
=== Teams ===
The teams are listed as follows:

Province	Skip	Third	Second	Lead	Club(s)
Alberta	Terri Loblaw	Judy Pendergast	Sandy Bell	Cheryl Meek	North Hill CC, Calgary
British Columbia	Sandra Jenkins	Kate Horne	Wendy Cseke	Carol Murray	Salmon Arm CC, Salmon Arm
Manitoba	Kim Link	Karen Fallis	Janice Blair	Allyson Bell	East St Paul CC, East St Paul
New Brunswick	Shelly Graham	Connie Nichol	Line Saulnier	Claudette McAllister	Capital WC, Fredericton
Newfoundland and Labrador	Laura Philips	Heather Martin	Marian Dawe	Jeannette Hodder	RE/MAX CC, St. John's
Northwest Territories	Debbie Moss	Marta Moir	Terry Fisher	Heather Bilodeau	Yellowknife CC, Yellowknife
Northern Ontario	Peggy Taylor	Lisa Penner	Colleen Poschner	Tracy Stasiuk	Kenora CC, Kenora
Nova Scotia	Colleen Jones	Kim Kelly	Mary Sue Radford	Nancy Delahunt	Mayflower CC, Halifax
Nunavut	Beverly Ford	Robin Manoll	Mary Anawak	Karen Costello	Iqaluit CC, Iqaluit; Qavik CC, Rankin Inlet
Ontario	Kathy Brown	Donna Buchan	Jan Seager	Nancy Woods	Guelph CC, Guelph
Prince Edward Island	Shirley Berry	Sandy Hope	Shelley Ebbett	Arleen Harris	Cornwall CC, Cornwall; Charlottetown CC, Charlottetown
Quebec	Élaine Roy	Marie-Josée Précourt	Christine Paradis	Martine Tremblay	CC Kénogami, Jonquière
Saskatchewan	Cathy Inglis	Pat Kuspira	Donna Liebrecht	Bev Fuches	Yorkton CC, Yorkton

=== Round-robin standings ===
Final round-robin standings

Key
Teams to Championship Pool

Pool A	Skip	W	L
Saskatchewan	Cathy Inglis	6	0
Nova Scotia	Colleen Jones	5	1
Northern Ontario	Peggy Taylor	3	3
Quebec	Élaine Roy	3	3
Northwest Territories	Debbie Moss	2	4
New Brunswick	Shelly Graham	2	4
Nunavut	Beverly Ford	0	6

Pool B	Skip	W	L
Alberta	Terri Loblaw	5	0
Manitoba	Kim Link	3	2
British Columbia	Sandra Jenkins	3	2
Newfoundland and Labrador	Laura Philips	2	3
Ontario	Kathy Brown	1	4
Prince Edward Island	Shirley Berry	1	4

=== Championship Pool Standings ===
Final round-robin standings

Key
Teams to Playoffs

Province	Skip	W	L
Saskatchewan	Cathy Inglis	6	1
British Columbia	Sandra Jenkins	4	3
Nova Scotia	Colleen Jones	4	3
Alberta	Terri Loblaw	4	3
Northern Ontario	Peggy Taylor	3	4
Manitoba	Kim Link	3	4
Newfoundland and Labrador	Laura Philips	2	5
Quebec	Élaine Roy	2	5

=== Playoffs ===
Semifinal
1	Saskatchewan	3
4	Alberta	9
2	British Columbia	4
3	Nova Scotia	5

Final
4	Alberta	7
3	Nova Scotia	5
Bronze-medal game
1	Saskatchewan	6
2	British Columbia	7

==== Semifinals ====
Saturday, March 28, 9:30

Team	1	2	3	4	5	6	7	8	Final
Saskatchewan (Inglis) 🔨	1	0	1	0	1	0	0	X	3
Alberta (Loblaw)	0	1	0	1	0	4	3	X	9

Team	1	2	3	4	5	6	7	8	9	Final
British Columbia (Jenkins) 🔨	0	0	2	0	1	0	0	1	0	4
Nova Scotia (Jones)	0	0	0	2	0	1	1	0	1	5

==== Bronze-medal game ====
Saturday, March 28, 2:30 pm

Team	1	2	3	4	5	6	7	8	Final
Saskatchewan (Inglis) 🔨	1	0	0	2	0	3	0	0	6
British Columbia (Jenkins)	0	1	2	0	2	0	1	1	7

==== Final ====
Saturday, March 28, 2:30 pm

Team	1	2	3	4	5	6	7	8	Final
Alberta (Loblaw)	0	2	0	2	0	1	0	2	7
Nova Scotia (Jones) 🔨	0	0	2	0	2	0	1	0	5
