= Western Québec School Board =

English-language school board in Quebec, Canada

Coordinates: 45.4215°N 75.8058°W

Western Québec School Board (WQSB, French: Commission scolaire Western Québec) is an English-language school district based in Gatineau, Quebec, Canada. It was formerly a Protestant school district. The chairperson is Wayne Daly, and the director general is George Singfield.

== History ==
The WQSB was created by a series of amalgamations of smaller school boards. In 1998, when Québec's religious school boards were replaced by linguistic boards, seven English-language schools formerly designated as Roman Catholic were transferred to the WQSB. School boards in Québec had been organized along confessional lines, Catholic and Protestant, since before Canadian Confederation.

== Schools ==
The board operates the following schools:

- Buckingham Elementary School (Gatineau, QC; Secteur Buckingham)
- Chelsea Elementary School (Chelsea, QC)
- D'Arcy McGee High School (Gatineau, QC; Secteur Aylmer)
- Dr. S.E. McDowell Elementary School (Shawville, QC)
- Dr. Wilbert Keon School (Chapeau, QC)
- Eardley Elementary School (Gatineau, QC; Secteur Aylmer)
- G. Théberge School (Témiscaming, QC)
- Golden Valley School (Val-d'Or, QC)
- Greater Gatineau Elementary School (Gatineau, QC; Secteur Gatineau)
- Hadley Junior High School (Gatineau, QC; Secteur Hull)
- Lord Aylmer School (Gatineau, QC; Secteur Aylmer)
- Maniwaki Woodland School (Maniwaki, QC)
- Namur Intermediate School (Namur, QC)
- Noranda School (Rouyn-Noranda, QC)
- Onslow Elementary School (Quyon, QC)
- Philemon Wright High School (Gatineau, QC; Secteur Hull)
- Pierre Elliott Trudeau Elementary School (Gatineau, QC; Secteur Hull)
- Poltimore Elementary School (Val-des-Monts, Qc; Secteur Poltimore)
- Pontiac High School (Shawville, QC)
- Queen Elizabeth Elementary School (Kazabazoua, QC)
- South Hull Elementary School (Gatineau, QC; Secteur Aylmer)
- St. John's/John Paul II School (Campbell's Bay, QC)
- St. Michael's High School (Low, QC)
- Symmes Junior High School (Gatineau, QC; Secteur Aylmer)
- Wakefield Elementary School (La Pêche, QC; Secteur Wakefield)

== Bibliography ==
- "Western Quebec School Board Innovates .Tech High Tech Classroom On Wheels Launched by Ryan". The Val d'Or Star. Val d'Or. June 7, 1989.
