= Philemon Wright High School =

Philemon Wright High School/Hadley Junior high

Location
- 80, rue Daniel-Johnson; Gatineau, Quebec, J8Z 1S3; Canada; 45°27′58″N 75°44′56″W

Information
- School type: Public, high school
- Motto: Evigilo, Exsisto Vestri, Operor Vox Res. (Work Hard, Be Yourself, Do the Right Thing.)
- Founded: 1968
- School board: Western Quebec School Board
- School number: (819) 776.3158
- Principal: Dodie Payne
- Vice Principals: Jeremy Wouda(Hadley Junior High School), Terri Mcphail (Philemon Wright High School)
- Grades: 7-11
- Enrollment: 620
- Language: English and French
- Colours: Green and White
- Team name: Falcons/Hawks
- Website: hadleyphilemon.westernquebec.ca

Philemon Wright High School is an anglophone high school located in the Hull sector of Gatineau, Quebec, Canada. It is administered by the Western Quebec School Board and named after Philemon Wright, founder of Hull. Philemon Wright High school also offers an Enriched French program course to students.

The school was constructed in 1968. Its first principal was Clyde MacTavish, who remained in his position until 1976. Students who enrolled in Philemon Wright High School during its first year only had access to the second floor of one block in the building, resulting in over sixty students per classroom until Christmas, when the first-floor classrooms were ready for use.

The building that houses the school is shared with Hadley Junior High School, which contains students from grades 7–8. The two schools are associated with each other within the Western Quebec School Board and share a website.

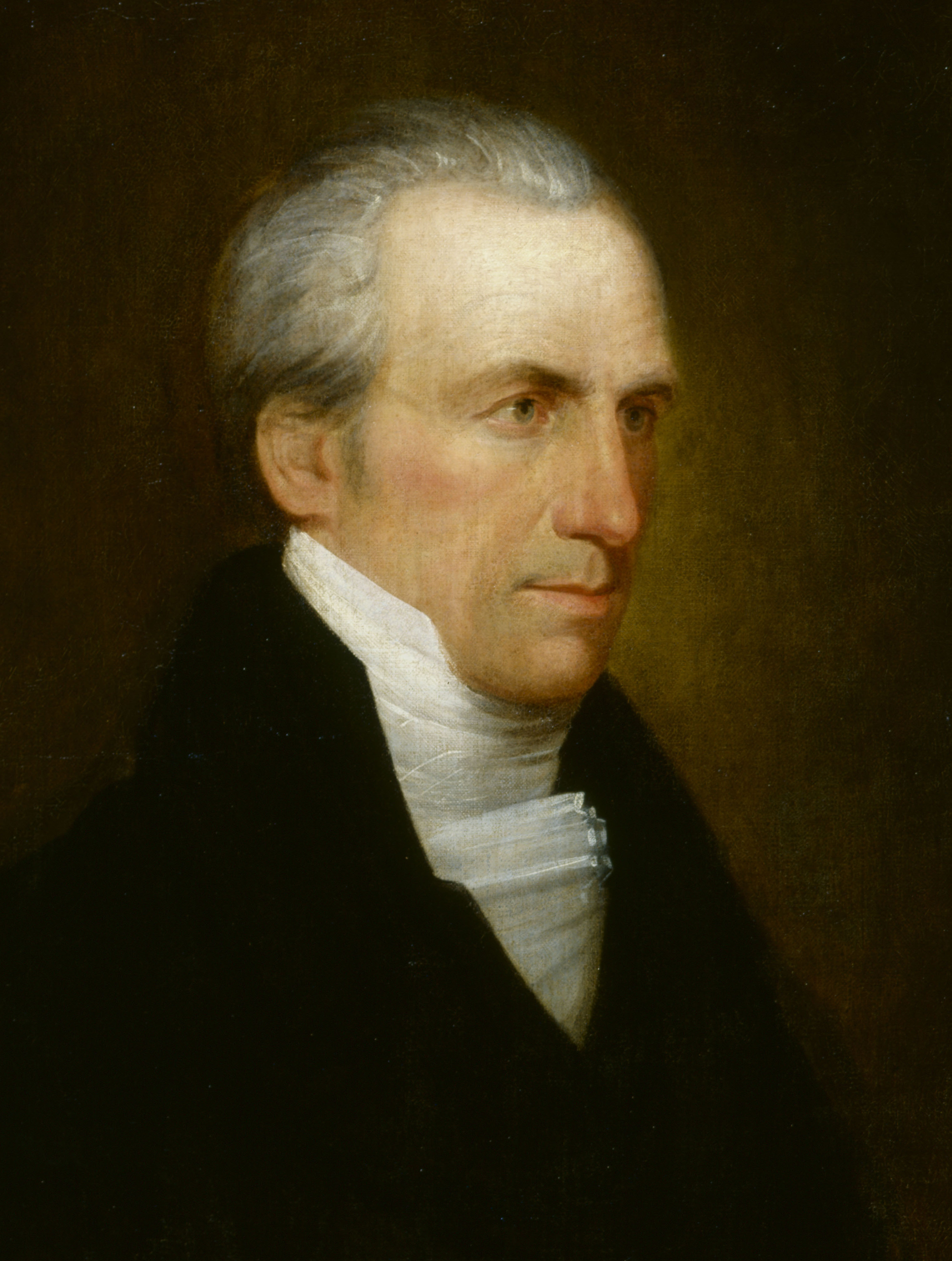
Philemon Wright, the namesake of the high school.
