= Buckingham, Quebec =

Buckingham
- Sector within City of Gatineau
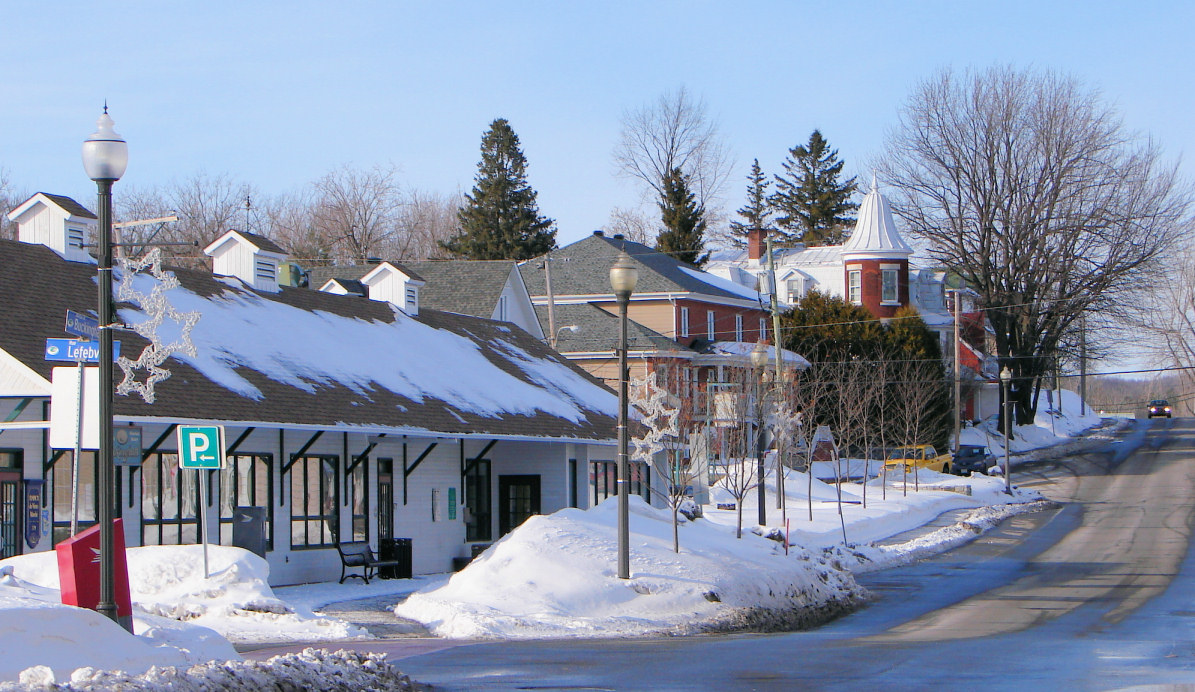

- Location in western Quebec
- Coordinates: 45°35′15″N 75°24′35″W
- Country: Canada
- Province: Quebec
- Region: Outaouais
- City: Gatineau
- Settled: 1824
- Dissolved: January 1, 2002

Area
  - Land: 16.232 km^{2} (6.267 sq mi)

Population (2021)
  - Total: 12,795
  - Density: 788/km^{2} (2,040/sq mi)
  - Pop 2016–2021: ▲4.7%
  - Dwellings: 5,855
- Time zone: UTC-5 (EST)
  - Summer (DST): UTC-4 (EDT)
- Area codes: 819, 873

Buckingham is a former town located in the Outaouais region in the western portion of the province of Quebec, Canada. Since January 1, 2002, it has been part of the amalgamated city of Gatineau, which merged five former municipalities, including Masson-Angers, Buckingham, Hull, Aylmer and Gatineau, into a single entity. According to the 2021 Census, the population of the sector was 12,795.

== History ==
=== First years ===
It was in 1799, that land in this area was granted to John Robertson, a former member of a British regiment. The first people settled in Buckingham in 1823 and the first mill was built. More people moved to Buckingham in the years that followed.

=== Launch of the lumber industry ===
In 1812, Napoleon I of France initiated a continental blockade which forced Great Britain to look to other sources for importing lumber. Soon, large wooded areas were discovered in Lower Canada, including the area that became the Outaouais region. The lumber industry was central to the region's economic development for over a century with wood pulp continuing to be important for several decades afterwards. In 1837, the first sawmill was built by Levi Bigelow.

In January 1849, the Hudson's Bay Company opened a store in Buckingham at the mouth of the Lièvre River. It moved there from Lac des Sables to give HBC staff better control of indigenous traders coming down the Ottawa, Gatineau, and Blanche Rivers, as well as the ability to trade with lumberjacks and settlers. The store closed around 1870.

=== Maclaren family ===
Throughout its history, the city of Buckingham's economy has been dominated by the Albright and Wilson Co (ERCO), which employs most of the people in that area. The Maclaren family may have lived in Buckingham but their industry is part of Masson.

The Maclaren family, who have resided in the region since 1840, have dominated the lumber industry in the Outaouais for over a century. In 1864, James Maclaren launched the family's activities in Buckingham by building a sawmill. The company became J. MacLaren & Co. and later The James Maclaren Company Limited. James' two brothers acquired the company after his death in 1892 and then launched a match company in Buckingham in 1894 which was incorporated a year later. The Maclarens later gained control of the hydroelectricity market in the community and also real estate development and sports facilities. The company built a hydroelectric dam along the Du Lièvre River, just north of Buckingham, at the start of the Great Depression. They later built another one near Masson during the 1950s.

In 1902, the Maclaren group added the wood pulp industry to its activities by building a mill. They later expanded their activities across the region, adding mills in Masson, Mont-Laurier and Thurso located not too far from the Du Lièvre River. The Buckingham mill closed shortly before 1960.

=== Former amalgamation ===
From 1975 to 1980, the townships of Buckingham, Notre-Dame-de-la-Salette, L'Ange-Gardien, Buckingham-Sud-Est, Buckingham-Ouest, Angers and Masson were amalgamated.

=== Development ===
Population growth has been relatively slow because of its location about 30 kilometres (19 mi) from downtown Ottawa. However, due to suburban growth and amalgamation of the town in 2002, several residential developments were created and the population increased. Buckingham is becoming more of a suburban town while still keeping its traditional characteristics in the centre-town area.

=== Amalgamation with the city of Gatineau ===
On January 1, 2002, the city of Buckingham with its 12,000 residents became part of the new city of Gatineau. This was part of a massive merger movement created by the Parti Québécois' Bill 180, which was introduced in 2000 by the Municipal Affairs Minister Louise Harel after studies conducted by public agents.

In 2003, the Quebec Liberal Party, with Jean Charest as the leader, won the 2003 provincial election and promised a referendum would be held on the possibility of demerging municipalities. The referendum was held on June 20, 2004, but the majority of the population voted against the demerger and Buckingham thus remained part of the city of Gatineau.

=== Château dairy ===
The dairy industry was also a major economic asset in the community with Le Château having some of its operations in Buckingham. However, in 2006, Agrodor, a Saguenay-based company that owns the Chateau brand, announced the shutdown of its operations in the Outaouais. The local business sector had launched measures to save the company which has operated in the region since 1943.

After the shutdown of the Château dairy operations in Buckingham, a committee was established to bring dairy production back to the region. Construction started on November 12, 2008, on the future site of what would be called Laiterie de l’Outaouais. The plant officially opened on June 16, 2010.

=== Buckingham en Fête ===
200pxl

Each year since 1991, during the month of July, the Buckingham sector hosted Buckingham en Fête, its biggest annual event, which was held in the town's Maclaren Park. Several well-known artists in Quebec and in Canada, including Éric Lapointe, Marjo, Jean Leloup La Chicane, Amanda Marshall and April Wine, have performed over the years at the festival. However, due to financial difficulties, the festival nearly disappeared. According to the festival's website, the 17th edition in 2007 was still expected to go underway as planned. In 2016, the festival decided to end the celebration of the festivals with its 25th festival due to financial difficulties caused by the raining during the festival. Over its history, the festival has received numerous distinctions and awards both regionally and provincially.

== Mayors of Buckingham (1868–2001) ==
- James Wilson (1867–1871)
- McPherson LeMoine (1872–1873)
- John Cosgrove (1874–1876)
- H.H. Sauvé (1877–1878)
- James Maclaren (1879–1882)
- H.H. Sauvé (1883–1885)
- James Maclaren (1885–1886)
- George L. Parker (1887–1892)
- William J. MacKenzier (1893)
- James Martin (1894–1895)
- Alexander Maclaren (1896–1897)
- John Cosgrove (1898–1899)
- J. Palma Lahaie (1900–1901)
- John Edward Vallilee (1902–1906)
- William H. Kelly (1907–1908)
- Aristide M. LaPierre (1909–1910)
- John F. Higginson (1911–1918)
- Désiré Lahaie (1918–1926)
- F.C. Dunscombe (1926–1928)
- Aristide M. LaPierre (1928–1930)
- Wolfe J. Costello (1930–1932)
- Philoxime A. Fournier (1932–1944)
- Philias Matte (1944–1948)
- Elzéar Malette (1948–1950)
- Philias Matte (1950–1956)
- Arthur Latour (1956–1958)
- Reginald Cameron (1958–1962)
- Ulysse Tremblay (1962–1967)
- Roger D'Aoust (1967–1974)
- Reginald W. Scullion (1975–1995)
- Jacques Lareau (1995–1999)
- Jocelyne Houle (1999–2001)

== Education ==
The Western Québec School Board (WQSB) operates the only English public school in the sector which is Buckingham Elementary School. WQSB also operates the closest public English secondary schools which are Hadley Junior High School and Philemon Wright High School just over 30 minutes away in Gatineau, QC and accessible via school bus.

The Francophone school district Commission scolaire au Cœur-des-Vallées, headquartered in Buckingham, operates public schools in that district.

The closest Francophone CEGEP, Cégep de l'Outaouais, is located half an hour away, with two campuses in Gatineau and one in Hull. Located next to the CEGEP in Hull, the closest public English language College is Heritage College.

The Université du Québec en Outaouais has two pavilions in the Outaouais region, both located in Hull. Students wishing to pursue undergraduate studies also benefit from close proximity to University of Ottawa, although tuition fees tend to be much higher when compared to those in the province of Quebec for Quebec residents.

- Buckingham High School

== Health and social services ==
The Hôpital de Papineau is located on MacLaren East Street at the intersection of Bélanger Street. Services include outpatient clinics for mental health care, as well as many medical and surgical specialties such as internal medicine, orthopedics, general surgery and endoscopy. An emergency department with medical imaging and laboratory services is also available 24/7.

== Transportation ==
Société de transport de l'Outaouais (STO) is the transit service of the Outaouais region of Quebec. It operates conventional services and the Rapibus, a bus rapid transit service, in Gatineau, Quebec, including the districts of Hull, Aylmer, Gatineau, Buckingham and Masson-Angers. STO is located on the Quebec-side of Canada's National Capital Region, and operates several bus routes through Downtown Ottawa, Ontario.

== See also ==
- Municipal reorganization in Quebec
- List of former cities in Quebec
- Buckingham District – municipal electoral district coinciding with Buckingham
