= Masson-Angers =

- Sector within City of Gatineau
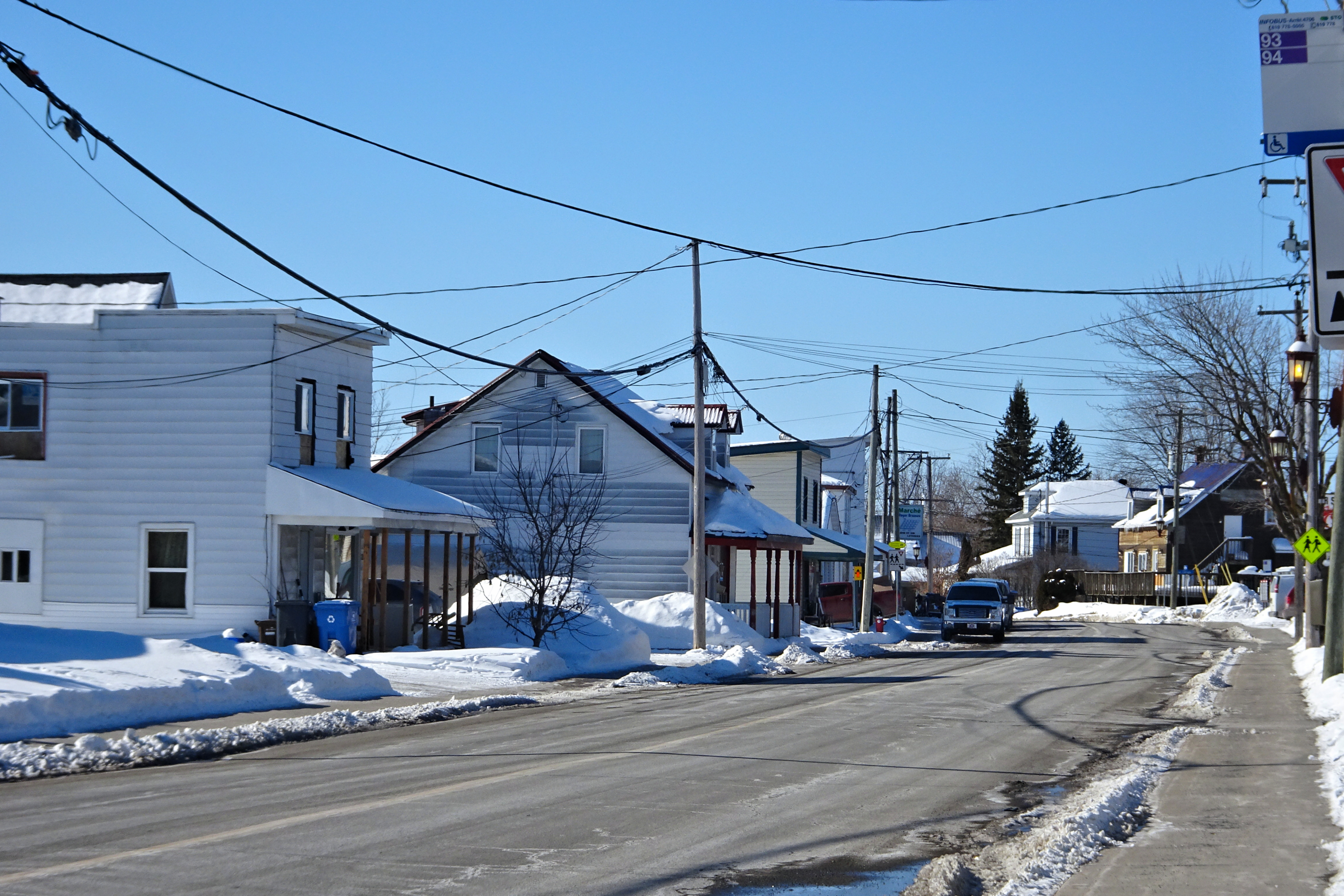
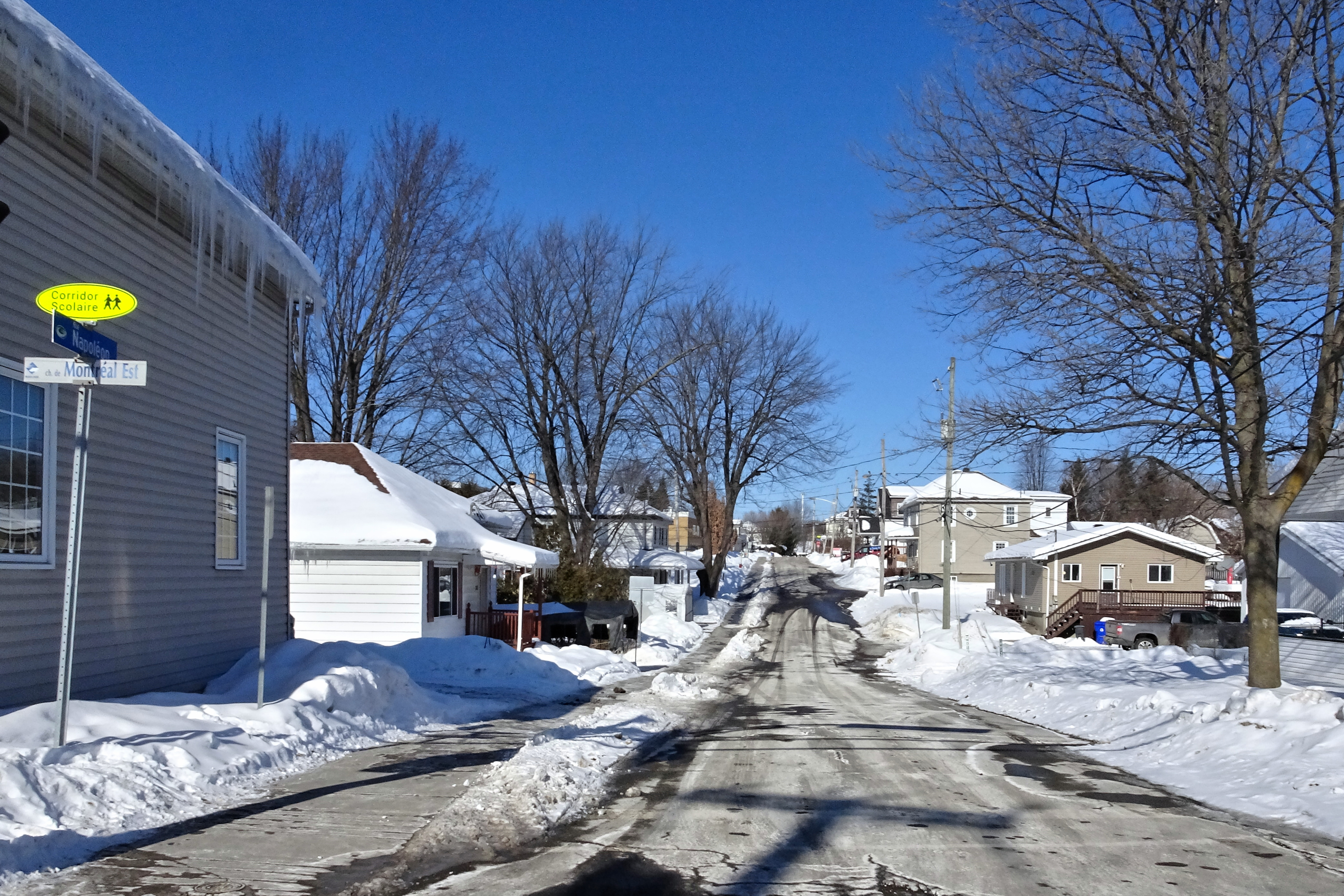
- Top: Angers; bottom: Masson
- Interactive map of Masson-Angers
- Coordinates: 45°32′N 75°25′W
- Country: Canada
- Province: Quebec
- Region: Outaouais
- City: Gatineau
- Incorporated: January 1, 1980
- Merged: January 1, 2002
- Time zone: UTC−05:00 (EST)
  - Summer (DST): UTC−04:00 (EST)
- Area codes: 819, 873
- Access routes: A-50 R-148

Masson-Angers is a former municipality and now a sector within the city of Gatineau. It is located on the north shore of the Ottawa River, in Quebec, Canada, approximately 30 km (18.6 mi) northeast of downtown Ottawa, Ontario. According to the Canada 2011 Census, Masson-Angers had a population of 12,397.

== History ==
The former municipality of Masson was created in 1897, while its neighbouring town, Angers, was created in 1915. The area was key for the lumber industry dominated by the MacLaren family in the early 20th century and a large mill was built in Masson near the Du Lièvre River. It was briefly merged with Buckingham in 1975 but later formed a new municipality with Angers which was now called Masson-Angers. On June 27, 1978, an F2 tornado swept through the eastern half of Masson causing extensive damage to the town.

On January 1, 2002, Masson-Angers was amalgamated into the newly created city of Gatineau. It had consisted of the communities of Masson and Angers.

A subsequent vote on June 20, 2004 for a demerger from Gatineau failed to restore the once incorporated town. The majority of the votes cast in Masson-Angers were in favour of separation from Gatineau, but they did not represent at least 35% of the electorate. However, current councillor Luc Montreuil disputed the result reversal mentioning that the electoral list was not updated correctly for the vote. After the reversal, the issue went to court.

Initially, the results showed that the sector would be removed from Gatineau by just two votes but a dispute on allegations that some people voted twice had caused the result to be reversed which caused the new result dispute by Luc Montreuil and his pro-defusion group.

In June 2008, the Quebec Superior Court concluded that there were no issues with the electoral list and thus Masson-Angers remained with the city of Gatineau. After the Court's decision the Collectif pour la reconstitution de Masson-Angers decided in July not to appeal the decision officially closing the referendum case.

== Features and facts ==
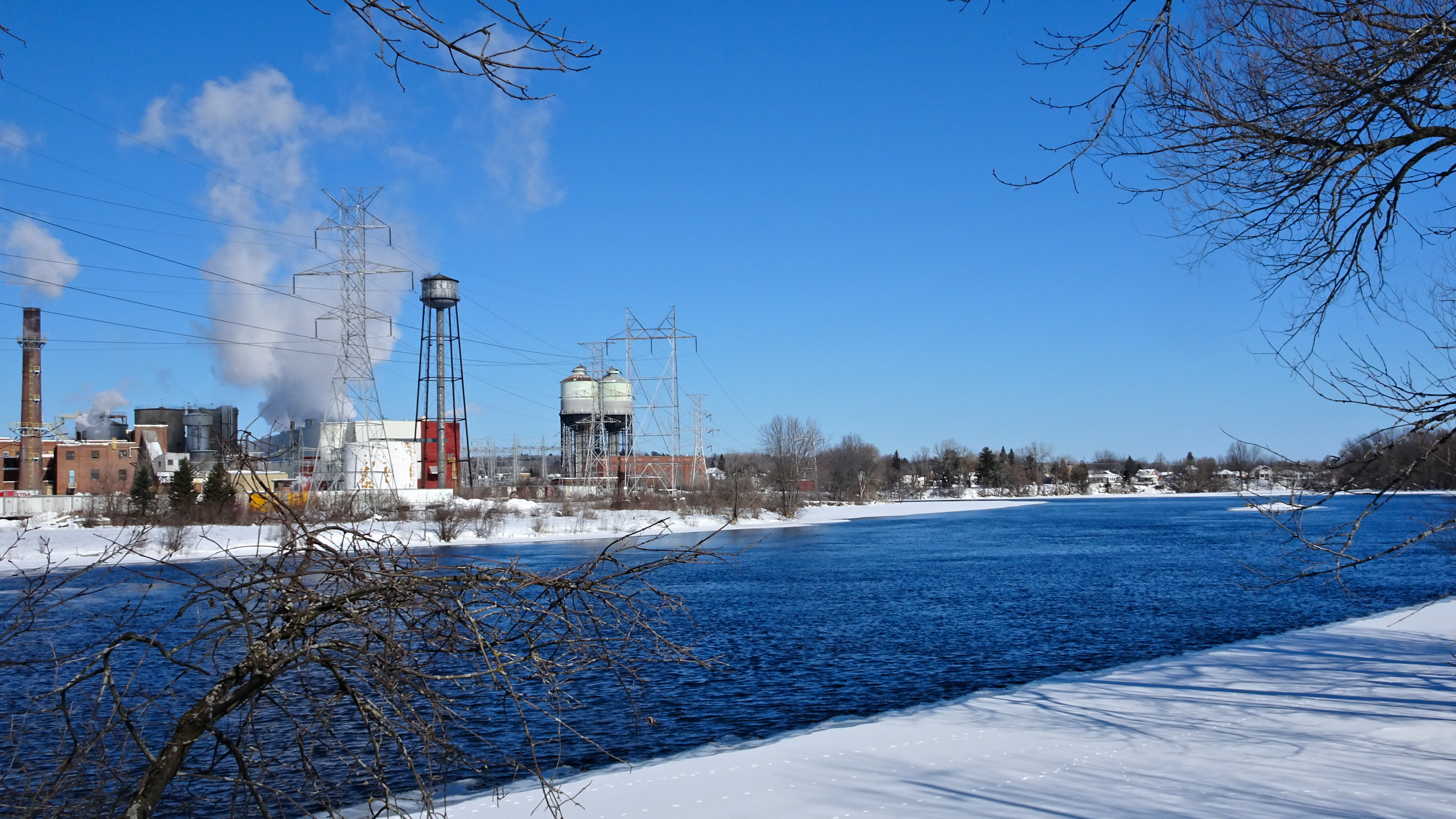
Mill and Du Lièvre River in Masson

- Public transportation is provided by the Société de transport de l'Outaouais and offers Route 94 during the morning peak period, and Route 93 during both peak periods. Route 95 also provides service, during both AM and PM peaks, to a small portion of the municipality. STO Route 97 offers service to Masson-Angers throughout the day- allowing for travel to both Gatineau and Buckingham.Route 148 and Autoroute 50 are the main highways in the sector
- The sector is home to the city's largest outdoor market the Encan Larose (Larose Market) which also has an indoor shopping centre and food court and other interior boutiques selling a variety of products.

== Education ==
The Commission scolaire au Cœur-des-Vallées operates Francophone public schools in this district.

== Healthcare and social services ==
The nearest healthcare facility is Hôpital de Papineau located in the nearby Buckingham sector. This community hospital offers emergency room services, consultations in several specialties such as psychiatry, internal medicine, general surgery, medical imaging, endoscopy, and cardiology, and also is capable of hospitalizing patients both on regular floors and in the intensive care unit. Since specialized services such as percutaneous coronary intervention (PCI) and neurosurgical interventions are not offered in Buckingham, multiple service corridors with Hôpital de Hull and Hôpital de Gatineau also exist.

== See also ==
- List of former cities in Quebec
- Municipal reorganization in Quebec
- Masson-Angers District - municipal electoral district mostly coinciding with Masson-Angers
- List of Canadian tornadoes and tornado outbreaks (before 2001)
