= 2014 HDF Insurance Shoot-Out =

World Curling Tour event

- Host city: Edmonton, Alberta
- Arena: Saville Community Sports Centre
- Dates: September 11–14
- Men's winner: (Alberta) Brendan Bottcher
- Curling club: Saville Community SC, Edmonton
- Skip: Brendan Bottcher
- Third: Tom Appelman
- Second: Bradley Thiessen
- Lead: Karrick Martin
- Finalist: (Saskatchewan) Steve Laycock
- Women's winner: (Alberta) Chelsea Carey
- Curling club: Saville Community SC, Edmonton
- Skip: Chelsea Carey
- Third: Laura Crocker
- Second: Taylor McDonald
- Lead: Jen Gates
- Finalist: (Alberta) Valerie Sweeting

The 2014 HDF Insurance Shoot-Out was held from September 11 to 14 at the Saville Community Sports Centre in Edmonton, Alberta. The event was held on Week 3 of the 2014–15 World Curling Tour. The men's event had a purse of CAD$22,000, and the women's event had a purse of CAD$27,000. The winning team in each event won CAD$6,000.

Local teams from Edmonton won both the men's and women's events. On the men's side, Brendan Bottcher's rink defeated Saskatchewan's Steve Laycock in an extra end. The women's side featured two Edmonton rinks, as Manitoba-transplant Chelsea Carey and her new team beat Valerie Sweeting to claim their first World Curling Tour title in their very first event as a team.

== Men ==
The men's event has a triple knockout format, followed by an eight-team playoff.

=== Teams ===
Teams are listed as follows:

Skip	Third	Second	Lead	Locale
Matthew Blandford	Darren Moulding	Brent Hamilton	Brad Chyz	Calgary, Alberta
Brendan Bottcher	Tom Appelman	Bradley Thiessen	Karrick Martin	Edmonton, Alberta
Brady Clark	Greg Persinger	Matt Birklid	Phil Tilker	(Washington (state)) Seattle, Washington
Warren Cross	Dean Darwent	Dwight Alfrey	Doug McNish	Edmonton, Alberta
Shawn Donnelly	Matthew Brown	Michael Hauer	Kenton Maschmeyer	Edmonton, Alberta
Jamie King	Jeff Erickson	Warren Hassall	Glen Kennedy	Edmonton, Alberta
Steve Laycock	Kirk Muyres	Colton Flasch	Dallan Muyres	Saskatoon, Saskatchewan
Mick Lizmore	Nathan Connolly	Parker Konschuh	Carter Lautner	Edmonton, Alberta
Sven Michel	Florian Meister	Simon Gempeler	Stefan Meienberg	Adelboden, Switzerland
James Pahl	Ted Appelman	Mark Klinck	Roland Robinson	Sherwood Park, Alberta
Robert Schlender	Kevin Park	Bert Martin	Josh Burns	Edmonton, Alberta
Thomas Scoffin	Aiden Procter	David Aho	Brayden Power	Edmonton, Alberta
Aaron Sluchinski	Justin Sluchinski	Dylan Webster	Eric Richard	Airdrie, Alberta
Thomas Usselman	Michael Roy	Taylor Ardiel	Curtis Der	Calgary, Alberta
Brock Virtue	Charley Thomas	Brandon Klassen	D. J. Kidby	Calgary, Alberta
Wade White	Kevin Tym	Dan Holowaychuk	George White	Edmonton, Alberta

=== Knockout results ===
==== A event ====
First Knockout		Semifinals		Qualifier 1
(Saskatchewan) Steve Laycock	6
(Alberta) Warren Cross	2	(Saskatchewan) Steve Laycock	2
(Alberta) Aaron Sluchinski	4	(Alberta) Jamie King	8
(Alberta) Jamie King	6			(Alberta) Jamie King	5
(Alberta) Brendan Bottcher	4			(Alberta) Brendan Bottcher	3
(Alberta) Shawn Donnelly	1	(Alberta) Brendan Bottcher	5
(Alberta) Brock Virtue	6	(Alberta) Brock Virtue	3
(Alberta) Thomas Scoffin	4

First Knockout		Semifinals		Qualifier 2
(Switzerland) Sven Michel	2
(Alberta) James Pahl	7	(Alberta) James Pahl	4
(Alberta) Mick Lizmore	7	(Alberta) Mick Lizmore	6
(Alberta) Robert Schlender	3			(Alberta) Mick Lizmore	4
(United States) Brady Clark	5			(Alberta) Matthew Blandford	5
(Alberta) Thomas Usselman	3	(United States) Brady Clark	7
(Alberta) Matthew Blandford	6	(Alberta) Matthew Blandford	8
(Alberta) Wade White	4

==== B event ====
Second Knockout
(Alberta) Warren Cross	3
(Alberta) Aaron Sluchinski	6
(Alberta) Shawn Donnelly	5
(Alberta) Thomas Scoffin	4

Quarterfinals
(United States) Brady Clark	5
(Alberta) Aaron Sluchinski	6
(Alberta) James Pahl	7
(Alberta) Shawn Donnelly	3

Semifinals
(Alberta) Aaron Sluchinski	7
(Alberta) James Pahl	2

Qualifier 3
(Alberta) Aaron Sluchinski	1
(Alberta) Mick Lizmore	6

Second Knockout
(Switzerland) Sven Michel	5
(Alberta) Robert Schlender	2
(Alberta) Thomas Usselman	4
(Alberta) Wade White	9

Quarterfinals
(Alberta) Brock Virtue	5
(Switzerland) Sven Michel	2
(Saskatchewan) Steve Laycock	8
(Alberta) Wade White	6

Semifinals
(Alberta) Brock Virtue	4
(Saskatchewan) Steve Laycock	3

Qualifier 3
(Alberta) Brock Virtue	5
(Alberta) Brendan Bottcher	2

==== C event ====
Third Knockout		Qualifier 5
(Alberta) Warren Cross	3
(Alberta) Thomas Scoffin	5	(Alberta) Thomas Scoffin	3
		(Saskatchewan) Steve Laycock	4

Third Knockout		Qualifier 6
(Switzerland) Sven Michel	6
(Alberta) Wade White	3	(Switzerland) Sven Michel	0
		(Alberta) Aaron Sluchinski	7

Third Knockout		Qualifier 7
(Alberta) Robert Schlender	8
(Alberta) Thomas Usselman	2	(Alberta) Robert Schlender	1
		(Alberta) James Pahl	5

Third Knockout		Qualifier 8
(United States) Brady Clark	5
(Alberta) Shawn Donnelly	7	(Alberta) Shawn Donnelly	0
		(Alberta) Brendan Bottcher	7

=== Playoffs ===
Quarterfinals
(Alberta) Matthew Blandford	3
(Alberta) James Pahl	6
(Alberta) Mick Lizmore	4
(Alberta) Brendan Bottcher	6
(Alberta) Jamie King	4
(Saskatchewan) Steve Laycock	5
(Alberta) Brock Virtue	7
(Alberta) Aaron Sluchinski	2

Semifinals
(Alberta) James Pahl	3
(Alberta) Brendan Bottcher	4
(Saskatchewan) Steve Laycock	7
(Alberta) Brock Virtue	5

Final
(Alberta) Brendan Bottcher	7
(Saskatchewan) Steve Laycock	6

== Women ==
The women's event is a round robin with four pools followed by an eight-team playoff.

=== Teams ===
Teams are listed as follows:

Skip	Third	Second	Lead	Locale
Brett Barber	Samantha Yachiw	Meaghan Frerichs	Kaitlyn Bowman	Biggar, Saskatchewan
Chelsea Carey	Laura Crocker	Taylor McDonald	Jen Gates	Edmonton, Alberta
Nadine Chyz	Heather Jensen	Whitney Eckstrand	Heather Rogers	Calgary, Alberta
Delia DeJong	Amy Janko	Lindsay Janko	Janais DeJong	Grande Prairie, Alberta
Brenda Doroshuk	Erica Ortt	Brittany Whittemore	Tammy Kaufman	Edmonton, Alberta
Chantelle Eberle	Cindy Ricci	Larisa Murray	Debbie Lozinski	Regina, Saskatchewan
Kerri Einarson	Selena Kaatz	Liz Fyfe	Kristin MacCuish	Winnipeg, Manitoba
Karynn Flory	Richelle Baer	Amanda Moizis	Katie Roskewich	Edmonton, Alberta
Tiffany Game	Vanessa Pouliot	Jennifer Van Wieren	Melissa Pierce	Crestwood, Alberta
Teryn Hamilton	Kalynn Park	Michelle Dykstra	Amber Cheveldave	Calgary, Alberta
Michèle Jäggi	Michelle Gribi	Stéphanie Jäggi	Vera Camponovo	Bern, Switzerland
Sherry Just	Alyssa Despins	Jenna Harrison	Michelle Johnson	Saskatoon, Saskatchewan
Nicky Kaufman	Holly Whyte	Deena Benoit	Pam Appelman	Edmonton, Alberta
Kristie Moore	Sarah Wilkes	Kristina Hadden	Alison Kotylak	Edmonton, Alberta
Heather Nedohin	Amy Nixon	Jessica Mair	Laine Peters	Edmonton, Alberta
Susan O'Connor	Lawnie MacDonald	Denise Kinghorn	Cori Morris	Calgary, Alberta
Cissi Östlund	Sabina Kraupp	Sara Carlsson	Paulina Stein	Karlstad, Sweden
Alina Pätz	Nadine Lehmann	Marisa Winkelhausen	Nicole Schwägli	Baden, Switzerland
Trish Paulsen	Kari Kennedy	Jenna Loder	Kari Paulsen	Saskatoon, Saskatchewan
Kelsey Rocque	Keely Brown	Taylore Theroux	Claire Tully	Edmonton, Alberta
Leslie Rogers	Sheri Pickering	Kathleen Dunbar	Jenilee Goertzen	Edmonton, Alberta
Casey Scheidegger	Cary-Anne McTaggart	Jessie Scheidegger	Brittany Tran	Lethbridge, Alberta
Valerie Sweeting	Andrea Crawford	Dana Ferguson	Rachelle Pidherny	Edmonton, Alberta
Jessie Kaufman (fourth)	Crystal Webster (skip)	Geri-Lynn Ramsay	Rebecca Konschuh	Calgary, Alberta

=== Round-robin standings ===
After Draw 9

Green Pool	W	L
(Alberta) Valerie Sweeting	5	0
(Alberta) Kristie Moore	4	1
(Saskatchewan) Chantelle Eberle	2	3
(Alberta) Leslie Rogers	2	3
(Sweden) Cecilia Östlund	1	4
(Alberta) Brenda Doroshuk	1	4

Grey Pool	W	L
(Alberta) Heather Nedohin	4	1
(Alberta) Casey Scheidegger	4	1
(Saskatchewan) Brett Barber	3	2
(Alberta) Crystal Webster	2	3
(Alberta) Teryn Hamilton	1	4
(Alberta) Karynn Flory	1	4

Gold Pool	W	L
(Alberta) Susan O'Connor	4	1
(Switzerland) Alina Pätz	4	1
(Saskatchewan) Trish Paulsen	3	2
(Alberta) Nadine Chyz	3	2
(Saskatchewan) Sherry Just	1	4
(Alberta) Tiffany Game	0	5

Black Pool	W	L
(Switzerland) Michèle Jäggi	5	0
(Alberta) Chelsea Carey	4	1
(Alberta) Nicky Kaufman	2	3
(Manitoba) Kerri Einarson	2	3
(Alberta) Delia DeJong	1	4
(Alberta) Kelsey Rocque	1	4

=== Playoffs ===
Quarterfinals
(Alberta) Valerie Sweeting	5
(Switzerland) Alina Pätz	4
(Alberta) Susan O'Connor	6
(Alberta) Casey Scheidegger	4
(Switzerland) Michèle Jäggi	4
(Alberta) Kristie Moore	8
(Alberta) Heather Nedohin	2
(Alberta) Chelsea Carey	6

Semifinals
(Alberta) Valerie Sweeting	6
(Alberta) Susan O'Connor	3
(Alberta) Kristie Moore	2
(Alberta) Chelsea Carey	5

Final
(Alberta) Valerie Sweeting	3
(Alberta) Chelsea Carey	5
