= 2016 Boston Pizza Cup =

- Host city: Camrose, Alberta
- Arena: Encana Arena
- Dates: February 10–14
- Winner: Kevin Koe
- Curling club: The Glencoe Club, Calgary
- Skip: Kevin Koe
- Third: Marc Kennedy
- Second: Brent Laing
- Lead: Ben Hebert
- Finalist: Charley Thomas

The 2016 Boston Pizza Cup was held from February 10 to 14 at the Encana Arena in Camrose, Alberta. The winning Kevin Koe rink represented Alberta at the 2016 Tim Hortons Brier in Ottawa. Koe's rink went on to win the Brier, his third Brier championship as skip.

== Qualification process ==
Twelve teams qualified for the provincial tournament through several methods. The qualification process is as follows:

Qualification method	Berths	Qualifying team
Defending champion from previous year	1	Kevin Koe
Highest-ranked team on CTRS not already qualified	1	Charley Thomas
Alberta Curling Federation bonspiel points	2	Mick Lizmore; Brendan Bottcher
Peace Curling Association qualifier (Jan. 15–17)	2	Tom Sallows; Greg Pasichnuk
Northern Alberta Curling Association qualifier (Jan. 14–17)	3	Jeff Erickson; Greg Hansen; Warren Cross
Southern Alberta Curling Association qualifier (Jan. 15–18)	3	Brent Bawel; Kevin Park; Kevin Yablonski

== Teams ==
Skip	Third	Second	Lead	Alternate	Locale(s)
Brent Bawel	Lyle Kent	Byron Wickerson	Nathan Relitz		Airdrie Curling Club, Airdrie
Brendan Bottcher	Tom Appelman	Bradley Thiessen	Karrick Martin		Saville Sports Centre, Edmonton
Warren Cross	Dean Darwent	Jeremy Hodges	Cody Bartlett		Saville Sports Centre, Edmonton
Jeff Erickson	Dustin Eckstrand	Shaun Planaden	Scott Cruickshank		Sedgewick Curling Club, Sedgewick
Glen Hansen	Doug McLennan	Don Bartlett	George Parsons		St. Albert Curling Club, St. Albert
Kevin Koe	Marc Kennedy	Brent Laing	Ben Hebert		Glencoe Curling Club, Calgary
Mick Lizmore	Daylan Vavrek	Brad Chyz	Carter Lautner		Saville Sports Centre, Edmonton
Kevin Park	Brock Virtue	Adam Norget	Dylan Webster	Mike Neufeld	Lethbridge Curling Club, Lethbridge
Greg Pasichnuk	James Knievel	Kevin Albrecht	Chad Krantz	Evan Asmussen	Manning Curling Club, Manning
Jordan Steinke (fourth)	Tom Sallows (skip)	Mark Pillsworth	Kendall Warawa		Grande Prairie Curling Club, Grande Prairie
Charley Thomas	Nathan Connolly	Brandon Klassen	D. J. Kidby		Glencoe Curling Club, Calgary; Crestwood Curling Club, Calgary
Kevin Yablonski	Michael Roy	Scott Garrett	Matthew McDonald		Glencoe Curling Club, Calgary

== Knockout Draw Brackets ==
The draw is listed as follows:

=== A event ===
First Knockout
Brent Bawel	7
Warren Cross	6
Kevin Park	2
Greg Pasichnuk	8
Jeff Erickson	7
Kevin Yablonski	8
Tom Sallows	7
Glen Hansen	5

Quarterfinals
Kevin Koe	8
Brent Bawel	2
Greg Pasichnuk	3
Mick Lizmore	8
Charley Thomas	7
Kevin Yablonski	2
Tom Sallows	2
Brendan Bottcher	9

Semifinals
Kevin Koe	4
Mick Lizmore	6
Charley Thomas	8
Brendan Bottcher	7

Qualifier 1
Mick Lizmore	1
Charley Thomas	7

=== B event ===
Second Knockout
Greg Pasichnuk	7
Warren Cross	6
Kevin Yablonski	7
Kevin Park	8
Tom Sallows	7
Jeff Erickson	8
Brent Bawel	5
Glen Hansen	7

Quarterfinals
Greg Pasichnuk	2
Brendan Bottcher	12
Kevin Park	1
Kevin Koe	7
Jeff Erickson	5
Glen Hansen	9

Semifinals
Brendan Bottcher	3
Kevin Koe	8
Glen Hansen	7
Mick Lizmore	8

Qualifier 2
Kevin Koe	6
Mick Lizmore	1

=== C event ===
Third Knockout		Semifinals		Qualifier 3
		Kevin Yablonski	9
Warren Cross	5	Glen Hansen	4
Kevin Yablonski	9			Kevin Yablonski	3
				Brendan Bottcher	10
		Jeff Erickson	4
		Brendan Bottcher	6

Third Knockout		Semifinals		Qualifier 4
Tom Sallows	11
Greg Pasichnuk	6	Tom Sallows	2
Brent Bawel	9	Brent Bawel	9
Kevin Park	5			Brent Bawel	4
				Mick Lizmore	7

== Knockout results ==
=== Draw 1 ===
Wednesday, February 10, 9:30 am

Sheet A	1	2	3	4	5	6	7	8	9	10	Final
Kevin Park 🔨	0	0	0	0	0	2	0	0	X	X	2
Greg Pasichnuk	0	0	1	3	1	0	2	1	X	X	8

Sheet B	1	2	3	4	5	6	7	8	9	10	Final
Jeff Erickson	0	3	0	3	0	0	0	1	0	0	7
Kevin Yablonski 🔨	1	0	1	0	0	2	1	0	2	1	8

Sheet C	1	2	3	4	5	6	7	8	9	10	Final
Tom Sallows 🔨	1	0	2	0	1	1	1	1	0	X	7
Glen Hansen	0	2	0	2	0	0	0	0	1	X	5

Sheet D	1	2	3	4	5	6	7	8	9	10	Final
Brent Bawel	0	1	0	1	2	0	1	0	0	2	7
Warren Cross 🔨	2	0	2	0	0	0	0	1	1	0	6

=== Draw 2 ===
Wednesday, February 10, 6:30 pm

Team	1	2	3	4	5	6	7	8	9	10	Final
Kevin Koe 🔨	1	0	3	0	0	4	X	X	X	X	8
Brent Bawel	0	1	0	1	0	0	X	X	X	X	2

Team	1	2	3	4	5	6	7	8	9	10	Final
Greg Pasichnuk	0	0	0	0	2	1	0	0	X	X	3
Mick Lizmore 🔨	2	1	3	1	0	0	1	0	X	X	8

Team	1	2	3	4	5	6	7	8	9	10	Final
Charley Thomas	0	0	0	2	0	1	1	3	X	X	7
Kevin Yablonski 🔨	0	0	2	0	0	0	0	0	X	X	2

Team	1	2	3	4	5	6	7	8	9	10	Final
Tom Sallows	0	0	1	0	1	0	X	X	X	X	2
Brendan Bottcher 🔨	0	3	0	4	0	2	X	X	X	X	9

=== Draw 3 ===
Thursday, February 11, 9:00 am

Sheet B	1	2	3	4	5	6	7	8	9	10	11	Final
Kevin Koe	0	0	0	1	0	1	0	1	0	1	0	4
Mick Lizmore 🔨	0	0	1	0	1	0	2	0	0	0	2	6

Sheet D	1	2	3	4	5	6	7	8	9	10	11	Final
Charley Thomas 🔨	2	0	2	0	0	1	0	0	2	0	1	8
Brendan Bottcher	0	1	0	0	3	0	2	0	0	1	0	7

=== Draw 4 ===
Thursday, February 11, 2:00 pm

Sheet A	1	2	3	4	5	6	7	8	9	10	Final
Greg Pasichnuk 🔨	0	1	0	2	0	0	3	0	1	0	7
Warren Cross	1	0	0	0	2	1	0	1	0	1	6

Sheet B	1	2	3	4	5	6	7	8	9	10	11	Final
Kevin Yablonski	0	0	1	0	3	0	1	0	2	0	0	7
Kevin Park 🔨	1	0	0	1	0	3	0	1	0	1	1	8

Sheet C	1	2	3	4	5	6	7	8	9	10	Final
Tom Sallows	0	2	0	0	1	0	2	0	2	0	7
Jeff Erickson 🔨	1	0	0	2	0	1	0	2	0	2	8

Sheet D	1	2	3	4	5	6	7	8	9	10	Final
Brent Bawel 🔨	1	1	0	0	1	0	0	2	0	0	5
Glen Hansen	0	0	3	1	0	0	2	0	0	1	7

=== Draw 5 ===
Thursday, February 11, 6:30 pm

Sheet A	1	2	3	4	5	6	7	8	9	10	Final
Jeff Erickson 🔨	2	1	0	0	2	0	0	0	0	0	5
Glen Hansen	0	0	0	4	0	1	0	1	1	2	9

Sheet B	1	2	3	4	5	6	7	8	9	10	Final
Greg Pasichnuk	0	0	0	0	2	0	X	X	X	X	2
Brendan Bottcher 🔨	3	2	1	3	0	3	X	X	X	X	12

Sheet C	1	2	3	4	5	6	7	8	9	10	Final
Mick Lizmore	0	0	0	0	0	1	X	X	X	X	1
Charley Thomas 🔨	1	2	1	2	1	0	X	X	X	X	7

Sheet D	1	2	3	4	5	6	7	8	9	10	Final
Kevin Park	0	0	0	1	0	0	X	X	X	X	1
Kevin Koe 🔨	1	1	2	0	1	2	X	X	X	X	7

=== Draw 6 ===
Friday, February 12, 9:00 am

Sheet A	1	2	3	4	5	6	7	8	9	10	Final
Tom Sallows 🔨	2	0	2	0	1	0	3	0	3	X	11
Greg Pasichnuk	0	1	0	3	0	0	0	2	0	X	6

Sheet B	1	2	3	4	5	6	7	8	9	10	Final
Brent Bawel 🔨	2	0	1	0	3	0	2	0	1	X	9
Kevin Park	0	0	0	2	0	2	0	1	0	X	5

Sheet C	1	2	3	4	5	6	7	8	9	10	Final
Warren Cross	0	0	3	0	1	0	0	1	0	X	5
Kevin Yablonski 🔨	0	1	0	2	0	1	2	0	3	X	9

=== Draw 7 ===
Friday, February 12, 2:00 pm

Sheet A	1	2	3	4	5	6	7	8	9	10	Final
Brendan Bottcher	0	0	1	0	0	2	X	X	X	X	3
Kevin Koe 🔨	1	2	0	0	5	0	X	X	X	X	8

Sheet B	1	2	3	4	5	6	7	8	9	10	Final
Glen Hansen	0	0	2	1	0	1	0	3	0	0	7
Mick Lizmore 🔨	2	1	0	0	0	0	1	0	2	2	8

=== Draw 8 ===
Friday, February 6, 6:30 pm

Sheet A	1	2	3	4	5	6	7	8	9	10	Final
Kevin Koe 🔨	0	1	0	2	0	0	3	X	X	X	6
Mick Lizmore	0	0	0	0	1	0	0	X	X	X	1

Sheet B	1	2	3	4	5	6	7	8	9	10	Final
Jeff Erickson 🔨	0	1	0	0	1	0	0	0	2	0	4
Brendan Bottcher	0	0	2	1	0	1	0	1	0	1	6

Sheet C	1	2	3	4	5	6	7	8	9	10	Final
Kevin Yablonski 🔨	1	0	2	2	1	0	0	3	X	X	9
Glen Hansen	0	3	0	0	0	1	0	0	X	X	4

Sheet D	1	2	3	4	5	6	7	8	9	10	Final
Brent Bawel 🔨	1	0	2	3	0	1	2	X	X	X	9
Tom Sallows	0	1	0	0	1	0	0	X	X	X	2

=== Draw 9 ===
Saturday, February 7, 1:00 pm

Sheet B	1	2	3	4	5	6	7	8	9	10	Final
Kevin Yablonski 🔨	0	0	1	0	1	0	0	1	0	X	3
Brendan Bottcher	0	0	0	1	0	2	2	0	5	X	10

Sheet D	1	2	3	4	5	6	7	8	9	10	Final
Brent Bawel	0	0	1	0	1	0	1	0	1	0	4
Mick Lizmore 🔨	0	2	0	1	0	1	0	1	0	2	7

== Playoffs ==
Page playoff system
A	Charley Thomas	7
B	Kevin Koe	5
C1	Brendan Bottcher	5
C2	Mick Lizmore	2

Semifinal
B	Kevin Koe	7
C1	Brendan Bottcher	4

Final
A	Charley Thomas	4
B	Kevin Koe	8

=== A vs. B ===
Saturday, February 13, 6:30 pm

Sheet C	1	2	3	4	5	6	7	8	9	10	11	Final
Charley Thomas 🔨	0	0	2	0	1	0	0	0	2	0	2	7
Kevin Koe	0	1	0	1	0	0	0	1	0	2	0	5

=== C1 vs. C2 ===
Saturday, February 13, 6:30 pm

Sheet A	1	2	3	4	5	6	7	8	9	10	Final
Brendan Bottcher 🔨	0	1	0	0	0	4	0	0	0	X	5
Mick Lizmore	0	0	0	1	0	0	0	0	1	X	2

=== Semifinal ===
Sunday, February 14, 9:30 am

Sheet C	1	2	3	4	5	6	7	8	9	10	Final
Kevin Koe 🔨	0	1	0	3	0	0	2	0	1	X	7
Brendan Bottcher	0	0	2	0	2	0	0	0	0	X	4

=== Final ===
Sunday, February 14, 2:00 pm

Sheet C	1	2	3	4	5	6	7	8	9	10	Final
Charley Thomas 🔨	0	2	0	0	1	0	1	0	0	X	4
Kevin Koe	1	0	3	0	0	1	0	1	2	X	8

2016 Boston Pizza Cup

Kevin Koe
5th Alberta Provincial Championship title
