= Sarah Wilkes =

Canadian curler (born 1990)

- Curler
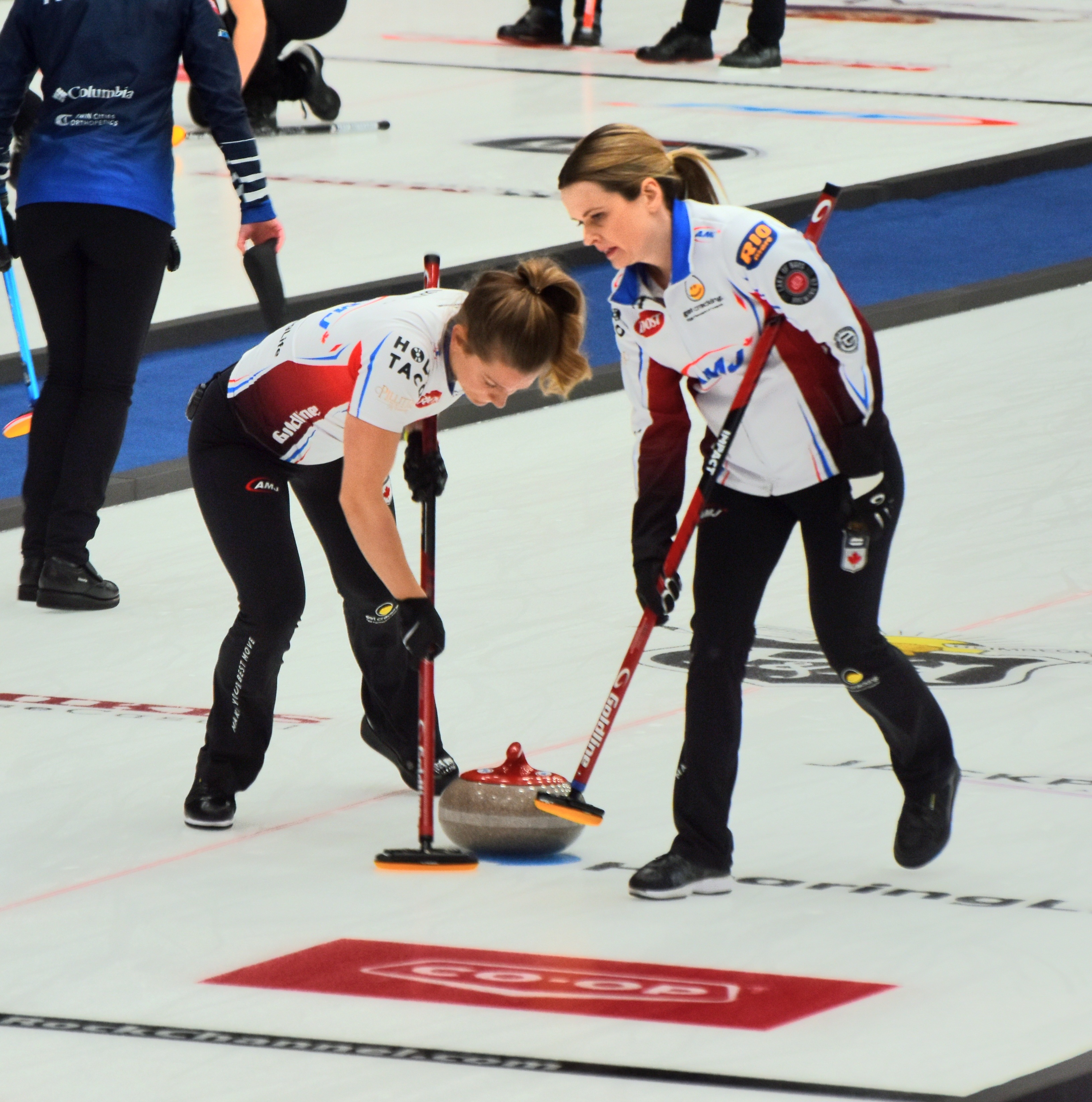
- Other names: Sarah Wilkes-Lizmore
- Born: August 4, 1990 (age 36); Toronto, Ontario, Canada

Team
- Curling club: Ottawa CC, Ottawa, ON
- Skip: Rachel Homan
- Third: Tracy Fleury
- Second: Emma Miskew
- Lead: Sarah Wilkes
- Alternate: Rachelle Brown

Curling career
- Member Association: Ontario (2008–2012; 2020–present); Alberta (2012–2020)
- Hearts: 9 (2015, 2017, 2019, 2020, 2021, 2022, 2023, 2024, 2025)
- World Championship: 3 (2019, 2024, 2025)
- Pan Continental Championship: 2 (2024, 2025)
- Olympic: 1 (2026)
- Top CTRS ranking: 1st (2023–24, 2024–25, 2025–26)
- Grand Slam victories: 10 (2017 Champions Cup, 2021 Champions Cup, 2022 Tour Challenge, 2023 Masters, 2024 Canadian Open (Jan.), 2024 Canadian Open (Nov.), 2024 National, 2025 Masters (Sept.), 2025 Tour Challenge, 2025 GSOC Tahoe)
Medal record
Women's curling
Representing Canada
Olympic Games
Bronze medal – third place	2026 Milano Cortina	Team
World Curling Championships
Gold medal – first place	2024 Sydney
Gold medal – first place	2025 Uijeongbu
Pan Continental Curling Championships
Gold medal – first place	2024 Lacombe
Silver medal – second place	2025 Virginia
Scotties Tournament of Hearts
Gold medal – first place	2025 Thunder Bay
Representing Alberta
Scotties Tournament of Hearts
Gold medal – first place	2019 Sydney
Silver medal – second place	2015 Moose Jaw
Representing Ontario
Canadian Olympic Curling Trials
Gold medal – first place	2025 Halifax
Scotties Tournament of Hearts
Gold medal – first place	2024 Calgary
Silver medal – second place	2021 Calgary

Sarah Wilkes (born August 4, 1990, in Toronto, Ontario) is a Canadian curler from London, Ontario. She is currently the lead for Team Rachel Homan. She won the 2024 Scotties, 2025 Scotties, 2024 World and 2025 World title and bronze medal in 2026 Winter Olympics with team Homan. She previously won the 2019 Scotties Tournament of Hearts with Team Chelsea Carey.

== Career ==
=== Juniors ===
As a junior curler, Wilkes played third for the 2011 Ontario Junior Women's Championship team skipped by Clancy Grandy. The team represented Ontario at the 2011 Canadian Junior Curling Championships, where they finished with a 5–7 record.

In University curling, Wilkes played third for the Wilfrid Laurier University women's curling team. She played in the 2010 CIS/CCA Curling Championships on a team skipped by Danielle Inglis, losing in the semi-final. Laurier would then win the 2011 and 2012 CIS/CCA Curling Championships under skip Laura Crocker. The team represented Canada at the 2013 Winter Universiade, but they finished off the podium with a 4–5 round robin record.

=== Women's ===
After university, Wilkes and Crocker moved to Alberta. They would play in the 2013 Alberta Scotties Tournament of Hearts, losing in the semifinal. The next season, Wilkes joined the Kristie Moore rink. Wilkes was invited to join the Alberta team, skipped by Val Sweeting at the 2015 Scotties Tournament of Hearts. The team would lose in the final.

Wilkes joined the Shannon Kleibrink rink in 2015 at second position. In their first season, the team would win the Medicine Hat Charity Classic and play in the 2016 Alberta Scotties Tournament of Hearts, where they narrowly missed the playoffs when they lost the final qualification game. The next season they would go on to win the 2017 Alberta Scotties Tournament of Hearts, earning the right to represent Alberta at the 2017 Scotties Tournament of Hearts. At the hearts, the team finished with a 5–6 record, failing to qualify for the playoffs. In 2018 Wilkes lost the Alberta Jiffy Lube Scotties final to Casey Scheidegger 7–6 in an extra end.

After the season, Wilkes joined the Carey team including Chelsea Carey, Dana Ferguson and Rachelle Brown, playing out of The Glencoe Club in Calgary. Leading up to Alberta provincials, the team had two playoff appearances at Grand Slam of Curling events including a semifinal finish at the Masters. Team Carey qualified for the 2019 Alberta Scotties Tournament of Hearts as the CTRS leaders from the tour season. They qualified for the playoffs as the "A Qualifier" after defeating Casey Scheidegger's rink 7–2. They defeated the Kelsey Rocque rink in the A vs. B playoff game 10–2 and would go on to beat them in the final 8–3 after Carey made a double for four in the ninth end. Representing Alberta at the 2019 Scotties Tournament of Hearts, they went 7–0 through the round robin and finished the championship pool with a 9–2 record which made them the number one seed going into the playoffs. Alberta defeated Saskatchewan's Robyn Silvernagle rink in the 1 vs. 2 game 11–7 and would face Ontario's Rachel Homan rink in the final. Team Carey made history when they came back from a 1–5 deficit to win the championship 8–6 with a total of five stolen points and two missed draws by Homan in the 10th and 11th ends. At the 2019 World Women's Curling Championship, the team struggled and were the first Canadian women's team not to make the playoffs at the championship in twenty years. They finished the season with a quarterfinal finish at the 2019 Players' Championship and by missing the playoffs at the 2019 Champions Cup.

Team Carey did not have a strong start to the Grand Slam season, only making the playoffs at one of the first four events, the National. They had a strong week at the 2019 Canada Cup going 4–2 through the round robin, qualifying for the playoffs. In the semifinal, they lost to the Tracy Fleury rink 9–4. At the 2020 Scotties Tournament of Hearts, Team Carey led Team Canada to a 5–6 record, missing the playoffs and settling for seventh place. It would be the team's last event of the season as both the Players' Championship and the Champions Cup Grand Slam events were cancelled due to the COVID-19 pandemic. On March 13, 2020, Wilkes announced she would be parting ways with the team. Three days later, Ferguson and Brown announced they would be leaving and the team officially disbanded. On March 17, 2020, Team Rachel Homan announced that Wilkes would be joining the team with the departure of Lisa Weagle. Wilkes would play second, with Joanne Courtney moving to lead and Emma Miskew playing third. Wilkes previously spared for the team at the 2017 Humpty's Champions Cup Grand Slam where they won the event.

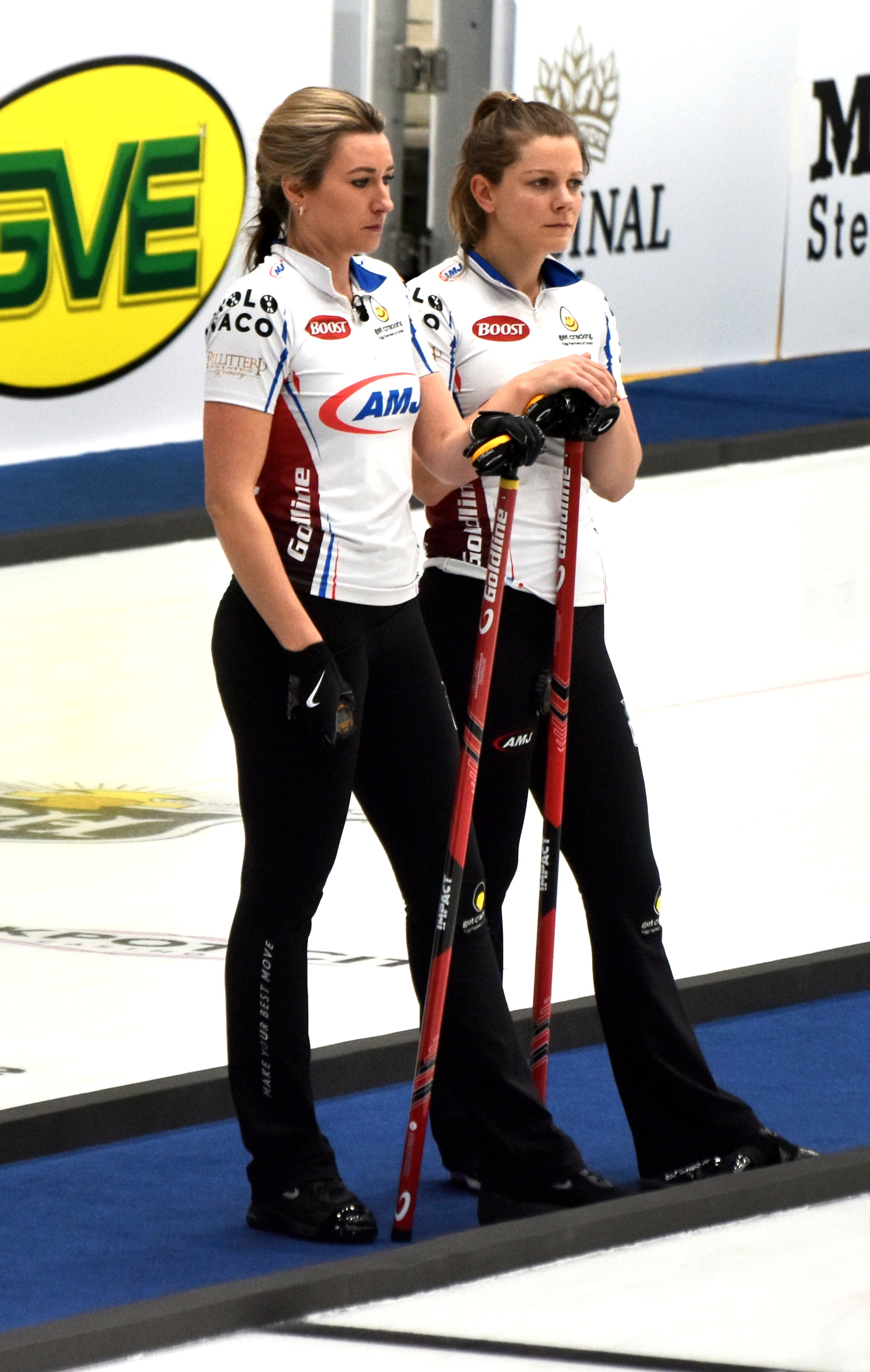
Wilkes (right) with Emma Miskew.

Homan's team was chosen to represent Ontario at the 2021 Scotties Tournament of Hearts in Calgary. Up to that point, they had only played in one tour game the entire season in the Okotoks Ladies Classic in November, before that event was cancelled due to a province-wide shutdown in Alberta. At the Scotties, they had a successful round robin, with a 7–1 record, including a win against defending champion Kerri Einarson. They entered the championship pool as the first seed, where they won three games and lost one to Manitoba's Jennifer Jones. Because of their earlier win against Einarson, Homan's team received a bye to the final. There, they lost 9–7 to Einarson after Homan missed a freeze in the last end, resulting in Einarson not needing to throw her last rock. Team Homan returned to the bubble in April 2021 to play in the two only Grand Slam events of the abbreviated season. At the first Slam, the 2021 Champions Cup, the team defeated Silvana Tirinzoni to win the event. A week later, they played in the 2021 Players' Championship, where they lost in the final to Team Einarson in a re-match of the Scotties final.

Team Homan made it to the quarterfinals of their first slam of the year, the 2021 Masters, where they were beaten by Alina Kovaleva. Two weeks later, they played in the 2021 National, where they were eliminated in the quarters again, this time by Anna Hasselborg. Next for Team Homan was the 2021 Canadian Olympic Curling Trials where they attempted to qualify for the Olympics again. The team, however, did not have a successful week, finishing with a 2–6 record. Team Homan's record over the season was not good enough to give them an automatic qualifying spot at the 2022 Ontario Scotties Tournament of Hearts, forcing them to play in an open qualifier. The team did qualify at the Open Qualifier, but the Ontario Scotties were postponed due to new COVID-19 regulations put into place by the province, shutting down sports event. With the postponement of the Ontario Scotties, CurlON announced that they would be selecting Team Hollie Duncan over Team Homan to represent Ontario if Homan was selected to represent Canada in the mixed doubles event at the 2022 Olympics (as the Trials had been cancelled). However, if Homan wasn't selected, then CurlON would select Team Homan to play in the Scotties instead. This plan of action was considered confusion and disappointing to the teams involved. Homan would end up being selected to represent Canada at the Olympics, giving Team Duncan the right to represent Ontario at the 2022 Scotties. However, the rest of Team Homan qualified for the Scotties as Team Wild Card #3. For the Tournament of Hearts, Wilkes, Emma Miskew and Joanne Courtney added Allison Flaxey to their lineup. At the championship, the team finished with a 4–4 round robin record, not advancing to the playoff round. Team Homan had to wait until April 2022 to play in the postponed Ontario Hearts, which they ended up winning, beating Carly Howard in the final. The team wrapped up their season with the two final slams, making it to the semifinals at the 2022 Players' Championship where they lost to Anna Hasselborg, and the quarters of the 2022 Champions Cup, where they lost to Kerri Einarson. In March 2022, after Joanne Courtney announced she would be stepping back from competitive curling, it was announced that Tracy Fleury would be joining the team for the 2022–23 season. With the addition of Fleury on the back-end, Miskew shifted down to play second while Wilkes moved to the lead position.

In August 2022, it was announced that Tracy Fleury would be skipping Team Homan, with Rachel Homan continuing to throw last rocks on the team. The new lineup made their debut at the 2022 Saville Shoot-Out, making it to the final before losing to Jennifer Jones and her new team. Later on in the month, Team Homan played in the inaugural PointsBet Invitational tournament organized by Curling Canada. The team made it to the quarterfinals, where they lost to Team Scheidegger, which was skipped by Kristie Moore in a draw-to-the button to break a 6–6 tie. The next month in October, the team played in the first Slam of the season, the 2022 National. There, the team made it to the quarterfinals before losing out to another new-look team skipped by Kaitlyn Lawes. Later that month, the team played in the next Slam, the 2022 Tour Challenge. The team won the event, defeating Kerri Einarson 8–4 in the final. In November, the team won their second Tour event of the season at the Red Deer Curling Classic, defeating Casey Scheidegger in the final. In December, the team played in their third Slam of the season, the 2022 Masters. The team made it to the final against Team Einarson again, but this time Einarson had the best of them, beating Team Homan 6–5 in an extra end. In January, the team played in the 2023 Canadian Open, making it as far as the quarterfinals this time before matching up against Einarson. Team Homan couldn't get past Einarson again, and were eliminated after a 7–2 decision. Later in the month, the team won the 2023 Ontario Scotties Tournament of Hearts. They defeated Hollie Duncan in the final. The team represented Ontario at the 2023 Scotties Tournament of Hearts, going 6–2 in pool play. This put the team into the Championship round, where they were eliminated after a loss to Nova Scotia, skipped by Christina Black. In April, Team Homan played in the 2023 Players' Championship, missing the playoffs, but rebounded to win the 2023 Champions Cup to cap off the season. Wilkes did not play with the team during the Champions Cup as she was on maternity leave. She was replaced by Rachelle Brown.

At the beginning of the 2023–24 season, it was announced that Homan would take over as skip of the team, with Fleury taking on regular third duties. The team also brought in former World Men's Champion and Olympic silver medallist Don Bartlett as their coach. The team began the season without Homan, who had just given birth to her third child. With Heather Nedohin in her place, the team went on to win the 2023 Saville Shootout. Homan returned to her team for the 2023 PointsBet Invitational, where they made it to the final, beating Kerri Einarson there 9–7 to claim the title, and $50,000 in the process. Three weeks later, Team Homan played in their first Slam of the season, the 2023 Tour Challenge. There, the team went 2–2, being eliminated from playoff contention due to a poor tournament draw to the button shootout score. The team made it to the final in the next Slam, the 2023 National. There, they went undefeated until they faced the equally undefeated Gim Eun-ji Korean rink in that game, which they lost 7–6. A week later, the team played in the Red Deer Curling Classic again, winning their second straight title after easily defeating the Selena Sturmay rink in the final, 8–1. The team continued their success in December, winning the 2023 Masters. They defeated Silvana Tirinzoni of Switzerland in the final, 8–4. A month later, the team won their second slam title in a row when the rink downed Tirinzoni again in the final of the 2024 Canadian Open. The team won 5–4, stealing the game in an extra end, after trailing 4–2 after the seventh end.

New qualifying rules for the Scotties Tournament of Hearts allowed Team Homan a pre-qualifying spot at the 2024 Scotties Tournament of Hearts without having to play in the 2024 playdowns. At the Hearts, the team went undefeated, winning all eleven of their games, including the final, where they beat Jennifer Jones, another pre-qualifier team, 5–4. It was Jones' last Hearts, as she decided to retire prior to the event. The win was Wilkes' second career Hearts title.

With the Scotties win, the team went on to represent Canada at the 2024 World Women's Curling Championship. At the Worlds, the team had an unmatched 11–1 round robin record which included ending Switzerland and Silvana Tirinzoni's 42 game winning streak at the Women's Worlds, which dated back to the 2021 Worlds. Their only defeat came against South Korea (skipped by Gim Eun-ji) in the last draw, a meaningless game for the team, as they had clinched first place and a bye to the semifinals. Team Canada faced-off against the Koreans again in the semifinals, and this time beat them, 9–7. This put them into the final, where they faced off against the four-time defending World Champion Tirinzoni team. Heading into the ninth end of the game, the team was down 5–4 to the Swiss, but Homan made a split of a rock in the 12-foot on her last to score three, giving her team a 7–5 lead. Switzerland conceded the game in the 10th after deciding they didn't have a shot to tie the game, giving Wilkes her first World Championship title.

Team Homan ended the 2023–24 season at the 2024 Players' Championship. The rink went undefeated in the tournament until the semifinal, where they lost to the same Tirinzoni rink they had beaten in the World Championship final. Team Homan would finish the season with an "unprecedented" 67–7 win-loss record.

In August 2025, it was announced that the team had found a new coach in two-time World bronze medallist Heather Nedohin, who had spared for the rink in 2023 while Homan was pregnant. In the team's first event of the 2025–26 curling season, they lost to Denmark's Madeleine Dupont in the semifinal of the 2025 AMJ Campbell Shorty Jenkins Classic. Two weeks later, the team played in their first Slam of the season, the AMJ Masters. The team won all seven of their games at the event, defeating rivals Silvana Tirinzoni in the final, 6–4. It was Wilkes' 8th career Slam. Team Homan would then go on to win their second slam of the season at the 2025 Tour Challenge, again defeating Tirinzoni in the final. Team Homan would continue their dominance at the 2025 GSOC Tahoe, defeating Tirinzoni in the third straight slam final of the season.

The Homan rink would complete their bid to represent Canada at the 2026 Winter Olympics by winning the 2025 Canadian Olympic Curling Trials, winning both games against Christina Black in the best-of-three final, marking Wilkes' first Olympic appearance.

=== Mixed ===
Wilkes played third for the Mick Lizmore-skipped Alberta team at the 2016 Canadian Mixed Curling Championship. The team would win the event. They represented Canada at the 2016 World Mixed Curling Championship, where they lost in the quarterfinal.

== Personal life ==
Wilkes' hometown is Scarborough, Ontario, where she attended Birchmount Park Collegiate Institute. She also played softball while attending Laurier University. She is married to Mick Lizmore and works as a psychotherapist. She has one child.

== Teams ==
Season	Skip	Third	Second	Lead
2008–09	Sarah Wilkes	Kaitlin Stubbs	Megan Van Huyse	Stephanie Piper
2009–10	Clancy Grandy	Sarah Wilkes	Jaclyn Rivington	Deborah Bentley
2010–11	Clancy Grandy	Sarah Wilkes	Laura Crocker	Lynn Kreviazuk
2011–12	Laura Crocker	Sarah Wilkes	Jen Gates	Clancy Grandy
2012–13	Laura Crocker	Sarah Wilkes	Rebecca Stretch	Jen Gates
2013–14	Kristie Moore	Sarah Wilkes	Ashleigh Clark	Kyla MacLachlan
2014–15	Kristie Moore	Sarah Wilkes	Kristina Hadden	Alison Thiessen
2015–16	Shannon Kleibrink	Lisa Eyamie	Sarah Wilkes	Alison Thiessen
2016–17	Shannon Kleibrink	Lisa Eyamie	Sarah Wilkes	Alison Thiessen
2017–18	Shannon Kleibrink	Sarah Wilkes	Kalynn Park	Alison Thiessen
2018–19	Chelsea Carey	Sarah Wilkes	Dana Ferguson	Rachelle Brown
2019–20	Chelsea Carey	Sarah Wilkes	Dana Ferguson	Rachelle Brown
2020–21	Rachel Homan	Emma Miskew	Sarah Wilkes	Joanne Courtney
2021–22	Rachel Homan	Emma Miskew	Sarah Wilkes	Joanne Courtney
2022–23	Rachel Homan (Fourth)	Tracy Fleury (Skip)	Emma Miskew	Sarah Wilkes
2023–24	Rachel Homan	Tracy Fleury	Emma Miskew	Sarah Wilkes
2024–25	Rachel Homan	Tracy Fleury	Emma Miskew	Sarah Wilkes
2025–26	Rachel Homan	Tracy Fleury	Emma Miskew	Sarah Wilkes
