= 2015 Boston Pizza Cup =

- Host city: Wainwright, Alberta
- Arena: Peace Memorial Multiplex
- Dates: February 4–8
- Winner: Kevin Koe
- Curling club: Glencoe CC, Calgary
- Skip: Kevin Koe
- Third: Marc Kennedy
- Second: Brent Laing
- Lead: Ben Hebert
- Finalist: Brendan Bottcher

The 2015 Boston Pizza Cup was held from February 4 to 8 at the Peace Memorial Multiplex in Wainwright, Alberta. The winning Kevin Koe team represented Alberta at the 2015 Tim Hortons Brier in Calgary.

== Qualification process ==
Twelve teams qualified for the provincial tournament through several methods. The qualification process is as follows:

Qualification method	Berths	Qualifying team
Defending champion	N/A^{1}	~~John Morris~~^{1}
Highest-ranked team on CTRS (April)^{1}	1	Brendan Bottcher
Highest-ranked team on CTRS (December) not already qualified	1	Kevin Koe^{1}
Alberta Curling Federation bonspiel points	2	Mick Lizmore; Aaron Sluchinski
Peace Curling Association qualifier (Jan. 17–19)	2	Tom Sallows; Daylan Vavrek
Northern Alberta Curling Association qualifier (Jan. 15–18)	3	James Pahl; Jamie King; Jessi Wilkinson
Southern Alberta Curling Association qualifier (Jan. 16–19)	3	Brock Virtue; Brent Bawel; Matthew Blandford

Notes

1. The defending champion usually receives the first berth, and in the case that the defending champion declines or is not eligible to receive the berth, the runner-up receives the berth. The defending champion from 2014, Kevin Koe, won the 2014 Tim Hortons Brier and, under the revised format implemented for the 2015 Brier, would have been eligible for automatic entry with his 2014 team in the 2015 Brier as Team Canada, which would have negated any need for him to compete in the Boston Pizza Cup. However, Koe assembled a new team in the off-season, rendering him ineligible for both the national and provincial berths. Had they not been eligible to compete as Team Canada, Koe's former teammates and their new skip John Morris would have received automatic entry into the 2015 Boston Pizza Cup. Meanwhile, the 2014 Albertan runner-up, Kevin Martin, retired in the off-season. Therefore, the first berth went to the highest ranked eligible team as of April.

== Teams ==
Skip	Third	Second	Lead	Alternate	Locale(s)
Brent Bawel	Michael Jantzen	Sean Morris	Byron Wickerson		Airdrie Curling Club, Airdrie
Matthew Blandford	Darren Moulding	Brent Hamilton	Brad Chyz		Coaldale Granite Club, Coaldale; Airdrie Curling Club, Airdrie
Brendan Bottcher	Tom Appelman	Bradley Thiessen	Karrick Martin		Saville Sports Centre, Edmonton
Jamie King	Jeff Erickson	Warren Hassall	Glen Kennedy		St. Albert Curling Club, St. Albert
Kevin Koe	Marc Kennedy	Brent Laing	Ben Hebert		Glencoe Curling Club, Calgary
Mick Lizmore	Nathan Connelly	Parker Konschuh	Carter Lautner		Saville Sports Centre, Edmonton
James Pahl	Ted Appelman	Mark Klinck	Roland Robinson		Strathcona Curling Club, Sherwood Park
Tom Sallows	Jordan Steinke	Ryan Deis	Kendall Warawa		Grande Prairie Curling Club, Grande Prairie
Aaron Sluchinski	Justin Sluchinski	Dylan Webster	Eric Richard	Kyle Richard	Airdrie Curling Club, Airdrie
Daylan Vavrek	Evan Asmussen	Jason Ginter	Andrew O'Dell		Sexsmith Curling Club, Sexsmith
Brock Virtue	Charley Thomas	Brandon Klassen	D. J. Kidby		Glencoe Curling Club, Calgary
Jessi Wilkinson	Michael Lambert	Neal Woloschuk	Morgan Van Doesburg	Julian Sawiak	Ellerslie Curling Club, Edmonton

== Knockout Draw Brackets ==
=== A event ===
First Knockout
Jamie King	9
Brent Bawel	1
Aaron Sluchinski	10
Jessi Wilkinson	9
Matthew Blandford	8
Tom Sallows	3
Mick Lizmore	4
Daylan Vavrek	6

Quarterfinals
Kevin Koe	9
Jamie King	4
Aaron Sluchinski	8
James Pahl	10
Brock Virtue	8
Matthew Blandford	2
Daylan Vavrek	5
Brendan Bottcher	6

Semifinals
Kevin Koe	7
James Pahl	5
Brock Virtue	8
Brendan Bottcher	7

A Qualifier
Kevin Koe	7
Brock Virtue	2

=== B event ===
Second Knockout
Aaron Sluchinski	5
Brent Bawel	6
Matthew Blandford	9
Jessi Wilkinson	6
Daylan Vavrek	2
Tom Sallows	8
Jamie King	9
Mick Lizmore	5

Quarterfinals
Brendan Bottcher	11
Brent Bawel	1
Matthew Blandford	9
James Pahl	3
Tom Sallows	5
Jamie King	6

Semifinals
Brendan Bottcher	8
Matthew Blandford	3
Jamie King	8
Brock Virtue	3

B Qualifier
Brendan Bottcher	7
Jamie King	3

=== C event ===
Third Knockout		Semifinals		C Qualifier 1
		Brock Virtue	1
Aaron Sluchinski	8	Aaron Sluchinski	9
Jessi Wilkinson	4			Aaron Sluchinski	7
				Matthew Blandford	6
		Tom Sallows	5
		Matthew Blandford	8

Third Knockout		Semifinals		C Qualifier 2
Brent Bawel	4
Daylan Vavrek	5	Daylan Vavrek	1
James Pahl	4	Mick Lizmore	7
Mick Lizmore	7			Mick Lizmore	7
				Jamie King	5

== Knockout results ==
=== Draw 1 ===
Wednesday, February 4, 9:30 am

Sheet A	1	2	3	4	5	6	7	8	9	10	Final
Matthew Blandford	0	0	2	0	1	0	5	X	X	X	8
Tom Sallows 🔨	0	1	0	1	0	1	0	X	X	X	3

Sheet B	1	2	3	4	5	6	7	8	9	10	11	Final
Aaron Sluchinski	0	1	0	2	0	0	2	2	0	2	1	10
Jessi Wilkinson 🔨	1	0	2	0	1	3	0	0	2	0	0	9

Sheet C	1	2	3	4	5	6	7	8	9	10	Final
Jamie King 🔨	2	1	0	2	2	2	X	X	X	X	9
Brent Bawel	0	0	1	0	0	0	X	X	X	X	1

Sheet D	1	2	3	4	5	6	7	8	9	10	Final
Mick Lizmore	0	0	2	0	0	1	0	1	0	0	4
Daylan Vavrek 🔨	1	0	0	1	1	0	1	0	1	1	6

=== Draw 2 ===
Wednesday, February 4, 6:30 pm

Team	1	2	3	4	5	6	7	8	9	10	Final
Kevin Koe 🔨	0	2	0	3	0	2	0	2	X	X	9
Jamie King	0	0	1	0	2	0	1	0	X	X	4

Team	1	2	3	4	5	6	7	8	9	10	Final
Aaron Sluchinski 🔨	1	0	2	0	2	0	2	0	1	0	8
James Pahl	0	2	0	1	0	1	0	2	0	4	10

Team	1	2	3	4	5	6	7	8	9	10	Final
Brock Virtue 🔨	2	1	0	5	0	X	X	X	X	X	8
Matthew Blandford	0	0	1	0	1	X	X	X	X	X	2

Team	1	2	3	4	5	6	7	8	9	10	11	Final
Daylan Vavrek	0	0	0	0	2	0	2	0	0	1	0	5
Brendan Bottcher 🔨	0	1	2	0	0	1	0	1	0	0	1	6

=== Draw 3 ===
Thursday, February 5, 9:00 am

Team	1	2	3	4	5	6	7	8	9	10	Final
Kevin Koe 🔨	1	1	0	1	0	4	0	0	0	X	7
James Pahl	0	0	2	0	2	0	0	0	1	X	5

Team	1	2	3	4	5	6	7	8	9	10	Final
Brock Virtue 🔨	2	0	0	1	1	0	0	2	0	2	8
Brendan Bottcher	0	3	1	0	0	0	2	0	1	0	7

=== Draw 4 ===
Thursday, February 5, 2:00 pm

Sheet A	1	2	3	4	5	6	7	8	9	10	Final
Jamie King 🔨	1	0	1	0	2	1	0	1	1	2	9
Mick Lizmore	0	1	0	3	0	0	1	0	0	0	5

Sheet B	1	2	3	4	5	6	7	8	9	10	Final
Daylan Vavrek	0	0	0	1	0	1	X	X	X	X	2
Tom Sallows 🔨	3	3	0	0	2	0	X	X	X	X	8

Sheet C	1	2	3	4	5	6	7	8	9	10	Final
Matthew Blandford 🔨	1	0	0	0	1	0	5	0	0	2	9
Jessi Wilkinson	0	1	0	2	0	2	0	0	1	0	6

Sheet D	1	2	3	4	5	6	7	8	9	10	11	Final
Aaron Sluchinski 🔨	0	1	0	2	0	1	0	0	0	1	0	5
Brent Bawel	0	0	1	0	1	0	2	1	0	0	1	6

=== Draw 5 ===
Thursday, February 5, 6:30 pm

Team	1	2	3	4	5	6	7	8	9	10	Final
Kevin Koe 🔨	2	0	1	0	0	2	2	X	X	X	7
Brock Virtue	0	1	0	1	0	0	0	X	X	X	2

Team	1	2	3	4	5	6	7	8	9	10	Final
Brendan Bottcher 🔨	4	1	2	1	0	3	X	X	X	X	11
Brent Bawel	0	0	0	0	1	0	X	X	X	X	1

Team	1	2	3	4	5	6	7	8	9	10	Final
Matthew Blandford 🔨	0	1	1	0	2	5	X	X	X	X	9
James Pahl	0	0	0	3	0	0	X	X	X	X	3

Team	1	2	3	4	5	6	7	8	9	10	Final
Tom Sallows	0	0	0	1	0	1	0	2	0	1	5
Jamie King 🔨	0	1	0	0	3	0	1	0	1	0	6

=== Draw 6 ===
Friday, February 6, 9:00 am

Sheet A	1	2	3	4	5	6	7	8	9	10	Final
Aaron Sluchinski 🔨	1	0	1	1	0	2	0	2	1	X	8
Jessi Wilkinson	0	0	0	0	3	0	1	0	0	X	4

Sheet C	1	2	3	4	5	6	7	8	9	10	Final
James Pahl	0	0	1	1	0	1	0	0	1	0	4
Mick Lizmore	0	1	0	0	1	0	2	2	0	1	7

Sheet D	1	2	3	4	5	6	7	8	9	10	Final
Brent Bawel	0	1	0	0	1	1	0	1	0	0	4
Daylan Vavrek 🔨	1	0	1	0	0	0	1	0	1	1	5

=== Draw 7 ===
Friday, February 6, 2:00 pm

Sheet B	1	2	3	4	5	6	7	8	9	10	Final
Jamie King 🔨	2	0	1	0	0	2	2	1	X	X	8
Brock Virtue	0	1	0	2	0	0	0	0	X	X	3

Sheet D	1	2	3	4	5	6	7	8	9	10	Final
Brendan Bottcher 🔨	0	3	0	2	3	0	X	X	X	X	8
Matthew Blandford	1	0	1	0	0	1	X	X	X	X	3

=== Draw 8 ===
Friday, February 6, 6:30 pm

Team	1	2	3	4	5	6	7	8	9	10	Final
Brendan Bottcher 🔨	0	1	1	0	2	0	2	0	1	X	7
Jamie King	0	0	0	1	0	1	0	1	0	X	3

Team	1	2	3	4	5	6	7	8	9	10	Final
Brock Virtue	0	0	1	0	0	0	0	X	X	X	1
Aaron Sluchinski 🔨	1	1	0	1	0	1	5	X	X	X	9

Team	1	2	3	4	5	6	7	8	9	10	Final
Tom Sallows 🔨	1	0	1	0	1	0	2	0	0	0	5
Matthew Blandford	0	2	0	1	0	3	0	1	0	1	8

Team	1	2	3	4	5	6	7	8	9	10	Final
Daylan Vavrek	0	0	0	0	1	0	X	X	X	X	1
Mick Lizmore 🔨	0	1	4	2	0	0	X	X	X	X	7

=== Draw 9 ===
Saturday, February 7, 1:00 pm

Team	1	2	3	4	5	6	7	8	9	10	Final
Aaron Sluchinski	0	0	2	0	2	0	0	2	0	1	7
Matthew Blandford 🔨	1	1	0	1	0	1	0	0	2	0	6

Team	1	2	3	4	5	6	7	8	9	10	Final
Mick Lizmore 🔨	1	1	0	1	0	3	0	0	0	1	7
Jamie King	0	0	2	0	1	0	0	2	0	0	5

== Playoffs ==
Page playoff system
A	Kevin Koe	6
B	Brendan Bottcher	4
C1	Aaron Sluchinski	5
C2	Mick Lizmore	7

Semifinal
B	Brendan Bottcher	7
C2	Mick Lizmore	4

Final
A	Kevin Koe	7
B	Brendan Bottcher	4

=== A vs. B ===
Saturday, February 7, 6:30 pm

Sheet D	1	2	3	4	5	6	7	8	9	10	Final
Kevin Koe 🔨	2	0	0	2	0	1	0	0	0	1	6
Brendan Bottcher	0	0	1	0	2	0	0	1	0	0	4

=== C1 vs. C2 ===
Saturday, February 7, 6:30 pm

Sheet A	1	2	3	4	5	6	7	8	9	10	Final
Aaron Sluchinski 🔨	2	0	0	1	0	2	0	0	0	X	5
Mick Lizmore	0	3	1	0	1	0	0	1	1	X	7

=== Semifinal ===
Sunday, February 8, 9:00 am

Sheet A	1	2	3	4	5	6	7	8	9	10	Final
Brendan Bottcher 🔨	0	1	0	2	0	2	0	2	0	X	7
Mick Lizmore	0	0	1	0	1	0	1	0	1	X	4

=== Final ===
Sunday, February 8, 2:00 pm

Sheet C	1	2	3	4	5	6	7	8	9	10	Final
Kevin Koe 🔨	2	1	0	0	1	0	3	0	0	X	7
Brendan Bottcher	0	0	1	0	0	2	0	0	1	X	4

2015 Boston Pizza Cup

Kevin Koe
4th Alberta Provincial Championship title
