= 2011 CIS/CCA Curling Championships =

- Host city: St. John's, Newfoundland and Labrador
- Dates: March 9–13
- Men's winner: (Newfoundland and Labrador) Memorial Sea-Hawks
- Skip: Colin Thomas
- Third: Cory Schuh
- Second: Chris Ford
- Lead: Spencer Wicks
- Finalist: Manitoba Bisons
- Women's winner: (Ontario) Laurier Golden Hawks
- Skip: Laura Crocker
- Third: Sarah Wilkes
- Second: Jen Gates
- Lead: Pam Feldkamp
- Finalist: (Ontario) Brock Badgers

The 2011 CIS/CCA Curling Championships were hosted by the Memorial University of Newfoundland and held in St. John's, Newfoundland and Labrador, Canada.

8 Teams in each gender competed at the Championship, including two from Western Canada, two from Ontario, two from Quebec, and two from Atlantic Canada, including the hosts Memorial University.

The Memorial Sea-Hawks became the men's champions, while the Laurier Golden Hawks became the women's champions.

== Men ==
=== Teams ===
Team	Skip	Third	Second	Lead	Alternate	University
Alberta Golden Bears	Brendan Bottcher	Brad Thiessen	Karrick Martin	Bryce Bucholz		University of Alberta
Guelph Gryphons	Craig Van Ymeren	Kevin Lagerquist	Michael McGaugh	Adam Leger	Bryan Mitchell	(Ontario) University of Guelph
Laurier Golden Hawks	Matt Mapletoft	Scott McGregor	Shane Konings	Joel Waters	Ian Romansky	(Ontario) Wilfrid Laurier University
Manitoba Bison	James Coleman	Braden Zawada	Ian Fordyce	Nigel Milnes		University of Manitoba
Memorial Sea-Hawks	Colin Thomas	Cory Schuh	Chris Ford	Spencer Wicks	Stephen Ryan	(Newfoundland and Labrador) Memorial University of Newfoundland
Saint Mary's Huskies	Kendal Thompson	Cameron MacKenzie	Stuart Thompson	Colten Steele		(Nova Scotia) Saint Mary's University
Saskatchewan Huskies	Mike Armstrong	Jayden Shwaga	Josh Durand	Brent Flaman		University of Saskatchewan
Trent Excalibur	Mike Bryson	Tyler Jones	Simon Barrick	Behn Lane	Chris Whitehill	(Ontario) Trent University

=== Round-robin standings ===
Team	Skip	W	L
Manitoba Bison	James Coleman	5	2
Alberta Golden Bears	Brendan Bottcher	5	2
(Newfoundland and Labrador) Memorial Sea-Hawks	Colin Thomas	4	3
(Ontario) Trent Excalibur	Mike Bryson	3	4
(Ontario) Laurier Golden Hawks	Matt Mapletoft	3	4
(Ontario) Guelph Gryphons	Craig Van Ymeren	3	4
(Nova Scotia) St. Mary's Huskies	Kendal Thompson	3	4
Saskatchewan Huskies	Mike Armstrong	2	5

=== Round-robin results ===
==== Draw 1 ====
Wednesday, March 10, 13:30

Sheet E	1	2	3	4	5	6	7	8	9	10	Final
Manitoba Bison (Coleman)	1	0	0	1	0	0	1	0	0	X	3
(Nova Scotia) St. Mary's Huskies (Thompson)	0	1	1	0	1	2	0	1	2	X	8

Sheet F	1	2	3	4	5	6	7	8	9	10	Final
Saskatchewan Huskies (Armstrong)	0	0	1	0	0	2	0	1	0	X	4
(Ontario) Guelph Gryphons (van Ymeren)	2	1	0	1	1	0	2	0	2	X	9

Sheet G	1	2	3	4	5	6	7	8	9	10	Final
(Ontario) Laurier Golden Hawks (Mapletoft)	0	0	0	1	0	1	0	1	X	X	3
(Newfoundland and Labrador) Memorial Sea-Hawks (Thomas)	0	0	3	0	2	0	3	0	X	X	8

Sheet H	1	2	3	4	5	6	7	8	9	10	Final
Alberta Golden Bears (Bottcher)	3	0	1	1	0	3	2	X	X	X	10
(Ontario) Trent Excalibur (Bryson)	0	1	0	0	2	0	0	X	X	X	3

==== Draw 2 ====
Wednesday, March 9, 18:30

Sheet E	1	2	3	4	5	6	7	8	9	10	11	Final
(Ontario) Trent Excalibur (Bryson)	2	0	0	0	1	0	0	2	0	0	1	6
(Ontario) Laurier Golden Hawks (Mapletoft)	0	0	1	1	0	1	1	0	0	1	0	5

Sheet F	1	2	3	4	5	6	7	8	9	10	Final
(Newfoundland and Labrador) Memorial Sea-Hawks (Thomas)	3	1	0	4	1	0	X	X	X	X	9
Alberta Golden Bears (Bottcher)	0	0	2	0	0	2	X	X	X	X	4

Sheet G	1	2	3	4	5	6	7	8	9	10	Final
Saskatchewan Huskies (Armstrong)	0	1	0	0	3	0	5	0	0	1	10
(Nova Scotia) St. Mary's Huskies (Thompson)	1	0	2	0	0	3	0	0	2	0	8

Sheet H	1	2	3	4	5	6	7	8	9	10	Final
(Ontario) Guelph Gryphons (van Ymeren)	0	3	2	0	1	2	X	X	X	X	8
Manitoba Bison (Coleman)	1	0	0	1	0	0	X	X	X	X	2

==== Draw 3 ====
Thursday, March 10, 9:00

Sheet A	1	2	3	4	5	6	7	8	9	10	Final
(Nova Scotia) St. Mary's Huskies (Thompson)	1	0	1	0	4	1	0	0	0	X	7
(Ontario) Trent Excalibur (Bryson)	0	0	0	2	0	0	1	1	1	X	5

Sheet B	1	2	3	4	5	6	7	8	9	10	Final
(Ontario) Laurier Golden Hawks (Mapletoft)	1	0	0	0	2	1	1	0	0	2	7
Saskatchewan Huskies (Armstrong)	0	2	0	2	0	0	0	1	0	0	5

Sheet C	1	2	3	4	5	6	7	8	9	10	Final
Alberta Golden Bears (Bottcher)	0	2	1	0	0	1	1	1	X	X	6
(Ontario) Guelph Gryphons (van Ymeren)	1	0	0	0	1	0	0	0	X	X	2

Sheet D	1	2	3	4	5	6	7	8	9	10	Final
Manitoba Bison (Coleman)	2	0	2	0	2	0	2	0	2	0	10
(Newfoundland and Labrador) Memorial Sea-Hawks (Thomas)	0	2	0	1	0	2	0	2	0	2	9

==== Draw 4 ====
Thursday, March 10, 14:00

Sheet A	1	2	3	4	5	6	7	8	9	10	Final
(Ontario) Guelph Gryphons (van Ymeren)	0	3	0	0	0	3	0	0	0	0	6
(Newfoundland and Labrador) Memorial Sea-Hawks (Thomas)	1	0	1	2	2	0	1	1	0	1	9

Sheet B	1	2	3	4	5	6	7	8	9	10	Final
Alberta Golden Bears (Bottcher)	0	0	2	0	1	0	0	1	0	X	4
Manitoba Bison (Coleman)	0	0	0	3	0	1	1	0	4	X	9

Sheet C	1	2	3	4	5	6	7	8	9	10	Final
(Ontario) Trent Excalibur (Bryson)	1	0	0	2	1	0	2	0	0	0	6
Saskatchewan Huskies (Armstrong)	0	0	2	0	0	2	0	0	3	3	10

Sheet D	1	2	3	4	5	6	7	8	9	10	Final
(Nova Scotia) St. Mary's Huskies (Thompson)	0	1	0	1	0	0	0	2	0	0	4
(Ontario) Laurier Golden Hawks (Mapletoft)	1	0	3	0	0	0	1	0	2	0	7

==== Draw 5 ====
Thursday, March 10, 19:30

Sheet A	1	2	3	4	5	6	7	8	9	10	Final
Alberta Golden Bears (Bottcher)	1	0	2	1	0	1	2	0	X	X	7
Saskatchewan Huskies (Armstrong)	0	3	0	0	0	0	0	1	X	X	4

Sheet B	1	2	3	4	5	6	7	8	9	10	Final
(Nova Scotia) St. Mary's Huskies (Thompson)	2	1	1	1	0	3	X	X	X	X	8
(Newfoundland and Labrador) Memorial Sea-Hawks (Thomas)	0	0	0	0	2	0	X	X	X	X	2

Sheet G	1	2	3	4	5	6	7	8	9	10	Final
Manitoba Bison (Coleman)	4	0	0	0	0	0	0	1	0	2	7
(Ontario) Laurier Golden Hawks (Mapletoft)	0	1	0	1	1	0	1	0	2	0	6

Sheet H	1	2	3	4	5	6	7	8	9	10	Final
(Ontario) Trent Excalibur (Bryson)	1	0	2	1	1	0	0	2	1	X	8
(Ontario) Guelph Gryphons (van Ymeren)	0	2	0	0	0	0	3	0	0	X	5

==== Draw 6 ====
Friday, March 11, 8:30

Sheet E	1	2	3	4	5	6	7	8	9	10	Final
Saskatchewan Huskies (Armstrong)	0	1	0	0	2	0	0	0	2	0	5
Manitoba Bison (Coleman)	0	0	1	1	0	0	2	1	0	2	7

Sheet F	1	2	3	4	5	6	7	8	9	10	Final
(Ontario) Guelph Gryphons (van Ymeren)	4	1	0	2	1	1	X	X	X	X	9
(Nova Scotia) St. Mary's Huskies (Thompson)	0	0	2	0	0	0	X	X	X	X	2

Sheet G	1	2	3	4	5	6	7	8	9	10	Final
(Newfoundland and Labrador) Memorial Sea-Hawks (Thomas)	0	0	0	1	0	1	0	0	0	X	2
(Ontario) Trent Excalibur (Bryson)	0	2	2	0	1	0	1	3	0	X	9

Sheet H	1	2	3	4	5	6	7	8	9	10	Final
(Ontario) Laurier Golden Hawks (Mapletoft)	0	0	2	0	0	0	1	2	0	0	5
Alberta Golden Bears (Bottcher)	2	0	0	0	2	0	0	0	0	2	6

==== Draw 7 ====
Friday, March 11, 14:30

Sheet A	1	2	3	4	5	6	7	8	9	10	Final
(Ontario) Trent Excalibur (Bryson)	0	0	0	3	0	1	1	0	0	X	5
Manitoba Bison (Coleman)	0	0	1	0	4	0	0	2	2	X	9

Sheet B	1	2	3	4	5	6	7	8	9	10	11	Final
(Ontario) Guelph Gryphons (van Ymeren)	0	1	0	0	3	0	1	0	2	1	0	8
(Ontario) Laurier Golden Hawks (Mapletoft)	2	0	2	0	0	2	0	2	0	0	1	9

Sheet C	1	2	3	4	5	6	7	8	9	10	Final
(Nova Scotia) St. Mary's Huskies (Thompson)	0	0	0	0	1	0	X	X	X	X	1
Alberta Golden Bears (Bottcher)	3	0	1	1	0	3	X	X	X	X	8

Sheet D	1	2	3	4	5	6	7	8	9	10	Final
(Newfoundland and Labrador) Memorial Sea-Hawks (Thomas)	0	0	2	0	3	0	4	X	X	X	9
Saskatchewan Huskies (Armstrong)	1	1	0	1	0	1	0	X	X	X	4

=== Playoffs ===
Semifinal			Final
			1	Manitoba Bison	6
2	Alberta Golden Bears	2	3	(Newfoundland and Labrador) Memorial Sea-Hawks	7
3	(Newfoundland and Labrador) Memorial Sea-Hawks	7

==== Semifinal ====
Sheet A	1	2	3	4	5	6	7	8	9	10	Final
Alberta Golden Bears (Bottcher)	1	0	0	0	0	0	0	1	0	X	2
(Newfoundland and Labrador) Memorial Sea-Hawks (Thomas)	0	1	0	1	1	0	1	0	3	X	7

==== Final ====
Sheet A	1	2	3	4	5	6	7	8	9	10	Final
Manitoba Bison (Coleman)	0	1	0	1	0	1	0	1	1	1	6
(Newfoundland and Labrador) Memorial Sea-Hawks (Thomas)	1	0	2	0	3	0	1	0	0	0	7

== Women ==
=== Teams ===
Team	Skip	Third	Second	Lead	University
Alberta Pandas	Kelly Erickson	Erica Ortt	Alison Kotylak	Robyn Fenske	University of Alberta
Brock Badgers	Courtney Hodgson	Jessica Corrado	Lauren Wasylkiw	Joanne Curtis	(Ontario) Brock University
Guelph Gryphons	Clancy Grandy	Jaclyn Rivington	Emilie Metcalfe	Katelyn Wasylkiw	(Ontario) University of Guelph
Laurier Golden Hawks	Laura Crocker	Sarah Wilkes	Jen Gates	Pam Feldkamp	(Ontario) Wilfrid Laurier University
Memorial Sea-Hawks	Erin Porter	Alysha Renouf	Julie Devereaux	Erica Trickett	(Newfoundland and Labrador) Memorial University of Newfoundland
Regina Cougars	Alexandra Williamson	Kelsey Michaluk	Stephanie Gress	Jade Ivan	(Saskatchewan) University of Regina
Saint Mary's Huskies	Sarah Rhyno	Anita Casey	Julia Williams	Allison Hudson	(Nova Scotia) Saint Mary's University
Saskatchewan Huskies	Ashley Gregoire	Rachel Fritzler	Tessa Ruetz	Chelsey Penner	University of Saskatchewan

=== Round-robin standings ===
Team	Skip	W	L
(Ontario) Laurier Golden Hawks	Laura Crocker	6	1
(Nova Scotia) St. Mary's Huskies	Sarah Rhyno	5	2
(Ontario) Brock Badgers	Courtney Hodgson	4	3
Alberta Pandas	Kelly Erickson	4	3
(Newfoundland and Labrador) Memorial Sea-Hawks	Erin Porter	4	3
(Ontario) Guelph Gryphons	Clancy Grandy	2	5
(Saskatchewan) Regina Cougars	Alexandra Williamson	2	5
Saskatchewan Huskies	Ashley Gregoire	1	6

=== Round-robin results ===
==== Draw 1 ====
Wednesday, March 10, 14:00

Sheet A	1	2	3	4	5	6	7	8	9	10	Final
(Newfoundland and Labrador) Memorial Sea-Hawks (Porter)	0	2	0	1	1	0	0	2	0	0	6
(Ontario) Brock Badgers (Hodgson)	1	0	1	0	0	3	1	0	2	1	9

Sheet B	1	2	3	4	5	6	7	8	9	10	Final
(Ontario) Guelph Gryphons (Grandy)	0	0	1	0	2	1	1	3	0	X	8
Saskatchewan Huskies (Gregoire)	1	1	0	1	0	0	0	0	1	X	4

Sheet C	1	2	3	4	5	6	7	8	9	10	11	Final
(Nova Scotia) St. Mary's Huskies (Rhyno)	0	3	0	1	0	0	1	0	4	0	2	11
(Ontario) Laurier Golden Hawks (Crocker)	2	0	3	0	1	0	0	1	0	2	0	9

Sheet D	1	2	3	4	5	6	7	8	9	10	Final
Alberta Pandas (Erickson)	1	0	2	0	0	2	0	2	0	1	8
(Saskatchewan) Regina Cougars (Williamson)	0	1	0	1	1	0	2	0	2	0	7

==== Draw 2 ====
Wednesday, March 9, 19:00

Sheet A	1	2	3	4	5	6	7	8	9	10	Final
(Saskatchewan) Regina Cougars (Williamson)	0	0	2	0	2	0	0	0	1	0	5
(Nova Scotia) St. Mary's Huskies (Rhyno)	0	0	0	1	0	1	1	3	0	1	7

Sheet B	1	2	3	4	5	6	7	8	9	10	Final
(Ontario) Laurier Golden Hawks (Crocker)	2	0	5	0	2	0	2	X	X	X	11
Alberta Pandas (Erickson)	0	1	0	1	0	1	0	X	X	X	3

Sheet C	1	2	3	4	5	6	7	8	9	10	Final
(Ontario) Guelph Gryphons (Grandy)	0	2	0	1	1	0	0	0	2	1	7
(Ontario) Brock Badgers (Hodgson)	1	0	1	0	0	1	2	1	0	0	6

Sheet D	1	2	3	4	5	6	7	8	9	10	Final
Saskatchewan Huskies (Gregoire)	0	0	0	0	3	0	1	0	2	2	8
(Newfoundland and Labrador) Memorial Sea-Hawks (Porter)	0	4	1	1	0	1	0	0	0	0	7

==== Draw 3 ====
Thursday, March 10, 8:30

Sheet E	1	2	3	4	5	6	7	8	9	10	11	Final
(Ontario) Brock Badgers (Hodgson)	0	1	0	1	0	1	0	0	0	2	1	6
(Saskatchewan) Regina Cougars (Williamson)	0	0	0	0	2	0	1	1	1	0	0	5

Sheet F	1	2	3	4	5	6	7	8	9	10	Final
(Nova Scotia) St. Mary's Huskies (Rhyno)	0	0	3	0	0	1	3	1	X	X	8
(Ontario) Guelph Gryphons (Grandy)	1	1	0	1	0	0	0	0	X	X	3

Sheet G	1	2	3	4	5	6	7	8	9	10	Final
Alberta Pandas (Erickson)	0	0	1	0	1	4	1	1	X	X	8
Saskatchewan Huskies (Gregoire)	0	0	0	0	0	0	0	0	X	X	0

Sheet H	1	2	3	4	5	6	7	8	9	10	Final
(Newfoundland and Labrador) Memorial Sea-Hawks (Porter)	0	0	1	0	1	0	1	0	X	X	3
(Ontario) Laurier Golden Hawks (Crocker)	2	0	0	1	0	4	0	1	X	X	8

==== Draw 4 ====
Thursday, March 10, 13:30

Sheet E	1	2	3	4	5	6	7	8	9	10	Final
Saskatchewan Huskies (Gregoire)	0	2	0	1	0	1	0	0	X	X	4
(Ontario) Laurier Golden Hawks (Crocker)	3	0	1	0	3	0	0	4	X	X	11

Sheet F	1	2	3	4	5	6	7	8	9	10	Final
Alberta Pandas (Erickson)	1	0	0	0	0	0	1	1	0	X	3
(Newfoundland and Labrador) Memorial Sea-Hawks (Porter)	0	0	3	1	2	1	0	0	1	X	8

Sheet G	1	2	3	4	5	6	7	8	9	10	Final
(Saskatchewan) Regina Cougars (Williamson)	0	1	1	0	2	0	0	1	0	0	5
(Ontario) Guelph Gryphons (Grandy)	0	0	0	1	0	0	1	0	1	1	4

Sheet H	1	2	3	4	5	6	7	8	9	10	Final
(Ontario) Brock Badgers (Hodgson)	1	0	0	1	3	0	1	0	2	0	8
(Nova Scotia) St. Mary's Huskies (Rhyno)	0	1	2	0	0	1	0	4	0	2	10

==== Draw 5 ====
Thursday, March 10, 19:00

Sheet C	1	2	3	4	5	6	7	8	9	10	Final
(Newfoundland and Labrador) Memorial Sea-Hawks (Porter)	0	1	1	0	4	1	0	0	1	1	9
(Nova Scotia) St. Mary's Huskies (Rhyno)	1	0	0	2	0	0	3	2	0	0	8

Sheet D	1	2	3	4	5	6	7	8	9	10	Final
(Saskatchewan) Regina Cougars (Williamson)	0	2	0	2	1	0	2	1	0	X	8
Saskatchewan Huskies (Gregoire)	0	0	1	0	0	1	0	0	1	X	3

Sheet E	1	2	3	4	5	6	7	8	9	10	Final
Alberta Pandas (Erickson)	2	0	0	1	2	0	0	1	2	0	8
(Ontario) Guelph Gryphons (Grandy)	0	1	1	0	0	3	0	0	0	0	5

Sheet F	1	2	3	4	5	6	7	8	9	10	Final
(Ontario) Brock Badgers (Hodgson)	0	0	0	1	0	1	0	0	X	X	2
(Ontario) Laurier Golden Hawks (Crocker)	2	0	1	0	3	0	2	1	X	X	9

==== Draw 6 ====
Friday, March 11, 9:00

Sheet A	1	2	3	4	5	6	7	8	9	10	11	Final
(Ontario) Guelph Gryphons (Grandy)	0	0	2	0	0	3	0	0	1	1	0	7
(Newfoundland and Labrador) Memorial Sea-Hawks (Porter)	2	2	0	0	1	0	1	1	0	0	1	8

Sheet B	1	2	3	4	5	6	7	8	9	10	Final
Saskatchewan Huskies (Gregoire)	0	0	0	0	1	0	2	1	2	0	6
(Ontario) Brock Badgers (Hodgson)	1	0	1	1	0	5	0	0	0	0	8

Sheet C	1	2	3	4	5	6	7	8	9	10	Final
(Ontario) Laurier Golden Hawks (Crocker)	3	1	0	2	1	0	2	X	X	X	9
(Saskatchewan) Regina Cougars (Williamson)	0	0	2	0	0	0	0	X	X	X	2

Sheet D	1	2	3	4	5	6	7	8	9	10	Final
(Nova Scotia) St. Mary's Huskies (Rhyno)	0	0	0	4	0	2	0	1	0	1	8
Alberta Pandas (Erickson)	0	3	1	0	2	0	3	0	0	0	9

==== Draw 7 ====
Friday, March 11, 13:30

Sheet A	1	2	3	4	5	6	7	8	9	10	Final
(Saskatchewan) Regina Cougars (Williamson)	0	0	0	0	0	0	2	0	X	X	2
(Newfoundland and Labrador) Memorial Sea-Hawks (Porter)	1	1	1	1	2	1	0	3	X	X	10

Sheet B	1	2	3	4	5	6	7	8	9	10	Final
Saskatchewan Huskies (Gregoire)	0	1	0	0	1	0	0	0	0	X	2
(Nova Scotia) St. Mary's Huskies (Rhyno)	3	0	1	0	0	2	0	1	2	X	9

Sheet C	1	2	3	4	5	6	7	8	9	10	Final
(Ontario) Brock Badgers (Hodgson)	2	3	0	1	0	0	0	1	0	1	8
Alberta Pandas (Erickson)	0	0	2	0	1	1	1	0	1	0	6

Sheet D	1	2	3	4	5	6	7	8	9	10	Final
(Ontario) Laurier Golden Hawks (Crocker)	0	1	0	2	1	0	1	1	0	0	6
(Ontario) Guelph Gryphons (Grandy)	0	0	1	0	0	2	0	0	1	1	5

=== Tiebreakers ===
Sheet A	1	2	3	4	5	6	7	8	9	10	Final
(Newfoundland and Labrador) Memorial Sea-Hawks (Porter)	1	0	1	0	1	0	2	0	1	3	9
Alberta Pandas (Erickson)	0	3	0	1	0	1	0	1	0	0	6

Sheet A	1	2	3	4	5	6	7	8	9	10	11	Final
(Ontario) Brock Badgers (Hodgson)	2	0	0	0	1	0	1	1	0	0	1	6
(Newfoundland and Labrador) Memorial Sea-Hawks (Porter)	0	1	1	1	0	1	0	0	0	1	0	5

=== Playoffs ===
Semifinal			Final
			1	(Ontario) Laurier Golden Hawks	7
2	(Nova Scotia) St. Mary's Huskies	7	3	(Ontario) Brock Badgers	4
3	(Ontario) Brock Badgers	11

==== Semifinal ====
Sheet A	1	2	3	4	5	6	7	8	9	10	Final
(Nova Scotia) St. Mary's Huskies (Rhyno)	3	0	2	0	0	1	0	1	0	0	7
(Ontario) Brock Badgers (Hodgson)	0	2	0	1	1	0	2	0	1	4	11

==== Final ====
Sheet A	1	2	3	4	5	6	7	8	9	10	Final
(Ontario) Laurier Golden Hawks (Crocker)	0	1	0	1	1	1	0	3	0	0	7
(Ontario) Brock Badgers (Hodgson)	0	0	1	0	0	0	2	0	1	0	4

== See also ==
- Curling
- Canadian Curling Association
- University and college curling
