= Brad Thiessen (curler) =

Canadian curler

- Curler
- Born: March 1, 1990 (age 36); Edmonton, Alberta, Canada

Team
- Curling club: Saville Community SC, Edmonton, AB

Curling career
- Member Association: Alberta
- Brier: 7 (2017, 2018, 2019, 2020, 2021, 2022, 2023)
- World Championship: 1 (2021)
- Top CTRS ranking: 1st (2018–19)
- Grand Slam victories: 4 (2019 Canadian Open, 2019 Players', 2019 Champions Cup, 2023 Players')
Medal record
Men's curling
Representing Canada
Winter Universiade
Bronze medal – third place	2013 Trentino
Tim Hortons Brier
Bronze medal – third place	2022 Lethbridge
Representing Alberta
Tim Hortons Brier
Gold medal – first place	2021 Calgary
Silver medal – second place	2018 Regina
Silver medal – second place	2020 Kingston
Representing (Alberta) Team Wild Card
Tim Hortons Brier
Silver medal – second place	2019 Brandon

Bradley Thiessen (born March 1, 1990, in Edmonton, Alberta) is a Canadian curler. He was a long-time member of the Brendan Bottcher rink, throwing second stones for the team until 2022. With Bottcher, he won the 2021 Tim Hortons Brier and represented Canada at the 2021 World Men's Curling Championship.

== Career ==
=== Juniors ===
Thiessen was a member of the Bottcher rink at the 2010 Canadian Junior Curling Championships, representing Alberta. There, the team finished with a 6–6 record. Thiessen aged off the team, and was not a member of the team when Bottcher won the 2012 Canadian Junior Curling Championships. However, remained with Botcher in university curling, playing on the University of Alberta team which won a bronze medal at the 2011 CIS/CCA Curling Championships, gold at the 2012 CIS/CCA Curling Championships and silvers at the 2013 CIS/CCA Curling Championships and 2014 CIS/CCA Curling Championships. The team represented Canada at the 2013 Winter Universiade, where they won a bronze medal.

=== Men's ===
Aged out of juniors, Thiessen continued to curl with his University of Alberta team consisting of Bottcher, Lizmore and Martin. They won their first World Curling Tour event at the 2012 Red Deer Curling Classic, defeating the Kevin Koe rink in the final. The team played in their first men's provincials at the 2013 Boston Pizza Cup, winning just one game before being eliminated. The following season, the team qualified for two Grand Slam of Curling events, the 2013 Canadian Open and the 2014 National. At both events, the team posted a 1–4 record, not reaching the playoffs. They did, however, win their second World Curling Tour event, the 2013 Spruce Grove Cashspiel. At the 2014 Boston Pizza Cup they again won just one game before being eliminated.

Following the 2013–14 season, Lizmore left the team to form his own rink, and was replaced by Albertan veteran curler Tom Appelman. The team found immediate success with their new addition, beginning the 2014–15 season by winning the 2014 HDF Insurance Shoot-Out. That season, the team also won the German Masters and lost the final of the Red Deer Curling Classic. They also played in three Grand Slams, the 2014 National, the 2014 Canadian Open and the 2015 Players' Championship, making it to the semifinals in all three events. At the 2015 Boston Pizza Cup, the team would make it all the way to the final, where they lost to the Kevin Koe rink. The following season, the team had less success on tour, not winning any tour events. They did, however, reach the finals at both the HDF Insurance Shoot-Out and the Direct Horizontal Drilling Fall Classic. In Grand Slam play, they competed in five events, only reaching the quarterfinals of the 2015 Tour Challenge and the 2015 Canadian Open. At the 2016 Boston Pizza Cup, they would lose in the semifinal to the Koe rink.

Following the 2015–16 season, Appelman left the team and was replaced by two-time Brier champion Pat Simmons for the 2016–17 season. The team had mixed results on tour, reaching the semifinals at three events but never advancing to the finals. In Grand Slam play, they competed in the 2016 WFG Masters, the 2016 Tour Challenge and the 2016 Boost National, never reaching the playoffs in any of the three events. Over the 2016 Christmas break Simmons left the rink, with Darren Moulding taking over at third. With Moulding on the team they made it to the quarterfinals at the 2017 Canadian Open, which was the first event for the new lineup. In February 2017 Thiessen, Bottcher, Moulding and Karrick Martin won the 2017 Boston Pizza Cup. After a 3–0 record through the preliminary round, they won both the 1 vs. 2 page playoff game and the championship final, defeating the Ted Appelman rink 6–5 in the final game. The win earned Team Bottcher the right to represent Alberta at the 2017 Tim Hortons Brier, Thiessen's first appearance at the Canadian national men's championship. There, the team finished with a 3–8 round robin record, however, was able to defeat the defending champions Team Koe in one of those victories. They went 1–4 in their final event of the season, the 2017 Players' Championship.

During the 2017–18 season, the Bottcher rink won two tour events, the Medicine Hat Charity Classic and the Red Deer Curling Classic. They also reached the semifinals of the 2017 GSOC Tour Challenge Tier 2, losing their semifinal game to William Lyburn. In November 2017, the team competed in the Canadian Olympic Curling Pre-Trials in attempts to qualify for the 2017 Canadian Olympic Curling Trials. After a slow start, they managed to qualify for the playoffs with a 3–3 record. They then beat Glenn Howard in one of the semifinal games before losing to the John Morris rink in the first qualification final. They were, however, able to again defeat Howard in the second final, earning the ninth and final spot at the Olympic Trials. At the Trials, held December 2 to 10 in Ottawa, Ontario, the team posted a 4–4 round robin record, finishing in fourth place and just out of the playoffs. In the new year, they reached the quarterfinals of the 2018 Canadian Open where they lost to the eventual champions Team Peter de Cruz. Team Bottcher posted a perfect 5–0 record en route to defend their title at the 2018 Boston Pizza Cup, earning the right to represent Alberta at the 2018 Tim Hortons Brier. There, the team finished with an 8–3 record, earning a spot in the 3 vs. 4 page playoff game. They beat Northern Ontario's Brad Jacobs in the 3 vs. 4 game and then defeated Ontario's John Epping in the semifinal to reach the Brier final. In the championship game, against Team Canada's Brad Gushue, the team settled for silver after a 6–4 defeat. They ended their season at the 2018 Players' Championship and the 2018 Humpty's Champions Cup Slams. After missing the playoffs at the Players', they made the quarterfinals at the Champions Cup.

Team Bottcher had a strong start to the 2018–19 season, winning their second event, the Canad Inns Men's Classic, by defeating Team Kevin Koe in the final. They later played in the 2018 Tour Challenge where they made it all the way to the final where they were defeated by the Brad Jacobs rink. They also made the final of the Red Deer Curling Classic and reached the tiebreaker stage of the 2018 Canada Cup where they were beaten by the Koe rink. In January 2019, Team Bottcher would win their first Grand Slam event at the 2019 Canadian Open, capping off an undefeated week by defeating Team John Epping 6–3 in the final. They then competed in and won the 2019 TSN All-Star Curling Skins Game, earning $54,500 for their win. Despite losing the semifinal of the 2019 Boston Pizza Cup, Team Bottcher still competed in the 2019 Tim Hortons Brier as the Wildcard entry after beating the Epping rink in the wildcard game. After an 8–3 record through the round robin and championship pools, they qualified for the playoffs for the second straight year. They then secured wins over Canada's Brad Gushue and Northern Ontario's Brad Jacobs in the 3 vs. 4 page playoff and semifinal games respectively, qualifying for their second straight Brier final where they faced the Koe rink in the final. After a close game all the way through, Team Koe would score two in the tenth end to win the game 4–3, handing Team Bottcher another silver medal. They ended their season at the 2019 Players' Championship and 2019 Champions Cup Grand Slam events. At the Players', they went 3–2 through the round robin before winning all three of their playoff games to win the title. They also found success at the Champions Cup, going an undefeated 7–0 to claim their third straight Slam title.

Team Bottcher began their 2019–20 season at the 2019 AMJ Campbell Shorty Jenkins Classic where they lost the tiebreaker to Yannick Schwaller. They then played in the first two Slams of the season, reaching the quarterfinals of the 2019 Masters and the semifinals of the 2019 Tour Challenge. Team Bottcher won their first event of the season at the Ashley HomeStore Curling Classic, defeating the Mike McEwen rink in the final. They then lost in the semifinal of the 2019 Canada Cup to eventual winners Team John Epping. At the next two Slams, the team made the quarterfinals of the 2019 National and missed the playoffs at the 2020 Canadian Open. After losing the semifinal to Kevin Koe at provincials the previous season, Team Bottcher would win the 2020 Boston Pizza Cup with a draw to the button to defeat Karsten Sturmay 7–6. At the 2020 Tim Hortons Brier, the team went undefeated through the round robin with a 7–0 record. They then went 3–1 in the championship pool, and then beat Saskatchewan's Matt Dunstone in the 1 vs. 2 page playoff game. For the third year in a row, they would finish runner-up at the Brier, losing to Newfoundland and Labrador's Brad Gushue 7–3 in the championship final. It would be the team's last event of the season as both the Players' Championship and the Champions Cup Grand Slam events were cancelled due to the COVID-19 pandemic.

Team Bottcher played in three tour events during the 2020–21 season, winning the ATB Okotoks Classic and reaching the semifinals at both the ATB Banff Classic and the Ashley HomeStore Curling Classic. Due to the COVID-19 pandemic in Alberta, the 2021 provincial championship was cancelled. As the reigning provincial champions, Team Bottcher was chosen to represent Alberta at the 2021 Tim Hortons Brier. At the Brier, they finished second in their pool during round-robin play, with a 6–2 record. In the championship pool they improved their record to 9–3, earning the third seed in the playoffs where they defeated Matt Dunstone's Team Saskatchewan in the semifinals to make it to their fourth Brier finals in a row. Team Bottcher defeated four-time Brier champion Kevin Koe in the finals, with a score of 4–2, to win their first Brier championship. With the Brier win, Team Bottcher earned the right to represent Canada at the 2021 World Men's Curling Championship. There, the team led Canada to a 9–4 round robin record, in fourth place. This put them into the playoffs in a game against Scotland, skipped by Bruce Mouat, which they lost, eliminating the team. The team wrapped up the season in the bubble by playing in the season's only two slams. They lost to Mouat again in the final of the 2022 Champions Cup and missed the playoffs in the 2022 Players' Championship.

The next season, the team's first major tournament was the 2021 Masters, where they the lost to Mouat in the semifinals. The following week, the team represented Canada at the 2021 Americas Challenge, easily beating Brazil and Mexico to qualify Canada for a spot at the 2022 World Men's Curling Championship. The following week, they played in the 2021 National being eliminated once again by Team Mouat, this time in the quarterfinals. The team wrapped up the month of November at the 2021 Canadian Olympic Curling Trials, held November 20 to 28 in Saskatoon, Saskatchewan. There, they posted a disappointing 3–5 record. Following the Trials, Darren Moulding was cut from the team. His cut caused controversy, as the team stated on social media that he was leaving the team for "personal reasons", in which Moulding replied was "complete BS". Moulding stated that a rift with his teammates began the previous season while in the Calgary curling bubble, when he "challenged Bottcher on issues that he felt were important (to the team)". This included a "better business structure", suggesting that he wanted an equal share of the team's winnings. Moulding was replaced by the team's alternate, Patrick Janssen. The team represented Team Canada at the 2022 Tim Hortons Brier as defending champions. They finished the round robin with a 7–1 record, and qualified for the 1 vs. 2 game. They lost this game against Alberta's Kevin Koe rink, and were eliminated after losing the semifinal against Wild Card #1, which was skipped by Brad Gushue. The team then wrapped up the season by making it to the semifinals of the 2022 Players' Championship (being eliminated again by Bruce Mouat), and then lost in the quarters of the 2022 Champions Cup to Brad Gushue.

In March 2022, it was announced that Team Bottcher would be breaking up. It was later announced that Thiessen and teammate Karrick Martin would be joining the Kevin Koe rink for the 2022–23 season. Thiessen and Martin would continue to play second and lead respectively, with Koe skipping and Tyler Tardi playing third.

The new-look Koe foursome began the 2022–23 curling season playing in the inaugural 2022 PointsBet Invitational, and were knocked out in the quarterfinals to Reid Carruthers and his new-look team. The next month, the team played in their first Slam of the season, the 2022 National. After going 3–1 in pool play, the team lost in the quarters to Matt Dunstone, another new team. A couple of weeks later, the team played in the 2022 Tour Challenge, going 2–2 in pool play. This put them in a tiebreaker against John Epping, which they won. They then beat Joël Retornaz in the quarters before losing to Dunstone again in the semifinal. In December, the team played in their third slam of the season, the 2022 Masters. They failed to make the playoffs after posting a 1–3 record in pool play. The following month, the team again failed to make the playoffs at the 2023 Canadian Open. The team won a provincial title in February at the 2023 Boston Pizza Cup. The team lost just two games en route to defeating the Brendan Bottcher rink in the Alberta final. They represented Alberta at the 2023 Tim Hortons Brier, where the team finished with a 7–1 record in pool play. They would be eliminated in their first playoff game, however, losing to Ontario (skipped by Mike McEwen). The team wrapped up their season at the 2023 Players' Championship. There, the team went 4–1 in pool play, and then won all three of their playoff games, including defeating Switzerland's Yannick Schwaller rink in the final. It would be the final event for Thiessen who announced he is stepping away from the game.

=== Mixed ===
Thiessen was a member of the Alberta team which won the 2016 Canadian Mixed Curling Championship. The team's skip was Mick Lizmore, who had been a member of the Bottcher rink until 2014. The team represented Canada at the 2016 World Mixed Curling Championship, losing in the quarterfinals.

== Personal life ==
Thiessen works as a web developer for LawDepot. He is married to fellow curler Alison Thiessen, who was a member of their Canadian Mixed championship team. They have two children. Thiessen is a graduate of the University of Alberta.

== Teams ==
Season	Skip	Third	Second	Lead
2009–10	Brendan Bottcher	Brad Thiessen	Landon Bucholz	Bryce Bucholz
2010–11	Brendan Bottcher	Brad Thiessen	Landon Bucholz	Bryce Bucholz
2011–12	Brendan Bottcher	Brad Thiessen	Mick Lizmore	Karrick Martin
2012–13	Brendan Bottcher	Mick Lizmore	Brad Thiessen	Karrick Martin
2013–14	Brendan Bottcher	Mick Lizmore	Brad Thiessen	Karrick Martin
2014–15	Brendan Bottcher	Tom Appelman	Brad Thiessen	Karrick Martin
2015–16	Brendan Bottcher	Tom Appelman	Brad Thiessen	Karrick Martin
2016–17	Brendan Bottcher	Pat Simmons; Darren Moulding	Brad Thiessen	Karrick Martin
2017–18	Brendan Bottcher	Darren Moulding	Brad Thiessen	Karrick Martin
2018–19	Brendan Bottcher	Darren Moulding	Brad Thiessen	Karrick Martin
2019–20	Brendan Bottcher	Darren Moulding	Brad Thiessen	Karrick Martin
2020–21	Brendan Bottcher	Darren Moulding	Brad Thiessen	Karrick Martin
2021–22	Brendan Bottcher	Darren Moulding; Pat Janssen	Brad Thiessen	Karrick Martin
2022–23	Kevin Koe	Tyler Tardi	Brad Thiessen	Karrick Martin
