= 2016 Canadian Mixed Curling Championship =

- Host city: Toronto, Ontario
- Arena: Weston Golf & Country Club
- Dates: November 8–15, 2015
- Winner: Alberta
- Curling club: Saville SC, Edmonton
- Skip: Mick Lizmore
- Third: Sarah Wilkes
- Second: Brad Thiessen
- Lead: Alison Kotylak
- Finalist: Saskatchewan (Bruce Korte)

The 2016 Canadian Mixed Curling Championship was held from November 7 to 14, 2015 at the Weston Golf & Country Club in Toronto, Ontario. The winning Alberta team represented Canada at the 2016 World Mixed Curling Championship.

Alberta won its 11th Canadian Mixed Championship.

== Teams ==
The teams are listed as follows:

Team	Skip	Third	Second	Lead	Locale
Alberta	Mick Lizmore	Sarah Wilkes	Brad Thiessen	Alison Kotylak	Saville SC, Edmonton
British Columbia	Dean Joanisse	Shannon Aleksic	Tyler Orme	Kelsey Steiger	Royal City CC, New Westminster
Manitoba	Bob Sigurdson	Erika Sigurdson	Al Purdy	Lindsay Baldock	Granite CC, Winnipeg
New Brunswick	Charlie Sullivan	Leah Thompson	Paul Nason	Joanne Freeze	Thistle St. Andrews CC, Saint John
Newfoundland and Labrador	Chris Ford	Marie Christianson	Cory Ewart	Lauren Wasylkiw	RE/MAX Centre, St. John's
Northern Ontario	Colin Koivula	Oye-Sem Won Briand	Chris Briand	Amanda Gates	Port Arthur CC, Thunder Bay
Northwest Territories	Steve Moss	Dawn Moses	Brett Zubot	Debbie Moss	Yellowknife CC, Yellowknife
Nova Scotia	Doug MacKenzie	Jocelyn Nix	Richard Barker	Shelley Barker	Lakeshore CC, Lower Sackville
Nunavut	Ed MacDonald	Denise Hutchings	Alex Larabie	Danielle North	Iqaluit CC, Iqaluit
Ontario	Mike McLean	Brit O'Neill	Andrew Denny-Petch	Karen Sagle	Ottawa CC, Ottawa
Prince Edward Island	Eddie MacKenzie	Chloe McCloskey	Tyler MacKenzie	Megan Wile	Charlottetown CC, Charlottetown
Quebec	Maxime Elmaleh	Roxane Perron	Jean Gagnon	Sonia Delisle	Club de curling Etchemin, Saint-Romuald
Saskatchewan	Bruce Korte	Ros Stewart	Kevin Marsh	Carolyn Marsh	Nutana CC, Saskatoon
Yukon	Robert Smallwood	Nicole Baldwin	Wade Scoffin	Jody Smallwood	Whitehorse CC, Whitehorse

== Round robin ==
=== Standings ===
Final Round Robin Standings

Key
Teams to Championship Pool

Pool A	Skip	W	L
Alberta	Mick Lizmore	6	0
Nova Scotia	Doug MacKenzie	4	2
Northern Ontario	Colin Koivula	4	2
Saskatchewan	Bruce Korte	3	3
Newfoundland and Labrador	Chris Ford	2	4
Prince Edward Island	Eddie MacKenzie	1	5
British Columbia	Dean Joanisse	1	5

Pool B	Skip	W	L
New Brunswick	Charlie Sullivan	5	1
Quebec	Maxime Elmaleh	4	2
Northwest Territories	Steve Moss	3	3
Yukon	Robert Smallwood	3	3
Manitoba	Bob Sigurdson	3	3
Ontario	Mike McLean	3	3
Nunavut	Ed MacDonald	0	6

=== Results ===
All draw times listed are in Eastern Standard Time (UTC−5).

==== Draw 1 ====
Sunday, November 8, 7:00 pm

Sheet 1	1	2	3	4	5	6	7	8	Final
Ontario (McLean) 🔨	3	2	2	2	0	3	X	X	12
Nunavut (MacDonald)	0	0	0	0	1	0	X	X	1

Sheet 2	1	2	3	4	5	6	7	8	Final
Saskatchewan (Korte) 🔨	2	1	0	2	0	0	1	X	6
Prince Edward Island (E. MacKenzie)	0	0	0	0	0	1	1	X	2

Sheet 3	1	2	3	4	5	6	7	8	Final
British Columbia (Joanisse) 🔨	0	3	0	1	0	2	1	X	7
Newfoundland and Labrador (Ford)	0	0	2	0	1	0	0	X	3

Sheet 4	1	2	3	4	5	6	7	8	9	Final
Quebec (Elmaleh)	1	0	0	2	0	2	0	0	0	5
Manitoba (Sigurdson) 🔨	0	2	1	0	1	0	0	1	1	6

Sheet 5	1	2	3	4	5	6	7	8	Final
Alberta (Lizmore)	0	1	0	3	0	0	1	0	5
Northern Ontario (Koivula) 🔨	0	0	1	0	0	1	0	1	3

==== Draw 2 ====
Monday, November 9, 2:30 pm

Sheet 1	1	2	3	4	5	6	7	8	Final
Prince Edward Island (E. MacKenzie) 🔨	1	0	1	0	0	0	0	X	2
Nova Scotia (D. MacKenzie)	0	0	0	4	2	1	2	X	9

Sheet 2	1	2	3	4	5	6	7	8	Final
Alberta (Lizmore) 🔨	0	0	3	0	1	0	2	X	6
British Columbia (Joanisse)	0	0	0	2	0	2	0	X	4

Sheet 3	1	2	3	4	5	6	7	8	Final
Northwest Territories (Moss)	0	0	1	1	1	1	1	X	5
Yukon (Smallwood) 🔨	2	1	0	0	0	0	0	X	3

Sheet 4	1	2	3	4	5	6	7	8	Final
Ontario (McLean) 🔨	0	0	0	3	0	0	2	2	7
New Brunswick (Sullivan)	0	1	1	0	2	1	0	0	5

==== Draw 3 ====
Monday, November 9, 7:00 pm

Sheet 1	1	2	3	4	5	6	7	8	Final
Newfoundland and Labrador (Ford)	1	0	0	1	0	1	0	2	5
Saskatchewan (Korte) 🔨	0	1	1	0	1	0	0	0	3

Sheet 2	1	2	3	4	5	6	7	8	Final
Quebec (Elmaleh) 🔨	2	1	0	2	0	1	1	X	7
Yukon (Smallwood)	0	0	1	0	1	0	0	X	2

Sheet 3	1	2	3	4	5	6	7	8	Final
Northern Ontario (Koivula)	0	0	2	0	2	0	0	0	4
Nova Scotia (D. MacKenzie) 🔨	1	1	0	1	0	0	2	1	6

Sheet 4	1	2	3	4	5	6	7	8	Final
Nunavut (MacDonald)	0	0	0	1	0	1	0	X	2
Northwest Territories (Moss) 🔨	1	1	1	0	4	0	4	X	11

Sheet 5	1	2	3	4	5	6	7	8	Final
New Brunswick (Sullivan) 🔨	1	0	1	0	0	0	4	X	6
Manitoba (Sigurdson)	0	1	0	1	1	0	0	X	3

==== Draw 4 ====
Tuesday, November 10, 10:00 am

Sheet 2	1	2	3	4	5	6	7	8	Final
Manitoba (Sigurdson) 🔨	3	0	3	0	0	4	X	X	10
Ontario (McLean)	0	3	0	2	1	0	X	X	6

Sheet 3	1	2	3	4	5	6	7	8	Final
Quebec (Elmaleh) 🔨	0	1	0	4	0	3	0	X	8
Nunavut (MacDonald)	1	0	1	0	1	0	1	X	4

Sheet 4	1	2	3	4	5	6	7	8	Final
Saskatchewan (Korte)	0	1	0	0	1	0	2	X	4
Alberta (Lizmore) 🔨	1	0	0	1	0	4	0	X	6

Sheet 5	1	2	3	4	5	6	7	8	Final
Prince Edward Island (E. MacKenzie)	0	4	0	0	0	1	1	0	6
British Columbia (Joanisse) 🔨	1	0	0	1	2	0	0	1	5

==== Draw 5 ====
Tuesday, November 10, 2:30 pm

Sheet 1	1	2	3	4	5	6	7	8	Final
New Brunswick (Sullivan)	0	1	0	0	0	0	0	3	4
Quebec (Elmaleh) 🔨	0	0	0	1	0	1	1	0	3

Sheet 2	1	2	3	4	5	6	7	8	9	Final
Northern Ontario (Koivula)	0	0	1	0	0	3	0	0	1	5
Newfoundland and Labrador (Ford) 🔨	0	2	0	0	1	0	0	1	0	4

Sheet 3	1	2	3	4	5	6	7	8	9	Final
Manitoba (Sigurdson)	0	1	0	1	0	2	0	0	0	4
Northwest Territories (Moss) 🔨	0	0	1	0	2	0	0	1	2	6

Sheet 4	1	2	3	4	5	6	7	8	Final
Yukon (Smallwood)	0	4	0	4	1	4	X	X	13
Nunavut (MacDonald) 🔨	1	0	1	0	0	0	X	X	2

Sheet 5	1	2	3	4	5	6	7	8	Final
Nova Scotia (D. MacKenzie)	0	1	0	0	0	1	X	X	2
Saskatchewan (Korte) 🔨	2	0	3	1	1	0	X	X	7

==== Draw 6 ====
Tuesday, November 10, 7:00 pm

Sheet 1	1	2	3	4	5	6	7	8	Final
Alberta (Lizmore)	3	0	1	0	1	1	X	X	6
Newfoundland and Labrador (Ford) 🔨	0	1	0	0	0	0	X	X	1

Sheet 2	1	2	3	4	5	6	7	8	Final
New Brunswick (Sullivan) 🔨	2	0	1	0	0	2	2	X	7
Northwest Territories (Moss)	0	2	0	0	1	0	0	X	3

Sheet 3	1	2	3	4	5	6	7	8	9	Final
Nova Scotia (D. MacKenzie) 🔨	0	2	0	1	0	2	0	0	1	6
British Columbia (Joanisse)	1	0	1	0	1	0	1	1	0	5

Sheet 4	1	2	3	4	5	6	7	8	Final
Northern Ontario (Koivula)	0	0	1	0	2	0	0	2	5
Prince Edward Island (E. MacKenzie) 🔨	0	2	0	1	0	1	0	0	4

Sheet 5	1	2	3	4	5	6	7	8	Final
Yukon (Smallwood)	1	2	0	0	2	0	1	1	7
Ontario (McLean) 🔨	0	0	2	2	0	2	0	0	6

==== Draw 7 ====
Wednesday, November 11, 10:00 am

Sheet 2	1	2	3	4	5	6	7	8	Final
Nunavut (MacDonald) 🔨	0	0	1	0	0	1	X	X	2
Manitoba (Sigurdson)	1	2	0	4	5	0	X	X	12

Sheet 3	1	2	3	4	5	6	7	8	Final
Saskatchewan (Korte) 🔨	0	0	0	2	0	0	0	X	2
Northern Ontario (Koivula)	0	0	0	0	2	3	1	X	6

Sheet 4	1	2	3	4	5	6	7	8	Final
Newfoundland and Labrador (Ford) 🔨	1	0	0	0	1	2	0	0	4
Nova Scotia (D. MacKenzie)	0	2	1	1	0	0	1	1	6

Sheet 5	1	2	3	4	5	6	7	8	Final
Northwest Territories (Moss)	0	4	0	1	0	0	1	0	6
Quebec (Elmaleh) 🔨	1	0	3	0	1	1	0	2	8

==== Draw 8 ====
Wednesday, November 11, 2:30 pm

Sheet 1	1	2	3	4	5	6	7	8	Final
British Columbia (Joanisse)	0	0	1	0	0	2	0	X	3
Northern Ontario (Koivula) 🔨	0	2	0	2	1	0	2	X	7

Sheet 2	1	2	3	4	5	6	7	8	Final
Nova Scotia (D. MacKenzie)	0	0	0	2	2	0	0	X	4
Alberta (Lizmore) 🔨	0	4	1	0	0	2	3	X	10

Sheet 3	1	2	3	4	5	6	7	8	Final
Yukon (Smallwood) 🔨	0	0	2	1	0	0	1	0	4
New Brunswick (Sullivan)	0	2	0	0	1	0	0	3	6

Sheet 4	1	2	3	4	5	6	7	8	Final
Northwest Territories (Moss) 🔨	0	0	0	1	0	0	X	X	1
Ontario (McLean)	2	2	1	0	2	4	X	X	11

Sheet 5	1	2	3	4	5	6	7	8	Final
Newfoundland and Labrador (Ford) 🔨	0	2	0	0	1	1	2	0	6
Prince Edward Island (E. MacKenzie)	1	0	1	1	0	0	0	2	5

==== Draw 9 ====
Wednesday, November 11, 7:00 pm

Sheet 1	1	2	3	4	5	6	7	8	Final
Manitoba (Sigurdson) 🔨	0	1	0	1	0	2	0	X	4
Yukon (Smallwood)	2	0	2	0	4	0	1	X	9

Sheet 2	1	2	3	4	5	6	7	8	Final
Ontario (McLean)	0	1	0	0	0	0	X	X	1
Quebec (Elmaleh) 🔨	2	0	1	3	1	1	X	X	8

Sheet 3	1	2	3	4	5	6	7	8	9	Final
Prince Edward Island (E. MacKenzie)	0	2	0	0	2	1	0	1	0	6
Alberta (Lizmore) 🔨	2	0	0	3	0	0	1	0	1	7

Sheet 4	1	2	3	4	5	6	7	8	9	Final
British Columbia (Joanisse)	0	0	1	0	1	0	1	1	0	4
Saskatchewan (Korte) 🔨	1	0	0	1	0	2	0	0	2	6

Sheet 5	1	2	3	4	5	6	7	8	Final
Nunavut (MacDonald)	0	0	0	1	0	1	0	X	2
New Brunswick (Sullivan) 🔨	0	1	1	0	5	0	2	X	9

== Placement Round ==
=== Standings ===
Final Round Robin Standings

Key
Teams to Playoffs

Championship Pool	Skip	W	L
Alberta	Mick Lizmore	10	0
Northern Ontario	Colin Koivula	8	2
Saskatchewan	Bruce Korte	6	4
New Brunswick	Charlie Sullivan	6	4
Nova Scotia	Doug MacKenzie	6	4
Quebec	Maxime Elmaleh	5	5
Northwest Territories	Steve Moss	4	6
Yukon	Robert Smallwood	3	7

Seeding Pool	Skip	W	L
Ontario	Mike McLean	6	3
Manitoba	Bob Sigurdson	5	4
British Columbia	Dean Joanisse	3	6
Newfoundland and Labrador	Chris Ford	3	6
Prince Edward Island	Eddie MacKenzie	2	7
Nunavut	Ed MacDonald	0	9

=== Results ===
==== Draw 1 ====
Thursday, November 12, 10:00 am

Sheet 1	1	2	3	4	5	6	7	8	Final
Newfoundland and Labrador (Ford)	0	2	0	2	0	3	1	X	8
Nunavut (MacDonald) 🔨	1	0	0	0	1	0	0	X	2

Sheet 2	1	2	3	4	5	6	7	8	Final
Prince Edward Island (MacKenzie) 🔨	1	1	0	0	1	0	0	X	3
Manitoba (Sigurdson)	0	0	1	1	0	3	2	X	7

Sheet 4	1	2	3	4	5	6	7	8	Final
British Columbia (Joanisse)	0	0	0	3	0	0	0	X	3
Ontario (MacLean) 🔨	3	0	1	0	1	1	1	X	7

==== Draw 2 ====
Thursday, November 12, 2:30 pm

Sheet 1	1	2	3	4	5	6	7	8	9	Final
Saskatchewan (Korte)	0	1	0	2	0	0	3	0	1	7
Quebec (Elmaleh) 🔨	1	0	1	0	2	1	0	1	0	6

Sheet 2	1	2	3	4	5	6	7	8	Final
British Columbia (Joanisse) 🔨	3	2	2	0	0	2	X	X	9
Nunavut (MacDonald)	0	0	0	1	1	0	X	X	2

Sheet 3	1	2	3	4	5	6	7	8	Final
Alberta (Lizmore) 🔨	2	0	0	3	0	0	3	X	8
Northwest Territories (Moss)	0	1	0	0	0	1	0	X	2

Sheet 4	1	2	3	4	5	6	7	8	Final
Nova Scotia (MacKenzie) 🔨	2	2	0	1	0	0	0	2	7
Yukon (Smallwood)	0	0	5	0	0	1	0	0	6

Sheet 5	1	2	3	4	5	6	7	8	Final
Northern Ontario (Koivula) 🔨	0	1	2	0	0	1	0	0	4
New Brunswick (Sullivan)	0	0	0	0	1	0	1	1	3

==== Draw 3 ====
Thursday, November 12, 7:00 pm

Sheet 1	1	2	3	4	5	6	7	8	Final
Nova Scotia (MacKenzie)	1	0	3	0	1	2	X	X	7
Northwest Territories (Moss) 🔨	0	1	0	1	0	0	X	X	2

Sheet 2	1	2	3	4	5	6	7	8	Final
Alberta (Lizmore)	2	3	0	0	2	0	X	X	7
Yukon (Smallwood) 🔨	0	0	1	1	0	1	X	X	3

Sheet 3	1	2	3	4	5	6	7	8	Final
Northern Ontario (Koivula) 🔨	2	0	4	1	0	1	X	X	8
Quebec (Elmaleh)	0	1	0	0	2	0	X	X	3

Sheet 4	1	2	3	4	5	6	7	8	Final
Saskatchewan (Korte) 🔨	1	0	2	0	1	0	1	X	5
New Brunswick (Sullivan)	0	1	0	1	0	2	0	X	4

Sheet 5	1	2	3	4	5	6	7	8	Final
Prince Edward Island (MacKenzie)	1	1	0	1	1	1	0	0	5
Ontario (McLean) 🔨	0	0	2	0	0	0	3	2	7

==== Draw 4 ====
Friday, November 13, 10:00 am

Sheet 2	1	2	3	4	5	6	7	8	9	Final
Nova Scotia (MacKenzie)	0	2	0	3	0	0	0	1	0	6
Quebec (Elmaleh) 🔨	1	0	2	0	2	1	0	0	1	7

Sheet 3	1	2	3	4	5	6	7	8	Final
British Columbia (Joanisse) 🔨	1	0	1	2	0	3	0	0	7
Manitoba (Sigurdson)	0	2	0	0	1	0	2	1	6

Sheet 4	1	2	3	4	5	6	7	8	Final
Northern Ontario (Koivula) 🔨	0	1	1	0	0	4	0	X	6
Northwest Territories (Moss)	0	0	0	0	2	0	1	X	3

==== Draw 5 ====
Friday, November 13, 2:30 pm

Sheet 1	1	2	3	4	5	6	7	8	Final
Alberta (Lizmore) 🔨	2	0	0	2	0	1	0	2	7
New Brunswick (Sullivan)	0	1	0	0	1	0	1	0	3

Sheet 2	1	2	3	4	5	6	7	8	Final
Newfoundland and Labrador (Ford)	0	0	0	0	3	0	1	0	4
Ontario (McLean) 🔨	2	0	1	1	0	1	0	3	8

Sheet 4	1	2	3	4	5	6	7	8	Final
Prince Edward Island (MacKenzie) 🔨	1	0	4	0	2	2	X	X	9
Nunavut (MacDonald)	0	1	0	1	0	0	X	X	2

Sheet 5	1	2	3	4	5	6	7	8	Final
Saskatchewan (Korte) 🔨	1	0	0	5	0	1	0	X	7
Yukon (Smallwood)	0	0	1	0	3	0	1	X	5

==== Draw 6 ====
Friday, November 13, 7:00 pm

Sheet 1	1	2	3	4	5	6	7	8	Final
Northern Ontario (Koivula)	0	0	1	1	2	1	1	X	6
Yukon (Smallwood) 🔨	1	1	0	0	0	0	0	X	2

Sheet 2	1	2	3	4	5	6	7	8	Final
Saskatchewan (Korte)	0	1	0	0	2	0	3	0	6
Northwest Territories (Moss) 🔨	2	0	0	2	0	2	0	2	8

Sheet 3	1	2	3	4	5	6	7	8	Final
Nova Scotia (MacKenzie)	0	0	3	0	0	1	0	0	4
New Brunswick (Sullivan) 🔨	2	1	0	1	0	0	1	2	7

Sheet 4	1	2	3	4	5	6	7	8	9	Final
Newfoundland and Labrador (Ford) 🔨	0	2	1	0	0	1	0	0	0	4
Manitoba (Sigurdson)	0	0	0	2	0	0	1	1	1	5

Sheet 5	1	2	3	4	5	6	7	8	Final
Alberta (Lizmore) 🔨	0	2	0	0	1	0	1	X	4
Quebec (Elmaleh)	0	0	0	0	0	1	0	X	1

== Playoffs ==
Semifinals
1	Alberta	6
4	New Brunswick	3
2	Northern Ontario	4
3	Saskatchewan	5

Final
1	Alberta	4
3	Saskatchewan	2

Bronze medal game
4	New Brunswick	3
2	Northern Ontario	8

=== Semifinals ===
Saturday, November 14, 10:00 am

Team	1	2	3	4	5	6	7	8	Final
Alberta (Lizmore) 🔨	0	1	0	2	0	2	1	X	6
New Brunswick (Sullivan)	0	0	1	0	2	0	0	X	3

Team	1	2	3	4	5	6	7	8	9	Final
Northern Ontario (Koivula) 🔨	0	1	0	1	0	1	0	1	0	4
Saskatchewan (Korte)	1	0	1	0	1	0	1	0	1	5

=== Bronze medal game ===
Saturday, November 14, 4:00 pm

Team	1	2	3	4	5	6	7	8	Final
New Brunswick (Sullivan)	0	0	0	1	0	2	0	X	3
Northern Ontario (Koivula) 🔨	0	3	1	0	3	0	1	X	8

=== Final ===
Saturday, November 14, 4:00 pm

Team	1	2	3	4	5	6	7	8	Final
Alberta (Lizmore) 🔨	0	2	0	0	0	2	0	0	4
Saskatchewan (Korte)	0	0	0	0	1	0	0	1	2
