= Thomas Sallows =

Canadian curler

- Curler
- Born: 3 March 1984 (age 42); Grande Prairie, Alberta

Team
- Curling club: Grande Prairie CC, Grande Prairie, AB
- Skip: Graham Powell
- Third: Thomas Sallows
- Second: Jordan Steinke
- Lead: Chris Wall

Curling career
- Brier: 3 (2015, 2016, 2018)
- World Championship: 3 (2015, 2017, 2018)
Medal record
Representing Canada
World Championships
Gold medal – first place	2017 Edmonton
Silver medal – second place	2018 Las Vegas
Bronze medal – third place	2015 Halifax
Tim Hortons Brier
Gold medal – first place	2015 Calgary
Gold medal – first place	2018 Regina
Canadian Olympic Curling Trials
Bronze medal – third place	2017 Ottawa
Representing Alberta North
Arctic Winter Games
Gold medal – first place	2002 Nuuk/Iqaluit

Thomas Sallows (born March 3, 1984) is a Canadian curler from Grande Prairie, Alberta. He regularly plays skip for a Grande Prairie, Alberta-based rink. He also competed at both the 2015 Tim Hortons Brier and 2015 Ford World Men's Curling Championship as an alternate for the Canadian national curling team.

Sallows also owns Mountain Man Adventures, a Canadian hunting and guiding business. He's been a featured expert on multiple hunting programs, including Wild TV. He is also a concrete finisher.

His sister is competitive curler Cary-Anne McTaggart.
