= Mick Lizmore =

Canadian curler

Medal record

Men's curling

Representing Canada

Winter Universiade
Bronze medal – third place	2013 Trentino	

Michael Lizmore (born November 7, 1987, in London, Ontario) is a Canadian curler. He is currently the Head Coach of Canada's National Wheelchair Curling Program, a position he has held since 2020.

== Career ==
=== Juniors ===
Lizmore, who is originally from London, Ontario won the 2007 Pepsi Ontario Junior Curling Championships playing vice for the Ryan Myler rink. Representing Ontario at the 2007 Canadian Junior Curling Championships, the team went 8–4, missing the playoffs.

=== Men's career: Ontario ===
After juniors, Lizmore joined the Mark Kean rink for one season before joining the Jake Higgs team in 2008 as lead. The team made it to the 2009 TSC Stores Tankard, the provincial men's championship for Ontario, where they finished in 4th place. The next season they did not make it to provincials but did play in one Grand Slam of Curling event, the 2010 Players' Championship, where they went winless.

=== Men's career: Alberta ===
Lizmore moved to Alberta to attend the University of Alberta (after attending the University of Western Ontario) to study psychology. He joined the Brendan Bottcher rink in 2011, playing third. The team won the 2012 CIS/CCA Curling Championships in their first season together. The next season, they represented Canada at the 2013 Winter Universiade, where they won a bronze medal. That season, the team won their first World Curling Tour event, the Red Deer Curling Classic, and played in Lizmore's first Alberta men's provincial championship, the 2013 Boston Pizza Cup, winning just one game. The 2013-14 season was the last season for Lizmore on the team. That year, they won one tour event, the Spruce Grove Cashspiel and won just one game at the 2014 Boston Pizza Cup. They also played on one Slam that year, the 2013 Canadian Open of Curling, where they won just one game.

In 2014, Lizmore formed his own rink with Nathan Connolly, Parker Konschuh and Carter Lautner. The team won the Shamrock Shotgun World Curling Tour event that year and qualified for the playoffs at the 2015 Boston Pizza Cup, where they lost in the semifinal against Lizmore's former skip, Brendan Bottcher. That season Lizmore played in the 2014 National Grand Slam event, playing second for Matthew Blandford, missing the playoffs.

For the 2015-16 season, Lizmore added Dalyn Vavrek and Brad Chyz to the team, replacing Connolly and Konschuh. The team won the Red Deer Curling Classic. Once again Lizmore made it to the playoffs at the 2016 Boston Pizza Cup, and once again lost to Bottcher, this time in the 3 vs. 4 game. Also that season, Lizmore won the 2016 Canadian Mixed Curling Championship with teammates Sarah Wilkes, Brad Thiessen, Alison Kotylak.

== Personal life ==
He is married to Sarah Wilkes, a member of team Rachel Homan.
