= Alison Thiessen =

Canadian curler

- Curler
- Born: Alison Kotylak; October 19, 1992 (age 34); Edmonton, Alberta

Team
- Curling club: Saville Community SC, Edmonton, AB

Curling career
- Hearts: 1 (2017)
- Top CTRS ranking: 15th (2016-17)
Medal record
Women's curling
Representing Canada
World Junior Curling Championships
Gold medal – first place	2014 Flims

Alison Teresa Thiessen (born October 19, 1992 in Edmonton, Alberta as Alison Kotylak) is a Canadian curler.

== Career ==
=== Juniors ===
Thiessen was invited to play as Team Canada's (skipped by Kelsey Rocque) alternate at the 2014 World Junior Curling Championships, however she did not play in any games.

Thiessen played for the University of Alberta curling team from 2011 to 2015. She was the second on the team from 2011 to 2012, the alternate from 2013 to 2014 and was lead in 2015. Her skip in 2011 and 2012 was Kelly Erickson and from 2013 to 2015 was Rocque. At the 2011 CIS/CCA Curling Championships and the 2012 CIS/CCA Curling Championships the team would lose in tiebreakers. At the 2013 and 2014 CIS/CCA Curling Championships, they would lose in the final. The team would finally win the CIS/CCA Curling Championships in 2015.

=== Mixed ===
Thiessen was a member of the 2016 Canadian Mixed Curling Championship winning team, throwing lead stones for the Mick Lizmore-skipped Alberta team. The team represented Canada at the 2016 World Mixed Curling Championship, where they lost in the quarterfinals.

=== Women's ===
Thiessen played in her first provincial championship in 2014 playing lead for Erickson. The team would be knocked out after losing all three of their games. The next season Thiessen joined the Kristie Moore rink as her lead. The team played in one Grand Slam of Curling event, the 2014 Curlers Corner Autumn Gold Curling Classic, where they would lose all three of their games.

Thiessen joined the Shannon Kleibrink team in 2015 as her lead. The team played in the 2016 Alberta Scotties Tournament of Hearts, where they just missed out on the playoffs. The team would however go on to win the 2017 Alberta Scotties Tournament of Hearts, and would represent Alberta at the 2017 Scotties Tournament of Hearts, Canada's national women's curling championship.

== Personal life ==
Thiessen is married to fellow curler Bradley Thiessen. The pair were married in 2016 and had a curling-themed wedding. They have two daughters. She has two older sisters who also curl. Thiessen works as a recreation therapy manager for the South Terrace Continuing Care Home. She received a Bachelor of Arts in Recreation from the University of Alberta in 2015.
