= 2010 CIS/CCA Curling Championships =

The 2010 CIS Curling Championships were staged at the Saville Sports Centre in Edmonton, Alberta, Canada. The men's title was won by the surprise of the tournament, the Queen's Gaels skipped by Jonathan Beuk. In the final, the Gaels defeated the UPEI Panthers, skipped by former Canadian junior champion and world junior silver medallist, Brett Gallant. In the women's final, the Regina Cougars took the title when skip Brooklyn Lemon drew the pin in an extra to defeat the St. Mary's Huskies. This was the second consecutive runner-up finish for SMU skip Marie Christianson. With their wins, Queen's and Regina will represent Canada at the 2011 FISU Winter Universiade in Erzurum, Turkey.

Men's results

Men's Pool A	W	L
Queen's Gaels	5	1
Western Mustangs	4	2
Alberta Golden Bears	4	2
UPEI Panthers	4	2
McGill Redmen	2	4
Victoria Vikes	2	4
Saint Mary's Huskies	0	6

Men's Pool B	W	L
Dalhouse Tigers	5	1
Manitoba Bisons	5	1
Toronto Blues	4	2
Regina Cougars	3	3
Memorial SeaHawks	2	4
Laurier Golden Hawks	2	4
Calgary Dinos	0	6

Tiebreaker 1: UPEI over Alberta

Tiebreaker 2: UPEI over Western

Semifinals: Queen's over Manitoba & UPEI over Dalhousie

Final: Queen's over UPEI

Queen's Gaels Skip - Jonathan Beuk Third - Andrew Inouye Second - Chadd Vandermade Lead - Scott Chadwick Coach - Dick Henderson

Women's Results

Women's Pool A	W	L
Laurier Golden Hawks	4	1
Waterloo Warriors	4	1
Alberta Pandas	4	1
Concordia Stingers	2	3
Dalhousie Tigers	1	4
PEI Panthers	0	5

Women's Pool B	W	L
St. Mary's Huskies	4	1
Regina Cougars	4	1
Brock Badgers	3	2
Western Mustangs	2	3
Manitoba Bisons	1	4
Calgary Dinos	1	4

Tiebreaker: Waterloo over Alberta

Semifinals: St. Mary's over Waterloo & Regina over Laurier

Final: Regina over St. Mary's (EE)

Regina Cougars Skip- Brooklyn Lemon Third - Chelsey Peterson Second - Ashley Green Lead - Nicole Lang Fifth - Sarah Watamanuk Coach - Jackie Downer

== See also ==
- Curling
- Canadian Curling Association
- University and college curling
- 2011 Winter Universiade
