= List of teams on the 2013–14 World Curling Tour =

The following is a list of teams that participated on the 2013–14 World Curling Tour.

== Men ==
As of September 25, 2013

Skip	Third	Second	Lead	Alternate	Locale
Bowie Abbis-Mills	Ritchie Gillan	Terry Scharf	Kevin Rathwell		Ottawa, Ontario
Kevin Aberle	Tim Krassman	Sheldon Schafer	Donny Zahn		Medicine Hat, Alberta
Brennan Wark (fourth)	Brian Adams, Jr. (skip)	Jordan Potts	Joel Adams		Thunder Bay, Ontario
Artur Ali	Sergey Glukhov	Dimitry Mironov	Timur Gadzhikhanov	Alexandr Kuzmin	Moscow, Russia
Mike Anderson	Mike McLean	Chris Van Huyse	Sean Harrison		Markham, Ontario
Steve Andrews	Steve Swarbrick	Donald Cody	Taylor Maryka		Coaldale, Alberta
Ted Appelman	Shawn Donnelly	Landon Bucholz	Bryce Bucholz		Edmonton, Alberta
Tom Appelman	Nathan Connolly	Brandon Klassen	Parker Konschuh		Edmonton, Alberta
Mike Aprile	Dave Pallen	D. J. Ronaldson	Shawn Cottrill		Listowel, Ontario
Evgeniy Arkhipov	Sergei Glukhov	Dmitry Mironov	Artur Razhabov	Artem Shmakov	Moscow, Russia
Rob Armitage	Keith Glover	Randy Ponich	Wilf Edgar		Red Deer, Alberta
Mike Armstrong	Tyler Lang	Daniel Selke	Jordan Raymond		Saskatoon, Saskatchewan
Roy Arndt	Kyle Duck	Jeff MacDonald	Stuart Sankey		Toronto, Ontario
Mike Assad	Matt Johnson	Peter Deboer	Jay Turner		Thunder Bay, Ontario
Alexander Attinger	Felix Attinger	Daniel Schifferli	Simon Attinger	Andre Neuenschwander	Dübendorf, Switzerland
Chris Baier	Josh Hozack	Corey Chester	Andrew Komlodi		Victoria, British Columbia
Greg Balsdon	Mark Bice	Tyler Morgan	Jamie Farnell	Steve Bice	Toronto, Ontario
Kent Beadle	Dave Jensen	Richard Maskel	Roger Smith		St. Paul, Minnesota
Ryan Berg	Tyler Runing	Evan Workin	Jordan Brown		West Fargo, North Dakota
Ben Bevan	Zach Shurtleff	Carter Adair	Ben Bernier		Ajax, Ontario
Andrew Bilesky	Stephen Kopf	Derek Errington	Aaron Watson		New Westminster, British Columbia
Todd Birr	Doug Pottinger	Tom O'Connor	Troy Schroeder		Blaine, Minnesota
Scott Bitz	Jeff Sharp	Aryn Schmidt	Dean Hicke		Regina, Saskatchewan
Matthew Blandford	Darren Moulding	Brent Hamilton	Brad Chyz		Calgary, Alberta
Trevor Bonot	Allen Macsemchuk	Chris Briand	Tim Jewett		Thunder Bay, Ontario
Andy Borland	Joe Zezel	John Borland	Mark Borland		Hibbing, Minnesota
Brendan Bottcher	Micky Lizmore	Bradley Thiessen	Karrick Martin		Edmonton, Alberta
Don Bowser	Jonathan Beuk		Scott Chadwick		Ottawa, Ontario
Tom Brewster	Greg Drummond	Scott Andrews	Michael Goodfellow	David Murdoch	Stirling, Scotland
Richard Brower	Chris Faa	Jan Bos	Deryk Brower		Vancouver, British Columbia
Craig Brown	Kroy Nernberger	Matt Hamilton	Jon Brunt		Madison, Wisconsin
Bryan Burgess	Mike Pozihun	Dale Wiersema	Pat Berezowski		Thunder Bay, Ontario
Josh Burns	Kris Sutton	Shane Parcels	Darrell Burns		Edmonton, Alberta
Derrick Casper	Stephen Dropkin	Marcus Fonger	Robert Splinter		Madison, Wisconsin
Maciej Cesarz	Adam Sterczewski	Łukasz Piworowicz	Tomasz Kierzkowski	Maciej Cylupa	Katowice, Poland
Chris Ciasnocha	Jon St. Denis	Ian Dickle	Ian Fleming		Stouffville, Ontario
Brady Clark	Sean Beighton	Darren Lehto	Phil Tilker		(Washington (state)) Lynnwood, Washington
Mathew Camm (fourth)	Chris Gardner	Brad Kidd	Bryan Cochrane (skip)		Nepean, Ontario
Spencer Cooper	Willie Jeffries	Brian Fleischhaker	Steve Forrest		Ottawa, Ontario
Terry Corbin	Kelly Schuh	Andrew Tournay	James Freeman		Brantford, Ontario
Warren Cross	Dean Darwent	Dwight Alfrey	Doug McNish		Edmonton, Alberta
Cam Culp	Chris Hanson	Richard Grant	Steven Metzger		Airdrie, Alberta
Jeff Currie	Mike McCarville	Colin Koivula	Jamie Childs		Thunder Bay, Ontario
Mark Dacey	Stuart Thompson	Stephen Burgess	Andrew Gibson		Halifax, Nova Scotia
Chad Dahlseide	Jamie Chisholm	James Wenzel	Rob Lane		Calgary, Alberta
Richard Daneault	Chris Galbraith	Braden Zawada	Mike Neufeld		Winnipeg, Manitoba
Neil Dangerfield	Dennis Sutton	Darren Boden	Glen Allen		Victoria, British Columbia
Peter de Boer	Sean Becker	Scott Becker	Kenny Thomson	Phil Dowling	Naseby, New Zealand
Benoît Schwarz (fourth)	Peter de Cruz (skip)	Dominik Märki	Valentin Tanner		Geneva, Switzerland
Don DeLair	Greg Hill	Chris Blackwell	Stephen Jensen		Airdrie, Alberta
Robert Desjardins	Frederic Lawton	Miguel Bernard	Martin Lavoie	Pierre-Luc Morissette	Saguenay, Quebec
Kevin MacKenzie (fourth)	Grant Dezura (skip)	Jamie Smith	Kevin Recksiedler		Kelowna, British Columbia
Korey Dropkin	Thomas Howell	Mark Fenner	Alex Fenson		Southborough, Massachusetts
Stephen Dropkin	Greg Persinger	Sean Murray	Michael Graziano		St. Paul, Minnesota
Andrey Drozdov	Alexey Stukalskiy	Alexey Tselousov	Petr Dron	Anton Kalalb	Moscow, Russia
Thomas Dufour	Tony Angiboust	Wilfrid Coulot	Jérémy Frarier		Chamonix, France
Scott Dunnam	Andrew Stopera	Steven Szemple			Philadelphia, Pennsylvania
Alexander Dyer	David Carr	Andrew Sprague	Adam MacMillan		Ottawa, Ontario
Dustin Eckstrand	Scott Cruickshank	Joel Peterman	Shaun Planaden		Red Deer, Alberta
Niklas Edin	Sebastian Kraupp	Fredrik Lindberg	Viktor Kjäll		Karlstad, Sweden
John Epping	Scott Bailey	Collin Mitchell	David Mathers		Toronto, Ontario
Oskar Eriksson	Kristian Lindström	Markus Eriksson	Christoffer Sundgren		Lit, Sweden
Patric Mabergs (fourth)	Gustav Eskilsson (skip)	Jesper Johansson	Johannes Patz		Skellefteå, Sweden
Krisztián Hall (fourth)	Gábor Észöl (skip)	Lajos Belleli	Balazs Varga		Budapest, Hungary
Mike Farbelow	Kevin Deeren	Kraig Deeren	Mark Lazar		St. Paul, Minnesota
Dale Fellows	Peter Lee	Bob Irwin	Lyle Biever		Spruce Grove, Alberta
Eric Fenson	Josh Bahr	Jon Chandler	Mark Haluptzok		Bemidji, Minnesota
Pete Fenson	Shawn Rojeski	Joe Polo	Ryan Brunt		Bemidji, Minnesota
Martin Ferland	François Roberge	Shawn Fowler	Maxime Elmaleh		Quebec City, Quebec
Pat Ferris	Andrew Fairfull	Craig Fairfull	Robert Larmer		Grimsby, Ontario
Ian Fitzner-Leblanc	Ian Juurlink	Graham Breckon	Kelly Mittelstadt		Lower Sackville, Nova Scotia
Kevin Flewwelling	Bill Francis	Jeff Grant	Larry Tobin		Toronto, Ontario
Markus Forejtek	Martin Egretzberger	Marcus Schmitt	Felix Purzner		Korneuburg, Austria
Rob Fowler	Allan Lyburn	Brendan Taylor	Derek Samagalski		Brandon, Manitoba
Joe Frans	Ryan Werenich	Jeff Gorda	Shawn Kaufman		Ontario
Mario Freiberger	Sven Iten	Patrick Poll	Rainer Kobler		Zug, Switzerland
Brian Gabrio	Barry Jass	Brian Jass	Ryan Morey		Blaine, Minnesota
François Gagné	Steven Munroe	Philippe Brassard	Christian Bouchard		Montreal, Quebec
Christopher Plys (fourth)	Tyler George (skip)	Rich Ruohonen	Colin Hufman		Duluth, Minnesota
Dale Gibbs	James Honsvall	Eric Schultz	Perry Tholl		St. Paul, Minnesota
Simone Gonin	Alessio Gonin	Luca Pinnacolo	Fabio Cavallo	Gabrielle Ripa di Maena	Italy
Geoff Goodland	Pete Westberg	Tim Solin	Cal Tillisch		Woodbury, Minnesota
Sean Grassie	Corey Chambers	Kody Janzen	Stuart Shiells		Winnipeg, Manitoba
James Grattan	Jason Roach	Darren Roach	Josh Barry		Oromocto, New Brunswick
Logan Gray	Glen Muirhead	Ross Paterson	Richard Woods		Stirling, Scotland
Nathan Grudnizki	Scott Comfort	Chad Moir	Doug Ewen		Wadena, Saskatchewan
Reto Gribi	Mike Wenger	Matthias Perret	Kevin Wunderlin		Biel, Switzerland
Ritvars Gulbis	Normunds Šaršūns	Aivars Avotiņš	Artūrs Gerhards	Roberts Krusts	Riga, Latvia
Brad Gushue	Brett Gallant	Adam Casey	Geoff Walker		St. John's, Newfoundland and Labrador
Stefan Häsler	Christian Bangerter	Urs Zahnd	Jörg Lüthy	Christian Roth	Bern, Switzerland
Grant Hardie	Jay McWilliam	Hammy McMillan Jr.	Billy Morton		Dumfries, Scotland
Curtis Harrish	Brian Kushinski	Tyler Wasieczko	Dan Munro		Calgary, Alberta
Jeff Hartung	Kody Hartung	Tyler Hartung	Claire DeCock		Langenburg, Saskatchewan
Jeremy Harty	Cole Parsons	Joel Berger	Gregg Hamilton		Calgary, Alberta
Marcus Hasselborg	Peder Folke	Andreas Prytz	Anton Sandström	Fredrik Nyman	Sundsvall, Sweden
Michael Hauser	Marc Wagenseil	Bastian Wyss	Etienne Lottenbach	Simon Künzli	Switzerland
Cory Heggestad	Wayne Warren	Scott Borland	Darryl MacKenzie		Barrie, Ontario
Brad Heidt	Drew Heidt	Mitch Heidt	Mitch George		Kerrobert, Saskatchewan
Josh Heidt	Brock Montgomery	Matt Lang	Dustin Kidby		Kerrobert, Saskatchewan
Wayne Heikkinen	Chris Anderson	Wendal Hulberg	Gordon Hart		Calgary, Alberta
Guy Hemmings	Ghyslain Richard	Maxime Benoit	Simon Benoit		Sorel, Quebec
Pascal Hess	Florian Meister	Meico Öhninger	Stefan Meienberg		Zug, Switzerland
Brent Ross (fourth)	Jake Higgs (skip)	Codey Maus	Bill Buchanan		Harriston, Ontario
Lloyd Hill	Scott Egger	Greg Hill	Maurice Sonier		Calgary, Alberta
Markus Høiberg	Steffen Mellemsetter	Steffen Walstad	Magnus Nedregotten		Oppdal, Norway
Glenn Howard	Wayne Middaugh	Brent Laing	Craig Savill		Penetanguishene, Ontario
Rayad Husain	Michael Checca	Jeff Brown	Travis Belchior		Brampton, Ontario
Steve Irwin	Joey Witherspoon	Travis Taylor	Travis Saban		Brandon, Manitoba
Brad Jacobs	Ryan Fry	E. J. Harnden	Ryan Harnden		Sault Ste. Marie, Ontario
Jason Jacobson	Clint Dieno	Dane Roy	Matt Froehlich		Saskatoon, Saskatchewan
Felix Schulze (fourth)	John Jahr (skip)	Peter Rickmers	Sven Goldemann		Füssen, Germany
Mike Jakubo	Jordan Chandler	Sandy MacEwan	Lee Toner		Sudbury, Ontario
Michael Johnson (fourth)	Dean Joanisse (skip)	Paul Cseke	John Cullen		New Westminster, British Columbia
Josh Johnston	Wes Johnson	Matt Lowe	Ryan Parker		Toronto, Ontario
Todd Jones	Andrew McMullen	Pat Crozier	Rob Tuit		Victoria, British Columbia
Joel Jordison	Jason Ackerman	Brent Goeres	Curtis Horwath		Regina, Saskatchewan
Shawn Joyce	Dale Craig	Dustin Phillips	Cory Fleming		Saskatoon, Saskatchewan
Konstantin Kämpf	Daniel Neuner	Alexander Kämpf	Dominik Greindl	Sebastian Jacoby	Füssen, Germany
Aku Kauste	Jani Sullanmaa	Pauli Jäämies	Janne Pitko	Leo Mäkelä	Hyvinkaa, Finland
Mark Kean	Travis Fanset	Patrick Janssen	Tim March		Ontario
Greg Keith	Tyler Pfeiffer	Jordan Penner	Martin Pederson		Spruce Grove, Alberta
Kim Chang-min	Kim Min-chan	Seong Se-hyeon	Seo Young-seon	Oh Eun-su	Uiseong, South Korea
Kim Soo-hyuk	Kim Tae-huan	Park Jong-duk	Nam Yoon-ho	Yang Ye-jun	South Korea
Jamie King	Blake MacDonald	Scott Pfeifer	Jeff Erickson		Edmonton, Alberta
Lukas Klima	Ondrej Hurtik	Krystof Chaloupek	Samuel Mokris	Michal Laznicka	Prague, Czech Republic
Craig Kochan	Phil Loevenmark	Andrew Clayton	Geoff Chambers	Bob Leclair	Toronto, Ontario
Stefan Turna (fourth)	Pavel Kocian (skip)	Ronald Krcmar	Radomir Vozar	David Misum	Bratislava, Slovakia
Jamie Koe	Tom Naugler	Brad Chorostkowski	Rob Borden		Yellowknife, Northwest Territories
Kevin Koe	Pat Simmons	Carter Rycroft	Nolan Thiessen		Calgary, Alberta
Jared Kolomaya	Neil Kitching	Kennedy Bird	Daniel Hunt		Winnipeg, Manitoba
Bruce Korte	Dean Kleiter	Roger Korte	Rob Markowsky		Saskatoon, Saskatchewan
David Kraichy	Andrew Irving	Taylor McIntyre	Brad Van Walleghem		Winnipeg, Manitoba
Richard Krell	Chris Lewis	Andrew Dunbar	John Gabel		Kitchener, Ontario
Josh Lambden	Morio Kumagawa	Chris McDonah	Andrew Stevenson		Airdrie, Alberta
Steve Laycock	Kirk Muyres	Colton Flasch	Dallan Muyres		Saskatoon, Saskatchewan
Marc LeCocq	Andy McCann	Scott Jones	Jamie Brannen		Fredericton Junction, New Brunswick
Alex Leichter	Brandon Corbett	Derek Corbett	Jeff Pulli		(New York (state)) Rochester, New York
Philippe Lemay	Mathieu Beaufort	Jean-Michel Arsenault	Erik Lachance		Trois-Rivières, Quebec
Clint Cudmore (fourth)	Dan Lemieux (skip)	Stephane Lemieux	Marc Barrette		Sault Ste. Marie, Ontario
Ryan Lemke	Nathan Gebert	John Lilla	Casey Konopacky		Medford, Wisconsin
Brian Lewis	Jeff McCrady	Steve Doty	Graham Sinclair		Ottawa, Ontario
Mike Libbus	Kevin Muir	Brad MacInnis	Peter Keenan		Black Diamond, Alberta
John Lilla		Bryan Hanson	Joel Cooper (Note: Cooper is now known as JayCee due to gender transition.)		St. Paul, Minnesota
Bernhard Lips	Marco Bundi	Christian Oker	Philipp Muths		Urdorf, Switzerland
Liu Rui	Zang Jialiang	Xu Xiaoming	Ba Dexin		Harbin, China
Rob Lobel	Steven Lobel	Trevor Hewitt	Patrick Greenman		Whitby, Ontario
William Lyburn	Alex Forrest	Connor Njegovan	Tyler Forrest		Winnipeg, Manitoba
Ian MacAulay	Steve Allen	Rick Allen	Barry Conrad		Ottawa, Ontario
Eddie MacKenzie	Tyler MacKenzie	Anson Carmody	Sean Ledgerwood		Charlottetown, Prince Edward Island
Kevin MacKenzie	Grant Dezura	Jamie Smith	Kevin Recksiedler		Kelowna, British Columbia
Paul Madgett	Rob Melhuish	Don Pearson	Al Kirchner		Oakville, Ontario
Rob Maksymetz	Evan Asmussen	Sean Morris			Grande Prairie, Alberta
Jason Malcho	George White	Rob Malcho	Mark Monteith		Stratford, Ontario
Dean Mamer	Vance Elder	Jason Stannard	Wallace Hollingshead		Calgary, Alberta
Scott Manners	Carl Smith	Ryan Deis	Mark Larsen		North Battleford, Saskatchewan
William Kuran (fourth)	Kelly Marnoch (skip)	Brandon Jorgensen	Chris Cameron		Carberry, Manitoba
Kevin Marsh	Matt Ryback	Daniel Marsh	Aaron Shutra		Saskatoon, Saskatchewan
Bert Martin	Rhett Friesz	Jon Rennie	Brad Kokoroyannis		Airdrie, Alberta
Kevin Martin	David Nedohin	Marc Kennedy	Ben Hebert		Edmonton, Alberta
Kenton Maschmeyer	Ben Bellamy	Brayden Power	Brayden Oswald		Edmonton, Alberta
Heath McCormick	Bill Stopera	Martin Sather	Dean Gemmell		(New York (state)) New York City, New York
Scott McDonald	Brent Dekoning	Connor Duhaime	Simon Barrick		London, Ontario
Mike McEwen	B. J. Neufeld	Matt Wozniak	Denni Neufeld		Winnipeg, Manitoba
Terry Meek	Adrian Bakker	Eugene Doherty	Keith Mason		Calgary, Alberta
Jean-Michel Ménard	Martin Crête	Éric Sylvain	Philippe Ménard		Gatineau, Quebec
Ethan Meyers	Kyle Kakela	Trevor Host	Quinn Evenson		Duluth, Minnesota
Sven Michel	Claudio Pätz	Sandro Trolliet	Simon Gempeler		Adelboden, Switzerland
Ben Mikkelsen	Taylor Kallos	Brian Skinner	Brendan Berbenuik		Thunder Bay, Ontario
Dennis Moretto	Paul Attard	Howard Steele	Mike Nelson		Ontario
Yusuke Morozumi	Tsuyoshi Yamaguchi	Tetsuro Shimizu	Kosuke Morozumi		Karuizawa, Japan
Jim Cotter (fourth)	John Morris (skip)	Tyrel Griffith	Rick Sawatsky	Jason Gunnlaugson	Vernon, British Columbia
Amos Mosaner	Andrea Pilzer	Daniele Ferazza	Roberto Arman	Sebastiano Arman	Trentino, Italy
David Murdoch	Tom Brewster	Greg Drummond	Michael Goodfellow	Scott Andrews	Stirling, Scotland
Jamie Murphy	Jordan Pinder	Mike Bardsley	Don McDermaid		Halifax, Nova Scotia
Ryan Myler	Shane Latimer	Kevin Lagerquist	Evan DeViller		Brampton, Ontario
André Neuenschwander	Tobias Güntensberger	Sergio Gobbi	Kevin Keller		Switzerland
Peter Nielsen	Evan Branter	Kyle Duncan	David Macdonald		Vancouver, British Columbia
Sean O'Connor	Rob Johnson	Ryan O'Connor	Dan Bubola		Calgary, Alberta
Mark Olson	Paul Rudkin	Ryan Spielman	Aaron Richards		Janesville, Wisconsin
Fritz Oswal	Bruno Zuber	Markus Zehnder	Remo Jegi		Urdorf, Switzerland
Kevin Park	Barry Chwedoruk	Eric Richard	Doug Stambaugh		Edmonton, Alberta
Shane Park	Tony Germsheid	Aaron Sarafinchan	Phil Hemming		Edmonton, Alberta
Matt Paul	Brett Lyon-Hatcher	Ben Miskew	John Steski	Colin Dow	Ottawa, Ontario
Trevor Perepolkin	Deane Horning	Tyler Orme	Chris Anderson		Vernon, British Columbia
Marc Pfister	Roger Meier	Enrico Pfister	Raphael Märki	Michael Bösiger	Bern, Switzerland
Sean Geall (fourth)	Brent Pierce (skip)	Sebastien Robillard	Mark Olson		New Westminster, British Columbia
Darryl Prebble	Denis Belanger	Mark Koivula	Dennis Lemon		Toronto, Ontario
Howard Rajala	J. P. Lachance	Chris Fulton	Paul Madden		Ottawa, Ontario
Scott Ramsay	Mark Taylor	Ross McFadyen	Kyle Werenich		Winnipeg, Manitoba
Tomi Rantamäki	Pekka Peura	Kimmo Ilvonen	Jermu Pöllanen		Helsinki, Finland
Fraser Reid	Spencer Nuttall	Jack Lindsey	Richard Seto		Waterloo, Ontario
Sanjay Bowry (fourth)	Nolan Reid (skip)	Calvin Heels	Byron Heels		Victoria, British Columbia
Rob Retchless	Punit Sthankiya	Dave Ellis	Rob Ainsley		Toronto, Ontario
Jeff Richard	Tom Shypitka	Jay Wakefield	David Harper		Kelowna, British Columbia
Greg Richardson	Frank O'Driscoll	Dan Baird	Mike Potter		Ottawa, Ontario
Nick Rizzo	Jim Wilson	Tom Roblin	Rob Gregg		Brantford, Ontario
Chris Lemishka (fourth)	Dean Ross (skip)				Edmonton, Alberta
Gary Rowe	Mike Stachon	Jesse Ruppell	Keith Coulthart		Ottawa, Ontario
Michael Roy	Karsten Sturmay	Jordan MacKenzie	Mac Lenton		Airdrie, Alberta
Manuel Ruch	Jean-Nicolas Longchamp	Mathias Graf	Christian Moser		Uitikon, Switzerland
Roman Ruch	Rolf Bruggmann	Fabian Schmid	Michael Devaux	Felix Bader	Uzwil, Switzerland
Rob Rumfeldt	Adam Spencer	Scott Hodgson	Scott Howard		Ontario
Tom Sallows	Jordan Steinke	Matthew Brown	Kendell Warawa		Edmonton, Alberta
Michael Schifferli	Christian Durtschi	Stefan Schori	Jonas Wälchli	Andreas Schorer	Bern, Switzerland
Robert Schlender	Aaron Sluchinski	Justin Sluchinski	Dylan Webster		Airdrie, Alberta
Thomas Scoffin	Dylan Gousseau	Jaques Bellamy	Andrew O'Dell		Edmonton, Alberta
Randie Shen	Brendon Liu	Nicolas Hsu	Justin Hsu		Taipei, Chinese Taipei
Michael Shepherd	Jordan Keon	Curtis Samoy	Michael Keon		Richmond Hill, Ontario
Danny Sherrard	Kyle Reynolds	Scott McClements	Todd Kaasten		Edmonton, Alberta
John Shuster	Jeff Isaacson	Jared Zezel	John Landsteiner		Duluth, Minnesota
Lyle Sieg	Andy Jukich		Duane Rutan		(Washington (state)) Tacoma, Washington
Steen Sigurdson	Riley Smith	Ian McMillan	Nick Curtis		Winnipeg, Manitoba
David Šik	Radek Boháč	Thomas Paul	Milan Polívka		Prague, Czech Republic
Kyle Smith	Thomas Muirhead	Kyle Waddell	Cammy Smith		Perth, Scotland
Scott Smith	James Keats	Colton Goller	Nicholas Rabl		Calgary, Alberta
Jiří Snítil	Martin Snítil	Jindřich Kitzberger	Marek Vydra	Jakub Bareš	Prague, Czech Republic
Aaron Squires	David Easter	Wesley Forget	Jordan Moreau		St. Thomas, Ontario
Mel Steffin	Steve Wright	Brett Kury	John Homenuke		Surrey, British Columbia
Les Steuber	Regan Furhop	Troy Monea	Glen Hansen		Edmonton, Alberta
Chad Stevens	Cameron MacKenzie	Scott Saccary	Philip Crowell		Halifax, Nova Scotia
Rasmus Stjerne	Johnny Frederiksen	Mikkel Poulsen	Troels Harry	Lars Vilandt	Hvidovre, Denmark
Alexander Stocker	Kevin Pescia	Roger Hämmerli	Alexander Schaier	Pascal Eicher	Zürich, Switzerland
Peter Stolt	Brad Caldwell	Tim Jeanetta	Matt Fowler		Plymouth, Minnesota
Jeff Stoughton	Jon Mead	Reid Carruthers	Mark Nichols	Garth Smith	Winnipeg, Manitoba
John Stroh	Jeff Bodin	Matt Heller	Shea Jackson		Medicine Hat, Alberta
Marc Suter	Michael Müller	Daniel Gubler	Michel Harcuba		Switzerland
Tyler Tardi	Jordan Tardi	Nicholas Meister	Zachary Umbach		Langley, British Columbia
Charley Thomas	Colin Hodgson	Matthew Ng	Mike Westlund		Calgary, Alberta
Wayne Tuck, Jr.	Chad Allen	Jay Allen	Caleb Flaxey		Brantford, Ontario
Thomas Ulsrud	Torger Nergård	Christoffer Svae	Håvard Vad Petersson		Oslo, Norway
Mikel Unanue	Inaki Lasuen	Victor Mirete	Avelino Garcia		San Sebastián, Spain
Craig Van Ymeren	Matt Mapletoft	Scott Brandon	Shane Konings		Aylmer, Ontario
Daylan Vavrek	Jason Ginter	Tristan Steinke	Brett Winfield		Dawson Creek, British Columbia
Brock Virtue	Braeden Moskowy	Chris Schille	D. J. Kidby		Regina, Saskatchewan
Michal Vojtus	Petr Sulc	Jakub Kovac	Vaclav Novak	Pavel Janota	Prague, Czech Republic
Jake Vukich	Evan McAuley	Luc Violette	Kyle Lorvick		(Washington (state)) Seattle, Washington
Jake Walker	Dayna Deruelle	Andrew McGaugh	Michael McGaugh		Brampton, Ontario
Wang Fengchun	Jiang Dongxu	Chen Han	Wang Zhiqiang		Harbin, China
Scott Webb	Ryan Konowalyk	Steve Byrne	Jesse Sopko		Peace River, Alberta
Bernhard Werthemann	Bastian Brun	Yves Hess	Paddy Käser		Bern, Switzerland
Wade White	Kevin Tym	Dan Holowaychuk	George White		Edmonton, Alberta
Matt Willerton	Jeremy Hodges	Craig MacAlpine	Chris Evernden		Edmonton, Alberta
Mark Willmert	Evan Jensen	Dan Ruehl	Daniel Metcalf		St. Paul, Minnesota
Rasmus Wranå	Jordan Wåhlin	Axel Sjöberg	Daniel Lövstrand	Mats Wranå	Sundbyberg, Sweden
Kevin Yablonski	Vance Elder	Harrison Boss	Matthew McDonald		Calgary, Alberta
Zou Dejia	Bai Yang	Wang Jinbo	Zhang Rongrui	Wang Peng	Harbin, China

== Women ==
As of September 30, 2013

Skip	Third	Second	Lead	Alternate	Locale
Lindsey Allen	Sara Gartner	Krista Crowther	Sarah Horne		Calgary, Alberta
Amy Lou Anderson	Shelly Kinney	Theresa Hoffoss	Julie Smith	Megan Delaney	St. Paul, Minnesota
Sarah Anderson	Kathleen Dubberstein	Taylor Anderson	Leilani Dubberstein		Pennsylvania
Meghan Armit	Nikki Hawrylyshen	Sarah Lund	Nadine Cabak-Ralph		Winnipeg, Manitoba
Mary-Anne Arsenault	Kim Kelly	Christie Gamble	Jennifer Baxter		Halifax, Nova Scotia
Cathy Auld	Janet Murphy	Stephanie Gray	Melissa Foster	Clancy Grandy	Ontario
Greta Aurell	Tilde Vermelin	Camilla Schnabel	Almida de Val		Harnosands, Sweden
Marika Bakewell	Jessica Corrado	Stephanie Corrado	Jasmine Thurston		Markdale, Ontario
Brett Barber	Samantha Yachiw	Meaghan Freirichs			Biggar, Saskatchewan
Penny Barker	Deanna Doig	Tamara Haberstock	Sarah Slywka		Regina, Saskatchewan
Ève Bélisle	Joelle Belley	Martine Comeau	Camille Lapierre		Montreal, Quebec
Cheryl Bernard	Susan O'Connor	Lori Olson-Johns	Shannon Aleksic	Carolyn McRorie	Calgary, Alberta
Shannon Birchard	Jenna Boisvert	Taylor Maida	Katrina Thiessen		Winnipeg, Manitoba
Suzanne Birt	Shelly Bradley	Michelle McQuaid	Susan McInnis		Charlottetown, Prince Edward Island
Desiree Borsato	Brittany Palmer	Courtney Schmidt	Stacey Ludwar		Beaver Valley, British Columbia
Chelsea Brandwood	Claire Greenlees	Jordan Brandwood	Danielle Greenlees		Grimsby, Ontario
Corryn Brown	Erin Pincott	Samantha Fisher	Sydney Fraser		Kamloops, British Columbia
Erika Brown	Debbie McCormick	Jessica Schultz	Ann Swisshelm		Madison, Wisconsin
Joelle Brown	Alyssa Vandepoele	Jolene Rutter	Kelsey Hinds		Winnipeg, Manitoba
Norma Brown	Katie Crump	Heather Wilson	Tracy Slatnik		Alberta
Chrissy Cadorin	Katie Lindsay	Stephanie Thompson	Lauren Wood		Toronto, Ontario
Kate Cameron	Erika Sigurdson	Sheyna Andries	Lindsay Baldock		Stonewall, Manitoba
Chelsea Carey	Kristy McDonald	Kristen Foster	Lindsay Titheridge		Winnipeg, Manitoba
Alexandra Carlson		Emilia Juocys	Sherri Schummer		St. Paul, Minnesota
Katrina Carr	Jen Ahde	Corrie Wimmer	Sarah Wallace		Ottawa, Ontario
Heather Carr Olmstead	Tara Maxwell	Jennifer Omand DesRochers	Heather Marshall		Ontario
Mary Chilvers	Andrea Lawes	Kelly Evans	Debbie Thompson		Ontario
Cory Christensen	Rebecca Funk	Anna Bauman	Sonja Bauman		Duluth, Minnesota
Andrea Crawford	Rebecca Atkinson	Danielle Parsons	Jodie deSolla		Fredericton, New Brunswick
Laura Crocker	Erin Carmody	Rebecca Pattinson	Jen Gates		Edmonton, Alberta
Delia DeJong	Amy Janko	Brittany Whittemore	Stephanie Yanishewski		Grande Prairie, Alberta
Janais DeJong	Karli Makichuk	Kaitlyn Sherrer	Lindsay Janko		Grande Prairie, Alberta
Stacie Devereaux	Erin Porter	Marie Christianson	Noelle Thomas-Kennell	Julie Devereaux	St. John's, Newfoundland and Labrador
Tanilla Doyle	Lindsay Amundsen-Meyer	Dayna Connolly	Christina Faulkner		Calgary, Alberta
Daniela Driendl	Martina Linder	Marika Trettin	Analena Jentsch		Füssen, Germany
Chantelle Eberle	Cindy Ricci	Nancy Inglis	Debbie Lozinski		Regina, Saskatchewan
Kerri Einarson	Selena Kaatz	Liz Fyfe	Kristin MacCuish	Cheryl Neufeld	Gimli, Manitoba
Michelle Englot	Candace Chisholm	Roberta Materi	Kristy Johnson		Regina, Saskatchewan
Kelly Erickson	Lindsay Makichuk	Kristina Hadden	Alison Kotylak		Edmonton, Alberta
Lisa Eyamie	Desirée Owen	Jodi Marthaller	Stephanie Malekoff		Grande Prairie, Alberta
Karen Fallis	Sam Murata	Jennifer Clark-Rourie	Megan Brett		Winnipeg, Manitoba
Lisa Farnell	Erin Morrissey	Karen Sagle	Ainsley Galbraith		Elgin, Ontario
Binia Feltscher	Irene Schori	Franziska Kaufmann	Christine Urech		Flims, Switzerland
Allison Flaxey	Katie Pringle	Lynn Kreviazuk	Morgan Court		Listowel, Ontario
Hannah Fleming	Lauren Gray	Jennifer Dodds	Alice Spence		Stirling, Scotland
Stacey Fordyce	Kelsey Russill	Janelle Schwindt	Roslynn Ripley		Brandon, Manitoba
Liane Fossum	Kim Zsakai	Lisa Auld	Victoria Anderson		Thunder Bay, Ontario
Diane Foster	Judy Pendergast	Terri Loblaw	Sue Fulkerth		Calgary, Alberta
Genevieve Frappier	Josee Friolet	Catherine Lavigne	Kim Beardsell		Longue-Pointe, Quebec
Suzanne Frick	Carol Jackson	Christine Loube	Bernie Gilette		Guelph, Ontario
Satsuki Fujisawa	Miyo Ichikawa	Emi Shimizu	Miyuki Satoh	Chiaki Matsumura	Karuizawa, Japan
Vendy Blazkova (fourth)	Fabienne Furbringer (skip)	Sina Wettstein	Nora Baumann	Fabienne Ubersax	Uitikon, Switzerland
Kerry Galusha	Ashley Green	Megan Cormier	Wendy Miller		Yellowknife, Northwest Territories
Tiffany Game	Vanessa Pouliot	Jennifer Van Wieren	Melissa Pierce		Edmonton, Alberta
Jaimee Gardner	Katelyn Wasylkiw	Emilie Metcalfe	Erin Jenkins	Heather Cridland	Guelph, Ontario
Courtney George	Aileen Sormunen	Amanda McLean	Monica Walker		St. Paul, Minnesota
Rebecca Turley (fourth)	Amy Gibson (skip)	Carman Cheng	Michelle Dunn		Vancouver, British Columbia
Lisa Hogle (fourth)		Lori McCluskey	Alison Goring (skip)		Oshawa, Ontario
Heather Graham	Margie Hewitt	Amy Balsdon	Abbie Darnley		King, Ontario
Michelle Gribi	Lisa Gisler	Chantal Bugnon	Vera Camponono		Biel, Switzerland
Jenna Haag	Erin Wallace	Grace Gabower	Brittany Falk		Janesville, Wisconsin
Teryn Hamilton	Hayley Furst	Jody Keim	Heather Hansen		Calgary, Alberta
Jenn Hanna	Pascale Letendre	Stephanie Hanna	Lisa Paddle		Ottawa, Ontario
Colleen Hannah	Simone Groundwater	Laura Ball	Cynthia Parton		Maple Ridge, British Columbia
Jacqueline Harrison	Kimberly Tuck	Susan Froud	Andra Aldred	Jordan Ariss	Brantford, Ontario
Janet Harvey	Cherie-Ann Loder	Kristin Loder	Carey Kirby		Winnipeg, Manitoba
Anna Hasselborg	Karin Rudström	Agnes Knochenhauer	Zandra Flyg		Gävle, Sweden
Julie Hastings	Cheryl McPherson	Stacey Smith	Katrina Collins	Christy Trombley	Thornhill, Ontario
Dezaray Hawes	Gabrielle Plonka	Ali Renwick	Casey Freeman		Anmore, British Columbia
Kendall Haymes	Holly Donaldson	Cassie Savage	Megan Arnold		Kitchener, Ontario
Ursi Hegner	Nina Ledergerber	Chantal Schmid	Claudia Baumann	Sarah Vogel	Uzwil, Switzerland
Amber Holland	Jolene Campbell	Dailene Sivertson	Brooklyn Lemon		Regina, Saskatchewan
Rachel Homan	Emma Miskew	Alison Kreviazuk	Lisa Weagle		Ottawa, Ontario
Tracy Horgan	Jenn Horgan	Jenna Enge	Amanda Gates		Sudbury, Ontario
Michèle Jäggi	Marisa Winkelhausen	Stéphanie Jäggi	Melanie Barbezat		Bern, Switzerland
Heather Jensen	Darah Provencal	Shana Snell	Morgan Muise		Calgary, Alberta
Shawna Jensen	Tatianna Simicic	Merit Thorson	Jade Shultis		Delta, British Columbia
Jiang Yilun	Wang Rui	Yaoi Mingyue	She Qiutong		Harbin, China
Lisa Johnson	Michelle Kryzalka	Natalie Holloway	Shauna Nordstrom		Spruce Grove, Alberta
Jennifer Jones	Kaitlyn Lawes	Jill Officer	Dawn Askin		Winnipeg, Manitoba
Tracey Jones	Falon Burkitt	Kay Lynn Thompson	Melinda Kotsch		Prince George, British Columbia
Sherry Just	Alyssa Despins	Jenna Harrison	Sharlene Clarke		Saskatoon, Saskatchewan
Ashley Kallos	Oye-Sem Briand	Laura Vieira	Jessica Williams		Thunder Bay, Ontario
Jessie Kaufman	Tiffany Steuber	Dayna Demmans	Stephanie Enright		Spruce Grove, Alberta
Nicky Kaufman	Pam Appelman	Brittany Zelmer	Jennifer Sheehan		Edmonton, Alberta
Colleen Kilgallen	Janice Blair	Leslie Wilson-Westcott	Lesle Cafferty		Pinawa, Manitoba
Kim Eun-jung	Kim Gyeong-ae	Kim Seon-yeong	Kim Yeong-mi		Gyeongbuk, South Korea
Kim Ji-sun	Gim Eun-ji	Shin Mi-sung	Lee Seul-bee	Um Min-ji	Gyeonggi-do, South Korea
Shannon Kleibrink	Bronwen Webster	Kalynn Park	Chelsey Matson		Calgary, Alberta
Patti Knezevic	Jen Rusnell	Kristen Fewster	Rhonda Camozzi		Prince George, British Columbia
Touri Koana	Junko Sonobe	Midori Hachimaru	Riko Toyoda		Yamanashi, Japan
Sarah Koltun	Chelsea Duncan	Patty Wallingham	Andrea Sinclair	Jenna Duncan	Whitehorse, Yukon
Jackie Komyshyn	Amanda Tycholis	Kari Kammerlock	Kristie Moroz		Winnipeg, Manitoba
Anna Kubešková	Tereza Plíšková	Klára Svatoňová	Veronika Herdová	Martina Strnadová	Prague, Czech Republic
Roberta Kuhn	Karla Thompson	Brooklyn Leitch	Michelle Ramsay		Kamloops, British Columbia
Chantal Lalonde	Ginger Coyle	Rachelle Vink	Tess Bobble		Woodstock, Ontario
Patti Lank	Cory Christensen	Mackenzie Lank	Caitlin Maroldo		(New York (state)) Lewiston, New York
Kelley Law	Kirsten Fox	Kristen Recksiedler	Trysta Vandale		New Westminster, British Columbia
Stefanie Lawton	Sherry Anderson	Sherri Singler	Marliese Kasner		Saskatoon, Saskatchewan
Charrissa Lin	Sherri Schummer	Stephanie Jensen	Emilia Juocys		St. Paul, Minnesota
Abigayle Lindgren	Katie Sigurdson	Emily Lindgren	Kelsey Colwell		Grand Forks, North Dakota
Kim Link	Susan Baleja	Angela Wickman	Renee Fletcher		East St. Paul, Manitoba
Towe Lundman	Amalia Rudstrom	Elina Backman	Johanna Heldin	Anna Gustafsson	Uppsala, Sweden
Allison MacInnes	Grace MacInnes	Diane Gushulak	Amanda Tipper		Kamloops, British Columbia
Kelly MacIntosh	Kristen MacDiarmid	Jennifer Crouse	Karlee Jones		Dartmouth, Nova Scotia
Isabelle Maillard	Christelle Moura	Anne Grandjean	Camille Hornisberger	Pauline Jeanneret	Lausanne, Switzerland
Marla Mallett	Kelly Shimizu	Adina Tasaka	Shannon Ward		Cloverdale, British Columbia
Briar Hürlimann (fourth)	Corina Mani (skip)	Rahel Thoma	Tamara Michel		Bern, Switzerland
Lauren Mann	Courtney Hodgson	Patricia Hill	Jenna Bonner		Peterborough, Ontario
Vicki Marianchuk	Louise Germain	Carolyn Edison	Lynne Corrado		Ontario
Nancy Martin	Shalon Fleming	Lindsey Sunderland	Michelle Chabot		Saskatoon, Saskatchewan
Chana Martineau	Candace Reid	Kara Lindholm	Kandace Lindholm		Edmonton, Alberta
Jody Maskiewich	Jenn Howard	Stephanie Prinse	Katye Gyles		New Westminster, British Columbia
Kimberly Mastine	Nathalie Audet	Audree Dufresne	Saskia Hollands		Montreal, Quebec
Krista McCarville	Ashley Miharija	Kari Lavoie	Sarah Lang	Tirzah Keffer	Thunder Bay, Ontario
Deb McCreanor	Robin Campbell	Laurie Macdonell	Meghan Knutson		La Salle, Manitoba
Susan McKnight	Catherine Kaino	Karen Rowsell	Joanne Curtis		Uxbridge, Ontario
Jonna McManus	Sara McManus	Anna Huhta	Sofia Mabergs		Gävle, Sweden
Breanne Meakin	Ashley Howard	Briane Meilleur	Krysten Karwacki		Winnipeg, Manitoba
Angie Melaney	Dominique Lascelles	Marteen Lortie	Jennifer Rosborough		Lakefield, Ontario
Sherry Middaugh	Jo-Ann Rizzo	Lee Merklinger	Leigh Armstrong	Lori Eddy	Coldwater, Ontario
Lindsay Miners	Dawna Premo	Megan St. Amand	Michelle MacLeod		Sault Ste. Marie, Ontario
Victorya Moiseeva	Nkeiruka Ezekh	Ekaterina Antonova	Aleksandra Saitova		Moscow, Russia
Michelle Montford	Lisa DeRiviere	Sara Van Walleghem	Sarah Neufeld	Courtney Blanchard	Winnipeg, Manitoba
Kristie Moore	Sarah Wilkes	Ashleigh Clark	Kyla MacLachlan		Sexsmith, Alberta
Katie Morrissey	Shannon Harrington	Cassandra de Groot	Kiri Campbell		Ottawa, Ontario
Mari Motohashi	Yurika Yoshida	Yumi Suzuki	Megumi Mabuchi		Kitami, Japan
Eve Muirhead	Anna Sloan	Vicki Adams	Claire Hamilton		Stirling, Scotland
Larisa Murray	Amanda Craigie	Leah Mihalicz	Nicole Lang		Regina, Saskatchewan
Heather Nedohin	Beth Iskiw	Jessica Mair	Laine Peters		Edmonton, Alberta
Deanne Nichol	Dawn Corbeil	Heather Stewart	Cory Wickberg		Peace River, Alberta
Hollie Nicol	Stephanie LeDrew	Danielle Inglis	Courtney Davies	Heather Nicol	Toronto, Ontario
Lene Nielsen	Helle Simonsen	Jeanne Ellegaard	Maria Poulsen		Hvidovre, Denmark
Amy Nixon	Nadine Chyz	Whitney Eckstrand	Heather Rogers		Calgary, Alberta
Brit O'Neill	Jamie Sinclair	Kim Brown	Trish Scharf		Ottawa, Ontario
Kathy O'Rourke	Meaghan Hughes	Robyn Green	Tricia Affleck		Charlottetown, Prince Edward Island
Ayumi Ogasawara	Yumie Funayama	Kaho Onodera	Michiko Tomabechi	Chinami Yoshida	Sapporo, Japan
Pam Oleinik	Laurie Rahn	Stephanie Martin	Julie Denten		Chicago, Illinois
Cissi Östlund	Sabina Kraupp	Sara Carlsson	Paulina Stein		Karlstad, Sweden
Oihane Otaegi	Leire Otaegi	Iera Irazusta	Asuncion Manterola	Aitana Saenz	San Sebastián, Spain
Mirjam Ott	Carmen Schäfer	Carmen Küng	Janine Greiner		Davos, Switzerland
Alina Pätz	Nadine Lehmann	Nicole Schwägli	Nicole Dünki		Basel, Switzerland
Trish Paulsen	Kari Kennedy	Sarah Collin	Kari Paulsen		Saskatoon, Saskatchewan
Laura Payne	Alexis Riordan	Jessica Barcauskas	Janie Wall		Ottawa, Ontario
Roxane Perron	Marie-Josee Fortier	Sonia Delisle	Miriam Perron		Trois-Rivières, Quebec
Jocelyn Peterman	Brittany Tran	Rebecca Konschuh	Kristine Anderson		Red Deer, Alberta
Samantha Peters	Jackie Peters	Julie Frame	Laura Roe		Ottawa, Ontario
Beth Peterson	Robyn Njegovan	Melissa Gordon	Breanne Yozenko		Winnipeg, Manitoba
Sarah Picton	Lynne Flegel	Claire Archer	Marit Lee		Ontario
Cassie Potter	Jamie Haskell	Jackie Lemke	Steph Sambor		St. Paul, Minnesota
Allison Pottinger	Nicole Joraanstad	Natalie Nicholson	Tabitha Peterson		Bemidji, Minnesota
Sanna Puustinen	Oona Kauste	Heidi Hossi	Marjo Hippi		Helsinki, Finland
Julie Reddick	Carrie Lindner	Megan Balsdon	Laura Hickey		Toronto, Ontario
Evita Regža	Dace Regža	Ieva Bērziņa	Žaklīna Litauniece		Jelgava, Latvia
Marilou Richter	Sandra Comadina	Jami McMartin	Jennifer Allen		New Westminster, British Columbia
Brenda Ridgway	Leslie Shearer	Susan Chepil	Lois Russel		Nanaimo, British Columbia
Darcy Robertson	Tracey Lavery	Vanessa Foster	Michelle Kruk		Winnipeg, Manitoba
Kelsey Rocque	Keely Brown	Taylor McDonald	Claire Tully		Edmonton, Alberta
Leslie Rogers	Kathleen Dunbar	Jenilee Goertzen	Kelsey Latawiec		Edmonton, Alberta
Allison Ross	Melissa Gannon	Brittany O'Rourke	Pamela Nugent		Montreal, Quebec
Alanna Routledge	Sian Canavan	Laura Wood	Joelle St-Hilaire		Montreal, Quebec
Kristy Russell	Michelle Gray	Tina Mazerolle	Allison Singh		Elora, Ontario
Bobbie Sauder	Heather Kushnir	Lisa Miller	Joelle Trawick		Edmonton, Alberta
Casey Scheidegger	Denise Kinghorn	Jessie Scheidegger	Kimberly Anderson		Lethbridge, Alberta
Danielle Schmiemann	Kate Goodhelpsen	Brenna Bilassy	Rebecca Allen		Edmonton, Alberta
Kim Schneider	Michelle McIvor	Robyn Despins	Shelby Hubick		Kronau, Saskatchewan
Andrea Schöpp	Imogen Oona Lehmann	Corinna Scholz	Stella Heiß		Füssen, Germany
Kelly Scott	Jeanna Schraeder	Sasha Carter	Sarah Wazney		Kelowna, British Columbia
Mandy Selzer	Erin Selzer	Kristen Mitchell	Megan Selzer		Balgonie, Saskatchewan
Jill Shumay	Kara Johnston	Taryn Holtby	Jinaye Ayrey		Maidstone, Saskatchewan
Anna Sidorova	Liudmila Privivkova	Margarita Fomina	Ekaterina Galkina		Moscow, Russia
Maria Prytz (fourth)	Christina Bertrup	Maria Wennerström	Margaretha Sigfridsson (skip)		Härnösand, Sweden
Margie Smith	Norma O'Leary	Debbie Dexter	Shelly Kosal		St. Paul, Minnesota
Heather Smith-Dacey	Jill Mouzar	Blisse Comstock	Teri Lake		Halifax, Nova Scotia
Renée Sonnenberg	Lawnie McDonald	Cary-Anne McTaggart	Rona Pasika		Grande Prairie, Alberta
Nina Spatola	Becca Hamilton	Tara Peterson	Sophie Brorson		Madison, Wisconsin
Barb Spencer	Katie Spencer	Ainsley Champagne	Raunora Westcott		Winnipeg, Manitoba
Jennifer Spencer	Jaimee Gardner	Amanda Gebhardt	Becky Philpott		Guelph, Ontario
Iveta Staša-Šaršūne	Ieva Krusta	Zanda Bikše	Dace Munča	Una Ģērmane	Jelgava, Latvia
Ros Stewart	Patty Hersikorn	Kailena McDonald	Andrea Rudulier		Saskatoon, Saskatchewan
Maureen Stolt	Jordan Moulton	Kendall Behm	Libby Brundage		St. Paul, Minnesota
Kristen Streifel	Elyse Lafrance	Ashley Skjerdal	Karlee Korchinski		Saskatoon, Saskatchewan
Kaitlin Stubbs	Vanessa McConnell	Valerie Hamende	Alice MacKay		Calgary, Alberta
Karallee Swabb	Brenda Doroshuk	Cindy Talaga	Melanie Swabb		Edmonton, Alberta
Valerie Sweeting	Dana Ferguson	Joanne Taylor	Rachelle Pidherny		Edmonton, Alberta
Ildikó Szekeres	Ágnes Patonai	Blanka Pathy-Dencső	Ágnes Szentannai		Budapest, Hungary
Tomoko Takeda	Miyuki Baba	Natsuko Ishiyama	Kana Ogawa		Sapporo, Japan
Taylore Theroux	Jesse Iles	Holly Jamieson	Kataryna Hagglund		Edmonton, Alberta
Jill Thurston	Brette Richards	Brandi Oliver	Blaine de Jager		Winnipeg, Manitoba
Brandi Tinkler	Ashley Nordin	Lauren Legan	Nicky Block	Heather Beatty	Victoria, British Columbia
Silvana Tirinzoni	Marlene Albrecht	Esther Neuenschwander	Manuela Siegrist		Aarau, Switzerland
Susan Tschirhart	Marnie Loeb	Shana McEachren	Debbie O'Reilly		Toronto, Ontario
Kai Tsuchiya	Misaki Kobayashi	Kie Igarashi	Mina Uchibori	Erika Otanii	Miyota, Japan
Terry Ursel	Wanda Rainka	Darla Hanke	Lisa Davie	Kendell Kohinski	Arden, Manitoba
Kalia Van Osch	Marika Van Osch	Sarah Daniels	Ashley Sandersoni		Victoria, British Columbia
Kesa Van Osch	Steph Jackson	Jessie Sanderson	Carley Sandwith		Victoria, British Columbia
Rhonda Varnes	Kalie McKenna	Celeste Butler-Rohland	Breanne Merklinger		Ottawa, Ontario
Lorna Vevers	Sarah Reid	Rebecca Kesley	Rachel Hannen		Stirling, Scotland
Lana Vey	Alexandra Williamson	Natalie Bloomfield	Ashley Williamson		Regina, Saskatchewan
Ellen Vogt	Maija Salmiovirta	Riikka Louhivuori	Laura Kitti	Paula Lehtomäki	Helsinki, Finland
Wang Bingyu	Liu Yin	Yue Qingshuang	Zhou Yan		Harbin, China
Kimberly Wapola	Brigid Knowles	Jennifer Westhagen	Courtney Shaw		St. Paul, Minnesota
Sarah Wark	Michelle Allen	Simone Brosseau	Rachelle Kallechy		Victoria, British Columbia
Ashley Waye	Mallory Buist	Denise Donovan	Angela Cerantoala		Toronto, Ontario
Crystal Webster	Cathy Overton-Clapham	Geri-Lynn Ramsay	Samantha Preston		Calgary, Alberta
Holly Whyte	Heather Steele	Michelle Dykstra	Amber Cheveldave	Deena Benoit	Grande Prairie, Alberta
Kelly Wood	Teejay Haichert	Janelle Tyler	Kelsey Dutton		Swift Current, Saskatchewan
Isabella Wranå	Jennie Wåhlin	Elin Lövstrand	Fanny Sjöberg		Sundbyberg, Sweden
Sayaka Yoshimura	Rina Ida	Risa Ujihara	Mao Ishigaki		Sapporo, Japan
Veronica Zappone	Sara Levetti	Elisa Patono	Arianna Losano	Martina Bronsinoi	, Italy
Olga Zharkova	Julia Portunova	Alisa Tregub	Julia Guzieva	Oksana Gertova	Kaliningrad, Russia
