= 2013 Kamloops Crown of Curling =

World Curling Tour event

- Host city: Kamloops, British Columbia
- Arena: Kamloops Curling Club
- Dates: October 18–21
- Men's winner: (British Columbia) Grant Dezura
- Skip: Grant Dezura
- Fourth: Kevin MacKenzie
- Second: Jamie Smith
- Lead: Kevin Recksiedler
- Finalist: (British Columbia) Dean Joanisse
- Women's winner: (Minnesota) Allison Pottinger
- Curling club: Bemidji CC, Bemidji
- Skip: Allison Pottinger
- Third: Nicole Joraanstad
- Second: Natalie Nicholson
- Lead: Tabitha Peterson
- Finalist: (Japan) Ayumi Ogasawara

The 2013 Kamloops Crown of Curling was held from October 18 to 21 at the Kamloops Curling Club in Kamloops, British Columbia as part of the 2013–14 World Curling Tour. The men's event was held in a round robin format, while the women's event was held in a triple-knockout format. The purse for the men's event was CAD$32,000, of which the winner, Grant Dezura, received CAD$8,000, and the purse for the women's event was CAD$34,000, of which the winner, Allison Pottinger, received CAD$8,000. Dezura defeated Dean Joanisse in the men's final with a score of 5–4, while Pottinger defeated Ayumi Ogasawara of Japan in the final with a score of 3–2.

== Men ==
=== Teams ===
The teams are listed as follows:

Skip	Third	Second	Lead	Locale
Chris Baier	Josh Hozack	Corey Chester	Andrew Komlodi	Victoria, British Columbia
Steve Birkild	Chris Bond	Matt Birkild	Atticus Wallace	(Washington (state)) Seattle, Washington
Brady Clark	Sean Beighton	Darren Lehto	Phil Tilker	(Washington (state)) Lynnwood, Washington
Neil Dangerfield	Dennis Sutton	Darren Boden	Glen Allen	Victoria, British Columbia
Kevin MacKenzie (fourth)	Grant Dezura (skip)	Jamie Smith	Kevin Recksiedler	Kelowna, British Columbia
Sam Galey	Andrew Ernst	Mac Guy	Jeremy Dinsel	(Washington (state)) Seattle, Washington
Michael Johnson (fourth)	Dean Joanisse (skip)	Paul Cseke	John Cullen	New Westminster, British Columbia
Mark Johnson	Kurt Balderston	Rob Bucholz	Del Shaughnessy	Edmonton, Alberta
Kim Chang-min	Kim Min-chan	Seong Se-hyeon	Seo Young-seon	Uiseong, South Korea
Ken McArdle	Dylan Somerton	Chase Martyn	Michael Horita	Port Coquitlam, British Columbia
Darren Nelson				Kamloops, British Columbia
Grant Olsen				Kamloops, British Columbia
Trevor Perepolkin	Deane Horning	Tyler Orme	Chris Anderson	Vernon, British Columbia
Sanjay Bowry (fourth)	Nolan Reid (skip)	Calvin Heels	Byron Heels	Victoria, British Columbia
Jeff Richard	Tom Shypitka	Jay Wakefield	David Harper	Kelowna, British Columbia
Randie Shen	Brendon Liu	Nicolas Hsu	Justin Hsu	Taipei, Chinese Taipei
Brad Thompson				Kamloops, British Columbia
Brent Yamada	Corey Sauer	Tyler Klymchuk	Lance Yamada	Kamloops, British Columbia

=== Round-robin standings ===
Final round-robin standings

Key
Teams to Playoffs

Pool A	W	L
(Alberta) Mark Johnson	5	0
(Washington (state)) Brady Clark	4	1
(British Columbia) Chris Baier	3	2
(British Columbia) Ken McArdle	2	3
(British Columbia) Darren Nelson	1	4
(Washington (state)) Sam Galey	0	5

Pool B	W	L
(British Columbia) Grant Dezura	4	1
(British Columbia) Dean Joanisse	4	1
(British Columbia) Neil Dangerfield	3	2
(British Columbia) Brent Yamada	2	3
(Washington (state)) Steve Birkild	1	4
(British Columbia) Nolan Reid	1	4

Pool C	W	L
(British Columbia) Jeff Richard	5	0
(British Columbia) Trevor Perepolkin	4	1
(South Korea) Kim Chang-min	3	2
(Chinese Taipei) Randie Shen	2	3
(British Columbia) Grant Olsen	1	4
(British Columbia) Brad Thompson	0	5

=== Playoffs ===
Quarterfinals
(British Columbia) Trevor Perepolkin	2
(British Columbia) Grant Dezura	6
(British Columbia) Dean Joanisse	6
(Washington (state)) Brady Clark	4

Semifinals
(Alberta) Mark Johnson	5
(British Columbia) Grant Dezura	7
(British Columbia) Jeff Richard	4
(British Columbia) Dean Joanisse	6

Final
(British Columbia) Grant Dezura	5
(British Columbia) Dean Joanisse	4

== Women ==
=== Teams ===
The teams are listed as follows:

Skip	Third	Second	Lead	Locale
Corryn Brown	Erin Pincott	Samantha Fisher	Sydney Fraser	Kamloops, British Columbia
Kirsten Fox	Kristen Recksiedler	Trysta Vandale	Lorelle Weiss	New Westminster, British Columbia
Colleen Hannah	Simone Groundwater	Laura Ball	Cynthia Parton	Maple Ridge, British Columbia
Jiang Yilun	Wang Rui	Yao Mingyue	She Qiutong	Harbin, China
Tracey Jones	Falon Burkitt	Kay Lynn Thompson	Melinda Kotsch	Prince George, British Columbia
Kim Ji-sun	Gim Un-chi	Shin Mi-sung	Lee Seul-bee	Gyeongbuk, South Korea
Patti Knezevic	Jen Rusnell	Kristen Fewster	Rhonda Camozzi	Prince George, British Columbia
Sarah Koltun	Chelsea Duncan	Patty Wallingham	Andrea Sinclair	Whitehorse, Yukon
Roberta Kuhn	Karla Thompson	Brooklyn Leitch	Michelle Ramsay	Kamloops, British Columbia
Allison MacInnes	Grace MacInnes	Diane Gushulak	Amanda Tipper	Kamloops, British Columbia
Marla Mallett	Kelly Shimizu	Adina Tasaka	Shannon Ward	Cloverdale, British Columbia
Jody Maskiewich	Jenn Howard	Stephanie Prinse	Katye Gyles	New Westminster, British Columbia
Kristie Moore	Sarah Wilkes	Ashleigh Clark	Kyla MacLachlan	Sexsmith, Alberta
Lene Nielsen	Helle Simonsen	Jeanne Ellegaard	Maria Poulsen	Hvidovre, Denmark
Ayumi Ogasawara	Yumie Funayama	Kaho Onodera	Chinami Yoshida	Sapporo, Japan
Cissi Östlund	Sabina Kraupp	Sara Carlsson	Paulina Stein	Karlstad, Sweden
Allison Pottinger	Nicole Joraanstad	Natalie Nicholson	Tabitha Peterson	Bemidji, Minnesota
Marilou Richter	Sandra Comadina	Jami McMartin	Jennifer Allen	New Westminster, British Columbia
Brandi Tinkler	Ashley Nordin	Lauren Legan	Nicky Block	Victoria, British Columbia
Silvana Tirinzoni	Marlene Albrecht	Esther Neuenschwander	Manuela Siegrist	Aarau, Switzerland
Kalia Van Osch	Marika Van Osch	Sarah Daniels	Ashley Sandersoni	Victoria, British Columbia
Kesa Van Osch	Steph Jackson	Jessie Sanderson	Carley Sandwith	Victoria, British Columbia

=== Knockout results ===
==== A event ====
First Knockout		Semifinals		Qualifier 1
		(Switzerland) Silvana Tirinzoni	6
(British Columbia) Marla Mallett	6	(British Columbia) Marla Mallett	2
(British Columbia) Roberta Kuhn	3			(Switzerland) Silvana Tirinzoni	9
(China) Jiang Yilun	3			(South Korea) Kim Ji-sun	1
(British Columbia) Tracey Jones	9	(British Columbia) Tracey Jones	5
(British Columbia) Kirsten Fox	2	(South Korea) Kim Ji-sun	6
(South Korea) Kim Ji-sun	7

First Knockout		Semifinals		Qualifier 2
(Sweden) Cissi Östlund	11
(British Columbia) Colleen Hannah	5	(Sweden) Cissi Östlund	5
(British Columbia) Kalia Van Osch	4	(British Columbia) Patti Knezevic	4
(British Columbia) Patti Knezevic	9			(Sweden) Cissi Östlund	1
(British Columbia) Corryn Brown	4			(Minnesota) Allison Pottinger	6
(British Columbia) Kesa Van Osch	5	(British Columbia) Kesa Van Osch	5
(Minnesota) Allison Pottinger	7	(Minnesota) Allison Pottinger	6
(British Columbia) Jody Maskiewich	5

First Knockout		Semifinals		Qualifier 3
(Alberta) Kristie Moore	8
(British Columbia) Brandi Tinkler	6	(Alberta) Kristie Moore	5
(British Columbia) Allison MacInnes	7	(British Columbia) Allison MacInnes	8
(Yukon) Sarah Koltun	3			(British Columbia) Allison MacInnes	7
(British Columbia) Marilou Richter	2			(Japan) Ayumi Ogasawara	6
(Japan) Ayumi Ogasawara	10	(Japan) Ayumi Ogasawara	7
		(Denmark) Lene Nielsen	6

==== B event ====
Second Knockout
(China) Jiang Yilun	7
(British Columbia) Kirsten Fox	6

Quarterfinals
(Alberta) Kristie Moore	5
(British Columbia) Roberta Kuhn	1
(Denmark) Lene Nielsen	7
(China) Jiang Yilun	3

Semifinals
(Alberta) Kristie Moore	4
(Denmark) Lene Nielsen	2

Qualifier 4
(Alberta) Kristie Moore	3
(Sweden) Cissi Östlund	7

Second Knockout
(British Columbia) Colleen Hannah	1
(British Columbia) Kalia Van Osch	8
(British Columbia) Corryn Brown	5
(British Columbia) Jody Maskiewich	4

Quarterfinals
(British Columbia) Marla Mallett	5
(British Columbia) Kalia Van Osch	4
(British Columbia) Tracey Jones	2
(British Columbia) Corryn Brown	9

Semifinals
(British Columbia) Marla Mallett	7
(British Columbia) Corryn Brown	8

Qualifier 5
(British Columbia) Corryn Brown	3
(Japan) Ayumi Ogasawara	8

Second Knockout
(British Columbia) Brandi Tinkler	2
(Yukon) Sarah Koltun	7

Quarterfinals
(British Columbia) Patti Knezevic	6
(Yukon) Sarah Koltun	5
(British Columbia) Kesa Van Osch	6
(British Columbia) Marilou Richter	5

Semifinals
(British Columbia) Patti Knezevic	6
(British Columbia) Kesa Van Osch	7

Qualifier 6
(British Columbia) Kesa Van Osch	1
(South Korea) Kim Ji-sun	7

==== C event ====
Third Knockout
(British Columbia) Kalia Van Osch	1
(British Columbia) Tracey Jones	10
(Yukon) Sarah Koltun	2
(British Columbia) Marilou Richter	7

Quarterfinals
(British Columbia) Roberta Kuhn	5
(China) Jiang Yilun	8
(British Columbia) Tracey Jones	3
(British Columbia) Patti Knezevic	6
(Denmark) Lene Nielsen	10
(British Columbia) Marilou Richter	5

Semifinals
(China) Jiang Yilun	6
(British Columbia) Patti Knezevic	4
(Denmark) Lene Nielsen	0
(British Columbia) Corryn Brown	7

Qualifier 7
(China) Jiang Yilun	7
(British Columbia) Corryn Brown	3

Third Knockout
(British Columbia) Colleen Hannah	2
(British Columbia) Jody Maskiewich	3

Quarterfinals
(British Columbia) Kirsten Fox	5
(British Columbia) Marla Mallett	6
(British Columbia) Jody Maskiewich	4
(British Columbia) Brandi Tinkler	5

Semifinals
(British Columbia) Kesa Van Osch	3
(British Columbia) Marla Mallett	7
(Alberta) Kristie Moore	6
(British Columbia) Brandi Tinkler	2

Qualifier 8
(British Columbia) Marla Mallett	4
(Alberta) Kristie Moore	2

=== Playoffs ===
Quarterfinals
(Switzerland) Silvana Tirinzoni	7
(British Columbia) Marla Mallett	3
(British Columbia) Allison MacInnes	5
(Japan) Ayumi Ogasawara	6
(Minnesota) Allison Pottinger	9
(China) Jiang Yilun	6
(Sweden) Cissi Östlund	5
(South Korea) Kim Ji-sun	6

Semifinals
(Switzerland) Silvana Tirinzoni	5
(Japan) Ayumi Ogasawara	8
(Minnesota) Allison Pottinger	6
(South Korea) Kim Ji-sun	5

Final
(Japan) Ayumi Ogasawara	2
(Minnesota) Allison Pottinger	3
