= 2013 Avonair Cash Spiel =

- Host city: Edmonton, Alberta
- Arena: Avonair Curling Club
- Dates: October 4–6
- Men's winner: (Alberta) Ted Appelman
- Skip: Ted Appelman
- Third: Shawn Donnelly
- Second: Landon Bucholz
- Lead: Bryce Bucholz
- Finalist: (Alberta) Shane Park
- Women's winner: (Alberta) Jessie Kaufman
- Curling club: Spruce Grove CC, Spruce Grove
- Skip: Jessie Kaufman
- Third: Tiffany Steuber
- Second: Dayna Demmans
- Lead: Stephanie Enright
- Finalist: (Alberta) Holly Whyte

The 2013 Avonair Cash Spiel was held from October 4 to 6 at the Avonair Curling Club in Edmonton, Alberta as part of the 2013–14 World Curling Tour.

== Men ==
=== Teams ===
The teams are listed as follows:

Skip	Third	Second	Lead	Locale
Ted Appelman	Shawn Donnelly	Landon Bucholz	Bryce Bucholz	Edmonton, Alberta
Josh Burns	Kris Sutton	Shane Parcels	Travis Jones	Edmonton, Alberta
Warren Cross	Dean Darwent	Dwight Alfrey	Doug McNish	Edmonton, Alberta
Kevin MacKenzie (fourth)	Grant Dezura (skip)	Jamie Smith	Kevin Recksiedler	Kelowna, British Columbia
Dale Fellows	Peter Lee	Bob Irwin	Lyle Biever	Spruce Grove, Alberta
Curtis Harrish	Brian Kushinski	Tyler Wasieczko	Dan Munro	Calgary, Alberta
Lloyd Hill	Scott Egger	Greg Hill	Maurice Sonier	Calgary, Alberta
Mark Johnson	Kurt Balderston	Rob Bucholz	Del Shaughnessy	Edmonton, Alberta
Rob Maksymetz	Evan Asmussen	Sean Morris		Grande Prairie, Alberta
Dean Mamer	Vance Elder	Jason Stannard	Wallace Hollingshead	Calgary, Alberta
Shane Park	Tony Germsheid	Aaron Sarafinchan	Phil Hemming	Edmonton, Alberta
Tom Sallows	Jordan Steinke	Matthew Brown	Kendell Warawa	Edmonton, Alberta
Thomas Scoffin	Dylan Gousseau	Jaques Bellamy	Andrew O'Dell	Edmonton, Alberta
Dave Stewart	Greg Keith	Jeff Smith	Martin Pederson	Spruce Grove, Alberta
Charley Thomas	Colin Hodgson	Matthew Ng	Mike Westlund	Calgary, Alberta
Daylan Vavrek	Jason Ginter	Tristan Steinke	Brett Winfield	Dawson Creek, British Columbia
Wang Fengchun	Jiang Dongxu	Chen Han	Wang Zhiqiang	Harbin, China
Scott Webb	Ryan Konowalyk	Steve Byrne	Jesse Sopko	Peace River, Alberta
Wade White	Kevin Tym	Dan Holowaychuk	George White	Edmonton, Alberta
Zou Dejia	Bai Yang	Wang Jinbo	Zhang Rongrui	Harbin, China

=== Round-robin standings ===
Final round-robin standings

Key
Teams to Playoffs

Pool A	W	L
(British Columbia) Daylan Vavrek	3	0
(British Columbia) Grant Dezura	2	1
(Alberta) Dave Stewart	1	2
(Alberta) Josh Burns	0	3

Pool B	W	L
(Alberta) Shane Park	3	0
(Alberta) Dale Fellows	2	1
(Alberta) Wade White	1	2
(Alberta) Warren Cross	0	3

Pool C	W	L
(Alberta) Lloyd Hill	2	1
(Alberta) Thomas Scoffin	2	1
(Alberta) Charley Thomas	1	2
(Alberta) Scott Webb	1	2

Pool D	W	L
(Alberta) Dean Mamer	2	1
(China) Wang Fengchun	2	1
(China) Zou Dejia	2	1
(Alberta) Tom Sallows	0	3

Pool E	W	L
(Alberta) Ted Appelman	3	0
(Alberta) Mark Johnson	2	1
(Alberta) Rob Maksymetz	1	2
(Alberta) Curtis Harrish	0	3

=== Playoffs ===
Quarterfinals
(Alberta) Ted Appelman	7
(Alberta) Dale Fellows	1
(Alberta) Dean Mamer	4
(Alberta) Lloyd Hill	6
(Alberta) Shane Park	7
(China) Wang Fengchun	4
(British Columbia) Daylan Vavrek	5
(Alberta) Thomas Scoffin	6

Semifinals
(Alberta) Ted Appelman	5
(Alberta) Lloyd Hill	2
(Alberta) Shane Park	6
(Alberta) Thomas Scoffin	0

Final
(Alberta) Ted Appelman	5
(Alberta) Shane Park	1

== Women ==
=== Teams ===
The teams are listed as follows:

Skip	Third	Second	Lead	Locale
Brett Barber	Samantha Yachiw	Meaghan Freirichs		Biggar, Saskatchewan
Delia DeJong	Amy Janko	Brittany Whittemore	Stephanie Yanishewski	Grande Prairie, Alberta
Janais DeJong	Karli Makichuk	Kaitlyn Sherrer	Lindsay Janko	Grande Prairie, Alberta
Kelly Erickson	Lindsay Makichuk	Kristina Hadden	Alison Kotylak	Edmonton, Alberta
Jiang Yilun	Wang Rui	Yao Mingyue	She Qiutong	Harbin, China
Lisa Johnson	Michelle Kryzalka	Natalie Holloway	Shauna Nordstrom	Spruce Grove, Alberta
Jessie Kaufman	Tiffany Steuber	Dayna Demmans	Stephanie Enright	Spruce Grove, Alberta
Nicky Kaufman	Pam Appelman	Brittany Zelmer	Jennifer Sheehan	Edmonton, Alberta
Chana Martineau	Candace Reid	Kara Lindholm	Kandace Lindholm	Edmonton, Alberta
Mari Motohashi	Yurika Yoshida	Yumi Suzuki	Megumi Mabuchi	Kitami, Japan
Kelsey Rocque	Keely Brown	Taylor McDonald	Claire Tully	Edmonton, Alberta
Leslie Rogers	Kathleen Dunbar	Jenilee Goertzen	Kelsey Latawiec	Edmonton, Alberta
Bobbie Sauder	Heather Kushnir	Lisa Miller	Joelle Trawick	Edmonton, Alberta
Danielle Schmiemann	Kate Goodhelpsen	Brenna Bilassy	Rebecca Allen	Edmonton, Alberta
Kaitlin Stubbs	Vanessa McConnell	Valerie Hamende	Alice MacKay	Calgary, Alberta
Karallee Swabb	Brenda Doroshuk	Cindy Talaga	Melanie Swabb	Edmonton, Alberta
Tomoko Takeda	Miyuki Baba	Natsuko Ishiyama	Kana Ogawa	Sapporo, Japan
Taylore Theroux	Jesse Iles	Holly Jamieson	Kataryna Hagglund	Edmonton, Alberta
Holly Whyte	Heather Steele	Michelle Dykstra	Amber Cheveldave	Grande Prairie, Alberta
Sayaka Yoshimura	Rina Ida	Risa Ujihara	Mao Ishigaki	Sapporo, Japan

=== Round-robin standings ===
Final round-robin standings

Key
Teams to Playoffs

Pool A	W	L
(China) Jiang Yilun	3	0
(Alberta) Janais DeJong	1	2
(Japan) Mari Motohashi	1	2
(Alberta) Leslie Rogers	1	2

Pool B	W	L
(Alberta) Lisa Johnson	3	0
(Alberta) Kelsey Rocque	2	1
(Alberta) Kaitlin Stubbs	1	2
(Alberta) Danielle Schmiemann	0	3

Pool C	W	L
(Alberta) Jessie Kaufman	3	0
(Japan) Tomoko Takeda	2	1
(Alberta) Kelly Erickson	1	2
(Alberta) Chana Martineau	0	3

Pool D	W	L
(Alberta) Delia DeJong	2	1
(Alberta) Bobbie Sauder	2	1
(Alberta) Holly Whyte	2	1
(Alberta) Karallee Swabb	0	3

Pool E	W	L
(Saskatchewan) Brett Barber	2	1
(Alberta) Nicky Kaufman	2	1
(Alberta) Taylore Theroux	1	2
(Japan) Sayaka Yoshimura	1	2

=== Playoffs ===
Quarterfinals
(China) Jiang Yilun	1
(Alberta) Holly Whyte	8
(Saskatchewan) Brett Barber	12
(Alberta) Delia DeJong	1
(Alberta) Jessie Kaufman	7
(Alberta) Bobbie Sauder	3
(Alberta) Lisa Johnson	5
(Alberta) Nicky Kaufman	3

Semifinals
(Alberta) Holly Whyte	8
(Saskatchewan) Brett Barber	3
(Alberta) Jessie Kaufman	6
(Alberta) Lisa Johnson	2

Final
(Alberta) Holly Whyte	2
(Alberta) Jessie Kaufman	5
