= 2013 Cloverdale Cash Spiel =

World Curling Tour event

- Host city: Surrey, British Columbia
- Arena: Cloverdale Curling Club
- Dates: September 20–22
- Men's winner: (British Columbia) Dean Joanisse
- Skip: Dean Joanisse
- Fourth: Michael Johnson
- Second: Paul Cseke
- Lead: John Cullen
- Finalist: (British Columbia) Ken McArdle
- Women's winner: (British Columbia) Patti Knezevic
- Skip: Patti Knezevic
- Third: Jen Rusnell
- Second: Kristen Fewster
- Lead: Rhonda Camozzi
- Finalist: (British Columbia) Kalia Van Osch

The 2013 Cloverdale Cash Spiel was held from September 20 to 22 at the Cloverdale Curling Club in Surrey, British Columbia as part of the 2013–14 World Curling Tour. Both the men's and women's events were held in a round robin format, and the purses for the men's and women's events were CAD$8,050 each.

== Men ==
=== Teams ===
The teams are listed as follows:

Skip	Third	Second	Lead	Locale
Chris Baier	Josh Hozack	Corey Chester	Andrew Komlodi	Victoria, British Columbia
Andrew Bilesky	Stephen Kopf	Derek Errington	Aaron Watson	New Westminster, British Columbia
Richard Brower	Chris Faa	Jan Bos	Deryk Brower	Vancouver, British Columbia
Brady Clark	Sean Beighton	Darren Lehto	Phil Tilker	(Washington (state)) Lynnwood, Washington
Michael Johnson (fourth)	Dean Joanisse (skip)	Paul Cseke	John Cullen	New Westminster, British Columbia
Kevin MacKenzie	Grant Dezura	Jamie Smith	Kevin Recksiedler	Kelowna, British Columbia
Ken McArdle	Dylan Somerton	Chase Martyn	Michael Horita	Port Coquitlam, British Columbia
Sven Michel	Claudio Pätz	Sandro Trolliet	Simon Gempeler	Adelboden, Switzerland
Pete Nielsen	Evan Branter	Kyle Duncan	David MacDonald	Vancouver, British Columbia
Sean Geall (fourth)	Brent Pierce (skip)	Sebastien Robillard	Mark Olson	New Westminster, British Columbia
Sanjay Bowry (fourth)	Nolan Reid (skip)	Calvin Heels	Byron Heels	Victoria, British Columbia
Randie Shen	Brendon Liu	Nicolas Hsu	Justin Hsu	Taipei, Chinese Taipei
Mel Steffin	Steve Wright	Brett Kury	John Homenuke	Surrey, British Columbia
Tyler Tardi	Jordan Tardi	Nicholas Meister	Zachary Umbach	Langley, British Columbia
Jake Vukich	Evan McAuley	Luc Violette	Kyle Lorvick	(Washington (state)) Seattle, Washington

=== Round-robin standings ===
Final round-robin standings

Key
Teams to Playoffs

Pool A	W	L
(British Columbia) Brent Pierce	4	0
(British Columbia) Ken McArdle	3	1
(British Columbia) Chris Baier	2	2
(British Columbia) Richard Brower	1	3
(Chinese Taipei) Randie Shen	0	4

Pool B	W	L
(British Columbia) Mel Steffin	3	1
(Washington (state)) Brady Clark	2	2
(Switzerland) Sven Michel	2	2
(British Columbia) Nolan Reid	2	2
(British Columbia) Tyler Tardi	0	4

Pool C	W	L
(British Columbia) Dean Joanisse	4	0
(British Columbia) Kevin MacKenzie	3	1
(British Columbia) Andrew Bilesky	2	2
(Washington (state)) Jake Vukich	1	3
(British Columbia) Peter Nielsen	0	4

=== Playoffs ===
Quarterfinals
(British Columbia) Mel Steffin	3
(British Columbia) Ken McArdle	7
(British Columbia) Kevin MacKenzie	7
(Washington (state)) Brady Clark	3

Semifinals
(British Columbia) Brent Pierce	4
(British Columbia) Ken McArdle	5
(British Columbia) Dean Joanisse	8
(British Columbia) Kevin MacKenzie	7

Final
(British Columbia) Ken McArdle	4
(British Columbia) Dean Joanisse	7

== Women ==
=== Teams ===
The teams are listed as follows:

Skip	Third	Second	Lead	Locale
Corryn Brown	Erin Pincott	Samantha Fisher	Sydney Fraser	Kamloops, British Columbia
Rebecca Turley (fourth)	Amy Gibson (skip)	Carman Cheng	Michelle Dunn	Vancouver, British Columbia
Shawna Jensen	Tatianna Simicic	Merit Thorson	Jade Shultis	Delta, British Columbia
Tracey Jones	Falon Burkitt	Kay Lynn Thompson	Melinda Kotsch	Prince George, British Columbia
Patti Knezevic	Jen Rusnell	Kristen Fewster	Rhonda Camozzi	Prince George, British Columbia
Roberta Kuhn	Karla Thompson	Brooklyn Leitch	Michelle Ramsay	Kamloops, British Columbia
Kelley Law	Kirsten Fox	Kristen Recksiedler	Trysta Vandale	New Westminster, British Columbia
Allison MacInnes	Grace MacInnes	Diane Gushulak	Amanda Tipper	Kamloops, British Columbia
Marla Mallett	Kelly Shimizu	Adina Tasaka	Shannon Ward	Cloverdale, British Columbia
Jody Maskiewich	Jenn Howard	Stephanie Prinse	Katye Gyles	New Westminster, British Columbia
Marilou Richter	Sandra Comadina	Jami McMartin	Jennifer Allen	New Westminster, British Columbia
Brenda Ridgeway	Leslie Shearer	Susan Chepil	Louise Russel	Nanaimo, British Columbia
Brandi Tinkler				Victoria, British Columbia
Kalia Van Osch	Marika Van Osch	Sarah Daniels	Ashley Sandersoni	Victoria, British Columbia
Kesa Van Osch	Steph Jackson	Jessie Sanderson	Carley Sandwith	Victoria, British Columbia

=== Round-robin standings ===
Final round-robin standings

Key
Teams to Playoffs

Pool A	W	L
(British Columbia) Kalia Van Osch	4	0
(British Columbia) Patti Knezevic	2	2
(British Columbia) Roberta Kuhn	2	2
(British Columbia) Marilou Richter	2	2
(British Columbia) Shawna Jensen	0	4

Pool B	W	L
(British Columbia) Kesa Van Osch	3	1
(British Columbia) Tracey Jones	2	2
(British Columbia) Marla Mallett	2	2
(British Columbia) Corryn Brown	2	2
(British Columbia) Brenda Ridgeway	1	3

Pool C	W	L
(British Columbia) Allison MacInnes	3	1
(British Columbia) Amy Gibson	3	1
(British Columbia) Kelley Law	2	2
(British Columbia) Brandi Tinkler	2	2
(British Columbia) Jody Maskiewich	0	4

=== Playoffs ===
Quarterfinals
(British Columbia) Allison MacInnes	5
(British Columbia) Tracey Jones	4
(British Columbia) Kesa Van Osch	4
(British Columbia) Patti Knezevic	7

Semifinals
(British Columbia) Kalia Van Osch	8
(British Columbia) Allison MacInnes	2
(British Columbia) Amy Gibson	2
(British Columbia) Patti Knezevic	7

Final
(British Columbia) Kalia Van Osch	3
(British Columbia) Patti Knezevic	5
