= 2011 Cloverdale Cash Spiel =

World Curling Tour event

- Host city: Surrey, British Columbia
- Arena: Cloverdale Curling Club
- Dates: September 15–18
- Men's winner: (Russia) Alexey Tselousov
- Curling club: Moscow, Russia
- Skip: Alexey Tselousov
- Third: Andrey Drozdov
- Second: Alexey Stukalsky
- Lead: Aleksey Kamnev
- Finalist: (British Columbia) Brent Pierce
- Women's winner: (British Columbia) Kelley Law
- Curling club: New Westminster, British Columbia
- Skip: Kelley Law
- Third: Shannon Aleksic
- Second: Kirsten Fox
- Lead: Dawn Suliak
- Finalist: (Russia) Liudmila Privivkova

The 2011 Cloverdale Cash Spiel was an annual curling bonspiel that was held from September 15 to 18 at the Cloverdale Curling Club in Surrey, British Columbia as part of the 2011–12 World Curling Tour. The purse for the men's and women's events was CAD$8,050 for both events.

== Men ==
=== Teams ===
Skip	Third	Second	Lead	Locale
Sean Beighton	Andrew Ernst	Sam Galey	Mac Guy	(Washington (state)) Seattle, Washington
Andrew Bilesky	Stephen Kopf	Derek Errington	Aaron Watson	New Westminster, British Columbia
Wes Craig	Greg Hawkes	William Sutton	Stu Merrifield	Victoria, British Columbia
Chris Girling	Chris Faa	Mike Merklinger	Sean Ramsay	Kelowna, British Columbia
Josh Hozack	Corey Chester	Nolan Reid	Zac Capron	Victoria, British Columbia
Wes Johnson	Brady Clark	Darren Lehto	Steve Lundeen	(Washington (state)) Seattle, Washington
Bryan Kedziora	Ron Leech	Mike Goerz	Dwayne Uyede	Maple Ridge, British Columbia
Tyler Klymchuk	Dylan Somerton	Michael Horitz	Rhys Gamache	British Columbia
Dean Joanisse (fourth)	Tyler Klitch	Bryan Miki (skip)	Jay Batch	New Westminster, British Columbia
Jeff Richard (fourth)	Brent Pierce (skip)	Kevin Recksiedler	Grant Dezura	New Westminster, British Columbia
Randie Shen	Brendon Liu	Nicolas Hsu	Jan-Quinn Yu	Taipei City, Chinese Taipei
Mel Steffin	Barry Breton	Richard Brower	Gary Smith	British Columbia
Alexey Tselousov	Andrey Drozdov	Alexey Stukalsky	Aleksey Kamnev	Moscow, Russia
Michael Johnson (fourth)	Chris Baier	Jay Wakefield (skip)	John Cullen	New Westminster, British Columbia
Daniel Wenzek	Cameron de Jong	Sanjay Bowry	Thomas Theirbach	British Columbia

=== Round Robin Standings ===
Block D	W	L
(British Columbia) Brent Pierce	4	1
(Russia) Alexey Tselousov	2	2
(British Columbia) Josh Hozack	2	2
(British Columbia) Bryan Kedizora	2	2
(British Columbia) Mel Steffin	1	4

Block E	W	L
(British Columbia) Andrew Bilesky	3	1
(British Columbia) Bryan Miki	2	2
(Washington (state)) Wes Johnson	2	2
(British Columbia) Tyler Klymchuk	2	2
(British Columbia) Jay Wakefield	1	3

Block F	W	L
(British Columbia) Wes Craig	4	0
(Chinese Taipei) Randie Shen	3	1
(Washington (state)) Sean Beighton	2	2
(British Columbia) Chris Girling	0	3
(British Columbia) Daniel Wenzek	0	3

=== Playoffs ===
Quarterfinals
(Chinese Taipei) Randie Shen	3
(British Columbia) Bryan Miki	10
(British Columbia) Andrew Bilesky	3
(Russia) Alexey Tselousov	4

Semifinals
(British Columbia) Brent Pierce	6
(British Columbia) Bryan Miki	4
(British Columbia) Wes Craig	4
(Russia) Alexey Tselousov	5

Final
(British Columbia) Brent Pierce	2
(Russia) Alexey Tselousov	5

== Women ==
=== Teams ===
Skip	Third	Second	Lead	Locale
LeAnne Andrews	Donna Langlands	Andrea Smith	Victoria Murphy	British Columbia
Nicole Backe	Rachelle Kallechy	Lindsae Page	Kelsi Jones	Vancouver, British Columbia
Falcon Burkitt	Jesse Sanderson	Ashley Sanderson	Sydney Gustafson	British Columbia
Cristin Clark	Emily Good	Elle LeBeau	Sharon Vukich	(Washington (state)) Seattle, Washington
Sarah Wark (fourth)	Michelle Allen	Roselyn Craig (skip)	Megan Reid	Duncan, British Columbia
Simone Groundwater	Laura Ball	Mallory Geier	Marla Guldbranson	British Columbia
Shelly Houle	Jackie Peat	Rebecca Turley	Michelle Dunn	British Columbia
Kelley Law	Shannon Aleksic	Kirsten Fox	Dawn Suliak	New Westminster, British Columbia
Kristy Lewis	Marilou Richter	Michelle Ramsay	Sandra Comadina	Vancouver, British Columbia
Marla Mallett	Darah Provencal	Steph Jackson	Kelly Shimizu	New Westminster, British Columbia
Liudmila Privivkova	Anna Sidorova	Nkeiruka Ezekh	Ekaterina Galkina	Moscow, Russia
Stephanie Prinse	Dana Page	Ali Renwick	Amanda Tipper	British Columbia
Brandi Tinkler	Marilou Richter	Michelle Ramsay	TBD	Victoria, British Columbia
Kesa Van Osch	Kalia Van Osch	Brooklyn Leitch	Marika Van Osch	Victoria, British Columbia
Olga Zyablikova	Ekaterina Antonova	Victorya Moiseeva	Galina Arsenkina	Moscow, Russia

=== Round Robin Standings ===
Block A	W	L
(Russia) Liudmila Privivkova	4	0
(British Columbia) Falcon Burkitt	3	1
(British Columbia) Shelly Houle	2	2
(British Columbia) Marla Mallett	1	3
(British Columbia) Stephanie Prinse	0	4

Block B	W	L
(British Columbia) Nicole Backe	3	1
(British Columbia) Kristy Lewis	3	1
(British Columbia) Roselyn Craig	3	1
(Russia) Olga Zyablikova	1	3
(British Columbia) LeAnne Andrews	0	4

Block C	W	L
(British Columbia) Kelley Law	4	0
(British Columbia) Kesa Van Osch	3	1
(Washington (state)) Cristin Clark	1	3
(British Columbia) Simone Groundwater	1	3
(British Columbia) Brandi Tinkler	1	3

=== Playoffs ===
Quarterfinals
(British Columbia) Kristy Lewis	7
(British Columbia) Falcon Burkitt	3
(British Columbia) Nicole Backe	5
(British Columbia) Kesa Van Osch	6

Semifinals
(British Columbia) Kelley Law	5
(British Columbia) Kristy Lewis	3
(Russia) Liudmila Privivkova	4
(British Columbia) Kesa Van Osch	2

Final
(British Columbia) Kelley Law	5
(Russia) Liudmila Privivkova	4
