= 2013–14 curling season =

- Sport: Curling

Seasons
- ← 2012–13 2014–15 →

The 2013–14 curling season began in August 2013 and ended in May 2014.

Note: In events with two genders, the men's tournament winners will be listed before the women's tournament winners.

== CCA-sanctioned events ==
This section lists events sanctioned by and/or conducted by the Canadian Curling Association (CCA). The following events in bold have been confirmed by the CCA as are part of the 2013–14 Season of Champions programme.

Event	Winning team	Runner-up team
**Capital One Road to the Roar**; Kitchener, Ontario, Nov. 5–10	(British Columbia) John Morris	(Ontario) Brad Jacobs
**Capital One Road to the Roar**; Kitchener, Ontario, Nov. 5–10	(Alberta) Renée Sonnenberg	(Alberta) Valerie Sweeting
Canadian Mixed Curling Championship; Ottawa, Ontario, Nov. 15–23	Alberta	Ontario
The Dominion Curling Club Championship; Thunder Bay, Ontario, Nov. 18–23	Alberta	Saskatchewan
The Dominion Curling Club Championship; Thunder Bay, Ontario, Nov. 18–23	Manitoba	Saskatchewan
**Tim Hortons Roar of the Rings**; Winnipeg, Manitoba, Dec. 1–8	(Ontario) Brad Jacobs	(British Columbia) John Morris
**Tim Hortons Roar of the Rings**; Winnipeg, Manitoba, Dec. 1–8	(Manitoba) Jennifer Jones	(Ontario) Sherry Middaugh
Winter Universiade; Trentino, Italy, Dec. 12–20	Sweden	Great Britain
Winter Universiade; Trentino, Italy, Dec. 12–20	Russia	South Korea
**Continental Cup of Curling**; Las Vegas, Nevada, Jan. 16–19	Team North America	Team World
**Canadian Junior Curling Championships**; Liverpool, Nova Scotia, Jan. 18–26	Manitoba	New Brunswick
**Canadian Junior Curling Championships**; Liverpool, Nova Scotia, Jan. 18–26	Alberta	British Columbia
**Tournament of Hearts**; Montréal, Quebec, Feb. 1–9	Canada	Alberta
Winter Olympic Games; Sochi, Russia, Feb. 10–21	Canada	Great Britain
Winter Olympic Games; Sochi, Russia, Feb. 10–21	Canada	Sweden
World Junior Curling Championships; Flims, Switzerland, Feb. 26–Mar. 5	Switzerland	Scotland
World Junior Curling Championships; Flims, Switzerland, Feb. 26–Mar. 5	Canada	South Korea
**Tim Hortons Brier**; Kamloops, British Columbia, Mar. 1–9	Alberta	British Columbia
Winter Paralympic Games; Sochi, Russia, Mar. 8–15	Canada	Russia
**World Women's Curling Championship**; Saint John, New Brunswick, Mar. 15–23	Switzerland	Canada
CCAA Curling Invitational Championship; Sault Ste. Marie, Ontario, Mar. 19–22	(Alberta) MacEwan Griffins	(Alberta) NAIT Ooks
CCAA Curling Invitational Championship; Sault Ste. Marie, Ontario, Mar. 19–22	(Alberta) Red Deer Kings	(Ontario) Humber Hawks
CIS/CCA University Curling Championships; Regina, Saskatchewan, Mar. 19–23	Manitoba Bisons	Alberta Golden Bears
CIS/CCA University Curling Championships; Regina, Saskatchewan, Mar. 19–23	(Ontario) Carleton Ravens	Alberta Pandas
Canadian Mixed Doubles Curling Trials; Ottawa, Ontario, Mar. 19–23	(Ontario) Tuck/Tuck	(Alberta) Thomas/Park
Canadian Senior Curling Championships; Yellowknife, Northwest Territories, Mar. 20–30	Nova Scotia	Manitoba
Canadian Senior Curling Championships; Yellowknife, Northwest Territories, Mar. 20–30	Manitoba	Saskatchewan
World Men's Curling Championship; Beijing, China, Mar. 29 – Apr. 6	Norway	Sweden
Canadian Masters Curling Championships; Coaldale, Alberta, Mar. 31 – Apr. 6	Saskatchewan	Alberta
Canadian Masters Curling Championships; Coaldale, Alberta, Mar. 31 – Apr. 6	Saskatchewan	Ontario
World Senior Curling Championships; Dumfries, Scotland, Apr. 23–30	Canada	Sweden
World Senior Curling Championships; Dumfries, Scotland, Apr. 23–30	Scotland	Canada
World Mixed Doubles Curling Championship; Dumfries, Scotland, Apr. 23–30	Switzerland	Sweden
Canadian Wheelchair Curling Championship; Boucherville, Quebec, Apr. 28 – May 4	Manitoba	Quebec

== Other events ==
Note: Events that have not been placed on the CCA's list of sanctioned events are listed here. If an event is listed on the CCA's final list for the 2013–14 curling season, it will be moved up to the "CCA-sanctioned events" section.

Event	Winning team		Runner-up team
New Zealand Winter Games; Naseby, New Zealand, Aug. 16–23	M	Japan	New Zealand
New Zealand Winter Games; Naseby, New Zealand, Aug. 16–23	XD	Australia	New Zealand
European Mixed Curling Championship; Edinburgh, Scotland, Sep. 14–21	Germany		Scotland
European Curling Championships – Group C Copenhagen, Denmark, Oct. 7–13	C	Wales	Serbia
European Curling Championships – Group C Copenhagen, Denmark, Oct. 7–13	C	Belarus	Slovenia
Pacific-Asia Curling Championships; Shanghai, China, Nov. 11–19	China		Japan
Pacific-Asia Curling Championships; Shanghai, China, Nov. 11–19	South Korea		China
European Curling Championships; Stavanger, Norway, Nov. 22–30	A	Switzerland	Norway
European Curling Championships; Stavanger, Norway, Nov. 22–30	A	Sweden	Scotland
European Curling Championships; Stavanger, Norway, Nov. 22–30	B	Germany	Italy
European Curling Championships; Stavanger, Norway, Nov. 22–30	B	Finland	Estonia
Winter Olympic Games Qualification; Füssen, Germany, Dec. 10–15	Germany		United States
Winter Olympic Games Qualification; Füssen, Germany, Dec. 10–15	China		Japan
European Junior Curling Challenge; Lohja, Finland, Jan. 3–8	Austria		Netherlands
European Junior Curling Challenge; Lohja, Finland, Jan. 3–8	Italy		Hungary
Pacific-Asia Junior Curling Championships; Harbin, China, Jan. 8–14	China		South Korea
Pacific-Asia Junior Curling Championships; Harbin, China, Jan. 8–14	South Korea		China
Travelers All-Star Curling Skins Game; Banff, Alberta, Jan. 11–12	Team Jeff Stoughton		Team Kevin Martin
Arctic Winter Games; Fairbanks, Alaska, Mar. 15–22	Yukon		Northern Alberta
Arctic Winter Games; Fairbanks, Alaska, Mar. 15–22	Northern Alberta		Northwest Territories

== World Curling Tour ==
Grand Slam events in bold.

=== Men's events ===
Week	Event	Winning skip	Runner-up skip
3	Baden Masters; Baden, Switzerland, Aug. 30 – Sep. 1	(Canada) Brad Gushue	(Norway) Thomas Ulsrud
4	StuSells Oakville Tankard; Oakville, Ontario, Sep. 5–8	(Ontario) Brad Jacobs	(Alberta) Kevin Koe
4	Denham Hospitality Summer Classic; Leduc, Alberta, Sep. 6–8	(China) Liu Rui	(British Columbia) Daylan Vavrek
4	Good Times Bonspiel; Calgary, Alberta, Sep. 6–8	(Alberta) Terry Meek	(Alberta) Bert Martin
5	The Shoot-Out; Edmonton, Alberta, Sep. 12–15	(Alberta) Kevin Martin	(Saskatchewan) Steve Laycock
6	AMJ Campbell Shorty Jenkins Classic; Brockville, Ontario, Sep. 19–22	(Ontario) Brad Jacobs	(Manitoba) Jeff Stoughton
6	Cloverdale Cash Spiel; Surrey, British Columbia, Sep. 20–22	(British Columbia) Dean Joanisse	(British Columbia) Ken McArdle
6	FSCC Early Cash; Blaine, Minnesota, Sep. 20–22	(Wisconsin) Craig Brown	(Massachusetts) Korey Dropkin
7	China Open; Tianjin, China, Sep 18–24	(Canada) Mike McEwen	(China) Liu Rui
7	KW Fall Classic; Waterloo, Ontario, Sep. 26–29	(Ontario) Scott McDonald	(Ontario) Jake Walker
7	Point Optical Curling Classic; Saskatoon, Saskatchewan, Sep. 27–30	(Manitoba) Jeff Stoughton	(Alberta) Kevin Martin
8	Swiss Cup Basel; Basel, Switzerland, Oct. 3–6	(Norway) Thomas Ulsrud	(Sweden) Oskar Eriksson
8	Prestige Hotels & Resorts Curling Classic; Vernon, British Columbia, Oct. 3–6	(Alberta) Kevin Koe	(Washington (state)) Brady Clark
8	St. Paul Cash Spiel; St. Paul, Minnesota, Oct. 4–6	(Manitoba) Scott Ramsay	(Minnesota) Tyler George
8	Avonair Cash Spiel; Edmonton, Alberta, Oct. 4–6	(Alberta) Ted Appelman	(Alberta) Shane Park
9	StuSells Toronto Tankard; Toronto, Ontario, Oct. 11–14	(Ontario) Glenn Howard	(Manitoba) Mike McEwen
9	Direct Horizontal Drilling Fall Classic; Edmonton, Alberta, Oct. 11–14	(Alberta) Kevin Martin	(Saskatchewan) Brock Virtue
10	Canad Inns Prairie Classic; Portage la Prairie, Manitoba, Oct. 18–21	(Manitoba) Mike McEwen	(Ontario) Glenn Howard
10	Medicine Hat Charity Classic; Medicine Hat, Alberta, Oct. 18–21	(Saskatchewan) Randy Bryden	(Saskatchewan) Scott Bitz
10	Kamloops Crown of Curling; Kamloops, British Columbia, Oct. 18–21	(British Columbia) Grant Dezura	(British Columbia) Dean Joanisse
10	Stroud Sleeman Cash Spiel; Stroud, Ontario, Oct. 17–20	(Ontario) Greg Balsdon	(New York (state)) Heath McCormick
10	Thompson Curling Challenge; Urdorf, Switzerland, Oct. 18–20	(Switzerland) Bernhard Werthemann	(Switzerland) Reto Gribi
11	Cactus Pheasant Classic; Brooks, Alberta, Oct. 24–27	(Manitoba) Mike McEwen	(Switzerland) Sven Michel
11	Challenge Chateau Cartier de Gatineau; Masson & Buckhingham, Quebec, Oct. 24–27	(Newfoundland and Labrador) Brad Gushue	(Ontario) Rob Rumfeldt
11	Curling Masters Champéry; Champéry, Switzerland, Oct. 25–27	(Canada) James Grattan	(Switzerland) Marc Pfister
11	Bernick's Miller Lite Open; Bemidji, Minnesota, Oct. 24–27	(Ontario) Jeff Currie	(Minnesota) John Shuster
11	Shamrock Shotgun; Edmonton, Alberta, Oct. 25–27	(Alberta) Tom Appelman	(Alberta) Mike Hutchings
11	McKee Homes Fall Curling Classic; Airdrie, Alberta, Oct. 25–27	(Alberta) Matthew Blandford	(Alberta) Josh Lambden
11	Stonebridge Hotel Curling Classic; Airdrie, Alberta, Oct. 25–27	(Alberta) Kurt Balderston	(British Columbia) Kerry Moore
12	**The Masters Grand Slam of Curling**; Abbotsford, British Columbia, Oct. 29 – Nov. 3	(Ontario) Glenn Howard	(Alberta) Kevin Martin
12	Red Deer Curling Classic; Red Deer, Alberta, Nov. 1–4	(Saskatchewan) Brock Virtue	(British Columbia) Jeff Richard
12	Courtesy Freight Northern Ontario Superspiel; Thunder Bay, Ontario, Nov. 1–3	(Ontario) Trevor Bonot	(Ontario) Bryan Burgess
13	Original 16 WCT Bonspiel; Calgary, Alberta, Nov. 8–10	(South Korea) Kim Chang-min	(Alberta) Thomas Scoffin
13	Whites Drug Store Classic; Swan River, Manitoba, Nov. 8–11	(Switzerland) Pascal Hess	(Saskatchewan) Jason Jacobson
13	Edinburgh International; Edinburgh, Scotland, Nov. 8–10	(Scotland) David Edwards	(Scotland) Ross McCleary
13	Coronation Business Group Classic; Maple Ridge, British Columbia, Nov. 9–11	(British Columbia) Sean Geall	(British Columbia) Grant Dezura
13	Dave Jones Molson Mayflower Cashspiel; Halifax, Nova Scotia, Nov. 9–11	(Nova Scotia) Lee Buott	(Nova Scotia) Mark Dacey
14	**Canadian Open of Curling**; Medicine Hat, Alberta, Nov. 13–17	(Alberta) Kevin Koe	(Newfoundland and Labrador) Brad Gushue
14	Dauphin Clinic Pharmacy Classic; Dauphin, Manitoba, Nov. 15–18	(Saskatchewan) Scott Bitz	(Manitoba) David Kraichy
14	Mount Lawn Gord Carroll Classic; Whitby, Ontario, Nov. 13–17	(Ontario) Wayne Tuck Jr.	(Ontario) Craig Kochan
15	Challenge Casino de Charlevoix; Clermont, Quebec, Nov. 21–24	(Ontario) Brad Jacobs	(Quebec) Martin Ferland
15	DEKALB Superspiel; Morris, Manitoba, Nov. 21–24	(Manitoba) Steen Sigurdson	(Saskatchewan) Jeff Hartung
15	Spruce Grove Cashspiel; Spruce Grove, Alberta, Nov. 22–24	(Alberta) Brendan Bottcher	(Alberta) Jamie King
16	Weatherford Curling Classic; Estevan, Saskatchewan, Nov. 29 – Dec. 2	(China) Liu Rui	(Saskatchewan) Bruce Korte
16	Coors Light Cash Spiel; Duluth, Minnesota, Nov. 29 – Dec. 1	(Wisconsin) Craig Brown	(Ontario) Jeff Currie
16	Seattle Cash Spiel; Seattle, Washington, Nov. 29 – Dec. 1	(Washington (state)) Brady Clark	(British Columbia) Jeff Richard
16	MCT Championships; Beausejour, Manitoba, Nov. 29 – Dec. 1	(Manitoba) Kelly Marnoch	(Manitoba) William Lyburn
16	Black Diamond/High River Cash; Black Diamond/High River, Alberta, Nov. 29 – Dec. 1	(Alberta) Robert Schlender	(Alberta) Dean Mamer
17	Madison Cash Spiel; Madison, Wisconsin, Dec. 6–8	(Minnesota) Todd Birr	(Minnesota) Mike Farbelow
18	Curl Mesabi Classic; Eveleth, Minnesota, Dec. 13-15	(Ontario) Bryan Burgess	(Switzerland) Sven Michel
18	Vic Open; Quebec City, Quebec, Dec. 12–15	(Quebec) Martin Ferland	(Quebec) Philippe Lemay
18	Truro Cashspiel; Truro, Nova Scotia, Dec. 13–15	(Nova Scotia) Chad Stevens	(Nova Scotia) Mark Kehoe
21	Mercure Perth Masters; Perth, Scotland, Jan. 2–5	(Scotland) Logan Gray	(Sweden) Oskar Eriksson
21	FSCC U.S. Open of Curling; Blaine, Minnesota, Jan. 3–5	(China) Liu Rui	(Manitoba) Scott Ramsay
24	German Masters; Hamburg, Germany, Jan. 24–26	(Switzerland) Sven Michel	(Switzerland) Peter de Cruz
24	Red Square Classic; Moscow, Russia, Jan. 20–22	(Russia) Alexey Tselousov	(Canada) Brad Gushue
31	**The National**; Fort McMurray, Alberta, Mar. 12–16	(Ontario) Glenn Howard	(Newfoundland and Labrador) Brad Gushue
33	Pomeroy Inn & Suites Prairie Showdown; Grande Prairie, Alberta, Mar. 27–30	(Manitoba) Mike McEwen	(Manitoba) Jeff Stoughton
35	European Masters; St. Gallen, Switzerland, Apr. 9–12	(Switzerland) Pascal Hess	(Scotland) Logan Gray
36	**The Players' Championship**; Summerside, Prince Edward Island, Apr. 15–20	(Alberta) Kevin Martin	(Ontario) Brad Jacobs

=== Women's events ===
Week	Event	Winning skip	Runner-up skip
1	Fort Wayne Summer Cash Spiel; Fort Wayne, Indiana, Aug. 15–18	(China) Wang Bingyu	(China) Jiang Yilun
4	StuSells Oakville Tankard; Oakville, Ontario, Sep. 5–8	(Ontario) Sherry Middaugh	(Ontario) Cathy Auld
4	Denham Hospitality Summer Classic; Leduc, Alberta, Sep. 6–8	(China) Wang Bingyu	(Alberta) Valerie Sweeting
4	Good Times Bonspiel; Calgary, Alberta, Sep. 6–8	(Alberta) Cheryl Bernard	(Alberta) Jocelyn Peterman
5	The Shoot-Out; Edmonton, Alberta, Sep. 12–15	(Alberta) Crystal Webster	(Saskatchewan) Chantelle Eberle
6	AMJ Campbell Shorty Jenkins Classic; Brockville, Ontario, Sep. 19–22	(Switzerland) Mirjam Ott	(Ontario) Rachel Homan
6	Cloverdale Cash Spiel; Surrey, British Columbia, Sep. 20–22	(British Columbia) Patti Knezevic	(British Columbia) Kalia Van Osch
6	FSCC Early Cash; Blaine, Minnesota, Sep. 20–22	(Minnesota) Cory Christensen	(Minnesota) Cassie Potter
6	Stockholm Ladies Cup; Stockholm, Sweden, Sep. 20–22	(Switzerland) Silvana Tirinzoni	(Switzerland) Michèle Jäggi
7	China Open; Tianjin, China, Sep 18–24	(South Korea) Kim Ji-sun	(Canada) Chelsea Carey
7	KW Fall Classic; Waterloo, Ontario, Sep. 26–29	(Ontario) Julie Hastings	(Ontario) Susan McKnight
8	Prestige Hotels & Resorts Curling Classic; Vernon, British Columbia, Oct. 3–6	(China) Wang Bingyu	(Switzerland) Mirjam Ott
8	St. Paul Cash Spiel; St. Paul, Minnesota, Oct. 4–6	(Manitoba) Michelle Montford	(Minnesota) Alexandra Carlson
8	Avonair Cash Spiel; Edmonton, Alberta, Oct. 4–6	(Alberta) Jessie Kaufman	(Alberta) Holly Whyte
9	**Curlers Corner Autumn Gold Curling Classic**; Calgary, Alberta, Oct. 11–14	(Scotland) Eve Muirhead	(China) Wang Bingyu
9	Women's Masters Basel; Basel, Switzerland, Oct. 11–13	(Switzerland) Silvana Tirinzoni	(Switzerland) Mirjam Ott
10	Medicine Hat Charity Classic; Medicine Hat, Alberta, Oct. 18–21	(Russia) Anna Sidorova	(Japan) Sayaka Yoshimura
10	Atkins Curling Supplies Women's Classic; Winnipeg, Manitoba, Oct. 18–21	(Manitoba) Darcy Robertson	(Ontario) Jill Thurston
10	Kamloops Crown of Curling; Kamloops, British Columbia, Oct. 18–21	(Minnesota) Allison Pottinger	(Japan) Ayumi Ogasawara
10	Stroud Sleeman Cash Spiel; Stroud, Ontario, Oct. 17–20	(Ontario) Heather Graham	(Ontario) Julie Hastings
11	Challenge Chateau Cartier de Gatineau; Buckingham & Masson, Quebec, Oct. 24–27	(Ontario) Lisa Farnell	(Ontario) Katie Morrissey
11	**Manitoba Liquor & Lotteries Women's Classic**; Winnipeg, Manitoba, Oct. 25–28	(Manitoba) Jennifer Jones	(Manitoba) Jill Thurston
11	Shamrock Shotgun; Edmonton, Alberta, Oct. 25–27	(China) Jiang Yilun	(Alberta) Jessie Kaufman
12	**The Masters Grand Slam of Curling**; Abbotsford, British Columbia, Oct. 29 – Nov. 3	(Ontario) Rachel Homan	(Scotland) Eve Muirhead
12	Royal LePage OVCA Women's Fall Classic; Kemptville, Ontario, Oct. 31 – Nov. 3	(Prince Edward Island) Suzanne Birt	(Manitoba) Darcy Robertson
12	Red Deer Curling Classic; Red Deer, Alberta, Nov. 1–4	(Switzerland) Binia Feltscher	(Alberta) Kristie Moore
13	Coronation Business Group Classic; Maple Ridge, British Columbia, Nov. 9–11	(British Columbia) Roberta Kuhn	(British Columbia) Kalia Van Osch
13	Dave Jones Molson Mayflower Cashspiel; Halifax, Nova Scotia, Nov. 9–11	(Nova Scotia) Heather Smith	(New Brunswick) Andrea Crawford
14	Mount Lawn Gord Carroll Classic; Whitby, Ontario, Nov. 13–17	(Ontario) Julie Hastings	(Ontario) Laura Payne
14	International ZO Women's Tournament; Wetzikon, Switzerland, Nov. 15–17	(Russia) Anna Sidorova	(Switzerland) Silvana Tirinzoni
14	**Colonial Square Ladies Classic**; Saskatoon, Saskatchewan, Nov. 15–18	(Manitoba) Jennifer Jones	(Switzerland) Michèle Jäggi
15	DEKALB Superspiel; Morris, Manitoba, Nov. 21–24	(Manitoba) Barb Spencer	(Switzerland) Michèle Jäggi
15	Spruce Grove Cashspiel; Spruce Grove, Alberta, Nov. 22–24	(Alberta) Amy Nixon	(Alberta) Nicky Kaufman
16	Boundary Ford Curling Classic; Lloydminster, Alberta, Nov. 29 – Dec. 2	(Saskatchewan) Amber Holland	(Alberta) Jessie Kaufman
16	MCT Championships; Beausejour, Manitoba Nov. 29 – Dec. 1	(Manitoba) Joelle Brown	(Manitoba) Michelle Montford
16	Molson Cash Spiel; Duluth, Minnesota, Nov. 29 – Dec. 1	(Wisconsin) Jenna Haag	(Minnesota) Courtney George
21	Yi Chun Ladies International; Yichun, China, Jan. 3–5	(Canada) Tracy Horgan	(China) Jiang Yilun
22	International Bernese Ladies Cup; Bern, Switzerland, Jan. 10–12	(Scotland) Eve Muirhead	(Russia) Anna Sidorova
23	Glynhill Ladies International; Glasgow, Scotland, Jan. 17–19	(China) Wang Bingyu	(Switzerland) Mirjam Ott
33	Pomeroy Inn & Suites Prairie Showdown; Grande Prairie, Alberta, Mar. 27–30	(Switzerland) Silvana Tirinzoni	(Scotland) Eve Muirhead
36	**The Players' Championship**; Summerside, Prince Edward Island, Apr. 15–20	(Manitoba) Jennifer Jones	(Ontario) Rachel Homan

== WCT Order of Merit rankings ==
Men

Final Standings
#	Skip	Points
1	(Ontario) Brad Jacobs	468.800
2	(Ontario) Glenn Howard	429.020
3	(Manitoba) Jeff Stoughton	426.500
4	(Alberta) Kevin Koe	426.240
5	(Manitoba) Mike McEwen	375.585
6	(Newfoundland and Labrador) Brad Gushue	330.635
7	(Sweden) Niklas Edin	328.155
8	(Alberta) Kevin Martin	324.376
9	(Norway) Thomas Ulsrud	282.920
10	(British Columbia) John Morris	265.118

Women

Final Standings
#	Skip	Points
1	(Manitoba) Jennifer Jones	472.800
2	(Ontario) Rachel Homan	441.820
3	(Scotland) Eve Muirhead	408.225
4	(Saskatchewan) Stefanie Lawton	335.810
5	(Sweden) Margaretha Sigfridsson	310.270
6	(Switzerland) Mirjam Ott	276.275
7	(Russia) Anna Sidorova	246.895
8	(Manitoba) Chelsea Carey	246.020
9	(Switzerland) Silvana Tirinzoni	238.853
10	(Alberta) Heather Nedohin	237.520

== WCT Money List ==
Men

Final Standings
#	Skip	$ (CAD)
1	(Manitoba) Mike McEwen	90,623
2	(Ontario) Glenn Howard	90,300
3	(Alberta) Kevin Martin	89,900
4	(Newfoundland and Labrador) Brad Gushue	76,069
5	(Alberta) Kevin Koe	75,000
6	(Ontario) Brad Jacobs	62,400
7	(Manitoba) Jeff Stoughton	61,000
8	(Switzerland) Sven Michel	50,844
9	(Switzerland) Pascal Hess	43,831
10	(China) Rui Liu	38,554

Women

Final Standings
#	Skip	$ (CAD)
1	(Switzerland) Silvana Tirinzoni	71,887
2	(Manitoba) Jennifer Jones	66,400
3	(Scotland) Eve Muirhead	58,150
4	(Ontario) Rachel Homan	51,900
5	(Switzerland) Michèle Jäggi	39,673
6	(Switzerland) Mirjam Ott	35,215
7	(China) Bingyu Wang	33,121
8	(Russia) Anna Sidorova	29,312
9	(Saskatchewan) Stefanie Lawton	28,500
10	(Sweden) Margaretha Sigfridsson	26,314

== The Dominion MA Cup ==
The Dominion MA Cup (presented by TSN) was contested in the 2013–14 season. The Cup was awarded to the Canadian Curling Association Member Association (MA) who has had the most success during the season in CCA-sanctioned events. Events included the Canadian mixed championship, men's and women's juniors championships, the Scotties, the Brier, the men's and women's senior championships and the national wheelchair championship. Points were awarded based on placement in each of the events, with the top association receiving 14 points and each association under receiving points in decrements of one point.

=== Standings ===
Final standings

Rank	Member Association	CMCC	CWJCC	CMJCC	Scotties	Brier	CWSCC	CMSCC	CWhCC	Total Pts.	Avg. Pts.
1	Alberta	14	14	12	13	14	9	11	11	98	12.250
2	Manitoba	7	10	14	12	12	14	13	14	96	12.000
3	Saskatchewan	12	9	9	11	10	13	10	9	83	10.375
4	Ontario	13	11	11	5	7	12	9	12	80	10.000
5	Nova Scotia	9	12	10	7	3	11	14	6	72	9.000
6	British Columbia	4	13	7	9	13	8	7	10	71	8.875
7	New Brunswick	11	8	13	10	8	10	5	5	70	8.750
8	Quebec	10	7	5	4	11	4	6	13	60	7.500
9	Northern Ontario	6	4	8	n/a	4	7	12	8	49	7.000
10	Prince Edward Island	8	6	3	6	6	6	3	n/a	38	5.429
11	Newfoundland and Labrador	3	3	4	8	9	5	2	7	37	5.125
12	Yukon	2	5	6	3	2	n/a	8	n/a	26	4.333
13	Northwest Territories	5	2	2	2	5	3	4	n/a	23	3.286
14	Nunavut	1	1	1	n/a	n/a	2	1	n/a	6	1.200

Preceded by 2012–13	2013–14 curling season August 2013 – May 2014	Succeeded by 2014–15
