= Cloverdale Cash Spiel =

Curling tournament in Canada

Location in Canada

The Cloverdale Cash Spiel was an annual bonspiel, or curling tournament on the men's and women's World Curling Tour, that took place at the Cloverdale Curling Club in Cloverdale, British Columbia (in Surrey). The tournament was held in a round-robin format. The tournament was established in 2011 as one of the first events of the season, and was last held in 2016. The event counted toward the Canadian Team Ranking System, which hands out points based on performances at CTRS events and deals with qualification for the Canadian Olympic Curling Trials.

== Past champions ==
=== Men ===
Year	Winning team	Runner up team	Purse (CAD)
2011	(Russia) Alexey Tselousov, Andrey Drozdov, Alexey Stukalsky, Aleksey Kamnev	(British Columbia) Jeff Richard, Brent Pierce, Kevin Recksiedler, Grant Dezura	$8,050
2012	(British Columbia) Brent Pierce, Jeff Richard, Kevin Recksiedler, Grant Dezura	(British Columbia) Sean Geall, Jay Peachey, Sebastien Robillard, Mark Olson	$8,050
2013	(British Columbia) Michael Johnson, Dean Joanisse, Paul Cseke, John Cullen	(British Columbia) Ken McArdle, Dylan Somerton, Chase Martyn, Michael Horita	$8,050
2014	(British Columbia) Kevin MacKenzie, Grant Dezura, Jamie Smith, Kevin Recksiedler	(British Columbia) Sean Geall, Andrew Bilesky, Steve Kopf, Mark Olson	$8,500
2015	(British Columbia) Dean Joanisse, Paul Cseke, Jay Wakefield, John Cullen	(British Columbia) Chase Martyn, Cody Johnston, Jeff Guignard, William Sutton	$8,200
2016	(China) Liu Rui, Xu Xiaoming, Zang Jialiang, Wang Jinbo	(British Columbia) Adam Cseke, Andrew Nerpin, Matt Tolley, Cam Weir	$9,300

=== Women ===
Year	Winning team	Runner up team	Purse (CAD)
2011	(British Columbia) Kelley Law, Shannon Aleksic, Kirsten Fox, Dawn Suliak	(Russia) Liudmila Privivkova, Anna Sidorova, Nkeiruka Ezekh, Ekaterina Galkina	$8,050
2012	(China) Wang Bingyu, Liu Yin, Yue Qingshuang, Zhou Yan	(British Columbia) Allison MacInnes, Grace MacInnes, Diane Gushulak, Jacalyn Brown	$8,050
2013	(British Columbia) Patti Knezevic, Jen Rusnell, Kristen Fewster, Rhonda Camozzi	(British Columbia) Kalia Van Osch, Steph Jackson, Jessie Sanderson, Carley Sandwith	$8,050
2014	(China) Liu Sijia, Wang Rui, Liu Jinli, Yu Xinna	(British Columbia) Sarah Wark, Simone Brosseau, Michelle Allen, Rachelle Kallechy	$8,500
2015	(British Columbia) Diane Gushulak, Grace MacInnes, Jessie Sanderson, Sandra Comadina	(British Columbia) Patti Knezevic, Kristen Pilote, Jen Rusnell, Rhonda Camozzi	$8,200
2016	(British Columbia) Diane Gushulak, Grace MacInnes, Jessie Sanderson, Sandra Comadina	(British Columbia) Lindsay Hudyma. Steph Jackson-Baier, Holly Donaldson, Carley St. Blaze	$5,950
