= 2012 Cloverdale Cash Spiel =

World Curling Tour event

- Host city: Surrey, British Columbia
- Arena: Cloverdale Curling Club
- Dates: September 14–16
- Men's winner: (British Columbia) Brent Pierce
- Curling club: Royal City CC; New Westminster, British Columbia
- Skip: Brent Pierce
- Third: Jeff Richard
- Second: Kevin Recksiedler
- Lead: Grant Dezura
- Finalist: (British Columbia) Sean Geall
- Women's winner: (China) Bingyu Wang
- Curling club: Harbin, China
- Skip: Wang Bingyu
- Third: Liu Yin
- Second: Yue Qingshuang
- Lead: Zhou Yan
- Finalist: (British Columbia) Allison MacInnes

The 2012 Cloverdale Cash Spiel is an annual curling bonspiel that was held from September 14 to 16 at the Cloverdale Curling Club in Surrey, British Columbia as part of the 2012–13 World Curling Tour. The purses for the men's and women's events were CAD$8,050 for both events, with the winning teams of Brent Pierce and Wang Bingyu taking home the prize.

== Men ==
=== Teams ===
Skip	Third	Second	Lead	Locale
Andrew Bilesky	Stephen Kopf	Derek Errington	Aaron Watson	New Westminster, British Columbia
Richard Brower	Jan Bos	Larry MacDonald	Deryk Brower	British Columbia
Mike Calcagno	Brad Casper	Peter Sommer	Jeremy Dinsel	(Washington (state)) Seattle, Washington
Brady Clark	Sean Beighton	Darren Lehto	Steve Lundeen	(Washington (state)) Seattle, Washington
Jody Epp	Blair Cusack	Brad Kocurek	James York	British Columbia
Sean Geall	Jay Peachey	Sebastien Robillard	Mark Olson	New Westminster, British Columbia
Tyler Klymchuk	Corey Chester	Sanjay Bowry	Rhys Gamache	Vancouver, British Columbia
Lainglais				British Columbia
Ken McArdle	Jared Bowles	Dylan Somerton	Michael Horita	New Westminster, British Columbia
Brent Pierce	Jeff Richard	Kevin Recksiedler	Grant Dezura	New Westminster, British Columbia
Leon Romaniuk	Wes Johnson	Paul Lyttle	Kent Bird	(Washington (state)) Seattle, Washington
Randie Shen	Brendon Liu	Nicolas Hsu	Justin Hsu	Taipei City, Chinese Taipei
Mel Steffin		Curtis Bogren	Pierre Gallant	British Columbia
Michael Johnson (fourth)	Paul Cseke	Jay Wakefield (skip)	John Cullen	New Westminster, British Columbia
Zou Dejia	Chen Luan	Ji Yangsong	Li Guang Xu	Harbin, China

=== Round-robin standings ===
Pool D	W	L
(British Columbia) Andrew Bilesky	3	0
(Washington (state)) Leon Romaniuk	2	1
(British Columbia) Ken McArdle	2	2
(British Columbia) Richard Brower	1	3
(British Columbia) Lainglais	1	3

Pool E	W	L
(British Columbia) Jay Wakefield	4	0
(British Columbia) Brent Pierce	2	1
(China) Zou Dejia	2	2
(British Columbia) Tyler Klymchuk	1	2
(Washington (state)) Mike Calcagno	0	4

Pool F	W	L
(Washington (state)) Brady Clark	3	1
(British Columbia) Sean Geall	3	1
(British Columbia) Mel Steffin	2	2
(British Columbia) Jody Epp	1	3
(Chinese Taipei) Randy Shen	1	3

=== Playoffs ===
Quarterfinals
(British Columbia) Brent Pierce	8
(Washington (state)) Brady Clark	3
(British Columbia) Sean Geall	6
(Washington (state)) Leon Romaniuk	1

Semifinals
(British Columbia) Andrew Bilesky	7
(British Columbia) Brent Pierce	8
(British Columbia) Jay Wakefield	3
(British Columbia) Sean Geall	5

Final
(British Columbia) Brent Pierce	8
(British Columbia) Sean Geall	2

== Women ==
=== Teams ===
Skip	Third	Second	Lead	Locale
Sarah Wark (fourth)	Nicole Backe (skip)	Kesa Van Osch	Janelle Erwin	Nanaimo, British Columbia
Alexandra Carlson	Monica Walker	Kendall Moulton	Jordan Moulton	Minneapolis, Minnesota
Kirsten Fox	Kristen Recksiedler	Trysta Vandale	Dawn Suliak	New Westminster, British Columbia
Dezaray Hawes	Gabrielle Plonka	Ali Renwick	Caitlin Campbell	New Westminster, British Columbia
Jiang Yilun	Wang Rui	Yaoi Mingyue	She Quitong	(China) Harbin, Heilongjiang
Roberta Kuhn	Karla Thompson	Michelle Ramsay	Christen Wilson	Vernon, British Columbia
Allison MacInnes	Grace MacInnes	Diane Gushulak	Jacalyn Brown	Kamloops, British Columbia
Marla Mallett	Kelly Shimizu	Shannon Ward	Barb Zbeetnoff	Cloverdale, British Columbia
Nicole Montgomery	Kayte Gyles	Megan Montgomery	Cynthia Parton	New Westminster, British Columbia
Marilou Richter	Darah Provencal	Jessie Sanderson	Sandra Comadina	New Westminster, British Columbia
Kristen Fewster (fourth)	Jen Rusnell (skip)	Patti Knezevic	Rhonda Camozzi	Prince George, British Columbia
Adina Tasaka	Rachelle Kallechy	Lindsae Page	Kelsi Jones	New Westminster, British Columbia
Brandi Tinkler	Ashley Nordin	Alexandra Nash-McLeod		Victoria, British Columbia
Kalia Van Osch	Marika Van Osch	Brooklyn Leitch	Carly Sandwith	Victoria, British Columbia
Wang Bingyu	Liu Yin	Yue Qingshuang	Zhou Yan	Harbin, China

=== Round-robin standings ===
Pool A	W	L
(China) Wang Bingyu	4	0
(Minnesota) Alexandra Carlson	2	2
(British Columbia) Jen Rusnell	1	2
(British Columbia) Kalia Van Osch	1	2
(British Columbia) Kirsten Fox	1	3

Pool B	W	L
(China) Jiang Yilun	3	0
(British Columbia) Nicole Backe	2	1
(British Columbia) Roberta Kuhn	2	2
(British Columbia) Marla Mallett	1	3
(British Columbia) Brandi Tinkler	1	3

Pool C	W	L
(British Columbia) Allison MacInnes	3	1
(British Columbia) Marilou Richter	3	1
(British Columbia) Adina Tasaka	3	1
(British Columbia) Nicole Montgomery	1	3
(British Columbia) Dezaray Hawes	0	3

=== Playoffs ===
Quarterfinals
(British Columbia) Marilou Richter	5
(Minnesota) Alexandra Carlson	4
(British Columbia) Allison MacInnes	6
(British Columbia) Nicole Backe	2

Semifinals
(China) Wang Bingyu	8
(British Columbia) Marilou Richter	2
(China) Jiang Yilun	2
(British Columbia) Allison MacInnes	7

Final
(China) Wang Bingyu	8
(British Columbia) Allison MacInnes	0
