= Kelly Evans (disambiguation) =

Kelly Evans is a journalist.

Kelly Evans may also refer to:

- Kellylee Evans, musician
- Kelly Evans (curler) from List of teams on the 2013–14 World Curling Tour
- Devon Kelly-Evans, English association football player, brother of Dion
- Dion Kelly-Evans, English association football player, brother of Devon
