= 2014 Canadian Wheelchair Curling Championship =

- Host city: Boucherville, Quebec
- Arena: Centre de curling Boucherville
- Dates: April 28–May 4
- Winner: Manitoba
- Curling club: Assiniboine Memorial Curling Club, Winnipeg
- Skip: Dennis Thiessen
- Third: Mark Wherrett
- Second: Melissa Lecuyer
- Lead: Jamie Anseeuw
- Finalist: Quebec (Benoit Lessard)

The 2014 Canadian Wheelchair Curling Championship was held from April 28 to May 4 at the Centre de curling Boucherville in Boucherville, Quebec.

== Teams ==
The teams are listed as follows:

Province	Skip	Third	Second	Lead	Alternate	Locale
Alberta	Jack Smart	Bruno Yizek	Martin Purvis	Anne Hibberd	Wendy Frazier	Calgary Curling Club, Calgary
British Columbia	Darryl Neighbour	Frank LaBounty	Vince Miele	Alison Duddy	Gary Cormack	Richmond Curling Club, Vancouver
Manitoba	Dennis Thiessen	Mark Wherrett	Melissa Lecuyer	Jamie Anseeuw		Assiniboine Memorial Curling Club, Winnipeg
New Brunswick	Michael Fitzgerald	Jonathan Alexander	Jon Polley	Kayla Todd		Thistle St. Andrews Curling Club, Saint John
Newfoundland and Labrador	Joanne MacDonald	Darlene Jackman	Felix Green	Cecilia Carroll		RE/MAX Curling Club, St. John's
Northern Ontario	Gino Sonego	Doug Dean	Richard Dawid	Lola Graham	Chris Provenzano	Fort William Curling Club, Fort William
Nova Scotia	George Horning	Laughie Rutt	Steve Parfitt	Paige Fougere	Steve Auld	Lakeshore Curling Club, Lower Sackville
Ontario	Mike Munro	Mark Ideson	Katie Paialunga	Christine Lavallee	Tony Reynen	Bradford & District Curling Club, Bradford
Quebec	Benoit Lessard	Carl Marquis	Sébastien Boisvert	Johanne Daly		Magog Curling Club, Magog
Saskatchewan	Darwin Bender	Gil Dash	Marie Wright	Larry Schrader		Callie Curling Club, Regina

== Round-robin standings ==
Final round-robin standings

Key
Teams to Playoffs
Teams to Tiebreakers

Province	Skip	W	L
Quebec	Benoit Lessard	8	1
Ontario	Mike Munro	7	2
Alberta	Jack Smart	5	4
British Columbia	Darryl Neighbour	5	4
Manitoba	Dennis Thiessen	5	4
Saskatchewan	Darwin Bender	5	4
Newfoundland and Labrador	Joanne MacDonald	3	6
Northern Ontario	Gino Sonego	3	6
New Brunswick	Michael Fitzgerald	2	7
Nova Scotia	George Horning	2	7

== Round-robin results ==
All draw times are listed in Eastern Daylight Time (UTC−4).

=== Draw 1 ===
Monday, April 28, 18:00

Sheet A	1	2	3	4	5	6	7	8	Final
Saskatchewan (Bender)	0	0	1	2	0	3	1	X	7
Alberta (Smart)	1	1	0	0	1	0	0	X	3

Sheet B	1	2	3	4	5	6	7	8	Final
Quebec (Lessard)	1	0	0	0	1	0	1	3	6
Nova Scotia (Horning)	0	2	1	1	0	1	0	0	5

Sheet C	1	2	3	4	5	6	7	8	Final
New Brunswick (Fitzgerald)	0	2	1	0	2	0	0	0	5
Ontario (Munro)	1	0	0	2	0	1	2	3	9

Sheet D	1	2	3	4	5	6	7	8	Final
Newfoundland and Labrador (MacDonald)	0	0	3	1	0	0	0	1	5
Northern Ontario (Sonego)	1	1	0	0	2	3	2	0	9

Sheet E	1	2	3	4	5	6	7	8	Final
Manitoba (Thiessen)	0	2	0	1	0	3	0	X	6
British Columbia (Neighbour)	3	0	2	0	2	0	2	X	9

=== Draw 2 ===
Tuesday, April 29, 10:00

Sheet A	1	2	3	4	5	6	7	8	Final
Newfoundland and Labrador (MacDonald)	0	0	2	0	1	0	X	X	3
Quebec (Lessard)	4	3	0	2	0	2	X	X	11

Sheet B	1	2	3	4	5	6	7	8	Final
Saskatchewan (Bender)	0	0	0	2	0	2	1	1	6
Ontario (Munro)	1	1	1	0	4	0	0	0	7

Sheet C	1	2	3	4	5	6	7	8	Final
Alberta (Smart)	0	0	0	0	1	1	X	X	2
Manitoba (Thiessen)	3	3	2	1	0	0	X	X	9

Sheet D	1	2	3	4	5	6	7	8	Final
New Brunswick (Fitzgerald)	0	0	1	0	0	4	0	X	5
British Columbia (Neighbour)	2	2	0	2	1	0	2	X	9

Sheet E	1	2	3	4	5	6	7	8	EE	Final
Northern Ontario (Sonego)	2	2	0	0	1	0	2	0	0	7
Nova Scotia (Horning)	0	0	1	3	0	2	0	1	1	8

=== Draw 3 ===
Tuesday, April 29, 15:00

Sheet A	1	2	3	4	5	6	7	8	Final
Nova Scotia (Horning)	3	0	0	3	0	1	0	2	9
New Brunswick (Fitzgerald)	0	3	1	0	1	0	3	0	8

Sheet B	1	2	3	4	5	6	7	8	Final
Manitoba (Thiessen)	1	0	1	0	1	0	0	1	4
Northern Ontario (Sonego)	0	2	0	1	0	2	0	0	5

Sheet C	1	2	3	4	5	6	7	8	Final
British Columbia (Neighbour)	1	0	5	0	1	0	1	X	8
Saskatchewan (Bender)	0	1	0	1	0	1	0	X	3

Sheet D	1	2	3	4	5	6	7	8	Final
Quebec (Lessard)	0	1	0	0	0	0	0	X	1
Alberta (Smart)	2	0	1	1	1	1	1	X	7

Sheet E	1	2	3	4	5	6	7	8	Final
Ontario (Munro)	4	1	1	0	0	1	2	X	9
Newfoundland and Labrador (MacDonald)	0	0	0	1	2	0	0	X	3

=== Draw 4 ===
Wednesday, April 30, 10:00

Sheet A	1	2	3	4	5	6	7	8	Final
Manitoba (Thiessen)	1	0	0	0	0	1	1	X	3
Saskatchewan (Bender)	0	3	1	1	1	0	0	X	6

Sheet B	1	2	3	4	5	6	7	8	Final
New Brunswick (Fitzgerald)	0	4	2	0	1	0	0	0	7
Quebec (Lessard)	4	0	0	0	0	1	2	1	8

Sheet C	1	2	3	4	5	6	7	8	Final
Nova Scotia (Horning)	1	0	0	1	1	0	0	X	3
Newfoundland and Labrador (MacDonald)	0	2	2	0	0	1	5	X	10

Sheet D	1	2	3	4	5	6	7	8	Final
Northern Ontario (Sonego)	0	0	1	0	0	0	3	X	4
Ontario (Munro)	1	1	0	3	2	1	0	X	8

Sheet E	1	2	3	4	5	6	7	8	Final
British Columbia (Neighbour)	2	0	0	2	0	0	2	X	6
Alberta (Smart)	0	2	1	0	2	5	0	X	10

=== Draw 5 ===
Wednesday, April 30, 15:00

Sheet A	1	2	3	4	5	6	7	8	Final
British Columbia (Neighbour)	1	1	0	0	2	0	0	X	4
Newfoundland and Labrador (MacDonald)	0	0	3	1	0	3	1	X	8

Sheet B	1	2	3	4	5	6	7	8	Final
Ontario (Munro)	2	0	2	4	2	0	X	X	10
Alberta (Smart)	0	2	0	0	0	1	X	X	3

Sheet C	1	2	3	4	5	6	7	8	EE	Final
Northern Ontario (Sonego)	0	0	2	1	1	0	1	0	0	5
Quebec (Lessard)	1	2	0	0	0	1	0	1	2	7

Sheet D	1	2	3	4	5	6	7	8	Final
Nova Scotia (Horning)	0	0	1	1	0	0	1	X	3
Saskatchewan (Bender)	3	1	0	0	3	1	0	X	8

Sheet E	1	2	3	4	5	6	7	8	Final
New Brunswick (Fitzgerald)	0	4	2	0	0	1	0	0	7
Manitoba (Thiessen)	2	0	0	1	3	0	2	2	10

=== Draw 6 ===
Thursday, May 1, 10:00

Sheet A	1	2	3	4	5	6	7	8	EE	Final
New Brunswick (Fitzgerald)	0	0	1	0	4	0	0	1	2	8
Northern Ontario (Sonego)	1	1	0	1	0	2	1	0	0	6

Sheet B	1	2	3	4	5	6	7	8	Final
Nova Scotia (Horning)	0	1	0	3	0	2	0	X	6
British Columbia (Neighbour)	4	0	3	0	3	0	1	X	11

Sheet C	1	2	3	4	5	6	7	8	Final
Newfoundland and Labrador (MacDonald)	0	0	0	0	4	1	1	0	6
Alberta (Smart)	3	1	1	3	0	0	0	1	9

Sheet D	1	2	3	4	5	6	7	8	Final
Ontario (Munro)	0	1	2	0	0	0	X	X	3
Manitoba (Thiessen)	4	0	0	4	3	1	X	X	12

Sheet E	1	2	3	4	5	6	7	8	Final
Saskatchewan (Bender)	0	0	0	0	0	0	2	X	2
Quebec (Lessard)	1	1	1	1	1	3	0	X	8

=== Draw 7 ===
Thursday, May 1, 15:00

Sheet A	1	2	3	4	5	6	7	8	Final
Ontario (Munro)	2	1	0	0	1	0	5	X	9
Nova Scotia (Horning)	0	0	3	1	0	1	0	X	5

Sheet B	1	2	3	4	5	6	7	8	Final
Newfoundland and Labrador (MacDonald)	0	0	2	0	0	2	0	X	4
Manitoba (Thiessen)	4	4	0	3	1	0	0	X	12

Sheet C	1	2	3	4	5	6	7	8	EE	Final
Saskatchewan (Bender)	2	0	0	0	2	0	3	0	1	8
New Brunswick (Fitzgerald)	0	1	1	2	0	2	0	1	0	7

Sheet D	1	2	3	4	5	6	7	8	Final
British Columbia (Neighbour)	0	0	1	0	0	0	2	X	3
Quebec (Lessard)	1	1	0	1	2	6	0	X	11

Sheet E	1	2	3	4	5	6	7	8	Final
Alberta (Smart)	0	0	0	2	1	0	1	X	4
Northern Ontario (Sonego)	3	1	1	0	0	1	0	X	6

=== Draw 8 ===
Friday, May 2, 10:00

Sheet A	1	2	3	4	5	6	7	8	Final
Quebec (Lessard)	0	2	0	1	0	1	0	1	5
Manitoba (Thiessen)	1	0	1	0	1	0	1	0	4

Sheet B	1	2	3	4	5	6	7	8	Final
Northern Ontario (Sonego)	2	0	0	0	0	0	3	X	5
Saskatchewan (Bender)	0	0	5	1	0	2	0	X	8

Sheet C	1	2	3	4	5	6	7	8	EE	Final
Ontario (Munro)	0	2	0	2	1	0	0	2	2	9
British Columbia (Neighbour)	2	0	2	0	0	1	2	0	0	7

Sheet D	1	2	3	4	5	6	7	8	Final
Alberta (Smart)	2	0	1	0	2	5	2	X	12
Nova Scotia (Horning)	0	1	0	2	0	0	0	X	3

Sheet E	1	2	3	4	5	6	7	8	EE	Final
Newfoundland and Labrador (MacDonald)	0	0	1	0	2	1	2	0	0	6
New Brunswick (Fitzgerald)	1	2	0	1	0	0	0	2	1	7

=== Draw 9 ===
Friday, May 2, 15:00

Sheet A	1	2	3	4	5	6	7	8	Final
Northern Ontario (Sonego)	0	1	0	0	4	0	0	X	5
British Columbia (Neighbour)	1	0	1	3	0	5	0	X	10

Sheet B	1	2	3	4	5	6	7	8	Final
Alberta (Smart)	1	4	1	2	0	1	X	X	9
New Brunswick (Fitzgerald)	0	0	0	0	1	0	X	X	1

Sheet C	1	2	3	4	5	6	7	8	EE	Final
Manitoba (Thiessen)	0	1	0	0	3	0	2	1	2	9
Nova Scotia (Horning)	1	0	3	2	0	1	0	0	0	7

Sheet D	1	2	3	4	5	6	7	8	Final
Saskatchewan (Bender)	0	1	0	1	1	1	1	0	5
Newfoundland and Labrador (MacDonald)	2	0	2	0	0	0	0	3	7

Sheet E	1	2	3	4	5	6	7	8	Final
Quebec (Lessard)	0	1	0	0	0	3	1	1	6
Ontario (Munro)	1	0	1	2	1	0	0	0	5

== Tiebreakers ==
Friday, May 2, 20:00

Team	1	2	3	4	5	6	7	8	Final
Manitoba (Thiessen)	1	0	1	2	1	1	0	0	6
Saskatchewan (Bender)	0	2	0	0	0	0	1	2	5

Team	1	2	3	4	5	6	7	8	EE	Final
Alberta (Smart)	0	2	0	2	0	1	2	2	1	10
British Columbia (Neighbour)	1	0	5	0	3	0	0	0	0	9

== Playoffs ==
Page playoff system
1	Quebec	6
2	Ontario	2
3	Manitoba	8
4	Alberta	7

Semifinal
2	Ontario	3
3	Manitoba	8

Gold Medal Game
1	Quebec	5
3	Manitoba	8

=== 1 vs. 2 ===
Saturday, May 3, 14:00

Sheet C	1	2	3	4	5	6	7	8	Final
Quebec (Lessard)	1	0	1	3	1	0	0	X	6
Ontario (Munro)	0	0	0	0	0	1	1	X	2

=== 3 vs. 4 ===
Saturday, May 3, 18:00

Sheet C	1	2	3	4	5	6	7	8	Final
Manitoba (Thiessen)	2	1	0	0	4	0	0	1	8
Alberta (Smart)	0	0	1	1	0	2	3	0	7

=== Semifinal ===
Sunday, May 4, 10:00

Sheet C	1	2	3	4	5	6	7	8	Final
Ontario (Munro)	1	0	1	0	0	0	1	X	3
Manitoba (Thiessen)	0	1	0	2	4	1	0	X	8

=== Gold medal game ===
Sunday, May 4, 14:30

Sheet C	1	2	3	4	5	6	7	8	Final
Quebec (Lessard)	2	0	0	0	0	3	0	X	5
Manitoba (Thiessen)	0	2	1	2	2	0	1	X	8
