= Rob Bucholz =

Canadian curler

- Curler
- Born: August 16, 1961 (age 65); Edmonton, Alberta

Team
- Curling club: Saville Community SC, Edmonton, AB

Rob Arnold Bucholz (born August 16, 1961) is a Canadian curler.

Bucholz has been a competitive curler in the Edmonton area since the 1980s. He skipped his own team until joining forces with Mark Johnson in 2004. That rink lost to Kevin Martin in the 2006 Alberta championship, the closest Bucholz has been from making it to the Brier.

Bucholz has played in many World Curling Tour events. He won the Twin Anchors Invitational in 2002.

Bucholz retired from competitive curling in 2008. However, he returned in 2011 to play with his sons, Landon and Bryce (and third Evan Asmussen) at the 2011 The Shoot-Out. They were without a skip, so Bucholz stepped in at the last minute, and led the team to the final where they lost to Randy Ferbey.
