= Zhang Rongrui =

Chinese curler

- Curler
- Born: 8 March 1996 (age 30)

Curling career
- Member Association: China
- World Championship: 1 (2015)
- Other appearances: World Junior Championships: 2 (2011, 2013)

Zhang Rongrui (born March 8, 1996) is a Chinese curler. He competed at the 2015 Ford World Men's Curling Championship in Halifax, Nova Scotia, Canada, as alternate for the Chinese team, which placed 8th in the tournament.
