= Grant Dezura =

Canadian curler

Grant Dezura (born October 20, 1973) is a Canadian curler from Maple Ridge, British Columbia.

As a junior curler, Dezura won two provincial championships, in 1991 and 1992. He skipped Team British Columbia at both the 1991 and 1992 Canadian Junior Curling Championships. In 1991, after posting an 8-3 round robin record, he led his B.C. rink to a semifinal loss to Northern Ontario's Jason Repay. In 1992, he had less success, leading B.C. to a 4-7 record.

Dezura won a provincial mixed championship in 1998, with future wife Diane Nelson, and teammates Bill Fisher and Sue Allen. The team went 6-5 at the 1998 Canadian Mixed Curling Championship, losing in a tiebreaker.

In men's play, Dezura has played for a number of different rinks including Jim Armstrong, Brian Gessner, Greg McAulay, Greg Folk, Jay Peachey, Sean Geall and Brent Pierce, as well as skipping his own teams from 1997-1999, 2000–01, 2003–06 and since 2013. On the World Curling Tour, he has won the 2011 Wainwright Roaming Buffalo Classic, the 2012 Cloverdale Cash Spiel, the 2012 Valley First Crown of Curling (playing lead for Pierce in all three), the 2013 Kamloops Crown of Curling and the 2014 Cloverdale Cash Spiel.

== Personal life ==
Dezura is married to Olympic bronze medalist Diane Dezura, they have two kids named Ashley Ann Dezura and Wally Dezura. He is a business owner with Coronation Business Group.
