= Kalia Van Osch =

Canadian curler

- Curler
- Born: October 8, 1993 (age 33); Nanaimo, British Columbia, Canada

Team
- Curling club: Nanaimo CC, Nanaimo, BC
- Skip: Kesa Van Osch
- Third: Kalia Van Osch
- Second: Marika Van Osch
- Lead: Amy Gibson
- Alternate: Rachelle Kallechy

Curling career
- Hearts: 1 (2018)
Medal record
Women's curling
Representing British Columbia
Canadian Junior Curling Championships
| Silver medal – second place | 2014 Liverpool |
| Bronze medal – third place | 2012 Napanee |

Kalia Van Osch (born October 8, 1993) is a Canadian curler from Parksville, British Columbia. She skipped for British Columbia at the 2014 Canadian Junior Curling Championships to place second.

Van Osch also represented British Columbia playing third for her sister Kesa Van Osch at the 2012 Canadian Junior Curling Championships where she led her team to a third-place finish.
