= 2012 Wainwright Roaming Buffalo Classic =

World Curling Tour event

- Host city: Wainwright, Alberta
- Arena: Wainwright Curling Club
- Dates: November 16–19
- Winner: (Washington (state)) Mark Johnson
- Curling club: Granite CC, Seattle
- Skip: Mark Johnson
- Third: Jason Larway
- Second: Joel Larway
- Lead: Christopher Rimple
- Finalist: (Alberta) Jamie King

The 2012 Wainwright Roaming Buffalo Classic was held from November 16 to 19 at the Wainwright Curling Club in Wainwright, Alberta as part of the 2012–13 World Curling Tour. The event was held in a triple knockout format, and the purse for the event was CAD$55,000. In the final, Mark Johnson's Seattle, Washington rink defeated Jamie King of Alberta with a score of 4–3 and won his third title at the Wainwright Roaming Buffalo Classic.

== Teams ==
The teams are listed as follows:

Skip	Third	Second	Lead	Locale
Tom Appelman	Brent Bawel	Ted Appelman	Brendan Melnyk	Edmonton, Alberta
Matthew Blandford	Evan Asmussen	Brent Hamilton	Brad Chyz	Calgary, Alberta
Brendan Bottcher	Micky Lizmore	Bradley Thiessen	Karrick Martin	Edmonton, Alberta
Dean Davidson				Wainwright, Alberta
Shawn Donnelly	Kendall Warawa	Curtis Der	Neal Woloschuk	Edmonton, Alberta
Scott Egger	Albert Gerdung	Darren Grierson	Robin Niebergall	Brooks, Alberta
Christopher Plys (fourth)	Tyler George (skip)	Rich Ruohonen	Colin Hufman	Duluth, Minnesota
Drew Heidt		Regis Neumeier	Shayne Hannon	Kindersley, Saskatchewan
Josh Heidt	Brock Montgomery	Matt Lang	Dustin Kidby	Kerrobert, Saskatchewan
Clint Dieno (fourth)	Jason Jacobson (skip)	Matt Froehlich	Chadd McKenzie	Saskatoon, Saskatchewan
Mark Johnson	Jason Larway	Joel Larway	Christopher Rimple	(Washington (state)) Seattle, Washington
Joel Jordison	Jason Ackerman	Brent Goeres	Curtis Horwath	Moose Jaw, Saskatchewan
Glen Kennedy	Nathan Connolly	Brandon Klassen	Parker Konschuh	Edmonton, Alberta
Jamie King	Blake MacDonald	Scott Pfeifer	Jeff Erickson	Edmonton, Alberta
Derek Miller	Adam Enright	Dustin Eckstrand	Matt Enright	Camrose, Alberta
Brent Pierce	Jeff Richard	Kevin Recksiedler	Grant Dezura	New Westminster, British Columbia
Jeremy Roe	Steve Day	Richard Maskel	Mark Hartman	Madison, Wisconsin
Robert Schlender	Dean Ross	Don Bartlett	Chris Lemishka	Edmonton, Alberta
Thomas Scoffin	Dylan Gousseau	Landon Bucholz	Bryce Bucholz	Edmonton, Alberta
Colin Tanton				Edmonton, Alberta
Charley Thomas	J. D. Lind	Dominic Daemen	Matthew Ng	Calgary, Alberta
Murray Westman				Wainwright, Alberta
Wade White	Kevin Tym	Dan Holowaychuk	George White	Edmonton, Alberta
Jeremy Hodges (fourth)	Matt Willerton (skip)	Craig MacAlpine	Chris Evernden	Edmonton, Alberta

== Knockout results ==
The draw is listed as follows:

=== A event ===
First Knockout		Semifinals		Qualifier 1
(Washington (state)) Mark Johnson	4
(Alberta) Murray Westman	1	(Washington (state)) Mark Johnson	9
(Alberta) Matthew Blandford	4	(Alberta) Matthew Blandford	1
(Alberta) Warren Cross	1			(Washington (state)) Mark Johnson	5
(Saskatchewan) Jason Jacobson	4			(Alberta) Thomas Scoffin	4
(Alberta) Thomas Scoffin	5	(Alberta) Thomas Scoffin	5
(British Columbia) Brent Pierce	4	(Alberta) Dean Davidson	4
(Alberta) Dean Davidson	6

First Knockout		Semifinals		Qualifier 2
(Saskatchewan) Joel Jordison	8
(Alberta) Colin Tanton	5	(Saskatchewan) Joel Jordison	5
(Alberta) Jamie King	8	(Alberta) Jamie King	6
(Alberta) Scott Egger	3			(Alberta) Jamie King	6
(Alberta) Wade White	5			(Saskatchewan) Josh Heidt	5
(Saskatchewan) Josh Heidt	6	(Saskatchewan) Josh Heidt	6
(Alberta) Charley Thomas	1	(Minnesota) Tyler George	5
(Minnesota) Tyler George	5

First Knockout		Semifinals		Qualifier 3
(Wisconsin) Jeremy Roe	8
(Alberta) Glen Kennedy	5	(Wisconsin) Jeremy Roe	3
(Alberta) Brendan Bottcher	4	(Alberta) Brendan Bottcher	8
(Saskatchewan) Drew Heidt	1			(Alberta) Brendan Bottcher	3
(Alberta) Matt Willerton	5			(Alberta) Robert Schlender	2
(Alberta) Robert Schlender	6	(Alberta) Robert Schlender	6
(Alberta) Tom Appelman	7	(Alberta) Tom Appelman	5
(Alberta) Shawn Donnelly	4

=== B event ===
Second Knockout
(Alberta) Murray Westman	6
(Alberta) Warren Cross	7
(Saskatchewan) Jason Jacobson	2
(British Columbia) Brent Pierce	8

Quarterfinals
(Wisconsin) Jeremy Roe	6
(Alberta) Warren Cross	7
(Alberta) Tom Appelman	4
(British Columbia) Brent Pierce	7

Semifinals
(Alberta) Warren Cross	2
(British Columbia) Brent Pierce	7

Qualifier 4
(British Columbia) Brent Pierce	5
(Saskatchewan) Josh Heidt	4

Second Knockout
(Alberta) Colin Tanton	4
(Alberta) Scott Egger	7
(Alberta) Wade White	5
(Alberta) Charley Thomas	8

Quarterfinals
(Alberta) Matthew Blandford	6
(Alberta) Scott Egger	9
(Alberta) Dean Davidson	4
(Alberta) Charley Thomas	9

Semifinals
(Alberta) Scott Egger	5
(Alberta) Charley Thomas	6

Qualifier 5
(Alberta) Charley Thomas	9
(Alberta) Robert Schlender	5

Second Knockout
(Alberta) Glen Kennedy	5
(Saskatchewan) Drew Heidt	6
(Alberta) Matt Willerton	6
(Alberta) Shawn Donnelly	7

Quarterfinals
(Saskatchewan) Joel Jordison	5
(Saskatchewan) Drew Heidt	6
(Minnesota) Tyler George	3
(Alberta) Shawn Donnelly	9

Semifinals
(Saskatchewan) Drew Heidt	2
(Alberta) Shawn Donnelly	5

Qualifier 6
(Alberta) Shawn Donnelly	7
(Alberta) Thomas Scoffin	1

=== C event ===
Third Knockout
(Alberta) Matthew Blandford	1
(Alberta) Dean Davidson	6
(Saskatchewan) Joel Jordison	8
(Minnesota) Tyler George	6

Quarterfinals
(Wisconsin) Jeremy Roe	1
(Alberta) Tom Appelman	7
(Alberta) Dean Davidson	1
(Saskatchewan) Drew Heidt	6
(Alberta) Warren Cross	7
(Saskatchewan) Joel Jordison	10

Semifinals
(Alberta) Tom Appelman	9
(Saskatchewan) Drew Heidt	2
(Saskatchewan) Joel Jordison	6
(Alberta) Robert Schlender	1

Qualifier 7
(Alberta) Tom Appelman	3
(Saskatchewan) Joel Jordison	2

Third Knockout
(Alberta) Murray Westman	2
(Saskatchewan) Jason Jacobson	9
(Alberta) Colin Tanton	5
(Alberta) Wade White	7
(Alberta) Glen Kennedy	2
(Alberta) Matt Willerton	8

Quarterfinals
(Saskatchewan) Jason Jacobson	6
(Alberta) Scott Egger	5
(Alberta) Wade White	8
(Alberta) Matt Willerton	4

Semifinals
(Alberta) Thomas Scoffin	2
(Saskatchewan) Jason Jacobson	5
(Saskatchewan) Josh Heidt	6
(Alberta) Wade White	2

Qualifier 8
(Saskatchewan) Jason Jacobson	6
(Saskatchewan) Josh Heidt	1

== Playoffs ==
Quarterfinals
(Washington (state)) Mark Johnson	5
(Saskatchewan) Jason Jacobson	2
(British Columbia) Brent Pierce	4
(Alberta) Charley Thomas	7
(Alberta) Shawn Donnelly	4
(Alberta) Brendan Bottcher	5
(Alberta) Tom Appelman	0
(Alberta) Jamie King	6

Semifinals
(Washington (state)) Mark Johnson	7
(Alberta) Charley Thomas	2
(Alberta) Brendan Bottcher	7
(Alberta) Jamie King	8

Final
(Washington (state)) Mark Johnson	4
(Alberta) Jamie King	3
