= 2013 Boston Pizza Cup – Qualification =

Curling competition qualification

Qualification for the 2013 Boston Pizza Cup consisted of both direct and indirect qualification. The defending champion and the highest-ranked team on the Canadian Team Ranking System qualified directly, as do two teams from the Alberta Curling Federation based on their performance on the ̇World Curling Tour. Eight more teams qualified through qualification events hosted by the constituent associations of the Alberta Curling Federation.

== Summary ==
Qualification method	Berths	Qualifying team
Defending champion from previous year	1	Kevin Koe
Highest-ranked team on CTRS not already qualified	1	Kevin Martin
Alberta Curling Federation bonspiel points	2	Brendan Bottcher; Jamie King
Peace Curling Association qualifier (Jan. 4–6)	2	Kurt Balderston; Graham Powell
Northern Alberta Curling Association qualifier (Jan. 17–20)	3	Tom Appelman; Wade White; James Pahl
Southern Alberta Curling Association qualifier (Jan. 18–21)	3	Charley Thomas; Matthew Blandford; Aaron Sluchinski

== Qualification events ==
=== Peace Curling Association ===
The Peace Curling Association qualifier was held from January 4 to 6 at the Dawson Creek Curling Club in Dawson Creek, British Columbia. The qualifier was held as a double knockout tournament, with the winners of the tournament qualifying to the provincials. Kurt Balderston and Graham Powell qualified their teams to the provincials.

==== Results ====
The draw is listed as follows:

===== A Event =====
First Knockout
Mark Pillsworth	4
Kurt Balderston	9

Quarterfinals
Kurt Balderston	7
Ryan Konowalyk	0
Glen Godberson	3
Mark Heartt	9
Cliff Kostiuck	7
Mark Zahacy	10
Jeff Ginter	3
Graham Powell	11

Semifinals
Kurt Balderston	7
Mark Heartt	6
Mark Zahacy	3
Graham Powell	7

Qualifier 1
Kurt Balderston	8
Graham Powell	6

===== B Event =====
Second Knockout
Jeff Ginter	11
Cliff Kostiuck	4

Quarterfinals
Mark Pillsworth	1
Glen Godberson	9
Jeff Ginter	2
Ryan Konowalyk	11

Semifinals
Mark Zahacy	2
Glen Godberson	8
Ryan Konowalyk	8
Mark Heartt	2

To Qualifier 2
Glen Godberson	4
Ryan Konowalyk	9
Qualifier 2
Graham Powell	6
Ryan Konowalyk	4

=== Northern Alberta Curling Association ===
The Northern Alberta Curling Association qualifier was held from January 17 to 20 at the Ottewell Curling Club in Edmonton.

==== Teams ====
The teams are listed as follows:

Skip	Third	Second	Lead	Locale
Barry Chwedoruk	Eric Richard	Doug Webster	Lance Palamaruk	Lac La Biche Curling Club, Lac La Biche
Curtis Harrish	Brian Kushinski	Tyler Wasieczko	Dan Munroe	Calmar Curling Club, Calmar
Douglas McLeod	Richard Guidinger	Jeffrey Smith	Lyle Biever	Spruce Grove Curling Club, Spruce Grove
Glen Kennedy	Nathan Connolly	Brandon Klassen	Parker Konschuh	Crestwood Curling Club, Edmonton
James Pahl	Mark Klinck	Kevin McGregor	Kelly Mauthe	Strathcona Curling Club, Sherwood Park
Jessi Wilkinson	Tyler Pfeiffer	Keith Power	Carlo Tarantino	Saville Sports Centre, Edmonton
Kyle Richard	Matt Yeo	Neil Bratrud	Colin Huber	Gibbons Curling Club, Gibbons
Lee Hodgson	Gord Graves	Gary Craig	Mark Deschiffart	Lacombe Curling Club, Lacombe
Matt Willerton	Jeremy Hodges	Craig MacAlpine	Chris Evernden	Saville Sports Centre, Edmonton
Mike Hutchings	Brian McPherson	Cgris King	Derek Skarban	Morinville Curling Club, Morinville
Randy Guidinger	Randy Detillieux	Brian Truckey	Dale Rusnak	Spruce Grove Curling Club, Spruce Grove
Robert Schlender	Dean Ross	Chris Lemishka	Julian Sawiak	Avonair Curling Club, Edmonton
Thomas Stroh	Cory Wilson	Kirk Clifford	Jared Mouille	Strathcona Curling Club, Sherwood Park
Tom Appelman	Brent Bawel	Ted Appelman	Brendan Melnyk	Saville Sports Centre, Edmonton
Vic Rocque	Aaron Bartling	Gerald Looy	Norm Hempel	Bonnyville Curling Club, Bonnyville
Wade White	Kevin Tym	Dan Holowaychuk	George White	Saville Sports Centre, Edmonton

==== Results ====
===== A Event =====
First Knockout
Robert Schlender	7
Lee Hodgson	4
Kyle Richard	1
Jessi Wilkinson	7
Glen Kennedy	6
Thomas Stroh	5
Mike Hutchings	7
Matt Willerton	6
Tom Appelman	8
Barry Chwedoruk	4
Randy Guidinger	3
Douglas McLeod	6
Wade White	9
Curtis Harrish	4
James Pahl	10
Vic Rocque	5

Quarterfinals
Robert Schlender	5
Jessi Wilkinson	2
Glen Kennedy	4
Mike Hutchings	7
Tom Appelman	6
Douglas McLeod	3
Wade White	8
James Pahl	5

Semifinals
Robert Schlender	5
Mike Hutchings	9
Tom Appelman	9
Wade White	2

Qualifier 1
Mike Hutchings	0
Tom Appelman	8

===== B Event =====
Second Knockout
Lee Hodgson	3
Kyle Richard	8
Barry Chwedoruk	8
Randy Guidinger	5

Quarterfinals
James Pahl	9
Kyle Richard	0
Glen Kennedy	0
Barry Chwedoruk	9

Semifinals
James Pahl	7
Barry Chwedoruk	4

To Qualifier 2
Mike Hutchings	5
James Pahl	7
Qualifier 2
James Pahl	3
Wade White	7

Second Knockout
Curtis Harrish	4
Vic Rocque	9
Thomas Stroh	4
Matt Willerton	8

Quarterfinals
Douglas McLeod	8
Vic Rocque	6
Jessi Wilkinson	5
Matt Willerton	8

Semifinals
Robert Schlender	2
Douglas McLeod	7
Wade White	7
Matt Willerton	3

Qualifier 2
Douglas McLeod	6
Wade White	7

===== C Event =====
Third Knockout
Kyle Richard	8
Glen Kennedy	6

Quarterfinals
Vic Rocque	3
Jessi Wilkinson	10
Robert Schlender	7
Kyle Richard	1

Semifinals
Jessi Wilkinson	6
Robert Schlender	0

To Qualifier 3
Jessi Wilkinson	4
James Pahl	5
Qualifier 3
James Pahl	8
Mike Hutchings	6

Third Knockout
Lee Hodgson	6
Randy Guidinger	7
Barry Chwedoruk	6
Curtis Harrish	9

Quarterfinals
Matt Willerton	4
Randy Guidinger	6
Curtis Harrish	9
Thomas Stroh	5

Semifinals
Mike Hutchings	6
Randy Guidinger	0
Curtis Harrish	9
Douglas McLeod	5

To Qualifier 3
Mike Hutchings	7
Curtis Harrish	5

=== Southern Alberta Curling Association ===
The Southern Alberta Curling Association qualifier was held from January 18 to 21 at the Brooks Curling Club in Brooks.

==== Teams ====
Skip	Locale
Charley Thomas	Glencoe Curling Club, Calgary
Steve Petryk	Calgary Curling Club, Calgary
Darren Moulding	Red Deer Curling Centre, Red Deer
Matthew Blandford	Inglewood Golf & Curling Club, Calgary
Aaron Sluchinski	Airdrie Curling Club, Airdrie
Sean O'Connor	Calgary Curling Club, Calgary
Josh Lambden	Airdrie Curling Club, Airdrie
John Stroh	Medicine Hat Curling Club, Medicine Hat
Bert Martin	Airdrie Curling Club, Airdrie
Paul Gowsell	Calgary Winter Club, Calgary
Kevin Yablonski	Calgary Winter Club, Calgary
Scott Egger	Brooks Curling Club, Brooks
Trevor Funk	Medicine Hat Curling Club, Medicine Hat
Jon Rennie	Calgary Curling Club, Calgary
Cam Culp	Airdrie Curling Club, Airdrie
Sterling Hansen	North Hill Club, Calgary

==== Results ====
The draw is listed as follows:

===== A Event =====
First Knockout
Charley Thomas	8
Trevor Funk	2
Sean O'Connor	4
Kevin Yablonski	10
Scott Egger	5
Aaron Sluchinski	7
Cam Culp	7
Darren Moulding	8
Matthew Blandford	11
Sterling Hansen	3
Josh Lambden	7
Bert Martin	5
Paul Gowsell	4
John Stroh	8
Jon Rennie	1
Steve Petryk	7

Quarterfinals
Charley Thomas	6
Kevin Yablonski	0
Aaron Sluchinski	6
Darren Moulding	0
Matthew Blandford	8
Josh Lambden	5
John Stroh	6
Steve Petryk	7

Semifinals
Charley Thomas	7
Aaron Sluchinski	2
Matthew Blandford	7
Steve Petryk	6

Qualifier 1
Charley Thomas	9
Matthew Blandford	1

===== B Event =====
Second Knockout
Trevor Funk	1
Sean O'Connor	9
Scott Egger	7
Cam Culp	1

Quarterfinals
Darren Moulding	8
Sean O'Connor	6
John Stroh	8
Scott Egger	5

Semifinals
Darren Moulding	5
Steve Petryk	7
John Stroh	6
Aaron Sluchinski	7

To Qualifier 2
Steve Petryk	7
Aaron Sluchinski	5
Qualifier 2
Steve Petryk	5
Matthew Blandford	8

Second Knockout
Sterling Hansen	5
Bert Martin	9
Paul Gowsell	8
Jon Rennie	2

Quarterfinals
Kevin Yablonski	7
Bert Martin	6
Josh Lambden	4
Paul Gowsell	8

Semifinals
Kevin Yablonski	3
Paul Gowsell	11

To Qualifier 2
Paul Gowsell	2
Matthew Blandford	7

===== C Event =====
Third Knockout
Jon Rennie	10
Sean O'Connor	8

Quarterfinals
Bert Martin	7
Josh Lambden	5
Jon Rennie	7
John Stroh	8

Semifinals
Aaron Sluchinski	8
Bert Martin	2
Paul Gowsell	7
John Stroh	6

To Qualifier 3
Aaron Sluchinski	7
Paul Gowsell	6
Qualifier 3
Aaron Sluchinski	8
Steve Petryk	5

Third Knockout
Trevor Funk	7
Scott Egger	8
Cam Culp	1
Sterling Hansen	7

Quarterfinals
Scott Egger	8
Kevin Yablonski	3
Sterling Hansen	7
Darren Moulding	4

Semifinals
Scott Egger	9
Sterling Hansen	7

To Qualifier 3
Steve Petryk	6
Scott Egger	3
