= 2014 Boston Pizza Cup =

- Host city: Lacombe, Alberta
- Arena: Lacombe Curling Club
- Dates: February 5–9
- Winner: Kevin Koe
- Curling club: Glencoe CC, Calgary
- Skip: Kevin Koe
- Third: Pat Simmons
- Second: Carter Rycroft
- Lead: Nolan Thiessen
- Finalist: Kevin Martin

The 2014 Boston Pizza Cup, the provincial men's curling championship for Alberta, was held from February 5 to 9 at the Lacombe Curling Club in Lacombe, Alberta. The winner represented Alberta at the 2014 Tim Hortons Brier in Kamloops.

== Qualification process ==
Twelve teams qualified for the provincial tournament through several methods. The qualification process is as follows:

| Qualification method | Berths | Qualifying team |
|---|---|---|
| Defending champion from previous year | 1 | Kevin Martin |
| Highest-ranked team on CTRS not already qualified | 1 | Kevin Koe |
| Alberta Curling Federation bonspiel points | 2 | Robert Schlender; Jamie King |
| Peace Curling Association qualifier (Jan. 17–19) | 2 | Greg Pasichnuk; Mark Johnson |
| Northern Alberta Curling Association qualifier (Jan. 17–19) | 3 | Brendan Bottcher; Wade White; Ted Appelman |
| Southern Alberta Curling Association qualifier (Jan. 17–20) | 3 | Lloyd Hill; Matthew Blandford; Charley Thomas |

== Teams ==
| Skip | Third | Second | Lead | Alternate | Locale(s) |
|---|---|---|---|---|---|
| Ted Appelman | Shawn Donnelly | Landon Bucholz | Bryce Bucholz | | Saville Sports Centre, Edmonton |
| Matthew Blandford | Darren Moulding | Brent Hamilton | Brad Chyz | | Inglewood Curling Club, Calgary |
| Brendan Bottcher | Micky Lizmore | Bradley Thiessen | Karrick Martin | | Saville Sports Centre, Edmonton |
| Lloyd Hill | Scott Egger | Greg Hill | Maurice Sonier | | Calgary Curling Club, Calgary |
| Mark Johnson | Kurt Balderston | Rob Bucholz | Del Shaughnessy | | Grande Prairie Curling Club, Grande Prairie |
| Jamie King | Blake MacDonald | Scott Pfeifer | Jeff Erickson | | St. Albert Curling Club, St. Albert |
| Kevin Koe | Pat Simmons | Carter Rycroft | Nolan Thiessen | | Glencoe Curling Club, Calgary |
| Kevin Martin | David Nedohin | Marc Kennedy | Ben Hebert | | Saville Sports Centre, Edmonton |
| Rob Maksymetz (fourth) | Evan Asmussen | Sean Morris | Greg Pasichnuk (skip) | | Manning Curling Club, Manning |
| Robert Schlender | Aaron Sluchinski | Justin Sluchinski | Dylan Webster | | Airdrie Curling Club, Airdrie |
| Charley Thomas | Colin Hodgson | Matthew Ng | Mike Westlund | | Calgary Curling Club, Calgary; Glencoe Curling Club, Calgary |
| Wade White | Kevin Tym | Dan Holowaychuk | George White | | Saville Sports Centre, Edmonton |

== Knockout Draw Brackets ==
=== A Event ===
First Knockout
Matthew Blandford | 6
Charley Thomas | 4
Robert Schlender | 7
Greg Pasichnuk | 5
Mark Johnson | 7
Lloyd Hill | 2
Wade White | 10
Ted Appelman | 4

Quarterfinals
Kevin Martin | 5
Matthew Blandford | 4
Robert Schlender | 2
Brendan Bottcher | 6
Jamie King | 6
Mark Johnson | 5
Wade White | 12
Kevin Koe | 6

Semifinals
Kevin Martin | 10
Brendan Bottcher | 8
Jamie King | 7
Wade White | 4

Qualifier 1
Kevin Martin | 7
Jamie King | 3

=== B Event ===
Second Knockout
Robert Schlender | 6
Charley Thomas | 10
Mark Johnson | 7
Greg Pasichnuk | 6
Kevin Koe | 8
Lloyd Hill | 2
Matthew Blandford | 11
Ted Appelman | 4

Quarterfinals
Charley Thomas | 8
Wade White | 7
Mark Johnson | 7
Brendan Bottcher | 6
Kevin Koe | 2
Matthew Blandford | 4

Semifinals
Charley Thomas | 6
Mark Johnson | 3
Matthew Blandford | 7
Jamie King | 5

Qualifier 2
Charley Thomas | 6
Matthew Blandford | 8

=== C Event ===
| Third Knockout | | Semifinals | | Qualifier 3 |
| | | Robert Schlender | 11 |
| Robert Schlender | 9 | Jamie King | 6 |
| Greg Pasichnuk | 3 | | | Robert Schlender | 4 |
| | | | | Kevin Koe | 7 |
| | | Kevin Koe | 7 |
| | | Mark Johnson | 3 |

| Third Knockout | | Semifinals | | Qualifier 4 |
| Wade White | 9 |
| Lloyd Hill | 2 | Wade White | 5 |
| Brendan Bottcher | 4 | Ted Appelman | 10 |
| Ted Appelman | 6 | | | Ted Appelman | 2 |
| | | | | Charley Thomas | 7 |

== Results ==
All draws are listed in Mountain Standard Time (UTC−7).

=== Draw 1 ===
Wednesday, February 5, 9:30 am

| Sheet A | 1 | 2 | 3 | 4 | 5 | 6 | 7 | 8 | 9 | 10 | Final |
|---|---|---|---|---|---|---|---|---|---|---|---|
| Mark Johnson 🔨 | 0 | 1 | 0 | 0 | 2 | 2 | 1 | 0 | 1 | X | 7 |
| Lloyd Hill | 0 | 0 | 0 | 1 | 0 | 0 | 0 | 1 | 0 | X | 2 |

| Sheet B | 1 | 2 | 3 | 4 | 5 | 6 | 7 | 8 | 9 | 10 | 11 | Final |
|---|---|---|---|---|---|---|---|---|---|---|---|---|
| Robert Schlender 🔨 | 0 | 1 | 0 | 1 | 0 | 0 | 2 | 0 | 0 | 1 | 2 | 7 |
| Greg Pasichnuk | 0 | 0 | 2 | 0 | 0 | 1 | 0 | 2 | 0 | 0 | 0 | 5 |

| Sheet C | 1 | 2 | 3 | 4 | 5 | 6 | 7 | 8 | 9 | 10 | Final |
|---|---|---|---|---|---|---|---|---|---|---|---|
| Matthew Blandford 🔨 | 1 | 2 | 0 | 0 | 0 | 0 | 2 | 0 | 1 | 0 | 6 |
| Charley Thomas | 0 | 0 | 0 | 1 | 0 | 1 | 0 | 1 | 0 | 1 | 4 |

| Sheet D | 1 | 2 | 3 | 4 | 5 | 6 | 7 | 8 | 9 | 10 | Final |
|---|---|---|---|---|---|---|---|---|---|---|---|
| Wade White | 2 | 2 | 0 | 2 | 0 | 4 | X | X | X | X | 10 |
| Ted Appelman 🔨 | 0 | 0 | 2 | 0 | 2 | 0 | X | X | X | X | 4 |

=== Draw 2 ===
Wednesday, February 5, 6:30 pm

| Sheet A | 1 | 2 | 3 | 4 | 5 | 6 | 7 | 8 | 9 | 10 | Final |
|---|---|---|---|---|---|---|---|---|---|---|---|
| Robert Schlender 🔨 | 0 | 1 | 0 | 0 | 1 | 0 | 0 | 0 | X | X | 2 |
| Brendan Bottcher | 0 | 0 | 1 | 2 | 0 | 0 | 1 | 2 | X | X | 6 |

| Sheet B | 1 | 2 | 3 | 4 | 5 | 6 | 7 | 8 | 9 | 10 | Final |
|---|---|---|---|---|---|---|---|---|---|---|---|
| Kevin Martin 🔨 | 0 | 1 | 0 | 0 | 2 | 0 | 0 | 1 | 0 | 1 | 5 |
| Matthew Blandford | 0 | 0 | 0 | 2 | 0 | 1 | 0 | 0 | 1 | 0 | 4 |

| Sheet C | 1 | 2 | 3 | 4 | 5 | 6 | 7 | 8 | 9 | 10 | Final |
|---|---|---|---|---|---|---|---|---|---|---|---|
| Wade White 🔨 | 0 | 0 | 2 | 0 | 3 | 1 | 0 | 4 | 2 | X | 12 |
| Kevin Koe | 1 | 1 | 0 | 2 | 0 | 0 | 2 | 0 | 0 | X | 6 |

| Sheet D | 1 | 2 | 3 | 4 | 5 | 6 | 7 | 8 | 9 | 10 | 11 | Final |
|---|---|---|---|---|---|---|---|---|---|---|---|---|
| Jamie King | 0 | 1 | 0 | 0 | 2 | 1 | 0 | 0 | 1 | 0 | 1 | 6 |
| Mark Johnson | 2 | 0 | 0 | 1 | 0 | 0 | 0 | 0 | 0 | 2 | 0 | 5 |

=== Draw 3 ===
Thursday, February 6, 9:00 am

| Sheet B | 1 | 2 | 3 | 4 | 5 | 6 | 7 | 8 | 9 | 10 | Final |
|---|---|---|---|---|---|---|---|---|---|---|---|
| Jamie King 🔨 | 1 | 0 | 2 | 1 | 0 | 1 | 0 | 0 | 0 | 2 | 7 |
| Wade White | 0 | 1 | 0 | 0 | 1 | 0 | 0 | 2 | 0 | 0 | 4 |

| Sheet D | 1 | 2 | 3 | 4 | 5 | 6 | 7 | 8 | 9 | 10 | Final |
|---|---|---|---|---|---|---|---|---|---|---|---|
| Kevin Martin 🔨 | 1 | 0 | 2 | 0 | 2 | 0 | 3 | 0 | 1 | 1 | 10 |
| Brendan Bottcher | 0 | 2 | 0 | 3 | 0 | 1 | 0 | 2 | 0 | 0 | 8 |

=== Draw 4 ===
Thursday, February 6, 2:00 pm

| Sheet A | 1 | 2 | 3 | 4 | 5 | 6 | 7 | 8 | 9 | 10 | Final |
|---|---|---|---|---|---|---|---|---|---|---|---|
| Matthew Blandford | 0 | 3 | 1 | 3 | 0 | 4 | X | X | X | X | 11 |
| Ted Appelman 🔨 | 1 | 0 | 0 | 0 | 3 | 0 | X | X | X | X | 4 |

| Sheet B | 1 | 2 | 3 | 4 | 5 | 6 | 7 | 8 | 9 | 10 | Final |
|---|---|---|---|---|---|---|---|---|---|---|---|
| Kevin Koe | 0 | 2 | 1 | 0 | 2 | 0 | 3 | X | X | X | 8 |
| Lloyd Hill 🔨 | 1 | 0 | 0 | 1 | 0 | 0 | 0 | X | X | X | 2 |

| Sheet C | 1 | 2 | 3 | 4 | 5 | 6 | 7 | 8 | 9 | 10 | Final |
|---|---|---|---|---|---|---|---|---|---|---|---|
| Mark Johnson 🔨 | 0 | 1 | 0 | 2 | 0 | 1 | 0 | 2 | 0 | 1 | 7 |
| Greg Pasichnuk | 0 | 0 | 1 | 0 | 1 | 0 | 3 | 0 | 1 | 0 | 6 |

| Sheet D | 1 | 2 | 3 | 4 | 5 | 6 | 7 | 8 | 9 | 10 | Final |
|---|---|---|---|---|---|---|---|---|---|---|---|
| Robert Schlender 🔨 | 1 | 0 | 3 | 0 | 0 | 0 | 2 | 0 | X | X | 6 |
| Charley Thomas | 0 | 2 | 0 | 1 | 2 | 2 | 0 | 3 | X | X | 10 |

=== Draw 5 ===
Thursday, February 6, 6:30 pm

| Sheet A | 1 | 2 | 3 | 4 | 5 | 6 | 7 | 8 | 9 | 10 | Final |
|---|---|---|---|---|---|---|---|---|---|---|---|
| Charley Thomas | 1 | 0 | 3 | 0 | 0 | 1 | 0 | 3 | 0 | 0 | 8 |
| Wade White 🔨 | 0 | 0 | 0 | 1 | 2 | 0 | 2 | 0 | 1 | 1 | 7 |

| Sheet B | 1 | 2 | 3 | 4 | 5 | 6 | 7 | 8 | 9 | 10 | Final |
|---|---|---|---|---|---|---|---|---|---|---|---|
| Mark Johnson 🔨 | 2 | 0 | 1 | 0 | 0 | 2 | 0 | 1 | 0 | 1 | 7 |
| Brendan Bottcher | 0 | 1 | 0 | 2 | 1 | 0 | 1 | 0 | 1 | 0 | 6 |

| Sheet C | 1 | 2 | 3 | 4 | 5 | 6 | 7 | 8 | 9 | 10 | Final |
|---|---|---|---|---|---|---|---|---|---|---|---|
| Kevin Martin 🔨 | 3 | 0 | 2 | 1 | 0 | 1 | 0 | X | X | X | 7 |
| Jamie King | 0 | 1 | 0 | 0 | 1 | 0 | 1 | X | X | X | 3 |

| Sheet D | 1 | 2 | 3 | 4 | 5 | 6 | 7 | 8 | 9 | 10 | Final |
|---|---|---|---|---|---|---|---|---|---|---|---|
| Kevin Koe | 0 | 0 | 0 | 0 | 0 | 2 | 0 | 0 | 0 | 0 | 2 |
| Matthew Blandford 🔨 | 0 | 0 | 0 | 1 | 1 | 0 | 1 | 0 | 0 | 1 | 4 |

=== Draw 6 ===
Friday, February 7, 9:00 am

| Sheet A | 1 | 2 | 3 | 4 | 5 | 6 | 7 | 8 | 9 | 10 | Final |
|---|---|---|---|---|---|---|---|---|---|---|---|
| Robert Schlender | 0 | 1 | 3 | 2 | 0 | 3 | X | X | X | X | 9 |
| Greg Pasichnuk 🔨 | 1 | 0 | 0 | 0 | 2 | 0 | X | X | X | X | 3 |

| Sheet C | 1 | 2 | 3 | 4 | 5 | 6 | 7 | 8 | 9 | 10 | Final |
|---|---|---|---|---|---|---|---|---|---|---|---|
| Brendan Bottcher | 0 | 1 | 0 | 1 | 0 | 0 | 1 | 0 | 1 | 0 | 4 |
| Ted Appelman 🔨 | 0 | 0 | 2 | 0 | 0 | 2 | 0 | 1 | 0 | 1 | 6 |

| Sheet D | 1 | 2 | 3 | 4 | 5 | 6 | 7 | 8 | 9 | 10 | Final |
|---|---|---|---|---|---|---|---|---|---|---|---|
| Wade White 🔨 | 1 | 1 | 0 | 2 | 0 | 2 | 3 | X | X | X | 9 |
| Lloyd Hill | 0 | 0 | 1 | 0 | 1 | 0 | 0 | X | X | X | 2 |

=== Draw 7 ===
Friday, February 7, 2:00 pm

| Sheet B | 1 | 2 | 3 | 4 | 5 | 6 | 7 | 8 | 9 | 10 | Final |
|---|---|---|---|---|---|---|---|---|---|---|---|
| Charley Thomas 🔨 | 0 | 1 | 1 | 0 | 1 | 2 | 0 | 0 | 1 | X | 6 |
| Mark Johnson | 0 | 0 | 0 | 1 | 0 | 0 | 0 | 2 | 0 | X | 3 |

| Sheet D | 1 | 2 | 3 | 4 | 5 | 6 | 7 | 8 | 9 | 10 | Final |
|---|---|---|---|---|---|---|---|---|---|---|---|
| Matthew Blandford 🔨 | 1 | 0 | 0 | 2 | 0 | 2 | 1 | 0 | 0 | 1 | 7 |
| Jamie King | 0 | 1 | 1 | 0 | 1 | 0 | 0 | 0 | 2 | 0 | 5 |

=== Draw 8 ===
Friday, February 7, 6:30 pm

| Sheet A | 1 | 2 | 3 | 4 | 5 | 6 | 7 | 8 | 9 | 10 | Final |
|---|---|---|---|---|---|---|---|---|---|---|---|
| Robert Schlender | 0 | 0 | 2 | 0 | 3 | 0 | 3 | 0 | 3 | X | 11 |
| Jamie King 🔨 | 1 | 1 | 0 | 2 | 0 | 1 | 0 | 1 | 0 | X | 6 |

| Sheet B | 1 | 2 | 3 | 4 | 5 | 6 | 7 | 8 | 9 | 10 | Final |
|---|---|---|---|---|---|---|---|---|---|---|---|
| Kevin Koe | 2 | 1 | 0 | 2 | 0 | 1 | 0 | 1 | X | X | 7 |
| Mark Johnson 🔨 | 0 | 0 | 1 | 0 | 0 | 0 | 2 | 0 | X | X | 3 |

| Sheet C | 1 | 2 | 3 | 4 | 5 | 6 | 7 | 8 | 9 | 10 | Final |
|---|---|---|---|---|---|---|---|---|---|---|---|
| Charley Thomas 🔨 | 1 | 0 | 1 | 0 | 2 | 0 | 1 | 1 | 0 | X | 6 |
| Matthew Blandford | 0 | 1 | 0 | 3 | 0 | 2 | 0 | 0 | 2 | X | 8 |

| Sheet D | 1 | 2 | 3 | 4 | 5 | 6 | 7 | 8 | 9 | 10 | Final |
|---|---|---|---|---|---|---|---|---|---|---|---|
| Wade White 🔨 | 1 | 0 | 1 | 0 | 2 | 0 | 0 | 1 | 0 | 0 | 5 |
| Ted Appelman | 0 | 1 | 0 | 1 | 0 | 1 | 1 | 0 | 3 | 3 | 10 |

=== Draw 9 ===
Saturday, February 8, 1:00 pm

| Sheet C | 1 | 2 | 3 | 4 | 5 | 6 | 7 | 8 | 9 | 10 | Final |
|---|---|---|---|---|---|---|---|---|---|---|---|
| Robert Schlender 🔨 | 2 | 0 | 1 | 0 | 0 | 0 | 0 | 0 | 1 | 0 | 4 |
| Kevin Koe | 0 | 1 | 0 | 0 | 0 | 2 | 0 | 0 | 0 | 4 | 7 |

| Sheet D | 1 | 2 | 3 | 4 | 5 | 6 | 7 | 8 | 9 | 10 | Final |
|---|---|---|---|---|---|---|---|---|---|---|---|
| Ted Appelman 🔨 | 0 | 0 | 0 | 1 | 0 | 0 | 1 | 0 | X | X | 2 |
| Charley Thomas | 0 | 1 | 1 | 0 | 2 | 2 | 0 | 1 | X | X | 7 |

== Playoffs ==
Page playoff system
A | Kevin Martin | 10
B | Matthew Blandford | 4
C1 | Kevin Koe | 8
C2 | Charley Thomas | 7

Semifinal
B | Matthew Blandford | 4
C1 | Kevin Koe | 8

Final
A | Kevin Martin | 5
C1 | Kevin Koe | 7

=== A vs. B ===
Saturday, February 8, 6:30 pm

| Sheet C | 1 | 2 | 3 | 4 | 5 | 6 | 7 | 8 | 9 | 10 | Final |
|---|---|---|---|---|---|---|---|---|---|---|---|
| Kevin Martin 🔨 | 0 | 3 | 1 | 0 | 0 | 3 | 0 | 3 | X | X | 10 |
| Matthew Blandford | 1 | 0 | 0 | 2 | 0 | 0 | 1 | 0 | X | X | 4 |

=== C1 vs. C2 ===
Saturday, February 8, 6:30 pm

| Sheet A | 1 | 2 | 3 | 4 | 5 | 6 | 7 | 8 | 9 | 10 | Final |
|---|---|---|---|---|---|---|---|---|---|---|---|
| Kevin Koe | 0 | 3 | 0 | 0 | 0 | 1 | 0 | 2 | 0 | 2 | 8 |
| Charley Thomas 🔨 | 2 | 0 | 1 | 1 | 0 | 0 | 1 | 0 | 2 | 0 | 7 |

=== Semifinal ===
Sunday, February 9, 9:00 am

| Sheet C | 1 | 2 | 3 | 4 | 5 | 6 | 7 | 8 | 9 | 10 | Final |
|---|---|---|---|---|---|---|---|---|---|---|---|
| Matthew Blandford 🔨 | 0 | 1 | 0 | 1 | 0 | 1 | 0 | 1 | 0 | 0 | 4 |
| Kevin Koe | 0 | 0 | 1 | 0 | 2 | 0 | 1 | 0 | 2 | 2 | 8 |

=== Final ===
Sunday, February 9, 2:00 pm

| Sheet C | 1 | 2 | 3 | 4 | 5 | 6 | 7 | 8 | 9 | 10 | Final |
|---|---|---|---|---|---|---|---|---|---|---|---|
| Kevin Martin 🔨 | 2 | 1 | 0 | 1 | 0 | 1 | 0 | 0 | 0 | 0 | 5 |
| Kevin Koe | 0 | 0 | 1 | 0 | 3 | 0 | 0 | 2 | 0 | 1 | 7 |

2014 Boston Pizza Cup

Kevin Koe
3rd Alberta Provincial Championship title
