= 2011 Wainwright Roaming Buffalo Classic =

World Curling Tour event

- Host city: Wainwright, Alberta
- Arena: Wainwright Curling Club
- Dates: November 18–21
- Winner: (British Columbia) Brent Pierce
- Curling club: New Westminster, British Columbia
- Skip: Brent Pierce
- Fourth: Jeff Richard
- Second: Kevin Recksiedler
- Lead: Grant Dezura
- Finalist: (Alberta) Wade White

The 2011 Wainwright Roaming Buffalo Classic was held from November 18 to 21 at the Wainwright Curling Club in Wainwright, Alberta as part of the 2011–12 World Curling Tour. The purse for the event was CAD$50,000, and the winner of the event, Brent Pierce, received CAD$12,000. The event was held in a triple-knockout format.

== Teams ==
Skip	Third	Second	Lead	Locale
Tom Appelman	Adam Enright	Brandon Klassen	Nathan Connolly	Edmonton, Alberta
Brent Bawel	Mike Jantzen	Sean O'Connor	Hardi Sulimma	Calgary, Alberta
Brendan Bottcher	Evan Asmussen	Landon Bucholz	Bryce Bucholz	Edmonton, Alberta
Warren Cross	Dean Darwent	Kyle Richard	Colin Huber	Edmonton, Alberta
Dalton				Wainwright, Alberta
Colin Davidson				Edmonton, Alberta
Jeff Erickson				Edmonton, Alberta
David Nedohin (fourth)	Randy Ferbey (skip)	Ted Appelman	Brendan Melnyk	Edmonton, Alberta
Albert Gerdung	Vance Elder	Darren Grierson	Trevor Slupski	Brooks, Alberta
Brad Heidt	Mitch Heidt	Josh Heidt	Regis Neumeier	Kindersley, Saskatchewan
Glen Kennedy	Dustin Eckstrand	Steve Meadows	Kris Meadows	Edmonton, Alberta
Lyle Kent				Calgary, Alberta
Warren Hassall (fourth)	Jamie King (skip)	Todd Brick	Sean Morris	Edmonton/Calgary, Alberta
Steve Laycock	Joel Jordison	Brennen Jones	Dallan Muyres	Saskatoon, Saskatchewan
Micky Lizmore	Bradley Thiessen	Kyle Reynolds	Karrick Martin	Edmonton, Alberta
Steve Mackey	Ryan O'Connor	Jim Brooks	Tim Sawatzky	Calgary, Alberta
Darrell McKee	Clint Dieno	Jason Jacobson	Brock Montgomery	Saskatoon, Saskatchewan
Jeff Richard (fourth)	Brent Pierce (skip)	Kevin Recksiedler	Grant Dezura	New Westminster, British Columbia
Kevin Yablonski (fourth)	Jon Rennie (skip)	Harrison Boss	Matthew McDonald	Calgary, Alberta
Dean Ross	Don DeLair	Chris Blackwell	Steve Jensen	Calgary, Alberta
Robert Schlender	Chris Lemishka	Don Bartlett	Darcy Hafso	Edmonton, Alberta
Dylan Webster	Parker Konschuh	Jacob Ortt	Mac Walton	Edmonton, Alberta
Wade White	Kevin Tym	Dan Holowaychuk	George White	Edmonton, Alberta
Jessi Wilkinson	Chris Evernden		Neal Woloschuk	Edmonton, Alberta
Jeremy Hodges (fourth)	Matt Willerton (skip)	Dalen Petersen	Nevin DeMilliano	Edmonton, Alberta
Dustin Kalthoff (fourth)	Randy Woytowich (skip)	Lionel Holm	Lyndon Holm	Saskatoon, Saskatchewan

== Knockout results ==
=== A event ===
First Knockout
(Alberta) Jon Rennie	8
(Alberta) Dalton	1
(Saskatchewan) Brad Heidt	4
(Alberta) Warren Cross	3
(Alberta) Jessi Wilkinson	1
(British Columbia) Brent Pierce	8
(Saskatchewan) Darrell McKee	5
(Alberta) Brendan Bottcher	3
(Alberta) Steve Mackey	3
(Alberta) Colin Davidson	9

Quarterfinals
(Alberta) Randy Ferbey	7
(Alberta) Jon Rennie	2
(Saskatchewan) Brad Heidt	6
(British Columbia) Brent Pierce	0
(Alberta) Tom Appelman	6
(Saskatchewan) Darrell McKee	3
(Alberta) Robert Schlender	4
(Alberta) Colin Davidson	6

Semifinals
(Alberta) Randy Ferbey	5
(Saskatchewan) Brad Heidt	3
(Alberta) Tom Appelman	10
(Alberta) Colin Davidson	5

Qualifier 1
(Alberta) Randy Ferbey	2
(Alberta) Tom Appelman	5

First Knockout
(Alberta) Glen Kennedy	1
(Alberta) Dylan Webster	8
(Alberta) Wade White	6
(Alberta) Randy Woytowich	3
(Alberta) Lyle Kent	2
(Saskatchewan) Steve Laycock	8
(Alberta) Jeff Erickson	5
(Alberta) Matt Willerton	9
(Alberta) Albert Gerdung	3
(Alberta) Micky Lizmore	6

Quarterfinals
(Alberta) Jamie King	7
(Alberta) Dylan Webster	0
(Alberta) Wade White	2
(Saskatchewan) Steve Laycock	4
(Alberta) Dean Ross	6
(Alberta) Matt Willerton	3
(Alberta) Brent Bawel	4
(Alberta) Micky Lizmore	9

Semifinals
(Alberta) Jamie King	6
(Saskatchewan) Steve Laycock	4
(Alberta) Dean Ross	5
(Alberta) Micky Lizmore	6

Qualifier 2
(Alberta) Jamie King	7
(Alberta) Micky Lizmore	6

=== B event ===
Second Knockout
(Alberta) Jessi Wilkinson	6
(Alberta) Warren Cross	7

Quarterfinals
(Saskatchewan) Darrell McKee	8
(Alberta) Dalton	1
(Alberta) Robert Schlender	7
(Alberta) Warren Cross	2

Semifinals
(Saskatchewan) Darrell McKee	4
(Saskatchewan) Steve Laycock	5
(Alberta) Robert Schlender	6
(Alberta) Dean Ross	4

To Qualifier 3
(Saskatchewan) Steve Laycock	2
(Alberta) Robert Schlender	9
Qualifier 3
(Alberta) Robert Schlender	1
(Alberta) Randy Ferbey	4

Second Knockout		Semifinals		To Qualifier 3
(Alberta) Jon Rennie	1
(Alberta) Brendan Bottcher	7	(Alberta) Brendan Bottcher	3
(British Columbia) Brent Pierce	5	(British Columbia) Brent Pierce	5
(Alberta) Steve Mackey	3			(British Columbia) Brent Pierce	2
				(Alberta) Randy Ferbey	7

Second Qualifier
(Alberta) Randy Woytowich	7
(Alberta) Lyle Kent	6

Quarterfinals
(Alberta) Matt Willerton	5
(Alberta) Glen Kennedy	7
(Alberta) Brent Bawel	7
(Alberta) Randy Woytowich	1

Semifinals
(Alberta) Glen Kennedy	0
(Alberta) Colin Davidson	4
(Alberta) Brent Bawel	1
(Saskatchewan) Brad Heidt	9

To Qualifier 4
(Alberta) Colin Davidson	6
(Saskatchewan) Brad Heidt	7
Qualifier 4
(Saskatchewan) Brad Heidt	8
(Alberta) Micky Lizmore	2

Second Knockout		Semifinals		To Qualifier 4
(Alberta) Dylan Webster	10
(Alberta) Jeff Erickson	3	(Alberta) Dylan Webster	10
(Alberta) Wade White	10	(Alberta) Wade White	5
(Alberta) Albert Gerdung	1			(Alberta) Dylan Webster	4
				(Alberta) Micky Lizmore	5

=== C event ===
Third Knockout		Semifinals		Qualifier 5
(Alberta) Warren Cross	1
(Alberta) Brendan Bottcher	7	(Alberta) Brendan Bottcher	6
(Saskatchewan) Darrell McKee	7	(Saskatchewan) Darrell McKee	1
(Alberta) Dean Ross	3			(Alberta) Brendan Bottcher	3
				(Alberta) Micky Lizmore	5

Third Knockout
(Alberta) Jon Rennie	7
(Alberta) Steve Mackey	1
(Alberta) Lyle Kent	2
(Alberta) Dalton	5

Semifinals
(Alberta) Jon Rennie	3
(Alberta) Colin Davidson	6
(Alberta) Dalton	1
(British Columbia) Brent Pierce	4

Qualifier 6
(Alberta) Colin Davidson	5
(British Columbia) Brent Pierce	7

Third Knockout
(Alberta) Jeff Erickson	3
(Alberta) Albert Gerdung	6
(Alberta) Jessi Wilkinson	7
(Alberta) Matt Willerton	6

Semifinals
(Alberta) Albert Gerdung	2
(Saskatchewan) Steve Laycock	8
(Alberta) Jessi Wilkinson	7
(Alberta) Dylan Webster	3

Qualifier 7
(Saskatchewan) Steve Laycock	1
(Alberta) Jessi Wilkinson	3

Third Knockout		Semifinals		Qualifier 8
(Alberta) Randy Woytowich	0
(Alberta) Wade White	6	(Alberta) Wade White	7
(Alberta) Glen Kennedy	7	(Alberta) Glen Kennedy	2
(Alberta) Brent Bawel	2			(Alberta) Wade White	9
				(Alberta) Robert Schlender	5

== Playoffs ==
Quarterfinals
(Alberta) Tom Appelman	2
(Alberta) Wade White	7
(Saskatchewan) Brad Heidt	5
(Alberta) Micky Lizmore	4
(Alberta) Randy Ferbey	4
(British Columbia) Brent Pierce	6
(Alberta) Jessi Wilkinson	4
(Alberta) Jamie King	2

Semifinals
(Alberta) Wade White	5
(Saskatchewan) Brad Heidt	1
(British Columbia) Brent Pierce	4
(Alberta) Jessi Wilkinson	1

Final
(Alberta) Wade White	4
(British Columbia) Brent Pierce	5
