= 2006–07 curling season =

- Sport: Curling

Seasons
- ← 2005–06 2007–08 →

The 2006-07 curling season began in September 2006 and ended in April 2007.

== Season of Champions top three finishes ==
(Only team's skip listed)

Event	Winner	Runner-up	Third place
Canadian Mixed	New Brunswick (Odishaw)	Quebec (Bélisle)	Manitoba (McNamee)
Continental Cup	Europe	(Canada) (United States) North America	
Canadian Juniors (men's)	Alberta (Thomas)	Prince Edward Island (Gallant)	Quebec (Richard)
Canadian Juniors (women's)	Newfoundland and Labrador (Devereaux)	Manitoba (Neufeld)	British Columbia (Sivertson)
Scotties Tournament of Hearts	Canada (Scott)	Saskatchewan (Betker)	Manitoba (Jones)
Tim Hortons Brier	Ontario (Howard)	Newfoundland and Labrador (Gushue)	Manitoba (Stoughton)
World Junior Championships (men's)	Canada (Thomas)	Sweden (Edin)	Switzerland (von Gunten)
World Junior Championships (women's)	Scotland (Reid)	Canada (Devereaux)	Denmark (Dupont)
Canada Cup (men's)	Randy Ferbey	Kevin Martin	Brad Gushue
Canada Cup (women's)	Jennifer Jones	Cathy King	Sherry Anderson
Canadian Seniors (men's)	Alberta (Ryan)	Ontario (Turcotte)	British Columbia (Folk)
Canadian Seniors (women's)	Alberta (Foster)	British Columbia (Smiley)	Saskatchewan (Thierman)
Women's World Championships	Canada (Scott)	Denmark (Jensen)	Scotland (Wood)
Men's World Championships	Canada (Howard)	Germany (Kapp)	United States (Birr)

== Other events ==
Event	Winner	Runner-up	Third place
European Mixed	Scotland (Brewster)	Italy (Bombassei)	Russia (Kirikov)
Pacific Championships (men's)	Australia (Millikin)	South Korea (Lee)	China (Wang W.B.)
Pacific Championships (women's)	China (Wang B.)	South Korea (Jeung)	Japan (Meguro)
European Championships (men's)	Switzerland (Schwaller)	Scotland (Murdoch)	Sweden (Carlsén)
European Championships (women's)	Russia (Privivkova)	Italy (Gaspari)	Switzerland (Ott)
European Junior Challenge (men's)	Germany (Neuner)	Czech Republic (Beres)	Italy (da Rin)
European Junior Challenge (women's)	Italy (Apollonio)	Czech Republic (Kubeskova)	Sweden (Sunding)
Pacific Juniors (men's)	China (Wang B.J.)	South Korea (Kim)	Japan (Ogihara)
Pacific Juniors (women's)	China (Sun)	South Korea (Oh)	New Zealand (Dallow)
Winter Universiade (men's)	United States (Shuster)	United Kingdom (Hamilton)	Sweden (Kraupp)
Winter Universiade (women's)	Canada (Gregor)	Russia (Privivkova)	Japan (Meguro)
Asian Winter Games (men's)	South Korea (Lee)	Japan (Kashiwagi)	China (Wang B.J.)
Asian Winter Games (women's)	South Korea (Jeung)	Japan (Tsuchiya)	China (Wang)
World Wheelchair Championship	Norway (Lorentsen)	Switzerland (Bolliger)	Scotland (McCreadie)
World Seniors (men's)	Scotland (Prentice)	Canada (Hackner)	Sweden (Roxin)
World Seniors (women's)	Sweden (Meldahl)	Canada (Dunn)	United States (Oleinik)

== CCA ranking events ==
=== Men's ===
Event	Date	Location	Winning skip
Baden Masters	Sept. 8-10	Baden-Dättwil, SUI	Kerry Burtnyk
Galt Curling Classic	Sept. 19-24	Cambridge, ON	Dale Matchett
RCMP Fall Open	Sept. 20-24	Ottawa, ON	Bryan Cochrane
September Shoot-Out	Sept. 21-24	Edmonton, AB	Robert Schlender**
Shorty Jenkins Classic	Sept. 21-24	Brockville, ON	Kevin Martin
Weston Fall Classic	Sept. 25-Oct. 1	Toronto, ON	Pat Ferris
Don Bartlett Curling Classic	Sept. 28-Oct. 1	Gander, NL	Kerry Burtnyk
Twin Anchors Houseboats/Prestige Hotels & Resorts Cash Spiel	Sept. 28-Oct.	Vernon, BC	Brent Pierce
Asham 8-Ender Open	Oct. 5-10	Winnipeg, MB	Kerry Burtnyk
Mac Ice Classic	Oct. 5-9	Ottawa	Pierre Charette
DirectWest Rocktoberfest Spiel	Oct. 6-9	Regina, SK	Al Schick
Swiss Cup Basel	Oct. 6-9	Basel, SUI	Brad Gushue
Westcoast Curling Classic	Oct. 6-9	New Westminster, BC	Kevin Martin
Hotel Courtenay Bay- TSA Curling Classic	Oct. 12-15	Saint John, NB	Russ Howard
Barrie Cash Spiel	Oct. 13-15	Barrie, ON	Cary Luner
Meyers Norris Penny Charity Classic Cash Spiel	Oct. 13-16	Medicine Hat, AB	Joel Jordison
Arnprior Cashspiel	Oct. 19-22	Arnprior	Jeff McCrady
La Coupe Québec La Cage aux Sports	Oct. 19-22	Quebec City, QC	Robert Desjardins
The Co-operative Curling Classic	Oct. 20-22	Guelph, ON	Greg Balsdon
Flint Energy Services Curling Classic	Oct. 20-23	Bonnyville, AB	Kevin Martin
Strauss Crown of Curling	Oct. 20-23	Kamloops, BC	Kerry Burtnyk
Brampton Bacardi Cash Spiel	Oct. 23-29	Brampton, ON	Greg Balsdon
CWC Capital Cup	Oct. 26-29	Fredericton, NB	Shawn Adams
Coupe Saguenay	Oct. 26-30	Saguenay, QC	Pierre Charette
2006 Don's Drywall Rainbow Charity Classic	Oct. 27-30	Lethbridge, AB	Mark Johnson
Meyers Norris Penny Prairie Classic	Oct. 27-30	Portage la Prairie, MB	Glenn Howard
Salmon Arm Curling Club Cash Spiel	Oct. 28-30	Salmon Arm, BC	Darren Smale
Rodd Curling Classic	Nov. 2-5	Charlottetown, PE	John Likely
Tim Hortons Classic	Nov. 2-5	Brantford, ON	Dwayne Fowler
Listowel Cash Spiel	Nov. 3-5	Listowel, ON	Jeff Newland**
Circuit provincial de curling	Nov. 9-12	Trois-Rivières, QC	Jean-Michel Ménard
Money Concepts Rideau Skins	Nov. 9-12	Ottawa, ON	Simon Dupuis**
Yukon Title Classic	Nov. 9-12	Fairbanks, USA	(United States) Jason Larway*
Best Western Wayside Inn Curling Classic	Nov. 9-13	Lloydminster, AB	Glenn Howard
Sobeys Curling Classic	Nov. 9-13	New Glasgow, NS	Shawn Adams
BDO Golden Horseshoe Classic	Nov. 10-12	Hamilton, ON	Wayne Middaugh
Whites Drug Store Classic	Nov. 10-13	Swan River, MB	Bruce Korte
Duluth Labatt Cash Spiel	Nov. 11-13	Duluth, USA	John Salo**
Gananoque Cash Spiel	Nov. 17-19	Gananoque, ON	Greg Richardson
Pharmasave Hampton Skins Classic	Nov. 17-19	Hampton, NB	Paul Dobson
Wainwright Roaming Buffalo Classic	Nov. 17-20	Wainwright, AB	Kevin Koe
Challenge Casino De Charlevoix	Nov. 23-26	Clermont, QC	Bryan Cochrane
Winn Rentals Kelowna Men's Cashspiel	Nov. 24-26	Kelowna, BC	Deane Horning
Interlake Pharmacy Classic	Nov. 24-27	Stonewall, MB	Kerry Burtnyk
Meyers Norris Penny Men's Cash Spiel	Nov. 24-27	Red Deer, AB	Jamie King
Pharma Choice Curling Classic	Nov. 24-27	Yorkton, SK	Randy Ferbey
Masters of Curling	Nov. 29-Dec. 3	Waterloo, ON	Glenn Howard
Brantford Nissan Classic	Nov. 3-Dec. 3	Brantford, ON	John Epping
Dauphin Clinic Pharmacy Cash Spiel	Dec. 1-4	Dauphin, MB	Peter Prokopowich**
Point Optical Charity Curling Classic	Dec. 1-4	Saskatoon, SK	Brian Humble
Atlantic Curling Tour Championships	Dec. 7-10	Miramichi, NB	Mike Kennedy
NOCT Christies RV Classic	Dec. 8-10	Sault Ste. Marie, ON	Al Harnden**
Canada Cup Qualifier	Dec. 14-18	Edmonton, AB	Kevin Martin
Manitoba Curling Tour Championships	Dec. 15-17	Portage la Prairie, MB	Don Spriggs
Ramada Masters	Jan. 3-7	Perth, SCO	Randy Ferbey
BDO Grand Slam	Jan. 25-28	Winnipeg, MB	Kevin Martin
AB Men	Feb. 7-11	Drayton Valley, AB	Kevin Martin
BC Men	Feb. 7-11	Langley, BC	Dean Joanisse
MB Men	Feb. 7-11	Dauphin, MB	Jeff Stoughton
N Ont Men	Feb. 7-11	Sudbury, ON	Al Harnden
NB Men	Feb. 7-11	Moncton, NB	Paul Dobson
NL Men	Feb. 7-11	St. John's, NL	Brad Gushue
NS Men	Feb. 7-11	Halifax, NS	Mark Kehoe
PEI Men	Feb. 7-11	Charlottetown, PE	Peter Gallant
QC Men	Feb. 7-11	Sorel, QC	Pierre Charette
SK Men	Feb. 7-11	Humboldt, SK	Pat Simmons
Terr Men	Feb. 7-11	Yellowknife, NT	Jamie Koe
ON Men	Feb. 14-18	Sarnia, ON	Glenn Howard
Tim Hortons Brier	Mar. 3-11	Hamilton, ON	Glenn Howard
Strauss Canada Cup	Mar. 13-18	Kamloops, BC	Randy Ferbey
The National	Mar. 21-25	Port Hawkesbury, NS	Kevin Martin
Bear Mountain Classic	Apr. 6-9	Victoria, BC	Jeff Stoughton
Players' Championship	Apr. 11-15	Calgary, AB	Kevin Martin

=== Women's ===
Event	Date	Location	Winning skip
Galt Curling Classic	Sept. 19-24	Cambridge, ON	Alison Goring
September Shoot-Out	Sept. 21-24	Edmonton, AB	Renée Sonnenberg
Shorty Jenkins Classic	Sept. 21-24	Brockville, ON	Carrie Lindner
Weber Cup Oslo	Sept. 21-24	Oslo, NOR	(Sweden) Anette Norberg*
Weston Fall Classic	Sept 25-Oct. 1	Toronto, ON	Janet McGhee
Twin Anchors Houseboats/Prestige Hotels & Resorts Cash Spiel	Sept. 28-Oct. 1	Vernon, BC	Kelley Law
Trail Appliances Autumn Gold Classic	Oct. 6-9	Calgary, AB	Kelly Scott
Women's Basel Masters	Oct. 13-15	Basel, SUI	(Sweden) Anette Norberg*
Meyers Norris Penny Charity Classic Cash Spiel	Oct. 13-16	Medicine Hat, AB	Cheryl Bernard
Southwestern Ontario Women's Charity Cashspiel	Oct. 13-16	London, ON	Sherry Middaugh
Lady Monctonian Invitational Spiel	Oct. 20-22	Moncton, NB	Kay Zinck
Casinos of Winnipeg Women's Curling Classic	Oct. 20-23	Winnipeg, MB	Sherry Anderson
Strauss Crown of Curling	Oct. 20-23	Kamloops, BC	Pat Sanders
Brampton Bacardi Cash Spiel	Oct. 23-29	Brampton, ON	Janet McGhee
2006 Pot of Gold Charity Classic	Oct. 27-29	Lethbridge, AB	Leslie Rogers
Colonial Square Ladies Curling Classic	Oct. 27-30	Saskatoon, SK	Jennifer Jones
Rodd Curling Classic	Nov. 2-5	Charlottetown, PE	Kay Zinck
1st Annual Scotiabank / OVCA Women's Fall Classic	Nov. 3-5	Kemptville, ON	Janet McGhee
Prince Albert Business Ladies' Cash Spiel	Nov. 3-5	Prince Albert, SK	Tracy Streifel
Asham 8-Ender Women's Open	Nov. 3-6	Winnipeg, MB	Jennifer Jones
Community Savings Ladies Cash Spiel	Nov. 3-6	Red Deer, AB	Sherry Anderson
Southeast Ladies Classic	Nov. 9-12	Estevan, SK	Leah Birnie**
Sobeys Curling Classic	Nov. 9-13	New Glasgow, NS	Nancy McConnery
Duluth Labatt Cash Spiel	Nov. 11-13	Duluth, USA	(United States) Aileen Soumunen*
Fredericton Women's Curling Classic	Nov. 17-19	Fredericton, NB	Mary-Anne Arsenault
Nipawin Evergreen Curling Classic	Nov. 17-20	Nipawin, SK	Nola Zingel
Wayden Transportation - Ladies Classic Abbotsford 2006	Nov. 17-20	Abbotsford, BC	Stefanie Lawton
Interlake Pharmacy Classic	Nov. 23-27	Stonewall, MB	Barb Spencer
Prestige Inn's Kelowna Ladies Cashspiel	Nov. 24-26	Kelowna, BC	Lisa Stephenson
Schmirler Charity Classic	Nov. 24-27	Regina, SK	Cathy King
Holly and Mistletoe	Nov. 30-Dec. 3	St. Albert, AB	Faye White
John Shea Insurance Canada Cup Qualifier	Dec. 14-18	Ottawa, ON	Jennifer Jones
International Bern Cup	Jan. 12-14	Bern, SUI	(Sweden) Anette Norberg*
PEI STOH	Jan. 18-21	Charlottetown, PE	Suzanne Gaudet
ONT STOH	Jan. 22-28	Toronto, ON	Krista Scharf
QC STOH	Jan. 22-28	Sherbrooke, QC	Chantal Osborne
BC STOH	Jan. 24-28	Kamloops, BC	Kelley Law
MB STOH	Jan. 24-28	Morris, MB	Jennifer Jones
NB STOH	Jan. 24-28	Fredericton, NB	Sandy Comeau
NL STOH	Jan. 24-28	St. John's, NL	Heather Strong
NS STOH	Jan. 24-28	New Glasgow, NS	Jill Mouzar
Terr STOH	Jan. 24-28	Whitehorse, YT	Kerry Koe
AB STOH	Jan 25-28	Grande Prairie, AB	Cheryl Bernard
SK STOH	Jan. 31-Feb. 6	Balgonie, SK	Jan Betker
Scotties Tournament of Hearts	Feb. 17-25	Lethbridge, AB	Kelly Scott
Strauss Canada Cup	Mar. 13-18	Kamloops, BC	Jennifer Jones
World Championship	Mar. 17-24	Aomori, JPN	Kelly Scott
Players' Championship	Apr. 10-14	Calgary, AB	Jennifer Jones

== WCT Money Ranking ==
#	Men's teams	$ (CAD)
1	Kevin Martin	176,000
2	Randy Ferbey	122,563
3	Glenn Howard	118,661
4	Kevin Koe	105,000
5	Kerry Burtnyk	86,424
6	Pat Simmons	62,400
7	Jeff Stoughton	58,650
8	Brad Gushue	40,000
9	Mark Johnson	38,600
10	Joel Jordison	37,000

Preceded by 2005–06	2006–07 curling season September 2006 – April 2007	Succeeded by 2007–08
