= 2012 The National =

Grand Slam of Curling event

2012 Pomeroy Inn & Suites National
- Host city: Dawson Creek, British Columbia
- Arena: EnCana Events Centre
- Dates: January 25–29
- Winner: (Ontario) Glenn Howard
- Curling club: Coldwater & District CC, Coldwater
- Skip: Glenn Howard
- Third: Wayne Middaugh
- Second: Brent Laing
- Lead: Craig Savill
- Finalist: (Alberta) Kevin Martin

The 2012 Pomeroy Inn & Suites National was held from January 25 to 29 at the EnCana Events Centre in Dawson Creek, British Columbia. It was the third Grand Slam event of the 2011–12 curling season and the eleventh time the tournament has been held. The purse was CAD$100,000.

In the final, Glenn Howard held off Kevin Martin to win the game with a score of 6–5 and clinch his second Grand Slam of the year, his third career Grand Slam at The National, and his tenth career Grand Slam overall.

== CBC drops television coverage ==
Due to a dispute with iSport Media, the Slam management organization, the Canadian Broadcasting Corporation, which had been covering the Slams for four years, dropped their coverage of the 2012 National event at the last minute. It will make the first time since the 1962 Macdonald Brier that CBC will not be broadcasting curling.

== Teams ==
Skip	Third	Second	Lead	Locale
Brent Bawel	Mike Jantzen	Sean O'Connor	Hardi Sulimma	Calgary, Alberta
Jim Cotter	Kevin Folk	Tyrel Griffith	Rick Sawatsky	Kelowna/Vernon, British Columbia
Niklas Edin	Sebastian Kraupp	Fredrik Lindberg	Viktor Kjäll	Karlstad, Sweden
Rob Fowler	Allan Lyburn	Richard Daneault	Derek Samagalski	Brandon, Manitoba
Brad Gushue	Ryan Fry	Geoff Walker	Adam Casey	St. John's, Newfoundland and Labrador
Glenn Howard	Wayne Middaugh	Brent Laing	Craig Savill	Coldwater, Ontario
Warren Hassall (fourth)	Jamie King (skip)	Todd Brick	Sean Morris	Edmonton/Calgary, Alberta
Kevin Koe	Pat Simmons	Carter Rycroft	Nolan Thiessen	Edmonton, Alberta
Steve Laycock	Joel Jordison	Brennen Jones	Dallan Muyres	Saskatoon, Saskatchewan
Kevin Martin	John Morris	Marc Kennedy	Ben Hebert	Edmonton, Alberta
Mike McEwen	B. J. Neufeld	Matt Wozniak	Denni Neufeld	Winnipeg, Manitoba
Dan Petryk (fourth)	Steve Petryk (skip)	Colin Hodgson	Brad Chyz	Calgary, Alberta
Brent Pierce	Jeff Richard	Kevin Recksiedler	Grant Dezura	New Westminster, British Columbia
Robert Rumfeldt	Adam Spencer	Scott Hodgson	Greg Robinson	Guelph, Ontario
Robert Schlender	Chris Lemishka	Darcy Hafso	Don Bartlett	Edmonton, Alberta
Jeff Stoughton	Jon Mead	Reid Carruthers	Steve Gould	Winnipeg, Manitoba
Thomas Ulsrud	Torger Nergård	Christoffer Svae	Håvard Vad Petersson	Oslo, Norway
Brock Virtue	J. D. Lind	Dominic Daemen	Matthew Ng	Calgary, Alberta

== Round-robin standings ==
Final round-robin standings

Key
Teams to Playoffs
Teams to Tiebreaker

Pool A	W	L	PF	PA
(British Columbia) Jim Cotter	4	1	30	19
(Norway) Thomas Ulsrud	3	2	23	27
(Alberta) Kevin Koe	3	2	27	27
(Manitoba) Mike McEwen	2	3	17	22
(Alberta) Brock Virtue	2	3	25	22
(British Columbia) Brent Pierce	1	4	20	35

Pool B	W	L	PF	PA
(Alberta) Kevin Martin	5	0	41	26
(Alberta) Brent Bawel	3	2	34	28
(Sweden) Niklas Edin	3	2	33	23
(Manitoba) Rob Fowler	2	3	20	28
(Alberta) Jamie King	2	3	27	34
(Alberta) Robert Schlender	0	5	19	39

Pool C	W	L	PF	PA
(Ontario) Glenn Howard	5	0	37	17
(Manitoba) Jeff Stoughton	3	2	26	26
(Newfoundland and Labrador) Brad Gushue	3	2	29	25
(Saskatchewan) Steve Laycock	2	3	15	13
(Ontario) Robert Rumfeldt	2	3	19	27
(Alberta) Steve Petryk	0	5	18	29

== Round-robin results ==
All times listed in Pacific Standard Time (UTC-08).

=== Draw 1 ===
Wednesday, January 25, 7:30 pm

Sheet A	1	2	3	4	5	6	7	8	Final
(Alberta) Kevin Koe	0	2	0	2	0	0	2	X	6
(British Columbia) Jim Cotter 🔨	1	0	1	0	1	1	0	X	4

Sheet B	1	2	3	4	5	6	7	8	Final
(Alberta) Kevin Martin 🔨	2	0	2	0	1	4	X	X	9
(Manitoba) Rob Fowler	0	1	0	1	0	0	X	X	2

Sheet C	1	2	3	4	5	6	7	8	Final
(Manitoba) Jeff Stoughton	0	1	0	1	2	0	X	X	4
(Newfoundland and Labrador) Brad Gushue 🔨	2	0	3	0	0	4	X	X	9

Sheet D	1	2	3	4	5	6	7	8	Final
(Manitoba) Mike McEwen 🔨	1	1	0	1	0	0	1	0	4
(Norway) Thomas Ulsrud	0	0	2	0	2	0	0	1	5

Sheet E	1	2	3	4	5	6	7	8	Final
(Sweden) Niklas Edin	0	3	2	0	0	0	1	0	6
(Alberta) Jamie King 🔨	3	0	0	1	0	1	0	2	7

=== Draw 2 ===
Thursday, January 26, 9:00 am

Sheet A	1	2	3	4	5	6	7	8	Final
(Ontario) Glenn Howard	0	1	1	0	2	0	3	X	7
(Alberta) Steve Petryk 🔨	1	0	0	1	0	2	0	X	4

Sheet B	1	2	3	4	5	6	7	8	Final
(Saskatchewan) Steve Laycock 🔨	1	2	0	0	0	0	2	X	5
(Ontario) Robert Rumfeldt	0	0	1	0	0	1	0	X	2

Sheet C	1	2	3	4	5	6	7	8	Final
(Alberta) Kevin Koe	0	1	0	1	0	2	1	0	5
(Norway) Thomas Ulsrud 🔨	1	0	1	0	2	0	0	2	6

Sheet D	1	2	3	4	5	6	7	8	Final
(Alberta) Brock Virtue 🔨	2	0	3	3	0	X	X	X	8
(British Columbia) Brent Pierce	0	1	0	0	1	X	X	X	2

Sheet E	1	2	3	4	5	6	7	8	Final
(Alberta) Brent Bawel	1	0	2	0	3	0	0	1	7
(Alberta) Robert Schlender 🔨	0	2	0	2	0	1	0	0	5

=== Draw 3 ===
Thursday, January 26, 12:30 pm

Sheet A	1	2	3	4	5	6	7	8	Final
(Alberta) Jamie King	0	0	1	0	2	X	X	X	3
(Alberta) Brent Bawel 🔨	2	1	0	6	0	X	X	X	9

Sheet B	1	2	3	4	5	6	7	8	Final
(British Columbia) Brent Pierce 🔨	1	0	1	0	0	0	X	X	2
(British Columbia) Jim Cotter	0	2	0	3	1	1	X	X	7

Sheet C	1	2	3	4	5	6	7	8	Final
(Alberta) Kevin Martin 🔨	1	0	1	0	1	2	2	X	7
(Sweden) Niklas Edin	0	1	0	2	0	0	0	X	3

Sheet D	1	2	3	4	5	6	7	8	Final
(Manitoba) Rob Fowler	1	0	2	1	1	0	2	X	7
(Alberta) Robert Schlender 🔨	0	1	0	0	0	1	0	X	2

Sheet E	1	2	3	4	5	6	7	8	Final
(Manitoba) Mike McEwen	1	3	0	1	0	3	X	X	8
(Alberta) Brock Virtue 🔨	0	0	1	0	1	0	X	X	2

=== Draw 4 ===
Thursday, January 26, 4:30 pm

Sheet A	1	2	3	4	5	6	7	8	Final
(Sweden) Niklas Edin 🔨	2	0	4	0	2	X	X	X	8
(Manitoba) Rob Fowler	0	2	0	1	0	X	X	X	3

Sheet B	1	2	3	4	5	6	7	8	9	Final
(Ontario) Glenn Howard 🔨	2	0	1	0	0	2	0	0	1	6
(Newfoundland and Labrador) Brad Gushue	0	1	0	1	2	0	0	1	0	5

Sheet C	1	2	3	4	5	6	7	8	Final
(Manitoba) Mike McEwen	0	1	0	0	0	2	0	X	3
(British Columbia) Jim Cotter 🔨	2	0	1	1	1	0	1	X	6

Sheet D	1	2	3	4	5	6	7	8	Final
(Manitoba) Jeff Stoughton	0	2	0	2	1	0	2	X	7
(Ontario) Robert Rumfeldt 🔨	1	0	1	0	0	1	0	X	3

Sheet E	1	2	3	4	5	6	7	8	Final
(Saskatchewan) Steve Laycock	0	0	0	0	3	1	0	X	4
(Alberta) Steve Petryk 🔨	0	0	0	1	0	0	1	X	2

=== Draw 5 ===
Thursday, January 26, 8:00 pm

Sheet A	1	2	3	4	5	6	7	8	Final
(Manitoba) Jeff Stoughton	0	0	0	2	1	0	2	0	5
(Saskatchewan) Steve Laycock 🔨	1	0	1	0	0	1	0	0	3

Sheet B	1	2	3	4	5	6	7	8	Final
(Norway) Thomas Ulsrud	0	0	1	0	0	0	X	X	1
(Alberta) Brock Virtue 🔨	0	1	0	0	2	4	X	X	7

Sheet C	1	2	3	4	5	6	7	8	Final
(Newfoundland and Labrador) Brad Gushue 🔨	1	0	1	0	1	0	1	0	4
(Ontario) Rob Rumfeldt	0	3	0	2	0	1	0	1	7

Sheet D	1	2	3	4	5	6	7	8	9	Final
(Alberta) Kevin Martin	1	0	2	0	2	0	2	0	1	8
(Alberta) Jamie King 🔨	0	2	0	1	0	1	0	3	0	7

Sheet E	1	2	3	4	5	6	7	8	Final
(Alberta) Kevin Koe	1	0	0	1	0	3	0	X	5
(British Columbia) Brent Pierce 🔨	0	1	2	0	4	0	2	X	9

=== Draw 6 ===
Friday, January 27, 8:00 am

Sheet A	1	2	3	4	5	6	7	8	Final
(Alberta) Jamie King 🔨	1	2	0	0	2	0	0	3	8
(Alberta) Robert Schlender	0	0	0	1	0	1	1	0	3

Sheet B	1	2	3	4	5	6	7	8	Final
(Newfoundland and Labrador) Brad Gushue 🔨	0	0	3	0	1	0	1	2	7
(Alberta) Steve Petryk	1	1	0	2	0	1	0	0	5

Sheet C	1	2	3	4	5	6	7	8	Final
(Ontario) Glenn Howard 🔨	3	0	3	0	2	X	X	X	8
(Ontario) Robert Rumfeldt	0	1	0	1	0	X	X	X	2

Sheet D	1	2	3	4	5	6	7	8	Final
(British Columbia) Jim Cotter 🔨	4	0	0	1	0	1	0	0	6
(Alberta) Brock Virtue	0	0	0	0	2	0	3	0	5

Sheet E	1	2	3	4	5	6	7	8	Final
(Manitoba) Rob Fowler	0	0	0	X	X	X	X	X	0
(Alberta) Brent Bawel 🔨	2	3	2	X	X	X	X	X	7

=== Draw 7 ===
Friday, January 27, 11:30 am

Sheet A	1	2	3	4	5	6	7	8	Final
(Alberta) Kevin Martin 🔨	0	2	1	0	2	0	2	1	8
(Alberta) Brent Bawel	1	0	0	3	0	3	0	0	7

Sheet B	1	2	3	4	5	6	7	8	Final
(Ontario) Glenn Howard	1	0	3	0	5	X	X	X	9
(Saskatchewan) Steve Laycock	0	1	0	1	0	X	X	X	2

Sheet C	1	2	3	4	5	6	7	8	Final
(Manitoba) Jeff Stoughton 🔨	3	0	0	2	0	1	0	X	6
(Alberta) Steve Petryk	0	0	2	0	1	0	1	X	4

Sheet D	1	2	3	4	5	6	7	8	Final
(Sweden) Niklas Edin 🔨	0	0	3	0	1	0	4	X	8
(Alberta) Robert Schlender	0	0	0	1	0	1	0	X	2

Sheet E	1	2	3	4	5	6	7	8	Final
(British Columbia) Brent Pierce 🔨	1	0	1	0	1	0	1	0	4
(Norway) Thomas Ulsrud	0	1	0	2	0	3	0	2	8

=== Draw 8 ===
Friday, January 27, 3:00 pm

Sheet A	1	2	3	4	5	6	7	8	Final
(Norway) Thomas Ulsrud	0	0	1	0	2	0	0	X	3
(British Columbia) Jim Cotter 🔨	1	0	0	2	0	0	4	X	7

Sheet B	1	2	3	4	5	6	7	8	Final
(Manitoba) Mike McEwen 🔨	2	0	2	1	0	1	1	X	7
(British Columbia) Brent Pierce	0	2	0	0	1	0	0	X	3

Sheet C	1	2	3	4	5	6	7	8	Final
(Manitoba) Rob Fowler 🔨	2	3	0	2	0	1	X	X	8
(Alberta) Jamie King	0	0	1	0	1	0	X	X	2

Sheet D	1	2	3	4	5	6	7	8	9	Final
(Newfoundland and Labrador) Brad Gushue 🔨	1	0	1	1	0	0	0	0	1	4
(Saskatchewan) Steve Laycock	0	0	0	0	1	1	1	0	0	3

Sheet E	1	2	3	4	5	6	7	8	Final
(Alberta) Kevin Koe 🔨	0	1	0	2	1	0	0	1	5
(Alberta) Brock Virtue	0	0	1	0	0	2	0	0	3

=== Draw 9 ===
Friday, January 27, 8:00 pm

Sheet A	1	2	3	4	5	6	7	8	Final
(Alberta) Steve Petryk 🔨	0	0	2	0	0	1	0	0	3
(Ontario) Robert Rumfeldt	0	0	0	0	2	0	2	1	5

Sheet B	1	2	3	4	5	6	7	8	Final
(Sweden) Niklas Edin 🔨	1	0	1	0	5	0	1	X	8
(Alberta) Brent Bawel	0	1	0	1	0	2	0	X	4

Sheet C	1	2	3	4	5	6	7	8	9	Final
(Manitoba) Mike McEwen	0	3	0	1	0	0	1	0	0	5
(Alberta) Kevin Koe 🔨	2	0	1	0	0	1	0	1	1	6

Sheet D	1	2	3	4	5	6	7	8	Final
(Manitoba) Jeff Stoughton 🔨	1	0	0	1	0	2	0	X	4
(Ontario) Glenn Howard	0	1	1	0	4	0	1	X	7

Sheet E	1	2	3	4	5	6	7	8	Final
(Alberta) Kevin Martin	0	0	3	0	4	2	0	X	9
(Alberta) Robert Schlender 🔨	2	2	0	2	0	0	1	X	7

== Tiebreaker ==
Saturday, January 28, 8:30 am

Sheet B	1	2	3	4	5	6	7	8	Final
(Sweden) Niklas Edin 🔨	1	1	0	2	0	1	0	X	5
(Alberta) Brent Bawel	0	0	1	0	1	0	1	X	3

== Playoffs ==
Quarterfinals
(Alberta) Kevin Martin	4
(Sweden) Niklas Edin	1
(Norway) Thomas Ulsrud	3
(Newfoundland and Labrador) Brad Gushue	4
(Ontario) Glenn Howard	8
(Manitoba) Jeff Stoughton	3
(British Columbia) Jim Cotter	5
(Alberta) Kevin Koe	3

Semifinals
(Alberta) Kevin Martin	4
(Newfoundland and Labrador) Brad Gushue	3
(Ontario) Glenn Howard	8
(British Columbia) Jim Cotter	3

Final
(Alberta) Kevin Martin	5
(Ontario) Glenn Howard	6

=== Quarterfinals ===
Saturday, January 28, 12:00 pm

Team	1	2	3	4	5	6	7	8	Final
(Alberta) Kevin Martin 🔨	0	1	0	1	0	0	2	X	4
(Sweden) Niklas Edin	0	0	0	0	0	1	0	X	1

Team	1	2	3	4	5	6	7	8	Final
(Norway) Thomas Ulsrud 🔨	0	0	1	0	0	1	1	X	3
(Newfoundland and Labrador) Brad Gushue	1	1	0	1	1	0	0	X	4

Team	1	2	3	4	5	6	7	8	Final
(Ontario) Glenn Howard 🔨	0	2	0	4	0	2	X	X	8
(Manitoba) Jeff Stoughton	0	0	1	0	2	0	X	X	3

Team	1	2	3	4	5	6	7	8	Final
(British Columbia) Jim Cotter 🔨	0	2	0	0	0	2	0	1	5
(Alberta) Kevin Koe	1	0	1	1	0	0	0	0	3

=== Semifinals ===
Saturday, January 28, 6:00 pm

Team	1	2	3	4	5	6	7	8	Final
(Alberta) Kevin Martin 🔨	0	0	1	0	0	2	0	1	4
(Newfoundland and Labrador) Brad Gushue	0	0	0	1	0	0	2	0	3

Team	1	2	3	4	5	6	7	8	Final
(Ontario) Glenn Howard 🔨	1	2	1	0	2	0	2	X	8
(British Columbia) Jim Cotter	0	0	0	1	0	2	0	X	3

=== Final ===
Sunday, January 29, 11:00 am

Team	1	2	3	4	5	6	7	8	Final
(Alberta) Kevin Martin	0	1	0	2	0	1	0	1	5
(Ontario) Glenn Howard 🔨	3	0	1	0	1	0	1	0	6
