= Wainwright Roaming Buffalo Classic =

Former World Curling Tour event

The Wainwright Roaming Buffalo Classic was an annual bonspiel, or curling tournament, that took place at the Wainwright Curling Club in Wainwright, Alberta. The tournament was held in a triple-knockout format. The tournament, started in 1998 as part of the World Curling Tour, was held every year since with the exception of 2001, until 2012. Curlers from Alberta dominated the event.

== Past champions ==
Only skip's name is displayed.

Year	Winning team	Runner up team	Purse (CAD)
1998	(Manitoba) Jeff Stoughton		
1999	(Alberta) Kevin Martin		
2000	(Saskatchewan) Gary Scheirich		
2002	(Alberta) Kevin Park		
2003	(Alberta) Warren Hassall		
2004	(Alberta) Mark Johnson		
2005	(Alberta) Mark Johnson		
2006	(Alberta) Kevin Koe		
2007	(Alberta) Adrian Bakker	(Alberta) Shane Park	
2008	(Alberta) Shane Park	(Alberta) Ted Appelman	$40,000
2009	(Alberta) Warren Hassall	(Alberta) Brent Bawel	$40,000
2010	(Alberta) Robert Schlender	(Alberta) Jamie Fletcher	$45,000
2011	(British Columbia) Brent Pierce	(Alberta) Wade White	$45,000
2012	(Washington (state)) Mark Johnson	(Alberta) Jamie King	$55,000
