= Mark Johnson =

Mark Johnson may refer to:

== Entertainment ==
- Mark Johnson (musician) (born 1955), American banjoist
- Mark Johnson (producer) (born 1945), American film producer
- Mark Steven Johnson (born 1964), American film director and writer
- Mark Johnson, played officer Luke Everett in In the Heat of the Night
- Mark Johnson, creator of the multimedia music project Playing For Change

== Politics ==
- Mark Johnson (North Carolina politician) (active from 2016), American attorney, educator, and politician
- Mark Johnson (Oregon politician) (born 1957), American politician
- Mark Johnson (Minnesota politician), American lawyer, businessman and member of the Minnesota Senate
- Mark Johnson (Ohio politician), Ohio state representative

== Sports ==
=== Baseball ===
- Mark Johnson (baseball coach), Texas A&M Aggies, Sam Houston State Bearkats
- Mark Johnson (catcher) (born 1975), former professional baseball catcher
- Mark Johnson (first baseman) (born 1967), former professional baseball first baseman
- Mark Johnson (pitcher) (born 1975), former Major League Baseball pitcher
- Mark Johnson (umpire) (1950–2016), professional baseball umpire

=== Other sports ===
- Mark Johnson (American football) (born 1953), American football player
- Mark Johnson (announcer) (born 1966), British horse racing announcer
- Mark Johnson (basketball), American basketball coach
- Mark Johnson (boxer) (born 1971), American boxer
- Mark Johnson (cricketer, born 1963), American cricketer
- Mark Johnson (Yorkshire cricketer) (born 1958), former English first-class cricketer
- Mark Johnson (curler) (born 1958), American-Canadian curler from Edmonton, Alberta
- Mark Johnson (footballer) (born 1978), Australian rules footballer
- Mark Johnson (golfer) (born 1954), American professional golfer
- Mark Johnson (ice hockey) (born 1957), American gold medal winner at 1980 Winter Olympics
- Mark Johnson (rugby league) (born 1969), South African wing
- Mark Johnson (wrestler), American former Greco-Roman wrestler and coach
- Mark "Slick" Johnson, professional wrestling referee

== Other ==
- Mark Johnson (philosopher) (born 1949), philosophy professor
- Mark H. Johnson, developmental neuroscience professor
- Mark W. Johnson, co-founder of Innosight
- Mark A. Johnson, American physical chemist
- Mark Johnson, former chief meteorologist for WEWS-TV

== See also ==
- Marc Johnson (disambiguation)
- Mark Johnston (disambiguation)
