= 2021 Canadian Senior Curling Championships =

- Host city: Sault Ste. Marie, Ontario
- Arena: Community First Curling Centre
- Dates: December 6–11, 2021
- Men's winner: Alberta
- Curling club: Lac La Biche CC, Lac La Biche
- Skip: Wade White
- Third: Barry Chwedoruk
- Second: Dan Holowaychuk
- Lead: George White
- Finalist: Ontario (Bryan Cochrane)
- Women's winner: Saskatchewan
- Curling club: Nutana CC, Saskatoon
- Skip: Sherry Anderson
- Third: Patty Hersikorn
- Second: Brenda Goertzen
- Lead: Anita Silvernagle
- Finalist: British Columbia (Mary-Anne Arsenault)

The 2021 Everest Canadian Senior Curling Championships was held from December 6 to 11 at the Community First Curling Centre in Sault Ste. Marie, Ontario.

== Men ==
=== Teams ===
The teams are listed as follows:

Team	Skip	Third	Second	Lead	Alternate	Club
Alberta	Wade White	Barry Chwedoruk	Dan Holowaychuk	George White		Lac La Biche CC, Lac La Biche
British Columbia	Tom Buchy	Dave Toffolo	Kevin Maffioli	Darren Will		Kimberley CC, Kimberley
Manitoba	Randy Neufeld	Dean Moxham	Peter Nicholls	Dale Michie		La Salle CC, La Salle
New Brunswick	Terry Odishaw	Mike Kennedy	Charlie Sullivan	Grant Odishaw		Curl Moncton, Moncton
Newfoundland and Labrador	Keith Ryan	Mike Ryan	Barry Edwards	Dennis Langdon		Carol CC, Labrador City
Northern Ontario	Mike Desilets	Scott Henderson	Dale Wiersema	Bill Peloza		Fort William CC, Thunder Bay
Northwest Territories	Glen Hudy	Brian Kelln	Franz Dziuba	Richard Klakowich		Yellowknife CC, Yellowknife
Nova Scotia	Alan O'Leary	Stuart MacLean	Danny Christianson	Harold McCarthy		Dartmouth CC, Dartmouth
Nunavut	Peter Mackey	Jeff Nadeau	Greg Howard	–		Iqaluit CC, Iqaluit
Ontario	Bryan Cochrane	Ian MacAulay	Brian Lewis	Ken Sullivan	John Rothwell	Russell CC, Russell
Prince Edward Island	Philip Gorveatt	Kevin Champion	Sean Ledgerwood	Mike Dillon		Charlottetown CC, Charlottetown
Quebec	François Roberge	Serge Reid	Maxime Elmaleh	Daniel Bédard		CC Etchemin, Saint-Romuald; CC Kenogami, Jonquière; CC Lacolle, Lacolle
Saskatchewan	Darrell McKee	Mark Lane	Kory Kohuch	Rory Golanowski		Nutana CC, Saskatoon
Yukon	Terry Miller	Herb Balsam	Doug Hamilton	Don McPhee		Whitehorse CC, Whitehorse

=== Round-robin standings ===
Final round-robin standings

Key
Teams to Championship Pool

Pool A	Skip	W	L	W–L
Quebec	François Roberge	5	1	1–0
Saskatchewan	Darrell McKee	5	1	0–1
New Brunswick	Terry Odishaw	4	2	–
Newfoundland and Labrador	Keith Ryan	3	3	–
Nova Scotia	Alan O'Leary	2	4	1–0
Manitoba	Randy Neufeld	2	4	0–1
Northwest Territories	Glen Hudy	0	6	–

Pool B	Skip	W	L	W–L
Alberta	Wade White	6	0	–
Ontario	Bryan Cochrane	5	1	–
British Columbia	Tom Buchy	3	3	1–0
Northern Ontario	Mike Desilets	3	3	0–1
Prince Edward Island	Philip Gorveatt	2	4	–
Yukon	Terry Miller	1	5	1–0
Nunavut	Peter Mackey	1	5	0–1

=== Round-robin results ===
All draws are listed in Eastern Time (UTC−05:00).

==== Draw 1 ====
Monday, December 6, 8:30 am

Sheet 5	1	2	3	4	5	6	7	8	Final
Northern Ontario (Desilets) 🔨	1	0	1	2	0	0	3	X	7
Prince Edward Island (Gorveatt)	0	1	0	0	1	1	0	X	3

Sheet 6	1	2	3	4	5	6	7	8	Final
Newfoundland and Labrador (Ryan) 🔨	1	0	0	1	0	1	1	1	5
Nova Scotia (O'Leary)	0	1	0	0	2	0	0	0	3

==== Draw 2 ====
Monday, December 6, 12:00 pm

Sheet 1	1	2	3	4	5	6	7	8	Final
Manitoba (Neufeld) 🔨	0	1	0	1	0	2	0	X	4
New Brunswick (Odishaw)	1	0	2	0	1	0	2	X	6

Sheet 2	1	2	3	4	5	6	7	8	9	Final
British Columbia (Buchy) 🔨	1	0	1	0	2	0	1	0	0	5
Ontario (Cochrane)	0	2	0	1	0	1	0	1	1	6

Sheet 4	1	2	3	4	5	6	7	8	Final
Quebec (Roberge) 🔨	1	1	0	1	0	1	0	1	5
Saskatchewan (McKee)	0	0	1	0	1	0	2	0	4

Sheet 6	1	2	3	4	5	6	7	8	Final
Yukon (Miller)	0	0	1	2	0	1	0	0	4
Alberta (White) 🔨	0	2	0	0	1	0	3	1	7

==== Draw 3 ====
Monday, December 6, 4:00 pm

Sheet 2	1	2	3	4	5	6	7	8	Final
Newfoundland and Labrador (Ryan) 🔨	0	0	0	0	1	0	X	X	1
Saskatchewan (McKee)	1	1	3	1	0	2	X	X	8

Sheet 4	1	2	3	4	5	6	7	8	Final
Nunavut (Mackey) 🔨	1	0	0	0	0	0	X	X	1
Yukon (Miller)	0	2	1	2	1	1	X	X	7

Sheet 6	1	2	3	4	5	6	7	8	Final
New Brunswick (Odishaw)	0	0	3	2	0	0	4	X	9
Northwest Territories (Hudy) 🔨	1	1	0	0	1	1	0	X	4

Sheet 8	1	2	3	4	5	6	7	8	Final
Northern Ontario (Desilets) 🔨	1	0	2	0	0	0	0	1	4
Ontario (Cochrane)	0	1	0	0	2	2	1	0	6

==== Draw 4 ====
Monday, December 6, 8:30 pm

Sheet 2	1	2	3	4	5	6	7	8	Final
Quebec (Roberge) 🔨	2	0	0	0	2	1	4	X	9
Nova Scotia (O'Leary)	0	1	1	1	0	0	0	X	3

Sheet 3	1	2	3	4	5	6	7	8	Final
British Columbia (Buchy)	0	0	0	1	1	1	0	X	3
Prince Edward Island (Gorveatt) 🔨	0	1	1	0	0	0	4	X	6

Sheet 4	1	2	3	4	5	6	7	8	Final
Northwest Territories (Hudy)	0	0	0	2	1	0	0	X	3
Manitoba (Neufeld) 🔨	2	0	2	0	0	2	2	X	8

Sheet 8	1	2	3	4	5	6	7	8	Final
Alberta (White) 🔨	4	2	0	5	0	3	X	X	14
Nunavut (Mackey)	0	0	1	0	1	0	X	X	2

==== Draw 5 ====
Tuesday, December 7, 8:30 am

Sheet 5	1	2	3	4	5	6	7	8	Final
Saskatchewan (McKee) 🔨	4	0	0	1	0	2	1	X	8
New Brunswick (Odishaw)	0	0	2	0	1	0	0	X	3

Sheet 7	1	2	3	4	5	6	7	8	Final
Ontario (Cochrane) 🔨	5	1	0	1	1	1	X	X	9
Yukon (Miller)	0	0	1	0	0	0	X	X	1

==== Draw 6 ====
Tuesday, December 7, 12:00 pm

Sheet 3	1	2	3	4	5	6	7	8	Final
Manitoba (Neufeld)	0	3	0	0	1	0	X	X	4
Nova Scotia (O'Leary) 🔨	3	0	2	2	0	2	X	X	9

Sheet 4	1	2	3	4	5	6	7	8	Final
Prince Edward Island (Gorveatt)	0	2	0	1	1	0	0	X	4
Alberta (White) 🔨	2	0	1	0	0	3	1	X	7

Sheet 7	1	2	3	4	5	6	7	8	Final
Northern Ontario (Desilets) 🔨	2	0	4	0	1	2	X	X	9
Nunavut (Mackey)	0	1	0	0	0	0	X	X	1

Sheet 8	1	2	3	4	5	6	7	8	Final
Newfoundland and Labrador (Ryan)	1	2	1	1	1	2	X	X	8
Northwest Territories (Hudy) 🔨	0	0	0	0	0	0	X	X	0

==== Draw 7 ====
Tuesday, December 7, 4:00 pm

Sheet 3	1	2	3	4	5	6	7	8	Final
Northwest Territories (Hudy)	0	1	0	0	0	0	X	X	1
Saskatchewan (McKee) 🔨	3	0	2	1	2	1	X	X	9

Sheet 5	1	2	3	4	5	6	7	8	Final
Ontario (Cochrane) 🔨	0	2	4	1	0	0	X	X	7
Nunavut (Mackey)	1	0	0	0	0	1	X	X	2

Sheet 7	1	2	3	4	5	6	7	8	Final
Alberta (White) 🔨	0	2	0	0	1	2	2	X	7
British Columbia (Buchy)	0	0	1	0	0	0	0	X	1

Sheet 8	1	2	3	4	5	6	7	8	Final
Quebec (Roberge) 🔨	1	0	2	0	0	0	0	X	3
Manitoba (Neufeld)	0	1	0	2	0	2	2	X	7

==== Draw 8 ====
Tuesday, December 7, 8:00 pm

Sheet 3	1	2	3	4	5	6	7	8	Final
Newfoundland and Labrador (Ryan)	0	1	0	0	0	0	X	X	1
Quebec (Roberge) 🔨	4	0	1	1	1	3	X	X	10

Sheet 4	1	2	3	4	5	6	7	8	Final
British Columbia (Buchy)	0	1	0	1	0	2	0	1	5
Northern Ontario (Desilets) 🔨	1	0	1	0	1	0	1	0	4

Sheet 7	1	2	3	4	5	6	7	8	Final
Nova Scotia (O'Leary) 🔨	1	0	1	0	1	0	0	X	3
New Brunswick (Odishaw)	0	2	0	1	0	3	2	X	8

Sheet 8	1	2	3	4	5	6	7	8	Final
Prince Edward Island (Gorveatt) 🔨	2	1	0	6	0	1	X	X	10
Yukon (Miller)	0	0	2	0	1	0	X	X	3

==== Draw 9 ====
Wednesday, December 8, 8:30 am

Sheet 6	1	2	3	4	5	6	7	8	Final
Nunavut (Mackey)	0	0	0	1	0	1	X	X	2
British Columbia (Buchy) 🔨	2	2	2	0	2	0	X	X	8

Sheet 7	1	2	3	4	5	6	7	8	Final
Northwest Territories (Hudy)	0	0	1	0	0	1	X	X	2
Quebec (Roberge) 🔨	4	3	0	1	4	0	X	X	12

==== Draw 10 ====
Wednesday, December 8, 12:00 pm

Sheet 2	1	2	3	4	5	6	7	8	Final
Yukon (Miller) 🔨	0	1	0	2	0	1	0	X	4
Northern Ontario (Desilets)	0	0	1	0	2	0	4	X	7

Sheet 4	1	2	3	4	5	6	7	8	9	Final
New Brunswick (Odishaw) 🔨	0	2	0	0	0	1	0	0	1	4
Newfoundland and Labrador (Ryan)	1	0	0	1	0	0	0	1	0	3

Sheet 6	1	2	3	4	5	6	7	8	Final
Prince Edward Island (Gorveatt) 🔨	1	0	0	0	0	3	1	0	5
Ontario (Cochrane)	0	1	1	2	1	0	0	1	6

Sheet 8	1	2	3	4	5	6	7	8	Final
Saskatchewan (McKee)	1	1	0	2	2	0	1	X	7
Nova Scotia (O'Leary) 🔨	0	0	1	0	0	1	0	X	2

==== Draw 11 ====
Wednesday, December 8, 4:00 pm

Sheet 1	1	2	3	4	5	6	7	8	Final
New Brunswick (Odishaw)	0	1	0	2	0	1	0	0	4
Quebec (Roberge) 🔨	1	0	1	0	0	0	2	1	5

Sheet 3	1	2	3	4	5	6	7	8	Final
Alberta (White)	0	1	1	0	0	3	0	X	5
Northern Ontario (Desilets) 🔨	0	0	0	1	0	0	1	X	2

Sheet 5	1	2	3	4	5	6	7	8	Final
Yukon (Miller) 🔨	0	0	1	0	0	2	X	X	3
British Columbia (Buchy)	1	3	0	2	4	0	X	X	10

Sheet 7	1	2	3	4	5	6	7	8	Final
Manitoba (Neufeld) 🔨	2	0	1	1	0	0	1	0	5
Newfoundland and Labrador (Ryan)	0	4	0	0	1	1	0	2	8

==== Draw 12 ====
Wednesday, December 8, 8:00 pm

Sheet 1	1	2	3	4	5	6	7	8	Final
Ontario (Cochrane)	0	2	0	0	1	0	X	X	3
Alberta (White) 🔨	1	0	2	1	0	6	X	X	10

Sheet 2	1	2	3	4	5	6	7	8	Final
Nunavut (Mackey) 🔨	0	2	1	2	1	0	1	X	7
Prince Edward Island (Gorveatt)	1	0	0	0	0	1	0	X	2

Sheet 5	1	2	3	4	5	6	7	8	Final
Nova Scotia (O'Leary)	0	2	0	1	0	0	2	X	5
Northwest Territories (Hudy) 🔨	1	0	1	0	0	1	0	X	3

Sheet 6	1	2	3	4	5	6	7	8	Final
Saskatchewan (McKee) 🔨	4	0	0	3	0	0	0	1	8
Manitoba (Neufeld)	0	1	1	0	2	1	1	0	6

=== Placement round ===
==== Seeding pool ====
===== Standings =====
Final Seeding Pool Standings

Team	Skip	W	L	W–L
Manitoba	Randy Neufeld	5	4	–
Prince Edward Island	Philip Gorveatt	4	5	1–0
Nova Scotia	Alan O'Leary	4	5	0–1
Yukon	Terry Miller	2	7	1–0
Nunavut	Peter Mackey	2	7	0–1
Northwest Territories	Glen Hudy	0	9	–

===== Results =====
====== Draw 13 ======
Thursday, December 9, 8:30 am

Sheet 2	1	2	3	4	5	6	7	8	Final
Nova Scotia (O'Leary) 🔨	4	0	0	1	0	2	X	X	7
Nunavut (Mackey)	0	0	0	0	1	0	X	X	1

Sheet 4	1	2	3	4	5	6	7	8	Final
Prince Edward Island (Gorveatt) 🔨	2	0	1	0	5	0	0	X	8
Northwest Territories (Hudy)	0	1	0	1	0	1	1	X	4

Sheet 6	1	2	3	4	5	6	7	8	Final
Yukon (Miller) 🔨	2	0	0	1	0	1	0	X	4
Manitoba (Neufeld)	0	1	1	0	1	0	4	X	7

====== Draw 15 ======
Thursday, December 9, 3:30 pm

Sheet 2	1	2	3	4	5	6	7	8	9	Final
Manitoba (Neufeld) 🔨	0	3	0	3	0	1	0	0	1	8
Prince Edward Island (Gorveatt)	1	0	4	0	1	0	0	1	0	7

Sheet 4	1	2	3	4	5	6	7	8	Final
Yukon (Miller)	0	0	1	0	1	0	0	X	2
Nova Scotia (O'Leary) 🔨	1	2	0	3	0	1	1	X	8

Sheet 6	1	2	3	4	5	6	7	8	Final
Nunavut (Mackey)	0	0	1	0	0	1	0	2	4
Northwest Territories (Hudy) 🔨	1	0	0	0	1	0	1	0	3

====== Draw 17 ======
Friday, December 10, 10:00 am

Sheet 3	1	2	3	4	5	6	7	8	Final
Prince Edward Island (Gorveatt) 🔨	3	0	1	2	0	0	3	X	9
Nova Scotia (O'Leary)	0	1	0	0	1	1	0	X	3

Sheet 5	1	2	3	4	5	6	7	8	Final
Northwest Territories (Hudy) 🔨	0	1	1	0	2	0	2	0	6
Yukon (Miller)	2	0	0	2	0	2	0	2	8

Sheet 7	1	2	3	4	5	6	7	8	Final
Nunavut (Mackey) 🔨	0	0	0	0	1	0	X	X	1
Manitoba (Neufeld)	1	2	1	0	0	3	X	X	7

==== Championship pool ====
===== Standings =====
Final Championship Pool Standings

Team	Skip	W	L	W–L
Alberta	Wade White	10	0	–
Ontario	Bryan Cochrane	9	1	–
Quebec	François Roberge	7	3	1–0
Saskatchewan	Darrell McKee	7	3	0–1
New Brunswick	Terry Odishaw	6	4	–
British Columbia	Tom Buchy	4	6	1–0
Northern Ontario	Mike Desilets	4	6	0–1
Newfoundland and Labrador	Keith Ryan	3	7	–

===== Results =====
====== Draw 14 ======
Thursday, December 9, 12:00 pm

Sheet 5	1	2	3	4	5	6	7	8	Final
New Brunswick (Odishaw) 🔨	0	4	0	0	3	4	X	X	11
Northern Ontario (Desilets)	0	0	2	1	0	0	X	X	3

Sheet 6	1	2	3	4	5	6	7	8	Final
Newfoundland and Labrador (Ryan)	0	0	0	3	1	1	0	0	5
British Columbia (Buchy) 🔨	0	1	1	0	0	0	3	1	6

Sheet 7	1	2	3	4	5	6	7	8	Final
Quebec (Roberge) 🔨	0	3	0	2	0	0	1	0	6
Alberta (White)	3	0	1	0	2	0	0	1	7

Sheet 8	1	2	3	4	5	6	7	8	Final
Saskatchewan (McKee)	0	1	0	1	1	0	0	X	3
Ontario (Cochrane) 🔨	1	0	3	0	0	1	1	X	6

====== Draw 16 ======
Thursday, December 9, 7:00 pm

Sheet 1	1	2	3	4	5	6	7	8	Final
Quebec (Roberge)	0	0	0	1	0	0	X	X	1
Ontario (Cochrane) 🔨	2	2	0	0	0	2	X	X	6

Sheet 2	1	2	3	4	5	6	7	8	Final
Saskatchewan (McKee)	0	0	0	0	0	0	X	X	0
Alberta (White) 🔨	1	1	1	3	1	1	X	X	8

Sheet 3	1	2	3	4	5	6	7	8	Final
New Brunswick (Odishaw) 🔨	0	0	1	0	2	0	2	X	5
British Columbia (Buchy)	0	0	0	1	0	1	0	X	2

Sheet 4	1	2	3	4	5	6	7	8	Final
Newfoundland and Labrador (Ryan)	0	0	1	0	0	1	0	X	2
Northern Ontario (Desilets) 🔨	3	0	0	0	1	0	1	X	5

====== Draw 18 ======
Friday, December 10, 2:00 pm

Sheet 5	1	2	3	4	5	6	7	8	Final
British Columbia (Buchy)	0	0	1	1	0	0	0	X	2
Quebec (Roberge) 🔨	2	1	0	0	2	1	1	X	7

Sheet 6	1	2	3	4	5	6	7	8	Final
Northern Ontario (Desilets)	0	0	0	2	0	1	X	X	3
Saskatchewan (McKee) 🔨	0	1	1	0	2	0	X	X	4

Sheet 7	1	2	3	4	5	6	7	8	9	Final
Ontario (Cochrane) 🔨	1	0	2	0	0	0	0	1	3	7
Newfoundland and Labrador (Ryan)	0	2	0	1	1	0	0	0	0	4

Sheet 8	1	2	3	4	5	6	7	8	Final
Alberta (White) 🔨	1	1	0	0	0	1	0	1	4
New Brunswick (Odishaw)	0	0	1	0	0	0	1	0	2

====== Draw 19 ======
Friday, December 10, 7:00 pm

Sheet 1	1	2	3	4	5	6	7	8	Final
Alberta (White) 🔨	2	4	2	2	0	1	X	X	11
Newfoundland and Labrador (Ryan)	0	0	0	0	1	0	X	X	1

Sheet 2	1	2	3	4	5	6	7	8	Final
Ontario (Cochrane) 🔨	0	2	2	0	2	2	X	X	8
New Brunswick (Odishaw)	1	0	0	1	0	0	X	X	2

Sheet 3	1	2	3	4	5	6	7	8	Final
Northern Ontario (Desilets)	0	1	0	0	2	0	X	X	3
Quebec (Roberge) 🔨	3	0	1	5	0	2	X	X	11

Sheet 4	1	2	3	4	5	6	7	8	Final
British Columbia (Buchy)	0	0	2	0	0	1	0	X	3
Saskatchewan (McKee) 🔨	0	2	0	1	3	0	4	X	10

=== Playoffs ===
Semifinals
1	Alberta	11
4	Saskatchewan	2
2	Ontario	8
3	Quebec	4

Final
1	Alberta	4
2	Ontario	3

Bronze medal game
4	Saskatchewan	8
3	Quebec	4

==== Semifinals ====
Saturday, December 11, 10:30 am

Sheet 2	1	2	3	4	5	6	7	8	Final
Ontario (Cochrane) 🔨	0	2	0	0	3	1	0	2	8
Quebec (Roberge)	0	0	1	1	0	0	2	0	4

Sheet 3	1	2	3	4	5	6	7	8	Final
Alberta (White) 🔨	4	1	1	1	0	4	X	X	11
Saskatchewan (McKee)	0	0	0	0	2	0	X	X	2

==== Bronze medal game ====
Saturday, December 11, 3:30 pm

Sheet 7	1	2	3	4	5	6	7	8	Final
Saskatchewan (McKee)	2	0	2	3	0	1	0	X	8
Quebec (Roberge) 🔨	0	1	0	0	2	0	1	X	4

==== Gold medal game ====
Saturday, December 11, 3:30 pm

Sheet 6	1	2	3	4	5	6	7	8	Final
Alberta (White) 🔨	1	0	1	0	0	1	0	1	4
Ontario (Cochrane)	0	1	0	1	0	0	1	0	3

== Women ==
=== Teams ===
The teams are listed as follows:

Team	Skip	Third	Second	Lead	Club
Alberta	Cheryl Bernard	Carolyn McRorie	Laine Peters	Karen Ruus	The Glencoe Club, Calgary
British Columbia	Mary-Anne Arsenault	Penny Shantz	Diane Gushulak	Grace MacInnes	Royal City CC, New Westminster
Manitoba	Kim Link	Colleen Kilgallen	Karen Fallis	Renee Fletcher	East St. Paul CC, East St. Paul
New Brunswick	Sandy Comeau	Shelley Thomas	Judy Blanchard	Carol Justason	Curl Moncton, Moncton
Newfoundland and Labrador	Laura Phillips	Sandra Sparrow	Heather Martin	Candy Thomas	RE/MAX Centre, St. John's
Northern Ontario	Stacey Szajewski	Hayley Smith	Donna Queen	Susan Cain	Keewatin CC, Kenora
Northwest Territories	Sharon Cormier	Cheryl Tordoff	Marta Moir	Norma Jarvis	Yellowknife CC, Yellowknife
Nova Scotia	Theresa Breen	Mary-Sue Radford	Julie McMullin	Helen Radford	Halifax CC, Halifax
Nunavut	Geneva Chislett	Diane North	Robyn Mackey	Denise Hutchings	Iqaluit CC, Iqaluit
Ontario	Sherry Middaugh	Karri-Lee Grant	Christine Loube	Jane Hooper-Perroud	The Thornhill Club, Vaughan
Prince Edward Island	Kim Dolan	Susan McInnis	Kathy O'Rourke	Julie Scales	Cornwall CC, Cornwall
Quebec	Isabelle Néron	Ginette Simard	Nathalie Audet	Sonia Delisle	CC Chicoutimi, Chicoutimi; CC St-Lambert, Saint-Lambert; CC Victoria, Sainte-Foy
Saskatchewan	Sherry Anderson	Patty Hersikorn	Brenda Goertzen	Anita Silvernagle	Nutana CC, Saskatoon
Yukon	Rhonda Horte	Helen Strong	Laura Wilson	Corinne Delaire	Whitehorse CC, Whitehorse

=== Round-robin standings ===
Final round-robin standings

Key
Teams to Championship Pool

Pool A	Skip	W	L	W–L
Quebec	Isabelle Néron	5	1	–
Saskatchewan	Sherry Anderson	4	2	2–0
Manitoba	Kim Link	4	2	1–1
British Columbia	Mary-Anne Arsenault	4	2	0–2
Prince Edward Island	Kim Dolan	3	3	–
Northern Ontario	Stacey Szajewski	1	5	–
Nunavut	Geneva Chislett	0	6	–

Pool B	Skip	W	L	W–L
Ontario	Sherry Middaugh	5	1	1–0
Nova Scotia	Theresa Breen	5	1	0–1
Alberta	Cheryl Bernard	4	2	–
Yukon	Rhonda Horte	3	3	–
Newfoundland and Labrador	Laura Phillips	2	4	–
New Brunswick	Sandy Comeau	1	5	1–0
Northwest Territories	Sharon Cormier	1	5	0–1

=== Round-robin results ===
All draws are listed in Eastern Time (UTC−05:00).

==== Draw 1 ====
Monday, December 6, 8:30 am

Sheet 3	1	2	3	4	5	6	7	8	Final
Quebec (Néron)	0	0	1	1	0	3	0	0	5
British Columbia (Arsenault) 🔨	0	1	0	0	3	0	0	2	6

Sheet 4	1	2	3	4	5	6	7	8	Final
New Brunswick (Comeau)	0	0	1	0	1	0	2	X	4
Yukon (Horte) 🔨	0	2	0	3	0	2	0	X	7

==== Draw 2 ====
Monday, December 6, 12:00 pm

Sheet 3	1	2	3	4	5	6	7	8	Final
Nova Scotia (Breen) 🔨	1	0	0	2	3	2	X	X	8
Alberta (Bernard)	0	1	1	0	0	0	X	X	2

Sheet 5	1	2	3	4	5	6	7	8	Final
Nunavut (Chislett)	0	1	0	0	1	0	X	X	2
Saskatchewan (Anderson) 🔨	3	0	1	1	0	4	X	X	9

Sheet 7	1	2	3	4	5	6	7	8	Final
Newfoundland and Labrador (Phillips) 🔨	0	0	2	0	1	0	0	1	4
Ontario (Middaugh)	0	0	0	2	0	2	1	0	5

Sheet 8	1	2	3	4	5	6	7	8	Final
Manitoba (Link) 🔨	0	1	1	1	0	2	2	X	7
Northern Ontario (Szajewski)	1	0	0	0	1	0	0	X	2

==== Draw 3 ====
Monday, December 6, 4:00 pm

Sheet 1	1	2	3	4	5	6	7	8	Final
New Brunswick (Comeau)	1	0	1	0	0	1	0	X	3
Ontario (Middaugh) 🔨	0	1	0	3	0	0	2	X	6

Sheet 3	1	2	3	4	5	6	7	8	Final
Northern Ontario (Szajewski)	0	0	0	0	0	0	X	X	0
Prince Edward Island (Dolan) 🔨	3	0	1	2	1	2	X	X	9

Sheet 5	1	2	3	4	5	6	7	8	Final
Northwest Territories (Cormier)	0	0	0	0	1	0	X	X	1
Nova Scotia (Breen) 🔨	1	3	2	2	0	1	X	X	9

Sheet 7	1	2	3	4	5	6	7	8	Final
Quebec (Néron)	1	0	2	0	1	0	0	1	5
Saskatchewan (Anderson) 🔨	0	1	0	1	0	1	1	0	4

==== Draw 4 ====
Monday, December 6, 8:30 pm

Sheet 1	1	2	3	4	5	6	7	8	Final
Alberta (Bernard) 🔨	1	1	0	3	2	1	X	X	8
Northwest Territories (Cormier)	0	0	1	0	0	0	X	X	1

Sheet 5	1	2	3	4	5	6	7	8	Final
Prince Edward Island (Dolan)	0	2	0	0	1	0	2	X	5
Manitoba (Link) 🔨	1	0	1	3	0	3	0	X	8

Sheet 6	1	2	3	4	5	6	7	8	Final
Newfoundland and Labrador (Phillips)	1	0	1	1	0	1	0	2	6
Yukon (Horte) 🔨	0	1	0	0	3	0	1	0	5

Sheet 7	1	2	3	4	5	6	7	8	Final
Nunavut (Chislett)	0	0	0	1	0	1	X	X	2
British Columbia (Arsenault) 🔨	3	1	1	0	3	0	X	X	8

==== Draw 5 ====
Tuesday, December 7, 8:30 am

Sheet 2	1	2	3	4	5	6	7	8	Final
Ontario (Middaugh) 🔨	1	0	1	1	0	0	2	3	8
Nova Scotia (Breen)	0	1	0	0	1	2	0	0	4

Sheet 4	1	2	3	4	5	6	7	8	Final
Saskatchewan (Anderson)	4	0	2	0	1	1	0	X	8
Northern Ontario (Szajewski) 🔨	0	2	0	1	0	0	1	X	4

==== Draw 6 ====
Tuesday, December 7, 12:00 pm

Sheet 1	1	2	3	4	5	6	7	8	Final
Quebec (Néron) 🔨	3	1	0	4	1	0	0	X	9
Prince Edward Island (Dolan)	0	0	1	0	0	3	1	X	5

Sheet 2	1	2	3	4	5	6	7	8	Final
New Brunswick (Comeau)	0	2	0	1	0	1	0	2	6
Northwest Territories (Cormier) 🔨	1	0	1	0	2	0	0	0	4

Sheet 5	1	2	3	4	5	6	7	8	Final
Yukon (Horte) 🔨	1	0	0	0	1	2	0	1	5
Alberta (Bernard)	0	1	1	1	0	0	1	0	4

Sheet 6	1	2	3	4	5	6	7	8	Final
Manitoba (Link)	0	0	0	0	2	0	3	1	6
British Columbia (Arsenault) 🔨	0	1	1	2	0	1	0	0	5

==== Draw 7 ====
Tuesday, December 7, 4:00 pm

Sheet 1	1	2	3	4	5	6	7	8	Final
Nunavut (Chislett)	0	0	0	0	2	2	0	X	4
Manitoba (Link) 🔨	0	3	3	3	0	0	1	X	10

Sheet 2	1	2	3	4	5	6	7	8	Final
Alberta (Bernard) 🔨	0	2	1	0	0	0	3	X	6
Newfoundland and Labrador (Phillips)	0	0	0	1	1	0	0	X	2

Sheet 4	1	2	3	4	5	6	7	8	Final
Ontario (Middaugh)	0	3	1	2	0	4	X	X	10
Northwest Territories (Cormier) 🔨	2	0	0	0	2	0	X	X	4

Sheet 6	1	2	3	4	5	6	7	8	Final
Prince Edward Island (Dolan) 🔨	0	0	2	0	1	2	0	1	6
Saskatchewan (Anderson)	0	1	0	1	0	0	1	0	3

==== Draw 8 ====
Tuesday, December 7, 8:00 pm

Sheet 1	1	2	3	4	5	6	7	8	Final
Yukon (Horte) 🔨	1	0	1	0	0	0	0	X	2
Nova Scotia (Breen)	0	1	0	4	2	1	1	X	9

Sheet 2	1	2	3	4	5	6	7	8	Final
British Columbia (Arsenault)	0	2	3	2	1	0	X	X	8
Northern Ontario (Szajewski) 🔨	1	0	0	0	0	1	X	X	2

Sheet 5	1	2	3	4	5	6	7	8	Final
Newfoundland and Labrador (Phillips)	0	3	1	2	1	0	0	1	8
New Brunswick (Comeau) 🔨	3	0	0	0	0	2	1	0	6

Sheet 6	1	2	3	4	5	6	7	8	Final
Quebec (Néron)	2	0	0	1	0	4	0	X	7
Nunavut (Chislett) 🔨	0	1	1	0	1	0	1	X	4

==== Draw 9 ====
Wednesday, December 8, 8:30 am

Sheet 2	1	2	3	4	5	6	7	8	Final
Prince Edward Island (Dolan)	3	0	0	0	3	0	1	X	7
Nunavut (Chislett) 🔨	0	0	0	0	0	1	0	X	1

Sheet 3	1	2	3	4	5	6	7	8	Final
Northwest Territories (Cormier)	1	1	0	2	1	3	X	X	8
Newfoundland and Labrador (Phillips) 🔨	0	0	1	0	0	0	X	X	1

==== Draw 10 ====
Wednesday, December 8, 12:00 pm

Sheet 1	1	2	3	4	5	6	7	8	Final
Saskatchewan (Anderson)	0	1	4	2	1	3	X	X	11
British Columbia (Arsenault) 🔨	2	0	0	0	0	0	X	X	2

Sheet 3	1	2	3	4	5	6	7	8	Final
Yukon (Horte)	0	1	0	1	0	0	0	X	2
Ontario (Middaugh) 🔨	1	0	1	0	1	1	2	X	6

Sheet 5	1	2	3	4	5	6	7	8	Final
Northern Ontario (Szajewski)	0	0	0	1	0	0	X	X	1
Quebec (Néron) 🔨	2	4	1	0	1	1	X	X	9

Sheet 7	1	2	3	4	5	6	7	8	Final
Nova Scotia (Breen) 🔨	2	0	0	2	0	2	2	X	8
New Brunswick (Comeau)	0	1	1	0	1	0	0	X	3

==== Draw 11 ====
Wednesday, December 8, 4:00 pm

Sheet 2	1	2	3	4	5	6	7	8	Final
Manitoba (Link)	0	0	1	0	2	0	X	X	3
Quebec (Néron) 🔨	1	3	0	1	0	1	X	X	6

Sheet 4	1	2	3	4	5	6	7	8	Final
Nova Scotia (Breen) 🔨	1	0	2	0	1	0	3	0	7
Newfoundland and Labrador (Phillips)	0	1	0	3	0	1	0	1	6

Sheet 6	1	2	3	4	5	6	7	8	Final
Alberta (Bernard)	0	3	0	0	2	2	0	X	7
New Brunswick (Comeau) 🔨	1	0	0	1	0	0	1	X	3

Sheet 8	1	2	3	4	5	6	7	8	Final
Northern Ontario (Szajewski) 🔨	0	1	2	0	1	0	3	X	7
Nunavut (Chislett)	1	0	0	1	0	1	0	X	3

==== Draw 12 ====
Wednesday, December 8, 8:00 pm

Sheet 3	1	2	3	4	5	6	7	8	Final
Saskatchewan (Anderson)	0	2	0	2	0	2	0	2	8
Manitoba (Link) 🔨	2	0	1	0	1	0	1	0	5

Sheet 4	1	2	3	4	5	6	7	8	Final
British Columbia (Arsenault) 🔨	1	0	0	4	1	2	1	X	9
Prince Edward Island (Dolan)	0	2	2	0	0	0	0	X	4

Sheet 7	1	2	3	4	5	6	7	8	Final
Northwest Territories (Cormier)	2	0	0	0	0	0	X	X	2
Yukon (Horte) 🔨	0	3	1	1	2	2	X	X	9

Sheet 8	1	2	3	4	5	6	7	8	Final
Ontario (Middaugh) 🔨	0	0	2	0	1	1	1	X	5
Alberta (Bernard)	3	0	0	5	0	0	0	X	8

=== Placement round ===
==== Seeding pool ====
===== Standings =====
Final Seeding Pool Standings

Team	Skip	W	L	W–L
Newfoundland and Labrador	Laura Phillips	5	4	1–0
Prince Edward Island	Kim Dolan	5	4	0–1
Northern Ontario	Stacey Szajewski	3	6	–
New Brunswick	Sandy Comeau	2	7	–
Nunavut	Geneva Chislett	1	8	1–0
Northwest Territories	Sharon Cormier	1	8	0–1

===== Results =====
====== Draw 13 ======
Thursday, December 9, 8:30 am

Sheet 3	1	2	3	4	5	6	7	8	Final
Prince Edward Island (Dolan)	0	0	6	2	0	1	X	X	9
Northwest Territories (Cormier) 🔨	1	0	0	0	2	0	X	X	3

Sheet 5	1	2	3	4	5	6	7	8	Final
Newfoundland and Labrador (Phillips)	1	0	2	1	0	2	0	X	6
Nunavut (Chislett) 🔨	0	2	0	0	0	0	1	X	3

Sheet 7	1	2	3	4	5	6	7	8	Final
New Brunswick (Comeau) 🔨	0	0	0	1	0	2	1	0	4
Northern Ontario (Szajewski)	0	2	1	0	1	0	0	1	5

====== Draw 15 ======
Thursday, December 9, 3:30 pm

Sheet 3	1	2	3	4	5	6	7	8	Final
Northern Ontario (Szajewski)	0	0	1	0	0	1	X	X	2
Newfoundland and Labrador (Phillips) 🔨	1	2	0	5	1	0	X	X	9

Sheet 5	1	2	3	4	5	6	7	8	Final
New Brunswick (Comeau) 🔨	2	0	0	1	1	0	1	0	5
Prince Edward Island (Dolan)	0	2	1	0	0	2	0	1	6

Sheet 7	1	2	3	4	5	6	7	8	Final
Northwest Territories (Cormier) 🔨	1	1	0	0	0	2	0	1	5
Nunavut (Chislett)	0	0	3	1	1	0	1	0	6

====== Draw 17 ======
Friday, December 10, 10:00 am

Sheet 2	1	2	3	4	5	6	7	8	9	Final
Newfoundland and Labrador (Phillips)	0	3	0	0	1	2	1	2	1	10
Prince Edward Island (Dolan) 🔨	3	0	3	3	0	0	0	0	0	9

Sheet 4	1	2	3	4	5	6	7	8	Final
Nunavut (Chislett) 🔨	1	0	1	0	0	0	2	0	4
New Brunswick (Comeau)	0	3	0	1	0	1	0	2	7

Sheet 6	1	2	3	4	5	6	7	8	Final
Northwest Territories (Cormier)	0	0	1	0	2	0	1	0	4
Northern Ontario (Szajewski) 🔨	0	3	0	1	0	1	0	2	7

==== Championship pool ====
===== Standings =====
Final Championship Pool Standings

Team	Skip	W	L	W–L
Saskatchewan	Sherry Anderson	8	2	1–0
British Columbia	Mary-Anne Arsenault	8	2	0–1
Nova Scotia	Theresa Breen	7	3	–
Alberta	Cheryl Bernard	6	4	3–0
Quebec	Isabelle Néron	6	4	1–2
Ontario	Sherry Middaugh	6	4	1–2
Manitoba	Kim Link	6	4	1–2
Yukon	Rhonda Horte	3	7	–

===== Results =====
====== Draw 14 ======
Thursday, December 9, 12:00 pm

Sheet 1	1	2	3	4	5	6	7	8	Final
Saskatchewan (Anderson)	0	1	2	0	2	0	1	X	6
Nova Scotia (Breen) 🔨	0	0	0	1	0	1	0	X	2

Sheet 2	1	2	3	4	5	6	7	8	9	Final
Quebec (Néron)	0	0	3	0	0	1	0	2	0	6
Ontario (Middaugh) 🔨	0	1	0	3	0	0	2	0	2	8

Sheet 3	1	2	3	4	5	6	7	8	Final
British Columbia (Arsenault)	1	1	0	2	0	2	0	1	7
Yukon (Horte) 🔨	0	0	1	0	2	0	1	0	4

Sheet 4	1	2	3	4	5	6	7	8	9	Final
Manitoba (Link) 🔨	3	0	1	0	2	0	0	3	0	9
Alberta (Bernard)	0	1	0	4	0	3	1	0	1	10

====== Draw 16 ======
Thursday, December 9, 7:00 pm

Sheet 5	1	2	3	4	5	6	7	8	Final
Saskatchewan (Anderson) 🔨	0	1	1	0	0	2	0	1	5
Ontario (Middaugh)	0	0	0	1	0	0	1	0	2

Sheet 6	1	2	3	4	5	6	7	8	Final
British Columbia (Arsenault) 🔨	2	0	1	0	3	1	2	X	9
Alberta (Bernard)	0	1	0	1	0	0	0	X	2

Sheet 7	1	2	3	4	5	6	7	8	Final
Quebec (Néron) 🔨	2	0	2	0	1	0	1	1	7
Nova Scotia (Breen)	0	2	0	3	0	3	0	0	8

Sheet 8	1	2	3	4	5	6	7	8	Final
Manitoba (Link)	1	0	4	0	2	0	0	X	7
Yukon (Horte) 🔨	0	0	0	1	0	1	1	X	3

====== Draw 18 ======
Friday, December 10, 2:00 pm

Sheet 1	1	2	3	4	5	6	7	8	Final
Alberta (Bernard) 🔨	1	1	0	2	0	2	0	0	6
Quebec (Néron)	0	0	1	0	2	0	1	1	5

Sheet 2	1	2	3	4	5	6	7	8	Final
Yukon (Horte)	0	2	0	1	0	2	0	0	5
Saskatchewan (Anderson) 🔨	2	0	1	0	1	0	0	3	7

Sheet 3	1	2	3	4	5	6	7	8	9	Final
Ontario (Middaugh) 🔨	2	0	1	1	0	2	0	0	0	6
Manitoba (Link)	0	3	0	0	1	0	1	1	2	8

Sheet 4	1	2	3	4	5	6	7	8	Final
Nova Scotia (Breen) 🔨	0	0	0	2	0	1	0	X	3
British Columbia (Arsenault)	1	2	1	0	2	0	2	X	8

====== Draw 19 ======
Friday, December 10, 7:00 pm

Sheet 5	1	2	3	4	5	6	7	8	Final
Yukon (Horte)	0	1	1	0	0	2	1	X	5
Quebec (Néron) 🔨	4	0	0	2	1	0	0	X	7

Sheet 6	1	2	3	4	5	6	7	8	Final
Nova Scotia (Breen) 🔨	2	0	0	1	1	1	3	X	8
Manitoba (Link)	0	0	2	0	0	0	0	X	2

Sheet 7	1	2	3	4	5	6	7	8	Final
Alberta (Bernard)	0	1	0	2	0	2	0	X	5
Saskatchewan (Anderson) 🔨	1	0	3	0	2	0	2	X	8

Sheet 8	1	2	3	4	5	6	7	8	Final
Ontario (Middaugh)	0	1	0	0	1	1	0	X	3
British Columbia (Arsenault) 🔨	2	0	1	3	0	0	1	X	7

=== Playoffs ===
Semifinals
1	Saskatchewan	6
4	Alberta	3
2	British Columbia	6
3	Nova Scotia	4

Final
1	Saskatchewan	10
2	British Columbia	4

Bronze medal game
4	Alberta	2
3	Nova Scotia	9

==== Semifinals ====
Saturday, December 11, 10:30 am

Sheet 6	1	2	3	4	5	6	7	8	Final
Saskatchewan (Anderson) 🔨	1	0	2	2	1	0	0	X	6
Alberta (Bernard)	0	1	0	0	0	1	1	X	3

Sheet 7	1	2	3	4	5	6	7	8	Final
British Columbia (Arsenault) 🔨	1	0	1	0	3	0	1	X	6
Nova Scotia (Breen)	0	1	0	1	0	2	0	X	4

==== Bronze medal game ====
Saturday, December 11, 3:30 pm

Sheet 2	1	2	3	4	5	6	7	8	Final
Alberta (Bernard)	0	0	0	0	1	1	0	X	2
Nova Scotia (Breen) 🔨	1	1	1	1	0	0	5	X	9

==== Gold medal game ====
Saturday, December 11, 3:30 pm

Sheet 3	1	2	3	4	5	6	7	8	Final
Saskatchewan (Anderson) 🔨	0	1	0	2	1	0	3	3	10
British Columbia (Arsenault)	0	0	2	0	0	2	0	0	4
