= Marc Johnson =

Marc Johnson may refer to:

== Musicians ==
- Marc Johnson (jazz musician) (born 1953), American jazz musician
- Marc Johnson (rapper) (born 1979), Danish rapper known as Johnson
- Marc Johnson, cello player with the Vermeer Quartet
- Marc Johnson, member of the thrash-metal band Executioner

== Other people ==
- Marc Johnson (academic) (born 1948), American agricultural economist and academic administrator
- Marc Johnson (skateboarder) (1977–2026), American professional skateboarder
- Pierre Marc Johnson (born 1946), Canadian politician in Quebec

== See also ==
- Mark Johnson (disambiguation)
- Marcus Johnson (disambiguation)
