= Mark Johnston =

Mark Johnston may refer to:

- Mark Johnston (racehorse trainer) (born 1959), Scottish racehorse trainer
- Mark Johnston (historian) (born 1960), Australian historian, teacher and author
- Mark Johnston (American football) (born 1938), American football cornerback
- Mark Johnston (swimmer) (born 1979), freestyle swimmer from Canada
- Mark Johnston (philosopher), Australian philosopher
- Mark T. Johnston (born 1970), jockey in thoroughbred horse racing
- J. Mark Johnston (born 1962), member of the South Dakota Senate

== See also ==
- Mark Johnson (disambiguation)
