= Marcus Johnson =

Marcus Johnson may refer to:

== Politics ==
- Marcus E. Johnson (1887–1947), American politician, member of the Wisconsin State Assembly in 1919
- Marcus Theodore Johnson (fl. 1936–1939), British businessman and member of the Legislative Council of Hong Kong

== Sports ==
- Marcus Johnson (offensive lineman) (born 1981), American NFL player
- Marcus Johnson (wide receiver) (born 1994), American NFL player
- Marcus Johnson (boxer) (born 1973), American boxer who fought Taurus Sykes
- Marcus Johnson Jr. (born 1995), American basketball player

== Other uses ==
- Marcus Johnson (jazz musician), American jazz musician, producer and entrepreneur
- Marcus Johnson (actor), featured in Redemption: The Stan Tookie Williams Story, The Condemned and Deacons for Defense

== See also ==
- Marc Johnson (disambiguation)
- Marques Johnson (born 1956), American basketball player
- Marquis Johnson (born 1988), American football player
- Marquis Johnson (wide receiver) (born 2004), American football player
