= Matthew Blandford =

Canadian curler (born 1985)

- Curler
- Born: April 16, 1985 (age 41); Stephenville, Newfoundland and Labrador

Team
- Curling club: Royal City CC, New Westminster
- Skip: Matthew Blandford
- Third: Cameron de Jong
- Second: Sébastien Robillard
- Lead: Cody Johnston
- Mixed doubles partner: Darah Blandford

Curling career
- Member Association: Newfoundland and Labrador (2003–2011); Alberta (2011–2015; 2016–2018); Yukon (2015–2016); British Columbia (2018–present)
- Top CTRS ranking: 16th (2025–26)

Matthew Blandford (born April 16, 1985) is a Canadian curler currently residing in Cold Lake, Alberta. He is originally from Stephenville, Newfoundland and Labrador, and is a three-time Newfoundland and Labrador junior champion. He currently skips his own team out of Vancouver, British Columbia.

== Career ==
Blandford started his curling career as a junior curler in Newfoundland and Labrador. He was the provincial junior champion three times, and represented Newfoundland and Labrador at the Canadian Junior Championships three times. He finished in tenth place in 2003, finished as the runner-up in 2004, and finished tied for fourth at the 2005. Blandford played at the Newfoundland and Labrador provincial men's championship as skip in 2006, eventually losing in a tie breaker . Blandford played at the Newfoundland and Labrador provincial men's championship as third under Dean Branton in 2009, but finished tied second to last. He skipped a team at the 2010 Newfoundland Tankard, and lost in a tiebreaker. He however beat the Brad Gushue rink in the round robin, making him the last skip (as of 2020) to beat Gushue at the Newfoundland Tankard.

Blandford then moved to Alberta, and first played in the provincial championship in 2012. Blandford was eliminated in the knockout stages in the Alberta provincials in 2012 and 2013, but was able to qualify for the playoffs in the 2014 provincials through the B qualifier. He was defeated in the page playoffs by Kevin Martin, and was eliminated in the semifinal by Kevin Koe, finishing in third overall.

Blandford was invited to skip the Wade Scoffin rink for the 2016 Yukon Men's Curling Championship, where they finished second, losing to Bob Smallwood 9-6 in the final.

Blandford would then move to British Columbia after his season in Yukon, and would qualify for the BC provincial championships when he qualified for the 2025 BC Men's Curling Championship, curling third for the Brent Pierce rink. At the 2025 provincials, the rink finished 2-3 and failed to qualify for the playoffs. After Pierce announced he would be leaving British Columbia to curl with Saskatchewan's Dustin Kalthoff rink, Blandford skipped a new team out of Vancouver for the 2025-26 season alongside Sébastien Robillard, Cody Johnston, and Matthew Fenton. The team would start off strong, finishing second at the 2025 Saville Shootout, losing to Cameron de Jong in the final.

== Personal life ==
Blandford works as an artificial lift technician at Imperial Oil. He went to high school at Booth Memorial High School, and attended university at the College of the North Atlantic.
