= Mark Johnson (curler) =

American-Canadian curler

- Curler
- Born: September 6, 1958 (age 68); Walla Walla, Washington, U.S.

Curling career
- Brier: 1 (2006)
Medal record
Men's curling
Representing Canada
World Senior Curling Championships
Gold medal – first place	2011 St. Paul

Mark Johnson (born September 6, 1958, in Walla Walla, Washington) is an American-Canadian curler from Edmonton, Alberta. He is a former World Senior Curling Champion.

== Career ==
Johnson has curled competitively in both Canada and the United States. In the mid-2000s, he skipped one of the top teams in Alberta. In 2006, he lost to Kevin Martin in the provincial final. He was asked by Martin to play as the team's alternate at the 2006 Tim Hortons Brier, in which Johnson played two games.

In 2009, Johnson skipped a Seattle-based team at the 2010 United States Olympic Curling Trials. The team placed 4–5.

On turning 50, Johnson became a senior aged curler, and played in his first Canadian Senior Curling Championships in 2010. His Alberta team defeated Ontario in the final. This qualified Johnson to represent Canada at the 2011 World Senior Curling Championships. At the 2011 Seniors, Johnson led Canada to gold medal, defeating the United States in the final, 5–4.

Despite having won the World Senior Curling Championships for Canada in 2011, Johnson's 2012-13 curling season team was based out of Seattle.

In 2013, Johnson was the chairman for the 2013 Tim Hortons Brier in Edmonton, Alberta.
