= Wade White =

Canadian curler

Medal record

Men's Curling

Representing Canada

World Senior Curling Championships
Gold medal – first place	2018 Östersund	
Gold medal – first place	2022 Geneva	

Wade White (born c. 1962) is a Canadian curler. He currently skips (captains) his own team based in Alberta, Canada. White is a two-time winner of the world senior men's curling championship, in 2018 and 2022.

== Early life ==
White was raised in Preeceville, Saskatchewan with his brother George. He has lived in Hinton and currently resides in Stony Plain, Alberta.

== Curling career ==
White has won the now-discontinued Trans-Canada Telephone Employees curling championship for Alberta four times, including 2004

White and his team won the gold medal in the 2013 Alberta Senior Curling Championships; the gold in 2017 Canadian Senior Curling Championships; the gold in the 2017 Alberta Senior Provincial Curling Championships; and the gold in the 2018 World Senior Curling Championships, where his team beat the defending champion Sweden by six points and earned Canada's first gold in that competition since 2014. He competed in the 2019 Canadian Senior Curling Championships, where his team won a bronze. He won a second Canadian Seniors title at the 2021 Canadian Senior Curling Championships. In 2022 he repeated his world senior men's curling championship win, with a team curling out of the Lac la Biche Curling Club, in Alberta.

White trains out of the Saville Community Sports Centre in Edmonton, Canada.
