= Robert Schlender =

Canadian curler

- Curler
- Born: January 29, 1972 (age 54)

Team
- Curling club: Airdrie Curling Club; Airdrie, Alberta

Robert "Rob" Schlender (born January 29, 1972, in Millet, Alberta) is a Canadian curler from Sherwood Park, Alberta.

== Career ==
Schlender skipped Alberta in two Canadian Junior Curling Championships, in 1990 and 1991. At the 1990 Canadian Junior Curling Championships, the team finished with a 5–6 record, missing the playoffs. At the 1991 Canadian Junior Curling Championships, the team lost in the final to Northern Ontario's Jason Repay. He also skipped Team Alberta in the 1991 Canada Winter Games in PEI where they received the Silver Medal with a 5–0 record in round robin and lost the final to Manitoba (James Kirkness).

Schlender has played in three provincial championships. On the World Curling Tour, he won several spiels over the years which includes the 1991 Northern Alberta Curling Association Bonspiel, 1992 Kelowna Cashspiel, 1993 Drayton Valley Classic, Red Deer in 1997 & 2003, The Shoot-Out in 2006, the Wainwright Roaming Buffalo Classic in 2010 and the 2011 Twin Anchors Invitational. Schlender has competed in 4 World Curling Tour Player Championships.

== Personal life ==
Schlender is a management consultant.
