= Jamie King (curler) =

Canadian curler

- Curler
- Born: November 21, 1973 (age 52); Edmonton, Alberta

Team
- Curling club: Saville Community SC, Edmonton, AB
- Skip: Jamie King
- Third: Mike Jantzen
- Second: Sean Morris
- Lead: Todd Brick

Curling career
- Brier: 3 (2010, 2014, 2015)
- World Championship: 2 (2010, 2014)
- Top CTRS ranking: 15th (2003-04 & 2006–07)
Medal record
Representing Canada
Men's curling
World Curling Championships
Gold medal – first place	2010 Cortina d'Ampezzo
Representing Alberta
Tim Hortons Brier
Gold medal – first place	2010 Halifax
Gold medal – first place	2014 Kamloops

Jamie King (born November 21, 1973, in Edmonton, Alberta) is a Canadian curler.

King was the alternate for the Kevin Koe rink in 2010, where he won 2010 Tim Hortons Brier and 2010 Capital One World Men's Curling Championship. King played in just two games at the World Championships, against Denmark and Japan. For much of that season, King skipped his own Edmonton-based rink. Following the season, King joined the Warren Hassall rink as third, and then skipped the rink the following season. In 2012, King left the team to form a new team with Blake MacDonald, Scott Pfeifer and Jeff Erickson.

Outside of curling, King is the Senior Vice President of Credit with Servus Credit Union.
