= 2011 World Financial Group Classic =

World Curling Tour event

- Host city: Calgary, Alberta
- Arena: Calgary Curling Club
- Dates: November 11–13
- Winner: (Alberta) Brock Virtue
- Curling club: Calgary, Alberta
- Skip: Brock Virtue
- Third: J. D. Lind
- Second: Charley Thomas
- Lead: Dominic Daemen
- Finalist: (Alberta) Tom Appelman

The 2011 World Financial Group Classic was held from November 11 to 13 at the Calgary Curling Club in Calgary, Alberta as part of the 2011–12 World Curling Tour. The purse for the event was CAD$24,000, and the event was held in a round robin format.

== Teams ==
The teams are listed as follows:

Skip	Third	Second	Lead	Locale
Tom Appelman	Adam Enright	Brandon Klassen	Nathan Connolly	Edmonton, Alberta
Brent Bawel	Mike Jantzen	Sean O'Connor	Hardi Sulimma	Calgary, Alberta
Scott Bitz	Mark Lang	Aryn Schmidt	Dean Hicke	Regina, Saskatchewan
Matthew Blandford	Tom Sallows	Mike Westlund	Chris Sanford	Cold Lake, Alberta
Brendan Bottcher	Bradley Thiessen	Micky Lizmore	Karrick Martin	Edmonton, Alberta
Lloyd Hill (fourth)	Scott Egger (skip)	Ron Smith	Ed Chow	Brooks, Alberta
Albert Gerdung (fourth)	Vance Elder (skip)	Darren Grierson	Trevor Slupski	Brooks, Alberta
Lorne Goodman	Lyle Kent	Ian Jensen	Nathan Relitz	Calgary, Alberta
Josh Lambden	Bert Martin	Chris McDonah	Daniel Bubola	Calgary, Alberta
Matt Lemna	Duane Grierson	Wallace Hollinshead	Mike O'Grady	Calgary, Alberta
Mike Libbus	Mickey Pendergrast	Brad MacInnis	Peter Keenan	Calgary, Alberta
Steve Mackey	Dean Mamer	Ryan O'Connor	Tim Sawatzky	Calgary, Alberta
Darren Moulding	Scott Cruikshank	Shaun Planaden	Kyle Iverson	Red Deer, Alberta
James Pahl	Mark Klinck	Terry Soch	Kevyn McGregor	Edmonton, Alberta
Kevin Park	Shane Park	Aaron Sluchinski	Justin Sluchinski	Edmonton, Alberta
Trevor Perepolkin	Ryan LeDrew	Tyler Orme	Chris Anderson	Vernon, British Columbia
Dan Petryk (fourth)	Steve Petryk (skip)	Colin Hodgson	Brad Chyz	Calgary, Alberta
Kevin Yablonski (fourth)	Jon Rennie (skip)	Harrison Boss	Matthew McDonald	Calgary, Alberta
Dean Ross	Don DeLair	Chris Blackwell	Steve Jensen	Calgary, Alberta
Robert Schlender	Chris Lemishka	Don Bartlett	Darcy Hafso	Edmonton, Alberta
Christof Schwaller	Alexander Attinger	Robert Hürlimann	Felix Attinger	Switzerland
Brock Virtue	J. D. Lind	Charley Thomas	Dominic Daemen	Calgary, Alberta
Jessi Wilkinson	Neal Woloschuk	Cody Bartlett	Curtis Der	Edmonton, Alberta
Matt Willerton	Jeremy Hodges	Paul Strandlund	Craig MacAlpine	Edmonton, Alberta

== Round robin standings ==
Pool A	W	L
(Alberta) Matthew Blandford	4	1
(Alberta) Dean Ross	3	2
(Alberta) Brendan Bottcher	3	2
(Alberta) Robert Schlender	3	2
(Alberta) Josh Lambden	2	3
(Alberta) Matt Willerton	0	5

Pool B	W	L
(Alberta) Tom Appelmann	4	1
(Alberta) Brock Virtue	4	1
(Alberta) Matt Lemna	2	3
(Alberta) Mike Libbus	2	3
(Alberta) Steve Mackey	2	3
(Alberta) Scott Egger	1	4

Pool C	W	L
(Saskatchewan) Scott Bitz	4	1
(Alberta) Darren Moulding	4	1
(Alberta) James Pahl	3	2
(Alberta) Steve Petryk	3	2
(Alberta) Jon Rennie	1	4
(Alberta) Jessi Wilkinson	0	5

Pool D	W	L
(British Columbia) Trevor Perepolkin	5	0
(Alberta) Kevin Park	4	1
(Switzerland) Christof Schwaller	3	2
(Alberta) Vance Elder	2	3
(Alberta) Lorne Goodman	1	4
(Alberta) Brent Bawel	0	5

== Playoffs ==
Quarterfinals
(Alberta) Matthew Blandford	3
(Alberta) Tom Appelman	6
(Saskatchewan) Scott Bitz	5
(Alberta) Kevin Park	3
(Alberta) Brock Virtue	6
(Alberta) Dean Ross	3
(British Columbia) Trevor Perepolkin	5
(Alberta) Darren Moulding	0

Semifinals
(Alberta) Tom Appelman	6
(Saskatchewan) Scott Bitz	3
(Alberta) Brock Virtue	5
(British Columbia) Trevor Perepolkin	2

Final
(Alberta) Tom Appelman	1
(Alberta) Brock Virtue	6
