= 2011 Victoria Curling Classic Invitational =

World Curling Tour event

- Host city: Victoria, British Columbia
- Arena: Archie Browning Sports Centre
- Dates: March 31-April 3
- Men's winner: (Ontario) Glenn Howard
- Curling club: Coldwater & District CC; Coldwater, Ontario
- Skip: Glenn Howard
- Third: Richard Hart
- Second: Brent Laing
- Lead: Craig Savill
- Finalist: (Alberta) Brock Virtue
- Women's winner: (Manitoba) Jennifer Jones
- Curling club: St. Vital Curling Club; Winnipeg, Manitoba
- Skip: Jennifer Jones
- Third: Kaitlyn Lawes
- Second: Jill Officer
- Lead: Dawn Askin
- Finalist: (Alberta) Shannon Kleibrink

The 2011 Victoria Curling Classic Invitational was held at the Archie Browning Sports Centre in Victoria, British Columbia from March 31 to April 3. There was a men's and women's draw. The men played a triple-knockout tournament to determine 8 quarterfinal spots, while the women played a round-robin tournament in two pools of four, and the top two teams of each pool advanced to the semifinals.

== Men ==
=== Teams ===
Skip	Third	Second	Lead	Locale
Jim Cotter	Ken Maskiewich	Kevin Folk	Rick Sawatsky	(British Columbia) Kelowna/Vernon
Neil Dangerfield	Dennis Sutton	Darren Boden	Rob Iuvale	(British Columbia) Victoria
John Epping	Scott Bailey	Darryl Prebble	Trevor Wall	(Ontario) Toronto
Sean Geall	Ken McArdle	Tyler Klitch	Darren LaFace	(British Columbia) New Westminster
Brad Gushue	Ryan Fry	Geoff Walker	Adam Casey	(Newfoundland and Labrador) St. John's
Glenn Howard	Richard Hart	Brent Laing	Craig Savill	(Ontario) Coldwater
Kevin Koe	Blake MacDonald	Carter Rycroft	Nolan Thiessen	(Alberta) Edmonton
Kevin Martin	John Morris	Marc Kennedy	Ben Hebert	(Alberta) Edmonton
Mike McEwen	B.J. Neufeld	Matt Wozniak	Denni Neufeld	(Manitoba) Winnipeg
Rick McKague	Jim Moats	Steve McKague	Paul Strandlund	(Alberta) Edmonton
Jason Montgomery	Mike Wood	Miles Craig	William Duggan	(British Columbia) Duncan
Braeden Moskowy	Kirk Muyres	Colton Flasch	Matt Lang	(Saskatchewan) Regina
Brent Pierce	Grant Dezura	Kevin Recksiedler	Jeff Richard	(British Columbia) New Westminster
Pat Simmons	Steve Laycock	Brennen Jones	Dallan Muyres	(Saskatchewan) Regina
Naomasa Takeda	Fukuhiro Ohno	Hiromitsu Kuriyama	Shinaya Yoshimoto	(Japan) Aomori
Brock Virtue	JD Lind	Dominic Daemen	Dean Joanisse	(Alberta) Lethbridge

=== Results ===
==== A Event ====
First Knockout		Semifinals		Qualifier 1
(Alberta) Martin	7
(Japan) Takeda	1	(Alberta) Martin	7
(Ontario) Epping	5	(Ontario) Epping	5
(British Columbia) Geall	3			(Alberta) Martin	5
(Newfoundland and Labrador) Gushue	5			(Newfoundland and Labrador) Gushue	1
(Alberta) Virtue	4	(Newfoundland and Labrador) Gushue	6
(Alberta) Koe	5	(Alberta) Koe	3
(Saskatchewan) Moskowy	3

First Knockout		Semifinals		Qualifier 2
(Ontario) Howard	8
(British Columbia) Dangerfield	2	(Ontario) Howard	8
(Saskatchewan) Simmons	8	(Saskatchewan) Simmons	4
(British Columbia) Montgomery	2			(Ontario) Howard	6
(British Columbia) Cotter	9			(Manitoba) McEwen	3
(British Columbia) Pierce	3	(British Columbia) Cotter	3
(Manitoba) McEwen	9	(Manitoba) McEwen	9
(Alberta) McKague	7

==== B Event ====
Second Knockout		Semifinals		Qualifier 3
(Japan) Takeda	3
(British Columbia) Geall	10	(British Columbia) Geall	2
(Alberta) Virtue	8	(Alberta) Virtue	7
(Saskatchewan) Moskowy	3			(Alberta) Virtue	7
				(Manitoba) McEwen	3

Second Knockout		Semifinals		Qualifier 4
(British Columbia) Dangerfield	2
(British Columbia) Montgomery	8	(British Columbia) Montgomery	6
(British Columbia) Pierce	6	(British Columbia) Pierce	5
(Alberta) McKague	5			(British Columbia) Montgomery	2
				(Newfoundland and Labrador) Gushue	8

Second Knockout		Qualifier 5
(Ontario) Epping	3
(Alberta) Koe	7	(Alberta) Koe	3
(Saskatchewan) Simmons	8	(Saskatchewan) Simmons	8
(British Columbia) Cotter	3

==== C Event ====
Third Knockout		Semifinals		Qualifier 6
(Japan) Takeda	1
(Saskatchewan) Moskowy	12	(Saskatchewan) Moskowy	1
		(British Columbia) Cotter	5
				(British Columbia) Cotter	7
				(British Columbia) Montgomery	4

Third Knockout		Semifinals		Qualifier 7
(British Columbia) Dangerfield	8
(Alberta) McKague	1	(British Columbia) Dangerfield	6
		(Ontario) Epping	4
				(British Columbia) Dangerfield	7
				(Manitoba) McEwen	5

Third Knockout		Qualifier 8
(British Columbia) Geall	2
(British Columbia) Pierce	8	(British Columbia) Pierce	4
		(Alberta) Koe	5

=== Playoffs ===
Quarterfinals		Semifinals		Final
(Alberta) Martin	6
(British Columbia) Dangerfield	3	(Alberta) Martin	6
(Alberta) Virtue	6	(Alberta) Virtue	7
(Alberta) Koe	4			(Alberta) Virtue	2
(Ontario) Howard	4			(Ontario) Howard	6
(British Columbia) Cotter	2	(Ontario) Howard	8
(Newfoundland and Labrador) Gushue	4	(Newfoundland and Labrador) Gushue	2
(Saskatchewan) Simmons	1

== Women ==
=== Teams ===
Skip	Third	Second	Lead	Locale
Cheryl Bernard	Susan O'Connor	Carolyn Darbyshire	Cori Morris	(Alberta) Calgary
Jennifer Jones	Kaitlyn Lawes	Jill Officer	Dawn Askin	(Manitoba) Winnipeg
Shannon Kleibrink	Amy Nixon	Bronwen Webster	Chelsey Bell	(Alberta) Calgary
Kelley Law	Jody Maskiewich	Shannon Aleksik	Kristen Recksiedler	(British Columbia) New Westminster
Allison MacInnes	Grace MacInnes	Diane Gushulak	Trysta Vandale	(British Columbia) New Westminster
Marla Mallett	Darah Provencal	Stephanie Jackson	Kelly Shimizu	(British Columbia) New Westminster
Cathy Overton-Clapham	Eve Muirhead	Lori Olson-Johns	Breanne Meakin	(Manitoba) Winnipeg
Sarah Wark	Michelle Allen	Roselyn Craig (skip)	Megan Reid	(British Columbia) Victoria

=== Round Robin ===
==== Standings ====
Pool A	W	L
(Manitoba) Jennifer Jones	3	0
(British Columbia) Roselyn Craig	2	1
(Manitoba) Cathy Overton-Clapham	1	2
(British Columbia) Allison MacInnes	0	3

Pool B	W	L
(Alberta) Shannon Kleibrink	3	0
(Alberta) Cheryl Bernard	2	1
(British Columbia) Kelley Law	1	2
(British Columbia) Marla Mallett	0	3

==== Results ====
Berth	Craig	Jones	MacIn.	Ov-Cl
(British Columbia) Craig		5-6	11-5	10-4
(Manitoba) Jones	6-5		7-2	5-3
(British Columbia) MacInnes	5-11	2-7		1-8
(Manitoba) Overton-Clapham	4-10	3-5	8-1	

Berth	Bern.	Klei.	Law	Mall.
(Alberta) Bernard		2-9	7-3	7-2
(Alberta) Kleibrink	9-2		6-4	5-3
(British Columbia) Law	3-7	4-6		9-4
(British Columbia) Mallett	2-7	3-5	4-9	

=== Playoffs ===
Semifinals
1	(Manitoba) Jones	10
4	(Alberta) Bernard	4
3	(British Columbia) Craig	4
2	(Alberta) Kleibrink	9

Final
(Manitoba) Jones	8
(Alberta) Kleibrink	2
