= Victoria Curling Classic =

Former World Curling Tour event

The Victoria Curling Classic Invitational, also known as the Bear Mountain Arena Curling Classic, was an annual curling bonspiel held at Victoria, British Columbia. It was part of the World Curling Tour. The bonspiel was begun in 2006 and had only a men's tournament until 2010 when a women's tournament was introduced.

The event was last held in 2013 for men and 2012 for women.

== Past champions ==
The past champions for the Victoria Curling Classic Invitational are as follows.

=== Men ===
Year	Winning team	Runner up team	Purse (CAD)
2006	(British Columbia) Bob Ursel, TJ Perepolkin, Brendan Willis, Lance McGinn	(Alberta) John Morris, Kevin Koe, Marc Kennedy, Paul Moffatt	$76,000
2007	(Manitoba) Jeff Stoughton, Ryan Fry, Rob Fowler, Steve Gould	(British Columbia) Greg McAulay, Jay Peachey, Terry Miller, Chad Hoffman	$81,000
2008	(British Columbia) Jim Cotter, Bob Ursel, Kevin Folk, Rick Sawatsky	(Ontario) Wayne Middaugh, Jon Mead, John Epping, Scott Bailey	$81,000
2009	(Ontario) Wayne Middaugh, Jon Mead, John Epping, Scott Bailey	(Manitoba) Mike McEwen, B.J. Neufeld, Matt Wozniak, Denni Neufeld	$81,000
2010	(Alberta) Kevin Martin, John Morris, Marc Kennedy, Ben Hebert	(Ontario) Wayne Middaugh, Jon Mead, John Epping, Scott Bailey	$81,000
2011	(Ontario) Glenn Howard, Richard Hart, Brent Laing, Craig Savill	(Alberta) Brock Virtue, JD Lind, Dominic Daemen, Dean Joanisse	$72,000
2012	(Alberta) Kevin Martin, John Morris, Marc Kennedy, Ben Hebert	(Manitoba) Mike McEwen, B.J. Neufeld, Matt Wozniak, Denni Neufeld	$72,000
2013	(Sweden) Niklas Edin, Sebastian Kraupp, Fredrik Lindberg, Viktor Kjäll	(Manitoba) Mike McEwen, B. J. Neufeld, Matt Wozniak, Denni Neufeld	$76,000

=== Women ===
Year	Winning team	Runner up team	Purse (CAD)
2010	(Alberta) Shannon Kleibrink, Amy Nixon, Bronwen Webster, Chelsey Bell	(Alberta) Cathy King, Kaitlyn Lawes, Raylene Rocque, Tracy Bush	$10,000
2011	(Manitoba) Jennifer Jones, Kaitlyn Lawes, Jill Officer, Dawn Askin	(Alberta) Shannon Kleibrink, Amy Nixon, Bronwen Webster, Chelsey Bell	$18,000
2012	(Manitoba) Chelsea Carey, Kristy McDonald, Kristen Foster, Lindsay Titheridge	(Alberta) Shannon Kleibrink, Carolyn McRorie, Kalynn Park, Cary-Anne Sallows	$18,000
