= Matthew Ng =

Canadian curler

- Curler
- Born: January 4, 1986 (age 40); Calgary, Alberta

Team
- Curling club: Yellowknife Curling Club, Yellowknife
- Skip: Charley Thomas
- Third: Brock Virtue
- Second: J. D. Lind
- Lead: Matthew Ng

Curling career
- Member Association: Alberta (2003–2018; 2020–present); Northwest Territories (2018–2020)
- Brier: 2 (2019, 2020)
Medal record
Men's curling
Representing Canada
World Junior Curling Championships
Gold medal – first place	2006 Jeonju
Gold medal – first place	2007 Eveleth
Representing Alberta
Canada Winter Games
Bronze medal – third place	2003 Bathurst-Campbellton

Matthew "Matt" Ng (born January 4, 1986, in Calgary, Alberta) is a Canadian curler from Calgary, Alberta. He currently plays lead on Team Charley Thomas.

== Career ==
=== Youth ===
Ng was a member of Team Alberta at the 2003 Canada Winter Games, where he won a bronze medal.

Ng, who was a member of the J. D. Lind junior rink, was invited to play for Team Canada (skipped by Charley Thomas) as an alternate at the 2006 World Junior Curling Championships. Ng only played in one game at the event, but took home the gold medal along with the rest of the team. The following season, Ng joined the Thomas rink as their second. The team represented Alberta at the 2007 Canadian Junior Curling Championships, losing just one game en route to the championship. They represented Canada at the 2007 World Junior Curling Championships, where they again lost just one game en route to winning their second gold medal.

In university curling, Ng was a member of the University of Calgary Dinos curling team at the 2008 and 2010 CIS/CCA Curling Championships.

=== Men's ===
Ng reunited with some of his former junior teammates in 2010, playing lead on a team skipped by Brock Virtue, with Lind playing third. In their first season, the team played in a number of events on the World Curling Tour, including the 2011 Players' Championship, Ng's first Grand Slam event of his career. They lost all three of their games there. The next season, the team did not play in any slams, but on the tour they did win the World Financial Group Classic. In 2012, Virtue was replaced with Charley Thomas as the team's skip. The team played another competitive season together. Thomas and Ng played again for one more season before that team broke up in 2014.

After 2014, Ng did not curl much competitively until joining the Northwest Territories-based Jamie Koe rink for the 2018-19 season. The team won the 2019 Northwest Territories Men's Curling Championship and represented the Northwest Territories at the 2019 Tim Hortons Brier, Ng's first men's national championship appearance. At the Brier, the team finished with a 1–6 record, only defeating Nunavut. The following season, the team once again won the 2020 Northwest Territories Men's Curling Championship with a perfect 5–0 record throughout the tournament.

== Personal life ==
Ng is married and has one daughter. He is employed as a geophysicist with Advantage Oil and Gas Ltd.
