= 2012 Victoria Curling Classic Invitational =

World Curling Tour event

- Host city: Victoria, British Columbia
- Arena: Archie Browning Sports Centre
- Dates: March 29 – April 1
- Men's winner: (Alberta) Kevin Martin
- Curling club: Saville Sports Centre, Edmonton
- Skip: Kevin Martin
- Third: John Morris
- Second: Marc Kennedy
- Lead: Ben Hebert
- Finalist: (Manitoba) Mike McEwen
- Women's winner: (Manitoba) Chelsea Carey
- Curling club: Morden Curling Club, Morden
- Skip: Chelsea Carey
- Third: Kristy McDonald
- Second: Kristen Foster
- Lead: Lindsay Titheridge
- Finalist: (Alberta) Shannon Kleibrink

The 2012 Victoria Curling Classic Invitational was held at the Archie Browning Sports Centre in Victoria, British Columbia from March 29 to April 1 as part of the 2011–12 World Curling Tour. The purse for the men's and women's events was CAD$72,000 and CAD$18,000, respectively.

== Men ==
=== Teams ===
Skip	Third	Second	Lead	Locale
Jim Cotter	Kevin Folk	Tyrel Griffith	Rick Sawatsky	Vernon, British Columbia
Neil Dangerfield	Dennis Sutton	Darren Boden	Glen Allen	Victoria, British Columbia
John Epping	Scott Bailey	Scott Howard	David Mathers	Toronto, Ontario
Rob Fowler	Kevin Park	Richard Daneault	Derek Samagalski	Brandon, Manitoba
Wayne Harris	Stuart Larson	Fred Pugh	Don Nickarson	Comox Valley, British Columbia
Rob Iuvale	Dave Blower	Ryan Scott	Rich Thierbach	Victoria, British Columbia
Dean Joanisse	Mike Wood	David Nantes	Cory Chester	Victoria, British Columbia
Kevin Koe	Pat Simmons	Carter Rycroft	Nolan Thiessen	Edmonton, Alberta
Kevin Martin	John Morris	Marc Kennedy	Ben Hebert	Edmonton, Alberta
Mike McEwen	B.J. Neufeld	Matt Wozniak	Denni Neufeld	Winnipeg, Manitoba
Rick McKague	Jim Moats	Doug McNish	Paul Strandlund	Edmonton, Alberta
Jason Montgomery	Miles Craig	William Duggan		Duncan, British Columbia
Dan Petryk (fourth)	Steve Petryk (skip)	Colin Hodgson	Brad Chyz	Calgary, Alberta
Jeff Stoughton	Jon Mead	Reid Carruthers	Tyler Forrest	Winnipeg, Manitoba
Naomasa Takeda	Akira Takeda	Naoki Kon	Hiroshi Fukui	Aomori, Japan
Brock Virtue	Braeden Moskowy	Chris Schille	D.J. Kidby	Regina, Saskatchewan

=== Results ===
==== A Event ====
First Knockout		Semifinals		Qualifier 1
(Manitoba) Mike McEwen	5
(British Columbia) Rob Iuvale	2	(Manitoba) Mike McEwen	6
(Saskatchewan) Brock Virtue	4	(Alberta) Steve Petryk	7
(Alberta) Steve Petryk	5			(Alberta) Steve Petryk	4
(Ontario) John Epping	5			(Ontario) John Epping	7
(British Columbia) Jason Montgomery	2	(Ontario) John Epping	6
(Alberta) Kevin Koe	6	(Alberta) Kevin Koe	4
(Alberta) Rick McKague	3

First Knockout		Semifinals		Qualifier 2
(Alberta) Kevin Martin	9
(British Columbia) Wayne Harris	3	(Alberta) Kevin Martin	5
(British Columbia) Jim Cotter	6	(British Columbia) Jim Cotter	6
(British Columbia) Dean Joanisse	3			(British Columbia) Jim Cotter	4
(Manitoba) Rob Fowler	10			(Manitoba) Jeff Stoughton	2
(British Columbia) Neil Dangerfield	7	(Manitoba) Rob Fowler	0
(Manitoba) Jeff Stoughton	9	(Manitoba) Jeff Stoughton	6
(Japan) Naomasa Takeda	1

==== B Event ====
Second Knockout		Semifinals		Qualifier 3
(British Columbia) Rob Iuvale	4
(Saskatchewan) Brock Virtue	8	(Saskatchewan) Brock Virtue	6
(British Columbia) Jason Montgomery	9	(British Columbia) Jason Montgomery	5
(Alberta) Rick McKague	0			(Saskatchewan) Brock Virtue	1
				(Manitoba) Jeff Stoughton	5

Second Knockout		Semifinals		Qualifier 4
(British Columbia) Wayne Harris	3
(British Columbia) Dean Joanisse	9	(British Columbia) Dean Joanisse	5
(British Columbia) Neil Dangerfield	8	(British Columbia) Neil Dangerfield	4
(Japan) Naomasa Takeda	3			(British Columbia) Dean Joanisse	7
				(Alberta) Steve Petryk	4

Second Knockout		Qualifier 5
(Manitoba) Mike McEwen	3
(Alberta) Kevin Koe	5	(Alberta) Kevin Koe	3
(Alberta) Kevin Martin	4	(Alberta) Kevin Martin	4
(Manitoba) Rob Fowler	1

==== C Event ====
Third Knockout		Semifinals		Qualifier 6
(British Columbia) Rob Iuvale	10
(Alberta) Rick McKague	7	(British Columbia) Rob Iuvale	0
		(Manitoba) Rob Fowler	9
				(Manitoba) Rob Fowler	5
				(Alberta) Steve Petryk	2

Third Knockout		Semifinals		Qualifier 7
(British Columbia) Wayne Harris	5
(Japan) Naomasa Takeda	8	(Japan) Naomasa Takeda	3
		(Manitoba) Mike McEwen	6
				(Manitoba) Mike McEwen	4
				(Saskatchewan) Brock Virtue	3

Third Knockout		Qualifier 8
(British Columbia) Jason Montgomery	8
(British Columbia) Neil Dangerfield	1	(British Columbia) Jason Montgomery	2
		(Alberta) Kevin Koe	5

=== Playoffs ===
Quarterfinals		Semifinals		Final
(Ontario) John Epping	1
(Alberta) Kevin Koe	5	(Alberta) Kevin Koe	2
(British Columbia) Dean Joanisse	4	(Alberta) Kevin Martin	4
(Alberta) Kevin Martin	5			(Alberta) Kevin Martin	5
(Manitoba) Mike McEwen	7			(Manitoba) Mike McEwen	2
(British Columbia) Jim Cotter	2	(Manitoba) Mike McEwen	6
(Manitoba) Rob Fowler	4	(Manitoba) Rob Fowler	5
(Manitoba) Jeff Stoughton	3

== Women ==
=== Teams ===
Skip	Third	Second	Lead	Locale
Cheryl Bernard	Susan O'Connor	Lori Olson-Johns	Jennifer Sadleir	Calgary, Alberta
Chelsea Carey	Kristy McDonald	Kristen Foster	Lindsay Titheridge	Morden, Manitoba
Sarah Wark (fourth)	Michelle Allen	Simone Brousseau	Roselyn Craig (skip)	Victoria, British Columbia
Kaitlyn Lawes	Jill Officer	Dawn Askin	Jennifer Clark-Rouire	Winnipeg, Manitoba
Shannon Kleibrink	Carolyn McRorie	Kalynn Park	Cary-Anne Sallows	Calgary, Alberta
Cathy Overton-Clapham	Rachel Homan	Ashley Howard	Breanne Meakin	Winnipeg, Manitoba
Marilou Richter	Darah Provencal	Jessie Sanderson	Sandra Comadina	Vancouver, British Columbia
Kelly Scott	Dailene Sivertson	Sasha Carter	Jacquie Armstrong	Kelowna, British Columbia

=== Round-robin standings ===
Pool A	W	L
(Manitoba) Kaitlyn Lawes	3	0
(British Columbia) Roselyn Craig	2	1
(Alberta) Cheryl Bernard	1	2
(Manitoba) Cathy Overton-Clapham	0	3

Pool B	W	L
(Manitoba) Chelsea Carey	2	1
(Alberta) Shannon Kleibrink	2	1
(British Columbia) Marilou Richter	1	2
(British Columbia) Kelly Scott	1	2

=== Round-robin results ===
Berth	Bernard	Lawes	Craig	Overton-Clapham
(Alberta) Bernard		4–6	4–5	5–4
(Manitoba) Lawes	6–4		8–3	10–3
(British Columbia) Craig	5–4	3–8		5–4
(Manitoba) Overton-Clapham	4–5	3–10	4–5	

Berth	Carey	Kleibrink	Richter	Scott
(Manitoba) Carey		0–8	6–0	7–3
(Alberta) Kleibrink	8–0		7–5	7–8
(British Columbia) Richter	0–6	5–7		4–3
(British Columbia) Scott	3–7	8–7	3–4	

=== Playoffs ===
Semifinals
1	(Manitoba) Chelsea Carey	8
4	(Manitoba) Kaitlyn Lawes	5
3	(Alberta) Shannon Kleibrink	8
2	(British Columbia) Roselyn Craig	3

Final
(Manitoba) Chelsea Carey	5
(Alberta) Shannon Kleibrink	3
