= 2007 Canadian Junior Curling Championships =

The 2007 M&M Meat Shops Canadian Junior Curling Championships was held February 3–11 at the Jack Gatecliff Arena and the St. Catharines Golf and Country Club in St. Catharines, Ontario. The winning teams represented Canada at the 2007 World Junior Curling Championships.

== Men's ==
=== Teams ===
Province / Territory	Skip	Third	Second	Lead
Alberta	Charley Thomas	Brock Virtue	Matt Ng	Kyle Reynolds
British Columbia	Bryan Kedziora	Derek Errington	Mike Goerz	Tyler MacKenzie
Manitoba	Andrew Irving	B.J. Neufeld	Travis Taylor	Marc Lacroix
New Brunswick	Stephen Burgess	Chris Jeffrey	Ronnie Burgess	Kevin Brayshaw
Newfoundland and Labrador	Ryan Withycombe	Stephen Ryan	Mark Flynn	Scott Eaton
Northern Ontario	Ryan Harnden	Clint Cudmore	Johnny Miners	Steve Molodowich
Northwest Territories	Colin Miller	Rob Heimbach	John Murray	David Aho
Nova Scotia	Dominic Daemen	Ian Juurlink	Robby McLean	Trent Hilliard
Ontario	Ryan Myler	Mick Lizmore	Brodie Tarvit	Jim Clayton
Prince Edward Island	Brett Gallant	Adam Casey	Anson Carmody	Alex MacFadyen
Quebec	Ghyslain Richard	William Dion	Daniel Camber	Miguel Bernard
Saskatchewan	Craig Ochitwa	Jason Tocher	Dustin Anderson	Chris Rediger
Yukon	Thomas Scoffin	Will Mahoney	Nick Koltun	Mitch Young

=== Standings ===
Locale	Skip	W	L
Alberta	Charley Thomas	11	1
Quebec	Ghyslain Richard	9	3
Prince Edward Island	Brett Gallant	9	3
Ontario	Ryan Myler	8	4
Manitoba	Andrew Irving	7	5
Northern Ontario	Ryan Harnden	7	5
Saskatchewan	Craig Ochitwa	6	6
Nova Scotia	Dominic Daemen	6	6
British Columbia	Bryan Kedziora	5	7
New Brunswick	Stephen Burgess	4	8
Newfoundland and Labrador	Ryan Withycombe	3	9
Northwest Territories	Colin Miller	2	10
Yukon	Thomas Scoffin	1	11

=== Results ===
==== Draw 1 ====
Sheet A	1	2	3	4	5	6	7	8	9	10	Final
Alberta (Thomas) 🔨	2	0	2	5	1	0	0	0	X	X	10
New Brunswick (Burgess)	0	1	0	0	0	1	1	1	X	X	4

Sheet E	1	2	3	4	5	6	7	8	9	10	Final
Newfoundland and Labrador (Withycombe) 🔨	2	0	0	1	0	1	0	2	0	X	6
Prince Edward Island (Gallant)	0	3	0	0	3	0	3	0	1	X	10

Sheet G	1	2	3	4	5	6	7	8	9	10	Final
Ontario (Myler) 🔨	0	2	3	0	1	0	0	0	0	3	9
Saskatchewan (Ochitwa)	1	0	0	1	0	3	1	1	1	0	8

Sheet I	1	2	3	4	5	6	7	8	9	10	Final
Nova Scotia (Daemen) 🔨	1	0	3	2	3	0	2	X	X	X	11
British Columbia (Kedziora)	0	1	0	0	0	1	0	X	X	X	2

==== Draw 2 ====
Sheet A	1	2	3	4	5	6	7	8	9	10	Final
Yukon (Scoffin) 🔨	1	0	0	0	0	0	0	0	0	X	1
Quebec (Richard)	0	2	1	0	2	1	2	4	1	X	13

Sheet C	1	2	3	4	5	6	7	8	9	10	Final
Manitoba (Irving) 🔨	1	0	1	0	0	0	1	0	1	X	4
Alberta (Thomas)	0	1	0	3	2	0	0	1	0	X	7

Sheet E	1	2	3	4	5	6	7	8	9	10	Final
Northern Ontario (Harnden) 🔨	3	1	0	3	0	0	4	0	X	X	11
Nova Scotia (Daemen)	0	0	1	0	1	1	0	1	X	X	4

Sheet I	1	2	3	4	5	6	7	8	9	10	Final
Northwest Territories (Miller) 🔨	0	0	1	0	1	0	0	0	2	X	4
Ontario (Myler)	0	2	0	2	0	4	0	1	0	X	9

==== Draw 3 ====
Sheet B	1	2	3	4	5	6	7	8	9	10	Final
British Columbia (Kedziora) 🔨	3	0	0	1	0	3	4	X	X	X	11
Newfoundland and Labrador (Withycombe)	0	0	0	0	3	0	0	X	X	X	3

Sheet D	1	2	3	4	5	6	7	8	9	10	Final
New Brunswick (Burgess) 🔨	2	0	1	0	4	1	2	X	X	X	10
Northwest Territories (Miller)	0	0	0	1	0	0	0	X	X	X	1

Sheet F	1	2	3	4	5	6	7	8	9	10	Final
Quebec (Richard) 🔨	0	2	0	0	0	0	0	2	2	X	6
Manitoba (Irving)	0	0	1	0	0	1	1	0	0	X	3

Sheet H	1	2	3	4	5	6	7	8	9	10	Final
Prince Edward Island (Gallant) 🔨	0	5	0	4	3	1	X	X	X	X	13
Yukon (Scoffin)	1	0	1	0	0	0	X	X	X	X	2

Sheet J	1	2	3	4	5	6	7	8	9	10	Final
Saskatchewan (Ochitwa) 🔨	2	0	1	0	0	0	1	0	0	X	4
Northern Ontario (Harnden)	0	1	0	3	1	1	0	1	1	X	8

==== Draw 4 ====
Sheet A	1	2	3	4	5	6	7	8	9	10	Final
Nova Scotia (Daemen) 🔨	0	1	1	2	0	0	0	1	0	1	6
Newfoundland and Labrador (Withycombe)	0	0	0	0	1	1	1	0	2	0	5

Sheet C	1	2	3	4	5	6	7	8	9	10	Final
Prince Edward Island (Gallant) 🔨	0	0	3	0	1	0	1	1	0	0	6
Quebec (Richard)	1	2	0	0	0	1	0	0	2	1	7

Sheet E	1	2	3	4	5	6	7	8	9	10	Final
New Brunswick (Burgess) 🔨	0	2	0	0	2	0	0	2	0	X	6
Ontario (Myler)	0	0	2	0	0	1	1	0	4	X	8

Sheet H	1	2	3	4	5	6	7	8	9	10	Final
Northwest Territories (Miller) 🔨	0	0	0	0	0	1	0	2	0	X	3
Saskatchewan (Ochitwa)	1	1	1	2	1	0	2	0	3	X	11

Sheet J	1	2	3	4	5	6	7	8	9	10	Final
Yukon (Scoffin) 🔨	2	0	0	0	0	2	1	0	0	0	5
Manitoba (Irving)	0	1	3	0	1	0	0	0	0	1	6

==== Draw 5 ====
Sheet D	1	2	3	4	5	6	7	8	9	10	Final
Northern Ontario (Harnden) 🔨	2	0	1	2	0	1	1	0	0	3	10
British Columbia (Kedziora)	0	1	0	0	2	0	0	3	2	0	8

Sheet G	1	2	3	4	5	6	7	8	9	10	Final
Saskatchewan (Ochitwa) 🔨	0	2	0	1	1	0	4	1	X	X	9
Nova Scotia (Daemen)	0	0	1	0	0	2	0	0	X	X	3

Sheet I	1	2	3	4	5	6	7	8	9	10	Final
Quebec (Richard) 🔨	1	1	0	1	0	0	0	1	1	0	5
Alberta (Thomas)	0	0	3	0	3	0	1	0	0	1	8

==== Draw 6 ====
Sheet B	1	2	3	4	5	6	7	8	9	10	Final
Alberta (Thomas) 🔨	0	3	3	1	0	2	0	2	0	X	11
Northwest Territories (Miller)	0	0	0	0	1	0	1	0	0	X	2

Sheet C	1	2	3	4	5	6	7	8	9	10	Final
Newfoundland and Labrador (Withycombe) 🔨	0	0	1	0	2	0	0	0	X	X	3
Yukon (Scoffin)	0	1	0	2	0	2	1	4	X	X	10

Sheet F	1	2	3	4	5	6	7	8	9	10	Final
British Columbia (Kedziora) 🔨	0	0	0	0	0	1	0	1	0	X	2
Prince Edward Island (Gallant)	0	0	0	0	2	0	2	0	1	X	5

Sheet H	1	2	3	4	5	6	7	8	9	10	Final
Manitoba (Irving) 🔨	1	0	1	0	4	0	1	0	3	X	10
New Brunswick (Burgess)	0	1	0	1	0	2	0	1	0	X	5

Sheet I	1	2	3	4	5	6	7	8	9	10	Final
Ontario (Myler) 🔨	2	3	0	2	0	1	X	X	X	X	8
Northern Ontario (Harnden)	0	0	1	0	1	0	X	X	X	X	2

==== Draw 7 ====
Sheet B	1	2	3	4	5	6	7	8	9	10	Final
Ontario (Myler) 🔨	0	2	1	0	0	0	3	0	0	X	6
Nova Scotia (Daemen)	1	0	0	0	1	1	0	1	0	X	4

Sheet D	1	2	3	4	5	6	7	8	9	10	Final
Yukon (Scoffin) 🔨	0	1	0	0	1	1	1	0	1	0	5
Alberta (Thomas)	1	0	3	0	0	0	0	1	0	1	6

Sheet E	1	2	3	4	5	6	7	8	9	10	Final
Manitoba (Irving) 🔨	0	1	0	2	0	1	0	2	0	X	6
Northwest Territories (Miller)	0	0	1	0	1	0	1	0	2	X	5

Sheet G	1	2	3	4	5	6	7	8	9	10	Final
Northern Ontario (Harnden) 🔨	1	0	6	3	0	0	X	X	X	X	10
Newfoundland and Labrador (Withycombe)	0	1	0	0	1	0	X	X	X	X	2

==== Draw 8 ====
Sheet C	1	2	3	4	5	6	7	8	9	10	Final
New Brunswick (Burgess) 🔨	0	1	0	0	1	1	0	4	X	X	7
Saskatchewan (Ochitwa)	0	0	0	2	0	0	1	0	X	X	3

Sheet E	1	2	3	4	5	6	7	8	9	10	Final
British Columbia (Kedziora) 🔨	0	3	1	0	0	2	0	4	X	X	10
Yukon (Scoffin)	1	0	0	1	2	0	1	0	X	X	5

Sheet H	1	2	3	4	5	6	7	8	9	10	Final
Nova Scotia (Daemen) 🔨	1	0	0	2	0	0	0	X	X	X	3
Prince Edward Island (Gallant)	0	0	1	0	3	1	4	X	X	X	9

Sheet J	1	2	3	4	5	6	7	8	9	10	Final
Newfoundland and Labrador (Withycombe) 🔨	0	1	1	0	0	0	0	0	X	X	2
Quebec (Richard)	0	0	0	1	2	3	1	1	X	X	8

==== Draw 9 ====
Sheet A	1	2	3	4	5	6	7	8	9	10	Final
Prince Edward Island (Gallant) 🔨	2	0	1	0	1	1	0	4	X	X	9
Manitoba (Irving)	0	2	0	1	0	0	1	0	X	X	4

Sheet C	1	2	3	4	5	6	7	8	9	10	Final
Northwest Territories (Miller) 🔨	1	0	0	0	1	0	X	X	X	X	2
Northern Ontario (Harnden)	0	3	2	2	0	4	X	X	X	X	11

Sheet F	1	2	3	4	5	6	7	8	9	10	Final
Alberta (Thomas) 🔨	2	1	0	1	0	2	4	X	X	X	10
Ontario (Myler)	0	0	1	0	3	0	0	X	X	X	4

Sheet G	1	2	3	4	5	6	7	8	9	10	Final
Quebec (Richard) 🔨	0	2	2	0	0	3	0	0	3	X	10
New Brunswick (Burgess)	0	0	0	3	2	0	0	1	0	X	6

Sheet I	1	2	3	4	5	6	7	8	9	10	11	Final
Saskatchewan (Ochitwa) 🔨	1	0	1	0	1	2	0	0	0	1	0	6
British Columbia (Kedziora)	0	0	0	2	0	0	2	1	1	0	3	9

==== Draw 10 ====
Sheet A	1	2	3	4	5	6	7	8	9	10	Final
Alberta (Thomas) 🔨	2	0	0	0	2	3	3	0	X	X	10
Saskatchewan (Ochitwa)	0	0	2	1	0	0	0	0	X	X	3

Sheet D	1	2	3	4	5	6	7	8	9	10	Final
Newfoundland and Labrador (Withycombe) 🔨	0	1	0	1	0	0	0	X	X	X	2
Manitoba (Irving)	0	0	2	0	3	3	1	X	X	X	9

Sheet H	1	2	3	4	5	6	7	8	9	10	Final
British Columbia (Kedziora) 🔨	0	0	1	1	0	0	0	X	X	X	2
Quebec (Richard)	1	2	0	0	2	1	1	X	X	X	7

==== Draw 11 ====
Sheet A	1	2	3	4	5	6	7	8	9	10	Final
Quebec (Richard) 🔨	2	0	0	2	0	5	0	0	3	X	12
Northwest Territories (Miller)	0	1	1	0	1	0	0	1	0	X	4

Sheet D	1	2	3	4	5	6	7	8	9	10	Final
New Brunswick (Burgess) 🔨	0	0	2	0	0	2	2	1	X	X	7
Northern Ontario (Harnden)	0	1	0	0	1	0	0	0	X	X	2

Sheet F	1	2	3	4	5	6	7	8	9	10	Final
Nova Scotia (Daemen) 🔨	2	0	2	1	2	0	0	2	X	X	9
Yukon (Scoffin)	0	0	0	0	0	1	1	0	X	X	2

Sheet G	1	2	3	4	5	6	7	8	9	10	Final
Prince Edward Island (Gallant) 🔨	0	0	0	2	0	0	3	0	1	X	6
Alberta (Thomas)	1	0	1	0	0	1	0	1	0	X	4

Sheet J	1	2	3	4	5	6	7	8	9	10	Final
Manitoba (Irving) 🔨	3	1	0	0	1	0	0	1	0	0	6
Ontario (Myler)	0	0	1	0	0	1	0	0	1	2	5

==== Draw 12 ====
Sheet B	1	2	3	4	5	6	7	8	9	10	Final
Northern Ontario (Harnden) 🔨	0	0	0	1	1	0	0	0	X	X	2
Prince Edward Island (Gallant)	0	0	1	0	0	5	1	4	X	X	11

Sheet D	1	2	3	4	5	6	7	8	9	10	Final
Northwest Territories (Miller) 🔨	1	0	0	0	0	0	0	0	1	X	2
Nova Scotia (Daemen)	0	0	0	2	0	2	0	1	0	X	5

Sheet E	1	2	3	4	5	6	7	8	9	10	Final
Ontario (Myler) 🔨	1	0	0	0	1	0	2	1	1	1	7
British Columbia (Kedziora)	0	0	2	2	0	2	0	0	0	0	6

Sheet H	1	2	3	4	5	6	7	8	9	10	11	Final
Saskatchewan (Ochitwa) 🔨	2	0	1	0	0	2	0	2	0	1	1	9
Newfoundland and Labrador (Withycombe)	0	2	0	2	1	0	2	0	1	0	0	8

Sheet I	1	2	3	4	5	6	7	8	9	10	Final
Yukon (Scoffin) 🔨	2	0	0	1	0	0	0	1	0	X	4
New Brunswick (Burgess)	0	3	2	0	2	1	1	0	4	X	13

==== Draw 13 ====
Sheet B	1	2	3	4	5	6	7	8	9	10	Final
Nova Scotia (Daemen) 🔨	2	0	2	0	1	0	3	2	X	X	10
Quebec (Richard)	0	2	0	2	0	1	0	0	X	X	5

Sheet C	1	2	3	4	5	6	7	8	9	10	11	Final
British Columbia (Kedziora) 🔨	1	0	0	0	1	0	0	1	1	1	1	6
Manitoba (Irving)	0	1	2	1	0	0	1	0	0	0	0	5

Sheet H	1	2	3	4	5	6	7	8	9	10	Final
Prince Edward Island (Gallant) 🔨	0	0	1	0	2	0	0	0	1	1	5
New Brunswick (Burgess)	0	0	0	2	0	0	0	1	0	0	3

Sheet J	1	2	3	4	5	6	7	8	9	10	Final
Northern Ontario (Harnden) 🔨	3	0	0	2	2	0	2	2	X	X	11
Yukon (Scoffin)	0	1	2	0	0	1	0	0	X	X	4

==== Draw 14 ====
Sheet A	1	2	3	4	5	6	7	8	9	10	Final
Ontario (Myler) 🔨	0	1	0	0	1	0	0	0	0	0	2
Newfoundland and Labrador (Withycombe)	0	0	1	0	0	1	1	0	1	2	6

Sheet E	1	2	3	4	5	6	7	8	9	10	11	Final
Alberta (Thomas) 🔨	1	0	0	2	0	3	0	0	1	0	2	9
Northern Ontario (Harnden)	0	2	1	0	1	0	0	2	0	1	0	7

Sheet G	1	2	3	4	5	6	7	8	9	10	Final
Northwest Territories (Miller) 🔨	0	0	1	0	0	4	0	0	2	2	9
British Columbia (Kedziora)	0	3	0	0	3	0	0	1	0	0	7

Sheet J	1	2	3	4	5	6	7	8	9	10	Final
Saskatchewan (Ochitwa) 🔨	2	0	2	1	1	1	X	X	X	X	7
Prince Edward Island (Gallant)	0	1	0	0	0	0	X	X	X	X	1

==== Draw 15 ====
Sheet B	1	2	3	4	5	6	7	8	9	10	11	Final
Yukon (Scoffin) 🔨	0	2	0	0	0	0	1	2	0	0	0	5
Northwest Territories (Miller)	1	0	2	0	0	0	0	0	1	1	1	6

Sheet D	1	2	3	4	5	6	7	8	9	10	Final
Quebec (Richard) 🔨	1	1	0	0	2	0	3	0	0	X	7
Ontario (Myler)	0	0	1	0	0	1	0	2	0	X	4

Sheet F	1	2	3	4	5	6	7	8	9	10	Final
Manitoba (Irving) 🔨	2	0	0	0	1	0	0	0	X	X	3
Saskatchewan (Ochitwa)	0	1	1	1	0	1	2	1	X	X	7

Sheet G	1	2	3	4	5	6	7	8	9	10	Final
Newfoundland and Labrador (Withyombe) 🔨	1	0	1	0	3	0	1	0	0	X	6
Alberta (Thomas)	0	2	0	2	0	1	0	3	1	X	9

Sheet J	1	2	3	4	5	6	7	8	9	10	Final
New Brunswick (Burgess) 🔨	2	0	1	0	0	1	1	0	2	X	7
Nova Scotia (Daemen)	0	3	0	0	3	0	0	3	0	X	9

==== Draw 16 ====
Sheet D	1	2	3	4	5	6	7	8	9	10	Final
Saskatchewan (Ochitwa) 🔨	1	2	0	3	0	0	2	5	X	X	13
Yukon (Scoffin)	0	0	1	0	2	1	0	0	X	X	4

Sheet F	1	2	3	4	5	6	7	8	9	10	Final
Prince Edward Island (Gallant) 🔨	2	0	1	1	0	3	0	1	0	X	8
Northwest Territories (Miller)	0	1	0	0	2	0	0	0	1	X	4

Sheet H	1	2	3	4	5	6	7	8	9	10	Final
Northern Ontario (Harnden) 🔨	0	1	1	0	1	0	1	0	0	1	5
Quebec (Richard)	1	0	0	1	0	1	0	1	0	0	4

Sheet J	1	2	3	4	5	6	7	8	9	10	Final
British Columbia (Kedziora) 🔨	1	1	0	0	1	0	0	0	0	1	4
Alberta (Thomas)	0	0	0	1	0	2	0	1	1	0	5

==== Draw 17 ====
Sheet A	1	2	3	4	5	6	7	8	9	10	Final
Manitoba (Irving) 🔨	2	1	1	1	0	1	0	0	0	1	7
Northern Ontario (Harnden)	0	0	0	0	1	0	1	1	1	0	4

Sheet C	1	2	3	4	5	6	7	8	9	10	Final
Alberta (Thomas) 🔨	0	0	0	3	0	3	0	1	0	2	9
Nova Scotia (Daemen)	0	1	0	0	2	0	2	0	1	0	6

Sheet F	1	2	3	4	5	6	7	8	9	10	Final
Newfoundland and Labrador (Withycombe) 🔨	0	3	0	1	0	0	0	2	0	X	6
New Brunswick (Burgess)	0	0	1	0	1	0	1	0	1	X	4

Sheet G	1	2	3	4	5	6	7	8	9	10	Final
Yukon (Scoffin) 🔨	0	0	0	1	0	0	0	0	0	X	1
Ontario (Myler)	0	2	0	0	0	1	2	2	1	X	8

==== Draw 18 ====
Sheet A	1	2	3	4	5	6	7	8	9	10	Final
New Brunswick (Burgess) 🔨	0	0	0	1	1	0	2	0	X	X	4
British Columbia (Kedziora)	2	1	1	0	0	3	0	2	X	X	9

Sheet C	1	2	3	4	5	6	7	8	9	10	Final
Ontario (Myler) 🔨	0	1	0	2	1	0	0	1	0	3	8
Prince Edward Island (Gallant)	2	0	2	0	0	1	0	0	2	0	7

Sheet E	1	2	3	4	5	6	7	8	9	10	11	Final
Quebec (Richard) 🔨	2	0	2	1	1	0	1	0	0	1	3	11
Saskatchewan (Ochitwa)	0	3	0	0	0	1	0	3	1	0	0	8

Sheet G	1	2	3	4	5	6	7	8	9	10	Final
Nova Scotia (Daemen) 🔨	1	0	0	2	1	0	0	0	1	X	5
Manitoba (Irving)	0	1	1	0	0	2	1	1	0	X	6

Sheet I	1	2	3	4	5	6	7	8	9	10	Final
Northwest Territories (Miller) 🔨	0	0	0	0	2	1	0	1	0	0	4
Newfoundland and Labrador (Withycombe)	0	1	1	0	0	0	2	0	1	1	6

=== Playoffs ===
Semifinal		Final
Prince Edward Island	7
Quebec	6	Alberta	7
		Prince Edward Island	6

==== Semifinal ====
Sheet H	1	2	3	4	5	6	7	8	9	10	11	Final
Prince Edward Island (Gallant) 🔨	0	0	2	0	1	0	1	0	2	0	1	7
Quebec (Richard)	0	0	0	1	0	1	0	2	0	2	0	6

Player percentages
Prince Edward Island		Quebec	
Alex MacFadyen	68%	Miguel Bernard	77%
Anson Carmody	63%	Daniel Camber	70%
Adam Casey	80%	William Dion	65%
Brett Gallant	77%	Ghyslain Richard	70%
Total	72%	Total	71%

==== Final ====
Sheet B	1	2	3	4	5	6	7	8	9	10	11	Final
Alberta (Thomas) 🔨	0	1	0	1	0	1	2	0	1	0	1	7
Prince Edward Island (Gallant)	0	0	2	0	2	0	0	1	0	1	0	6

Player percentages
Alberta		Prince Edward Island	
Kyle Reynolds	78%	Alex MacFadyen	77%
Matt Ng	66%	Anson Carmody	80%
Brock Virtue	68%	Adam Casey	75%
Charley Thomas	73%	Brett Gallant	60%
Total	71%	Total	73%

== Women's ==
=== Teams ===
Province / Territory	Skip	Third	Second	Lead
Alberta	Kalynn Park	Cary-Anne Sallows	Jessica Kaufman	Joanne Taylor
British Columbia	Dailene Sivertson	Steph Jackson	Kristen Mitchell	Megan Reid
Manitoba	Calleen Neufeld	Sabrina Neufeld	Laryssa Grenkow	Breanne Meakin
New Brunswick	Mary Jane McGuire	Megan McGuire	Erika Nabuurs	Brigitte MacPhail
Newfoundland and Labrador	Stacie Devereaux	Stephanie Guzzwell	Sarah Paul	Julie Devereaux
Northern Ontario	Tracy Horgan	Amanda Gates	Tara Stephen	Stephanie Barbeau
Northwest Territories	Megan Cormier	Kourtney Williams	Jessica Johnson	Valisa Aho
Nova Scotia	Marie Christianson	Katie Thomas	Liz Woodworth	Jenn Baxter
Ontario	Hollie Nicol	Laura Hickey	Karen Sagle	Hilary McDermott
Prince Edward Island	Erin Carmody	Geri-Lynn Ramsay	Lisa Moerike	Jessica vanOuwerkerk
Quebec	Alanna Routledge	Kristen Richard	Brittany O'Rourke	Sasha Beauchamp
Saskatchewan	Hailey Surik	Val Sweeting	Cris Goertzen	Brityany Lemon
Yukon	Chelsea Duncan	Sarah Koltun (skip)	Linea Eby	Tessa Vibe

=== Standings ===
Locale	Skip	W	L
Newfoundland and Labrador	Stacie Devereaux	11	1
British Columbia	Dailene Sivertson	8	4
Saskatchewan	Hailey Surik	8	4
Manitoba	Calleen Neufeld	8	4
Alberta	Kalynn Park	7	5
Ontario	Hollie Nicol	7	5
Northern Ontario	Tracy Horgan	7	5
Prince Edward Island	Erin Carmody	7	5
New Brunswick	Mary Jane McGuire	6	6
Nova Scotia	Marie Christianson	6	6
Quebec	Alanna Routledge	2	10
Yukon	Sarah Koltun	1	11
Northwest Territories	Megan Cormier	0	12

=== Results ===
==== Draw 1 ====
Sheet B	1	2	3	4	5	6	7	8	9	10	Final
Alberta (Park) 🔨	1	1	1	0	3	0	0	2	X	X	8
New Brunswick (McGuire)	0	0	0	1	0	2	0	0	X	X	3

Sheet F	1	2	3	4	5	6	7	8	9	10	Final
Newfoundland and Labrador (Devereaux) 🔨	1	0	0	1	0	0	1	X	X	X	3
Prince Edward Island (Carmody)	0	3	4	0	1	1	0	X	X	X	9

Sheet H	1	2	3	4	5	6	7	8	9	10	Final
Ontario (Nicol) 🔨	1	0	1	0	1	1	0	2	2	X	8
Saskatchewan (Surik)	0	0	0	3	0	0	2	0	0	X	5

Sheet J	1	2	3	4	5	6	7	8	9	10	Final
Nova Scotia (Christianson) 🔨	0	1	0	0	0	2	0	X	X	X	3
British Columbia (Sivertson)	1	0	2	1	1	0	5	X	X	X	10

==== Draw 2 ====
Sheet B	1	2	3	4	5	6	7	8	9	10	Final
Yukon (Koltun) 🔨	1	0	0	2	1	0	0	2	0	0	6
Quebec (Routledge)	0	0	1	0	0	2	3	0	0	1	7

Sheet D	1	2	3	4	5	6	7	8	9	10	Final
Manitoba (Neufeld) 🔨	1	3	0	1	0	0	1	1	0	X	7
Alberta (Park)	0	0	3	0	0	0	0	0	1	X	4

Sheet F	1	2	3	4	5	6	7	8	9	10	Final
Northern Ontario (Horgan) 🔨	1	0	0	1	0	1	0	2	1	X	6
Nova Scotia (Christianson)	0	0	1	0	1	0	1	0	0	X	3

Sheet J	1	2	3	4	5	6	7	8	9	10	Final
Northwest Territories (Cormier) 🔨	1	0	0	0	1	0	0	0	3	X	5
Ontario (Nicol)	0	2	1	0	0	2	3	1	0	X	9

==== Draw 3 ====
Sheet A	1	2	3	4	5	6	7	8	9	10	Final
British Columbia (Sivertson) 🔨	2	0	1	0	0	1	0	0	X	X	4
Newfoundland and Labrador (Devereaux)	0	2	0	2	1	0	3	3	X	X	11

Sheet C	1	2	3	4	5	6	7	8	9	10	Final
New Brunswick (McGuire) 🔨	0	0	1	1	0	2	0	0	1	3	8
Northwest Territories (Cormier)	1	1	0	0	2	0	0	1	0	0	5

Sheet E	1	2	3	4	5	6	7	8	9	10	Final
Quebec (Routledge) 🔨	1	0	1	0	0	0	1	0	1	1	5
Manitoba (Neufeld)	0	1	0	3	1	1	0	1	0	0	7

Sheet G	1	2	3	4	5	6	7	8	9	10	Final
Prince Edward Island (Carmody) 🔨	0	1	0	5	3	1	0	X	X	X	10
Yukon (Koltun)	1	0	1	0	0	0	1	X	X	X	3

Sheet I	1	2	3	4	5	6	7	8	9	10	Final
Saskatchewan (Surik) 🔨	0	1	0	2	0	3	0	2	0	0	8
Northern Ontario (Horgan)	2	0	1	0	1	0	2	0	3	1	10

==== Draw 4 ====
Sheet B	1	2	3	4	5	6	7	8	9	10	Final
Nova Scotia (Christianson) 🔨	0	2	0	0	0	1	2	0	1	0	6
Newfoundland and Labrador (Devereaux)	0	0	2	1	0	0	0	2	0	2	7

Sheet D	1	2	3	4	5	6	7	8	9	10	Final
Prince Edward Island (Carmody) 🔨	1	0	3	0	2	2	0	2	X	X	10
Quebec (Routledge)	0	1	0	0	0	0	1	0	X	X	2

Sheet F	1	2	3	4	5	6	7	8	9	10	Final
New Brunswick (McGuire) 🔨	1	0	1	0	1	0	0	0	1	5	9
Ontario (Nicol)	0	1	0	1	0	2	1	1	0	0	6

Sheet G	1	2	3	4	5	6	7	8	9	10	Final
Northwest Territories (Cormier) 🔨	0	0	0	3	0	0	0	1	0	X	4
Saskatchewan (Surik)	0	1	1	0	1	4	2	0	1	X	10

Sheet I	1	2	3	4	5	6	7	8	9	10	Final
Yukon (Koltun) 🔨	0	0	0	0	1	0	0	X	X	X	1
Manitoba (Neufeld)	4	2	3	0	0	1	3	X	X	X	13

==== Draw 5 ====
Sheet C	1	2	3	4	5	6	7	8	9	10	Final
Northern Ontario (Horgan) 🔨	2	0	1	0	0	1	0	0	2	X	6
British Columbia (Sivertson)	0	1	0	1	3	0	3	1	0	X	9

Sheet H	1	2	3	4	5	6	7	8	9	10	Final
Saskatchewan (Surik) 🔨	1	0	2	0	2	0	2	3	X	X	10
Nova Scotia (Christianson)	0	0	0	2	0	1	0	0	X	X	3

Sheet J	1	2	3	4	5	6	7	8	9	10	Final
Quebec (Routledge) 🔨	3	0	0	1	0	0	1	0	3	0	8
Alberta (Park)	0	1	3	0	1	2	0	1	0	1	9

==== Draw 6 ====
Sheet A	1	2	3	4	5	6	7	8	9	10	Final
Alberta (Park) 🔨	1	1	0	2	2	2	0	2	X	X	10
Northwest Territories (Cormier)	0	0	0	0	0	0	1	0	X	X	1

Sheet D	1	2	3	4	5	6	7	8	9	10	Final
Newfoundland and Labrador (Devereaux) 🔨	2	0	1	2	0	3	1	0	X	X	9
Yukon (Koltun)	0	1	0	0	1	0	0	1	X	X	3

Sheet E	1	2	3	4	5	6	7	8	9	10	Final
British Columbia (Sivertson) 🔨	1	0	1	1	0	2	0	0	2	0	7
Prince Edward Island (Carmody)	0	3	0	0	1	0	0	5	0	1	10

Sheet G	1	2	3	4	5	6	7	8	9	10	Final
Manitoba (Neufeld) 🔨	2	0	2	2	0	3	X	X	X	X	9
New Brunswick (McGuire)	0	1	0	0	1	0	X	X	X	X	2

Sheet J	1	2	3	4	5	6	7	8	9	10	11	Final
Ontario (Nicol) 🔨	0	0	2	0	1	0	1	1	0	2	1	8
Northern Ontario (Horgan)	2	0	0	2	0	1	0	0	2	0	0	7

==== Draw 7 ====
Sheet A	1	2	3	4	5	6	7	8	9	10	Final
Ontario (Nicol) 🔨	0	1	0	0	2	0	0	0	0	X	3
Nova Scotia (Christianson)	1	0	1	0	0	1	4	1	1	X	9

Sheet C	1	2	3	4	5	6	7	8	9	10	Final
Yukon (Koltun) 🔨	1	0	0	0	0	2	0	1	0	X	4
Alberta (Park)	0	0	2	2	1	0	1	0	1	X	7

Sheet F	1	2	3	4	5	6	7	8	9	10	Final
Manitoba (Neufeld) 🔨	5	0	3	1	1	0	2	X	X	X	12
Northwest Territories (Cormier)	0	2	0	0	0	2	0	X	X	X	4

Sheet H	1	2	3	4	5	6	7	8	9	10	Final
Northern Ontario (Horgan) 🔨	0	2	0	2	0	0	2	0	2	X	8
Newfoundland and Labrador (Devereaux)	3	0	2	0	1	2	0	1	0	X	9

==== Draw 8 ====
Sheet D	1	2	3	4	5	6	7	8	9	10	Final
New Brunswick (McGuire) 🔨	0	1	1	1	0	0	0	0	0	X	3
Saskatchewan (Surik)	0	0	0	0	2	0	1	1	1	X	5

Sheet F	1	2	3	4	5	6	7	8	9	10	Final
British Columbia (Sivertson) 🔨	1	0	2	2	0	0	2	1	2	X	10
Yukon (Koltun)	0	4	0	0	1	1	0	0	0	X	6

Sheet G	1	2	3	4	5	6	7	8	9	10	Final
Nova Scotia (Christianson) 🔨	1	0	3	0	0	1	0	1	0	1	7
Prince Edward Island (Carmody)	0	1	0	3	0	0	1	0	1	0	6

Sheet I	1	2	3	4	5	6	7	8	9	10	Final
Newfoundland and Labrador (Devereaux) 🔨	0	3	0	0	2	0	2	0	0	X	7
Quebec (Routledge)	0	0	2	1	0	1	0	1	1	X	6

==== Draw 9 ====
Sheet B	1	2	3	4	5	6	7	8	9	10	Final
Prince Edward Island (Carmody) 🔨	0	0	0	1	0	1	2	0	4	X	8
Manitoba (Neufeld)	0	1	0	0	1	0	0	2	0	X	4

Sheet D	1	2	3	4	5	6	7	8	9	10	Final
Northwest Territories (Cormier) 🔨	2	0	1	2	0	2	0	1	0	X	8
Northern Ontario (Horgan)	0	3	0	0	4	0	1	0	3	X	11

Sheet E	1	2	3	4	5	6	7	8	9	10	Final
Alberta (Park) 🔨	2	0	2	1	2	0	X	X	X	X	7
Ontario (Nicol)	0	1	0	0	0	1	X	X	X	X	2

Sheet H	1	2	3	4	5	6	7	8	9	10	Final
Quebec (Routledge) 🔨	0	1	0	0	0	2	X	X	X	X	3
New Brunswick (McGuire)	3	0	2	5	3	0	X	X	X	X	13

Sheet J	1	2	3	4	5	6	7	8	9	10	Final
Saskatchewan (Surik) 🔨	1	0	0	3	1	0	0	0	1	1	7
British Columbia (Sivertson)	0	1	3	0	0	1	1	2	0	0	8

==== Draw 10 ====
Sheet B	1	2	3	4	5	6	7	8	9	10	Final
Alberta (Park) 🔨	0	3	0	0	0	0	1	0	1	X	5
Saskatchewan (Surik)	0	0	2	2	2	1	0	1	0	X	8

Sheet C	1	2	3	4	5	6	7	8	9	10	Final
Newfoundland and Labrador (Devereaux) 🔨	0	2	1	0	0	3	3	X	X	X	9
Manitoba (Neufeld)	0	0	0	2	1	0	0	X	X	X	3

Sheet G	1	2	3	4	5	6	7	8	9	10	Final
British Columbia (Sivertson) 🔨	2	0	0	1	0	1	1	0	3	3	11
Quebec (Routledge)	0	0	2	0	3	0	0	2	0	0	7

==== Draw 11 ====
Sheet B	1	2	3	4	5	6	7	8	9	10	Final
Quebec (Routledge) 🔨	1	1	0	0	3	0	0	4	1	X	10
Northwest Territories (Cormier)	0	0	2	0	0	2	3	0	0	X	7

Sheet C	1	2	3	4	5	6	7	8	9	10	Final
New Brunswick (McGuire) 🔨	0	1	0	1	2	1	0	1	0	X	6
Northern Ontario (Horgan)	1	0	2	0	0	0	1	0	4	X	8

Sheet E	1	2	3	4	5	6	7	8	9	10	Final
Nova Scotia (Christianson) 🔨	3	0	0	4	3	2	X	X	X	X	12
Yukon (Koltun)	0	1	1	0	0	0	X	X	X	X	2

Sheet H	1	2	3	4	5	6	7	8	9	10	Final
Prince Edward Island (Carmody) 🔨	1	0	1	0	1	0	X	X	X	X	3
Alberta (Park)	0	4	0	2	0	3	X	X	X	X	9

Sheet I	1	2	3	4	5	6	7	8	9	10	11	Final
Manitoba (Neufeld) 🔨	2	0	0	0	1	0	1	1	0	0	1	6
Ontario (Nicol)	0	1	0	1	0	1	0	0	1	1	0	5

==== Draw 12 ====
Sheet A	1	2	3	4	5	6	7	8	9	10	Final
Northern Ontario (Horgan) 🔨	0	0	0	1	0	2	0	1	0	1	5
Prince Edward Island (Carmody)	0	1	0	0	1	0	1	0	0	0	3

Sheet C	1	2	3	4	5	6	7	8	9	10	Final
Northwest Territories (Cormier) 🔨	0	1	0	0	0	1	0	0	2	X	4
Nova Scotia (Christianson)	1	0	0	1	0	0	3	3	0	X	8

Sheet F	1	2	3	4	5	6	7	8	9	10	Final
Ontario (Nicol) 🔨	2	0	3	5	1	1	X	X	X	X	12
British Columbia (Sivertson)	0	1	0	0	0	0	X	X	X	X	1

Sheet G	1	2	3	4	5	6	7	8	9	10	Final
Saskatchewan (Surik) 🔨	0	1	0	1	2	0	1	0	1	0	6
Newfoundland and Labrador (Devereaux)	1	0	1	0	0	1	0	1	0	4	8

Sheet J	1	2	3	4	5	6	7	8	9	10	Final
Yukon (Koltun) 🔨	0	0	0	3	1	1	0	0	X	X	5
New Brunswick (McGuire)	1	1	5	0	0	0	3	4	X	X	14

==== Draw 13 ====
Sheet A	1	2	3	4	5	6	7	8	9	10	Final
Nova Scotia (Christianson) 🔨	2	0	0	0	2	0	2	2	0	X	8
Quebec (Routledge)	0	0	1	0	0	2	0	0	1	X	4

Sheet D	1	2	3	4	5	6	7	8	9	10	11	12	Final
British Columbia (Sivertson) 🔨	1	0	0	1	0	1	0	0	2	1	0	2	8
Manitoba (Neufeld)	0	1	1	0	2	0	1	1	0	0	0	0	6

Sheet G	1	2	3	4	5	6	7	8	9	10	Final
Prince Edward Island (Carmody) 🔨	1	0	1	3	0	0	2	0	4	X	11
New Brunswick (McGuire)	0	1	0	0	1	1	0	1	0	X	4

Sheet I	1	2	3	4	5	6	7	8	9	10	Final
Northern Ontario (Horgan) 🔨	2	0	2	0	2	0	1	2	0	1	10
Yukon (Koltun)	0	1	0	2	0	3	0	0	1	0	7

==== Draw 14 ====
Sheet B	1	2	3	4	5	6	7	8	9	10	Final
Ontario (Nicol) 🔨	2	0	0	0	1	0	0	0	2	X	5
Newfoundland and Labrador (Devereaux)	0	2	0	1	0	3	1	1	0	X	8

Sheet F	1	2	3	4	5	6	7	8	9	10	Final
Alberta (Park) 🔨	1	1	1	0	0	1	0	1	0	1	6
Northern Ontario (Horgan)	0	0	0	1	1	0	1	0	1	0	4

Sheet H	1	2	3	4	5	6	7	8	9	10	Final
Northwest Territories (Cormier) 🔨	1	0	1	1	0	0	0	0	0	X	3
British Columbia (Sivertson)	0	1	0	0	2	1	1	3	5	X	13

Sheet I	1	2	3	4	5	6	7	8	9	10	Final
Saskatchewan (Surik) 🔨	2	0	2	0	2	1	0	2	1	X	10
Prince Edward Island (Carmody)	0	1	0	3	0	0	1	0	0	X	5

==== Draw 15 ====
Sheet A	1	2	3	4	5	6	7	8	9	10	Final
Yukon (Koltun) 🔨	0	2	0	1	0	5	0	2	1	X	11
Northwest Territories (Cormier)	1	0	3	0	1	0	2	0	0	X	7

Sheet C	1	2	3	4	5	6	7	8	9	10	11	Final
Quebec (Routledge) 🔨	0	0	0	2	0	0	0	0	1	1	0	4
Ontario (Nicol)	0	1	0	0	0	1	1	1	0	0	2	6

Sheet E	1	2	3	4	5	6	7	8	9	10	Final
Manitoba (Neufeld) 🔨	1	1	4	1	0	0	0	0	1	0	8
Saskatchewan (Surik)	0	0	0	0	2	2	1	2	0	2	9

Sheet H	1	2	3	4	5	6	7	8	9	10	Final
Newfoundland and Labrador (Devereaux) 🔨	0	1	0	0	0	3	0	2	1	X	7
Alberta (Park)	0	0	1	1	1	0	1	0	0	X	4

Sheet I	1	2	3	4	5	6	7	8	9	10	Final
New Brunswick (McGuire) 🔨	1	0	3	0	2	0	1	4	X	X	11
Nova Scotia (Christianson)	0	1	0	1	0	1	0	0	X	X	3

==== Draw 16 ====
Sheet C	1	2	3	4	5	6	7	8	9	10	Final
Saskatchewan (Surik) 🔨	0	2	0	1	0	3	1	0	3	X	10
Yukon (Koltun)	0	0	4	0	1	0	0	1	0	X	6

Sheet E	1	2	3	4	5	6	7	8	9	10	Final
Prince Edward Island (Carmody) 🔨	2	2	0	2	1	1	1	X	X	X	9
Northwest Territories (Cormier)	0	0	1	0	0	0	0	X	X	X	1

Sheet G	1	2	3	4	5	6	7	8	9	10	Final
Northern Ontario (Horgan) 🔨	0	1	0	1	1	0	0	4	1	X	8
Quebec (Routledge)	0	0	1	0	0	1	1	0	0	X	3

Sheet I	1	2	3	4	5	6	7	8	9	10	Final
British Columbia (Sivertson) 🔨	2	0	1	0	1	0	0	1	1	X	6
Alberta (Park)	0	1	0	2	0	0	0	0	0	X	3

==== Draw 17 ====
Sheet B	1	2	3	4	5	6	7	8	9	10	Final
Manitoba (Neufeld) 🔨	2	1	1	0	2	0	1	1	X	X	8
Northern Ontario (Horgan)	0	0	0	1	0	1	0	0	X	X	2

Sheet D	1	2	3	4	5	6	7	8	9	10	Final
Alberta (Park) 🔨	2	0	0	0	1	0	1	0	0	X	4
Nova Scotia (Christianson)	0	1	1	1	0	2	0	1	1	X	7

Sheet E	1	2	3	4	5	6	7	8	9	10	11	Final
Newfoundland and Labrador (Devereaux) 🔨	0	1	0	0	2	0	0	0	3	2	1	9
New Brunswick (McGuire)	1	0	1	1	0	0	1	4	0	0	0	8

Sheet H	1	2	3	4	5	6	7	8	9	10	Final
Yukon (Koltun) 🔨	0	0	1	0	2	1	1	0	0	X	5
Ontario (Nicol)	2	1	0	3	0	0	0	1	1	X	8

==== Draw 18 ====
Sheet B	1	2	3	4	5	6	7	8	9	10	Final
New Brunswick (McGuire) 🔨	2	0	0	3	0	0	2	4	0	X	11
British Columbia (Sivertson)	0	2	1	0	1	1	0	0	1	X	6

Sheet D	1	2	3	4	5	6	7	8	9	10	Final
Ontario (Nicol) 🔨	1	0	0	0	1	0	2	1	1	X	6
Prince Edward Island (Carmody)	0	1	1	0	0	1	0	0	0	X	3

Sheet F	1	2	3	4	5	6	7	8	9	10	Final
Quebec (Routledge) 🔨	1	0	2	1	2	0	0	0	1	0	7
Saskatchewan (Surik)	0	3	0	0	0	1	1	2	0	1	8

Sheet H	1	2	3	4	5	6	7	8	9	10	Final
Nova Scotia (Christianson) 🔨	1	0	1	0	0	1	1	0	1	0	5
Manitoba (Neufeld)	0	1	0	1	1	0	0	2	0	1	6

Sheet J	1	2	3	4	5	6	7	8	9	10	Final
Northwest Territories (Cormier) 🔨	1	0	0	0	0	0	2	1	1	0	5
Newfoundland and Labrador (Devereaux)	0	0	1	1	1	2	0	0	0	1	6

=== Playoffs ===
Tiebreaker		Semifinal		Final
Saskatchewan	3
Manitoba	9	Manitoba	7
		British Columbia	3
				Newfoundland and Labrador	7
				Manitoba	6

==== Tiebreaker ====
Sheet H	1	2	3	4	5	6	7	8	9	10	Final
Saskatchewan (Surik) 🔨	0	1	0	0	0	1	0	1	X	X	3
Manitoba (Neufeld)	3	0	1	1	1	0	3	0	X	X	9

Player percentages
Saskatchewan		Manitoba	
Brittany Lemon	80%	Breanne Meakin	63%
Cris Goertzen	64%	Laryssa Grenkow	81%
Val Sweeting	61%	Sabrina Neufeld	69%
Hailey Surik	50%	Calleen Neufeld	83%
Total	64%	Total	74%

==== Semi final ====
Sheet I	1	2	3	4	5	6	7	8	9	10	Final
Manitoba (Neufeld)	0	0	2	0	1	0	2	2	0	X	7
British Columbia (Sivertson) 🔨	0	0	0	1	0	1	0	0	1	X	3

Player percentages
Manitoba		British Columbia	
Breanne Meakin	65%	Megan Reid	63%
Laryssa Grenkow	84%	Kristen Mitchell	63%
Sabrina Neufeld	59%	Steph Jackson	63%
Calleen Neufeld	83%	Dailene Sivertson	65%
Total	73%	Total	63%

==== Final ====
Sheet B	1	2	3	4	5	6	7	8	9	10	Final
Newfoundland and Labrador (Deveraux) 🔨	1	0	0	0	1	0	2	0	0	3	7
Manitoba (Neufeld)	0	1	1	0	0	0	0	3	1	0	6

Player percentages
Newfoundland and Labrador		Manitoba	
Julie Devereaux	85%	Breanne Meakin	76%
Sarah Paul	74%	Laryssa Grenkow	94%
Steph Guzzwell	78%	Sabrina Neufeld	66%
Stacie Devereaux	73%	Calleen Neufeld	71%
Total	77%	Total	77%

== Qualification ==
=== Ontario ===
The Pepsi Ontario Junior Curling Championships were held January 3–7 at the Brockville Country Club in Brockville.

Hollie Nicol of the KW Granite Club defeated Brit O'Neill from the Glendale club in Hamilton 8-6 in the women's final. Nicol had beaten the Rachel Homan rink from the City View club in Ottawa 9-4 in the semifinals.

In the men's final, Ryan Myler out of Brampton defeated Christian Tolusso of Manotick 5-4. Myler had beaten Scott McDonald of London in the semifinal.
