= 2013 Canad Inns Prairie Classic =

- Host city: Portage la Prairie, Manitoba
- Arena: Portage Curling Club
- Dates: October 18–21
- Winner: (Manitoba) Mike McEwen
- Curling club: Assiniboine Memorial CC, Winnipeg
- Skip: Mike McEwen
- Third: B. J. Neufeld
- Second: Matt Wozniak
- Lead: Denni Neufeld
- Finalist: (Ontario) Glenn Howard

The 2013 Canad Inns Prairie Classic was held from October 18 to 21 at the Portage Curling Club in Portage la Prairie, Manitoba as part of the 2013–14 World Curling Tour. The event was held in a triple-knockout format, and the purse for the event was CAD$60,000, of which the winner, Mike McEwen, received CAD$18,000. McEwen defeated Glenn Howard in the final with a score of 6–2.

== Teams ==
The teams are listed as follows:

Skip	Third	Second	Lead	Locale
Brennan Wark (fourth)	Brian Adams, Jr. (skip)	Jordan Potts	Joel Adams	Thunder Bay, Ontario
Evgeniy Arkhipov	Sergei Glukhov	Dmitry Mironov	Artur Razhabov	Moscow, Russia
Dennis Bohn	David Bohn	Dillon Bednarek	Larry Solomon	Winnipeg, Manitoba
Richard Daneault	Chris Galbraith	Braden Zawada	Mike Neufeld	Winnipeg, Manitoba
Andrey Drozdov	Petr Dron	Alexey Stukalskiy	Anton Kalalb	Moscow, Russia
Niklas Edin	Sebastian Kraupp	Fredrik Lindberg	Viktor Kjäll	Karlstad, Sweden
John Epping	Scott Bailey	Collin Mitchell	David Mathers	Toronto, Ontario
Oskar Eriksson	Kristian Lindström	Markus Eriksson	Christoffer Sundgren	Lit, Sweden
Rob Fowler	Allan Lyburn	Brendan Taylor	Derek Samagalski	Brandon, Manitoba
Sean Grassie	Corey Chambers	Kody Janzen	Stuart Shiells	Winnipeg, Manitoba
Brad Gushue	Brett Gallant	Adam Casey	Geoff Walker	St. John's, Newfoundland and Labrador
Jeff Hartung	Kody Hartung	Tyler Hartung	Claire DeCock	Langenburg, Saskatchewan
Markus Høiberg	Steffen Mellemsetter	Steffen Walstad	Magnus Nedregotten	Oppdal, Norway
Glenn Howard	Wayne Middaugh	Brent Laing	Craig Savill	Penetanguishene, Ontario
Ryan Hyde	Dean Moxham	Ken Keeler	Bruce Belton	Portage la Prairie, Manitoba
Brad Jacobs	Ryan Fry	E. J. Harnden	Ryan Harnden	Sault Ste. Marie, Ontario
Joel Jordison	Jason Ackerman	Brent Goeres	Curtis Horwath	Regina, Saskatchewan
Mark Kean	Travis Fanset	Patrick Janssen	Tim March	Ontario
Kevin Koe	Pat Simmons	Carter Rycroft	Nolan Thiessen	Calgary, Alberta
Jared Kolomaya	Neil Kitching	Kennedy Bird	Daniel Hunt	Winnipeg, Manitoba
Steve Laycock	Kirk Muyres	Colton Flasch	Dallan Muyres	Saskatoon, Saskatchewan
Liu Rui	Zang Jialiang	Xu Xiaoming	Ba Dexin	Harbin, China
William Lyburn	Alex Forrest	Connor Njegovan	Tyler Forrest	Winnipeg, Manitoba
Jack McDonald	Barry Paddock	Rodney Legault	Justin Paddock	Winnipeg, Manitoba
Mike McEwen	B. J. Neufeld	Matt Wozniak	Denni Neufeld	Winnipeg, Manitoba
Jim Cotter (fourth)	John Morris (skip)	Tyrel Griffith	Rick Sawatsky	Vernon, British Columbia
Don Nelson	Richard Muntain	Mike McCaughan	Gary Maunula	Winnipeg, Manitoba
John Shuster	Jeff Isaacson	Jared Zezel	John Landsteiner	Duluth, Minnesota
Steen Sigurdson	Riley Smith	Ian McMillan	Nick Curtis	Winnipeg, Manitoba
Jeff Stoughton	Jon Mead	Reid Carruthers	Mark Nichols	Winnipeg, Manitoba
Geoff Trimble	Jeff Stewart	Darren Pennell	Alan Christison	Gladstone, Manitoba
Brock Virtue	Braeden Moskowy	Chris Schille	D. J. Kidby	Regina, Saskatchewan

== Knockout results ==
The draw is listed as follows:

=== A event ===
First Knockout
(Ontario) Mark Kean	7
(Russia) Andrey Drozdov	3
(Sweden) Niklas Edin	5
(Manitoba) Steen Sigurdson	4
(Manitoba) Jeff Stoughton	4
(Russia) Evgeniy Arkhipov	5
(Saskatchewan) Jeff Hartung	5
(Minnesota) John Shuster	6
(Newfoundland and Labrador) Brad Gushue	5
(Manitoba) Richard Daneault	2
(Saskatchewan) Steve Laycock	8
(Manitoba) Geoff Trimble	1
(Alberta) Kevin Koe	6
(Manitoba) Jack McDonald	4
(Manitoba) Rob Fowler	3
(Norway) Markus Høiberg	2

Quarterfinals
(Ontario) Mark Kean	1
(Sweden) Niklas Edin	6
(Russia) Evgeniy Arkhipov	2
(Minnesota) John Shuster	4
(Newfoundland and Labrador) Brad Gushue	5
(Saskatchewan) Steve Laycock	7
(Alberta) Kevin Koe	6
(Manitoba) Rob Fowler	4

Semifinals
(Sweden) Niklas Edin	3
(Minnesota) John Shuster	5
(Saskatchewan) Steve Laycock	4
(Alberta) Kevin Koe	7

Qualifier 1
(Minnesota) John Shuster	0
(Alberta) Kevin Koe	5

First Knockout
(British Columbia) John Morris	10
(Manitoba) Don Nelson	1
(Ontario) John Epping	3
(Sweden) Oskar Eriksson	5
(China) Liu Rui	7
(Manitoba) Sean Grassie	8
(Manitoba) Mike McEwen	7
(Ontario) Brian Adams, Jr.	6
(Manitoba) William Lyburn	6
(Saskatchewan) Joel Jordison	7
(Ontario) Brad Jacobs	8
(Manitoba) Dennis Bohn	1
(Ontario) Glenn Howard	7
(Manitoba) Jared Kolomaya	2
(Saskatchewan) Brock Virtue	8
(Manitoba) Ryan Hyde	2

Quarterfinals
(British Columbia) John Morris	6
(Sweden) Oskar Eriksson	5
(Manitoba) Sean Grassie	5
(Manitoba) Mike McEwen	6
(Saskatchewan) Joel Jordison	3
(Ontario) Brad Jacobs	7
(Ontario) Glenn Howard	3
(Saskatchewan) Brock Virtue	5

Semifinals
(British Columbia) John Morris	2
(Manitoba) Mike McEwen	7
(Ontario) Brad Jacobs	1
(Saskatchewan) Brock Virtue	6

Qualifier 2
(Manitoba) Mike McEwen	8
(Saskatchewan) Brock Virtue	3

=== B event ===
Second Knockout
(Russia) Andrey Drozdov	8
(Manitoba) Steen Sigurdson	7
(Manitoba) Jeff Stoughton	5
(Saskatchewan) Jeff Hartung	4

Quarterfinals
(Manitoba) Rob Fowler	6
(Russia) Andrey Drozdov	2
(Newfoundland and Labrador) Brad Gushue	1
(Manitoba) Jeff Stoughton	5

Semifinals
(Manitoba) Rob Fowler	3
(British Columbia) John Morris	5
(Manitoba) Jeff Stoughton	4
(Ontario) Brad Jacobs	6

To Qualifier 3
(British Columbia) John Morris	5
(Ontario) Brad Jacobs	7
Qualifier 3
(Ontario) Brad Jacobs	4
(Ontario) Mark Kean	5

Second Knockout
(Manitoba) Richard Daneault	9
(Manitoba) Geoff Trimble	0
(Manitoba) Jack McDonald	6
(Norway) Markus Høiberg	7

Quarterfinals
(Russia) Evgeniy Arkhipov	4
(Manitoba) Richard Daneault	6
(Ontario) Mark Kean	7
(Norway) Markus Høiberg	3

Semifinals
(Manitoba) Richard Daneault	3
(Ontario) Mark Kean	5

To Qualifier 3
(Ontario) Mark Kean	7
(Saskatchewan) Brock Virtue	6

Second Knockout
(Manitoba) Don Nelson	3
(Ontario) John Epping	8
(China) Liu Rui	5
(Ontario) Brian Adams, Jr.	6

Quarterfinals
(Ontario) Glenn Howard	6
(Ontario) John Epping	4
(Saskatchewan) Joel Jordison	3
(Ontario) Brian Adams, Jr.	8

Semifinals
(Ontario) Glenn Howard	6
(Sweden) Niklas Edin	1
(Ontario) Brian Adams, Jr.	6
(Saskatchewan) Steve Laycock	5

To Qualifier 4
(Ontario) Glenn Howard	7
(Ontario) Brian Adams, Jr.	0
Qualifier 4
(Ontario) Glenn Howard	6
(Minnesota) John Shuster	5

Second Knockout
(Manitoba) William Lyburn	5
(Manitoba) Dennis Bohn	6
(Manitoba) Jared Kolomaya	7
(Manitoba) Ryan Hyde	3

Quarterfinals
(Manitoba) Sean Grassie	6
(Manitoba) Dennis Bohn	2
(Sweden) Oskar Eriksson	7
(Manitoba) Jared Kolomaya	3

Semifinals
(Manitoba) Sean Grassie	2
(Sweden) Oskar Eriksson	4

To Qualifier 4
(Sweden) Oskar Eriksson	3
(Minnesota) John Shuster	4

=== C event ===
Third Knockout
(Manitoba) Steen Sigurdson	6
(Saskatchewan) Jeff Hartung	5
(Manitoba) Jack McDonald	6
(Manitoba) Geoff Trimble	2

Quarterfinals
(Sweden) Niklas Edin	6
(Manitoba) Steen Sigurdson	4
(Saskatchewan) Steve Laycock	7
(Manitoba) Jack McDonald	2

Semifinals
(Sweden) Niklas Edin	5
(Saskatchewan) Steve Laycock	2

Qualifier 5
(Sweden) Niklas Edin	2
(Ontario) Brad Jacobs	5

Third Knockout
(Russia) Andrey Drozdov	8
(Newfoundland and Labrador) Brad Gushue	5

Quarterfinals
(Russia) Evgeniy Arkhipov	6
(Norway) Markus Høiberg	3
(Manitoba) Sean Grassie	5
(Russia) Andrey Drozdov	4

Semifinals
(Russia) Evgeniy Arkhipov	1
(British Columbia) John Morris	7
(Manitoba) Sean Grassie	8
(Ontario) Brian Adams, Jr.	5

Qualifier 6
(British Columbia) John Morris	6
(Manitoba) Sean Grassie	2

Third Knockout
(Ontario) John Epping	7
(Saskatchewan) Joel Jordison	5

Quarterfinals
(Manitoba) Rob Fowler	5
(Ontario) John Epping	6
(Manitoba) Dennis Bohn	2
(Manitoba) Jared Kolomaya	8

Semifinals
(Ontario) John Epping	3
(Sweden) Oskar Eriksson	6
(Manitoba) Jared Kolomaya	3
(Saskatchewan) Brock Virtue	7

Qualifier 7
(Sweden) Oskar Eriksson	7
(Saskatchewan) Brock Virtue	8

Third Knockout
(Manitoba) Don Nelson	2
(China) Liu Rui	6
(Manitoba) William Lyburn	6
(Manitoba) Ryan Hyde	0

Quarterfinals
(Manitoba) Jeff Stoughton	6
(China) Liu Rui	2
(Manitoba) Richard Daneault	8
(Manitoba) William Lyburn	3

Semifinals
(Manitoba) Jeff Stoughton	6
(Manitoba) Richard Daneault	3

Qualifier 8
(Manitoba) Jeff Stoughton	7
(Minnesota) John Shuster	4

== Playoffs ==
Quarterfinals
(Alberta) Kevin Koe	7
(Ontario) Brad Jacobs	6
(Ontario) Glenn Howard	6
(British Columbia) John Morris	5
(Ontario) Mark Kean	3
(Saskatchewan) Brock Virtue	4
(Manitoba) Mike McEwen	6
(Manitoba) Jeff Stoughton	3

Semifinals
(Alberta) Kevin Koe	3
(Ontario) Glenn Howard	5
(Saskatchewan) Brock Virtue	5
(Manitoba) Mike McEwen	6

Final
(Ontario) Glenn Howard	2
(Manitoba) Mike McEwen	6
