= 2011 Players' Championship =

Grand Slam of Curling event

2011 GP Car and Home Players' Championship
- Host city: Grande Prairie, Alberta
- Arena: Crystal Centre
- Dates: April 12–17
- Men's winner: (Alberta) Kevin Martin
- Curling club: Saville Sports Centre, Edmonton
- Skip: Kevin Martin
- Third: John Morris
- Second: Marc Kennedy
- Lead: Ben Hebert
- Finalist: (Sweden) Niklas Edin
- Women's winner: (Manitoba) Jennifer Jones
- Curling club: St. Vital CC, Winnipeg
- Skip: Jennifer Jones
- Third: Kaitlyn Lawes
- Second: Jill Officer
- Lead: Dawn Askin
- Finalist: (Ontario) Rachel Homan

The 2011 GP Car and Home Players' Championship was a Grand Slam curling bonspiel held at the Crystal Centre in Grande Prairie, Alberta from April 12–17. It features a men's and women's draw, where the top sixteen teams from the Order of Merit rankings for the 2010-11 curling season are invited to compete. It was the final Grand Slam event for the season, and one of the last curling events for the season. The purse for the men's and women's event was CAD$100,000 each.

On the men's side, Kevin Martin won his record seventh Players' championship with a win over Niklas Edin in seven ends, while Jennifer Jones secured her fourth Players' championship with a win over Ontario junior champion Rachel Homan after a big eighth end.

== Men ==
=== Teams ===
Skip	Third	Second	Lead	Locale
Brent Bawel	Sean O'Connor	Scott Manners	Hardi Sulimma	(Alberta) Calgary
Mathew Camm	Scott Howard	David Mathers	Andrew Hamilton	(Ontario) Ottawa
Niklas Edin	Sebastian Kraupp	Fredrik Lindberg	Viktor Kjäll	(Sweden) Karlstad
John Epping	Scott Bailey	Darryl Preble	Trevor Wall	(Ontario) Toronto
Rob Fowler	Allan Lyburn	Richard Daneault	Derek Samagalski	(Manitoba) Brandon
Glenn Howard	Richard Hart	Brent Laing	Craig Savill	(Ontario) Coldwater
Brad Jacobs	Ted Appelman	Ryan Harnden	Scott Seabrook	(Ontario) Sault Ste. Marie
Kevin Koe	Blake MacDonald	Carter Rycroft	Nolan Thiessen	(Alberta) Edmonton
Kevin Martin	John Morris	Marc Kennedy	Ben Hebert	(Alberta) Edmonton
Mike McEwen	B.J. Neufeld	Matt Wozniak	Denni Neufeld	(Manitoba) Winnipeg
Braeden Moskowy	Kirk Muyres	Colton Flasch	Matt Lang	(Saskatchewan) Regina
Dan Petryk	Steve Petryk (skip)	Colin Hodgson	Brad Chyz	(Alberta) Calgary
Robert Schlender	Chris Lemishka	Jeff Sharp	Darcy Hafso	(Alberta) Edmonton
Pat Simmons	Steve Laycock	Brennen Jones	Dallan Muyres	(Saskatchewan) Davidson
Jeff Stoughton	Jon Mead	Reid Carruthers	Steve Gould	(Manitoba) Winnipeg
Brock Virtue	J. D. Lind	Geoff Walker	Matthew Ng	(Alberta) Calgary

=== Knockout brackets ===
==== A event ====
First Knockout		Semifinals		Qualifier 1
(Ontario) Howard	7
(Alberta) Virtue	5	(Ontario) Howard	9
(Saskatchewan) Simmons	7	(Saskatchewan) Simmons	4
(Alberta) Schlender	6			(Ontario) Howard	1
(Ontario) Epping	5			(Alberta) Martin	5
(Manitoba) Fowler	6	(Manitoba) Fowler	4
(Alberta) Martin	5	(Alberta) Martin	5
(Alberta) Petryk	2

First Knockout		Semifinals		Qualifier 2
(Manitoba) McEwen	7
(Saskatchewan) Moskowy	9	(Saskatchewan) Moskowy	3
(Sweden) Edin	6	(Sweden) Edin	9
(Ontario) Jacobs	5			(Sweden) Edin	7
(Manitoba) Stoughton	9			(Manitoba) Stoughton	4
(Alberta) Bawel	3	(Manitoba) Stoughton	9
(Alberta) Koe	9	(Alberta) Koe	4
(Ontario) Camm	3

==== B event ====
Second Knockout		Semifinals		Qualifier 3
(Alberta) Virtue	5
(Alberta) Schlender	10	(Alberta) Schlender	6
(Ontario) Epping	1	(Alberta) Petryk	1
(Alberta) Petryk	8			(Alberta) Schlender	3
				(Manitoba) Stoughton	7

Second Knockout		Semifinals		Qualifier 4
(Manitoba) McEwen	5
(Ontario) Jacobs	6	(Ontario) Jacobs	6
(Alberta) Bawel	5	(Ontario) Camm	2
(Ontario) Camm	8			(Ontario) Jacobs	2
				(Ontario) Howard	5

Second Knockout		Qualifier 5
(Saskatchewan) Simmons	5
(Manitoba) Fowler	6	(Manitoba) Fowler	6
(Saskatchewan) Moskowy	4	(Alberta) Koe	7
(Alberta) Koe	6

==== C event ====
Third Knockout		Semifinals		Qualifier 6
(Alberta) Virtue	1
(Ontario) Epping	7	(Ontario) Epping	5
		(Saskatchewan) Moskowy	8
				(Saskatchewan) Moskowy	7
				(Ontario) Jacobs	5

Third Knockout		Semifinals		Qualifier 7
(Manitoba) McEwen	9
(Alberta) Bawel	2	(Manitoba) McEwen	5
		(Saskatchewan) Simmons	1
				(Manitoba) McEwen	6
				(Alberta) Schlender	5

Third Knockout		Qualifier 8
(Alberta) Petryk	5
(Ontario) Camm	4	(Alberta) Petryk	5
		(Manitoba) Fowler	6

=== Knockout results ===
==== Draw 2 ====
Tuesday, April 12, 8:30 pm

Sheet A	1	2	3	4	5	6	7	8	Final
(Saskatchewan) Pat Simmons 🔨	0	2	1	1	0	1	0	2	7
(Alberta) Robert Schlender	3	0	0	0	2	0	1	0	6

Sheet B	1	2	3	4	5	6	7	8	Final
(Sweden) Niklas Edin 🔨	1	0	1	0	2	0	1	1	6
(Ontario) Brad Jacobs	0	2	0	1	0	2	0	0	5

==== Draw 3 ====
Wednesday, April 13, 10:00 am

Sheet A	1	2	3	4	5	6	7	8	Final
(Ontario) Glenn Howard 🔨	1	3	0	0	2	0	0	1	7
(Alberta) Brock Virtue	0	0	2	0	0	2	1	0	5

==== Draw 4 ====
Wednesday, April 13, 1:30 pm

Sheet A	1	2	3	4	5	6	7	8	Final
(Ontario) John Epping	0	0	1	0	2	0	1	1	5
(Manitoba) Rob Fowler 🔨	2	1	0	2	0	1	0	0	6

Sheet B	1	2	3	4	5	6	7	8	Final
(Alberta) Kevin Martin 🔨	0	1	1	1	1	1	0	X	5
(Alberta) Steve Petryk	1	0	0	0	0	0	1	X	2

Sheet C	1	2	3	4	5	6	7	8	Final
(Manitoba) Mike McEwen 🔨	2	0	0	2	0	2	0	1	7
(Saskatchewan) Braeden Moskowy	0	3	1	0	2	0	3	0	9

Sheet D	1	2	3	4	5	6	7	8	Final
(Manitoba) Jeff Stoughton 🔨	1	2	0	4	0	0	2	X	9
(Alberta) Brent Bawel	0	0	2	0	0	1	0	X	3

Sheet E	1	2	3	4	5	6	7	8	Final
(Alberta) Kevin Koe 🔨	1	0	1	3	0	4	X	X	9
(Ontario) Mathew Camm	0	1	0	0	2	0	X	X	3

==== Draw 5 ====
Wednesday, April 13, 5:00 pm

Sheet D	1	2	3	4	5	6	7	8	Final
(Ontario) Glenn Howard 🔨	2	0	3	0	2	0	2	X	9
(Saskatchewan) Pat Simmons	0	1	0	2	0	1	0	X	4

==== Draw 6 ====
Wednesday, April 13, 8:30 pm

Sheet A	1	2	3	4	5	6	7	8	Final
(Saskatchewan) Braeden Moskowy	0	1	0	0	2	0	X	X	3
(Sweden) Niklas Edin 🔨	2	0	3	1	0	3	X	X	9

Sheet B	1	2	3	4	5	6	7	8	Final
(Alberta) Brock Virtue	0	2	0	2	0	1	0	X	5
(Alberta) Robert Schlender 🔨	2	0	3	0	3	0	2	X	10

Sheet C	1	2	3	4	5	6	7	8	Final
(Ontario) John Epping	0	0	1	0	0	0	X	X	1
(Alberta) Steve Petryk 🔨	3	0	0	1	2	2	X	X	8

Sheet D	1	2	3	4	5	6	7	8	Final
(Manitoba) Mike McEwen	0	0	1	1	0	2	1	0	5
(Ontario) Brad Jacobs 🔨	3	1	0	0	1	0	0	1	6

Sheet E	1	2	3	4	5	6	7	8	Final
(Alberta) Brent Bawel	0	1	0	0	3	1	0	X	5
(Ontario) Mathew Camm 🔨	4	0	1	2	0	0	1	X	8

==== Draw 8 ====
Thursday, April 14, 1:30 pm

Sheet C	1	2	3	4	5	6	7	8	Final
(Manitoba) Rob Fowler	0	0	2	0	0	0	1	1	4
(Alberta) Kevin Martin 🔨	0	2	0	0	2	1	0	0	5

Sheet D	1	2	3	4	5	6	7	8	Final
(Manitoba) Jeff Stoughton 🔨	1	1	0	3	1	0	3	X	9
(Alberta) Kevin Koe	0	0	2	0	0	2	0	X	4

==== Draw 9 ====
Thursday, April 14, 5:00 pm

Sheet A	1	2	3	4	5	6	7	8	Final
(Alberta) Robert Schlender	1	0	1	0	0	2	2	X	6
(Alberta) Steve Petryk 🔨	0	0	0	0	1	0	0	X	1

Sheet B	1	2	3	4	5	6	7	8	Final
(Ontario) Brad Jacobs 🔨	2	0	3	0	1	0	X	X	6
(Ontario) Mathew Camm	0	1	0	0	0	1	X	X	2

Sheet C	1	2	3	4	5	6	7	8	Final
(Alberta) Brock Virtue	0	0	1	0	0	0	X	X	1
(Ontario) John Epping 🔨	2	2	0	0	2	1	X	X	7

Sheet D	1	2	3	4	5	6	7	8	Final
(Manitoba) Mike McEwen	0	1	2	0	0	6	X	X	9
(Alberta) Brent Bawel 🔨	1	0	0	1	0	0	X	X	2

Sheet E	1	2	3	4	5	6	7	8	Final
(Saskatchewan) Pat Simmons	1	0	2	0	0	0	2	0	5
(Manitoba) Rob Fowler 🔨	0	2	0	2	0	0	0	2	6

==== Draw 10 ====
Thursday, April 14, 8:30 pm

Sheet B	1	2	3	4	5	6	7	8	Final
(Sweden) Niklas Edin	1	0	2	0	1	0	1	2	7
(Manitoba) Jeff Stoughton 🔨	0	2	0	2	0	0	0	0	4

Sheet D	1	2	3	4	5	6	7	8	Final
(Ontario) Glenn Howard	0	0	0	0	1	0	0	X	1
(Alberta) Kevin Martin 🔨	0	2	1	0	0	1	1	X	5

==== Draw 11 ====
Friday, April 15, 10:00 am

Sheet A	1	2	3	4	5	6	7	8	Final
(Saskatchewan) Braeden Moskowy	0	1	0	2	0	0	1	0	4
(Alberta) Kevin Koe 🔨	1	0	1	0	2	1	0	1	6

==== Draw 12 ====
Friday, April 15, 1:30 pm

Sheet A	1	2	3	4	5	6	7	8	Final
(Ontario) Brad Jacobs 🔨	0	1	0	0	1	0	0	X	2
(Ontario) Glenn Howard	0	0	1	0	0	0	4	X	5

Sheet D	1	2	3	4	5	6	7	8	Final
(Alberta) Robert Schlender	0	0	1	0	0	1	1	0	3
(Manitoba) Jeff Stoughton 🔨	1	2	0	1	1	0	0	2	7

==== Draw 13 ====
Friday, April 15, 5:00 pm

Sheet B	1	2	3	4	5	6	7	8	9	Final
(Manitoba) Rob Fowler 🔨	0	1	0	2	0	1	0	2	0	6
(Alberta) Kevin Koe	1	0	3	0	1	0	1	0	1	7

Sheet C	1	2	3	4	5	6	7	8	Final
(Ontario) John Epping 🔨	2	0	0	2	0	1	0	X	5
(Saskatchewan) Braeden Moskowy	0	3	2	0	1	0	2	X	8

Sheet D	1	2	3	4	5	6	7	8	Final
(Manitoba) Mike McEwen	0	0	1	1	1	0	2	X	5
(Saskatchewan) Pat Simmons 🔨	0	0	0	0	0	1	0	X	1

Sheet E	1	2	3	4	5	6	7	8	Final
(Alberta) Steve Petryk 🔨	2	0	0	0	2	0	0	1	5
(Ontario) Mathew Camm	0	2	1	1	0	0	0	0	4

==== Draw 15 ====
Saturday, April 16, 10:00 am

Sheet A	1	2	3	4	5	6	7	8	9	Final
(Alberta) Steve Petryk 🔨	1	0	1	0	1	0	1	1	0	5
(Manitoba) Rob Fowler	0	1	0	3	0	1	0	0	1	6

Sheet C	1	2	3	4	5	6	7	8	Final
(Manitoba) Mike McEwen 🔨	0	1	0	1	2	0	0	2	6
(Alberta) Robert Schlender	0	0	2	0	0	2	1	0	5

Sheet E	1	2	3	4	5	6	7	8	Final
(Saskatchewan) Braeden Moskowy 🔨	1	0	1	0	2	0	2	1	7
(Ontario) Brad Jacobs	0	2	0	1	0	2	0	0	5

=== Playoffs ===
Quarterfinals		Semifinals		Final
(Alberta) Martin	6
(Saskatchewan) Moskowy	2	(Alberta) Martin	7
(Manitoba) Stoughton	4	(Alberta) Koe	6
(Alberta) Koe	5			(Alberta) Martin	6
(Sweden) Edin	6			(Sweden) Edin	3
(Manitoba) Fowler	5	(Sweden) Edin	5
(Ontario) Howard	5	(Ontario) Howard	4
(Manitoba) McEwen	3

==== Quarterfinals ====
Saturday, April 16, 5:00 pm

Sheet B	1	2	3	4	5	6	7	8	Final
(Alberta) Kevin Martin 🔨	0	0	2	0	2	0	2	X	6
(Saskatchewan) Braeden Moskowy	0	0	0	1	0	1	0	X	2

Sheet C	1	2	3	4	5	6	7	8	9	Final
(Manitoba) Jeff Stoughton	0	0	2	0	0	1	0	1	0	4
(Alberta) Kevin Koe 🔨	1	1	0	1	1	0	0	0	1	5

Sheet D	1	2	3	4	5	6	7	8	Final
(Sweden) Niklas Edin 🔨	1	2	0	1	0	2	0	0	6
(Manitoba) Rob Fowler	0	0	1	0	1	0	2	1	5

Sheet E	1	2	3	4	5	6	7	8	Final
(Ontario) Glenn Howard 🔨	0	0	3	0	0	1	1	X	5
(Manitoba) Mike McEwen	0	1	0	2	0	0	0	X	3

==== Semifinals ====
Saturday, April 16, 8:30 pm

Sheet B	1	2	3	4	5	6	7	8	Final
(Alberta) Kevin Martin 🔨	2	0	2	0	0	1	0	2	7
(Alberta) Kevin Koe	0	1	0	2	1	0	2	0	6

Sheet D	1	2	3	4	5	6	7	8	9	Final
(Sweden) Niklas Edin 🔨	1	0	1	0	0	2	0	0	1	5
(Ontario) Glenn Howard	0	0	0	0	1	0	2	1	0	4

==== Final ====
Sunday, April 17, 9:30 am

Sheet C	1	2	3	4	5	6	7	8	Final
(Alberta) Kevin Martin 🔨	0	1	0	3	1	1	0	X	6
(Sweden) Niklas Edin	1	0	1	0	0	0	1	X	3

== Women ==
=== Teams ===
Skip	Third	Second	Lead	Locale
Sherry Anderson	Sherri Singler	Heather Walsh	Donna Gignac	(Saskatchewan) Saskatoon
Cheryl Bernard	Susan O'Connor	Carolyn Darbyshire	Cori Morris	(Alberta) Calgary
Chelsea Carey	Kristy Jenion	Kristen Foster	Lindsay Titheridge	(Manitoba) Winnipeg
Anna Hasselborg	Sabina Kraupp	Agnes Knochenhauer	Zandra Flyg	Sweden
Rachel Homan	Emma Miskew	Alison Kreviazuk	Lisa Weagle	(Ontario) Ottawa
Jennifer Jones	Kaitlyn Lawes	Jill Officer	Dawn Askin	(Manitoba) Winnipeg
Jessie Kaufman	Nicky Kaufman	Amanda Coderre	Stephanie Enright	(Alberta) Edmonton
Shannon Kleibrink	Amy Nixon	Bronwen Webster	Chelsey Bell	(Alberta) Calgary
Sherry Middaugh	Jo-Ann Rizzo	Lee Merklinger	Leigh Armstrong	(Ontario) Coldwater
Eve Muirhead	Kelly Wood	Lorna Vevers	Anne Laird	(Scotland) Stirling
Heather Nedohin	Beth Iskiw	Jessica Mair	Laine Peters	(Alberta) Edmonton
Mirjam Ott	Carmen Schäfer	Carmen Küng	Janine Greiner	(Switzerland) Davos
Cathy Overton-Clapham	Breanne Meakin	Leslie Wilson-Westcott	Raunora Westcott	(Manitoba) Winnipeg
Desirée Owen	Kalynn Park	Cary-Anne Sallows	Stephanie Malekoff	(Alberta) Grande Prairie
Crystal Webster (Note: Filled in as skip for Krista McCarville)	Ashley Miharija	Kari MacLean	Sarah Lang	(Ontario) Thunder Bay
Stina Viktorsson	Christina Bertrup	Maria Wennerstrom	Margaretha Sigfridsson	Sweden

=== Knockout brackets ===
==== A event ====
First Knockout		Semifinals		Qualifier 1
(Saskatchewan) Anderson	4
(Ontario) Webster	6	(Ontario) Webster	9
(Switzerland) Ott	9	(Switzerland) Ott	7
(Alberta) Kaufman	2			(Ontario) Webster	4
(Manitoba) Overton-Clapham	4			(Alberta) Bernard	6
(Alberta) Bernard	7	(Alberta) Bernard	4
(Alberta) Kleibrink	7	(Alberta) Kleibrink	2
(Alberta) Owen	1

First Knockout		Semifinals		Qualifier 2
(Manitoba) Jones	7
(Sweden) Hasselborg	5	(Manitoba) Jones	7
(Ontario) Homan	3	(Scotland) Muirhead	4
(Scotland) Muirhead	7			(Manitoba) Jones	6
(Alberta) Nedohin	7			(Manitoba) Carey	5
(Ontario) Middaugh	5	(Alberta) Nedohin	4
(Manitoba) Carey	5	(Manitoba) Carey	5
(Sweden) Viktorsson	3

==== B event ====
Second Knockout		Semifinals		Qualifier 3
(Saskatchewan) Anderson	5
(Alberta) Kaufman	6	(Alberta) Kaufman	4
(Manitoba) Overton-Clapham	3	(Alberta) Owen	7
(Alberta) Owen	5			(Alberta) Owen	5
				(Manitoba) Carey	3

Second Knockout		Semifinals		Qualifier 4
(Sweden) Hasselborg	2
(Ontario) Homan	8	(Ontario) Homan	7
(Ontario) Middaugh	5	(Sweden) Viktorsson	5
(Sweden) Viktorsson	7			(Ontario) Homan	10
				(Ontario) Webster	3

Second Knockout		Qualifier 5
(Switzerland) Ott	3
(Alberta) Kleibrink	7	(Alberta) Kleibrink	4
(Scotland) Muirhead	6	(Scotland) Muirhead	5
(Alberta) Nedohin	4

==== C event ====
Third Knockout		Semifinals		Qualifier 6
(Saskatchewan) Anderson	7
(Manitoba) Overton-Clapham	5	(Saskatchewan) Anderson	5
		(Alberta) Nedohin	7
				(Alberta) Nedohin	7
				(Ontario) Webster	6

Third Knockout		Semifinals		Qualifier 7
(Sweden) Hasselborg	2
(Ontario) Middaugh	5	(Ontario) Middaugh	4
		(Switzerland) Ott	5
				(Switzerland) Ott	5
				(Manitoba) Carey	6

Third Knockout		Qualifier 8
(Alberta) Kaufman	3
(Sweden) Viktorsson	6	(Sweden) Viktorsson	4
		(Alberta) Kleibrink	9

=== Knockout results ===
==== Draw 1 ====
Tuesday, April 12, 5:00 pm

Sheet A	1	2	3	4	5	6	7	8	Final
(Saskatchewan) Sherry Anderson	2	0	0	1	0	0	0	1	4
(Ontario) Crystal Webster 🔨	0	2	0	0	2	2	0	0	6

Sheet B	1	2	3	4	5	6	7	8	Final
(Switzerland) Mirjam Ott 🔨	2	0	1	1	0	5	X	X	9
(Alberta) Jessie Kaufman	0	1	0	0	1	0	X	X	2

Sheet C	1	2	3	4	5	6	7	8	9	Final
(Manitoba) Jennifer Jones 🔨	0	0	2	0	2	1	0	0	2	7
(Sweden) Anna Hasselborg	0	1	0	2	0	0	1	1	0	5

Sheet D	1	2	3	4	5	6	7	8	Final
(Alberta) Heather Nedohin 🔨	1	0	2	0	2	2	0	0	7
(Ontario) Sherry Middaugh	0	1	0	1	0	0	2	1	5

Sheet E	1	2	3	4	5	6	7	8	Final
(Manitoba) Chelsea Carey	0	0	1	0	0	2	0	2	5
(Sweden) Stina Viktorsson 🔨	0	0	0	1	1	0	1	0	3

==== Draw 2 ====
Tuesday, April 12, 8:30 pm

Sheet C	1	2	3	4	5	6	7	8	Final
(Manitoba) Cathy Overton-Clapham 🔨	0	2	0	1	0	1	0	0	4
(Alberta) Cheryl Bernard	0	0	3	0	2	0	0	2	7

Sheet D	1	2	3	4	5	6	7	8	Final
(Alberta) Shannon Kleibrink 🔨	2	0	2	1	0	2	X	X	7
(Alberta) Desirée Owen	0	0	0	0	1	0	X	X	1

Sheet E	1	2	3	4	5	6	7	8	Final
(Ontario) Rachel Homan 🔨	1	0	0	0	2	0	0	X	3
(Scotland) Eve Muirhead	0	0	2	1	0	1	3	X	7

==== Draw 3 ====
Wednesday, April 13, 10:00 am

Sheet A	1	2	3	4	5	6	7	8	Final
(Ontario) Crystal Webster	0	1	0	4	0	2	0	2	9
(Switzerland) Mirjam Ott 🔨	2	0	2	0	1	0	2	0	7

Sheet C	1	2	3	4	5	6	7	8	Final
(Alberta) Heather Nedohin 🔨	0	2	0	0	0	2	0	0	4
(Manitoba) Chelsea Carey	0	0	2	2	0	0	0	1	5

Sheet D	1	2	3	4	5	6	7	8	9	Final
(Saskatchewan) Sherry Anderson	0	0	3	0	1	0	0	1	0	5
(Alberta) Jessie Kaufman 🔨	0	3	0	1	0	1	0	0	1	6

Sheet E	1	2	3	4	5	6	7	8	Final
(Ontario) Sherry Middaugh 🔨	0	1	0	1	3	0	0	0	5
(Sweden) Stina Viktorsson	1	0	3	0	0	1	1	1	7

==== Draw 5 ====
Wednesday, April 13, 5:00 pm

Sheet A	1	2	3	4	5	6	7	8	Final
(Alberta) Cheryl Bernard 🔨	0	0	1	0	2	0	0	1	4
(Alberta) Shannon Kleibrink	0	0	0	1	0	0	1	0	2

Sheet B	1	2	3	4	5	6	7	8	Final
(Manitoba) Jennifer Jones 🔨	2	1	0	3	0	0	1	X	7
(Scotland) Eve Muirhead	0	0	2	0	1	1	0	X	4

Sheet C	1	2	3	4	5	6	7	8	Final
(Manitoba) Cathy Overton-Clapham	0	2	0	0	0	1	0	X	3
(Alberta) Desirée Owen 🔨	1	0	1	1	1	0	1	X	5

Sheet E	1	2	3	4	5	6	7	8	Final
(Sweden) Anna Hasselborg 🔨	0	1	0	1	0	0	X	X	2
(Ontario) Rachel Homan	1	0	1	0	3	3	X	X	8

==== Draw 7 ====
Thursday, April 14, 10:00 am

Sheet A	1	2	3	4	5	6	7	8	Final
(Alberta) Jessie Kaufman	0	0	1	1	0	1	1	X	4
(Alberta) Desirée Owen 🔨	1	2	0	0	4	0	0	X	7

Sheet B	1	2	3	4	5	6	7	8	Final
(Ontario) Rachel Homan	0	3	0	2	0	2	0	X	7
(Sweden) Stina Viktorsson 🔨	1	0	0	0	3	0	1	X	5

Sheet C	1	2	3	4	5	6	7	8	Final
(Scotland) Eve Muirhead	0	0	2	0	4	0	0	X	6
(Alberta) Heather Nedohin 🔨	0	1	0	1	0	0	2	X	4

Sheet D	1	2	3	4	5	6	7	8	Final
(Saskatchewan) Sherry Anderson 🔨	1	0	0	0	3	0	2	1	7
(Manitoba) Cathy Overton-Clapham	0	0	3	1	0	1	0	0	5

Sheet E	1	2	3	4	5	6	7	8	Final
(Sweden) Anna Hasselborg 🔨	0	1	0	0	0	1	0	X	2
(Ontario) Sherry Middaugh	0	0	0	3	1	0	1	X	5

==== Draw 8 ====
Thursday, April 14, 1:30 pm

Sheet A	1	2	3	4	5	6	7	8	Final
(Ontario) Crystal Webster	0	0	2	0	0	0	2	0	4
(Alberta) Cheryl Bernard 🔨	0	1	0	2	0	0	0	3	6

Sheet B	1	2	3	4	5	6	7	8	Final
(Manitoba) Jennifer Jones	0	1	0	2	0	2	0	1	6
(Manitoba) Chelsea Carey 🔨	1	0	1	0	2	0	1	0	5

Sheet E	1	2	3	4	5	6	7	8	Final
(Switzerland) Mirjam Ott	0	0	1	0	2	0	0	0	3
(Alberta) Shannon Kleibrink	0	0	0	1	0	3	1	2	7

==== Draw 10 ====
Thursday, April 14, 8:30 pm

Sheet A	1	2	3	4	5	6	7	8	Final
(Alberta) Desirée Owen	0	2	1	1	0	0	1	X	5
(Manitoba) Chelsea Carey	2	0	0	0	0	1	0	X	3

Sheet C	1	2	3	4	5	6	7	8	Final
(Ontario) Rachel Homan	0	2	0	4	0	4	X	X	10
(Ontario) Crystal Webster	1	0	1	0	1	0	X	X	3

Sheet E	1	2	3	4	5	6	7	8	Final
(Alberta) Shannon Kleibrink	0	2	0	1	0	1	0	0	4
(Scotland) Eve Muirhead	0	0	1	0	3	0	0	1	5

==== Draw 11 ====
Friday, April 15, 10:00 am

Sheet B	1	2	3	4	5	6	7	8	Final
(Saskatchewan) Sherry Anderson	0	0	1	0	2	0	2	0	5
(Alberta) Heather Nedohin 🔨	1	3	0	1	0	1	0	1	7

Sheet D	1	2	3	4	5	6	7	8	Final
(Ontario) Sherry Middaugh 🔨	0	1	0	0	0	2	0	1	4
(Switzerland) Mirjam Ott	2	0	1	0	1	0	1	0	5

Sheet E	1	2	3	4	5	6	7	8	Final
(Alberta) Jessie Kaufman	0	1	0	0	0	1	1	X	3
(Sweden) Stina Viktorsson 🔨	2	0	2	1	1	0	0	X	5

==== Draw 12 ====
Friday, April 15, 1:30 pm

Sheet B	1	2	3	4	5	6	7	8	Final
(Alberta) Heather Nedohin 🔨	0	4	0	2	0	1	0	0	7
(Ontario) Crystal Webster	1	0	1	0	1	0	1	2	6

Sheet C	1	2	3	4	5	6	7	8	Final
(Switzerland) Mirjam Ott 🔨	2	0	1	0	1	0	1	0	5
(Manitoba) Chelsea Carey	0	1	0	1	0	3	0	1	6

Sheet E	1	2	3	4	5	6	7	8	Final
(Sweden) Stina Viktorsson 🔨	1	0	1	1	0	1	0	X	4
(Alberta) Shannon Kleibrink	0	2	0	0	6	0	1	X	9

=== Playoffs ===
Quarterfinals		Semifinals		Final
(Manitoba) Jones	9
(Manitoba) Carey	2	(Manitoba) Jones	7
(Scotland) Muirhead	8	(Scotland) Muirhead	4
(Alberta) Owen	3			(Manitoba) Jones	7
(Alberta) Bernard	4			(Ontario) Homan	5
(Alberta) Nedohin	5	(Alberta) Nedohin	5
(Ontario) Homan	8	(Ontario) Homan	7
(Alberta) Kleibrink	5

==== Quarterfinals ====
Friday, April 15, 8:30 pm

Sheet A	1	2	3	4	5	6	7	8	Final
(Manitoba) Jennifer Jones 🔨	3	1	0	2	0	2	X	X	9
(Manitoba) Chelsea Carey	0	0	1	0	1	0	X	X	2

Sheet B	1	2	3	4	5	6	7	8	Final
(Scotland) Eve Muirhead	0	2	0	3	1	0	2	X	8
(Alberta) Desirée Owen 🔨	0	0	2	0	0	1	0	X	3

Sheet D	1	2	3	4	5	6	7	8	Final
(Alberta) Cheryl Bernard 🔨	2	0	1	1	0	0	0	0	4
(Alberta) Heather Nedohin	0	1	0	0	2	1	0	1	5

Sheet E	1	2	3	4	5	6	7	8	9	Final
(Ontario) Rachel Homan 🔨	1	0	0	1	1	0	2	0	3	8
(Alberta) Shannon Kleibrink	0	1	1	0	0	1	0	2	0	5

==== Semifinals ====
Saturday, April 16, 10:00 am

Sheet B	1	2	3	4	5	6	7	8	Final
(Manitoba) Jennifer Jones 🔨	4	0	0	1	1	0	0	1	7
(Scotland) Eve Muirhead	0	0	2	0	0	1	1	0	4

Sheet D	1	2	3	4	5	6	7	8	Final
(Alberta) Heather Nedohin	0	1	0	2	0	2	0	0	5
(Ontario) Rachel Homan 🔨	1	0	2	0	2	0	1	1	7

==== Final ====
Saturday, April 16, 1:30 pm

Sheet C	1	2	3	4	5	6	7	8	Final
(Manitoba) Jennifer Jones 🔨	1	0	1	0	2	0	0	3	7
(Ontario) Rachel Homan	0	3	0	1	0	1	0	0	5
