= World Financial Group Classic =

Former World Curling Tour event

The World Financial Group Classic was an annual bonspiel, or curling tournament, that took place at the Calgary Curling Club in Calgary, Alberta. The tournament was held in a triple-knockout format in its first year, but was held in a round robin format in 2011. The tournament was part of the World Curling Tour.

== Past champions ==
Only skip's name is displayed.

Year	Winning team	Runner up team	Purse (CAD)
2010	(Alberta) Dean Ross	(Alberta) Don Walchuk	$18,000
2011	(Alberta) Brock Virtue	(Alberta) Tom Appelman	$24,000
