= 2014 SaskTel Tankard =

- Host city: Shaunavon, Saskatchewan
- Arena: Crescent Point Wickenheiser Centre
- Dates: January 29–February 2
- Winner: Steve Laycock
- Curling club: Nutana CC, Saskatoon
- Skip: Steve Laycock
- Third: Kirk Muyres
- Second: Colton Flasch
- Lead: Dallan Muyres
- Finalist: Brock Virtue

The 2014 SaskTel Tankard, the provincial men's curling championship for Saskatchewan, was held from January 29 to February 2 at the Crescent Point Wickenheiser Centre in Shaunavon. The winning Steve Laycock team represented Saskatchewan at the 2014 Tim Hortons Brier in Kamloops.

== Teams ==
The teams are listed as follows:

Skip	Third	Second	Lead	Locale(s)
Mike Armstrong	Tyler Lang	Daniel Selke	Jordan Raymond	Nutana Curling Club, Saskatoon
Scott Bitz	Jeff Sharp	Aryn Scmhidt	Dean Hicke	Highland Curling Club, Regina
Randy Bryden	Troy Robinson	Brennen Jones	Trent Knapp	Callie Curling Club, Regina
Darren Camm	John Carlos	Mark Steckler	Anthony Sepke	Sutherland Curling Club, Saskatoon
Brent Gedak	Josh Aston	Derek Owens	Malcolm Vanstone	Estevan Curling Club, Estevan
Kody Hartung (fourth)	Jeff Hartung (skip)	Tyler Hartung	Claire Decock	Langenburg Curling Club, Langenburg
Josh Heidt	Brock Montgomery	Matthew Lang	Dustin Kidby	Kerrobert Curling Club, Kerrobert
Joel Jordison	Jason Ackerman	Brent Goeres	Curtis Horwath	Highland Curling Club, Regina
Max Kirkpatrick	Shaun Meachem	Jeff Chambers	Shawn Hiebert	Swift Current Curling Club, Swift Current
Bruce Korte	Dean Kleiter	Roger Korte	Rob Markowsky	Nutana Curling Club, Saskatoon
Steve Laycock	Kirk Muyres	Colton Flasch	Dallan Muyres	Nutana Curling Club, Saskatoon
Scott Manners	Carl deConinck Smith	Ryan Deis	Mark Larsen	North Battleford Curling Club, North Battleford
Kevin Marsh	Matt Ryback	Dan Marsh	Aaron Shutra	Nutana Curling Club, Saskatoon
Terry Marteniuk	Trevor Mackan	Ray Sharp	Aron Hershmiller	Yorkton Curling Club, Yorkton
Darrell McKee	Warren Jackson	Tony Korol	Rory Golanowski	Nutana Curling Club, Saskatoon
Brock Virtue	Braeden Moskowy	Chris Schille	D. J. Kidby	Callie Curling Club, Regina

== Knockout Draw Brackets ==
The draw is listed as follows:

=== A Event ===
First Knockout
Brock Virtue	7
Mike Armstrong	1
Josh Heidt	2
Jeff Hartung	10
Scott Manners	6
Kevin Marsh	3
Max Kirkpatrick	4
Bruce Korte	8
Scott Bitz	5
Terry Marteniuk	4
Randy Bryden	2
Joel Jordison	4
Darrell McKee	8
Brent Gedak	6
Darren Camm	3
Steve Laycock	4

Quarterfinals
Brock Virtue	3
Jeff Hartung	1
Scott Manners	5
Bruce Korte	3
Scott Bitz	6
Joel Jordison	3
Darrell McKee	3
Steve Laycock	5

Semifinals
Brock Virtue	6
Scott Manners	5
Scott Bitz	4
Steve Laycock	5

Qualifier 1
Brock Virtue	4
Steve Laycock	5

=== B Event ===
Second Knockout
Josh Heidt	6
Mike Armstrong	4
Randy Bryden	6
Terry Marteniuk	4

Quarterfinals
Bruce Korte	8
Josh Heidt	9
Randy Bryden	2
Darrell McKee	8

Semifinals
Scott Bitz	10
Josh Heidt	8
Scott Manners	3
Darrell McKee	8

To Qualifier 2
Scott Bitz	3
Darrell McKee	9
Qualifier 2
Darrell McKee	4
Brock Virtue	5

Second Knockout
Max Kirkpatrick	7
Kevin Marsh	8
Brent Gedak	4
Darren Camm	10

Quarterfinals
Kevin Marsh	7
Jeff Hartung	8
Darren Camm	6
Joel Jordison	7

Semifinals
Jeff Hartung	9
Joel Jordison	5

To Qualifier 2
Jeff Hartung	4
Brock Virtue	7

=== C Event ===
Third Knockout
Max Kirkpatrick	11
Mike Armstrong	8
Bruce Korte	7
Randy Bryden	5

Quarterfinals
Max Kirkpatrick	6
Scott Manners	4
Joel Jordison	7
Bruce Korte	5

Semifinals
Jeff Hartung	10
Max Kirkpatrick	6
Joel Jordison	3
Scott Bitz	4

Qualifier 3
Jeff Hartung	9
Scott Bitz	8

Third Knockout
Brent Gedak	7
Terry Marteniuk	6

Quarterfinals
Brent Gedak	5
Josh Heidt	4
Darren Camm	2
Kevin Marsh	8

Semifinals
Brent Gedak	7
Kevin Marsh	9

Qualifier 4
Kevin Marsh	10
Darrell McKee	7

== Playoffs ==
Page playoff system
1	Steve Laycock	6
2	Brock Virtue	8
3	Jeff Hartung	9
4	Kevin Marsh	8

Semifinal
1	Steve Laycock	8
3	Jeff Hartung	6

Final
2	Brock Virtue	6
1	Steve Laycock	7

=== 1 vs. 2 ===
Saturday, February 1, 7:00 pm

Sheet C	1	2	3	4	5	6	7	8	9	10	Final
Steve Laycock	0	0	1	3	0	0	1	0	1	0	6
Brock Virtue	0	0	0	0	2	2	0	3	0	1	8

=== 3 vs. 4 ===
Saturday, February 1, 7:00 pm

Sheet A	1	2	3	4	5	6	7	8	9	10	11	Final
Jeff Hartung	0	2	0	0	4	0	1	0	1	0	1	9
Kevin Marsh	1	0	0	2	0	3	0	1	0	1	0	8

=== Semifinal ===
Sunday, February 2, 9:30 am

Sheet C	1	2	3	4	5	6	7	8	9	10	11	Final
Steve Laycock	0	1	0	1	0	1	0	1	0	2	2	8
Jeff Hartung	0	0	2	0	1	0	1	0	2	0	0	6

=== Final ===
Sunday, February 2, 2:00 pm

Sheet C	1	2	3	4	5	6	7	8	9	10	Final
Brock Virtue	0	1	0	2	0	0	0	0	2	1	6
Steve Laycock	0	0	3	0	2	1	0	1	0	0	7

2014 SaskTel Tankard

Steve Laycock
4th Saskatchewan Provincial Championship title
