= 2019 Northwest Territories Men's Curling Championship =

- Host city: Yellowknife, Northwest Territories
- Arena: Yellowknife Curling Club
- Dates: February 7–10
- Winner: Team Koe
- Curling club: Yellowknife Curling Club
- Skip: Jamie Koe
- Third: David Aho
- Second: Matthew Ng
- Lead: Cole Parsons
- Finalist: Greg Skauge

The 2019 Northwest Territories Men's Curling Championship was played February 7–10 at the Yellowknife Curling Club in Yellowknife. The winning Jamie Koe team represented the Northwest Territories at the 2019 Tim Hortons Brier in Brandon, Manitoba, Canada's national men's curling championship.

== Teams ==
The teams are listed as follows:

Skip	Third	Second	Lead	Locale
Andrew Dunbar	D'arcy Delorey	Kyle Gee	Nick Saturnino	Inuvik
Glen Hudy	Brian Kelln	Franz Dziuba	Richard Klakowich	Yellowknife
Jamie Koe	David Aho	Matthew Ng	Cole Parsons	Yellowknife
Bruce McArthur	Sawer Kaeser	Tristan MacPherson	Nick Kaeser	Fort Smith
Shadrach Mcleod	Mark Robertson	Stephen Robertson	Robert Koehler	Yellowknife
Greg Skauge	Tom Naugler	Brad Patzer	Jim Sosiak	Yellowknife

== Round robin standings ==
Key
To playoffs

Skip	W	L
Koe	5	0
Hudy	3	2
Skauge	3	2
Mcleod	2	3
Dunbar	2	3
McArthur	0	5

== Scores ==
=== February 7 ===
Draw 1

- Dunbar 6-3 Hudy
- Mcleod 10-4 McArthur
- Koe 8-6 Skauge

=== February 8 ===
Draw 2

- Hudy 8-4 Skauge
- Koe 11-2 McArthur
- Mcleod 7-4 Dunbar

Draw 3

- Koe 11-2 Mcleod
- Skauge 6-4 Dunbar
- Hudy 9-5 McArthur

=== February 9 ===
Draw 4

- Dunbar 4-3 McArthur
- Koe 8-1 Hudy
- Skauge 12-5 Mcleod

Draw 5

- Skauge 11-2 McArthur
- Hudy 7-4 Mcleod
- Koe 12-3 Dunbar

== Playoffs ==
Semifinal			Final
			1	Jamie Koe	8
2	Glen Hudy	4	3	Greg Skauge	3
3	Greg Skauge	8

=== Semifinal ===
February 10, 9:00am

Team	1	2	3	4	5	6	7	8	9	10	Final
Glen Hudy	0	2	0	1	0	0	0	1	0	X	4
Greg Skauge	0	0	1	0	0	3	2	0	2	X	8

=== Final ===
February 10, 2:00pm

Team	1	2	3	4	5	6	7	8	9	10	Final
Jamie Koe	1	1	0	1	0	2	0	3	X	X	8
Greg Skauge	0	0	1	0	1	0	1	0	X	X	3
