= 2013 Victoria Curling Classic =

World Curling Tour event

- Host city: Victoria, British Columbia
- Arena: Archie Browning Sports Centre
- Dates: March 20–24
- Winner: (Sweden) Niklas Edin
- Curling club: Karlstads CK, Karlstad
- Skip: Niklas Edin
- Third: Sebastian Kraupp
- Second: Fredrik Lindberg
- Lead: Viktor Kjäll
- Finalist: (Manitoba) Mike McEwen

The 2013 Victoria Curling Classic was held at the Archie Browning Sports Centre in Victoria, British Columbia from March 20 to 24 as part of the 2012–13 World Curling Tour. The event was held in a triple knockout format, and the purse for the event was CAD$76,000, of which the winner, Niklas Edin, received CAD$25,000. Edin defeated Mike McEwen in the final with a score of 9–8.

== Teams ==
The teams are listed as follows:

Skip	Third	Second	Lead	Locale
Tom Brewster	David Murdoch	Greg Drummond	Scott Andrews	Aberdeen, Scotland
Brady Clark	Sean Beighton	Darren Lehto	Steve Lundeen	(Washington (state)) Seattle, Washington
Jim Cotter	Jason Gunnlaugson	Tyrel Griffith	Rick Sawatsky	Kelowna/Vernon, British Columbia
Neil Dangerfield	Dennis Sutton	Darren Boden	Glen Allen	Victoria, British Columbia
Niklas Edin	Sebastian Kraupp	Fredrik Lindberg	Viktor Kjäll	Karlstad, Sweden
John Epping	Scott Bailey	Scott Howard	David Mathers	Toronto, Ontario
Kristian Lindström (fourth)	Oskar Eriksson (skip)	Markus Eriksson	Christoffer Sundgren	Karlstad, Sweden
Rob Fowler	Allan Lyburn	Richard Daneault	Derek Samagalski	Brandon, Manitoba
Brad Gushue	Adam Casey	Brett Gallant	Geoff Walker	St. John's, Newfoundland and Labrador
Glenn Howard	Wayne Middaugh	Brent Laing	Craig Savill	Coldwater, Ontario
Naoki Iwanaga	Junpei Kanda	Shota Iino	Shotaro Hashimoto	Japan
Joel Jordison	Jesse St. John	Dane Roy	Jared St. John	Moose Jaw, Saskatchewan
Aku Kauste	Jani Sullanmaa	Pauli Jäämies	Janne Pitko	Hyvinkää, Finland
Kevin Koe	Pat Simmons	Carter Rycroft	Nolan Thiessen	Calgary, Alberta
Steve Laycock	Kirk Muyres	Colton Flasch	Dallan Muyres	Saskatoon, Saskatchewan
Kevin Martin	John Morris	Marc Kennedy	Ben Hebert	Edmonton, Alberta
Mike McEwen	B.J. Neufeld	Matt Wozniak	Denni Neufeld	Winnipeg, Manitoba
Rick McKague	Jim Moats	Doug McNish	Paul Strandlund	Edmonton, Alberta
Sven Michel	Claudio Pätz	Sandro Trolliet	Simon Gempeler	Adelboden, Switzerland
Yusuke Morozumi	Tsuyoshi Yamaguchi	Tetsuro Shimizu	Kosuke Morozumi	Karuizawa, Japan
Dan Petryk (fourth)	Steve Petryk (skip)	Roland Robinson	Thomas Usselman	Calgary, Alberta
Jeff Stoughton	Jon Mead	Reid Carruthers	Mark Nichols	Winnipeg, Manitoba
Alexey Tselousov	Alexey Stukalsky	Andrey Drozdov	Artur Razhabov	Moscow, Russia
Thomas Ulsrud	Thomas Løvold	Christoffer Svae	Håvard Vad Petersson	Oslo, Norway

== Knockout results ==
The draw is listed as follows:

=== A event ===
First Knockout		Semifinals		Qualifier 1
(Manitoba) Mike McEwen	8
(British Columbia) Neil Dangerfield	6	(Manitoba) Mike McEwen	8
(Manitoba) Rob Fowler	2	(Sweden) Oskar Eriksson	5
(Sweden) Oskar Eriksson	5			(Manitoba) Mike McEwen	5
(Sweden) Niklas Edin	7			(Sweden) Niklas Edin	7
(Japan) Yusuke Morozumi	4	(Sweden) Niklas Edin	4
(Switzerland) Sven Michel	4	(Saskatchewan) Steve Laycock	2
(Saskatchewan) Steve Laycock	6

First Knockout		Semifinals		Qualifier 2
(Newfoundland and Labrador) Brad Gushue	11
(Washington (state)) Brady Clark	2	(Newfoundland and Labrador) Brad Gushue	5
(Alberta) Kevin Martin	6	(Alberta) Kevin Martin	3
(Finland) Aku Kauste	2			(Newfoundland and Labrador) Brad Gushue	5
(Norway) Thomas Ulsrud	7			(Alberta) Kevin Koe	3
(Alberta) Steve Petryk	5	(Norway) Thomas Ulsrud	2
(Alberta) Kevin Koe	6	(Alberta) Kevin Koe	6
(Alberta) Rick McKague	3

First Knockout		Semifinals		Qualifier 3
(Manitoba) Jeff Stoughton	6
(Russia) Alexey Tselousov	5	(Manitoba) Jeff Stoughton	7
(British Columbia) Jim Cotter	1	(Scotland) Tom Brewster	3
(Scotland) Tom Brewster	5			(Manitoba) Jeff Stoughton	5
(Ontario) John Epping	5			(Ontario) Glenn Howard	6
(Saskatchewan) Joel Jordison	7	(Saskatchewan) Joel Jordison	1
(Ontario) Glenn Howard	8	(Ontario) Glenn Howard	6
(Japan) Naoki Iwanaga	1

=== B event ===
Second Knockout
(British Columbia) Neil Dangerfield	3
(Manitoba) Rob Fowler	8
(Japan) Yusuke Morozumi	2
(Switzerland) Sven Michel	7

Quarterfinals
(Scotland) Tom Brewster	5
(Manitoba) Rob Fowler	6
(Saskatchewan) Joel Jordison	4
(Switzerland) Sven Michel	5

Semifinals
(Manitoba) Rob Fowler	5
(Switzerland) Sven Michel	3

Qualifier 4
(Manitoba) Rob Fowler	3
(Alberta) Kevin Koe	0

Second Knockout
(Washington (state)) Brady Clark	9
(Finland) Aku Kauste	1
(Alberta) Steve Petryk	7
(Alberta) Rick McKague	3

Quarterfinals
(Sweden) Oskar Eriksson	5
(Washington (state)) Brady Clark	3
(Saskatchewan) Steve Laycock	5
(Alberta) Steve Petryk	8

Semifinals
(Sweden) Oskar Eriksson	2
(Alberta) Steve Petryk	5

Qualifier 5
(Alberta) Steve Petryk	4
(Manitoba) Jeff Stoughton	5

Second Knockout
(Russia) Alexey Tselousov	3
(British Columbia) Jim Cotter	6
(Ontario) John Epping	10
(Japan) Naoki Iwanaga	2

Quarterfinals
(Alberta) Kevin Martin	6
(British Columbia) Jim Cotter	1
(Norway) Thomas Ulsrud	5
(Ontario) John Epping	4

Semifinals
(Alberta) Kevin Martin	6
(Norway) Thomas Ulsrud	5

Qualifier 6
(Alberta) Kevin Martin	3
(Manitoba) Mike McEwen	7

=== C event ===
Third Knockout
(Washington (state)) Brady Clark	5
(Saskatchewan) Steve Laycock	4
(British Columbia) Jim Cotter	6
(Ontario) John Epping	11

Quarterfinals
(Scotland) Tom Brewster	6
(Saskatchewan) Joel Jordison	5
(Washington (state)) Brady Clark	4
(Norway) Thomas Ulsrud	8
(Switzerland) Sven Michel	5
(Ontario) John Epping	4

Semifinals
(Scotland) Tom Brewster	2
(Norway) Thomas Ulsrud	8
(Switzerland) Sven Michel	6
(Alberta) Steve Petryk	3

Qualifier 7
(Norway) Thomas Ulsrud	2
(Switzerland) Sven Michel	5

Third Knockout
(British Columbia) Neil Dangerfield	3
(Japan) Yusuke Morozumi	10
(Finland) Aku Kauste	7
(Alberta) Rick McKague	4
(Russia) Alexey Tselousov	9
(Japan) Naoki Iwanaga	1

Quarterfinals
(Japan) Yusuke Morozumi	5
(Sweden) Oskar Eriksson	6
(Finland) Aku Kauste	6
(Russia) Alexey Tselousov	5

Semifinals
(Alberta) Kevin Martin	4
(Sweden) Oskar Eriksson	3
(Alberta) Kevin Koe	5
(Finland) Aku Kauste	1

Qualifier 8
(Alberta) Kevin Martin	8
(Alberta) Kevin Koe	3

== Playoffs ==
Quarterfinals
(Sweden) Niklas Edin	7
(Alberta) Kevin Martin	5
(Manitoba) Rob Fowler	3
(Manitoba) Jeff Stoughton	5
(Newfoundland and Labrador) Brad Gushue	6
(Switzerland) Sven Michel	4
(Ontario) Glenn Howard	1
(Manitoba) Mike McEwen	6

Semifinals
(Sweden) Niklas Edin	6
(Manitoba) Jeff Stoughton	1
(Newfoundland and Labrador) Brad Gushue	3
(Manitoba) Mike McEwen	4

Final
(Sweden) Niklas Edin	9
(Manitoba) Mike McEwen	8
