= Dean Ross =

Canadian curler (born c. 1963)

Dean Ross (born c. 1963) is a Canadian curler from Calgary, Alberta. He was the first man to represent Canada at the World Mixed Doubles Curling Championships.

In 2007, Ross and teammates Susan O'Connor, Tim Krassman and Susan Wright represented Alberta at the 2008 Canadian Mixed Curling Championship. After finishing the round robin with a 10–1 record, the Calgary-based rink defeated Ontario's Bob Turcotte to win the Canadian Mixed Curling Championship.

After some speculation as to who would represent Canada at the inaugural 2008 World Mixed Doubles Curling Championship, the Canadian Curling Association selected Ross and O'Connor to represent the country. Ross and O'Connor finished with a 5–2 record in their group, but lost to Finland in their second semi-final challenge game, and did not win a medal.

Ross also skips a men's team on the World Curling Tour. In 2010, he won his first event, the World Financial Group Classic.

Ross is employed as a course superintendent at the Collicutt Siding Golf Course.

== Teammates ==
- Don DeLair (third)
- Chris Blackwell (second)
- Steve Jensen (lead)
