= Akira Takeda =

Japanese literary scholar (1930–2021)

Akira Takeda (竹田 晃, November 26, 1930 – August 6, 2021) was a Japanese scholar of Chinese literature. He served as a professor at the College of Arts and Sciences at the University of Tokyo and later held the titles of professor emeritus at both the University of Tokyo and Meikai University. His specialties were zhiguai tales from the Six Dynasties period and chuanqi tales from the Tang dynasty. He also served as the manager of the University of Tokyo Baseball Club.

== Biography ==
Akira Takeda was born in Tokyo in 1930. In 1943, he graduated from the Elementary School affiliated with Tokyo Higher Normal School (now Elementary School, University of Tsukuba), and then entered the affiliated middle school (now the Junior and Senior High School at Otsuka, University of Tsukuba). While in school, he was a member of the baseball team and, in his fourth year, participated in the summer Koshien tournament as a second baseman. He was among the players credited with starting the tradition of taking home soil from the Koshien field.

In 1948, while in his fifth year of middle school, he failed to pass the entrance exam for the prestigious First Higher School. Due to postwar educational reforms, he became a third-year student at the Tokyo Higher Normal School-affiliated high school. In the spring of 1949, he entered the University of Tokyo. There, he joined the baseball team and, during his undergraduate years, served as the team captain, actively participating in the Tokyo Big6 Baseball League. After entering graduate school, he worked as an assistant coach and later as manager. Upon advancing to the doctoral program, his academic advisor, Takejiro Kuraishi, instructed him to resign from the baseball team to focus solely on research. He then stepped down from his coaching role.

In 1953, he graduated from the Faculty of Letters at the University of Tokyo with a degree in Chinese literature. In 1959, after completing the coursework for the doctoral program in Chinese language and literature, he withdrew without earning a doctorate.

After graduation, he worked as a part-time lecturer at high schools. In 1961, he was appointed as an assistant at the University of Tokyo's Faculty of Letters. From 1965 onward, he held positions as lecturer, associate professor, and professor at the College of Arts and Sciences. He also served as a university councilor and dean of the college. In 1991, he retired upon reaching the mandatory retirement age and became professor emeritus. He later taught at Tokyo Woman's Christian University and then at Meikai University, where he was also awarded the title of professor emeritus upon retirement.

== Family ==
Father: Sakae Takeda (竹田復) was also a scholar of Chinese literature and a professor emeritus at Tokyo University of Education. Brother: Hiroshi Takeda (竹田宏) was formerly a professor at Daito Bunka University.
