= Stephen Burgess =

British statistician and epidemiologist

- Alma mater: University of Cambridge (BA, MMath, PhD)
- Known for: Mendelian randomization, causal inference
- Awards: Clarivate Highly Cited Researcher (2019–2025)
- Scientific career
- Fields: Statistics, Epidemiology
- Workplaces: MRC Biostatistics Unit, University of Cambridge
- Doctoral advisor: Simon G. Thompson

Stephen Burgess is a British statistician and genetic epidemiologist. He is a Research Professor at the University of Cambridge and a Programme Leader at the MRC Biostatistics Unit. His primary area of research is the development of statistical methods for Mendelian randomization and causal inference using genetic data.

Burgess attended studied mathematics at Emmanuel College, Cambridge where he studied mathematics and received a Bachelor of Arts degree in 2005. He also obtained a Master of Mathematics degree in 2006. He received his PhD from the University of Cambridge's MRC Biostatistics Unit in 2012. His doctoral research examined the use of genetic instrumental variables in Mendelian randomization analyses.

After completing his doctorate, Burgess joined the Cardiovascular Epidemiology Unit in the University of Cambridge's Department of Public Health and Primary Care. In 2013, he received a Sir Henry Wellcome Postdoctoral Fellowship. In 2017, he was appointed Programme Leader Track at the MRC Biostatistics Unit. He became a Programme Leader in 2022 and a Research Professor in 2025. He still maintains an affiliation with the Cardiovascular Epidemiology Unit and has been a fellow at Homerton College, Cambridge since 2014.

Burgess is Director of Statistics at Sequoia Genetics. He has served as an associate editor of the International Journal of Epidemiology and previously served as an associate editor of the American Journal of Human Genetics. He is a member of the steering committee of the European Causal Inference Meeting.

== Bibliography ==
=== Books ===
- Burgess, S.; Thompson, S.G. (2015). Mendelian Randomization: Methods for Using Genetic Variants in Causal Estimation. Chapman & Hall/CRC.
- Burgess, S.; Thompson, S.G. (2021). Mendelian Randomization: Methods for Causal Inference Using Genetic Variants. Chapman & Hall/CRC.

=== Selected publications ===
- Burgess, S.; Butterworth, A.; Thompson, S. G. (2013). "Mendelian randomization analysis with multiple genetic variants using summarized data". Genetic Epidemiology. 37 (7): 658–665. doi:10.1002/gepi.21758. PMC 4377079. PMID 24114802.
- Bowden, J.; Davey Smith, G.; Burgess, S. (2015). "Mendelian randomization with invalid instruments: effect estimation and bias detection through Egger regression". International Journal of Epidemiology. 44 (2): 512–525. doi:10.1093/ije/dyv080. PMC 4469799. PMID 26050253.
- Bowden, J.; Davey Smith, G.; Haycock, P. C.; Burgess, S. (2016). "Consistent estimation in Mendelian randomization with some invalid instruments using a weighted median estimator". Genetic Epidemiology. 40 (4): 304–314. doi:10.1002/gepi.21965. PMC 4849733. PMID 27061298.
- Burgess, S.; Davey Smith, G.; Davies, N.; et al. (2020). "Guidelines for performing Mendelian randomization investigations". Wellcome Open Research. 4: 186. doi:10.12688/wellcomeopenres.15555.3. PMC 7384151. PMID 32760811.
- Burgess, S.; Ference, B.; Staley, J.; et al. (2018). "Association of LPA variants with risk of coronary disease and the implications for lipoprotein(a)-lowering therapies: a Mendelian randomization analysis". JAMA Cardiology. 3 (7): 619–627. doi:10.1001/jamacardio.2018.1470. PMC 6481553. PMID 29926099.
