= J. D. Lind =

Canadian curler and coach

Personal information
- Full name: James Douglas Lind
- Nickname: JD
- Born: February 19, 1985 (age 40); Calgary, Alberta, Canada
- Education: University of Calgary
- Occupation: Professional curling coach
- Employer: Japan Curling Association
- Spouse: (m. 2016)
- Website: Coach Profile - 2018 Olympics

Sport
- Country: Canada (player, coach); Japan (national coach)
- Sport: Curling
- Position: Skip, Third, Coach
- Now coaching: Japanese national team

Achievements and titles
- Olympic finals: Coach: 2014 Women's curling Coach: 2018 Men's curling Coach: 2018 Women's curling

James Douglas Lind (born February 19, 1985) is a Canadian curler and coach. He led three different Japanese curling club teams at Olympic Games in 2014 Sochi and in 2018 PyeongChang as the national coach, and brought five bronze medals to Japanese women's team in 2018.

== Career ==
=== As a player ===
Lind started his career as a curler at junior teams. He is the runner up skip position at Twin Anchors Houseboats Vacations / Prestige Inn Classic in 2004. He is the winner of 2011 World Financial Group Classic as the third position of Team Virtue. In 2012, he got silver medals at Boston Pizza Cup as the third of Team Virtue and at HDF Insurance Shoot-Out as the third of Team Thomas.

=== As a coach ===
He started the career as a coach for Team Thomas at Canadian Junior Curling Championships in 2007. From 2013 to 2016, he worked as the head coach of three years course; Hokkaido Women's Curling Academy in Sapporo. Since 2013, he has been working as the national coach for the Japan Curling Association.

At the games of curling at the 2014 Winter Olympics – Women's tournament, he led Japanese women's team Hokkaido Bank Fortius CC, in Sapporo City, Hokkaido Island, which resulted 4th in round robin standing.

At the games of curling at the 2018 Winter Olympics – Women's tournament, he led Japanese women's team Loco Solare; Tokoro Curling Team, in Tokoro Town, Kitami City, Hokkaido Island to bronze medal. He also coached Japanese men's team SC Karuizawa Club, in Karuizawa Town, Nagano Prefecture at the games of curling at the 2018 Winter Olympics – Men's tournament, which resulted 8th final standing.

== Personal life ==
Lind is married and has one son. He is an inductee to the Southern Alberta Curling Hall of Fame.
