= Brock Virtue =

Canadian curler (born 1986)

- Curler
- Born: September 21, 1986 (age 40); Lethbridge, Alberta, Canada

Team
- Curling club: Kerrobert CC, Kerrobert, SK
- Skip: Charley Thomas
- Third: Brock Virtue
- Second: J. D. Lind
- Lead: Matt Ng

Curling career
- Member Association: Alberta (2003–2011; 2020–present); Saskatchewan (2012–2019)
- Brier: 1 (2013)
- Top CTRS ranking: 12th (2013–14)
Medal record
Men's Curling
Representing Canada
World Junior Curling Championships
Gold medal – first place	2007 Eveleth

Brock Virtue (born September 21, 1986) is a Canadian curler. He currently plays third on Team Charley Thomas. He is a former Canadian and World Junior Curling Champion.

Born in Lethbridge, Alberta, raised in from Regina, Saskatchewan, Virtue's junior career involved winning two provincial junior championships, a Canadian championship and a World championship. He played in his first Canadian Junior Curling Championships in 2003 playing third for Darren Moulding. The team finished the round robin with an 8-4 record, tied with British Columbia. They beat B.C. in a tie-breaker, then they beat Quebec in the semi-final before losing to Saskatchewan's Steve Laycock in the final at the Rideau Curling Club in Ottawa. Virtue did not return to the Canadian Juniors until 2007, playing third for Charley Thomas. That team finished the round robin of the 2007 Canadian Junior Curling Championships with an 11-1 record, in first place. The team would go on to beat Prince Edward Island's Brett Gallant in the final. This qualified them to represent Canada at the 2007 World Junior Curling Championships. They finished the round robin portion of the worlds in 1st place, with an 8-1 record. They would go on to win their semi-final match against Denmark and their final game against Sweden's Niklas Edin to win the gold medal.

Following his junior career, Virtue teamed up with Moulding again as his third from 2007 to 2009. He then joined the Steve Petryk rink for one season before forming his own rink in 2010. In 2011, Virtue would play in his first provincial championship, where his rink would lose in the C1 vs. C2 page playoff game against Kevin Koe. Later that season, Virtue would play in his first Grand Slam event, the 2011 Players' Championship. However, the rink would lose all three of their games. In 2012, his team would play in its second provincial championship, where they made it all the way to the final before losing to Koe once again.

In 2012, Virtue moved to Regina, Saskatchewan and formed a new team of Braeden Moskowy, Chris Schille and D. J. Kidby. The team played in one Grand Slam event during the 2012-13 season, the 2012 Rogers Masters, where they went 2-3. Later in the season, the team would play in their first Saskatchewan provincial championship. The team won the event, and represented Saskatchewan at the 2013 Tim Hortons Brier in Edmonton where they finished with a 5-6 record.

The following season, the rink would make it to the finals of the 2014 SaskTel Tankard provincial championship, where they lost to Steve Laycock. They played in another Grand Slam event, the 2014 Syncrude National, where they were win-less.

== Grand Slam record ==
Key
C	Champion
F	Lost in Final
SF	Lost in Semifinal
QF	Lost in Quarterfinals
R16	Lost in the round of 16
Q	Did not advance to playoffs
T2	Played in Tier 2 event
DNP	Did not participate in event
N/A	Not a Grand Slam event that season

Event	2010–11	2011–12	2012–13	2013–14
Masters	DNP	DNP	Q	DNP
Canadian Open	DNP	DNP	DNP	DNP
The National	DNP	DNP	DNP	Q
Players'	Q	DNP	DNP	
