= Tatsiana Tarsunova =

Belarusian female curler

- Curler
- Born: 23 July 1967 (age 59); Minsk, Belarus

Team
- Mixed doubles partner: Ilya Shalamitski

Curling career
- World Mixed Doubles Championship: 2 (2018, 2019)
- Other appearances: World Mixed Championship: 1 (2018)
Medal record
Curling
Representing Belarus

Tatsiana Tarsunova (Belarusian: Тацья́на Тарсуно́ва, Russian: Татья́на Торсуно́ва; born 23 July 1967 in Minsk) is a Belarusian female curler. She is right-handed.

== Achievements ==
- Belarusian Mixed Curling Championship: gold (2018).
- Belarusian Mixed Doubles Curling Championship: gold (2019), silver (2018).

== Teams and events ==
=== Women's ===
Season	Skip	Third	Second	Lead
2017–18	Irina Belko	Polina Petrova	Tatsiana Tarsunova	Vera Tarsunova

=== Mixed ===
Season	Skip	Third	Second	Lead	Coach	Events
2016–17	Ilya Shalamitski	Ekaterina Kirillova	Dzmitry Rudnitski	Tatsiana Tarsunova		BMxCC 2017 (4th)
2017–18	Ilya Shalamitski	Susanna Ivashyna	Yevgeny Tamkovich	Tatsiana Tarsunova		BMxCC 2018 (gold)
2018–19	Ilya Shalamitski (fourth)	Susanna Ivashyna (skip)	Yevgeny Tamkovich	Tatsiana Tarsunova	Anton Batugin	WMxCC 2018 (14th)
2018–19	Ilya Shalamitski	Tatsiana Tarsunova	Yevgeny Tamkovich	Aryna Sviarzhynskaya		BMxCC 2019 (4th)

=== Mixed doubles ===
Season	Male	Female	Coach	Events
2017–18	Ilya Shalamitski	Tatsiana Tarsunova	Yevgeny Tamkovich (WMDCC)	BMDCC 2018 (silver); WMDCC 2018 (21st)
2018–19	Ilya Shalamitski	Tatsiana Tarsunova	Vasily Telezhkin (WMDCC)	BMDCC 2019 (gold); WMDCC 2019 (28th)
