= Ilya Shalamitski =

Belarusian male curler, professional tennis player and tennis coach

- Curler
- Born: 12 November 1984 (age 42); Minsk, Belarus

Team
- Skip: Ilya Shalamitski
- Third: Pavel Petrov
- Second: Dzmitry Rudnitski
- Lead: Yevgeny Tamkovich
- Alternate: Aliaksei Smotrin
- Mixed doubles partner: Tatsiana Tarsunova

Curling career
- World Mixed Doubles Championship: 3 (2017, 2018, 2019)
- European Championship: 3 (2016, 2018, 2019)
- Other appearances: World Mixed Championship: 1 (2018)
Medal record
Curling
Representing Belarus

Ilya Shalamitski (Belarusian: Илья́ Шалами́цкий, Russian: Илья́ Шоломи́цкий; born 12 November 1984 in Minsk) is a Belarusian male curler, professional tennis player and tennis coach. He is left-handed.

== Achievements ==
- Belarusian Mixed Doubles Curling Championship: gold (2016, 2019), silver (2018).

== Teams and events ==
=== Men's ===
Season	Skip	Third	Second	Lead	Alternate	Coach	Events
2002–03	Ilya Shalamitski	Kostya Balakin	Viktar Hilitski	Aleksey Kapitsa			WJCC-B 2003 (11th)
2003–04	Ilya Shalamitski	Kostya Balakin	Viktar Hilitski	Aleksey Kapitsa	Yury Bylina		WJCC-B 2004 (9th)
2004–05	Ilya Shalamitski	Kanstantsin Balakin	Anton Boda	Yury Bylina	Viktar Hilitski	Yuri Kochubey	EJCC 2005 (8th)
2015–16	Ilya Shalamitski	Kanstantsin Balakin	Aliaksei Smotrin	Aliaksandr Tsiushkevich	Viktar Hilitski		ECC-C 2016 (6th)
2017–18	Ilya Shalamitski (fourth)	Pavel Petrov (skip)	Dzmitry Rudnitski	Yevgeny Tamkovich	Aliaksei Smotrin	Vasily Telezhkin	BMCC 2018 (silver); ECC-C 2018 (silver)
2018–19	Ilya Shalamitski	Pavel Petrov	Dzmitry Rudnitski	Yevgeny Tamkovich	Aliaksei Smotrin	Vasily Telezhkin	ECC 2018 (15th)

=== Mixed ===
Season	Skip	Third	Second	Lead	Coach	Events
2015–16	Dmitry Yarko	Susanna Ivashyna	Ilya Shalamitski	Vera Dosava		BMxCC 2016 (7th)
2016–17	Ilya Shalamitski	Ekaterina Kirillova	Dzmitry Rudnitski	Tatsiana Tarsunova		BMxCC 2017 (4th)
2017–18	Ilya Shalamitski	Susanna Ivashyna	Yevgeny Tamkovich	Tatsiana Tarsunova		BMxCC 2018 (gold)
2018–19	Ilya Shalamitski (fourth)	Susanna Ivashyna (skip)	Yevgeny Tamkovich	Tatsiana Tarsunova	Anton Batugin	WMxCC 2018 (14th)
2018–19	Ilya Shalamitski	Tatsiana Tarsunova	Yevgeny Tamkovich	Aryna Sviarzhynskaya		BMxCC 2019 (4th)

=== Mixed doubles ===
Season	Male	Female	Coach	Events
2016–17	Ilya Shalamitski	Ekaterina Kirillova	Anton Batugin (WMDCC)	BMDCC 2016 (gold); WMDCC 2017 (22nd)
2017–18	Ilya Shalamitski	Tatsiana Tarsunova	Yevgeny Tamkovich (WMDCC)	BMDCC 2018 (silver); WMDCC 2018 (21st)
2018–19	Ilya Shalamitski	Tatsiana Tarsunova	Vasily Telezhkin (WMDCC)	BMDCC 2019 (gold); WMDCC 2019 (28th)
