= 2019 Belarusian Mixed Doubles Curling Championship =

- Host city: Minsk, Belarus
- Arena: Minsk-Arena
- Dates: December 12–16, 2018
- Winner: Ilya Shalamitski & Tatsiana Tarsunova
- Finalist: Mikalai Kryshtopa & Polina Petrova

The 2019 Belarusian Mixed Doubles Curling Championship was held from December 12 to 16, 2018 at the Minsk-Arena in Minsk, Belarus. The winners of this championship represented Belarus at the 2019 World Mixed Doubles Curling Championship.

== Teams ==
The teams are listed as follows:

	Team	Male	Female
Group A
A1	Kryshtopa / Petrova	Mikalai Kryshtopa	Polina Petrova
A2	Klevets / Belko	Yauheni Klevets	Irina Belko
A3	Barkan / Ivashyna	Dmitriy Barkan	Susanna Ivashyna
A4	Smotrin / Dziashuk	Aliaksei Smotrin	Marharyta Dziashuk
A5	Lagutik / Bogatova	Sergey Lagitik	Daria Bogatova
A6	Demeschenko / Sviarzhynskaya	Aleksander Demeschenko	Aryna Sviarzhynskaya
Group B
B1	Rudnitski / Rudnitskaya	Dmitry Rudnitski	Natalia Rudnitskaya
B2	Burmistrov / Pavlyuchik	Vitaly Burmistrov	Alina Pavlyuchik
B3	Shalamitski / Tarsunova	Ilya Shalamitski	Tatsiana Tarsunova
B4	Stoyan / Philipenko	Maxim Stoyan	Tatiana Philipenko
B5	Pauliuchyk / Pauliuchyk	Yury Pauliuchyk	Inessa Pauliuchyk
B6	Terekhov / Chechet	Kyrill Terekhov	Ekaterina Chechet

== Round Robin ==
Key
Team to Semifinals

=== Group A ===
	Team	A1	A2	A3	A4	A5	A6	W	L	LSD, cm	Place
A1	Kryshtopa / Petrova	*	4:3	8:3	2:7	5:6	9:2	3	2	1026,7	2
A2	Klevets / Belko	3:4	*	4:11	10:6	7:2	3:9	2	3	1005,0	5
A3	Barkan / Ivashyna	3:8	11:4	*	7:8	8:7	7:4	3	2	1055,1	3
A4	Smotrin / Dziashuk	7:2	6:10	8:7	*	6:4	5:7	3	2	935,5	1
A5	Lagutik / Bogatova	6:5	2:7	7:8	4:6	*	1:9	1	4	1190,0	6
A6	Demeschenko / Sviarzhynskaya	2:9	9:3	4:7	7:5	9:1	*	3	2	1608,9	4

=== Group B ===
	Team	B1	B2	B3	B4	B5	B6	W	L	LSD, cm	Place
B1	Rudnitski / Rudnitskaya	*	4:9	5:6	9:2	9:8	12:2	3	2	1092,3	3
B2	Burmistrov / Pavlyuchik	9:4	*	7:6	7:2	7:4	5:1	5	0	859,5	1
B3	Shalamitski / Tarsunova	6:5	6:7	*	7:3	7:1	14:1	4	1	882,6	2
B4	Stoyan / Philipenko	2:9	2:7	3:7	*	1:11	7:6	1	4	1352,5	6
B5	Pauliuchyk / Pauliuchyk	8:9	4:7	1:7	11:1	*	5:7	1	4	1016,4	5
B6	Terekhov / Chechet	2:12	1:5	1:14	6:7	7:5	*	1	4	829,2	4

== Playoffs ==
Semifinals
A-1	Smotrin / Dziashuk	3
B-2	Shalamitski / Tarsunova	7
B-1	Burmistrov / Pavlyuchik	3
A-2	Kryshtopa / Petrova	5

Gold medal game
Shalamitski / Tarsunova	8
Kryshtopa / Petrova	2
Bronze medal game
Smotrin / Dziashuk	8
Burmistrov / Pavlyuchik	7

== Final standings ==
Place	Team	Games	Wins	Losses	LSD, cm
1st place, gold medalist(s)	Ilya Shalamitski / Tatsiana Tarsunova	7	6	1	
2nd place, silver medalist(s)	Mikalai Kryshtopa / Polina Petrova	7	4	3	
3rd place, bronze medalist(s)	Aliaksei Smotrin / Marharyta Dziashuk	7	4	3	
4	Vitaly Burmistrov / Alina Pavlyuchik	7	5	2	
5	Dmitriy Barkan / Susanna Ivashyna	5	3	2	1055,1
6	Dmitry Rudnitski / Natalia Rudnitskaya	5	3	2	1092,3
7	Kyrill Terekhov / Ekaterina Chechet	5	1	4	829,2
8	Aleksander Demeschenko / Aryna Sviarzhynskaya	5	3	2	1608,9
9	Yauheni Klevets / Irina Belko	5	2	3	1005,0
10	Yury Pauliuchyk / Inessa Pauliuchyk	5	1	4	1016,4
11	Sergey Lagitik / Daria Bogatova	5	1	4	1190,0
12	Maxim Stoyan / Tatiana Philipenko	5	1	4	1352,5
