= Pavel Petrov (curler) =

Belarusian male curler

- Curler
- Born: Minsk, Belarus

Team
- Skip: Ilya Shalamitski
- Third: Pavel Petrov
- Second: Dzmitry Rudnitski
- Lead: Yevgeny Tamkovich
- Alternate: Aliaksei Smotrin

Curling career
- World Mixed Doubles Championship: 1 (2016)
- European Championship: 10 (2007, 2009, 2010, 2012, 2013, 2014, 2015, 2017, 2018, 2019)
- Other appearances: World Mixed Championship: 2 (2015, 2017)
Medal record
Curling
Representing Belarus

Pavel Petrov (Belarusian: Па́вел Пятро́в, Russian: Па́вел Петро́в; born in Minsk) is a Belarusian male curler.

He played on two World Mixed Championships (2015, 2017), one World Mixed Doubles Championship (2016) and nine European Championships.

== Achievements ==
- Belarusian Men's Curling Championship: silver (2018).
- Belarusian Mixed Curling Championship: gold (2017), bronze (2016, 2018).
- Belarusian Mixed Doubles Curling Championship: gold (2015).

== Teams and events ==
=== Men's ===
Season	Skip	Third	Second	Lead	Alternate	Coach	Events
2007–08	Oleksii Voloshenko	Siarhei Sarokin	Alexandr Radaev	Aliaksandr Tsiushkevich	Pavel Petrov		ECC 2007 (26th)
2009–10	Dmitry Kirillov	Pavel Petrov	Dmitry Yarko	Ilya Kazlouski			ECC-C 2010 (silver)
2010–11	Dmitry Kirillov	Dmitry Yarko	Pavel Petrov	Igor Mishenev		Ekaterina Kirillova	ECC 2010 (22nd)
2011–12	Dmitry Kirillov	Pavel Petrov	Dmitry Yarko	Andrey Aulasenka	George Kirillov		ECC-C 2012 (4th)
2012–13	Dmitry Kirillov	Pavel Petrov	Yury Pauliuchyk	Andrey Aulasenka	Ihar Platonov	Artis Zentelis	ECC-C 2013 (5th)
2013–14	Dmitry Kirillov	Pavel Petrov	Ilya Kazlouski	Andrey Aulasenka	Oleksii Voloshenko	Ekaterina Kirillova	ECC-C 2014 (5th)
2014–15	Pavel Petrov	Dmitriy Barkan	Andrei Yurkevich	Mikalai Kryshtopa	Ilya Kazlouski	Ilya Kazlouski	ECC-C 2015 (6th)
2016–17	Dmitriy Barkan	Pavel Petrov	Andrei Yurkevich	Mikalai Kryshtopa	Yauheni Klevets		ECC-C 2017 (4th)
2017–18	Ilya Shalamitski (fourth)	Pavel Petrov (skip)	Dzmitry Rudnitski	Yevgeny Tamkovich	Aliaksei Smotrin	Vasily Telezhkin	BMCC 2018 (silver); ECC-C 2018 (silver)
2018–19	Ilya Shalamitski	Pavel Petrov	Dzmitry Rudnitski	Yevgeny Tamkovich	Aliaksei Smotrin	Vasily Telezhkin	ECC 2018 (15th)

=== Mixed ===
Season	Skip	Third	Second	Lead	Events
2015–16	Pavel Petrov	Ekaterina Kirillova	Dmitry Kirillov	Polina Petrova	WMxCC 2015 (31st)
2015–16	Pavel Petrov	Polina Petrova	Dmitry Rudnitski	Natalia Rudnitskaya	BMxCC 2016 (bronze)
2016–17	Pavel Petrov	Polina Petrova	Mikalai Kryshtopa	Ewgeniya Orlis	BMxCC 2017 (gold)
2017–18	Pavel Petrov	Polina Petrova	Mikalai Kryshtopa	Ewgeniya Orlis	WMxCC 2017 (18th)
2017–18	Pavel Petrov	Polina Petrova	Mikalai Kryshtopa	Ewgeniya Orlis	BMxCC 2018 (bronze)

=== Mixed doubles ===
Season	Male	Female	Coach	Events
2015–16	Pavel Petrov	Polina Petrova	Aleksandr Orlov	BMDCC 2015 (gold); WMDCC 2016 (26th)
2016–17	Pavel Petrov	Polina Petrova		BMDCC 2016 (4th)
