= 2015 World Mixed Doubles Curling Championship =

- Host city: Sochi, Russia
- Arena: Ice Cube Curling Center
- Dates: April 18–25, 2015
- Winner: Hungary
- Female: Dorottya Palancsa
- Male: Zsolt Kiss
- Coach: Zoltan Palancsa
- Finalist: Sweden

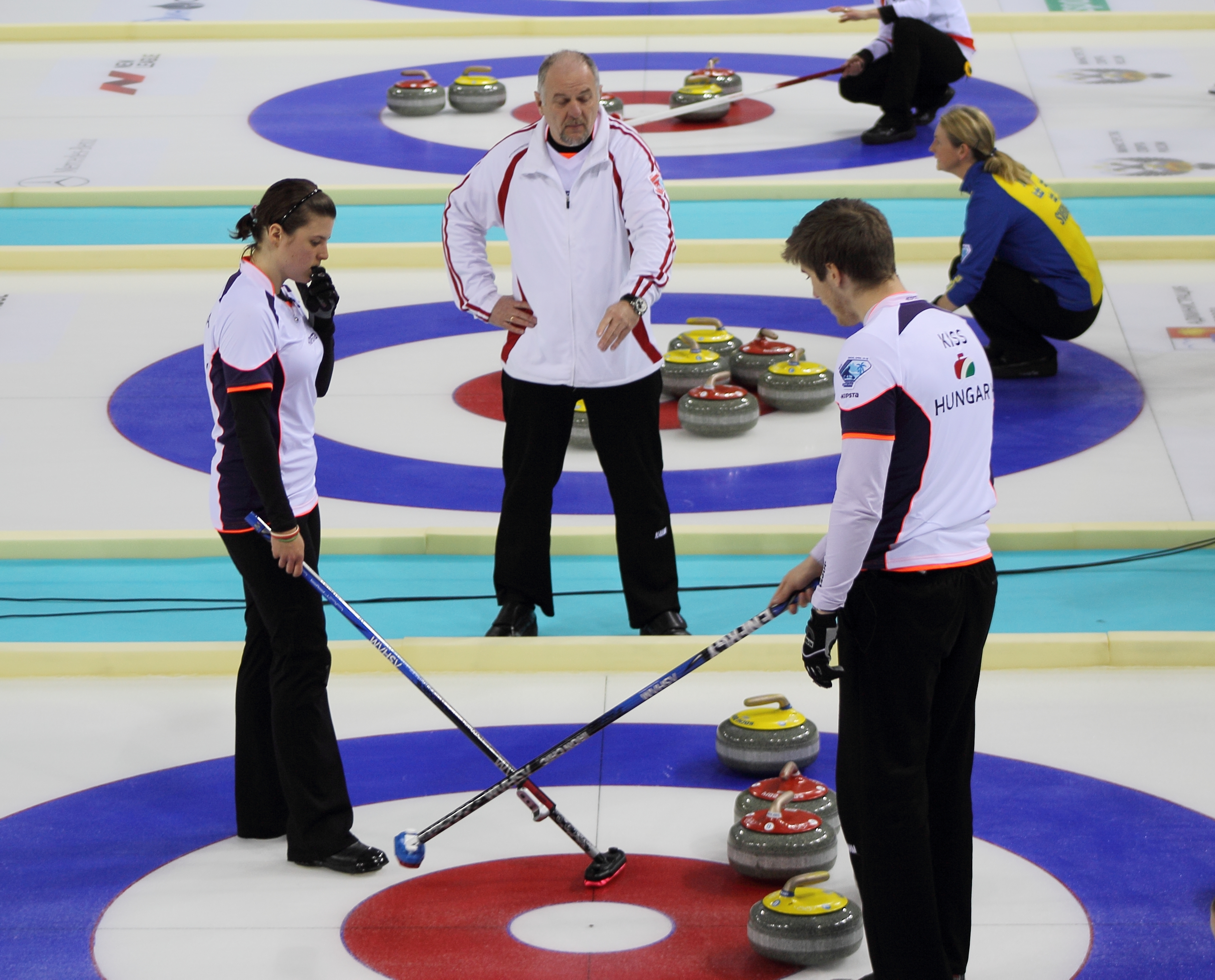
Dorottya Palancsa and Zsolt Kiss of Hungary

The 2015 World Mixed Doubles Curling Championship was held from April 18 to 25 at the Ice Cube Curling Center in Sochi, Russia. The event will be held in conjunction with the 2015 World Senior Curling Championships.

== Teams ==
The teams are listed as follows:

=== Group A ===
Australia	Czech Republic	Denmark	France	Japan
Female: Kim Forge; Male: Steve Johns	Female: Jana Jelínková; Male: Ondřej Mihola	Female: Denise Dupont; Male: Oliver Dupont	Female: Catherine Emberger; Male: Thierry Mercier	Female: Michiko Tomabechi; Male: Kenji Tomabechi
Russia	Slovakia	Switzerland	Turkey	United States
Female: Victoria Moiseeva; Male: Petr Dron	Female: Silvia Sykora; Male: Marek Sykora	Female: Carole Howald; Male: Marc Pfister	Female: Öznur Polat; Male: Kadir Çakır	Female: Sarah Anderson; Male: Korey Dropkin

=== Group B ===
Austria	Brazil	China	Finland	Italy
Female: Anna Weghuber; Male: Markus Schagerl	Female: Aline Lima; Male: Marcelo Mello	Female: Mei Jie; Male: Huang Jihui	Female: Katja Kiiskinen; Male: Kalle Kiiskinen	Female: Lucrezia Salvai; Male: Simone Gonin
Latvia	New Zealand	Norway	Slovenia	Sweden
Female: Iluta Linde; Male: Arnis Veidemanis	Female: Marisa Jones; Male: Dan Mustapic	Female: Kristin Skaslien; Male: Magnus Nedregotten	Female: Valentina Jurinčič; Male: Jure Čulić	Female: Camilla Johansson; Male: Per Noréen

=== Group C ===
Belarus	Canada	England	Estonia	Hungary
Female: Ekaterina Kirillova; Male: Dmitry Kirillov	Female: Kalynn Park; Male: Charley Thomas	Female: Lana Watson; Male: Alan MacDougall	Female: Maile Mölder; Male: Erkki Lill	Female: Dorottya Palancsa; Male: Zsolt Kiss
South Korea	Poland	Romania	Scotland	Spain
Female: Lee Hye-in; Male: Baek Jong-chul	Female: Karolina Florek; Male: Szymon Molski	Female: Iulia Traila; Male: Cristian Matau	Female: Judith McCleary; Male: Lee McCleary	Female: Irantzu García Vez; Male: Gontzal García Vez

== Round-robin standings ==
Key
Teams to Playoffs
Teams to Tie-breaker

Final round-robin standings

Group A	W	L
Russia	9	0
United States	7	2
Denmark	6	3
Japan	6	3
Switzerland	5	4
Czech Republic	4	5
Turkey	3	6
France	3	6
Slovakia	2	7
Australia	0	9

Final round-robin standings

Group B	W	L
Norway	9	0
Sweden	6	3
Italy	6	3
Latvia	6	3
Finland	6	3
China	5	4
Austria	2	7
New Zealand	2	7
Slovenia	2	7
Brazil	1	8

Final round-robin standings

Group C	W	L
Canada	8	1
Estonia	7	2
Hungary	7	2
South Korea	5	4
England	5	4
Spain	5	4
Scotland	5	4
Poland	2	7
Romania	1	8
Belarus	0	9

== Round-robin results ==
=== Group A ===
==== Saturday, April 18 ====
Draw 1 9:00

Sheet A	1	2	3	4	5	6	7	8	Final
Australia	0	0	2	2	0	1	1	0	6
Turkey	2	1	0	0	2	0	0	2	7

Sheet B	1	2	3	4	5	6	7	8	Final
Czech Republic	2	0	0	2	0	1	1	0	6
Japan	0	2	1	0	1	0	0	4	8

Sheet C	1	2	3	4	5	6	7	8	Final
Russia	1	1	0	1	1	2	4	X	10
France	0	0	1	0	0	0	0	X	1

Sheet D	1	2	3	4	5	6	7	8	Final
United States	2	0	0	1	0	2	2	X	7
Slovakia	0	1	1	0	1	0	0	X	3

Sheet E	1	2	3	4	5	6	7	8	Final
Denmark	2	1	1	3	0	1	0	X	8
Switzerland	0	0	0	0	3	0	1	X	4

==== Sunday, April 19 ====
Draw 2 11:15

Sheet A	1	2	3	4	5	6	7	8	Final
Japan	0	1	0	0	0	3	1	0	5
United States	2	0	1	1	1	0	0	3	8

Sheet B	1	2	3	4	5	6	7	8	9	Final
Turkey	0	4	0	0	1	0	3	2	0	10
Slovakia	4	0	1	1	0	4	0	0	1	11

Sheet C	1	2	3	4	5	6	7	8	Final
Denmark	1	0	4	1	1	0	1	X	8
Australia	0	1	0	0	0	1	0	X	2

Sheet D	1	2	3	4	5	6	7	8	Final
Switzerland	3	1	1	0	1	0	3	X	9
France	0	0	0	3	0	1	0	X	4

Sheet E	1	2	3	4	5	6	7	8	Final
Czech Republic	0	0	2	0	0	1	0	X	3
Russia	3	3	0	2	1	0	2	X	11

Draw 3 21:00

Sheet A	1	2	3	4	5	6	7	8	Final
France	0	1	0	0	1	1	0	X	3
Czech Republic	2	0	3	1	0	0	1	X	7

Sheet B	1	2	3	4	5	6	7	8	Final
Australia	0	2	1	0	2	0	1	X	6
Switzerland	6	0	0	1	0	1	0	X	8

Sheet C	1	2	3	4	5	6	7	8	Final
Turkey	0	0	0	0	1	0	1	X	2
United States	1	1	1	1	0	2	0	X	6

Sheet D	1	2	3	4	5	6	7	8	9	Final
Russia	1	0	2	0	0	0	2	1	1	7
Denmark	0	3	0	1	1	1	0	0	0	6

Sheet E	1	2	3	4	5	6	7	8	Final
Japan	1	2	0	3	3	3	X	X	12
Slovakia	0	0	1	0	0	0	X	X	1

==== Monday, April 20 ====
Draw 4 11:15

Sheet A	1	2	3	4	5	6	7	8	Final
Slovakia	0	0	1	0	0	1	X	X	2
Denmark	3	3	0	3	3	0	X	X	12

Sheet B	1	2	3	4	5	6	7	8	Final
Russia	1	2	1	0	2	0	2	X	8
United States	0	0	0	2	0	1	0	X	3

Sheet C	1	2	3	4	5	6	7	8	Final
Switzerland	0	1	0	0	0	0	1	X	2
Japan	1	0	3	1	1	1	0	X	7

Sheet D	1	2	3	4	5	6	7	8	Final
France	1	0	3	0	3	1	0	1	9
Australia	0	1	0	2	0	0	4	0	7

Sheet E	1	2	3	4	5	6	7	8	Final
Turkey	0	0	0	1	0	0	0	0	1
Czech Republic	1	1	1	0	1	1	1	2	8

==== Tuesday, April 21 ====
Draw 5 8:00

Sheet A	1	2	3	4	5	6	7	8	Final
Russia	2	0	0	2	1	0	0	1	6
Japan	0	1	2	0	0	1	1	0	5

Sheet B	1	2	3	4	5	6	7	8	Final
Denmark	0	1	3	0	5	0	0	0	9
Turkey	1	0	0	4	0	1	2	2	10

Sheet C	1	2	3	4	5	6	7	8	Final
Australia	1	2	0	0	0	0	0	X	3
Slovakia	0	0	3	1	1	1	1	X	7

Sheet D	1	2	3	4	5	6	7	8	Final
Czech Republic	2	0	0	0	2	0	0	X	4
Switzerland	0	1	2	2	0	4	1	X	10

Sheet E	1	2	3	4	5	6	7	8	Final
United States	3	0	2	1	2	1	X	X	9
France	0	1	0	0	0	0	X	X	1

Draw 6 17:45

Sheet A	1	2	3	4	5	6	7	8	Final
Denmark	0	2	0	2	1	1	2	X	8
France	2	0	1	0	0	0	0	X	3

Sheet B	1	2	3	4	5	6	7	8	Final
Japan	0	1	1	3	1	2	1	X	9
Australia	1	0	0	0	0	0	0	X	1

Sheet C	1	2	3	4	5	6	7	8	Final
United States	1	0	2	1	1	0	1	X	6
Czech Republic	0	2	0	0	0	1	0	X	3

Sheet D	1	2	3	4	5	6	7	8	Final
Slovakia	0	0	2	0	0	0	1	X	3
Russia	2	2	0	2	1	1	0	X	8

Sheet E	1	2	3	4	5	6	7	8	Final
Switzerland	0	1	0	1	1	2	0	0	5
Turkey	1	0	3	0	0	0	1	1	6

==== Wednesday, April 22 ====
Draw 7 19:30

Sheet A	1	2	3	4	5	6	7	8	Final
Czech Republic	1	0	2	0	5	1	0	X	9
Slovakia	0	3	0	1	0	0	1	X	5

Sheet B	1	2	3	4	5	6	7	8	Final
Switzerland	0	0	1	1	1	0	0	1	4
Russia	2	1	0	0	0	2	2	0	7

Sheet C	1	2	3	4	5	6	7	8	Final
France	4	0	0	0	2	1	1	0	8
Turkey	0	1	1	1	0	0	0	4	7

Sheet D	1	2	3	4	5	6	7	8	Final
Denmark	3	3	0	1	0	1	3	X	11
Japan	0	0	1	0	1	0	0	X	2

Sheet E	1	2	3	4	5	6	7	8	Final
Australia	0	0	2	1	0	1	0	X	4
United States	1	2	0	0	2	0	3	X	8

==== Thursday, April 23 ====
Draw 8 11:15

Sheet A	1	2	3	4	5	6	7	8	Final
Turkey	2	0	1	0	2	0	0	X	5
Russia	0	3	0	2	0	2	4	X	11

Sheet B	1	2	3	4	5	6	7	8	Final
United States	0	3	0	2	2	0	1	X	8
Denmark	1	0	2	0	0	2	0	X	5

Sheet C	1	2	3	4	5	6	7	8	Final
Slovakia	0	0	0	0	0	0	X	X	0
Switzerland	1	1	1	1	3	4	X	X	11

Sheet D	1	2	3	4	5	6	7	8	Final
Australia	0	0	0	0	1	2	1	X	4
Czech Republic	2	2	1	1	0	0	0	X	6

Sheet E	1	2	3	4	5	6	7	8	Final
France	0	4	0	0	1	0	2	0	7
Japan	3	0	2	1	0	3	0	1	10

Draw 9 17:45

Sheet A	1	2	3	4	5	6	7	8	Final
United States	0	0	2	0	0	3	1	0	6
Switzerland	1	1	0	2	4	0	0	1	9

Sheet B	1	2	3	4	5	6	7	8	Final
Slovakia	1	0	0	0	2	0	2	X	5
France	0	2	1	1	0	3	0	X	7

Sheet C	1	2	3	4	5	6	7	8	Final
Czech Republic	1	0	2	0	2	0	0	0	5
Denmark	0	1	0	2	0	1	1	1	6

Sheet D	1	2	3	4	5	6	7	8	Final
Japan	2	2	0	2	1	0	2	X	9
Turkey	0	0	1	0	0	4	0	X	5

Sheet E	1	2	3	4	5	6	7	8	Final
Russia	3	1	1	2	0	1	X	X	8
Australia	0	0	0	0	1	0	X	X	1

=== Group B ===
==== Saturday, April 18 ====
Draw 1 12:30

Sheet A	1	2	3	4	5	6	7	8	Final
Norway	0	1	1	0	2	0	0	3	7
Italy	1	0	0	2	0	1	1	0	5

Sheet B	1	2	3	4	5	6	7	8	Final
Sweden	0	4	1	2	0	2	0	X	9
Slovenia	2	0	0	0	1	0	1	X	4

Sheet C	1	2	3	4	5	6	7	8	Final
Brazil	1	1	0	0	0	2	1	0	5
Austria	0	0	3	2	1	0	0	1	7

Sheet D	1	2	3	4	5	6	7	8	Final
China	1	0	0	1	1	0	0	0	3
Latvia	0	4	1	0	0	1	1	1	8

Sheet E	1	2	3	4	5	6	7	8	Final
New Zealand	0	0	0	0	2	1	X	X	3
Finland	3	4	3	1	0	0	X	X	11

Draw 2 19:30

Sheet A	1	2	3	4	5	6	7	8	Final
Slovenia	0	0	0	0	2	0	1	X	3
China	3	1	1	2	0	1	0	X	8

Sheet B	1	2	3	4	5	6	7	8	Final
Italy	1	2	1	1	3	1	X	X	9
Latvia	0	0	0	0	0	0	X	X	0

Sheet C	1	2	3	4	5	6	7	8	Final
New Zealand	2	0	1	0	0	0	3	X	6
Norway	0	3	0	3	1	1	0	X	8

Sheet D	1	2	3	4	5	6	7	8	Final
Finland	1	1	3	1	3	0	2	X	11
Austria	0	0	0	0	0	2	0	X	2

Sheet E	1	2	3	4	5	6	7	8	Final
Sweden	2	2	0	2	1	0	X	X	7
Brazil	0	0	0	0	0	0	X	X	0

==== Sunday, April 19 ====
Draw 3 14:30

Sheet A	1	2	3	4	5	6	7	8	Final
Austria	0	2	0	0	1	0	1	0	4
Sweden	1	0	2	1	0	1	0	1	6

Sheet B	1	2	3	4	5	6	7	8	Final
Norway	3	0	0	4	1	0	1	X	9
Finland	0	1	1	0	0	1	0	X	3

Sheet C	1	2	3	4	5	6	7	8	9	Final
Italy	0	2	0	1	0	3	0	0	1	7
China	1	0	1	0	1	0	1	2	0	6

Sheet D	1	2	3	4	5	6	7	8	Final
Brazil	0	3	1	0	1	0	3	0	8
New Zealand	1	0	0	5	0	2	0	2	10

Sheet E	1	2	3	4	5	6	7	8	Final
Slovenia	0	0	0	0	2	0	3	X	5
Latvia	3	2	2	1	0	1	0	X	9

==== Monday, April 20 ====
Draw 4 9:00

Sheet A	1	2	3	4	5	6	7	8	Final
Latvia	1	1	3	0	3	1	X	X	9
New Zealand	0	0	0	1	0	0	X	X	1

Sheet B	1	2	3	4	5	6	7	8	Final
Brazil	1	0	0	0	2	0	0	X	3
China	0	4	1	2	0	2	1	X	10

Sheet C	1	2	3	4	5	6	7	8	Final
Finland	3	0	3	0	2	0	3	X	11
Slovenia	0	1	0	1	0	4	0	X	6

Sheet D	1	2	3	4	5	6	7	8	Final
Austria	0	0	1	0	1	0	0	0	2
Norway	1	1	0	1	0	1	1	1	6

Sheet E	1	2	3	4	5	6	7	8	9	Final
Italy	1	1	0	0	1	0	0	2	0	5
Sweden	0	0	2	1	0	1	1	0	5	10

==== Tuesday, April 21 ====
Draw 5 11:15

Sheet A	1	2	3	4	5	6	7	8	9	Final
Brazil	0	1	1	0	2	0	0	2	0	6
Slovenia	1	0	0	1	0	3	1	0	3	9

Sheet B	1	2	3	4	5	6	7	8	Final
New Zealand	0	1	0	3	1	1	0	1	7
Italy	2	0	2	0	0	0	4	0	8

Sheet C	1	2	3	4	5	6	7	8	Final
Norway	0	3	4	2	0	4	X	X	13
Latvia	2	0	0	0	1	0	X	X	3

Sheet D	1	2	3	4	5	6	7	8	Final
Sweden	0	1	0	0	1	0	X	X	2
Finland	2	0	4	1	0	1	X	X	8

Sheet E	1	2	3	4	5	6	7	8	Final
China	1	1	0	3	0	3	1	X	9
Austria	0	0	1	0	1	0	0	X	2

Draw 6 21:00

Sheet A	1	2	3	4	5	6	7	8	Final
New Zealand	2	1	0	1	0	2	0	1	7
Austria	0	0	4	0	2	0	3	0	9

Sheet B	1	2	3	4	5	6	7	8	Final
Slovenia	0	0	0	1	0	0	X	X	1
Norway	5	1	2	0	3	1	X	X	12

Sheet C	1	2	3	4	5	6	7	8	9	Final
China	0	1	0	3	1	0	0	1	1	7
Sweden	1	0	2	0	0	2	1	0	0	6

Sheet D	1	2	3	4	5	6	7	8	Final
Latvia	2	2	0	3	2	0	1	X	10
Brazil	0	0	3	0	0	1	0	X	4

Sheet E	1	2	3	4	5	6	7	8	Final
Finland	0	0	2	1	0	0	0	0	3
Italy	1	1	0	0	1	1	1	1	6

==== Wednesday, April 22 ====
Draw 7 12:30

Sheet A	1	2	3	4	5	6	7	8	Final
Sweden	1	1	0	0	3	1	0	1	7
Latvia	0	0	3	2	0	0	1	0	6

Sheet B	1	2	3	4	5	6	7	8	Final
Finland	2	2	0	2	3	1	X	X	10
Brazil	0	0	1	0	0	0	X	X	1

Sheet C	1	2	3	4	5	6	7	8	9	Final
Austria	1	0	0	1	1	0	0	2	0	5
Italy	0	1	2	0	0	1	1	0	1	6

Sheet D	1	2	3	4	5	6	7	8	Final
New Zealand	2	0	3	2	2	1	0	X	10
Slovenia	0	4	0	0	0	0	1	X	5

Sheet E	1	2	3	4	5	6	7	8	Final
Norway	1	2	1	0	3	0	0	X	7
China	0	0	0	2	0	1	1	X	4

==== Thursday, April 23 ====
Draw 8 8:00

Sheet A	1	2	3	4	5	6	7	8	Final
Italy	1	0	1	0	0	3	0	X	5
Brazil	0	5	0	4	2	0	1	X	12

Sheet B	1	2	3	4	5	6	7	8	Final
China	0	1	0	0	2	1	1	0	5
New Zealand	1	0	1	1	0	0	0	1	4

Sheet C	1	2	3	4	5	6	7	8	9	Final
Latvia	0	1	2	0	4	4	0	0	1	12
Finland	4	0	0	5	0	0	1	1	0	11

Sheet D	1	2	3	4	5	6	7	8	Final
Norway	2	0	2	2	2	2	X	X	10
Sweden	0	2	0	0	0	0	X	X	2

Sheet E	1	2	3	4	5	6	7	8	Final
Austria	0	2	0	2	0	0	0	0	4
Slovenia	1	0	2	0	1	1	1	1	7

Draw 9 14:30

Sheet A	1	2	3	4	5	6	7	8	Final
China	0	2	1	0	1	0	0	0	4
Finland	2	0	0	2	0	1	1	1	7

Sheet B	1	2	3	4	5	6	7	8	9	Final
Latvia	1	0	1	0	2	0	3	0	5	12
Austria	0	1	0	1	0	1	0	4	0	7

Sheet C	1	2	3	4	5	6	7	8	9	Final
Sweden	0	2	3	0	1	0	0	0	1	7
New Zealand	1	0	0	1	0	2	1	1	0	6

Sheet D	1	2	3	4	5	6	7	8	Final
Slovenia	0	0	1	0	0	0	0	X	1
Italy	2	2	0	1	1	2	2	X	10

Sheet E	1	2	3	4	5	6	7	8	Final
Brazil	0	0	4	0	0	2	1	X	7
Norway	3	3	0	2	2	0	0	X	10

=== Group C ===
==== Saturday, April 18 ====
Draw 1 16:00

Sheet A	1	2	3	4	5	6	7	8	Final
Belarus	0	0	3	0	0	4	0	X	7
Spain	2	1	0	4	2	0	2	X	11

Sheet B	1	2	3	4	5	6	7	8	Final
Canada	3	0	1	3	0	2	0	X	9
Hungary	0	2	0	0	3	0	2	X	7

Sheet C	1	2	3	4	5	6	7	8	Final
England	1	0	0	0	0	0	0	X	1
Estonia	0	2	2	2	2	1	1	X	10

Sheet D	1	2	3	4	5	6	7	8	Final
Scotland	4	2	3	2	5	X	X	X	16
Romania	0	0	0	0	0	X	X	X	0

Sheet E	1	2	3	4	5	6	7	8	Final
South Korea	3	0	2	0	1	1	1	0	8
Poland	0	1	0	2	0	0	0	1	4

==== Sunday, April 19 ====
Draw 2 8:00

Sheet A	1	2	3	4	5	6	7	8	Final
Hungary	0	1	0	2	1	2	2	X	8
Scotland	3	0	2	0	0	0	0	X	5

Sheet B	1	2	3	4	5	6	7	8	Final
Spain	1	0	2	0	1	1	3	X	8
Romania	0	2	0	2	0	0	0	X	4

Sheet C	1	2	3	4	5	6	7	8	Final
South Korea	1	1	1	2	1	1	0	X	7
Belarus	0	0	0	0	0	0	1	X	1

Sheet D	1	2	3	4	5	6	7	8	Final
Poland	0	2	0	0	0	0	X	X	2
Estonia	4	0	2	2	2	1	X	X	11

Sheet E	1	2	3	4	5	6	7	8	Final
Canada	1	1	0	4	0	0	5	X	11
England	0	0	1	0	1	1	0	X	3

Draw 3 17:45

Sheet A	1	2	3	4	5	6	7	8	Final
Estonia	0	2	0	0	0	0	0	X	2
Canada	2	0	0	2	2	2	1	X	9

Sheet B	1	2	3	4	5	6	7	8	Final
Belarus	0	2	1	0	1	0	1	0	5
Poland	1	0	0	2	0	1	0	2	6

Sheet C	1	2	3	4	5	6	7	8	Final
Spain	0	3	0	3	0	3	0	1	10
Scotland	5	0	1	0	1	0	2	0	9

Sheet D	1	2	3	4	5	6	7	8	Final
England	2	0	1	0	0	3	0	X	6
South Korea	0	2	0	2	3	0	1	X	8

Sheet E	1	2	3	4	5	6	7	8	Final
Hungary	1	2	3	0	3	1	X	X	10
Romania	0	0	0	1	0	0	X	X	1

==== Monday, April 20 ====
Draw 4 12:30

Sheet A	1	2	3	4	5	6	7	8	Final
Romania	0	0	0	0	0	0	X	X	0
South Korea	5	1	3	1	1	1	X	X	12

Sheet B	1	2	3	4	5	6	7	8	9	Final
England	0	0	0	3	0	2	0	3	1	9
Scotland	1	2	2	0	2	0	1	0	0	8

Sheet C	1	2	3	4	5	6	7	8	Final
Poland	0	1	0	1	0	0	X	X	2
Hungary	1	0	3	0	4	3	X	X	11

Sheet D	1	2	3	4	5	6	7	8	Final
Estonia	0	3	2	0	0	3	1	X	9
Belarus	1	0	0	3	1	0	0	X	5

Sheet E	1	2	3	4	5	6	7	8	Final
Spain	0	2	1	0	0	0	X	X	3
Canada	5	0	0	4	1	1	X	X	11

Draw 5 19:30

Sheet A	1	2	3	4	5	6	7	8	Final
England	0	0	0	0	1	0	0	X	1
Hungary	5	1	1	1	0	1	4	X	13

Sheet B	1	2	3	4	5	6	7	8	Final
South Korea	2	1	2	2	0	0	0	1	9
Spain	0	0	0	0	1	2	2	0	5

Sheet C	1	2	3	4	5	6	7	8	Final
Belarus	2	0	1	1	1	0	0	1	6
Romania	0	5	0	0	0	1	1	0	7

Sheet D	1	2	3	4	5	6	7	8	Final
Canada	1	1	1	0	4	1	X	X	8
Poland	0	0	0	2	0	0	X	X	2

Sheet E	1	2	3	4	5	6	7	8	Final
Scotland	0	1	0	4	1	0	1	0	7
Estonia	4	0	1	0	0	2	0	1	8

==== Tuesday, April 21 ====
Draw 6 14:30

Sheet A	1	2	3	4	5	6	7	8	Final
South Korea	0	0	1	1	0	1	2	X	5
Estonia	2	3	0	0	3	0	0	X	8

Sheet B	1	2	3	4	5	6	7	8	Final
Hungary	1	0	0	3	0	3	2	1	10
Belarus	0	3	3	0	1	0	0	0	7

Sheet C	1	2	3	4	5	6	7	8	Final
Scotland	2	0	1	2	0	0	3	1	9
Canada	0	1	0	0	1	3	0	0	5

Sheet D	1	2	3	4	5	6	7	8	Final
Romania	0	2	0	1	0	0	X	X	3
England	3	0	2	0	4	2	X	X	11

Sheet E	1	2	3	4	5	6	7	8	Final
Poland	0	0	1	0	1	0	0	X	2
Spain	1	1	0	2	0	1	1	X	6

==== Wednesday, April 22 ====
Draw 7 9:00

Sheet A	1	2	3	4	5	6	7	8	Final
Canada	3	0	3	0	1	0	1	X	8
Romania	0	1	0	1	0	1	0	X	3

Sheet B	1	2	3	4	5	6	7	8	Final
Poland	0	2	0	0	0	1	0	X	3
England	2	0	2	1	1	0	1	X	7

Sheet C	1	2	3	4	5	6	7	8	Final
Estonia	1	1	1	0	0	0	0	0	3
Spain	0	0	0	1	1	3	1	1	7

Sheet D	1	2	3	4	5	6	7	8	Final
South Korea	1	0	1	0	1	0	X	X	3
Hungary	0	4	0	3	0	3	X	X	10

Sheet E	1	2	3	4	5	6	7	8	Final
Belarus	0	1	0	0	2	0	0	X	3
Scotland	1	0	1	1	0	4	1	X	8

Draw 8 16:00

Sheet A	1	2	3	4	5	6	7	8	Final
Spain	1	0	0	1	0	1	0	1	4
England	0	2	1	0	3	0	1	0	7

Sheet B	1	2	3	4	5	6	7	8	Final
Scotland	3	1	3	1	0	1	0	X	9
South Korea	0	0	0	0	2	0	1	X	3

Sheet C	1	2	3	4	5	6	7	8	Final
Romania	0	1	0	0	1	1	0	X	3
Poland	4	0	2	1	0	0	4	X	11

Sheet D	1	2	3	4	5	6	7	8	Final
Belarus	0	0	0	1	0	0	0	X	1
Canada	1	2	1	0	2	1	1	X	8

Sheet E	1	2	3	4	5	6	7	8	Final
Estonia	0	2	0	1	0	1	0	2	6
Hungary	1	0	2	0	1	0	1	0	5

==== Thursday, April 23 ====
Draw 9 21:00

Sheet A	1	2	3	4	5	6	7	8	Final
Scotland	0	2	1	2	0	0	2	3	10
Poland	1	0	0	0	3	1	0	0	5

Sheet B	1	2	3	4	5	6	7	8	Final
Romania	0	1	0	0	0	1	0	X	2
Estonia	6	0	1	1	1	0	1	X	10

Sheet C	1	2	3	4	5	6	7	8	Final
Canada	3	0	2	2	0	1	4	X	12
South Korea	0	2	0	0	1	0	0	X	3

Sheet D	1	2	3	4	5	6	7	8	9	Final
Hungary	2	1	0	0	0	2	0	1	2	8
Spain	0	0	2	1	1	0	2	0	0	6

Sheet E	1	2	3	4	5	6	7	8	Final
England	3	0	3	2	0	3	X	X	11
Belarus	0	1	0	0	1	0	0	X	2

== Tiebreakers ==
Friday, April 24 8:00

Sheet B	1	2	3	4	5	6	7	8	Final
Denmark	0	2	1	0	1	1	0	1	6
Japan	2	0	0	1	0	0	1	0	4

Sheet C	1	2	3	4	5	6	7	8	Final
Italy	2	1	0	1	0	2	2	1	9
Latvia	0	0	4	0	3	0	0	0	7

Sheet D	1	2	3	4	5	6	7	8	Final
Finland	0	2	0	2	0	1	1	0	6
Sweden	1	0	2	0	3	0	0	1	7

== Playoffs ==
Qualification Game
A3	Denmark	8
B3	Italy	4

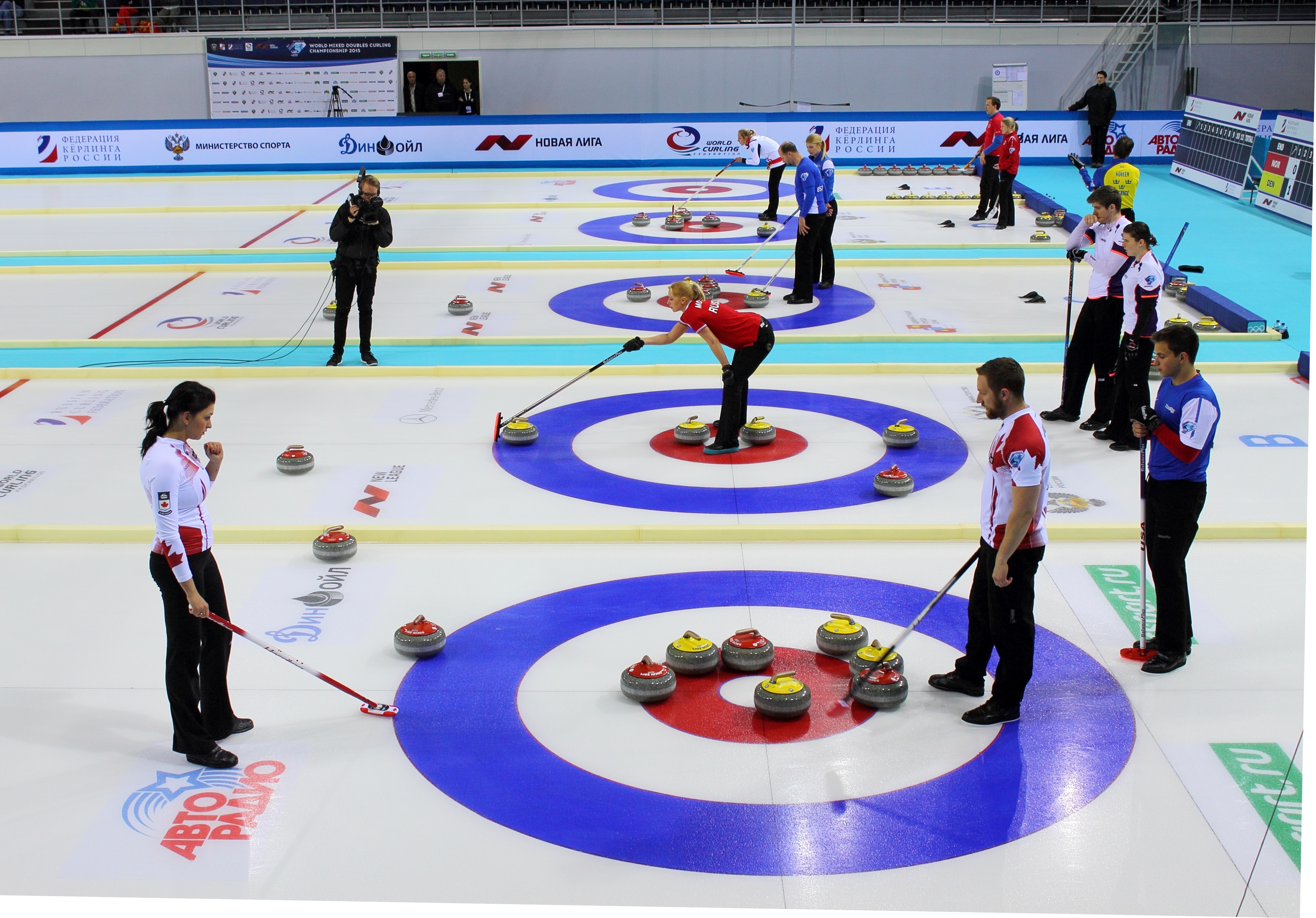
Quarterfinals

Quarterfinals
C1	Canada	9
A2	United States	6
B2	Sweden	8
C2	Estonia	3
B1	Norway	6
A3	Denmark	4
A1	Russia	4
C3	Hungary	10

Semifinals
C1	Canada	6
B2	Sweden	8
B1	Norway	6
C3	Hungary	9

Gold Medal Game
B2	Sweden	5
C3	Hungary	6

Bronze Medal Game
C1	Canada	4
B1	Norway	9

=== Qualification Game ===
Friday, April 24, 15:30

Sheet A	1	2	3	4	5	6	7	8	Final
Denmark	0	0	3	0	2	0	3	X	8
Italy	1	1	0	1	0	1	0	X	4

=== Quarterfinals ===
Friday, April 24, 20:00

Sheet A	1	2	3	4	5	6	7	8	Final
Canada	2	0	3	0	3	0	1	X	9
United States	0	2	0	3	0	1	0	X	6

Sheet B	1	2	3	4	5	6	7	8	Final
Russia	2	0	1	0	0	1	0	0	4
Hungary	0	2	0	3	1	0	1	3	10

Sheet C	1	2	3	4	5	6	7	8	Final
Sweden	0	0	2	1	2	0	3	X	8
Estonia	1	1	0	0	0	1	0	X	3

Sheet D	1	2	3	4	5	6	7	8	Final
Norway	0	2	0	1	0	1	1	1	6
Denmark	1	0	1	0	2	0	0	0	4

=== Semifinals ===
Saturday, April 25, 10:30

Sheet B	1	2	3	4	5	6	7	8	Final
Norway	0	3	0	3	0	0	0	X	6
Hungary	2	0	3	0	2	1	1	X	9

Sheet D	1	2	3	4	5	6	7	8	Final
Canada	0	0	0	2	1	0	3	0	6
Sweden	2	1	1	0	0	2	0	2	8

=== Bronze medal game ===
Saturday, April 25, 15:30

Sheet A	1	2	3	4	5	6	7	8	Final
Canada	0	0	1	0	2	1	0	X	4
Norway	3	4	0	1	0	0	1	X	9

=== Gold medal game ===
Saturday, April 25, 15:30

Sheet C	1	2	3	4	5	6	7	8	Final
Sweden	2	0	0	0	1	1	0	1	5
Hungary	0	2	1	1	0	0	2	0	6
