= Dmitry Kirillov (curler) =

Belarusian male curler and curling coach

- Curler
- Born: 15 May 1968 (age 58)

Curling career
- World Mixed Doubles Championship: 2 (2014, 2015)
- European Championship: 8 (2006, 2008, 2009, 2010, 2011, 2012, 2013, 2014)
- Other appearances: World Mixed Championship: 1 (2015), European Mixed Championship: 5 (2009, 2010, 2011, 2012, 2013)
Medal record
Curling
Representing Belarus

Dmitry Kirillov (Belarusian: Дми́трий Кири́ллов, Russian: Дми́трий Кири́ллов; born 15 May 1968) is a Belarusian male curler and curling coach.

== Teams and events ==
=== Men's ===
Season	Skip	Third	Second	Lead	Alternate	Coach	Events
2006–07	Yauhen Puchkou	Ihar Mishaniov	Yauheni Mamadaliyeu	Barys Rutman	Dmitry Kirillov		ECC 2006 (23rd)
2008–09	Yauhen Puchkou	Dmitry Yarko	Ihar Mishaniov	Dmitry Kirillov	Yauheni Fedchun		ECC 2008 (28th)
2009–10	Dmitry Kirillov	Dmitry Yarko	Pavel Petrov	Igor Mishenev		Ekaterina Kirillova	ECC 2009 (22nd)
2010–11	Dmitry Kirillov	Pavel Petrov	Dmitry Yarko	Ilya Kazlouski			ECC-C 2010 (silver)
2010–11	Dmitry Kirillov	Dmitry Yarko	Pavel Petrov	Igor Mishenev		Ekaterina Kirillova	ECC 2010 (22nd)
2011–12	Ihar Platonov	Yury Pauliuchyk	Andrey Aulasenka	Yuri Karanevich	Dmitry Kirillov	Ekaterina Kirillova	ECC 2011 (25th)
2011–12	Dmitry Kirillov	Pavel Petrov	Dmitry Yarko	Andrey Aulasenka	George Kirillov		ECC-C 2012 (4th)
2012–13	Dmitry Kirillov	Pavel Petrov	Yury Pauliuchyk	Andrey Aulasenka	Ihar Platonov	Artis Zentelis	ECC-C 2013 (5th)
2013–14	Dmitry Kirillov	Pavel Petrov	Ilya Kazlouski	Andrey Aulasenka	Oleksii Voloshenko	Ekaterina Kirillova	ECC-C 2014 (5th)

=== Mixed ===
Season	Skip	Third	Second	Lead	Alternate	Events
2009–10	Dmitry Kirillov	Ekaterina Kirillova	Dmitry Yarko	Ewgeniya Orlis	Anna Alexandrovich	EMxCC 2009 (23rd)
2010–11	Dmitry Kirillov	Ekaterina Kirillova	Dmitry Yarko	Alina Pavlyuchik		EMxCC 2010 (20th)
2011–12	Dmitry Kirillov	Alina Pavlyuchik	Dmitry Yarko	Ekaterina Kirillova	Natalia Sverzhinskaya, Susanna Ivashyna	EMCC 2011 (21st)
2012–13	Dmitry Kirillov	Alina Pavlyuchik	Dmitry Yarko	Ekaterina Kirillova	Andrey Aulasenka	EMCC 2012 (20th)
2013–14	Alina Pavlyuchik (fourth)	Dmitry Kirillov	Ekaterina Kirillova (skip)	George Kirillov		EMCC 2013 (16th)
2015–16	Pavel Petrov	Ekaterina Kirillova	Dmitry Kirillov	Polina Petrova		WMxCC 2015 (31st)

=== Mixed doubles ===
Season	Male	Female	Events
2013–14	Dmitry Kirillov	Ekaterina Kirillova	WMDCC 2014 (31st)
2014–15	Dmitry Kirillov	Ekaterina Kirillova	WMDCC 2015 (29th)

== Coaching (national teams) ==
Season	Event	Team	Place
2011–12	2011 European Curling Championships	Belarus (women)	23rd
2012–13	2012 European Curling Championships	Belarus (women)	19th
