= Susanna Ivashyna =

Belarusian female curler

- Curler
- Born: 30 June 1972 (age 54)

Team
- Mixed doubles partner: Dmitriy Barkan

Curling career
- European Championship: 6 (2011, 2012, 2014, 2016, 2017, 2019)
- Other appearances: World Mixed Championship: 1 (2018), European Mixed Championship: 2 (2011, 2014)
Medal record
Curling
Representing Belarus

Susanna Ivashyna (Belarusian: Сюза́нна Ива́шина, Russian: Сюза́нна Ива́шина; born 30 June 1972) is a Belarusian female curler. She is right-handed.

== Achievements ==
- Belarusian Mixed Curling Championship: gold (2018).

== Teams and events ==
=== Women's ===
Season	Skip	Third	Second	Lead	Alternate	Coach	Events
2010–11	Ekaterina Kirillova	Alina Pavlyuchik	Natalia Sverzhinskaya	Susanna Ivashyna		Dmitry Kirillov	ECC-C 2011 (5th)
2011–12	Ekaterina Kirillova	Alina Pavlyuchik	Natalia Sverzhinskaya	Susanna Ivashyna	Arina Sverzhinskaya		ECC-C 2012 (gold)
2012–13	Ekaterina Kirillova	Alina Pavlyuchik	Susanna Ivashyna	Natalia Sverzhinskaya	Arina Sverzhinskaya	Dmitry Kirillov	ECC 2012 (19th)
2014–15	Alina Pavlyuchik	Natalia Sverzhinskaya	Susanna Ivashyna	Ekaterina Kirillova	Arina Sverzhinskaya	Katja Kiiskinen	ECC 2014 (19th)
2016–17	Alina Pavlyuchik	Susanna Ivashyna	Arina Sverzhinskaya	Marharyta Dziashuk	Natalia Sverzhinskaya	Aleksandr Orlov	ECC 2016 (17th)
2017–18	Alina Pavlyuchik	Susanna Ivashyna	Arina Sverzhinskaya	Marharyta Dziashuk	Natalia Sverzhinskaya	Aleksandr Orlov	ECC 2017 (20th)
2018–19	Alina Pavlyuchik	Susanna Ivashyna	Arina Sverzhinskaya	Marharyta Dziashuk	Natalia Sverzhinskaya	Aleksandr Orlov	ECC-C 2019 (gold)

=== Mixed ===
Season	Skip	Third	Second	Lead	Alternate	Coach	Events
2011–12	Dmitry Kirillov	Alina Pavlyuchik	Dmitry Yarko	Ekaterina Kirillova	Natalia Sverzhinskaya, Susanna Ivashyna		EMCC 2011 (21st)
2014–15	Alina Pavlyuchik	Oleksii Voloshenko	Susanna Ivashyna	Yury Pauliuchyk			EMCC 2014 (20th)
2015–16	Dmitry Yarko	Susanna Ivashyna	Ilya Shalamitski	Vera Dosava			BMxCC 2016 (7th)
2016–17	Susanna Ivashyna	Yury Karanevich	Arina Sverzhinskaya	Vitaly Burmistrov			BMxCC 2017 (5th)
2017–18	Ilya Shalamitski	Susanna Ivashyna	Yevgeny Tamkovich	Tatsiana Tarsunova			BMxCC 2018 (gold)
2018–19	Ilya Shalamitski (fourth)	Susanna Ivashyna (skip)	Yevgeny Tamkovich	Tatsiana Tarsunova		Anton Batugin	WMxCC 2018 (14th)

=== Mixed doubles ===
Season	Male	Female	Events
2018–19	Dmitriy Barkan	Susanna Ivashyna	BMDCC 2019 (5th)
