= 2016 World Mixed Doubles Curling Championship =

- Host city: Karlstad, Sweden
- Arena: Karlstad Curling Arena
- Dates: April 16–23, 2016
- Winner: Russia
- Female: Anastasia Bryzgalova
- Male: Alexander Krushelnitskiy
- Coach: Vasily Gudin, Daniel Rafael
- Finalist: China

The 2016 World Mixed Doubles Curling Championship was held from April 16 to 23 at the Karlstad Curling Arena in Karlstad, Sweden. The event was held in conjunction with the 2016 World Senior Curling Championships.

== Teams ==
The teams are listed as follows:

Country	Male	Female	Coach
Australia	Ian Palangio	Laurie Weeden	
Austria	Sebastian Wunderer	Karina Toth	Uli Kapp
Belarus	Pavel Petrov	Polina Petrova	Aleksandr Orlov
Belgium	Martijn Van De Walle	Melody Versele	Chris van Rosmalen
Brazil	Marcelo Mello	Aline Lima	Anders Kraupp
Bulgaria	Reto Seiler	Marina Yaneva	
Canada	Dustin Kalthoff	Marliese Kasner	Jeff Stoughton
China	Ba Dexin	Wang Rui	Millard Evans
Czech Republic	Jiří Candra	Anna Kubešková	Karel Kubeška
Denmark	Mikael Qvist	Trine Qvist	Christian Thune-Jacobsen
England	Ben Fowler	Anna Fowler	Nigel Patrick
Estonia	Harri Lill	Marie Turmann	Brian Gray
Finland	Tomi Rantamäki	Oona Kauste	
France	Romain Borini	Sandrine Morand	Alain Bliggenstorfer
Germany	Rainer Schöpp	Andrea Schöpp	Adolf Geiselhart
Hungary	Zsolt Kiss	Dorottya Palancsa	Zoltán Palancsa
Ireland	Neil Fyfe	Alison Fyfe	Peter J. D. Wilson
Israel	Leonid Rivkind	Rachel Katzman	Simon Pack
Italy	Marco Pascale	Lucrezia Laurenti	
Japan	Takuma Makanae	Eri Araki	James Douglas Lind
Kazakhstan	Viktor Kim	Olga Ten	Erkki Lill
South Korea	Lee Ki-jeong	Jang Hye-ji	Jang Banseok
Latvia	Artis Zentelis	Ieva Rudzīte	Robert Krusts
Lithuania	Tadas Vyskupaitis	Virginija Paulauskaitė	Allen Gulka
Luxembourg	Marco Etienne	Karen Wauters	
Netherlands	Thomas Kooi	Bonnie Nilhamn	Reg Wiebe
New Zealand	Scott Becker	Bridget Becker	Hans Frauenlob
Norway	Magnus Nedregotten	Kristin Skaslien	Ole Ingvaldsen
Poland	Michał Janowski	Aneta Lipińska	Andrzej Janowski
Qatar	Yazid Alyafei	Maryam Binali	Lajos Belleli
Romania	Allen Coliban	Daiana Colceriu	Fabian Wingfors
Russia	Alexander Krushelnitskiy	Anastasia Bryzgalova	Vasily Gudin, Daniel Rafael
Scotland	Bruce Mouat	Gina Aitken	David Aitken
Serbia	Filip Stojanović	Dara Stojanović	Camilla Skaarberg Jensen
Slovakia	Ladislav Derzsi	Daniela Matulová	Milan Bubenik
Slovenia	Jure Čulić	Ajda Zavrtanik Drglin	Matej Smuc
Spain	Gontzal García	Irantzu García	Kalynn Park
Sweden	Per Noréen	Camilla Noréen	Mikael Andersson
Switzerland	Yves Hess	Flurina Kobler	Laurence Bidaud
Turkey	Kadir Çakır	Dilşat Yıldız	Fatih Agduman
United States	Joe Polo	Tabitha Peterson	Wally Henry
Wales	Adrian Meikle	Dawn Watson	Chris Wells

== Round-robin standings ==
Key
Teams to Playoffs
Teams to Tiebreaker

Group A	W	L
Hungary	6	0
Slovakia	4	2
Bulgaria	3	3
Poland	3	3
Switzerland	3	3
Latvia	2	4
Belgium	0	6

Group D	W	L
Canada	6	0
China	5	1
Ireland	3	3
Italy	3	3
France	3	3
Australia	1	5
Serbia	0	6

Group B	W	L
Finland	6	0
South Korea	4	2
Austria	4	2
Lithuania	3	3
Sweden	3	3
Germany	1	5
Slovenia	0	6

Group E	W	L
United States	6	0
New Zealand	5	1
Denmark	4	2
Spain	3	3
Belarus	2	4
Israel	1	5
Netherlands	0	6

Group C	W	L
Norway	6	0
England	5	1
Turkey	4	2
Japan	3	3
Luxembourg	2	4
Romania	1	5
Kazakhstan	0	6

Group F	W	L
Russia	5	1
Estonia	5	1
Scotland	4	2
Czech Republic	4	2
Brazil	2	4
Wales	1	5
Qatar	0	6

== Round-robin results ==
All draw times are listed in Central European Time (UTC+1).

=== Group A ===
==== Saturday, April 16 ====
Draw 1 12:00

Sheet B	1	2	3	4	5	6	7	8	Final
Hungary	1	1	0	3	1	2	3	X	11
Slovakia	0	0	1	0	0	0	0	X	1

Sheet C	1	2	3	4	5	6	7	8	Final
Belgium	0	0	1	0	0	0	1	X	2
Switzerland	5	1	0	3	2	2	0	X	13

Sheet E	1	2	3	4	5	6	7	8	Final
Poland	0	3	0	1	0	0	0	X	4
Latvia	4	0	3	0	1	1	1	X	10

==== Sunday, April 17 ====
Draw 5 11:15

Sheet A	1	2	3	4	5	6	7	8	Final
Hungary	0	5	2	3	2	2	X	X	14
Belgium	1	0	0	0	0	0	X	X	1

Sheet C	1	2	3	4	5	6	7	8	9	10	Final
Slovakia	0	1	0	1	2	0	0	1	0	2	7
Poland	1	0	2	0	0	1	1	0	0	0	5

Sheet D	1	2	3	4	5	6	7	8	Final
Latvia	2	0	2	0	2	1	0	0	7
Bulgaria	0	1	0	5	0	0	1	3	10

Draw 7 17:45

Sheet B	1	2	3	4	5	6	7	8	Final
Bulgaria	0	1	0	0	1	0	X	X	2
Hungary	1	0	4	2	0	3	X	X	10

Draw 8 21:00

Sheet B	1	2	3	4	5	6	7	8	Final
Latvia	1	0	0	2	0	0	1	0	4
Switzerland	0	1	1	0	2	2	0	1	7

Sheet E	1	2	3	4	5	6	7	8	Final
Belgium	0	0	4	0	0	0	0	X	4
Slovakia	1	1	0	3	2	4	4	X	15

==== Monday, April 18 ====
Draw 9 8:00

Sheet E	1	2	3	4	5	6	7	8	Final
Bulgaria	0	0	1	0	0	2	0	X	3
Poland	1	1	0	2	1	0	3	X	8

Draw 12 17:45

Sheet C	1	2	3	4	5	6	7	8	Final
Latvia	2	0	1	0	0	1	0	X	4
Hungary	0	1	0	3	2	0	3	X	9

Sheet D	1	2	3	4	5	6	7	8	Final
Switzerland	1	0	1	2	1	0	0	0	5
Slovakia	0	1	0	0	0	1	1	1	4

==== Tuesday, April 19 ====
Draw 14 8:00

Sheet C	1	2	3	4	5	6	7	8	Final
Switzerland	0	0	2	0	1	0	2	0	5
Bulgaria	1	1	0	1	0	1	0	2	6

Sheet D	1	2	3	4	5	6	7	8	Final
Hungary	0	4	0	0	2	1	0	X	7
Poland	1	0	1	2	0	0	1	X	5

Draw 15 11:15

Sheet A	1	2	3	4	5	6	7	8	Final
Belgium	0	1	0	0	0	0	X	X	1
Latvia	3	0	3	2	1	2	X	X	11

==== Wednesday, April 20 ====
Draw 20 11:15

Sheet A	1	2	3	4	5	6	7	8	Final
Slovakia	4	1	2	4	0	0	3	X	14
Bulgaria	0	0	0	0	1	3	0	X	4

Sheet B	1	2	3	4	5	6	7	8	Final
Poland	3	1	2	0	1	1	X	X	8
Belgium	0	0	0	2	0	0	X	X	2

Sheet E	1	2	3	4	5	6	7	8	Final
Switzerland	1	0	1	0	0	1	0	X	3
Hungary	0	1	0	2	3	0	1	X	7

Draw 22 17:45

Sheet A	1	2	3	4	5	6	7	8	Final
Poland	0	3	3	4	0	0	0	X	10
Switzerland	1	0	0	0	1	1	1	X	4

Sheet B	1	2	3	4	5	6	7	8	Final
Slovakia	1	0	1	0	3	0	0	4	9
Latvia	0	1	0	1	0	3	3	0	8

Sheet D	1	2	3	4	5	6	7	8	Final
Bulgaria	6	0	1	1	1	2	X	X	11
Belgium	0	1	0	0	0	0	X	X	1

=== Group B ===
==== Saturday, April 16 ====
Draw 3 20:00

Sheet C	1	2	3	4	5	6	7	8	Final
Finland	5	2	3	0	0	1	2	X	13
Lithuania	0	0	0	2	1	0	0	X	3

Sheet D	1	2	3	4	5	6	7	8	Final
Sweden	0	3	0	1	1	0	1	0	6
Austria	1	0	3	0	0	2	0	2	8

Sheet E	1	2	3	4	5	6	7	8	9	Final
Germany	0	0	1	1	1	1	0	2	0	6
South Korea	3	2	0	0	0	0	1	0	1	7

==== Sunday, April 17 ====
Draw 6 14:30

Sheet D	1	2	3	4	5	6	7	8	Final
South Korea	3	0	0	4	2	0	X	X	9
Slovenia	0	1	1	0	0	1	X	X	3

Draw 8 21:00

Sheet A	1	2	3	4	5	6	7	8	Final
Sweden	0	0	0	0	2	0	X	X	2
Finland	1	1	3	1	0	2	X	X	8

Sheet C	1	2	3	4	5	6	7	8	Final
Austria	1	0	2	3	0	3	X	X	9
Germany	0	1	0	0	1	0	X	X	2

==== Monday, April 18 ====
Draw 9 8:00

Sheet B	1	2	3	4	5	6	7	8	Final
Lithuania	0	0	0	1	0	0	1	X	2
South Korea	1	1	2	0	1	1	0	X	6

Draw 11 14:30

Sheet E	1	2	3	4	5	6	7	8	Final
Finland	2	0	2	0	3	0	0	2	9
Austria	0	1	0	1	0	1	4	0	7

Draw 12 17:45

Sheet B	1	2	3	4	5	6	7	8	Final
Slovenia	1	0	1	0	1	0	0	X	3
Sweden	0	4	0	5	0	2	2	X	13

==== Tuesday, April 19 ====
Draw 15 11:15

Sheet C	1	2	3	4	5	6	7	8	Final
South Korea	0	1	0	1	0	5	0	1	8
Sweden	3	0	3	0	2	0	1	0	9

Sheet E	1	2	3	4	5	6	7	8	Final
Slovenia	0	1	1	0	2	0	0	0	4
Germany	1	0	0	3	0	1	1	1	7

Draw 16 14:30

Sheet D	1	2	3	4	5	6	7	8	Final
Austria	1	0	1	0	0	3	2		W
Lithuania	0	2	0	2	1	0	0		L

- Lithuania ran out of time

Draw 18 21:00

Sheet A	1	2	3	4	5	6	7	8	Final
Finland	0	1	0	2	0	2	1	1	7
South Korea	1	0	1	0	1	0	0	0	3

Sheet C	1	2	3	4	5	6	7	8	Final
Lithuania	2	1	1	2	0	0	0	3	9
Slovenia	0	0	0	0	3	1	1	0	5

Sheet D	1	2	3	4	5	6	7	8	Final
Germany	0	0	1	1	0	1	0	X	3
Sweden	1	2	0	0	2	0	3	X	8

==== Wednesday, April 20 ====
Draw 21 14:30

Sheet A	1	2	3	4	5	6	7	8	Final
Austria	5	3	0	3	0	2	X	X	13
Slovenia	0	0	3	0	1	0	X	X	4

Sheet B	1	2	3	4	5	6	7	8	Final
Germany	3	0	4	0	0	0	1	0	8
Finland	0	3	0	2	1	1	0	2	9

Sheet E	1	2	3	4	5	6	7	8	Final
Sweden	0	0	1	0	2	1	0	X	4
Lithuania	1	3	0	2	0	0	4	X	10

==== Thursday, April 21 ====
Draw 25 11:15

Sheet D	1	2	3	4	5	6	7	8	Final
Slovenia	4	0	0	1	0	3	0	X	8
Finland	0	5	2	0	1	0	4	X	12

Draw 26 14:30

Sheet A	1	2	3	4	5	6	7	8	9	Final
Lithuania	0	2	1	0	1	0	1	1	1	7
Germany	2	0	0	1	0	3	0	0	0	6

Sheet B	1	2	3	4	5	6	7	8	Final
South Korea	1	0	3	0	2	1	2	X	9
Austria	0	3	0	2	0	0	0	X	5

=== Group C ===
==== Saturday, April 16 ====
Draw 2 16:00

Sheet B	1	2	3	4	5	6	7	8	Final
Norway	3	1	1	1	0	3	2	X	11
Turkey	0	0	0	0	1	0	0	X	1

Sheet C	1	2	3	4	5	6	7	8	Final
Japan	1	0	3	2	0	1	0	X	7
Kazakhstan	0	1	0	0	1	0	2	X	4

Sheet E	1	2	3	4	5	6	7	8	Final
Romania	0	0	0	1	1	0	0	X	2
England	3	3	1	0	0	1	1	X	9

==== Sunday, April 17 ====
Draw 4 8:00

Sheet D	1	2	3	4	5	6	7	8	Final
Luxembourg	0	0	0	1	0	0	1	X	2
England	1	3	1	0	4	2	0	X	11

Draw 6 14:30

Sheet A	1	2	3	4	5	6	7	8	Final
Norway	0	5	0	1	0	3	1	X	10
Japan	1	0	1	0	2	0	0	X	4

Sheet C	1	2	3	4	5	6	7	8	Final
Turkey	3	1	2	1	0	4	0	X	11
Romania	0	0	0	0	5	0	2	X	7

==== Monday, April 18 ====
Draw 10 11:15

Sheet B	1	2	3	4	5	6	7	8	Final
Luxembourg	0	0	0	0	1	0	X	X	1
Norway	3	3	2	2	0	4	X	X	14

Sheet E	1	2	3	4	5	6	7	8	Final
Turkey	2	0	1	0	1	1	2	0	7
Japan	0	3	0	1	0	0	0	2	6

Draw 11 14:30

Sheet B	1	2	3	4	5	6	7	8	Final
England	2	1	0	2	1	2	1	X	9
Kazakhstan	0	0	2	0	0	0	0	X	2

Draw 13 21:00

Sheet C	1	2	3	4	5	6	7	8	Final
England	0	2	0	1	0	0	1	X	4
Norway	3	0	1	0	4	1	0	X	9

Sheet D	1	2	3	4	5	6	7	8	Final
Kazakhstan	1	1	1	0	0	0	0	X	3
Turkey	0	0	0	2	2	2	2	X	8

Sheet E	1	2	3	4	5	6	7	8	Final
Luxembourg	0	2	3	2	0	0	1	X	8
Romania	1	0	0	0	1	1	0	X	3

==== Tuesday, April 19 ====
Draw 16 14:30

Sheet C	1	2	3	4	5	6	7	8	Final
Kazakhstan	0	2	0	1	0	1	0	X	4
Luxembourg	2	0	3	0	2	0	4	X	11

Draw 17 17:45

Sheet A	1	2	3	4	5	6	7	8	Final
Japan	0	1	0	0	1	0	0	X	2
England	5	0	1	1	0	2	1	X	10

Sheet D	1	2	3	4	5	6	7	8	Final
Norway	2	0	1	1	0	1	1	X	6
Romania	0	1	0	0	1	0	0	X	2

==== Wednesday, April 20 ====
Draw 19 8:00

Sheet A	1	2	3	4	5	6	7	8	Final
Turkey	4	2	0	1	0	2	0	X	9
Luxembourg	0	0	2	0	1	0	1	X	4

Sheet B	1	2	3	4	5	6	7	8	Final
Romania	1	0	0	0	1	1	0	0	3
Japan	0	1	1	1	0	0	2	1	6

Sheet E	1	2	3	4	5	6	7	8	Final
Kazakhstan	0	0	0	0	0	0	X	X	0
Norway	3	2	1	1	3	2	X	X	12

==== Thursday, April 21 ====
Draw 24 8:00

Sheet A	1	2	3	4	5	6	7	8	Final
Romania	0	4	0	3	1	3	1	X	12
Kazakhstan	1	0	3	0	0	0	0	X	4

Sheet D	1	2	3	4	5	6	7	8	Final
Japan	1	0	1	2	1	1	1	X	7
Luxembourg	0	1	0	0	0	0	0	X	1

Draw 25 11:15

Sheet A	1	2	3	4	5	6	7	8	Final
England	0	3	1	3	0	1	0	X	8
Turkey	0	0	0	0	1	0	1	X	2

=== Group D ===
==== Sunday, April 17 ====
Draw 4 8:00

Sheet B	1	2	3	4	5	6	7	8	Final
Serbia	0	0	0	0	2	0	1	X	3
Australia	1	2	3	1	0	3	0	X	10

Sheet C	1	2	3	4	5	6	7	8	Final
France	1	0	0	0	1	1	0	X	3
Canada	0	3	1	2	0	0	3	X	9

Draw 5 11:15

Sheet E	1	2	3	4	5	6	7	8	Final
China	4	0	1	0	1	2	X	X	8
Italy	0	1	0	1	0	0	X	X	2

Draw 7 17:45

Sheet A	1	2	3	4	5	6	7	8	Final
Serbia	0	0	0	1	0	1	0	0	2
France	2	1	1	0	2	0	2	1	9

Sheet D	1	2	3	4	5	6	7	8	Final
Italy	0	0	3	1	1	0	1	0	6
Ireland	2	1	0	0	0	3	0	3	9

==== Monday, April 18 ====
Draw 9 8:00

Sheet C	1	2	3	4	5	6	7	8	Final
Australia	0	0	0	1	0	1	X	X	2
China	5	3	1	0	3	0	X	X	12

Draw 10 11:15

Sheet C	1	2	3	4	5	6	7	8	Final
Canada	0	2	2	0	3	0	1	X	8
Ireland	1	0	0	1	0	1	0	X	3

Draw 11 14:30

Sheet A	1	2	3	4	5	6	7	8	Final
France	0	1	0	0	0	1	0	0	2
Italy	2	0	1	2	1	0	1	3	10

Sheet D	1	2	3	4	5	6	7	8	Final
Serbia	0	0	0	0	0	0	X	X	0
China	3	5	1	2	2	1	X	X	14

==== Tuesday, April 19 ====
Draw 14 8:00

Sheet B	1	2	3	4	5	6	7	8	Final
Italy	2	0	0	0	2	0	1	X	5
Canada	0	1	2	2	0	4	0	X	9

Draw 16 14:30

Sheet A	1	2	3	4	5	6	7	8	Final
Australia	1	0	1	0	1	0	1	X	4
Ireland	0	2	0	3	0	4	0	X	9

Sheet B	1	2	3	4	5	6	7	8	Final
China	0	5	3	1	0	1	0	X	10
France	2	0	0	0	2	0	1	X	5

Sheet E	1	2	3	4	5	6	7	8	Final
Canada	5	2	2	2	1	2	X	X	14
Serbia	0	0	0	0	0	0	X	X	0

Draw 18 21:00

Sheet B	1	2	3	4	5	6	7	8	Final
Ireland	1	2	2	2	1	0	3	X	11
Serbia	0	0	0	0	0	1	0	X	1

Sheet E	1	2	3	4	5	6	7	8	Final
France	2	0	0	2	0	3	1	X	8
Australia	0	2	2	0	2	0	0	X	6

==== Wednesday, April 20 ====
Draw 23 21:00

Sheet A	1	2	3	4	5	6	7	8	Final
China	0	0	1	0	1	0	X	X	2
Canada	2	2	0	5	0	3	X	X	12

Sheet B	1	2	3	4	5	6	7	8	Final
Australia	1	2	0	0	1	0	/		L
Italy	0	0	3	2	0	3			W

- Australia ran out of time.

Sheet D	1	2	3	4	5	6	7	8	Final
Ireland	1	0	2	2	0	1	0	0	6
France	0	2	0	0	1	0	1	3	7

==== Thursday, April 21 ====
Draw 26 14:30

Sheet C	1	2	3	4	5	6	7	8	Final
Italy	0	5	4	0	0	2	1	X	12
Serbia	1	0	0	1	1	0	0	X	3

Sheet D	1	2	3	4	5	6	7	8	Final
Canada	2	0	3	1	1	1	5	X	13
Australia	0	1	0	0	0	0	0	X	1

Sheet E	1	2	3	4	5	6	7	8	Final
Ireland	0	1	0	1	0	0	X	X	2
China	3	0	2	0	5	3	X	X	13

=== Group E ===
==== Saturday, April 16 ====
Draw 2 16:00

Sheet A	1	2	3	4	5	6	7	8	Final
Belarus	3	0	3	0	1	0	3	X	10
Israel	0	2	0	1	0	2	0	X	5

Draw 3 20:00

Sheet A	1	2	3	4	5	6	7	8	Final
Spain	0	1	0	1	0	1	0	2	5
Denmark	2	0	2	0	1	0	1	0	6

Sheet B	1	2	3	4	5	6	7	8	Final
New Zealand	0	0	0	2	0	1	0	X	3
United States	1	2	1	0	4	0	4	X	12

==== Sunday, April 17 ====
Draw 6 14:30

Sheet B	1	2	3	4	5	6	7	8	Final
Belarus	1	0	2	0	0	1	2	X	6
Netherlands	0	1	0	2	1	0	0	X	4

Draw 8 21:00

Sheet D	1	2	3	4	5	6	7	8	Final
United States	0	3	0	2	0	4	X	X	9
Spain	1	0	1	0	1	0	X	X	3

==== Monday, April 18 ====
Draw 9 8:00

Sheet D	1	2	3	4	5	6	7	8	Final
Denmark	0	1	3	0	4	0	2	X	10
Belarus	1	0	0	1	0	2	0	X	4

Draw 10 11:15

Sheet A	1	2	3	4	5	6	7	8	Final
Netherlands	0	1	0	0	0	0	0	X	1
United States	3	0	1	2	2	1	2	X	11

Sheet D	1	2	3	4	5	6	7	8	9	Final
Spain	2	0	3	0	0	1	0	1	0	7
New Zealand	0	2	0	2	2	0	1	0	4	11

Draw 13 21:00

Sheet A	1	2	3	4	5	6	7	8	Final
Israel	2	1	1	0	0	0	0	0	4
New Zealand	0	0	0	1	1	1	1	1	5

==== Tuesday, April 19 ====
Draw 14 8:00

Sheet E	1	2	3	4	5	6	7	8	Final
Denmark	1	0	1	0	1	0	1	X	4
United States	0	2	0	1	0	3	0	X	6

Draw 15 11:15

Sheet B	1	2	3	4	5	6	7	8	Final
Israel	1	1	0	0	0	1	0	0	3
Spain	0	0	2	1	1	0	3	2	9

Draw 17 17:45

Sheet E	1	2	3	4	5	6	7	8	Final
Netherlands	0	0	0	0	0	0	0	X	0
New Zealand	3	2	1	1	1	1	3	X	12

==== Wednesday, April 20 ====
Draw 20 11:15

Sheet C	1	2	3	4	5	6	7	8	Final
New Zealand	0	2	0	1	0	0	1	1	5
Denmark	1	0	1	0	1	1	0	0	4

Sheet D	1	2	3	4	5	6	7	8	Final
Israel	2	2	0	4	0	1	1	X	10
Netherlands	0	0	1	0	3	0	0	X	4

Draw 21 14:30

Sheet C	1	2	3	4	5	6	7	8	Final
United States	1	1	1	1	0	0	4	0	8
Belarus	0	0	0	0	3	1	0	2	6

Draw 22 17:45

Sheet C	1	2	3	4	5	6	7	8	Final
Denmark	4	1	1	2	0	1	1	X	10
Israel	0	0	0	0	1	0	0	X	1

Draw 23 21:00

Sheet C	1	2	3	4	5	6	7	8	Final
Spain	2	0	1	2	0	1	0	3	9
Netherlands	0	1	0	0	1	0	3	0	5

Sheet E	1	2	3	4	5	6	7	8	Final
New Zealand	0	1	1	0	0	4	2	1	9
Belarus	2	0	0	2	1	0	0	0	5

==== Thursday, April 21 ====
Draw 24 8:00

Sheet E	1	2	3	4	5	6	7	8	Final
United States	0	0	2	2	1	0	1	0	6
Israel	1	1	0	0	0	1	0	1	4

Draw 25 11:15

Sheet B	1	2	3	4	5	6	7	8	9	Final
Netherlands	1	0	0	0	4	1	0	0	0	6
Denmark	0	2	1	1	0	0	1	1	2	8

Sheet E	1	2	3	4	5	6	7	8	Final
Belarus	0	0	0	0	2	0	2	X	4
Spain	3	2	2	1	0	2	0	X	10

=== Group F ===
==== Saturday, April 16 ====
Draw 1 12:00

Sheet A	1	2	3	4	5	6	7	8	9	Final
Russia	0	0	3	0	3	0	2	0	0	8
Scotland	1	2	0	1	0	2	0	2	1	9

Sheet D	1	2	3	4	5	6	7	8	9	Final
Wales	0	0	1	3	0	1	0	2	0	7
Brazil	1	1	0	0	3	0	2	0	1	8

Draw 2 16:00

Sheet D	1	2	3	4	5	6	7	8	Final
Estonia	1	2	3	0	1	0	5	X	12
Czech Republic	0	0	0	2	0	1	0	X	3

==== Sunday, April 17 ====
Draw 4 8:00

Sheet A	1	2	3	4	5	6	7	8	Final
Qatar	1	0	0	0	1	0	0	X	2
Wales	0	3	1	3	0	4	2	X	13

Draw 5 11:15

Sheet B	1	2	3	4	5	6	7	8	Final
Brazil	4	0	0	0	0	0	1	X	5
Estonia	0	1	0	3	3	2	0	X	9

Draw 6 14:30

Sheet E	1	2	3	4	5	6	7	8	Final
Scotland	0	0	1	0	0	1	X	X	2
Czech Republic	2	1	0	2	3	0	X	X	8

Draw 7 17:45

Sheet E	1	2	3	4	5	6	7	8	Final
Russia	6	3	4	5	2	6	X	X	26
Qatar	0	0	0	0	0	0	X	X	0

==== Monday, April 18 ====
Draw 9 8:00

Sheet A	1	2	3	4	5	6	7	8	Final
Czech Republic	0	1	3	0	1	1	0	1	7
Brazil	2	0	0	3	0	0	1	0	6

Draw 11 14:30

Sheet C	1	2	3	4	5	6	7	8	Final
Czech Republic	0	4	4	0	3	0	2	X	13
Wales	1	0	0	1	0	2	0	X	4

Draw 12 17:45

Sheet A	1	2	3	4	5	6	7	8	Final
Estonia	1	1	0	1	1	0	1	0	5
Russia	0	0	3	0	0	2	0	1	6

Sheet E	1	2	3	4	5	6	7	8	Final
Qatar	0	1	0	0	0	1	X	X	2
Brazil	6	0	5	2	1	0	X	X	14

Draw 13 21:00

Sheet B	1	2	3	4	5	6	7	8	Final
Wales	1	0	1	0	2	0	0	X	4
Scotland	0	1	0	1	0	4	2	X	8

==== Tuesday, April 19 ====
Draw 15 11:15

Sheet D	1	2	3	4	5	6	7	8	Final
Czech Republic	2	3	4	3	2	3	X	X	17
Qatar	0	0	0	0	0	0	X	X	0

Draw 17 17:45

Sheet B	1	2	3	4	5	6	7	8	Final
Scotland	5	4	3	3	4	X	X	X	19
Qatar	0	0	0	0	0	X	X	X	0

Sheet C	1	2	3	4	5	6	7	8	Final
Wales	0	1	0	3	0	0	0	X	4
Russia	3	0	2	0	1	1	2	X	9

==== Wednesday, April 20 ====
Draw 19 8:00

Sheet D	1	2	3	4	5	6	7	8	Final
Scotland	0	1	0	2	0	2	2	0	7
Estonia	1	0	2	0	4	0	0	2	9

Draw 21 14:30

Sheet D	1	2	3	4	5	6	7	8	Final
Brazil	1	0	0	0	1	0	0	X	2
Russia	0	2	1	2	0	2	1	X	8

Draw 22 17:45

Sheet E	1	2	3	4	5	6	7	8	Final
Estonia	2	0	0	3	0	3	0	2	10
Wales	0	3	1	0	1	0	4	0	9

==== Thursday, April 21 ====
Draw 24 8:00

Sheet B	1	2	3	4	5	6	7	8	Final
Russia	6	0	1	0	0	1	0	0	8
Czech Republic	0	2	0	2	1	0	1	1	7

Sheet C	1	2	3	4	5	6	7	8	Final
Qatar	0	0	0	0	0	0	X	X	0
Estonia	3	3	2	1	3	3	X	X	15

Draw 25 11:15

Sheet C	1	2	3	4	5	6	7	8	Final
Brazil	0	1	0	1	0	0	X	X	2
Scotland	1	0	4	0	4	3	X	X	12

== Tiebreakers ==
Thursday, April 21, 17:45

Sheet A	1	2	3	4	5	6	7	8	Final
Italy	0	5	0	1	0	0	1	0	7
Ireland	1	0	3	0	1	1	0	2	8

Sheet B	1	2	3	4	5	6	7	8	Final
Bulgaria	0	2	1	1	0	1	0	0	5
Poland	1	0	0	0	1	0	1	1	4

Sheet E	1	2	3	4	5	6	7	8	9	Final
Czech Republic	0	1	0	1	0	2	0	1	0	5
Scotland	1	0	1	0	2	0	1	0	1	6

== Playoffs ==
Qualification Game 1
C3	Turkey	5
D3	Ireland	7

Qualification Game 2
E3	Denmark	7
A3	Bulgaria	4

Round of 16
F1	Russia	10
A2	Slovakia	2
B1	Finland	10
D3	Ireland	5
E1	United States	7
B3	Austria	2
B2	South Korea	5
C2	England	7
A1	Hungary	5
F3	Scotland	6
D1	Canada	12
E2	New Zealand	2
C1	Norway	7
F2	Estonia	8
D2	China	12
E3	Denmark	1

Quarterfinals
F1	Russia	8
B1	Finland	7
E1	United States	12
C2	England	6
F3	Scotland	6
D1	Canada	5
F2	Estonia	5
D2	China	8

Semi finals
F1	Russia	8
E1	United States	6
F3	Scotland	5
D2	China	7

Gold Medal Game
F1	Russia	7
D2	China	5

Bronze Medal Game
E1	United States	9
F3	Scotland	7

5th-8th Semi
B1	Finland	5
D1	Canada	10
F2	Estonia	10
C2	England	8

5 v 6
D1	Canada	8
F2	Estonia	2

7 v 8
B1	Finland	6
C2	England	3

9th-16th Quarter
A1	Hungary	8
D3	Ireland	10
A2	Slovakia	8
B2	South Korea	5
E3	Denmark	3
B3	Austria	6
C1	Norway	8
E2	New Zealand	3

9th-12th Semi
D3	Ireland	2
A2	Slovakia	12
B3	Austria	3
C1	Norway	8

9 v 10
A2	Slovakia	2
C1	Norway	8

11 v 12
D3	Ireland	6
B3	Austria	9

=== Qualification Games ===
Thursday, April 21, 21:00

Team	1	2	3	4	5	6	7	8	9	Final
Turkey	0	1	0	0	1	1	0	2	0	5
Ireland	1	0	1	1	0	0	2	0	2	7

Team	1	2	3	4	5	6	7	8	Final
Denmark	1	0	3	0	0	2	1	0	7
Bulgaria	0	1	0	1	1	0	0	1	4

=== Round of 16 ===
Friday, April 22, 9:00

Team	1	2	3	4	5	6	7	8	Final
Canada	4	0	2	0	3	2	1	X	12
New Zealand	0	1	0	1	0	0	0	X	2

Team	1	2	3	4	5	6	7	8	Final
Russia	3	0	2	2	0	3	X	X	10
Slovakia	0	1	0	0	1	0	X	X	2

Team	1	2	3	4	5	6	7	8	Final
United States	1	0	2	0	2	1	1	X	7
Austria	0	1	0	1	0	0	0	X	2

Team	1	2	3	4	5	6	7	8	Final
Norway	1	0	1	0	2	3	0	0	7
Estonia	0	3	0	1	0	0	3	1	8

Friday, April 22, 12:30

Team	1	2	3	4	5	6	7	8	Final
Hungary	1	0	2	1	0	1	0	0	5
Scotland	0	2	0	0	1	0	2	1	6

Team	1	2	3	4	5	6	7	8	Final
Finland	1	1	0	3	0	0	5	X	10
Ireland	0	0	3	0	1	1	0	X	5

Team	1	2	3	4	5	6	7	8	Final
China	4	1	2	0	4	1	X	X	12
Denmark	0	0	0	1	0	0	X	X	1

Team	1	2	3	4	5	6	7	8	Final
South Korea	1	0	0	3	0	0	1	X	5
England	0	2	2	0	2	1	0	X	7

=== 9th-16th Quarterfinals ===
Friday, April 22, 16:00

Team	1	2	3	4	5	6	7	8	Final
Slovakia	4	0	1	0	1	1	0	1	8
South Korea	0	1	0	1	0	0	3	0	5

Team	1	2	3	4	5	6	7	8	Final
Hungary	1	0	0	3	2	0	2	0	8
Ireland	0	2	1	0	0	5	0	2	10

Team	1	2	3	4	5	6	7	8	Final
Norway	2	0	3	1	0	2	0	X	8
New Zealand	0	1	0	0	1	0	1	X	3

Team	1	2	3	4	5	6	7	8	Final
Denmark	0	0	1	0	0	1	1	0	3
Austria	1	1	0	1	2	0	0	1	6

=== Quarterfinals ===
Friday, April 22, 19:30

Team	1	2	3	4	5	6	7	8	Final
Russia	1	0	3	2	0	1	1	0	8
Finland	0	3	0	0	2	0	0	2	7

Team	1	2	3	4	5	6	7	8	Final
Estonia	1	0	1	0	0	3	0	0	5
China	0	2	0	2	2	0	1	1	8

Team	1	2	3	4	5	6	7	8	Final
Scotland	1	0	1	1	0	2	0	1	6
Canada	0	1	0	0	3	0	1	0	5

Team	1	2	3	4	5	6	7	8	Final
United States	2	3	2	0	3	2	0	X	12
England	0	0	0	4	0	0	2	X	6

=== 9th-12th Semifinals ===
Saturday, April 23, 8:30

Team	1	2	3	4	5	6	7	8	Final
Ireland	0	0	1	0	0	1	0	X	2
Slovakia	2	2	0	2	2	0	4	X	12

Team	1	2	3	4	5	6	7	8	Final
Austria	1	0	0	1	0	1	0	X	3
Norway	0	3	1	0	2	0	2	X	8

=== 11 v 12 ===
Saturday, April 23, 12:00

Team	1	2	3	4	5	6	7	8	Final
Ireland	0	3	1	0	0	2	0	X	6
Austria	2	0	0	1	1	0	5	X	9

=== 5th-8th Semifinals ===
Saturday, April 23, 12:00

Team	1	2	3	4	5	6	7	8	Final
Finland	2	0	0	2	0	1	0	X	5
Canada	0	4	1	0	3	0	2	X	10

Team	1	2	3	4	5	6	7	8	Final
Estonia	4	0	2	0	3	0	1	0	10
England	0	1	0	2	0	2	0	3	8

=== Semifinals ===
Saturday, April 23, 12:00

Team	1	2	3	4	5	6	7	8	Final
United States	0	3	0	1	0	0	2	0	6
Russia	1	0	1	0	4	1	0	1	8

Team	1	2	3	4	5	6	7	8	Final
Scotland	0	3	0	0	0	0	0	2	5
China	1	0	2	1	1	1	1	0	7

=== 9 v 10 ===
Saturday, April 23, 16:00

Team	1	2	3	4	5	6	7	8	Final
Slovakia	0	0	0	1	0	1	X	X	2
Norway	2	1	1	0	4	0	X	X	8

=== 7 v 8 ===
Saturday, April 23, 16:00

Team	1	2	3	4	5	6	7	8	Final
Finland	1	1	1	1	1	1	0	X	6
England	0	0	0	0	0	0	3	X	3

=== 5 v 6 ===
Saturday, April 23, 16:00

Team	1	2	3	4	5	6	7	8	Final
Canada	1	3	0	2	1	1	X	X	8
Estonia	0	0	2	0	0	0	X	X	2

=== Bronze medal game ===
Saturday, April 23, 16:00

Team	1	2	3	4	5	6	7	8	Final
United States	1	0	4	2	0	0	1	1	9
Scotland	0	3	0	0	3	1	0	0	7

=== Gold medal game ===
Saturday, April 23, 16:00

Team	1	2	3	4	5	6	7	8	Final
Russia	0	3	0	2	0	1	0	1	7
China	1	0	1	0	1	0	2	0	5
