= Polina Petrova =

Belarusian female curler

- Curler
- Born: 1 April 1971 (age 55); Minsk, Belarus

Team
- Mixed doubles partner: Mikalai Kryshtopa

Curling career
- World Mixed Doubles Championship: 1 (2016)
- European Championship: 1 (2018)
- Other appearances: World Mixed Championship: 2 (2015, 2017)
Medal record
Curling
Representing Belarus

Polina Petrova (Belarusian: Поли́на Пятро́ва, Russian: Поли́на Петро́ва; born 1 April 1971 in Minsk) is a Belarusian female curler.

She played on two World Mixed Championships (2015, 2017), one World Mixed Doubles Championship (2016) and one European Championship (C division, 2018).

== Achievements ==
- Belarusian Mixed Curling Championship: gold (2017), bronze (2016, 2018).
- Belarusian Mixed Doubles Curling Championship: gold (2015), silver (2019).

== Teams and events ==
=== Women's ===
Season	Skip	Third	Second	Lead	Alternate	Coach	Events
2017–18	Irina Belko	Polina Petrova	Tatsiana Tarsunova	Vera Tarsunova			
2017–18	Daria Bogatova	Natalia Rudnitskaya	Ekaterina Kirillova	Polina Petrova	Vera Dosava	Vasily Telezhkin	ECC-C 2018 (5th)
2018–19	Irina Belko	Daria Bogatova	Polina Petrova	Aija Barzdaine			

=== Mixed ===
Season	Skip	Third	Second	Lead	Events
2015–16	Pavel Petrov	Ekaterina Kirillova	Dmitry Kirillov	Polina Petrova	WMxCC 2015 (31st)
2015–16	Pavel Petrov	Polina Petrova	Dmitry Rudnitski	Natalia Rudnitskaya	BMxCC 2016 (bronze)
2016–17	Pavel Petrov	Polina Petrova	Mikalai Kryshtopa	Ewgeniya Orlis	BMxCC 2017 (gold)
2017–18	Pavel Petrov	Polina Petrova	Mikalai Kryshtopa	Ewgeniya Orlis	WMxCC 2017 (18th); BMxCC 2018 (bronze)

=== Mixed doubles ===
Season	Male	Female	Coach	Events
2015–16	Pavel Petrov	Polina Petrova	Aleksandr Orlov	BMDCC 2015 (gold); WMDCC 2016 (26th)
2016–17	Pavel Petrov	Polina Petrova		BMDCC 2016 (4th)
2018–19	Mikalai Kryshtopa	Polina Petrova		BMDCC 2019 (silver)
