= 2015 World Mixed Curling Championship =

- Host city: Bern, Switzerland
- Arena: Curling Bahn Allmend
- Dates: September 12–19
- Winner: Norway
- Curling club: Oppdal CC
- Skip: Steffen Walstad
- Third: Julie Molnar
- Second: Sander Rølvåg
- Lead: Pia Trulsen
- Coach: Ole Ingvaldsen
- Finalist: Sweden

The 2015 World Mixed Curling Championship was held from September 12 to 19 at the Curling Bahn Allmend in Bern, Switzerland.

== Teams ==
=== Group A ===
Belgium	Denmark	France	Ireland	Italy
Skip: Stefan Van Dijck; Third: Sarah Megens; Second: Christophe Stessens; Lead: Fam Van Den Bosch	Skip: Mikael Qvist; Third: Trine Qvist; Second: Are Solberg; Lead: Mathilde Halse	Skip: Thierry Mercier; Third: Sandrine Morand; Second: Romain Borini; Lead: Catherine Emberger	Skip: John Jo Kenny; Third: Marie O'Kane; Second: Tony Tierney; Lead: Jen Ward	Fourth: Fabio Sola; Skip: Denise Pimpini; Second: Alberto Pimpini; Lead: Sara Aliberti
Lithuania	Romania	Slovakia	Sweden	
Skip: Virginija Paulauskaitė; Third: Matas Cepulis; Second: Lina Januleviciute; Lead: Augustas Cepla	Skip: Attila Gall; Third: Iulia Traila; Second: Paul Marin; Lead: Oana Marin	Fourth: Gabriela Kajanova; Third: Rene Petko; Second: Silvia Sykorova; Skip: Pavel Kocian	Skip: Rasmus Wranå; Third: Zandra Flyg; Second: Joakim Flyg; Lead: Johanna Heldin	

=== Group B ===
Australia	Canada	Finland	Germany	Israel
Skip: Ian Palangio; Third: Kim Forge; Second: Steve Johns; Lead: Anne Powell	Swift Current CC, Swift Current, SK Skip: Max Kirkpatrick; Third: Jolene Campbell; Second: Chris Haichert; Lead: Teejay Haichert	Skip: Tomi Rantamaki; Third: Anne Malmi; Second: Iikko Santti; Lead: Tiina Suuripaa	Skip: Andy Kapp; Third: Petra Tschetsch; Second: Holger Höhne; Lead: Pia-Lisa Schöll	Fourth: Jeffrey Lutz; Skip: Elana Sone; Second: Larry Sidney; Lead: Andrea Stark
Latvia	Norway	Spain	Wales	
Skip: Aldis Abrickis; Third: Ineta Maca; Second: Andris Bremanis; Lead: Rasa Lubarte	Skip: Steffen Walstad; Third: Julie Molnar; Second: Sander Rølvåg; Lead: Pia Trulsen	Skip: Sergio Vez; Third: Oihane Otaegi; Second: Mikel Unanue; Lead: Leire Otaegi	Skip: Adrian Meikle; Third: Dawn Watson; Second: Andrew Tanner; Lead: Laura Beever	

=== Group C ===
China	Czech Republic	England	Kazakhstan	New Zealand
Fourth: Ji Yansong; Third: Zheng Chunmei; Second: Guo Wenli; Skip: Gao Xuesong	Skip: Tomas Valek; Third: Kamila Mulacova; Second: Martin Mulac; Lead: Helena Hajkova	Skip: Arthur Bates; Third: Lana Watson; Second: Harry Mallows; Lead: Sara Jahodova	Skip: Viktor Kim; Third: Olga Ten; Second: Abylaikhan Zhuzbay; Lead: Nargiz Issayeva	Skip: David Watt; Third: Thivya Jeyaranjan; Second: Kieran Ford; Lead: Waverley Taylor
Poland	Russia	Slovenia	Switzerland	
Skip: Marta Szeliga-Frynia; Third: Maciej Cesarz; Second: Adela Walczak; Lead: Pawel Frynia	Fourth: Uliana Vasileva; Skip: Alexey Tselousov; Second: Ekaterina Kuzmina; Lead: Evgeny Klimov	Skip: Lan Zagar; Third: Nina Kremzar; Second: Marko Harb; Lead: Spela Bizjan	Fourth: Romano Meier; Third: Briar Hürlimann; Skip: Yannick Schwaller; Lead: Céline Koller	

=== Group D ===
Austria	Belarus	Brazil	Estonia	Hungary
Skip: Karina Toth; Third: Mathias Genner; Second: Constanze Ocker; Lead: Martin Reichel	Skip: Pavel Petrov; Third: Ekaterina Kirillova; Second: Dmitry Kirillov; Lead: Polina Petrova	Skip: Marcelo Mello; Third: Luciana Barrella; Second: Sergio Mitsuo Vilela; Lead: Isis Oliveira	Skip: Martin Lill; Third: Kristiine Lill; Second: Siim Sildnik; Lead: Kerli Laidsalu	Skip: Gyorgy Nagy; Third: Ildikó Szekeres; Second: Zsolt Kiss; Lead: Agnes Szentannai
Japan	Scotland	Turkey	United States	
Skip: Hiroaki Kashiwagi; Third: Natsuki Saito; Second: Fukuhiro Ohno; Lead: Kotomi Ishizaki	Skip: Cameron Bryce; Third: Katie Murray; Second: Bobby Lammie; Lead: Sophie Jackson	Skip: Alican Karataş; Third: Dilşat Yıldız; Second: Bilal Ömer Çakır; Lead: Semiha Konuksever	Granite CC, Seattle, WA Skip: Brady Clark; Third: Cristin Clark; Second: Sean Beighton; Lead: Jillian Walker	

== Round robin standings ==
Final Round Robin Standings

Key
Teams to Playoffs
Teams to Tiebreaker

Group A	Skip	W	L
Sweden	Rasmus Wranå	7	1
Italy	Denise Pimpini	6	2
Denmark	Mikael Qvist	5	3
France	Thierry Mercier	5	3
Ireland	John Jo Kenny	4	4
Slovakia	Pavel Kocian	4	4
Belgium	Stefan Van Dijck	2	6
Lithuania	Virginija Paulauskaitė	2	6
Romania	Attila Gall	1	7

Group B	Skip	W	L
Germany	Andy Kapp	6	2
Norway	Steffen Walstad	6	2
Canada	Max Kirkpatrick	6	2
Finland	Tomi Rantamaki	5	3
Latvia	Aldis Abrickis	4	4
Spain	Sergio Vez	3	5
Wales	Adrian Meikle	3	5
Australia	Ian Palangio	2	6
Israel	Elana Sone	1	7

Group C	Skip	W	L
Russia	Alexey Tselousov	7	1
China	Gao Xuesong	7	1
Switzerland	Yannick Schwaller	7	1
Poland	Marta Szeliga-Frynia	4	4
Czech Republic	Tomas Valek	4	4
New Zealand	David Watt	3	5
Slovenia	Lan Zagar	3	5
England	Arthur Bates	1	7
Kazakhstan	Viktor Kim	0	8

Group D	Skip	W	L
United States	Brady Clark	7	1
Scotland	Cameron Bryce	7	1
Hungary	Gyorgy Nagy	6	2
Turkey	Alican Karataş	4	4
Estonia	Martin Lill	4	4
Japan	Hiroaki Kashiwagi	3	5
Austria	Karina Toth	3	5
Belarus	Pavel Petrov	2	6
Brazil	Marcelo Mello	0	8

== Round robin results ==
All draw times are listed in Central European Summer Time (UTC+2).

=== Group A ===
==== Saturday, September 12 ====
Draw 1 8:00

Sheet B	1	2	3	4	5	6	7	8	Final
France (Mercier)	0	2	0	0	3	4	1	X	10
Romania (Gall)	2	0	0	0	0	0	0	X	2

Sheet C	1	2	3	4	5	6	7	8	Final
Slovakia (Kocian)	1	1	1	1	0	2	0	X	6
Belgium (Van Dijck)	0	0	0	0	1	0	1	X	2

Sheet D	1	2	3	4	5	6	7	8	Final
Italy (Pimpini)	0	1	0	1	0	0	1	X	3
Sweden (Wranå)	0	0	2	0	3	1	0	X	6

Sheet F	1	2	3	4	5	6	7	8	Final
Ireland (Kenny)	0	1	0	0	2	0	X	X	3
Denmark (Qvist)	2	0	4	3	0	2	X	X	11

Draw 3 16:00

Sheet A	1	2	3	4	5	6	7	8	Final
Ireland (Kenny)	3	2	1	0	2	0	3	X	11
Lithuania (Paulauskaitė)	0	0	0	3	0	2	0	X	5

Sheet E	1	2	3	4	5	6	7	8	Final
Sweden (Wranå)	1	0	0	3	3	0	2	X	9
Belgium (Van Dijck)	0	1	1	0	0	1	0	X	3

==== Sunday, September 13 ====
Draw 5 8:00

Sheet A	1	2	3	4	5	6	7	8	Final
Belgium (Van Dijck)	1	0	1	1	0	0	0	X	3
Italy (Pimpini)	0	1	0	0	2	1	1	X	5

Sheet C	1	2	3	4	5	6	7	8	Final
Lithuania (Paulauskaitė)	0	3	0	1	0	1	0	1	6
Romania (Gall)	2	0	1	0	1	0	1	0	5

Sheet F	1	2	3	4	5	6	7	8	Final
Sweden (Wranå)	1	2	0	0	2	0	1	1	7
Slovakia (Kocian)	0	0	1	1	0	3	0	0	5

Draw 7 16:00

Sheet B	1	2	3	4	5	6	7	8	9	Final
Lithuania (Paulauskaitė)	1	0	1	0	0	1	3	1	1	8
Denmark (Qvist)	0	2	0	4	1	0	0	0	0	7

Sheet D	1	2	3	4	5	6	7	8	Final
Romania (Gall)	0	0	0	3	0	0	X	X	3
Ireland (Kenny)	2	2	1	0	4	1	X	X	10

Sheet E	1	2	3	4	5	6	7	8	9	Final
France (Mercier)	0	2	1	0	1	0	2	0	0	6
Italy (Pimpini)	1	0	0	2	0	1	0	2	1	7

==== Monday, September 14 ====
Draw 9 8:00

Sheet A	1	2	3	4	5	6	7	8	Final
Lithuania (Paulauskaitė)	0	1	0	0	0	2	X	X	3
Sweden (Wranå)	2	0	5	0	0	0	X	X	7

Sheet B	1	2	3	4	5	6	7	8	Final
Ireland (Kenny)	0	2	1	0	0	0	1	0	4
Slovakia (Kocian)	1	0	0	1	1	2	0	1	6

Sheet D	1	2	3	4	5	6	7	8	Final
France (Mercier)	3	2	1	2	0	3	X	X	11
Belgium (Van Dijck)	0	0	0	0	1	0	X	X	1

Sheet E	1	2	3	4	5	6	7	8	Final
Romania (Gall)	0	0	0	1	0	0	1	X	2
Denmark (Qvist)	1	1	3	0	1	0	0	X	6

Draw 11 16:00

Sheet C	1	2	3	4	5	6	7	8	Final
Denmark (Qvist)	2	1	1	0	0	1	0	X	5
France (Mercier)	0	0	0	1	1	0	0	X	2

Sheet F	1	2	3	4	5	6	7	8	Final
Slovakia (Kocian)	1	0	4	0	1	0	2	X	8
Italy (Pimpini)	0	1	0	1	0	1	0	X	3

==== Tuesday, September 15 ====
Draw 14 12:00

Sheet A	1	2	3	4	5	6	7	8	Final
France (Mercier)	0	0	2	0	2	0	1	1	6
Ireland (Kenny)	0	2	0	2	0	3	0	0	7

Sheet B	1	2	3	4	5	6	7	8	Final
Italy (Pimpini)	3	0	1	0	4	0	0	X	8
Lithuania (Paulauskaitė)	0	1	0	1	0	0	1	X	3

Sheet C	1	2	3	4	5	6	7	8	Final
Romania (Gall)	0	1	1	2	1	1	0	X	6
Slovakia (Kocian)	1	0	0	0	0	0	2	X	3

Sheet F	1	2	3	4	5	6	7	8	Final
Denmark (Qvist)	0	0	1	1	0	1	0	2	5
Belgium (Van Dijck)	0	1	0	0	2	0	1	0	4

Draw 16 20:00

Sheet D	1	2	3	4	5	6	7	8	Final
Slovakia (Kocian)	0	0	0	1	0	2	0	1	4
France (Mercier)	2	1	0	0	2	0	1	0	6

Sheet E	1	2	3	4	5	6	7	8	Final
Ireland (Kenny)	0	0	1	1	0	1	2	0	5
Sweden (Wranå)	1	2	0	0	1	0	0	2	6

==== Wednesday, September 16 ====
Draw 18 12:00

Sheet D	1	2	3	4	5	6	7	8	Final
Denmark (Qvist)	0	2	0	0	0	0	0	0	2
Italy (Pimpini)	0	0	0	0	1	0	1	1	3

Sheet E	1	2	3	4	5	6	7	8	Final
Slovakia (Kocian)	0	0	2	2	0	0	4	X	8
Lithuania (Paulauskaitė)	1	1	0	0	1	0	0	X	3

Draw 20 20:00

Sheet A	1	2	3	4	5	6	7	8	Final
Italy (Pimpini)	0	3	0	1	1	0	1	X	6
Romania (Gall)	2	0	1	0	0	1	0	X	4

Sheet B	1	2	3	4	5	6	7	8	Final
Belgium (Van Dijck)	0	0	0	0	0	1	1	X	2
Ireland (Kenny)	2	1	1	1	1	0	0	X	6

Sheet C	1	2	3	4	5	6	7	8	Final
Sweden (Wranå)	1	0	4	1	0	0	0	X	6
Denmark (Qvist)	0	1	0	0	1	1	1	X	4

Sheet F	1	2	3	4	5	6	7	8	Final
Lithuania (Paulauskaitė)	2	0	0	1	0	1	0	X	4
France (Mercier)	0	0	1	0	1	0	4	X	6

==== Thursday, September 17 ====
Draw 22 12:00

Sheet B	1	2	3	4	5	6	7	8	Final
Sweden (Wranå)	1	0	2	0	0	1	0	X	4
France (Mercier)	0	4	0	2	1	0	2	X	9

Sheet E	1	2	3	4	5	6	7	8	Final
Belgium (Van Dijck)	0	0	3	1	2	1	1	X	8
Romania (Gall)	1	1	0	0	0	0	0	X	2

Draw 24 20:00

Sheet A	1	2	3	4	5	6	7	8	Final
Denmark (Qvist)	0	2	1	1	1	0	1	X	6
Slovakia (Kocian)	1	0	0	0	0	1	0	X	2

Sheet C	1	2	3	4	5	6	7	8	Final
Italy (Pimpini)	2	0	3	0	0	3	X	X	8
Ireland (Kenny)	0	1	0	1	0	0	X	X	2

Sheet D	1	2	3	4	5	6	7	8	Final
Belgium (Van Dijck)	3	0	1	0	2	0	1	X	7
Lithuania (Paulauskaitė)	0	1	0	1	0	1	0	X	3

Sheet F	1	2	3	4	5	6	7	8	Final
Romania (Gall)	0	0	0	0	1	0	X	X	1
Sweden (Wranå)	1	2	2	1	0	4	X	X	10

=== Group B ===
==== Saturday, September 12 ====
Draw 2 12:00

Sheet B	1	2	3	4	5	6	7	8	9	Final
Spain (Vez)	3	0	2	0	0	0	2	0	0	7
Latvia (Abrickis)	0	3	0	1	0	1	0	2	1	8

Sheet C	1	2	3	4	5	6	7	8	Final
Norway (Walstad)	1	0	2	0	0	0	2	0	5
Australia (Palangio)	0	1	0	1	0	1	0	1	4

Sheet D	1	2	3	4	5	6	7	8	Final
Germany (Kapp)	2	3	2	2	0	1	0	X	10
Wales (Meikle)	0	0	0	0	1	0	1	X	2

Sheet F	1	2	3	4	5	6	7	8	Final
Finland (Rantamaki)	1	1	0	1	0	1	0	X	4
Canada (Kirkpatrick)	0	0	1	0	4	0	1	X	6

Draw 4 20:30

Sheet A	1	2	3	4	5	6	7	8	Final
Finland (Rantamaki)	2	3	1	0	1	0	2	X	9
Israel (Sone)	0	0	0	2	0	1	0	X	3

Sheet E	1	2	3	4	5	6	7	8	Final
Wales (Meikle)	0	1	0	5	3	0	X	X	9
Australia (Palangio)	0	0	1	0	0	2	X	X	3

==== Sunday, September 13 ====
Draw 6 12:00

Sheet A	1	2	3	4	5	6	7	8	Final
Australia (Palangio)	0	1	0	2	0	1	0	1	5
Germany (Kapp)	2	0	1	0	2	0	2	0	7

Sheet C	1	2	3	4	5	6	7	8	Final
Israel (Sone)	1	1	0	1	0	2	0	X	5
Latvia (Abrickis)	0	0	3	0	4	0	3	X	10

Draw 8 20:00

Sheet B	1	2	3	4	5	6	7	8	Final
Israel (Sone)	0	1	0	0	1	0	1	X	3
Canada (Kirkpatrick)	2	0	0	1	0	2	0	X	5

Sheet D	1	2	3	4	5	6	7	8	Final
Latvia (Abrickis)	0	1	0	1	0	3	0	X	5
Finland (Rantamaki)	0	0	3	0	1	0	4	X	8

Sheet E	1	2	3	4	5	6	7	8	Final
Spain (Vez)	0	0	1	0	0	1	0	X	2
Germany (Kapp)	1	0	0	2	0	0	1	X	4

Sheet F	1	2	3	4	5	6	7	8	Final
Wales (Meikle)	1	2	0	0	0	5	1	X	9
Norway (Walstad)	0	0	1	2	0	0	0	X	3

==== Monday, September 14 ====
Draw 9 8:00

Sheet C	1	2	3	4	5	6	7	8	Final
Canada (Kirkpatrick)	0	1	0	0	0	2	1	1	5
Spain (Vez)	0	0	2	3	1	0	0	0	6

Sheet E	1	2	3	4	5	6	7	8	Final
Romania (Gall)	0	0	0	1	0	0	1	X	2
Denmark (Qvist)	1	1	3	0	1	0	0	X	6

Draw 11 16:00

Sheet A	1	2	3	4	5	6	7	8	Final
Israel (Sone)	0	0	2	1	3	0	2	2	10
Wales (Meikle)	1	1	0	0	0	3	0	0	5

Sheet B	1	2	3	4	5	6	7	8	Final
Finland (Rantamaki)	0	0	2	0	3	0	1	0	6
Norway (Walstad)	1	0	0	2	0	2	0	4	9

Sheet D	1	2	3	4	5	6	7	8	Final
Spain (Vez)	0	2	0	0	4	0	0	X	6
Australia (Palangio)	1	0	1	1	0	2	4	X	9

Sheet F	1	2	3	4	5	6	7	8	Final
Slovakia (Kocian)	1	0	4	0	1	0	2	X	8
Italy (Pimpini)	0	1	0	1	0	1	0	X	3

==== Tuesday, September 15 ====
Draw 13 8:00

Sheet A	1	2	3	4	5	6	7	8	Final
Spain (Vez)	0	0	0	2	0	2	0	X	4
Finland (Rantamaki)	1	0	2	0	3	0	3	X	9

Sheet B	1	2	3	4	5	6	7	8	Final
Germany (Kapp)	0	1	0	0	2	1	2	0	6
Israel (Sone)	1	0	1	0	0	0	0	3	5

Sheet C	1	2	3	4	5	6	7	8	Final
Latvia (Abrickis)	1	0	0	1	0	1	0	X	3
Norway (Walstad)	0	1	2	0	2	0	0	X	5

Sheet F	1	2	3	4	5	6	7	8	Final
Canada (Kirkpatrick)	0	0	2	0	1	1	2	X	6
Australia (Palangio)	2	1	0	1	0	0	0	X	4

Draw 15 16:00

Sheet D	1	2	3	4	5	6	7	8	Final
Norway (Walstad)	0	0	0	4	1	1	0	1	7
Spain (Vez)	3	1	0	0	0	0	1	0	5

Sheet E	1	2	3	4	5	6	7	8	9	Final
Finland (Rantamaki)	1	0	1	0	1	0	3	0	0	6
Wales (Meikle)	0	1	0	2	0	2	0	1	2	8

==== Wednesday, September 16 ====
Draw 17 8:00

Sheet A	1	2	3	4	5	6	7	8	Final
Germany (Kapp)	1	0	1	1	2	0	0	1	6
Latvia (Abrickis)	0	1	0	0	0	1	1	0	3

Sheet B	1	2	3	4	5	6	7	8	Final
Australia (Palangio)	0	0	0	1	0	1	0	X	2
Finland (Rantamaki)	2	0	1	0	1	0	1	X	5

Sheet C	1	2	3	4	5	6	7	8	Final
Wales (Meikle)	0	1	0	1	0	1	0	X	3
Canada (Kirkpatrick)	2	0	1	0	1	0	2	X	6

Sheet F	1	2	3	4	5	6	7	8	Final
Israel (Sone)	0	1	0	1	1	1	0	X	4
Spain (Vez)	1	0	5	0	0	0	2	X	8

Draw 19 16:00

Sheet D	1	2	3	4	5	6	7	8	9	Final
Canada (Kirkpatrick)	0	1	0	1	1	0	0	1	0	4
Germany (Kapp)	0	0	2	0	0	2	0	0	1	5

Sheet E	1	2	3	4	5	6	7	8	9	Final
Norway (Walstad)	0	0	3	0	1	1	0	0	1	6
Israel (Sone)	1	1	0	2	0	0	0	1	0	5

==== Thursday, September 17 ====
Draw 21 8:00

Sheet B	1	2	3	4	5	6	7	8	Final
Wales (Meikle)	1	1	0	0	0	1	0	1	4
Spain (Vez)	0	0	0	1	3	0	1	0	5

Sheet E	1	2	3	4	5	6	7	8	Final
Australia (Palangio)	2	0	0	0	1	0	1	0	4
Latvia (Abrickis)	0	2	1	1	0	1	0	1	6

Draw 23 16:00

Sheet A	1	2	3	4	5	6	7	8	Final
Canada (Kirkpatrick)	0	1	0	2	2	0	1	1	7
Norway (Walstad)	1	0	2	0	0	1	0	0	4

Sheet C	1	2	3	4	5	6	7	8	Final
Germany (Kapp)	1	1	0	0	0	2	0	0	4
Finland (Rantamaki)	0	0	2	0	0	0	2	1	5

Sheet D	1	2	3	4	5	6	7	8	Final
Australia (Palangio)	5	0	3	0	2	0	3	X	13
Israel (Sone)	0	3	0	2	0	1	0	X	6

Sheet F	1	2	3	4	5	6	7	8	Final
Latvia (Abrickis)	2	1	0	1	1	3	X	X	8
Wales (Meikle)	0	0	1	0	0	0	X	X	1

=== Group C ===
==== Saturday, September 12 ====
Draw 1 8:00

Sheet A	1	2	3	4	5	6	7	8	Final
Kazakhstan (Kim)	4	1	0	0	0	1	0	X	6
Poland (Szeliga-Frynia)	0	0	5	1	2	0	5	X	13

Sheet E	1	2	3	4	5	6	7	8	Final
Switzerland (Schwaller)	2	0	2	0	2	0	1	X	7
China (Ji)	0	2	0	2	0	0	0	X	4

Draw 3 16:00

Sheet B	1	2	3	4	5	6	7	8	Final
England (Bates)	0	0	0	0	3	0	1	0	4
Russia (Tselousov)	0	2	0	0	0	2	0	1	5

Sheet C	1	2	3	4	5	6	7	8	Final
Slovenia (Zagar)	0	0	0	1	0	0	X	X	1
China (Ji)	2	1	2	0	4	2	X	X	11

Sheet D	1	2	3	4	5	6	7	8	Final
New Zealand (Watt)	0	0	0	1	0	0	X	X	1
Switzerland (Schwaller)	1	1	1	0	4	1	X	X	8

Sheet F	1	2	3	4	5	6	7	8	Final
Kazakhstan (Kim)	0	1	1	0	0	1	0	X	3
Czech Republic (Valek)	2	0	0	2	3	0	1	X	8

==== Sunday, September 13 ====
Draw 5 8:00

Sheet B	1	2	3	4	5	6	7	8	Final
Poland (Szeliga-Frynia)	0	0	1	0	2	2	1	X	6
Czech Republic (Valek)	0	0	0	3	0	0	0	X	3

Sheet D	1	2	3	4	5	6	7	8	Final
Russia (Tselousov)	3	2	2	3	0	0	0	X	10
Kazakhstan (Kim)	0	0	0	0	1	1	1	X	3

Sheet E	1	2	3	4	5	6	7	8	Final
England (Bates)	1	0	0	1	0	2	1	0	5
New Zealand (Watt)	0	1	2	0	2	0	0	2	7

Draw 7 16:00

Sheet A	1	2	3	4	5	6	7	8	Final
China (Ji)	1	0	0	1	3	3	3	X	11
New Zealand (Watt)	0	1	1	0	0	0	0	X	2

Sheet C	1	2	3	4	5	6	7	8	Final
Poland (Szeliga-Frynia)	1	0	1	0	0	0	1	0	3
Russia (Tselousov)	0	2	0	1	0	0	0	1	4

Sheet F	1	2	3	4	5	6	7	8	Final
Switzerland (Schwaller)	0	1	1	0	0	2	0	0	4
Slovenia (Zagar)	0	0	0	1	1	0	1	0	3

==== Monday, September 14 ====
Draw 10 12:00

Sheet C	1	2	3	4	5	6	7	8	Final
Czech Republic (Valek)	0	2	0	2	0	0	2	X	6
England (Bates)	0	0	1	0	1	1	0	X	3

Sheet F	1	2	3	4	5	6	7	8	9	Final
Slovenia (Zagar)	1	0	1	0	2	0	1	0	0	5
New Zealand (Watt)	0	1	0	1	0	2	0	1	1	6

Draw 12 20:00

Sheet A	1	2	3	4	5	6	7	8	Final
Poland (Szeliga-Frynia)	0	1	0	1	0	2	0	X	4
Switzerland (Schwaller)	0	0	1	0	3	0	2	X	6

Sheet B	1	2	3	4	5	6	7	8	Final
Kazakhstan (Kim)	0	2	0	0	1	0	2	0	5
Slovenia (Zagar)	1	0	0	2	0	2	0	1	6

Sheet D	1	2	3	4	5	6	7	8	Final
England (Bates)	0	0	0	2	0	1	0	0	3
China (Ji)	1	0	1	0	1	0	0	1	4

Sheet E	1	2	3	4	5	6	7	8	Final
Russia (Tselousov)	3	0	1	1	0	1	0	1	7
Czech Republic (Valek)	0	3	0	0	1	0	1	0	5

==== Tuesday, September 15 ====
Draw 14 12:00

Sheet D	1	2	3	4	5	6	7	8	Final
Slovenia (Zagar)	0	0	2	0	1	0	2	2	7
England (Bates)	1	0	0	1	0	1	0	0	3

Sheet E	1	2	3	4	5	6	7	8	Final
Kazakhstan (Kim)	1	0	0	1	0	0	X	X	2
Switzerland (Schwaller)	0	4	2	0	2	4	X	X	12

Draw 16 20:00

Sheet A	1	2	3	4	5	6	7	8	Final
England (Bates)	0	3	1	0	3	0	3	X	10
Kazakhstan (Kim)	1	0	0	1	0	2	0	X	4

Sheet B	1	2	3	4	5	6	7	8	Final
New Zealand (Watt)	0	2	0	0	1	0	0	0	3
Poland (Szeliga-Frynia)	1	0	1	0	0	1	1	1	5

Sheet C	1	2	3	4	5	6	7	8	Final
Russia (Tselousov)	1	0	1	1	1	1	0	X	5
Slovenia (Zagar)	0	1	0	0	0	0	1	X	2

Sheet F	1	2	3	4	5	6	7	8	Final
Czech Republic (Valek)	0	0	0	0	0	1	0	X	1
China (Ji)	0	2	0	1	1	0	0	X	4

==== Wednesday, September 16 ====
Draw 18 12:00

Sheet A	1	2	3	4	5	6	7	8	Final
New Zealand (Watt)	0	2	0	0	1	0	X	X	3
Russia (Tselousov)	2	0	1	2	0	5	X	X	10

Sheet B	1	2	3	4	5	6	7	8	Final
China (Ji)	2	0	3	0	3	0	2	X	10
Kazakhstan (Kim)	0	2	0	0	0	1	0	X	3

Sheet C	1	2	3	4	5	6	7	8	Final
Switzerland (Schwaller)	5	1	0	2	4	0	X	X	12
Czech Republic (Valek)	0	0	1	0	0	1	X	X	0

Sheet F	1	2	3	4	5	6	7	8	Final
Poland (Szeliga-Frynia)	0	0	1	1	0	0	2	X	4
England (Bates)	0	1	0	0	0	1	0	X	2

Draw 20 20:00

Sheet D	1	2	3	4	5	6	7	8	Final
Czech Republic (Valek)	1	0	0	1	0	1	0	1	4
New Zealand (Watt)	0	1	0	0	1	0	0	0	2

Sheet E	1	2	3	4	5	6	7	8	Final
Slovenia (Zagar)	0	0	2	2	0	1	1	X	6
Poland (Szeliga-Frynia)	1	1	0	0	1	0	0	X	3

==== Thursday, September 17 ====
Draw 22 12:00

Sheet A	1	2	3	4	5	6	7	8	Final
Czech Republic (Valek)	0	2	3	0	0	1	0	1	7
Slovenia (Zagar)	4	0	0	0	1	0	1	0	6

Sheet C	1	2	3	4	5	6	7	8	Final
New Zealand (Watt)	1	0	0	3	0	1	0	1	6
Kazakhstan (Kim)	0	1	0	0	2	0	2	0	5

Sheet D	1	2	3	4	5	6	7	8	Final
China (Ji)	0	2	2	1	3	0	1	X	9
Poland (Szeliga-Frynia)	1	0	0	0	0	1	0	X	2

Sheet F	1	2	3	4	5	6	7	8	Final
Russia (Tselousov)	2	0	1	0	0	0	2	1	6
Switzerland (Schwaller)	0	0	0	1	1	2	0	0	4

Draw 24 20:00

Sheet B	1	2	3	4	5	6	7	8	Final
Switzerland (Schwaller)	3	0	0	2	1	1	0	0	7
England (Bates)	0	0	3	0	0	0	1	1	5

Sheet E	1	2	3	4	5	6	7	8	Final
China (Gao)	0	0	1	1	3	3	X	X	8
Russia (Tselousov)	0	0	0	0	0	0	X	X	0

=== Group D ===
==== Saturday, September 12 ====
Draw 2 12:00

Sheet A	1	2	3	4	5	6	7	8	9	Final
Estonia (Lill)	2	0	1	0	2	0	0	0	1	6
Japan (Kashiwagi)	0	1	0	2	0	1	0	1	0	5

Sheet E	1	2	3	4	5	6	7	8	9	Final
United States (Clark)	0	2	0	1	0	2	0	0	2	7
Austria (Toth)	1	0	1	0	2	0	0	1	0	5

Draw 4 20:30

Sheet B	1	2	3	4	5	6	7	8	Final
Brazil (Mello)	1	0	0	0	1	0	X	X	2
Scotland (Bryce)	0	4	3	1	0	5	X	X	13

Sheet C	1	2	3	4	5	6	7	8	Final
Turkey (Karataş)	1	1	1	0	0	0	3	1	7
Austria (Toth)	0	0	0	1	1	2	0	0	4

Sheet D	1	2	3	4	5	6	7	8	Final
Hungary (Nagy)	1	0	1	0	2	0	3	X	7
United States (Clark)	0	1	0	1	0	1	0	X	3

Sheet F	1	2	3	4	5	6	7	8	Final
Estonia (Lill)	1	0	0	2	0	2	0	1	6
Belarus (Petrov)	0	0	0	0	1	0	1	0	2

==== Sunday, September 13 ====
Draw 6 12:00

Sheet B	1	2	3	4	5	6	7	8	Final
Japan (Kashiwagi)	5	0	0	2	0	0	0	X	7
Belarus (Petrov)	0	2	0	0	3	5	1	X	11

Sheet D	1	2	3	4	5	6	7	8	Final
Scotland (Bryce)	3	0	0	0	5	0	4	X	12
Estonia (Lill)	0	1	1	1	0	1	0	X	4

Sheet E	1	2	3	4	5	6	7	8	Final
Brazil (Mello)	0	2	0	0	1	0	0	X	3
Hungary (Nagy)	1	0	1	1	0	2	1	X	6

Sheet F	1	2	3	4	5	6	7	8	Final
United States (Clark)	0	0	1	2	2	1	1	X	7
Turkey (Karataş)	2	1	0	0	0	0	0	X	3

Draw 8 20:00

Sheet A	1	2	3	4	5	6	7	8	Final
Austria (Toth)	1	0	0	1	0	0	2	X	4
Hungary (Nagy)	0	3	0	0	1	3	0	X	7

Sheet C	1	2	3	4	5	6	7	8	Final
Japan (Kashiwagi)	0	1	0	1	0	0	0	X	2
Scotland (Bryce)	0	0	1	0	1	1	1	X	4

==== Monday, September 14 ====
Draw 10 12:00

Sheet A	1	2	3	4	5	6	7	8	Final
Japan (Kashiwagi)	0	1	0	0	1	0	1	X	3
United States (Clark)	1	0	2	2	0	2	0	X	7

Sheet B	1	2	3	4	5	6	7	8	Final
Estonia (Lill)	2	0	0	1	0	0	0	X	3
Turkey (Karataş)	0	1	1	0	1	1	1	X	5

Sheet D	1	2	3	4	5	6	7	8	Final
Brazil (Mello)	0	1	0	0	0	1	0	X	2
Austria (Toth)	1	0	3	0	1	0	3	X	8

Sheet E	1	2	3	4	5	6	7	8	Final
Scotland (Bryce)	4	2	3	1	2	0	X	X	12
Belarus (Petrov)	0	0	0	0	0	1	X	X	1

Draw 12 20:00

Sheet C	1	2	3	4	5	6	7	8	Final
Belarus (Petrov)	2	3	2	2	1	1	X	X	11
Brazil (Mello)	0	0	0	0	0	0	X	X	0

Sheet F	1	2	3	4	5	6	7	8	Final
Turkey (Karataş)	0	1	0	1	0	2	0	X	4
Hungary (Nagy)	1	0	2	0	1	0	3	X	7

==== Tuesday, September 15 ====
Draw 13 8:00

Sheet D	1	2	3	4	5	6	7	8	Final
Turkey (Karataş)	0	0	1	0	0	2	0	2	5
Brazil (Mello)	0	2	0	1	0	0	1	0	4

Sheet E	1	2	3	4	5	6	7	8	Final
Estonia (Lill)	0	1	0	1	0	1	0	X	3
United States (Clark)	1	0	2	0	2	0	1	X	6

Draw 15 16:00

Sheet A	1	2	3	4	5	6	7	8	Final
Brazil (Mello)	0	0	0	1	0	2	0	X	3
Estonia (Lill)	3	1	1	0	1	0	1	X	7

Sheet B	1	2	3	4	5	6	7	8	Final
Hungary (Nagy)	2	0	4	0	1	0	3	X	10
Japan (Kashiwagi)	0	2	0	2	0	1	0	X	5

Sheet C	1	2	3	4	5	6	7	8	Final
Scotland (Bryce)	1	1	0	2	1	0	4	X	9
Turkey (Karataş)	0	0	1	0	0	1	0	X	2

Sheet F	1	2	3	4	5	6	7	8	Final
Belarus (Petrov)	1	0	0	1	0	0	0	X	2
Austria (Toth)	0	2	1	0	3	1	0	X	7

==== Wednesday, September 16 ====
Draw 17 8:00

Sheet D	1	2	3	4	5	6	7	8	Final
Belarus (Petrov)	0	1	0	1	0	0	X	X	2
Hungary (Nagy)	1	0	3	0	2	3	X	X	9

Sheet E	1	2	3	4	5	6	7	8	Final
Turkey (Karataş)	1	0	1	0	0	0	1	X	3
Japan (Kashiwagi)	0	4	0	0	1	1	0	X	6

Draw 19 16:00

Sheet A	1	2	3	4	5	6	7	8	Final
Hungary (Nagy)	2	0	0	0	1	0	X	X	3
Scotland (Bryce)	0	4	3	3	0	1	X	X	11

Sheet B	1	2	3	4	5	6	7	8	9	Final
Austria (Toth)	2	1	0	0	3	1	0	0	1	8
Estonia (Lill)	0	0	2	0	0	0	3	2	0	7

Sheet C	1	2	3	4	5	6	7	8	Final
United States (Clark)	2	0	4	2	0	0	X	X	8
Belarus (Petrov)	0	2	0	0	1	0	X	X	3

Sheet F	1	2	3	4	5	6	7	8	Final
Japan (Kashiwagi)	4	1	0	0	1	0	1	X	7
Brazil (Mello)	0	0	2	0	0	1	0	X	3

==== Thursday, September 17 ====
Draw 21 8:00

Sheet A	1	2	3	4	5	6	7	8	Final
Belarus (Petrov)	0	3	0	2	0	1	0	X	6
Turkey (Karataş)	2	0	2	0	2	0	3	X	9

Sheet C	1	2	3	4	5	6	7	8	Final
Hungary (Nagy)	0	0	1	1	0	3	1	0	6
Estonia (Lill)	0	4	0	0	1	0	0	2	7

Sheet D	1	2	3	4	5	6	7	8	Final
Austria (Toth)	0	2	0	1	0	0	2	0	5
Japan (Kashiwagi)	1	0	2	0	2	1	0	1	7

Sheet F	1	2	3	4	5	6	7	8	Final
Scotland (Bryce)	0	2	0	1	0	0	0	X	3
United States (Clark)	1	0	1	0	2	4	1	X	9

Draw 23 16:00

Sheet B	1	2	3	4	5	6	7	8	Final
United States (Clark)	1	0	3	2	1	0	0	X	7
Brazil (Mello)	0	1	0	0	0	0	1	X	2

Sheet E	1	2	3	4	5	6	7	8	Final
Austria (Toth)	0	0	1	0	1	0	1	X	3
Scotland (Bryce)	3	0	0	2	0	1	0	X	6

== Tiebreaker ==
Friday, September 18, 9:00

Sheet E	1	2	3	4	5	6	7	8	Final
Denmark (Qvist)	1	0	1	0	3	2	X	X	7
France (Mercier)	0	0	0	1	0	0	X	X	1

== Playoffs ==
Round of 12
Italy	4
Canada	7
Denmark	5
Norway	10
China	5
Hungary	4
Switzerland	6
Scotland	4

Quarterfinals
United States	5
Norway	7
Sweden	5
Switzerland	4
China	8
Germany	3
Russia	8
Canada	3

Semifinals
Sweden	6
Russia	5
China	3
Norway	7

Gold Medal Game
Sweden	3
Norway	5

Bronze Medal Game
Russia	4
China	5

=== Round of 12 ===
Friday, September 18, 14:00

Sheet E	1	2	3	4	5	6	7	8	Final
Italy (Pimpini)	0	1	0	0	2	0	1	0	4
Canada (Kirkpatrick)	1	0	1	2	0	2	0	1	7

Sheet F	1	2	3	4	5	6	7	8	Final
Denmark (Qvist)	2	0	0	1	0	2	0	0	5
Norway (Walstad)	0	2	1	0	1	0	2	4	10

Sheet D	1	2	3	4	5	6	7	8	Final
China (Ji)	1	0	3	0	0	1	0	0	5
Hungary (Nagy)	0	1	0	1	0	0	2	0	4

Sheet C	1	2	3	4	5	6	7	8	Final
Switzerland (Schwaller)	0	2	0	0	1	0	2	1	6
Scotland (Bryce)	1	0	1	0	0	2	0	0	4

=== Quarterfinals ===
Friday, September 18, 20:00

Sheet C	1	2	3	4	5	6	7	8	Final
United States (Clark)	1	0	2	0	1	0	1	0	5
Norway (Walstad)	0	1	0	2	0	2	0	2	7

Sheet D	1	2	3	4	5	6	7	8	Final
Sweden (Wranå)	0	1	0	0	2	0	0	2	5
Switzerland (Schwaller)	0	0	0	2	0	1	1	0	4

Sheet E	1	2	3	4	5	6	7	8	Final
China (Ji)	0	2	0	2	1	2	1	X	8
Germany (Kapp)	1	0	2	0	0	0	0	X	3

Sheet F	1	2	3	4	5	6	7	8	Final
Russia (Tselousov)	0	0	0	3	0	0	5	X	8
Canada (Kirkpatrick)	0	1	1	0	1	0	0	X	3

=== Semifinals ===
Saturday, September 19, 10:00

Sheet C	1	2	3	4	5	6	7	8	Final
Sweden (Wranå)	2	0	3	0	0	0	0	1	6
Russia (Tselousov)	0	1	0	1	1	1	1	0	5

Sheet F	1	2	3	4	5	6	7	8	Final
China (Ji)	2	0	0	0	0	1	0	X	3
Norway (Walstad)	0	4	1	0	1	0	1	X	7

=== Bronze medal game ===
Saturday, September 19, 15:00

Sheet E	1	2	3	4	5	6	7	8	9	Final
Russia (Tselousov)	0	0	0	0	0	2	0	2	0	4
China (Ji)	1	0	0	0	1	0	2	0	1	5

=== Gold medal game ===
Saturday, September 19, 15:00

Sheet D	1	2	3	4	5	6	7	8	Final
Norway (Walstad)	2	0	1	0	0	2	0	X	5
Sweden (Wranå)	0	0	0	2	0	0	1	X	3
