= Ekaterina Kirillova =

Belarusian female curler and curling coach

- Curler
- Born: 21 February 1973 (age 53)

Curling career
- World Mixed Doubles Championship: 2 (2014, 2015)
- European Championship: (2011, 2012, 2013, 2014, 2018)
- Other appearances: World Mixed Championship: 1 (2015), European Mixed Championship: 5 (2009, 2010, 2011, 2012, 2013)
Medal record
Curling
Representing Belarus

Ekaterina Kirillova (Belarusian: Екатери́на Кири́ллова, Russian: Екатери́на Кири́ллова; born 21 February 1973) is a Belarusian female curler and curling coach. She is right-handed.

== Achievements ==
- Belarusian Mixed Doubles Curling Championship: gold (2016).

== Teams and events ==
=== Women's ===
Season	Skip	Third	Second	Lead	Alternate	Coach	Events
2010–11	Ekaterina Kirillova	Alina Pavlyuchik	Natalia Sverzhinskaya	Susanna Ivashyna		Dmitry Kirillov	ECC-C 2011 (5th)
2011–12	Ekaterina Kirillova	Alina Pavlyuchik	Natalia Sverzhinskaya	Susanna Ivashyna	Arina Sverzhinskaya		ECC-C 2012 (gold)
2012–13	Ekaterina Kirillova	Alina Pavlyuchik	Susanna Ivashyna	Natalia Sverzhinskaya	Arina Sverzhinskaya	Dmitry Kirillov	ECC 2012 (19th)
2013–14	Alina Pavlyuchik	Natalia Sverzhinskaya	Ewgeniya Orlis	Ekaterina Kirillova	Arina Sverzhinskaya	Artis Zentelis	ECC 2013 (17th)
2014–15	Alina Pavlyuchik	Natalia Sverzhinskaya	Susanna Ivashyna	Ekaterina Kirillova	Arina Sverzhinskaya	Katja Kiiskinen	ECC 2014 (19th)
2017–18	Daria Bogatova	Natalia Rudnitskaya	Ekaterina Kirillova	Polina Petrova	Vera Dosava	Vasily Telezhkin	ECC-C 2018 (5th)

=== Mixed ===
Season	Skip	Third	Second	Lead	Alternate	Events
2009–10	Dmitry Kirillov	Ekaterina Kirillova	Dmitry Yarko	Ewgeniya Orlis	Anna Alexandrovich	EMxCC 2009 (23rd)
2010–11	Dmitry Kirillov	Ekaterina Kirillova	Dmitry Yarko	Alina Pavlyuchik		EMxCC 2010 (20th)
2011–12	Dmitry Kirillov	Alina Pavlyuchik	Dmitry Yarko	Ekaterina Kirillova	Natalia Sverzhinskaya, Susanna Ivashyna	EMCC 2011 (21st)
2012–13	Dmitry Kirillov	Alina Pavlyuchik	Dmitry Yarko	Ekaterina Kirillova	Andrey Aulasenka	EMCC 2012 (20th)
2013–14	Alina Pavlyuchik (fourth)	Dmitry Kirillov (skip)	Ekaterina Kirillova	George Kirillov		EMCC 2013 (16th)
2015–16	Pavel Petrov	Ekaterina Kirillova	Dmitry Kirillov	Polina Petrova		WMxCC 2015 (31st)

=== Mixed doubles ===
Season	Male	Female	Coach	Events
2013–14	Dmitry Kirillov	Ekaterina Kirillova		WMDCC 2014 (31st)
2014–15	Dmitry Kirillov	Ekaterina Kirillova		WMDCC 2015 (29th)
2016–17	Ilya Shalamitski	Ekaterina Kirillova	Anton Batugin (WMDCC)	BMDCC 2016 (gold); WMDCC 2017 (22nd)
2017–18	Dzmitry Rudnitski	Ekaterina Kirillova		BMDCC 2018 (6th)

== Coaching (national teams) ==
Season	Event	Team	Place
2010–11	2010 European Curling Championships	Belarus (men)	22nd
2011–12	2011 European Curling Championships	Belarus (men)	25th
2014–15	2014 European Curling Championships	Belarus (men)	28th (5th in C group)
