= 2010 Whites Drug Store Classic =

World Curling Tour event

- Host city: Swan Lake, Manitoba
- Arena: Swan Lake Curling Club
- Dates: November 11–14
- Winner: (Alberta) Kevin Martin
- Curling club: Saville SC, Edmonton
- Skip: Kevin Martin
- Third: John Morris
- Second: Marc Kennedy
- Lead: Ben Hebert
- Finalist: (Saskatchewan) Darrell McKee

The 2010 Whites Drug Store Classic was a curling tournament held from November 11 to November 14 at Swan Lake Curling Club in Swan Lake, Manitoba. In the final, defending champion Kevin Martin of Alberta defeated Darrell McKee of Saskatchewan 6–2 in 7 ends.

== Teams ==
Skip	Third	Second	Lead	Locale
Jason Ackerman	Andrew Foreman	Ryan Sveinbjornson	Curtis Horwath	(Saskatchewan) Regina
Sam Antila	Jonathan Sawatzky	Rick Shroeder	Jeff Antila	(Manitoba) Thompson
David Bohn	Dennis Bohn	Kody Janzen	Larry Solomon	(Manitoba) Winnipeg
Randy Bryden	Troy Robinson	Trent Knapp	Kelly Knapp	(Saskatchewan) Regina
Rob Fowler	Allan Lyburn	Richard Daneault	Derek Samagalski	(Manitoba) Brandon
Jason Gunnlaugson	Justin Richter	Tyler Forrest	Alexey Stukalsky	(Russia) Moscow
Jeff Hartung	Kody Hartung	Craig Kaeding	Claire DeCock	(Saskatchewan) Langenburg
Joel Jordison	Jason Jacobson	Brock Montgomery	Aaron Shutra	(Saskatchewan) Moose Jaw
David Kraichy	Travis Bale	Jim Coleman	Brad Van Walleghem	(Manitoba) Winnipeg
Tyler Kushniryk	Lionel Hansen	Don Lumax	Wayne Kushniryk	(Manitoba) Swan River
William Lyburn	James Kirkness	Alex Forrest	Greg Melnichuk	(Manitoba) Winnipeg
Scott Madams	Braden Zawada	Ian Fordyce	Nigel Milnes	(Manitoba) Winnipeg
Kevin Martin	John Morris	Marc Kennedy	Ben Hebert	(Alberta) Edmonton
Darrell McKee	Bruce Korte	Roger Korte	Rob Markowsky	(Saskatchewan) Saskatoon
Claudio Pescia	Sven Iten	Reto Seiler	Rainer Kobler	Switzerland
Daley Peters (fourth)	Vic Peters (skip)	Kyle Werenich	Cory Naharnie	(Manitoba) Winnipeg
Jerod Roland	John Lilla	Adam Nathan	Cooper Smith	(North Dakota) Minot
Manuel Ruch	Claudio Pätz	Daniel Graf	Andreas Klauenbosch	Switzerland
Brent Scales	Gord Hard	Howie Scales	Todd Trevellyan	(Manitoba) Swan River
Pat Simmons	Steve Laycock	Brennen Jones	Dallan Muyres	(Saskatchewan) Davidson
Brendan Taylor	Scott Ramsay	Mark Taylor	Nathan Bodnarchuk	(Manitoba) Brandon
Greg Todoruk	Dwight Bottrell	Darcy Todoruk	Mike Csversko	(Manitoba) Dauphin
Neal Watkins	Kelly Tibble	Byron Zbirun	Kent Meyn	(Manitoba) Swan River
Murray Woodward	Dave Boehmer	Jerry Dreiger	Tyler Specula	(Manitoba) Île-des-Chênes

== Results ==
=== A Event ===
Round of 16
(Manitoba) William Lyburn	5
(Manitoba) David Kraichy	6
(Saskatchewan) Jason Ackerman	7
(Manitoba) Murray Woodward	1
(Switzerland) Claudio Pescia	3
(Saskatchewan) Jeff Hartung	7
(Saskatchewan) Joel Jordison	6
(Manitoba) Greg Todoruk	5

Quarterfinals
(Saskatchewan) Pat Simmons	7
(Manitoba) David Kraichy	1
(Saskatchewan) Randy Bryden	9
(Saskatchewan) Jason Ackerman	3
(Manitoba) Scott Madams	1
(Saskatchewan) Jeff Hartung	5
(Manitoba) Rob Fowler	6
(Saskatchewan) Joel Jordison	2

Semifinals
(Saskatchewan) Pat Simmons	2
(Saskatchewan) Randy Bryden	8
(Saskatchewan) Jeff Hartung	8
(Manitoba) Rob Fowler	7

Qualifier 1
(Saskatchewan) Randy Bryden	6
(Saskatchewan) Jeff Hartung	2

Round of 16
(Manitoba) Brent Scales	8
(North Dakota) Jerod Roland	7
(Saskatchewan) Darrell McKee	9
(Manitoba) Sam Antila	0
(Manitoba) Tyler Kushniryk	2
(Manitoba) Brendan Taylor	9
(Manitoba) Neal Watkins	8
(Switzerland) Manuel Ruch	2

Quarterfinals
(Russia) Jason Gunnlaugson	5
(Manitoba) Brent Scales	2
(Manitoba) David Bohn	3
(Saskatchewan) Darrell McKee	6
(Manitoba) Vic Peters	6
(Manitoba) Brendan Taylor	2
(Alberta) Kevin Martin	9
(Manitoba) Neal Watkins	3

Semifinals
(Russia) Jason Gunnlaugson	7
(Saskatchewan) Darrell McKee	4
(Manitoba) Vic Peters	0
(Alberta) Kevin Martin	6

Qualifier 2
(Russia) Jason Gunnlaugson	5
(Alberta) Kevin Martin	6

=== B Event ===
Round of 16
(Manitoba) Scott Madams	6
(Manitoba) William Lyburn	7
(Saskatchewan) Joel Jordison	4
(Manitoba) Murray Woodward	8
(Manitoba) David Kraichy	6
(Switzerland) Claudio Pescia	9
(Saskatchewan) Jason Ackerman	6
(Manitoba) Greg Todoruk	3

Quarterfinals
(Manitoba) William Lyburn	7
(Saskatchewan) Darrell McKee	8
(Manitoba) Murray Woodward	5
(Manitoba) Vic Peters	3
(Switzerland) Claudio Pescia	7
(Saskatchewan) Jason Ackerman	1

Semifinals
(Saskatchewan) Darrell McKee	7
(Manitoba) Murray Woodward	4
(Switzerland) Claudio Pescia	6
(Saskatchewan) Jeff Hartung	1

Qualifier 3
(Saskatchewan) Darrell McKee	6
(Switzerland) Claudio Pescia	5

Round of 16
(Manitoba) Brendan Taylor	7
(North Dakota) Jerod Roland	0
(Manitoba) Neal Watkins	4
(Manitoba) Sam Antila	5
(Manitoba) Brent Scales	7
(Manitoba) Tyler Kushniryk	2
(Manitoba) David Bohn	7
(Switzerland) Manuel Ruch	2

Quarterfinals
(Manitoba) Brendan Taylor	9
(Saskatchewan) Pat Simmons	4
(Manitoba) Sam Antila	2
(Manitoba) Rob Fowler	7
(Manitoba) Brent Scales	7
(Manitoba) David Bohn	3

Semifinals
(Manitoba) Brendan Taylor	5
(Manitoba) Rob Fowler	9
(Manitoba) Brent Scales	5
(Russia) Jason Gunnlaugson	6

Qualifier 4
(Manitoba) Rob Fowler	7
(Russia) Jason Gunnlaugson	4

=== C Event ===
Quarterfinals
(Saskatchewan) Pat Simmons	7
(Manitoba) Neal Watkins	2
(Manitoba) David Bohn	6
(North Dakota) Jerod Roland	4

Semifinals
(Saskatchewan) Pat Simmons	5
(Manitoba) David Bohn	2

Finals
(Saskatchewan) Pat Simmons	7
(Switzerland) Claudio Pescia	1
Qualifier 5

Quarterfinals
(Manitoba) Tyler Kushniryk	1
(Switzerland) Manuel Ruch	10

Semifinals
(Switzerland) Manuel Ruch	2
(Saskatchewan) Jeff Hartung	6
(Manitoba) Sam Antila	0
(Manitoba) Murray Woodward	7

Finals
(Saskatchewan) Jeff Hartung	7
(Manitoba) Murray Woodward	3
Qualifier 6

Quarterfinals
(Manitoba) Vic Peters	6
(Manitoba) Scott Madams	4
(Manitoba) David Kraichy	5
(Manitoba) Greg Todoruk	1

Semifinals
(Manitoba) Vic Peters	5
(Manitoba) Brent Scales	6
(Manitoba) David Kraichy	4
(Manitoba) Brendan Taylor	6

Finals
(Manitoba) Brent Scales	1
(Manitoba) Brendan Taylor	5
Qualifier 7

Quarterfinals
(Saskatchewan) Jason Ackerman	7
(Saskatchewan) Joel Jordison	1

Semifinals
(Saskatchewan) Jason Ackerman	4
(Manitoba) William Lyburn	8

Finals
(Manitoba) William Lyburn	5
(Russia) Jason Gunnlaugson	7
Qualifier 8

=== Playoffs ===
All times shown in Central Standard Time

Quarterfinals
(Saskatchewan) Randy Bryden	3
(Saskatchewan) Pat Simmons	6
(Saskatchewan) Darrell McKee	6
(Saskatchewan) Jeff Hartung	4
(Alberta) Kevin Martin	7
(Manitoba) Brendan Taylor	3
(Manitoba) Rob Fowler	5
(Russia) Jason Gunnlaugson	1

Semifinals
(Saskatchewan) Pat Simmons	3
(Saskatchewan) Darrell McKee	6
(Alberta) Kevin Martin	6
(Manitoba) Rob Fowler	3

Final
(Saskatchewan) Darrell McKee	2
(Alberta) Kevin Martin	6

==== Quarterfinals ====
Sunday, November 14, 9:00am

Team	1	2	3	4	5	6	7	8	Final
(Saskatchewan) Randy Bryden 🔨	2	0	0	0	1	0	0	X	3
(Saskatchewan) Pat Simmons	0	2	1	1	0	1	1	X	6

Team	1	2	3	4	5	6	7	8	Final
(Saskatchewan) Darrell McKee 🔨	0	2	0	2	0	2	0	X	6
(Saskatchewan) Jeff Hartung	0	0	2	0	1	0	1	X	4

Team	1	2	3	4	5	6	7	8	Final
(Alberta) Kevin Martin 🔨	0	1	0	4	2	0	X	X	7
(Manitoba) Brendan Taylor	0	0	2	0	0	1	X	X	3

Team	1	2	3	4	5	6	7	8	Final
(Manitoba) Rob Fowler 🔨	1	1	1	1	0	1	X	X	5
(Russia) Jason Gunnlaugson	0	0	0	0	1	0	X	X	1

==== Semifinals ====
Sunday, November 14, 12:00pm

Team	1	2	3	4	5	6	7	8	Final
(Saskatchewan) Pat Simmons	0	0	0	1	0	0	2	0	3
(Saskatchewan) Darrell McKee 🔨	0	2	1	0	1	1	0	1	6

Team	1	2	3	4	5	6	7	8	Final
(Alberta) Kevin Martin 🔨	1	0	0	0	1	0	0	4	6
(Manitoba) Rob Fowler	0	1	0	1	0	1	0	0	3

==== Final ====
Sunday, November 14, 3:00pm

Team	1	2	3	4	5	6	7	8	Final
(Saskatchewan) Darrell McKee	0	1	0	0	0	1	0	X	2
(Alberta) Kevin Martin 🔨	1	0	1	1	1	0	2	X	6
