= 2011 Whites Drug Store Classic =

World Curling Tour event

- Host city: Swan River, Manitoba
- Arena: Swan River Curling Club
- Dates: November 11–14
- Winner: (Manitoba) Reid Carruthers
- Skip: Reid Carruthers
- Third: Andrew Irving
- Second: Dennis Bohn
- Lead: Larry Solomon
- Finalist: (Saskatchewan) Colton Flasch

The 2011 Whites Drug Store Classic was held from November 11 to 14 at the Swan River Curling Club in Swan River, Manitoba as part of the 2011–12 World Curling Tour. The purse for the event was CAD$44,000, with the event held in a triple knockout format. The winning team was David Bohn's squad from Winnipeg, with Reid Carruthers filling in as skip.

== Teams ==
Skip	Third	Second	Lead	Locale
Sam Antila	Curtis Ross	Ian Graham	Cory Boisvert	Thompson, Manitoba
Derek Boe	Erwin Hanley	Dean Cursons	Cory Hubick	Regina, Saskatchewan
Randy Bryden	Troy Robinson	Trent Knapp	Kelly Knapp	Regina, Saskatchewan
Reid Carruthers	Andrew Irving	Dennis Bohn	Larry Solomon	Winnipeg, Manitoba
Jerry Chudley	Kevin Cooley	Kyle Csversko	Paul Robertson	Neepawa, Manitoba
Carl deConinck Smith	Jeff Sharp	Chris Haichert	Jesse St. John	Rosetown, Saskatchewan
Matt Lang (fourth)	Colton Flasch (skip)	Tyler Hartung	Jayden Shwaga	Saskatoon, Saskatchewan
Rob Fowler	Allan Lyburn	Richard Daneault	Derek Samagalski	Brandon, Manitoba
Brent Gedak	John Aston	Derek Owens	Malcolm Vanstone	Regina, Saskatchewan
Jeff Hartung	Kody Hartung	Craig Kaeding	Shayne Hannon	Langenburg, Saskatchewan
Brad Heidt	Mitch Heidt	Josh Heidt	Regis Neumeier	Kindersley, Saskatchewan
Steve Laycock	Joel Jordison	Brennen Jones	Dallan Muyres	Saskatoon, Saskatchewan
William Lyburn	James Kirkness	Alex Forrest	Tyler Forrest	Winnipeg, Manitoba
Kelly Marnoch	Tyler Waterhouse	Travis Brooks	Chris Cameron	Carberry, Manitoba
Darrell McKee	Clint Dieno	Jason Jacobson	Brock Montgomery	Saskatoon, Saskatchewan
Terry McNamee	Steve Irwin	Geordie Hargreaves	Travis Saban	Brandon, Manitoba
Braeden Moskowy	Kirk Muyres	D.J. Kidby	Dustin Kidby	Regina, Saskatchewan
Claudio Pescia	Sven Iten	Reto Seiler	Rainer Kobler	St. Gallen, Switzerland
Daley Peters (fourth)	Vic Peters (skip)	Brendan Taylor	Kyle Werenich	Winnipeg, Manitoba
Scott Ramsay	Mark Taylor	Ross McFadyen	Ken Buchanan	Winnipeg, Manitoba
Howie Scales				Swan River, Manitoba
Al Schick	William Coutts	Stuart Coutts	Dean Clark	Regina, Saskatchewan
Greg Todoruk	Dwight Bottrell	Darcy Todoruk	Mike Csversko	Dauphin, Manitoba
Glen Toews	Nick Ogryzlo	Mike Schott	Cory Toews	Swan River, Manitoba

== Results ==
=== A Event ===
First Knockout
(Manitoba) Kelly Marnoch	5
(Saskatchewan) Derek Boe	7
(Manitoba) Terry McNamee	6
(Manitoba) Howie Scales	4
(Saskatchewan) Al Schick	8
(Manitoba) Sam Antila	3
(Saskatchewan) Colton Flasch	7
(Manitoba) Greg Todoruk	3

Quarterfinals
(Saskatchewan) Steve Laycock	9
(Saskatchewan) Derek Boe	2
(Manitoba) William Lyburn	4
(Manitoba) Terry McNamee	5
(Saskatchewan) Al Schick	5
(Saskatchewan) Braeden Moskowy	4
(Saskatchewan) Colton Flasch	7
(Saskatchewan) Randy Bryden	3

Semifinals
(Saskatchewan) Steve Laycock	6
(Manitoba) Terry McNamee	9
(Saskatchewan) Al Schick	3
(Saskatchewan) Colton Flasch	5

Qualifier 1
(Manitoba) Terry McNamee	5
(Saskatchewan) Colton Flasch	6

First Knockout
(Saskatchewan) Jeff Hartung	4
(Saskatchewan) Brad Heidt	5
(Saskatchewan) Darrell McKee	6
(Manitoba) Jerry Chudley	5
(Manitoba) Reid Carruthers	8
(Manitoba) Glen Toews	1
(Saskatchewan) Brent Gedak	3
(Manitoba) Scott Ramsay	4

Quarterfinals
(Saskatchewan) Carl deConinck Smith	7
(Saskatchewan) Brad Heidt	3
(Manitoba) Vic Peters	4
(Saskatchewan) Darrell McKee	6
(Manitoba) Reid Carruthers	6
(Switzerland) Claudio Pescia	5
(Manitoba) Scott Ramsay	1
(Manitoba) Rob Fowler	7

Semifinals
(Saskatchewan) Carl deConinck Smith	2
(Saskatchewan) Darrell McKee	5
(Manitoba) Reid Carruthers	5
(Manitoba) Rob Fowler	2

Qualifier 2
(Saskatchewan) Darrell McKee	2
(Manitoba) Reid Carruthers	6

=== B Event ===
Second Knockout
(Saskatchewan) Braeden Moskowy	6
(Manitoba) Kelly Marnoch	5
(Saskatchewan) Randy Bryden	8
(Manitoba) Howie Scales	1
(Saskatchewan) Derek Boe	6
(Manitoba) Sam Antila	4
(Manitoba) William Lyburn	7
(Manitoba) Greg Todoruk	6

Quarterfinals
(Saskatchewan) Braeden Moskowy	7
(Saskatchewan) Carl deConinck Smith	4
(Saskatchewan) Randy Bryden	4
(Manitoba) Rob Fowler	6
(Saskatchewan) Derek Boe	6
(Manitoba) William Lyburn	3

Semifinals
(Saskatchewan) Braeden Moskowy	2
(Manitoba) Rob Fowler	9
(Saskatchewan) Derek Boe	5
(Manitoba) Terry McNamee	6

Qualifier 3
(Manitoba) Rob Fowler	7
(Manitoba) Terry McNamee	3

Second Knockout
(Switzerland) Claudio Pescia	8
(Saskatchewan) Jeff Hartung	1
(Manitoba) Scott Ramsay	6
(Manitoba) Jerry Chudley	7
(Saskatchewan) Brad Heidt	5
(Manitoba) Glen Toews	6
(Manitoba) Vic Peters	9
(Saskatchewan) Brent Gedak	1

Quarterfinals
(Switzerland) Claudio Pescia	2
(Saskatchewan) Steve Laycock	7
(Manitoba) Jerry Chudley	7
(Saskatchewan) Al Schick	8
(Manitoba) Glen Toews	2
(Manitoba) Vic Peters	5

Semifinals
(Saskatchewan) Steve Laycock	5
(Saskatchewan) Al Schick	3
(Manitoba) Vic Peters	3
(Saskatchewan) Darrell McKee	7

Qualifier 4
(Saskatchewan) Steve Laycock	6
(Saskatchewan) Darrell McKee	3

=== C Event ===
Third Knockout		Semifinals		Qualifier 5
(Switzerland) Claudio Pescia	7
(Manitoba) Scott Ramsay	6	(Switzerland) Claudio Pescia	7
(Manitoba) Glen Toews	6	(Saskatchewan) Jeff Hartung	0
(Saskatchewan) Jeff Hartung	7			(Switzerland) Claudio Pescia	6
				(Manitoba) Terry McNamee	5

Third Knockout
(Saskatchewan) Brad Heidt	6
(Saskatchewan) Brent Gedak	2

Semifinals
(Saskatchewan) Brad Heidt	4
(Saskatchewan) Derek Boe	7
(Manitoba) Jerry Chudley	4
(Saskatchewan) Braeden Moskowy	6

Qualifier 6
(Saskatchewan) Derek Boe	7
(Saskatchewan) Braeden Moskowy	5

Third Knockout
(Saskatchewan) Randy Bryden	6
(Manitoba) Kelly Marnoch	4
(Manitoba) Sam Antila	10
(Manitoba) Greg Todoruk	7

Semifinals
(Saskatchewan) Randy Bryden	5
(Manitoba) Vic Peters	7
(Manitoba) Sam Antila	3
(Saskatchewan) Al Schick	9

Qualifier 7
(Manitoba) Vic Peters	5
(Saskatchewan) Al Schick	6

Third Knockout		Semifinals		Qualifier 8
(Manitoba) William Lyburn	7
(Manitoba) Howie Scales	4	(Manitoba) William Lyburn	6
		(Saskatchewan) Carl deConinck Smith	4
				(Manitoba) William Lyburn	4
				(Saskatchewan) Darrell McKee	5

== Playoffs ==
Quarterfinals
(Saskatchewan) Colton Flasch	7
(Switzerland) Claudio Pescia	4
(Manitoba) Rob Fowler	5
(Saskatchewan) Derek Boe	4
(Manitoba) Reid Carruthers	6
(Saskatchewan) Al Schick	5
(Saskatchewan) Steve Laycock	4
(Saskatchewan) Darrell McKee	7

Semifinals
(Saskatchewan) Colton Flasch	7
(Manitoba) Rob Fowler	2
(Manitoba) Reid Carruthers	4
(Saskatchewan) Darrell McKee	3

Final
(Saskatchewan) Colton Flasch	3
(Manitoba) Reid Carruthers	6
