= 2012 Point Optical Curling Classic =

World Curling Tour event

- Host city: Saskatoon, Saskatchewan
- Arena: Nutana Curling Club
- Dates: September 21–24
- Winner: (Ontario) John Epping
- Curling club: Donalda CC, Toronto
- Skip: John Epping
- Third: Scott Bailey
- Second: Scott Howard
- Lead: David Mathers
- Finalist: (Alberta) Kevin Koe

The 2012 Point Optical Curling Classic was held from September 21 to 24 at the Nutana Curling Club in Saskatoon, Saskatchewan as part of the 2012–13 World Curling Tour. The event was held in a triple knockout format, with the purse for the event being CAD$50,000. The winning team of John Epping received CAD$12,000 for their win.

== Teams ==
The teams are listed as follows:

Skip	Third	Second	Lead	Locale
Todd Birr	Doug Pottinger	Tom O'Connor	Kevin Birr	Mankato, Minnesota
Scott Bitz	Jeff Sharp	Aryn Schmidt	Dean Hicke	Regina, Saskatchewan
Brendan Bottcher	Micky Lizmore	Bradley Thiessen	Karrick Martin	Edmonton, Alberta
Jim Cotter	Jason Gunnlaugson	Tyrel Griffith	Rick Sawatsky	Kelowna/Vernon, British Columbia
Benoît Schwarz (fourth)	Peter de Cruz (skip)	Dominik Märki	Valentin Tanner	Switzerland
John Epping	Scott Bailey	Scott Howard	David Mathers	Toronto, Ontario
Rob Fowler	Allan Lyburn	Richard Daneault	Derek Samagalski	Brandon, Manitoba
Christopher Plys (fourth)	Tyler George (skip)	Rich Ruohonen	Colin Hufman	Duluth, Minnesota
Josh Heidt	Brock Montgomery	Matt Lang	Dustin Kidby	Kerrobert, Saskatchewan
Pascal Hess	Yves Hess	Florian Meister	Stefan Meienberg	Switzerland
Clint Dieno (fourth)	Jason Jacobson (skip)	Matt Froehlich	Chadd McKenzie	Saskatoon, Saskatchewan
Joel Jordison	Jason Ackerman	Brent Goeres	Curtis Horwath	Moose Jaw, Saskatchewan
Kevin Koe	Pat Simmons	Carter Rycroft	Nolan Thiessen	Edmonton, Alberta
Bruce Korte	Dean Kleiter	Roger Korte	Rob Markowsky	Saskatoon, Saskatchewan
Steve Laycock	Kirk Muyres	Colton Flasch	Dallan Muyres	Saskatoon, Saskatchewan
Sean Morris (fourth)	Mike Libbus (skip)	Brad MacInnis	Peter Keenan	Calgary, Alberta
Liu Rui	Xu Xiaoming	Zang Jialiang	Ba Dexin	Harbin, China
William Lyburn	James Kirkness	Alex Forrest	Tyler Forrest	Winnipeg, Manitoba
Kevin Marsh	Matt Ryback	Daniel Marsh	Aaron Shutra	Saskatoon, Saskatchewan
Kevin Martin	John Morris	Marc Kennedy	Ben Hebert	Edmonton, Alberta
Mike McEwen	B.J. Neufeld	Matt Wozniak	Denni Neufeld	Winnipeg, Manitoba
Rick McKague	Jim Moats	Doug McNish	Paul Strandlund	Edmonton, Alberta
Sven Michel	Claudio Pätz	Sandro Trolliet	Simon Gempeler	Adelboden, Switzerland
Yusuke Morozumi	Tsuyoshi Yamaguchi	Tetsuro Shimizu	Kosuke Morozumi	Karuizawa, Japan
Dan Petryk (fourth)	Steve Petryk (skip)	Roland Robinson	Thomas Usselman	Calgary, Alberta
Brady Scharback	Quinn Hersikorn	Jake Hersikorn	Brady Kendel	Saskatoon, Saskatchewan
Robert Schlender	Dean Ross	Don Bartlett	Chris Lemishka	Edmonton, Alberta
John Shuster	Jeff Isaacson	Jared Zezel	John Landsteiner	Duluth, Minnesota
Jeff Stoughton	Jon Mead	Reid Carruthers	Mark Nichols	Winnipeg, Manitoba
Brock Virtue	Braeden Moskowy	Chris Schille	D. J Kidby	Regina, Saskatchewan
Dustin Kalthoff (fourth)	Randy Woytowich (skip)	Lionel Holm	Lyndon Holm	Saskatoon, Saskatchewan
Zou Dejia	Chen Lu'an	Ji Yangsong	Li Guangxu	Harbin, China

== Knockout Brackets ==
=== A Event ===
First Knockout
(Ontario) John Epping	6
(Switzerland) Pascal Hess	4
(Alberta) Robert Schlender	10
(Saskatchewan) Josh Heidt	2
(Alberta) Mike Libbus	2
(Alberta) Brendan Bottcher	6
(Saskatchewan) Steve Laycock	3
(Manitoba) Jeff Stoughton	6
(British Columbia) Jim Cotter	7
(Saskatchewan) Brady Scharback	1
(Manitoba) William Lyburn	8
(Saskatchewan) Brock Virtue	7
(China) Zou Dejia	5
(Minnesota) Todd Birr	6
(Minnesota) Tyler George	6
(Manitoba) Mike McEwen	8

Quarterfinals
(Ontario) John Epping	3
(Alberta) Robert Schlender	5
(Alberta) Brendan Bottcher	3
(Manitoba) Jeff Stoughton	8
(British Columbia) Jim Cotter	6
(Manitoba) William Lyburn	7
(Minnesota) Todd Birr	2
(Manitoba) Mike McEwen	8

Semifinals
(Alberta) Robert Schlender	4
(Manitoba) Jeff Stoughton	6
(Manitoba) William Lyburn	6
(Manitoba) Mike McEwen	5

Qualifier 1
(Manitoba) Jeff Stoughton	3
(Manitoba) William Lyburn	5

First Knockout
(Alberta) Kevin Martin	2
(China) Liu Rui	1
(Saskatchewan) Bruce Korte	8
(Saskatchewan) Joel Jordison	3
(Japan) Yusuke Morozumi	8
(Saskatchewan) Jason Jacobson	7
(Alberta) Steve Petryk	8
(Switzerland) Sven Michel	1
(Manitoba) Rob Fowler	2
(Saskatchewan) Randy Woytowich	7
(Saskatchewan) Kevin Marsh	6
(Alberta) Rick McKague	7
(Saskatchewan) Scott Bitz	8
(Minnesota) John Shuster	7
(Switzerland) Peter de Cruz	4
(Alberta) Kevin Koe	8

Quarterfinals
(Alberta) Kevin Martin	9
(Saskatchewan) Bruce Korte	3
(Japan) Yusuke Morozumi	7
(Alberta) Steve Petryk	4
(Saskatchewan) Randy Woytowich	7
(Alberta) Rick McKague	3
(Saskatchewan) Scott Bitz	5
(Alberta) Kevin Koe	6

Semifinals
(Alberta) Kevin Martin	8
(Japan) Yusuke Morozumi	2
(Saskatchewan) Randy Woytowich	4
(Alberta) Kevin Koe	7

Qualifier 2
(Alberta) Kevin Martin	7
(Alberta) Kevin Koe	5

=== B Event ===
Second Knockout
(Switzerland) Pascal Hess	6
(Saskatchewan) Josh Heidt	4
(Alberta) Mike Libbus	5
(Saskatchewan) Steve Laycock	6

Quarterfinals
(British Columbia) Jim Cotter	6
(Switzerland) Pascal Hess	2
(Minnesota) Todd Birr	2
(Saskatchewan) Steve Laycock	8

Semifinals
(British Columbia) Jim Cotter	7
(Japan) Yusuke Morozumi	2
(Saskatchewan) Steve Laycock	8
(Saskatchewan) Randy Woytowich	3

To Qualifier 3
(British Columbia) Jim Cotter	3
(Saskatchewan) Steve Laycock	5

Second Knockout
(Saskatchewan) Brady Scharback	4
(Saskatchewan) Brock Virtue	5
(China) Zou Dejia	6
(Minnesota) Tyler George	5

Quarterfinals
(Ontario) John Epping	8
(Saskatchewan) Brock Virtue	3
(Alberta) Brendan Bottcher	6
(China) Zou Dejia	3

Semifinals
(Ontario) John Epping	8
(Alberta) Brendan Bottcher	5

To Qualifier 3
(Alberta) Kevin Koe	5
(Ontario) John Epping	4
Qualifier 3
(Saskatchewan) Steve Laycock	4
(Alberta) Kevin Koe	5

Second Knockout
(China) Liu Rui	6
(Saskatchewan) Joel Jordison	5
(Saskatchewan) Jason Jacobson	2
(Switzerland) Sven Michel	4

Quarterfinals
(Alberta) Rick McKague	5
(China) Liu Rui	6
(Saskatchewan) Scott Bitz	0
(Switzerland) Sven Michel	7

Semifinals
(China) Liu Rui	9
(Alberta) Robert Schlender	4
(Switzerland) Sven Michel	3
(Manitoba) Mike McEwen	1

To Qualifier 4
(China) Liu Rui	3
(Switzerland) Sven Michel	6

Second Knockout
(Manitoba) Rob Fowler	8
(Saskatchewan) Kevin Marsh	1
(Minnesota) John Shuster	6
(Switzerland) Peter de Cruz	7

Quarterfinals
(Saskatchewan) Bruce Korte	6
(Manitoba) Rob Fowler	5
(Alberta) Steve Petryk	5
(Switzerland) Peter de Cruz	4

Semifinals
(Saskatchewan) Bruce Korte	7
(Alberta) Steve Petryk	6

To Qualifier 4
(Manitoba) Jeff Stoughton	7
(Saskatchewan) Bruce Korte	4
Qualifier 4
(Switzerland) Sven Michel	4
(Manitoba) Jeff Stoughton	6

=== C Event ===
Third Knockout
(Saskatchewan) Josh Heidt	4
(Alberta) Mike Libbus	7
(Alberta) Rick McKague	7
(Saskatchewan) Scott Bitz	3

Quarterfinals
(Alberta) Robert Schlender	4
(Alberta) Mike Libbus	3
(Alberta) Steve Petryk	6
(Alberta) Rick McKague	7

Semifinals
(Alberta) Robert Schlender	5
(Alberta) Rick McKague	3

Qualifier 5
(Saskatchewan) Steve Laycock	5
(Alberta) Robert Schlender	4

Third Knockout
(Saskatchewan) Brady Scharback	6
(Minnesota) Tyler George	7

Quarterfinals
(Manitoba) Rob Fowler	8
(Switzerland) Peter de Cruz	4
(Manitoba) Mike McEwen	7
(Minnesota) Tyler George	3

Semifinals
(Ontario) John Epping	5
(Manitoba) Rob Fowler	4
(British Columbia) Jim Cotter	1
(Manitoba) Mike McEwen	7

Qualifier 6
(Ontario) John Epping	5
(Manitoba) Mike McEwen	3

Third Knockout
(Saskatchewan) Joel Jordison	5
(Saskatchewan) Jason Jacobson	6

Quarterfinals
(Saskatchewan) Randy Woytowich	2
(Saskatchewan) Jason Jacobson	7
(Saskatchewan) Brock Virtue	5
(China) Zou Dejia	7

Semifinals
(Saskatchewan) Bruce Korte	3
(Saskatchewan) Jason Jacobson	7
(China) Liu Rui	3
(China) Zou Dejia	8

Qualifier 7
(Saskatchewan) Jason Jacobson	5
(China) Zou Dejia	4

Third Knockout
(Switzerland) Pascal Hess	5
(Minnesota) Todd Birr	3
(Saskatchewan) Kevin Marsh	3
(Minnesota) John Shuster	6

Quarterfinals
(Alberta) Brendan Bottcher	7
(Switzerland) Pascal Hess	2
(Japan) Yusuke Morozumi	5
(Minnesota) John Shuster	7

Semifinals
(Alberta) Brendan Bottcher	3
(Minnesota) John Shuster	5

Qualifier 8
(Switzerland) Sven Michel	3
(Minnesota) John Shuster	7

== Playoffs ==
Quarterfinals
(Manitoba) William Lyburn	6
(Saskatchewan) Steve Laycock	5
(Manitoba) Jeff Stoughton	5
(Ontario) John Epping	7
(Alberta) Kevin Martin	6
(Saskatchewan) Jason Jacobson	4
(Alberta) Kevin Koe	5
(Minnesota) John Shuster	3

Semifinals
(Manitoba) William Lyburn	3
(Ontario) John Epping	5
(Alberta) Kevin Martin	4
(Alberta) Kevin Koe	5

Finals
(Ontario) John Epping	6
(Alberta) Kevin Koe	5
