= 2023 SaskTel Tankard =

Saskatchewan men's curling championship

- Host city: Estevan, Saskatchewan
- Arena: Affinity Place
- Dates: February 1–5
- Winner: Team Knapp
- Curling club: Highland CC, Regina
- Skip: Kelly Knapp
- Third: Brennen Jones
- Second: Mike Armstrong
- Lead: Trent Knapp
- Alternate: Dustin Kidby
- Coach: Brian McCusker
- Finalist: Steve Laycock

The 2023 SaskTel Tankard, the provincial men's curling championship for Saskatchewan, was held from February 1 to 5 at the Affinity Place in Estevan, Saskatchewan. The winning Kelly Knapp rink represented Saskatchewan at the 2023 Tim Hortons Brier in London, Ontario where they finished fourth in Pool A with a 4–4 record.

== Qualification process ==
| Qualification method | Berths | Qualifying team(s) |
|---|---|---|
| CTRS Leaders | 4 | Colton Flasch; Kody Hartung; Rylan Kleiter; Kelly Knapp |
| Sask CTRS Leaders | 4 | Daymond Bernath; Michael Carss; Jason Jacobson; Steve Laycock |
| Last Chance Qualifier | 4 | Logan Ede; Josh Heidt; Dustin Kalthoff; Dallan Muyres |

== Teams ==
The teams are listed as follows:

| Skip | Third | Second | Lead | Alternate | Club |
|---|---|---|---|---|---|
| Daymond Bernath | Bryden Tessier | David Baum | Jack Reid | | Sutherland CC, Saskatoon |
| Michael Carss | Samuel Wills | Aaron Shutra | Mat Ring | | Nutana CC, Saskatoon |
| Logan Ede | Brayden Grindheim | Michael Hom | Austin Krupski | | Martensville CC, Martensville |
| Colton Flasch | Catlin Schneider | Kevin Marsh | Dan Marsh | | Nutana CC, Saskatoon |
| Kody Hartung | Tyler Hartung | Brady Scharback | Brady Kendel | | Sutherland CC, Saskatoon |
| Josh Heidt | Drew Heidt | Matt Lang | Tyler Gamble | | Kerrobert CC, Kerrobert |
| Jason Jacobson | Jason Ackerman | Jacob Hersikorn | Quinn Hersikorn | Darrell McKee | Nutana CC, Saskatoon |
| Dustin Kalthoff | Braden Fleischhacker | Jayden Bindig | Nathen Pomedli | Verne Anderson | Nutana CC, Saskatoon |
| Rylan Kleiter | Joshua Mattern | Trevor Johnson | Matthieu Taillon | | Nutana CC, Saskatoon |
| Kelly Knapp | Brennen Jones | Mike Armstrong | Trent Knapp | Dustin Kidby | Highland CC, Regina |
| Steve Laycock | Shaun Meachem | Chris Haichert | Brayden Stewart | | Swift Current CC, Swift Current |
| Dallan Muyres | Garret Springer | Jordan Tardi | Dustin Mikush | | Nutana CC, Saskatoon |

== Knockout brackets ==
=== A event ===
First Knockout | Qualifier 1
Colton Flasch | 9
Jason Jacobson | 7 | Jason Jacobson | 4
Dallan Muyres | 3 | Colton Flasch | 8
Kody Hartung | 2
Kody Hartung | 8
Michael Carss | 7 | Dustin Kalthoff | 6
Dustin Kalthoff | 9 | Colton Flasch | 4
Kelly Knapp | 9
Kelly Knapp | 9
Daymond Bernath | 8 | Daymond Bernath | 7
Josh Heidt | 4 | Kelly Knapp | 9
Steve Laycock | 7
Rylan Kleiter | 5
Steve Laycock | 8 | Steve Laycock | 8
Logan Ede | 4

=== B event ===
Second Knockout | Qualifier 2
Dallan Muyres | 1
Dustin Kalthoff | 7 | Dustin Kalthoff | 4
Steve Laycock | 5
Steve Laycock | 8
Daymond Bernath | 3 | Kody Hartung | 2
Michael Carss | 7 | Michael Carss | 4
Kody Hartung | 8
Steve Laycock | 10
Josh Heidt | 3 | Jason Jacobson | 4
Rylan Kleiter | 7 | Rylan Kleiter | 3
Logan Ede | 4 | Jason Jacobson | 8
Jason Jacobson | 7 | Jason Jacobson | 9
Colton Flasch | 5

=== C event ===
| Third Knockout | | | | Qualifier 3 |
| | | Colton Flasch | 8 |
| Dallan Muyres | 9 | Dallan Muyres | 9 |
| Daymond Bernath | 4 | | | Dallan Muyres | 3 |
| | | | | Kody Hartung | 9 |
| | | Rylan Kleiter | 3 |
| | | Kody Hartung | 6 |

Third Knockout | Qualifier 4
Josh Heidt | 7
Jason Jacobson | 10
Dustin Kalthoff | 5
Josh Heidt | 5 | Josh Heidt | 4
Logan Ede | 4
Logan Ede | 9
Michael Carss | 7

== Knockout results ==
All draw times listed in Central Time (UTC−06:00).

=== Draw 1 ===
Wednesday, February 1, 7:30 pm

| Sheet 1 | 1 | 2 | 3 | 4 | 5 | 6 | 7 | 8 | 9 | 10 | Final |
|---|---|---|---|---|---|---|---|---|---|---|---|
| Michael Carss | 1 | 0 | 2 | 0 | 2 | 0 | 2 | 0 | 0 | 0 | 7 |
| Dustin Kalthoff 🔨 | 0 | 2 | 0 | 3 | 0 | 1 | 0 | 1 | 1 | 1 | 9 |

| Sheet 2 | 1 | 2 | 3 | 4 | 5 | 6 | 7 | 8 | 9 | 10 | Final |
|---|---|---|---|---|---|---|---|---|---|---|---|
| Daymond Bernath | 0 | 0 | 1 | 0 | 0 | 2 | 2 | 2 | 1 | X | 8 |
| Josh Heidt 🔨 | 0 | 1 | 0 | 2 | 1 | 0 | 0 | 0 | 0 | X | 4 |

| Sheet 3 | 1 | 2 | 3 | 4 | 5 | 6 | 7 | 8 | 9 | 10 | Final |
|---|---|---|---|---|---|---|---|---|---|---|---|
| Jason Jacobson | 2 | 0 | 0 | 1 | 0 | 0 | 2 | 1 | 1 | X | 7 |
| Dallan Muyres 🔨 | 0 | 1 | 0 | 0 | 2 | 0 | 0 | 0 | 0 | X | 3 |

| Sheet 4 | 1 | 2 | 3 | 4 | 5 | 6 | 7 | 8 | 9 | 10 | Final |
|---|---|---|---|---|---|---|---|---|---|---|---|
| Steve Laycock | 0 | 2 | 0 | 0 | 2 | 0 | 0 | 2 | 2 | X | 8 |
| Logan Ede 🔨 | 1 | 0 | 1 | 1 | 0 | 1 | 0 | 0 | 0 | X | 4 |

=== Draw 2 ===
Thursday, February 2, 9:00 am

| Sheet 1 | 1 | 2 | 3 | 4 | 5 | 6 | 7 | 8 | 9 | 10 | Final |
|---|---|---|---|---|---|---|---|---|---|---|---|
| Jason Jacobson 🔨 | 1 | 1 | 1 | 0 | 0 | 0 | 0 | 1 | 0 | X | 4 |
| Colton Flasch | 0 | 0 | 0 | 1 | 1 | 1 | 3 | 0 | 3 | X | 9 |

| Sheet 2 | 1 | 2 | 3 | 4 | 5 | 6 | 7 | 8 | 9 | 10 | Final |
|---|---|---|---|---|---|---|---|---|---|---|---|
| Rylan Kleiter | 0 | 0 | 0 | 0 | 1 | 2 | 0 | 2 | 0 | 0 | 5 |
| Steve Laycock 🔨 | 0 | 1 | 1 | 1 | 0 | 0 | 3 | 0 | 1 | 1 | 8 |

| Sheet 3 | 1 | 2 | 3 | 4 | 5 | 6 | 7 | 8 | 9 | 10 | Final |
|---|---|---|---|---|---|---|---|---|---|---|---|
| Kody Hartung 🔨 | 4 | 0 | 0 | 1 | 1 | 0 | 0 | 0 | 2 | X | 8 |
| Dustin Kalthoff | 0 | 2 | 0 | 0 | 0 | 0 | 3 | 1 | 0 | X | 6 |

| Sheet 4 | 1 | 2 | 3 | 4 | 5 | 6 | 7 | 8 | 9 | 10 | Final |
|---|---|---|---|---|---|---|---|---|---|---|---|
| Kelly Knapp | 0 | 0 | 0 | 0 | 3 | 2 | 0 | 2 | 1 | 1 | 9 |
| Daymond Bernath 🔨 | 0 | 1 | 2 | 2 | 0 | 0 | 2 | 0 | 0 | 0 | 7 |

=== Draw 3 ===
Thursday, February 2, 3:00 pm

| Sheet 2 | 1 | 2 | 3 | 4 | 5 | 6 | 7 | 8 | 9 | 10 | Final |
|---|---|---|---|---|---|---|---|---|---|---|---|
| Michael Carss 🔨 | 0 | 3 | 0 | 0 | 3 | 0 | 1 | 0 | X | X | 7 |
| Daymond Bernath | 0 | 0 | 1 | 0 | 0 | 1 | 0 | 1 | X | X | 3 |

| Sheet 4 | 1 | 2 | 3 | 4 | 5 | 6 | 7 | 8 | 9 | 10 | Final |
|---|---|---|---|---|---|---|---|---|---|---|---|
| Dallan Muyres 🔨 | 0 | 0 | 0 | 0 | 0 | 0 | 1 | 0 | 0 | X | 1 |
| Dustin Kalthoff | 0 | 0 | 0 | 0 | 1 | 3 | 0 | 2 | 1 | X | 7 |

=== Draw 4 ===
Thursday, February 2, 7:30 pm

| Sheet 1 | 1 | 2 | 3 | 4 | 5 | 6 | 7 | 8 | 9 | 10 | Final |
|---|---|---|---|---|---|---|---|---|---|---|---|
| Josh Heidt 🔨 | 1 | 0 | 0 | 0 | 1 | 0 | 0 | 1 | X | X | 3 |
| Rylan Kleiter | 0 | 1 | 2 | 1 | 0 | 3 | 0 | 0 | X | X | 7 |

| Sheet 2 | 1 | 2 | 3 | 4 | 5 | 6 | 7 | 8 | 9 | 10 | Final |
|---|---|---|---|---|---|---|---|---|---|---|---|
| Logan Ede 🔨 | 1 | 0 | 0 | 1 | 0 | 1 | 0 | 1 | 0 | X | 4 |
| Jason Jacobson | 0 | 1 | 0 | 0 | 1 | 0 | 3 | 0 | 2 | X | 7 |

| Sheet 3 | 1 | 2 | 3 | 4 | 5 | 6 | 7 | 8 | 9 | 10 | Final |
|---|---|---|---|---|---|---|---|---|---|---|---|
| Kelly Knapp | 0 | 1 | 0 | 1 | 0 | 1 | 2 | 2 | 0 | 2 | 9 |
| Steve Laycock 🔨 | 2 | 0 | 0 | 0 | 4 | 0 | 0 | 0 | 1 | 0 | 7 |

| Sheet 4 | 1 | 2 | 3 | 4 | 5 | 6 | 7 | 8 | 9 | 10 | Final |
|---|---|---|---|---|---|---|---|---|---|---|---|
| Colton Flasch | 0 | 0 | 1 | 0 | 0 | 2 | 5 | X | X | X | 8 |
| Kody Hartung 🔨 | 0 | 1 | 0 | 1 | 0 | 0 | 0 | X | X | X | 2 |

=== Draw 5 ===
Friday, February 3, 10:00 am

| Sheet 1 | 1 | 2 | 3 | 4 | 5 | 6 | 7 | 8 | 9 | 10 | Final |
|---|---|---|---|---|---|---|---|---|---|---|---|
| Dustin Kalthoff | 0 | 0 | 1 | 0 | 1 | 1 | 0 | 0 | 1 | 0 | 4 |
| Steve Laycock 🔨 | 1 | 0 | 0 | 2 | 0 | 0 | 0 | 1 | 0 | 1 | 5 |

| Sheet 3 | 1 | 2 | 3 | 4 | 5 | 6 | 7 | 8 | 9 | 10 | Final |
|---|---|---|---|---|---|---|---|---|---|---|---|
| Kody Hartung | 0 | 2 | 0 | 1 | 0 | 3 | 0 | 0 | 2 | X | 8 |
| Michael Carss 🔨 | 0 | 0 | 0 | 0 | 3 | 0 | 1 | 0 | 0 | X | 4 |

=== Draw 6 ===
Friday, February 3, 3:00 pm

| Sheet 1 | 1 | 2 | 3 | 4 | 5 | 6 | 7 | 8 | 9 | 10 | Final |
|---|---|---|---|---|---|---|---|---|---|---|---|
| Dallan Muyres 🔨 | 0 | 2 | 0 | 2 | 0 | 2 | 0 | 1 | 2 | X | 9 |
| Daymond Bernath | 0 | 0 | 1 | 0 | 1 | 0 | 2 | 0 | 0 | X | 4 |

| Sheet 2 | 1 | 2 | 3 | 4 | 5 | 6 | 7 | 8 | 9 | 10 | Final |
|---|---|---|---|---|---|---|---|---|---|---|---|
| Colton Flasch 🔨 | 1 | 0 | 1 | 0 | 0 | 1 | 1 | 0 | 0 | X | 4 |
| Kelly Knapp | 0 | 2 | 0 | 3 | 2 | 0 | 0 | 1 | 1 | X | 9 |

| Sheet 3 | 1 | 2 | 3 | 4 | 5 | 6 | 7 | 8 | 9 | 10 | Final |
|---|---|---|---|---|---|---|---|---|---|---|---|
| Rylan Kleiter | 0 | 0 | 0 | 1 | 1 | 0 | 0 | 1 | 0 | X | 3 |
| Jason Jacobson 🔨 | 0 | 0 | 0 | 0 | 0 | 3 | 0 | 0 | 5 | X | 8 |

=== Draw 7 ===
Friday, February 3, 7:30 pm

| Sheet 1 | 1 | 2 | 3 | 4 | 5 | 6 | 7 | 8 | 9 | 10 | Final |
|---|---|---|---|---|---|---|---|---|---|---|---|
| Logan Ede | 0 | 2 | 0 | 1 | 0 | 4 | 0 | 1 | 0 | 1 | 9 |
| Michael Carss 🔨 | 4 | 0 | 0 | 0 | 1 | 0 | 2 | 0 | 0 | 0 | 7 |

| Sheet 2 | 1 | 2 | 3 | 4 | 5 | 6 | 7 | 8 | 9 | 10 | Final |
|---|---|---|---|---|---|---|---|---|---|---|---|
| Steve Laycock 🔨 | 0 | 2 | 0 | 2 | 0 | 1 | 3 | X | X | X | 8 |
| Kody Hartung | 0 | 0 | 1 | 0 | 1 | 0 | 0 | X | X | X | 2 |

| Sheet 3 | 1 | 2 | 3 | 4 | 5 | 6 | 7 | 8 | 9 | 10 | Final |
|---|---|---|---|---|---|---|---|---|---|---|---|
| Josh Heidt 🔨 | 0 | 2 | 0 | 1 | 0 | 2 | 0 | 1 | 1 | 0 | 7 |
| Dustin Kalthoff | 1 | 0 | 1 | 0 | 1 | 0 | 1 | 0 | 0 | 1 | 5 |

| Sheet 4 | 1 | 2 | 3 | 4 | 5 | 6 | 7 | 8 | 9 | 10 | Final |
|---|---|---|---|---|---|---|---|---|---|---|---|
| Jason Jacobson 🔨 | 0 | 1 | 0 | 3 | 1 | 0 | 1 | 0 | 3 | X | 9 |
| Colton Flasch | 1 | 0 | 2 | 0 | 0 | 1 | 0 | 1 | 0 | X | 5 |

=== Draw 8 ===
Saturday, February 4, 10:00 am

| Sheet 1 | 1 | 2 | 3 | 4 | 5 | 6 | 7 | 8 | 9 | 10 | Final |
|---|---|---|---|---|---|---|---|---|---|---|---|
| Kody Hartung 🔨 | 0 | 0 | 2 | 0 | 3 | 0 | 0 | 0 | 1 | X | 6 |
| Rylan Kleiter | 0 | 0 | 0 | 1 | 0 | 2 | 0 | 0 | 0 | X | 3 |

| Sheet 2 | 1 | 2 | 3 | 4 | 5 | 6 | 7 | 8 | 9 | 10 | Final |
|---|---|---|---|---|---|---|---|---|---|---|---|
| Colton Flasch 🔨 | 1 | 0 | 1 | 0 | 3 | 0 | 0 | 3 | 0 | 0 | 8 |
| Dallan Muyres | 0 | 2 | 0 | 1 | 0 | 2 | 1 | 0 | 2 | 1 | 9 |

| Sheet 3 | 1 | 2 | 3 | 4 | 5 | 6 | 7 | 8 | 9 | 10 | Final |
|---|---|---|---|---|---|---|---|---|---|---|---|
| Jason Jacobson 🔨 | 0 | 2 | 0 | 0 | 2 | 0 | X | X | X | X | 4 |
| Steve Laycock | 3 | 0 | 2 | 1 | 0 | 4 | X | X | X | X | 10 |

| Sheet 4 | 1 | 2 | 3 | 4 | 5 | 6 | 7 | 8 | 9 | 10 | 11 | Final |
|---|---|---|---|---|---|---|---|---|---|---|---|---|
| Logan Ede 🔨 | 0 | 0 | 0 | 1 | 0 | 1 | 0 | 0 | 1 | 1 | 0 | 4 |
| Josh Heidt | 0 | 1 | 1 | 0 | 1 | 0 | 0 | 1 | 0 | 0 | 1 | 5 |

=== Draw 9 ===
Saturday, February 4, 3:00 pm

| Sheet 2 | 1 | 2 | 3 | 4 | 5 | 6 | 7 | 8 | 9 | 10 | Final |
|---|---|---|---|---|---|---|---|---|---|---|---|
| Josh Heidt | 0 | 0 | 0 | 2 | 0 | 2 | 0 | 0 | X | X | 4 |
| Jason Jacobson 🔨 | 0 | 2 | 1 | 0 | 1 | 0 | 2 | 4 | X | X | 10 |

| Sheet 3 | 1 | 2 | 3 | 4 | 5 | 6 | 7 | 8 | 9 | 10 | Final |
|---|---|---|---|---|---|---|---|---|---|---|---|
| Dallan Muyres | 0 | 0 | 2 | 0 | 0 | 0 | 1 | 0 | X | X | 3 |
| Kody Hartung 🔨 | 0 | 2 | 0 | 1 | 0 | 3 | 0 | 3 | X | X | 9 |

== Playoffs ==
Page playoff system
A | Kelly Knapp | 9
B | Steve Laycock | 4
C1 | Kody Hartung | 3
C2 | Jason Jacobson | 8

Semifinal
B | Steve Laycock | 11
C2 | Jason Jacobson | 8

Final
A | Kelly Knapp | 5
B | Steve Laycock | 4

=== A vs. B ===
Saturday, February 4, 7:30 pm

| Sheet 2 | 1 | 2 | 3 | 4 | 5 | 6 | 7 | 8 | 9 | 10 | Final |
|---|---|---|---|---|---|---|---|---|---|---|---|
| Kelly Knapp 🔨 | 0 | 2 | 2 | 0 | 3 | 1 | 0 | 1 | X | X | 9 |
| Steve Laycock | 1 | 0 | 0 | 1 | 0 | 0 | 2 | 0 | X | X | 4 |

=== C1 vs. C2 ===
Saturday, February 4, 7:30 pm

| Sheet 4 | 1 | 2 | 3 | 4 | 5 | 6 | 7 | 8 | 9 | 10 | Final |
|---|---|---|---|---|---|---|---|---|---|---|---|
| Kody Hartung | 0 | 1 | 0 | 0 | 1 | 1 | 0 | 0 | X | X | 3 |
| Jason Jacobson 🔨 | 3 | 0 | 1 | 2 | 0 | 0 | 0 | 2 | X | X | 8 |

=== Semifinal ===
Sunday, February 5, 10:00 am

| Sheet 3 | 1 | 2 | 3 | 4 | 5 | 6 | 7 | 8 | 9 | 10 | Final |
|---|---|---|---|---|---|---|---|---|---|---|---|
| Steve Laycock 🔨 | 0 | 2 | 1 | 0 | 1 | 0 | 2 | 1 | 0 | 4 | 11 |
| Jason Jacobson | 0 | 0 | 0 | 2 | 0 | 4 | 0 | 0 | 2 | 0 | 8 |

=== Final ===
Sunday, February 5, 3:00 pm

| Sheet 2 | 1 | 2 | 3 | 4 | 5 | 6 | 7 | 8 | 9 | 10 | Final |
|---|---|---|---|---|---|---|---|---|---|---|---|
| Kelly Knapp 🔨 | 0 | 0 | 1 | 0 | 1 | 0 | 0 | 2 | 0 | 1 | 5 |
| Steve Laycock | 0 | 0 | 0 | 2 | 0 | 1 | 0 | 0 | 1 | 0 | 4 |

2023 SaskTel Tankard

Kelly Knapp
1st Saskatchewan Provincial Championship title
