= 2017 SaskTel Tankard =

- Host city: Tisdale, Saskatchewan
- Arena: Tisdale RecPlex
- Dates: February 1–5
- Winner: Team Casey
- Curling club: Highland CC, Regina
- Skip: Adam Casey
- Third: Catlin Schneider
- Second: Shaun Meachem
- Lead: Dustin Kidby
- Finalist: Steve Laycock

The 2017 SaskTel Tankard, the provincial men's curling championship for Saskatchewan, was held from February 1 to 5 at the Tisdale RecPlex in Tisdale, Saskatchewan. The winning Adam Casey team represented Saskatchewan at the 2017 Tim Hortons Brier in St. John's, Newfoundland and Labrador.

== Teams ==
The teams are listed as follows:

| Skip | Third | Second | Lead | Locale(s) |
|---|---|---|---|---|
| Jason Ackerman | Curtis Horwath | Brent Goeres | Scott Deck | Highland Curling Club, Regina |
| Ryan Armstrong | Tyson Armstrong | Allen Dmytryshyn | Mike Robson | Lashburn Curling Club, Lashburn |
| Scott Bitz | Jeff Sharp | Aryn Scmhidt | Dean Kleiter | Sutherland Curling Club, Saskatoon |
| Randy Bryden | Troy Robinson | Brock Montgomery | Trent Knapp | Callie Curling Club, Regina |
| Adam Casey | Catlin Schneider | Shaun Meachem | Dustin Kidby | Highland Curling Club, Regina |
| Dale Craig | Cory Fleming | Dustin Phillips | Grant Scheirich | Nutana Curling Club, Saskatoon |
| Carl deConinck Smith | Jeff Sharp | Matt Ryback | Mark Larsen | Rosetown Curling Club, Rosetown |
| Ryan Deis | Scott Manners | Jason McPhee | Kalin Deis | Fox Valley Curling Club, Fox Valley |
| Brent Gedak | Clint Dieno | Derek Owens | Shawn Meyer | Estevan Curling Club, Estevan |
| Kody Hartung | Josh Heidt | Tyler Hartung | Kelly Knapp | Nutana Curling Club, Saskatoon |
| Brad Heidt | Mark Lang | Glen Heitt | Dan Ormsby | Kerrobert Curling Club, Kerrobert |
| Drew Heidt | Jesse St. John | Cole Tenetuik | Chadd McKenzie | Twin Rivers Curling Club, North Battleford |
| Jason Jacobson | Dustin Kalthoff | Nicklas Neufeld | Rory Golanowski | Nutana Curling Club, Saskatoon |
| Bruce Korte | Kevin Marsh | Dan Marsh | Matthew Lang | Nutana Curling Club, Saskatoon |
| Steve Laycock | Kirk Muyres | Colton Flasch | Dallan Muyres | Nutana Curling Club, Saskatoon |
| Brady Scharback | Jake Hersikorn | Quinn Hersikorn | Brady Kendel | Nutana Curling Club, Saskatoon |

== Knockout Draw Brackets ==
=== A Event ===
First Knockout
Laycock | 9
Armstrong | 3
Gedak | 3
B. Heidt | 5
Deis | 5
Jacobson | 3
Scharback | 4
Hartung | 8
Casey | 7
Bitz | 3
deConinck Smith | 9
Ackerman | 8
Bryden | 4
D. Heidt | 6
Craig | 8
Korte | 7

Quarterfinals
Layock | 7
B. Heidt | 1
Deis | 6
Hartung | 8
Casey | 5
deConinck Smith | 4
D. Heidt | 3
Craig | 9

Semifinals
Laycock | 6
Hartung | 5
Casey | 6
Craig | 5

Qualifier 1
Laycock | 6
Casey | 5

=== B Event ===
Second Knockout
Armstrong | 5
Gedak | 9
Bitz | 8
Ackerman | 0

Quarterfinals
Deis | 2
Gedak | 7
D. Heidt | 2
Bitz | 7

Semifinals
Gedak | 6
Craig | 4
Bitz | 4
Hartung | 5

To Qualifier 2
Gedak | 6
Hartung | 7
Qualifier 2
Hartung | 3
Casey | 11

Second Knockout
Jacobson | 6
Scharback | 4
Bryden | 7
Korte | 9

Quarterfinals
B. Heidt | 4
Jacobson | 8
deConinck Smith | 5
Korte | 6

Semifinals
Jacobson | 7
Korte | 6

To Qualifier 2
Jacobson | 5
Casey | 8

=== C Event ===
Third Knockout
Armstrong | 2
Scharback | 7
Deis | 5
D. Heidt | 8

Quarterfinals
Scharback | 7
Bitz | 9
D. Heidt | 3
Korte | 4

Semifinals
Bitz | 5
Jacobson | 7
Korte | 7
Gedak | 5

Qualifier 3
Jacobson | 7
Korte | 10

Third Knockout
Ackerman | 7
Bryden | 6

Quarterfinals
Craig | 8
Ackerman | 9
Heidt | 5
deConinck Smith | 9

Semifinals
Ackerman | 5
deConinck Smith | 4

Qualifier 4
Ackerman | 5
Hartung | 10

== Playoffs ==
Page playoff system
1 | Steve Laycock | 5
2 | Adam Casey | 8
3 | Bruce Korte | 4
4 | Kody Hartung | 3

Semifinal
1 | Steve Laycock | 7
3 | Bruce Korte | 6

Final
2 | Adam Casey | 11
1 | Steve Laycock | 3

=== 1 vs 2 ===
| Team | 1 | 2 | 3 | 4 | 5 | 6 | 7 | 8 | 9 | 10 | Final |
|---|---|---|---|---|---|---|---|---|---|---|---|
| Steve Laycock | 0 | 2 | 1 | 0 | 1 | 0 | 1 | 0 | 0 | X | 5 |
| Adam Casey | 1 | 0 | 0 | 2 | 0 | 1 | 0 | 3 | 1 | X | 8 |

=== 3 vs 4 ===
| Team | 1 | 2 | 3 | 4 | 5 | 6 | 7 | 8 | 9 | 10 | Final |
|---|---|---|---|---|---|---|---|---|---|---|---|
| Bruce Korte | 1 | 0 | 1 | 0 | 0 | 1 | 0 | 2 | 0 | X | 5 |
| Kody Hartung | 0 | 1 | 0 | 0 | 0 | 0 | 1 | 0 | 1 | X | 3 |

=== Semifinal ===
| Team | 1 | 2 | 3 | 4 | 5 | 6 | 7 | 8 | 9 | 10 | 11 | Final |
|---|---|---|---|---|---|---|---|---|---|---|---|---|
| Steve Laycock | 0 | 0 | 2 | 0 | 1 | 0 | 1 | 0 | 2 | 0 | 1 | 7 |
| Bruce Korte | 0 | 0 | 0 | 1 | 0 | 2 | 0 | 1 | 0 | 2 | 0 | 6 |

=== Final ===
| Team | 1 | 2 | 3 | 4 | 5 | 6 | 7 | 8 | 9 | 10 | Final |
|---|---|---|---|---|---|---|---|---|---|---|---|
| Steve Laycock | 0 | 1 | 0 | 0 | 1 | 0 | 1 | 0 | X | X | 3 |
| Adam Casey | 3 | 0 | 3 | 3 | 0 | 0 | 0 | 2 | X | X | 11 |

2017 SaskTel Tankard

Adam Casey
1st Saskatchewan Provincial Championship title
