= 2025 SaskTel Tankard =

Canadian provincial men's curling championship

- Host city: Kindersley, Saskatchewan
- Arena: Kindersley West Central Events Centre
- Dates: January 21–26
- Winner: Team Kleiter
- Curling club: Nutana CC, Saskatoon
- Skip: Rylan Kleiter
- Third: Joshua Mattern
- Second: Matthew Hall
- Lead: Trevor Johnson
- Coach: Dean Kleiter
- Finalist: Team Laycock

The 2025 SaskTel Tankard, the provincial men's curling championship for Saskatchewan, was held from January 21 to 26 at the Kindersley West Central Events Centre in Kindersley, Saskatchewan. The winning Rylan Kleiter represented Saskatchewan at the 2025 Montana's Brier in Kelowna, British Columbia. The event was held in conjunction with the 2025 Viterra Prairie Pinnacle, the provincial women's championship. This is the first time that both the men's and women's provincial championships have been held in conjunction.

With the reduction of the number of teams from 12 to 9, the round robin portion will now be a single round robin instead of two pools of six teams that was used the previous year with the top four teams advancing to the page playoff.

== Qualification process ==
Qualification method	Berths	Qualifying team(s)
CTRS Leaders	3	Rylan Kleiter; Kelly Knapp; Dustin Kalthoff
SaskCTRS Leaders	3	Jason Jacobson; Logan Ede; Brad Moser
Last Chance Qualifier	3	Steve Laycock; Charley Thomas; Dylan Derksen

== Teams ==
The teams are listed as follows:

Skip	Third	Second	Lead	Alternate	Coach	Club
Dylan Derksen	Brecklin Gervais	Tyler Derksen	Gavin Martens		Garnet Zummack	Martensville CC, Martensville
Logan Ede	Matthew Drewitz	Dustin Mikush	Brayden Heistad		Patrick Ackerman	Martensville CC, Martensville
Jason Jacobson	Jason Ackerman	Jacob Hersikorn	Quinn Hersikorn	Brent Gedak		Nutana CC, Saskatoon
Dustin Kalthoff	Josh Heidt	– (Note: Team Kalthoff played with three players.)	Mat Ring			Nutana CC, Saskatoon
Rylan Kleiter	Joshua Mattern	Matthew Hall	Trevor Johnson		Dean Kleiter	Nutana CC, Saskatoon
Kelly Knapp	Brennen Jones	Mike Armstrong	Trent Knapp	Dustin Kidby	Brian McCusker	Highland CC, Regina
Steve Laycock (Fourth)	Shaun Meachem (Skip)	Chris Haichert	Brayden Grindheim			Swift Current CC, Swift Current
Brad Moser	Bryden Tessier	David Baum	Cole Macknak	Darren Camm		Nutana CC, Saskatoon
Charley Thomas	Tyler Hartung	Jayden Shwaga	Matt Lang			Langenburg CC, Langenburg

== Round robin standings ==
Final Round Robin Standings

Key
Teams to Playoffs

Skip	W	L	W–L	PF	PA	EW	EL	BE	SE
Team Laycock	7	1	–	66	40	39	29	3	10
Dustin Kalthoff	6	2	–	47	37	30	26	9	5
Rylan Kleiter	5	3	1–0	52	43	35	28	2	14
Kelly Knapp	5	3	0–1	59	48	35	31	8	8
Dylan Derksen	4	4	–	51	59	33	33	3	11
Charley Thomas	3	5	1–0	44	47	27	31	7	7
Jason Jacobson	3	5	0–1	52	55	33	31	2	8
Logan Ede	2	6	–	38	56	28	36	6	8
Brad Moser	1	7	–	41	65	22	37	6	1

== Round robin results ==
All draw times listed in Central Time (UTC−06:00).

=== Draw 1 ===
Tuesday, January 21, 12:00 pm

Sheet 1	1	2	3	4	5	6	7	8	9	10	Final
Team Laycock 🔨	0	0	2	0	1	0	1	3	3	X	10
Logan Ede	0	0	0	1	0	1	0	0	0	X	2

Sheet 2	1	2	3	4	5	6	7	8	9	10	11	Final
Kelly Knapp 🔨	0	0	2	0	1	0	1	1	0	0	1	6
Dustin Kalthoff	0	1	0	1	0	2	0	0	0	1	0	5

Sheet 3	1	2	3	4	5	6	7	8	9	10	Final
Rylan Kleiter	0	1	0	0	1	1	0	2	0	2	7
Brad Moser 🔨	0	0	0	3	0	0	1	0	2	0	6

Sheet 4	1	2	3	4	5	6	7	8	9	10	Final
Charley Thomas 🔨	0	0	0	2	0	1	0	2	1	X	6
Jason Jacobson	0	0	1	0	1	0	0	0	0	X	2

=== Draw 2 ===
Tuesday, January 21, 8:00 pm

Sheet 1	1	2	3	4	5	6	7	8	9	10	Final
Charley Thomas 🔨	0	3	0	0	2	0	0	2	0	0	7
Dylan Derksen	2	0	2	0	0	0	2	0	1	1	8

Sheet 2	1	2	3	4	5	6	7	8	9	10	Final
Rylan Kleiter 🔨	3	0	2	0	3	0	0	1	0	X	9
Jason Jacobson	0	1	0	2	0	1	0	0	1	X	5

Sheet 3	1	2	3	4	5	6	7	8	9	10	Final
Dustin Kalthoff	0	0	2	0	1	1	0	X	X	X	4
Team Laycock 🔨	3	1	0	4	0	0	2	X	X	X	10

Sheet 4	1	2	3	4	5	6	7	8	9	10	11	Final
Kelly Knapp	0	0	0	1	1	0	3	0	1	0	2	8
Logan Ede 🔨	1	0	0	0	0	2	0	1	0	2	0	6

=== Draw 3 ===
Wednesday, January 22, 12:00 pm

Sheet 1	1	2	3	4	5	6	7	8	9	10	Final
Rylan Kleiter	0	0	0	2	0	1	0	0	1	0	4
Dustin Kalthoff 🔨	0	0	2	0	0	0	0	2	0	1	5

Sheet 2	1	2	3	4	5	6	7	8	9	10	Final
Charley Thomas	0	2	0	0	1	0	2	0	0	X	5
Team Laycock 🔨	1	0	2	1	0	1	0	3	1	X	9

Sheet 3	1	2	3	4	5	6	7	8	9	10	Final
Jason Jacobson 🔨	2	0	1	0	1	1	2	0	1	X	8
Logan Ede	0	1	0	1	0	0	0	1	0	X	3

Sheet 4	1	2	3	4	5	6	7	8	9	10	Final
Brad Moser	3	0	2	0	4	0	2	X	X	X	11
Dylan Derksen 🔨	0	2	0	1	0	1	0	X	X	X	4

=== Draw 4 ===
Wednesday, January 22, 8:00 pm

Sheet 1	1	2	3	4	5	6	7	8	9	10	Final
Team Laycock 🔨	3	0	0	2	0	0	3	0	1	X	9
Jason Jacobson	0	1	1	0	1	1	0	2	0	X	6

Sheet 2	1	2	3	4	5	6	7	8	9	10	Final
Brad Moser 🔨	2	0	0	0	0	0	2	0	2	0	6
Logan Ede	0	3	1	0	0	1	0	2	0	1	8

Sheet 3	1	2	3	4	5	6	7	8	9	10	Final
Kelly Knapp	0	1	0	3	0	0	0	2	2	0	8
Dylan Derksen 🔨	2	0	2	0	3	1	1	0	0	1	10

Sheet 4	1	2	3	4	5	6	7	8	9	10	Final
Rylan Kleiter	0	0	0	2	1	1	1	0	0	3	8
Charley Thomas 🔨	0	0	2	0	0	0	0	1	1	0	4

=== Draw 5 ===
Thursday, January 23, 8:00 am

Sheet 1	1	2	3	4	5	6	7	8	9	10	Final
Kelly Knapp 🔨	2	3	0	0	4	0	1	X	X	X	10
Brad Moser	0	0	0	2	0	0	0	X	X	X	2

Sheet 2	1	2	3	4	5	6	7	8	9	10	Final
Jason Jacobson 🔨	0	0	2	1	0	3	1	0	2	X	9
Dylan Derksen	2	1	0	0	1	0	0	1	0	X	5

Sheet 3	1	2	3	4	5	6	7	8	9	10	11	Final
Rylan Kleiter	0	2	0	1	1	0	0	1	0	1	0	6
Team Laycock 🔨	1	0	2	0	0	1	1	0	1	0	1	7

Sheet 4	1	2	3	4	5	6	7	8	9	10	Final
Dustin Kalthoff	0	1	0	1	2	0	0	0	0	1	5
Logan Ede 🔨	1	0	0	0	0	0	0	1	1	0	3

=== Draw 6 ===
Thursday, January 23, 4:00 pm

Sheet 1	1	2	3	4	5	6	7	8	9	10	Final
Rylan Kleiter 🔨	1	1	1	0	0	3	1	0	1	X	8
Logan Ede	0	0	0	0	2	0	0	2	0	X	4

Sheet 2	1	2	3	4	5	6	7	8	9	10	Final
Dustin Kalthoff 🔨	0	2	0	1	0	2	1	0	1	X	7
Brad Moser	0	0	1	0	3	0	0	2	0	X	6

Sheet 3	1	2	3	4	5	6	7	8	9	10	Final
Kelly Knapp 🔨	0	0	2	0	2	0	2	0	0	1	7
Charley Thomas	0	0	0	1	0	2	0	1	1	0	5

Sheet 4	1	2	3	4	5	6	7	8	9	10	Final
Team Laycock 🔨	0	1	0	0	3	0	2	1	0	1	8
Dylan Derksen	0	0	2	1	0	3	0	0	3	0	9

=== Draw 7 ===
Friday, January 24, 8:00 am

Sheet 1	1	2	3	4	5	6	7	8	9	10	Final
Brad Moser	0	0	1	0	0	1	0	X	X	X	2
Charley Thomas 🔨	0	4	0	1	2	0	1	X	X	X	8

Sheet 2	1	2	3	4	5	6	7	8	9	10	Final
Kelly Knapp 🔨	1	0	0	0	1	0	0	1	0	1	4
Team Laycock	0	1	0	0	0	2	0	0	2	0	5

Sheet 3	1	2	3	4	5	6	7	8	9	10	Final
Logan Ede	1	1	0	2	1	0	0	2	0	X	7
Dylan Derksen 🔨	0	0	0	0	0	2	1	0	1	X	4

Sheet 4	1	2	3	4	5	6	7	8	9	10	Final
Dustin Kalthoff 🔨	0	3	0	0	2	0	3	X	X	X	8
Jason Jacobson	0	0	0	1	0	1	0	X	X	X	2

=== Draw 8 ===
Friday, January 24, 4:00 pm

Sheet 1	1	2	3	4	5	6	7	8	9	10	Final
Dustin Kalthoff 🔨	1	0	0	1	0	3	0	1	0	1	7
Dylan Derksen	0	1	0	0	1	0	1	0	1	0	4

Sheet 2	1	2	3	4	5	6	7	8	9	10	Final
Charley Thomas	1	0	1	0	0	4	1	0	0	X	7
Logan Ede 🔨	0	1	0	1	0	0	0	2	1	X	5

Sheet 3	1	2	3	4	5	6	7	8	9	10	Final
Brad Moser	0	1	0	2	0	1	0	0	X	X	4
Jason Jacobson 🔨	2	0	3	0	3	0	1	4	X	X	13

Sheet 4	1	2	3	4	5	6	7	8	9	10	Final
Rylan Kleiter	1	2	0	0	0	1	0	2	2	X	8
Kelly Knapp 🔨	0	0	3	0	1	0	1	0	0	X	5

=== Draw 9 ===
Saturday, January 25, 2:00 pm

Sheet 1	1	2	3	4	5	6	7	8	9	10	Final
Kelly Knapp	1	0	3	0	1	0	2	3	0	1	11
Jason Jacobson 🔨	0	1	0	2	0	2	0	0	2	0	7

Sheet 2	1	2	3	4	5	6	7	8	9	10	Final
Rylan Kleiter	1	0	0	0	0	1	0	X	X	X	2
Dylan Derksen 🔨	0	1	2	1	3	0	0	X	X	X	7

Sheet 3	1	2	3	4	5	6	7	8	9	10	Final
Dustin Kalthoff 🔨	0	3	0	2	0	1	X	X	X	X	6
Charley Thomas	0	0	1	0	1	0	X	X	X	X	2

Sheet 4	1	2	3	4	5	6	7	8	9	10	Final
Brad Moser 🔨	1	0	2	0	0	0	1	0	0	X	4
Team Laycock	0	1	0	1	1	1	0	1	3	X	8

== Playoffs ==
Page playoff system
1	Team Laycock	9
2	Dustin Kalthoff	8
3	Rylan Kleiter	8
4	Kelly Knapp	6

Semifinal
2	Dustin Kalthoff	5
3	Rylan Kleiter	7

Final
1	Team Laycock	4
3	Rylan Kleiter	8

=== 1 vs. 2 ===
Saturday, January 25, 8:00 pm

Sheet 3	1	2	3	4	5	6	7	8	9	10	Final
Team Laycock 🔨	0	1	0	0	3	3	0	0	2	0	9
Dustin Kalthoff	1	0	2	1	0	0	2	1	0	1	8

=== 3 vs. 4 ===
Saturday, January 25, 8:00 pm

Sheet 4	1	2	3	4	5	6	7	8	9	10	Final
Rylan Kleiter 🔨	0	0	1	0	3	1	0	0	0	3	8
Kelly Knapp	0	0	0	3	0	0	0	3	0	0	6

=== Semifinal ===
Sunday, January 26, 10:00 am

Sheet 2	1	2	3	4	5	6	7	8	9	10	Final
Dustin Kalthoff 🔨	0	2	0	1	0	1	0	1	0	X	5
Rylan Kleiter	0	0	1	0	2	0	2	0	2	X	7

=== Final ===
Sunday, January 26, 7:00 pm

Sheet 3	1	2	3	4	5	6	7	8	9	10	Final
Team Laycock 🔨	1	0	0	1	0	1	0	1	1	X	5
Rylan Kleiter	0	0	3	0	3	0	2	0	0	X	8

2025 SaskTel Tankard

Rylan Kleiter
1st Saskatchewan Provincial Championship title
