= 2012 Whites Drug Store Classic =

World Curling Tour event

- Host city: Swan River, Manitoba
- Arena: Swan River Curling Club
- Dates: November 9–12
- Winner: (Manitoba) Mike McEwen
- Curling club: Assiniboine Memorial CC, Winnipeg
- Skip: Mike McEwen
- Third: B.J. Neufeld
- Second: Matt Wozniak
- Lead: Denni Neufeld
- Finalist: (Saskatchewan) Randy Bryden

The 2012 Whites Drug Store Classic was held from November 9 to 12 at the Swan River Curling Club in Swan River, Manitoba as part of the 2012–13 World Curling Tour. The event was held in a triple-knockout format, and the purse for the event was CAD$50,000, of which the winner, Mike McEwen, received CAD$12,000. McEwen defeated Randy Bryden of Saskatchewan in the final with a score of 4–2.

== Teams ==
The teams are listed as follows:

Skip	Third	Second	Lead	Locale
Sam Antila	Jonathan Sawatzky	Ian Graham	Jeff Antila	Thompson, Manitoba
Randy Bryden	Troy Robinson	Brennen Jones	Trent Knapp	Regina, Saskatchewan
Jim Cotter	Jason Gunnlaugson	Tyrel Griffith	Rick Sawatsky	Kelowna/Vernon, British Columbia
Benoît Schwarz (fourth)	Peter de Cruz (skip)	Dominik Märki	Valentin Tanner	Geneva, Switzerland
Rob Fowler	Allan Lyburn	Richard Daneault	Derek Samagalski	Brandon, Manitoba
Sean Grassie	Corey Chambers	Kody Janzen	Stuart Shiells	Winnipeg, Manitoba
Jeff Hartung	Kody Hartung	Tyler Hartung	Claire DeCock	Langenburg, Saskatchewan
Josh Heidt	Brock Montgomery	Matt Lang	Dustin Kidby	Kerrobert, Saskatchewan
Claudio Pescia (fourth)	Jason Jacobson (skip)	Matt Froehlich	Chadd McKenzie	Saskatoon, Saskatchewan
Steve Laycock	Kirk Muyres	Colton Flasch	Dallan Muyres	Saskatoon, Saskatchewan
William Lyburn	James Kirkness	Alex Forrest	Tyler Forrest	Winnipeg, Manitoba
Scott Madams	Braden Zawada	Ian Fordyce	Nigel Milnes	Winnipeg, Manitoba
Scott Manners	Tyler Lang	Ryan Deis	Mike Armstrong	North Battleford, Saskatchewan
Kelly Marnoch	Evan Reynolds	Branden Jorgenson	Chris Cameron	Carberry, Manitoba
Kevin Martin	John Morris	Marc Kennedy	Ben Hebert	Edmonton, Alberta
Mike McEwen	B.J. Neufeld	Matt Wozniak	Denni Neufeld	Winnipeg, Manitoba|
Terry McNamee	Steve Irwin	Travis Taylor	Travis Saban	Brandon, Manitoba
Sven Michel	Claudio Pätz	Sandro Trolliet	Simon Gempeler	Adelboden, Switzerland
Daley Peters	Chris Galbraith	Kyle Einarson	Mike Neufeld	Winnipeg, Manitoba
Howie Scales	David Tonnellier	Neil Scales	Martin Mueller	Swan River, Manitoba
John Shuster	Jeff Isaacson	Jared Zezel	John Landsteiner	Duluth, Minnesota
Jeff Stoughton	Jon Mead	Reid Carruthers	Mark Nichols	Winnipeg, Manitoba
Rob Van Kommer	Bart Witherspoon	Joey Witherspoon	Cale Dunbar	Carberry, Manitoba
Neal Watkins	Grant Spicer	Dave McGarry	Kent Meyn	Swan River, Manitoba

== Knockout results ==
The draw is listed as follows:

=== A event ===
First Knockout
(Manitoba) Terry McNamee	1
(Manitoba) Daley Peters	7
(Saskatchewan) Steve Laycock	6
(Manitoba) Howie Scales	1
(Saskatchewan) Randy Bryden	6
(Manitoba) Kelly Marnoch	3
(Saskatchewan) Scott Manners	7
(Manitoba) Scott Madams	2

Quarterfinals
(Alberta) Kevin Martin	6
(Manitoba) Daley Peters	0
(Switzerland) Peter de Cruz	0
(Saskatchewan) Steve Laycock	5
(Manitoba) Rob Fowler	4
(Saskatchewan) Randy Bryden	5
(Switzerland) Sven Michel	5
(Saskatchewan) Scott Manners	8

Semifinals
(Alberta) Kevin Martin	7
(Saskatchewan) Steve Laycock	2
(Saskatchewan) Randy Bryden	8
(Saskatchewan) Scott Manners	5

Qualifier 1
(Alberta) Kevin Martin	5
(Saskatchewan) Randy Bryden	4

First Knockout
(Manitoba) Sean Grassie	1
(Saskatchewan) Jeff Hartung	6
(Saskatchewan) Jason Jacobson	6
(Manitoba) Sam Antila	1
(Minnesota) John Shuster	5
(Manitoba) Neal Watkins	6
(Saskatchewan) Josh Heidt	7
(Manitoba) Rob Van Kommer	4

Quarterfinals
(Manitoba) Jeff Stoughton	6
(Saskatchewan) Jeff Hartung	5
(British Columbia) Jim Cotter	5
(Saskatchewan) Jason Jacobson	4
(Manitoba) William Lyburn	6
(Manitoba) Neal Watkins	2
(Manitoba) Mike McEwen	6
(Saskatchewan) Josh Heidt	3

Semifinals
(Manitoba) Jeff Stoughton	4
(British Columbia) Jim Cotter	3
(Manitoba) William Lyburn	3
(Manitoba) Mike McEwen	7

Qualifier 2
(Manitoba) Jeff Stoughton	2
(Manitoba) Mike McEwen	7

=== B event ===
Second Knockout
(Manitoba) Rob Fowler	5
(Manitoba) Terry McNamee	6
(Switzerland) Sven Michel	8
(Manitoba) Howie Scales	0
(Manitoba) Daley Peters	5
(Manitoba) Kelly Marnoch	7
(Switzerland) Peter de Cruz	2
(Manitoba) Scott Madams	6

Quarterfinals
(Manitoba) Terry McNamee	8
(British Columbia) Jim Cotter	7
(Switzerland) Sven Michel	4
(Manitoba) William Lyburn	2
(Manitoba) Kelly Marnoch	1
(Manitoba) Scott Madams	4

Semifinals
(Manitoba) Terry McNamee	7
(Switzerland) Sven Michel	6
(Manitoba) Scott Madams	0
(Saskatchewan) Randy Bryden	5

Qualifier 3
(Manitoba) Terry McNamee	5
(Saskatchewan) Randy Bryden	4

Second Knockout
(Manitoba) Neal Watkins	5
(Manitoba) Sean Grassie	7
(Saskatchewan) Josh Heidt	6
(Manitoba) Sam Antila	4
(Saskatchewan) Jeff Hartung	6
(Minnesota) John Shuster	3
(Saskatchewan) Jason Jacobson	5
(Manitoba) Rob Van Kommer	3

Quarterfinals
(Manitoba) Sean Grassie	7
(Saskatchewan) Steve Laycock	6
(Saskatchewan) Josh Heidt	4
(Saskatchewan) Scott Manners	5
(Saskatchewan) Jeff Hartung	7
(Saskatchewan) Jason Jacobson	3

Semifinals
(Manitoba) Sean Grassie	8
(Saskatchewan) Scott Manners	4
(Saskatchewan) Jeff Hartung	7
(Manitoba) Jeff Stoughton	3

Qualifier 4
(Manitoba) Sean Grassie	2
(Saskatchewan) Jeff Hartung	6

=== C event ===
Third Knockout		Semifinals		Qualifier 5
(Saskatchewan) Steve Laycock	7
(Manitoba) Sam Antila	5	(Saskatchewan) Steve Laycock	7
(Saskatchewan) Jason Jacobson	7	(Saskatchewan) Jason Jacobson	3
(Manitoba) Neal Watkins	4			(Saskatchewan) Steve Laycock	1
				(Saskatchewan) Randy Bryden	4

Third Knockout
(Minnesota) John Shuster	7
(Manitoba) Rob Van Kommer	1

Semifinals
(Minnesota) John Shuster	1
(Manitoba) Scott Madams	7
(Saskatchewan) Josh Heidt	8
(Switzerland) Sven Michel	2

Qualifier 6
(Manitoba) Scott Madams	1
(Saskatchewan) Josh Heidt	6

Third Knockout
(Manitoba) William Lyburn	1
(Manitoba) Rob Fowler	6
(Manitoba) Daley Peters	5
(Switzerland) Peter de Cruz	3

Semifinals
(Manitoba) Rob Fowler	4
(Manitoba) Jeff Stoughton	10
(Manitoba) Daley Peters	6
(Saskatchewan) Scott Manners	5

Qualifier 7
(Manitoba) Jeff Stoughton	7
(Manitoba) Daley Peters	5

Third Knockout		Semifinals		Qualifier 8
(Manitoba) Kelly Marnoch	6
(Manitoba) Howie Scales	2	(Manitoba) Kelly Marnoch	5
		(British Columbia) Jim Cotter	7
				(British Columbia) Jim Cotter	5
				(Manitoba) Sean Grassie	3

== Playoffs ==
The playoffs draw is listed as follows:

Quarterfinals
(Alberta) Kevin Martin	6
(Saskatchewan) Randy Bryden	7
(Manitoba) Terry McNamee	9
(Saskatchewan) Josh Heidt	5
(Manitoba) Mike McEwen	8
(Manitoba) Jeff Stoughton	0
(Saskatchewan) Jeff Hartung	5
(British Columbia) Jim Cotter	6

Semifinals
(Saskatchewan) Randy Bryden	5
(Manitoba) Terry McNamee	4
(Manitoba) Mike McEwen	4
(British Columbia) Jim Cotter	2

Final
(Saskatchewan) Randy Bryden	2
(Manitoba) Mike McEwen	4
