= Whites Drug Store Classic =

Former World Curling Tour event

The Whites Drug Store Classic (known as the Westwood Inn Classic in 2015) was an annual bonspiel, or curling tournament, that took place at the Swan River Curling Club in Swan River, Manitoba. The tournament was held in a triple-knockout format. The tournament, started in 1998, was part of the World Curling Tour and has been held every year since its inception until 2015.

== Past champions ==
Only skip's name is displayed.

Year	Winning team	Runner up team	Purse (CAD)
1998	(Manitoba) Dave Boehmer		
1999	(Manitoba) Kelly Skinner	(Manitoba) Howie Restall	$44,000
2000	(Manitoba) Allan Lynburn		
2001	(Manitoba) Dave Boehmer		
2002	(Manitoba) Allan Lynburn		
2003	(Saskatchewan) Doran Johnson		
2004	(Saskatchewan) Brad Heidt		
2005	(Saskatchewan) Gerald Shymko		
2006	(Saskatchewan) Bruce Korte		
2007	(Saskatchewan) Joel Jordison	(Saskatchewan) Darrell McKee	
2008	(Manitoba) Allan Lynburn	(Manitoba) Kelly Skinner	
2009	(Alberta) Kevin Martin	(Manitoba) Dave Boehmer	
2010	(Alberta) Kevin Martin	(Saskatchewan) Darrell McKee	$44,000
2011	(Manitoba) Reid Carruthers	(Saskatchewan) Colton Flasch	$44,000
2012	(Manitoba) Mike McEwen	(Saskatchewan) Randy Bryden	$44,000
2013	(Switzerland) Pascal Hess	(Saskatchewan) Jason Jacobson	$50,000
2014	(Manitoba) Jeff Stoughton	(Scotland) David Murdoch	$36,000
2015	(Saskatchewan) Jeff Hartung	(Manitoba) Alex Forrest	$23,000
