= College Clean Restoration Curling Classic =

World Curling Tour event

Location in Canada

The College Clean Restoration Curling Classic is an annual bonspiel on the World Curling Tour. It is held annually in December at the Nutana Curling Club in Saskatoon, Saskatchewan.

The event has been held annually since 1976. Bernie Sparkes won the first ever event.

== Event names ==
- 1976–1977: Labatt Curling Classic
- 1978–1984: Bessborough Curling Classic
- 1985–1986: Bessborough-Pacific Western Classic
- 1987–1989: Canadian Airlines-Bessborough Curling Classic
- 1990: Canadian Airlines Delta Bessborough Classic
- 1991: Canadian Airlines/Bessborough Curling Classic
- 1992: Delta Bessborough Cantel Curling Classic
- 1993–1996: Delta Bessborough SaskTel Classic
- 1997: Parktown Mens Curling Classic
- 1998: Molson Saskatoon Classic
- 1999–2004: Pointoptical Curling Classic
- 2005–2007: Point Optical Charity Classic
- 2008–2015: PointOptical Curling Classic
- 2016–present: College Clean Restoration Curling Classic

== Past champions ==
Only skips listed

Year	Winning skip	Runner-up skip	Purse (CAD)
1976	(British Columbia) Bernie Sparkes	(Alberta) Paul Gowsell	
1977	(Alberta) Paul Gowsell	(Alberta) Bob Hawkins	
1978	(Alberta) Paul Gowsell	(Saskatchewan) Rick Folk	$35,000
1979	(Alberta) Paul Gowsell	(Saskatchewan) Dennis Cochrane	$35,000
1980	(Alberta) Ed Lukowich	(Saskatchewan) Greg Balderston	
1981	(British Columbia) Bert Gretzinger	(Alberta) Paul Gowsell	
1982	(Saskatchewan) Rick Folk	(Saskatchewan) Ron Brucker	
1983	(Saskatchewan) Kirk Ziola	(Saskatchewan) Randy Woytowich	$45,000
1984	(Alberta) Ed Lukowich	(Ontario) Ed Werenich	$45,000
1985	(Alberta) Ed Lukowich	(Saskatchewan) Eugene Hritzuk	$50,000
1986	(Saskatchewan) Earl Garratt	(Alberta) Harold Breckenridge	
1987	(Manitoba) Kerry Burtnyk	(Saskatchewan) Earl Garratt	$50,000
1988	(Alberta) Roy Talbot	(Alberta) Wes Aman	
1989	(Saskatchewan) Eugene Hritzuk	(Saskatchewan) Jim Packet	$50,000
1990	(Saskatchewan) Allen Lind	(Saskatchewan) Earl Garratt	
1991	(Saskatchewan) Bryan Derbowka	(Manitoba) John Bubbs	
1992	(Ontario) Al Hackner	(Saskatchewan) Jim Packet	
1993	(Alberta) Mickey Pendergast	(Saskatchewan) Gary Scheirich	
1994	(Saskatchewan) Murray McEachern	(Ontario) Russ Howard	$50,000
1995	(Saskatchewan) Brad Heidt	(Saskatchewan) Greg Anholt	
1996	(Ontario) Wayne Middaugh	(Alberta) Brad Hannah	
1997	(Saskatchewan) Doug Harcourt	(Saskatchewan) Art Paulsen	$60,000
1998	(Saskatchewan) Doug Harcourt	(Manitoba) Jeff Stoughton	
1999	(Saskatchewan) Glen Despins	(Manitoba) Mark Olson	
2000	(Alberta) Kevin Park	(British Columbia) Greg McAulay	
2001	(Saskatchewan) Bruce Korte	(Alberta) Warren Hassall	$49,000
2002	(Alberta) Kevin Koe	(Saskatchewan) Glen Despins	$55,000
2003	(Saskatchewan) Scott Coghlan	(Alberta) Jamie King	
2004	(Alberta) Randy Ferbey	(Saskatchewan) Pat Simmons	$50,000
2005	(Saskatchewan) Glen Despins	(British Columbia) Bob Ursel	$50,000
2006	(Saskatchewan) Brian Humble	(Quebec) Robert Desjardins	$60,000
2007	(Saskatchewan) Randy Woytowich	(Saskatchewan) Darrell McKee	$60,000
2008	(Saskatchewan) Eugene Hritzuk	(Saskatchewan) Joel Jordison	$60,000
2009	(Saskatchewan) Brad Heidt	(Saskatchewan) Pat Simmons	$60,000
2010	(Manitoba) Dave Elias	(Saskatchewan) Randy Bryden	$60,000
2011	(Manitoba) Mike McEwen	(Alberta) Kevin Martin	$60,000
2012	(Ontario) John Epping	(Alberta) Kevin Koe	$50,000
2013	(Manitoba) Jeff Stoughton	(Alberta) Kevin Martin (Note: Jeff Sharp spared for Martin's team in the final because Martin had injured his back.)	$50,000
2014	(Manitoba) Mike McEwen	(Ontario) John Epping	$41,000
2015	(Manitoba) Mike McEwen	(Manitoba) Reid Carruthers	$41,000
2016	(Ontario) Brad Jacobs	(Norway) Thomas Ulsrud	$50,000
2017	(Saskatchewan) Colton Flasch	(South Korea) Kim Chang-min	$33,000
2018	Cancelled		
2019	(Alberta) Jeremy Harty	(Saskatchewan) Bruce Korte	$24,200
2020	Cancelled		
