= 2024 SaskTel Tankard =

Saskatchewan men's curling championship

- Host city: Saskatoon, Saskatchewan
- Arena: Nutana Curling Club
- Dates: January 31 – February 4
- Winner: Team McEwen
- Curling club: Nutana CC, Saskatoon
- Skip: Mike McEwen
- Third: Colton Flasch
- Second: Kevin Marsh
- Lead: Dan Marsh
- Coach: Brent Laing
- Finalist: Rylan Kleiter

The 2024 SaskTel Tankard, the provincial men's curling championship for Saskatchewan, was held from January 31 to February 4 at the Nutana Curling Club in Saskatoon, Saskatchewan. The winning Mike McEwen rink represented Saskatchewan at the 2024 Montana's Brier on home soil in Regina, Saskatchewan.

== Qualification process ==
Qualification method	Berths	Qualifying team(s)
CTRS Leaders	4	Dustin Kalthoff; Rylan Kleiter; Kelly Knapp; Mike McEwen
SCT Leaders	4	Josh Bryden; Kody Hartung; Jason Jacobson; Steve Laycock
Last Chance Qualifier	4	Daymond Bernath; Michael Carss; Josh Heidt; Garret Springer

== Teams ==
The teams are listed as follows:

Skip	Third	Second	Lead	Alternate	Coach	Club
Daymond Bernath	Bryden Tessier	Bradley Mosher	Cole Macknak		Travis Brown	Nutana CC, Saskatoon
Josh Bryden	Brecklin Gervais	Carter Williamson	Adam Bukurak		Randy Bryden	Caledonian CC, Regina
Michael Carss	Cody Sutherland	James Hom	Lyndon Holm			Nutana CC, Saskatoon
Kody Hartung	Tyler Hartung	Jayden Shwaga	Brady Kendel			Nutana CC, Saskatoon
Josh Heidt	Drew Heidt	Matt Lang	Tyler Gamble	Mark Lang		Kerrobert CC, Kerrobert
Jason Jacobson	Jason Ackerman	Jacob Hersikorn	Quinn Hersikorn			Nutana CC, Saskatoon
Dustin Kalthoff	Sam Wills	Aaron Shutra	Mat Ring			Nutana CC, Saskatoon
Rylan Kleiter	Joshua Mattern	Matthew Hall	Trevor Johnson		Dean Kleiter	Nutana CC, Saskatoon
Kelly Knapp	Brennen Jones	Mike Armstrong	Trent Knapp	Dustin Kidby	Brian McCusker	Highland CC, Regina
Steve Laycock	Shaun Meachem	Chris Haichert	Brayden Grindheim			Nutana CC, Saskatoon
Mike McEwen	Colton Flasch	Kevin Marsh	Dan Marsh		Brent Laing	Nutana CC, Saskatoon
Garret Springer	Drew Springer	Dustin Mikush	Austin Williamson			Highland CC, Regina

== Round robin standings ==
Final Round Robin Standings

Key
Teams to Playoffs
Teams to Tiebreaker

Pool A
Skip	W	L	PF	PA	EW	EL	BE	SE
Mike McEwen	5	0	43	16	25	14	4	11
Steve Laycock	3	2	38	34	22	21	1	6
Dustin Kalthoff	3	2	35	29	19	18	1	5
Josh Bryden	2	3	30	32	20	19	3	8
Michael Carss	1	4	31	48	19	25	3	6
Daymond Bernath	1	4	25	43	17	25	2	3

Pool B
Skip	W	L	PF	PA	EW	EL	BE	SE
Kody Hartung	5	0	39	17	20	14	4	7
Rylan Kleiter	4	1	34	18	19	15	3	7
Kelly Knapp	3	2	37	29	21	18	7	4
Josh Heidt	2	3	23	28	18	20	5	6
Jason Jacobson	1	4	22	41	16	20	0	5
Garret Springer	0	5	17	39	15	22	6	5

== Round-robin results ==
All draw times listed in Central Time (UTC−06:00).

=== Draw 1 ===
Wednesday, January 31, 2:00 pm

Sheet A	1	2	3	4	5	6	7	8	9	10	11	Final
Steve Laycock 🔨	0	1	0	0	3	0	0	0	2	0	4	10
Josh Bryden	0	0	0	1	0	0	3	1	0	1	0	6

Sheet B	1	2	3	4	5	6	7	8	9	10	Final
Dustin Kalthoff 🔨	2	0	1	0	0	2	0	3	X	X	8
Daymond Bernath	0	0	0	1	0	0	1	0	X	X	2

Sheet C	1	2	3	4	5	6	7	8	9	10	Final
Mike McEwen 🔨	2	2	0	4	0	0	2	3	X	X	13
Michael Carss	0	0	1	0	1	1	0	0	X	X	3

=== Draw 2 ===
Wednesday, January 31, 7:00 pm

Sheet A	1	2	3	4	5	6	7	8	9	10	Final
Rylan Kleiter 🔨	0	2	1	3	0	0	0	3	X	X	9
Garret Springer	0	0	0	0	1	1	1	0	X	X	3

Sheet B	1	2	3	4	5	6	7	8	9	10	11	Final
Kelly Knapp 🔨	3	0	0	0	2	0	0	1	1	0	1	8
Josh Heidt	0	0	1	3	0	1	1	0	0	1	0	7

Sheet C	1	2	3	4	5	6	7	8	9	10	Final
Jason Jacobson	0	1	0	0	1	0	0	X	X	X	2
Kody Hartung 🔨	2	0	1	1	0	4	3	X	X	X	11

=== Draw 3 ===
Thursday, February 1, 9:00 am

Sheet A	1	2	3	4	5	6	7	8	9	10	Final
Dustin Kalthoff 🔨	4	0	2	0	0	2	0	0	2	1	11
Michael Carss	0	4	0	1	1	0	0	2	0	0	8

Sheet B	1	2	3	4	5	6	7	8	9	10	Final
Kody Hartung 🔨	2	0	0	2	0	0	4	1	X	X	9
Garret Springer	0	1	1	0	0	1	0	0	X	X	3

Sheet C	1	2	3	4	5	6	7	8	9	10	Final
Rylan Kleiter	0	0	0	3	0	0	1	0	2	1	7
Kelly Knapp 🔨	0	1	1	0	0	3	0	1	0	0	6

Sheet D	1	2	3	4	5	6	7	8	9	10	Final
Josh Bryden	0	2	0	3	2	1	2	X	X	X	10
Daymond Bernath 🔨	1	0	1	0	0	0	0	X	X	X	2

=== Draw 4 ===
Thursday, February 1, 2:00 pm

Sheet A	1	2	3	4	5	6	7	8	9	10	Final
Mike McEwen	0	1	1	1	0	2	1	0	2	X	8
Daymond Bernath 🔨	1	0	0	0	2	0	0	1	0	X	4

Sheet B	1	2	3	4	5	6	7	8	9	10	Final
Steve Laycock 🔨	2	1	0	0	0	2	1	1	0	1	8
Michael Carss	0	0	0	2	1	0	0	0	2	0	5

Sheet C	1	2	3	4	5	6	7	8	9	10	Final
Jason Jacobson	0	1	1	0	1	1	0	2	0	0	6
Josh Heidt 🔨	2	0	0	2	0	0	2	0	0	1	7

Sheet D	1	2	3	4	5	6	7	8	9	10	Final
Rylan Kleiter 🔨	0	1	0	1	0	0	2	0	0	0	4
Kody Hartung	1	0	2	0	0	1	0	0	0	1	5

=== Draw 5 ===
Thursday, February 1, 7:00 pm

Sheet A	1	2	3	4	5	6	7	8	9	10	Final
Kelly Knapp 🔨	3	0	2	2	0	3	X	X	X	X	10
Jason Jacobson	0	1	0	0	2	0	X	X	X	X	3

Sheet B	1	2	3	4	5	6	7	8	9	10	Final
Mike McEwen 🔨	0	1	0	2	0	0	1	1	0	1	6
Josh Bryden	0	0	1	0	1	1	0	0	1	0	4

Sheet C	1	2	3	4	5	6	7	8	9	10	Final
Dustin Kalthoff 🔨	1	0	0	0	0	3	0	1	0	X	5
Steve Laycock	0	1	1	3	2	0	1	0	2	X	10

Sheet D	1	2	3	4	5	6	7	8	9	10	Final
Josh Heidt 🔨	0	1	0	0	1	0	0	1	0	1	4
Garret Springer	0	0	0	0	0	0	1	0	0	0	1

=== Draw 6 ===
Friday, February 2, 9:00 am

Sheet A	1	2	3	4	5	6	7	8	9	10	Final
Daymond Bernath 🔨	0	3	1	0	0	1	0	0	3	0	8
Michael Carss	2	0	0	1	1	0	1	3	0	2	10

Sheet B	1	2	3	4	5	6	7	8	9	10	Final
Rylan Kleiter 🔨	0	0	0	1	4	0	2	X	X	X	7
Jason Jacobson	1	0	0	0	0	1	0	X	X	X	2

Sheet C	1	2	3	4	5	6	7	8	9	10	Final
Kelly Knapp 🔨	0	1	1	0	3	0	1	0	2	X	8
Garret Springer	1	0	0	1	0	1	0	1	0	X	4

Sheet D	1	2	3	4	5	6	7	8	9	10	Final
Dustin Kalthoff	0	2	1	0	1	0	4	1	X	X	9
Josh Bryden 🔨	1	0	0	1	0	0	0	0	X	X	2

=== Draw 7 ===
Friday, February 2, 2:00 pm

Sheet A	1	2	3	4	5	6	7	8	9	10	Final
Mike McEwen	1	0	0	2	0	0	3	1	X	X	7
Dustin Kalthoff 🔨	0	1	0	0	1	0	0	0	X	X	2

Sheet B	1	2	3	4	5	6	7	8	9	10	11	Final
Steve Laycock 🔨	0	0	2	0	0	1	0	3	0	1	0	7
Daymond Bernath	2	1	0	0	1	0	1	0	2	0	2	9

Sheet C	1	2	3	4	5	6	7	8	9	10	Final
Josh Bryden	0	0	1	1	2	3	0	1	0	X	8
Michael Carss 🔨	0	2	0	0	0	0	1	0	2	X	5

Sheet D	1	2	3	4	5	6	7	8	9	10	Final
Kody Hartung	2	0	0	0	0	0	2	1	1	X	6
Josh Heidt 🔨	0	0	1	0	1	1	0	0	0	X	3

=== Draw 8 ===
Friday, February 2, 7:00 pm

Sheet A	1	2	3	4	5	6	7	8	9	10	Final
Jason Jacobson	0	1	1	0	3	0	0	2	0	2	9
Garret Springer 🔨	2	0	0	2	0	1	1	0	0	0	6

Sheet B	1	2	3	4	5	6	7	8	9	10	11	Final
Kelly Knapp 🔨	0	0	0	3	0	0	0	1	0	1	0	5
Kody Hartung	0	0	0	0	3	0	0	0	2	0	3	8

Sheet C	1	2	3	4	5	6	7	8	9	10	Final
Rylan Kleiter	0	0	2	2	1	1	0	1	X	X	7
Josh Heidt 🔨	0	1	0	0	0	0	1	0	X	X	2

Sheet D	1	2	3	4	5	6	7	8	9	10	Final
Mike McEwen	1	1	3	0	2	0	0	2	X	X	9
Steve Laycock 🔨	0	0	0	2	0	1	0	0	X	X	3

== Tiebreaker ==
Saturday, February 3, 9:00 am

Sheet C	1	2	3	4	5	6	7	8	9	10	Final
Steve Laycock 🔨	0	2	0	2	1	1	0	0	4	X	10
Dustin Kalthoff	1	0	2	0	0	0	1	0	0	X	4

== Playoffs ==
Page playoff system
A1	Mike McEwen	7
B1	Kody Hartung	2
A2	Steve Laycock	7
B2	Rylan Kleiter	9

Semifinal
B1	Kody Hartung	3
B2	Rylan Kleiter	7

Final
A1	Mike McEwen	7
B2	Rylan Kleiter	3

=== A1 vs. B1 ===
Saturday, February 3, 7:00 pm

Sheet B	1	2	3	4	5	6	7	8	9	10	Final
Mike McEwen 🔨	1	0	0	2	0	2	1	1	X	X	7
Kody Hartung	0	1	0	0	1	0	0	0	X	X	2

=== A2 vs. B2 ===
Saturday, February 3, 2:00 pm

Sheet B	1	2	3	4	5	6	7	8	9	10	11	Final
Steve Laycock	0	0	0	2	0	2	0	1	0	2	0	7
Rylan Kleiter 🔨	2	0	0	0	2	0	2	0	1	0	2	9

=== Semifinal ===
Sunday, February 4, 9:00 am

Sheet A	1	2	3	4	5	6	7	8	9	10	Final
Kody Hartung 🔨	0	1	0	1	0	0	1	0	0	X	3
Rylan Kleiter	0	0	2	0	2	1	0	1	1	X	7

=== Final ===
Sunday, February 4, 2:00 pm

Sheet B	1	2	3	4	5	6	7	8	9	10	Final
Mike McEwen 🔨	2	1	2	0	0	1	0	0	1	X	7
Rylan Kleiter	0	0	0	1	0	0	2	0	0	X	3

2024 SaskTel Tankard

Mike McEwen
1st Saskatchewan Provincial Championship title
