= 2014 Point Optical Curling Classic =

- Host city: Saskatoon, Saskatchewan
- Arena: Nutana Curling Club
- Dates: September 26–39
- Winner: (Manitoba) Mike McEwen
- Curling club: Fort Rouge CC, Winnipeg
- Skip: Mike McEwen
- Third: B. J. Neufeld
- Second: Matt Wozniak
- Lead: Denni Neufeld
- Finalist: (Ontario) John Epping

The 2014 Point Optical Curling Classic was held September 26-29 at the Nutana Curling Club in Saskatoon, Saskatchewan. It was the 39th edition of the event. The event was held on Week 5 of the 2014–15 World Curling Tour. The event had a purse of $41,000 The winning team won $11,000.

The Mike McEwen rink from Winnipeg won their second Point Optical Classic, defeating Toronto's John Epping rink in the final. It is the McEwen rink's second WCT win of the season, after having previously defeated Team Epping at the 2014 Stu Sells Oakville Tankard.

== Teams ==
Teams are as follows (only skip name shown)

- (Alberta) Matthew Blandford - eliminated, 4 wins
- (Alberta) Brendan Bottcher - eliminated, 3 wins
- (Manitoba) Reid Carruthers - eliminated, 1 win
- (United States) Brady Clark - eliminated, 1 win
- (Saskatchewan) Dale Craig - eliminated, 0 wins
- (Switzerland) Peter de Cruz - eliminated, 2 wins
- (Saskatchewan) Clint Dieno - C qualifier
- (Sweden) Niklas Edin - B qualifier
- (Ontario) John Epping - C qualifier
- (Newfoundland and Labrador) Brad Gushue - C qualifier
- (Saskatchewan) Jeff Hartung - eliminated, 2 wins
- (Ontario) Brad Jacobs - A qualifier
- (Alberta) Kevin Koe - C qualifier
- (Saskatchewan) Bruce Korte - eliminated, 3 wins
- (Saskatchewan) Chad Lang - eliminated, 0 wins
- (Saskatchewan) Steve Laycock - eliminated, 2 wins
- (Manitoba) William Lyburn - eliminated, 0 wins
- (Saskatchewan) Kevin Marsh - eliminated, 0 wins
- (Manitoba) Mike McEwen - A qualifier
- (Switzerland) Sven Michel - eliminated, 1 win
- (Japan) Yusuke Morozumi - B qualifier
- (United States) Chris Plys - eliminated, 2 wins
- (Alberta) Robert Schlender - eliminated, 2 wins
- (Alberta) Aaron Sluchinski - eliminated, 3 wins
- (Manitoba) Jeff Stoughton - eliminated, 3 wins
- (Alberta) Brock Virtue - eliminated, 2 wins

== Playoffs ==
Quarterfinals
(Ontario) Brad Jacobs	6
(Saskatchewan) Clint Dieno	1
(Sweden) Niklas Edin	4
(Ontario) John Epping	7
(Manitoba) Mike McEwen	5
(Alberta) Kevin Koe	3
(Japan) Yusuke Morozumi	3
(Newfoundland and Labrador) Brad Gushue	5

Semifinals
(Ontario) Brad Jacobs	2
(Ontario) John Epping	3
(Manitoba) Mike McEwen	6
(Newfoundland and Labrador) Brad Gushue	0

Final
(Ontario) John Epping	4
(Manitoba) Mike McEwen	5
