= 1999 Whites Drug Store Classic =

World Curling Tour event

- Host city: Swan Lake, Manitoba
- Arena: Swan Lake Curling Club
- Dates: November 11–17
- Winner: (Manitoba) Kelly Skinner
- Finalist: (Manitoba) Howie Restall

The 1999 Whites Drug Store Classic was held from November 11 to 17 at the Swan Lake Curling Club in Swan Lake, Manitoba. In the all-Manitoba final, Kelly Skinner defeated Howie Restall in five ends, 9–3.

== Teams ==
- Kevin Park
- Rob Van Kommer
- Peter Prokopowich
- Allan Lyburn
- Doug Harrison
- Terry Dennis
- Brent Braemer
- Brian White
- John Bubbs
- Brent Strachan
- Ron Tibble
- Robert Staples
- Kelly Skinner
- Gary Scheirich
- Vic Peters
- Sid Trofimenkoff
- Dale Duguid
- Marion Parasiuk
- Brian Fowler
- Jeff Hartung
- Brian Pallister
- Pat Spiring
- Doug Armour
- Orest Meleschuk
- Mark Hadway
- Barry Fry
- Don Spriggs
- Murray Woodward
- Brian Darling
- Howie Restall
- Kerry Burtnyk
- David Bohn

== Draw ==
=== A Event ===
A Event
Kevin Park | 6
Rob Van Kommer | 5
Peter Prokopowich | 8
Allan Lyburn | 3
Doug Harrison | 7
Terry Dennis | 11
Brent Braemer | 5
Brian White | 8
John Bubbs | 3
Brent Strachan | 8
Ron Tibble | 7
Robert Staples | 5
Kelly Skinner | 8
Gary Scheirich | 7
Vic Peters | 8
Sid Trofimenkoff | 1

Quarterfinals
Kevin Park | 1
Peter Prokopowich | 7
Terry Dennis | 3
Brian White | 8
Brent Strachan | 8
Ron Tibble | 2
Kelly Skinner | 6
Vic Peters | 0

Semifinals
Peter Prokopowich | 9
Brian White | 5
Brent Strachan | 1
Kelly Skinner | 4

Qualifier 1
Peter Prokopowich | 9
Kelly Skinner | 7

A Event
Dale Duguid | 8
Marion Parasiuk | 1
Brian Fowler | 6
Jeff Hartung | 4
Brian Pallister | 2
Pat Spiring | 9
Doug Armour | 2
Orest Meleschuk | 8
Mark Hadway | 2
Barry Fry | 10
Don Spriggs | 8
Murray Woodward | 5
Brian Darling | 8
Howie Restall | 7
Kerry Burtnyk | 7
David Bohn | 3

Quarterfinals
Dale Duguid | 3
Brian Fowler | 5
Pat Spiring | 8
Orest Meleschuk | 1
Barry Fry | 3
Don Spriggs | 8
Brian Darling | 0
Kerry Burtnyk | 10

Semifinals
Brian Fowler | 5
Pat Spiring | 10
Don Spriggs | 3
Kerry Burtnyk | 6

Qualifier 2
Pat Spiring | 5
Kerry Burtnyk | 6

=== B Event ===
Round of 16
Rob Van Kommer | 8
Allan Lyburn | 7
Doug Harrison | 7
Brent Braemer | 6

Quarterfinals
Rob Van Kommer | 4
Ron Tibble | 9
Doug Harrison | 2
Vic Peters | 7

Semifinals
Ron Tibble | 9
Brian Fowler | 7
Vic Peters | 6
Don Spriggs | 7

To Qualifier 3
Ron Tibble
Don Spriggs
Qualifier 3
Don Spriggs | 6
Pat Spiring | 7

Round of 16
Gary Scheirich | 10
Sid Trofimenkoff | 3
John Bubbs | 10
Robert Staples | 6

Quarterfinals
Gary Scheirich | 8
Terry Dennis | 9
Kevin Park | 5
John Bubbs | 4

Semifinals
Terry Dennis | 2
Kevin Park | 7

To Qualifier 3
Kevin Park | 3
Pat Spiring | 8

Round of 16
Doug Armour | 9
Brian Pallister | 6
Jeff Hartung | 7
Marion Parasiuk | 4

Quarterfinals
Doug Armour | 3
Brian Darling | 6
Jeff Hartung | 8
Barry Fry | 7

Semifinals
Brian Darling | 8
Brian White | 4
Jeff Hartung | 8
Brent Strachan | 7

To Qualifier 4
Brian Darling | 10
Jeff Hartung | 4
Qualifier 4
Brian Darling | 4
Kelly Skinner | 7

Round of 16
Howie Restall | 8
David Bohn | 2
Mark Hadway | 3
Murray Woodward | 8

Quarterfinals
Howie Restall | 8
Orest Meleschuk | 4
Dale Duguid | 4
Murray Woodward | 6

Semifinals
Howie Restall | 8
Murray Woodward | 2

To Qualifier 4
Howie Restall | L
Kelly Skinner | W

=== C Event ===
| Quarterfinals | | Semifinals | | Qualifier 5 |
| Allan Lyburn | 7 |
| Brent Braemer | 4 | Allan Lyburn | 6 |
| Barry Fry | 7 | Barry Fry | 5 |
| Doug Armour | 4 | | | Allan Lyburn | 7 |
| | | | | Don Spriggs | 6 |

| Quarterfinals | | Semifinals | | Qualifier 6 |
| | | | | Brian Darling | 3 |
| Rob Van Kommer | 9 | | | Rob Van Kommer | 7 |
| Doug Harrison | 3 | Rob Van Kommer | 6 |
| David Bohn | 6 | David Bohn | 5 |
| Mark Hadway | 3 |

Round of 16
Robert Staples | 9
Sid Trofimenkoff | 5

Quarterfinals
Brian White | 7
Robert Staples | 4
Dale Duguid | 6
Orest Meleschuk | 3

Semifinals
Ron Tibble | 1
Brian White | 7
Kevin Park | 3
Dale Duguid | 8

Qualifier 7
Brian White | 6
Dale Duguid | 7

Round of 16
Marion Parasiuk | 7
Brian Pallister | 4

Quarterfinals
Vic Peters | 6
Marion Parasiuk | 8
John Bubbs | 7
Gary Scheirich | 5

Semifinals
Marion Parasiuk | 5
Howie Restall | 9
John Bubbs | 5
Jeff Hartung | 7

Qualifier 8
Howie Restall | 8
Jeff Hartung | 2

=== Playoffs ===
Quarterfinals
Peter Prokopowich | L
Allan Lyburn | W
Kelly Skinner | W
Dale Duguid | L
Kerry Burtnyk | L
Howie Restall | W
Pat Spiring | W
Rob Van Kommer | L

Semifinals
Howie Restall | 8
Pat Spiring | 6
Allan Lyburn | 3
Kelly Skinner | 5

Final
Howie Restall | 3
Kelly Skinner | 5

==== Quarterfinals ====
| Team | Final |
| Peter Prokopowich | L |
| Allan Lyburn | W |

| Team | Final |
| Kelly Skinner | W |
| Dale Duguid | L |

| Team | Final |
| Kerry Burtnyk | L |
| Howie Restall | W |

| Team | Final |
| Pat Spiring | W |
| Rob Van Kommer | L |

==== Semifinals ====
| Team | 1 | 2 | 3 | 4 | 5 | 6 | 7 | 8 | 9 | 10 | Final |
|---|---|---|---|---|---|---|---|---|---|---|---|
| Howie Restall | 1 | 0 | 0 | 2 | 0 | 2 | 0 | 2 | 0 | 1 | 8 |
| Pat Spiring | 0 | 0 | 1 | 0 | 1 | 0 | 2 | 0 | 2 | 0 | 6 |

| Team | 1 | 2 | 3 | 4 | 5 | 6 | 7 | 8 | 9 | 10 | Final |
|---|---|---|---|---|---|---|---|---|---|---|---|
| Allan Lyburn | 0 | 1 | 1 | 0 | 0 | 0 | 1 | 0 | 0 | X | 3 |
| Kelly Skinner | 1 | 0 | 0 | 0 | 1 | 0 | 0 | 2 | 1 | X | 5 |

==== Final ====
Sunday, November 14, 6:00pm

| Team | 1 | 2 | 3 | 4 | 5 | 6 | 7 | 8 | 9 | 10 | Final |
|---|---|---|---|---|---|---|---|---|---|---|---|
| Kelly Skinner | 2 | 0 | 2 | 3 | 2 | X | X | X | X | X | 9 |
| Howie Restall | 0 | 3 | 0 | 0 | 0 | X | X | X | X | X | 3 |
