= Darrell McKee =

Canadian curler

- Curler
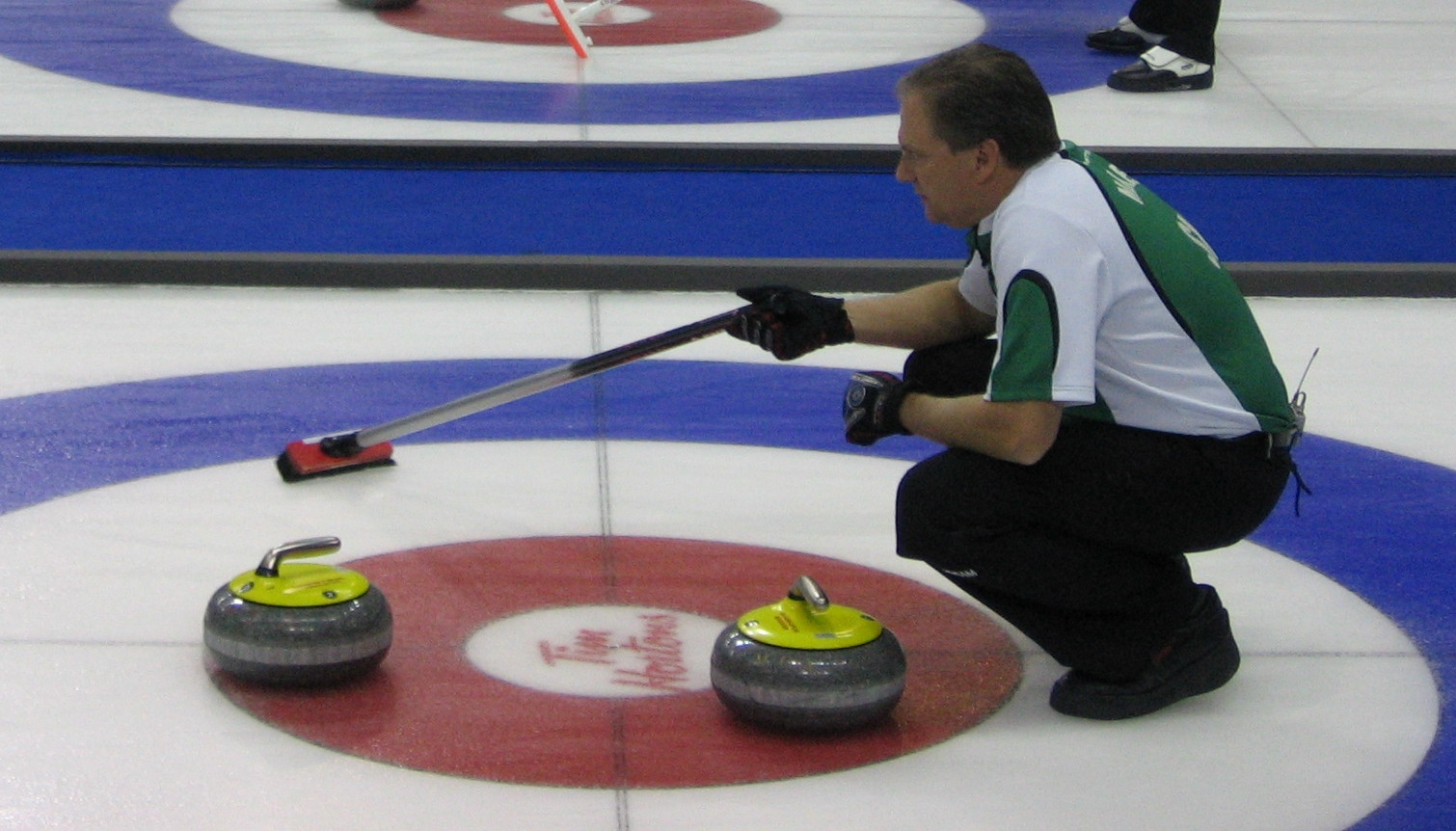

Team
- Curling club: Nutana CC, Saskatoon, SK
- Skip: Darrell McKee
- Third: Mark Lane
- Second: Kory Kohuch
- Lead: Rory Golanowski

Curling career
- Brier: 3 (2000, 2004, 2010)
- Top CTRS ranking: 15th (2005–06)
- Grand Slam victories: 1: Masters (2002)
Medal record
Men's curling
Representing Canada
World Senior Championships
| Bronze medal – third place | 2026 Geneva |

Darrell McKee (born c. 1963) is a Canadian curler from Saskatoon, Saskatchewan. He is a Canadian Senior Champion, two-time provincial champion in men's, one-time Saskatchewan mixed champion, and five-time Saskatchewan senior champion.

== Curling career ==
McKee and Bruce Korte have long been teammates, and together formed teams among the best in Saskatchewan. They have been teammates on and off since 1998. For most of that time, McKee played third for Korte, but beginning in 2009, McKee and Korte switched positions.

Korte and McKee played in their first Brier together in 2000, after winning the provincial championship, along with teammates Roger Korte and Rory Golanowski. The team finished the round robin off with a 5-6 record, short of the playoffs. Two years later, the team won their only Grand Slam of Curling victory as of 2010, winning the Masters of Curling over Jeff Stoughton.

From 2002 to 2005, McKee left the team, but was an alternate for them when they made the Brier in 2004.

McKee did not win his second provincial championship until ten years later, qualifying for the 2010 Tim Hortons Brier in Halifax. McKee's team consisted of both Korte's and a new lead in Rob Markowsky.

In 2009 McKee skipped a team consisting of Allie McMillan (Gerhardt), Jason Jacobson, and Amanda Jacobson to a bronze medal at the 2009 Canadian Mixed Curling Championship held in Iqaluit.

McKee has gad success in senior curling winning Saskatchewan provincial championships in 2014, 2017, 2018, 2019, and 2020 with various teams that included Brad Gee and Rick Pickard (2014), Rod Antonichuk (2017 & 2018), Tony Korol (2017), Dan Kennedy (2018), Mark Lane (2014, 2017, 2018) and Rory Golanowski, Kory Kohuch, and Bruce Korte (2019 & 2020).

Bruce Korte, Darrell McKee, Kory Kohuch, and Rory Goloanowski captured the 2019 Canadian Senior Curling Championships by defeating Bryan Cochrane of Ontario in the final.
