= Dustin Kalthoff =

Canadian curler (born 1982/83)

- Curler
- Born: 1982 or 1983 (age 43–44); Humboldt, Saskatchewan

Team
- Curling club: Nutana CC, Saskatoon, SK
- Skip: Brent Pierce
- Fourth: Dustin Kalthoff
- Second: Josh Heidt
- Lead: Logan Ede
- Alternate: Jason Jacobson

Curling career
- Member Association: Saskatchewan
- World Mixed Doubles Championship: 1 (2016)
- Top CTRS ranking: 15th (2024–25)
Medal record
Curling
Canadian Mixed Doubles Championship
Silver medal – second place	2013 Leduc
Bronze medal – third place	2016 Saskatoon

Dustin Kalthoff is a Canadian curler from Humboldt, Saskatchewan.

== Teams ==
=== Men's ===
Season	Skip	Third	Second	Lead
2007–08	Dustin Kalthoff	Gord Bell	Kyle Horbay	Garry Oleksin
2008–09	Dustin Kalthoff	Brent Kolodziejski	Greg Wittig	Garry Oleksin
2010–11	Randy Woytowich	Clint Dieno	Dustin Kalthoff	Lyndon Holm
2011–12	Dustin Kalthoff (fourth)	Randy Woytowich (skip)	Lionel Holm	Lyndon Holm
2011–12	Gery Adam	Warren Jackson	Dustin Kalthoff	Lyndon Holm
2012–13	Dustin Kalthoff (fourth)	Randy Woytowich (skip)	Lionel Holm	Lyndon Holm
2013–14	Gary Scheirich (fourth)	Dustin Kalthoff	Cory Spanier	Randy Woytowich (skip)
2014–15	Jason Jacobson	Dustin Kalthoff	Tony Korol	Rory Golanowski
2014–15	Shaun Meachem (fourth)	Drew Heidt (skip)	Dustin Kalthoff	Jayden Shwaga
2015–16	Jason Jacobson	Carl deConinck Smith	Dustin Kalthoff	Rory Golanowski
2016–17	Jason Jacobson	Dustin Kalthoff	Niclas Neufeld	Rory Golanowski
2017–18	Dustin Kalthoff	Shaun Meachem	Brayden Stewart	Jared Latos
2018–19	Dustin Kalthoff	Shaun Meachem	Brayden Stewart	Jared Latos
2019–20	Jason Jacobson	Dustin Kalthoff	Garret Springer	Drew Springer
2020–21	Jason Jacobson	Dustin Kalthoff	Jake Hersikorn	Quinn Hersikorn
2021–22	Jason Jacobson	Dustin Kalthoff	Jake Hersikorn	Quinn Hersikorn
2022	Kyler Kleibrink	Dustin Kalthoff	Chris Kennedy	Evan van Amsterdam
2023–24	Dustin Kalthoff	Braden Fleischhacker	Jayden Bindig	Nathan Pomedli
2024–25	Dustin Kalthoff	Josh Heidt	Sam Wills	Mat Ring
2025–26	Dustin Kalthoff (Fourth)	Brent Pierce (Skip)	Josh Heidt	Logan Ede

=== Mixed doubles ===
Season	Female	Male	Coach	Events
2012–13	Nancy Martin	Dustin Kalthoff		CMDCT 2013 (silver)
2013–14	Nancy Martin	Dustin Kalthoff		CMDCT 2014 (5th)
2014–15	Nancy Martin	Dustin Kalthoff		CMDCT 2015 (25th)
2015–16	Marliese Kasner	Dustin Kalthoff	Jeff Stoughton (WMDCC)	CMDCT 2016 (bronze); WMDCC 2016 (5th)
2016–17	Marliese Kasner	Dustin Kalthoff		CMDCT 2017 (5th)
2017–18	Marliese Kasner	Dustin Kalthoff		CMDCC 2018 (25th)
2018–19	Sherry Just	Dustin Kalthoff		CMDCC 2019 (17th)
2024–Present	Christie Gamble	Dustin Kalthoff		CMDCC 2024 (22nd)

== Personal life ==
Kalthoff graduated from University of Saskatchewan. He currently lives in Saskatoon.

He is founder and General Manager at Saskatoon Auto Connection in Saskatoon.

Kalthoff's father Kevin is a three-time Saskatchewan men's champion.
