= Jason Jacobson =

Canadian curler

- Curler
- Born: June 8, 1977 (age 49)

Team
- Curling club: Nutana CC, Saskatoon, SK
- Skip: Brent Pierce
- Fourth: Dustin Kalthoff
- Second: Josh Heidt
- Lead: Logan Ede
- Alternate: Jason Jacobson

Curling career
- Member Association: Saskatchewan
- Top CTRS ranking: 8th (2003–04)

Jason Jacobson (born June 8, 1977) is a Canadian curler from Saskatoon, Saskatchewan when he is not working as a member of the Saskatoon Police Service.

== Career ==
Jacobson won the 2009 Saskatchewan provincial mixed championship playing second on a team skipped by Darrell McKee. The team represented Saskatchewan at the 2009 Canadian Mixed Curling Championship, where they finished third. After finishing 9-2 in the round robin, they would lose in the semi-final to Ontario.

Jacobson is a long-time competitor on the World Curling Tour. He played in his first Grand Slam event playing third for the Jeff Sharp rink at the 2003 Players' Championship, where they would lose all of their matches. The next season Jacobson joined the Brad Heidt rink at third. The team played in two Grand Slams in the 2003-04 season. They failed to make the playoffs at the 2003 Canadian Open but did much better at the 2004 Players' Championship, placing in 4th place after losing in a rare 3rd place game. That season, he won two Tour events, the Russell Beef & Barley Classic and the SGI Canada Charity Classic. The next season, the team won the 2004 Whites Drug Store Classic. Jacobson left the team in 2005.

After playing third for the Steve Laycock rink for one season, Jacobson joined the Bruce Korte team in 2006, playing second for the team. The team would play in the 2007 Players' Championship, making it to the quarterfinals, where they lost to Randy Ferbey. The team also won the 2006 Whites Drug Store Classic that season. Jacobson left the Korte team after that one season. He then would join the Darrell McKee for two seasons, then the Clint Dieno, for one season, then formed his own team for the 2010-11 season, then joined the McKee rink again in 2011-12 before once again forming his own team in 2012. Jacobson did not win any tour events until winning the 2016 Medicine Hat Charity Classic. He was the 2012 champion skip in the Canadian Police Curling Championship, as well as one of the co-organizers of the 2013 event taking place in Saskatoon.

In the 2024-25 season, his team missed the playoffs at the 2025 SaskTel Tankard.

Jacobson represented Saskatchewan at the 2025 Canadian Police Association Curling Championships, finishing in a tie for fifth with a 5 and 4 won loss record.
