= Steve Laycock =

Canadian curler (born 1982)

- Curler
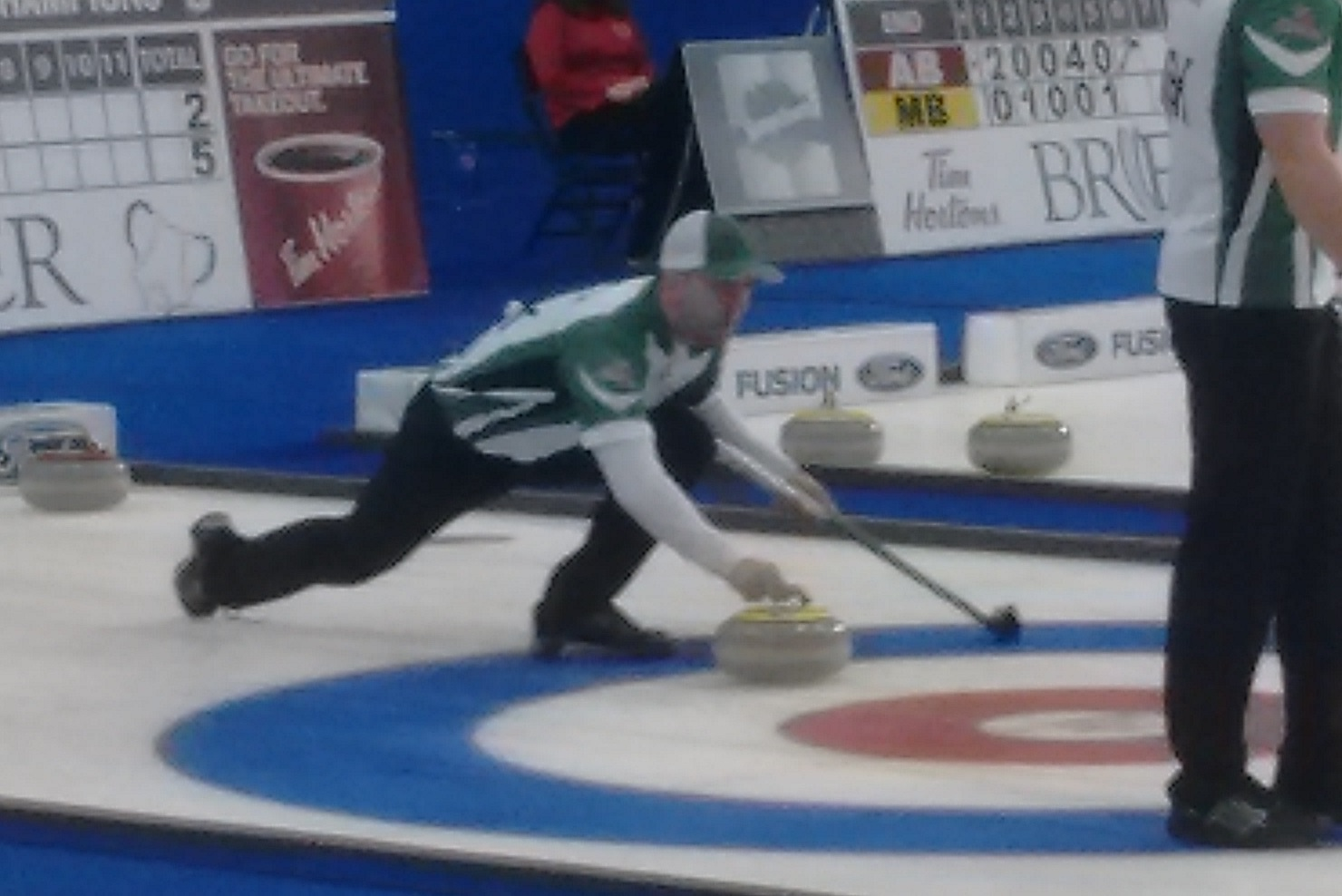
- Born: October 29, 1982 (age 44); Yorkton, Saskatchewan, Canada

Team
- Curling club: Nutana CC, Saskatoon, SK
- Skip: Steve Laycock
- Third: Shaun Meachem
- Second: Chris Haichert
- Lead: Brayden Grindheim
- Mixed doubles partner: Nancy Martin

Curling career
- Member Association: Saskatchewan (2002–2018; 2021–present); British Columbia (2018–2021)
- Brier: 10 (2007, 2008, 2011, 2014, 2015, 2016, 2018, 2019, 2020, 2021)
- Top CTRS ranking: 4th (2014–15)
Medal record
Men's curling
Representing Canada
World Junior Championships
Gold medal – first place	2003 Flims
Representing Saskatchewan
Tim Hortons Brier
Bronze medal – third place	2008 Winnipeg
Bronze medal – third place	2015 Calgary

Stephen Laycock (born October 29, 1982) is a Canadian curler from Saskatoon. He currently skips his own team out of Swift Current.

== Career ==
In 2003, Laycock skipped Team Saskatchewan to a Canadian Junior Curling Championship and a World Junior Curling Championship. Until 2007 he tried repeatedly to skip a team to the provincial men's championship in 2004, 2005 and 2006, but was unsuccessful in all of his attempts. In 2006 he joined up with Pat Simmons as his lead, and finally won a provincial championship with him in 2007. He would win again in 2008 and once more in 2011, this time throwing third stones and calling the game for Simmons. Simmons left the team at the end of the 2010–11 season, leaving Laycock to find a replacement third. Laycock announced the addition of Joel Jordison to his team for the 2011–2012 season. Jordison and second Brennen Jones left the team after that season.

Laycock represented Saskatchewan at the 2014 Tim Hortons Brier after winning the provincial championship in Shaunavon on February 2, 2014. He led the province to a 6–5 record, narrowly missing the playoffs.

Laycock also represented Saskatchewan at the 2015 Tim Hortons Brier. Laycock would finish round-robin with a 7–4 record (3rd place). In the 3v4 game, Laycock had a chance for three in the tenth end to win the game, but missed it only getting two points. He then lost in the extra end. In the bronze medal game against Gushue of NL, Laycock once again had a chance for the win by getting two, but missed it. In the eleventh end, Saskatchewan would steal two to pick up the bronze medal.

After representing Saskatchewan two more times at the Brier, his team broke up in 2018. He then joined the Jim Cotter rink based out of British Columbia. He played in three Briers as a member of the Cotter rink (2019, 2020, 2021), including skipping the rink in 2020, and the first two games of their 2021 campaign before returning to the third position. Laycock left the team after the season.

Laycock played out of Saskatchewan again beginning with the 2022–23 season. He skipped a team of Shaun Meachem, Chris Haichert and Brayden Stewart at the 2023 SaskTel Tankard, losing in the final to Kelly Knapp. The team played in the 2024 SaskTel Tankard with new lead Brayden Grindheim, replacing Stewart. There, the team lost out in the page playoff 3 vs. 4 game to Rylan Kleiter.

== Personal life ==
Laycock is employed as a compensation manager at the University of Saskatchewan. He is married and has one child.

== Grand Slam record ==
Key
C	Champion
F	Lost in Final
SF	Lost in Semifinal
QF	Lost in Quarterfinals
R16	Lost in the round of 16
Q	Did not advance to playoffs
T2	Played in Tier 2 event
DNP	Did not participate in event
N/A	Not a Grand Slam event that season

Event	2003–04	2004–05	2005–06	2006–07	2007–08	2008–09	2009–10	2010–11	2011–12	2012–13	2013–14	2014–15	2015–16	2016–17	2017–18	2018–19	2019–20
Elite 10	N/A	N/A	N/A	N/A	N/A	N/A	N/A	N/A	N/A	N/A	N/A	Q	SF	Q	DNP	DNP	N/A
Masters	DNP	DNP	Q	QF	QF	Q	DNP	Q	Q	SF	DNP	QF	SF	SF	Q	DNP	DNP
Tour Challenge	N/A	N/A	N/A	N/A	N/A	N/A	N/A	N/A	N/A	N/A	N/A	N/A	Q	QF	QF	DNP	DNP
The National	QF	DNP	F	Q	QF	Q	Q	Q	Q	Q	SF	QF	Q	Q	DNP	DNP	DNP
Canadian Open	Q	DNP	DNP	QF	Q	Q	Q	QF	Q	Q	Q	F	QF	QF	QF (Note: Laycock skipped Team Bottcher, replacing Brendan Bottcher as skip.)	DNP	DNP
Players'	SF	DNP	DNP	SF	SF	Q	QF	Q	DNP	Q	Q	Q	QF	Q	DNP	DNP	DNP
Champions Cup	N/A	N/A	N/A	N/A	N/A	N/A	N/A	N/A	N/A	N/A	N/A	N/A	QF	Q	DNP	DNP	DNP
