= 2011 Meyers Norris Penny Charity Classic =

- Host city: Medicine Hat, Alberta
- Arena: Medicine Hat Curling Club
- Dates: October 14–17
- Men's winner: (Alberta) Jamie King
- Curling club: Calgary CC/Saville SC, Calgary/Edmonton
- Skip: Jamie King
- Fourth: Warren Hassall
- Second: Todd Brick
- Lead: Sean Morris
- Finalist: (Alberta) Brock Virtue
- Women's winner: (Scotland) Eve Muirhead
- Skip: Eve Muirhead
- Third: Anna Sloan
- Second: Vicki Adams
- Lead: Claire Hamilton
- Finalist: (Alberta) Crystal Webster

The 2011 Meyers Norris Penny Charity Classic was held from October 14 to 17 at the Medicine Hat Curling Club in Medicine Hat, Alberta as part of the 2011–12 World Curling Tour. The purse for the men's event was CAD$37,000, while the purse for the women's event was CAD$30,000. The events were both held in a triple knockout format.

== Men ==
=== Teams ===
Skip	Third	Second	Lead	Locale
Chris Anderson	Wayne Keikkenen	Stan Hubl	Gordon Hart	Rocky Mountain House, Alberta
Tom Appelman	Adam Enright	Brandon Klassen	Nathan Connolly	Edmonton, Alberta
Brent Bawel	Mike Jantzen	Sean O'Connor	Hardi Sulimma	Calgary, Alberta
Scott Bitz	Mark Lang	Aryn Schmidt	Dean Hicke	Regina, Saskatchewan
Matthew Blandford	Tom Sallows	Mike Westlund	Chris Sanford	Cold Lake, Alberta
Brendan Bottcher	Bradley Thiessen	Micky Lizmore	Karrick Martin	Edmonton, Alberta
Randy Bryden	Troy Robinson	Trent Knapp	Kelly Knapp	Regina, Saskatchewan
Warren Cross	Dean Darwent	Kyle Richard	Colin Huber	Edmonton, Alberta
Vance Elder	Albert Gerdung	Darren Grierson	Jim Bush	Calgary, Alberta
Jason Gunnlaugson	Justin Richter	Jason Ackerman	David Kraichy	Beausejour, Manitoba
Krisztián Hall	György Nagy	Gábor Észöl	Lajos Belleli	Hungary
Brad Heidt	Mitch Heidt	Josh Heidt	Regis Neumeier	Kindersley, Saskatchewan
Glen Kennedy	Dustin Eckstrand	Steve Meadows	Kris Meadows	Edmonton, Alberta
Warren Hassall (fourth)	Jamie King (skip)	Todd Brick	Sean Morris	Edmonton/Calgary, Alberta
Steve Laycock	Joel Jordison	Brennen Jones	Dallan Muyres	Saskatoon, Saskatchewan
Matt Lemna	Duane Grierson	Wallace Hollingshead	Mike O'Grady	Calgary, Alberta
Rick McKague	Jim Moats	Doug McNish	Paul Strandlund	Edmonton, Alberta
Darrell McKee	Clint Dieno	Jason Jacobson	Brock Montgomery	Saskatoon, Saskatchewan
Leon Moch	Delvin Moch	Kevin Aberle	Donny Zahn	Medicine Hatt, Alberta
Yusuke Morozumi	Tsuyoshi Yamaguchi	Tetsuro Shimizu	Kosuke Morozumi	Karuizawa, Japan
Braeden Moskowy	Kirk Muyres	D.J. Kidby	Dustin Kidby	Regina, Saskatchewan
Darren Moulding	Scott Cruickshank	Shaun Planaden	Kyle Iverson	Red Deer, Alberta
Dan Petryk (fourth)	Steve Petryk (skip)	Colin Hodgson	Brad Chyz	Calgary, Alberta
Kevin Yablonski (fourth)	Jon Rennie (skip)	Harrison Boss	Matthew McDonald	Calgary, Alberta
Dean Ross	Don DeLair	Chris Blackwell	Steve Jensen	Calgary, Alberta
Robert Schlender	Chris Lemishka	Darcy Hafso	Don Bartlett	Edmonton, Alberta
Alexey Tselousov	Andrey Drozdov	Alexey Stukalsky	Aleksey Kamnev	Moscow, Russia
Markku Uusipaavalniemi	Toni Anttila	Kasper Hakunti	Joni Ikonen	Helsinki, Finland
Brock Virtue	J. D. Lind	Dominic Daemen	Matthew Ng	Calgary, Alberta
Wade White	Kevin Tym	Dan Holowaychuk	George White	Edmonton, Alberta
Jeremy Hodges (fourth)	Matt Willerton (skip)	Dalen Petersen	Nevin DeMilliano	Edmonton, Alberta
Dustin Kalthoff (fourth)	Randy Woytowich (skip)	Lionel Holm	Lyndon Holm	Saskatoon, Saskatchewan

=== Results ===
==== A Event ====
Round of 16
(Saskatchewan) Steve Laycock	8
(Hungary) Krisztián Hall	5
(Alberta) Jamie King	7
(Saskatchewan) Brad Heidt	3
(Alberta) Wade White	7
(Alberta) Matt Lemna	6
(Alberta) Brendan Bottcher	6
(Finland) Markku Uusipaavalniemi	7
(Alberta) Steve Petryk	8
(Alberta) Glen Kennedy	2
(Alberta) Tom Appelman	2
(Japan) Yusuke Morozumi	9
(Manitoba) Jason Gunnlaugson	6
(Alberta) Warren Cross	1
(Alberta) Matt Willerton	3
(Alberta) Brent Bawel	11

Quarterfinals
(Saskatchewan) Steve Laycock	7
(Alberta) Jamie King	2
(Alberta) Wade White	3
(Finland) Markku Uusipaavalniemi	9
(Alberta) Steve Petryk	3
(Japan) Yusuke Morozumi	8
(Manitoba) Jason Gunnlaugson	0
(Alberta) Brent Bawel	6

Semifinals
(Saskatchewan) Steve Laycock	4
(Finland) Markku Uusipaavalniemi	7
(Japan) Yusuke Morozumi	6
(Alberta) Brent Bawel	4

Qualifier 1
(Finland) Markku Uusipaavalniemi	7
(Japan) Yusuke Morozumi	6

Round of 16
(Alberta) Robert Schlender	12
(Alberta) Chris Anderson	3
(Alberta) Darren Moulding	1
(Russia) Alexey Tselousov	7
(Saskatchewan) Scott Bitz	8
(Alberta) Vance Elder	4
(Alberta) Rick McKague	0
(Saskatchewan) Braeden Moskowy	8
(Alberta) Brock Virtue	6
(Alberta) Matthew Blandford	3
(Saskatchewan) Randy Woytowich	4
(Alberta) Leon Moch	6
(Alberta) Dean Ross	1
(Saskatchewan) Darrell McKee	7
(Alberta) Jon Rennie	2
(Saskatchewan) Randy Bryden	7

Quarterfinals
(Alberta) Robert Schlender	3
(Russia) Alexey Tselousov	6
(Saskatchewan) Scott Bitz	6
(Saskatchewan) Braeden Moskowy	1
(Alberta) Brock Virtue	10
(Alberta) Leon Moch	4
(Saskatchewan) Darrell McKee	6
(Saskatchewan) Randy Bryden	5

Semifinals
(Russia) Alexey Tselousov	4
(Saskatchewan) Scott Bitz	5
(Alberta) Brock Virtue	6
(Saskatchewan) Darrell McKee	2

Qualifier 2
(Saskatchewan) Scott Bitz	7
(Alberta) Brock Virtue	6

==== B Event ====
Second Knockout
(Hungary) Krisztián Hall	4
(Saskatchewan) Brad Heidt	8
(Alberta) Brendan Bottcher	7
(Alberta) Matt Lemna	1

Quarterfinals
(Alberta) Steve Petryk	9
(Saskatchewan) Brad Heidt	7
(Manitoba) Jason Gunnlaugson	5
(Alberta) Brendan Bottcher	4

Semifinals
(Alberta) Steve Petryk	5
(Russia) Alexey Tselousov	1
(Manitoba) Jason Gunnlaugson	6
(Saskatchewan) Darrell McKee	5

To Qualifier 3
(Alberta) Steve Petryk	3
(Manitoba) Jason Gunnlaugson	2

Second Knockout
(Alberta) Glen Kennedy	5
(Alberta) Tom Appelman	6
(Alberta) Warren Cross	2
(Alberta) Matt Willerton	7

Quarterfinals
(Alberta) Jamie King	4
(Alberta) Tom Appelman	6
(Alberta) Wade White	7
(Alberta) Matt Willerton	4

Semifinals
(Alberta) Tom Appelman	4
(Alberta) Wade White	3

To Qualifier 3
(Alberta) Tom Appelman	5
(Japan) Yusuke Morozumi	2
Qualifier 3
(Alberta) Steve Petryk	6
(Alberta) Tom Appelman	2

Second Knockout
(Alberta) Chris Anderson	1
(Alberta) Darren Moulding	9
(Alberta) Vance Elder	6
(Alberta) Rick McKague	7

Quarterfinals
(Alberta) Leon Moch	6
(Alberta) Darren Moulding	7
(Saskatchewan) Randy Bryden	5
(Alberta) Rick McKague	6

Semifinals
(Alberta) Darren Moulding	6
(Saskatchewan) Steve Laycock	5
(Alberta) Rick McKague	8
(Alberta) Brent Bawel	10

To Qualifier 4
(Alberta) Darren Moulding	3
(Alberta) Brent Bawel	5

Second Knockout
(Alberta) Matthew Blandford	3
(Saskatchewan) Randy Woytowich	7
(Alberta) Dean Ross	8
(Alberta) Jon Rennie	3

Quarterfinals
(Alberta) Robert Schlender	8
(Saskatchewan) Randy Woytowich	3
(Saskatchewan) Braeden Moskowy	9
(Alberta) Dean Ross	3

Semifinals
(Alberta) Robert Schlender	8
(Saskatchewan) Braeden Moskowy	6

To Qualifier 4
(Alberta) Robert Schlender	5
(Alberta) Brock Virtue	6
Qualifier 4
(Alberta) Brent Bawel	4
(Alberta) Brock Virtue	6

==== C Event ====
Third Knockout
(Hungary) Krisztián Hall	5
(Alberta) Matt Lemna	11
(Alberta) Leon Moch	0
(Saskatchewan) Randy Bryden	7

Quarterfinals
(Saskatchewan) Steve Laycock	4
(Alberta) Matt Lemna	5
(Saskatchewan) Braeden Moskowy	3
(Saskatchewan) Randy Bryden

Semifinals
(Alberta) Matt Lemna	6
(Saskatchewan) Randy Bryden	4

Qualifier 5
(Alberta) Matt Lemna	4
(Alberta) Tom Appelman	5

Third Knockout
(Alberta) Glen Kennedy	5
(Alberta) Warren Cross	3

Quarterfinals
(Saskatchewan) Randy Woytowich	6
(Alberta) Dean Ross	5
(Alberta) Rick McKague	5
(Alberta) Glen Kennedy	4

Semifinals
(Saskatchewan) Randy Woytowich	6
(Japan) Yusuke Morozumi	5
(Alberta) Rick McKague	5
(Manitoba) Jason Gunnlaugson	4

Qualifier 6
(Saskatchewan) Randy Woytowich	3
(Alberta) Rick McKague	7

Third Knockout
(Alberta) Chris Anderson	6
(Alberta) Vance Elder	8

Quarterfinals
(Saskatchewan) Darrell McKee	7
(Alberta) Vance Elder	4
(Alberta) Jamie King	6
(Alberta) Matt Willerton	5

Semifinals
(Saskatchewan) Darrell McKee	7
(Alberta) Robert Schlender	3
(Alberta) Jamie King	7
(Alberta) Darren Moulding	6

Qualifier 7
(Saskatchewan) Darrell McKee	4
(Alberta) Jamie King	5

Third Knockout
(Saskatchewan) Brad Heidt	4
(Alberta) Brendan Bottcher	5
(Alberta) Matthew Blandford	9
(Alberta) Jon Rennie	2

Quarterfinals
(Alberta) Wade White	8
(Alberta) Brendan Bottcher	4
(Russia) Alexey Tselousov	8
(Alberta) Matthew Blandford	1

Semifinals
(Alberta) Wade White	5
(Russia) Alexey Tselousov	0

Qualifier 8
(Alberta) Wade White	3
(Alberta) Brent Bawel	8

=== Playoffs ===
Quarterfinals
(Finland) Markku Uusipaavalniemi	6
(Alberta) Brent Bawel	5
(Alberta) Brock Virtue	6
(Alberta) Rick McKague	1
(Saskatchewan) Scott Bitz	5
(Alberta) Tom Appelman	1
(Alberta) Steve Petryk	3
(Alberta) Jamie King	5

Semifinals
(Finland) Markku Uusipaavalniemi	4
(Alberta) Brock Virtue	7
(Saskatchewan) Scott Bitz	6
(Alberta) Jamie King	7

Finals
(Alberta) Brock Virtue	2
(Alberta) Jamie King	5

== Women ==
=== Teams ===
Skip	Third	Second	Lead	Locale
Jill Andrews	Holly Jones	Theresa Wood	Stephanie Schroeder	Invermere, British Columbia
Shinobu Aota	Mayo Yamaura	Anna Ohmiya	Kotomi Ishizaki	Aomori, Japan
Penny Barker	Amanda Craigie	Danielle Sicinski	Tamara Haberstock	Moose Jaw, Saskatchewan
Jolene Campbell	Melissa Hoffman	Maegan Clark	Michelle McIvor	Humboldt, Saskatchewan
Nadine Chyz	Rebecca Pattison	Whitney More	Kimberly Anderson	Calgary, Alberta
Carolyn Darbyshire	Marcy Balderston	Raylene Rocque	Karen McNamee	Calgary, Alberta
Glenys Bakker (fourth)	Heather Jensen	Brenda Doroshuk (skip)	Carly Quigley	Calgary, Alberta
Tanilla Doyle	Lindsay Amudsen-Meyer	Janice Bailey	Christina Faulkner	Calgary, Alberta
Lisa Eyamie	Maria Bushell	Jodi Marthaller	Kyla MacLachlan	Calgary, Alberta
Diane Foster	Vicki Sjolie	Judy Pendergast	Cheryl Meek	Calgary, Alberta
Satsuki Fujisawa	Miyo Ichikawa	Emi Shimizu	Miyuki Satoh	Karuizawa, Japan
Lisa Johnson	Michelle Ries	Natalie Holloway	Shauna Nordstrom	Edmonton, Alberta
Kim Ji-Sun	Lee Seul-Bee	Gim Un-Chi	Lee Hyun-Jung	South Korea
Allison MacInnes	Grace MacInnes	Diane Gushulak	Amanda Guido	Kamloops, British Columbia
Eve Muirhead	Anna Sloan	Vicki Adams	Claire Hamilton	Perth, Scotland
Morgan Muise	Lyndsay Wegmann	Sarah Horne	Michelle Collin	Calgary, Alberta
Desirée Owen	Cary-Anne Sallows	Lindsay Makichuk	Stephanie Malekoff	Grande Prairie, Alberta
Sheri Pickering	Cheyanne Creasser	Karen Schiml	Donna Phillips	Calgary, Alberta
Vanessa Pouliot	Melissa Pierce	Megan Anderson	Jamie Forth	Edmonton, Alberta
Liudmila Privivkova	Anna Sidorova	Nkeiruka Ezekh	Ekaterina Galkina	Moscow, Russia
Casey Scheidegger	Kalynn Park	Jessie Scheidegger	Joelle Horn	Lethbridge, Alberta
Robyn Silvernagle	Kelsey Dutton	Dayna Demmans	Cristina Goertzen	Meadow Lake, Saskatchewan
Michele Smith (fourth)	Heather Armstrong	Shana Snell (skip)	Alanna Blackwell	Calgary, Alberta
Tiffany Steuber	Lisa Miller	Jenilee Goertzen	Cindy Westgard	Edmonton, Alberta
Jill Thurston	Kerri Einarson	Kendra Georges	Sarah Wazney	Winnipeg, Manitoba
Suzanne Walker	Dallas Luschyk	Heather-Anne Tomlinson	Yukako Tsuchiya	Edmonton, Alberta
Wang Bingyu	Liu Yin	Yue Qingshuang	Zhou Yan	Harbin, China
Crystal Webster	Erin Carmody	Geri-Lynn Ramsay	Samantha Preston	Calgary, Alberta
Holly Whyte	Heather Steele	Deanne Nichol	Carmen Barrack	Edmonton, Alberta
Jennifer Wickenheiser	Sandy Bell	Sonia Biemans	Yvette Krassman	Medicine Hatt, Alberta
Maria Yanko	Sarah Boechler	Cheryl Murtagh	Heather MacDonald	Calgary, Alberta
Olga Zyablikova	Ekaterina Antonova	Victorya Moiseeva	Galina Arsenkina	Moscow, Russia

=== Results ===
==== A-Event ====
Round of 16
(Russia) Liudmila Privivkova	10
(Alberta) Tiffany Steuber	1
(Japan) Shinobu Aota	6
(Alberta) Nadine Chyz	5
(South Korea) Kim Ji-Sun	9
(Alberta) Brenda Doroshuk	4
(Saskatchewan) Penny Barker	3
(Alberta) Casey Scheidegger	8
(Alberta) Desirée Owen	8
(British Columbia) Jill Andrews	5
(Saskatchewan) Robyn Silvernagle	12
(Alberta) Suzanne Walker	6
(Russia) Olga Zyablikova	9
(Alberta) Morgan Muise	3
(Alberta) Holly Whyte	3
(Alberta) Crystal Webster	6

Quarterfinals
(Russia) Liudmila Privivkova	4
(Japan) Shinobu Aota	5
(South Korea) Kim Ji-Sun	5
(Alberta) Casey Scheidegger	0
(Alberta) Desirée Owen	5
(Saskatchewan) Robyn Silvernagle	9
(Russia) Olga Zyablikova	4
(Alberta) Crystal Webster	8

Semifinals
(Japan) Shinobu Aota	0
(South Korea) Kim Ji-Sun	4
(Saskatchewan) Robyn Silvernagle	5
(Alberta) Crystal Webster	6

Qualifier 1
(South Korea) Kim Ji-Sun	4
(Alberta) Crystal Webster	5

Round of 16
(China) Wang Bingyu	5
(Alberta) Lisa Johnson	9
(Alberta) Sheri Pickering	3
(Japan) Satsuki Fujisawa	13
(Saskatchewan) Jolene Campbell	3
(Alberta) Tanilla Doyle	6
(Alberta) Jennifer Wickenheiser	8
(Alberta) Lisa Eyamie	4
(Scotland) Eve Muirhead	6
(British Columbia) Allison MacInnes	2
(Alberta) Maria Yanko	4
(Alberta) Diane Foster	8
(Alberta) Carolyn Darbyshire	7
(Alberta) Vanessa Pouliot	4
(Alberta) Shana Snell	7
(Manitoba) Jill Thurston	0

Quarterfinals
(Alberta) Lisa Johnson	3
(Japan) Satsuki Fujisawa	6
(Alberta) Tanilla Doyle	6
(Alberta) Jennifer Wickenheiser	4
(Scotland) Eve Muirhead	9
(Alberta) Diane Foster	4
(Alberta) Carolyn Darbyshire	6
(Alberta) Shana Snell	7

Semifinals
(Japan) Satsuki Fujisawa	9
(Alberta) Tanilla Doyle	2
(Scotland) Eve Muirhead	6
(Alberta) Shana Snell	3

Qualifier 2
(Japan) Satsuki Fujisawa	3
(Scotland) Eve Muirhead	4

==== B-Event ====
Second Knockout
(Alberta) Tiffany Steuber	1
(Alberta) Nadine Chyz	6
(Saskatchewan) Penny Barker	9
(Alberta) Brenda Doroshuk	2

Quarterfinals
(Alberta) Desirée Owen	3
(Alberta) Nadine Chyz	4
(Russia) Olga Zyablikova	4
(Saskatchewan) Penny Barker	5

Semifinals
(Alberta) Nadine Chyz	5
(Alberta) Tanilla Doyle	4
(Saskatchewan) Penny Barker	8
(Alberta) Shana Snell	3

To Qualifier 3
(Alberta) Nadine Chyz	11
(Saskatchewan) Penny Barker	5

Second Knockout
(British Columbia) Jill Andrews	8
(Alberta) Suzanne Walker	6
(Alberta) Morgan Muise	5
(Alberta) Holly Whyte	8

Quarterfinals
(Russia) Liudmila Privivkova	9
(British Columbia) Jill Andrews	2
(Alberta) Casey Scheidegger	8
(Alberta) Holly Whyte	4

Semifinals
(Russia) Liudmila Privivkova	4
(Alberta) Casey Scheidegger	5

To Qualifier 3
(Alberta) Casey Scheidegger	2
(South Korea) Kim Ji-Sun	5
Qualifier 3
(Alberta) Nadine Chyz	7
(South Korea) Kim Ji-Sun	6

Second Knockout
(China) Wang Bingyu	8
(Alberta) Sheri Pickering	2
(Saskatchewan) Jolene Campbell	2
(Alberta) Lisa Eyamie	10

Quarterfinals
(Alberta) Diane Foster	2
(China) Wang Bingyu	6
(Alberta) Carolyn Darbyshire	3
(Alberta) Lisa Eyamie	6

Semifinals
(China) Wang Bingyu	5
(Japan) Shinobu Aota	2
(Alberta) Lisa Eyamie	10
(Saskatchewan) Robyn Silvernagle	5

To Qualifier 4
(China) Wang Bingyu	6
(Alberta) Lisa Eyamie	4

Second Knockout
(British Columbia) Allison MacInnes	7
(Alberta) Maria Yanko	6
(Alberta) Vanessa Pouliot	4
(Manitoba) Jill Thurston	7

Quarterfinals
(Alberta) Lisa Johnson	9
(British Columbia) Allison MacInnes	10
(Alberta) Jennifer Wickenheiser	1
(Manitoba) Jill Thurston	7

Semifinals
(British Columbia) Allison MacInnes	4
(Manitoba) Jill Thurston	5

To Qualifier 4
(Manitoba) Jill Thurston	5
(Japan) Satsuki Fujisawa	4
Qualifier 4
(China) Wang Bingyu	7
(Manitoba) Jill Thurston	0

==== C-Event ====
Third Knockout
(Alberta) Tiffany Steuber	7
(Alberta) Brenda Doroshuk	3
(Alberta) Diane Foster	8
(Alberta) Carolyn Darbyshire	7

Quarterfinals
(Japan) Shinobu Aota	8
(Alberta) Tiffany Steuber	1
(British Columbia) Allison MacInnes	1
(Alberta) Diane Foster	10

Semifinals
(Japan) Shinobu Aota	5
(Alberta) Diane Foster	6

Qualifier 5
(Alberta) Diane Foster	2
(Manitoba) Jill Thurston	8

Third Knockout
(Alberta) Suzanne Walker	8
(Alberta) Morgan Muise	6

Quarterfinals
(Alberta) Lisa Johnson	7
(Alberta) Jennifer Wickenheiser	4
(Saskatchewan) Robyn Silvernagle	12
(Alberta) Suzanne Walker	1

Semifinals
(Alberta) Lisa Johnson	7
(Alberta) Casey Scheidegger	3
(Saskatchewan) Robyn Silvernagle	3
(Saskatchewan) Penny Barker	7

Qualifier 6
(Alberta) Lisa Johnson	4
(Saskatchewan) Penny Barker	3

Third Knockout
(Alberta) Sheri Pickering	4
(Saskatchewan) Jolene Campbell	8

Quarterfinals
(Alberta) Shana Snell	7
(Saskatchewan) Jolene Campbell	6
(British Columbia) Jill Andrews	2
(Alberta) Holly Whyte	9

Semifinals
(Alberta) Shana Snell	2
(Japan) Satsuki Fujisawa	7
(Alberta) Holly Whyte	8
(Alberta) Lisa Eyamie	6

Qualifier 7
(Japan) Satsuki Fujisawa	6
(Alberta) Holly Whyte	5

Third Knockout
(Alberta) Desirée Owen	3
(Russia) Olga Zyablikova	4
(Alberta) Maria Yanko	4
(Alberta) Vanessa Pouliot	5

Quarterfinals
(Russia) Liudmila Privivkova	7
(Russia) Olga Zyablikova	1
(Alberta) Tanilla Doyle	7
(Alberta) Vanessa Pouliot	6

Semifinals
(Russia) Liudmila Privivkova	7
(Alberta) Tanilla Doyle	4

Qualifier 8
(Russia) Liudmila Privivkova	9
(South Korea) Kim Ji-Sun	8

=== Playoffs ===
Quarterfinals
(Alberta) Crystal Webster	6
(Manitoba) Jill Thurston	4
(China) Wang Bingyu	7
(Alberta) Lisa Johnson	4
(Scotland) Eve Muirhead	4
(Russia) Liudmila Privivkova	3
(Alberta) Nadine Chyz	8
(Japan) Satsuki Fujisawa	0

Semifinals
(Alberta) Crystal Webster	7
(China) Wang Bingyu	1
(Scotland) Eve Muirhead	8
(Alberta) Nadine Chyz	6

Finals
(Alberta) Crystal Webster	3
(Scotland) Eve Muirhead	6
