= 2013 Medicine Hat Charity Classic =

- Host city: Medicine Hat, Alberta
- Arena: Medicine Hat Curling Club
- Dates: October 18–21
- Men's winner: (Saskatchewan) Randy Bryden
- Curling club: Callie Curling Club, Regina Saskatchewan
- Skip: Randy Bryden
- Third: Troy Robinson
- Second: Brennen Jones
- Lead: Trent Knapp
- Finalist: (Saskatchewan) Scott Bitz
- Women's winner: (Russia) Anna Sidorova
- Curling club: Moskvitch Curling Club, Moscow, Russia
- Skip: Anna Sidorova
- Third: Margarita Fomina
- Second: Aleksandra Saitova
- Lead: Ekaterina Galkina
- Finalist: (Japan) Sayaka Yoshimura

The 2013 Medicine Hat Charity Classic was held from October 18 to 21 at the Medicine Hat Curling Club in Medicine Hat, Alberta as part of the 2013–14 World Curling Tour. Both the men's and women's events were held in a triple-knockout format. The purse for the men's event was CAD$34,000, of which the winner received CAD$10,000, while the purse for the women's event was CAD$30,000, of which the winner received CAD$8,000.

It was an all-Saskatchewan final on the men's side with two teams from Regina against each other, with Randy Bryden defeating Scott Bitz. On the women's side, it was an international affair with Russia's Anna Sidorova defeating Japan's Sayaka Yoshimura.

== Men ==
=== Teams ===
The teams are listed as follows:

Skip	Third	Second	Lead	Locale
Kevin Aberle	Tim Krassman	Sheldon Schafer	Donny Zahn	Medicine Hat, Alberta
Scott Bitz	Jeff Sharp	Aryn Schmidt	Dean Hicke	Regina, Saskatchewan
Matthew Blandford	Darren Moulding	Brent Hamilton	Brad Chyz	Calgary, Alberta
Randy Bryden	Troy Robinson	Brennen Jones	Trent Knapp	Regina, Saskatchewan
Trevor Funk	Travis Funk	Denton Koch	John Owsjanikow	Medicine Hat, Alberta
Brad Heidt	Drew Heidt	Mitch Heidt	Mitch George	Kerrobert, Saskatchewan
Josh Heidt	Brock Montgomery	Matt Lang	Dustin Kidby	Kerrobert, Saskatchewan
Lloyd Hill	Scott Egger	Greg Hill	Maurice Sonier	Calgary, Alberta
Kim Soo-hyuk	Kim Tae-huan	Park Jong-duk	Nam Yoon-ho	South Korea
Jamie King	Blake MacDonald	Scott Pfeifer	Jeff Erickson	Edmonton, Alberta
Max Kirkpatrick	Shaun Meachem	Jeff Chambers	Shawn Hiebert	Swift Current, Saskatchewan
Dean Mamer	Vance Elder	Jason Stannard	Wallace Hollingshead	Calgary, Alberta
Scott Manners	Carl Smith	Ryan Deis	Mark Larsen	North Battleford, Saskatchewan
Yusuke Morozumi	Tsuyoshi Yamaguchi	Tetsuro Shimizu	Kosuke Morozumi	Karuizawa, Japan
Sean O'Connor	Rob Johnson	Ryan O'Connor	Dan Bubola	Calgary, Alberta
Kevin Park	Barry Chwedoruk	Eric Richard	Doug Stambaugh	Edmonton, Alberta
Tom Sallows	Jordan Steinke	Matthew Brown	Kendell Warawa	Edmonton, Alberta
Robert Schlender	Aaron Sluchinski	Justin Sluchinski	Dylan Webster	Airdrie, Alberta
John Stroh	Jeff Bodin	Matt Heller	Shea Jackson	Medicine Hat, Alberta
Charley Thomas	Colin Hodgson	Matthew Ng	Mike Westlund	Calgary, Alberta
Wang Fengchun	Jiang Dongxu	Chen Han	Wang Zhiqiang	Harbin, China
Wade White	Kevin Tym	Dan Holowaychuk	George White	Edmonton, Alberta
Randy Woytowich	Gary Scheirich	Dustin Kalthoff	Cory Spanier	Saskatoon, Saskatchewan
Zou Dejia	Bai Yang	Wang Jinbo	Zhang Rongrui	Harbin, China

=== Playoffs ===
Quarterfinals
(Saskatchewan) Scott Bitz	6
(South Korea) Kim Soo-hyuk	1
(Saskatchewan) Max Kirkpatrick	6
(Saskatchewan) Josh Heidt	2
(Saskatchewan) Randy Bryden	5
(Alberta) Robert Schlender	4
(Alberta) Wade White	4
(Alberta) Jamie King	7

Semifinals
(Saskatchewan) Scott Bitz	6
(Saskatchewan) Max Kirkpatrick	4
(Saskatchewan) Randy Bryden	7
(Alberta) Jamie King	6

Final
(Saskatchewan) Scott Bitz	2
(Saskatchewan) Randy Bryden	7

== Women ==
=== Teams ===
The teams are listed as follows:

Skip	Third	Second	Lead	Locale
Glenys Bakker	Karen Morrison	Barb McDonald	Sandy Bell	Calgary, Alberta
Brett Barber	Samantha Yachiw	Meaghan Freirichs	Kaitlyn Bowman	Biggar, Saskatchewan
Norma Brown	Katie Crump	Heather Wilson	Tracy Slatnik	Alberta
Tanilla Doyle	Lindsay Amundsen-Meyer	Dayna Connolly	Christina Faulkner	Calgary, Alberta
Chantelle Eberle	Cindy Ricci	Nancy Inglis	Debbie Lozinski	Regina, Saskatchewan
Diane Foster	Judy Pendergast	Terri Loblaw	Sue Fulkerth	Calgary, Alberta
Satsuki Fujisawa	Miyo Ichikawa	Emi Shimizu	Miyuki Satoh	Karuizawa, Japan
Tiffany Game	Vanessa Pouliot	Jennifer Van Wieren	Melissa Pierce	Edmonton, Alberta
Teryn Hamilton	Hayley Furst	Jody Keim	Heather Hansen	Calgary, Alberta
Michèle Jäggi	Marisa Winkelhausen	Stéphanie Jäggi	Melanie Barbezat	Bern, Switzerland
Heather Jensen	Darah Provencal	Shana Snell	Morgan Muise	Calgary, Alberta
Lisa Johnson	Michelle Kryzalka	Natalie Holloway	Shauna Nordstrom	Spruce Grove, Alberta
Mari Motohashi	Yurika Yoshida	Yumi Suzuki	Megumi Mabuchi	Kitami, Japan
Amy Nixon	Nadine Chyz	Whitney Eckstrand	Heather Rogers	Calgary, Alberta
Ayumi Ogasawara	Yumie Funayama	Kaho Onodera	Chinami Yoshida	Sapporo, Japan
Casey Scheidegger	Denise Kinghorn	Jessie Scheidegger	Kimberly Anderson	Lethbridge, Alberta
Anna Sidorova	Margarita Fomina	Aleksandra Saitova	Ekaterina Galkina	Moscow, Russia
Holly Whyte	Heather Steele	Deena Benoit	Karynn Flory	Edmonton, Alberta
Kelly Wood	Teejay Haichert	Janelle Tyler	Kelsey Dutton	Swift Current, Saskatchewan
Sayaka Yoshimura	Rina Ida	Risa Ujihara	Mao Ishigaki	Sapporo, Japan

=== Playoffs ===
Quarterfinals
(Japan) Satsuki Fujisawa	5
(Japan) Sayaka Yoshimura	6
(Switzerland) Michèle Jäggi	6
(Alberta) Amy Nixon	4
(Saskatchewan) Chantelle Eberle	0
(Alberta) Casey Scheidegger	7
(Russia) Anna Sidorova	6
(Alberta) Glenys Bakker	2

Semifinals
(Japan) Sayaka Yoshimura	8
(Switzerland) Michèle Jäggi	2
(Alberta) Casey Scheidegger	5
(Russia) Anna Sidorova	6

Final
(Japan) Sayaka Yoshimura	2
(Russia) Anna Sidorova	8
