= 2010 Horizon Laser Vision Center Classic =

- Host city: Regina, Saskatchewan
- Arena: Tartan Curling Club
- Dates: October 1–4
- Winner: (Saskatchewan) Randy Bryden
- Curling club: Regina, Saskatchewan
- Skip: Randy Bryden
- Third: Troy Robinson
- Second: Trent Knapp
- Lead: Kelly Knapp
- Finalist: (Saskatchewan) Carl deConinck Smith

The 2010 Horizon Laser Vision Center Classic was held from October 1 to October 4 at the Tartan Curling Club in Regina, Saskatchewan. The cash purse of the event was CAD$16,000. The event was held in a round-robin format.

In an all-Saskatchewan final, Randy Bryden defeated Carl deConinck Smith in an extra end, 5–4.

== Teams ==
Skip	Third	Second	Lead	Locale
Jason Ackerman	Andrew Foreman	Ryan Sveinbjornson	Curtis Horwath	(Saskatchewan) Regina
Art Assman	Bob Sonder	Ian Kelln	Bob Ziegler	(Saskatchewan) Regina
Scott Bitz	Mark Lang	Aryn Schmidt	Dean Hicke	(Saskatchewan) Regina
Randy Bryden	Troy Robinson	Trent Knapp	Kelly Knapp	(Saskatchewan) Regina
Warren Cross	Kris Watkins	Jeremy Hodges	Matt Willerton	(Alberta) Edmonton
Carl deConinck Smith	Jeff Sharp	Chris Haichert	Jesse St. John	(Saskatchewan) Rosetown
Mike Eberle	Shane Vollman	Stephen Perras	Shaun Seiferling	(Saskatchewan) Regina
Darren Engel	Ryan Deis	Jason Barnhart	Drew Wilby	(Saskatchewan) Regina
David Haines	Rory McCusker (fourth)	Mitchel Ryan	Eric Edmands	(Saskatchewan) Regina
Brad Hebert	Ben Hebert	Kyle George	Bruce Hebert	(Saskatchewan) Regina
Mark Hebert	Rob Auckland	Chad Jones	Travis Gansauge	(Saskatchewan) Moose Jaw
Jamey Jordison	Garret Vey	Shawn Meyer	Matt Froehlich	(Saskatchewan) Moose Jaw
Joel Jordison	Jason Jacobson	Brock Montgomery	Aaron Shutra	Saskatchewan
Clint Krismer	Kevin Fetsch	Chad Sveinbjornson	Geoff Gilbert	Saskatchewan
Brad Law	Scott Comfort	David Kidby	Dustin Kidby	(Saskatchewan) Regina
Kelly Marnoch	Kevin Hamblin	Tyler Waterhouse	Christ Cameron	(Manitoba) Carberry
Braeden Moskowy	Kirk Muyres	Colton Flasch	Matt Lang	(Saskatchewan) Regina
Jerod Roland	John Lilla	Adam Nathan	Cooper Smith	(North Dakota) Minot
Jamie Schneider	Caitlin Schneider (fourth)	Daniel Marsh	Kevin Marsh	(Saskatchewan) Kronau
Daniel Selke	Spencer Lowe	Mat Ring	Brandon Leippi	(Saskatchewan) Regina
Pat Simmons	Steve Laycock	Brennen Jones	Dallan Muyres	(Saskatchewan) Davidson
Jeff Tait	Brent Goeres	Mike Fox	Todd Bakken	(Saskatchewan) Regina
Randy Woytowich	Clint Dieno	Dustin Kalthoff	Lyndon Holm	(Saskatchewan) Regina
Xu Xiaoming	Zhang Jialiang	Zhang Zhipeng	Ba Dexin	(China) Harbin

== Round robin ==
=== Standings ===
Group A			Group B			Group C			Group D		
Skip	W	L	Skip	W	L	Skip	W	L	Skip	W	L
(Saskatchewan) Pat Simmons	5	0	(China) Xu Xiaoming	5	0	(Saskatchewan) Carl deConinck Smith	4	1	(Saskatchewan) Scott Bitz	5	0
(Saskatchewan) Mark Herbert	4	1	(Saskatchewan) Jeff Tait	4	1	(Saskatchewan) Jamie Schneider	4	1	(Saskatchewan) Randy Bryden	3	2
(Saskatchewan) Darren Engel	3	2	(Saskatchewan) Joel Jordison	3	2	(Saskatchewan) Jason Ackerman	3	2	(Alberta) Warren Cross	3	2
(Manitoba) Kelly Marnoch	2	3	(North Dakota) Jerod Roland	2	3	(Saskatchewan) Mike Eberle	1	4	(Saskatchewan) Brad Hebert	2	3
(Saskatchewan) Brad Law	1	4	(Saskatchewan) Clint Krismer	1	4	(Saskatchewan) Art Assman	1	4	(Saskatchewan) Jamey Jordison	1	4
(Saskatchewan) David Haines	0	5	(Saskatchewan) Braeden Moskowy	0	5	(Saskatchewan) Randy Woytowich	0	5	(Saskatchewan) Daniel Selke	1	4

=== Results ===
==== Draw 1 ====
Friday, October 1, 4:30pm

Team	1	2	3	4	5	6	7	8	Final
(China) Xu Xiaoming 🔨	0	0	0	3	1	1	2	X	7
(Saskatchewan) Braeden Moskowy	0	1	2	0	0	0	0	X	3

Team	1	2	3	4	5	6	7	8	Final
(North Dakota) Jerod Roland	0	0	0	0	0	1	0	X	1
(Saskatchewan) Joel Jordison 🔨	2	0	0	1	2	0	1	X	6

Team	1	2	3	4	5	6	7	8	Final
(Saskatchewan) Daniel Selke	0	0	1	1	0	1	0	X	3
(Saskatchewan) Brad Hebert 🔨	0	3	0	0	3	0	1	X	7

Team	1	2	3	4	5	6	7	8	Final
(Saskatchewan) Brad Law	0	2	0	2	0	0	0	1	5
(Saskatchewan) Darren Engel 🔨	3	0	1	0	0	2	0	0	6

Team	1	2	3	4	5	6	7	8	9	Final
(Saskatchewan) Pat Simmons 🔨	3	0	0	0	0	1	1	0	1	6
(Saskatchewan) Mark Herbert	0	2	0	1	1	0	0	1	0	5

==== Draw 2 ====
Friday, October 1, 8:00pm

Team	1	2	3	4	5	6	7	8	Final
(Saskatchewan) Jeff Tait	0	2	0	0	1	1	0	2	6
(Saskatchewan) Clint Krismer 🔨	1	0	3	0	0	0	1	0	5

Team	1	2	3	4	5	6	7	8	Final
(Saskatchewan) Carl deConinck Smith 🔨	3	0	0	0	3	2	X	X	8
(Saskatchewan) Randy Woytowich	0	0	0	2	0	0	X	X	2

Team	1	2	3	4	5	6	7	8	Final
(Saskatchewan) Randy Bryden	0	3	0	1	0	1	0	0	5
(Saskatchewan) Scott Bitz 🔨	1	0	1	0	1	0	2	1	6

Team	1	2	3	4	5	6	7	8	Final
(Saskatchewan) David Haines	0	1	1	1	0	0	1	X	4
(Manitoba) Kelly Marnoch 🔨	2	0	0	0	2	3	0	X	7

Team	1	2	3	4	5	6	7	8	Final
(Alberta) Warren Cross	0	4	0	3	0	2	0	X	9
(Saskatchewan) Jamey Jordison 🔨	1	0	1	0	3	0	1	X	6

Team	1	2	3	4	5	6	7	8	Final
(Saskatchewan) Mike Eberle 🔨	0	1	0	1	2	0	0	2	6
(Saskatchewan) Art Assman	1	0	1	0	0	1	1	0	4

Team	1	2	3	4	5	6	7	8	Final
(Saskatchewan) Jamie Schneider	0	0	1	0	0	0	1	X	2
(Saskatchewan) Jason Ackerman 🔨	0	2	0	2	1	0	0	X	5

==== Draw 3 ====
Saturday, October 2, 10:30am

Team	1	2	3	4	5	6	7	8	Final
(Saskatchewan) Jamie Schneider 🔨	1	0	1	3	0	1	X	X	6
(Saskatchewan) Randy Woytowich	0	0	0	0	1	0	X	X	1

Team	1	2	3	4	5	6	7	8	Final
(Manitoba) Kelly Marnoch 🔨	1	0	0	0	2	0	0	X	3
(Saskatchewan) Pat Simmons	0	1	1	0	0	2	2	X	6

Team	1	2	3	4	5	6	7	8	9	Final
(Saskatchewan) Mike Eberle 🔨	1	1	0	2	0	0	1	1	0	6
(Saskatchewan) Carl deConinck Smith	0	0	4	0	0	2	0	0	1	7

Team	1	2	3	4	5	6	7	8	Final
(Saskatchewan) Brad Hebert 🔨	0	0	2	0	0	0	X	X	2
(Saskatchewan) Jamey Jordison	1	1	0	1	1	3	X	X	7

Team	1	2	3	4	5	6	7	8	Final
(Saskatchewan) Art Assman	0	1	0	1	0	0	X	X	2
(Saskatchewan) Jason Ackerman 🔨	1	0	1	0	4	2	X	X	8

Team	1	2	3	4	5	6	7	8	Final
(Saskatchewan) Daniel Selke 🔨	0	0	0	0	1	0	0	X	1
(Saskatchewan) Randy Bryden	1	0	1	0	0	2	0	X	4

Team	1	2	3	4	5	6	7	8	Final
(Saskatchewan) David Haines 🔨	0	0	0	1	0	1	X	X	2
(Saskatchewan) Brad Law	3	3	0	0	1	0	X	X	7

Team	1	2	3	4	5	6	7	8	Final
(Saskatchewan) Mark Herbert 🔨	2	0	1	0	3	0	0	0	6
(Saskatchewan) Darren Engel	0	1	0	1	0	0	2	1	5

==== Draw 4 ====
Saturday, October 2, 3:30pm

Team	1	2	3	4	5	6	7	8	Final
(Saskatchewan) Pat Simmons	1	1	2	0	0	1	2	X	7
(Saskatchewan) David Haines 🔨	0	0	0	1	1	0	0	X	2

Team	1	2	3	4	5	6	7	8	Final
(North Dakota) Jerod Roland	0	0	1	0	0	X	X	X	1
(Saskatchewan) Jeff Tait 🔨	2	2	0	3	2	X	X	X	9

Team	1	2	3	4	5	6	7	8	Final
(Saskatchewan) Brad Law	0	0	0	1	0	1	X	X	2
(Saskatchewan) Mark Herbert 🔨	0	0	4	0	3	0	X	X	7

Team	1	2	3	4	5	6	7	8	Final
(Saskatchewan) Jamey Jordison	1	0	2	0	1	0	0	0	4
(Saskatchewan) Daniel Selke 🔨	0	2	0	1	0	1	1	1	6

Team	1	2	3	4	5	6	7	8	Final
(Alberta) Warren Cross 🔨	1	0	0	1	0	0	2	0	4
(Saskatchewan) Randy Bryden	0	1	0	0	2	1	0	2	6

Team	1	2	3	4	5	6	7	8	Final
(Saskatchewan) Clint Krismer 🔨	1	0	0	3	0	1	1	X	6
(Saskatchewan) Braeden Moskowy	0	0	1	0	2	0	0	X	3

Team	1	2	3	4	5	6	7	8	Final
(Saskatchewan) Brad Hebert	0	0	2	0	0	X	X	X	2
(Saskatchewan) Scott Bitz 🔨	2	3	0	2	1	X	X	X	8

Team	1	2	3	4	5	6	7	8	Final
(Saskatchewan) Jamie Schneider 🔨	0	0	3	0	0	3	0	0	6
(Saskatchewan) Carl deConinck Smith	0	0	0	1	2	0	2	0	5

Team	1	2	3	4	5	6	7	8	Final
(China) Xu Xiaoming	0	2	0	2	0	0	3	X	7
(Saskatchewan) Joel Jordison 🔨	0	0	0	0	2	1	0	X	3

==== Draw 5 ====
Saturday, October 2, 7:30pm

Team	1	2	3	4	5	6	7	8	Final
(Saskatchewan) Joel Jordison 🔨	2	0	0	1	0	0	0	2	5
(Saskatchewan) Clint Krismer	0	1	1	0	1	1	0	0	4

Team	1	2	3	4	5	6	7	8	Final
(Saskatchewan) Scott Bitz 🔨	1	0	0	2	0	2	0	0	5
(Alberta) Warren Cross	0	0	1	0	1	0	1	1	4

Team	1	2	3	4	5	6	7	8	Final
(Saskatchewan) Art Assman 🔨	1	0	0	0	0	0	1	3	5
(Saskatchewan) Randy Woytowich	0	0	2	0	0	1	0	0	3

Team	1	2	3	4	5	6	7	8	Final
(Saskatchewan) Braeden Moskowy	0	1	0	1	0	2	0	0	4
(Saskatchewan) Jeff Tait 🔨	1	0	1	0	1	0	3	1	7

Team	1	2	3	4	5	6	7	8	Final
(North Dakota) Jerod Roland	0	1	0	1	0	0	0	X	2
(China) Xu Xiaoming 🔨	2	0	0	0	0	2	2	X	6

Team	1	2	3	4	5	6	7	8	Final
(Saskatchewan) Jason Ackerman	1	0	2	0	1	0	1	X	5
(Saskatchewan) Mike Eberle 🔨	0	2	0	2	0	4	0	X	8

Team	1	2	3	4	5	6	7	8	Final
(Saskatchewan) Darren Engel 🔨	0	1	3	0	3	X	X	X	7
(Manitoba) Kelly Marnoch	1	0	0	1	0	X	X	X	2

==== Draw 6 ====
Sunday, October 3, 10:00am

Team	1	2	3	4	5	6	7	8	Final
(Saskatchewan) Carl deConinck Smith	0	1	0	0	1	0	0	2	4
(Saskatchewan) Jason Ackerman 🔨	1	0	0	0	0	1	1	0	3

Team	1	2	3	4	5	6	7	8	Final
(Saskatchewan) Mark Herbert 🔨	2	1	3	0	0	2	X	X	8
(Saskatchewan) David Haines	0	0	0	1	1	0	X	X	2

Team	1	2	3	4	5	6	7	8	Final
(Manitoba) Kelly Marnoch 🔨	1	2	2	0	2	0	1	X	8
(Saskatchewan) Brad Law	0	0	0	2	0	2	0	X	4

Team	1	2	3	4	5	6	7	8	Final
(Saskatchewan) Scott Bitz 🔨	0	0	2	0	2	0	2	3	9
(Saskatchewan) Jamey Jordison	0	1	0	2	0	1	0	0	4

Team	1	2	3	4	5	6	7	8	Final
(Saskatchewan) Randy Woytowich 🔨	1	0	2	0	0	0	0	0	3
(Saskatchewan) Mike Eberle	0	2	0	2	0	0	0	2	6

Team	1	2	3	4	5	6	7	8	Final
(Saskatchewan) Pat Simmons 🔨	0	1	0	2	0	0	1	2	6
(Saskatchewan) Darren Engel	0	0	1	0	1	0	0	0	2

Team	1	2	3	4	5	6	7	8	9	Final
(Saskatchewan) Brad Hebert 🔨	1	0	0	2	0	2	1	0	1	7
(Saskatchewan) Randy Bryden	0	0	2	0	3	0	0	1	0	6

Team	1	2	3	4	5	6	7	8	Final
(Alberta) Warren Cross 🔨	0	1	1	0	1	0	3	X	6
(Saskatchewan) Daniel Selke	1	0	0	0	0	1	0	X	2

==== Draw 7 ====
Sunday, October 3, 1:30pm

Team	1	2	3	4	5	6	7	8	Final
(Saskatchewan) Daniel Selke	0	1	0	0	1	0	X	X	2
(Saskatchewan) Scott Bitz 🔨	1	0	2	1	0	3	X	X	7

Team	1	2	3	4	5	6	7	8	Final
(Alberta) Warren Cross	0	1	1	0	2	0	1	X	5
(Saskatchewan) Brad Hebert 🔨	1	0	0	1	0	1	0	X	3

Team	1	2	3	4	5	6	7	8	Final
(Saskatchewan) Joel Jordison 🔨	2	0	0	0	2	0	2	0	6
(Saskatchewan) Braeden Moskowy	0	0	0	2	0	2	0	1	5

Team	1	2	3	4	5	6	7	8	Final
(Saskatchewan) Brad Law	0	0	0	0	X	X	X	X	0
(Saskatchewan) Pat Simmons 🔨	4	1	4	3	X	X	X	X	12

Team	1	2	3	4	5	6	7	8	Final
(Saskatchewan) Randy Bryden 🔨	1	0	2	5	X	X	X	X	8
(Saskatchewan) Jamey Jordison	0	1	0	0	X	X	X	X	1

Team	1	2	3	4	5	6	7	8	Final
(Saskatchewan) Jamie Schneider 🔨	1	2	0	5	X	X	X	X	8
(Saskatchewan) Art Assman	0	0	1	0	X	X	X	X	1

Team	1	2	3	4	5	6	7	8	Final
(Saskatchewan) Jeff Tait 🔨	1	0	0	1	0	1	0	0	3
(China) Xu Xiaoming	0	2	1	0	1	0	0	1	5

Team	1	2	3	4	5	6	7	8	Final
(Saskatchewan) Clint Krismer 🔨	1	1	0	2	0	1	0	0	5
(North Dakota) Jerod Roland	0	0	1	0	2	0	1	2	6

==== Draw 8 ====
Sunday, October 3, 5:00pm

Team	1	2	3	4	5	6	7	8	Final
(Saskatchewan) Mark Herbert 🔨	2	3	1	0	1	1	X	X	8
(Manitoba) Kelly Marnoch	0	0	0	3	0	0	X	X	3

Team	1	2	3	4	5	6	7	8	Final
(Saskatchewan) Mike Eberle 🔨	0	1	2	0	1	0	1	0	5
(Saskatchewan) Jamie Schneider	0	0	0	2	0	3	0	1	6

Team	1	2	3	4	5	6	7	8	Final
(Saskatchewan) David Haines	0	2	0	0	0	1	0	X	3
(Saskatchewan) Darren Engel 🔨	1	0	2	1	1	0	1	X	6

Team	1	2	3	4	5	6	7	8	Final
(Saskatchewan) Carl deConinck Smith 🔨	5	2	4	X	X	X	X	X	11
(Saskatchewan) Art Assman	0	0	0	X	X	X	X	X	0

Team	1	2	3	4	5	6	7	8	Final
(Saskatchewan) Jeff Tait 🔨	2	3	0	0	0	0	0	1	6
(Saskatchewan) Joel Jordison	0	0	1	1	1	0	1	0	4

Team	1	2	3	4	5	6	7	8	9	Final
(Saskatchewan) Clint Krismer	0	2	2	0	1	0	0	2	0	7
(China) Xu Xiaoming 🔨	2	0	0	2	0	1	2	0	1	8

Team	1	2	3	4	5	6	7	8	Final
(Saskatchewan) Braeden Moskowy 🔨	1	0	1	0	0	1	1	X	4
(North Dakota) Jerod Roland	0	1	0	1	3	0	0	X	5

Team	1	2	3	4	5	6	7	8	Final
(Saskatchewan) Randy Woytowich	0	0	0	0	2	0	0	X	2
(Saskatchewan) Jason Ackerman 🔨	0	1	1	1	0	1	2	X	6

== Tiebreaker ==
Sunday, October 3, 8:00pm

Team	1	2	3	4	5	6	7	8	Final
(Saskatchewan) Randy Bryden	0	1	2	0	3	0	0	X	6
(Alberta) Warren Cross	1	0	0	1	0	1	0	X	3

== Playoffs ==
Quarterfinals
(Saskatchewan) Pat Simmons	6
(Saskatchewan) Jeff Tait	4
(Saskatchewan) Scott Bitz	4
(Saskatchewan) Carl deConinck Smith	7
(Saskatchewan) Mark Herbert	2
(Saskatchewan) Jamie Schneider	5
(Saskatchewan) Randy Bryden	8
(China) Xu Xiaoming	4

Semifinals
(Saskatchewan) Pat Simmons	3
(Saskatchewan) Carl deConinck Smith	5
(Saskatchewan) Jamie Schneider	3
(Saskatchewan) Randy Bryden	7

Final
(Saskatchewan) Carl deConinck Smith	4
(Saskatchewan) Randy Bryden	5

=== Quarterfinals ===
Monday, October 4, 10:00am

Team	1	2	3	4	5	6	7	8	Final
(Saskatchewan) Pat Simmons	0	2	0	0	1	0	3	X	6
(Saskatchewan) Jeff Tait 🔨	2	0	1	0	0	1	0	X	4

Team	1	2	3	4	5	6	7	8	Final
(Saskatchewan) Scott Bitz	1	0	1	2	0	0	0	0	4
(Saskatchewan) Carl deConinck Smith 🔨	0	2	0	0	1	1	1	2	7

Team	1	2	3	4	5	6	7	8	Final
(Saskatchewan) Mark Hebert 🔨	1	0	0	0	0	1	0	X	2
(Saskatchewan) Jamie Schneider	0	1	2	1	1	0	0	X	5

Team	1	2	3	4	5	6	7	8	Final
(Saskatchewan) Randy Bryden	0	1	0	2	0	4	1	X	8
(China) Xu Xiaoming 🔨	1	0	2	0	1	0	0	X	4

=== Semifinals ===
Monday, October 4, 1:00pm

Team	1	2	3	4	5	6	7	8	Final
(Saskatchewan) Pat Simmons	1	0	0	0	2	0	0	X	3
(Saskatchewan) Carl deConinck Smith 🔨	0	1	1	1	0	0	2	X	5

Team	1	2	3	4	5	6	7	8	Final
(Saskatchewan) Jamie Schneider	0	0	1	0	0	2	0	X	3
(Saskatchewan) Randy Bryden 🔨	0	3	0	1	1	0	2	X	7

=== Final ===
Monday, October 4, 4:00pm

Team	1	2	3	4	5	6	7	8	9	Final
(Saskatchewan) Carl deConinck Smith	0	0	0	0	2	1	0	1	0	4
(Saskatchewan) Randy Bryden 🔨	0	0	0	2	0	0	2	0	1	5
