= 2010 Meyers Norris Penny Charity Classic =

- Host city: Medicine Hat, Alberta
- Arena: Medicine Hat Curling Club
- Dates: Oct. 15-18
- Men's winner: Pat Simmons
- Curling club: Davidson CC, Davidson, Saskatchewan
- Skip: Pat Simmons
- Third: Steve Laycock
- Second: Brennen Jones
- Lead: Dallan Muyres
- Finalist: Ted Appelman
- Women's winner: Jessie Kaufman
- Curling club: Saville SC, Edmonton, Alberta
- Skip: Jessie Kaufman
- Third: Nicky Kaufman
- Second: Amanda Coderre
- Lead: Stephanie Enright
- Finalist: Eve Muirhead

The 2010 Meyers Norris Penny Charity Classic was held Oct. 15-18, 2010 in Medicine Hat, Alberta. It was held on week six of the 2010-11 World Curling Tour season. It featured both men's and women's events.

Moose Jaw, Saskatchewan's Pat Simmons rink won the men's final, defeating Edmonton, Alberta's Ted Appelman in the final, 5–4. Simmons and his team took home $10,000 for winning. The winnings put Simmons in the top spot on the Tour's ranking for the time being, having made the playoffs in all four events the team had played that season.

In the women's final, Edmonton's Jessie Kaufman rink defeated Scotland's Eve Muirhead 5–3. The win earned Team Kaufman $8,000, who won eight straight games at the event after losing their first.

== Men's ==
=== Teams ===
Skip	Third	Second	Lead	Locale
Jason Ackerman	Andrew Foreman	Ryan Sveinbjornson	Curtis Horwath	(Saskatchewan) Regina
Chris Anderson	Gordon Hart	Balram Sookdeo	Garry Berthiaume	(Alberta) Rocky Mountain House
Ted Appelman	Tom Appelman	Brandon Klassen	Brendan Melnyk	(Alberta) Edmonton
Curtis Bale	Michael Hauer	Dylan Webster	Craig Bourgonje	(Alberta) Calgary
Brent Bawel	Sean O'Connor	Mike Jantzen	Hardi Sulimma	(Alberta) Calgary
Scott Bitz	Mark Lang	Aryn Schmidt	Dean Hicke	(Saskatchewan) Regina
Randy Bryden	Troy Robinson	Trent Knapp	Kelly Knapp	(Saskatchewan) Regina
Jim Bush	Vance Elder	Darren Grierson	Patrick Galbraith	(Alberta) Calgary
Warren Cross	Kris Watkins	Jeremy Hodges	Matt Willerton	(Alberta) Edmonton
Scott Cruickshank	Chad Watt	Shaun Planaden	Kyle Iversen	(Alberta) Medicine Hat
Carl deConinck Smith	Jeff Sharp	Chris Haichert	Jesse St. John	(Saskatchewan) Rosetown
Andrey Drozdov	Alexey Stukalsky	Artem Bolduzev	Aleksandr Kirikov	(Russia) Moscow
Scott Egger	Albert Gerdung	Terry Morishita	Robin Niebergall	(Alberta) Brooks
Warren Hassall	Jamie King	Scott Manners	Chris Hassall	(Alberta) Lloydminster
Lloyd Heller	Brad MacInnes	Charles Funk		(Alberta) Medicine Hat
Mark Johnson	Marvin Wirth	Ken McLean	Millard Evans	(Alberta) Edmonton
Joel Jordison	Jason Jacobson	Josh Heidt	Brock Montgomery	(Saskatchewan) Moose Jaw
Brad Law	Scott Comfort	Dave Kidby	Dustin Kidby	(Saskatchewan) Regina
Lloyd Hill (fourth)	Steve Mackey (skip)	Moe Sonies	Chris Hanson	(Alberta) Calgary
Rick McKague	Rollie Robinson	Jim Moats	Paul Strandlund	(Alberta) Edmonton
Leon Moch	Delvin Moch	Kevin Aberle	Donny Zahn	(Alberta) Medicine Hat
Yusuke Morozumi	Tsuyoshi Yamaguchi	Tetsuro Shimizu	Kosuke Morozumi	(Japan) Karuizawa
Darren Moulding	Dave Manser	Steve Andrews	Jeff Davidson	(Alberta) Lethbridge
Steve Petryk	Dan Petryk	Kevin Yablonski	Brad Chyz	(Alberta) Calgary
Dean Ross	Don DeLair	Chris Blackwell	Sean Morris	(Alberta) Calgary
Robert Schlender	Chris Lemishka	Jessie Wilkinson	Darcy Hafso	(Alberta) Edmonton
Pat Simmons	Steve Laycock	Brennen Jones	Dallan Muyres	(Saskatchewan) Regina
Aaron Sluchinski	Justin Sluchinski	Joe Vrolson	David Sluchinski	(Alberta) Airdrie
Brendan Taylor	Scott Ramsay	Mark Taylor	Nathan Bodnarchuk	(Manitoba) Brandon
Don Walchuk	Chris Schille	D.J. Kidby	Don Bartlett	(Alberta) Edmonton
Wade White	Kevin Tym	Dan Holowaychuk	George White	(Alberta) Edmonton

=== Playoffs ===
Quarterfinals
(Saskatchewan) Bryden	3
(Saskatchewan) Simmons	5
(Saskatchewan) Jordison	6
(Alberta) McKague	7
(Alberta) Johnson	5
(Alberta) Egger	8
(Alberta) Appelman	5
(Alberta) White	3

Semifinals
(Saskatchewan) Simmons	7
(Alberta) McKague	6
(Alberta) Egger	0
(Alberta) Appelman	9

Final
(Saskatchewan) Simmons	5
(Alberta) Appelman	4

== Women's ==
=== Teams ===
Skip	Third	Second	Lead	Locale
Jerri Pat Armstrong-Smith	Tracey Amy	Susan Hicks	Lynn Lee	(British Columbia) Cranbrook
Brett Barber	Jen Antoshkiw	Kailena Bay	Krista White	Saskatchewan
Nicole Blenkin	Sandi Weber	Kristina Hadden	Mandy Seinen	(Alberta) Calgary
June Campbell	Shannon Nimmo	Sheri Pickering	Donna Phillips	(Alberta) Calgary
Nadine Chyz	Rebecca Pattison	Jessie Scheidigger	Kimberly Anderson	(Alberta) Calgary
Michelle Corbeil	Dawn Corbeil	Kristina Regnier	Lorena Ellsworth	(Alberta) Lloydminster
Tanilla Doyle	Lindsay Amudsen	Janice Bailey	Christina Faulkner	(Alberta) Calgary
Lisa Eyamie	Jodi Marthaller	Raegen Wilkie	Kyla MacLachlan	(Alberta) Calgary
Diane Foster	Karen Morrison	Glenna Rubin	Louise Sheeran	(Alberta) Calgary
Satsuki Fujisawa	Miyo Ichikawa	Emi Shimizu	Miyuki Satoh	(Japan) Karuizawa
Patty Hersikorn	Jill Shumay	Allison Gerhardt	Shelley Madsen	(Saskatchewan) Saskatoon
Kim Ji-Sun	Lee Seul-Bee	Shin Mi Sung	Gim Un-Chi	South Korea
Lisa Johnson	Natalie Holloway	Michelle Ries	Cindy Westgard	(Alberta) Edmonton
Jessie Kaufman	Nicky Kaufman	Amanda Coderre	Stephanie Enright	(Alberta) Edmonton
Arlene Keck	Suzette Parahoniak	Betty-Ann Neil	Donna Stuber	(Alberta) Medicine Hat
Allison MacInnes	Grace MacInnes	Diane Gushulak	Jacalyn Brown	(British Columbia) Langley
Lindsay Makichuk	Cori Dunbar	Lisa Bratrud	Deena Benoit	(Alberta) Red Deer
Eve Muirhead	Kelly Wood	Lorna Vevers	Annie Laird	(Scotland) Stirling
Morgan Muise	Tara Tanchak	Sarah Horne	Andrea Blackwell	(Alberta) Calgary
Anna Ohmiya	Shinobu Aota	Mayo Yamaura	Kotomi Ishizaki	(Japan) Aomori
Liudmila Privivkova	Nkeiruka Ezekh	Margarita Fomina	Ekaterina Galkina	Russia
Casey Scheidegger	Allison Nimik	Jody Keim	Lace Dupont	(Alberta) Lethbridge
Anna Sidorova	Olga Zyablikova	Ekaterina Antonova	Galina Arsenkina	(Russia) Moscow
Vicki Sjolie	Holly Stroh	Judy Pendergast	Sandy Bell	(Alberta) Medicine Hat
Shana Snell	Heather Armstrong	Michele Smith	Alanna Blackwell	(Alberta) Calgary
Valerie Sweeting	Leslie Rogers	Megan Einarson	Whitney More	(Alberta) Edmonton
Jill Thurston	Kristen Phillips	Jenna Loder	Kendra Georges	(Manitoba) Winnipeg
Crystal Webster	Lori Olson-Johns	Joanne Taylor	Samantha Preston	(Alberta) Calgary
Amanda White	Joelle Horn	Tara Tanchak	Lisa Moerike	(Alberta) Calgary
Tiffany Odegard (fourth)	Faye White (skip)	Jennifer Van Wieren	Heather Kushnir	(Alberta) Edmonton
Holly Whyte	Carmen Barrack	Brittany Morgan	Heather Steele	(Alberta) Edmonton
Samantha Yachiw	Cathy Inglis	Colleen Ackerman	Sarah Slywka	(Saskatchewan) Regina

=== Playoffs ===
Quarterfinals
(Scotland) Muirhead	6
(South Korea) Kim	4
(Alberta) White	6
(Alberta) Whyte	4
(Manitoba) Thurston	1
(Alberta) Makichuk	8
(Alberta) Kaufman	6
(Alberta) Scheidegger	5

Semifinals
(Scotland) Muirhead	7
(Alberta) White	5
(Alberta) Makichuk	5
(Alberta) Kaufman	7

Final
(Scotland) Muirhead	3
(Alberta) Kaufman	5
