= 2011 Horizon Laser Vision Center Classic =

- Host city: Regina, Saskatchewan
- Arena: Tartan Curling Club
- Dates: September 30 – October 3
- Winner: (Saskatchewan) Scott Bitz
- Curling club: Regina, Saskatchewan
- Skip: Scott Bitz
- Third: Mark Lang
- Second: Aryn Schmidt
- Lead: Dean Hicke
- Finalist: (Saskatchewan) Mark Herbert

The 2011 Horizon Laser Vision Center Classic was held from September 30 to October 3 at the Tartan Curling Club in Regina, Saskatchewan as part of the 2011–12 World Curling Tour. The purse for the event was CAD$16,000. The event was held in a triple-knockout format.

== Teams ==
Skip	Third	Second	Lead	Locale
Scott Bitz	Mark Lang	Aryn Schmidt	Dean Hicke	Regina, Saskatchewan
Randy Bryden	Troy Robinson	Trent Knapp	Kelly Knapp	Regina, Saskatchewan
Mitch Criton		Ray Sthamann	Bob Sonder	Regina, Saskatchewan
Brent Goeres	Cirtus Horwath	Andrew Foreman	Brad Schneider	Regina, Saskatchewan
Mike Eberle	Shane Vollman	Chris Krasowski	Travis McEachern	Regina, Saskatchewan
Brad Hebert				Regina, Saskatchewan
Mark Herbert	Rob Auckland	Matt Froehlich	Travis Gansauge	Moose Jaw, Saskatchewan
Jamey Jordison	Drew Wilby	Andrew Edgar	Ryan Kun	Regina, Saskatchewan
Shawn Joyce	Gary Scheirich	Dustin Phillips	Jeremy Tipper	Saskatoon, Saskatchewan
Kevin Knutson	Lyndon Knutson	Adam Knutson	Andrew Knutson	Regina, Saskatchewan
Jason Krupski	Lyle Brown	Dean Krupski	Kelly Hollinger	Whitewood, Saskatchewan
Matt Lang	Colton Flasch	Tyler Hartung	Jayden Shwaga	Saskatoon, Saskatchewan
Brad Law	Scott Comfort	Dave Kidby	Jason Obst	Regina, Saskatchewan
Liu Rui	Xu Xiaoming	Zang Jialiang	Ba Dexin	Harbin, China
Braeden Moskowy	Kirk Muyres	D.J. Kidby	Dustin Kidby	Regina, Saskatchewan
Al Schick	William Coutts	Stuart Coutts	Dean Clark	Regina, Saskatchewan
Daniel Selke	Mat Ring	Spencer Rowe	Brandon Leippi	Regina, Saskatchewan
Garret Vey	Shawn Meyer	Sheldon Obst	Derek Dejaegher	Regina, Saskatchewan
Jeremy Hodges (fourth)	Matt Willerton (skip)	Dalen Petersen	Nevin DeMilliano	Edmonton, Alberta
Dustin Kalthoff (fourth)	Randy Woytowich (skip)	Lionel Holm	Lyndon Holm	Saskatoon, Saskatchewan

== Knockout results ==
=== A event ===
First Knockout		Semifinals		Qualifier 1
(Saskatchewan) Scott Bitz	W
(Alberta) Matt Willerton	L	(Saskatchewan) Scott Bitz	5
(Saskatchewan) Brent Goeres	4	(Saskatchewan) Brent Goeres	1
(Saskatchewan) Mark Herbert	2			(Saskatchewan) Scott Bitz	4
(Saskatchewan) Al Schick	5			(Saskatchewan) Jason Krupski	3
(Saskatchewan) Brad Hebert	0	(Saskatchewan) Al Schick	4
(Saskatchewan) Jason Krupski	5	(Saskatchewan) Jason Krupski	6
(Saskatchewan) Braeden Moskowy	4

First Knockout
(China) Liu Rui	7
(Saskatchewan) Daniel Selke	1
(Saskatchewan) Jamey Jordison	2
(Saskatchewan) Randy Woytowich	7
(Saskatchewan) Kevin Knutson	6
(Saskatchewan) Brad Law	7
(Saskatchewan) Mitch Criton	4
(Saskatchewan) Mark Lang	5

Quarterfinals
(China) Liu Rui	5
(Saskatchewan) Randy Woytowich	7
(Saskatchewan) Brad Law	4
(Saskatchewan) Mark Lang	9
(Saskatchewan) Randy Bryden	7
(Saskatchewan) Garret Vey	6
(Saskatchewan) Mike Eberle	1
(Saskatchewan) Shawn Joyce	7

Semifinals
(Saskatchewan) Randy Woytowich	1
(Saskatchewan) Mark Lang	6
(Saskatchewan) Randy Bryden	4
(Saskatchewan) Shawn Joyce	7

Qualifier 2
(Saskatchewan) Mark Lang	5
(Saskatchewan) Shawn Joyce	3

=== B event ===
Second Knockout
(Saskatchewan) Garret Vey	4
(Saskatchewan) Mike Eberle	8
(Saskatchewan) Daniel Selke	8
(Saskatchewan) Jamey Jordison	1

Quarterfinals
(Saskatchewan) Mike Eberle	5
(Saskatchewan) Brad Law	7
(Saskatchewan) Daniel Selke	1
(Saskatchewan) Randy Bryden	7

Semifinals
(Saskatchewan) Brad Law	8
(Saskatchewan) Jason Krupski	5
(Saskatchewan) Randy Bryden	6
(Saskatchewan) Randy Woytowich	3

Qualifier 3
(Saskatchewan) Brad Law	2
(Saskatchewan) Randy Bryden	6

Second Knockout
(Saskatchewan) Kevin Knutson	3
(Saskatchewan) Mitch Criton	6
(Alberta) Matt Willerton	2
(Saskatchewan) Mark Herbert	5

Quarterfinals
(Saskatchewan) Mitch Criton	6
(China) Liu Rui	0
(Saskatchewan) Mark Herbert	3
(Saskatchewan) Al Schick	5
(Saskatchewan) Braeden Moskowy	5
(Saskatchewan) Brent Goeres	3

Semifinals
(China) Liu Rui	3
(Saskatchewan) Al Schick	7
(Saskatchewan) Braeden Moskowy	7
(Saskatchewan) Shawn Joyce	3

Qualifier 4
(Saskatchewan) Al Schick	6
(Saskatchewan) Braeden Moskowy	0

=== C event ===
Third Knockout		Qualifier 5
(Alberta) Matt Willerton	6
(Saskatchewan) Jamey Jordison	5	(Alberta) Matt Willerton	0
		(Saskatchewan) Braeden Moskowy	7

Third Knockout		Qualifier 6
(Saskatchewan) Mitch Criton	0
(Saskatchewan) Randy Woytowich	7	(Saskatchewan) Randy Woytowich	L
(Saskatchewan) Mark Herbert	3	(Saskatchewan) Mark Herbert	W
(Saskatchewan) Jason Krupski	2

Third Knockout		Qualifier 7
(Saskatchewan) Mike Eberle	L
(Saskatchewan) Shawn Joyce	W	(Saskatchewan) Shawn Joyce	6
(Saskatchewan) Daniel Selke	3	(China) Liu Rui	2
(China) Liu Rui	7

Third Knockout		Semifinals		Qualifier 8
		(Saskatchewan) Garret Vey	4
(Saskatchewan) Garret Vey	6	(Saskatchewan) Brent Goeres	5
(Saskatchewan) Kevin Knutson	3			(Saskatchewan) Brent Goeres	7
				(Saskatchewan) Brad Law	6

== Playoffs ==
Quarterfinals
(Saskatchewan) Scott Bitz	6
(Saskatchewan) Shawn Joyce	4
(Saskatchewan) Al Schick	7
(Saskatchewan) Brent Goeres	1
(Saskatchewan) Matt Lang	3
(Saskatchewan) Mark Herbert	7
(Saskatchewan) Randy Bryden	4
(Saskatchewan) Braeden Moskowy	6

Semifinals
(Saskatchewan) Scott Bitz	5
(Saskatchewan) Al Schick	1
(Saskatchewan) Mark Herbert	6
(Saskatchewan) Braeden Moskowy	3

Final
(Saskatchewan) Scott Bitz	7
(Saskatchewan) Mark Herbert	2
