= 2012 Meyers Norris Penny Charity Classic =

- Host city: Medicine Hat, Alberta
- Arena: Medicine Hat Curling Club
- Dates: October 12–15
- Men's winner: (Alberta) David Nedohin
- Skip: David Nedohin
- Third: Colin Hodgson
- Second: Mike Westlund
- Lead: Tom Sallows
- Finalist: (Saskatchewan) Randy Bryden
- Women's winner: (Saskatchewan) Chantelle Eberle
- Skip: Chantelle Eberle
- Third: Nancy Inglis
- Second: Debbie Lozinski
- Lead: Susan Hoffart
- Finalist: (Alberta) Lisa Eyamie

The 2012 Meyers Norris Penny Charity Classic was held from October 12 to 15 at the Medicine Hat Curling Club in Medicine Hat, Alberta as part of the 2012–13 World Curling Tour. The event was held in a triple knockout format. The purse for the men's event is CAD$37,000, and the winner, David Nedohin, received CAD$10,000. The purse for the women's event was CAD$30,000, and the winner, Lisa Eyamie, received CAD$8,000. Nedohin defeated Randy Bryden of Saskatchewan in the men's final with a score of 5–4, while Eberle defeated Lisa Eyamie in the women's final with a score of 7–2.

== Men ==
=== Teams ===
The teams are listed as follows:

Skip	Third	Second	Lead	Locale
Tom Appelman	Brent Bawel	Ted Appelman	Brendan Melnyk	Edmonton, Alberta
Scott Bitz	Jeff Sharp	Aryn Schmidt	Dean Hicke	Regina, Saskatchewan
Matthew Blandford	Evan Asmussen	Brent Hamilton	Brad Chyz	Calgary, Alberta
Brendan Bottcher	Micky Lizmore	Bradley Thiessen	Karrick Martin	Edmonton, Alberta
Derek Bowyer	Denton Koch	Colton Koch	Josh Bowyer	Medicine Hat, Alberta
Randy Bryden	Troy Robinson	Brennen Jones	Trent Knapp	Regina, Saskatchewan
Chad Dahlseide	James Wenzel	Jamie Chisholm	Rob Lane	Calgary, Alberta
Scott Egger	Albert Gerdung	Darren Grierson	Robin Niebergall	Brooks, Alberta
Drew Heidt		Regis Neumeier	Shayne Hannon	Kindersley, Saskatchewan
Josh Heidt	Brock Montgomery	Matt Lang	Dustin Kidby	Kerrobert, Saskatchewan
Don DeLair (fourth)	Greg Hill (skip)	Chris Blackwell	Stephen Jensen	Airdrie, Alberta
Clint Dieno (fourth)	Jason Jacobson (skip)	Matt Froehlich	Chadd McKenzie	Saskatoon, Saskatchewan
Joel Jordison	Jason Ackerman	Brent Goeres	Curtis Horwath	Moose Jaw, Saskatchewan
Glen Kennedy	Nathan Connolly	Brandon Klassen	Parker Konschuh	Edmonton, Alberta
Kim Chang-min	Kim Min-chan	Seong Se-hyeon	Seon Se-young	Uiseong, Gyeongbuk, South Korea
Sean Morris (fourth)	Mike Libbus (skip)	Brad MacInnis	Peter Keenan	Calgary, Alberta
Rick McKague	Jim Moats	Doug McNish	Paul Strandlund	Edmonton, Alberta
Leon Moch	Delvin Moch	Kyle Wagner	Greg Sjolie	Medicine Hat, Alberta
Darren Moulding	Scott Cruickshank	Shaun Planaden	Kyle Iverson	Calgary, Alberta
David Nedohin	Colin Hodgson	Mike Westlund	Tom Sallows	Edmonton, Alberta
Sean O'Connor	Rob Johnson	Ryan O'Connor	Dan Bubola	Calgary, Alberta
Justin Sluchinski	Aaron Sluchinski	Dylan Webster	Craig Bourgonje	Airdrie, Alberta
Jordan Steinke	Jason Ginter	Tristan Steinke	Brett Winfield	Dawson Creek, British Columbia
Brock Virtue	Braeden Moskowy	Chris Schille	D. J Kidby	Regina, Saskatchewan
Wade White	Kevin Tym	Dan Holowaychuk	George White	Edmonton, Alberta
Kevin Yablonski	Vance Elder	Harrison Boss	Matthew McDonald	Calgary, Alberta

=== Knockout results ===
The draw is listed as follows:

==== A event ====
First Knockout
(Alberta) Chad Dahlseide	5
(Alberta) Glen Kennedy	7
(South Korea) Kim Chang-min	9
(Alberta) Greg Hill	4
(Saskatchewan) Jason Jacobson	6
(Alberta) Scott Egger	4
(Saskatchewan) Randy Bryden	5
(Alberta) Justin Sluchinskii	3
(Alberta) Mike Libbus	10
(Saskatchewan) Drew Heidt	1

Quarterfinals
(Alberta) Tom Appelman	5
(Alberta) Glen Kennedy	6
(Saskatchewan) Joel Jordison	1
(South Korea) Kim Chang-min	7
(Saskatchewan) Jason Jacobson	6
(Saskatchewan) Randy Bryden	2
(Alberta) Mike Libbus	4
(Saskatchewan) Scott Bitz	5

Semifinals
(Alberta) Glen Kennedy	5
(South Korea) Kim Chang-min	2
(Saskatchewan) Jason Jacobson	7
(Saskatchewan) Scott Bitz	8

Qualifier 1
(Alberta) Glen Kennedy	5
(Saskatchewan) Scott Bitz	3

First Knockout
(Alberta) Matthew Blandford	8
(Alberta) Rick McKague	4
(Alberta) Darren Moulding	5
(Alberta) Leon Moch	4
(Alberta) Derek Bowyer	3
(Alberta) Sean O'Connor	6
(Alberta) Wade White	8
(Alberta) Kevin Yablonski	2
(British Columbia) Jordan Steinke	5
(Saskatchewan) Josh Heidt	7

Quarterfinals
(Alberta) David Nedohin	2
(Alberta) Matthew Blandford	8
(Alberta) Brendan Bottcher	4
(Alberta) Darren Moulding	3
(Alberta) Sean O'Connor	3
(Alberta) Wade White	6
(Saskatchewan) Josh Heidt	6
(Saskatchewan) Brock Virtue	2

Semifinals
(Alberta) Matthew Blandford	2
(Alberta) Brendan Bottcher	7
(Alberta) Wade White	6
(Saskatchewan) Josh Heidt	3

Qualifier 2
(Alberta) Brendan Bottcher	6
(Alberta) Wade White	4

==== B event ====
Second Knockout
(Saskatchewan) Randy Bryden	10
(Alberta) Chad Dahlseide	3
(Alberta) Mike Libbus	4
(Alberta) Greg Hill	3

Semifinals
(Saskatchewan) Randy Bryden	7
(Alberta) Matthew Blandford	6
(Alberta) Mike Libbus	5
(Saskatchewan) Josh Heidt	8

To Qualifier 3
(Saskatchewan) Randy Bryden	6
(Saskatchewan) Josh Heidt	1

Second Knockout
(Alberta) Scott Egger	6
(Alberta) Justin Sluchinski	7

Quarterfinals
(Alberta) Tom Appelman	3
(Alberta) Justin Sluchinski	8
(Saskatchewan) Joel Jordison	7
(Saskatchewan) Drew Heidt	2

Semifinals
(Alberta) Justin Sluchinski	6
(Saskatchewan) Joel Jordison	5

To Qualifier 3
(Alberta) Justin Sluchinski	4
(Saskatchewan) Scott Bitz	6
Qualifier 3
(Saskatchewan) Randy Bryden	1
(Saskatchewan) Scott Bitz	3

Second Knockout
(Alberta) Sean O'Connor	6
(Alberta) Rick McKague	0
(Saskatchewan) Brock Virtue	5
(Alberta) Leon Moch	3

Semifinals
(Alberta) Sean O'Connor	2
(South Korea) Kim Chang-min	8
(Saskatchewan) Brock Virtue	5
(Saskatchewan) Jason Jacobson	6

To Qualifier 4
(South Korea) Kim Chang-min	7
(Saskatchewan) Jason Jacobson	9

Second Knockout
(Alberta) Derek Bowyer	3
(Alberta) Kevin Yablonski	8

Quarterfinals
(Alberta) David Nedohin	3
(Alberta) Kevin Yablonski	6
(Alberta) Darren Moulding	4
(British Columbia) Jordan Steinke	3

Semifinals
(Alberta) Kevin Yablonski	6
(Alberta) Darren Moulding	8

To Qualifier 4
(Alberta) Darren Moulding	1
(Alberta) Wade White	7
Qualifier 4
(Saskatchewan) Jason Jacobson	5
(Alberta) Wade White	8

==== C event ====
Third Knockout		Semifinals		Qualifier 5
(Alberta) Scott Egger	6
(Alberta) Derek Bowyer	5	(Alberta) Scott Egger	5
(Alberta) Kevin Yablonski	1	(Alberta) Leon Moch	6
(Alberta) Leon Moch	7			(Alberta) Leon Moch	5
				(Saskatchewan) Jason Jacobson	6

Third Knockout
(Alberta) David Nedohin	10
(British Columbia) Jordan Steinke	5
(Saskatchewan) Brock Virtue	7
(Alberta) Chad Dahlseide	6

Semifinals
(Alberta) David Nedohin	9
(Alberta) Justin Sluchinski	5
(Saskatchewan) Brock Virtue	6
(Saskatchewan) Josh Heidt	2

Qualifier 6
(Alberta) David Nedohin	5
(Saskatchewan) Brock Virtue	4

Third Knockout
(Alberta) Mike Libbus	5
(Alberta) Rick McKague	6
(Alberta) Tom Appelman	5
(Saskatchewan) Drew Heidt	2

Semifinals
(Alberta) Rick McKague	8
(Alberta) Darren Moulding	0
(Alberta) 'Tom Appelman	5
(South Korea) Kim Chang-min	2

Qualifier 7
(Alberta) Rick McKague	8
(Alberta) Tom Appelman	1

Third Knockout		Semifinals		Qualifier 8
(Saskatchewan) Joel Jordison	4
(Alberta) Greg Hill	6	(Alberta) Greg Hill	3
(Alberta) Matthew Blandford	9	(Alberta) Matthew Blandford	9
(Alberta) Sean O'Connor	6			(Alberta) Matthew Blandford	3
				(Saskatchewan) Randy Bryden	6

=== Playoffs ===
Quarterfinals
(Alberta) Glen Kennedy	5
(Saskatchewan) Jason Jacobson	7
(Alberta) Wade White	1
(Alberta) David Nedohin	7
(Alberta) Brendan Bottcher	4
(Saskatchewan) Randy Bryden	5
(Saskatchewan) Scott Bitz	6
(Alberta) Rick McKague	5

Semifinals
(Saskatchewan) Jason Jacobson	5
(Alberta) David Nedohin	6
(Saskatchewan) Randy Bryden	7
(Saskatchewan) Scott Bitz	5

Final
(Alberta) David Nedohin	5
(Saskatchewan) Randy Bryden	4

== Women ==
=== Teams ===
The teams are listed as follows:

Skip	Third	Second	Lead	Locale
Brett Barber	Robyn Silvernagle	Kailena Bay	Dayna Demmans	Regina, Saskatchewan
Penny Barker	Susan Lang	Melissa Hoffman	Danielle Sicinski	Moose Jaw, Saskatchewan
Cheryl Bernard	Susan O'Connor	Lori Olson-Johns	Shannon Aleksic	Calgary, Alberta
Deanna Doig	Kim Schneider	Colleen Ackerman	Michelle McIvor	Kronau, Saskatchewan
Tanilla Doyle	Joelle Horn	Lindsay Amundsen-Meyer	Christina Faulkner	Edmonton, Alberta
Chantelle Eberle	Nancy Inglis	Debbie Lozinski	Susan Hoffart	Regina, Saskatchewan
Lisa Eyamie	Maria Bushell	Jodi Marthaller	Valerie Hamende	High River, Alberta
Diane Foster	Judy Pendergast	Terri Loblaw	Sue Fulkerth	Calgary, Alberta
Tammy Foster	Suzette Parahoniak	Nicole Stroh		Medicine Hat, Alberta
Teryn Hamilton	Holly Scott	Logan Conway	Karen Vanthuyne	Calgary, Alberta
Heather Jensen	Shana Snell	Heather Rogers	Carly Quigley	Airdrie, Alberta
Jiang Yilun	Wang Rui	Yaoi Mingyue	She Quitong	Harbin, China
Lisa Johnson	Michelle Kryzalka	Natalie Holloway	Shawna Nordstrom	Spruce Grove, Alberta
Kim Eun-jung	Kim Gyeong-ae	Kim Seon-yeong	Kim Yeong-mi	Gyeongbuk, South Korea
Shannon Kleibrink	Bronwen Webster	Kalynn Park	Chelsey Matson	Calgary, Alberta
Lindsay Makichuk	Amy Janko	Jessica Monk	Kristina Hadden	Edmonton, Alberta
Chana Martineau	Pam Appleman	Brittany Zelmer	Jennifer Sheehan	Edmonton, Alberta
Amy Nixon	Nadine Chyz	Whitney Eckstrand	Tracy Bush	Calgary/Red Deer, Alberta
Ayumi Ogasawara	Yumie Funayama	Kaho Onodera	Michiko Tomabechi	Sapporo, Japan
Trish Paulsen	Kari Kennedy	Sarah Collins	Kari Paulsen	Saskatoon, Saskatchewan
Jennifer Schab	Sheri Pickering	Jody Kiem	Heather Hansen	Calgary, Alberta
Casey Scheidegger	Michele Smith	Jessie Scheidegger	Kimberly Anderson	Lethbridge, Alberta
Kim Ji-sun	Lee Seul-bee	Shin Mi-sung	Gim Un-chi	South Korea
Iveta Staša-Šaršūne	Ieva Krusta	Zanda Bikše	Dace Munča	Jelgava, Latvia
Tiffany Steuber	Megan Anderson	Lisa Miller	Cindy Westgard	Edmonton, Alberta
Wang Bingyu	Liu Yin	Yue Qingshuang	Zhou Yan	Harbin, China
Holly Whyte	Heather Steele	Cori Dunbar	Jamie Forth	Edmonton, Alberta
Kelly Wood	Teejay Haichert	Kelsey Dutton	Janelle Tyler	Swift Current, Saskatchewan

=== Knockout results ===
The draw is listed as follows:

==== A event ====
First Knockout
(Latvia) Iveta Staša-Šaršūne	7
(Alberta) Teryn Hamilton	3
(Alberta) Lisa Eyamie	3
(South Korea) Kim Ji-sun	6
(Saskatchewan) Brett Barber	5
(Alberta) Lisa Johnson	6
(Saskatchewan) Deanna Doig	9
(Saskatchewan) Kelly Wood	3
(Alberta) Tiffany Game	5
(Alberta) Tanilla Doyle	4
(Alberta) Lindsay Makichuk	6
(Alberta) Diane Foster	7

Quarterfinals
(Alberta) Cheryl Bernard	6
(Latvia) Iveta Staša-Šaršūne	4
(South Korea) Kim Ji-sun	5
(Alberta) Lisa Johnson	4
(Saskatchewan) Deanna Doig	5
(Alberta) Tiffany Game	4
(Alberta) Diane Foster	7
(China) Wang Bingyu	4

Semifinals
(Alberta) Cheryl Bernard	6
(South Korea) Kim Ji-sun	4
(Saskatchewan) Deanna Doig	5
(Alberta) Diane Foster	3

Qualifier 1
(Alberta) Cheryl Bernard	7
(Saskatchewan) Deanna Doig	5

First Knockout
(South Korea) Kim Eun-jung	3
(Alberta) Holly Whyte	4
(Saskatchewan) Penny Barker	9
(China) Jiang Yilun	8
(Alberta) Heather Jensen	4
(Alberta) Jennifer Schab	9
(Saskatchewan) Trish Paulsen	7
(Alberta) Chana Martineau	1
(Saskatchewan) Chantelle Eberle	7
(Japan) Ayumi Ogasawara	6
(Alberta) Casey Scheidegger	8
(Alberta) Tammy Foster	3

Quarterfinals
(Alberta) Shannon Kleibrink	5
(Alberta) Holly Whyte	7
(Saskatchewan) Penny Barker	6
(Alberta) Jennifer Schab	4
(Saskatchewan) Trish Paulsen	4
(Saskatchewan) Chantelle Eberle	5
(Alberta) Casey Scheidegger	6
(Alberta) Amy Nixon	7

Semifinals
(Alberta) Holly Whyte	7'
(Saskatchewan) Penny Barker	3
(Saskatchewan) Chantelle Eberle	2
(Alberta) Amy Nixon	7

Qualifier 2
(Alberta) Holly Whyte	5
(Alberta) Amy Nixon	8

==== B event ====
Second Knockout
(Saskatchewan) Brett Barber	6
(Alberta) Lisa Eyamie	5

Quarterfinals
(Alberta) Tiffany Game	6
(Alberta) Teryn Hamilton	5
(China) Wang Bingyu	8
(Saskatchewan) Brett Barber	7

Semifinals
(Alberta) Tiffany Game	7
(Saskatchewan) Penny Barker	6
(China) Wang Bingyu	7
(Saskatchewan) Chantelle Eberle	1

To Qualifier 3
(Alberta) Tiffany Game	5
(China) Wang Bingyu	7

Second Knockout
(Saskatchewan) Kelly Wood	5
(Alberta) Tanilla Doyle	6

Quarterfinals
(Latvia) Iveta Staša-Šaršūne
(Alberta) Tanilla Doyle	8
(Alberta) Lisa Johnson	1
(Alberta) Lindsay Makichuk	6

Semifinals
(Alberta) Tanilla Doyle	4
(Alberta) Lindsay Makichuk	5

To Qualifier 3
(Alberta) Lindsay Makichuk	8
(Saskatchewan) Deanna Doig	2
Qualifier 3
(China) Wang Bingyu	7
(Alberta) Lindsay Makichuk	2

Second Knockout
(China) Jiang Yilun	3
(Alberta) Heather Jensen	6

Quarterfinals
(Saskatchewan) Trish Paulsen	3
(South Korea) Kim Eun-jung	6
(Alberta) Casey Scheidegger	6
(Alberta) Heather Jensen	1

Semifinals
(South Korea) Kim Eun-jung	9
(South Korea) Kim Ji-sun	4
(Alberta) Casey Scheidegger	10
(Alberta) Diane Foster	2

To Qualifier 4
(South Korea) Kim Eun-jung	9
(Alberta) Casey Scheidegger	4

Second Knockout
(Alberta) Chana Martineau	6
(Japan) Ayumi Ogasawara	5

Quarterfinals
(Alberta) Shannon Kleibrink	6
(Alberta) Chana Martineau	4
(Alberta) Jennifer Schab	9
(Alberta) Tammy Foster	1

Semifinals
(Alberta) Shannon Kleibrink	6
(Alberta) Jennifer Schab	5

To Qualifier 4
(Alberta) Shannon Kleibrink	6
(Alberta) Holly Whyte	5
Qualifier 4
(South Korea) Kim Eun-jung	6
(Alberta) Shannon Kleibrink	4

==== C event ====
Third Knockout
(Saskatchewan) Kelly Wood	5
(Alberta) Lisa Eyamie	6

Quarterfinals
(South Korea) Kim Ji-sun	6
(Alberta) Lisa Eyamie	7
(Alberta) Jennifer Schab	2
(Alberta) Heather Jensen	6

Semifinals
(Alberta) Lisa Eyamie	8
(Alberta) Heather Jensen	5

Qualifier 5
(Alberta) Lisa Eyamie	6
(Alberta) Shannon Kleibrink	4

Third Knockout
(Alberta) Chana Martineau	12
(Alberta) Tammy Foster	6
(Alberta) Diane Foster	3
(Alberta) Teryn Hamilton	5

Semifinals
(Alberta) Chana Martineau	1
(Saskatchewan) Deanna Doig	7
(Alberta) Teryn Hamilton	2
(Alberta) Tiffany Game	8

Qualifier 6
(Saskatchewan) Deanna Doig	4
(Alberta) Tiffany Game	8

Third Knockout
(Saskatchewan) Chantelle Eberle	6
(Saskatchewan) Trish Paulsen	1
(Latvia) Iveta Staša-Šaršūne	4
(Alberta) Lisa Johnson	6

Semifinals
(Saskatchewan) Chantelle Eberle	9
(Alberta) Holly Whyte	2
(Alberta) Lisa Johnson	2
(Alberta) Casey Scheidegger	7

Qualifier 7
(Saskatchewan) Chantelle Eberle	6
(Alberta) Casey Scheidegger	5

Third Knockout
(Japan) Ayumi Ogasawara	7
(China) Jiang Yilun	6

Quarterfinals
(Alberta) Tanilla Doyle	5
(Saskatchewan) Brett Barber	7
(Saskatchewan) Penny Barker	2
(Japan) Ayumi Ogasawara	7

Semifinals
(Saskatchewan) Brett Barber	4
(Japan) Ayumi Ogasawara	7

Qualifier 8
(Japan) Ayumi Ogasawara	8
(Alberta) Lindsay Makichuk	3

=== Playoffs ===
Quarterfinals
(Alberta) Cheryl Bernard	6
(Alberta) Lisa Eyamie	8
(South Korea) Kim Eun-jung	4
(Alberta) Tiffany Game	5
(Alberta) Amy Nixon	6
(Japan) Ayumi Ogasawara	4
(China) Wang Bingyu	5
(Saskatchewan) Chantelle Eberle	6

Semifinals
(Alberta) Lisa Eyamie	7
(Alberta) Tiffany Game	6
(Alberta) Amy Nixon	4
(Saskatchewan) Chantelle Eberle	5

Final
(Alberta) Lisa Eyamie	2
(Saskatchewan) Chantelle Eberle	7
