= Dauphin Clinic Pharmacy Classic =

Curling tournament

The Dauphin Clinic Pharmacy Classic was an annual bonspiel, or curling tournament, that took place at the Dauphin Curling Club in Dauphin, Manitoba. The tournament was held in a triple-knockout format. The tournament was part of the World Curling Tour. Curlers from Manitoba dominated the event.

== Past champions ==
Only skip's name is displayed.

Year	Winning team	Runner up team	Purse (CAD)
2000	(Manitoba) Brian White		
2001	(Manitoba) Cam Thompson	(Manitoba) Kyle Werenich	
2002	(Manitoba) Murray Woodward	(Manitoba) Mark Lukowich	
2003	(Manitoba) James Kirkness	(Manitoba) Graham Freeman	
2004	(Saskatchewan) Maurel Erick	(Manitoba) Ryan Fry	$28,000
2005	(Manitoba) Ryan Fry	(Manitoba) Peter Prokopowich	$30,000
2006	(Manitoba) Peter Prokopowich	(Manitoba) Kelly Skinner	$30,000
2007	(Manitoba) Chris Galbraith	(Manitoba) Reid Carruthers	
2008	(Manitoba) Brendan Taylor	(Manitoba) Terry McNamee	$30,000
2009	(Manitoba) David Hamblin	(Manitoba) Travis Graham	$30,000
2010	(Manitoba) Rae Kujanpaa	(Saskatchewan) Brent Gedak	$30,000
2011	(Saskatchewan) Brent Gedak	(Manitoba) Chris Galbraith	$30,000
2012	(Saskatchewan) Randy Bryden	(Saskatchewan) Scott Bitz	$32,000
2013	(Saskatchewan) Scott Bitz	(Manitoba) David Kraichy	$32,000
2014	(Saskatchewan) Randy Bryden	(Manitoba) Scott Ramsay	$32,000
