= Medicine Hat Charity Classic =

World Curling Tour event

Location in Canada

The Medicine Hat Charity Classic was an annual bonspiel on the men's and women's World Curling Tour. It was held every October at the Medicine Hat Curling Club in Medicine Hat, Alberta. The event has not been held since 2019.

== Event names ==
- Medicine Hat Super 8 Motel Charity Classic (1997)
- Medicine Hat Super 8 Charity Classic (1998–2001)
- Jackson Dodge Charity Classic (2002)
- Meyers Norris Penny Charity Classic (2003–2012)

== Past champions ==
=== Men ===
Year	Winning skip	Runner up skip	Purse (CAD)
1997	(Manitoba) Chad McMullan	(Saskatchewan) Brian Humble	$33,000
1998	(Alberta) Frank Morissette	(Alberta) Brian Costain	
1999	(Alberta) Lowell Peterman	(Alberta) Ken Hunka	
2000	(Sweden) Peja Lindholm	(Saskatchewan) Bryan Derbowka	$33,000
2001	(Saskatchewan) Brian Humble	(Alberta) Leon Moch	$33,600
2002	(Saskatchewan) Brian Humble	(Saskatchewan) Brad Heidt	$34,000
2003	(Alberta) Rob Johnson	(Alberta) Greg Northcott	$34,000
2004	(Saskatchewan) Pat Simmons	(Alberta) Mickey Pendergast	$36,400
2005	(Alberta) John Morris	(Saskatchewan) Randy Bryden	$36,400
2006	(Saskatchewan) Joel Jordison	(Alberta) Adrian Bakker	$36,400
2007	(Alberta) James Pahl	(Saskatchewan) Pat Simmons	$36,400
2008	(Alberta) Ted Appelman	(Saskatchewan) Randy Bryden	$37,400
2009	(Alberta) Wade White	(Alberta) Ted Appelman	$43,000
2010	(Saskatchewan) Pat Simmons	(Alberta) Ted Appelman	$43,000
2011	(Alberta) Jamie King	(Alberta) Brock Virtue	$37,000
2012	(Alberta) David Nedohin	(Saskatchewan) Randy Bryden	$37,000
2013	(Saskatchewan) Randy Bryden	(Saskatchewan) Scott Bitz	$34,000
2014	(Alberta) Sean O'Connor	(Saskatchewan) Scott Bitz	$28,000
2015	(Saskatchewan) Shaun Meachem	(Saskatchewan) Randy Bryden	$28,000
2016	(Saskatchewan) Jason Jacobson	(Alberta) Ted Appelman	$35,000
2017	(Alberta) Brendan Bottcher	(Alberta) Jamie King	$35,000
2018	(Alberta) Ted Appelman	(Saskatchewan) Kirk Muyres	$28,000
2019	(Alberta) Karsten Sturmay	(Manitoba) Jason Gunnlaugson	$35,000
2020	Cancelled		

=== Women ===
Year	Winning skip	Runner up skip	Purse (CAD)
1999	(Alberta) Vicki Sjolie	(Alberta) Bronwen Saunders	
2000	(Alberta) Jennifer Loudon	(Alberta) Sandy Turner	
2001	(Alberta) Arlene Keck	(Alberta) Andrea Wilson	
2002	(Saskatchewan) Jolene McIvor	(Switzerland) Nicole Strausak	$12,100
2003	(Alberta) Shannon Kleibrink	(Saskatchewan) June Campbell	
2004	(Saskatchewan) Stefanie Miller	(Saskatchewan) Nancy Inglis	
2005	(Alberta) Diane Foster	(Alberta) Heather Bedard	$18,700
2006	(Alberta) Cheryl Bernard	(Saskatchewan) Amber Holland	$21,200
2007	(Japan) Moe Meguro	(Alberta) Carly Quigley	$21,200
2008	(Alberta) Casey Scheidegger	(Alberta) Lisa Johnson	$22,500
2009	(Russia) Liudmila Privivkova	(Alberta) Karallee Swabb	$25,000
2010	(Alberta) Jessie Kaufman	(Scotland) Eve Muirhead	$25,000
2011	(Scotland) Eve Muirhead	(Alberta) Crystal Webster	$30,000
2012	(Saskatchewan) Chantelle Eberle	(Alberta) Lisa Eyamie	$30,000
2013	(Russia) Anna Sidorova	(Japan) Sayaka Yoshimura	$30,000
2014	(Alberta) Casey Scheidegger	(Saskatchewan) Brett Barber	$24,000
2015	(Alberta) Shannon Kleibrink	(Alberta) Casey Scheidegger	$24,000
2016	(Alberta) Casey Scheidegger	(Alberta) Nadine Chyz	$11,600
2017	(Saskatchewan) Candace Chisholm	(Saskatchewan) Penny Barker	$11,600
2018	(Saskatchewan) Kourtney Fesser	(Alberta) Jodi Marthaller	$10,100
2019	(Alberta) Kayla Skrlik	(China) Wang Meini	$24,000
2020	Cancelled		
