= Horizon Laser Vision Center Classic =

The Horizon Laser Vision Center Curling Classic was an annual bonspiel, or curling tournament, that took place at the Tartan Curling Club in Regina, Saskatchewan. The tournament, started in 2009, and was held in a round-robin format with twenty-four teams. The tournament was sponsored by the Horizon Laser Vision Center (sic), a local eye care centre. It was a part of the Canadian Team Ranking System, which dealt with qualification to the 2013 Canadian Olympic Curling Trials.

== Past champions ==
Only skip's name is displayed.

| Year | Winning team | Runner up team | Purse (CAD) |
|---|---|---|---|
| 2009 | (Saskatchewan) Pat Simmons | (Saskatchewan) Brennen Jones | unknown |
| 2010 | (Saskatchewan) Randy Bryden | (Saskatchewan) Carl deConinck Smith | $16,000 |
| 2011 | (Saskatchewan) Scott Bitz | (Saskatchewan) Mark Herbert | $16,000 |
| 2012 | (China) Zou Dejia | (Saskatchewan) Brent Gedak | $16,000 |
