= 2011 Dauphin Clinic Pharmacy Classic =

- Host city: Dauphin, Manitoba
- Arena: Parkland Recreation Complex
- Dates: December 2–5
- Winner: (Saskatchewan) Brent Gedak
- Curling club: Regina, Saskatchewan
- Skip: Brent Gedak
- Third: John Aston
- Second: Derek Owens
- Lead: Malcolm Vanstone
- Finalist: (Manitoba) Chris Galbraith

The 2011 Dauphin Clinic Pharmacy Classic was held from December 2 to 5 at the Parkland Recreation Complex in Dauphin, Manitoba as part of the 2011–12 World Curling Tour. The purse for the event was CAD$30,000, and the winner, Brent Gedak, received CAD$8,000. The event was held in a triple knockout format.

== Teams ==
Skip	Third	Second	Lead	Locale
Todd Aitken				Dauphin, Manitoba
Derek Boe	Erwin Hanley	Dean Cursons	Cory Hubick	Regina, Saskatchewan
Randy Bryden	Troy Robinson	Trent Knapp	Kelly Knapp	Regina, Saskatchewan
Jerry Chudley	Kevin Cooley	Kyle Csversko	Paul Robertson	Neepawa, Manitoba
Kyle Foster	Wes Jonasson	Shawn Magnusson	Darcy Jacobs	Arborg, Manitoba
Chris Galbraith	Travis Bale	Bryan Galbraith	Rodney Legault	Winnipeg, Manitoba
Brent Gedak	John Aston	Derek Owens	Malcolm Vanstone	Regina, Saskatchewan
Sean Grassie	Corey Chambers	Kody Janzen	Stuart Shiells	Winnipeg, Manitoba
Mark Hadway	Rob Fischer	Gord Wood	Jason Beyette	Dauphin, Manitoba
Tom Hyde	Neil Jordan	Ray Faith	Cam Scott	Portage la Prairie, Manitoba
Jared Kolomaya	Neil Kitching	Kennedy Bird	Daniel Hunt	Stonewall, Manitoba
Rae Kujanpaa				Dauphin, Manitoba
Scott Madams	Braden Zawada	Ian Fordyce	Nigel Milnes	Winnipeg, Manitoba
Kelly Marnoch	Tyler Waterhouse	Travis Brooks	Chris Cameron	Carberry, Manitoba
Terry McNamee	Steve Irwin	Geordie Hargreaves	Travis Saban	Brandon, Manitoba
Todd Montgomery				Dauphin, Manitoba
Butch Mouck				Brandon, Manitoba
Richard Muntain	Mike McCaughan	Justin Reischek	Keith Doherty	Pinawa, Manitoba
Roger Parker	Jason Yates	Jim Cooke	Ian Ferley	Dauphin, Manitoba
Dan Petryk (fourth)	Steve Petryk (skip)	Colin Hodgson	Brad Chyz	Calgary, Alberta
Scott Ramsay	Mark Taylor	Ross McFadyen	Ken Buchanan	Winnipeg, Manitoba
Kelly Robertson				Manitoba
John Shuster	Zach Jacobson	Jared Zezel	John Landsteiner	Duluth, Minnesota
Shawn Taylor	Travis Taylor	Branden Jorgenson		Brandon, Manitoba
Greg Todoruk	Dwight Bottrell	Darcy Todoruk	Mike Csversko	Dauphin, Manitoba
Jim Todoruk				Dauphin, Manitoba
Glen Toews	Nick Ogryzlo	Mike Schott	Cory Toews	Swan River, Manitoba
Rob van Kommer	Bart Witherspoon	Cale Dunbar	Ian Scott	Carberry, Manitoba
Brock Virtue	J. D. Lind	Dominic Daemen	Matthew Ng	Calgary, Alberta
Joey Witherspoon	Conner Njegovan	Taylor McIntyre	Brett Brezden	Manitoba
Cory Zdan	Jay Kinnaird	Blair Zdan	Chris Kinnaird	Winnipeg, Manitoba

== Knockout results ==
=== A event ===
First Knockout
(Manitoba) Chris Galbraith	6
(Manitoba) Mark Hadway	3
(Manitoba) Jerry Chudley	3
(Manitoba) Rob van Kommer	6
(Manitoba) Todd Aitken	2
(Manitoba) Jared Kolomaya	9
(Manitoba) Sean Grassie	8
(Manitoba) Todd Montgomery	0
(Saskatchewan) Derek Boe	8
(Manitoba) Scott Ramsay	2
(Manitoba) Jim Todoruk	4
(Manitoba) Joey Witherspoon	9
(Manitoba) Kelly Robertson	5
(Minnesota) John Shuster	6

Quarterfinals
(Manitoba) Chris Galbraith	6
(Manitoba) Rob van Kommer	5
(Manitoba) Jared Kolomaya	7
(Manitoba) Sean Grassie	5
(Saskatchewan) Derek Boe	4
(Manitoba) Joey Witherspoon	9
(Minnesota) John Shuster	5
(Alberta) Brock Virtue	8

Semifinals
(Manitoba) Chris Galbraith	9
(Manitoba) Jared Kolomaya	5
(Manitoba) Joey Witherspoon	5
(Alberta) Brock Virtue	7

Qualifier
(Manitoba) Chris Galbraith	9
(Alberta) Brock Virtue	6

First Knockout
(Manitoba) Terry McNamee	8
(Manitoba) Shawn Taylor	2
(Manitoba) Rae Kujanpaa	6
(Manitoba) Kyle Foster	4
(Manitoba) Greg Todoruk	9
(Manitoba) Glen Toews	8
(Manitoba) Roger Parker	5
(Saskatchewan) Randy Bryden	6
(Manitoba) Scott Madams	10
(Manitoba) Kelly Marnoch	5
(Manitoba) Cory Zdan	9
(Saskatchewan) Brent Gedak	6
(Manitoba) Tom Hyde	7
(Manitoba) Richard Muntain	6
(Manitoba) Butch Mouck	8
(Alberta) Steve Petryk	6

Quarterfinals
(Manitoba) Terry McNamee	2
(Manitoba) Rae Kujanpaa	6
(Manitoba) Greg Todoruk	2
(Saskatchewan) Randy Bryden	8
(Manitoba) Scott Madams	8
(Manitoba) Cory Zdan	3
(Manitoba) Tom Hyde	3
(Manitoba) Butch Mouck	9

Semifinals
(Manitoba) Rae Kujanpaa	7
(Saskatchewan) Randy Bryden	9
(Manitoba) Scott Madams	8
(Manitoba) Butch Mouck	2

Qualifier 2
(Saskatchewan) Randy Bryden	8
(Manitoba) Scott Madams	2

=== B event ===
Second Knockout
(Manitoba) Mark Hadway	1
(Manitoba) Jerry Chudley	7
(Manitoba) Todd Aitken	8
(Manitoba) Todd Montgomery	0
(Manitoba) Scott Ramsay	8
(Manitoba) Jim Todoruk	3

Quarterfinals
(Manitoba) Jerry Chudley
(Manitoba) Todd Aitken
(Manitoba) Scott Ramsay	6
(Manitoba) Kelly Robertson	9

Semifinals
(Manitoba) Jerry Chudley	5
(Manitoba) Rae Kujanpaa	6
(Manitoba) Kelly Robertson	5
(Manitoba) Butch Mouck	9

To Qualifier 3
(Manitoba) Rae Kujanpaa	6
(Manitoba) Butch Mouck	4
Qualifier 3
(Manitoba) Rae Kujanpaa	2
(Alberta) Brock Virtue	7

Second Knockout		Semifinals		To Qualifier 3
(Manitoba) Terry McNamee	1
(Manitoba) Greg Todoruk	6	(Manitoba) Greg Todoruk	8
(Manitoba) Cory Zdan	8	(Manitoba) Cory Zdan	1
(Manitoba) Tom Hyde	2			(Manitoba) Greg Todoruk	8
				(Alberta) Brock Virtue	9

Second Knockout		Semifinals		To Qualifier 4
(Manitoba) Rob van Kommer	7
(Manitoba) Sean Grassie	4	(Manitoba) Rob van Kommer	8
(Saskatchewan) Derek Boe	5	(Saskatchewan) Derek Boe	3
(Minnesota) John Shuster	0			(Manitoba) Rob van Kommer	7
				(Manitoba) Scott Madams	1

Second Knockout
(Manitoba) Shawn Taylor	11
(Manitoba) Kyle Foster	6
(Manitoba) Glen Toews	8
(Manitoba) Roger Parker	1
(Manitoba) Kelly Marnoch	2
(Saskatchewan) Brent Gedak	8
(Manitoba) Richard Muntain	4
(Alberta) Steve Petryk	8

Quarterfinals
(Manitoba) Shawn Taylor	4
(Manitoba) Glen Toews	6
(Saskatchewan) Brent Gedak	6
(Alberta) Steve Petryk	4

Semifinals
(Manitoba) Jared Koloyama	6
(Manitoba) Glen Toews	3
(Manitoba) Joey Witherspoon	6
(Saskatchewan) Brent Gedak	11

To Qualifier 4
(Manitoba) Jared Koloyama	7
(Saskatchewan) Brent Gedak	1
Qualifier 4
(Manitoba) Rob van Kommer	5
(Manitoba) Jared Koloyama	11

=== C event ===
Third Knockout
(Manitoba) Mark Hadway	8
(Manitoba) Todd Montgomery	9

Quarterfinals
(Manitoba) Terry McNamee	5
(Manitoba) Mark Hadway	4
(Manitoba) Tom Hyde	6
(Manitoba) Jim Todoruk	9

Semifinals
(Manitoba) Terry McNamee	8
(Manitoba) Jim Todoruk	3

Qualifier 5
(Manitoba) Terry McNamee	7
(Manitoba) Rae Kujanpaa	8

Third Knockout
(Manitoba) Todd Aitken	4
(Manitoba) Scott Ramsay	8

Quarterfinals
(Manitoba) Glen Toews	5
(Manitoba) Joey Witherspoon	7
(Manitoba) Cory Zdan	7
(Manitoba) Scott Ramsay	8

Semifinals
(Manitoba) Joey Witherspoon	11
(Manitoba) Butch Mouck	8
(Manitoba) Scott Ramsay	7
(Manitoba) Scott Madams	4

Qualifier 6
(Manitoba) Joey Witherspoon	8
(Manitoba) Scott Ramsay	7

Third Knockout
(Alberta) Steve Petryk	10
(Manitoba) Shawn Taylor	4

Quarterfinals
(Saskatchewan) Derek Boe	5
(Alberta) Steve Petryk	6
(Manitoba) Jerry Chudley	5
(Manitoba) Kelly Robertson	9

Semifinals
(Alberta) Steve Petryk	7
(Manitoba) Greg Todoruk	3
(Manitoba) Kelly Robertson	7
(Saskatchewan) Brent Gedak	8

Qualifier 7
(Alberta) Steve Petryk	3
(Saskatchewan) Brent Gedak	8

Third Knockout
(Manitoba) Kyle Foster	9
(Manitoba) Roger Parker	7
(Manitoba) Kelly Marnoch	4
(Manitoba) Richard Muntain	8

Quarterfinals
(Manitoba) Sean Grassie	0
(Manitoba) Kyle Foster	9
(Minnesota) John Shuster	4
(Manitoba) Richard Muntain	6

Semifinals
(Manitoba) Kyle Foster	1
(Manitoba) Richard Muntain	7

Qualifier 8
(Manitoba) Richard Muntain	5
(Manitoba) Rob van Kommer	6

== Playoffs ==
Quarterfinals
(Manitoba) Chris Galbraith	5
(Manitoba) Joey Witherspoon	2
(Manitoba) Jared Koloyama	8
(Manitoba) Rae Kujanpaa	7
(Saskatchewan) Randy Bryden	3
(Saskatchewan) Brent Gedak	5
(Alberta) Brock Virtue	2
(Manitoba) Rob van Kommer	7

Semifinals
(Manitoba) Chris Galbraith	8
(Manitoba) Jared Koloyama	6
(Saskatchewan) Brent Gedak	6
(Manitoba) Rob van Kommer	1

Finals
(Manitoba) Chris Galbraith	2
(Saskatchewan) Brent Gedak	7
