= 2012 Dauphin Clinic Pharmacy Classic =

Curling tournament

- Host city: Dauphin, Manitoba
- Arena: Dauphin Curling Club
- Dates: November 16–19
- Winner: (Saskatchewan) Randy Bryden
- Skip: Randy Bryden
- Third: Troy Robinson
- Second: Brennen Jones
- Lead: Trent Knapp
- Finalist: (Saskatchewan) Scott Bitz

The 2012 Dauphin Clinic Pharmacy Classic was held from November 16 to 19 at the Dauphin Curling Club in Dauphin, Manitoba as part of the 2012–13 World Curling Tour. The event was held in a triple knockout format, and the purse for the event was CAD$32,000, of which the winner, Randy Bryden, received CAD$10,000. Bryden defeated Scott Bitz in the final with a score of 5–3.

== Teams ==
The teams are listed as follows:

Skip	Third	Second	Lead	Locale
Sam Antila	Jonathan Sawatzky	Ian Graham	Jeff Antila	Thompson, Manitoba
Scott Bitz	Jeff Sharp	Aryn Schmidt	Dean Hicke	Regina, Saskatchewan
Dave Boehmer	William Kuran	Shawn Magnusson		Petersfield, Manitoba
Randy Bryden	Troy Robinson	Brennen Jones	Trent Knapp	Regina, Saskatchewan
Jerry Chudley	Kevin Cooley	Brent McKee	Paul Robertson	Neepawa, Manitoba
Dave Elias	Kevin Thompson	Hubert Perrin	Chris Suchy	Winnipeg, Manitoba
Kyle Foster	Wes Jonasson	Rodney Legault	Darcy Jacobs	Arborg, Manitoba
Brent Gedak	John Aston	Derek Owens	Malcolm Vanstone	Estevan, Saskatchewan
Sam Good	Connor McIntyre	Nick Good	Robbie Good	Winnipeg, Manitoba
Mark Hadway				Dauphin, Manitoba
Ryan Hyde				Portage la Prairie, Manitoba
Jared Kolomaya	Neil Katching	Kennedy Bird	Daniel Hunt	Stonewall, Manitoba
David Kraichy	Andrew Irving	Brad Van Walleghem	Curtis Atkins	Winnipeg, Manitoba
Tyler Krupski	Braydan Mohns	Jordan Gottinger	Spencer Ellis	Regina, Saskatchewan
Rae Kujanpaa				Dauphin, Manitoba
Kelly Marnoch	Evan Reynolds	Branden Jorgenson	Chris Cameron	Carberry, Manitoba
Terry Marteniuk				Yorkton, Saskatchewan
Butch Mouck				Gilbert Plains, Manitoba
Richard Muntain	Mike McCaughan		Keith Doherty	Pinawa, Manitoba
Daley Peters	Chris Galbraith	Kyle Einarson	Mike Neufeld	Winnipeg, Manitoba
Bryan Preston				Ste. Rose du Lac, Manitoba
Scott Ramsay	Mark Taylor	Ross McFayden	Kyle Werenich	Winnipeg, Manitoba
Darko Reischek	Justin Reischek	Sheldon Oshanyk	Glen Ursel	Winnipeg, Manitoba
Owen Sampson				North Dakota
Greg Todoruk				Dauphin, Manitoba
Glen Toews				Dauphin, Manitoba
Geoff Trimble	Dean Smith	Darren Pennell	Alan Christison	Gladstone, Manitoba
Neal Watkins	Grant Spicer	Dave McGarry	Kent Meyn	Swan River, Manitoba

== Knockout results ==
The draw is listed as follows:

=== A event ===
First Knockout
(Manitoba) Jared Kolomaya	6
(Saskatchewan) Tyler Krupski	4
(Manitoba) Daley Peters	8
(North Dakota) Owen Sampson	1
(Manitoba) Sam Good	1
(Saskatchewan) Scott Bitz	7
(Manitoba) Sam Antila	4
(Saskatchewan) Brent Gedak	9
(Manitoba) Mark Hadway	2
(Manitoba) Scott Madams	7

Quarterfinals
(Manitoba) Butch Mouck	0
(Manitoba) Jared Kolomaya	6
(Saskatchewan) Terry Marteniuk	7
(Manitoba) Daley Peters	5
(Saskatchewan) Scott Bitz	7
(Saskatchewan) Brent Gedak	4
(Manitoba) Scott Madams	0
(Manitoba) Dave Elias	4

Semifinals
(Manitoba) Jared Kolomaya	4
(Saskatchewan) Terry Marteniuk	3
(Saskatchewan) Scott Bitz	8
(Manitoba) Dave Elias	1

Qualifier 1
(Manitoba) Jared Kolomaya	4
(Saskatchewan) Scott Bitz	6

First Knockout
(Saskatchewan) Randy Bryden	7
(Manitoba) Neal Watkins	4
(Manitoba) Kelly Marnoch	7
(Manitoba) Dave Boehmer	5
(Manitoba) David Kraichy	3
(Manitoba) Geoff Trimble	5
(Manitoba) Ryan Hyde	4
(Manitoba) Scott Ramsay	11
(Manitoba) Glen Toews	5
(Manitoba) Kyle Foster	7
(Manitoba) Rae Kujanpaa	6
(Manitoba) Darko Reischek	5
(Manitoba) Greg Todoruk	3
(Manitoba) Richard Muntain	4
(Manitoba) Bryan Preston	8
(Manitoba) Jerry Chudley	3

Quarterfinals
(Saskatchewan) Randy Bryden	7
(Manitoba) Kelly Marnoch	3
(Manitoba) Geoff Trimble	3
(Manitoba) Scott Ramsay	5
(Manitoba) Kyle Foster	5
(Manitoba) Rae Kujanpaa	6
(Manitoba) Richard Muntain	3
(Manitoba) Bryan Preston	6

Semifinals
(Saskatchewan) Randy Bryden	6
(Manitoba) Scott Ramsay	1
(Manitoba) Rae Kujanpaa	3
(Manitoba) Bryan Preston	7

Qualifier 2
(Saskatchewan) Randy Bryden	7
(Manitoba) Bryan Preston	3

=== B event ===
Second Knockout
(Manitoba) Sam Good	3
(Manitoba) Sam Antila	8

Quarterfinals
(Saskatchewan) Tyler Krupski	7
(North Dakota) Owen Sampson	4
(Manitoba) Sam Antila	8
(Manitoba) Mark Hadway	4

Semifinals
(Saskatchewan) Tyler Krupski	3
(Manitoba) Scott Ramsay	7
(Manitoba) Sam Antila	4
(Manitoba) Rae Kujanpaa	5

To Qualifier 3
(Manitoba) Scott Ramsay	1
(Manitoba) Rae Kujanpaa	6
Qualifier 3
(Manitoba) Rae Kujanpaa	4
(Manitoba) Jared Kolomaya	7

Second Knockout		Semifinals		To Qualifier 3
(Manitoba) Kelly Marnoch	7
(Manitoba) Geoff Trimble	3	(Manitoba) Kelly Marnoch	6
(Manitoba) Kyle Foster	6	(Manitoba) Kyle Foster	5
(Manitoba) Richard Muntain	3			(Manitoba) Kelly Marnoch	1
				(Manitoba) Jared Kolomaya	6

Second Knockout		Semifinals		To Qualifier 4
(Manitoba) Butch Mouck	1
(Manitoba) Daley Peters	6	(Manitoba) Daley Peters	6
(Saskatchewan) Brent Gedak	7	(Saskatchewan) Brent Gedak	1
(Manitoba) Scott Madams	2			(Manitoba) Daley Peters	6
				(Manitoba) Bryan Preston	1

Second Knockout
(Manitoba) Neal Watkins	0
(Manitoba) Dave Boehmer	8
(Manitoba) David Kraichy	9
(Manitoba) Ryan Hyde	3
(Manitoba) Glen Toews	5
(Manitoba) Darko Reischek	4
(Manitoba) Greg Todoruk	8
(Manitoba) Jerry Chudley	9

Quarterfinals
(Manitoba) Dave Boehmer	3
(Manitoba) David Kraichy	5
(Manitoba) Glen Toews	3
(Manitoba) Jerry Chudley	5

Semifinals
(Saskatchewan) Terry Marteniuk	1
(Manitoba) David Kraichy	7
(Manitoba) Dave Elias	3
(Manitoba) Jerry Chudley	10

To Qualifier 4
(Manitoba) David Kraichy	6
(Manitoba) Jerry Chudley	1
Qualifier 4
(Manitoba) Daley Peters	4
(Manitoba) David Kraichy	7

=== C event ===
Third Knockout		Semifinals		Qualifier 5
(Manitoba) Geoff Trimble	9
(Manitoba) Neal Watkins	2	(Manitoba) Geoff Trimble	7
(Manitoba) Richard Muntain	2	(Manitoba) Sam Good	6
(Manitoba) Sam Good	5			(Manitoba) Geoff Trimble	5
				(Manitoba) Rae Kujanpaa	3

Third Knockout
(North Dakota) Owen Sampson	7
(Manitoba) Mark Hadway	8

Quarterfinals
(Saskatchewan) Terry Marteniuk	7
(Manitoba) Dave Elias	9
(Manitoba) Kyle Foster	7
(Manitoba) Mark Hadway	3

Semifinals
(Manitoba) Dave Elias	2
(Manitoba) Scott Ramsay	7
(Manitoba) Kyle Foster	12
(Manitoba) Bryan Preston	5

Qualifier 6
(Manitoba) Scott Ramsay	5
(Manitoba) Kyle Foster	7

Third Knockout
(Manitoba) Dave Boehmer	9
(Manitoba) Glen Toews	1

Quarterfinals
(Saskatchewan) Brent Gedak	5
(Manitoba) Dave Boehmer	2
(Saskatchewan) Tyler Krupski	3
(Manitoba) Sam Antila	8

Semifinals
(Saskatchewan) Brent Gedak	8
(Manitoba) Kelly Marnoch	6
(Manitoba) Sam Antila	2
(Manitoba) Jerry Chudley	5

Qualifier 7
(Saskatchewan) Brent Gedak	4
(Manitoba) Jerry Chudley	8

Third Knockout
(Manitoba) Darko Reischek	3
(Manitoba) Greg Todoruk	6

Quarterfinals
(Manitoba) Ryan Hyde	5
(Manitoba) Butch Mouck	6
(Manitoba) Scott Madams	0
(Manitoba) Greg Todoruk	6

Semifinals
(Manitoba) Butch Mouck	1
(Manitoba) Greg Todoruk	7

Qualifier 8
(Manitoba) Greg Todoruk	3
(Manitoba) Daley Peters	4

== Playoffs ==
The playoffs draw is listed as follows:

Quarterfinals
(Saskatchewan) Scott Bitz	8
(Manitoba) Kyle Foster	7
(Manitoba) David Kraichy	3
(Manitoba) Geoff Trimble	2
(Saskatchewan) Randy Bryden	6
(Manitoba) Jerry Chudley	4
(Manitoba) Jared Kolomaya	7
(Manitoba) Daley Peters	0

Semifinals
(Saskatchewan) Scott Bitz	5
(Manitoba) David Kraichy	3
(Saskatchewan) Randy Bryden	8
(Manitoba) Jared Kolomaya	3

Final
(Saskatchewan) Scott Bitz	3
(Saskatchewan) Randy Bryden	5
