= Suzanne Walker =

American biochemist and researcher

- Occupations: Biochemist; researcher; professor

Academic background
- Education: University of Chicago (B.A.); Princeton University (Ph.D.)

Academic work
- Institutions: Harvard University
- Main interests: Antibiotics and antibiotic resistance

Suzanne Walker is a professor of Microbiology and Molecular Genetics at Harvard Medical School. She is affiliated with the Department of Chemistry and Chemical Biology at Harvard University, and is a founder and current director of Harvard's Ph.D. Program in Chemical Biology. Her research focuses on mechanisms of antibiotics and antibiotic resistance. She was elected to the National Academy of Sciences in 2020.

== Early life and education ==
Dr. Walker grew up in Gallup, New Mexico, and earned her bachelor's degree in English Literature from the University of Chicago. As an undergraduate, she also completed coursework in chemistry and conducted research in David Lynn's laboratory, where she isolated and characterized a plant-derived natural product. She went on to receive her Ph.D. in Organic Chemistry from Princeton University. Under the supervision of Jay Groves and Dan Kahne, she developed a novel glycosylation method, determined the structure of a glycosylated antitumor antibiotic bound to DNA, and developed a lasting interest in the biological roles of sugars.

== Career ==
In 1995, Walker joined the faculty at Princeton University as an adjunct professor of chemistry, reaching the rank of Full Professor in 2003. She was the first woman to become a Full Professor of Chemistry at Princeton. In 2004, Walker joined the faculty at Harvard Medical School. Professor Walker's research program creatively integrates chemical, biochemical, and genetic approaches to address fundamental biological questions. A central focus of her work has been understanding how the bacterial cell envelope is assembled and how its components function together to support bacterial survival, with the overarching goal of identifying new vulnerabilities that can be targeted to combat antibiotic-resistant infections.

Professor Walker's research is of the highest caliber, and the impact of her work has been widely recognized through numerous accolades. Professor Walker is a member of the American Academy of Microbiology, the American Academy of Arts and Sciences, and the National Academy of Sciences. She served as an associate editor for the Journal of the American Chemical Society. She is also the recipient of several distinguished awards and honors, including an Alfred P. Sloan Foundation Fellowship, a Camille Dreyfus Teacher-Scholar Award, the Emil Thomas Kaiser Award in Protein Chemistry, an Arthur C. Cope Scholar Award, the Andrew Braisted Lectureship Award in Chemical Biology, the American Chemical Society Chemical Biology Lectureship Award, and the President's Innovator Award from the Society for Glycobiology.
