= Randy Woytowich =

Canadian curler

Medal record

Curling

Representing Saskatchewan

Labatt Brier
Silver medal – second place	1991 Hamilton	

Randy Woytowich (born July 22, 1954) is a Canadian curler from Saskatchewan. He is a former Canadian mixed champion and two-time provincial men's champion.

As a junior curler, Woytowich and teammates Rick Woytowich, Ben Dies and John Kuffner won the Saskatchewan junior men's provincial championship.

In 1984, Woytowich, Kathy Fahlman, Brian McCusker and Jan Betker won the provincial mixed championship, and then went on to win the Canadian Mixed Curling Championship, representing Saskatchewan. The team went undefeated at the event, and earned a direct spot in the final against Quebec, which they won. The team was inducted into the Saskatchewan Sports Hall of Fame in 2018.

In 1990, Woytowich formed a men's team with McCusker at third, Wyatt Buck at second and John Grundy at lead. They won the 1991 Labatt Tankard provincial championship, earning the right to represent Saskatchewan at the 1991 Labatt Brier, Canada's national men's curling championship. At the Brier, Woytowich led his rink to an 8-3 round robin record, in a tie for first place with Alberta's Kevin Martin rink. By virtue of beating Alberta in the round robin, they earned a direct berth into the final, while Alberta had to play in a semifinal match against British Columbia. Alberta won that semifinal, setting up a re-match against Saskatchewan, which they won 8-4. It would be the first of four Brier wins for Martin. The win was controversial for Martin, as when his was losing in the final, Martin brought out his corn broom, which littered the ice with its chaff. This frustrated the Woytowich rink, causing their rocks to pick, and ultimately to lose the game. Martin denied using this tactic.

The following season, the Woytowich rink had a lot of success on the cashspiel circuit, but could not make it to provincials. They did manage to win the provincial Labatt Tankard championship in 1993, sending the rink to the 1993 Labatt Brier. At the Brier, Woytowich led his rink to a 6-5 round robin record, missing the playoffs. The team disbanded in 1994, and Woytowich would not return to another Brier. In fact, he did not return to the provincial championships until 2013.

Woytowich continued to curl competitively until 2014. For most of his career, he lived in Regina, but would later move to Saskatoon.
