= Diane Foster (curler) =

Canadian curler

Medal record

Curling

World Senior Championships
Gold medal – first place	2008 Vierumäki	

Diane Foster (née Anderson; born c. 1955 or 1956) is a Canadian curler from Calgary. She is a former World Senior Curling Champion.

== Early life ==
Foster grew up near Kelvington, Saskatchewan, and Hudson Bay, Saskatchewan and as a junior made it as far as the Saskatchewan provincial junior championships. Foster spent two years in Houston, Texas when her husband worked for an oil company there, before moving to Edmonton, and then to Calgary in 1985.

== Women's career ==
Foster's only appearance at the national Tournament of Hearts was in 1986 as the alternate for the Alberta team, skipped by Lil Werenka. The team went 4–7, though Foster did not play any games.

Foster did not qualify for the Alberta Tournament of Hearts provincial women's championship until 1996, even despite being the leading money earner in Canadian women's curling one season. Her team of Kathy Reynolds, Marilyn Meschishnick and Crystal Rumberg went 2–7 at the Alberta Hearts that year. She did not return to the provincial championship until 2015, when her rink of Nicole Siebert, Jacqueline Brett and Raelynne Watkins won the Southern Alberta A Final. The team finished the 2005 Alberta Hearts with a 2–5 record.

On the World Curling Tour, Foster won the Meyers Norris Penny Charity Classic and the Pot of Gold Charity Cashspiel in 2005 with team mates Andrea Wilson, Brett and Watkins. She also played in a couple of the early women's Slams, including the 2006, 2007 and 2008 Wayden Transportation Ladies Classics and 2006, 2008 and 2009 Autumn Gold Curling Classics.

== Seniors career ==
Foster became eligible for Seniors play when she turned 50 during the 2005–06 season, and joined the Shirley McPherson rink at third. The team won the Alberta provincial seniors title that season. The team represented Alberta at the 2006 Canadian Senior Curling Championships, where they finished the round robin with a 5–6 record. The next season, McPherson and Foster switched positions, with Foster skipping the rink, which also consisted of Chris Wilson and Shirley Kohuch. The team won their second straight provincials in 2007, Foster led the team to a first place round robin record at the 2007 Canadian Senior Curling Championships, with a 9–2 record. The team then defeated British Columbia in the final. The team then represented Canada at the 2008 World Senior Curling Championships, where Foster led the team to a 7–2 record, before beating Switzerland in the semifinals and Scotland in the finals to claim the gold medal.

Foster, with a new team of Karen Morrison, Barb McDonald and Louse Sheeran won her third provincial seniors title in 2010. At the 2010 Canadian Senior Curling Championships, she led her team to a 5–6 record. Foster admitted to being not fully prepared for the event, as she had been helping her son renovate his house at the time. Her team of June Campbell, Morrison and Glenna Rubin won the Alberta Senior title again in 2011. At the 2011 Canadian Senior Curling Championships, with her distractions behind her, she led her team to a 7–4 round robin record, just missing the playoffs.

Foster won the 2017 and 2018 Alberta Masters Championships.

Foster won the Alberta Seniors Provincial Championship again in 2022 with teammates Morrison, Bev Buckley and Darlene Hall, and also won the provincial Masters Championship that year.
