= Randy Bryden =

Canadian curler (born 1970)

- Curler
- Born: January 20, 1970 (age 56)

Team
- Curling club: Callie CC; Regina, SK
- Skip: Randy Bryden
- Third: Troy Robinson
- Second: Russ Bryden
- Lead: Chris Semenchuck

Curling career
- Member Association: Saskatchewan
- Other appearances: World Senior Championship: 1 (2025)
Medal record
Representing Canada
World Senior Championships
Gold medal – first place	2025 Fredericton

Randy Bryden (born January 20, 1970) is a Canadian curler from Regina, Saskatchewan. He is a former Canadian Mixed champion, Canadian Senior Champion, and is the current World Senior men's champion skip.

As a junior curler, Bryden skipped teams to three-straight provincial championships. At the 1987 Canadian Junior Curling Championships, he led a team of Dean Klippenstine, Craig Fiske and Jamie Mathieson to a 6–5 record. At the 1988 Canadian Juniors, he led Klippenstine, Fiske and Rick Stack to an 8–3 round robin record, and lost to British Columbia's Mike Wood rink in the semifinal. At the 1989 Juniors, he led a new team of Troy Robinson, Troy Riche and Mark Zacharias to a 7–4 record, losing to Ontario's David Allan in a tiebreaker.

Bryden is notable for winning the 1996 Canadian Mixed Curling Championship for Saskatchewan with teammates Cathy Trowell, brother Russ and Karen Inglis (Trowell's sister).

Bryden has yet to represent his province at the Brier. He has won two career World Curling Tour events, winning the Horizon Laser Vision Center Classic in 2010 and the Dauphin Clinic Pharmacy Classic in 2012.

Bryden represented Saskatchewan at the 2022, and 2024 Canadian Senior Curling Championships, winning the latter.

His 1996 Canadian Mixed championship rink was inducted into the Saskatchewan Sports Hall of Fame in 2014. Bryden's father Gary, was inducted into the Hall of Fame as well for winning the 1998 Canadian Senior Curling Championships.

Bryden is a graduate of the University of Regina, where he received a degree in administration.
