= Scott Bitz =

Canadian curler

- Curler
- Born: October 29, 1973 (age 53); Regina, Saskatchewan, Canada

Team
- Curling club: Sutherland CC, Saskatoon, SK
- Skip: Scott Bitz
- Third: Warren Jackson
- Second: Aryn Schmidt
- Lead: Rory Golanowski

Curling career
- Brier: 2 (2002, 2009)
- Top CTRS ranking: 24th (2013-14)

Scott Bitz (born October 29, 1973) is a Canadian curler from Grand Coulee, Saskatchewan. He is a two-time provincial champion.

== Career ==
Bitz was born in Regina, Saskatchewan. In 1992, Bitz won the junior provincial championship, giving him the right to represent Saskatchewan at the 1992 Canadian Junior Curling Championships. His team of Jeff Tait, Pat Simmons and Greg Burrows finished the round robin with a 6–5 record. They won their first tiebreaker match against Ontario, but lost their second to Prince Edward Island.

Ten years later, Bitz won his first provincial championship. This allowed Bitz to curl in his first Brier. At the 2002 Nokia Brier, Bitz and his team of Mark Lang, Brian McCusker and Kelly Moskowy finished with a 7–4 record, and they would lose in their only playoff match against New Brunswick's Russ Howard. Bitz won his second provincial title in 2009, as a third for Joel Jordison. The team finished 3–8 at the 2009 Tim Hortons Brier, out of the playoffs. That team also played at the 2010 Olympic pre-trials, where they lost all three of their games.

Bitz had played for Jordison from 2006 until 2010 when Jordison left the team. Bitz then formed his own team, and participated in the provincials in 2011 and 2012, but was unable to qualify to the playoffs in both.

== Personal life ==
Bitz is a chiropractor with a degree from the University of Regina. Bitz also attended the Canadian Memorial Chiropractic College.

== Teams ==
Season	Skip	Third	Second	Lead	Events
1999–00	Pat Simmons	Scott Bitz	Brian McCusker	Ron Pugsley	
2002–03	Scott Bitz	Mark Lang	Brian McCusker	Kelly Moskowy	2002 Sask., Brier
2009–10	Joel Jordison	Scott Bitz	Aryn Schmidt	Dean Hicke	2009 Sask., Brier
2010–11	Scott Bitz	Mark Lang	Aryn Schmidt	Dean Hicke	
2011–12	Scott Bitz	Mark Lang	Aryn Schmidt	Dean Hicke	
2012–13	Scott Bitz	Jeff Sharp	Aryn Schmidt	Dean Hicke	
