= 2022 Saville Shoot-Out =

- Host city: Edmonton, Alberta
- Arena: Saville Community Sports Centre
- Dates: September 9–11
- Winner: (Manitoba) Team Jones
- Curling club: St. Vital CC, Winnipeg & Altona CC, Altona
- Skip: Jennifer Jones
- Third: Karlee Burgess
- Second: Mackenzie Zacharias
- Lead: Lauren Lenentine
- Alternate: Emily Zacharias
- Coach: Viktor Kjäll
- Finalist: (Ontario) Team Homan

The 2022 Saville Shoot-Out was held from September 9 to 11 at the Saville Community Sports Centre in Edmonton, Alberta. The event was held in a round robin format with a $24,000 purse.

Jennifer Jones and her team of Karlee Burgess, Mackenzie Zacharias, Lauren Lenentine and Emily Zacharias won the event, capping off a perfect 8–0 weekend by defeating Ontario's Team Rachel Homan, skipped by Tracy Fleury, 5–4 in the event final. The Jones rink opened with a steal of two in the first end which they extended to a three point lead with a steal of one in the fifth. In the seventh, Team Homan tied the score by stealing two points of their own to level the score at four all heading into the final end. There, Jones executed a runback to score the single point and the win. To reach the final, Jones won 9–3 over South Korea's Gim Eun-ji while Homan defeated Alberta's Casey Scheidegger 6–4. Kerry Galusha, Ikue Kitazawa, Serena Gray-Withers and Selina Witschonke rounded out the playoff field.

== Teams ==
The teams are listed as follows:

Skip	Third	Second	Lead	Alternate	Locale
Abby Ackland	Kaitlyn Jones	Meghan Walter	Sara Oliver		Winnipeg, Manitoba
Corryn Brown	Erin Pincott	Dezaray Hawes	Samantha Fisher		Kamloops, British Columbia
Chelsea Carey	Jolene Campbell	Liz Fyfe	Rachel Erickson	Jamie Sinclair	Winnipeg, Manitoba
Jo-Ann Rizzo (Fourth)	Sarah Koltun	Margot Flemming	Kerry Galusha (Skip)		Yellowknife, Northwest Territories
Gim Eun-ji	Kim Min-ji	Kim Su-ji	Seol Ye-eun	Seol Ye-ji	Uijeongbu, South Korea
Serena Gray-Withers	Catherine Clifford	Brianna Cullen	Zoe Cinnamon		Edmonton, Alberta
Ha Seung-youn	Kim Hye-rin	Yang Tae-i	Kim Su-jin		Chuncheon, South Korea
Rachel Homan (Fourth)	Tracy Fleury (Skip)	Emma Miskew	Sarah Wilkes		Ottawa, Ontario
Ashley Howard	Cary-Anne McTaggart	Sara England	Shelby Brandt		Regina, Saskatchewan
Jessie Hunkin	Kristen Streifel	Becca Hebert	Dayna Demers		Edmonton, Alberta
Jennifer Jones	Karlee Burgess	Mackenzie Zacharias	Lauren Lenentine	Emily Zacharias	Winnipeg, Manitoba
Selina Witschonke	Elena Mathis	Malin Da Ros (Note: Malin Da Ros spared for Raphaela Keiser.)	Marina Lörtscher		St. Moritz, Switzerland
Ikue Kitazawa	Seina Nakajima	Minori Suzuki	Hasumi Ishigooka	Chiaki Matsumura	Nagano, Japan
Nancy Martin	Lindsay Bertsch	Jennifer Armstrong	Krysten Karwacki		Saskatoon, Saskatchewan
Kristie Moore	Susan O'Connor	Janais DeJong	Valerie Ekelund		Sexsmith, Alberta
Kelsey Rocque	Danielle Schmiemann	Dana Ferguson	Rachelle Brown		Edmonton, Alberta
Casey Scheidegger	Kate Hogan	Jessie Haughian	Taylor McDonald		Lethbridge, Alberta
Kayla Skrlik	Geri-Lynn Ramsay	Brittany Tran	Ashton Skrlik		Calgary, Alberta
Selena Sturmay	Abby Marks	Kate Goodhelpsen	Paige Papley		Edmonton, Alberta
Kristy Watling	Hailey McFarlane	Emilie Rafsnon	Sarah Pyke	Laura Burtnyk	Winnipeg, Manitoba

== Round-robin standings ==
Final round-robin standings

Key
Teams to Playoffs

Pool A	W	L
(Ontario) Team Homan	5	0
(Northwest Territories) Kerry Galusha	4	1
(Alberta) Kelsey Rocque	3	2
(Alberta) Kayla Skrlik	1	4
(Manitoba) Abby Ackland	0	5

Pool B	W	L
(South Korea) Gim Eun-ji	4	1
(Japan) Ikue Kitazawa	3	2
(South Korea) Ha Seung-youn	2	3
(Alberta) Selena Sturmay	2	3
(Saskatchewan) Nancy Martin	1	4

Pool C	W	L
(Alberta) Casey Scheidegger	4	1
(Alberta) Serena Gray-Withers	3	2
(Manitoba) Kristy Watling	3	2
(Alberta) Jessie Hunkin	2	3
(Manitoba) Chelsea Carey	2	3

Pool D	W	L
(Manitoba) Jennifer Jones	5	0
(Switzerland) Team Keiser	3	2
(Alberta) Kristie Moore	2	3
(Saskatchewan) Ashley Howard	1	4
(British Columbia) Corryn Brown	0	5

== Round-robin results ==
All draw times listed in Mountain Time (UTC−06:00).

=== Draw 1 ===
Friday, September 9, 2:00 pm

Sheet 1	1	2	3	4	5	6	7	8	Final
(Alberta) Kayla Skrlik 🔨	0	1	0	1	0	1	X	X	3
(Northwest Territories) Kerry Galusha	1	0	4	0	3	0	X	X	8

Sheet 3	1	2	3	4	5	6	7	8	Final
(Alberta) Kelsey Rocque 🔨	0	5	0	0	1	0	0	0	6
(Manitoba) Abby Ackland	0	0	2	1	0	0	1	1	5

Sheet 5	1	2	3	4	5	6	7	8	Final
(Japan) Ikue Kitazawa 🔨	2	0	2	0	1	0	1	X	6
(Alberta) Selena Sturmay	0	1	0	1	0	2	0	X	4

Sheet 7	1	2	3	4	5	6	7	8	Final
(Manitoba) Chelsea Carey 🔨	2	3	1	0	0	2	X	X	8
(Alberta) Kristie Moore	0	0	0	1	1	0	X	X	2

Sheet 9	1	2	3	4	5	6	7	8	Final
(Manitoba) Jennifer Jones 🔨	2	0	2	0	3	2	X	X	9
(British Columbia) Corryn Brown	0	1	0	2	0	0	X	X	3

Sheet 2	1	2	3	4	5	6	7	8	Final
(Ontario) Team Homan 🔨	1	0	1	1	0	2	2	X	7
(South Korea) Ha Seung-youn	0	1	0	0	1	0	0	X	2

Sheet 4	1	2	3	4	5	6	7	8	Final
(South Korea) Gim Eun-ji 🔨	3	0	0	2	0	1	0	X	6
(Saskatchewan) Nancy Martin	0	1	1	0	1	0	1	X	4

Sheet 6	1	2	3	4	5	6	7	8	9	Final
(Alberta) Serena Gray-Withers 🔨	1	0	2	0	0	2	1	0	1	7
(Manitoba) Kristy Watling	0	1	0	2	1	0	0	2	0	6

Sheet 8	1	2	3	4	5	6	7	8	Final
(Alberta) Casey Scheidegger	0	0	0	3	1	1	1	X	6
(Alberta) Jessie Hunkin 🔨	0	2	1	0	0	0	0	X	3

Sheet 10	1	2	3	4	5	6	7	8	Final
(Saskatchewan) Ashley Howard 🔨	1	0	0	0	0	0	X	X	1
(Switzerland) Team Keiser	0	2	2	1	1	2	X	X	8

=== Draw 2 ===
Friday, September 9, 7:00 pm

Sheet 1	1	2	3	4	5	6	7	8	Final
(Alberta) Jessie Hunkin 🔨	1	3	2	1	X	X	X	X	7
(Manitoba) Chelsea Carey	0	0	0	0	X	X	X	X	0

Sheet 3	1	2	3	4	5	6	7	8	Final
(Manitoba) Kristy Watling 🔨	1	1	0	3	5	X	X	X	10
(British Columbia) Corryn Brown	0	0	1	0	0	X	X	X	1

Sheet 5	1	2	3	4	5	6	7	8	Final
(Saskatchewan) Ashley Howard 🔨	0	1	0	1	0	X	X	X	2
(Manitoba) Jennifer Jones	3	0	2	0	3	X	X	X	8

Sheet 7	1	2	3	4	5	6	7	8	Final
(Alberta) Kelsey Rocque 🔨	1	0	0	3	0	3	X	X	7
(Alberta) Kayla Skrlik	0	0	1	0	1	0	X	X	2

Sheet 9	1	2	3	4	5	6	7	8	Final
(Alberta) Selena Sturmay	0	0	1	0	1	0	0	X	2
(South Korea) Ha Seung-youn 🔨	0	1	0	3	0	1	0	X	5

Sheet 2	1	2	3	4	5	6	7	8	Final
(Alberta) Casey Scheidegger 🔨	2	0	2	0	2	0	0	1	7
(Alberta) Serena Gray-Withers	0	2	0	2	0	1	1	0	6

Sheet 4	1	2	3	4	5	6	7	8	Final
(Switzerland) Team Keiser 🔨	2	0	3	3	0	0	X	X	8
(Alberta) Kristie Moore	0	1	0	0	1	1	X	X	3

Sheet 6	1	2	3	4	5	6	7	8	Final
(Manitoba) Abby Ackland	1	1	0	0	1	1	0	0	4
(Ontario) Team Homan 🔨	0	0	2	2	0	0	1	1	6

Sheet 8	1	2	3	4	5	6	7	8	Final
(Northwest Territories) Kerry Galusha	0	1	1	0	1	1	0	2	6
(Saskatchewan) Nancy Martin 🔨	1	0	0	1	0	0	3	0	5

Sheet 10	1	2	3	4	5	6	7	8	Final
(Japan) Ikue Kitazawa	0	0	1	0	0	X	X	X	1
(South Korea) Gim Eun-ji 🔨	2	1	0	3	3	X	X	X	9

=== Draw 3 ===
Saturday, September 10, 9:00 am

Sheet 1	1	2	3	4	5	6	7	8	Final
(Saskatchewan) Nancy Martin	1	0	0	0	1	1	0	3	6
(South Korea) Ha Seung-youn 🔨	0	1	1	1	0	0	2	0	5

Sheet 3	1	2	3	4	5	6	7	8	Final
(Alberta) Selena Sturmay	1	1	0	2	0	0	2	0	6
(South Korea) Gim Eun-ji 🔨	0	0	1	0	2	2	0	4	9

Sheet 5	1	2	3	4	5	6	7	8	Final
(Northwest Territories) Kerry Galusha 🔨	1	0	0	1	0	X	X	X	2
(Ontario) Team Homan	0	2	4	0	3	X	X	X	9

Sheet 7	1	2	3	4	5	6	7	8	Final
(Alberta) Jessie Hunkin 🔨	0	0	0	0	0	1	X	X	1
(Alberta) Serena Gray-Withers	2	1	1	1	1	0	X	X	6

Sheet 9	1	2	3	4	5	6	7	8	Final
(Alberta) Casey Scheidegger 🔨	2	0	2	0	2	0	1	X	7
(Saskatchewan) Ashley Howard	0	3	0	1	0	1	0	X	5

Sheet 2	1	2	3	4	5	6	7	8	Final
(Manitoba) Abby Ackland	0	1	0	0	0	0	1	X	2
(Alberta) Kayla Skrlik 🔨	0	0	2	1	1	1	0	X	5

Sheet 4	1	2	3	4	5	6	7	8	9	Final
(Alberta) Kelsey Rocque 🔨	1	0	2	0	3	0	1	0	1	8
(Japan) Ikue Kitazawa	0	1	0	4	0	1	0	1	0	7

Sheet 6	1	2	3	4	5	6	7	8	Final
(British Columbia) Corryn Brown	0	1	0	0	1	1	0	X	3
(Alberta) Kristie Moore 🔨	2	0	3	2	0	0	1	X	8

Sheet 8	1	2	3	4	5	6	7	8	Final
(Switzerland) Team Keiser	0	0	2	0	1	0	0	X	3
(Manitoba) Jennifer Jones 🔨	2	1	0	2	0	1	1	X	7

Sheet 10	1	2	3	4	5	6	7	8	Final
(Manitoba) Kristy Watling	0	1	0	0	0	2	1	0	4
(Manitoba) Chelsea Carey 🔨	2	0	0	1	1	0	0	1	5

=== Draw 4 ===
Saturday, September 10, 2:00 pm

Sheet 1	1	2	3	4	5	6	7	8	Final
(Manitoba) Kristy Watling 🔨	2	0	2	0	1	0	2	X	7
(Alberta) Casey Scheidegger	0	2	0	1	0	2	0	X	5

Sheet 3	1	2	3	4	5	6	7	8	9	Final
(Alberta) Jessie Hunkin 🔨	0	1	0	1	2	0	1	0	1	6
(Switzerland) Team Keiser	0	0	3	0	0	1	0	1	0	5

Sheet 5	1	2	3	4	5	6	7	8	Final
(Manitoba) Chelsea Carey 🔨	1	0	0	2	1	0	2	0	6
(Alberta) Serena Gray-Withers	0	2	2	0	0	1	0	3	8

Sheet 7	1	2	3	4	5	6	7	8	Final
(South Korea) Ha Seung-youn	1	0	3	1	0	1	0	1	7
(South Korea) Gim Eun-ji 🔨	0	1	0	0	2	0	3	0	6

Sheet 9	1	2	3	4	5	6	7	8	Final
(Saskatchewan) Nancy Martin	0	0	1	0	0	X	X	X	1
(Japan) Ikue Kitazawa 🔨	1	1	0	2	2	X	X	X	6

Sheet 2	1	2	3	4	5	6	7	8	Final
(Alberta) Kristie Moore	1	0	2	0	2	0	0	X	5
(Manitoba) Jennifer Jones 🔨	0	2	0	1	0	4	1	X	8

Sheet 4	1	2	3	4	5	6	7	8	Final
(British Columbia) Corryn Brown 🔨	1	0	1	1	0	0	0	0	3
(Saskatchewan) Ashley Howard	0	2	0	0	1	1	1	1	6

Sheet 6	1	2	3	4	5	6	7	8	Final
(Northwest Territories) Kerry Galusha 🔨	2	1	0	2	0	1	1	X	7
(Alberta) Kelsey Rocque	0	0	1	0	1	0	0	X	2

Sheet 8	1	2	3	4	5	6	7	8	Final
(Manitoba) Abby Ackland	0	0	1	0	0	0	X	X	1
(Alberta) Selena Sturmay 🔨	3	0	0	1	1	3	X	X	8

Sheet 10	1	2	3	4	5	6	7	8	Final
(Ontario) Team Homan 🔨	0	0	2	3	0	0	1	X	6
(Alberta) Kayla Skrlik	0	1	0	0	1	1	0	X	3

=== Draw 5 ===
Saturday, September 10, 7:00 pm

Sheet 1	1	2	3	4	5	6	7	8	Final
(Ontario) Team Homan	0	2	0	0	0	1	1	1	5
(Alberta) Kelsey Rocque 🔨	0	0	2	1	1	0	0	0	4

Sheet 3	1	2	3	4	5	6	7	8	Final
(South Korea) Ha Seung-youn 🔨	1	0	1	1	1	0	0	0	4
(Japan) Ikue Kitazawa	0	2	0	0	0	2	0	1	5

Sheet 5	1	2	3	4	5	6	7	8	Final
(Alberta) Kayla Skrlik 🔨	0	0	2	0	0	0	0	X	2
(South Korea) Gim Eun-ji	0	1	0	1	0	1	1	X	4

Sheet 7	1	2	3	4	5	6	7	8	Final
(British Columbia) Corryn Brown 🔨	1	1	0	0	1	X	X	X	3
(Switzerland) Team Keiser	0	0	4	2	0	X	X	X	6

Sheet 9	1	2	3	4	5	6	7	8	Final
(Manitoba) Kristy Watling 🔨	0	3	1	0	0	2	1	X	7
(Alberta) Jessie Hunkin	0	0	0	1	1	0	0	X	2

Sheet 2	1	2	3	4	5	6	7	8	Final
(Saskatchewan) Nancy Martin	0	2	0	2	0	1	0	1	6
(Alberta) Selena Sturmay 🔨	1	0	2	0	1	0	3	0	7

Sheet 4	1	2	3	4	5	6	7	8	9	Final
(Northwest Territories) Kerry Galusha 🔨	2	2	0	0	2	0	1	0	1	8
(Manitoba) Abby Ackland	0	0	2	1	0	2	0	2	0	7

Sheet 6	1	2	3	4	5	6	7	8	Final
(Manitoba) Chelsea Carey	0	0	0	1	0	X	X	X	1
(Alberta) Casey Scheidegger 🔨	1	4	1	0	3	X	X	X	9

Sheet 8	1	2	3	4	5	6	7	8	Final
(Alberta) Kristie Moore	0	2	1	0	3	1	X	X	7
(Saskatchewan) Ashley Howard 🔨	1	0	0	1	0	0	X	X	2

Sheet 10	1	2	3	4	5	6	7	8	Final
(Alberta) Serena Gray-Withers 🔨	0	1	1	0	2	0	1	0	5
(Manitoba) Jennifer Jones	1	0	0	2	0	2	0	1	6

== Playoffs ==
Quarterfinals
1	(Ontario) Team Homan	6
8	(Switzerland) Team Keiser	3
4	(Alberta) Casey Scheidegger	7
5	(Northwest Territories) Kerry Galusha	5
2	(Manitoba) Jennifer Jones	11
7	(Alberta) Serena Gray-Withers	3
3	(South Korea) Gim Eun-ji	7
6	(Japan) Ikue Kitazawa	2

Semifinals
1	(Ontario) Team Homan	6
4	(Alberta) Casey Scheidegger	4
2	(Manitoba) Jennifer Jones	9
3	(South Korea) Gim Eun-ji	3

Final
1	(Ontario) Team Homan	4
2	(Manitoba) Jennifer Jones	5

=== Quarterfinals ===
Sunday, September 11, 8:00 am

Sheet 2	1	2	3	4	5	6	7	8	Final
(Manitoba) Jennifer Jones 🔨	3	0	1	3	0	4	X	X	11
(Alberta) Serena Gray-Withers	0	2	0	0	1	0	X	X	3

Sheet 4	1	2	3	4	5	6	7	8	Final
(Ontario) Team Homan 🔨	0	1	0	2	0	2	0	1	6
(Switzerland) Team Keiser	0	0	1	0	1	0	1	0	3

Sheet 6	1	2	3	4	5	6	7	8	Final
(South Korea) Gim Eun-ji 🔨	0	2	0	2	1	2	X	X	7
(Japan) Ikue Kitazawa	0	0	2	0	0	0	X	X	2

Sheet 8	1	2	3	4	5	6	7	8	Final
(Alberta) Casey Scheidegger 🔨	0	2	0	2	0	2	0	1	7
(Northwest Territories) Kerry Galusha	0	0	2	0	2	0	1	0	5

=== Semifinals ===
Sunday, September 11, 11:00 am

Sheet 3	1	2	3	4	5	6	7	8	Final
(Manitoba) Jennifer Jones 🔨	2	0	1	0	1	0	5	X	9
(South Korea) Gim Eun-ji	0	1	0	1	0	1	0	X	3

Sheet 7	1	2	3	4	5	6	7	8	Final
(Ontario) Team Homan 🔨	0	0	2	0	2	0	1	1	6
(Alberta) Casey Scheidegger	0	1	0	1	0	2	0	0	4

=== Final ===
Sunday, September 11, 3:00 pm

Sheet 5	1	2	3	4	5	6	7	8	Final
(Ontario) Team Homan 🔨	0	1	0	0	0	1	2	0	4
(Manitoba) Jennifer Jones	2	0	0	1	1	0	0	1	5
