= 2022 Tour Challenge =

Grand Slam of Curling event

2022 HearingLife Tour Challenge
- Host city: Grande Prairie, Alberta
- Arena: Coca-Cola Centre
- Dates: October 18–23
- Men's winner: (Sweden) Team Edin
- Curling club: Karlstads CK, Karlstad
- Skip: Niklas Edin
- Third: Oskar Eriksson
- Second: Rasmus Wranå
- Lead: Christoffer Sundgren
- Coach: Fredrik Lindberg
- Finalist: (Manitoba) Matt Dunstone
- Women's winner: (Ontario) Team Homan
- Curling club: Ottawa CC, Ottawa
- Skip: Tracy Fleury
- Fourth: Rachel Homan
- Second: Emma Miskew
- Lead: Sarah Wilkes
- Coach: Ryan Fry
- Finalist: (Manitoba) Kerri Einarson

The 2022 HearingLife Tour Challenge was held from October 18 to 23 at the Coca-Cola Centre in Grande Prairie, Alberta. It was the second Grand Slam event of the 2022–23 curling season.

During the draw to the button before the semifinal games, Niklas Edin sustained a knee injury that forced him out of the event. His remaining three team members, Oskar Eriksson, Rasmus Wranå, and Christoffer Sundgren went on to win the semifinal game against Brad Gushue and then beat Matt Dunstone in the championship game.

== Qualification ==
The Tour Challenge consists of two tiers of 16 teams. For Tier 1, the top 16 ranked men's and women's teams on the World Curling Federation's world team rankings as of September 12, 2022 qualified. In the event that a team declines their invitation, the next-ranked team on the world team ranking is invited until the field is complete. For Tier 2, the next 11 teams on the WCF rankings as of September 15, 2022 were invited. The final 5 teams in Tier 2 are filled by regional invitations extended by the Grand Slam of Curling.

=== Men ===
==== Tier 1 ====
Top world team ranking men's teams:

1. (Newfoundland and Labrador) Brad Gushue
2. (Sweden) Niklas Edin
3. (Scotland) Bruce Mouat
4. (Alberta) Brendan Bottcher
5. (Italy) Joël Retornaz
6. (Manitoba) Matt Dunstone
7. (Manitoba) Reid Carruthers
8. (Scotland) Ross Whyte
9. (Switzerland) Yannick Schwaller
10. (Alberta) Kevin Koe
11. (Saskatchewan) Colton Flasch
12. (Switzerland) Marco Hösli
13. (Switzerland) Michael Brunner
14. (Ontario) ~~Glenn Howard~~
15. (Norway) Steffen Walstad
16. (Ontario) John Epping
17. (Ontario) Tanner Horgan

==== Tier 2 ====
World Team Rankings teams:

1. (Ontario) Mike McEwen
2. (United States) Korey Dropkin
3. (Netherlands) ~~Wouter Gösgens~~
4. (Alberta) Karsten Sturmay
5. (United States) John Shuster
6. (Norway) ~~Magnus Ramsfjell~~
7. (Saskatchewan) Kody Hartung
8. (Switzerland) Yves Stocker
9. (Norway) Lukas Høstmælingen
10. (Alberta) Aaron Sluchinski
11. (South Korea) Kim Chang-min
12. (Quebec) Félix Asselin
13. (Manitoba) Ryan Wiebe

Regional teams:

1. (Alberta) Kyler Kleibrink
2. (British Columbia) Jacques Gauthier
3. (Alberta) Ryan Jacques
4. (Alberta) Johnson Tao
5. (Alberta) Scott Webb

=== Women ===
==== Tier 1 ====
Top world team ranking women's teams:

1. (Sweden) Anna Hasselborg
2. (Manitoba) Kerri Einarson
3. (Japan) Satsuki Fujisawa
4. (Manitoba) Kaitlyn Lawes
5. (Ontario) Tracy Fleury
6. (Switzerland) Silvana Tirinzoni
7. (South Korea) Kim Eun-jung
8. (Manitoba) Jennifer Jones
9. (South Korea) Gim Eun-ji
10. (Manitoba) Chelsea Carey
11. (Sweden) Isabella Wranå
12. (Germany) Daniela Jentsch
13. (United States) Tabitha Peterson
14. (Alberta) Casey Scheidegger
15. (Ontario) Hollie Duncan
16. (Switzerland) Raphaela Keiser

==== Tier 2 ====
World Team Rankings teams:

1. (Ontario) Krista McCarville
2. (Northwest Territories) Kerry Galusha
3. (Alberta) Kelsey Rocque
4. (Alberta) Selena Sturmay
5. (British Columbia) Clancy Grandy
6. (Nova Scotia) Christina Black
7. (Saskatchewan) ~~Penny Barker~~
8. (Denmark) Madeleine Dupont
9. (New Brunswick) Andrea Kelly
10. (Manitoba) Kristy Watling
11. (Saskatchewan) Nancy Martin
12. (Scotland) Beth Farmer

Regional teams:

1. (Alberta) Jessie Hunkin
2. (Alberta) Serena Gray-Withers
3. (Alberta) Kayla Skrlik
4. (Alberta) Elysa Crough
5. (Alberta) Kristie Moore

== Men ==
=== Tier 1 ===
==== Teams ====
The teams are listed as follows:

Skip	Third	Second	Lead	Alternate	Locale
Brendan Bottcher	Marc Kennedy	Brett Gallant	Ben Hebert		Calgary, Alberta
Michael Brunner	Romano Meier	Anthony Petoud	Marcel Käufeler		Bern, Switzerland
Reid Carruthers	Jason Gunnlaugson	Derek Samagalski	Connor Njegovan		Winnipeg, Manitoba
Matt Dunstone	B. J. Neufeld	Colton Lott	Ryan Harnden		Winnipeg, Manitoba
Niklas Edin	Oskar Eriksson	Rasmus Wranå	Christoffer Sundgren		Karlstad, Sweden
John Epping	Mat Camm	Pat Janssen	Scott Chadwick		Toronto, Ontario
Colton Flasch	Catlin Schneider	Kevin Marsh	Dan Marsh		Saskatoon, Saskatchewan
Brad Gushue	Mark Nichols	E. J. Harnden	Geoff Walker		St. John's, Newfoundland and Labrador
Philipp Hösli (Note: Martin Rios spared for Marco Hösli. He played second while Marco Hefti and Philipp Hösli each moved up the lineup one position.)	Marco Hefti	Martin Rios	Justin Hausherr	Andreas Gerlach	Glarus, Switzerland
Tanner Horgan	Jacob Horgan	Joey Hart (Note: Joey Hart spared for Darren Moulding. He played second while Jacob Horgan moved up to third.)	Colin Hodgson		Sudbury, Ontario
Kevin Koe	Tyler Tardi	Brad Thiessen	Karrick Martin		Calgary, Alberta
Bruce Mouat	Grant Hardie	Bobby Lammie	Hammy McMillan Jr.		Stirling, Scotland
Joël Retornaz	Amos Mosaner	Sebastiano Arman	– (Note: Team Retornaz played with three players.)		Trentino, Italy
Benoît Schwarz (Fourth)	Yannick Schwaller (Skip)	Sven Michel	Pablo Lachat		Geneva, Switzerland
Steffen Walstad	Magnus Nedregotten	Mathias Brænden	Magnus Vågberg		Oppdal, Norway
Ross Whyte	Robin Brydone	Duncan McFadzean	Euan Kyle		Stirling, Scotland

==== Round-robin standings ====
Final round-robin standings

Key
Teams to Playoffs
Teams to Tiebreakers

Pool A	W	L	PF	PA
(Newfoundland and Labrador) Brad Gushue	4	0	30	13
(Manitoba) Matt Dunstone	3	1	26	21
(Ontario) John Epping	2	2	21	22
(Ontario) Tanner Horgan	0	4	8	29

Pool B	W	L	PF	PA
(Scotland) Bruce Mouat	3	1	25	13
(Manitoba) Reid Carruthers	2	2	21	19
(Switzerland) Michael Brunner	1	3	17	29
(Scotland) Ross Whyte	1	3	22	24

Pool C	W	L	PF	PA
(Italy) Joël Retornaz	4	0	27	11
(Sweden) Niklas Edin	4	0	25	10
(Switzerland) Yannick Schwaller	3	1	25	18
(Norway) Steffen Walstad	1	3	18	24

Pool D	W	L	PF	PA
(Alberta) Kevin Koe	2	2	16	17
(Saskatchewan) Colton Flasch	1	3	15	22
(Switzerland) Team Hösli	1	3	16	28
(Alberta) Brendan Bottcher	0	4	16	28

==== Round-robin results ====
All draw times are listed in Mountain Time (UTC−06:00).

===== Draw 1 =====
Tuesday, October 18, 8:00 am

Sheet A	1	2	3	4	5	6	7	8	Final
(Scotland) Bruce Mouat	0	1	2	1	1	2	1	X	8
(Ontario) Tanner Horgan 🔨	2	0	0	0	0	0	0	X	2

Sheet B	1	2	3	4	5	6	7	8	Final
(Manitoba) Matt Dunstone 🔨	2	0	1	0	2	1	0	2	8
(Scotland) Ross Whyte	0	2	0	2	0	0	2	0	6

Sheet C	1	2	3	4	5	6	7	8	Final
(Newfoundland and Labrador) Brad Gushue	0	2	3	2	0	2	X	X	9
(Switzerland) Michael Brunner 🔨	1	0	0	0	2	0	X	X	3

Sheet D	1	2	3	4	5	6	7	8	9	Final
(Manitoba) Reid Carruthers	0	2	0	0	0	0	3	0	1	6
(Ontario) John Epping 🔨	1	0	0	1	0	0	0	3	0	5

===== Draw 3 =====
Tuesday, October 18, 3:00 pm

Sheet A	1	2	3	4	5	6	7	8	Final
(Sweden) Niklas Edin 🔨	1	0	0	1	0	2	4	X	8
(Switzerland) Team Hösli	0	2	0	0	1	0	0	X	3

Sheet B	1	2	3	4	5	6	7	8	Final
(Italy) Joël Retornaz	0	0	1	0	3	0	2	0	6
(Saskatchewan) Colton Flasch 🔨	0	0	0	1	0	2	0	0	3

Sheet C	1	2	3	4	5	6	7	8	Final
(Alberta) Brendan Bottcher	0	0	0	0	2	2	0	X	4
(Norway) Steffen Walstad 🔨	2	2	1	2	0	0	1	X	8

Sheet D	1	2	3	4	5	6	7	8	Final
(Switzerland) Yannick Schwaller	0	0	3	0	0	0	0	X	3
(Alberta) Kevin Koe 🔨	0	2	0	2	0	1	1	X	6

===== Draw 6 =====
Wednesday, October 19, 12:00 pm

Sheet A	1	2	3	4	5	6	7	8	Final
(Manitoba) Matt Dunstone 🔨	1	0	3	0	4	0	1	X	9
(Switzerland) Michael Brunner	0	1	0	2	0	2	0	X	5

Sheet B	1	2	3	4	5	6	7	8	Final
(Manitoba) Reid Carruthers	0	2	0	0	1	4	X	X	7
(Ontario) Tanner Horgan 🔨	1	0	1	0	0	0	X	X	2

Sheet C	1	2	3	4	5	6	7	8	Final
(Scotland) Bruce Mouat 🔨	0	3	0	1	2	3	X	X	9
(Ontario) John Epping	0	0	1	0	0	0	X	X	1

Sheet D	1	2	3	4	5	6	7	8	Final
(Newfoundland and Labrador) Brad Gushue	2	2	0	0	1	0	3	X	8
(Scotland) Ross Whyte 🔨	0	0	2	1	0	1	0	X	4

===== Draw 8 =====
Wednesday, October 19, 8:00 pm

Sheet A	1	2	3	4	5	6	7	8	Final
(Alberta) Brendan Bottcher	0	0	2	0	0	2	0	0	4
(Switzerland) Yannick Schwaller 🔨	1	0	0	5	0	0	0	1	7

Sheet B	1	2	3	4	5	6	7	8	Final
(Alberta) Kevin Koe	1	0	3	0	0	3	1	X	8
(Norway) Steffen Walstad 🔨	0	2	0	2	0	0	0	X	4

Sheet C	1	2	3	4	5	6	7	8	Final
(Italy) Joël Retornaz 🔨	0	2	2	0	2	1	1	X	8
(Switzerland) Team Hösli	0	0	0	2	0	0	0	X	2

Sheet D	1	2	3	4	5	6	7	8	Final
(Sweden) Niklas Edin 🔨	0	0	1	0	1	0	3	2	7
(Saskatchewan) Colton Flasch	0	0	0	2	0	1	0	0	3

===== Draw 10 =====
Thursday, October 20, 12:00 pm

Sheet A	1	2	3	4	5	6	7	8	Final
(Saskatchewan) Colton Flasch 🔨	0	2	2	0	1	0	2	X	7
(Norway) Steffen Walstad	0	0	0	2	0	1	0	X	3

Sheet B	1	2	3	4	5	6	7	8	Final
(Switzerland) Yannick Schwaller 🔨	2	0	0	2	0	4	0	1	9
(Switzerland) Team Hösli	0	0	1	0	2	0	3	0	6

Sheet C	1	2	3	4	5	6	7	8	Final
(Sweden) Niklas Edin 🔨	0	1	0	1	0	1	0	X	3
(Alberta) Kevin Koe	0	0	1	0	0	0	0	X	1

Sheet D	1	2	3	4	5	6	7	8	Final
(Alberta) Brendan Bottcher	1	0	3	0	0	0	1	0	5
(Italy) Joël Retornaz 🔨	0	1	0	1	1	1	0	2	6

===== Draw 12 =====
Thursday, October 20, 8:00 pm

Sheet A	1	2	3	4	5	6	7	8	Final
(Newfoundland and Labrador) Brad Gushue	1	0	2	0	1	0	2	X	6
(Manitoba) Reid Carruthers 🔨	0	1	0	2	0	0	0	X	3

Sheet B	1	2	3	4	5	6	7	8	Final
(Ontario) John Epping	0	0	3	0	2	3	X	X	8
(Switzerland) Michael Brunner 🔨	0	1	0	2	0	0	X	X	3

Sheet C	1	2	3	4	5	6	7	8	Final
(Scotland) Ross Whyte	0	3	3	0	2	X	X	X	8
(Ontario) Tanner Horgan 🔨	0	0	0	1	0	X	X	X	1

Sheet D	1	2	3	4	5	6	7	8	Final
(Scotland) Bruce Mouat	0	0	0	2	2	1	0	X	5
(Manitoba) Matt Dunstone 🔨	0	0	1	0	0	0	2	X	3

===== Draw 13 =====
Friday, October 21, 8:30 am

Sheet A	1	2	3	4	5	6	7	8	Final
(Italy) Joël Retornaz 🔨	0	3	0	0	1	3	X	X	7
(Alberta) Kevin Koe	0	0	1	0	0	0	X	X	1

Sheet B	1	2	3	4	5	6	7	8	Final
(Sweden) Niklas Edin	0	0	0	2	0	1	1	3	7
(Alberta) Brendan Bottcher 🔨	0	0	1	0	2	0	0	0	3

Sheet C	1	2	3	4	5	6	7	8	Final
(Saskatchewan) Colton Flasch 🔨	0	0	1	0	0	1	0	X	2
(Switzerland) Yannick Schwaller	0	1	0	2	0	0	3	X	6

Sheet D	1	2	3	4	5	6	7	8	Final
(Switzerland) Team Hösli	0	1	1	1	0	0	2	X	5
(Norway) Steffen Walstad 🔨	1	0	0	0	1	1	0	X	3

===== Draw 15 =====
Friday, October 21, 4:00 pm

Sheet A	1	2	3	4	5	6	7	8	Final
(Scotland) Ross Whyte 🔨	0	0	0	2	0	0	2	X	4
(Ontario) John Epping	0	0	0	0	2	5	0	X	7

Sheet B	1	2	3	4	5	6	7	8	Final
(Newfoundland and Labrador) Brad Gushue 🔨	1	0	0	1	0	0	5	X	7
(Scotland) Bruce Mouat	0	0	1	0	2	0	0	X	3

Sheet C	1	2	3	4	5	6	7	8	Final
(Manitoba) Matt Dunstone 🔨	2	0	1	0	2	0	0	1	6
(Manitoba) Reid Carruthers	0	1	0	3	0	0	1	0	5

Sheet D	1	2	3	4	5	6	7	8	Final
(Switzerland) Michael Brunner	2	0	1	1	0	1	0	1	6
(Ontario) Tanner Horgan 🔨	0	1	0	0	2	0	0	0	3

==== Tiebreaker ====
Saturday, October 22, 8:00 am

Sheet D	1	2	3	4	5	6	7	8	Final
(Alberta) Kevin Koe 🔨	2	2	0	0	2	0	0	1	7
(Ontario) John Epping	0	0	1	0	0	3	1	0	5

Player percentages
(Alberta) Team Koe		(Ontario) Team Epping	
Karrick Martin	97%	Scott Chadwick	97%
Brad Thiessen	92%	Pat Janssen	83%
Tyler Tardi	86%	Mat Camm	88%
Kevin Koe	84%	John Epping	78%
Total	90%	Total	86%

==== Playoffs ====
Quarterfinals
1	(Italy) Joël Retornaz	5
8	(Alberta) Kevin Koe	7
4	(Manitoba) Matt Dunstone	8
5	(Switzerland) Yannick Schwaller	3
2	(Sweden) Niklas Edin	5
7	(Manitoba) Reid Carruthers	3
3	(Newfoundland and Labrador) Brad Gushue	8
6	(Scotland) Bruce Mouat	4

Semifinals
8	(Alberta) Kevin Koe	2
4	(Manitoba) Matt Dunstone	7
2	(Sweden) Team Edin	6
3	(Newfoundland and Labrador) Brad Gushue	5

Final
4	(Manitoba) Matt Dunstone	3
2	(Sweden) Team Edin	7

===== Quarterfinals =====
Saturday, October 22, 12:00 pm

Sheet A	1	2	3	4	5	6	7	8	Final
(Manitoba) Matt Dunstone 🔨	0	3	3	0	0	0	2	X	8
(Switzerland) Yannick Schwaller	0	0	0	2	1	0	0	X	3

Player percentages
(Manitoba) Team Dunstone		(Switzerland) Team Schwaller	
Ryan Harnden	88%	Pablo Lachat	95%
Colton Lott	82%	Sven Michel	77%
B. J. Neufeld	88%	Yannick Schwaller	77%
Matt Dunstone	79%	Benoît Schwarz	66%
Total	84%	Total	79%

Sheet B	1	2	3	4	5	6	7	8	Final
(Italy) Joël Retornaz 🔨	0	0	1	0	3	0	1	X	5
(Alberta) Kevin Koe	1	2	0	2	0	2	0	X	7

Player percentages
(Italy) Team Retornaz		(Alberta) Team Koe	
–		Karrick Martin	84%
Sebastiano Arman	87%	Brad Thiessen	95%
Amos Mosaner	85%	Tyler Tardi	89%
Joël Retornaz	70%	Kevin Koe	93%
Total	82%	Total	90%

Sheet C	1	2	3	4	5	6	7	8	Final
(Newfoundland and Labrador) Brad Gushue 🔨	1	0	2	0	1	0	2	2	8
(Scotland) Bruce Mouat	0	1	0	1	0	2	0	0	4

Player percentages
(Newfoundland and Labrador) Team Gushue		(Scotland) Team Mouat	
Geoff Walker	97%	Hammy McMillan Jr.	98%
E. J. Harnden	80%	Bobby Lammie	77%
Mark Nichols	92%	Grant Hardie	92%
Brad Gushue	94%	Bruce Mouat	79%
Total	91%	Total	87%

Sheet D	1	2	3	4	5	6	7	8	Final
(Sweden) Niklas Edin 🔨	0	2	0	0	0	0	0	3	5
(Manitoba) Reid Carruthers	0	0	0	0	1	1	1	0	3

Player percentages
(Sweden) Team Edin		(Manitoba) Team Carruthers	
Christoffer Sundgren	86%	Connor Njegovan	94%
Rasmus Wranå	94%	Derek Samagalski	86%
Oskar Eriksson	89%	Jason Gunnlaugson	91%
Niklas Edin	83%	Reid Carruthers	83%
Total	88%	Total	88%

===== Semifinals =====
Saturday, October 22, 8:00 pm

Sheet A	1	2	3	4	5	6	7	8	9	Final
(Sweden) Team Edin 🔨	1	0	2	0	0	1	0	1	1	6
(Newfoundland and Labrador) Brad Gushue	0	2	0	1	1	0	1	0	0	5

Player percentages
(Sweden) Team Edin		(Newfoundland and Labrador) Team Gushue	
–		Geoff Walker	100%
Christoffer Sundgren	89%	E. J. Harnden	83%
Rasmus Wranå	81%	Mark Nichols	82%
Oskar Eriksson	83%	Brad Gushue	82%
Total	84%	Total	87%

Sheet D	1	2	3	4	5	6	7	8	Final
(Alberta) Kevin Koe	0	0	1	0	1	0	X	X	2
(Manitoba) Matt Dunstone 🔨	2	1	0	1	0	3	X	X	7

Player percentages
(Alberta) Team Koe		(Manitoba) Team Dunstone	
Karrick Martin	95%	Ryan Harnden	89%
Brad Thiessen	84%	Colton Lott	93%
Tyler Tardi	73%	B. J. Neufeld	82%
Kevin Koe	69%	Matt Dunstone	89%
Total	81%	Total	88%

===== Final =====
Sunday, October 23, 10:00 am

Sheet B	1	2	3	4	5	6	7	8	Final
(Manitoba) Matt Dunstone	0	0	1	0	0	0	2	0	3
(Sweden) Team Edin 🔨	1	0	0	0	0	3	0	3	7

Player percentages
(Manitoba) Team Dunstone		(Sweden) Team Edin	
Ryan Harnden	86%	–	
Colton Lott	75%	Christoffer Sundgren	99%
B. J. Neufeld	95%	Rasmus Wranå	81%
Matt Dunstone	84%	Oskar Eriksson	93%
Total	85%	Total	91%

=== Tier 2 ===
==== Teams ====
The teams are listed as follows:

Skip	Third	Second	Lead	Alternate	Locale
Félix Asselin	Martin Crête	Émile Asselin	Jean-François Trépanier		Montreal, Quebec
Korey Dropkin	Andrew Stopera	Mark Fenner	Thomas Howell	Ben Richardson	(United States) Duluth, Minnesota
Jacques Gauthier	Sterling Middleton	Jason Ginter	Alex Horvath		Victoria, British Columbia
Kody Hartung	Tyler Hartung	Brady Scharback	Brady Kendel		Saskatoon, Saskatchewan
Grunde Buraas (Fourth)	Lukas Høstmælingen (Skip)	Magnus Lillebø	Tinius Haslev Nordbye		Oslo, Norway
Ryan Jacques	Desmond Young	Andrew Gittis	Andrew Nowell (Note: Andrew Nowell spared for Gabriel Dyck.)		Edmonton, Alberta
Kim Soo-hyuk (Fourth)	Kim Chang-min (Skip)	Seong Se-hyeon	Kim Hak-kyun		Uiseong, South Korea
Kyler Kleibrink	Joshua Kiist (Note: Joshua Kiist spared for Dustin Kalthoff.)	Chris Kennedy	Evan van Amsterdam		Calgary, Alberta
Mike McEwen	Ryan Fry	Jonathan Beuk	Brent Laing		Toronto, Ontario
John Shuster	Chris Plys	Matt Hamilton	John Landsteiner	Colin Hufman	(United States) Duluth, Minnesota
Aaron Sluchinski	Jeremy Harty	Kerr Drummond	Dylan Webster		Calgary, Alberta
Jan Hess (Fourth)	Yves Stocker (Skip)	Simon Gloor	Felix Eberhard		Zug, Switzerland
Karsten Sturmay	Kyle Doering	Kurtis Goller	Glenn Venance	J. D. Lind	Edmonton, Alberta
Johnson Tao	Jaedon Neuert	Benjamin Morin	Adam Naugler		Edmonton, Alberta
Scott Webb	Tristan Steinke	Jordan Steinke	Andrew Dunbar		Sexsmith, Alberta
Ryan Wiebe	Ty Dilello	Sean Flatt	Adam Flatt		Winnipeg, Manitoba

==== Round-robin standings ====
Final round-robin standings

Key
Teams to Playoffs
Teams to Tiebreakers

Pool A	W	L	PF	PA
(Ontario) Mike McEwen	2	2	16	19
(Alberta) Scott Webb	2	2	17	21
(Alberta) Kyler Kleibrink	1	3	12	24
(Switzerland) Yves Stocker	1	3	15	25

Pool B	W	L	PF	PA
(Norway) Lukas Høstmælingen	4	0	26	11
(Alberta) Aaron Sluchinski	4	0	23	9
(British Columbia) Jacques Gauthier	1	3	22	23
(United States) John Shuster	1	3	17	19

Pool C	W	L	PF	PA
(Quebec) Félix Asselin	4	0	33	12
(United States) Korey Dropkin	3	1	21	12
(Manitoba) Ryan Wiebe	3	1	21	14
(Alberta) Johnson Tao	2	2	19	22

Pool D	W	L	PF	PA
(Alberta) Karsten Sturmay	2	2	15	18
(Saskatchewan) Kody Hartung	2	2	19	20
(South Korea) Kim Chang-min	0	4	13	28
(Alberta) Ryan Jacques	0	4	13	28

==== Round-robin results ====
All draw times are listed in Mountain Time (UTC−06:00).

===== Draw 1 =====
Tuesday, October 18, 8:00 am

Sheet A	1	2	3	4	5	6	7	8	Final
(United States) John Shuster 🔨	0	0	1	0	0	2	0	0	3
(Alberta) Scott Webb	0	0	0	1	0	0	2	2	5

Sheet B	1	2	3	4	5	6	7	8	Final
(Alberta) Aaron Sluchinski	1	1	0	0	0	2	1	X	5
(Switzerland) Yves Stocker 🔨	0	0	0	1	0	0	0	X	1

Sheet C	1	2	3	4	5	6	7	8	Final
(Norway) Lukas Høstmælingen 🔨	2	1	0	1	1	0	4	X	9
(Alberta) Kyler Kleibrink	0	0	1	0	0	1	0	X	2

Sheet D	1	2	3	4	5	6	7	8	Final
(Ontario) Mike McEwen 🔨	1	0	1	2	0	0	0	1	5
(British Columbia) Jacques Gauthier	0	1	0	0	0	2	1	0	4

===== Draw 3 =====
Tuesday, October 18, 3:00 pm

Sheet A	1	2	3	4	5	6	7	8	Final
(United States) Korey Dropkin 🔨	2	0	0	0	2	0	0	X	4
(Alberta) Ryan Jacques	0	0	1	0	0	0	0	X	1

Sheet B	1	2	3	4	5	6	7	8	Final
(Saskatchewan) Kody Hartung	0	1	0	1	0	1	0	X	3
(Quebec) Félix Asselin 🔨	2	0	2	0	1	0	5	X	10

Sheet C	1	2	3	4	5	6	7	8	Final
(Manitoba) Ryan Wiebe	0	0	1	1	0	3	0	1	6
(South Korea) Kim Chang-min 🔨	0	1	0	0	3	0	1	0	5

Sheet D	1	2	3	4	5	6	7	8	Final
(Alberta) Karsten Sturmay	0	2	1	0	0	1	0	1	5
(Alberta) Johnson Tao 🔨	0	0	0	1	0	0	1	0	2

===== Draw 6 =====
Wednesday, October 19, 12:00 pm

Sheet A	1	2	3	4	5	6	7	8	9	Final
(Switzerland) Yves Stocker 🔨	3	0	0	0	1	0	2	0	2	8
(British Columbia) Jacques Gauthier	0	1	1	1	0	1	0	2	0	6

Sheet B	1	2	3	4	5	6	7	8	Final
(Norway) Lukas Høstmælingen	0	3	0	1	0	1	0	1	6
(Alberta) Scott Webb 🔨	1	0	0	0	1	0	2	0	4

Sheet C	1	2	3	4	5	6	7	8	Final
(Alberta) Aaron Sluchinski 🔨	2	1	1	0	0	1	0	1	6
(Ontario) Mike McEwen	0	0	0	2	1	0	1	0	4

Sheet D	1	2	3	4	5	6	7	8	Final
(United States) John Shuster 🔨	1	0	1	1	0	0	0	0	3
(Alberta) Kyler Kleibrink	0	2	0	0	1	2	1	0	6

===== Draw 8 =====
Wednesday, October 19, 8:00 pm

Sheet A	1	2	3	4	5	6	7	8	Final
(Saskatchewan) Kody Hartung 🔨	1	0	2	2	0	3	X	X	8
(Alberta) Johnson Tao	0	1	0	0	1	0	X	X	2

Sheet B	1	2	3	4	5	6	7	8	Final
(Manitoba) Ryan Wiebe 🔨	0	4	0	2	0	1	X	X	7
(Alberta) Ryan Jacques	0	0	1	0	0	0	X	X	1

Sheet C	1	2	3	4	5	6	7	8	Final
(Alberta) Karsten Sturmay	0	1	0	1	0	0	0	X	2
(Quebec) Félix Asselin 🔨	0	0	1	0	1	1	3	X	6

Sheet D	1	2	3	4	5	6	7	8	Final
(United States) Korey Dropkin 🔨	2	1	0	0	1	0	3	X	7
(South Korea) Kim Chang-min	0	0	0	1	0	2	0	X	3

===== Draw 10 =====
Thursday, October 20, 12:00 pm

Sheet A	1	2	3	4	5	6	7	8	Final
(Alberta) Karsten Sturmay	1	1	1	0	1	0	2	X	6
(Manitoba) Ryan Wiebe 🔨	0	0	0	1	0	2	0	X	3

Sheet B	1	2	3	4	5	6	7	8	Final
(South Korea) Kim Chang-min	0	1	0	0	1	1	0	X	3
(Alberta) Johnson Tao 🔨	2	0	0	2	0	0	3	X	7

Sheet C	1	2	3	4	5	6	7	8	Final
(United States) Korey Dropkin	0	0	1	0	0	1	1	0	3
(Saskatchewan) Kody Hartung 🔨	1	1	0	0	2	0	0	2	6

Sheet D	1	2	3	4	5	6	7	8	Final
(Quebec) Félix Asselin 🔨	2	0	0	2	1	0	2	2	9
(Alberta) Ryan Jacques	0	2	1	0	0	2	0	0	5

===== Draw 12 =====
Thursday, October 20, 8:00 pm

Sheet A	1	2	3	4	5	6	7	8	Final
(Alberta) Aaron Sluchinski 🔨	2	0	0	3	0	1	0	X	6
(Alberta) Kyler Kleibrink	0	1	1	0	1	0	0	X	3

Sheet B	1	2	3	4	5	6	7	8	Final
(Ontario) Mike McEwen 🔨	1	2	1	0	0	1	0	X	5
(United States) John Shuster	0	0	0	1	1	0	0	X	2

Sheet C	1	2	3	4	5	6	7	8	9	Final
(British Columbia) Jacques Gauthier	1	0	1	0	2	0	0	2	0	6
(Alberta) Scott Webb 🔨	0	0	0	3	0	3	0	0	1	7

Sheet D	1	2	3	4	5	6	7	8	Final
(Norway) Lukas Høstmælingen	0	0	1	0	0	1	0	2	4
(Switzerland) Yves Stocker 🔨	0	0	0	1	0	0	2	0	3

===== Draw 13 =====
Friday, October 21, 8:30 am

Sheet A	1	2	3	4	5	6	7	8	Final
(Quebec) Félix Asselin 🔨	2	0	2	1	3	X	X	X	8
(South Korea) Kim Chang-min	0	2	0	0	0	X	X	X	2

Sheet B	1	2	3	4	5	6	7	8	Final
(Alberta) Karsten Sturmay 🔨	1	0	0	1	0	0	X	X	2
(United States) Korey Dropkin	0	0	4	0	2	1	X	X	7

Sheet C	1	2	3	4	5	6	7	8	Final
(Alberta) Ryan Jacques	0	2	0	0	2	0	2	0	6
(Alberta) Johnson Tao 🔨	1	0	1	4	0	1	0	1	8

Sheet D	1	2	3	4	5	6	7	8	Final
(Saskatchewan) Kody Hartung 🔨	0	2	0	0	0	0	0	X	2
(Manitoba) Ryan Wiebe	2	0	0	1	1	0	1	X	5

===== Draw 15 =====
Friday, October 21, 4:00 pm

Sheet A	1	2	3	4	5	6	7	8	Final
(Norway) Lukas Høstmælingen 🔨	2	0	3	0	2	X	X	X	7
(Ontario) Mike McEwen	0	1	0	1	0	X	X	X	2

Sheet B	1	2	3	4	5	6	7	8	Final
(Alberta) Kyler Kleibrink	0	0	0	1	0	0	0	X	1
(British Columbia) Jacques Gauthier 🔨	0	2	2	0	0	1	1	X	6

Sheet C	1	2	3	4	5	6	7	8	Final
(United States) John Shuster 🔨	4	0	2	0	3	X	X	X	9
(Switzerland) Yves Stocker	0	2	0	1	0	X	X	X	3

Sheet D	1	2	3	4	5	6	7	8	Final
(Alberta) Aaron Sluchinski	0	3	1	1	1	X	X	X	6
(Alberta) Scott Webb 🔨	1	0	0	0	0	X	X	X	1

==== Tiebreakers ====
Saturday, October 22, 8:00 am

Sheet C	1	2	3	4	5	6	7	8	Final
(Alberta) Scott Webb 🔨	2	0	1	0	1	0	1	X	5
(Alberta) Karsten Sturmay	0	1	0	3	0	3	0	X	7

Sheet D	1	2	3	4	5	6	7	8	Final
(Saskatchewan) Kody Hartung 🔨	2	0	0	1	0	1	0	1	5
(Alberta) Johnson Tao	0	0	1	0	1	0	2	0	4

==== Playoffs ====
Quarterfinals
1	(Quebec) Félix Asselin	8
8	(Alberta) Karsten Sturmay	3
4	(United States) Korey Dropkin	3
5	(Manitoba) Ryan Wiebe	2
2	(Norway) Lukas Høstmælingen	6
7	(Saskatchewan) Kody Hartung	8
3	(Alberta) Aaron Sluchinski	6
6	(Ontario) Mike McEwen	5

Semifinals
1	(Quebec) Félix Asselin	2
4	(United States) Korey Dropkin	5
7	(Saskatchewan) Kody Hartung	2
3	(Alberta) Aaron Sluchinski	5

Final
4	(United States) Korey Dropkin	6
3	(Alberta) Aaron Sluchinski	3

===== Quarterfinals =====
Saturday, October 22, 12:00 pm

Sheet A	1	2	3	4	5	6	7	8	Final
(United States) Korey Dropkin 🔨	0	0	0	0	2	0	0	1	3
(Manitoba) Ryan Wiebe	0	1	0	0	0	0	1	0	2

Sheet B	1	2	3	4	5	6	7	8	Final
(Alberta) Aaron Sluchinski 🔨	2	0	2	0	0	0	0	2	6
(Ontario) Mike McEwen	0	2	0	1	0	1	1	0	5

Sheet C	1	2	3	4	5	6	7	8	9	Final
(Norway) Lukas Høstmælingen 🔨	3	0	0	0	1	0	1	1	0	6
(Saskatchewan) Kody Hartung	0	2	0	1	0	3	0	0	2	8

Sheet D	1	2	3	4	5	6	7	8	Final
(Quebec) Félix Asselin 🔨	2	0	4	0	1	1	X	X	8
(Alberta) Karsten Sturmay	0	2	0	1	0	0	X	X	3

===== Semifinals =====
Saturday, October 22, 8:00 pm

Sheet A	1	2	3	4	5	6	7	8	Final
(Saskatchewan) Kody Hartung	0	2	0	0	0	0	0	X	2
(Alberta) Aaron Sluchinski 🔨	0	0	2	1	0	1	1	X	5

Sheet C	1	2	3	4	5	6	7	8	Final
(Quebec) Félix Asselin 🔨	1	0	0	0	0	0	1	0	2
(United States) Korey Dropkin	0	0	0	0	3	1	0	1	5

===== Final =====
Sunday, October 23, 10:00 am

Sheet A	1	2	3	4	5	6	7	8	Final
(United States) Korey Dropkin	0	0	2	0	1	1	0	2	6
(Alberta) Aaron Sluchinski 🔨	1	0	0	1	0	0	1	0	3

Player percentages
(United States) Team Dropkin		(Alberta) Team Sluchinski	
Thomas Howell	80%	Dylan Webster	86%
Mark Fenner	77%	Kerr Drummond	86%
Andrew Stopera	92%	Jeremy Harty	77%
Korey Dropkin	92%	Aaron Sluchinski	86%
Total	85%	Total	84%

== Women ==
=== Tier 1 ===
==== Teams ====
The teams are listed as follows:

Skip	Third	Second	Lead	Alternate	Locale
Chelsea Carey	Jolene Campbell	Liz Fyfe	Rachel Erickson	Jamie Sinclair	Winnipeg, Manitoba
Hollie Duncan	Julie Tippin (Note: Julie Tippin spared for Megan Balsdon.)	Rachelle Strybosch	Tess Bobbie		Woodstock, Ontario
Kerri Einarson	Val Sweeting	Shannon Birchard	Briane Harris		Gimli, Manitoba
Rachel Homan (Fourth)	Tracy Fleury (Skip)	Emma Miskew	Sarah Wilkes		Ottawa, Ontario
Satsuki Fujisawa	Chinami Yoshida	Yumi Suzuki	Yurika Yoshida		Kitami, Japan
Gim Eun-ji	Kim Min-ji	Kim Su-ji	Seol Ye-eun	Seol Ye-ji	Uijeongbu, South Korea
Anna Hasselborg	Agnes Knochenhauer	Sofia Mabergs	Johanna Heldin (Note: Johanna Heldin spared for Sara McManus who was on maternity leave. She played lead while Agnes Knochenhauer and Sofia Mabergs each moved up the lineup one position.)		Sundbyberg, Sweden
Daniela Jentsch	Emira Abbes	Pia-Lisa Schöll (Note: Pia-Lisa Schöll spared for Mia Höhne.)	Analena Jentsch		Füssen, Germany
Jennifer Jones	Karlee Burgess	Mackenzie Zacharias	Emily Zacharias	Lauren Lenentine	Winnipeg, Manitoba
Selina Witschonke (Fourth)	Elena Mathis	Raphaela Keiser (Skip)	Marina Lörtscher		St. Moritz, Switzerland
Kim Eun-jung	Kim Kyeong-ae	Kim Cho-hi	Kim Seon-yeong	Kim Yeong-mi	Gangneung, South Korea
Kaitlyn Lawes	Selena Njegovan	Jocelyn Peterman	Kristin MacCuish		Winnipeg, Manitoba
Tabitha Peterson	Cory Thiesse	Becca Hamilton	Tara Peterson		(United States) Chaska, Minnesota
Casey Scheidegger	Kate Hogan	Jessie Haughian	Taylor McDonald		Lethbridge, Alberta
Alina Pätz (Fourth)	Silvana Tirinzoni (Skip)	Carole Howald	Briar Schwaller-Hürlimann		Aarau, Switzerland
Isabella Wranå	Almida de Val	Linda Stenlund	Maria Larsson		Sundbyberg, Sweden

==== Round-robin standings ====
Final round-robin standings

Key
Teams to Playoffs
Teams to Tiebreakers

Pool A	W	L	PF	PA
(Switzerland) Silvana Tirinzoni	4	0	28	18
(Manitoba) Kaitlyn Lawes	3	1	27	15
(Switzerland) Raphaela Keiser	2	2	16	20
(Alberta) Casey Scheidegger	2	2	18	25

Pool D	W	L	PF	PA
(South Korea) Kim Eun-jung	3	1	24	14
(Manitoba) Kerri Einarson	2	2	27	24
(Manitoba) Chelsea Carey	0	4	13	26
(United States) Tabitha Peterson	0	4	14	25

Pool B	W	L	PF	PA
(Sweden) Anna Hasselborg	3	1	23	18
(Ontario) Team Homan	3	1	23	19
(Ontario) Hollie Duncan	2	2	24	24
(Sweden) Isabella Wranå	2	2	20	26

Pool C	W	L	PF	PA
(South Korea) Gim Eun-ji	2	2	23	19
(Japan) Satsuki Fujisawa	2	2	27	22
(Germany) Daniela Jentsch	1	3	17	23
(Manitoba) Jennifer Jones	1	3	20	26

==== Round-robin results ====
All draw times are listed in Mountain Time (UTC−06:00).

===== Draw 2 =====
Tuesday, October 18, 11:30 am

Sheet A	1	2	3	4	5	6	7	8	Final
(Manitoba) Kaitlyn Lawes 🔨	2	0	1	0	1	1	1	X	6
(United States) Tabitha Peterson	0	1	0	2	0	0	0	X	3

Sheet B	1	2	3	4	5	6	7	8	Final
(Switzerland) Silvana Tirinzoni 🔨	0	1	0	0	2	0	2	X	5
(Manitoba) Chelsea Carey	0	0	1	1	0	1	0	X	3

Sheet C	1	2	3	4	5	6	7	8	Final
(Manitoba) Kerri Einarson	1	1	0	2	0	0	3	X	7
(Switzerland) Raphaela Keiser 🔨	0	0	2	0	0	1	0	X	3

Sheet D	1	2	3	4	5	6	7	8	Final
(Alberta) Casey Scheidegger	0	1	0	1	0	0	X	X	2
(South Korea) Kim Eun-jung 🔨	1	0	2	0	3	2	X	X	8

===== Draw 4 =====
Tuesday, October 18, 6:30 pm

Sheet A	1	2	3	4	5	6	7	8	Final
(Japan) Satsuki Fujisawa	0	1	0	2	0	3	0	X	6
(Ontario) Hollie Duncan 🔨	3	0	3	0	2	0	1	X	9

Sheet B	1	2	3	4	5	6	7	8	Final
(Manitoba) Jennifer Jones	0	1	1	1	0	2	0	0	5
(Sweden) Isabella Wranå 🔨	2	0	0	0	1	0	2	1	6

Sheet C	1	2	3	4	5	6	7	8	Final
(Sweden) Anna Hasselborg 🔨	0	1	0	3	0	0	2	X	6
(Germany) Daniela Jentsch	0	0	1	0	0	1	0	X	2

Sheet D	1	2	3	4	5	6	7	8	Final
(Ontario) Team Homan 🔨	2	0	0	1	0	0	0	2	5
(South Korea) Gim Eun-ji	0	1	0	0	1	1	1	0	4

===== Draw 5 =====
Wednesday, October 19, 8:30 am

Sheet A	1	2	3	4	5	6	7	8	Final
(South Korea) Kim Eun-jung 🔨	0	0	1	1	2	0	1	X	5
(Switzerland) Raphaela Keiser	0	0	0	0	0	1	0	X	1

Sheet B	1	2	3	4	5	6	7	8	Final
(Alberta) Casey Scheidegger	0	1	0	2	0	2	0	X	5
(Manitoba) Kerri Einarson 🔨	2	0	2	0	2	0	2	X	8

Sheet C	1	2	3	4	5	6	7	8	Final
(Manitoba) Kaitlyn Lawes 🔨	1	2	0	0	3	0	3	X	9
(Manitoba) Chelsea Carey	0	0	1	0	0	1	0	X	2

Sheet D	1	2	3	4	5	6	7	8	Final
(Switzerland) Silvana Tirinzoni 🔨	0	3	0	3	2	X	X	X	8
(United States) Tabitha Peterson	0	0	2	0	0	X	X	X	2

===== Draw 7 =====
Wednesday, October 19, 4:00 pm

Sheet A	1	2	3	4	5	6	7	8	Final
(Ontario) Team Homan	0	0	3	0	1	0	2	X	6
(Germany) Daniela Jentsch 🔨	0	1	0	1	0	1	0	X	3

Sheet B	1	2	3	4	5	6	7	8	Final
(Sweden) Anna Hasselborg 🔨	1	0	1	0	0	1	1	1	5
(South Korea) Gim Eun-ji	0	2	0	1	0	0	0	0	3

Sheet C	1	2	3	4	5	6	7	8	Final
(Japan) Satsuki Fujisawa	0	2	1	3	0	2	X	X	8
(Sweden) Isabella Wranå 🔨	1	0	0	0	2	0	X	X	3

Sheet D	1	2	3	4	5	6	7	8	Final
(Manitoba) Jennifer Jones	0	1	0	1	0	1	0	X	3
(Ontario) Hollie Duncan 🔨	0	0	1	0	3	0	2	X	6

===== Draw 9 =====
Thursday, October 20, 8:30 am

Sheet A	1	2	3	4	5	6	7	8	Final
(South Korea) Gim Eun-ji 🔨	2	0	0	2	0	1	2	1	8
(Sweden) Isabella Wranå	0	1	0	0	3	0	0	0	4

Sheet B	1	2	3	4	5	6	7	8	Final
(Germany) Daniela Jentsch 🔨	0	2	0	1	0	2	2	X	7
(Ontario) Hollie Duncan	1	0	1	0	2	0	0	X	4

Sheet C	1	2	3	4	5	6	7	8	Final
(Ontario) Team Homan 🔨	1	0	2	1	3	0	X	X	7
(Manitoba) Jennifer Jones	0	2	0	0	0	1	X	X	3

Sheet D	1	2	3	4	5	6	7	8	Final
(Sweden) Anna Hasselborg 🔨	0	1	0	2	0	0	1	1	5
(Japan) Satsuki Fujisawa	1	0	1	0	0	2	0	0	4

===== Draw 11 =====
Thursday, October 20, 4:00 pm

Sheet A	1	2	3	4	5	6	7	8	Final
(Manitoba) Kerri Einarson	2	0	0	0	3	0	1	0	6
(Switzerland) Silvana Tirinzoni 🔨	0	0	1	1	0	3	0	2	7

Sheet B	1	2	3	4	5	6	7	8	Final
(Manitoba) Kaitlyn Lawes	0	1	0	0	0	1	0	1	3
(South Korea) Kim Eun-jung 🔨	1	0	2	0	0	0	1	0	4

Sheet C	1	2	3	4	5	6	7	8	Final
(Alberta) Casey Scheidegger	0	1	1	0	2	0	2	0	6
(United States) Tabitha Peterson 🔨	1	0	0	2	0	1	0	1	5

Sheet D	1	2	3	4	5	6	7	8	Final
(Manitoba) Chelsea Carey 🔨	0	2	0	0	2	0	0	0	4
(Switzerland) Raphaela Keiser	1	0	1	1	0	1	2	1	7

===== Draw 14 =====
Friday, October 21, 12:00 pm

Sheet A	1	2	3	4	5	6	7	8	Final
(Sweden) Anna Hasselborg	0	1	1	0	2	0	3	0	7
(Manitoba) Jennifer Jones 🔨	2	0	0	2	0	4	0	1	9

Sheet B	1	2	3	4	5	6	7	8	Final
(Japan) Satsuki Fujisawa 🔨	2	0	0	2	3	0	2	X	9
(Ontario) Team Homan	0	3	0	0	0	2	0	X	5

Sheet C	1	2	3	4	5	6	7	8	Final
(South Korea) Gim Eun-ji	0	0	0	5	0	3	0	X	8
(Ontario) Hollie Duncan 🔨	2	0	1	0	1	0	1	X	5

Sheet D	1	2	3	4	5	6	7	8	Final
(Sweden) Isabella Wranå	0	1	0	1	0	2	0	3	7
(Germany) Daniela Jentsch 🔨	1	0	1	0	1	0	2	0	5

===== Draw 16 =====
Friday, October 21, 8:00 pm

Sheet A	1	2	3	4	5	6	7	8	Final
(Alberta) Casey Scheidegger 🔨	2	0	1	1	0	1	0	0	5
(Manitoba) Chelsea Carey	0	1	0	0	1	0	1	1	4

Sheet B	1	2	3	4	5	6	7	8	Final
(United States) Tabitha Peterson	0	0	0	0	1	1	0	2	4
(Switzerland) Raphaela Keiser 🔨	0	3	1	0	0	0	1	0	5

Sheet C	1	2	3	4	5	6	7	8	9	Final
(Switzerland) Silvana Tirinzoni	0	0	2	0	2	0	3	0	1	8
(South Korea) Kim Eun-jung 🔨	1	1	0	2	0	1	0	2	0	7

Sheet D	1	2	3	4	5	6	7	8	Final
(Manitoba) Kerri Einarson 🔨	2	0	1	0	2	0	1	0	6
(Manitoba) Kaitlyn Lawes	0	3	0	3	0	1	0	2	9

==== Tiebreakers ====
Saturday, October 22, 8:00 am

Sheet A	1	2	3	4	5	6	7	8	Final
(Switzerland) Raphaela Keiser 🔨	0	0	0	1	0	0	1	X	2
(South Korea) Gim Eun-ji	1	0	0	0	2	1	0	X	4

Player percentages
(Switzerland) Team Keiser		(South Korea) Team Gim	
Marina Lörtscher	75%	Seol Ye-eun	78%
Raphaela Keiser	75%	Kim Su-ji	81%
Elena Mathis	56%	Kim Min-ji	69%
Selina Witschonke	67%	Gim Eun-ji	82%
Total	68%	Total	77%

Sheet B	1	2	3	4	5	6	7	8	Final
(Ontario) Hollie Duncan	0	1	0	2	0	1	0	0	4
(Sweden) Isabella Wranå 🔨	2	0	1	0	2	0	1	1	7

Player percentages
(Ontario) Team Duncan		(Sweden) Team Wranå	
Tess Guyatt	91%	Maria Larsson	94%
Rachelle Strybosch	68%	Linda Stenlund	73%
Julie Tippin	78%	Almida de Val	81%
Hollie Duncan	64%	Isabella Wranå	84%
Total	75%	Total	83%

Sheet C	1	2	3	4	5	6	7	8	Final
(Manitoba) Kerri Einarson 🔨	0	0	2	0	0	2	0	2	6
(Japan) Satsuki Fujisawa	0	3	0	0	1	0	1	0	5

Player percentages
(Manitoba) Team Einarson		(Japan) Team Fujisawa	
Briane Harris	84%	Yurika Yoshida	83%
Shannon Birchard	80%	Yumi Suzuki	80%
Val Sweeting	75%	Chinami Yoshida	66%
Kerri Einarson	83%	Satsuki Fujisawa	83%
Total	81%	Total	78%

==== Playoffs ====
Quarterfinals
1	(Switzerland) Silvana Tirinzoni	2
8	(Sweden) Isabella Wranå	9
4	(Ontario) Team Homan	9
5	(Manitoba) Kaitlyn Lawes	6
2	(South Korea) Kim Eun-jung	6
7	(South Korea) Gim Eun-ji	7
3	(Sweden) Anna Hasselborg	5
6	(Manitoba) Kerri Einarson	6

Semifinals
8	(Sweden) Isabella Wranå	6
4	(Ontario) Team Homan	10
7	(South Korea) Gim Eun-ji	3
6	(Manitoba) Kerri Einarson	4

Final
4	(Ontario) Team Homan	8
6	(Manitoba) Kerri Einarson	4

===== Quarterfinals =====
Saturday, October 22, 4:00 pm

Sheet A	1	2	3	4	5	6	7	8	Final
(Ontario) Team Homan	1	0	0	2	0	2	0	4	9
(Manitoba) Kaitlyn Lawes 🔨	0	1	1	0	3	0	1	0	6

Player percentages
(Ontario) Team Homan		(Manitoba) Team Lawes	
Sarah Wilkes	97%	Kristin MacCuish	77%
Emma Miskew	64%	Jocelyn Peterman	72%
Tracy Fleury	78%	Selena Njegovan	72%
Rachel Homan	80%	Kaitlyn Lawes	59%
Total	80%	Total	70%

Sheet B	1	2	3	4	5	6	7	8	Final
(Sweden) Anna Hasselborg 🔨	2	0	2	0	0	1	0	0	5
(Manitoba) Kerri Einarson	0	2	0	1	1	0	1	1	6

Player percentages
(Sweden) Team Hasselborg		(Manitoba) Team Einarson	
Johanna Heldin	78%	Briane Harris	84%
Sofia Mabergs	89%	Shannon Birchard	67%
Agnes Knochenhauer	83%	Val Sweeting	86%
Anna Hasselborg	77%	Kerri Einarson	75%
Total	82%	Total	78%

Sheet C	1	2	3	4	5	6	7	8	Final
(Switzerland) Silvana Tirinzoni 🔨	0	1	0	0	1	0	0	X	2
(Sweden) Isabella Wranå	1	0	2	1	0	2	3	X	9

Player percentages
(Switzerland) Team Tirinzoni		(Sweden) Team Wranå	
Briar Schwaller-Hürlimann	82%	Maria Larsson	77%
Carole Howald	73%	Linda Stenlund	79%
Silvana Tirinzoni	77%	Almida de Val	80%
Alina Pätz	70%	Isabella Wranå	86%
Total	75%	Total	80%

Sheet D	1	2	3	4	5	6	7	8	Final
(South Korea) Kim Eun-jung 🔨	1	0	3	0	0	1	1	0	6
(South Korea) Gim Eun-ji	0	2	0	3	0	0	0	2	7

Player percentages
(South Korea) Team Kim		(South Korea) Team Gim	
Kim Seon-yeong	88%	Seol Ye-eun	77%
Kim Cho-hi	73%	Kim Su-ji	81%
Kim Kyeong-ae	73%	Kim Min-ji	78%
Kim Eun-jung	73%	Gim Eun-ji	83%
Total	77%	Total	80%

===== Semifinals =====
Saturday, October 22, 8:00 pm

Sheet B	1	2	3	4	5	6	7	8	Final
(Sweden) Isabella Wranå	1	0	1	0	0	3	1	0	6
(Ontario) Team Homan 🔨	0	4	0	3	0	0	0	3	10

Player percentages
(Sweden) Team Wranå		(Ontario) Team Homan	
Maria Larsson	78%	Sarah Wilkes	84%
Linda Stenlund	67%	Emma Miskew	77%
Almida de Val	81%	Tracy Fleury	75%
Isabella Wranå	78%	Rachel Homan	71%
Total	76%	Total	77%

Sheet C	1	2	3	4	5	6	7	8	Final
(South Korea) Gim Eun-ji	0	1	0	1	0	1	0	0	3
(Manitoba) Kerri Einarson 🔨	1	0	1	0	1	0	0	1	4

Player percentages
(South Korea) Team Gim		(Manitoba) Team Einarson	
Seol Ye-eun	83%	Briane Harris	88%
Kim Su-ji	81%	Shannon Birchard	83%
Kim Min-ji	91%	Val Sweeting	61%
Gim Eun-ji	86%	Kerri Einarson	75%
Total	85%	Total	77%

===== Final =====
Sunday, October 23, 2:00 pm

Sheet B	1	2	3	4	5	6	7	8	Final
(Ontario) Team Homan 🔨	2	0	3	0	0	2	1	X	8
(Manitoba) Kerri Einarson	0	3	0	1	0	0	0	X	4

Player percentages
(Ontario) Team Homan		(Manitoba) Team Einarson	
Sarah Wilkes	96%	Briane Harris	82%
Emma Miskew	91%	Shannon Birchard	80%
Tracy Fleury	75%	Val Sweeting	77%
Rachel Homan	84%	Kerri Einarson	68%
Total	87%	Total	77%

=== Tier 2 ===
==== Teams ====
The teams are listed as follows:

Skip	Third	Second	Lead	Alternate	Locale
Christina Black	Jenn Baxter	Karlee Jones	Shelley Barker		Halifax, Nova Scotia
Elysa Crough	Quinn Prodaniuk	Kim Bonneau	Julianna Mackenzie		Edmonton, Alberta
Madeleine Dupont	Mathilde Halse	Denise Dupont	My Larsen	Jasmin Lander	Hvidovre, Denmark
Beth Farmer	Hailey Duff	Kirstin Bousie	Amy MacDonald		Stirling, Scotland
Jo-Ann Rizzo (Fourth)	Sarah Koltun	Margot Flemming	Kerry Galusha (Skip)		Yellowknife, Northwest Territories
Clancy Grandy	Kayla MacMillan	Lindsay Dubue	Sarah Loken		Vancouver, British Columbia
Serena Gray-Withers	Catherine Clifford	Brianna Cullen	Zoe Cinnamon		Edmonton, Alberta
Jessie Hunkin	Kristen Streifel	Becca Hebert	Dayna Demers		Spruce Grove, Alberta
Andrea Kelly	Sylvie Quillian	Jill Brothers	Katie Forward		Fredericton, New Brunswick
Nancy Martin	Lindsay Bertsch	Jennifer Armstrong	Krysten Karwacki		Saskatoon, Saskatchewan
Krista McCarville	Kendra Lilly	Ashley Sippala	Sarah Potts		Thunder Bay, Ontario
Kristie Moore	Susan O'Connor	Janais DeJong	Valerie Ekelund		Sexsmith, Alberta
Kelsey Rocque	Danielle Schmiemann	Dana Ferguson	Rachelle Brown		Edmonton, Alberta
Kayla Skrlik	Geri-Lynn Ramsay	Brittany Tran	Ashton Skrlik		Calgary, Alberta
Selena Sturmay	Abby Marks	Kate Goodhelpsen	Paige Papley		Edmonton, Alberta
Kristy Watling	Hailey McFarlane	Emilie Rafsnon	Sarah Pyke		Winnipeg, Manitoba

==== Round-robin standings ====
Final round-robin standings

Key
Teams to Playoffs
Teams to Tiebreakers

Pool A	W	L	PF	PA
(Alberta) Jessie Hunkin	3	1	23	17
(British Columbia) Clancy Grandy	3	1	26	13
(Alberta) Kristie Moore	1	3	15	30
(Ontario) Krista McCarville	1	3	24	29

Pool B	W	L	PF	PA
(New Brunswick) Andrea Kelly	3	1	30	22
(Alberta) Kayla Skrlik	2	2	19	21
(Denmark) Madeleine Dupont	2	2	21	21
(Alberta) Selena Sturmay	1	3	19	24

Pool C	W	L	PF	PA
(Alberta) Elysa Crough	3	1	32	20
(Northwest Territories) Kerry Galusha	2	2	20	23
(Manitoba) Kristy Watling	2	2	19	25
(Scotland) Beth Farmer	0	4	12	35

Pool D	W	L	PF	PA
(Nova Scotia) Christina Black	4	0	34	15
(Alberta) Kelsey Rocque	3	1	23	23
(Alberta) Serena Gray-Withers	1	3	23	24
(Saskatchewan) Nancy Martin	1	3	23	21

==== Round-robin results ====
All draw times are listed in Mountain Time (UTC−06:00).

===== Draw 2 =====
Tuesday, October 18, 11:30 am

Sheet A	1	2	3	4	5	6	7	8	Final
(Alberta) Selena Sturmay	0	1	0	0	0	1	0	3	5
(Alberta) Kristie Moore 🔨	1	0	1	1	1	0	2	0	6

Sheet B	1	2	3	4	5	6	7	8	Final
(British Columbia) Clancy Grandy	0	0	2	0	1	1	2	0	6
(New Brunswick) Andrea Kelly 🔨	0	4	0	2	0	0	0	1	7

Sheet C	1	2	3	4	5	6	7	8	Final
(Denmark) Madeleine Dupont 🔨	0	1	0	0	3	2	0	X	6
(Alberta) Jessie Hunkin	3	0	0	1	0	0	1	X	5

Sheet D	1	2	3	4	5	6	7	8	Final
(Ontario) Krista McCarville	0	1	0	0	0	2	1	1	5
(Alberta) Kayla Skrlik 🔨	1	0	2	3	1	0	0	0	7

===== Draw 4 =====
Tuesday, October 18, 6:30 pm

Sheet A	1	2	3	4	5	6	7	8	Final
(Alberta) Serena Gray-Withers	0	1	0	0	0	1	1	X	3
(Northwest Territories) Kerry Galusha 🔨	1	0	2	0	2	0	0	X	5

Sheet B	1	2	3	4	5	6	7	8	Final
(Nova Scotia) Christina Black	3	3	0	0	1	4	X	X	11
(Scotland) Beth Farmer 🔨	0	0	1	3	0	0	X	X	4

Sheet C	1	2	3	4	5	6	7	8	9	Final
(Manitoba) Kristy Watling	1	0	1	1	0	1	0	1	1	6
(Saskatchewan) Nancy Martin 🔨	0	2	0	0	2	0	1	0	0	5

Sheet D	1	2	3	4	5	6	7	8	Final
(Alberta) Kelsey Rocque 🔨	0	0	0	2	0	0	X	X	2
(Alberta) Elysa Crough	2	1	4	0	1	4	X	X	12

===== Draw 5 =====
Wednesday, October 19, 8:30 am

Sheet A	1	2	3	4	5	6	7	8	Final
(British Columbia) Clancy Grandy 🔨	0	0	2	0	0	1	1	2	6
(Alberta) Kayla Skrlik	0	1	0	0	1	0	0	0	2

Sheet B	1	2	3	4	5	6	7	8	Final
(Denmark) Madeleine Dupont 🔨	1	0	2	0	1	4	X	X	8
(Alberta) Kristie Moore	0	1	0	1	0	0	X	X	2

Sheet C	1	2	3	4	5	6	7	8	9	Final
(Ontario) Krista McCarville	0	0	1	0	2	2	0	2	0	7
(New Brunswick) Andrea Kelly 🔨	0	1	0	3	0	0	3	0	1	8

Sheet D	1	2	3	4	5	6	7	8	Final
(Alberta) Selena Sturmay	0	1	0	0	1	0	1	0	3
(Alberta) Jessie Hunkin 🔨	1	0	1	2	0	1	0	1	6

===== Draw 7 =====
Wednesday, October 19, 4:00 pm

Sheet A	1	2	3	4	5	6	7	8	Final
(Nova Scotia) Christina Black	0	2	0	1	0	2	0	3	8
(Alberta) Elysa Crough 🔨	2	0	0	0	2	0	0	0	4

Sheet B	1	2	3	4	5	6	7	8	Final
(Alberta) Serena Gray-Withers 🔨	2	0	0	2	0	0	1	0	5
(Manitoba) Kristy Watling	0	0	1	0	1	3	0	2	7

Sheet C	1	2	3	4	5	6	7	8	Final
(Alberta) Kelsey Rocque 🔨	0	2	0	0	1	0	2	X	5
(Scotland) Beth Farmer	0	0	0	1	0	1	0	X	2

Sheet D	1	2	3	4	5	6	7	8	Final
(Northwest Territories) Kerry Galusha 🔨	0	1	0	1	2	0	0	1	5
(Saskatchewan) Nancy Martin	0	0	1	0	0	1	2	0	4

===== Draw 9 =====
Thursday, October 20, 8:30 am

Sheet A	1	2	3	4	5	6	7	8	Final
(Alberta) Kelsey Rocque 🔨	2	0	2	0	2	1	1	X	8
(Manitoba) Kristy Watling	0	3	0	1	0	0	0	X	4

Sheet B	1	2	3	4	5	6	7	8	Final
(Saskatchewan) Nancy Martin	0	4	0	1	0	0	0	X	5
(Alberta) Elysa Crough 🔨	2	0	2	0	0	3	1	X	8

Sheet C	1	2	3	4	5	6	7	8	Final
(Northwest Territories) Kerry Galusha 🔨	0	1	0	1	1	0	2	X	5
(Nova Scotia) Christina Black	3	0	2	0	0	3	0	X	8

Sheet D	1	2	3	4	5	6	7	8	Final
(Scotland) Beth Farmer	0	0	0	1	0	3	0	X	4
(Alberta) Serena Gray-Withers 🔨	2	2	1	0	2	0	3	X	10

===== Draw 11 =====
Thursday, October 20, 4:00 pm

Sheet A	1	2	3	4	5	6	7	8	Final
(Ontario) Krista McCarville 🔨	2	0	0	3	0	1	1	X	7
(Denmark) Madeleine Dupont	0	2	1	0	1	0	0	X	4

Sheet B	1	2	3	4	5	6	7	8	Final
(Alberta) Jessie Hunkin 🔨	0	0	1	1	1	0	2	X	5
(Alberta) Kayla Skrlik	0	0	0	0	0	2	0	X	2

Sheet C	1	2	3	4	5	6	7	8	Final
(Alberta) Selena Sturmay	0	0	1	0	0	0	X	X	1
(British Columbia) Clancy Grandy 🔨	1	1	0	1	2	2	X	X	7

Sheet D	1	2	3	4	5	6	7	8	Final
(New Brunswick) Andrea Kelly	0	3	0	1	4	1	X	X	9
(Alberta) Kristie Moore 🔨	0	0	2	0	0	0	X	X	2

===== Draw 14 =====
Friday, October 21, 12:00 pm

Sheet A	1	2	3	4	5	6	7	8	Final
(Saskatchewan) Nancy Martin 🔨	1	0	3	0	2	0	3	X	9
(Scotland) Beth Farmer	0	1	0	0	0	1	0	X	2

Sheet B	1	2	3	4	5	6	7	8	Final
(Northwest Territories) Kerry Galusha	0	2	0	1	0	0	2	0	5
(Alberta) Kelsey Rocque 🔨	1	0	2	0	1	2	0	2	8

Sheet C	1	2	3	4	5	6	7	8	Final
(Alberta) Serena Gray-Withers	0	0	3	0	2	0	0	X	5
(Alberta) Elysa Crough 🔨	1	1	0	3	0	2	1	X	8

Sheet D	1	2	3	4	5	6	7	8	Final
(Manitoba) Kristy Watling	0	1	0	0	1	0	X	X	2
(Nova Scotia) Christina Black 🔨	2	0	2	1	0	2	X	X	7

===== Draw 16 =====
Friday, October 21, 8:00 pm

Sheet A	1	2	3	4	5	6	7	8	9	Final
(Alberta) Jessie Hunkin	1	0	3	0	1	0	1	0	1	7
(New Brunswick) Andrea Kelly 🔨	0	1	0	1	0	2	0	2	0	6

Sheet B	1	2	3	4	5	6	7	8	Final
(Ontario) Krista McCarville	0	3	0	1	0	1	0	X	5
(Alberta) Selena Sturmay 🔨	1	0	2	0	5	0	2	X	10

Sheet C	1	2	3	4	5	6	7	8	Final
(Alberta) Kayla Skrlik 🔨	4	0	2	0	0	2	0	X	8
(Alberta) Kristie Moore	0	1	0	1	2	0	1	X	5

Sheet D	1	2	3	4	5	6	7	8	Final
(British Columbia) Clancy Grandy 🔨	0	0	3	0	3	0	1	X	7
(Denmark) Madeleine Dupont	0	1	0	1	0	1	0	X	3

==== Tiebreakers ====
Saturday, October 22, 8:00 am

Sheet A	1	2	3	4	5	6	7	8	Final
(Northwest Territories) Kerry Galusha	1	1	0	3	0	1	0	2	8
(Denmark) Madeleine Dupont 🔨	0	0	2	0	1	0	2	0	5

Sheet B	1	2	3	4	5	6	7	8	Final
(Alberta) Kayla Skrlik	0	0	2	0	0	2	0	0	4
(Manitoba) Kristy Watling 🔨	0	1	0	2	3	0	1	1	8

==== Playoffs ====
Quarterfinals
1	(Nova Scotia) Christina Black	8
8	(Manitoba) Kristy Watling	6
4	(Alberta) Elysa Crough	2
5	(Alberta) Jessie Hunkin	9
2	(New Brunswick) Andrea Kelly	5
7	(Northwest Territories) Kerry Galusha	6
3	(Alberta) Kelsey Rocque	4
6	(British Columbia) Clancy Grandy	7

Semifinals
1	(Nova Scotia) Christina Black	4
5	(Alberta) Jessie Hunkin	5
7	(Northwest Territories) Kerry Galusha	5
6	(British Columbia) Clancy Grandy	8

Final
5	(Alberta) Jessie Hunkin	2
6	(British Columbia) Clancy Grandy	8

===== Quarterfinals =====
Saturday, October 22, 4:00 pm

Sheet A	1	2	3	4	5	6	7	8	Final
(Nova Scotia) Christina Black 🔨	3	0	3	0	0	2	0	X	8
(Manitoba) Kristy Watling	0	2	0	2	1	0	1	X	6

Sheet B	1	2	3	4	5	6	7	8	Final
(Alberta) Elysa Crough 🔨	1	0	0	0	0	1	X	X	2
(Alberta) Jessie Hunkin	0	1	2	2	4	0	X	X	9

Sheet C	1	2	3	4	5	6	7	8	Final
(Alberta) Kelsey Rocque	0	0	1	0	1	0	2	X	4
(British Columbia) Clancy Grandy 🔨	1	1	0	2	0	3	0	X	7

Sheet D	1	2	3	4	5	6	7	8	9	Final
(New Brunswick) Andrea Kelly	1	1	1	0	0	0	2	0	0	5
(Northwest Territories) Kerry Galusha 🔨	0	0	0	2	1	1	0	1	1	6

===== Semifinals =====
Saturday, October 22, 8:00 pm

Sheet B	1	2	3	4	5	6	7	8	Final
(Northwest Territories) Kerry Galusha	0	0	0	3	1	0	1	X	5
(British Columbia) Clancy Grandy 🔨	2	1	3	0	0	2	0	X	8

Sheet D	1	2	3	4	5	6	7	8	Final
(Nova Scotia) Christina Black 🔨	0	1	0	1	0	1	1	0	4
(Alberta) Jessie Hunkin	2	0	1	0	1	0	0	1	5

===== Final =====
Sunday, October 23, 2:00 pm

Sheet A	1	2	3	4	5	6	7	8	Final
(Alberta) Jessie Hunkin	0	0	1	0	1	0	X	X	2
(British Columbia) Clancy Grandy 🔨	2	2	0	2	0	2	X	X	8

Player percentages
(Alberta) Team Hunkin		(British Columbia) Team Grandy	
Dayna Demers	81%	Sarah Loken	77%
Becca Hebert	69%	Lindsay Dubue	96%
Kristen Streifel	65%	Kayla MacMillan	71%
Jessie Hunkin	54%	Clancy Grandy	94%
Total	67%	Total	84%
