= 2024 Alberta Scotties Tournament of Hearts =

Canadian provincial women's curling championship

2024 Sentinel Storage Alberta Scotties Tournament of Hearts
- Host city: St. Paul, Alberta
- Arena: Clancy Richard Arena
- Dates: January 24-28
- Winner: Team Sturmay
- Curling club: Saville Community SC, Edmonton
- Skip: Selena Sturmay
- Third: Danielle Schmiemann
- Second: Dezaray Hawes
- Lead: Paige Papley
- Coach: Ted Appelman
- Finalist: Kayla Skrlik

The 2024 Sentinel Storage Alberta Scotties Tournament of Hearts, the provincial women's curling championship for Alberta, was held from January 24 to 28 at the Clancy Richard Arena in St. Paul, Alberta. The winning Selena Sturmay rink represented Alberta on home soil at the 2024 Scotties Tournament of Hearts in Calgary.

== Qualification Process ==
Qualification method	Berths	Qualifying teams
CTRS Leaders	3	Selena Sturmay; Jessie Hunkin; Serena Gray-Withers
Excel Points Leader	1	Kayla Skrlik
Westlock Qualifier	2	Nicky Kaufman; Michelle Hartwell
Last Chance Airdrie Qualifier	2	Gracelyn Richards; Jodi Vaughan

== Teams ==
The teams are listed as follows:

Skip	Third	Second	Lead	Alternate	Coach	Club(s)
Serena Gray-Withers	Catherine Clifford	Brianna Cullen	Zoe Cinnamon		Amanda St. Laurent	Saville Community SC, Edmonton
Michelle Hartwell	Jessica Monk	Erica Wiese	Ashley Kalk	Tori Hartwell	Jim Weber	Sherwood Park CC, Sherwood Park
Jessie Hunkin	Jessie Haughian	Becca Hebert	Dayna Demmans		Lesley McEwan	Spruce Grove CC, Spruce Grove
Nicky Kaufman	Karynn Flory	Kim Curtin	Krysta Hilker		Taina Smiley	Avonair CC, Edmonton
Gracelyn Richards	Sophia Ryhorchuk	Rachel Jacques	Amy Wheatcroft		Jessica Amundson	Saville Community SC, Edmonton
Kayla Skrlik	Brittany Tran	Geri-Lynn Ramsay	Ashton Skrlik	Crystal Webster	Shannon Kleibrink	Garrison CC, Calgary
Selena Sturmay	Danielle Schmiemann	Dezaray Hawes	Paige Papley		Ted Appelman	Saville Community SC, Edmonton
Jodi Vaughan	Marla Sherrer	Chantele Broderson	Valerie Ekelund	Susan O'Connor		Okotoks CC, Okotoks; Lacombe CC, Lacombe; Lethbridge CC, Lethbridge; The Glencoe Club, Calgary

== Round robin standings ==
Final Round Robin Standings

Key
Teams to Playoffs

Skip	W	L	PF	PA	EW	EL	BE	SE
Selena Sturmay	6	1	60	33	36	21	2	14
Serena Gray-Withers	5	2	60	41	29	29	3	5
Kayla Skrlik	4	3	50	44	30	28	3	8
Jessie Hunkin	4	3	54	48	32	30	2	11
Nicky Kaufman	4	3	54	52	28	30	0	8
Gracelyn Richards	3	4	40	54	25	27	0	7
Michelle Hartwell	2	5	42	55	28	32	2	5
Jodi Vaughan	0	7	35	68	24	35	4	4

== Round robin results ==
All draw times are listed in Mountain Time (UTC-07:00).

=== Draw 1 ===
Wednesday, January 24, 6:30 pm

Sheet A	1	2	3	4	5	6	7	8	9	10	Final
Jessie Hunkin	0	3	0	0	3	0	0	1	1	2	10
Jodi Vaughan 🔨	1	0	1	1	0	1	2	0	0	0	6

Sheet B	1	2	3	4	5	6	7	8	9	10	Final
Nicky Kaufman	2	0	0	0	0	2	0	X	X	X	4
Kayla Skrlik 🔨	0	2	1	4	2	0	2	X	X	X	11

Sheet C	1	2	3	4	5	6	7	8	9	10	Final
Gracelyn Richards	0	0	0	0	1	0	0	X	X	X	1
Selena Sturmay 🔨	0	3	1	2	0	2	2	X	X	X	10

Sheet D	1	2	3	4	5	6	7	8	9	10	11	Final
Serena Gray-Withers	0	2	0	2	1	0	2	0	1	0	0	8
Michelle Hartwell 🔨	2	0	2	0	0	1	0	2	0	1	1	9

=== Draw 2 ===
Thursday, January 25, 10:00 am

Sheet A	1	2	3	4	5	6	7	8	9	10	Final
Nicky Kaufman	0	3	0	2	0	1	0	3	0	0	9
Selena Sturmay 🔨	1	0	2	0	1	0	3	0	1	2	10

Sheet B	1	2	3	4	5	6	7	8	9	10	Final
Jessie Hunkin 🔨	2	2	0	0	3	2	X	X	X	X	9
Michelle Hartwell	0	0	1	1	0	0	X	X	X	X	2

Sheet C	1	2	3	4	5	6	7	8	9	10	Final
Serena Gray-Withers 🔨	2	0	1	0	4	0	1	0	3	X	11
Jodi Vaughan	0	1	0	2	0	2	0	2	0	X	7

Sheet D	1	2	3	4	5	6	7	8	9	10	Final
Gracelyn Richards	1	0	3	0	0	1	0	3	1	X	9
Kayla Skrlik 🔨	0	1	0	0	2	0	1	0	0	X	4

=== Draw 3 ===
Thursday, January 25, 6:30 pm

Sheet A	1	2	3	4	5	6	7	8	9	10	Final
Serena Gray-Withers 🔨	2	0	3	0	5	X	X	X	X	X	10
Gracelyn Richards	0	1	0	2	0	X	X	X	X	X	3

Sheet B	1	2	3	4	5	6	7	8	9	10	Final
Jodi Vaughan 🔨	0	0	0	1	0	0	0	X	X	X	1
Selena Sturmay	0	3	2	0	1	1	1	X	X	X	8

Sheet C	1	2	3	4	5	6	7	8	9	10	Final
Michelle Hartwell	0	0	1	0	0	1	0	1	X	X	3
Kayla Skrlik 🔨	2	2	0	0	1	0	2	0	X	X	7

Sheet D	1	2	3	4	5	6	7	8	9	10	11	Final
Jessie Hunkin 🔨	0	0	3	1	0	1	0	2	1	0	0	8
Nicky Kaufman	2	2	0	0	1	0	2	0	0	1	1	9

=== Draw 4 ===
Friday, January 26, 10:00 am

Sheet A	1	2	3	4	5	6	7	8	9	10	Final
Selena Sturmay	0	2	1	0	1	0	1	0	2	0	7
Kayla Skrlik 🔨	0	0	0	3	0	2	0	2	0	1	8

Sheet B	1	2	3	4	5	6	7	8	9	10	Final
Serena Gray-Withers	0	2	0	0	0	0	1	1	6	X	10
Jessie Hunkin 🔨	1	0	1	1	0	1	0	0	0	X	4

Sheet C	1	2	3	4	5	6	7	8	9	10	Final
Nicky Kaufman 🔨	2	0	2	1	0	5	X	X	X	X	10
Gracelyn Richards	0	1	0	0	1	0	X	X	X	X	2

Sheet D	1	2	3	4	5	6	7	8	9	10	Final
Michelle Hartwell 🔨	1	0	0	1	0	4	0	2	3	X	11
Jodi Vaughan	0	1	1	0	1	0	3	0	0	X	6

=== Draw 5 ===
Friday, January 26, 4:00 pm

Sheet A	1	2	3	4	5	6	7	8	9	10	Final
Gracelyn Richards	0	1	1	1	0	0	2	0	0	X	5
Jessie Hunkin 🔨	2	0	0	0	5	1	0	0	1	X	9

Sheet B	1	2	3	4	5	6	7	8	9	10	Final
Kayla Skrlik	0	0	0	1	1	2	0	2	0	1	7
Jodi Vaughan 🔨	0	0	1	0	0	0	1	0	1	0	3

Sheet C	1	2	3	4	5	6	7	8	9	10	Final
Selena Sturmay 🔨	1	1	0	0	2	0	1	0	3	X	8
Michelle Hartwell	0	0	0	1	0	2	0	2	0	X	5

Sheet D	1	2	3	4	5	6	7	8	9	10	Final
Nicky Kaufman	0	0	0	1	0	0	2	1	0	X	4
Serena Gray-Withers 🔨	0	0	2	0	1	1	0	0	4	X	8

=== Draw 6 ===
Saturday, January 27, 10:00 am

Sheet A	1	2	3	4	5	6	7	8	9	10	Final
Kayla Skrlik	1	0	1	0	1	0	1	1	0	X	5
Serena Gray-Withers 🔨	0	1	0	1	0	4	0	0	3	X	9

Sheet B	1	2	3	4	5	6	7	8	9	10	Final
Michelle Hartwell	0	0	1	0	2	1	0	1	0	0	5
Gracelyn Richards 🔨	1	2	0	1	0	0	3	0	1	1	9

Sheet C	1	2	3	4	5	6	7	8	9	10	Final
Jodi Vaughan 🔨	2	0	0	1	0	0	0	3	0	X	6
Nicky Kaufman	0	1	3	0	3	0	1	0	2	X	10

Sheet D	1	2	3	4	5	6	7	8	9	10	Final
Selena Sturmay	0	1	0	1	0	0	3	2	0	1	8
Jessie Hunkin 🔨	1	0	1	0	2	0	0	0	1	0	5

=== Draw 7 ===
Saturday, January 27, 6:30 pm

Sheet A	1	2	3	4	5	6	7	8	9	10	Final
Michelle Hartwell 🔨	0	1	0	1	0	2	2	0	1	0	7
Nicky Kaufman	0	0	2	0	3	0	0	2	0	1	8

Sheet B	1	2	3	4	5	6	7	8	9	10	Final
Selena Sturmay	1	0	2	0	0	1	0	2	3	X	9
Serena Gray-Withers 🔨	0	1	0	1	1	0	1	0	0	X	4

Sheet C	1	2	3	4	5	6	7	8	9	10	11	Final
Kayla Skrlik 🔨	0	3	0	1	0	0	0	2	0	2	0	8
Jessie Hunkin	1	0	3	0	0	1	1	0	2	0	1	9

Sheet D	1	2	3	4	5	6	7	8	9	10	Final
Jodi Vaughan	0	1	1	0	0	2	0	2	0	X	6
Gracelyn Richards 🔨	3	0	0	1	2	0	2	0	3	X	11

== Playoffs ==
Semifinal			Final
			1	Selena Sturmay	6
2	Serena Gray-Withers	8	3	Kayla Skrlik	5
3	Kayla Skrlik	9

=== Semifinal ===
Sunday, January 28, 10:00 am

Sheet B	1	2	3	4	5	6	7	8	9	10	11	Final
Serena Gray-Withers 🔨	0	3	0	1	0	1	0	0	2	1	0	8
Kayla Skrlik	2	0	2	0	0	0	1	3	0	0	1	9

=== Final ===
Sunday, January 28, 3:00 pm

Sheet B	1	2	3	4	5	6	7	8	9	10	Final
Selena Sturmay 🔨	0	1	0	0	1	0	1	0	1	2	6
Kayla Skrlik	0	0	1	1	0	1	0	2	0	0	5

2024 Alberta Scotties Tournament of Hearts

Selena Sturmay
1st Alberta Provincial Championship title
