= Kim Min-ji (curler) =

South Korean curler (born 1999)

Kim Min-ji 김민지
- Curler
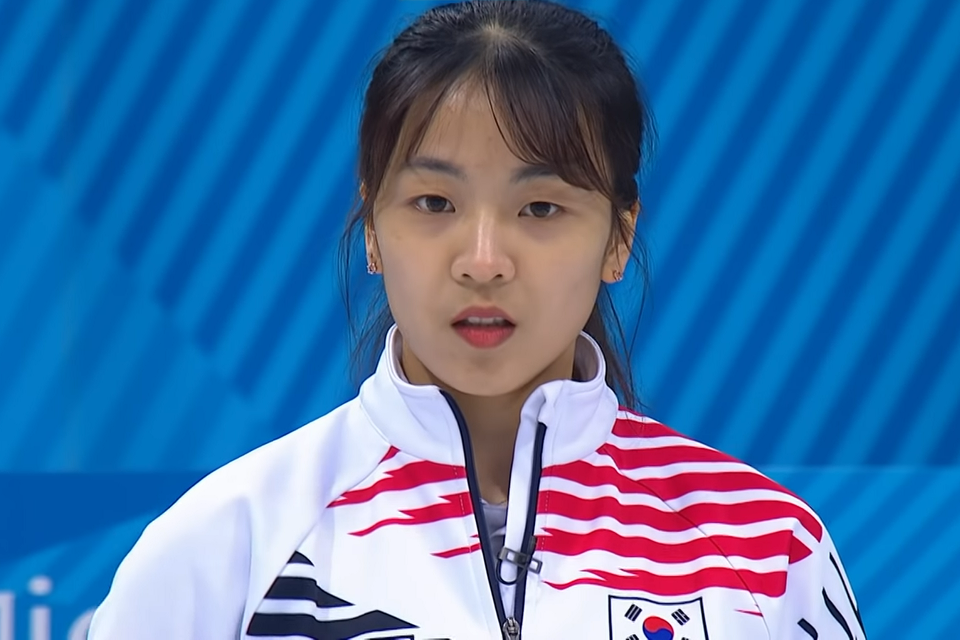
- Born: August 16, 1999 (age 27); Uijeongbu, Gyeonggi Province, South Korea

Team
- Curling club: Uijeongbu CC, Uijeongbu, KOR
- Skip: Gim Eun-ji
- Fourth: Kim Min-ji
- Second: Kim Su-ji
- Lead: Seol Ye-eun
- Alternate: Seol Ye-ji

Curling career
- Member Association: South Korea
- World Championship: 4 (2019, 2024, 2025, 2026)
- World Mixed Doubles Championship: 1 (2022)
- Pacific-Asia Championship: 1 (2018)
- Pan Continental Championship: 3 (2023, 2024, 2025)
- World Junior Curling Championship: 5 (2016, 2017, 2018, 2019, 2020)
- Olympic: 1 (2026)
- Other appearances: Asian Winter Games: 1 (2025)
- Grand Slam victories: 1 (2023 National)
Medal record
Women's curling
Representing South Korea
World Championships
| Bronze medal – third place | 2019 Silkeborg |
| Bronze medal – third place | 2024 Sydney |
Asian Winter Games
| Gold medal – first place | 2025 Harbin | Women's |
Pan Continental Championships
| Gold medal – first place | 2023 Kelowna |
| Silver medal – second place | 2024 Lacombe |
| Bronze medal – third place | 2025 Virginia |
Pacific-Asia Championships
| Gold medal – first place | 2018 Gangneung |
World Junior Championships
| Silver medal – second place | 2020 Krasnoyarsk |
| Bronze medal – third place | 2016 Copenhagen |
Winter Universiade
| Silver medal – second place | 2019 Krasnoyarsk |
Representing Gyeonggi
Korean Women's Championship
| Gold medal – first place | 2023 Gangneung |
| Gold medal – first place | 2024 Uijeongbu |
| Gold medal – first place | 2025 Uijeongbu |
| Gold medal – first place | 2026 Uiseong |
| Silver medal – second place | 2016 Uiseong |
| Silver medal – second place | 2017 Icheon |
| Silver medal – second place | 2022 Jincheon |
Representing Chuncheon
Korean Women's Championship
| Gold medal – first place | 2018 Jincheon |
| Silver medal – second place | 2019 Gangneung |
| Silver medal – second place | 2021 Gangneung |
| Bronze medal – third place | 2020 Gangneung |
Representing Gangwon
Korean Mixed Doubles Championship
| Gold medal – first place | 2021 Jincheon |

Kim Min-ji
Personal information
- Nationality: South Korean

Korean name
- Hangul: 김민지
- RR: Gim Minji
- MR: Kim Minji

Kim Min-ji (born August 16, 1999) is a South Korean curler. She currently throws fourth stones on the Gyeonggi Province curling team skipped by Gim Eun-ji. She is a 2018 Pacific-Asia Curling champion.

== Career ==
Kim skipped the South Korean junior team at the 2016 World Junior Curling Championships. She led her team of Kim Hye-rin, Yang Tae-i, Oh Su-yun and Lee Ji-young to a bronze medal finish. After finishing the round robin with a 7–2 record, the team lost to Hungary (skipped by Dorottya Palancsa) in the 3 vs. 4 page playoff game, but went on to beat the Hungarians in a re-match in the bronze medal game, after Hungary lost in the semifinal.

Kim began skipping a team on the World Curling Tour in 2016. She won her first tour event by claiming the 2016 Hub International Crown of Curling.

Kim, and teammates Kim Hye-rin, Yang and Kim Su-jin represented Korea at the 2017 World Junior Curling Championships. The team posted a 5–4 round robin record, tied with Switzerland for fourth. They would beat the Swiss in a tiebreaker, before losing two straight games against Canada to finish in fourth place. This same team represented Korea at the 2018 World Junior Curling Championships. There, Kim led the team to a 4–5 record, missing the playoffs.

Kim began the 2018–19 season by winning the Hokkaido Bank Curling Classic. Then she and her team won gold on 2018 Pacific-Asia Curling Championships, earning South Korea a berth into the 2019 World Women's Curling Championship.

She and her team participated in all four legs of the 2018–19 Curling World Cup. In the First Leg, they finished with a 1–5 record, placing seventh out of eight teams. At the Second Leg, she and her team made it all the way to the final falling just short to Japan's Satsuki Fujisawa 7–6. Her team improved on this performance by winning the Third Leg against Sweden's Anna Hasselborg rink. In the Grand Final, the team finished with a 2–4 record.

Her team, still junior eligible represented Korea at the 2019 World Junior Curling Championships. They finished the round robin with a 6–3 record, which was tied with three other teams for the second best record. However, they missed the playoffs due to tiebreaker rules. The following month, the team represented Korea at the 2019 Winter Universiade. This time their 6–3 record was enough to make the playoffs, where they made it all the way to the final before losing to Sweden. Later that month, the team had yet another international event to play in, the 2019 World Championship. The team was even better on this stage, finishing the round robin with a 9–3 record, in second place. In the playoffs, they lost to Switzerland's Silvana Tirinzoni rink in the semifinal, but rebounded to win the bronze medal game against Seina Nakajima of Japan. It was the first ever medal won by Korea at the Women's World Championship. The team ended their season with a 1–3 record at the 2019 Champions Cup Grand Slam of Curling event.

Team Kim lost the final of the 2019 Korean Curling Championships the following season in July 2019 to the Gim Un-chi. Up one in the tenth end, Kim missed her last shot and gave up a steal of two. This meant they would not be the national women's team for the season. The team won the Tour Challenge Tier 2 event after a strong 9–2 win over Jestyn Murphy. This qualified them for the Canadian Open in Yorkton, Saskatchewan. There, they defeated higher ranked teams such as three time Scotties champion Rachel Homan, 2013 world champion Eve Muirhead and 2020 Scotties champion Kerri Einarson. They made it all the way to the final before losing to the Anna Hasselborg rink in an extra end. They also made it all the way to the final of the 2020 World Junior Curling Championships, where they lost to Canada's Mackenzie Zacharias. On the World Curling Tour, they won the Boundary Ford Curling Classic, finished fourth at the inaugural WCT Uiseong International Curling Cup, made the quarterfinals at the Red Deer Curling Classic and missed the playoffs at the 2019 Curlers Corner Autumn Gold Curling Classic and the 2019 Canad Inns Women's Classic.

Kim and her rink began the abbreviated 2020–21 season at the 2020 Korean Curling Championships. There, they qualified for the playoffs with a 5–1 record before losing both of their playoff games to the Kim Eun-jung and Gim Un-chi rinks, settling for third. Later that season, Team Kim competed in the only two Grand Slam events of the season, which were played in a "curling bubble" in Calgary, Alberta, with no spectators, to avoid the spread of the coronavirus. The team missed the playoffs at both the 2021 Champions Cup and the 2021 Players' Championship.

The 2021–22 season began in June for Team Kim as they competed in the 2021 Korean Curling Championships to decide who would get the chance to represent Korea at the 2022 Winter Olympics in Beijing, China. In the first of three rounds, the team went a perfect 4–0 in the round robin before losing in the semifinal to the Gim Un-chi rink. They rebounded with a win over Kim Ji-su in the third place game. In the second round, they went 4–2, however, because Team Kim Eun-jung won both the first and second rounds, they became the national champions. Kim later competed in the 2021 Korean Mixed Doubles Curling Championship with partner Lee Ki-jeong. The pair qualified through the Gangwon qualifier with a perfect 5–0 record. They then won twelve straight matches to claim the national mixed doubles title. Because of this, Kim was absent from her women's team for the rest of the season. In October, Kim and Lee captured the WCT Heracles Mixed Doubles Slovakia Cup on the World Curling Tour. At the 2021 Olympic Qualification Event, the pair lost in the qualification final to Australia's Tahli Gill and Dean Hewitt, meaning they would not compete in the Olympic Games. Kim and Lee again represented Korea at the 2022 World Mixed Doubles Curling Championship where they finished in fifteenth with a 4–5 record. In March 2022, Kim Min-ji moved to Gyeonggi Province to join Team Gim Eun-ji. The team competed in two Grand Slams at the end of the year, the 2022 Players' Championship and the 2022 Champions Cup. After missing the playoffs at the Players', the team made it all the way to the final of the Champions Cup where they lost to Kerri Einarson.

Team Gim had their best season to date during the 2022–23 season as they qualified for the playoffs in fourteen of fifteen events they played in. The team began their run at the 2022 Korean Curling Championships where they went 5–1 in the round robin. After beating Jeonbuk Province in the semifinal, they lost in the championship game 7–4 to Chuncheon City Hall, Kim's former team, meaning they would not be the national team. On tour, the team began at the first event of the Alberta Curling Series, where they went undefeated to claim the title. They next played in the 2022 Martensville International where after a 4–1 round robin record, they fell 8–4 in the semifinal to Clancy Grandy. They also reached the semifinals of the 2022 Saville Shoot-Out, the 2022 Alberta Curling Series Major, and the Prestige Hotels & Resorts Curling Classic. In the first Slam event, the 2022 National, Team Gim finished 2–2 through the round robin, but were able to beat Tabitha Peterson in a tiebreaker to qualify for the playoffs. In the quarterfinals, they lost 7–5 to Satsuki Fujisawa. The team had another quarterfinal finish the following week at the 2022 Western Showdown after a previously undefeated record. At the 2022 Tour Challenge, the team started with two straight losses before winning three straight sudden death games to advance to the playoffs. After defeating Team Kim in the quarterfinals, they lost 4–3 to Team Einarson in the semifinals. Team Gim's next event was the 2022 Curlers Corner Autumn Gold Curling Classic where they qualified for the playoffs through the B side. They then defeated Abby Ackland, Casey Scheidegger and Michèle Jäggi in the quarterfinals, semifinals, and championship game respectively to win the event, becoming the first Korean team to do so. The team continued their winning momentum into the Stu Sells Brantford Nissan Classic where they captured their third event title of the season. Team Gim wrapped up the 2022 part of their season at the 2022 Masters where they had another semifinal appearance, falling 5–3 to Rachel Homan. They also reached the semifinals of the next Slam, the 2023 Canadian Open, where they were again defeated by Team Fujisawa. The team wrapped up their season at the final two Slams, the 2023 Players' Championship and the 2023 Champions Cup. At the Players', they finished first through pool play with a 4–1 record to earn the top spot in the playoffs. They then lost 6–3 to Silvana Tirinzoni in the semifinal. At the Champions Cup, they missed the playoffs for the only time during the season. After a 3–2 record, they fell 9–4 to Team Hasselborg in a tiebreaker.

After their successful season which saw them rise to fifth in the world, Team Gim had an even better 2023–24 season with the team increasing their world ranking to third. At the 2023 Korean Curling Championships, the team lost just one game en route to claiming the national title, finishing the event with an unmatched 12–1 record. This gave Kim her second Korean title and earned her team the right to represent Korea at the 2023 Pan Continental Curling Championships and the 2024 World Women's Curling Championship. On tour, the team initially struggled to find major success in their first three events. At the 2023 Curlers Corner Autumn Gold Curling Classic, however, Team Gim went undefeated to defend their title, defeating Japan's Miori Nakamura 8–3 in the final. At the first Slam of the season, the 2023 Tour Challenge, the team finished as the number one seeds through the round robin before dropping their quarterfinal match to Kaitlyn Lawes. They then played in the Pan Continental Championships where they went 6–1 through the round robin, earning the number one seed in the playoffs. After defeating Canada's Kerri Einarson in the semifinal, they beat Japan's Satsuki Fujisawa in the final to claim Korea's first Pan Continental title. Next was the 2023 National where Team Gim again went undefeated through the round robin before defeating Stefania Constantini and Silvana Tirinzoni in the quarterfinals and semifinals respectively. This qualified them for the final where they defeated Team Rachel Homan 7–6, becoming the first Korean team to win a Grand Slam of Curling event. They then reached the final of the Uiseong Korean Cup where they lost to Team Kim. At the next two Slams, the 2023 Masters and the 2024 Canadian Open, the team lost in the quarterfinals to Einarson and Homan respectively. In their last event before the world championship, they lost just one game en route to claiming the 2024 International Bernese Ladies Cup, defeating Korean rival Kim Eun-jung in the final. Team Gim then represented Korea at the 2024 World Championship in Sydney, Nova Scotia. Through the round robin, the team lost just two games to Switzerland and Italy, finishing fourth with a 10–2 record. This included defeating Canada's Homan rink, being the only team to do so. After beating Sweden's Anna Hasselborg in the qualification round, they faced Canada again where they lost 9–7. This put them in the bronze medal game where Gim made a double takeout on her last shot to win the game for her team. It was Kim's second bronze medal at the world championship. The team ended their season at the 2024 Players' Championship where they lost in the semifinals to Isabella Wranå.

Kim and her team carried their momentum from the previous season into the 2024 Korean Curling Championships where they defended their national title. After finishing 5–2 in the round robin, the team won three straight playoff games to secure the gold medal. This again allowed them to represent Korea at all international events during the 2024–25 season which included the 2025 Asian Winter Games. On tour, the team had mixed results, consistently qualifying for the playoffs but failing to make it past the quarterfinals. They won their first event at the Alberta Curling Series Women's Major in Beaumont before again claiming the 2024 Curlers Corner Autumn Gold Curling Classic, becoming the first rink to win the event three consecutive times. At the 2024 Pan Continental Curling Championships, the team reached the final once again where they faced Canada's Rachel Homan. Tied in the tenth end, Gim's final stone failed to remove Canada's rock from scoring position, losing on a measurement and earning the silver medal. In the new year, the team dominated the Asian Winter Games, winning all ten of their games to claim gold. Next, they participated in the 2025 World Women's Curling Championship which was hosted in their hometown of Uijeongbu. There, they again had a strong round robin performance, losing only two of twelve games to earn a direct bye to the semifinals. However, they were unable to continue their successful run, losing to Canada and China to finish off the podium in fourth place. Despite their success in international events, Team Gim struggled on the Grand Slam circuit, only qualifying in one of five events and losing in the quarterfinals.

Team Gim won their third successive national championship at the 2025 Korean Curling Championships, qualifying themselves again to be the Korean national women's team at all international events for the 2025–26 season, including at the 2026 Winter Olympics. The team also had a strong start to the season, finishing second at the Saville Shootout, winning the Autumn Gold Curling Classic, and semifinalists at the Grand Slam of Curling Masters.

== Grand Slam record ==
Key
| C | Champion |
| F | Lost in Final |
| SF | Lost in Semifinal |
| QF | Lost in Quarterfinals |
| R16 | Lost in the round of 16 |
| Q | Did not advance to playoffs |
| T2 | Played in Tier 2 event |
| DNP | Did not participate in event |
| N/A | Not a Grand Slam event that season |

| Event | 2018–19 | 2019–20 | 2020–21 | 2021–22 | 2022–23 | 2023–24 | 2024–25 | 2025–26 | 2026–27 |
|---|---|---|---|---|---|---|---|---|---|
| Invitational | DNP | T2 | N/A | N/A | SF | QF | QF | QF | SF |
| Masters | DNP | DNP | N/A | DNP | SF | QF | Q | SF | QF |
| National | DNP | DNP | N/A | DNP | QF | C | Q | QF | Q |
| Open | DNP | F | N/A | N/A | SF | QF | Q | Q | |
| Players' | DNP | N/A | Q | Q | SF | SF | Q | SF | |
| Champions Cup | Q | N/A | Q | F | Q | N/A | N/A | N/A | N/A |
