= Selena Sturmay =

Canadian curler (born 1998)

- Curler
- Born: June 21, 1998 (age 28); Edmonton, Alberta

Team
- Curling club: Saville Community SC, Edmonton, AB
- Skip: Selena Sturmay
- Third: Danielle Schmiemann
- Second: Dezaray Hawes
- Lead: Paige Papley
- Alternate: Brianna Cullen

Curling career
- Member Association: Alberta
- Hearts: 3 (2024, 2025, 2026)
- Top CTRS ranking: 5th (2023–24)
Medal record
Women's curling
Representing Canada
World Junior Curling Championships
Silver medal – second place	2019 Liverpool
Representing Alberta
Scotties Tournament of Hearts
Bronze medal – third place	2026 Mississauga

Selena Sturmay (born June 21, 1998) is a Canadian curler from Edmonton, Alberta. She currently skips her own team out of the Saville Community Sports Centre.

== Career ==
=== Juniors ===
Sturmay made her first appearance at the Canadian Junior Curling Championships in 2016, skipping her team of Dacey Brown, Megan Moffat and Hope Sunley out of Airdrie. She qualified for the national championship by making a runback double takeout to defeat Kayla Skrlik in the championship game. After a 4–2 round robin record, her team finished 6–4 in the championship pool, placing fifth.

Sturmay and her brother Karsten represented Alberta at the 2018 Canadian Mixed Doubles Curling Championship. There, the pair went 3–4 in the round robin, not enough to qualify for the playoff round. Also in 2018, she was part of the Kristen Streifel rink that won the U Sports/Curling Canada University Curling Championships, qualifying for the 2019 Winter Universiade. There, Team Streifel, representing the University of Alberta, led Canada to a 7–2 round robin record, qualifying for the playoffs. They then lost to Great Britain's Sophie Jackson in the quarterfinals 6–4, settling for fifth.

Sturmay won her second provincial junior title in 2019 skipping a new team of Abby Marks, Kate Goodhelpsen and Paige Papley. At the 2019 Canadian Junior Curling Championships, she would find much more success, posting an undefeated 10–0 record through the round robin and championship pools. This qualified her team for the final where they faced British Columbia's Sarah Daniels. After a tied 6–6 game through eight ends, the Alberta team scored three in the ninth end, going on to win the game by a 9–6 score. The win earned her team the right to represent Canada at the 2019 World Junior Curling Championships, where they qualified for the playoffs with a 6–3 record. They then beat Switzerland's Raphaela Keiser in the semifinal to qualify for the final against Russia's Vlada Rumiantseva. Holding the hammer in the extra end, Sturmay's threw her final draw heavy, giving up a steal of one and the win to the Russian team. Also during the 2018–19 season, she led the Alberta Pandas to a 4–3 record at the university championship, not qualifying for the playoffs.

=== Women's ===
The following season, Sturmay aged out of juniors and formed a new team with Chantele Broderson, Goodhelpsen and Lauren Marks. The team did not have a successful season, failing to qualify for the playoffs in any of their tour events and not reaching the 2020 Alberta Scotties Tournament of Hearts. She was, however, able to secure her second U Sport title at the 2020 U Sports/Curling Canada University Curling Championships, skipping the Alberta Pandas to a 10–2 victory over Justine Comeau's UNB Reds team in the final game.

After joining the Kayla Skrlik rink at third for the abbreviated 2020–21 season, Sturmay returned to skipping her own team of former teammates Abby Marks, Catherine Clifford, Paige Paley and Kate Goodhelpsen for the 2021–22 season. The team was able to find success on tour, reaching the final of the Alberta Curling Series: Avonair spiel and the semifinals of the Red Deer Curling Classic and the Alberta Curling Series: Thistle event respectively. They also qualified for the 2022 Alberta Scotties Tournament of Hearts, where they finished in seventh place with a 2–5 record. The team ended their season at the Alberta Curling Tour Championship where they defeated Team Skrlik 9–2 in the championship game. Sturmay did not play in the team's final event, however. Additionally, Sturmay spared for Team Skrlik at the 2022 Best of the West event where they went 1–2, missing the playoffs.

Team Sturmay began the 2022–23 season at the 2022 Alberta Curling Series: Event 1 where they lost in the final to South Korea's Gim Eun-ji. In September, they were invited to compete in the 2022 PointsBet Invitational due to ranking thirteenth in the CTRS standings. They were able to upset Chelsea Carey in the opening round before losing to eventual champions Jennifer Jones in the quarterfinal round. In October, they qualified for their first Grand Slam of Curling event, the 2022 Tour Challenge Tier 2, where they finished 1–3. At the 2022 Curlers Corner Autumn Gold Curling Classic, the team qualified for the playoffs before a 5–3 loss to Casey Scheidegger in the quarterfinals. For the 2023 Alberta Scotties Tournament of Hearts, Sturmay and second Kate Goodhelpsen played with Heather Nedohin and Dacey Brown who spared for Abby Marks and Paige Papley respectively. The team started the provincial championship with five straight wins before losing their last two round robin games to Scheidegger and Kayla Skrlik. Their 5–2 record qualified them for the semifinal where they fell 11–3 to Team Scheidegger. They ended their season at the Best of the West championship where they finished 1–3. After the season, the team disbanded, and Sturmay formed a new team with third Danielle Schmiemann, second Dezaray Hawes and lead Paige Papley for the 2023–24 season.

The new Sturmay team had mixed results to begin the season, qualifying for the playoffs in three of their first five events but never advancing past the quarterfinals. The team turned things around in October, however, beginning at the Saville Grand Prix where after an opening draw loss, they ran the table to claim the title. They continued their momentum into the Red Deer Curling Classic where they advanced all the way to the final before losing to the Rachel Homan rink. In their next two events, they reached the semifinals of the DeKalb Superspiel and the final of the MCT Championships, losing out to Xenia Schwaller and Beth Peterson respectively. In the new year, the team got a last-minute call to play in the 2024 Canadian Open after Stefania Constantini dropped out due to illness. There, they finished with a 1–3 record, defeating Jolene Campbell in their sole victory. Next was the 2024 Alberta Scotties Tournament of Hearts where Team Sturmay finished first through the round robin with a 6–1 record, earning them a bye to the final. There, they faced defending champions Team Skrlik. Down one without the hammer in the tenth, the team stole two after Kayla Skrlik's final draw went through the rings. This qualified the team for the 2024 Scotties Tournament of Hearts, Sturmay's first appearance at the national women's championship. The Alberta squad had a stellar performance through the round robin, finishing first through their pool with a 7–1 record. This included wins over Scotties veterans Kerri Einarson, Kaitlyn Lawes and Krista McCarville. After losing to Jennifer Jones in the first round of the championship, they again beat Lawes to advance to the playoffs. There, they fell 6–4 to Manitoba's Kate Cameron in the 3 vs. 4 game, finishing fourth. The following season, in a change to the qualification process, three teams in the field at the Scotties Tournament of Hearts pre-qualified for the 2025 Scotties based on their 2023–24 Canadian Team Ranking Standings, and Curling Canada announced Sturmay would be one of these teams, which meant they bypassed and did not have to play in the 2025 Alberta provincial championship. At the 2025 Scotties, Team Sturmay would finish 4–4 after round robin play, failing to qualify for the playoffs.

Team Sturmay's success over the 2023–25 seasons and Canadian Team Ranking Standings qualified Sturmay for the 2025 Canadian Olympic Curling Pre-Trials. At the 2025 Pre-Trials, the Sturmay rink would win the event, finishing first in the round robin with a 5–2 record and then beating Kayla MacMillan 2 games to 1 in the best-of-three final. This would qualify the rink for the 2025 Canadian Olympic Curling Trials, with a shot to represent Canada at the 2026 Winter Olympics. There, Sturmay would finish with a 4–3 record, finishing 4th and just missing out on the playoffs. Team Sturmay would continue their success, winning the 2026 Alberta Women's Curling Championship, beating Serena Gray-Withers 9–5 in the final, qualifying Sturmay to represent Alberta at the 2026 Scotties Tournament of Hearts. At the 2026 Scotties, Sturmay would improve on their previous performances, going 6–2 in the round-robin, and qualify for the playoffs. After beating Nova Scotia's Christina Black in the 3v4 game, Sturmay would then lose to Kerri Einarson 12–5 in the semifinal, winning the bronze medal.

== Personal life ==
Sturmay is employed as a registered nurse with Alberta Health Services. She is married to Keaton Boyd

== Grand Slam record ==
Key
C	Champion
F	Lost in Final
SF	Lost in Semifinal
QF	Lost in Quarterfinals
R16	Lost in the round of 16
Q	Did not advance to playoffs
T2	Played in Tier 2 event
DNP	Did not participate in event
N/A	Not a Grand Slam event that season

Event	2022–23	2023–24	2024–25	2025–26	2026–27
Invitational	T2	DNP	Q	DNP	DNP
Masters	DNP	DNP	DNP	DNP	SF
National	DNP	DNP	DNP	DNP	Q
Open	DNP	Q	Q	DNP	

== Teams ==
Season	Skip	Third	Second	Lead
2011–12	Selena Sturmay	Dacey Brown	Megan Moffat	Hope Sunley
2012–13	Selena Sturmay	Dacey Brown	Megan Moffat	Hope Sunley
2013–14	Selena Sturmay	Dacey Brown	Megan Moffat	Hope Sunley
2014–15	Selena Sturmay	Dacey Brown	Megan Moffat	Hope Sunley
2015–16	Selena Sturmay	Dacey Brown	Megan Moffat	Hope Sunley
2016–17	Selena Sturmay	Dacey Brown	Megan Moffat	Hope Sunley
2017–18	Selena Sturmay	Chantele Broderson	Kate Goodhelpsen	Paige Papley
2018–19	Selena Sturmay	Abby Marks	Kate Goodhelpsen	Paige Papley
2019–20	Selena Sturmay	Chantele Broderson	Kate Goodhelpsen	Lauren Marks
2020–21	Kayla Skrlik	Selena Sturmay	Brittany Tran	Ashton Skrlik
2021–22	Selena Sturmay	Abby Marks	Catherine Clifford	Paige Papley
2022–23	Selena Sturmay	Abby Marks	Kate Goodhelpsen	Paige Papley
2023–24	Selena Sturmay	Danielle Schmiemann	Dezaray Hawes	Paige Papley
2024–25	Selena Sturmay	Danielle Schmiemann	Dezaray Hawes	Paige Papley
2025–26	Selena Sturmay	Danielle Schmiemann	Dezaray Hawes	Paige Papley
2026–27	Selena Sturmay	Danielle Schmiemann	Dezaray Hawes	Paige Papley
