= Gim Eun-ji =

South Korean curler (born 1990)

- Curler
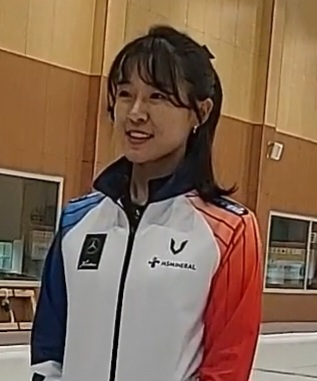
- Other names: Gim Un-chi
- Born: January 23, 1990 (age 36); Dangjin, South Korea

Team
- Curling club: Uijeongbu CC, Uijeongbu
- Skip: Gim Eun-ji
- Fourth: Kim Min-ji
- Second: Kim Su-ji
- Lead: Seol Ye-eun
- Alternate: Seol Ye-ji

Curling career
- Member Association: South Korea
- World Championship: 7 (2011, 2012, 2014, 2016, 2024, 2025, 2026)
- Pacific-Asia Championship: 5 (2010, 2011, 2013, 2015, 2019)
- Pan Continental Championship: 3 (2023, 2024, 2025)
- Olympic: 2 (2014, 2026)
- Other appearances: Asian Winter Games: 1 (2025)
- Grand Slam victories: 1 (2023 National)
Medal record
Women's curling
Representing South Korea
World Championships
Bronze medal – third place	2024 Sydney
Asian Winter Games
Gold medal – first place	2025 Harbin	Women's
Pan Continental Championships
Gold medal – first place	2023 Kelowna
Silver medal – second place	2024 Lacombe
Bronze medal – third place	2025 Virginia
Pacific-Asia Championships
Gold medal – first place	2010 Uiseong
Gold medal – first place	2013 Shanghai
Silver medal – second place	2011 Nanjing
Silver medal – second place	2015 Almaty
Bronze medal – third place	2019 Shenzhen
Winter Universiade
Silver medal – second place	2013 Trentino
Bronze medal – third place	2011 Erzurum
Representing Gyeonggi
Korean Women's Championship
Gold medal – first place	2011 Uijeongbu
Gold medal – first place	2013 Chuncheon
Gold medal – first place	2015 Icheon
Gold medal – first place	2019 Gangneung
Gold medal – first place	2023 Gangneung
Gold medal – first place	2024 Uijeongbu
Gold medal – first place	2025 Uijeongbu
Gold medal – first place	2026 Uiseong
Silver medal – second place	2020 Gangneung
Silver medal – second place	2022 Jincheon
Bronze medal – third place	2012 Uijeongbu
Bronze medal – third place	2016 Uiseong
Bronze medal – third place	2017 Icheon
Bronze medal – third place	2018 Jincheon
Bronze medal – third place	2021 Gangneung

- Gim Eun-ji
- Hangul: 김은지
- RR: Gim Eunji
- MR: Kim Ŭnji

Gim Eun-ji also known as Gim Un-chi (born January 23, 1990) is a Korean curler from Uijeongbu. She currently skips the Gyeonggi Province curling team.

== Career ==
Gim played as lead in her first world championship at the 2011 Capital One World Women's Curling Championship along with skip Kim Ji-sun. The team struggled finishing in last place with a 2–9 record. At the 2012 World Women's Curling Championship, South Korea made history by making the playoffs for the first time with an 8–3 record. They defeated Canada to advance to the semifinal, but lost a close game against eventual champions Switzerland. They then lost another close game to the Canadians in the bronze medal game, finishing in fourth place. Their fourth-place finish ensured them a spot in the 2014 Winter Olympics, even though South Korea did not qualify for the 2013 World Championships. At the Olympics, Gim played in the third and fourth positions, and the Korean team finished in eighth place with a 3–6 record. A month after the Olympics, Gim and her team represented South Korea at the 2014 World Women's Curling Championship in Saint John, New Brunswick. Like in 2012, the team had a successful run finishing round robin play with an 8–3 record and winning the tiebreaker 7–5 over Sweden's Margaretha Sigfridsson to qualify for the playoffs. They defeated Russia's Anna Sidorova in the 3 vs. 4 game but then lost the semifinal to, once again, Switzerland who went on to win the event. Gim missed her final shot of the bronze medal game and the Russian's stole the win 7–6.

The 2014–15 season was not a good season for the team. They won a World Curling Tour, the Crestwood Ladies Fall Classic but they didn't play in the 2014 Pacific-Asia Curling Championships and South Korea did not qualify for the 2015 World Women's Curling Championship. The 2015–16 season was successful for the team. They won the Hub International Crown of Curling, finished second at the 2015 Pacific-Asia Curling Championships and qualified for the 2016 World Women's Curling Championship. Gim and her team struggled during the World's, finishing in seventh place with a 5–6 record. Gim finished off the season with a third-place finish at the Korean National Championship.

Gim played in a number of events in the 2016–17 season and made the playoffs in a few as well. The team finished second at the inaugural Hokkaido Bank Curling Classic, third at the Hub International Crown of Curling and the Medicine Hat Charity Classic and fifth at the Crestwood Ladies Fall Classic. They also won the Karuizawa International 7–4 over Margaretha Sigfridsson. For the 2017–18 season they didn't play as many events but still found success finishing runner-up at the Prestige Hotels & Resorts Curling Classic to Rachel Homan and qualifying for the quarterfinals at the Colonial Square Ladies Classic, Karuizawa International and the Glynhill Ladies International.

The team had a full schedule for the 2018–19 season, beginning with the Hokkaido Bank Curling Classic where they finished fourth. On tour in Canada, they reached the final of the Gord Carroll Curling Classic where they lost to Chelsea Brandwood. They also made the semifinals of the Prestige Hotels & Resorts Curling Classic and the quarterfinals of the Canad Inns Women's Classic. Team Gim was invited to play in the 2018 Tour Challenge Tier 2 Grand Slam event where they qualified for the playoffs as the number one seed. They then lost to Kristen Streifel 8–6 in the quarterfinals.

In summer 2019, Team Gim would win the 2019 Korean Curling Championships after stealing two in the tenth end of the final against Kim Min-ji. To start their tour season, her team had a quarterfinal finish at the 2019 Cameron's Brewing Oakville Fall Classic. They followed this by missing the playoffs at the 2019 Stu Sells Oakville Tankard, a semifinal finish at the 2019 AMJ Campbell Shorty Jenkins Classic and winning the 2019 KW Fall Classic posting a perfect 7–0 record en route to capturing the title. At the 2019 Pacific-Asia Curling Championships, Gim and her team had a disappointing finish. After going 6–1 in the round robin, they lost the semi-final to China's Han Yu. This performance meant they didn't qualify Korea for the 2020 World Championship through the Pacific region and would have to play in the World Qualification Event for their spot in the World's. Next Team Gim competed in the 2019 Boundary Ford Curling Classic where they lost in the final to Kim Min-ji. Two weeks later, they played in the Jim Sullivan Curling Classic in Saint John, New Brunswick, the same city where the team had success in 2014 at the World's. It was another successful run for the rink as they went 7–0 through the tournament to capture the title. Gim's rink went undefeated at the World Qualification Event, going 7–0 in the round robin and defeating Italy in the 1 vs. 2 playoff game to qualify South Korea for the World Championship. The team was set to represent South Korea at the 2020 World Women's Curling Championship before the event got cancelled due to the COVID-19 pandemic. The World Qualification Event would be their last event of the season as the remaining two events (the Players' Championship and the Champions Cup Grand Slam events) were also cancelled due to the pandemic.

Team Gim was not able to defend their national title at the 2020 Korean Curling Championships in November 2020. After going 4–2 through the round robin, they defeated Um Min-ji 8–6 in the 3 vs. 4 game and then beat Kim Min-ji 9–4 in the semifinal. They then lost in the final to the undefeated Team Kim Eun-jung, meaning Team Kim won the right to represent Korea at the 2021 World Women's Curling Championship.

The 2021–22 season began in June for Team Gim as they competed in the 2021 Korean Curling Championships to decide who would get the chance to represent Korea at the 2022 Winter Olympics in Beijing, China. In the first of three rounds, the team went 3–1 in the round robin and then defeated the Kim Min-ji rink in the semifinal. They then lost to Kim Eun-jung in the final game. In the second round, they went 3–3, however, because Team Kim Eun-jung won both the first and second rounds, they became the national champions. Gim later competed in the 2021 Korean Mixed Doubles Curling Championship with partner Jeong Yeong-seok, however, failed to qualify for the playoff round. On tour, Team Gim won three events at the Chairman's Cup, the Boundary Ford Curling Classic, and the Ladies Alberta Open. They also reached the quarterfinal round of the 2021 Curlers Corner Autumn Gold Curling Classic and the final of the Red Deer Curling Classic where they lost to Satsuki Fujisawa. Team Gim also competed in all four Grand Slam events of the season, however, finished winless at the first three. In March 2022, Kim Min-ji moved to Gyeonggi Province to join Team Gim at third. The team competed in two Grand Slams at the end of the year, the 2022 Players' Championship and the 2022 Champions Cup. After missing the playoffs at the Players', the team made it all the way to the final of the Champions Cup where they lost to Kerri Einarson.

Team Gim had their best season to date during the 2022–23 season as they qualified for the playoffs in fourteen of fifteen events they played in. The team began their run at the 2022 Korean Curling Championships where they went 5–1 in the round robin. After beating Jeonbuk Province in the semifinal, they lost in the championship game 7–4 to Chuncheon City Hall's Ha Seung-youn, meaning they would not be the national team once again. On tour, the team began at the first event of the Alberta Curling Series, where they went undefeated to claim the title. They next played in the 2022 Martensville International where after a 4–1 round robin record, they fell 8–4 in the semifinal to Clancy Grandy. They also reached the semifinals of the 2022 Saville Shoot-Out, the 2022 Alberta Curling Series Major, and the Prestige Hotels & Resorts Curling Classic. In the first Slam event, the 2022 National, Team Gim finished 2–2 through the round robin, but were able to beat Tabitha Peterson in a tiebreaker to qualify for the playoffs. In the quarterfinals, they lost 7–5 to Satsuki Fujisawa. The team had another quarterfinal finish the following week at the 2022 Western Showdown after a previously undefeated record. At the 2022 Tour Challenge, the team started with two straight losses before winning three straight sudden death games to advance to the playoffs. After defeating Team Kim in the quarterfinals, they lost 4–3 to Team Einarson in the semifinals. Team Gim's next event was the 2022 Curlers Corner Autumn Gold Curling Classic where they qualified for the playoffs through the B side. They then defeated Abby Ackland, Casey Scheidegger and Michèle Jäggi in the quarterfinals, semifinals, and championship game respectively to win the event, becoming the first Korean team to do so. The team continued their winning momentum into the Stu Sells Brantford Nissan Classic where they captured their third event title of the season. Team Gim wrapped up the 2022 part of their season at the 2022 Masters where they had another semifinal appearance, falling 5–3 to Rachel Homan. They also reached the semifinals of the next Slam, the 2023 Canadian Open, where they were again defeated by Team Fujisawa. The team wrapped up their season at the final two Slams, the 2023 Players' Championship and the 2023 Champions Cup. At the Players', they finished first through pool play with a 4–1 record to earn the top spot in the playoffs. They then lost 6–3 to Silvana Tirinzoni in the semifinal. At the Champions Cup, they missed the playoffs for the only time during the season. After a 3–2 record, they fell 9–4 to Team Hasselborg in a tiebreaker.

After their successful season which saw them rise to fifth in the world, Team Gim had an even better 2023–24 season with the team increasing their world ranking to third. At the 2023 Korean Curling Championships, the team lost just one game en route to claiming the national title, finishing the event with an unmatched 12–1 record. This gave Gim her fifth Korean title and earned her team the right to represent Korea at the 2023 Pan Continental Curling Championships and the 2024 World Women's Curling Championship. On tour, the team initially struggled to find major success in their first three events. At the 2023 Curlers Corner Autumn Gold Curling Classic, however, Team Gim went undefeated to defend their title, defeating Japan's Miori Nakamura 8–3 in the final. At the first Slam of the season, the 2023 Tour Challenge, the team finished as the number one seeds through the round robin before dropping their quarterfinal match to Kaitlyn Lawes. They then played in the Pan Continental Championships where they went 6–1 through the round robin, earning the number one seed in the playoffs. After defeating Canada's Kerri Einarson in the semifinal, they beat Japan's Satsuki Fujisawa in the final to claim Korea's first Pan Continental title. Next was the 2023 National where Team Gim again went undefeated through the round robin before defeating Stefania Constantini and Silvana Tirinzoni in the quarterfinals and semifinals respectively. This qualified them for the final where they defeated Team Rachel Homan 7–6, becoming the first Korean team to win a Grand Slam of Curling event. They then reached the final of the Uiseong Korean Cup where they lost to Team Kim. At the next two Slams, the 2023 Masters and the 2024 Canadian Open, the team lost in the quarterfinals to Einarson and Homan respectively. In their last event before the world championship, they lost just one game en route to claiming the 2024 International Bernese Ladies Cup, defeating Korean rival Kim Eun-jung in the final. Team Gim then represented Korea at the 2024 World Championship in Sydney, Nova Scotia. Through the round robin, the team lost just two games to Switzerland and Italy, finishing fourth with a 10–2 record. This included defeating Canada's Homan rink, being the only team to do so. After beating Sweden's Anna Hasselborg in the qualification round, they faced Canada again where they lost 9–7. This put them in the bronze medal game where Gim made a double takeout on her last shot to win the game for her team. It was her first medal at a world championship, coming ten years after she lost the bronze medal game in 2014. The team ended their season at the 2024 Players' Championship where they lost in the semifinals to Isabella Wranå.

Gim and her team carried their momentum from the previous season into the 2024 Korean Curling Championships where they defended their national title. After finishing 5–2 in the round robin, the team won three straight playoff games to secure the gold medal. This again allowed them to represent Korea at all international events during the 2024–25 season which included the 2025 Asian Winter Games. On tour, the team had mixed results, consistently qualifying for the playoffs but failing to make it past the quarterfinals. They won their first event at the Alberta Curling Series Women's Major in Beaumont before again claiming the 2024 Curlers Corner Autumn Gold Curling Classic, becoming the first rink to win the event three consecutive times. At the 2024 Pan Continental Curling Championships, the team reached the final once again where they faced Canada's Rachel Homan. Tied in the tenth end, Gim's final stone failed to remove Canada's rock from scoring position, losing on a measurement and earning the silver medal. In the new year, the team dominated the Asian Winter Games, winning all ten of their games to claim gold. Next, they participated in the 2025 World Women's Curling Championship which was hosted in their hometown of Uijeongbu. There, they again had a strong round robin performance, losing only two of twelve games to earn a direct bye to the semifinals. However, they were unable to continue their successful run, losing to Canada and China to finish off the podium in fourth place. Despite their success in international events, Team Gim struggled on the Grand Slam circuit, only qualifying in one of five events and losing in the quarterfinals.

Gim and her team won their third successive national championship at the 2025 Korean Curling Championships, qualifying themselves again to be the Korean national women's team at all international events for the 2025–26 season, including at the 2026 Winter Olympics. Gim also had a strong start to the season, finishing second at the Saville Shootout, winning the Autumn Gold Curling Classic, and semifinalists at the Grand Slam of Curling Masters.

== Personal life ==
Gim attended Korea National Open University. She is married.

== Grand Slam record ==
Gim won South Korea's first Grand Slam championship at the 2023 National.

Key
C	Champion
F	Lost in Final
SF	Lost in Semifinal
QF	Lost in Quarterfinals
R16	Lost in the round of 16
Q	Did not advance to playoffs
T2	Played in Tier 2 event
DNP	Did not participate in event
N/A	Not a Grand Slam event that season

Event	2013–14	2014–15	2015–16	2016–17	2017–18	2018–19	2019–20	2020–21	2021–22	2022–23	2023–24	2024–25	2025–26	2026–27
Invitational	N/A	N/A	DNP	DNP	DNP	T2	DNP	N/A	N/A	SF	QF	QF	QF	SF
Masters	QF	DNP	DNP	DNP	DNP	DNP	DNP	N/A	Q	SF	QF	Q	SF	QF
National	N/A	N/A	DNP	DNP	DNP	DNP	DNP	N/A	Q	QF	C	Q	QF	Q
Open	DNP	DNP	DNP	DNP	DNP	DNP	DNP	N/A	N/A	SF	QF	Q	Q	
Players'	DNP	DNP	DNP	DNP	DNP	DNP	N/A	DNP	Q	SF	SF	Q	SF	
Champions Cup	DNP	DNP	DNP	DNP	DNP	DNP	N/A	DNP	F	Q	N/A	N/A	N/A	N/A

=== Former Grand Slam events ===
Event	2011–12	2012–13	2013–14	2014–15
Autumn Gold	Q	DNP	DNP	Q

== Teams ==
Season	Skip	Third	Second	Lead	Alternate
2010–11	Kim Ji-sun	Lee Seul-bee	Shin Mi-sung	Gim Un-chi	Lee Hyun-jung
2011–12	Kim Ji-sun	Lee Seul-bee	Gim Un-chi	Lee Hyun-jung	Shin Mi-sung
2012–13	Kim Ji-sun	Lee Seul-bee	Um Min-ji	Gim Un-chi	
2013–14 (Note: Alternated positions throughout the season.)	Kim Ji-sun	Gim Un-chi	Shin Mi-sung	Lee Seul-bee	Um Min-ji
2014–15	Gim Un-chi	Lee Seul-bee	Um Min-ji	Yeom Yoon-jung	
2015–16	Gim Un-chi (Fourth)	Lee Seul-bee	Um Min-ji	Kim Ji-sun (Skip)	Yeom Yoon-jung
2016–17	Gim Un-chi	Um Min-ji	Lee Seul-bee	Yeom Yoon-jung	Seol Ye-eun
2017–18	Gim Un-chi	Um Min-ji	Seol Ye-eun	Yeom Yoon-jung	Lee Seul-bee
2018–19	Gim Un-chi	Um Min-ji	Seol Ye-eun	Kim Su-ji	Seol Ye-ji
2019–20	Gim Un-chi	Um Min-ji	Kim Su-ji	Seol Ye-eun	Seol Ye-ji
2020–21	Gim Un-chi	Seol Ye-ji	Kim Su-ji	Seol Ye-eun	Park You-been
2021–22	Gim Un-chi	Seol Ye-ji	Kim Su-ji	Seol Ye-eun	Park You-been
2022–23	Gim Eun-ji	Kim Min-ji	Kim Su-ji	Seol Ye-eun	Seol Ye-ji
2023–24	Gim Eun-ji	Kim Min-ji	Kim Su-ji	Seol Ye-eun	Seol Ye-ji
2024–25	Gim Eun-ji	Kim Min-ji	Kim Su-ji	Seol Ye-eun	Seol Ye-ji
2025–26	Gim Eun-ji	Kim Min-ji	Kim Su-ji	Seol Ye-eun	Seol Ye-ji
2026–27	Kim Min-ji (Fourth)	Gim Eun-ji (Skip)	Kim Su-ji	Seol Ye-eun	Seol Ye-ji
