= Paige Papley =

Canadian curler

- Curler
- Born: March 10, 1999 (age 27); Edmonton, Alberta

Team
- Curling club: Saville Community SC, Edmonton, AB
- Skip: Selena Sturmay
- Third: Danielle Schmiemann
- Second: Dezaray Hawes
- Lead: Paige Papley
- Alternate: Brianna Cullen
- Mixed doubles partner: Evan van Amsterdam

Curling career
- Member Association: Alberta
- Hearts: 3 (2024, 2025, 2026)
- Top CTRS ranking: 5th (2023–24)
Medal record
Women's curling
Representing Canada
World Junior Curling Championships
| Silver medal – second place | 2019 Liverpool |
Representing Alberta
Scotties Tournament of Hearts
| Bronze medal – third place | 2026 Mississauga |

Paige Papley (born March 10, 1999) is a Canadian curler. She currently plays lead on Team Selena Sturmay. She is a former Canadian junior champion and world junior silver medallist.

== Career ==
=== Youth ===
As a U18 curler, Papley first found success playing third for Abby Marks. The team represented Alberta at the 2017 Canadian U18 Curling Championships. There, the team finished with a 5–3 record, just missing the playoffs.

Papley joined the Selena Sturmay junior rink in 2017, playing lead on the team. The team won the Alberta Junior Women's Curling Championship in 2019, sending the team to the 2019 Canadian Junior Curling Championships, where they would represent Alberta. There, the team went undefeated, winning all 11 of their games en route to the championship. With the win, the team earned the right to represent Canada at the 2019 World Junior Curling Championships. At the World Juniors, the team finished the round robin with a 6–3 record. They then beat Switzerland (Raphaela Keiser) in the semifinals, before losing to Russia (Vlada Rumiantseva) in the final, settling for a silver medal.

With Sturmay ageing out of juniors, the team's third, Abby Marks formed a new team with Papley throwing second. The team won the 2020 Alberta Juniors, sending the team to the 2020 Canadian Junior Curling Championships. There, the team finished the round robin with a 6–4 record. They then won a tiebreaker, and the semifinal before losing to Manitoba (Mackenzie Zacharias) in the final.

In university curling, Papley played the University of Alberta Pandas women's team. With UAlberta, she won a gold medal at the 2018 U Sports/Curling Canada University Curling Championships as the team's alternate. The team, which was skipped by Kristen Streifel represented Canada at the 2019 Winter Universiade. Papley only played in one game at the event, and the team finished in 5th. Papley won another national university gold medal at the 2020 U Sports/Curling Canada University Curling Championships, playing lead for the Pandas (skipped by Sturmay). Following the cancellation of the 2022 national championship due to the COVID-19 pandemic in Canada, the team, now skipped by Marks, had to play in 2022 World University Games Qualifier later in the season. There, the team won the gold medal, qualifying the University of Alberta women's team for the 2023 Winter World University Games. There, the team finished with a 4–5 record, missing the playoffs.

=== Mixed ===
In mixed doubles curling, Papley and partner Evan van Amsterdam played in the 2023 Canadian Mixed Doubles Curling Championship, finishing with a 3–4 record in pool play. That year, she also played lead on van Amsterdam's four-player mixed team. The team won the 2023 Alberta Mixed Curling Championship. The team represented Alberta at the 2023 Canadian Mixed Curling Championship. There, the team finished with a 6–4 record, missing the playoffs.

Papley at van Amsterdam also played in the 2024 Canadian Mixed Doubles Curling Championship, where they finished with a pool play record of 5–2. This put the pair into the playoffs where they lost to Jocelyn Peterman and Brett Gallant in the quarterfinals.

=== Women's ===
After juniors, Papley joined back up with Sturmay in 2021, throwing lead stones for her. The team played in their first provincial women's championship at the 2022 Alberta Scotties Tournament of Hearts. The team did not fare well there, finishing 2–5. The team played at the 2023 Alberta Hearts, but Papley missed the event to play at the University Games. The next season, the rink played in their first Grand Slam at the 2024 Canadian Open when Team Stefania Constantini withdrew for medical reasons. There, the team finished with a 1–3 record in pool play, missing the playoffs. The team played in the 2024 Alberta Scotties Tournament of Hearts, going 6–1 after the round robin. This put them in the final, where they beat Kayla Skrlik to send the rink to the 2024 Scotties Tournament of Hearts, Canada's national women's curling championship, played in her home province. This was Papley's first trip to the national Scotties. At the Hearts, Team Sturmay led their pool with a 7–1 record. In the playoffs, they lost their first game to Jennifer Jones, but rebounded to defeat Kaitlyn Lawes in the 3 vs. 4 page playoff qualifier. In the 3 vs. 4 game, they team lost to another team from Manitoba in Kate Cameron. The following season, in a change to the qualification process, three teams in the field at the Scotties Tournament of Hearts pre-qualified for the 2025 Scotties based on their 2023–24 Canadian Team Ranking Standings, and Curling Canada announced Sturmay would be one of these teams, which meant they bypassed and did not have to play in the 2025 Alberta provincial championship. At the 2025 Scotties, Team Sturmay would finish 4–4 after round robin play, failing to qualify for the playoffs.

Team Sturmay's success over the 2023–25 seasons and Canadian Team Ranking Standings qualified Sturmay for the 2025 Canadian Olympic Curling Pre-Trials. At the 2025 Pre-Trials, the Sturmay rink would win the event, finishing first in the round robin with a 5–2 record and then beating Kayla MacMillan 2 games to 1 in the best-of-three final. This would qualify the rink for the 2025 Canadian Olympic Curling Trials, with a shot to represent Canada at the 2026 Winter Olympics. There, Sturmay would finish with a 4–3 record, finishing 4th and just missing out on the playoffs. Team Sturmay would continue their success, winning the 2026 Alberta Women's Curling Championship, beating Serena Gray-Withers 9–5 in the final, qualifying Sturmay to represent Alberta at the 2026 Scotties Tournament of Hearts. At the 2026 Scotties, Sturmay would improve on their previous performances, going 6–2 in the round-robin, and qualify for the playoffs. After beating Nova Scotia's Christina Black in the 3v4 game, Sturmay would then lose to Kerri Einarson 12–5 in the semifinal, winning the bronze medal.

== Personal life ==
Papley is employed in specification sales with WOW Lighting and Controls. She is in a relationship with her mixed doubles partner, Evan van Amsterdam. She is originally from Leduc County near Beaumont, Alberta, and attended École Secondaire Beaumont Composite High School. At the University of Alberta, Papley took Earth and Atmospheric Sciences.
