= 2021 Curlers Corner Autumn Gold Curling Classic =

- Host city: Calgary, Alberta
- Arena: Calgary Curling Club
- Dates: October 8–11
- Winner: (United States) Team Peterson
- Curling club: Chaska CC, Chaska
- Skip: Tabitha Peterson
- Third: Nina Roth
- Second: Becca Hamilton
- Lead: Tara Peterson
- Coach: Laine Peters
- Finalist: (Japan) Satsuki Fujisawa

The 2021 Curlers Corner Autumn Gold Curling Classic was held from October 8 to 11 at the Calgary Curling Club in Calgary, Alberta. The event was held in a triple-knockout format with a purse of $44,000.

After dropping into the C Event, the United States' Team Tabitha Peterson won five straight sudden death games to claim the title. In the final, they defeated Japan's Satsuki Fujisawa 7–5.

== Teams ==
The teams are listed as follows:

| Skip | Third | Second | Lead | Alternate | Locale |
|---|---|---|---|---|---|
| Sherry Anderson | Nancy Martin | Chaelynn Kitz | Breanne Knapp | | Saskatoon, Saskatchewan |
| Ryleigh Bakker | Madison Johnson | Kaitlyn Zeiler | Cameron Kuzma | Sydney Libbus | Calgary, Alberta |
| Penny Barker | Christie Gamble | Jenna Enge | Danielle Sicinski | | Moose Jaw, Saskatchewan |
| Cheryl Bernard | Carolyn McRorie | Laine Peters | Karen Ruus | | Calgary, Alberta |
| Lindsay Bertsch | Nicole Larson | Valerie Ekelund | Hope Sunley | | Calgary, Alberta |
| Claire Booth | Kaylee Raniseth | Raelyn Helston | Kate Ector | | Red Deer, Alberta |
| Corryn Brown | Erin Pincott | Dezaray Hawes | Samantha Fisher | | Kamloops, British Columbia |
| Chelsea Carey | Jolene Campbell | Stephanie Schmidt | Jennifer Armstrong | | Regina, Saskatchewan |
| Cory Christensen | Sarah Anderson | Vicky Persinger | Taylor Anderson | | (United States) Chaska, Minnesota |
| Elysa Crough | Quinn Prodaniuk | Kim Bonneau | Julianna Mackenzie | | Edmonton, Alberta |
| Kerri Einarson | Val Sweeting | Shannon Birchard | Briane Meilleur | | Gimli, Manitoba |
| Tracy Fleury | Selena Njegovan | Liz Fyfe | Kristin MacCuish | | East St. Paul, Manitoba |
| Satsuki Fujisawa | Chinami Yoshida | Yumi Suzuki | Yurika Yoshida | | Kitami, Japan |
| Gim Un-chi | Seol Ye-ji | Kim Su-ji | Seol Ye-eun | Park You-been | Uijeongbu, South Korea |
| Emily Haupstein | Skylar Ackerman | Taylor Stremick | Abbey Johnson | | Saskatoon, Saskatchewan |
| Amber Holland | Kim Schneider | Karlee Korchinski | Debbie Lozinski | | Kronau, Saskatchewan |
| Rachel Homan | Emma Miskew | Sarah Wilkes | Joanne Courtney | | Ottawa, Ontario |
| Daniela Jentsch | Emira Abbes | Klara-Hermine Fomm | Analena Jentsch | | Füssen, Germany |
| Jennifer Jones | Kaitlyn Lawes | Jocelyn Peterman | Dawn McEwen | | Winnipeg, Manitoba |
| Rebecca Morrison (Note: As part of the nine-player national squad, Teams Gina Aitken and Eve Muirhead formed two new teams named GB Red and GB Blue. Rebecca Morrison skipped GB Red and Eve Muirhead skipped GB Blue.) | Lauren Gray | Gina Aitken | Sophie Sinclair | | Stirling, Scotland |
| Eve Muirhead | Vicky Wright | Jennifer Dodds | Mili Smith | Hailey Duff | Stirling, Scotland |
| Tabitha Peterson | Nina Roth | Becca Hamilton | Tara Peterson | | (United States) Chaska, Minnesota |
| Darcy Robertson | Laura Burtnyk | Gaetanne Gauthier | Krysten Karwacki | | Winnipeg, Manitoba |
| Kelsey Rocque | Danielle Schmiemann | Dana Ferguson | Rachelle Brown | | Edmonton, Alberta |
| Casey Scheidegger | Cary-Anne McTaggart | Jessie Haughian | Kristie Moore | | Lethbridge, Alberta |
| Marla Sherrer | Chantele Broderson | Julie Selvais | Sarah Drummond | | Lacombe, Alberta |
| Jessie Hunkin (Note: As skip Robyn Silvernagle was on maternity leave, second Jessie Hunkin moved up to skip and alternate Becca Hebert played second.) | Kristen Streifel | Becca Hebert | Dayna Demers | | North Battleford, Saskatchewan |
| Jamie Sinclair | Monica Walker | Cora Farrell | Elizabeth Cousins | | (United States) Charlotte, North Carolina |
| Kayla Skrlik | Geri-Lynn Ramsay | Brittany Tran | Ashton Skrlik | | Calgary, Alberta |
| Selena Sturmay | Abby Marks | Catherine Clifford | Paige Papley | Kate Goodhelpsen | Edmonton, Alberta |
| Laura Walker | Kate Cameron | Taylor McDonald | Nadine Scotland | | Edmonton, Alberta |
| Jessica Wytrychowski | Jessica Koch | Krista Shortridge | Cheryl Damen | | Airdrie, Alberta |

== Knockout brackets ==
=== A event ===
First Knockout | Qualifier 1
(Manitoba) Tracy Fleury | 7
(Alberta) Ryleigh Bakker | 6 | (Manitoba) Tracy Fleury | 7
(Saskatchewan) Sherry Anderson | 4 | (Saskatchewan) Penny Barker | 5
(Saskatchewan) Penny Barker | 5 | (Manitoba) Tracy Fleury | 7
(Alberta) Laura Walker | 6 | (Scotland) GB Red | 5
(Alberta) Marla Sherrer | 7 | (Alberta) Marla Sherrer | 4
(British Columbia) Corryn Brown | 3 | (Scotland) GB Red | 5
(Scotland) GB Red | 6 | (Manitoba) Tracy Fleury | 2
(Manitoba) Jennifer Jones | 9 | (Scotland) GB Blue | 9
(Alberta) Cheryl Bernard | 5 | (Manitoba) Jennifer Jones | 7
(United States) Cory Christensen | 2 | (Saskatchewan) Team Silvernagle | 2
(Saskatchewan) Team Silvernagle | 8 | (Manitoba) Jennifer Jones | 3
(Scotland) GB Blue | 8 | (Scotland) GB Blue | 5
(Saskatchewan) Emily Haupstein | 2 | (Scotland) GB Blue | 8
(South Korea) Gim Un-chi | 4 | (Saskatchewan) Amber Holland | 4
(Saskatchewan) Amber Holland | 5

First Knockout | Qualifier 2
(Manitoba) Kerri Einarson | 12
(Alberta) Claire Booth | 1 | (Manitoba) Kerri Einarson | 11
(Manitoba) Darcy Robertson | 7 | (Manitoba) Darcy Robertson | 2
(Saskatchewan) Chelsea Carey | 3 | (Manitoba) Kerri Einarson | 5
(Alberta) Kelsey Rocque | 6 | (United States) Tabitha Peterson | 7
(Alberta) Selena Sturmay | 4 | (Alberta) Kelsey Rocque | 2
(United States) Tabitha Peterson | 10 | (United States) Tabitha Peterson | 7
(Alberta) Kayla Skrlik | 3 | (United States) Tabitha Peterson | 5
(Ontario) Rachel Homan | 9 | (Japan) Satsuki Fujisawa | 8
(Alberta) Jessica Wytrychowski | 3 | (Ontario) Rachel Homan | 8
(Alberta) Casey Scheidegger | 5 | (Alberta) Casey Scheidegger | 0
(Alberta) Lindsay Bertsch | 3 | (Ontario) Rachel Homan | 4
(Japan) Satsuki Fujisawa | 8 | (Japan) Satsuki Fujisawa | 7
(Alberta) Elysa Crough | 2 | (Japan) Satsuki Fujisawa | 6
(Germany) Daniela Jentsch | 8 | (Germany) Daniela Jentsch | 1
(United States) Jamie Sinclair | 7

=== B event ===
Second Knockout | To Qualifier 3
(Germany) Daniela Jentsch | 9
(Alberta) Ryleigh Bakker | 5 | (Alberta) Ryleigh Bakker | 1
(Saskatchewan) Sherry Anderson | 4 | (Germany) Daniela Jentsch | 4
(Manitoba) Kerri Einarson | 8
(Manitoba) Kerri Einarson | 4
(Manitoba) Jennifer Jones | 5
(Alberta) Casey Scheidegger | 4
(British Columbia) Corryn Brown | 8 | (British Columbia) Corryn Brown | 7
(Alberta) Laura Walker | 2 | (British Columbia) Corryn Brown | 4 | Qualifier 3
(Manitoba) Jennifer Jones | 5
(Manitoba) Jennifer Jones | 7
(South Korea) Gim Un-chi | 8

Second Knockout | To Qualifier 3
(Alberta) Kelsey Rocque | 2
(Alberta) Cheryl Bernard | 5 | (United States) Cory Christensen | 7
(United States) Cory Christensen | 8 | (United States) Cory Christensen | 3
(South Korea) Gim Un-chi | 4
(Manitoba) Darcy Robertson | 9
(Saskatchewan) Emily Haupstein | 4 | (South Korea) Gim Un-chi | 10
(South Korea) Gim Un-chi | 6 | (South Korea) Gim Un-chi | 6
(Manitoba) Tracy Fleury | 5

Second Knockout | To Qualifier 4
(Saskatchewan) Amber Holland | 4
(Alberta) Claire Booth | 7 | (Saskatchewan) Chelsea Carey | 8
(Saskatchewan) Chelsea Carey | 8 | (Saskatchewan) Chelsea Carey | 5
(Ontario) Rachel Homan | 3
(Saskatchewan) Chelsea Carey | 8
(Scotland) GB Red | 2
(Saskatchewan) Team Silvernagle | 0
(Alberta) Selena Sturmay | 4 | (Alberta) Kayla Skrlik | 7
(Alberta) Kayla Skrlik | 5 | (Alberta) Kayla Skrlik | 5 | Qualifier 4
(Scotland) GB Red | 8
(Saskatchewan) Chelsea Carey | 9
(United States) Jamie Sinclair | 7

Second Knockout | To Qualifier 4
(Alberta) Marla Sherrer | 7
(Alberta) Jessica Wytrychowski | 6 | (Alberta) Jessica Wytrychowski | 2
(Alberta) Lindsay Bertsch | 5 | (Alberta) Marla Sherrer | 3
(United States) Jamie Sinclair | 9
(Saskatchewan) Penny Barker | 5
(Alberta) Elysa Crough | 4 | (United States) Jamie Sinclair | 8
(United States) Jamie Sinclair | 11 | (United States) Jamie Sinclair | 6
(United States) Tabitha Peterson | 5

=== C event ===
Third Knockout | Qualifier 5
(Ontario) Rachel Homan | 8
(Saskatchewan) Sherry Anderson | 8 | (Saskatchewan) Sherry Anderson | 5
(Alberta) Laura Walker | 5 | (Ontario) Rachel Homan | 6
(Alberta) Kayla Skrlik | 5
(Alberta) Kayla Skrlik | 7
(Alberta) Cheryl Bernard | 4 | (Saskatchewan) Emily Haupstein | 6
(Saskatchewan) Emily Haupstein | 6 | (Ontario) Rachel Homan | 3
(Manitoba) Jennifer Jones | 6

Third Knockout | Qualifier 6
(Germany) Daniela Jentsch | 5
(Alberta) Claire Booth | 4 | (Alberta) Selena Sturmay | 9
(Alberta) Selena Sturmay | 6 | (Alberta) Selena Sturmay | 4
(British Columbia) Corryn Brown | 3
(British Columbia) Corryn Brown | 6
(Alberta) Lindsay Bertsch | 2 | (Alberta) Elysa Crough | 2
(Alberta) Elysa Crough | 9 | (Alberta) Selena Sturmay | 2
(United States) Jamie Sinclair | 6

Third Knockout | Qualifier 7
(Alberta) Ryleigh Bakker | 4
(Alberta) Casey Scheidegger | 6
(Alberta) Casey Scheidegger | 1
(United States) Tabitha Peterson | 8
(United States) Tabitha Peterson | 7
(Alberta) Kelsey Rocque | 5
(Alberta) Marla Sherrer | 1
(Alberta) Kelsey Rocque | 6 | (Alberta) Kelsey Rocque | 9
(Manitoba) Darcy Robertson | 2 | (Alberta) Kelsey Rocque | 6
(Scotland) GB Red | 4

Third Knockout | Qualifier 8
(United States) Cory Christensen | 2
(Alberta) Jessica Wytrychowski | 6 | (Saskatchewan) Penny Barker | 7
(Saskatchewan) Penny Barker | 7 | (Saskatchewan) Penny Barker | 3
(Manitoba) Kerri Einarson | 6
(Manitoba) Kerri Einarson | 2
(Manitoba) Tracy Fleury | 4
(Saskatchewan) Amber Holland | 7
(Saskatchewan) Team Silvernagle | 5
(Saskatchewan) Amber Holland | 7
(Manitoba) Tracy Fleury | 10

== Knockout results ==
All draw times listed in Mountain Daylight Time (UTC-06:00).

=== Draw 1 ===
Friday, October 8, 9:30 am

| Sheet 1 | 1 | 2 | 3 | 4 | 5 | 6 | 7 | 8 | 9 | Final |
| (Manitoba) Tracy Fleury 🔨 | 2 | 0 | 0 | 0 | 1 | 0 | 2 | 1 | 1 | 7 |
| (Alberta) Ryleigh Bakker | 0 | 2 | 1 | 1 | 0 | 2 | 0 | 0 | 0 | 6 |

| Sheet 2 | 1 | 2 | 3 | 4 | 5 | 6 | 7 | 8 | Final |
| (Saskatchewan) Sherry Anderson | 0 | 1 | 1 | 0 | 1 | 0 | 1 | 0 | 4 |
| (Saskatchewan) Penny Barker 🔨 | 2 | 0 | 0 | 1 | 0 | 1 | 0 | 1 | 5 |

| Sheet 3 | 1 | 2 | 3 | 4 | 5 | 6 | 7 | 8 | 9 | Final |
| (Alberta) Laura Walker 🔨 | 2 | 1 | 0 | 0 | 0 | 0 | 3 | 0 | 0 | 6 |
| (Alberta) Marla Sherrer | 0 | 0 | 2 | 1 | 1 | 1 | 0 | 1 | 1 | 7 |

| Sheet 4 | 1 | 2 | 3 | 4 | 5 | 6 | 7 | 8 | Final |
| (British Columbia) Corryn Brown | 0 | 0 | 1 | 1 | 0 | 0 | 1 | X | 3 |
| (Scotland) GB Red 🔨 | 2 | 1 | 0 | 0 | 1 | 2 | 0 | X | 6 |

| Sheet 5 | 1 | 2 | 3 | 4 | 5 | 6 | 7 | 8 | Final |
| (South Korea) Gim Un-chi | 0 | 1 | 1 | 0 | 1 | 0 | 1 | 0 | 4 |
| (Saskatchewan) Amber Holland 🔨 | 1 | 0 | 0 | 1 | 0 | 1 | 0 | 2 | 5 |

| Sheet 6 | 1 | 2 | 3 | 4 | 5 | 6 | 7 | 8 | Final |
| (Scotland) GB Blue | 0 | 2 | 0 | 2 | 3 | 1 | X | X | 8 |
| (Saskatchewan) Emily Haupstein 🔨 | 1 | 0 | 1 | 0 | 0 | 0 | X | X | 2 |

| Sheet 7 | 1 | 2 | 3 | 4 | 5 | 6 | 7 | 8 | Final |
| (United States) Cory Christensen | 0 | 0 | 2 | 0 | 0 | 0 | X | X | 2 |
| (Saskatchewan) Team Silvernagle 🔨 | 1 | 3 | 0 | 2 | 1 | 1 | X | X | 8 |

| Sheet 8 | 1 | 2 | 3 | 4 | 5 | 6 | 7 | 8 | Final |
| (Manitoba) Jennifer Jones | 0 | 0 | 2 | 2 | 0 | 2 | 2 | 1 | 9 |
| (Alberta) Cheryl Bernard 🔨 | 2 | 1 | 0 | 0 | 2 | 0 | 0 | 0 | 5 |

=== Draw 2 ===
Friday, October 8, 1:15 pm

| Sheet 1 | 1 | 2 | 3 | 4 | 5 | 6 | 7 | 8 | Final |
| (Manitoba) Kerri Einarson | 1 | 3 | 5 | 0 | 3 | X | X | X | 12 |
| (Alberta) Claire Booth 🔨 | 0 | 0 | 0 | 1 | 0 | X | X | X | 1 |

| Sheet 2 | 1 | 2 | 3 | 4 | 5 | 6 | 7 | 8 | Final |
| (Manitoba) Darcy Robertson 🔨 | 0 | 1 | 1 | 0 | 3 | 0 | 2 | X | 7 |
| (Saskatchewan) Chelsea Carey | 1 | 0 | 0 | 0 | 0 | 2 | 0 | X | 3 |

| Sheet 3 | 1 | 2 | 3 | 4 | 5 | 6 | 7 | 8 | Final |
| (Alberta) Kelsey Rocque 🔨 | 0 | 1 | 0 | 1 | 0 | 3 | 0 | 1 | 6 |
| (Alberta) Selena Sturmay | 1 | 0 | 1 | 0 | 1 | 0 | 1 | 0 | 4 |

| Sheet 4 | 1 | 2 | 3 | 4 | 5 | 6 | 7 | 8 | Final |
| (United States) Tabitha Peterson | 0 | 2 | 1 | 2 | 0 | 5 | X | X | 10 |
| (Alberta) Kayla Skrlik 🔨 | 1 | 0 | 0 | 0 | 2 | 0 | X | X | 3 |

| Sheet 5 | 1 | 2 | 3 | 4 | 5 | 6 | 7 | 8 | Final |
| (Germany) Daniela Jentsch | 0 | 3 | 0 | 3 | 0 | 1 | 0 | 1 | 8 |
| (United States) Jamie Sinclair 🔨 | 2 | 0 | 2 | 0 | 2 | 0 | 1 | 0 | 7 |

| Sheet 6 | 1 | 2 | 3 | 4 | 5 | 6 | 7 | 8 | Final |
| (Japan) Satsuki Fujisawa | 1 | 2 | 0 | 0 | 4 | 1 | X | X | 8 |
| (Alberta) Elysa Crough 🔨 | 0 | 0 | 1 | 1 | 0 | 0 | X | X | 2 |

| Sheet 7 | 1 | 2 | 3 | 4 | 5 | 6 | 7 | 8 | Final |
| (Ontario) Rachel Homan | 3 | 0 | 2 | 3 | 0 | 0 | 1 | X | 9 |
| (Alberta) Jessica Wytrychowski 🔨 | 0 | 2 | 0 | 0 | 1 | 0 | 0 | X | 3 |

| Sheet 8 | 1 | 2 | 3 | 4 | 5 | 6 | 7 | 8 | Final |
| (Alberta) Casey Scheidegger 🔨 | 0 | 0 | 2 | 1 | 1 | 0 | 0 | 1 | 5 |
| (Alberta) Lindsay Bertsch | 0 | 1 | 0 | 0 | 0 | 2 | 0 | 0 | 3 |

=== Draw 3 ===
Friday, October 8, 5:15 pm

| Sheet 1 | 1 | 2 | 3 | 4 | 5 | 6 | 7 | 8 | Final |
| (Scotland) GB Blue 🔨 | 2 | 2 | 1 | 0 | 2 | 0 | 1 | X | 8 |
| (Saskatchewan) Amber Holland | 0 | 0 | 0 | 1 | 0 | 3 | 0 | X | 4 |

| Sheet 2 | 1 | 2 | 3 | 4 | 5 | 6 | 7 | 8 | Final |
| (Manitoba) Jennifer Jones | 2 | 0 | 3 | 0 | 1 | 1 | X | X | 7 |
| (Saskatchewan) Team Silvernagle 🔨 | 0 | 1 | 0 | 1 | 0 | 0 | X | X | 2 |

| Sheet 3 | 1 | 2 | 3 | 4 | 5 | 6 | 7 | 8 | Final |
| (Alberta) Cheryl Bernard 🔨 | 0 | 2 | 0 | 0 | 2 | 1 | 0 | X | 5 |
| (United States) Cory Christensen | 3 | 0 | 3 | 1 | 0 | 0 | 1 | X | 8 |

| Sheet 4 | 1 | 2 | 3 | 4 | 5 | 6 | 7 | 8 | Final |
| (Saskatchewan) Emily Haupstein | 0 | 2 | 1 | 0 | 0 | 0 | 1 | 0 | 4 |
| (South Korea) Gim Un-chi 🔨 | 1 | 0 | 0 | 3 | 1 | 0 | 0 | 1 | 6 |

| Sheet 5 | 1 | 2 | 3 | 4 | 5 | 6 | 7 | 8 | Final |
| (Alberta) Ryleigh Bakker 🔨 | 1 | 3 | 0 | 0 | 0 | 0 | 1 | 0 | 5 |
| (Saskatchewan) Sherry Anderson | 0 | 0 | 0 | 1 | 1 | 1 | 0 | 1 | 4 |

| Sheet 6 | 1 | 2 | 3 | 4 | 5 | 6 | 7 | 8 | Final |
| (British Columbia) Corryn Brown | 0 | 3 | 1 | 0 | 3 | 1 | X | X | 8 |
| (Alberta) Laura Walker 🔨 | 1 | 0 | 0 | 1 | 0 | 0 | X | X | 2 |

| Sheet 7 | 1 | 2 | 3 | 4 | 5 | 6 | 7 | 8 | Final |
| (Manitoba) Tracy Fleury 🔨 | 0 | 1 | 0 | 2 | 0 | 1 | 0 | 3 | 7 |
| (Saskatchewan) Penny Barker | 0 | 0 | 2 | 0 | 2 | 0 | 1 | 0 | 5 |

| Sheet 8 | 1 | 2 | 3 | 4 | 5 | 6 | 7 | 8 | Final |
| (Alberta) Marla Sherrer 🔨 | 2 | 0 | 1 | 0 | 0 | 0 | 1 | 0 | 4 |
| (Scotland) GB Red | 0 | 1 | 0 | 1 | 1 | 1 | 0 | 1 | 5 |

=== Draw 4 ===
Friday, October 8, 9:00 pm

| Sheet 1 | 1 | 2 | 3 | 4 | 5 | 6 | 7 | 8 | Final |
| (Japan) Satsuki Fujisawa 🔨 | 2 | 0 | 0 | 1 | 0 | 2 | 1 | X | 6 |
| (Germany) Daniela Jentsch | 0 | 0 | 0 | 0 | 1 | 0 | 0 | X | 1 |

| Sheet 2 | 1 | 2 | 3 | 4 | 5 | 6 | 7 | 8 | Final |
| (Ontario) Rachel Homan 🔨 | 2 | 2 | 1 | 3 | X | X | X | X | 8 |
| (Alberta) Casey Scheidegger | 0 | 0 | 0 | 0 | X | X | X | X | 0 |

| Sheet 3 | 1 | 2 | 3 | 4 | 5 | 6 | 7 | 8 | Final |
| (Alberta) Jessica Wytrychowski | 0 | 0 | 2 | 0 | 3 | 0 | 0 | 1 | 6 |
| (Alberta) Lindsay Bertsch 🔨 | 0 | 1 | 0 | 1 | 0 | 2 | 1 | 0 | 5 |

| Sheet 4 | 1 | 2 | 3 | 4 | 5 | 6 | 7 | 8 | Final |
| (Alberta) Elysa Crough | 0 | 2 | 0 | 0 | 0 | 2 | 0 | X | 4 |
| (United States) Jamie Sinclair 🔨 | 3 | 0 | 1 | 3 | 1 | 0 | 3 | X | 11 |

| Sheet 5 | 1 | 2 | 3 | 4 | 5 | 6 | 7 | 8 | 9 | Final |
| (Alberta) Claire Booth | 1 | 0 | 1 | 1 | 0 | 0 | 3 | 1 | 0 | 7 |
| (Saskatchewan) Chelsea Carey 🔨 | 0 | 2 | 0 | 0 | 2 | 3 | 0 | 0 | 1 | 8 |

| Sheet 6 | 1 | 2 | 3 | 4 | 5 | 6 | 7 | 8 | Final |
| (Alberta) Selena Sturmay | 1 | 0 | 1 | 0 | 1 | 1 | 0 | 0 | 4 |
| (Alberta) Kayla Skrlik 🔨 | 0 | 1 | 0 | 1 | 0 | 0 | 1 | 2 | 5 |

| Sheet 7 | 1 | 2 | 3 | 4 | 5 | 6 | 7 | 8 | Final |
| (Manitoba) Kerri Einarson | 0 | 2 | 1 | 0 | 3 | 5 | X | X | 11 |
| (Manitoba) Darcy Robertson 🔨 | 1 | 0 | 0 | 1 | 0 | 0 | X | X | 2 |

| Sheet 8 | 1 | 2 | 3 | 4 | 5 | 6 | 7 | 8 | Final |
| (Alberta) Kelsey Rocque 🔨 | 1 | 0 | 0 | 0 | 1 | 0 | X | X | 2 |
| (United States) Tabitha Peterson | 0 | 2 | 1 | 3 | 0 | 1 | X | X | 7 |

=== Draw 5 ===
Saturday, October 9, 9:00 am

| Sheet 1 | 1 | 2 | 3 | 4 | 5 | 6 | 7 | 8 | Final |
| (Alberta) Casey Scheidegger 🔨 | 1 | 0 | 0 | 2 | 0 | 1 | 0 | 0 | 4 |
| (British Columbia) Corryn Brown | 0 | 1 | 1 | 0 | 3 | 0 | 1 | 1 | 7 |

| Sheet 3 | 1 | 2 | 3 | 4 | 5 | 6 | 7 | 8 | Final |
| (Germany) Daniela Jentsch 🔨 | 2 | 1 | 1 | 1 | 0 | 1 | 3 | X | 9 |
| (Alberta) Ryleigh Bakker | 0 | 0 | 0 | 0 | 1 | 0 | 0 | X | 1 |

| Sheet 4 | 1 | 2 | 3 | 4 | 5 | 6 | 7 | 8 | Final |
| (Manitoba) Jennifer Jones | 0 | 1 | 1 | 1 | 0 | 0 | 0 | 0 | 3 |
| (Scotland) GB Blue 🔨 | 3 | 0 | 0 | 0 | 0 | 1 | 0 | 1 | 5 |

| Sheet 5 | 1 | 2 | 3 | 4 | 5 | 6 | 7 | 8 | Final |
| (Manitoba) Tracy Fleury 🔨 | 1 | 2 | 0 | 2 | 1 | 0 | 1 | 0 | 7 |
| (Scotland) GB Red | 0 | 0 | 2 | 0 | 0 | 2 | 0 | 1 | 5 |

| Sheet 6 | 1 | 2 | 3 | 4 | 5 | 6 | 7 | 8 | Final |
| (Alberta) Kelsey Rocque 🔨 | 1 | 0 | 0 | 0 | 1 | 0 | X | X | 2 |
| (United States) Cory Christensen | 0 | 3 | 1 | 2 | 0 | 1 | X | X | 7 |

| Sheet 8 | 1 | 2 | 3 | 4 | 5 | 6 | 7 | 8 | 9 | Final |
| (Manitoba) Darcy Robertson 🔨 | 1 | 0 | 3 | 0 | 0 | 3 | 0 | 2 | 0 | 9 |
| (South Korea) Gim Un-chi | 0 | 3 | 0 | 3 | 1 | 0 | 2 | 0 | 1 | 10 |

=== Draw 6 ===
Saturday, October 9, 12:45 pm

| Sheet 1 | 1 | 2 | 3 | 4 | 5 | 6 | 7 | 8 | Final |
| (Saskatchewan) Team Silvernagle | 0 | 0 | 0 | 0 | 0 | 0 | X | X | 0 |
| (Alberta) Kayla Skrlik 🔨 | 1 | 1 | 1 | 1 | 1 | 2 | X | X | 7 |

| Sheet 2 | 1 | 2 | 3 | 4 | 5 | 6 | 7 | 8 | Final |
| (Alberta) Marla Sherrer 🔨 | 1 | 1 | 0 | 3 | 0 | 2 | X | X | 7 |
| (Alberta) Jessica Wytrychowski | 0 | 0 | 1 | 0 | 1 | 0 | X | X | 2 |

| Sheet 4 | 1 | 2 | 3 | 4 | 5 | 6 | 7 | 8 | Final |
| (Ontario) Rachel Homan | 0 | 2 | 0 | 0 | 0 | 2 | 0 | X | 4 |
| (Japan) Satsuki Fujisawa 🔨 | 2 | 0 | 1 | 1 | 1 | 0 | 2 | X | 7 |

| Sheet 5 | 1 | 2 | 3 | 4 | 5 | 6 | 7 | 8 | Final |
| (Manitoba) Kerri Einarson 🔨 | 2 | 0 | 2 | 0 | 1 | 0 | 0 | X | 5 |
| (United States) Tabitha Peterson | 0 | 2 | 0 | 2 | 0 | 2 | 1 | X | 7 |

| Sheet 7 | 1 | 2 | 3 | 4 | 5 | 6 | 7 | 8 | Final |
| (Saskatchewan) Amber Holland | 0 | 0 | 2 | 1 | 0 | 1 | 0 | X | 4 |
| (Saskatchewan) Chelsea Carey 🔨 | 1 | 2 | 0 | 0 | 2 | 0 | 3 | X | 8 |

| Sheet 8 | 1 | 2 | 3 | 4 | 5 | 6 | 7 | 8 | Final |
| (Saskatchewan) Penny Barker 🔨 | 0 | 1 | 0 | 2 | 0 | 2 | 0 | 0 | 5 |
| (United States) Jamie Sinclair | 0 | 0 | 3 | 0 | 2 | 0 | 2 | 1 | 8 |

=== Draw 7 ===
Saturday, October 9, 4:30 pm

| Sheet 1 | 1 | 2 | 3 | 4 | 5 | 6 | 7 | 8 | Final |
| (Germany) Daniela Jentsch 🔨 | 0 | 1 | 0 | 2 | 0 | 1 | 0 | X | 4 |
| (Manitoba) Kerri Einarson | 0 | 0 | 3 | 0 | 2 | 0 | 3 | X | 8 |

| Sheet 2 | 1 | 2 | 3 | 4 | 5 | 6 | 7 | 8 | Final |
| (Alberta) Lindsay Bertsch | 0 | 0 | 0 | 2 | 0 | X | X | X | 2 |
| (Alberta) Elysa Crough 🔨 | 2 | 2 | 4 | 0 | 1 | X | X | X | 9 |

| Sheet 3 | 1 | 2 | 3 | 4 | 5 | 6 | 7 | 8 | Final |
| (British Columbia) Corryn Brown 🔨 | 1 | 0 | 0 | 2 | 0 | 1 | 0 | 0 | 4 |
| (Manitoba) Jennifer Jones | 0 | 1 | 1 | 0 | 1 | 0 | 1 | 1 | 5 |

| Sheet 4 | 1 | 2 | 3 | 4 | 5 | 6 | 7 | 8 | Final |
| (Alberta) Kelsey Rocque 🔨 | 2 | 0 | 0 | 2 | 0 | 0 | 2 | X | 6 |
| (Manitoba) Darcy Robertson | 0 | 0 | 1 | 0 | 0 | 1 | 0 | X | 2 |

| Sheet 6 | 1 | 2 | 3 | 4 | 5 | 6 | 7 | 8 | Final |
| (Alberta) Jessica Wytrychowski 🔨 | 0 | 0 | 1 | 0 | 3 | 0 | 1 | 1 | 6 |
| (Saskatchewan) Penny Barker | 0 | 3 | 0 | 1 | 0 | 3 | 0 | 0 | 7 |

| Sheet 7 | 1 | 2 | 3 | 4 | 5 | 6 | 7 | 8 | Final |
| (United States) Cory Christensen | 0 | 0 | 1 | 0 | 0 | 1 | 1 | 0 | 3 |
| (South Korea) Gim Un-chi 🔨 | 0 | 1 | 0 | 1 | 1 | 0 | 0 | 1 | 4 |

| Sheet 8 | 1 | 2 | 3 | 4 | 5 | 6 | 7 | 8 | Final |
| (Manitoba) Tracy Fleury 🔨 | 1 | 0 | 0 | 1 | 0 | 0 | X | X | 2 |
| (Scotland) GB Blue | 0 | 3 | 2 | 0 | 1 | 3 | X | X | 9 |

=== Draw 8 ===
Saturday, October 9, 8:15 pm

| Sheet 2 | 1 | 2 | 3 | 4 | 5 | 6 | 7 | 8 | Final |
| (Saskatchewan) Chelsea Carey | 0 | 1 | 1 | 1 | 0 | 0 | 1 | 1 | 5 |
| (Ontario) Rachel Homan 🔨 | 0 | 0 | 0 | 0 | 3 | 0 | 0 | 0 | 3 |

| Sheet 3 | 1 | 2 | 3 | 4 | 5 | 6 | 7 | 8 | Final |
| (Alberta) Claire Booth | 0 | 0 | 1 | 0 | 1 | 0 | 2 | X | 4 |
| (Alberta) Selena Sturmay 🔨 | 2 | 1 | 0 | 2 | 0 | 1 | 0 | X | 6 |

| Sheet 4 | 1 | 2 | 3 | 4 | 5 | 6 | 7 | 8 | Final |
| (Alberta) Kayla Skrlik 🔨 | 2 | 1 | 0 | 0 | 0 | 2 | 0 | 0 | 5 |
| (Scotland) GB Red | 0 | 0 | 2 | 2 | 2 | 0 | 0 | 2 | 8 |

| Sheet 5 | 1 | 2 | 3 | 4 | 5 | 6 | 7 | 8 | Final |
| (Alberta) Cheryl Bernard | 1 | 1 | 0 | 1 | 0 | 1 | 0 | 0 | 4 |
| (Saskatchewan) Emily Haupstein 🔨 | 0 | 0 | 1 | 0 | 4 | 0 | 0 | 1 | 6 |

| Sheet 6 | 1 | 2 | 3 | 4 | 5 | 6 | 7 | 8 | Final |
| (Alberta) Marla Sherrer | 0 | 1 | 0 | 2 | 0 | 0 | X | X | 3 |
| (United States) Jamie Sinclair 🔨 | 2 | 0 | 3 | 0 | 2 | 2 | X | X | 9 |

| Sheet 7 | 1 | 2 | 3 | 4 | 5 | 6 | 7 | 8 | Final |
| (Saskatchewan) Sherry Anderson 🔨 | 1 | 0 | 3 | 0 | 2 | 0 | 2 | X | 8 |
| (Alberta) Laura Walker | 0 | 1 | 0 | 3 | 0 | 1 | 0 | X | 5 |

| Sheet 8 | 1 | 2 | 3 | 4 | 5 | 6 | 7 | 8 | Final |
| (United States) Tabitha Peterson | 2 | 0 | 1 | 0 | 2 | 0 | 0 | 0 | 5 |
| (Japan) Satsuki Fujisawa 🔨 | 0 | 2 | 0 | 1 | 0 | 3 | 1 | 1 | 8 |

=== Draw 9 ===
Sunday, October 10, 9:00 am

| Sheet 2 | 1 | 2 | 3 | 4 | 5 | 6 | 7 | 8 | Final |
| (United States) Cory Christensen | 0 | 0 | 2 | 0 | 0 | 0 | 0 | X | 2 |
| (Saskatchewan) Penny Barker 🔨 | 1 | 2 | 0 | 1 | 1 | 1 | 1 | X | 7 |

| Sheet 3 | 1 | 2 | 3 | 4 | 5 | 6 | 7 | 8 | 9 | Final |
| (South Korea) Gim Un-chi 🔨 | 1 | 1 | 0 | 0 | 1 | 1 | 1 | 0 | 1 | 6 |
| (Manitoba) Tracy Fleury | 0 | 0 | 3 | 1 | 0 | 0 | 0 | 1 | 0 | 5 |

| Sheet 4 | 1 | 2 | 3 | 4 | 5 | 6 | 7 | 8 | Final |
| (Saskatchewan) Amber Holland 🔨 | 1 | 0 | 1 | 0 | 2 | 2 | 0 | 1 | 7 |
| (Saskatchewan) Team Silvernagle | 0 | 2 | 0 | 2 | 0 | 0 | 1 | 0 | 5 |

| Sheet 5 | 1 | 2 | 3 | 4 | 5 | 6 | 7 | 8 | Final |
| (British Columbia) Corryn Brown 🔨 | 2 | 0 | 0 | 1 | 1 | 0 | 2 | X | 6 |
| (Alberta) Elysa Crough | 0 | 1 | 0 | 0 | 0 | 1 | 0 | X | 2 |

| Sheet 6 | 1 | 2 | 3 | 4 | 5 | 6 | 7 | 8 | Final |
| (Manitoba) Kerri Einarson 🔨 | 0 | 2 | 0 | 0 | 0 | 2 | 0 | 0 | 4 |
| (Manitoba) Jennifer Jones | 1 | 0 | 0 | 1 | 1 | 0 | 1 | 1 | 5 |

| Sheet 7 | 1 | 2 | 3 | 4 | 5 | 6 | 7 | 8 | Final |
| (Alberta) Ryleigh Bakker | 0 | 1 | 0 | 0 | 0 | 2 | 0 | 1 | 4 |
| (Alberta) Casey Scheidegger 🔨 | 1 | 0 | 3 | 1 | 1 | 0 | 0 | 0 | 6 |

| Sheet 8 | 1 | 2 | 3 | 4 | 5 | 6 | 7 | 8 | Final |
| (Alberta) Marla Sherrer 🔨 | 1 | 0 | 0 | 0 | 0 | X | X | X | 1 |
| (Alberta) Kelsey Rocque | 0 | 2 | 3 | 1 | 3 | X | X | X | 9 |

=== Draw 10 ===
Sunday, October 10, 12:45 pm

| Sheet 2 | 1 | 2 | 3 | 4 | 5 | 6 | 7 | 8 | 9 | Final |
| (United States) Jamie Sinclair | 0 | 2 | 1 | 1 | 0 | 1 | 0 | 0 | 1 | 6 |
| (United States) Tabitha Peterson 🔨 | 0 | 0 | 0 | 0 | 3 | 0 | 0 | 2 | 0 | 5 |

| Sheet 3 | 1 | 2 | 3 | 4 | 5 | 6 | 7 | 8 | Final |
| (Saskatchewan) Chelsea Carey 🔨 | 1 | 2 | 0 | 0 | 2 | 1 | 2 | X | 8 |
| (Scotland) GB Red | 0 | 0 | 1 | 1 | 0 | 0 | 0 | X | 2 |

| Sheet 4 | 1 | 2 | 3 | 4 | 5 | 6 | 7 | 8 | Final |
| (Germany) Daniela Jentsch | 0 | 1 | 0 | 0 | 3 | 0 | 1 | 0 | 5 |
| (Alberta) Selena Sturmay 🔨 | 2 | 0 | 2 | 2 | 0 | 2 | 0 | 1 | 9 |

| Sheet 5 | 1 | 2 | 3 | 4 | 5 | 6 | 7 | 8 | Final |
| (Ontario) Rachel Homan | 1 | 0 | 3 | 0 | 2 | 0 | 1 | 1 | 8 |
| (Saskatchewan) Sherry Anderson 🔨 | 0 | 2 | 0 | 2 | 0 | 1 | 0 | 0 | 5 |

| Sheet 6 | 1 | 2 | 3 | 4 | 5 | 6 | 7 | 8 | Final |
| (Alberta) Kayla Skrlik | 0 | 2 | 0 | 3 | 0 | 1 | 0 | 2 | 8 |
| (Saskatchewan) Emily Haupstein 🔨 | 1 | 0 | 2 | 0 | 2 | 0 | 1 | 0 | 6 |

| Sheet 8 | 1 | 2 | 3 | 4 | 5 | 6 | 7 | 8 | Final |
| (Manitoba) Jennifer Jones 🔨 | 3 | 0 | 2 | 0 | 1 | 0 | 1 | 0 | 7 |
| (South Korea) Gim Un-chi | 0 | 2 | 0 | 2 | 0 | 1 | 0 | 3 | 8 |

=== Draw 11 ===
Sunday, October 10, 4:30 pm

| Sheet 1 | 1 | 2 | 3 | 4 | 5 | 6 | 7 | 8 | 9 | Final |
| (Ontario) Rachel Homan | 0 | 2 | 0 | 1 | 0 | 0 | 2 | 0 | 1 | 6 |
| (Alberta) Kayla Skrlik 🔨 | 1 | 0 | 1 | 0 | 1 | 1 | 0 | 1 | 0 | 5 |

| Sheet 2 | 1 | 2 | 3 | 4 | 5 | 6 | 7 | 8 | Final |
| (Alberta) Selena Sturmay 🔨 | 0 | 0 | 1 | 0 | 1 | 1 | 0 | 1 | 4 |
| (British Columbia) Corryn Brown | 0 | 1 | 0 | 2 | 0 | 0 | 0 | 0 | 3 |

| Sheet 4 | 1 | 2 | 3 | 4 | 5 | 6 | 7 | 8 | Final |
| (Saskatchewan) Penny Barker | 0 | 0 | 0 | 1 | 1 | 0 | 1 | X | 3 |
| (Manitoba) Kerri Einarson 🔨 | 3 | 2 | 0 | 0 | 0 | 1 | 0 | X | 6 |

| Sheet 5 | 1 | 2 | 3 | 4 | 5 | 6 | 7 | 8 | Final |
| (Alberta) Casey Scheidegger 🔨 | 0 | 1 | 0 | 0 | 0 | 0 | X | X | 1 |
| (United States) Tabitha Peterson | 1 | 0 | 2 | 3 | 1 | 1 | X | X | 8 |

| Sheet 6 | 1 | 2 | 3 | 4 | 5 | 6 | 7 | 8 | Final |
| (Saskatchewan) Amber Holland 🔨 | 0 | 0 | 3 | 0 | 4 | 0 | 0 | X | 7 |
| (Manitoba) Tracy Fleury | 0 | 3 | 0 | 1 | 0 | 3 | 3 | X | 10 |

| Sheet 7 | 1 | 2 | 3 | 4 | 5 | 6 | 7 | 8 | Final |
| (Alberta) Kelsey Rocque | 0 | 2 | 0 | 2 | 0 | 1 | 0 | 1 | 6 |
| (Scotland) GB Red 🔨 | 0 | 0 | 2 | 0 | 1 | 0 | 1 | 0 | 4 |

| Sheet 8 | 1 | 2 | 3 | 4 | 5 | 6 | 7 | 8 | Final |
| (Saskatchewan) Chelsea Carey | 0 | 1 | 0 | 3 | 0 | 3 | 0 | 2 | 9 |
| (United States) Jamie Sinclair 🔨 | 2 | 0 | 1 | 0 | 2 | 0 | 2 | 0 | 7 |

=== Draw 12 ===
Sunday, October 10, 8:15 pm

| Sheet 2 | 1 | 2 | 3 | 4 | 5 | 6 | 7 | 8 | Final |
| (United States) Tabitha Peterson | 0 | 1 | 0 | 1 | 1 | 0 | 2 | 2 | 7 |
| (Alberta) Kelsey Rocque 🔨 | 1 | 0 | 2 | 0 | 0 | 2 | 0 | 0 | 5 |

| Sheet 4 | 1 | 2 | 3 | 4 | 5 | 6 | 7 | 8 | Final |
| (Ontario) Rachel Homan | 0 | 2 | 0 | 0 | 0 | 0 | 1 | X | 3 |
| (Manitoba) Jennifer Jones 🔨 | 2 | 0 | 0 | 2 | 0 | 2 | 0 | X | 6 |

| Sheet 6 | 1 | 2 | 3 | 4 | 5 | 6 | 7 | 8 | Final |
| (Alberta) Selena Sturmay 🔨 | 1 | 1 | 0 | 0 | 0 | 0 | 0 | X | 2 |
| (United States) Jamie Sinclair | 0 | 0 | 1 | 1 | 1 | 1 | 2 | X | 6 |

| Sheet 8 | 1 | 2 | 3 | 4 | 5 | 6 | 7 | 8 | Final |
| (Manitoba) Kerri Einarson | 0 | 0 | 0 | 0 | 1 | 0 | 1 | 0 | 2 |
| (Manitoba) Tracy Fleury 🔨 | 0 | 0 | 0 | 1 | 0 | 1 | 0 | 2 | 4 |

== Playoffs ==
Quarterfinals
A1 | (Scotland) GB Blue | 6
C3 | (United States) Tabitha Peterson | 7
C1 | (Manitoba) Jennifer Jones | 5
B2 | (Saskatchewan) Chelsea Carey | 6
B1 | (South Korea) Gim Un-chi | 2
C2 | (United States) Jamie Sinclair | 6
C4 | (Manitoba) Tracy Fleury | 4
A2 | (Japan) Satsuki Fujisawa | 5

Semifinals
C3 | (United States) Tabitha Peterson | 9
B2 | (Saskatchewan) Chelsea Carey | 0
C2 | (United States) Jamie Sinclair | 3
A2 | (Japan) Satsuki Fujisawa | 6

Final
C3 | (United States) Tabitha Peterson | 7
A2 | (Japan) Satsuki Fujisawa | 5

=== Quarterfinals ===
Monday, October 11, 9:00 am

| Sheet 3 | 1 | 2 | 3 | 4 | 5 | 6 | 7 | 8 | Final |
| (Scotland) GB Blue 🔨 | 2 | 0 | 1 | 0 | 2 | 0 | 1 | 0 | 6 |
| (United States) Tabitha Peterson | 0 | 2 | 0 | 2 | 0 | 2 | 0 | 1 | 7 |

| Sheet 4 | 1 | 2 | 3 | 4 | 5 | 6 | 7 | 8 | Final |
| (South Korea) Gim Un-chi 🔨 | 0 | 0 | 1 | 0 | 0 | 0 | 1 | X | 2 |
| (United States) Jamie Sinclair | 1 | 1 | 0 | 1 | 2 | 1 | 0 | X | 6 |

| Sheet 6 | 1 | 2 | 3 | 4 | 5 | 6 | 7 | 8 | 9 | Final |
| (Manitoba) Jennifer Jones | 1 | 0 | 1 | 0 | 0 | 1 | 0 | 2 | 0 | 5 |
| (Saskatchewan) Chelsea Carey 🔨 | 0 | 1 | 0 | 1 | 1 | 0 | 2 | 0 | 1 | 6 |

| Sheet 7 | 1 | 2 | 3 | 4 | 5 | 6 | 7 | 8 | Final |
| (Manitoba) Tracy Fleury | 0 | 2 | 0 | 0 | 0 | 1 | 0 | 1 | 4 |
| (Japan) Satsuki Fujisawa 🔨 | 2 | 0 | 0 | 1 | 0 | 0 | 2 | 0 | 5 |

=== Semifinals ===
Monday, October 11, 12:15 pm

| Sheet 2 | 1 | 2 | 3 | 4 | 5 | 6 | 7 | 8 | Final |
| (United States) Jamie Sinclair | 0 | 0 | 1 | 0 | 1 | 0 | 1 | X | 3 |
| (Japan) Satsuki Fujisawa 🔨 | 1 | 1 | 0 | 1 | 0 | 3 | 0 | X | 6 |

| Sheet 7 | 1 | 2 | 3 | 4 | 5 | 6 | 7 | 8 | Final |
| (United States) Tabitha Peterson | 2 | 4 | 3 | X | X | X | X | X | 9 |
| (Saskatchewan) Chelsea Carey 🔨 | 0 | 0 | 0 | X | X | X | X | X | 0 |

=== Final ===
Monday, October 11, 3:30 pm

| Sheet 5 | 1 | 2 | 3 | 4 | 5 | 6 | 7 | 8 | Final |
| (United States) Tabitha Peterson | 2 | 0 | 0 | 2 | 0 | 2 | 0 | 1 | 7 |
| (Japan) Satsuki Fujisawa 🔨 | 0 | 1 | 0 | 0 | 2 | 0 | 2 | 0 | 5 |
