= Martensville International =

Canadian curling tournament

- Established: 2022
- Host city: Martensville, Saskatchewan
- Arena: Martensville Curling Club
- Purse: $12,500
- 2026 champion: (Manitoba) Jordon McDonald

The Curling Stadium Martensville International is an annual curling tournament held at the Martensville Curling Club in Martensville, Saskatchewan.

The event was first held in September 2022 with a men's and women's tournament held at the same time. There was no event held for the 2023–24 season (Martensville played host to a Mixed Doubles bonspiel instead). The event returned for the 2024–25 season with a women's event held in October, and a men's event held in March.

The event is organized by Curling Stadium Saskatchewan, and all games are streamed on YouTube.

== Winners ==
=== Men's ===
Year	Champion team	Runner-up team	Purse
2022	(Switzerland) Benoît Schwarz, Yannick Schwaller (skip), Sven Michel, Pablo Lachat	(Japan) Riku Yanagisawa, Tsuyoshi Yamaguchi, Takeru Yamamoto, Satoshi Koizumi	$22,250
2025	(United States) Korey Dropkin, Andrew Stopera, Mark Fenner, Thomas Howell	(Ontario) Scott Howard, Mat Camm, Jason Camm, Tim March	$21,000
2026	(Manitoba) Jordon McDonald, Jacques Gauthier, Elias Huminicki, Cameron Olafson	(Saskatchewan) Mike McEwen, Colton Flasch, Kevin Marsh, Dan Marsh	$12,500

=== Women's ===
Year	Champion team	Runner-up team	Purse
2022	(British Columbia) Clancy Grandy, Kayla MacMillan, Lindsay Dubue, Sarah Loken	(Switzerland) Alina Pätz, Silvana Tirinzoni (skip), Carole Howald, Briar Hürlimann	$25,000
2024	(Alberta) Kayla Skrlik, Margot Flemming, Ashton Skrlik, Geri-Lynn Ramsay	(Saskatchewan) Amber Holland, Jill Shumay, Sherri Singler, Trenna Derdall	$14,500
