= 2013 Good Times Bonspiel =

- Host city: Calgary, Alberta
- Arena: Calgary Curling Club
- Dates: September 6–8
- Men's winner: (Alberta) Terry Meek
- Curling club: Calgary CC, Calgary
- Skip: Terry Meek
- Third: Adrian Bakker
- Second: Eugene Doherty
- Lead: Keith Mason
- Finalist: (Alberta) Bert Martin
- Women's winner: (Alberta) Cheryl Bernard
- Curling club: Calgary CC, Calgary
- Skip: Cheryl Bernard
- Third: Susan O'Connor
- Second: Lori Olson-Johns
- Lead: Shannon Aleksic
- Finalist: (Alberta) Jocelyn Peterman

The 2013 Good Times Bonspiel was held from September 6 to 8 at the Calgary Curling Club in Calgary, Alberta as part of the 2013–14 World Curling Tour. It was the first ever edition of the event. Both the men's and women's events were held in a double knockout format. The purse for both the men's and the women's events was CAD$8,000 each.

The Terry Meek rink from Calgary won the men's event, defeating Bert Martin's rink from Airdrie. Lloyd Hill, also from Calgary, won the consolation event.

On the women's side, 2010 Olympic silver medalist Cheryl Bernard and her rink from Calgary defeated Jocelyn Peterman's team from Red Deer. Crystal Webster's rink, also from Calgary won the consolation event.

== Teams entered ==
=== Men ===
The teams were as follows:

Skip	Third	Second	Lead	Locale
Cam Culp	Chris Hanson	Richard Grant	Steven Metzger	Airdrie, Alberta
Chad Dahlseide	Jamie Chisholm	James Wenzel	Rob Lane	Calgary, Alberta
Jeremy Harty	Cole Parsons	Joel Berger	Gregg Hamilton	Calgary, Alberta
Wayne Heikkinen	Chris Anderson	Wendal Hulberg	Gordon Hart	Calgary, Alberta
Lloyd Hill	Scott Egger	Greg Hill	Maurice Sonier	Calgary, Alberta
Josh Lambden	Morio Kumagawa	Chris McDonah	Andrew Stevenson	Airdrie, Alberta
Mike Libbus	Kevin Muir	Brad MacInnis	Peter Keenan	Black Diamond, Alberta
Dean Mamer	Vance Elder	Jason Stannard	Wallace Hollingshead	Calgary, Alberta
Bert Martin	Rhett Friesz	Jon Rennie	Brad Kokoroyannis	Airdrie, Alberta
Terry Meek	Adrian Bakker	Eugene Doherty	Keith Mason	Calgary, Alberta
Sean O'Connor	Rob Johnson	Ryan O'Connor	Dan Bubola	Calgary, Alberta
Steve Slupski				Moose Jaw, Saskatchewan
Scott Smith	James Keats	Colton Goller	Nicholas Rabl	Calgary, Alberta

=== Women ===
The teams were as follows:

Skip	Third	Second	Lead	Locale
Lindsey Allen	Sara Gartner	Krista Crowther	Sarah Horne	Calgary, Alberta
Cheryl Bernard	Susan O'Connor	Lori Olson-Johns	Shannon Aleksic	Calgary, Alberta
Tanilla Doyle	Lindsay Amundsen-Meyer	Dayna Connolly	Christina Faulkner	Calgary, Alberta
Diane Foster	Judy Pendergast	Terri Loblaw	Sue Fulkerth	Calgary, Alberta
Teryn Hamilton	Hayley Furst	Jody Keim	Heather Hansen	Calgary, Alberta
Heather Jensen	Darah Provencal	Shana Snell	Morgan Muise	Calgary, Alberta
Shannon Kleibrink	Bronwen Webster	Kalynn Park	Chelsey Matson	Calgary, Alberta
Amy Nixon	Nadine Chyz	Whitney Eckstrand	Heather Rogers	Calgary, Alberta
Jocelyn Peterman	Brittany Tran	Rebecca Konschuh	Kristine Anderson	Red Deer, Alberta
Casey Scheidegger	Denise Kinghorn	Jessie Scheidegger	Kimberly Anderson	Lethbridge, Alberta
Crystal Webster	Cathy Overton-Clapham	Geri-Lynn Ramsay	Samantha Preston	Calgary, Alberta
