= 2022 Curlers Corner Autumn Gold Curling Classic =

- Host city: Calgary, Alberta
- Arena: Calgary Curling Club
- Dates: October 28–31
- Winner: (South Korea) Team Gim
- Curling club: Uijeongbu CC, Uijeongbu
- Skip: Gim Eun-ji
- Third: Kim Min-ji
- Second: Kim Su-ji
- Lead: Seol Ye-eun
- Alternate: Seol Ye-ji
- Coach: Shin Dong-ho
- Finalist: (Switzerland) Michèle Jäggi

The 2022 Curlers Corner Autumn Gold Curling Classic was held from October 28 to 31 at the Calgary Curling Club in Calgary, Alberta. The event was held in a triple-knockout format with a purse of $44,000.

In the final, South Korea's Gim Eun-ji rink won their second event title of the season, defeating Switzerland's Michèle Jäggi 8–2 in an all-international final. After taking two in the first end, the Korean rink opened up a four-point lead with a steal of two in the second end. The teams then traded singles through the next three ends with Team Gim continuing a three-point lead. In the sixth, Gim secured the victory for her team of Kim Min-ji, Kim Su-ji, Seol Ye-eun and Seol Ye-ji with a hit to score three points, ending the game early. To reach the final, the Korean team qualified for the playoffs through the B event with a 5–1 record. They then defeated Manitoba's Abby Ackland 7–4 in the quarterfinals and Alberta's Casey Scheidegger 5–4 in the semifinals. The Swiss Jäggi rink took a different path to the playoff round, dropping into the last chance C event early before rattling off three straight victories to qualify with a 5–2 record. They then upset the two top ranked teams in Manitoba's Kaitlyn Lawes and Jennifer Jones 6–5 in the quarterfinal and semifinal rounds respectively. Kayla Skrlik and Selena Sturmay also qualified for the playoffs but lost in the quarterfinals.

== Teams ==
The teams are listed as follows:

Skip	Third	Second	Lead	Alternate	Locale
Abby Ackland	Meghan Walter	Sara Oliver	Mackenzie Elias	Kaitlyn Jones	Winnipeg, Manitoba
Madison Bear	Annmarie Dubberstein	Elizabeth Cousins	Allison Howell		(United States) Chaska, Minnesota
Claire Booth	Kaylee Raniseth	Raelyn Helston	Lauren Miller		Calgary, Alberta
Chelsea Carey	Jolene Campbell	Liz Fyfe	Rachel Erickson	Jamie Sinclair	Winnipeg, Manitoba
Elysa Crough	Quinn Prodaniuk	Kim Bonneau	Julianna Mackenzie		Edmonton, Alberta
Gim Eun-ji	Kim Min-ji	Kim Su-ji	Seol Ye-eun	Seol Ye-ji	Uijeongbu, South Korea
Clancy Grandy	Kayla MacMillan	Lindsay Dubue	Sarah Loken		Vancouver, British Columbia
Serena Gray-Withers	Catherine Clifford	Brianna Cullen	Zoe Cinnamon		Edmonton, Alberta
Amber Holland	Kim Schneider	Karlee Korchinski	Debbie Lozinski		Kronau, Saskatchewan
Ashley Howard	Cary-Anne McTaggart	Sara England	Shelby Brandt		Regina, Saskatchewan
Jessie Hunkin	Kristen Streifel	Becca Hebert	Dayna Demers		Spruce Grove, Alberta
Michèle Jäggi	Irene Schori	Stefanie Berset	Sarah Müller	Lara Stocker	Bern, Switzerland
Daniela Jentsch	Emira Abbes	Pia-Lisa Schöll (Note: Pia-Lisa Schöll spared for Mia Höhne.)	Analena Jentsch		Füssen, Germany
Jennifer Jones	Mackenzie Zacharias	Karlee Burgess	Emily Zacharias	Lauren Lenentine	Winnipeg, Manitoba
Ikue Kitazawa	Seina Nakajima	Minori Suzuki	Hasumi Ishigooka	Chiaki Matsumura	Nagano, Japan
Kaitlyn Lawes	Selena Njegovan	Jocelyn Peterman	Kristin MacCuish		Winnipeg, Manitoba
Kaylee McNamee	Kelsie Cygan	Rebecca Fradette	Sarah Guina		Calgary, Alberta
Kristie Moore	Susan O'Connor	Janais DeJong	Valerie Ekelund		Sexsmith, Alberta
Rebecca Morrison (Fourth)	Sophie Sinclair	Sophie Jackson (Skip)	– (Note: Team Morrison played with three players.)		Stirling, Scotland
Lisa Parent	Sophie Brissette	Kaitlin Zeller	Megan Johnson		Calgary, Alberta
Beth Peterson	Jenna Loder	Katherine Doerksen	Melissa Gordon		Winnipeg, Manitoba
Kelsey Rocque	Danielle Schmiemann	Dana Ferguson	Rachelle Brown		Edmonton, Alberta
Casey Scheidegger	Kate Hogan	Jessie Haughian	Taylor McDonald		Lethbridge, Alberta
Lorraine Schneider	Larisa Murray	Ashley Williamson	Amanda Kuzyk		Regina, Saskatchewan
Marla Sherrer	Chantele Broderson	Julie Selvais	Sarah Drummond		Lacombe, Alberta
Kayla Skrlik	Geri-Lynn Ramsay	Brittany Tran	Ashton Skrlik		Calgary, Alberta
Selena Sturmay	Abby Marks	Kate Goodhelpsen	Paige Papley		Edmonton, Alberta
Joanne Tarvit					St. Thomas, Ontario
Rhonda Varnes	Janelle Lach	Hallie McCannell	Jolene Callum	Sarah-Jane Sass	Portage la Prairie, Manitoba
Kristy Watling	Hailey McFarlane	Emilie Rafsnon	Sarah Pyke	Laura Burtnyk	Winnipeg, Manitoba
Jessica Wytrychowski	Jessica Koch	Emily Neufeld	Cheryl Damen		Calgary, Alberta

== Knockout brackets ==
=== A event ===
First Knockout	Qualifier 1
(Manitoba) Kaitlyn Lawes	8
(Alberta) Jessie Hunkin	7	(Alberta) Jessie Hunkin	5
(Saskatchewan) Amber Holland	6	(Manitoba) Kaitlyn Lawes	8
(Japan) Ikue Kitazawa	6	(Japan) Ikue Kitazawa	5
(United States) Madison Bear	5	(Japan) Ikue Kitazawa	8
(Alberta) Selena Sturmay	7	(Alberta) Selena Sturmay	2
(Alberta) Marla Sherrer	6	(Manitoba) Kaitlyn Lawes	4
(Alberta) Casey Scheidegger	5	(Alberta) Casey Scheidegger	6
(Alberta) Claire Booth	2	(Alberta) Casey Scheidegger	5
(Manitoba) Kristy Watling	7	(Manitoba) Kristy Watling	2
(Scotland) Team Morrison	3	(Alberta) Casey Scheidegger	6
(Manitoba) Chelsea Carey	9	(Manitoba) Chelsea Carey	5
(Alberta) Kaylee McNamee	4	(Manitoba) Chelsea Carey	5
(Alberta) Kelsey Rocque	8	(Alberta) Kelsey Rocque	3
(Saskatchewan) Lorraine Schneider	2

First Knockout	Qualifier 2
(Manitoba) Jennifer Jones	12
(Ontario) Joanne Tarvit	2	(Manitoba) Jennifer Jones	6
(Alberta) Serena Gray-Withers	0	(Alberta) Kayla Skrlik	7
(Alberta) Kayla Skrlik	6	(Alberta) Kayla Skrlik	10
(British Columbia) Clancy Grandy	9	(Switzerland) Michèle Jäggi	3
(Manitoba) Rhonda Varnes	2	(British Columbia) Clancy Grandy	6
(Switzerland) Michèle Jäggi	7	(Switzerland) Michèle Jäggi	7
(Alberta) Kristie Moore	5	(Alberta) Kayla Skrlik	7
(South Korea) Gim Eun-ji	7	(South Korea) Gim Eun-ji	3
(Alberta) Lisa Parent	2	(South Korea) Gim Eun-ji	6
(Manitoba) Beth Peterson	5	(Manitoba) Beth Peterson	5
(Saskatchewan) Ashley Howard	3	(South Korea) Gim Eun-ji	6
(Germany) Daniela Jentsch	8	(Germany) Daniela Jentsch	4
(Alberta) Jessica Wytrychowski	2	(Germany) Daniela Jentsch	7
(Manitoba) Abby Ackland	9	(Manitoba) Abby Ackland	1
(Alberta) Elysa Crough	3

=== B event ===
Second Knockout	To Qualifier 3
(Manitoba) Abby Ackland	9
(Saskatchewan) Amber Holland	3
(Manitoba) Abby Ackland	7
(Switzerland) Michèle Jäggi	5
(Manitoba) Abby Ackland	7
(Manitoba) Chelsea Carey	3
(Manitoba) Beth Peterson	2
(United States) Madison Bear	6	(United States) Madison Bear	7
(Alberta) Marla Sherrer	4	(United States) Madison Bear	6	Qualifier 3
(Manitoba) Chelsea Carey	7
(Manitoba) Abby Ackland	7
(Manitoba) Kaitlyn Lawes	8

Second Knockout	To Qualifier 3
(British Columbia) Clancy Grandy	6
(Alberta) Claire Booth	1	(Scotland) Team Morrison	5
(Scotland) Team Morrison	10	(British Columbia) Clancy Grandy	8
(Manitoba) Jennifer Jones	1
(Manitoba) Jennifer Jones	7
(Alberta) Kaylee McNamee	3	(Saskatchewan) Lorraine Schneider	3
(Saskatchewan) Lorraine Schneider	8	(British Columbia) Clancy Grandy	6
(Manitoba) Kaitlyn Lawes	8

Second Knockout	To Qualifier 4
(Alberta) Kelsey Rocque	6
(Ontario) Joanne Tarvit	3	(Alberta) Serena Gray-Withers	9
(Alberta) Serena Gray-Withers	6	(Alberta) Serena Gray-Withers	2
(Germany) Daniela Jentsch	6
(Germany) Daniela Jentsch	5
(Japan) Ikue Kitazawa	4
(Manitoba) Kristy Watling	8
(Manitoba) Rhonda Varnes	7	(Manitoba) Rhonda Varnes	3
(Alberta) Kristie Moore	4	(Manitoba) Kristy Watling	4	Qualifier 4
(Japan) Ikue Kitazawa	9
(Germany) Daniela Jentsch	5
(South Korea) Gim Eun-ji	8

Second Knockout	To Qualifier 4
(Alberta) Selena Sturmay	11
(Alberta) Lisa Parent	6	(Alberta) Lisa Parent	2
(Saskatchewan) Ashley Howard	5	(Alberta) Selena Sturmay	8
(Alberta) Jessie Hunkin	2
(Alberta) Jessie Hunkin	8
(Alberta) Jessica Wytrychowski	7	(Alberta) Jessica Wytrychowski	2
(Alberta) Elysa Crough	5	(Alberta) Selena Sturmay	6
(South Korea) Gim Eun-ji	7

=== C event ===
Third Knockout	Qualifier 5
(Alberta) Serena Gray-Withers	11
(Alberta) Marla Sherrer	2
(Alberta) Serena Gray-Withers	6
(Alberta) Claire Booth	4
(Manitoba) Kristy Watling	2
(Alberta) Claire Booth	7	(Alberta) Claire Booth	7
(Alberta) Kaylee McNamee	3	(Alberta) Serena Gray-Withers	3
(Manitoba) Abby Ackland	5

Third Knockout	Qualifier 6
(Saskatchewan) Amber Holland	3
(Manitoba) Beth Peterson	6
(Manitoba) Beth Peterson	3
(Alberta) Selena Sturmay	6
(Alberta) Selena Sturmay	7
(Alberta) Jessie Hunkin	6
(Alberta) Jessie Hunkin	9
(Scotland) Team Morrison	3	(Saskatchewan) Lorraine Schneider	5
(Saskatchewan) Lorraine Schneider	5	(Alberta) Jessie Hunkin	7
(Japan) Ikue Kitazawa	5

Third Knockout	Qualifier 7
(Manitoba) Jennifer Jones	6
(Alberta) Lisa Parent	3	(Alberta) Jessica Wytrychowski	3
(Alberta) Jessica Wytrychowski	7	(Manitoba) Jennifer Jones	9
(Manitoba) Chelsea Carey	3
(Manitoba) Jennifer Jones	11
(British Columbia) Clancy Grandy	3
(Alberta) Kelsey Rocque	6
(Manitoba) Rhonda Varnes	1
(Alberta) Kelsey Rocque	4
(British Columbia) Clancy Grandy	8

Third Knockout	Qualifier 8
(Switzerland) Michèle Jäggi	8
(Ontario) Joanne Tarvit	3	(Alberta) Kristie Moore	4
(Alberta) Kristie Moore	8	(Switzerland) Michèle Jäggi	8
(Alberta) Elysa Crough	1
(United States) Madison Bear	3
(Saskatchewan) Ashley Howard	3	(Alberta) Elysa Crough	7
(Alberta) Elysa Crough	9	(Switzerland) Michèle Jäggi	9
(Germany) Daniela Jentsch	1

== Knockout results ==
All draw times listed in Mountain Daylight Time (UTC-06:00).

=== Draw 1 ===
Friday, October 28, 9:30 am

Sheet 1	1	2	3	4	5	6	7	8	Final
(Manitoba) Kristy Watling	0	4	0	0	0	2	1	X	7
(Scotland) Team Morrison 🔨	1	0	0	1	1	0	0	X	3

Sheet 2	1	2	3	4	5	6	7	8	Final
(Alberta) Selena Sturmay	0	0	0	0	2	1	2	2	7
(Alberta) Marla Sherrer 🔨	2	1	2	1	0	0	0	0	6

Sheet 3	1	2	3	4	5	6	7	8	9	Final
(Alberta) Jessie Hunkin	0	2	0	0	1	1	0	2	1	7
(Saskatchewan) Amber Holland 🔨	1	0	1	0	0	0	4	0	0	6

Sheet 4	1	2	3	4	5	6	7	8	Final
(Manitoba) Chelsea Carey 🔨	3	0	3	0	2	1	0	X	9
(Alberta) Kaylee McNamee	0	2	0	1	0	0	1	X	4

Sheet 5	1	2	3	4	5	6	7	8	Final
(Alberta) Casey Scheidegger 🔨	0	3	1	0	0	1	0	X	5
(Alberta) Claire Booth	0	0	0	1	0	0	1	X	2

Sheet 6	1	2	3	4	5	6	7	8	Final
(Alberta) Kelsey Rocque 🔨	1	1	0	0	5	1	X	X	8
(Saskatchewan) Lorraine Schneider	0	0	1	1	0	0	X	X	2

Sheet 7	1	2	3	4	5	6	7	8	Final
(Japan) Ikue Kitazawa 🔨	1	2	2	0	0	0	1	0	6
(United States) Madison Bear	0	0	0	2	1	1	0	1	5

=== Draw 2 ===
Friday, October 28, 1:15 pm

Sheet 1	1	2	3	4	5	6	7	8	Final
(British Columbia) Clancy Grandy 🔨	1	2	0	4	2	X	X	X	9
(Manitoba) Rhonda Varnes	0	0	2	0	0	X	X	X	2

Sheet 2	1	2	3	4	5	6	7	8	Final
(Alberta) Serena Gray-Withers	0	0	0	0	0	0	X	X	0
(Alberta) Kayla Skrlik 🔨	1	0	1	3	0	1	X	X	6

Sheet 3	1	2	3	4	5	6	7	8	Final
(Germany) Daniela Jentsch 🔨	1	0	0	1	1	2	3	X	8
(Alberta) Jessica Wytrychowski	0	1	1	0	0	0	0	X	2

Sheet 4	1	2	3	4	5	6	7	8	Final
(Switzerland) Michèle Jäggi 🔨	0	2	0	3	0	1	0	1	7
(Alberta) Kristie Moore	0	0	2	0	2	0	1	0	5

Sheet 5	1	2	3	4	5	6	7	8	Final
(Manitoba) Jennifer Jones 🔨	3	4	1	0	0	4	X	X	12
(Ontario) Joanne Tarvit	0	0	0	1	1	0	X	X	2

Sheet 6	1	2	3	4	5	6	7	8	Final
(South Korea) Gim Eun-ji	1	1	1	0	3	0	1	X	7
(Alberta) Lisa Parent 🔨	0	0	0	1	0	1	0	X	2

Sheet 7	1	2	3	4	5	6	7	8	Final
(Manitoba) Beth Peterson 🔨	0	1	0	1	1	1	0	1	5
(Saskatchewan) Ashley Howard	0	0	1	0	0	0	2	0	3

Sheet 8	1	2	3	4	5	6	7	8	Final
(Manitoba) Abby Ackland	1	0	4	1	0	0	3	X	9
(Alberta) Elysa Crough 🔨	0	1	0	0	1	1	0	X	3

=== Draw 3 ===
Friday, October 28, 5:15 pm

Sheet 1	1	2	3	4	5	6	7	8	Final
(United States) Madison Bear 🔨	1	1	1	1	0	0	0	2	6
(Alberta) Marla Sherrer	0	0	0	0	2	0	2	0	4

Sheet 2	1	2	3	4	5	6	7	8	Final
(Alberta) Claire Booth	0	1	0	0	0	X	X	X	1
(Scotland) Team Morrison 🔨	3	0	1	2	4	X	X	X	10

Sheet 3	1	2	3	4	5	6	7	8	Final
(Alberta) Casey Scheidegger 🔨	0	1	0	2	1	0	1	X	5
(Manitoba) Kristy Watling	1	0	1	0	0	0	0	X	2

Sheet 4	1	2	3	4	5	6	7	8	Final
(Japan) Ikue Kitazawa 🔨	1	0	2	1	0	4	X	X	8
(Alberta) Selena Sturmay	0	1	0	0	1	0	X	X	2

Sheet 5	1	2	3	4	5	6	7	8	Final
(Alberta) Chelsea Carey	0	0	2	0	0	3	0	X	5
(Alberta) Kelsey Rocque 🔨	1	0	0	0	1	0	1	X	3

Sheet 6	1	2	3	4	5	6	7	8	Final
(Manitoba) Kaitlyn Lawes	0	3	0	3	1	1	0	X	8
(Alberta) Jessie Hunkin 🔨	3	0	1	0	0	0	1	X	5

Sheet 7	1	2	3	4	5	6	7	8	Final
(Alberta) Kaylee McNamee 🔨	0	0	0	1	0	2	0	X	3
(Saskatchewan) Lorraine Schneider	2	2	1	0	1	0	2	X	8

=== Draw 4 ===
Friday, October 28, 9:00 pm

Sheet 1	1	2	3	4	5	6	7	8	Final
(Alberta) Lisa Parent 🔨	0	1	2	0	0	2	0	1	6
(Saskatchewan) Ashley Howard	1	0	0	1	1	0	2	0	5

Sheet 2	1	2	3	4	5	6	7	8	Final
(Alberta) Jessica Wytrychowski 🔨	3	1	0	0	1	0	2	X	7
(Alberta) Elysa Crough	0	0	3	1	0	1	0	X	5

Sheet 3	1	2	3	4	5	6	7	8	Final
(British Columbia) Clancy Grandy	0	3	0	2	0	0	1	0	6
(Switzerland) Michèle Jäggi 🔨	2	0	3	0	0	1	0	1	7

Sheet 4	1	2	3	4	5	6	7	8	Final
(Germany) Daniela Jentsch 🔨	3	1	1	0	0	2	X	X	7
(Manitoba) Abby Ackland	0	0	0	1	0	0	X	X	1

Sheet 5	1	2	3	4	5	6	7	8	Final
(South Korea) Gim Eun-ji 🔨	2	0	0	1	0	2	0	1	6
(Manitoba) Beth Peterson	0	1	0	0	2	0	2	0	5

Sheet 6	1	2	3	4	5	6	7	8	Final
(Manitoba) Rhonda Varnes	2	0	2	1	0	0	1	1	7
(Alberta) Kristie Moore 🔨	0	2	0	0	1	1	0	0	4

Sheet 7	1	2	3	4	5	6	7	8	Final
(Manitoba) Jennifer Jones 🔨	2	0	1	1	0	1	1	0	6
(Alberta) Kayla Skrlik	0	3	0	0	1	0	0	3	7

Sheet 8	1	2	3	4	5	6	7	8	Final
(Ontario) Joanne Tarvit	1	0	0	0	0	2	X	X	3
(Alberta) Serena Gray-Withers 🔨	0	1	1	0	4	0	X	X	6

=== Draw 5 ===
Saturday, October 29, 9:00 am

Sheet 2	1	2	3	4	5	6	7	8	Final
(Manitoba) Abby Ackland	1	0	0	2	4	0	2	X	9
(Saskatchewan) Amber Holland 🔨	0	1	0	0	0	2	0	X	3

Sheet 3	1	2	3	4	5	6	7	8	Final
(Manitoba) Kaitlyn Lawes	3	0	2	0	0	0	0	3	8
(Japan) Ikue Kitazawa 🔨	0	1	0	1	1	1	1	0	5

Sheet 4	1	2	3	4	5	6	7	8	Final
(Manitoba) Beth Peterson 🔨	0	1	0	0	1	0	X	X	2
(United States) Madison Bear	0	0	2	2	0	3	X	X	7

Sheet 5	1	2	3	4	5	6	7	8	Final
(Manitoba) Jennifer Jones	0	0	0	1	3	1	2	X	7
(Saskatchewan) Lorraine Schneider 🔨	1	1	1	0	0	0	0	X	3

Sheet 6	1	2	3	4	5	6	7	8	Final
(Alberta) Casey Scheidegger 🔨	1	0	0	2	1	2	0	0	6
(Manitoba) Chelsea Carey	0	0	2	0	0	0	2	1	5

Sheet 7	1	2	3	4	5	6	7	8	Final
(British Columbia) Clancy Grandy 🔨	2	0	2	0	1	1	0	0	6
(Scotland) Team Morrison	0	2	0	1	0	0	1	1	5

=== Draw 6 ===
Saturday, October 29, 12:45 pm

Sheet 2	1	2	3	4	5	6	7	8	Final
(Manitoba) Kristy Watling	2	0	0	2	2	0	2	X	8
(Manitoba) Rhonda Varnes 🔨	0	1	1	0	0	1	0	X	3

Sheet 3	1	2	3	4	5	6	7	8	Final
(Alberta) Kelsey Rocque 🔨	2	0	1	0	2	1	0	0	6
(Alberta) Serena Gray-Withers	0	2	0	1	0	0	5	1	9

Sheet 4	1	2	3	4	5	6	7	8	Final
(Alberta) Jessie Hunkin 🔨	1	0	1	1	1	1	3	X	8
(Alberta) Jessica Wytrychowski	0	2	0	0	0	0	0	X	2

Sheet 5	1	2	3	4	5	6	7	8	Final
(Alberta) Kayla Skrlik	2	2	0	1	0	2	3	X	10
(Switzerland) Michèle Jäggi 🔨	0	0	1	0	2	0	0	X	3

Sheet 7	1	2	3	4	5	6	7	8	Final
(Alberta) Selena Sturmay 🔨	3	1	0	3	1	3	X	X	11
(Alberta) Lisa Parent	0	0	2	0	0	0	X	X	2

Sheet 8	1	2	3	4	5	6	7	8	Final
(South Korea) Gim Eun-ji 🔨	2	1	0	0	1	0	1	1	6
(Germany) Daniela Jentsch	0	0	2	0	0	2	0	0	4

=== Draw 7 ===
Saturday, October 29, 4:30 pm

Sheet 1	1	2	3	4	5	6	7	8	Final
(Saskatchewan) Ashley Howard 🔨	1	0	2	0	0	0	X	X	3
(Alberta) Elysa Crough	0	3	0	0	5	1	X	X	9

Sheet 2	1	2	3	4	5	6	7	8	Final
(Alberta) Lisa Parent 🔨	0	0	0	2	1	0	0	X	3
(Alberta) Jessica Wytrychowski	1	1	1	0	0	3	1	X	7

Sheet 3	1	2	3	4	5	6	7	8	Final
(United States) Madison Bear 🔨	1	0	2	0	0	0	2	1	6
(Manitoba) Chelsea Carey	0	2	0	2	1	2	0	0	7

Sheet 4	1	2	3	4	5	6	7	8	Final
(Scotland) Team Morrison	0	1	1	0	0	1	0	X	3
(Saskatchewan) Lorraine Schneider 🔨	1	0	0	2	1	0	1	X	5

Sheet 5	1	2	3	4	5	6	7	8	Final
(Manitoba) Kaitlyn Lawes	1	0	1	0	1	0	1	X	4
(Alberta) Casey Scheidegger 🔨	0	4	0	1	0	1	0	X	6

Sheet 6	1	2	3	4	5	6	7	8	Final
(British Columbia) Clancy Grandy 🔨	2	0	0	2	2	2	X	X	8
(Manitoba) Jennifer Jones	0	1	0	0	0	0	X	X	1

Sheet 7	1	2	3	4	5	6	7	8	Final
(Manitoba) Abby Ackland 🔨	2	1	0	2	2	0	0	X	7
(Switzerland) Michèle Jäggi	0	0	1	0	0	2	2	X	5

=== Draw 8 ===
Saturday, October 29, 8:15 pm

Sheet 2	1	2	3	4	5	6	7	8	Final
(Ontario) Joanne Tarvit	0	1	0	1	0	1	X	X	3
(Alberta) Kristie Moore 🔨	1	0	4	0	3	0	X	X	8

Sheet 3	1	2	3	4	5	6	7	8	Final
(Alberta) Claire Booth	0	1	0	2	0	2	2	X	7
(Alberta) Kaylee McNamee 🔨	1	0	1	0	1	0	0	X	3

Sheet 4	1	2	3	4	5	6	7	8	Final
(Alberta) Kayla Skrlik 🔨	0	1	0	5	0	0	1	X	7
(South Korea) Gim Eun-ji	0	0	0	0	1	2	0	X	3

Sheet 5	1	2	3	4	5	6	7	8	Final
(Alberta) Serena Gray-Withers 🔨	0	1	0	0	0	1	0	X	2
(Germany) Daniela Jentsch	1	0	1	2	1	0	1	X	6

Sheet 6	1	2	3	4	5	6	7	8	Final
(Manitoba) Kristy Watling 🔨	0	1	0	3	0	0	0	X	4
(Japan) Ikue Kitazawa	0	0	3	0	3	2	1	X	9

Sheet 8	1	2	3	4	5	6	7	8	Final
(Alberta) Selena Sturmay 🔨	2	0	1	2	1	2	X	X	8
(Alberta) Jessie Hunkin	0	2	0	0	0	0	X	X	2

=== Draw 9 ===
Sunday, October 30, 9:00 am

Sheet 2	1	2	3	4	5	6	7	8	Final
(Manitoba) Abby Ackland 🔨	0	3	0	0	2	2	X	X	7
(Manitoba) Chelsea Carey	0	0	2	1	0	0	X	X	3

Sheet 3	1	2	3	4	5	6	7	8	Final
(Alberta) Jessie Hunkin	0	0	2	0	3	0	1	3	9
(Saskatchewan) Lorraine Schneider 🔨	0	2	0	1	0	2	0	0	5

Sheet 4	1	2	3	4	5	6	7	8	Final
(British Columbia) Clancy Grandy 🔨	0	2	0	0	4	0	0	0	6
(Manitoba) Kaitlyn Lawes	1	0	2	1	0	0	2	2	8

Sheet 5	1	2	3	4	5	6	7	8	Final
(Manitoba) Jennifer Jones 🔨	2	1	0	0	1	0	2	X	6
(Alberta) Jessica Wytrychowski	0	0	1	1	0	1	0	X	3

Sheet 6	1	2	3	4	5	6	7	8	Final
(Saskatchewan) Amber Holland	0	0	0	2	0	1	0	X	3
(Manitoba) Beth Peterson 🔨	1	2	1	0	1	0	1	X	6

Sheet 7	1	2	3	4	5	6	7	8	Final
(United States) Madison Bear	0	2	0	0	1	0	0	0	3
(Alberta) Elysa Crough 🔨	2	0	1	2	0	0	1	1	7

Sheet 8	1	2	3	4	5	6	7	8	Final
(Alberta) Kelsey Rocque 🔨	2	1	2	0	1	X	X	X	6
(Manitoba) Rhonda Varnes	0	0	0	1	0	X	X	X	1

=== Draw 10 ===
Sunday, October 30, 12:45 pm

Sheet 2	1	2	3	4	5	6	7	8	Final
(Germany) Daniela Jentsch	0	1	1	2	0	1	0	0	5
(Japan) Ikue Kitazawa 🔨	1	0	0	0	1	0	1	1	4

Sheet 3	1	2	3	4	5	6	7	8	Final
(Switzerland) Michèle Jäggi 🔨	3	0	1	1	0	0	3	X	8
(Alberta) Kristie Moore	0	2	0	0	1	1	0	X	4

Sheet 4	1	2	3	4	5	6	7	8	Final
(Alberta) Serena Gray-Withers	0	1	1	3	1	5	X	X	11
(Alberta) Marla Sherrer 🔨	2	0	0	0	0	0	X	X	2

Sheet 5	1	2	3	4	5	6	7	8	Final
(Manitoba) Abby Ackland	0	4	0	1	0	0	2	0	7
(Manitoba) Kaitlyn Lawes 🔨	2	0	4	0	0	1	0	1	8

Sheet 6	1	2	3	4	5	6	7	8	Final
(Alberta) Selena Sturmay 🔨	2	0	0	0	3	0	1	0	6
(South Korea) Gim Eun-ji	0	1	0	1	0	2	0	3	7

Sheet 7	1	2	3	4	5	6	7	8	Final
(Manitoba) Kristy Watling	0	2	0	0	0	0	X	X	2
(Alberta) Claire Booth 🔨	2	0	1	1	1	2	X	X	7

=== Draw 11 ===
Sunday, October 30, 4:30 pm

Sheet 2	1	2	3	4	5	6	7	8	Final
(Alberta) Kelsey Rocque 🔨	0	1	0	2	1	0	X	X	4
(British Columbia) Clancy Grandy	1	0	3	0	0	4	X	X	8

Sheet 3	1	2	3	4	5	6	7	8	Final
(Alberta) Serena Gray-Withers 🔨	2	0	0	2	0	0	2	X	6
(Alberta) Claire Booth	0	1	1	0	1	1	0	X	4

Sheet 4	1	2	3	4	5	6	7	8	Final
(Manitoba) Jennifer Jones	0	0	2	2	2	0	3	X	9
(Manitoba) Chelsea Carey 🔨	2	0	0	0	0	1	0	X	3

Sheet 5	1	2	3	4	5	6	7	8	Final
(Germany) Daniela Jentsch	2	0	2	0	0	1	0	0	5
(South Korea) Gim Eun-ji 🔨	0	2	0	2	2	0	0	2	8

Sheet 6	1	2	3	4	5	6	7	8	Final
(Switzerland) Michèle Jäggi	0	2	0	1	2	3	X	X	8
(Alberta) Elysa Crough 🔨	1	0	0	0	0	0	X	X	1

Sheet 7	1	2	3	4	5	6	7	8	Final
(Alberta) Jessie Hunkin 🔨	3	0	0	0	1	3	0	X	7
(Japan) Ikue Kitazawa	0	1	2	1	0	0	1	X	5

Sheet 8	1	2	3	4	5	6	7	8	Final
(Manitoba) Beth Peterson	0	0	0	0	0	0	3	0	3
(Alberta) Selena Sturmay 🔨	1	0	1	1	0	1	0	2	6

=== Draw 12 ===
Sunday, October 30, 8:15 pm

Sheet 2	1	2	3	4	5	6	7	8	Final
(Switzerland) Michèle Jäggi 🔨	2	1	1	0	0	1	4	X	9
(Germany) Daniela Jentsch	0	0	0	1	0	0	0	X	1

Sheet 3	1	2	3	4	5	6	7	8	Final
(Manitoba) Jennifer Jones	0	2	2	0	0	7	X	X	11
(British Columbia) Clancy Grandy 🔨	1	0	0	1	1	0	X	X	3

Sheet 6	1	2	3	4	5	6	7	8	9	Final
(Alberta) Selena Sturmay 🔨	2	0	2	0	1	0	1	0	1	7
(Alberta) Jessie Hunkin	0	1	0	1	0	3	0	1	0	6

Sheet 7	1	2	3	4	5	6	7	8	Final
(Alberta) Serena Gray-Withers 🔨	1	0	0	0	1	0	1	X	3
(Manitoba) Abby Ackland	0	1	1	2	0	1	0	X	5

== Playoffs ==
Quarterfinals
A1	(Alberta) Casey Scheidegger	5
C3	(Alberta) Selena Sturmay	3
B2	(South Korea) Gim Eun-ji	7
C1	(Manitoba) Abby Ackland	4
A2	(Alberta) Kayla Skrlik	5
C2	(Manitoba) Jennifer Jones	8
B1	(Manitoba) Kaitlyn Lawes	5
C4	(Switzerland) Michèle Jäggi	6

Semifinals
A1	(Alberta) Casey Scheidegger	4
B2	(South Korea) Gim Eun-ji	5
C2	(Manitoba) Jennifer Jones	5
C4	(Switzerland) Michèle Jäggi	6

Final
B2	(South Korea) Gim Eun-ji	8
C4	(Switzerland) Michèle Jäggi	2

=== Quarterfinals ===
Monday, October 31, 9:00 am

Sheet 2	1	2	3	4	5	6	7	8	Final
(South Korea) Gim Eun-ji 🔨	2	0	0	1	1	0	2	1	7
(Manitoba) Abby Ackland	0	2	0	0	0	2	0	0	4

Sheet 3	1	2	3	4	5	6	7	8	Final
(Alberta) Casey Scheidegger 🔨	1	1	0	1	0	1	0	1	5
(Alberta) Selena Sturmay	0	0	1	0	1	0	1	0	3

Sheet 5	1	2	3	4	5	6	7	8	9	Final
(Alberta) Kayla Skrlik 🔨	0	1	0	2	0	1	1	0	0	5
(Manitoba) Jennifer Jones	0	0	1	0	1	0	0	3	3	8

Sheet 6	1	2	3	4	5	6	7	8	9	Final
(Manitoba) Kaitlyn Lawes 🔨	0	1	0	2	0	0	0	2	0	5
(Switzerland) Michèle Jäggi	0	0	0	0	2	2	1	0	1	6

=== Semifinals ===
Monday, October 31, 12:15 pm

Sheet 4	1	2	3	4	5	6	7	8	Final
(Manitoba) Jennifer Jones	1	1	0	1	0	2	0	0	5
(Switzerland) Michèle Jäggi 🔨	0	0	2	0	2	0	0	2	6

Sheet 5	1	2	3	4	5	6	7	8	Final
(Alberta) Casey Scheidegger 🔨	0	1	0	0	1	0	1	1	4
(South Korea) Gim Eun-ji	0	0	2	1	0	2	0	0	5

=== Final ===
Monday, October 31, 3:30 pm

Sheet 5	1	2	3	4	5	6	7	8	Final
(South Korea) Gim Eun-ji 🔨	2	2	0	1	0	3	X	X	8
(Switzerland) Michèle Jäggi	0	0	1	0	1	0	X	X	2
