= 2025 Alberta Women's Curling Championship =

Canadian provincial women's curling championship

2025 Alberta Women's Curling Championship Presented by Sentinel Storage
- Host city: Rimbey, Alberta
- Arena: Peter Lougheed Community Centre
- Dates: January 22–26
- Winner: Team Skrlik
- Curling club: Garrison CC, Calgary
- Skip: Kayla Skrlik
- Third: Margot Flemming
- Second: Ashton Skrlik
- Lead: Geri-Lynn Ramsay
- Alternate: Crystal Webster
- Coach: Shannon Kleibrink
- Finalist: Nicky Kaufman

The 2025 Alberta Women's Curling Championship presented by Sentinel Storage, the provincial women's curling championship for Alberta, was held from January 22 to 26 at the Peter Lougheed Community Centre in Rimbey, Alberta. The winning Kayla Skrlik rink represented Alberta at the 2025 Scotties Tournament of Hearts in Thunder Bay, Ontario.

The format of the tournament was changed from an 8-team round robin and a 3-team playoff to a 12-team triple knockout and a 4-team page playoff. This now matches the format of their provincial men's championship counterpart, the Boston Pizza Cup.

== Qualification Process ==
Qualification method	Berths	Qualifying teams
WCT Leaders	3	Kayla Skrlik; Myla Plett; Gracelyn Richards
Alberta Curling Tour Points	~~2~~ 1	Robyn Silvernagle; ~~Selena Sturmay~~ (Note: Team Selena Sturmay initially received a pre-qualifying berth to provincials via Alberta Curling Tour (ACT) points. However, on January 3, Curling Canada announced that Team Sturmay would replace Team Chelsea Carey of Manitoba as one of the pre-qualified teams for the 2025 Scotties after Team Carey forfeited their 2025 Scotties pre-qualification berth due to no longer meeting minimum player requirements. Since Team Sturmay no longer needed to qualify via provincials, Curling Alberta added another qualification berth to the Last Chance Qualifier to replace Sturmay's spot.)
Grande Prairie Qualifier (Note: The Grande Prairie qualifier was not held due to only three teams registering, two of which were already pre-qualified based on either WCT or ACT points and thus did not have to compete in provincial qualifiers. The remaining team, Team Janais DeJong received the berth.)	1	Janais DeJong
Jasper Place Qualifier	4	Nicky Kaufman; Michelle Hartwell; Claire Booth; Elliot Martens
Last Chance Brooks Qualifier	~~2~~ 3	Hannah Phillips; Kayleigh Shannon; Keelie Duncan

== Teams ==
The teams are listed as follows:

Skip	Third	Second	Lead	Alternate	Coach	Club(s)
Claire Booth	Jamie Scott	Sydney Libbus	Sophie Brissette	Morgan Muise	Mike Libbus	Ellerslie CC, Edmonton
Janais DeJong	Stephanie Malekoff	Delia DeJong	Rae-Lynn Beattie			Grande Prairie CC, Grande Prairie
Keelie Duncan	Ava Koe	Elizabeth Morgan	Carley Hardie		Heather Rogers	The Glencoe Club, Calgary
Michelle Hartwell	Lisa Miller	Tori Hartwell	Ashley Kalk	Erica Wiese	Jim Weber	Sherwood Park CC, Sherwood Park
Elloit Martens	Kaylee Raniseth	Hailey Dupras	Kate Ector			Ellerslie CC, Edmonton; North Hill CC, Calgary; Red Deer CC, Red Deer
Nicky Kaufman	Karynn Flory	Kimberley Curtin	Krysta Hilker	Claire Murray	Taina Smiley	Thistle CC, Edmonton
Hannah Phillips	Kate Goodhelpsen	Anna Munroe	Sasha Tran		Mark Johnson	Crestwood CC, Edmonton
Myla Plett	Alyssa Nedohin	Chloe Fediuk	Allie Iskiw		David Nedohin; Blair Lenton	Saville Community SC, Edmonton
Gracelyn Richards	Emma Yarmuch	Sophia Ryhorchuk	Rachel Jacques	Amy Wheatcroft	Jessica Amundson	Saville Community SC, Edmonton
Kayleigh Shannon	Shianna Lind	Irelande McMahon	Madison Milot	Samantha Atkinson	Chris Lind	Calgary CC, Calgary
Robyn Silvernagle	Jessie Hunkin	Jessie Haughian	Kristie Moore		Lesley McEwan	Sexsmith CC, Sexsmith
Kayla Skrlik	Margot Flemming	Ashton Skrlik	Geri-Lynn Ramsay	Crystal Webster	Shannon Kleibrink	Garrison CC, Calgary

== Knockout Brackets ==
=== A Event ===
First Knockout	Qualifier 1
Kayla Skrlik	7
Michelle Hartwell	8	Michelle Hartwell	5
Claire Booth	5	Kayla Skrlik	6
Robyn Silvernagle	12
Robyn Silvernagle	8
Nicky Kaufman	6	Janais DeJong	2
Janais DeJong	8	Robyn Silvernagle	8
Gracelyn Richards	7
Myla Plett	7
Keelie Duncan	5	Kayleigh Shannon	9
Kayleigh Shannon	8	Kayleigh Shannon	3
Gracelyn Richards	10
Gracelyn Richards	6
Hannah Phillips	7	Hannah Phillips	3
Elloit Martens	6

=== B Event ===
Second Knockout	Qualifier 2
Claire Booth	2
Janais DeJong	10
Janais DeJong	12
Kayleigh Shannon	10
Janais DeJong	5
Kayla Skrlik	11
Elloit Martens	2
Myla Plett	7
Myla Plett	4
Kayla Skrlik	10
Kayla Skrlik	6
Gracelyn Richards	5
Keelie Duncan	8
Hannah Phillips	7
Keelie Duncan	8
Michelle Hartwell	10
Nicky Kaufman	7
Michelle Hartwell	10
Michelle Hartwell	4
Gracelyn Richards	6

=== C Event ===
Third Knockout	Qualifier 3
Michelle Hartwell	7
Claire Booth	3	Elloit Martens	2
Elloit Martens	10	Michelle Hartwell	3
Janais DeJong	11
Keelie Duncan	1
Janais DeJong	10

Third Knockout	Qualifier 4
Hannah Phillips	6
Gracelyn Richards	3
Kayleigh Shannon	8
Kayleigh Shannon	4	Nicky Kaufman	9
Nicky Kaufman	10
Nicky Kaufman	8
Myla Plett	7

== Knockout Results ==
All draw times are listed in Mountain Time (UTC-07:00).

=== Draw 1 ===
Wednesday, January 22, 1:00 pm

Sheet A	1	2	3	4	5	6	7	8	9	10	Final
Hannah Phillips	0	0	1	0	0	2	0	2	0	2	7
Elloit Martens	0	1	0	0	2	0	2	0	1	0	6

Sheet B	1	2	3	4	5	6	7	8	9	10	Final
Michelle Hartwell	0	0	0	3	0	2	0	1	2	X	8
Claire Booth	1	0	1	0	1	0	2	0	0	X	5

Sheet C	1	2	3	4	5	6	7	8	9	10	Final
Nicky Kaufman	0	0	0	0	1	1	2	0	2	0	6
Janais DeJong	0	0	1	1	0	0	0	3	0	3	8

Sheet D	1	2	3	4	5	6	7	8	9	10	Final
Keelie Duncan	1	1	0	1	0	2	0	0	0	X	5
Kayleigh Shannon	0	0	1	0	2	0	2	1	2	X	8

=== Draw 2 ===
Wednesday, January 22, 7:00 pm

Sheet A	1	2	3	4	5	6	7	8	9	10	Final
Myla Plett	1	2	0	1	0	1	0	2	0	0	7
Kayleigh Shannon	0	0	1	0	3	0	0	0	3	2	9

Sheet B	1	2	3	4	5	6	7	8	9	10	Final
Gracelyn Richards	0	0	1	0	3	0	1	0	1	X	6
Hannah Phillips	0	0	0	1	0	1	0	1	0	X	3

Sheet C	1	2	3	4	5	6	7	8	9	10	Final
Kayla Skrlik	0	2	0	2	2	0	0	0	1	X	7
Michelle Hartwell	2	0	2	0	0	0	1	0	0	X	5

Sheet D	1	2	3	4	5	6	7	8	9	10	Final
Robyn Silvernagle	2	0	2	1	3	0	X	X	X	X	8
Janais DeJong	0	1	0	0	0	1	X	X	X	X	2

=== Draw 3 ===
Thursday, January 23, 9:00 am

Sheet A	1	2	3	4	5	6	7	8	9	10	Final
Claire Booth	0	0	1	0	0	1	0	0	X	X	2
Janais DeJong	2	1	0	2	2	0	1	2	X	X	10

Sheet B	1	2	3	4	5	6	7	8	9	10	Final
Elloit Martens	0	0	1	0	0	0	1	0	0	X	2
Myla Plett	2	1	0	0	1	1	0	1	1	X	7

=== Draw 4 ===
Thursday, January 23, 2:00 pm

Sheet A	1	2	3	4	5	6	7	8	9	10	Final
Kayla Skrlik	0	0	2	2	1	0	1	0	0	0	6
Robyn Silvernagle	0	2	0	0	0	3	0	1	1	5	12

Sheet B	1	2	3	4	5	6	7	8	9	10	Final
Nicky Kaufman	0	2	0	0	0	3	0	0	2	0	7
Michelle Hartwell	1	0	1	2	1	0	1	2	0	2	10

Sheet C	1	2	3	4	5	6	7	8	9	10	Final
Keelie Duncan	0	0	0	2	2	0	3	0	1	0	8
Hannah Phillips	1	2	1	0	0	1	0	1	0	1	7

Sheet D	1	2	3	4	5	6	7	8	9	10	Final
Kayleigh Shannon	0	1	0	0	0	1	1	0	X	X	3
Gracelyn Richards	1	0	0	3	2	0	0	4	X	X	10

=== Draw 5 ===
Thursday, January 23, 7:00 pm

Sheet A	1	2	3	4	5	6	7	8	9	10	Final
Keelie Duncan	0	2	0	3	0	1	0	0	2	0	8
Michelle Hartwell	1	0	2	0	1	0	1	3	0	2	10

Sheet B	1	2	3	4	5	6	7	8	9	10	Final
Robyn Silvernagle	0	0	1	0	0	4	1	0	1	1	8
Gracelyn Richards	0	1	0	2	1	0	0	3	0	0	7

Sheet C	1	2	3	4	5	6	7	8	9	10	Final
Myla Plett	0	2	0	2	0	0	0	0	0	X	4
Kayla Skrlik	0	0	1	0	1	1	4	1	2	X	10

Sheet D	1	2	3	4	5	6	7	8	9	10	11	Final
Janais DeJong	1	0	3	0	1	1	0	0	4	0	2	12
Kayleigh Shannon	0	1	0	2	0	0	1	3	0	3	0	10

=== Draw 6 ===
Friday, January 24, 8:30 am

Sheet A	1	2	3	4	5	6	7	8	9	10	Final
Hannah Phillips	2	0	0	0	0	1	0	2	1	X	6
Kayleigh Shannon	0	1	0	1	2	0	4	0	0	X	8

Sheet B	1	2	3	4	5	6	7	8	9	10	11	Final
Nicky Kaufman	2	0	0	2	0	1	0	2	0	0	1	8
Myla Plett	0	2	0	0	2	0	1	0	1	1	0	7

Sheet D	1	2	3	4	5	6	7	8	9	10	Final
Claire Booth	0	0	2	0	0	1	0	X	X	X	3
Elloit Martens	2	2	0	1	2	0	3	X	X	X	10

=== Draw 7 ===
Friday, January 24, 1:30 pm

Sheet A	1	2	3	4	5	6	7	8	9	10	Final
Janais DeJong	0	1	0	0	2	0	2	0	X	X	5
Kayla Skrlik	1	0	0	4	0	4	0	2	X	X	11

Sheet C	1	2	3	4	5	6	7	8	9	10	Final
Michelle Hartwell	0	0	0	0	1	0	1	0	2	0	4
Gracelyn Richards	0	0	0	1	0	2	0	1	0	2	6

=== Draw 8 ===
Friday, January 24, 6:30 pm

Sheet A	1	2	3	4	5	6	7	8	9	10	Final
Michelle Hartwell	0	1	0	3	0	1	0	2	X	X	7
Elloit Martens	0	0	0	0	1	0	1	0	X	X	2

Sheet B	1	2	3	4	5	6	7	8	9	10	Final
Kayla Skrlik	1	0	0	0	0	2	0	0	0	3	6
Gracelyn Richards	0	2	0	0	1	0	1	1	0	0	5

Sheet C	1	2	3	4	5	6	7	8	9	10	Final
Kayleigh Shannon	0	0	3	0	0	0	0	1	X	X	4
Nicky Kaufman	1	1	0	2	1	3	2	0	X	X	10

Sheet D	1	2	3	4	5	6	7	8	9	10	Final
Keelie Duncan	0	0	0	0	1	X	X	X	X	X	1
Janais DeJong	2	3	1	4	0	X	X	X	X	X	10

=== Draw 9 ===
Saturday, January 25, 11:00 am

Sheet A	1	2	3	4	5	6	7	8	9	10	Final
Gracelyn Richards	1	0	0	1	0	1	0	X	X	X	3
Nicky Kaufman	0	1	1	0	3	0	4	X	X	X	9

Sheet C	1	2	3	4	5	6	7	8	9	10	Final
Michelle Hartwell	0	2	0	1	0	0	0	X	X	X	3
Janais DeJong	1	0	2	0	2	2	4	X	X	X	11

== Playoffs ==
Page playoff system
A	Robyn Silvernagle	5
B	Kayla Skrlik	8
C1	Janais DeJong	5
C2	Nicky Kaufman	7

Semifinal
A	Robyn Silvernagle	4
C2	Nicky Kaufman	5

Final
B	Kayla Skrlik	6
C2	Nicky Kaufman	5

=== A vs. B ===
Saturday, January 25, 6:30 pm

Sheet B	1	2	3	4	5	6	7	8	9	10	Final
Robyn Silvernagle	2	0	0	0	2	0	0	1	0	X	5
Kayla Skrlik	0	0	1	1	0	2	2	0	2	X	8

=== C1 vs. C2 ===
Saturday, January 25, 6:30 pm

Sheet D	1	2	3	4	5	6	7	8	9	10	Final
Janais DeJong	0	1	0	1	0	1	1	1	0	0	5
Nicky Kaufman	3	0	1	0	1	0	0	0	1	1	7

=== Semifinal ===
Sunday, January 28, 10:00 am

Sheet B	1	2	3	4	5	6	7	8	9	10	Final
Robyn Silvernagle	0	0	2	0	0	1	0	0	1	0	4
Nicky Kaufman	0	0	0	0	1	0	0	2	0	2	5

=== Final ===
Sunday, January 28, 3:00 pm

Sheet B	1	2	3	4	5	6	7	8	9	10	Final
Kayla Skrlik	1	0	2	0	0	2	0	0	0	1	6
Nicky Kaufman	0	1	0	1	0	0	2	1	0	0	5

2025 Alberta Women's Curling Championship

Kayla Skrlik
2nd Alberta Provincial Championship title
