= 2023 Alberta Scotties Tournament of Hearts =

Canadian provincial women's curling championship

2023 Sentinel Storage Alberta Scotties Tournament of Hearts
- Host city: Wetaskiwin, Alberta
- Arena: Wetaskiwin Civic Centre Twin Arena
- Dates: January 18–22
- Winner: Team Skrlik
- Curling club: Garrison CC, Calgary
- Skip: Kayla Skrlik
- Third: Brittany Tran
- Second: Geri-Lynn Ramsay
- Lead: Ashton Skrlik
- Alternate: Crystal Webster
- Coach: Shannon Kleibrink
- Finalist: Casey Scheidegger

The 2023 Sentinel Storage Alberta Scotties Tournament of Hearts, the provincial women's curling championship for Alberta, was held from January 18 to 22 at the Wetaskiwin Civic Centre Twin Arena in Wetaskiwin, Alberta. The winning Kayla Skrlik rink from Calgary represented Alberta at the 2023 Scotties Tournament of Hearts in Kamloops, British Columbia, and finished sixth in Pool A with a 4–4 record.

In the final against Lethbridge's Casey Scheidegger, Skrlik won the game on her last shot, a "come-around double takeout" to score two points, resulting in a jubilant celebration that went viral in the curling world. Skrlik's rink won all eight of their games in the tournament.

Despite losing in the final, the Scheidegger rink still qualified for the Scotties as the Wild Card #2 representative based on CTRS standings, which they finished sixth in Pool B with a 3–5 record.

== Qualification process ==
Qualification method	Berths	Qualifying teams
CTRS Leaders	2	Casey Scheidegger; Jessie Hunkin
Excel Points Leader	2	Kayla Skrlik; Selena Sturmay
Rimbey Qualifier	2	Kelsey Rocque; Kellie Stiksma
Edmonton Qualifier	2	Gracelyn Richards; Lisa Parent

== Teams ==
The teams are listed as follows:

Skip	Third	Second	Lead	Alternate	Club(s)
Jessie Hunkin	Kristen Streifel	Becca Hebert	Dayna Demers		Spruce Grove CC, Spruce Grove
Lisa Parent	Sophie Brissette	Kaitlin Zeller	Megan Johnson	Amanda Sluchinski	Calgary CC, Calgary
Gracelyn Richards	Rachel Jacques	Amy Wheatcroft	Anna Munroe		Saville Community SC, Edmonton
Kelsey Rocque	Danielle Schmiemann	Dana Ferguson	Rachelle Brown	Zoe Cinnamon	Saville Community SC, Edmonton
Casey Scheidegger	Kate Hogan	Jessie Haughian	Taylor McDonald	Heather Rogers	Lethbridge CC, Lethbridge
Kayla Skrlik	Brittany Tran	Geri-Lynn Ramsay	Ashton Skrlik	Crystal Webster	Garrison CC, Calgary
Kellie Stiksma	Nicole Larson	Jamie Scott	Bailey Horte		Sherwood Park CC, Sherwood Park
Selena Sturmay	Heather Nedohin (Note: Heather Nedohin and Dacey Brown replaced Abby Marks and Paige Papley.)	Kate Goodhelpsen	Dacey Brown		The Glencoe Club, Calgary

== Round-robin standings ==
Final round-robin standings

Key
Teams to Playoffs

Skip	W	L	PF	PA	EW	EL	BE	SE
Kayla Skrlik	7	0	59	28	33	20	4	12
Casey Scheidegger	6	1	50	35	27	24	5	5
Selena Sturmay	5	2	57	32	27	25	4	6
Kelsey Rocque	4	3	49	39	30	22	0	11
Jessie Hunkin	3	4	38	43	25	24	3	7
Gracelyn Richards	2	5	32	56	20	26	5	4
Kellie Stiksma	1	6	40	56	22	30	1	3
Lisa Parent	0	7	23	59	28	31	3	1

== Round-robin results ==
All draw times are listed in Mountain Time (UTC-07:00).

=== Draw 1 ===
Wednesday, January 18, 10:00 am

Sheet A	1	2	3	4	5	6	7	8	9	10	Final
Selena Sturmay 🔨	0	0	5	2	0	1	0	3	X	X	11
Kellie Stiksma	0	0	0	0	1	0	1	0	X	X	2

Sheet B	1	2	3	4	5	6	7	8	9	10	Final
Gracelyn Richards	0	0	0	1	0	0	3	0	0	0	4
Kayla Skrlik 🔨	1	0	1	0	1	0	0	1	1	1	6

Sheet C	1	2	3	4	5	6	7	8	9	10	Final
Lisa Parent	0	1	0	0	1	0	1	0	2	X	5
Casey Scheidegger 🔨	1	0	1	0	0	4	0	2	0	X	8

Sheet D	1	2	3	4	5	6	7	8	9	10	Final
Jessie Hunkin 🔨	0	0	1	0	0	0	0	1	0	X	2
Kelsey Rocque	0	1	0	1	1	1	1	0	1	X	6

=== Draw 2 ===
Wednesday, January 18, 6:30 pm

Sheet A	1	2	3	4	5	6	7	8	9	10	Final
Gracelyn Richards	0	0	1	0	2	0	X	X	X	X	3
Casey Scheidegger 🔨	1	3	0	2	0	3	X	X	X	X	9

Sheet B	1	2	3	4	5	6	7	8	9	10	Final
Selena Sturmay	0	2	0	0	1	1	0	3	0	X	7
Kelsey Rocque 🔨	1	0	1	1	0	0	1	0	1	X	5

Sheet C	1	2	3	4	5	6	7	8	9	10	Final
Jessie Hunkin 🔨	0	1	1	1	0	2	0	1	1	X	7
Kellie Stiksma	0	0	0	0	2	0	1	0	0	X	3

Sheet D	1	2	3	4	5	6	7	8	9	10	Final
Lisa Parent	0	2	0	2	0	1	0	0	0	X	5
Kayla Skrlik 🔨	0	0	3	0	2	0	0	2	1	X	8

=== Draw 3 ===
Thursday, January 19, 10:00 am

Sheet A	1	2	3	4	5	6	7	8	9	10	Final
Jessie Hunkin	0	2	0	2	0	2	0	0	2	X	8
Lisa Parent 🔨	1	0	2	0	0	0	2	0	0	X	5

Sheet B	1	2	3	4	5	6	7	8	9	10	Final
Kellie Stiksma 🔨	3	0	1	0	2	0	1	0	2	X	9
Casey Scheidegger	0	3	0	2	0	2	0	4	0	X	11

Sheet C	1	2	3	4	5	6	7	8	9	10	Final
Kelsey Rocque 🔨	0	0	1	0	1	0	X	X	X	X	2
Kayla Skrlik	2	1	0	3	0	4	X	X	X	X	10

Sheet D	1	2	3	4	5	6	7	8	9	10	Final
Selena Sturmay 🔨	4	0	0	0	4	0	3	X	X	X	11
Gracelyn Richards	0	1	1	1	0	1	0	X	X	X	4

=== Draw 4 ===
Thursday, January 19, 6:30 pm

Sheet A	1	2	3	4	5	6	7	8	9	10	Final
Casey Scheidegger 🔨	0	0	0	0	2	0	0	1	0	X	3
Kayla Skrlik	0	2	0	1	0	2	1	0	3	X	9

Sheet B	1	2	3	4	5	6	7	8	9	10	Final
Jessie Hunkin	0	4	0	1	0	0	1	X	X	X	6
Selena Sturmay 🔨	2	0	3	0	4	2	0	X	X	X	11

Sheet C	1	2	3	4	5	6	7	8	9	10	Final
Gracelyn Richards 🔨	1	0	3	0	1	0	0	4	1	X	10
Lisa Parent	0	2	0	2	0	1	0	0	0	X	5

Sheet D	1	2	3	4	5	6	7	8	9	10	Final
Kelsey Rocque 🔨	0	0	1	1	0	1	2	0	4	X	9
Kellie Stiksma	1	2	0	0	3	0	0	1	0	X	7

=== Draw 5 ===
Friday, January 20, 10:00 am

Sheet A	1	2	3	4	5	6	7	8	9	10	Final
Lisa Parent	0	0	0	0	0	1	0	X	X	X	1
Selena Sturmay 🔨	1	0	1	3	1	0	3	X	X	X	9

Sheet B	1	2	3	4	5	6	7	8	9	10	Final
Kayla Skrlik 🔨	0	2	1	2	0	0	1	0	2	X	8
Kellie Stiksma	0	0	0	0	2	1	0	1	0	X	4

Sheet C	1	2	3	4	5	6	7	8	9	10	Final
Casey Scheidegger 🔨	0	2	0	0	2	0	1	0	1	X	6
Kelsey Rocque	0	0	2	0	0	1	0	1	0	X	4

Sheet D	1	2	3	4	5	6	7	8	9	10	Final
Gracelyn Richards	0	0	0	1	0	0	X	X	X	X	1
Jessie Hunkin 🔨	1	0	1	0	3	3	X	X	X	X	8

=== Draw 6 ===
Friday, January 20, 4:00 pm

Sheet A	1	2	3	4	5	6	7	8	9	10	Final
Kayla Skrlik 🔨	4	0	1	0	4	0	2	X	X	X	11
Jessie Hunkin	0	1	0	2	0	1	0	X	X	X	4

Sheet B	1	2	3	4	5	6	7	8	9	10	Final
Kelsey Rocque 🔨	2	2	0	3	1	0	1	2	X	X	11
Lisa Parent	0	0	2	0	0	2	0	0	X	X	4

Sheet C	1	2	3	4	5	6	7	8	9	10	Final
Kellie Stiksma	0	0	1	0	0	0	2	0	2	X	5
Gracelyn Richards 🔨	0	2	0	2	0	2	0	1	0	X	7

Sheet D	1	2	3	4	5	6	7	8	9	10	Final
Casey Scheidegger	1	0	0	2	0	1	1	0	2	X	7
Selena Sturmay 🔨	0	0	0	0	1	0	0	1	0	X	2

=== Draw 7 ===
Saturday, January 21, 10:00 am

Sheet A	1	2	3	4	5	6	7	8	9	10	Final
Kelsey Rocque	3	0	4	0	5	X	X	X	X	X	12
Gracelyn Richards 🔨	0	2	0	1	0	X	X	X	X	X	3

Sheet B	1	2	3	4	5	6	7	8	9	10	Final
Casey Scheidegger 🔨	0	2	1	0	0	0	1	0	2	X	6
Jessie Hunkin	1	0	0	1	0	0	0	1	0	X	3

Sheet C	1	2	3	4	5	6	7	8	9	10	Final
Kayla Skrlik	0	1	0	1	2	0	2	0	1	0	7
Selena Sturmay 🔨	1	0	1	0	0	1	0	2	0	1	6

Sheet D	1	2	3	4	5	6	7	8	9	10	Final
Kellie Stiksma 🔨	2	1	0	7	0	X	X	X	X	X	10
Lisa Parent	0	0	1	0	2	X	X	X	X	X	3

== Playoffs ==
Semifinal			Final
			1	Kayla Skrlik	9
2	Casey Scheidegger	11	2	Casey Scheidegger	8
3	Selena Sturmay	3

=== Semifinal ===
Saturday, January 21, 6:30 pm

Sheet B	1	2	3	4	5	6	7	8	9	10	Final
Casey Scheidegger 🔨	0	2	1	0	2	1	0	5	X	X	11
Selena Sturmay	0	0	0	2	0	0	1	0	X	X	3

=== Final ===
Sunday, January 22, 10:00 am

Sheet B	1	2	3	4	5	6	7	8	9	10	Final
Kayla Skrlik 🔨	1	0	2	0	2	0	0	2	0	2	9
Casey Scheidegger	0	1	0	3	0	2	0	0	2	0	8

2023 Alberta Scotties Tournament of Hearts

Kayla Skrlik
1st Alberta Provincial Championship title
