= The Good Times Bonspiel =

World Curling Tour event

- Established: 2013
- Host city: Calgary, Alberta
- Arena: Calgary Curling Club
- Men's purse: $1,000 (2019)
- Women's purse: $1,000 (2019)

Current champions (2019)
- Men: (Alberta) Daylan Vavrek
- Women: (Alberta) Kayla Skrlik

The Good Times Bonspiel (previously known as Good Times Bonspiel) is an annual bonspiel, or curling tournament, held at the Calgary Curling Club in Calgary, Alberta. The tournament is held in a double knockout format. The tournament started in 2013 as part of the World Curling Tour's regional developmental series of events. After the 2014–15 season, the event was discontinued until it returned for the 2019–20 season under the new name, The Good Times Bonspiel.

== Past champions ==
=== Men ===
| Year | Winning team | Runner up team | Purse (CAD) |
|---|---|---|---|
| 2013 | (Alberta) Terry Meek, Adrian Bakker, Eugene Doherty, Keith Mason | (Alberta) Bert Martin, Rhett Friesz, Jon Rennie, Brad Kokoroyannis | $8,000 |
| 2014 | (Alberta) Aaron Sluchinski, Justin Sluchinski, Dylan Webster, Eric Richard | (Alberta) Matthew Blandford, Darren Moulding, Brent Hamilton, Brad Chyz | $8,000 |
| 2019 | (Alberta) Daylan Vavrek, Dean Mamer, Carter Lautner, Evan Asmussen | (Alberta) Cole Adams, Riley Helston, Joshua Kiist, Tyson Toews | $1,000 |
| 2020 | Event cancelled due to the COVID-19 pandemic | | |

=== Women ===
| Year | Winning team | Runner up team | Purse (CAD) |
|---|---|---|---|
| 2013 | (Alberta) Cheryl Bernard, Susan O'Connor, Lori Olson-Johns, Shannon Aleksic | (Alberta) Jocelyn Peterman, Brittany Tran, Rebecca Konschuh, Kristine Anderson | $8,000 |
| 2014 | (Alberta) Morgan Muise, Lyndsay Allen, Sarah Evans, Sara Gartner-Frey | (Saskatchewan) Jessica Hanson, Kourtney Fesser, Krista Fesser, Brie Spilchen | $8,000 |
| 2019 | (Alberta) Kayla Skrlik, Lindsay Makichuk, Brittany Tran, Hope Sunley | (Russia) Alina Kovaleva, Maria Komarova, Galina Arsenkina, Ekaterina Kuzmina | $1,000 |
| 2020 | Event cancelled due to the COVID-19 pandemic | | |
