= Margot Flemming =

Canadian curler

- Curler
- Born: December 9, 1993 (age 32); Kitchener–Waterloo, Ontario

Team
- Curling club: Yellowknife CC, Yellowknife, NT
- Skip: Selena Njegovan
- Third: Erin Pincott
- Second: Margot Flemming
- Lead: Krysten Karwacki

Curling career
- Member Association: Ontario (2012–2020); Northwest Territories (2020–2024); Alberta (2024–2026); Manitoba (2026–present)
- Hearts: 6 (2021, 2022, 2023, 2024, 2025, 2026)
- Top CTRS ranking: 3rd (2024–25)

Margot Sutherland Flemming (born December 9, 1993) is a Canadian curler from Yellowknife, Northwest Territories. She currently plays second on Team Selena Njegovan.

== Career ==
=== Juniors ===
While in juniors, Flemming played third for Kendall Haymes. Despite not winning a provincial junior title, the team did win the U18 Ontario Curling Championships in 2010 with second Cassie Savage and lead Megan Arnold.

=== Women's ===
Flemming and her team skipped by Shannon Jay qualified for the 2015 Ontario Scotties Tournament of Hearts by winning their regional qualifier. At the provincial championship, the team finished in ninth place with a 3–6 round robin record. The following season, Flemming left the Jay rink and joined Team Kerry Lackie. On the tour, the team missed the playoffs in all three of their events. They weren't able to qualify for the 2016 Ontario Scotties Tournament of Hearts either, losing out in their regional qualifier.

After taking a season off, Flemming joined the Susan Froud rink for the 2017–18 season. The team had a very successful season on tour, qualifying for the playoffs in six of their eight events, including a win at the Stroud Sleeman Cash Spiel. They reached the final of the Biosteel Oakville Fall Classic and the KW Fall Classic, semifinals of the Listowel Women's Classic and the US Open of Curling and the quarterfinals of the NAVY Fall Classic Open Bonspiel. Despite their successful season on tour, the team was unable to qualify for the 2018 Ontario Scotties Tournament of Hearts. The following season, Team Froud only qualified in two of their seven events and did not win any titles. They also competed in the 2018 Tour Challenge Tier 2 event, losing in a tiebreaker to Kelsey Rocque. They were able to qualify for the 2019 Ontario Scotties Tournament of Hearts, however, they finished in seventh place with a 2–5 record. After failing to make it to the 2020 Ontario Scotties Tournament of Hearts, Flemming moved to the Northwest Territories and joined the Kerry Galusha rink as their second.

During the abbreviated 2020–21 season, Team Galusha won the 2021 Northwest Territories Scotties Tournament of Hearts and qualified for the 2021 Scotties Tournament of Hearts, Flemming's first national competition. The Tournament of Hearts was held in a bio-secure "bubble" to prevent spread of the COVID-19 virus. Team Galusha finished the round robin with a 4–4 record, just missing the championship pool.

Team Galusha had a great start to the 2021–22 season, beginning with the Stu Sells Oakville Tankard where they lost in the final to Team Hollie Duncan. The following week, they won the KW Fall Classic after defeating the Duncan rink in the championship game. Due to the COVID-19 pandemic in Canada, the qualification process for the 2021 Canadian Olympic Curling Trials had to be modified to qualify enough teams for the championship. In these modifications, Curling Canada created the 2021 Canadian Curling Pre-Trials Direct-Entry Event, an event where eight teams would compete to try to earn one of two spots into the 2021 Canadian Olympic Curling Pre-Trials. Team Galusha qualified for the Pre-Trials Direct-Entry Event as the fourth seed. The team qualified for the playoffs by going 3–0 in the A Event and then defeated Team Robyn Silvernagle (skipped by Jessie Hunkin) 10–8 to earn the first spot in the Pre-Trials. The next month, the team competed in the Pre-Trials where they finished with a 1–5 record, only beating Team Penny Barker. The 2022 Northwest Territories Scotties Tournament of Hearts was cancelled due to the pandemic and Team Galusha were selected to represent the Territories at the national women's championship. At the 2022 Scotties Tournament of Hearts, the team finished the round robin with a 5–3 record, qualifying them for a tiebreaker against Manitoba's Mackenzie Zacharias. Team Galusha won the tiebreaker 8–6, earning themselves a spot in the playoffs and becoming the first team solely representing the Northwest Territories to qualify for the playoffs in Scotties history. They then lost in the first game of the playoff round to New Brunswick's Andrea Crawford and were eliminated from contention.

To begin the 2022–23 season, Team Galusha reached the quarterfinals of the 2022 Saville Shoot-Out where they lost to Casey Scheidegger. They then played in the 2022 PointsBet Invitational where they again lost to the Scheidegger rink in the opening round. The team continued to have success on tour in October, reaching the semifinals of the 2022 Tour Challenge Tier 2 Slam and the quarterfinals of the North Grenville Women's Fall Curling Classic. In the new year, they again went undefeated to win the 2023 Northwest Territories Scotties Tournament of Hearts, defeating Reese Wainman 8–1 in the final. Representing the Territories at the 2023 Scotties Tournament of Hearts, Team Galusha started the event with a 3–1 record before losing their next three games. They won their final game against the Yukon to finish fourth in their pool with a 4–4 record, missing the playoffs.

The Galusha rink did not have as much success on tour the following season, only reaching the playoffs in two of their first six events. This included a semifinal finish at the Alberta Tour Kick-off and a quarterfinal appearance at the 2023 KW Fall Classic. In December, the team went undefeated at the Stu Sells Brantford Nissan Classic until the final where they lost to Courtney Auld. After winning the 2024 Northwest Territories Scotties Tournament of Hearts, the team announced the 2024 Scotties Tournament of Hearts would be their last event together as they would disband at the end of the season. At the Hearts, the team finished fifth in their pool with a 3–5 record. This included defeating Manitoba's Jennifer Jones in their final round robin game and having the largest comeback in Scotties history, overcoming a seven-point deficit after three ends to defeat Ontario's Danielle Inglis 10–9.

On March 26, 2024, it was announced Flemming would join the Kayla Skrlik rink from Alberta for the 2024–25 season. She would play third, with second Geri-Lynn Ramsay and lead Ashton Skrlik rounding out the team. In their first year together, the Skrlik rink won the 2025 Alberta Women's Curling Championship against Nicky Kaufman, where they would go on to represent Alberta at the 2025 Scotties Tournament of Hearts. At the 2025 Scotties, the team went 6–2 in the round robin, and then lost to Nova Scotia's Christina Black 8–7 in the 3v4 game, finishing 4th. The team also had a successful year on the Tour, finishing second at the 2024 PointsBet Invitational, and winning the Martensville International. This success qualified them for their first Tier 1 Grand Slam of Curling event at the 2025 Masters, where they finished with a 1–3 record.

=== Mixed ===
Flemming represented the Northwest Territories at the 2021 Canadian Mixed Curling Championship playing third for Jamie Koe. The team finished 9–1 through the round robin and championship pools. They then dropped the semifinal to Quebec before claiming the bronze medal with a victory over New Brunswick. The team returned the following and again reached the playoffs with a 7–3 record. After a 6–5 loss to Northern Ontario in the semifinal, they defeated British Columbia to claim a second bronze medal. In 2023, they just missed the playoffs with a 6–4 record.

== Personal life ==
Flemming is currently a PhD student at the University of Waterloo, studying geography, researching the use of satellite observations for snow monitoring in the Northwest Territories. She is married to Dylan Price.

== Teams ==
Season	Skip	Third	Second	Lead
2009–10	Kendall Haymes	Margot Flemming	Cassie Savage	Megan Arnold
2010–11	Kendall Haymes	Margot Flemming	Cassie Savage	Megan Arnold
2011–12	Kendall Haymes	Margot Flemming	Cassie Savage	Megan Arnold
2012–13	Kendall Haymes	Margot Flemming	Cassie Savage	Megan Arnold
2013–14	Shannon Kee	Pam Feldkamp	Margot Flemming	Halyna Tepylo
2014–15	Shannon Kee	Pam Feldkamp	Margot Flemming	Halyna Tepylo
2015–16	Kerry Lackie	Pam Feldkamp	Margot Flemming	Halyna Tepylo
2017–18	Susan Froud	Lauren Horton	Margot Flemming	Megan Arnold
2018–19	Susan Froud	Lauren Horton	Margot Flemming	Megan Arnold
2019–20	Lauren Horton	Carly Howard	Margot Flemming	Megan Arnold
2020–21	Kerry Galusha	Sarah Koltun	Jo-Ann Rizzo	Margot Flemming
2021–22	Jo-Ann Rizzo (Fourth)	Sarah Koltun	Margot Flemming	Kerry Galusha (Skip)
2022–23	Jo-Ann Rizzo (Fourth)	Margot Flemming	Sarah Koltun	Kerry Galusha (Skip)
2023–24	Jo-Ann Rizzo (Fourth)	Margot Flemming	Sarah Koltun	Kerry Galusha (Skip)
2024–25	Kayla Skrlik	Margot Flemming	Ashton Skrlik	Geri-Lynn Ramsay
2025–26	Kayla Skrlik	Margot Flemming	Ashton Skrlik	Geri-Lynn Ramsay
2026–27	Selena Njegovan	Erin Pincott	Margot Flemming	Krysten Karwacki
