= Ashton Skrlik =

Canadian curler

- Curler
- Born: May 9, 1999 (age 27); Nampa, Alberta

Team
- Curling club: Garrison CC, Calgary, AB

Curling career
- Member Association: Alberta
- Hearts: 3 (2023, 2025, 2026)
- Top CTRS ranking: 3rd (2024–25)
Medal record
Women's curling
Representing Alberta North
Arctic Winter Games
Gold medal – first place	2014 Fairbanks

Ashton Skrlik (born May 9, 1999) is a Canadian curler from Calgary, Alberta.

== Career ==
Skrlik played third for her sister Kayla Skrlik's rink when the team represented Alberta at the 2016 U18 International Curling Championships. There, the team finished with a 3–2 round robin record, just missing the playoffs. She represented Alberta at her first junior nationals at the 2018 Canadian Junior Curling Championships. At the championship, Skrlik and her team of skip Kayla Skrlik, second Hope Sunley and lead Megan Johnson finished with a 4–2 round robin record, enough to qualify for the championship round. They then went 3–1 against the other pool, however, this was not enough to qualify for the playoffs and they finished in fourth place with a 7–3 record. Also in her junior career, Skrlik played third on the Northern Alberta team that won a gold medal at the 2014 Arctic Winter Games.

Out of juniors, Team Skrlik began competing on the World Curling Tour. For the 2018–19 season, they brought on Brenna Bilassy as their new lead, replacing Johnson. Of their three events played, they reached the quarterfinals of the Avonair Cash Spiel and the Boundary Ford Curling Classic. Skrlik then left her sister's rink for her last year of junior eligibility before rejoining at lead for the 2020–21 season. The team also included third Selena Sturmay and second Brittany Tran. They were unable to play in any events, however, due to the COVID-19 pandemic.

Following the abbreviated season, Sturmay left the team and was replaced by Geri-Lynn Ramsay at third. The team was able to find immediate success by reaching the semifinals of the Alberta Curling Series: Leduc event. They also made the semifinals of the Ladies Alberta Open and were finalists at the Alberta Curling Series: Thistle event to Germany's Daniela Jentsch. In December 2021, they qualified for the 2022 Alberta Scotties Tournament of Hearts by defeating Lindsay Bertsch in the final qualifier. At provincials, the team finished in last place with a 1–6 record. Back on the tour, they reached the final of the Alberta Curling Tour Championship where they lost to Abby Marks. Team Skrlik rounded out their season at the 2022 Best of the West where they failed to reach the playoffs with a 1–2 record.

Team Skrlik reached the playoffs in two of their first three events during the 2022–23 season but did not advance past the quarterfinal round. The team played in the 2022 Tour Challenge Tier 2 slam event where they lost in a tiebreaker to Kristy Watling. At the 2022 Curlers Corner Autumn Gold Curling Classic, Team Skrlik qualified undefeated through the A side before immediately losing in the quarters to Jennifer Jones. At the Ladies Alberta Open, they lost their opening match before winning six straight games en route to claiming their first tour title, defeating the Casey Scheidegger rink in the final. In the new year, the team competed in the 2023 Alberta Scotties Tournament of Hearts, which they qualified for through their Excel Points ranking. Team Skrlik was dominant through the round robin, going a perfect 7–0 which included wins over Casey Scheidegger, Kelsey Rocque and Selena Sturmay. This qualified them directly for the provincial final where they faced Team Scheidegger. The game went back and forth, with Skrlik making a highlight reel double takeout in the tenth end to score two and win the game 9–8. With the win, Team Skrlik represented Alberta at the 2023 Scotties Tournament of Hearts where they missed the playoffs with a 4–4 record. At the Hearts, the team made history, claiming to be the first "majority BIPOC" team to play at the Hearts (the Skrliks are half Japanese, and Tran is half Vietnamese). They again ended their season at the Best of the West where they lost in the semifinals to Kelsey Rocque, skipping the Beth Peterson rink.

During the 2024–25 season, Tran moved to Saskatchewan and Skrlik added Margot Flemming as third to their team. In their first year together, the Skrlik rink won the 2025 Alberta Women's Curling Championship against Nicky Kaufman, where they would go on to represent Alberta at the 2025 Scotties Tournament of Hearts. At the 2025 Scotties, the team went 6–2 in the round robin, and then lost to Nova Scotia's Christina Black 8–7 in the 3v4 game, finishing 4th. The team also had a successful year on the Tour, finishing second at the 2024 PointsBet Invitational, and winning the Martensville International. This success qualified them for their first Tier 1 Grand Slam of Curling event at the 2025 Masters, where they finished with a 1–3 record.

== Personal life ==
Skrlik's sister Kayla Skrlik is the skip of her team. She attended Mount Royal University for chemistry. Skrlik is half Japanese. She currently works as an optometric assistant at Eye Q Optometry.

== Teams ==
Season	Skip	Third	Second	Lead
2013–14	Kayla Skrlik	Cheyanne Richards	Ashton Skrlik	Ashlyn Wozny
2014–15	Kayla Skrlik	Carley Wolfe	Ashton Skrlik	Morgan Krassman
2015–16	Kayla Skrlik	Carley Wolfe	Ashton Skrlik	Morgan Krassman
2016–17	Kayla Skrlik	Carley Wolfe	Ashton Skrlik	Megan Johnson
2017–18	Kayla Skrlik	Ashton Skrlik	Hope Sunley	Megan Johnson
2018–19	Kayla Skrlik	Ashton Skrlik	Hope Sunley	Brenna Bilassy
2019–20	Ryleigh Bakker	Ashton Skrlik	Lisa Parent	Julianna Mackenzie
2020–21	Kayla Skrlik	Selena Sturmay	Brittany Tran	Ashton Skrlik
2021–22	Kayla Skrlik	Geri-Lynn Ramsay	Brittany Tran	Ashton Skrlik
2022–23	Kayla Skrlik	Brittany Tran	Geri-Lynn Ramsay	Ashton Skrlik
2023–24	Kayla Skrlik	Brittany Tran	Geri-Lynn Ramsay	Ashton Skrlik
2024–25	Kayla Skrlik	Margot Flemming	Ashton Skrlik	Geri-Lynn Ramsay
2025–26	Kayla Skrlik	Margot Flemming	Ashton Skrlik	Geri-Lynn Ramsay
