= Brittany Tran =

Canadian curler (born 1993)

- Curler
- Born: Brittany Tran; March 8, 1993 (age 33); Red Deer, Alberta

Team
- Curling club: Garrison CC, Calgary, AB

Curling career
- Member Association: Alberta (2003–2018; 2019–2021; 2022–2024); Northwest Territories (2018–2019); Manitoba (2021); Saskatchewan (2024–2025); British Columbia (2025–present)
- Hearts: 3 (2019, 2021, 2023)
- Top CTRS ranking: 7th (2025–26)
Medal record
Curling
Representing Alberta
Canadian Mixed Doubles Championship
Bronze medal – third place	2023 Sudbury
Canada Winter Games
Silver medal – second place	2011 Halifax

Brittany Tran (born March 8, 1993) is a Canadian curler from Calgary, Alberta.

== Career ==
=== Juniors ===
As a junior, Tran played third for Team Jocelyn Peterman, playing with her since 2003. They represented Alberta at the 2011 Canada Winter Games, where they won a silver medal. In 2012, the team won the Alberta junior championships and represented Alberta at the 2012 Canadian Junior Curling Championships, which they won. They represented Canada at the 2012 World Junior Curling Championships, losing in a tiebreaker.

The next season, the team played in the 2012 Curlers Corner Autumn Gold Curling Classic, their first women's Grand Slam event, where they won just one game. The team could not defend their Canadian Junior title, as they lost in a tiebreaker in the 2013 Alberta junior championship. The team remained together for their final junior season in 2013–14. They played in the 2013 Curlers Corner Autumn Gold Curling Classic, losing all of their games. Later in the year, they lost to Team Kelsey Rocque in the Alberta junior championship.

=== Women's ===
In 2014, the Peterman rink went their separate ways when their junior careers ended. Tran joined up Team Casey Scheidegger, playing lead for the team for the 2014–15 season. On the World Curling Tour, they would win the Medicine Hat Charity Classic, and went 3–3 at the 2014 Curlers Corner Autumn Gold Curling Classic. Later in the year they played in the 2015 Alberta Scotties Tournament of Hearts, Tran's first women's provincial championship. There, the team finished fourth, losing in the page 3 vs. 4 game to Chelsea Carey.

In 2015, Tran joined the Geri-Lynn Ramsay rink, initially playing third for the team, but being moved to second between 2016 and 2018. The team played in the 2017 and 2018 Alberta Scotties Tournament of Hearts, losing in the page 3 vs. 4 game in 2017 (against Scheidegger) and failing to make the playoffs in 2018.

In 2018, the Ramsay rink split up, and Tran joined Team Kerry Galusha out of the Northwest Territories. The team won the Royal LePage Women's Fall Classic tour event that season, and easily won the 2019 Northwest Territories Scotties Tournament of Hearts. Representing the Northwest Territories, Team Galusha finished the preliminary round of the 2019 Scotties Tournament of Hearts, Canada's national women's curling championship with a 3–4 record. After just one season, Tran moved back to Alberta and joined the Kayla Skrlik rink at second. The team won two events on the tour, the Medicine Hat Charity Classic and The Good Times Bonspiel. They also represented Canada at the 2019 Changan Ford International Curling Elite, finishing with a 2–5 record. At the 2020 Alberta Scotties Tournament of Hearts, Team Skrlik finished in fifth place with a 2–5 record.

Due to the COVID-19 pandemic in Canada, many provinces had to cancel their provincial championships, with member associations selecting their representatives for the 2021 Scotties Tournament of Hearts. Due to this situation, Curling Canada added three Wild Card teams to the national championship, which were based on the CTRS standings from the 2019–20 season. Team Beth Peterson qualified for the Scotties as the third Wild Card team, however their lead Melissa Gordon opted to not attend the Scotties due to work commitments. Tran replaced Gordon at the Scotties after getting a call from Team Peterson's alternate and coach Cathy Overton-Clapham to join the team. At the Tournament of Hearts, they finished with a respectable 7–5 fifth place finish.

Following the abbreviated season, Geri-Lynn Ramsay joined Team Skrlik as their new third. Tran continued at second while Ashton Skrlik played lead. The team was able to find immediate success by reaching the semifinals of the Alberta Curling Series: Leduc event. They also made the semifinals of the Ladies Alberta Open and were finalists at the Alberta Curling Series: Thistle event to Germany's Daniela Jentsch. In December 2021, they qualified for the 2022 Alberta Scotties Tournament of Hearts by defeating Lindsay Bertsch in the final qualifier. At provincials, the team finished in last place with a 1–6 record. Back on the tour, they reached the final of the Alberta Curling Tour Championship where they lost to Abby Marks. Team Skrlik rounded out their season at the 2022 Best of the West where they failed to reach the playoffs with a 1–2 record.

Team Skrlik reached the playoffs in two of their first three events during the 2022–23 season but did not advance past the quarterfinal round. The team played in the 2022 Tour Challenge Tier 2 slam event where they lost in a tiebreaker to Kristy Watling. At the 2022 Curlers Corner Autumn Gold Curling Classic, Team Skrlik qualified undefeated through the A side before immediately losing in the quarters to Jennifer Jones. At the Ladies Alberta Open, they lost their opening match before winning six straight games en route to claiming their first tour title, defeating the Casey Scheidegger rink in the final. In the new year, the team competed in the 2023 Alberta Scotties Tournament of Hearts, which they qualified for through their Excel Points ranking. Team Skrlik was dominant through the round robin, going a perfect 7–0 which included wins over Casey Scheidegger, Kelsey Rocque and Selena Sturmay. This qualified them directly for the provincial final where they faced Team Scheidegger. The game went back and forth, with Skrlik making a highlight reel double takeout in the tenth end to score two and win the game 9–8. With the win, Team Skrlik represented Alberta at the 2023 Scotties Tournament of Hearts where they missed the playoffs with a 4–4 record. At the Hearts, the team made history as the first "majority BIPOC" team to play at the Hearts (the Skrliks are half Japanese, and Tran is half Vietnamese). They again ended their season at the Best of the West where they lost in the semifinals to Kelsey Rocque, skipping the Beth Peterson rink.

Tran joined the Ashley Thevenot rink out of Saskatchewan for the 2024–25 season. In their first season together, the team found immediate success, winning the Icebreaker Challenge, as well as the Nutana SaskTour Women's Spiel. However, they would fail to win the Saskatchewan provincial title at the 2025 Viterra Prairie Pinnacle, losing in the semifinals 15–8 to Nancy Martin. At the end of the season, Tran would announce that she would be leaving Saskatchewan to join the new Team Kayla MacMillan rink out of BC alongside Lindsay Dubue as second, Sarah Loken as lead, and Lauren Lenentine as the alternate.

Team MacMillan started the 2025–26 curling season with winning the 2025 Icebreaker Challenge and qualifying for the 2025 Canadian Olympic Curling Pre-Trials. At the Pre-Trials, Team MacMillan would have a good week, but would finish in second place, losing to Selena Sturmay 2 games to 1 in the best-of-three final for the sole spot at the Canadian Olympic Trails.

=== Mixed doubles ===
In 2020, Tran and her mixed doubles partner Aaron Sluchinski won the 2020 Alberta Mixed Doubles Curling Championship, however did not get to compete in the 2020 Canadian Mixed Doubles Curling Championship as it was cancelled due to the COVID-19 pandemic in Canada. As the 2021 Alberta provincial playdowns were cancelled due to the COVID-19 pandemic in Alberta, Tran and Sluchinski were selected to represent Alberta at the 2021 Canadian Mixed Doubles Curling Championship in Calgary. At the championship, the pair finished the round robin with a 4–2 record, qualifying for the championship round as the eleventh seed. They then faced eventual champions Kerri Einarson and Brad Gushue in the round of 12 where they lost 9–8, eliminating them from contention. In 2023, Tran and Sluchinski qualified for the 2023 Canadian Mixed Doubles Curling Championship through ranking points. The team had a strong showing again at the event, going 5–2 in the round robin to qualify for the playoffs again as the eleventh seeds. There, they knocked off Laurie St-Georges and Félix Asselin in a qualification game and then beat Laura Walker and Kirk Muyres in the quarterfinals. They could not continue their run in the semifinals, however, losing in an extra end to Jocelyn Peterman and Brett Gallant.

For the 2024-25 curling season, Tran joined Rylan Kleiter and the pair had a strong start to the season, qualifying for the 2025 Canadian Mixed Doubles Curling Olympic Trials by defeating Lisa Weagle and John Epping 6-3 in the final of the first Direct-Entry Qualifier event. At the Canadian Mixed Doubles Trials, they would finish in 4th place, losing 8-3 in the 3v4 game to Rachel Homan and Brendan Bottcher.

== Personal life ==
Tran was born and raised in Red Deer, Alberta. She is of half-Vietnamese descent. She started curling when she was six.

Tran is employed as a corporate environmental specialist with the City of Calgary.
