= Geri-Lynn Ramsay =

Canadian curler

- Curler
- Born: October 26, 1988 (age 38); Summerside, Prince Edward Island

Team
- Curling club: The Glencoe Club, Calgary, AB
- Skip: Danielle Inglis
- Third: Jo-Ann Rizzo
- Second: Geri-Lynn Ramsay
- Lead: Joanne Tarvit

Curling career
- Member Association: Prince Edward Island (2007–2011); Alberta (2011–2026); Ontario (2026–present)
- Hearts: 4 (2010, 2023, 2025, 2026)
- Top CTRS ranking: 3rd (2024–25)
Medal record
Women's curling
Representing Prince Edward Island
Scotties Tournament of Hearts
Silver medal – second place	2010 Sault Ste. Marie

Geri-Lynn Ramsay (born October 26, 1988, in Summerside, Prince Edward Island) is a Canadian curler from Calgary, Alberta. She currently plays second on Team Danielle Inglis. A native of the town of Summerside, Ramsay entered the national scene in 2010 after forming a rink with longtime junior teammate Erin Carmody and veteran curlers Kathy O'Rourke and Tricia Affleck that captured the 2010 provincial championships at the senior level. At the 2010 Scotties Tournament of Hearts, the squad made it all the way to the final, but lost in the last match to three-time tournament champion Jennifer Jones.

== Career ==
=== 2007–2009 ===
In 2007 when her rink, consisting of Erin Carmody as skip, herself as third, Lisa Moerike as second and Jessica van Ouwerkerk as lead stone, captured the 2007 provincial junior curling championships with a perfect 7–0 record. They then advanced to the 2007 Canadian Junior Curling Championships, where they finished eighth out of thirteen teams. The squad took the provincial junior championships for a second time in 2008 and repeated their feat of a perfect record, before placing ninth out of thirteen at the 2008 Canadian Junior Curling Championships. Later that year the rink took the 2008 Codiac Curling Maritime Junior Bonspiel in the Under-21 category. In 2009 Moerike was replaced with Darcee Birch, and the team won the provincial junior championship for the third consecutive time. The squad had their best national finish at the 2009 Canadian Junior Curling Championships when they placed fourth, narrowly missing a spot in the semifinals.

=== 2009–2011 ===
In 2009 Carmody and Ramsay received a call from veteran curlers Kathy O'Rourke and Tricia Affleck, who decided to join forces with the younger players under a team skipped by O'Rourke, but with Carmody throwing the skip rocks and O'Rourke throwing second. Ramsay would throw third and Affleck would take the lead position. The squad found quick success by winning the 2010 Prince Edward Island Scotties Tournament of Hearts, which earned them the right to represent Prince Edward Island at the 2010 Scotties Tournament of Hearts. There they finished 8–3 in the round robin and eventually advanced to the final, where they lost against Jennifer Jones, who represented Team Canada as the competition's previous winner.

=== 2011–2012 ===
For the 2011-2012 curling season Ramsay, along with Erin Carmody, played with Calgary skip Crystal Webster. Webster was looking for new teammates, as her third Lori Olson-Johns switched rinks to curl with Cheryl Bernard, and during the 2011 Scotties Tournament of Hearts, while sitting as an alternate for Shannon Kleibrink, asked Ramsay and Carmody to join her squad.

=== 2021–Present ===
Ramsay returned to national-level curling when she joined up with the Kayla Skrlik team as third, alongside Brittany Tran as second and Ashton Skrlik as lead for the 2021–22 curling season. Ramsay and Tran switched positions for the 2022-23 season, where Skrlik won their first provincial championship at the 2023 Alberta Scotties Tournament of Hearts, beating Casey Scheidegger 9–8 in the final. This win qualified the rink for their first national championship in the 2023 Scotties Tournament of Hearts, where they finished sixth in Pool A with a 4–4 record.

During the 2024–25 season, Tran moved to Saskatchewan and Skrlik added Margot Flemming as third to their team. In their first year together, the Skrlik rink won the 2025 Alberta Women's Curling Championship against Nicky Kaufman, and would go on to represent Alberta at the 2025 Scotties Tournament of Hearts. At the 2025 Scotties, the team went 6–2 in the round robin, and then lost to Nova Scotia's Christina Black 8–7 in the 3v4 game, finishing 4th. The team also had a successful year on the Tour, finishing second at the 2024 PointsBet Invitational, and winning the Martensville International. This success qualified them for their first Tier 1 Grand Slam of Curling event at the 2025 Masters, where they finished with a 1–3 record.

== Personal life ==
Ramsay works as a server for Vintage Chophouse.
