= 2023 National =

Grand Slam of Curling event

2023 KIOTI National
- Host city: Westville Road, Nova Scotia
- Arena: Pictou County Wellness Centre
- Dates: November 7–12
- Men's winner: (Italy) Team Retornaz
- Curling club: Trentino Curling, Cembra
- Skip: Joël Retornaz
- Third: Amos Mosaner
- Second: Sebastiano Arman
- Lead: Mattia Giovanella
- Coach: Ryan Fry
- Finalist: (Sweden) Niklas Edin
- Women's winner: (South Korea) Team Gim
- Curling club: Uijeongbu CC, Uijeongbu
- Skip: Gim Eun-ji
- Third: Kim Min-ji
- Second: Kim Su-ji
- Lead: Seol Ye-eun
- Alternate: Seol Ye-ji
- Coach: Shin Dong-ho & Guy Hemmings
- Finalist: (Ontario) Rachel Homan

The 2023 KIOTI National was held from November 7 to 12 at the Pictou County Wellness Centre in Westville Road, Nova Scotia. It was the second Grand Slam event and first major of the 2023–24 curling season.

In the men's final, Italy's Joël Retornaz team continued their strong season by defeating the Niklas Edin rink from Sweden, 6–5. It was their second straight Slam victory, and third ever.

In the women's final, South Korea's Gim Eun-ji rink continued their strong play from the 2023 Pan Continental Curling Championships the week prior, defeating the previously undefeated Rachel Homan rink from Ontario 7–6 in the championship game. It was Gim's first Slam title, and the first Slam title for a South Korean team at the Tier 1 level.

== Qualification ==
The top 16 ranked men's and women's teams on the World Curling Federation's world team rankings as of October 9, 2023 qualified for the event. The Grand Slam of Curling may fill one spot in each division as a sponsor's exemption. In the event that a team declines their invitation, the next-ranked team on the world team ranking is invited until the field is complete.

=== Men ===
Top world team ranking men's teams:

1. (Scotland) Bruce Mouat
2. (Alberta) Brendan Bottcher
3. (Newfoundland and Labrador) Brad Gushue
4. (Italy) Joël Retornaz
5. (Sweden) Niklas Edin
6. (Manitoba) Matt Dunstone
7. (Switzerland) Yannick Schwaller
8. (Scotland) Ross Whyte
9. (Alberta) Kevin Koe
10. (United States) Korey Dropkin
11. (Norway) ~~Magnus Ramsfjell~~
12. (Manitoba) Reid Carruthers
13. (Alberta) Aaron Sluchinski
14. (United States) John Shuster
15. (Netherlands) ~~Wouter Gösgens~~
16. (Scotland) James Craik
17. (Japan) Riku Yanagisawa

Sponsor's exemption:

- (Nova Scotia) Owen Purcell

=== Women ===
Top world team ranking women's teams:

1. (Switzerland) Silvana Tirinzoni
2. (Manitoba) Kerri Einarson
3. (Ontario) Rachel Homan
4. (South Korea) Gim Eun-ji
5. (Japan) Satsuki Fujisawa
6. (Manitoba) Jennifer Jones
7. (Sweden) Isabella Wranå
8. (Sweden) Anna Hasselborg
9. (United States) Tabitha Peterson
10. (Manitoba) Kate Cameron
11. (Manitoba) Kaitlyn Lawes
12. (Norway) ~~Marianne Rørvik~~
13. (British Columbia) Clancy Grandy
14. (South Korea) Ha Seung-youn
15. (Scotland) ~~Rebecca Morrison~~
16. (Nova Scotia) Christina Black
17. (Italy) Stefania Constantini
18. (United States) Delaney Strouse

== Men ==
=== Teams ===
The teams are listed as follows:

Skip	Third	Second	Lead	Locale
Brendan Bottcher	Marc Kennedy	Brett Gallant	Ben Hebert	Calgary, Alberta
Reid Carruthers	Brad Jacobs	Derek Samagalski	Connor Njegovan	Winnipeg, Manitoba
James Craik	Mark Watt	Angus Bryce	Blair Haswell	Forfar, Scotland
Korey Dropkin (Fourth)	Andrew Stopera (Skip)	Mark Fenner	Thomas Howell	(United States) Duluth, Minnesota
Matt Dunstone	B. J. Neufeld	Colton Lott	Ryan Harnden	Winnipeg, Manitoba
Niklas Edin	Oskar Eriksson	Rasmus Wranå	Christoffer Sundgren	Karlstad, Sweden
Brad Gushue	Mark Nichols	E. J. Harnden	Geoff Walker	St. John's, Newfoundland and Labrador
Kevin Koe	Tyler Tardi	Jacques Gauthier	Karrick Martin	Calgary, Alberta
Bruce Mouat	Grant Hardie	Bobby Lammie	Hammy McMillan Jr.	Stirling, Scotland
Owen Purcell	Ryan Abraham	Scott Saccary	Adam McEachren	Halifax, Nova Scotia
Joël Retornaz	Amos Mosaner	Sebastiano Arman	Mattia Giovanella	Trentino, Italy
Benoît Schwarz-van Berkel (Fourth)	Yannick Schwaller (Skip)	Sven Michel	Pablo Lachat	Geneva, Switzerland
John Shuster	Chris Plys	Colin Hufman	– (Note: Team Shuster played with three players.)	(United States) Duluth, Minnesota
Aaron Sluchinski	Jeremy Harty	Kerr Drummond	Dylan Webster	Airdrie, Alberta
Ross Whyte	Robin Brydone	Duncan McFadzean	Euan Kyle	Stirling, Scotland
Riku Yanagisawa	Tsuyoshi Yamaguchi	Takeru Yamamoto	Satoshi Koizumi	Karuizawa, Japan

=== Round robin standings ===
Final Round Robin Standings

Key
Teams to Playoffs

Pool A	W	L	PF	PA	SO
(Sweden) Niklas Edin	3	1	20	16	3
(Alberta) Brendan Bottcher	3	1	20	9	4
(Alberta) Aaron Sluchinski	2	2	20	24	12
(Nova Scotia) Owen Purcell	1	3	19	24	14

Pool D	W	L	PF	PA	SO
(Scotland) Ross Whyte	3	1	20	16	10
(Newfoundland and Labrador) Brad Gushue	2	2	18	14	13
(Manitoba) Matt Dunstone	2	2	23	22	15
(United States) John Shuster	0	4	12	27	16

Pool B	W	L	PF	PA	SO
(Switzerland) Yannick Schwaller	3	1	25	24	1
(Scotland) Bruce Mouat	2	2	21	17	2
(United States) Team Dropkin	2	2	19	25	9
(Japan) Riku Yanagisawa	1	3	17	26	6

Pool C	W	L	PF	PA	SO
(Italy) Joël Retornaz	4	0	24	13	7
(Scotland) James Craik	2	2	26	21	5
(Alberta) Kevin Koe	2	2	26	23	11
(Manitoba) Reid Carruthers	0	4	16	25	8

=== Round robin results ===
All draw times are listed in Atlantic Time (UTC−04:00).

==== Draw 1 ====
Tuesday, November 7, 8:00 am

Sheet A	1	2	3	4	5	6	7	8	Final
(Scotland) Bruce Mouat 🔨	3	1	0	0	1	1	0	X	6
(Scotland) James Craik	0	0	1	1	0	0	2	X	4

Sheet B	1	2	3	4	5	6	7	8	Final
(Alberta) Kevin Koe	0	2	0	1	1	0	2	0	6
(United States) Team Dropkin 🔨	2	0	2	0	0	2	0	1	7

Sheet C	1	2	3	4	5	6	7	8	Final
(Switzerland) Yannick Schwaller	0	2	0	2	0	2	0	1	7
(Manitoba) Reid Carruthers 🔨	2	0	1	0	1	0	1	0	5

Sheet D	1	2	3	4	5	6	7	8	Final
(Italy) Joël Retornaz 🔨	3	0	0	2	0	2	0	X	7
(Japan) Riku Yanagisawa	0	2	0	0	1	0	1	X	4

==== Draw 3 ====
Tuesday, November 7, 3:00 pm

Sheet A	1	2	3	4	5	6	7	8	Final
(Newfoundland and Labrador) Brad Gushue 🔨	1	0	2	0	3	0	X	X	6
(Nova Scotia) Owen Purcell	0	1	0	1	0	1	X	X	3

Sheet B	1	2	3	4	5	6	7	8	Final
(Sweden) Niklas Edin 🔨	0	2	0	1	0	2	0	X	5
(Scotland) Ross Whyte	0	0	0	0	1	0	1	X	2

Sheet C	1	2	3	4	5	6	7	8	Final
(Manitoba) Matt Dunstone 🔨	2	0	2	0	2	0	0	X	6
(Alberta) Aaron Sluchinski	0	2	0	3	0	2	1	X	8

Sheet D	1	2	3	4	5	6	7	8	Final
(Alberta) Brendan Bottcher 🔨	0	4	0	0	4	X	X	X	8
(United States) John Shuster	0	0	0	1	0	X	X	X	1

==== Draw 6 ====
Wednesday, November 8, 12:00 pm

Sheet A	1	2	3	4	5	6	7	8	Final
(Alberta) Kevin Koe 🔨	1	0	1	0	1	1	1	2	7
(Japan) Riku Yanagisawa	0	1	0	2	0	0	0	0	3

Sheet B	1	2	3	4	5	6	7	8	9	Final
(Switzerland) Yannick Schwaller	0	2	0	1	1	0	2	0	1	7
(Scotland) James Craik 🔨	2	0	1	0	0	0	0	3	0	6

Sheet C	1	2	3	4	5	6	7	8	Final
(Italy) Joël Retornaz 🔨	2	0	0	2	0	0	2	X	6
(United States) Team Dropkin	0	1	0	0	2	0	0	X	3

Sheet D	1	2	3	4	5	6	7	8	Final
(Scotland) Bruce Mouat	2	1	0	4	0	X	X	X	7
(Manitoba) Reid Carruthers 🔨	0	0	1	0	1	X	X	X	2

==== Draw 8 ====
Wednesday, November 8, 8:00 pm

Sheet A	1	2	3	4	5	6	7	8	Final
(Alberta) Brendan Bottcher 🔨	0	3	0	1	0	3	X	X	7
(Manitoba) Matt Dunstone	0	0	1	0	1	0	X	X	2

Sheet B	1	2	3	4	5	6	7	8	Final
(Alberta) Aaron Sluchinski	0	0	0	1	0	1	2	2	6
(United States) John Shuster 🔨	0	1	0	0	3	0	0	0	4

Sheet C	1	2	3	4	5	6	7	8	Final
(Newfoundland and Labrador) Brad Gushue 🔨	1	0	0	1	0	1	0	X	3
(Sweden) Niklas Edin	0	1	0	0	2	0	3	X	6

Sheet D	1	2	3	4	5	6	7	8	Final
(Scotland) Ross Whyte	0	2	0	2	0	1	1	1	7
(Nova Scotia) Owen Purcell 🔨	2	0	2	0	1	0	0	0	5

==== Draw 10 ====
Thursday, November 9, 12:00 pm

Sheet A	1	2	3	4	5	6	7	8	Final
(Scotland) Ross Whyte	0	2	0	0	0	4	0	1	7
(Alberta) Aaron Sluchinski 🔨	1	0	1	0	0	0	2	0	4

Sheet B	1	2	3	4	5	6	7	8	Final
(Scotland) Bruce Mouat 🔨	0	1	0	0	1	0	0	0	2
(Italy) Joël Retornaz	0	0	1	0	0	2	0	1	4

Sheet C	1	2	3	4	5	6	7	8	Final
(United States) John Shuster	0	0	0	0	0	2	X	X	2
(Nova Scotia) Owen Purcell 🔨	3	1	1	1	1	0	X	X	7

Sheet D	1	2	3	4	5	6	7	8	Final
(Sweden) Niklas Edin 🔨	0	1	0	1	0	1	0	X	3
(Manitoba) Matt Dunstone	0	0	1	0	2	0	3	X	6

==== Draw 12 ====
Thursday, November 9, 8:00 pm

Sheet A	1	2	3	4	5	6	7	8	9	Final
(Manitoba) Reid Carruthers	0	1	1	0	1	0	0	1	0	4
(United States) Team Dropkin 🔨	0	0	0	3	0	1	0	0	1	5

Sheet B	1	2	3	4	5	6	7	8	Final
(Alberta) Brendan Bottcher 🔨	0	0	0	2	0	0	0	1	3
(Newfoundland and Labrador) Brad Gushue	0	0	0	0	1	0	1	0	2

Sheet C	1	2	3	4	5	6	7	8	Final
(Scotland) James Craik 🔨	3	0	2	0	1	1	0	X	7
(Japan) Riku Yanagisawa	0	1	0	3	0	0	0	X	4

Sheet D	1	2	3	4	5	6	7	8	Final
(Switzerland) Yannick Schwaller 🔨	2	0	0	1	0	1	0	3	7
(Alberta) Kevin Koe	0	2	0	0	1	0	3	0	6

==== Draw 13 ====
Friday, November 10, 8:30 am

Sheet A	1	2	3	4	5	6	7	8	Final
(Sweden) Niklas Edin 🔨	0	0	3	0	0	2	0	1	6
(United States) John Shuster	0	1	0	2	0	0	2	0	5

Sheet B	1	2	3	4	5	6	7	8	Final
(Manitoba) Matt Dunstone	0	0	2	2	0	3	2	X	9
(Nova Scotia) Owen Purcell 🔨	0	2	0	0	2	0	0	X	4

Sheet C	1	2	3	4	5	6	7	8	Final
(Alberta) Brendan Bottcher	1	0	0	1	0	0	0	0	2
(Scotland) Ross Whyte 🔨	0	0	1	0	0	0	0	3	4

Sheet D	1	2	3	4	5	6	7	8	Final
(Newfoundland and Labrador) Brad Gushue 🔨	0	0	2	0	3	2	X	X	7
(Alberta) Aaron Sluchinski	0	1	0	1	0	0	X	X	2

==== Draw 15 ====
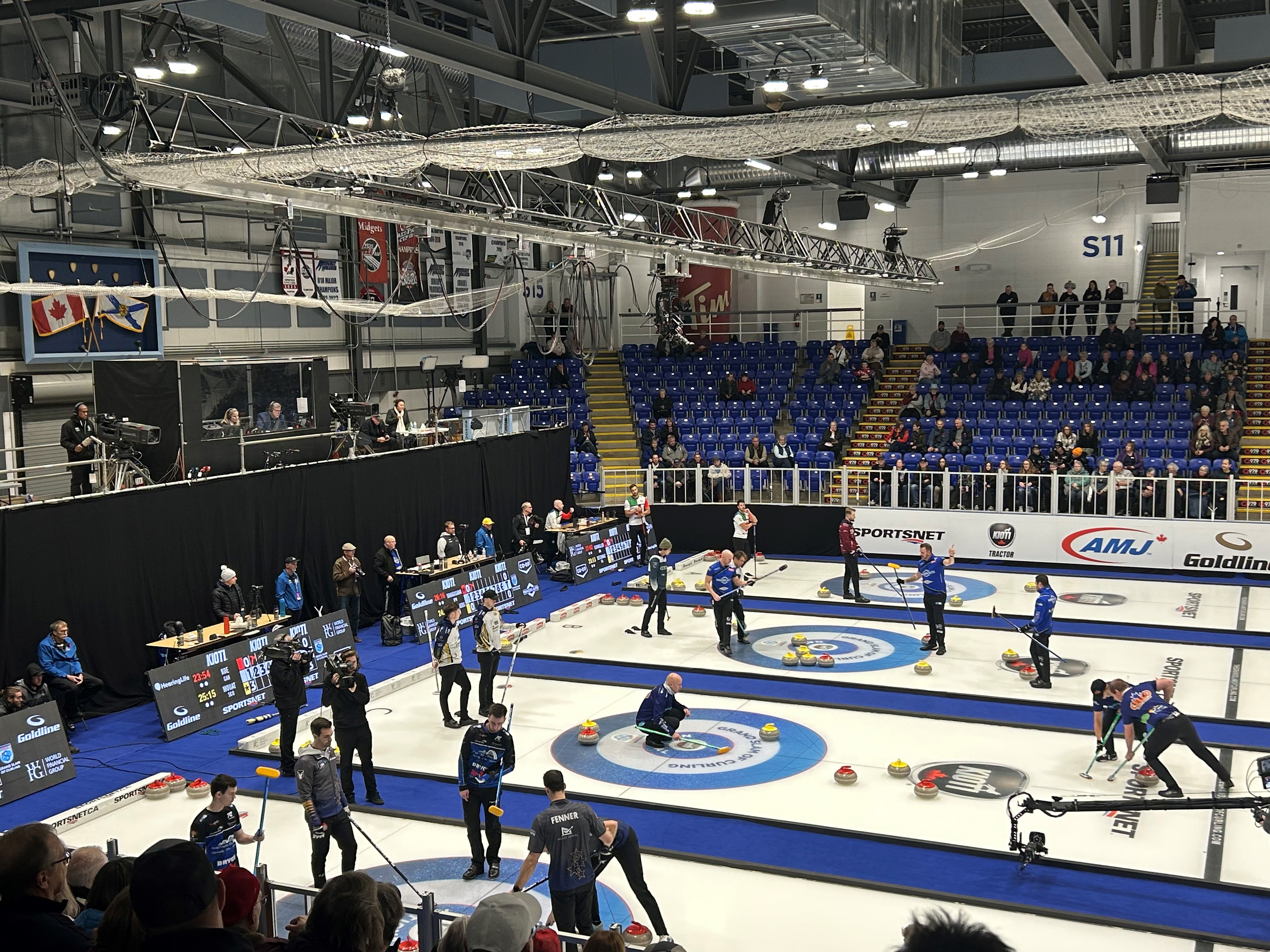
Draw 15 action

Friday, November 10, 4:00 pm

Sheet A	1	2	3	4	5	6	7	8	Final
(Switzerland) Yannick Schwaller 🔨	0	2	0	1	0	1	0	X	4
(Italy) Joël Retornaz	0	0	1	0	2	0	4	X	7

Sheet B	1	2	3	4	5	6	7	8	9	Final
(Japan) Riku Yanagisawa 🔨	0	0	2	0	0	2	1	0	1	6
(Manitoba) Reid Carruthers	0	1	0	2	1	0	0	1	0	5

Sheet C	1	2	3	4	5	6	7	8	9	Final
(Alberta) Kevin Koe	0	2	0	1	0	2	1	0	1	7
(Scotland) Bruce Mouat 🔨	3	0	1	0	1	0	0	1	0	6

Sheet D	1	2	3	4	5	6	7	8	Final
(Scotland) James Craik 🔨	3	0	0	0	1	0	2	3	9
(United States) Team Dropkin	0	1	1	1	0	1	0	0	4

=== Playoffs ===
Quarterfinals
1	(Italy) Joël Retornaz	10
8	(United States) Team Dropkin	3
4	(Alberta) Brendan Bottcher	5
5	(Scotland) Ross Whyte	4
2	(Switzerland) Yannick Schwaller	6
7	(Scotland) James Craik	5
3	(Sweden) Niklas Edin	5
6	(Scotland) Bruce Mouat	4

Semifinals
1	(Italy) Joël Retornaz	6
4	(Alberta) Brendan Bottcher	5
2	(Switzerland) Yannick Schwaller	5
3	(Sweden) Niklas Edin	6

Final
1	(Italy) Joël Retornaz	6
3	(Sweden) Niklas Edin	5

==== Quarterfinals ====
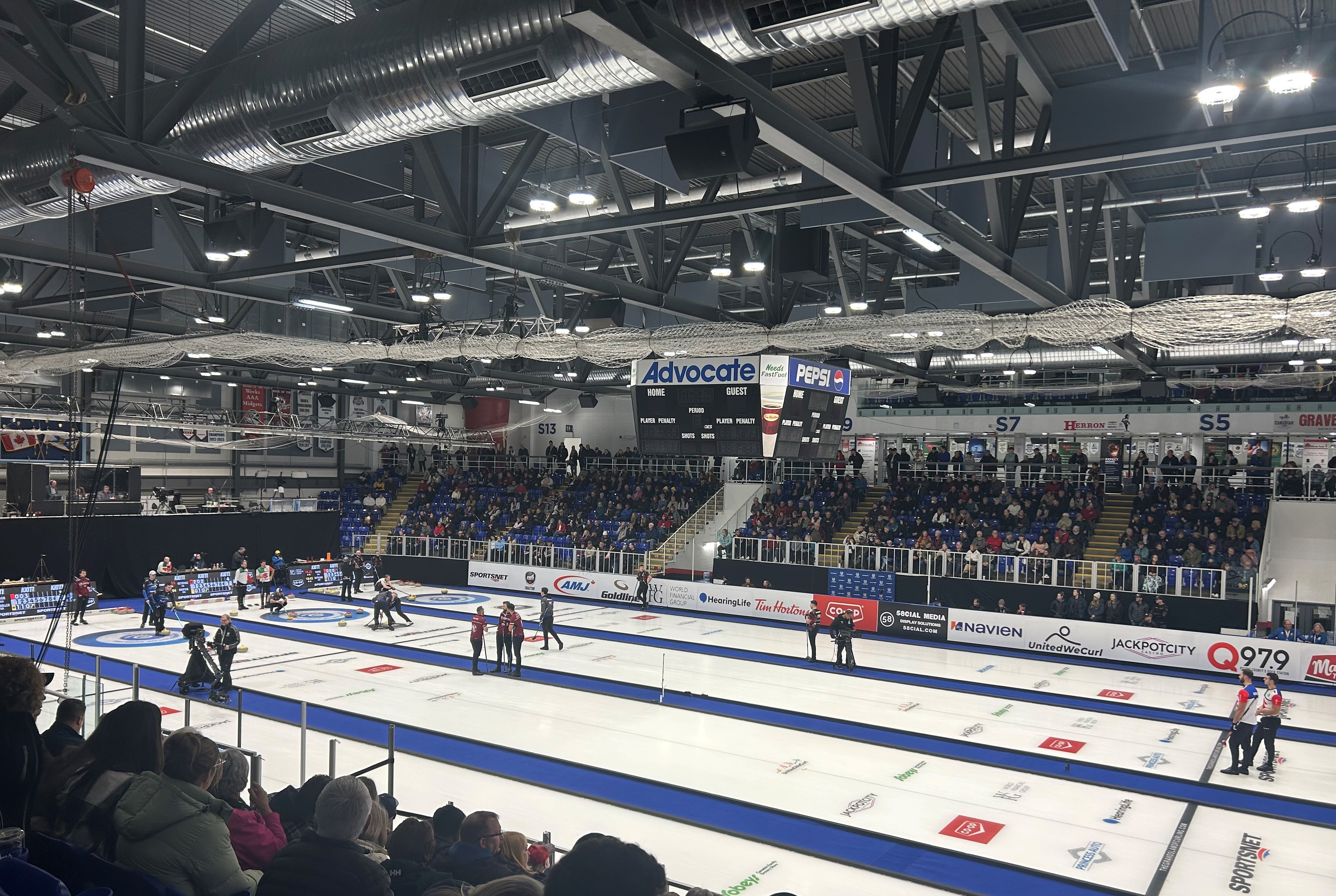
Men's quarterfinal action

Saturday, November 11, 12:00 pm

Sheet A	1	2	3	4	5	6	7	8	9	Final
(Alberta) Brendan Bottcher 🔨	1	1	0	0	1	0	0	1	1	5
(Scotland) Ross Whyte	0	0	0	1	0	2	1	0	0	4

Player percentages
(Alberta) Team Bottcher		(Scotland) Team Whyte	
Ben Hebert	96%	Euan Kyle	96%
Brett Gallant	96%	Duncan McFadzean	88%
Marc Kennedy	81%	Robin Brydone	92%
Brendan Bottcher	83%	Ross Whyte	85%
Total	89%	Total	90%

Sheet B	1	2	3	4	5	6	7	8	Final
(Italy) Joël Retornaz 🔨	2	0	2	2	0	4	X	X	10
(United States) Team Dropkin	0	1	0	0	2	0	X	X	3

Player percentages
(Italy) Team Retornaz		(United States) Team Dropkin	
Mattia Giovanella	100%	Thomas Howell	96%
Sebastiano Arman	88%	Mark Fenner	67%
Amos Mosaner	96%	Andrew Stopera	77%
Joël Retornaz	81%	Korey Dropkin	77%
Total	91%	Total	79%

Sheet C	1	2	3	4	5	6	7	8	Final
(Switzerland) Yannick Schwaller 🔨	1	1	0	2	0	0	2	0	6
(Scotland) James Craik	0	0	3	0	0	1	0	1	5

Player percentages
(Switzerland) Team Schwaller		(Scotland) Team Craik	
Pablo Lachat	94%	Blair Haswell	94%
Sven Michel	95%	Angus Bryce	80%
Yannick Schwaller	88%	Mark Watt	73%
Benoît Schwarz-van Berkel	84%	James Craik	61%
Total	90%	Total	77%

Sheet D	1	2	3	4	5	6	7	8	Final
(Sweden) Niklas Edin 🔨	1	0	2	1	0	0	0	1	5
(Scotland) Bruce Mouat	1	2	0	0	0	2	0	0	4

Player percentages
(Sweden) Team Edin		(Scotland) Team Mouat	
Christoffer Sundgren	95%	Hammy McMillan Jr.	98%
Rasmus Wranå	70%	Bobby Lammie	94%
Oskar Eriksson	77%	Grant Hardie	75%
Niklas Edin	88%	Bruce Mouat	81%
Total	82%	Total	87%

==== Semifinals ====
Saturday, November 11, 8:00 pm

Sheet B	1	2	3	4	5	6	7	8	Final
(Switzerland) Yannick Schwaller	1	0	0	0	2	0	2	0	5
(Sweden) Niklas Edin 🔨	0	2	0	1	0	2	0	1	6

Player percentages
(Switzerland) Team Schwaller		(Sweden) Team Edin	
Pablo Lachat	81%	Christoffer Sundgren	95%
Sven Michel	84%	Rasmus Wranå	88%
Yannick Schwaller	92%	Oskar Eriksson	91%
Benoît Schwarz-van Berkel	86%	Niklas Edin	89%
Total	86%	Total	91%

Sheet C	1	2	3	4	5	6	7	8	Final
(Italy) Joël Retornaz 🔨	2	0	1	0	0	2	0	1	6
(Alberta) Brendan Bottcher	0	2	0	2	0	0	1	0	5

Player percentages
(Italy) Team Retornaz		(Alberta) Team Bottcher	
Mattia Giovanella	97%	Ben Hebert	91%
Sebastiano Arman	97%	Brett Gallant	86%
Amos Mosaner	95%	Marc Kennedy	80%
Joël Retornaz	92%	Brendan Bottcher	88%
Total	95%	Total	86%

==== Final ====
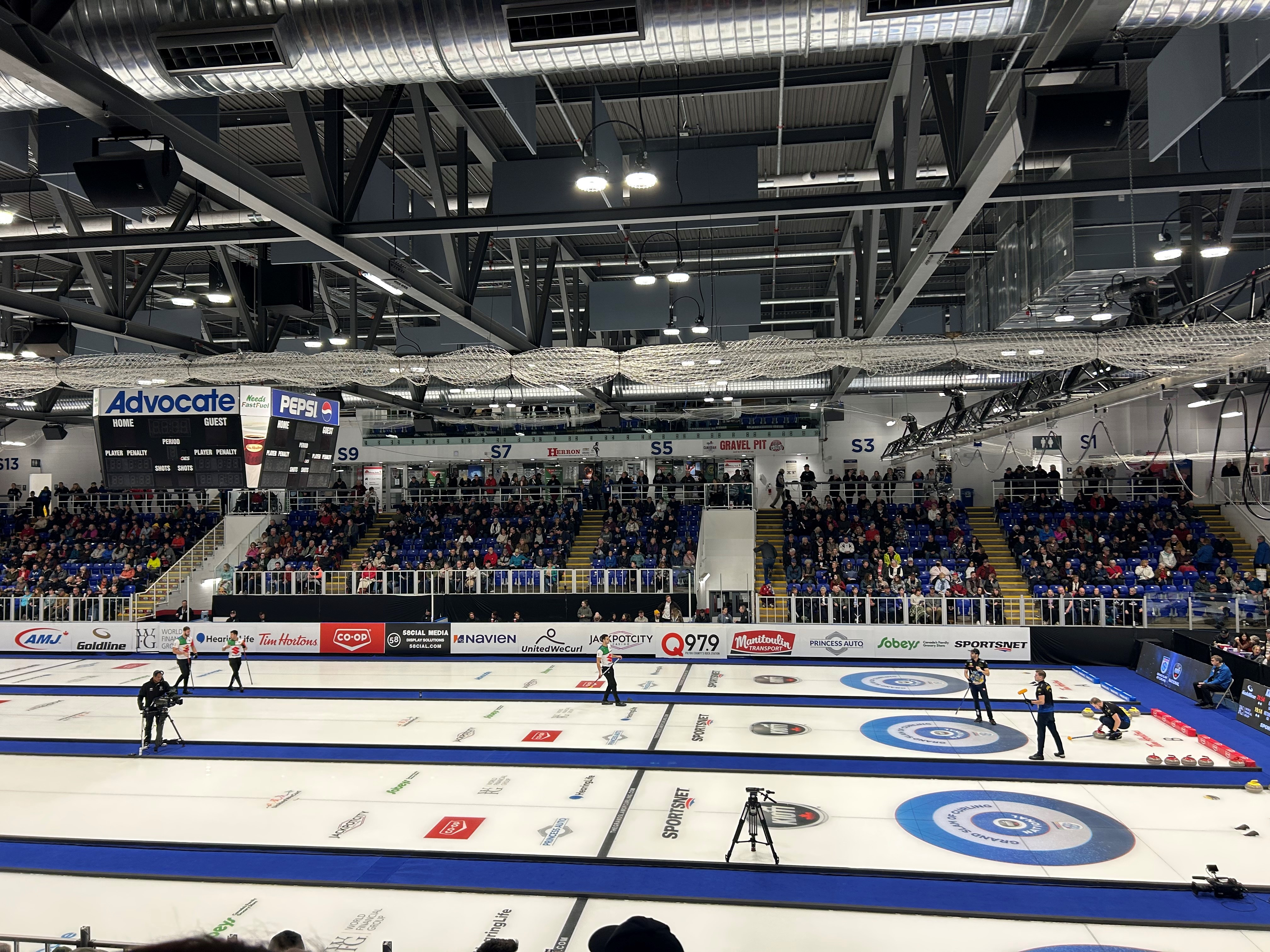
Men's final action

Sunday, November 12, 11:00 am

Sheet B	1	2	3	4	5	6	7	8	Final
(Italy) Joël Retornaz 🔨	0	0	2	1	1	2	0	0	6
(Sweden) Niklas Edin	0	2	0	0	0	0	2	1	5

Player percentages
(Italy) Team Retornaz		(Sweden) Team Edin	
Mattia Giovanella	86%	Christoffer Sundgren	97%
Sebastiano Arman	97%	Rasmus Wranå	81%
Amos Mosaner	88%	Oskar Eriksson	84%
Joël Retornaz	88%	Niklas Edin	72%
Total	89%	Total	84%

== Women ==
=== Teams ===
The teams are listed as follows:

Skip	Third	Second	Lead	Alternate	Locale
Christina Black	Jenn Baxter	Karlee Everist	Shelley Barker		Dartmouth, Nova Scotia
Kate Cameron	Meghan Walter	Taylor McDonald	Mackenzie Elias		Winnipeg, Manitoba
Stefania Constantini	Elena Mathis	Marta Lo Deserto	Giulia Zardini Lacedelli	Angela Romei	Cortina d'Ampezzo, Italy
Kerri Einarson	Val Sweeting	Shannon Birchard	Briane Harris		Gimli, Manitoba
Satsuki Fujisawa	Chinami Yoshida	Yumi Suzuki	Yurika Yoshida	Kotomi Ishizaki	Kitami, Japan
Gim Eun-ji	Kim Min-ji	Kim Su-ji	Seol Ye-eun	Seol Ye-ji	Uijeongbu, South Korea
Clancy Grandy	Kayla MacMillan	Lindsay Dubue	Sarah Loken	Rachelle Brown	Vancouver, British Columbia
Ha Seung-youn	Kim Hye-rin	Yang Tae-i	Kim Su-jin		Chuncheon, South Korea
Anna Hasselborg	Sara McManus	Agnes Knochenhauer	Sofia Mabergs		Sundbyberg, Sweden
Rachel Homan	Tracy Fleury	Emma Miskew	Sarah Wilkes		Ottawa, Ontario
Jennifer Jones	Karlee Burgess	Emily Zacharias	Lauren Lenentine		Winnipeg, Manitoba
Kaitlyn Lawes	Selena Njegovan	Jocelyn Peterman	Kristin MacCuish		Winnipeg, Manitoba
Tabitha Peterson	Cory Thiesse	Tara Peterson	Becca Hamilton		(United States) St. Paul, Minnesota
Delaney Strouse	Anne O'Hara	Sydney Mullaney	Rebecca Rodgers	Susan Dudt	(United States) Traverse City, Michigan
Alina Pätz (Fourth)	Silvana Tirinzoni (Skip)	Selina Witschonke	Carole Howald		Aarau, Switzerland
Isabella Wranå	Almida de Val	Maria Larsson	Linda Stenlund		Sundbyberg, Sweden

=== Round robin standings ===
Final Round Robin Standings

Key
Teams to Playoffs

Pool A	W	L	PF	PA	SO
(Switzerland) Silvana Tirinzoni	2	2	22	21	1
(Italy) Stefania Constantini	2	2	16	21	2
(Japan) Satsuki Fujisawa	2	2	26	19	13
(United States) Delaney Strouse	0	4	20	35	10

Pool D	W	L	PF	PA	SO
(South Korea) Gim Eun-ji	4	0	28	14	12
(Manitoba) Jennifer Jones	4	0	30	15	14
(British Columbia) Clancy Grandy	1	3	23	27	8
(United States) Tabitha Peterson	1	3	15	28	9

Pool B	W	L	PF	PA	SO
(Sweden) Anna Hasselborg	3	1	24	16	7
(Manitoba) Kerri Einarson	2	2	20	18	3
(Manitoba) Kate Cameron	1	3	19	26	11
(Nova Scotia) Christina Black	1	3	14	26	15

Pool C	W	L	PF	PA	SO
(Ontario) Rachel Homan	4	0	27	12	4
(Sweden) Isabella Wranå	3	1	25	22	6
(South Korea) Ha Seung-youn	1	3	14	22	5
(Manitoba) Kaitlyn Lawes	1	3	20	21	16

=== Round robin results ===
All draw times are listed in Atlantic Time (UTC−04:00).

==== Draw 2 ====
Tuesday, November 7, 11:30 am

Sheet A	1	2	3	4	5	6	7	8	Final
(Sweden) Isabella Wranå 🔨	0	1	1	0	1	0	2	4	9
(Nova Scotia) Christina Black	0	0	0	1	0	1	0	0	2

Sheet B	1	2	3	4	5	6	7	8	9	Final
(Sweden) Anna Hasselborg	0	0	1	0	0	2	0	1	1	5
(South Korea) Ha Seung-youn 🔨	0	0	0	2	1	0	1	0	0	4

Sheet C	1	2	3	4	5	6	7	8	Final
(Ontario) Rachel Homan	2	0	2	0	2	1	0	X	7
(Manitoba) Kate Cameron 🔨	0	2	0	1	0	0	2	X	5

Sheet D	1	2	3	4	5	6	7	8	Final
(Manitoba) Kerri Einarson 🔨	0	2	0	1	0	1	2	X	6
(Manitoba) Kaitlyn Lawes	1	0	1	0	2	0	0	X	4

==== Draw 4 ====
Tuesday, November 7, 6:30 pm

Sheet A	1	2	3	4	5	6	7	8	Final
(South Korea) Gim Eun-ji	2	0	2	4	0	4	X	X	12
(United States) Delaney Strouse 🔨	0	2	0	0	2	0	X	X	4

Sheet B	1	2	3	4	5	6	7	8	Final
(Japan) Satsuki Fujisawa	0	3	1	5	2	X	X	X	11
(United States) Tabitha Peterson 🔨	1	0	0	0	0	X	X	X	1

Sheet C	1	2	3	4	5	6	7	8	Final
(Manitoba) Jennifer Jones	2	1	0	1	0	3	3	X	10
(Italy) Stefania Constantini 🔨	0	0	2	0	1	0	0	X	3

Sheet D	1	2	3	4	5	6	7	8	Final
(Switzerland) Silvana Tirinzoni	2	0	1	0	2	0	0	1	6
(British Columbia) Clancy Grandy 🔨	0	1	0	1	0	1	1	0	4

==== Draw 5 ====
Wednesday, November 8, 8:30 am

Sheet A	1	2	3	4	5	6	7	8	Final
(Manitoba) Kerri Einarson 🔨	0	1	3	0	3	X	X	X	7
(South Korea) Ha Seung-youn	0	0	0	1	0	X	X	X	1

Sheet B	1	2	3	4	5	6	7	8	9	Final
(Sweden) Isabella Wranå	2	0	2	0	1	0	1	0	1	7
(Manitoba) Kate Cameron 🔨	0	3	0	1	0	1	0	1	0	6

Sheet C	1	2	3	4	5	6	7	8	Final
(Sweden) Anna Hasselborg 🔨	0	0	1	0	1	2	1	1	6
(Manitoba) Kaitlyn Lawes	0	0	0	3	0	0	0	0	3

Sheet D	1	2	3	4	5	6	7	8	Final
(Ontario) Rachel Homan 🔨	0	3	0	1	1	2	X	X	7
(Nova Scotia) Christina Black	0	0	1	0	0	0	X	X	1

==== Draw 7 ====
Wednesday, November 8, 4:00 pm

Sheet A	1	2	3	4	5	6	7	8	Final
(United States) Tabitha Peterson	0	1	0	1	0	0	0	0	2
(Italy) Stefania Constantini 🔨	0	0	2	0	2	0	1	1	6

Sheet B	1	2	3	4	5	6	7	8	Final
(Switzerland) Silvana Tirinzoni 🔨	0	1	0	1	1	0	2	0	5
(South Korea) Gim Eun-ji	0	0	2	0	0	2	0	2	6

Sheet C	1	2	3	4	5	6	7	8	9	Final
(British Columbia) Clancy Grandy 🔨	2	2	0	2	0	0	1	0	1	8
(United States) Delaney Strouse	0	0	3	0	2	1	0	1	0	7

Sheet D	1	2	3	4	5	6	7	8	Final
(Japan) Satsuki Fujisawa 🔨	1	0	1	0	1	0	0	0	3
(Manitoba) Jennifer Jones	0	2	0	2	0	0	1	1	6

==== Draw 9 ====
Thursday, November 9, 8:30 am

Sheet A	1	2	3	4	5	6	7	8	9	Final
(Japan) Satsuki Fujisawa 🔨	1	1	0	2	0	2	0	0	2	8
(British Columbia) Clancy Grandy	0	0	1	0	3	0	1	1	0	6

Sheet B	1	2	3	4	5	6	7	8	Final
(Manitoba) Jennifer Jones	3	0	2	0	2	1	0	X	8
(United States) Delaney Strouse 🔨	0	2	0	2	0	0	1	X	5

Sheet C	1	2	3	4	5	6	7	8	9	Final
(Switzerland) Silvana Tirinzoni	0	3	0	1	0	1	0	0	2	7
(United States) Tabitha Peterson 🔨	1	0	2	0	1	0	0	1	0	5

Sheet D	1	2	3	4	5	6	7	8	Final
(South Korea) Gim Eun-ji	1	0	0	1	0	1	1	X	4
(Italy) Stefania Constantini 🔨	0	0	0	0	1	0	0	X	1

==== Draw 11 ====
Thursday, November 9, 4:00 pm

Sheet A	1	2	3	4	5	6	7	8	Final
(Manitoba) Kaitlyn Lawes	0	0	1	0	0	2	1	0	4
(Manitoba) Kate Cameron 🔨	1	0	0	2	1	0	0	2	6

Sheet B	1	2	3	4	5	6	7	8	Final
(Manitoba) Kerri Einarson	0	2	0	0	0	X	X	X	2
(Ontario) Rachel Homan 🔨	2	0	2	0	3	X	X	X	7

Sheet C	1	2	3	4	5	6	7	8	Final
(South Korea) Ha Seung-youn 🔨	0	0	0	1	0	X	X	X	1
(Nova Scotia) Christina Black	1	1	3	0	3	X	X	X	8

Sheet D	1	2	3	4	5	6	7	8	Final
(Sweden) Anna Hasselborg 🔨	3	0	2	0	3	1	X	X	9
(Sweden) Isabella Wranå	0	1	0	2	0	0	X	X	3

==== Draw 14 ====
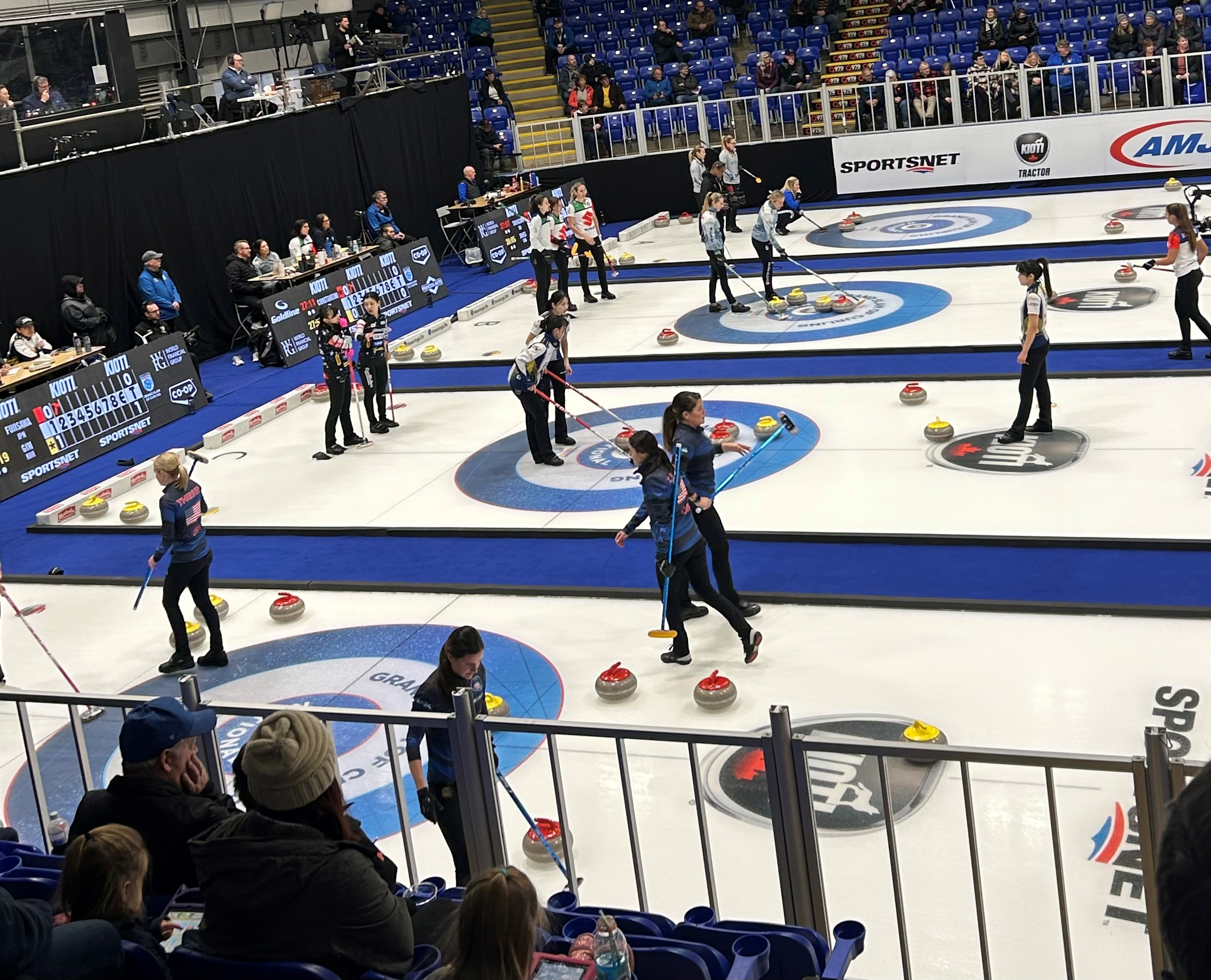
Draw 14 action

Friday, November 10, 12:00 pm

Sheet A	1	2	3	4	5	6	7	8	Final
(Switzerland) Silvana Tirinzoni 🔨	1	0	1	0	1	0	1	0	4
(Manitoba) Jennifer Jones	0	0	0	3	0	1	0	2	6

Sheet B	1	2	3	4	5	6	7	8	9	Final
(Italy) Stefania Constantini 🔨	0	0	1	0	3	0	1	0	1	6
(British Columbia) Clancy Grandy	0	1	0	1	0	2	0	1	0	5

Sheet C	1	2	3	4	5	6	7	8	Final
(South Korea) Gim Eun-ji 🔨	1	0	0	2	0	2	0	1	6
(Japan) Satsuki Fujisawa	0	1	0	0	1	0	2	0	4

Sheet D	1	2	3	4	5	6	7	8	Final
(United States) Tabitha Peterson 🔨	2	1	2	1	0	0	0	1	7
(United States) Delaney Strouse	0	0	0	0	1	2	1	0	4

==== Draw 16 ====
Friday, November 10, 8:00 pm

Sheet A	1	2	3	4	5	6	7	8	Final
(Ontario) Rachel Homan 🔨	2	0	0	2	0	1	1	X	6
(Sweden) Anna Hasselborg	0	0	2	0	2	0	0	X	4

Sheet B	1	2	3	4	5	6	7	8	Final
(Manitoba) Kaitlyn Lawes 🔨	3	0	4	2	0	X	X	X	9
(Nova Scotia) Christina Black	0	1	0	0	2	X	X	X	3

Sheet C	1	2	3	4	5	6	7	8	Final
(Manitoba) Kerri Einarson 🔨	1	0	0	0	2	1	0	1	5
(Sweden) Isabella Wranå	0	2	1	1	0	0	2	0	6

Sheet D	1	2	3	4	5	6	7	8	Final
(Manitoba) Kate Cameron	0	0	0	1	1	0	0	X	2
(South Korea) Ha Seung-youn 🔨	1	1	3	0	0	2	1	X	8

=== Playoffs ===
Quarterfinals
1	(Ontario) Rachel Homan	7
8	(Manitoba) Kerri Einarson	4
4	(Sweden) Isabella Wranå	4
5	(Sweden) Anna Hasselborg	8
2	(South Korea) Gim Eun-ji	9
7	(Italy) Stefania Constantini	3
3	(Manitoba) Jennifer Jones	4
6	(Switzerland) Silvana Tirinzoni	11

Semifinals
1	(Ontario) Rachel Homan	9
5	(Sweden) Anna Hasselborg	6
2	(South Korea) Gim Eun-ji	7
6	(Switzerland) Silvana Tirinzoni	3

Final
1	(Ontario) Rachel Homan	6
2	(South Korea) Gim Eun-ji	7

==== Quarterfinals ====
Saturday, November 11, 4:00 pm

Sheet A	1	2	3	4	5	6	7	8	Final
(South Korea) Gim Eun-ji 🔨	2	0	0	4	0	2	1	X	9
(Italy) Stefania Constantini	0	1	1	0	1	0	0	X	3

Player percentages
(South Korea) Team Gim		(Italy) Team Constantini	
Seol Ye-eun	84%	Giulia Zardini Lacedelli	80%
Kim Su-ji	79%	Marta Lo Deserto	73%
Kim Min-ji	80%	Elena Mathis	66%
Gim Eun-ji	89%	Stefania Constantini	57%
Total	83%	Total	69%

Sheet B	1	2	3	4	5	6	7	8	Final
(Sweden) Isabella Wranå 🔨	0	0	2	0	2	0	0	X	4
(Sweden) Anna Hasselborg	1	3	0	2	0	2	0	X	8

Player percentages
(Sweden) Team Wranå		(Sweden) Team Hasselborg	
Linda Stenlund	83%	Sofia Mabergs	90%
Maria Larsson	80%	Agnes Knochenhauer	87%
Almida de Val	88%	Sara McManus	88%
Isabella Wranå	68%	Anna Hasselborg	83%
Total	80%	Total	87%

Sheet C	1	2	3	4	5	6	7	8	Final
(Manitoba) Jennifer Jones 🔨	1	0	2	0	1	0	X	X	4
(Switzerland) Silvana Tirinzoni	0	5	0	2	0	4	X	X	11

Player percentages
(Manitoba) Team Jones		(Switzerland) Team Tirinzoni	
Lauren Lenentine	88%	Carole Howald	98%
Emily Zacharias	85%	Selina Witschonke	100%
Karlee Burgess	75%	Silvana Tirinzoni	98%
Jennifer Jones	85%	Alina Pätz	100%
Total	83%	Total	99%

Sheet D	1	2	3	4	5	6	7	8	Final
(Ontario) Rachel Homan 🔨	2	1	0	2	0	0	2	X	7
(Manitoba) Kerri Einarson	0	0	1	0	2	1	0	X	4

Player percentages
(Ontario) Team Homan		(Manitoba) Team Einarson	
Sarah Wilkes	88%	Briane Harris	98%
Emma Miskew	98%	Shannon Birchard	94%
Tracy Fleury	92%	Val Sweeting	80%
Rachel Homan	97%	Kerri Einarson	84%
Total	94%	Total	89%

==== Semifinals ====
Saturday, November 11, 8:00 pm

Sheet A	1	2	3	4	5	6	7	8	Final
(Ontario) Rachel Homan 🔨	2	0	3	0	2	0	2	X	9
(Sweden) Anna Hasselborg	0	2	0	2	0	2	0	X	6

Player percentages
(Ontario) Team Homan		(Sweden) Team Hasselborg	
Sarah Wilkes	89%	Sofia Mabergs	97%
Emma Miskew	80%	Agnes Knochenhauer	89%
Tracy Fleury	77%	Sara McManus	78%
Rachel Homan	83%	Anna Hasselborg	75%
Total	82%	Total	85%

Sheet D	1	2	3	4	5	6	7	8	Final
(South Korea) Gim Eun-ji 🔨	3	0	3	0	1	0	X	X	7
(Switzerland) Silvana Tirinzoni	0	1	0	1	0	1	X	X	3

Player percentages
(South Korea) Team Gim		(Switzerland) Team Tirinzoni	
Seol Ye-eun	75%	Carole Howald	88%
Kim Su-ji	96%	Selina Witschonke	88%
Kim Min-ji	73%	Silvana Tirinzoni	71%
Gim Eun-ji	89%	Alina Pätz	69%
Total	83%	Total	79%

==== Final ====
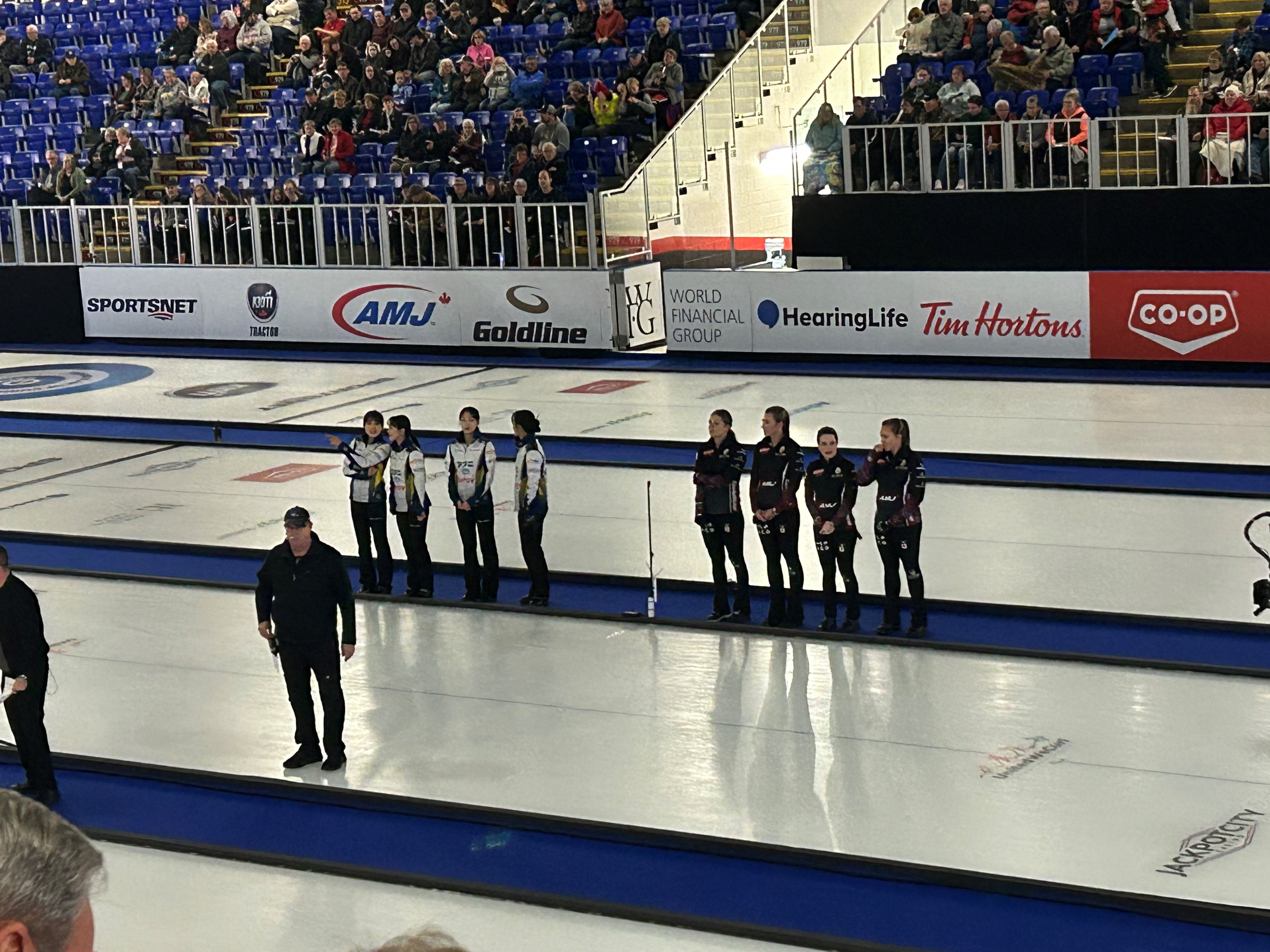
Introductions prior to the women's final

Sunday, November 12, 3:30 pm

Sheet B	1	2	3	4	5	6	7	8	Final
(Ontario) Rachel Homan	0	1	1	0	2	0	2	0	6
(South Korea) Gim Eun-ji 🔨	2	0	0	2	0	2	0	1	7

Player percentages
(Ontario) Team Homan		(South Korea) Team Gim	
Sarah Wilkes	84%	Seol Ye-eun	94%
Emma Miskew	84%	Kim Su-ji	91%
Tracy Fleury	77%	Kim Min-ji	81%
Rachel Homan	70%	Gim Eun-ji	78%
Total	79%	Total	86%
