= 2022 Alberta Curling Series: Event 1 =

Curling event in Canada

2022 Curling Stadium Alberta Curling Series: Event 1
- Host city: Leduc, Alberta
- Arena: Leduc Recreation Centre
- Dates: August 26–28
- Men's winner: (Alberta) Team Sluchinski
- Curling club: The Glencoe Club, Calgary
- Skip: Aaron Sluchinski
- Third: Jeremy Harty
- Second: Kerr Drummond
- Lead: Dylan Webster
- Finalist: (Alberta) Karsten Sturmay
- Women's winner: (South Korea) Team Gim
- Curling club: Uijeongbu CC, Uijeongbu
- Skip: Gim Eun-ji
- Third: Kim Min-ji
- Second: Kim Su-ji
- Lead: Seol Ye-eun
- Alternate: Seol Ye-ji
- Finalist: (Alberta) Selena Sturmay

The first event of the 2022 Curling Stadium Alberta Curling Series was held from August 26 to 28 at the Leduc Recreation Centre in Leduc, Alberta. It was the first of five men's and women's events held as part of the Alberta Curling Series for the 2022–23 curling season. The total purse for the event was $6,500 on the men's side and $5,000 on the women's side.

The event was sponsored by Curling Stadium, a streaming service provided by CurlingZone. All of the games were streamed on CurlingZone and the Alberta Curling Series' YouTube page.

== Men ==
=== Teams ===
The teams are listed as follows:

Skip	Third	Second	Lead	Alternate	Locale
Cole Adams	Riley Helston	Benjamin Helston	Braden Pelech		Calgary, Alberta
Guy Algot	Rodney Ouellette	Gryffen Algot	Justin Runciman		Sherwood Park, Alberta
Warren Cross	Tyler Pfiffer	Morgan Van Doesburg	Mike Lambert		Edmonton, Alberta
John Epping	Mat Camm	Pat Janssen	Scott Chadwick		Toronto, Ontario
Kyler Kleibrink	Dustin Kalthoff	Chris Kennedy	Evan van Amsterdam		Calgary, Alberta
Jacob Libbus	Nathan Molberg	Steven Leong	Michael Henricks	Tyler Gritten	Okotoks, Alberta
Ryan Parent	Zachary Pawliuk	Tyler Powell	John Ritchie		Calgary, Alberta
Aaron Sluchinski	Jeremy Harty	Kerr Drummond	Dylan Webster		Calgary, Alberta
Karsten Sturmay	J. D. Lind	Kyle Doering	Glenn Venance	Kurtis Goller	Edmonton, Alberta
Scott Webb	Tristan Steinke	Jordan Steinke	Andrew Dunbar		Sexsmith, Alberta

=== Round-robin standings ===
Final round-robin standings

Key
Teams to Playoffs
Teams to Tiebreaker

Pool A	W	L	PF	PA	DSC
(Alberta) Aaron Sluchinski	3	1	21	16	31.0
(Alberta) Scott Webb	3	1	18	17	212.3
(Alberta) Jacob Libbus	2	2	21	18	236.5
(Ontario) John Epping	2	2	18	20	301.5
(Alberta) Warren Cross	0	4	19	26	257.0

Pool B	W	L	PF	PA	DSC
(Alberta) Karsten Sturmay	4	0	27	11	57.0
(Alberta) Kyler Kleibrink	2	2	23	25	216.0
(Alberta) Ryan Parent	2	2	21	20	303.5
(Alberta) Cole Adams	1	3	14	28	11.5
(Alberta) Guy Algot	1	3	20	21	90.0

=== Round-robin results ===
All draw times are listed in Mountain Time (UTC−06:00).

==== Draw 1 ====
Friday, August 26, 5:00 pm

Sheet 4	1	2	3	4	5	6	7	8	Final
(Alberta) Kyler Kleibrink	0	2	1	0	2	2	0	X	7
(Alberta) Guy Algot	1	0	0	2	0	0	2	X	5

Sheet 5	1	2	3	4	5	6	7	8	Final
(Alberta) Ryan Parent	0	2	0	0	2	5	X	X	9
(Alberta) Cole Adams	1	0	0	1	0	0	X	X	2

Sheet 6	1	2	3	4	5	6	7	8	Final
(Alberta) Aaron Sluchinski	0	0	1	0	0	1	3	2	7
(Alberta) Warren Cross	0	1	0	0	3	0	0	0	4

Sheet 7	1	2	3	4	5	6	7	8	Final
(Alberta) Scott Webb	0	0	2	0	0	2	0	1	5
(Alberta) Jacob Libbus	0	1	0	2	0	0	1	0	4

==== Draw 2 ====
Friday, August 26, 8:00 pm

Sheet 2	1	2	3	4	5	6	7	8	Final
(Alberta) Aaron Sluchinski	0	0	1	1	1	0	X	X	3
(Alberta) Scott Webb	1	4	0	0	0	1	X	X	6

Sheet 4	1	2	3	4	5	6	7	8	Final
(Ontario) John Epping	0	2	0	0	0	1	0	X	3
(Alberta) Jacob Libbus	2	0	0	1	1	0	2	X	6

Sheet 6	1	2	3	4	5	6	7	8	Final
(Alberta) Karsten Sturmay	2	2	0	2	2	X	X	X	8
(Alberta) Cole Adams	0	0	1	0	0	X	X	X	1

Sheet 8	1	2	3	4	5	6	7	8	Final
(Alberta) Kyler Kleibrink	0	0	3	0	1	1	0	X	5
(Alberta) Ryan Parent	1	3	0	3	0	0	2	X	9

==== Draw 3 ====
Saturday, August 27, 10:00 am

Sheet 1	1	2	3	4	5	6	7	8	9	Final
(Alberta) Cole Adams	0	2	0	0	2	0	1	0	1	6
(Alberta) Guy Algot	1	0	0	1	0	1	0	2	0	5

Sheet 3	1	2	3	4	5	6	7	8	Final
(Alberta) Jacob Libbus	0	1	2	0	2	1	0	X	6
(Alberta) Warren Cross	2	0	0	1	0	0	1	X	4

Sheet 5	1	2	3	4	5	6	7	8	Final
(Ontario) John Epping	0	0	3	0	0	1	2	X	6
(Alberta) Scott Webb	0	0	0	1	1	0	0	X	2

Sheet 7	1	2	3	4	5	6	7	8	Final
(Alberta) Karsten Sturmay	2	1	0	0	1	1	0	X	5
(Alberta) Ryan Parent	0	0	1	1	0	0	1	X	3

==== Draw 4 ====
Saturday, August 27, 3:00 pm

Sheet 4	1	2	3	4	5	6	7	8	Final
(Alberta) Ryan Parent	0	0	0	0	0	X	X	X	0
(Alberta) Guy Algot	1	1	1	2	3	X	X	X	8

Sheet 5	1	2	3	4	5	6	7	8	Final
(Alberta) Karsten Sturmay	1	0	1	0	3	0	0	1	6
(Alberta) Kyler Kleibrink	0	1	0	1	0	2	1	0	5

Sheet 6	1	2	3	4	5	6	7	8	9	Final
(Alberta) Scott Webb	2	0	1	0	0	1	0	0	1	5
(Alberta) Warren Cross	0	1	0	0	2	0	0	1	0	4

Sheet 7	1	2	3	4	5	6	7	8	Final
(Ontario) John Epping	0	1	0	0	0	0	X	X	1
(Alberta) Aaron Sluchinski	1	0	0	1	2	1	X	X	5

==== Draw 5 ====
Saturday, August 27, 6:00 pm

Sheet 3	1	2	3	4	5	6	7	8	Final
(Alberta) Karsten Sturmay	5	1	0	2	X	X	X	X	8
(Alberta) Guy Algot	0	0	2	0	X	X	X	X	2

Sheet 5	1	2	3	4	5	6	7	8	9	Final
(Alberta) Aaron Sluchinski	0	1	0	1	0	3	0	0	1	6
(Alberta) Jacob Libbus	0	0	1	0	1	0	2	1	0	5

Sheet 7	1	2	3	4	5	6	7	8	Final
(Alberta) Kyler Kleibrink	2	0	1	1	0	1	0	1	6
(Alberta) Cole Adams	0	2	0	0	2	0	1	0	5

Sheet 8	1	2	3	4	5	6	7	8	9	Final
(Ontario) John Epping	1	0	1	0	0	2	3	0	1	8
(Alberta) Warren Cross	0	1	0	3	1	0	0	2	0	7

=== Tiebreaker ===
Sunday, August 28, 9:00 am

Sheet 4	1	2	3	4	5	6	7	8	Final
(Alberta) Kyler Kleibrink	0	1	0	1	0	0	X	X	2
(Alberta) Jacob Libbus	1	0	3	0	2	1	X	X	7

=== Playoffs ===
Semifinals
1	(Alberta) Karsten Sturmay	5
4	(Alberta) Jacob Libbus	2
2	(Alberta) Aaron Sluchinski	6
3	(Alberta) Scott Webb	1

Final
1	(Alberta) Karsten Sturmay	6
2	(Alberta) Aaron Sluchinski	8

==== Semifinals ====
Sunday, August 28, 12:00 pm

Sheet 4	1	2	3	4	5	6	7	8	Final
(Alberta) Aaron Sluchinski	1	2	1	0	2	X	X	X	6
(Alberta) Scott Webb	0	0	0	1	0	X	X	X	1

Sheet 7	1	2	3	4	5	6	7	8	Final
(Alberta) Karsten Sturmay	0	0	2	0	1	1	0	1	5
(Alberta) Jacob Libbus	0	0	0	1	0	0	1	0	2

==== Final ====
Sunday, August 28, 3:00 pm

Sheet 5	1	2	3	4	5	6	7	8	Final
(Alberta) Karsten Sturmay	0	2	0	1	0	0	3	0	6
(Alberta) Aaron Sluchinski	0	0	2	0	1	1	0	4	8

== Women ==
=== Teams ===
The teams are listed as follows:

Skip	Third	Second	Lead	Alternate	Locale
Lindsay Bertsch	Kelly Erickson	Candace Read	Trina Ball		Edmonton, Alberta
Claire Booth	Kaylee Raniseth	Raelyn Helston	Lauren Miller		Calgary, Alberta
Corryn Brown	Erin Pincott	Dezaray Hawes	Samantha Fisher		Kamloops, British Columbia
Gim Eun-ji	Kim Min-ji	Kim Su-ji	Seol Ye-eun	Seol Ye-ji	Uijeongbu, South Korea
Krysta Hilker	Kim Curtin	Sydney Steinke	Claire Murray		Edmonton, Alberta
Isabelle Ladouceur	Jamie Smith	Grace Lloyd	Rachel Steele		Waterloo, Ontario
Adele Purcell	Deanne Nichol	Meghan Chateauvert	Heather Steele		St. Albert, Alberta
Selena Sturmay	Abby Marks	Kate Goodhelpsen	Paige Papley		Edmonton, Alberta

=== Round-robin standings ===
Final round-robin standings

Key
Teams to Playoffs

Pool A	W	L	PF	PA	DSC
(South Korea) Gim Eun-ji	3	0	22	12	422.0
(Ontario) Isabelle Ladouceur	2	1	16	12	145.0
(Alberta) Adele Purcell	1	2	14	19	206.0
(Alberta) Lindsay Bertsch	0	3	11	20	151.0

Pool B	W	L	PF	PA	DSC
(Alberta) Selena Sturmay	3	0	25	7	81.0
(Alberta) Krysta Hilker	2	1	15	12	134.5
(British Columbia) Corryn Brown	1	2	9	15	100.5
(Alberta) Claire Booth	0	3	9	24	169.5

=== Round-robin results ===
All draw times are listed in Mountain Time (UTC−06:00).

==== Draw 2 ====
Friday, August 26, 8:00 pm

Sheet 1	1	2	3	4	5	6	7	8	Final
(Ontario) Isabelle Ladouceur	0	0	1	0	0	2	2	0	5
(Alberta) Adele Purcell	0	0	0	1	2	0	0	1	4

Sheet 3	1	2	3	4	5	6	7	8	Final
(South Korea) Gim Eun-ji	0	0	0	2	0	3	0	1	6
(Alberta) Lindsay Bertsch	0	1	0	0	3	0	1	0	5

Sheet 5	1	2	3	4	5	6	7	8	Final
(Alberta) Selena Sturmay	0	0	0	1	1	2	1	1	6
(Alberta) Krysta Hilker	1	2	1	0	0	0	0	0	4

Sheet 7	1	2	3	4	5	6	7	8	Final
(British Columbia) Corryn Brown	0	1	0	2	3	0	X	X	6
(Alberta) Claire Booth	0	0	1	0	0	2	X	X	3

==== Draw 3 ====
Saturday, August 27, 10:00 am

Sheet 2	1	2	3	4	5	6	7	8	Final
(British Columbia) Corryn Brown	0	1	0	0	1	0	0	X	2
(Alberta) Krysta Hilker	1	0	2	1	0	0	1	X	5

Sheet 4	1	2	3	4	5	6	7	8	Final
(Alberta) Selena Sturmay	2	3	3	0	4	X	X	X	12
(Alberta) Claire Booth	0	0	0	2	0	X	X	X	2

Sheet 6	1	2	3	4	5	6	7	8	Final
(South Korea) Gim Eun-ji	1	0	3	0	6	X	X	X	10
(Alberta) Adele Purcell	0	1	0	2	0	X	X	X	3

Sheet 8	1	2	3	4	5	6	7	8	Final
(Ontario) Isabelle Ladouceur	3	1	0	1	0	1	1	X	7
(Alberta) Lindsay Bertsch	0	0	1	0	1	0	0	X	2

==== Draw 5 ====
Saturday, August 27, 6:00 pm

Sheet 1	1	2	3	4	5	6	7	8	Final
(Alberta) Claire Booth	0	0	0	0	3	0	1	X	4
(Alberta) Krysta Hilker	0	2	0	2	0	2	0	X	6

Sheet 2	1	2	3	4	5	6	7	8	Final
(Alberta) Adele Purcell	0	1	0	2	0	0	4	X	7
(Alberta) Lindsay Bertsch	1	0	1	0	1	1	0	X	4

Sheet 4	1	2	3	4	5	6	7	8	Final
(South Korea) Gim Eun-ji	0	1	2	0	2	1	0	X	6
(Ontario) Isabelle Ladouceur	1	0	0	1	0	0	2	X	4

Sheet 6	1	2	3	4	5	6	7	8	Final
(Alberta) Selena Sturmay	1	1	1	0	1	3	X	X	7
(British Columbia) Corryn Brown	0	0	0	1	0	0	X	X	1

=== Playoffs ===
Semifinals
1	(Alberta) Selena Sturmay	6
4	(Ontario) Isabelle Ladouceur	3
2	(South Korea) Gim Eun-ji	6
3	(Alberta) Krysta Hilker	1

Final
1	(Alberta) Selena Sturmay	4
2	(South Korea) Gim Eun-ji	7

==== Semifinals ====
Sunday, August 28, 12:00 pm

Sheet 3	1	2	3	4	5	6	7	8	Final
(South Korea) Gim Eun-ji	0	2	3	1	0	X	X	X	6
(Alberta) Krysta Hilker	0	0	0	0	1	X	X	X	1

Sheet 5	1	2	3	4	5	6	7	8	Final
(Alberta) Selena Sturmay	2	0	0	1	1	2	0	X	6
(Ontario) Isabelle Ladouceur	0	1	1	0	0	0	1	X	3

==== Final ====
Sunday, August 28, 3:00 pm

Sheet 6	1	2	3	4	5	6	7	8	Final
(Alberta) Selena Sturmay	0	1	0	2	0	1	0	X	4
(South Korea) Gim Eun-ji	1	0	2	0	3	0	1	X	7
