= 2019 AMJ Campbell Shorty Jenkins Classic =

World Curling Tour event

- Host city: Cornwall, Ontario
- Arena: Cornwall Curling Centre
- Dates: September 10–15
- Men's winner: (Ontario) Team Epping
- Curling club: Leaside CC, East York, Toronto
- Skip: John Epping
- Third: Ryan Fry
- Second: Mat Camm
- Lead: Brent Laing
- Finalist: (Ontario) Brad Jacobs
- Women's winner: (Manitoba) Team Jones
- Curling club: St. Vital CC, Winnipeg
- Skip: Jennifer Jones
- Third: Kaitlyn Lawes
- Second: Jocelyn Peterman
- Lead: Dawn McEwen
- Finalist: (Manitoba) Tracy Fleury

The 2019 AMJ Campbell Shorty Jenkins Classic was held September 10 to 15 in Cornwall, Ontario. The total purse for the event was $59,000 for the Men's and $34,500 for the Women's.

In the Men's final, John Epping defeated Brad Jacobs 5–3 in an all Ontario matchup. In the Women's final, Jennifer Jones defeated Tracy Fleury 6–4 in an all Manitoba affair.

== Men ==
=== Teams ===
The teams are listed as follows:

Skip	Third	Second	Lead	Locale
Steve Allen	Ritchie Gillan	Rick Allen	Kevin Rathwell	Ottawa, Ontario
Brendan Bottcher	Darren Moulding	Brad Thiessen	Karrick Martin	Edmonton, Alberta
Braden Calvert	Kyle Kurz	Ian McMillan	Rob Gordon	Winnipeg, Manitoba
Denis Cordick	James Grattan	Ken McDermot	Doug McDermot	Georgetown, Ontario
Benoît Schwarz (Fourth)	Sven Michel	Peter de Cruz (Skip)	Valentin Tanner	Geneva, Switzerland
Matt Dunstone	Braeden Moskowy	Catlin Schneider	Dustin Kidby	Regina, Saskatchewan
John Epping	Ryan Fry	Mat Camm	Brent Laing	Toronto, Ontario
Martin Ferland	Richard Daneault	Don Bowser	Vincent Bourget	Trois-Rivières, Quebec
Mike Fournier	Félix Asselin	William Dion	Jean-François Trépanier	Montreal, Quebec
Jason Gunnlaugson	Alex Forrest	Adam Casey	Connor Njegovan	Winnipeg, Manitoba
Brad Gushue	Mark Nichols	Brett Gallant	Geoff Walker	St. John's, Newfoundland and Labrador
Glenn Howard	Scott Howard	David Mathers	Tim March	Penetanguishene, Ontario
Brad Jacobs	Marc Kennedy	E. J. Harnden	Ryan Harnden	Sault Ste. Marie, Ontario
Kevin Koe	B. J. Neufeld	Colton Flasch	Ben Hebert	Calgary, Alberta
Yuta Matsumura	Tetsuro Shimizu	Yasumasa Tanida	Kosuke Aita	Kitami, Japan
Scott McDonald	Jonathan Beuk	Wesley Forget	Scott Chadwick	Kingston, Ontario
Reid Carruthers	Daley Peters	Derek Samagalski	Colin Hodgson	Winnipeg, Manitoba
Bruce Mouat	Grant Hardie	Bobby Lammie	Hammy McMillan Jr.	Edinburgh, Scotland
Ross Paterson	Kyle Waddell	Duncan Menzies	Michael Goodfellow	Glasgow, Scotland
Robert Desjardins (Fourth)	Jean-Sébastien Roy (Skip)	Pierre-Luc Morisette	René Dubois	Saguenay, Quebec
Yannick Schwaller	Michael Brunner	Romano Meier	Marcel Käufeler	Bern, Switzerland
Karsten Sturmay	Tristan Steinke	Jason Ginter	Glen Venance	Edmonton, Alberta
Thomas Ulsrud	Steffen Walstad	Markus Høiberg	Magnus Vågberg	Oppdal, Norway
Wouter Gösgens (Fourth)	Jaap van Dorp (Skip)	Laurens Hoekman	Carlo Glasbergen	Zoetermeer, Netherlands

=== Round-robin standings ===
Final round-robin standings

Key
Teams to Playoffs
Teams to Tiebreakers

Pool A	W	L
(Manitoba) Braden Calvert	4	1
(Newfoundland and Labrador) Brad Gushue	3	2
(Alberta) Kevin Koe	3	2
(Ontario) Glenn Howard	2	3
(Norway) Thomas Ulsrud	2	3
(Ontario) Denis Cordick	1	4

Pool B	W	L
(Switzerland) Peter de Cruz	4	1
(Saskatchewan) Matt Dunstone	3	2
(Alberta) Brendan Bottcher	3	2
(Alberta) Karsten Sturmay	2	3
(Quebec) Martin Ferland	2	3
(Manitoba) Jason Gunnlaugson	1	4

Pool C	W	L
(Scotland) Ross Paterson	4	1
(Scotland) Bruce Mouat	3	2
(Netherlands) Jaap van Dorp	3	2
(Manitoba) Team McEwen	2	3
(Japan) Yuta Matsumura	2	3
(Ontario) Steve Allen	1	4

Pool D	W	L
(Ontario) Brad Jacobs	5	0
(Ontario) John Epping	4	1
(Switzerland) Yannick Schwaller	3	2
(Quebec) Mike Fournier	2	3
(Quebec) Jean-Sébastien Roy	1	4
(Ontario) Scott McDonald	0	5

=== Round-robin results ===
All draw times are listed in Eastern Time (UTC−05:00).

==== Draw 1 ====
Tuesday, September 10, 20:00

Sheet 2	1	2	3	4	5	6	7	8	9	Final
(Japan) Yuta Matsumura 🔨	0	2	0	0	2	0	3	1	0	8
(Netherlands) Jaap van Dorp	1	0	2	1	0	4	0	0	1	9

==== Draw 2 ====
Wednesday, September 11, 18:30

Sheet 3	1	2	3	4	5	6	7	8	Final
(Manitoba) Team McEwen 🔨	1	0	0	0	0	1	0	X	2
(Japan) Yuta Matsumura	0	1	1	0	2	0	2	X	6

Sheet 6	1	2	3	4	5	6	7	8	Final
(Scotland) Bruce Mouat	0	3	0	2	0	5	X	X	10
(Ontario) Steve Allen 🔨	1	0	1	0	1	0	X	X	3

==== Draw 3 ====
Wednesday, September 11, 21:00

Sheet 1	1	2	3	4	5	6	7	8	Final
(Switzerland) Peter de Cruz	1	0	3	0	3	1	X	X	8
(Alberta) Karsten Sturmay 🔨	0	1	0	1	0	0	X	X	2

Sheet 4	1	2	3	4	5	6	7	8	Final
(Scotland) Ross Paterson	0	2	0	0	1	1	0	0	4
(Netherlands) Jaap van Dorp 🔨	1	0	1	2	0	0	1	1	6

Sheet 5	1	2	3	4	5	6	7	8	Final
(Ontario) John Epping 🔨	0	1	0	1	0	2	1	0	5
(Switzerland) Yannick Schwaller	0	0	1	0	2	0	0	1	4

==== Draw 4 ====
Thursday, September 12, 08:00

Sheet 1	1	2	3	4	5	6	7	8	Final
(Saskatchewan) Matt Dunstone 🔨	0	0	1	0	1	0	1	X	3
(Manitoba) Jason Gunnlaugson	2	1	0	1	0	1	0	X	5

Sheet 2	1	2	3	4	5	6	7	8	Final
(Alberta) Brendan Bottcher 🔨	0	3	0	2	2	X	X	X	7
(Quebec) Martin Ferland	0	0	1	0	0	X	X	X	1

Sheet 6	1	2	3	4	5	6	7	8	Final
(Quebec) Mike Fournier 🔨	4	1	2	3	X	X	X	X	10
(Quebec) Jean-Sébastien Roy	0	0	0	0	X	X	X	X	0

==== Draw 5 ====
Thursday, September 12, 10:45

Sheet 1	1	2	3	4	5	6	7	8	Final
(Ontario) Brad Jacobs 🔨	3	0	4	X	X	X	X	X	7
(Switzerland) Yannick Schwaller	0	1	0	X	X	X	X	X	1

Sheet 2	1	2	3	4	5	6	7	8	9	Final
(Alberta) Kevin Koe 🔨	2	1	0	1	0	1	0	1	0	6
(Manitoba) Braden Calvert	0	0	1	0	3	0	2	0	1	7

Sheet 4	1	2	3	4	5	6	7	8	Final
(Newfoundland and Labrador) Brad Gushue	0	1	0	0	2	0	0	X	3
(Norway) Thomas Ulsrud 🔨	2	0	2	1	0	0	2	X	7

Sheet 6	1	2	3	4	5	6	7	8	Final
(Scotland) Ross Paterson 🔨	2	0	0	0	1	0	1	2	6
(Japan) Yuta Matsumura	0	0	2	1	0	2	0	0	5

==== Draw 6 ====
Thursday, September 12, 13:30

Sheet 1	1	2	3	4	5	6	7	8	Final
(Ontario) Scott McDonald 🔨	0	1	0	1	0	0	1	X	3
(Quebec) Jean-Sébastien Roy	1	0	2	0	2	1	0	X	6

==== Draw 7 ====
Thursday, September 12, 16:15

Sheet 1	1	2	3	4	5	6	7	8	Final
(Norway) Thomas Ulsrud 🔨	0	2	1	0	0	1	0	0	4
(Manitoba) Braden Calvert	2	0	0	0	2	0	2	1	7

Sheet 2	1	2	3	4	5	6	7	8	Final
(Ontario) John Epping 🔨	1	0	2	0	2	0	2	X	7
(Quebec) Mike Fournier	0	1	0	0	0	1	0	X	2

Sheet 4	1	2	3	4	5	6	7	8	Final
(Alberta) Brendan Bottcher 🔨	0	2	0	0	1	0	2	0	5
(Alberta) Karsten Sturmay	1	0	2	0	0	2	0	1	6

Sheet 5	1	2	3	4	5	6	7	8	Final
(Newfoundland and Labrador) Brad Gushue 🔨	1	0	3	2	0	2	0	X	8
(Ontario) Denis Cordick	0	2	0	0	2	0	1	X	5

Sheet 6	1	2	3	4	5	6	7	8	Final
(Manitoba) Team McEwen 🔨	1	1	0	2	0	0	3	X	7
(Netherlands) Jaap van Dorp	0	0	2	0	1	1	0	X	4

==== Draw 8 ====
Thursday, September 12, 19:00

Sheet 2	1	2	3	4	5	6	7	8	Final
(Scotland) Bruce Mouat	0	1	0	3	0	0	0	X	4
(Scotland) Ross Paterson 🔨	2	0	1	0	1	3	1	X	8

Sheet 5	1	2	3	4	5	6	7	8	Final
(Ontario) Brad Jacobs	0	4	0	0	2	0	2	X	8
(Ontario) Scott McDonald 🔨	1	0	1	1	0	0	0	X	3

==== Draw 9 ====
Thursday, September 12, 21:30

Sheet 1	1	2	3	4	5	6	7	8	Final
(Alberta) Kevin Koe	0	3	0	0	4	X	X	X	7
(Ontario) Glenn Howard 🔨	1	0	0	1	0	X	X	X	2

Sheet 2	1	2	3	4	5	6	7	8	Final
(Switzerland) Peter de Cruz	0	1	1	2	0	1	1	X	6
(Saskatchewan) Matt Dunstone 🔨	1	0	0	0	2	0	0	X	3

Sheet 3	1	2	3	4	5	6	7	8	9	Final
(Manitoba) Jason Gunnlaugson	0	2	1	0	3	0	0	3	0	9
(Quebec) Martin Ferland 🔨	5	0	0	3	0	1	1	0	1	10

Sheet 4	1	2	3	4	5	6	7	8	Final
(Manitoba) Braden Calvert 🔨	0	1	0	1	3	3	X	X	8
(Ontario) Denis Cordick	0	0	2	0	0	0	X	X	2

Sheet 5	1	2	3	4	5	6	7	8	9	Final
(Manitoba) Team McEwen 🔨	1	2	0	0	0	1	0	1	1	6
(Ontario) Steve Allen	0	0	1	1	0	0	3	0	0	5

==== Draw 10 ====
Friday, September 13, 08:00

Sheet 2	1	2	3	4	5	6	7	8	9	Final
(Newfoundland and Labrador) Brad Gushue	0	0	3	0	1	0	2	0	2	8
(Ontario) Glenn Howard 🔨	1	1	0	1	0	2	0	1	0	6

Sheet 3	1	2	3	4	5	6	7	8	Final
(Ontario) Brad Jacobs	1	0	2	0	1	2	X	X	6
(Quebec) Jean-Sébastien Roy 🔨	0	1	0	1	0	0	X	X	2

Sheet 5	1	2	3	4	5	6	7	8	Final
(Scotland) Bruce Mouat 🔨	2	0	2	0	4	0	X	X	8
(Japan) Yuta Matsumura	0	2	0	1	0	1	X	X	4

==== Draw 11 ====
Friday, September 13, 10:45

Sheet 2	1	2	3	4	5	6	7	8	Final
(Ontario) Scott McDonald	0	0	0	0	0	1	X	X	1
(Quebec) Mike Fournier 🔨	1	0	2	3	0	0	X	X	6

Sheet 3	1	2	3	4	5	6	7	8	Final
(Scotland) Ross Paterson 🔨	1	0	0	0	1	1	0	4	7
(Ontario) Steve Allen	0	1	0	2	0	0	2	0	5

Sheet 4	1	2	3	4	5	6	7	8	Final
(Saskatchewan) Matt Dunstone 🔨	1	0	1	1	0	3	0	1	7
(Alberta) Karsten Sturmay	0	1	0	0	2	0	2	0	5

Sheet 5	1	2	3	4	5	6	7	8	Final
(Switzerland) Peter de Cruz	1	0	0	0	1	0	2	3	7
(Quebec) Martin Ferland 🔨	0	1	0	2	0	2	0	0	5

Sheet 6	1	2	3	4	5	6	7	8	Final
(Alberta) Brendan Bottcher	2	0	2	0	1	3	X	X	8
(Manitoba) Jason Gunnlaugson 🔨	0	1	0	0	0	0	X	X	1

==== Draw 12 ====
Friday, September 13, 13:30

Sheet 1	1	2	3	4	5	6	7	8	Final
(Switzerland) Yannick Schwaller 🔨	2	1	0	4	0	X	X	X	7
(Quebec) Jean-Sébastien Roy	0	0	1	0	1	X	X	X	2

Sheet 2	1	2	3	4	5	6	7	8	Final
(Alberta) Kevin Koe 🔨	1	0	2	0	2	0	0	1	6
(Ontario) Denis Cordick	0	3	0	2	0	2	1	0	8

Sheet 3	1	2	3	4	5	6	7	8	Final
(Norway) Thomas Ulsrud 🔨	0	1	0	0	0	3	1	0	5
(Ontario) Glenn Howard	0	0	1	1	2	0	0	2	6

Sheet 4	1	2	3	4	5	6	7	8	Final
(Scotland) Bruce Mouat 🔨	2	0	2	1	0	1	0	X	6
(Manitoba) Team McEwen	0	1	0	0	1	0	1	X	3

==== Draw 13 ====
Friday, September 13, 16:15

Sheet 6	1	2	3	4	5	6	7	8	Final
(Ontario) John Epping	0	1	0	1	0	1	0	X	3
(Ontario) Brad Jacobs 🔨	1	0	1	0	2	0	2	X	6

==== Draw 14 ====
Friday, September 13, 19:00

Sheet 2	1	2	3	4	5	6	7	8	Final
(Netherlands) Jaap van Dorp	0	1	1	1	0	1	0	0	4
(Ontario) Steve Allen 🔨	3	0	0	0	1	0	0	2	6

Sheet 3	1	2	3	4	5	6	7	8	9	Final
(Alberta) Karsten Sturmay	0	0	1	1	0	0	3	1	0	6
(Quebec) Martin Ferland 🔨	0	1	0	0	4	1	0	0	1	7

Sheet 4	1	2	3	4	5	6	7	8	Final
(Switzerland) Yannick Schwaller 🔨	2	0	3	1	1	0	0	1	8
(Ontario) Scott McDonald	0	2	0	0	0	2	2	0	6

Sheet 5	1	2	3	4	5	6	7	8	Final
(Alberta) Kevin Koe	1	0	2	0	5	X	X	X	8
(Norway) Thomas Ulsrud 🔨	0	1	0	2	0	X	X	X	3

Sheet 6	1	2	3	4	5	6	7	8	Final
(Newfoundland and Labrador) Brad Gushue 🔨	0	2	0	0	0	1	0	3	6
(Manitoba) Braden Calvert	0	0	0	1	1	0	3	0	5

==== Draw 15 ====
Friday, September 13, 21:30

Sheet 4	1	2	3	4	5	6	7	8	Final
(Switzerland) Peter de Cruz 🔨	1	0	1	0	1	0	2	1	6
(Manitoba) Jason Gunnlaugson	0	1	0	1	0	2	0	0	4

Sheet 5	1	2	3	4	5	6	7	8	Final
(Alberta) Brendan Bottcher 🔨	0	0	0	0	X	X	X	X	0
(Saskatchewan) Matt Dunstone	0	3	2	2	X	X	X	X	7

==== Draw 16 ====
Saturday, September 14, 08:00

Sheet 1	1	2	3	4	5	6	7	8	Final
(Scotland) Ross Paterson 🔨	3	0	1	0	0	3	X	X	7
(Manitoba) Team McEwen	0	2	0	1	0	0	X	X	4

Sheet 2	1	2	3	4	5	6	7	8	Final
(Ontario) John Epping 🔨	1	0	0	3	0	0	X	X	4
(Ontario) Scott McDonald	0	1	0	0	1	0	X	X	2

Sheet 5	1	2	3	4	5	6	7	8	Final
(Switzerland) Yannick Schwaller 🔨	2	1	0	0	0	0	2	2	7
(Quebec) Mike Fournier	0	0	2	1	0	2	0	0	5

==== Draw 17 ====
Saturday, September 14, 10:45

Sheet 1	1	2	3	4	5	6	7	8	Final
(Norway) Thomas Ulsrud 🔨	1	0	1	0	2	1	0	1	6
(Ontario) Denis Cordick	0	1	0	2	0	0	1	0	4

Sheet 5	1	2	3	4	5	6	7	8	9	Final
(Ontario) Glenn Howard 🔨	0	0	1	0	1	0	0	3	0	5
(Manitoba) Braden Calvert	1	0	0	2	0	0	2	0	1	6

==== Draw 18 ====
Saturday, September 14, 13:30

Sheet 1	1	2	3	4	5	6	7	8	Final
(Manitoba) Jason Gunnlaugson	0	2	0	3	0	0	0	X	5
(Alberta) Karsten Sturmay 🔨	2	0	2	0	1	0	3	X	8

Sheet 3	1	2	3	4	5	6	7	8	Final
(Japan) Yuta Matsumura	0	0	0	1	1	2	1	0	5
(Ontario) Steve Allen 🔨	0	1	1	0	0	0	0	2	4

Sheet 4	1	2	3	4	5	6	7	8	Final
(Scotland) Bruce Mouat 🔨	1	0	0	0	2	0	3	0	6
(Netherlands) Jaap van Dorp	0	1	1	1	0	4	0	2	9

Sheet 5	1	2	3	4	5	6	7	8	Final
(Saskatchewan) Matt Dunstone 🔨	1	2	0	1	0	2	5	X	11
(Quebec) Martin Ferland	0	0	1	0	1	0	0	X	2

Sheet 6	1	2	3	4	5	6	7	8	Final
(Ontario) John Epping	0	1	1	0	2	0	2	X	6
(Quebec) Jean-Sébastien Roy 🔨	1	0	0	2	0	1	0	X	4

==== Draw 19 ====
Saturday, September 14, 16:15

Sheet 2	1	2	3	4	5	6	7	8	Final
(Alberta) Brendan Bottcher 🔨	0	1	0	1	3	1	X	X	6
(Switzerland) Peter de Cruz	0	0	1	0	0	0	X	X	1

Sheet 3	1	2	3	4	5	6	7	8	9	Final
(Alberta) Kevin Koe 🔨	2	0	0	0	2	1	0	0	1	6
(Newfoundland and Labrador) Brad Gushue	0	2	1	1	0	0	0	1	0	5

Sheet 4	1	2	3	4	5	6	7	8	Final
(Ontario) Brad Jacobs 🔨	0	3	1	1	1	0	X	X	6
(Quebec) Mike Fournier	1	0	0	0	0	1	X	X	2

Sheet 6	1	2	3	4	5	6	7	8	Final
(Ontario) Glenn Howard 🔨	3	0	3	0	0	0	3	X	9
(Ontario) Denis Cordick	0	3	0	1	1	1	0	X	6

==== Tiebreakers ====
Saturday, September 14, 19:00

Sheet 1	1	2	3	4	5	6	7	8	Final
(Scotland) Bruce Mouat 🔨	0	0	0	4	0	2	1	X	7
(Netherlands) Jaap van Dorp	0	0	0	0	2	0	0	X	2

Sheet 2	1	2	3	4	5	6	7	8	Final
(Saskatchewan) Matt Dunstone 🔨	0	0	0	1	0	2	0	0	3
(Alberta) Kevin Koe	0	1	0	0	2	0	1	1	5

Sheet 3	1	2	3	4	5	6	7	8	Final
(Switzerland) Yannick Schwaller 🔨	1	0	4	1	0	X	X	X	7
(Alberta) Brendan Bottcher	0	1	0	0	1	X	X	X	2

Saturday, September 14, 21:30

Sheet 6	1	2	3	4	5	6	7	8	Final
(Newfoundland and Labrador) Brad Gushue	1	0	3	1	0	2	X	X	7
(Scotland) Bruce Mouat 🔨	0	1	0	0	1	0	X	X	2

=== Playoffs ===
Quarterfinals
1	(Ontario) Brad Jacobs	6
8	(Alberta) Kevin Koe	2
4	(Manitoba) Braden Calvert	6
5	(Scotland) Ross Paterson	5
2	(Switzerland) Peter de Cruz	5
7	(Switzerland) Yannick Schwaller	2
3	(Ontario) John Epping	7
6	(Newfoundland and Labrador) Brad Gushue	4

Semifinals
1	(Ontario) Brad Jacobs	9
4	(Manitoba) Braden Calvert	5
2	(Switzerland) Peter de Cruz	2
3	(Ontario) John Epping	7

Final
1	(Ontario) Brad Jacobs	3
3	(Ontario) John Epping	5

==== Quarterfinals ====
Sunday, September 15, 09:00

Sheet 1	1	2	3	4	5	6	7	8	Final
(Switzerland) Peter de Cruz 🔨	0	0	2	1	0	2	0	X	5
(Switzerland) Yannick Schwaller	0	0	0	0	1	0	1	X	2

Sheet 3	1	2	3	4	5	6	7	8	Final
(Ontario) Brad Jacobs 🔨	0	1	0	2	0	1	2	X	6
(Alberta) Kevin Koe	0	0	1	0	1	0	0	X	2

Sheet 4	1	2	3	4	5	6	7	8	Final
(Manitoba) Braden Calvert 🔨	1	0	3	0	2	0	0	0	6
(Scotland) Ross Paterson	0	1	0	1	0	2	1	0	5

Sheet 5	1	2	3	4	5	6	7	8	Final
(Ontario) John Epping 🔨	1	0	0	0	3	1	0	2	7
(Newfoundland and Labrador) Brad Gushue	0	0	0	2	0	0	2	0	4

==== Semifinals ====
Sunday, September 15, 12:30

Sheet 2	1	2	3	4	5	6	7	8	Final
(Ontario) Brad Jacobs 🔨	2	1	1	0	3	0	2	X	9
(Manitoba) Braden Calvert	0	0	0	3	0	2	0	X	5

Sheet 4	1	2	3	4	5	6	7	8	Final
(Switzerland) Peter de Cruz 🔨	1	0	0	1	0	0	0	X	2
(Ontario) John Epping	0	2	0	0	1	2	2	X	7

==== Final ====
Sunday, September 15, 15:30

Sheet 5	1	2	3	4	5	6	7	8	Final
(Ontario) Brad Jacobs 🔨	0	1	0	0	1	0	1	0	3
(Ontario) John Epping	1	0	0	3	0	0	0	1	5

== Women ==
=== Teams ===
The teams are listed as follows:

Skip	Third	Second	Lead	Locale
Cathy Auld	Erin Morrissey	Courtney Auld	Cayla Auld	Kingston, Ontario
Suzanne Birt	Marie Christianson	Meaghan Hughes	Michelle McQuaid	Charlottetown, Prince Edward Island
Chrissy Cadorin	Joanne Curtis	Mallory Kean	Laura LaBonte	Thornhill, Ontario
Hollie Duncan	Laura Hickey	Cheryl Kreviazuk	Karen Sagle	Toronto, Ontario
Carole Howald (Fourth)	Michèle Jäggi (Skip)	Stefanie Berset	Larissa Hari	Langenthal, Switzerland
Tracy Fleury	Selena Njegovan	Jill Officer	Kristin MacCuish	East St. Paul, Manitoba
Kerry Galusha	Sarah Koltun	Jo-Ann Rizzo	Shona Barbour	Yellowknife, Northwest Territories
Gim Un-chi	Um Min-ji	Kim Su-ji	Seol Ye-eun	Gyeonggido, South Korea
Jennifer Harvey	Stephanie Barbeau	Lisa Lalonde	Kelly McLeod	Cornwall, Ontario
Anna Hasselborg	Sara McManus	Agnes Knochenhauer	Sofia Mabergs	Sundbyberg, Sweden
Rachel Homan	Emma Miskew	Lindsay Dubue	Lisa Weagle	Ottawa, Ontario
Erica Hopson	Breanna Rozon	Erin Butler	Emma Malfara	Ottawa, Ontario
Danielle Inglis	Jessica Corrado	Stephanie Corrado	Cassandra de Groot	Mississauga, Ontario
Sophie Jackson	Naomi Brown	Mili Smith	Sophie Sinclair	Dumfries, Scotland
Jennifer Jones	Kaitlyn Lawes	Jocelyn Peterman	Dawn McEwen	Winnipeg, Manitoba
Kaitlyn Jones	Allison Flaxey	Clancy Grandy	Morgan Lavell	Toronto, Ontario
Anna Kubešková	Alžběta Baudyšová	Michaela Baudyšová	Ezhen Kolchevskaia	Prague, Czech Republic
Eve Muirhead	Lauren Gray	Jennifer Dodds	Vicky Wright	Stirling, Scotland
Ikue Kitazawa (Fourth)	Chiaki Matsumura	Seina Nakajima (Skip)	Hasumi Ishigooka	Nagano, Japan
Nina Roth	Tabitha Peterson	Becca Hamilton	Aileen Geving	(United States) McFarland, Wisconsin
Jamie Sinclair	Cory Christensen	Vicky Persinger	Sarah Anderson	(United States) Chaska, Minnesota
Briar Hürlimann (Fourth)	Elena Stern (Skip)	Lisa Gisler	Céline Koller	Oberwallis, Switzerland
Alina Pätz (Fourth)	Silvana Tirinzoni (Skip)	Esther Neuenschwander	Melanie Barbezat	Aarau, Switzerland
Isabella Wranå	Jennie Wåhlin	Almida de Val	Fanny Sjöberg	Sundbyberg, Sweden
Sayaka Yoshimura	Kaho Onodera	Anna Ohmiya	Yumie Funayama	Sapporo, Japan

=== Round-robin standings ===
Final round-robin standings

Key
Teams to Playoffs

Pool A	W	L
(Ontario) Rachel Homan	4	0
(Northwest Territories) Kerry Galusha	3	1
(Japan) Seina Nakajima	2	2
(United States) Nina Roth	1	3
(Ontario) Danielle Inglis	0	4

Pool B	W	L
(Scotland) Eve Muirhead	4	0
(Sweden) Anna Hasselborg	2	2
(Ontario) Chrissy Cadorin	2	2
(Scotland) Sophie Jackson	1	3
(Switzerland) Team Feltscher	1	3

Pool C	W	L
(Switzerland) Silvana Tirinzoni	4	0
(Ontario) Hollie Duncan	2	2
(Sweden) Isabella Wranå	2	2
(Ontario) Cathy Auld	1	3
(Czech Republic) Anna Kubešková	1	3

Pool D	W	L
(Manitoba) Jennifer Jones	4	0
(South Korea) Gim Un-chi	3	1
(United States) Jamie Sinclair	2	2
(Switzerland) Elena Stern	1	3
(Ontario) Erica Hopson	0	4

Pool E	W	L
(Japan) Sayaka Yoshimura	3	1
(Manitoba) Tracy Fleury	3	1
(Ontario) Jennifer Harvey	2	2
(Prince Edward Island) Suzanne Birt	2	2
(Ontario) Kaitlyn Jones	0	4

=== Round-robin results ===
All draw times are listed in Eastern Time (UTC−05:00).

==== Draw 1 ====
Tuesday, September 10, 20:00

Sheet 3	1	2	3	4	5	6	7	8	Final
(Switzerland) Team Feltscher 🔨	0	0	1	2	0	3	0	1	7
(Scotland) Sophie Jackson	1	0	0	0	2	0	1	0	4

Sheet 4	1	2	3	4	5	6	7	8	Final
(Japan) Sayaka Yoshimura 🔨	1	0	1	0	0	0	X	X	2
(Ontario) Jennifer Harvey	0	1	0	2	1	4	X	X	8

Sheet 5	1	2	3	4	5	6	7	8	Final
(Switzerland) Elena Stern 🔨	0	0	1	0	1	0	1	0	3
(South Korea) Gim Un-chi	1	1	0	2	0	1	0	1	6

==== Draw 2 ====
Wednesday, September 11, 18:30

Sheet 1	1	2	3	4	5	6	7	8	Final
(Ontario) Rachel Homan	0	1	0	1	0	1	0	2	5
(Northwest Territories) Kerry Galusha 🔨	0	0	2	0	1	0	1	0	4

Sheet 2	1	2	3	4	5	6	7	8	Final
(Switzerland) Elena Stern	0	3	3	1	0	2	X	X	9
(Ontario) Erica Hopson 🔨	1	0	0	0	1	0	X	X	2

Sheet 4	1	2	3	4	5	6	7	8	Final
(Sweden) Anna Hasselborg	0	2	0	0	0	4	0	0	6
(Scotland) Sophie Jackson 🔨	1	0	2	1	2	0	2	1	9

Sheet 5	1	2	3	4	5	6	7	8	Final
(Switzerland) Silvana Tirinzoni 🔨	2	0	1	0	1	0	1	1	6
(Sweden) Isabella Wranå	0	1	0	2	0	2	0	0	5

==== Draw 3 ====
Wednesday, September 11, 21:00

Sheet 2	1	2	3	4	5	6	7	8	Final
(South Korea) Gim Un-chi 🔨	0	1	2	0	0	4	1	X	8
(United States) Jamie Sinclair	0	0	0	3	1	0	0	X	4

Sheet 3	1	2	3	4	5	6	7	8	Final
(Japan) Seina Nakajima	0	0	0	1	0	4	0	1	6
(United States) Nina Roth 🔨	0	0	2	0	2	0	1	0	5

Sheet 6	1	2	3	4	5	6	7	8	Final
(Japan) Sayaka Yoshimura 🔨	2	0	1	4	2	X	X	X	9
(Ontario) Kaitlyn Jones	0	2	0	0	0	X	X	X	2

==== Draw 4 ====
Thursday, September 12, 08:00

Sheet 3	1	2	3	4	5	6	7	8	Final
(Scotland) Eve Muirhead 🔨	1	0	1	1	0	0	0	1	4
(Ontario) Chrissy Cadorin	0	1	0	0	1	0	0	0	2

Sheet 4	1	2	3	4	5	6	7	8	Final
(Switzerland) Silvana Tirinzoni	0	2	0	0	0	2	0	1	5
(Czech Republic) Anna Kubešková 🔨	1	0	0	1	0	0	1	0	3

Sheet 5	1	2	3	4	5	6	7	8	Final
(Japan) Seina Nakajima 🔨	0	0	1	0	2	0	1	0	4
(Northwest Territories) Kerry Galusha	0	2	0	1	0	2	0	1	6

==== Draw 5 ====
Thursday, September 12, 10:45

Sheet 3	1	2	3	4	5	6	7	8	Final
(Manitoba) Jennifer Jones 🔨	1	0	2	0	0	0	6	X	9
(South Korea) Gim Un-chi	0	1	0	0	1	1	0	X	3

Sheet 5	1	2	3	4	5	6	7	8	Final
(United States) Nina Roth	1	0	0	0	1	1	0	2	5
(Ontario) Danielle Inglis 🔨	0	1	1	1	0	0	1	0	4

==== Draw 6 ====
Thursday, September 12, 13:30

Sheet 2	1	2	3	4	5	6	7	8	Final
(Japan) Sayaka Yoshimura	0	2	2	1	0	2	0	1	8
(Prince Edward Island) Suzanne Birt 🔨	2	0	0	0	1	0	3	0	6

Sheet 3	1	2	3	4	5	6	7	8	Final
(Sweden) Isabella Wranå 🔨	3	0	0	3	1	1	X	X	8
(Ontario) Cathy Auld	0	1	0	0	0	0	X	X	1

Sheet 4	1	2	3	4	5	6	7	8	Final
(Switzerland) Elena Stern	0	0	2	0	0	1	0	0	3
(United States) Jamie Sinclair 🔨	0	2	0	2	0	0	0	1	5

Sheet 5	1	2	3	4	5	6	7	8	Final
(Scotland) Eve Muirhead 🔨	1	1	0	1	0	1	2	X	6
(Switzerland) Team Feltscher	0	0	2	0	1	0	0	X	3

Sheet 6	1	2	3	4	5	6	7	8	Final
(Ontario) Hollie Duncan 🔨	1	1	0	0	3	2	2	X	9
(Czech Republic) Anna Kubešková	0	0	1	1	0	0	0	X	2

==== Draw 7 ====
Thursday, September 12, 16:15

Sheet 3	1	2	3	4	5	6	7	8	Final
(Sweden) Anna Hasselborg 🔨	1	3	1	1	0	2	X	X	8
(Ontario) Chrissy Cadorin	0	0	0	0	1	0	X	X	1

==== Draw 8 ====
Thursday, September 12, 19:00

Sheet 1	1	2	3	4	5	6	7	8	Final
(Ontario) Hollie Duncan 🔨	1	0	1	0	1	0	1	X	4
(Ontario) Cathy Auld	0	1	0	2	0	2	0	X	5

Sheet 3	1	2	3	4	5	6	7	8	Final
(Prince Edward Island) Suzanne Birt	0	0	1	2	0	3	0	1	7
(Ontario) Kaitlyn Jones 🔨	1	1	0	0	1	0	3	0	6

Sheet 4	1	2	3	4	5	6	7	8	Final
(Manitoba) Jennifer Jones	1	1	4	0	3	X	X	X	9
(Ontario) Erica Hopson 🔨	0	0	0	1	0	X	X	X	1

Sheet 6	1	2	3	4	5	6	7	8	Final
(Ontario) Rachel Homan	0	2	0	1	0	2	2	X	7
(Ontario) Danielle Inglis 🔨	1	0	2	0	1	0	0	X	4

==== Draw 9 ====
Thursday, September 12, 21:30

Sheet 6	1	2	3	4	5	6	7	8	9	Final
(Manitoba) Tracy Fleury 🔨	2	0	0	2	0	0	1	0	1	6
(Ontario) Jennifer Harvey	0	0	1	0	1	0	0	3	0	5

==== Draw 10 ====
Friday, September 13, 08:00

Sheet 1	1	2	3	4	5	6	7	8	9	Final
(Scotland) Eve Muirhead	0	0	1	3	0	0	1	0	2	7
(Scotland) Sophie Jackson 🔨	0	1	0	0	1	1	0	2	0	5

Sheet 4	1	2	3	4	5	6	7	8	Final
(United States) Nina Roth	0	0	1	0	2	0	0	X	3
(Northwest Territories) Kerry Galusha 🔨	1	1	0	1	0	2	1	X	6

Sheet 6	1	2	3	4	5	6	7	8	Final
(Sweden) Anna Hasselborg	0	2	2	1	0	1	1	X	7
(Switzerland) Team Feltscher 🔨	2	0	0	0	1	0	0	X	3

==== Draw 11 ====
Friday, September 13, 10:45

Sheet 1	1	2	3	4	5	6	7	8	Final
(Manitoba) Tracy Fleury	0	0	2	0	2	0	0	X	4
(Japan) Sayaka Yoshimura 🔨	0	1	0	1	0	3	4	X	9

==== Draw 12 ====
Friday, September 13, 13:30

Sheet 5	1	2	3	4	5	6	7	8	Final
(Manitoba) Jennifer Jones 🔨	1	0	0	2	0	1	0	1	5
(United States) Jamie Sinclair	0	0	1	0	2	0	1	0	4

Sheet 6	1	2	3	4	5	6	7	8	Final
(Switzerland) Team Feltscher	0	0	0	0	1	1	1	X	3
(Ontario) Chrissy Cadorin 🔨	1	1	2	1	0	0	0	X	5

==== Draw 13 ====
Friday, September 13, 16:15

Sheet 1	1	2	3	4	5	6	7	8	Final
(Japan) Seina Nakajima	0	1	1	0	1	0	3	X	6
(Ontario) Danielle Inglis 🔨	1	0	0	1	0	1	0	X	3

Sheet 2	1	2	3	4	5	6	7	8	Final
(Ontario) Rachel Homan 🔨	1	0	2	0	1	0	2	X	6
(United States) Nina Roth	0	1	0	2	0	1	0	X	4

Sheet 3	1	2	3	4	5	6	7	8	9	Final
(Switzerland) Silvana Tirinzoni	0	0	1	0	1	1	1	0	1	5
(Ontario) Hollie Duncan	1	1	0	1	0	0	0	1	0	4

Sheet 4	1	2	3	4	5	6	7	8	Final
(Manitoba) Tracy Fleury	0	1	1	1	0	0	1	0	4
(Prince Edward Island) Suzanne Birt 🔨	0	0	0	0	0	2	0	1	3

Sheet 5	1	2	3	4	5	6	7	8	Final
(Ontario) Kaitlyn Jones 🔨	1	1	1	0	1	0	0	0	4
(Ontario) Jennifer Harvey	0	0	0	1	0	4	1	1	7

==== Draw 14 ====
Friday, September 13, 19:00

Sheet 1	1	2	3	4	5	6	7	8	Final
(South Korea) Gim Un-chi	2	0	3	0	3	0	X	X	8
(Ontario) Erica Hopson 🔨	0	0	0	3	0	1	X	X	4

==== Draw 15 ====
Friday, September 13, 21:30

Sheet 1	1	2	3	4	5	6	7	8	9	Final
(Manitoba) Jennifer Jones 🔨	0	0	2	0	5	0	0	0	1	8
(Switzerland) Elena Stern	1	0	0	1	0	3	1	1	0	7

Sheet 2	1	2	3	4	5	6	7	8	Final
(Ontario) Cathy Auld	0	1	0	0	1	2	1	0	5
(Czech Republic) Anna Kubešková 🔨	2	0	1	1	0	0	0	2	6

Sheet 3	1	2	3	4	5	6	7	8	Final
(Prince Edward Island) Suzanne Birt	0	0	2	1	0	2	2	X	7
(Ontario) Jennifer Harvey 🔨	1	0	0	0	1	0	0	X	2

Sheet 6	1	2	3	4	5	6	7	8	Final
(Sweden) Isabella Wranå	1	2	0	0	0	1	0	0	4
(Ontario) Hollie Duncan 🔨	0	0	1	1	1	0	2	3	8

==== Draw 16 ====
Saturday, September 14, 08:00

Sheet 3	1	2	3	4	5	6	7	8	9	Final
(Ontario) Rachel Homan 🔨	0	0	1	0	3	3	0	0	1	8
(Japan) Seina Nakajima	0	1	0	3	0	0	2	1	0	7

Sheet 4	1	2	3	4	5	6	7	8	Final
(United States) Jamie Sinclair 🔨	2	2	2	1	X	X	X	X	7
(Ontario) Erica Hopson	0	0	0	0	X	X	X	X	0

Sheet 6	1	2	3	4	5	6	7	8	Final
(Ontario) Kaitlyn Jones 🔨	1	0	0	0	1	X	X	X	2
(Manitoba) Tracy Fleury	0	3	0	2	0	X	X	X	5

==== Draw 17 ====
Saturday, September 14, 10:45

Sheet 2	1	2	3	4	5	6	7	8	Final
(Northwest Territories) Kerry Galusha 🔨	2	0	2	0	2	1	X	X	7
(Ontario) Danielle Inglis	0	1	0	1	0	0	X	X	2

Sheet 3	1	2	3	4	5	6	7	8	Final
(Sweden) Isabella Wranå	1	0	3	0	0	3	0	0	7
(Czech Republic) Anna Kubešková 🔨	0	1	0	1	1	0	2	1	6

Sheet 4	1	2	3	4	5	6	7	8	Final
(Scotland) Sophie Jackson 🔨	1	2	0	0	0	2	0	0	5
(Ontario) Chrissy Cadorin	0	0	2	1	0	0	1	2	6

Sheet 6	1	2	3	4	5	6	7	8	Final
(Switzerland) Silvana Tirinzoni	0	1	2	2	0	1	0	X	6
(Ontario) Cathy Auld 🔨	0	0	0	0	1	0	2	X	3

==== Draw 18 ====
Saturday, September 14, 13:30

Sheet 2	1	2	3	4	5	6	7	8	Final
(Sweden) Anna Hasselborg 🔨	2	2	0	0	1	0	0	X	5
(Scotland) Eve Muirhead	0	0	2	4	0	3	2	X	11

=== Playoffs ===
Quarterfinals
1	(Switzerland) Silvana Tirinzoni	5
8	(Manitoba) Tracy Fleury	7
4	(Ontario) Rachel Homan	6
5	(Northwest Territories) Kerry Galusha	4
3	(Manitoba) Jennifer Jones	6
6	(Japan) Sayaka Yoshimura	1
2	(Scotland) Eve Muirhead	3
7	(South Korea) Gim Un-chi	4

Semifinals
8	(Manitoba) Tracy Fleury	5
4	(Ontario) Rachel Homan	4
3	(Manitoba) Jennifer Jones	9
7	(South Korea) Gim Un-chi	0

Final
8	(Manitoba) Tracy Fleury	4
3	(Manitoba) Jennifer Jones	6

==== Quarterfinals ====
Saturday, September 14, 19:00

Sheet 4	1	2	3	4	5	6	7	8	Final
(Manitoba) Jennifer Jones 🔨	1	0	2	0	1	1	1	X	6
(Japan) Sayaka Yoshimura	0	0	0	1	0	0	0	X	1

Sheet 5	1	2	3	4	5	6	7	8	Final
(Ontario) Rachel Homan 🔨	0	3	0	1	0	2	0	X	6
(Northwest Territories) Kerry Galusha	0	0	2	0	1	0	1	X	4

Sunday, September 15, 09:00

Sheet 2	1	2	3	4	5	6	7	8	Final
(Switzerland) Silvana Tirinzoni 🔨	3	0	0	1	0	0	1	0	5
(Manitoba) Tracy Fleury	0	2	1	0	2	1	0	1	7

Sheet 6	1	2	3	4	5	6	7	8	Final
(Scotland) Eve Muirhead 🔨	1	0	1	0	0	1	0	0	3
(South Korea) Gim Un-chi	0	0	0	2	0	0	1	1	4

==== Semifinals ====
Sunday, September 15, 12:30

Sheet 3	1	2	3	4	5	6	7	8	Final
(Manitoba) Tracy Fleury	0	1	0	1	0	1	0	2	5
(Ontario) Rachel Homan 🔨	1	0	0	0	1	0	2	0	4

Sheet 5	1	2	3	4	5	6	7	8	Final
(Manitoba) Jennifer Jones 🔨	3	1	1	1	3	X	X	X	9
(South Korea) Gim Un-chi	0	0	0	0	0	X	X	X	0

==== Final ====
Sunday, September 15, 15:30

Sheet 4	1	2	3	4	5	6	7	8	Final
(Manitoba) Tracy Fleury	0	0	0	1	0	1	2	0	4
(Manitoba) Jennifer Jones 🔨	0	0	4	0	1	0	0	1	6
