= Easygo =

Australian online gaming and entertainment company

- Type: Private
- Industry: Video game development, livestreaming
- Founded: 2016
- Headquarters: Melbourne, Victoria, Australia
- Revenue: A$970 million (FY2024–25)
- Net income: A$257 million (FY2024–25)
- Number of employees: 636 (FY2024–25)
- Website: easygo.io

Easygo is an Australian technology company headquartered in Melbourne, Victoria. It was founded in 2016 by Ed Craven and Bijan Tehrani.

The company develops software and provides technology and operational services for online gambling platform Stake.com and livestreaming service Kick, launched in 2022. Its activities include software development for online gambling and livestreaming products.

For the financial year ended 30 June 2025, its holding company, Easygo Group Holdings, reported revenue of A$970 million and net profit of A$257 million.

== History ==
Co-founders Ed Craven and Bijan Tehrani met as teenagers through the online game RuneScape, where they operated an in-game wagering system. In 2013, they and their associates launched Primedice, an online dice game that accepted bets in Bitcoin.

In 2016, Craven and Tehrani established Easygo in Melbourne as a software and game-development company serving the online gambling industry. The company subsequently developed the technology and provided services for Stake.com, an online gambling platform launched in 2017. Stake's growth contributed to the expansion of Easygo's operations.

In 2022, Easygo expanded into livestreaming with the launch of Kick, a streaming platform that emerged as a competitor to Twitch. In May 2024, Easygo Entertainment became a substantial shareholder in Australian bookmaker PointsBet Holdings, holding more than five per cent of the company.

In January 2026, Easygo consolidated several of its in-house game studios under the name Easygo Games. In November 2025, the company announced plans to relocate its Melbourne headquarters to a larger office campus in Cremorne.

In October 2026, co-founder Ed Craven was ranked second on the Australian Financial Review Young Rich List, which ranks Australians aged 40 and under, with an estimated net worth of A$5.2 billion.

== Finances ==
For the financial year ended 30 June 2025, Easygo Group Holdings reported revenue of approximately A$970 million and net profit of A$257 million (about US$171 million) in accounts filed with the Australian Securities and Investments Commission. The company paid approximately A$152 million in corporate tax and reported net assets of A$5.07 billion. Trade reporting described the result as placing the group among Australia's larger privately held companies.

== Corporate structure ==
Easygo operates through several related Australian companies. Easygo Group Holdings Pty Ltd was registered on 1 May 2024 and became the group's holding company following a corporate restructuring in December 2024. A share sale agreement disclosed in a filing to the Australian Securities Exchange showed that Easygo Group Holdings and Easygo Solutions acquired relevant interests in Easygo Entertainment, while co-founders Ed Craven and Bijan Tehrani continued to hold interests through the revised group structure.

== Game development and distribution ==
In April 2025, Stake launched Stake Engine, a remote gaming server providing tools for game development and distribution. In September 2026, five studios previously developing games exclusively for Stake were spun off from Easygo to form Juice, a Melbourne-based business-to-business game provider led by former Easygo chief strategy officer Brais Pena Sanchez. That month, Stake Engine was rebranded as Engine and opened to other gambling operators, while Juice's game catalogue became available to third-party platforms, with Roobet among its first distributors.

== See also ==
- Kick (service)
- Stake (online casino)
- Online gambling
- Interactive Gambling Act 2001
- Livestreaming
