= Macarthur family =

Pastoral family

Macarthur
- Current region: Australia
- Origin: Stoke Damerel near Plymouth, England
- Members: John Macarthur; Elizabeth Macarthur; Edward Macarthur; William Macarthur; James Macarthur
- Connected members: James Bowman; Henry Parker; James Macarthur-Onslow; Arthur Macarthur-Onslow; George Macarthur-Onslow; Denzil Macarthur-Onslow

Members of the Macarthur family, and their descendants, the Macarthur-Onslow family, are prominent pastoral, political, and business leaders with origins in Australia and the United Kingdom. The family is known for its pioneering development of the Australian Merino wool industry and its pastoral interests, including Camden Park Estate, Elizabeth Farm, and Hambledon Cottage. Several family members served in the military and in political life in the NSW Parliament.

== Family tree ==
=== Macarthur family ===
- Alexander Macarthur m.
  - James Macarthur m.
    - Hannibal Hawkins Macarthur (1788–1861) m. Anna Maria, née King (???–1852), (m. 1812)
      - James Campbell Macarthur (1813–1862)
      - Elizabeth Macarthur (1815–1899) m. Philip Gidley King (1817–1904)
        - Phillip Parker Macarthur King (1844–1902) m. Mabella Winton, née Pringle (1846–1926)
        - George Bartholomew Gidley King
        - John Lethbridge King
        - Elizabeth Maria King (1867–1933) m. Lieutenant Henry Edward Goldfinch
      - Anna Macarthur (1816–1852) m. Commander John Clements Wickham
      - Charles Macarthur (1820–1871)
      - Rev. George Fairfowl Macarthur (1825–1890) m. Priddle
        - Margaret Isabella Priddle (?–1917) m. Dr. Walter Sigismund Brown (1861–1936)
      - John Alexander Macarthur (1827–1904)
        - Edward Hannibal Macarthur (1859–1947) m. Mary, née Wildash
        - Annie Mary Macarthur (1866–1914) m. W. Bracker
      - Arthur Hannibal Macarthur (1830–1871) m. Emmeline Helen, née Allan (1837–1904)
        - Enid Emma Macarthur m. James William Macarthur—Onslow (1867–1946); also see below
    - John Macarthur (1791–1862)
  - John Macarthur (1767–1834) m. Elizabeth, née Veale (1766–1850)
    - Sir Edward Macarthur (1789–1872) m. Sarah, née Neil in 1862
    - Elizabeth Macarthur (1792–1842)
    - James Macarthur (1793–1794)
    - John Macarthur (1794–1831)
    - Mary Isabella Macarthur (1795–1852) m. James Bowman (1784–1846)
      - Isabella Macarthur m. James Kinghorne Chisholm (1830–1912)
    - James Macarthur (1798–1867) m. Emily, née Stone
      - Elizabeth Macarthur (1840–1911) m. Captain Arthur Alexander Walton Onslow (1833–1882); Elizabeth changed her name to Macarthur—Onslow, following the death of her husband in 1892
        - James William Macarthur—Onslow (1867–1946) m. Enid Emma, née Macarthur; also see above
        - James Arthur Macarthur—Onslow (1898–1959) m. Constance, née Herbert; disinherited and bankrupted by his father
        - Helen Maud Macarthur—Onslow (1899–1968) m. Major General Sir Reginald Stanham; inherited Camden Park Estate
          - Brigadier Richard Quentin Macarthur—Stanham; inherited Camden Park Estate
        - Elizabeth Enid Macarthur—Onslow (1903–1990) m. Frederick Rothe
        - William Macarthur—Onslow; died in WWI
        - Emily Susan Macarthur—Onslow (1869–1876)
        - Rosa Sibella Macarthur—Onslow (1871–1943)
        - Brigadier General George Macleay Macarthur—Onslow (1875–1931) m. Violet Marguerite, née Gordon (m. 16 October 1909 at Manar, near Braidwood)
        - (Francis) Arthur Macarthur-Onslow (1879–1938) m. Sylvia Seton Raymond, née Chisholm (m. 16 May 1903 at Goulburn)
          - Major General Sir Denzil Macarthur—Onslow (1904–1984) m. Elinor Margaret, née Caldwell (m. 1927; div. c. 1945)
            - Denzil Ian Macarthur—Onslow
              - Verena Marie Macarthur—Onslow
                - Ed Craven
            - Neil Macarthur—Onslow
            - Diana Macarthur—Onslow
            - Ewan Macarthur—Onslow
          - Major General Sir Denzil Macarthur—Onslow (1904–1984) m. Dorothy Wolseley Conagher, née Scott (c. 1923–2013); (m. 1950 in Petersham)
            - Katrina Macarthur—Onslow m. Sir Charles Hobhouse
            - Lee Macarthur—Onslow (1952–2021)
    - Sir William Macarthur (1800–1882)
    - Emmeline Macarthur (b. 1808) m. Henry Parker

=== Macarthur-Onslow family ===
- Arthur Pooley Onslow m. Rosa Roberta, née Macleay (m. 1832)
  - Captain Arthur Alexander Walton Onslow (1833–1882) m. Elizabeth, née Macarthur (1840–1911); changed her name to Macarthur-Onslow in 1892
    - see above for listing of subsequent generations
  - Sir Alexander Campbell Onslow (1842–1908)

== See also ==
- Political families of Australia
