= Bijan Tehrani (entrepreneur) =

Australian entrepreneur

- Born: United States
- Occupation: Entrepreneur
- Known for: Co-founder of Stake.com, Co-founder of Kick
- Notable work: Stake.com, Kick, Easygo

Bijan Tehrani is an Australian billionaire and co-founder of Stake, the largest crypto-backed online casino in the world. He is also a co-founder of Kick, a livestreaming platform.

== Biography ==
Tehrani was born in the United States to Iranian parents, and later moved to Australia, where he resides in Melbourne.

In 2016, Bijan Tehrani founded Easygo, a company that developed games for online casinos.

=== Stake ===
In August 2017, Tehrani with Ed Craven co-founded Stake.com, an online casino, which operates using cryptocurrency.

Despite facing restrictions in the United States, United Kingdom, and much of Europe (Italy and Denmark), Stake.com generated $4.7 billion in revenue in 2024. The founders reinvested profits into marketing strategies, including partnerships with major sports organizations including Formula 1, the English Premier League, and the UFC.

Stake's revenue surged during the COVID-19 pandemic, particularly through a partnership with content creators on Twitch who livestreamed gambling activities. This collaboration helped the company grow from $100 million in revenue to $2 billion in two years. However, after Twitch banned Stake from advertising due to concerns about consumer protections, Tehrani and Craven launched Kick in January 2023, a direct competitor to Twitch. Tehrani stated that the platform aims for long-term growth and will either surpass Twitch or acquire it.

In May 2024, Tehrani, together with Craven, acquired a more than 5% of the ASX-listed online bookmaker PointsBet.

=== Political activities ===
Tehrani donated $1.3 million to the presidential campaign of Donald Trump in 2024 and $1 million in 2026.

== Wealth ==
In 2025, Bijan Tehrani was included in Australia’s 50 Richest and The World's Billionaires list by Forbes. As of May 2025, Forbes estimated Bijan Tehrani’s net worth at $2.8 billion.
