= Denzil Macarthur-Onslow =

Australian Army officer (1904–1984)

Sir Denzil Macarthur-Onslow
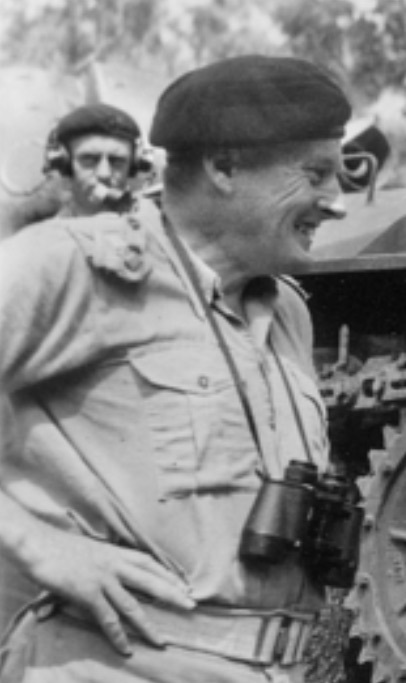
- Macarthur-Onslow, 1953
- Born: 5 March 1904; Whataupoko, New Zealand
- Died: 30 November 1984 (aged 80); Castle Hill, Australia
- Relatives: Arthur Macarthur-Onslow (father); James Macarthur-Onslow (uncle); George Macarthur-Onslow (uncle); Ed Craven (grandson)
- Military career
- Allegiance: Australia
- Branch: Australian Army
- Service years: 1924–1932; 1935–1946; 1947–1960
- Rank: Major General
- Commands: 2nd Division (1954–58); 4th Armoured Brigade (1943–46); 1st Armoured Brigade (1942–43, 1947–53); 6th Division Cavalry Regiment (1941–42)
- Conflicts: Second World War; Western Desert Campaign; Battle of Bardia; Syria–Lebanon Campaign; Battle of Merdjayoun; New Guinea campaign
- Awards: Knight Bachelor; Commander of the Order of the British Empire; Distinguished Service Order; Mentioned in Despatches (2); Efficiency Decoration

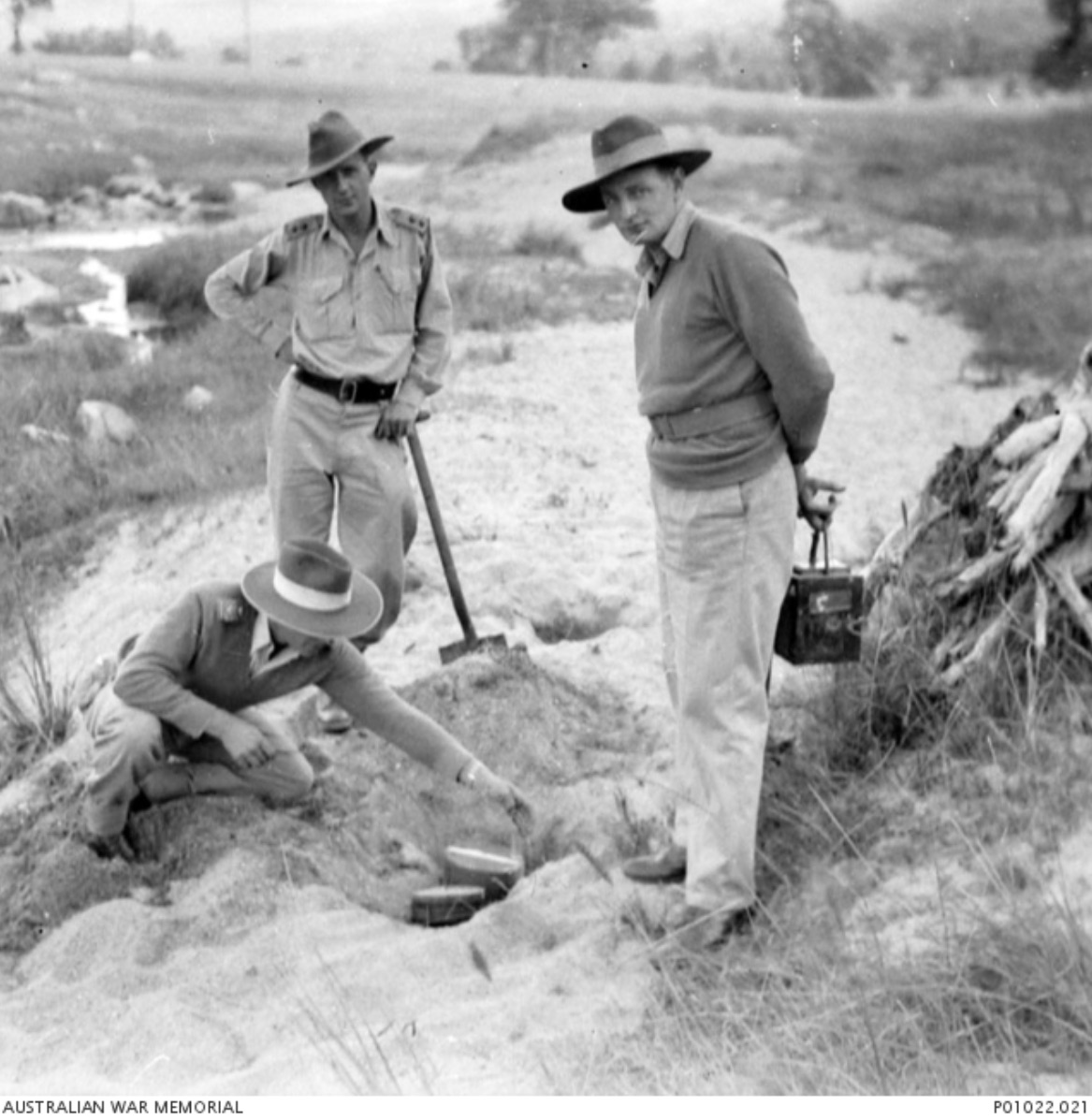
Macarthur-Onslow (right) with men training in anti-tank mines, c.1942

Major General Sir Denzil Macarthur-Onslow, CBE, DSO, ED (5 March 1904 – 30 November 1984) was an Australian Army officer, businessman and grazier.

== Biography ==
Macarthur-Onslow, the son of grazier Arthur Macarthur-Onslow, enlisted in the Citizens Military Force in 1924. In 1935, he was appointed captain Ex Reserve of Officers in the 2nd Military District of the Australian Field Artillery; on 31 June 1936 he was appointed a captain in the Royal Australian Artillery. On 26 May 1939, he was appointed captain of the 2nd Australian Armoured Regiment and a captain in the Second Australian Imperial Force. He was promoted major in October 1939 and served with the 6th Australian Division Reconnaissance Regiment. On 11 June 1941 he was promoted lieutenant colonel and placed in command of the 6th Division Cavalry Regiment, and on 23 April 1942 was appointed second in command of the 1st Armoured Brigade. On 14 July he was promoted temporary brigadier to command of the brigade. From February 1943 until February 1946 Macarthur-Onslow commanded the 4th Armoured Brigade. He relinquished command in March 1946 and was granted the rank of honorary brigadier; he was promoted brigadier on 4 January 1949. He was discharged in August 1953 but re-enlisted in August 1954, commanding the 2nd Division; he transferred to the Reserve on 1 December 1957 and was appointed to the Military Board on 1 December 1958 as a major general.

Between 1966 and 1979, he served as President of the National Rifle Association of Australia.

Macarthur-Onslow was also politically active; he was by far the most successful candidate for the Liberal Democratic Party at the 1943 federal election, coming close to winning the seat of Eden-Monaro. He contested Eden-Monaro again for the Liberal Party in 1946 and 1949.
