= 2025 PointsBet Invitational =

- Host city: Calgary, Alberta
- Arena: Markin MacPhail Centre, Canada Olympic Park
- Dates: October 1–5
- Men's winner: (Manitoba) Team Dunstone
- Curling club: Fort Rouge CC, Winnipeg
- Skip: Matt Dunstone
- Third: Colton Lott
- Second: E. J. Harnden
- Lead: Ryan Harnden
- Coach: Caleb Flaxey
- Finalist: (Alberta) Brad Jacobs
- Women's winner: (Ontario) Team Homan
- Curling club: Ottawa CC, Ottawa
- Skip: Rachel Homan
- Third: Tracy Fleury
- Second: Emma Miskew
- Lead: Sarah Wilkes
- Alternate: Rachelle Brown
- Coach: Heather Nedohin
- Finalist: (British Columbia) Corryn Brown

The 2025 PointsBet Invitational curling tournament was held from October 1 to 5 at the Markin MacPhail Centre at Canada Olympic Park in Calgary, Alberta. The event features twenty Canadian teams and is the first major event of the 2025–26 Season of Champions for Curling Canada. In a change of format, the event is being played in a round-robin tournament with the top team in each pool advancing to the final. The winning team on both the men's and women's side will receive $35,000 each.

== Qualification ==
With the change in format from a single-knockout to a round robin, the field was reduced from sixteen to ten teams. The seven teams qualified for the 2025 Canadian Olympic Curling Trials all received invitations, while the final three spots were filled by the top ranked non-qualified team, the top ranked non-qualified Under-27 team and the winners of the 2025 Canadian Junior Curling Championships.

=== Men ===
Trials field:

- (Manitoba) Matt Dunstone
- (Ontario) John Epping
- (Newfoundland and Labrador) Brad Gushue
- (Alberta) Brad Jacobs
- (Saskatchewan) Rylan Kleiter
- (Alberta) Kevin Koe
- (Saskatchewan) Mike McEwen

CTRS team:

- (Manitoba) Jordon McDonald

NextGen U27 qualifier:

- (Ontario) Sam Mooibroek

Junior champions:

- (Nova Scotia) Calan MacIsaac

=== Women ===
Trials field:

- (Nova Scotia) Christina Black
- (British Columbia) Corryn Brown
- (Manitoba) Kate Cameron
- (Manitoba) Kerri Einarson
- (Ontario) Rachel Homan
- (Manitoba) Kaitlyn Lawes
- (Alberta) Kayla Skrlik

CTRS team:

- (Manitoba) Beth Peterson

NextGen U27 qualifier:

- (Alberta) Selena Sturmay

Junior champions:

- (Alberta) Myla Plett

== Men ==
=== Teams ===
The teams are listed as follows:

Skip	Third	Second	Lead	Alternate	Club
Matt Dunstone	Colton Lott	E. J. Harnden	Ryan Harnden		Fort Rouge CC, Winnipeg, Manitoba
John Epping	Jacob Horgan	Tanner Horgan	Ian McMillan		Northern Credit Union CC, Sudbury, Ontario
Brad Gushue	Mark Nichols	Brendan Bottcher	Geoff Walker	Adam Casey	St. John's CC, St. John's, Newfoundland and Labrador
Brad Jacobs	Marc Kennedy	Brett Gallant	Ben Hebert		The Glencoe Club, Calgary, Alberta
Rylan Kleiter	Joshua Mattern	Matthew Hall	Trevor Johnson		Nutana CC, Saskatoon, Saskatchewan
Kevin Koe	Tyler Tardi	Aaron Sluchinski	Karrick Martin	Mike Libbus	The Glencoe Club, Calgary, Alberta
Calan MacIsaac	Nathan Gray	Owain Fisher	Christopher McCurdy	Nick Mosher	Truro CC, Truro, Nova Scotia
Jordon McDonald	Jacques Gauthier	Elias Huminicki	Cameron Olafson		Assiniboine Memorial CC, Winnipeg, Manitoba
Mike McEwen	Colton Flasch	Kevin Marsh	Dan Marsh		Nutana CC, Saskatoon, Saskatchewan
Sam Mooibroek	Ryan Wiebe	Scott Mitchell	Nathan Steele		Whitby CC, Whitby, Ontario

=== Round robin standings ===
Final Round Robin Standings

Key
Teams to Final

Pool A
Skip	W	SOW	SOL	L	PF	PA	EW	EL	BE	SE	Pts
(Alberta) Brad Jacobs	3	0	0	1	33	16	19	11	4	6	9
(Ontario) John Epping	2	1	0	1	32	25	18	15	2	3	8
(Newfoundland and Labrador) Brad Gushue	2	0	1	1	29	30	16	19	3	0	7
(Alberta) Kevin Koe	2	0	0	2	22	24	14	15	4	1	6
(Nova Scotia) Calan MacIsaac	0	0	0	4	14	35	11	18	3	2	0

Pool B
Skip	W	SOW	SOL	L	PF	PA	EW	EL	BE	SE	Pts
(Manitoba) Matt Dunstone	3	0	0	1	28	22	17	14	4	4	9
(Saskatchewan) Mike McEwen	3	0	0	1	28	19	17	14	1	7	9
(Manitoba) Jordon McDonald	3	0	0	1	34	22	19	15	1	5	9
(Saskatchewan) Rylan Kleiter	1	0	0	3	15	21	11	15	3	3	3
(Ontario) Sam Mooibroek	0	0	0	4	17	38	13	19	0	3	0

=== Round robin results ===
All draw times are listed in Mountain Time (UTC−07:00).

==== Draw 1 ====
Wednesday, October 1, 1:30 pm

Sheet B	1	2	3	4	5	6	7	8	9	10	Final
(Manitoba) Matt Dunstone 🔨	0	0	2	1	0	0	1	0	1	X	5
(Saskatchewan) Rylan Kleiter	0	0	0	0	2	0	0	1	0	X	3

Sheet C	1	2	3	4	5	6	7	8	9	10	Final
(Nova Scotia) Calan MacIsaac 🔨	0	1	0	1	0	0	1	0	2	1	6
(Newfoundland and Labrador) Brad Gushue	0	0	4	0	1	0	0	3	0	0	8

==== Draw 2 ====
Wednesday, October 1, 6:30 pm

Sheet A	1	2	3	4	5	6	7	8	9	10	Final
(Ontario) Sam Mooibroek 🔨	1	2	0	0	0	1	0	0	X	X	4
(Saskatchewan) Mike McEwen	0	0	2	4	2	0	1	1	X	X	10

Sheet D	1	2	3	4	5	6	7	8	9	10	Final
(Alberta) Brad Jacobs 🔨	1	0	0	1	0	2	0	0	1	0	5
(Alberta) Kevin Koe	0	1	0	0	2	0	1	0	0	2	6

==== Draw 3 ====
Thursday, October 2, 1:30 pm

Sheet B	1	2	3	4	5	6	7	8	9	10	11	Final
(Newfoundland and Labrador) Brad Gushue 🔨	3	0	0	2	0	1	0	1	0	2	0	9
(Ontario) John Epping	0	2	1	0	3	0	2	0	1	0	1	10

Sheet E	1	2	3	4	5	6	7	8	9	10	Final
(Saskatchewan) Rylan Kleiter	0	0	1	0	0	0	2	0	X	X	3
(Manitoba) Jordon McDonald 🔨	0	3	0	1	1	1	0	2	X	X	8

==== Draw 4 ====
Thursday, October 2, 6:30 pm

Sheet A	1	2	3	4	5	6	7	8	9	10	Final
(Alberta) Brad Jacobs 🔨	0	3	2	2	2	2	0	1	X	X	12
(Nova Scotia) Calan MacIsaac	0	0	0	0	0	0	0	0	X	X	0

Sheet C	1	2	3	4	5	6	7	8	9	10	Final
(Ontario) Sam Mooibroek	1	0	2	0	1	0	0	1	1	0	6
(Manitoba) Matt Dunstone 🔨	0	3	0	2	0	0	1	0	0	3	9

Sheet D	1	2	3	4	5	6	7	8	9	10	Final
(Saskatchewan) Mike McEwen 🔨	2	0	2	1	0	1	0	0	2	X	8
(Manitoba) Jordon McDonald	0	1	0	0	1	0	1	1	0	X	4

Sheet E	1	2	3	4	5	6	7	8	9	10	Final
(Alberta) Kevin Koe	0	0	0	1	0	2	0	0	0	X	3
(Ontario) John Epping 🔨	2	0	0	0	1	0	0	2	4	X	9

==== Draw 5 ====
Friday, October 3, 1:30 pm

Sheet C	1	2	3	4	5	6	7	8	9	10	Final
(Saskatchewan) Mike McEwen 🔨	2	1	0	1	1	2	0	0	X	X	7
(Saskatchewan) Rylan Kleiter	0	0	1	0	0	0	0	1	X	X	2

==== Draw 6 ====
Friday, October 3, 6:30 pm

Sheet A	1	2	3	4	5	6	7	8	9	10	Final
(Manitoba) Jordon McDonald	1	0	3	2	0	1	0	0	3	X	10
(Manitoba) Matt Dunstone 🔨	0	1	0	0	1	0	2	1	0	X	5

Sheet D	1	2	3	4	5	6	7	8	9	10	Final
(Ontario) John Epping 🔨	1	0	2	0	0	2	1	0	2	X	8
(Nova Scotia) Calan MacIsaac	0	3	0	0	1	0	0	1	0	X	5

Sheet E	1	2	3	4	5	6	7	8	9	10	Final
(Newfoundland and Labrador) Brad Gushue	0	1	0	0	1	0	2	0	1	X	5
(Alberta) Brad Jacobs 🔨	2	0	3	0	0	2	0	1	0	X	8

==== Draw 7 ====
Saturday, October 4, 1:30 pm

Sheet B	1	2	3	4	5	6	7	8	9	10	Final
(Nova Scotia) Calan MacIsaac 🔨	1	0	1	0	1	0	0	0	0	X	3
(Alberta) Kevin Koe	0	2	0	3	0	0	0	1	1	X	7

Sheet D	1	2	3	4	5	6	7	8	9	10	Final
(Saskatchewan) Rylan Kleiter 🔨	1	1	0	0	0	2	1	2	X	X	7
(Ontario) Sam Mooibroek	0	0	1	0	0	0	0	0	X	X	1

Sheet E	1	2	3	4	5	6	7	8	9	10	Final
(Manitoba) Matt Dunstone 🔨	2	0	1	1	0	3	0	2	X	X	9
(Saskatchewan) Mike McEwen	0	0	0	0	1	0	2	0	X	X	3

==== Draw 8 ====
Saturday, October 4, 6:30 pm

Sheet A	1	2	3	4	5	6	7	8	9	10	Final
(Alberta) Kevin Koe	0	2	0	2	0	1	0	0	0	1	6
(Newfoundland and Labrador) Brad Gushue 🔨	1	0	2	0	1	0	0	0	3	0	7

Sheet B	1	2	3	4	5	6	7	8	9	10	Final
(Manitoba) Jordon McDonald 🔨	2	0	1	0	3	0	3	0	3	X	12
(Ontario) Sam Mooibroek	0	2	0	1	0	1	0	2	0	X	6

Sheet C	1	2	3	4	5	6	7	8	9	10	Final
(Ontario) John Epping	0	0	1	0	0	0	3	0	1	0	5
(Alberta) Brad Jacobs 🔨	0	2	0	1	1	0	0	2	0	2	8

=== Final ===
Sunday, October 5, 4:00 pm

Sheet C	1	2	3	4	5	6	7	8	9	10	Final
(Alberta) Brad Jacobs 🔨	0	0	1	0	1	0	0	1	0	1	4
(Manitoba) Matt Dunstone	0	0	0	2	0	1	0	0	3	0	6

Player percentages
(Alberta) Team Jacobs		(Manitoba) Team Dunstone	
Ben Hebert	95%	Ryan Harnden	96%
Brett Gallant	88%	E. J. Harnden	83%
Marc Kennedy	88%	Colton Lott	83%
Brad Jacobs	83%	Matt Dunstone	89%
Total	88%	Total	88%

== Women ==
=== Teams ===
The teams are listed as follows:

Skip	Third	Second	Lead	Alternate	Club
Christina Black	Jill Brothers	Jenn Baxter	Karlee Everist	Marlee Powers	Halifax CC, Halifax, Nova Scotia
Corryn Brown	Erin Pincott	Sarah Koltun	Samantha Fisher		Kamloops CC, Kamloops, British Columbia
Kate Cameron	Briane Harris	Taylor McDonald	Mackenzie Elias		St. Adolphe CC, St. Adolphe, Manitoba
Kerri Einarson	Val Sweeting	Shannon Birchard	Karlee Burgess	Krysten Karwacki	Gimli CC, Gimli, Manitoba
Rachel Homan	Tracy Fleury	Emma Miskew	Sarah Wilkes	Rachelle Brown	Ottawa CC, Ottawa, Ontario
Kaitlyn Lawes (Fourth)	Selena Njegovan (Skip)	Jocelyn Peterman	Kristin Gordon	Laura Walker	Heather CC, Winnipeg, Manitoba
Beth Peterson	Kelsey Calvert	Katherine Remillard	Melissa Gordon-Kurz	Becca Hebert	Assiniboine Memorial CC, Winnipeg, Manitoba
Myla Plett	Alyssa Nedohin	Chloe Fediuk	Allie Iskiw	Abby Whitbread	Saville Community SC, Edmonton, Alberta & Sherwood Park CC, Sherwood Park
Kayla Skrlik	Margot Flemming	Ashton Skrlik	Geri-Lynn Ramsay	Crystal Rumberg	Garrison CC, Calgary, Alberta
Selena Sturmay	Danielle Schmiemann	Dezaray Hawes	Paige Papley		Saville Community SC, Edmonton, Alberta

=== Round robin standings ===
Final Round Robin Standings

Key
Teams to Final

Pool A
Skip	W	SOW	SOL	L	PF	PA	EW	EL	BE	SE	Pts
(Ontario) Rachel Homan	4	0	0	0	37	18	19	14	1	6	12
(Manitoba) Beth Peterson	2	0	0	2	30	28	18	20	1	6	6
(Manitoba) Kaitlyn Lawes	2	0	0	2	26	25	16	16	1	4	6
(Alberta) Myla Plett	1	0	0	3	22	35	15	19	1	3	3
(Nova Scotia) Christina Black	1	0	0	3	21	30	18	17	0	5	3

Pool B
Skip	W	SOW	SOL	L	PF	PA	EW	EL	BE	SE	Pts
(British Columbia) Corryn Brown	4	0	0	0	42	20	22	13	0	10	12
(Manitoba) Kerri Einarson	3	0	0	1	34	22	17	14	1	7	9
(Alberta) Selena Sturmay	2	0	0	2	21	30	15	18	1	6	6
(Manitoba) Kate Cameron	1	0	0	3	24	33	15	20	0	3	3
(Alberta) Kayla Skrlik	0	0	0	4	22	38	15	19	2	3	0

=== Round robin results ===
All draw times are listed in Mountain Time (UTC−07:00).

==== Draw 1 ====
Wednesday, October 1, 1:30 pm

Sheet A	1	2	3	4	5	6	7	8	9	10	Final
(Manitoba) Kate Cameron	0	0	2	0	2	0	5	0	2	0	11
(Alberta) Kayla Skrlik 🔨	0	1	0	2	0	2	0	3	0	1	9

Sheet D	1	2	3	4	5	6	7	8	9	10	Final
(Manitoba) Beth Peterson 🔨	0	2	0	0	3	1	1	1	0	0	8
(Alberta) Myla Plett	0	0	1	3	0	0	0	0	2	1	7

Sheet E	1	2	3	4	5	6	7	8	9	10	Final
(British Columbia) Corryn Brown	0	3	2	0	2	0	1	1	X	X	9
(Alberta) Selena Sturmay 🔨	1	0	0	2	0	1	0	0	X	X	4

==== Draw 2 ====
Wednesday, October 1, 6:30 pm

Sheet B	1	2	3	4	5	6	7	8	9	10	Final
(Manitoba) Kerri Einarson 🔨	0	0	0	4	0	0	1	0	X	X	5
(British Columbia) Corryn Brown	2	1	1	0	4	1	0	4	X	X	13

Sheet C	1	2	3	4	5	6	7	8	9	10	Final
(Manitoba) Kaitlyn Lawes	0	1	2	0	0	2	2	0	1	X	8
(Nova Scotia) Christina Black 🔨	1	0	0	1	0	0	0	1	0	X	3

Sheet E	1	2	3	4	5	6	7	8	9	10	Final
(Ontario) Rachel Homan	1	0	1	0	3	1	1	0	0	1	8
(Manitoba) Beth Peterson 🔨	0	1	0	3	0	0	0	1	1	0	6

==== Draw 3 ====
Thursday, October 2, 1:30 pm

Sheet A	1	2	3	4	5	6	7	8	9	10	Final
(Alberta) Myla Plett 🔨	2	0	1	1	0	1	0	2	0	1	8
(Nova Scotia) Christina Black	0	2	0	0	1	0	1	0	1	0	5

Sheet C	1	2	3	4	5	6	7	8	9	10	Final
(Manitoba) Kerri Einarson	1	0	1	0	2	0	2	2	X	X	8
(Manitoba) Kate Cameron 🔨	0	1	0	1	0	1	0	0	X	X	3

Sheet D	1	2	3	4	5	6	7	8	9	10	Final
(Alberta) Selena Sturmay 🔨	0	1	0	3	0	2	0	1	0	0	7
(Alberta) Kayla Skrlik	1	0	1	0	2	0	0	0	1	1	6

==== Draw 4 ====
Thursday, October 2, 6:30 pm

Sheet B	1	2	3	4	5	6	7	8	9	10	Final
(Ontario) Rachel Homan 🔨	1	1	0	1	0	2	0	3	X	X	8
(Manitoba) Kaitlyn Lawes	0	0	1	0	1	0	1	0	X	X	3

==== Draw 5 ====
Friday, October 3, 1:30 pm

Sheet A	1	2	3	4	5	6	7	8	9	10	Final
(Alberta) Selena Sturmay	0	0	0	1	1	0	0	2	X	X	4
(Manitoba) Kerri Einarson 🔨	3	2	1	0	0	1	4	0	X	X	11

Sheet B	1	2	3	4	5	6	7	8	9	10	Final
(Nova Scotia) Christina Black	1	0	1	1	0	2	1	0	1	1	8
(Manitoba) Beth Peterson 🔨	0	1	0	0	2	0	0	2	0	0	5

Sheet D	1	2	3	4	5	6	7	8	9	10	Final
(British Columbia) Corryn Brown 🔨	1	0	2	0	3	1	0	0	0	3	10
(Manitoba) Kate Cameron	0	1	0	1	0	0	1	2	1	0	6

Sheet E	1	2	3	4	5	6	7	8	9	10	Final
(Manitoba) Kaitlyn Lawes 🔨	2	0	0	2	3	0	2	1	X	X	10
(Alberta) Myla Plett	0	0	2	0	0	1	0	0	X	X	3

==== Draw 6 ====
Friday, October 3, 6:30 pm

Sheet B	1	2	3	4	5	6	7	8	9	10	Final
(Manitoba) Kate Cameron 🔨	0	0	0	2	0	1	0	0	1	X	4
(Alberta) Selena Sturmay	1	2	1	0	0	0	1	1	0	X	6

Sheet C	1	2	3	4	5	6	7	8	9	10	Final
(Alberta) Myla Plett 🔨	2	0	1	0	0	1	0	0	X	X	4
(Ontario) Rachel Homan	0	1	0	2	2	0	6	1	X	X	12

==== Draw 7 ====
Saturday, October 4, 1:30 pm

Sheet A	1	2	3	4	5	6	7	8	9	10	Final
(Manitoba) Beth Peterson 🔨	1	0	1	0	2	4	1	0	2	X	11
(Manitoba) Kaitlyn Lawes	0	1	0	3	0	0	0	1	0	X	5

Sheet C	1	2	3	4	5	6	7	8	9	10	Final
(Alberta) Kayla Skrlik	0	1	0	0	0	0	2	2	0	X	5
(British Columbia) Corryn Brown 🔨	3	0	1	2	2	1	0	0	1	X	10

==== Draw 8 ====
Saturday, October 4, 6:30 pm

Sheet D	1	2	3	4	5	6	7	8	9	10	Final
(Nova Scotia) Christina Black	0	1	0	1	0	2	0	1	X	X	5
(Ontario) Rachel Homan 🔨	0	0	1	0	5	0	3	0	X	X	9

Sheet E	1	2	3	4	5	6	7	8	9	10	Final
(Alberta) Kayla Skrlik	0	0	1	0	0	1	0	0	X	X	2
(Manitoba) Kerri Einarson 🔨	0	2	0	2	1	0	2	3	X	X	10

=== Final ===
Sunday, October 5, 11:00 am

Sheet C	1	2	3	4	5	6	7	8	9	10	Final
(Ontario) Rachel Homan 🔨	0	0	1	1	1	0	2	0	1	X	6
(British Columbia) Corryn Brown	0	0	0	0	0	1	0	1	0	X	2

Player percentages
(Ontario) Team Homan		(British Columbia) Team Brown	
Sarah Wilkes	69%	Samantha Fisher	92%
Emma Miskew	83%	Sarah Koltun	72%
Tracy Fleury	75%	Erin Pincott	71%
Rachel Homan	86%	Corryn Brown	78%
Total	78%	Total	78%
