= 2024 PointsBet Invitational =

- Host city: Calgary, Alberta
- Arena: Markin MacPhail Centre, Canada Olympic Park
- Dates: September 25–29
- Men's winner: (Saskatchewan) Team McEwen
- Curling club: Nutana CC, Saskatoon
- Skip: Mike McEwen
- Third: Colton Flasch
- Second: Kevin Marsh
- Lead: Dan Marsh
- Coach: Brent Laing
- Finalist: (Newfoundland and Labrador) Brad Gushue
- Women's winner: (Ontario) Team Homan
- Curling club: Ottawa CC, Ottawa
- Skip: Rachel Homan
- Third: Tracy Fleury
- Second: Emma Miskew
- Lead: Sarah Wilkes
- Alternate: Rachelle Brown
- Coach: Brendan Bottcher
- Finalist: (Alberta) Kayla Skrlik

The 2024 PointsBet Invitational curling tournament was held from September 25 to 29 at the Markin MacPhail Centre at Canada Olympic Park in Calgary, Alberta. The event featured thirty-two Canadian teams and was the first major event of the 2024–25 season. It was played in a single-elimination tournament with the winning team on both the men's and women's sides receiving $50,000 each.

== Qualification ==
The top 10 ranked men's and women's 2023–24 CTRS standings qualified for the event first. The 2024 Alberta men's and women's champions also qualified. Additionally, the reigning men's and women's champions of the 2024 Canadian Junior Curling Championships, the 2024 CCAA/Curling Canada College Curling Championships, the 2024 U Sports/Curling Canada University Curling Championships, the 2024 U25 NextGen Classic and the 2023 Canadian Curling Club Championships received a berth to round out the field.

=== Men ===
Top CTRS men's teams:

1. (Newfoundland and Labrador) Brad Gushue
2. (Alberta) Brad Jacobs (Note: Formerly Team Brendan Bottcher.)
3. (Saskatchewan) Mike McEwen
4. (Manitoba) Matt Dunstone
5. (Alberta) Kevin Koe
6. (Manitoba) Reid Carruthers
7. (Alberta) ~~Aaron Sluchinski~~
8. (Saskatchewan) Rylan Kleiter
9. (Alberta) ~~Karsten Sturmay~~
10. (Ontario) ~~John Epping~~
11. (Ontario) Sam Mooibroek
12. (Ontario) ~~Glenn Howard~~
13. (Nova Scotia) Owen Purcell
14. (Manitoba) ~~Ryan Wiebe~~
15. (British Columbia) ~~Catlin Schneider~~
16. (Quebec) Félix Asselin

Alberta champions:

- (Alberta) Aaron Sluchinski

Junior champions:

- (Alberta) Kenan Wipf

CCAA champions:

- (Ontario) Jacob Horgan (Note: Formerly Team Jacob Dobson.)

U Sport champions:

- (Saskatchewan) Josh Bryden

U25 NextGen champions:

- (Manitoba) Jordon McDonald

Club champions:

- (Alberta) Dan Sherrard

=== Women ===
Top CTRS women's teams:

1. (Ontario) Rachel Homan
2. (Manitoba) Chelsea Carey (Note: Formerly Team Jennifer Jones.)
3. (Manitoba) Kerri Einarson
4. (Manitoba) Kaitlyn Lawes
5. (Alberta) ~~Selena Sturmay~~
6. (Manitoba) Kate Cameron
7. (Ontario) Danielle Inglis
8. (British Columbia) Corryn Brown
9. (Alberta) ~~Serena Gray-Withers~~
10. (Alberta) Kayla Skrlik
11. (Saskatchewan) Jolene Campbell
12. (Saskatchewan) Ashley Thevenot (Note: Formerly Team Skylar Ackerman.)

Alberta champions:

- (Alberta) Selena Sturmay

Junior champions:

- (Nova Scotia) Allyson MacNutt

CCAA champions:

- (Alberta) Gabby Wood

U Sport champions:

- (Alberta) Serena Gray-Withers

U25 NextGen champions:

- (British Columbia) Taylor Reese-Hansen

Club champions:

- (New Brunswick) Abby Burgess

== Men ==
=== Teams ===
The teams are listed as follows:

Skip	Third	Second	Lead	Alternate	Locale
Félix Asselin	Jean-Michel Ménard	Martin Crête	Jean-François Trépanier		Dollard-des-Ormeaux, Salaberry-de-Valleyfield, Saint-Romuald & Chelsea, Quebec
Josh Bryden	Adam Bukurak	Carter Williamson	Ryan Grabarczyk	Ayden Wittmire	Regina, Saskatchewan
Reid Carruthers	Catlin Schneider	Derek Samagalski	Connor Njegovan		Winnipeg, Manitoba
Matt Dunstone	B. J. Neufeld	Colton Lott	Ryan Harnden		Winnipeg, Manitoba
Brad Gushue	Mark Nichols	E. J. Harnden	Geoff Walker		St. John's, Newfoundland and Labrador
Jacob Horgan	Jacob Dobson	Noah Garner	Matthew Abrams	Zack Shurtleff	Toronto, Ontario
Brad Jacobs	Marc Kennedy	Brett Gallant	Ben Hebert	Paul Webster	Calgary, Alberta
Rylan Kleiter	Joshua Mattern	Matthew Hall	Trevor Johnson		Saskatoon, Saskatchewan
Kevin Koe	Tyler Tardi	– (Note: Team Koe played with three players.)	Karrick Martin		Calgary, Alberta
Jordon McDonald	Dallas Burgess	Elias Huminicki	Cameron Olafson	William Lyburn	Winnipeg, Manitoba
Mike McEwen	Colton Flasch	Kevin Marsh	Dan Marsh		Saskatoon, Saskatchewan
Sam Mooibroek	Ryan Wiebe	Scott Mitchell	Nathan Steele		Whitby, Ontario
Owen Purcell	Luke Saunders	Scott Saccary	Ryan Abraham		Halifax, Nova Scotia
Dan Sherrard	Brandon Klassen	Shawn Donnelly	Kyle Reynolds		Edmonton, Alberta
Aaron Sluchinski	Jeremy Harty	Kyle Doering	Dylan Webster		Airdrie, Alberta
Kenan Wipf	Ky Macaulay	Michael Keenan	Max Cinnamon		Calgary, Alberta

=== Knockout Brackets ===
Sweep 16
1	(Newfoundland and Labrador) Brad Gushue	12
16	(Alberta) Dan Sherrard	4
8	(Saskatchewan) Rylan Kleiter	5
9	(Ontario) Sam Mooibroek	2
5	(Alberta) Kevin Koe	8
12	(Saskatchewan) Josh Bryden	4
4	(Manitoba) Matt Dunstone	5
13	(Manitoba) Jordon McDonald	8
6	(Manitoba) Reid Carruthers	4
11	(Quebec) Félix Asselin	5
3	(Saskatchewan) Mike McEwen	11
14	(Alberta) Kenan Wipf	3
7	(Alberta) Aaron Sluchinski	6
10	(Nova Scotia) Owen Purcell	11
2	(Alberta) Brad Jacobs	9
15	(Ontario) Jacob Horgan	2

Elite 8
1	(Newfoundland and Labrador) Brad Gushue	10
8	(Saskatchewan) Rylan Kleiter	4
5	(Alberta) Kevin Koe	4
13	(Manitoba) Jordon McDonald	8
11	(Quebec) Félix Asselin	3
3	(Saskatchewan) Mike McEwen	10
10	(Nova Scotia) Owen Purcell	2
2	(Alberta) Brad Jacobs	6

Final 4
1	(Newfoundland and Labrador) Brad Gushue	9
13	(Manitoba) Jordon McDonald	7
3	(Saskatchewan) Mike McEwen	10
2	(Alberta) Brad Jacobs	3

Final
1	(Newfoundland and Labrador) Brad Gushue	3
3	(Saskatchewan) Mike McEwen	8

=== Knockout Results ===
All draw times are listed in Mountain Time (UTC−07:00).

==== Sweep 16 ====
Wednesday, September 25, 6:00 pm

Sheet A	1	2	3	4	5	6	7	8	9	10	Final
(Manitoba) Matt Dunstone	0	0	0	2	0	2	0	1	0	0	5
(Manitoba) Jordon McDonald 🔨	0	0	0	0	3	0	2	0	1	2	8

Sheet B	1	2	3	4	5	6	7	8	9	10	Final
(Alberta) Kevin Koe 🔨	0	2	0	0	3	0	2	1	0	X	8
(Saskatchewan) Josh Bryden	0	0	1	1	0	1	0	0	1	X	4

Sheet C	1	2	3	4	5	6	7	8	9	10	Final
(Newfoundland and Labrador) Brad Gushue	2	1	0	2	1	1	0	2	3	X	12
(Alberta) Dan Sherrard 🔨	0	0	2	0	0	0	2	0	0	X	4

Sheet D	1	2	3	4	5	6	7	8	9	10	Final
(Saskatchewan) Rylan Kleiter 🔨	0	1	0	0	0	1	0	0	2	1	5
(Ontario) Sam Mooibroek	0	0	1	0	0	0	1	0	0	0	2

Thursday, September 26, 6:00 pm

Sheet A	1	2	3	4	5	6	7	8	9	10	11	Final
(Manitoba) Reid Carruthers	0	1	0	0	0	0	0	1	0	2	0	4
(Quebec) Félix Asselin 🔨	1	0	0	0	0	1	0	0	2	0	1	5

Sheet B	1	2	3	4	5	6	7	8	9	10	Final
(Saskatchewan) Mike McEwen 🔨	0	2	2	0	4	0	3	0	X	X	11
(Alberta) Kenan Wipf	0	0	0	1	0	1	0	1	X	X	3

Sheet C	1	2	3	4	5	6	7	8	9	10	Final
(Alberta) Brad Jacobs 🔨	2	1	0	2	0	0	0	4	X	X	9
(Ontario) Jacob Horgan	0	0	0	0	1	0	1	0	X	X	2

Sheet D	1	2	3	4	5	6	7	8	9	10	Final
(Alberta) Aaron Sluchinski 🔨	2	0	1	0	0	2	1	0	0	0	6
(Nova Scotia) Owen Purcell	0	3	0	2	0	0	0	3	0	3	11

==== Elite 8 ====
Friday, September 27, 8:00 pm

Sheet A	1	2	3	4	5	6	7	8	9	10	Final
(Nova Scotia) Owen Purcell	0	1	0	0	0	0	0	1	0	X	2
(Alberta) Brad Jacobs 🔨	2	0	0	0	1	1	0	0	2	X	6

Sheet B	1	2	3	4	5	6	7	8	9	10	Final
(Newfoundland and Labrador) Brad Gushue 🔨	2	0	2	2	2	0	2	0	X	X	10
(Saskatchewan) Rylan Kleiter	0	1	0	0	0	1	0	2	X	X	4

Sheet C	1	2	3	4	5	6	7	8	9	10	Final
(Quebec) Félix Asselin	0	0	0	0	1	0	2	0	X	X	3
(Saskatchewan) Mike McEwen 🔨	0	0	1	3	0	4	0	2	X	X	10

Sheet D	1	2	3	4	5	6	7	8	9	10	Final
(Alberta) Kevin Koe	0	2	0	0	1	1	0	0	0	X	4
(Manitoba) Jordon McDonald 🔨	2	0	1	2	0	0	0	2	1	X	8

==== Final 4 ====
Saturday, September 28, 8:00 pm

Sheet B	1	2	3	4	5	6	7	8	9	10	Final
(Saskatchewan) Mike McEwen	0	1	0	4	1	0	2	2	X	X	10
(Alberta) Brad Jacobs 🔨	1	0	1	0	0	1	0	0	X	X	3

Sheet C	1	2	3	4	5	6	7	8	9	10	Final
(Newfoundland and Labrador) Brad Gushue	0	2	0	3	0	1	0	1	1	1	9
(Manitoba) Jordon McDonald 🔨	1	0	3	0	2	0	1	0	0	0	7

==== Final ====
Sunday, September 29, 3:00 pm

Sheet C	1	2	3	4	5	6	7	8	9	10	Final
(Newfoundland and Labrador) Brad Gushue	0	1	1	0	0	0	0	1	X	X	3
(Saskatchewan) Mike McEwen 🔨	4	0	0	0	0	3	1	0	X	X	8

Player percentages
(Newfoundland and Labrador) Team Gushue		(Saskatchewan) Team McEwen	
Geoff Walker	95%	Dan Marsh	95%
E. J. Harnden	75%	Kevin Marsh	91%
Mark Nichols	88%	Colton Flasch	83%
Brad Gushue	72%	Mike McEwen	83%
Total	82%	Total	88%

== Women ==
=== Teams ===
The teams are listed as follows:

Skip	Third	Second	Lead	Alternate	Locale
Corryn Brown	Erin Pincott	Sarah Koltun	Samantha Fisher		Kamloops, British Columbia
Abby Burgess	Brooke Tracy	Samantha Crook	Hannah Williams		Oromocto, New Brunswick
Kate Cameron	Taylor McDonald	Brianna Cullen	Mackenzie Elias		St. Adolphe, Manitoba
Jolene Campbell	Abby Ackland	Rachel Erickson	Dayna Demmans		Regina, Saskatchewan
Chelsea Carey	Karlee Burgess	Emily Zacharias	Lauren Lenentine		Winnipeg, Manitoba
Kerri Einarson	Val Sweeting	Laura Walker (Note: Laura Walker replaced Shannon Birchard who was recovering from a knee injury.)	Krysten Karwacki		Gimli, Manitoba
Serena Gray-Withers	Catherine Clifford	Lindsey Burgess	Zoe Cinnamon		Edmonton, Alberta
Rachel Homan	Tracy Fleury	Emma Miskew	Sarah Wilkes	Rachelle Brown	Ottawa, Ontario
Danielle Inglis	Kira Brunton	Calissa Daly	Cassandra de Groot		Ottawa, Ontario
Kaitlyn Lawes	Selena Njegovan	Jocelyn Peterman	Kristin Gordon	Becca Hebert	Winnipeg, Manitoba
Allyson MacNutt	Maria Fitzgerald	Alison Umlah	Grace McCusker		Halifax, Nova Scotia
Taylor Reese-Hansen	Megan McGillivray	Kim Bonneau	Julianna Mackenzie		Victoria, British Columbia
Kayla Skrlik	Margot Flemming	Geri-Lynn Ramsay	Ashton Skrlik	Crystal Webster	Calgary, Alberta
Selena Sturmay	Danielle Schmiemann	Dezaray Hawes	Paige Papley		Edmonton, Alberta
Ashley Thevenot	Brittany Tran	Taylor Stremick	Kaylin Skinner		Saskatoon, Saskatchewan
Gabby Wood	Payton Sonnenberg	Brenna Bilassy	Rachel Jost		Edmonton, Alberta

=== Knockout Brackets ===
Sweep 16
1	(Ontario) Rachel Homan	11
16	(Alberta) Gabby Wood	2
8	(British Columbia) Corryn Brown	8
9	(Alberta) Serena Gray-Withers	4
5	(Alberta) Selena Sturmay	8
12	(Saskatchewan) Ashley Thevenot	7
4	(Manitoba) Kaitlyn Lawes	5
13	(British Columbia) Taylor Reese-Hansen	2
6	(Manitoba) Kate Cameron	8
11	(Saskatchewan) Jolene Campbell	5
3	(Manitoba) Kerri Einarson	6
14	(Nova Scotia) Allyson MacNutt	8
7	(Ontario) Danielle Inglis	2
10	(Alberta) Kayla Skrlik	9
2	(Manitoba) Chelsea Carey	10
15	(New Brunswick) Abby Burgess	4

Elite 8
1	(Ontario) Rachel Homan	8
8	(British Columbia) Corryn Brown	4
5	(Alberta) Selena Sturmay	4
4	(Manitoba) Kaitlyn Lawes	6
6	(Manitoba) Kate Cameron	12
14	(Nova Scotia) Allyson MacNutt	3
10	(Alberta) Kayla Skrlik	8
2	(Manitoba) Chelsea Carey	6

Final 4
1	(Ontario) Rachel Homan	10
4	(Manitoba) Kaitlyn Lawes	5
6	(Manitoba) Kate Cameron	4
10	(Alberta) Kayla Skrlik	10

Final
1	(Ontario) Rachel Homan	8
10	(Alberta) Kayla Skrlik	3

=== Knockout Results ===
All draw times are listed in Mountain Time (UTC−07:00).

==== Sweep 16 ====
Wednesday, September 25, 1:00 pm

Sheet A	1	2	3	4	5	6	7	8	9	10	Final
(Manitoba) Kaitlyn Lawes 🔨	2	0	0	1	0	0	0	1	1	X	5
(British Columbia) Taylor Reese-Hansen	0	0	1	0	0	0	1	0	0	X	2

Sheet B	1	2	3	4	5	6	7	8	9	10	Final
(Alberta) Selena Sturmay 🔨	3	0	1	0	0	2	1	0	1	0	8
(Saskatchewan) Ashley Thevenot	0	1	0	2	0	0	0	2	0	2	7

Sheet C	1	2	3	4	5	6	7	8	9	10	Final
(Ontario) Rachel Homan 🔨	0	4	0	1	4	0	2	0	X	X	11
(Alberta) Gabby Wood	0	0	0	0	0	1	0	1	X	X	2

Sheet D	1	2	3	4	5	6	7	8	9	10	Final
(British Columbia) Corryn Brown 🔨	0	1	1	3	0	1	0	1	1	X	8
(Alberta) Serena Gray-Withers	1	0	0	0	1	0	2	0	0	X	4

Thursday, September 26, 1:00 pm

Sheet A	1	2	3	4	5	6	7	8	9	10	Final
(Manitoba) Kate Cameron 🔨	1	0	1	3	0	1	0	0	1	1	8
(Saskatchewan) Jolene Campbell	0	0	0	0	3	0	1	1	0	0	5

Sheet B	1	2	3	4	5	6	7	8	9	10	Final
(Manitoba) Kerri Einarson 🔨	1	0	1	0	3	1	0	0	0	0	6
(Nova Scotia) Allyson MacNutt	0	1	0	3	0	0	2	1	0	1	8

Sheet C	1	2	3	4	5	6	7	8	9	10	Final
(Manitoba) Chelsea Carey 🔨	3	0	1	1	0	2	3	0	X	X	10
(New Brunswick) Abby Burgess	0	1	0	0	2	0	0	1	X	X	4

Sheet D	1	2	3	4	5	6	7	8	9	10	Final
(Ontario) Danielle Inglis	0	1	0	0	1	0	0	0	X	X	2
(Alberta) Kayla Skrlik 🔨	0	0	2	1	0	2	3	1	X	X	9

==== Elite 8 ====
Friday, September 27, 1:00 pm

Sheet A	1	2	3	4	5	6	7	8	9	10	Final
(Alberta) Kayla Skrlik 🔨	3	0	2	1	0	1	0	1	0	0	8
(Manitoba) Chelsea Carey	0	2	0	0	1	0	1	0	1	1	6

Sheet B	1	2	3	4	5	6	7	8	9	10	Final
(Ontario) Rachel Homan 🔨	0	2	0	2	0	1	0	1	0	2	8
(British Columbia) Corryn Brown	0	0	2	0	0	0	1	0	1	0	4

Sheet C	1	2	3	4	5	6	7	8	9	10	Final
(Manitoba) Kate Cameron 🔨	2	2	2	0	2	4	0	0	X	X	12
(Nova Scotia) Allyson MacNutt	0	0	0	1	0	0	1	1	X	X	3

Sheet D	1	2	3	4	5	6	7	8	9	10	Final
(Alberta) Selena Sturmay	0	0	0	0	2	0	1	1	0	0	4
(Manitoba) Kaitlyn Lawes 🔨	0	2	1	1	0	1	0	0	1	0	6

==== Final 4 ====
Saturday, September 28, 1:00 pm

Sheet B	1	2	3	4	5	6	7	8	9	10	Final
(Manitoba) Kate Cameron 🔨	0	1	1	0	0	1	0	1	0	X	4
(Alberta) Kayla Skrlik	1	0	0	1	1	0	3	0	4	X	10

Sheet C	1	2	3	4	5	6	7	8	9	10	Final
(Ontario) Rachel Homan 🔨	0	3	0	2	0	0	0	2	0	3	10
(Manitoba) Kaitlyn Lawes	0	0	1	0	2	0	2	0	0	0	5

==== Final ====
Sunday, September 29, 10:00 am

Sheet C	1	2	3	4	5	6	7	8	9	10	Final
(Ontario) Rachel Homan 🔨	1	1	1	0	0	2	3	0	X	X	8
(Alberta) Kayla Skrlik	0	0	0	2	0	0	0	1	X	X	3

Player percentages
(Ontario) Team Homan		(Alberta) Team Skrlik	
Sarah Wilkes	100%	Geri-Lynn Ramsay	84%
Emma Miskew	94%	Ashton Skrlik	89%
Tracy Fleury	84%	Margot Flemming	78%
Rachel Homan	95%	Kayla Skrlik	72%
Total	93%	Total	81%
