= Ed Craven =

Australian businessman (born 1996)

Edward Craven
- Born: July 17, 1995 (age 31)
- Occupation: Businessman
- Known for: Co-founder of Stake and Kick

Edward Craven (born 1995) is an Australian billionaire entrepreneur. He is known as the co-founder of the online casino Stake and the live-streaming platform Kick, where Craven also streams.

== Early life ==
From Melbourne, Australia, Craven was born in 1995. His father, Jamie Craven, was banned from working in the financial services industry and jailed for six months in the 1980s over the collapse of investment company Spedley Securities. His mother, Verena Marie Macarthur-Onslow is a member of the Macarthur family of graziers. Little is publicly known about Craven's upbringing or education, although he did attend Bishop Druitt College where he developed an early interest in technology, online gaming, and cryptocurrencies. According to Craven, he won $6,000 on a family cruise at age 12, which gave him a fascination with the statistics of the gambling industry. During his teenage years, he became active in online communities centered around virtual games and gambling, particularly within the game RuneScape.

== Career ==
After experimenting with virtual gambling in RuneScape, Craven and Bijan Tehrani created Primedice, a cryptocurrency-based online dice game in 2013. In 2016, they launched Easygo, a company specializing in online casino games. Until the end of 2021, Craven was known publicly only as "Edd Miroslav."

=== Stake ===
The brand Stake debuted in 2017. Operating through a license in Curaçao, the company opened offices in Serbia, Australia, and Cyprus, becoming one of the world's largest gambling companies. Stake expanded to the UK in December 2021 through a partnership with TGP Europe. It is the main shirt sponsor for Everton FC and Watford FC, and also backs the Sauber Formula One team. In 2022, Canadian musician Drake was paid US$100 million annually to endorse Stake on social media.

In September 2023, the FBI confirmed that the Lazarus Group, a North Korean cybercrime organization linked to over US$300 million in cryptocurrency thefts in 2023, had stolen approximately US$41 million in cryptocurrency from Stake.

In May 2024, Craven and his business partner, Bijan Tehrani, increased their stake in ASX-listed bookmaker PointsBet to over 5% through their company, Easygo Gaming. In August 2025, it was reported that Craven had backed Mixi's offer to acquire PointsBet, in a $421 million bid. Craven, through Easygo Entertainment, already controlled 5% of PointsBet.

In early 2024, Stake, partnered with Canberra-based Racing and Sports Technology to begin offering horse racing bets. In February 2024, Stake became a sponsor of Formula 1 by rebranding the Sauber team as the "Stake F1 Team." In August 2024, Stake expanded into the Italian market by acquiring Baldo Line SRL, the operator of Idealbet.it, thereby enhancing its European presence. In March 2025, Craven announced a strategic shift for Stake, transitioning from a cryptocurrency-exclusive platform to accepting 70% of transactions in traditional fiat currency. Stake in early 2025 was registered in Curaçao, but run from Melbourne, where its services were not legal for Australians. Stake.com left the UK in early 2025, after it was cautioned by the UK gambling regulator over videos by an adult content creator. In April 2025, Stake was sued in California over allegedly illegally operating a "social casino" in the state.

In June 2024, Craven's company Easygo Solutions owned both the Stake and Kick platforms. That month, it began offering sign-on bonuses of up to A$100,000 to attract senior engineering talent, aiming to recruit from tech firms such as Atlassian, Canva, Microsoft, Amazon, Google, and Xero.

=== Kick ===
Kick was launched in 2022 by Craven and his business partner, Tehrani, with the intention of competing with Amazon's Twitch as an online live-streaming platform. Unlike Twitch, which offers a 50/50 revenue split for most affiliates and partners, Kick provides a 95-5% split of revenues to content creators. Kick's sponsorships include the Sauber F1 Team and Everton Football Club. In May 2024, Craven addressed concerns from streamers about the platform's moderation being worse than Twitch, noting Kick was working to balance content regulation and community feedback.

=== Other ventures ===
As of May 2024, Craven and Tehrani own more than 5% of the ASX-listed online bookmaker PointsBet through Easygo.

Craven is also an investor in Australian AI technology company Maincode, of which as of August 2025 he was majority investor. Maincode's parent company, MCECTech, has Craven as its sole shareholder. In August 2025, Maincode revealed its flagship platform Matilda, which was to be Australia's first "sovereign large language model, trained on Australian data."

Easygo Solutions, Craven's private investment vehicle, had revenues of over $500 million in the 2024 financial year. It had profits that year of $260 million, and held $405 million in cryptocurrencies. At the time, Craven was also director of Easygo Group Holdings, held along with Tehrani.

== Personal life ==
Craven resides in Melbourne and in 2022 he purchased a 7,187-square-metre (77,360 sq ft) derelict mansion for A$80,000,088—the most expensive house in Toorak. Craven plans to construct a new luxury residence valued at approximately $150 million. Architect Paul Conrad noted that the design would be more akin to architectural styles from the US and UK than typical local. Also in 2023, he purchased a Toorak home for $38.5 million.

Craven plays online games and livestreams his gameplay on Kick. He has streamed alongside celebrities including Drake.

=== Net worth ===
In October 2024, Craven debuted on the Financial Review's Young Rich List, ranking 68th with a net worth of A$2.01 billion. At the same time, Forbes Australia highlighted Craven and Tehrani's US$5.6 billion fortune, built through Stake and Kick. In February 2025, the Financial Review reported his wealth at $4.51 billion. According to The Australian, he is the youngest Australian billionaire.

Year	Financial Review Rich List		Forbes Australia's 50 Richest		
Year	Rank	Net worth (A$)	Rank	Net worth (US$)	
2024	26 ▲	$4.51 billion ▲			
2025	32 ▼	$4.82 billion ▲			2026

Legend
Icon	Description
Steady	Has not changed from the previous year
▲	Has increased from the previous year
▼	Has decreased from the previous year
