= Arthur Macarthur-Onslow =

Francis Arthur Macarthur-Onslow (7 June 1879 – 3 March 1938) was an Australian grazier and real estate investor. After service in the South African War, he raised sheep, was a director of the Camden Park Estate and its associated dairy farm, and finally moved to Camden to invest in real estate and travel extensively.

== Life ==
Arthur, as he was known, was the sixth son of Arthur Alexander Walton Onslow and his wife Elizabeth. His elder siblings included George Macarthur-Onslow and James Macarthur-Onslow His father died in 1882, and his mother took him and his siblings to Europe in 1887 to be educated. Arthur attended Rugby School and Exeter College, Oxford.

On 29 April 1887, Macarthur-Onslow was commissioned into the New South Wales Mounted Rifles. He was promoted lieutenant in July 1899, and served in the South African War from 1900 to 1901 with the 7th Dragoon Guards. Macarthur-Onslow saw fighting at Johannesburg, Diamond Hill, and Bergendal before contracting rheumatic fever, from which he recovered in London.

Arthur returned to Australia in 1902. On 16 May 1903, he married Sylvia Seton Raymond Chisholm, by whom he had four children:

- Maj. Gen. Sir Denzil Macarthur-Onslow (1904–1984)
- Margaret Elizabeth Macarthur-Onslow (1905–1984), married Michael King in 1930, married John Sydney Davenport in 1960
- Lt. Col. Edward Macarthur-Onslow (1 October 1909 – 1980), aviator, father of Annette Macarthur-Onslow
- F/L Andrew William Macarthur-Onslow (1917–1943), killed in a flying accident near Tamworth

He went into the reserve of officers in 1907 and retired as a lieutenant in 1919.

In 1916, he began raising sheep at Macquarie Grove, and also became a director of Camden Park Estate Pty Ltd, Camden Vale Milk Co. and the Dairy Farmers' Co-operative Milk Co., the companies set up by his mother to administer the Camden Park Estate. He was mayor of Camden three times. After some time managing Camden Park, he retired to Camden and began a real-estate business. He also enjoyed horse racing, owning his own track and stud, and was a member of the Australian Jockey Club. Socially, he was a member of the Australian Club, of Sydney, and a Freemason.

Macarthur-Onslow died suddenly of a cerebral hemorrhage in Sydney on 3 March 1938.
