= Stake (online casino) =

Online casino

Stake.com
- Industry: Gambling
- Founded: 2017
- Headquarters: Curaçao
- Key people: Mladen Vučković (CEO)
- Website: stake.com

Stake is an Australian-Curaçaoan online casino. It is operated by Medium Rare N.V., a company incorporated in Curaçao, where it holds an online casino licence.

== History ==
In 2016, Ed Craven and Bijan Tehrani established Easygo, a company which developed games for online casinos. The two helped create Stake.com, which was founded in 2017. They also sponsored formula one team Alfa Romeo in 2023 and Sauber in 2024 and 2025. The company partnered with UFC to become an "official betting partner" in 2022.

== Offerings ==
Stake.com has become the biggest online Casino in the world and offers traditional casino games (such as slots, blackjack and roulette with or without live dealers). as well as sports betting and poker.

Users on Stake.com typically do not deal with traditional currencies, instead they deposit and withdraw cryptocurrencies to and from their betting account. Account balances can be withdrawn in the equivalent value of cryptocurrency and then deposited back into the user's personal cryptocurrency wallet. Users of Stake.com's UK site deal only in fiat currency.

== Licenses ==
In December 2021, Stake.com launched in the UK in partnership with TGP Europe. In 2023, Stake acquired Betfair Colombia after buying Idealbet in Italy in 2024. Peru was also launched by securing a license there. The expansion accelerated in 2025 when Stake got licensed in Brazil and bought Mocinoplay in Denmark. In the first half of 2026, Stake has already added Greenland and Mexico.

== Legal issues and controversies ==
=== Livestream sponsorships ===
On October 18, 2022, Twitch banned livestreams promoting unlicensed gambling sites. This decision came amidst controversy surrounding online casinos' sponsorships of popular livestreamers, including Stake's sponsorships of xQc and Trainwreckstv. These partnerships were criticized by the National Council on Problem Gambling as "illegal or unregulated" and posing "definite risks for consumers, vulnerable adults, and adolescents or underage children." Prior to the announcement of the updated gambling policy, streamer Pokimane had proposed a strike and boycott during the peak Christmas ad sales period to pressure Twitch to take action against gambling streams.

Ed Craven launched the livestreaming platform Kick in December 2022, two months after the Twitch gambling ban. Stake continued to sponsor livestreamers on Kick, including Adin Ross and Canadian rapper Drake. A 2026 Bloomberg Businessweek analysis of 1,500 hours of livestream footage from 25 Kick streamers reported that Drake achieved "big wins" of "1,000 times or more the base bet" on Stake at twice the rate of the second-luckiest player. Stake rejected the findings, calling them "categorically incorrect," and Craven has stated that Stake has "no direct control of the odds of any of our games."

==== Class action lawsuit ====
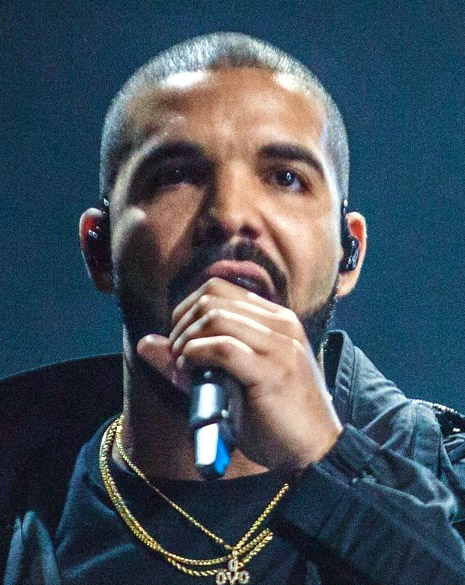
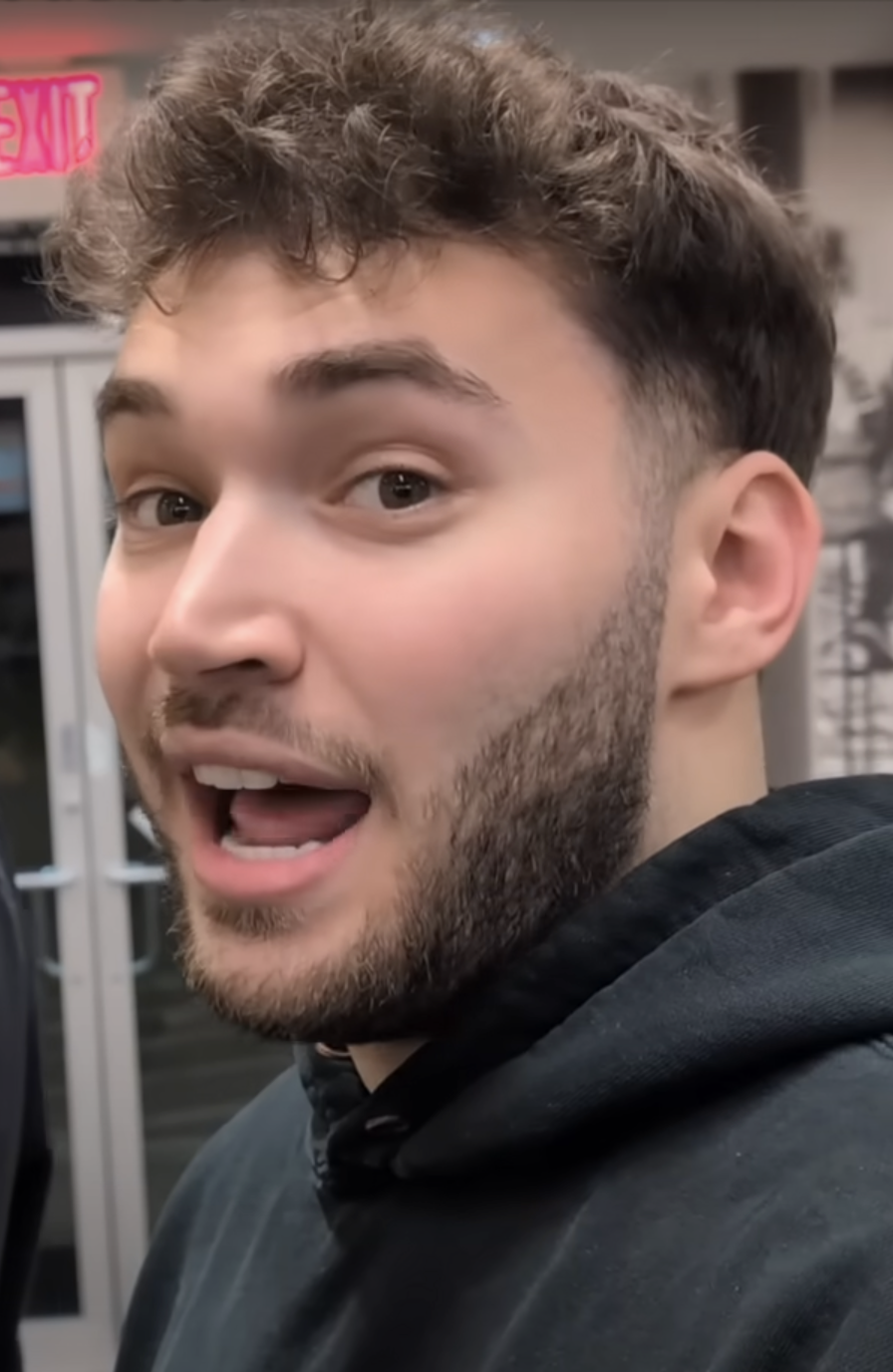
Rapper Drake and streamer Adin Ross were named as defendants in a class-action lawsuit that also targeted the US version of Stake

On December 31st, 2025, Sweepsteaks Ltd., the corporation responsible for operations of the Stake.us site, was named as a defendant in a class action RICO lawsuit alongside Drake and Adin Ross. The suit stated that Stake.us engaged in "deceptive" practices, enabling gambling with real money while claiming to act as a "social casino" in which only valueless tokens were exchanged; according to the suit, Stake's "Gold Coin" tokens were bundled with a "free bonus" of "Stake Cash" that could be wagered and exchange for US dollars. The suit also targeted the casino's streamer sponsorships, alleging that the streams were misleading as streamers were gambling with house money and therefore not facing real losses, and described Drake's association with Stake as "quietly corrosive" and "glamorizing the platform to millions of impressionable fans." It also accused Drake and Ross of engaging in a conspiracy to illegally promote Stake and "prey upon consumers" for personal gain. A Stake.us representative told Rolling Stone that the lawsuit was "a nonsense claim" about which the company was "not concerned."

On July 30th, 2026, US District Judge Leonie Brinkema ruled that an arbitration clause in Stake's user agreement required the dispute with Stake to be settled by a private arbitrator and halted the claims against the other defendants until the claim against Stake could be resolved.

=== Premier League sponsorships and UK gambling license ===
In summer 2022, Stake was announced as the front-of-shirt sponsor for Everton F.C. starting in the 2022–23 Premier League season.

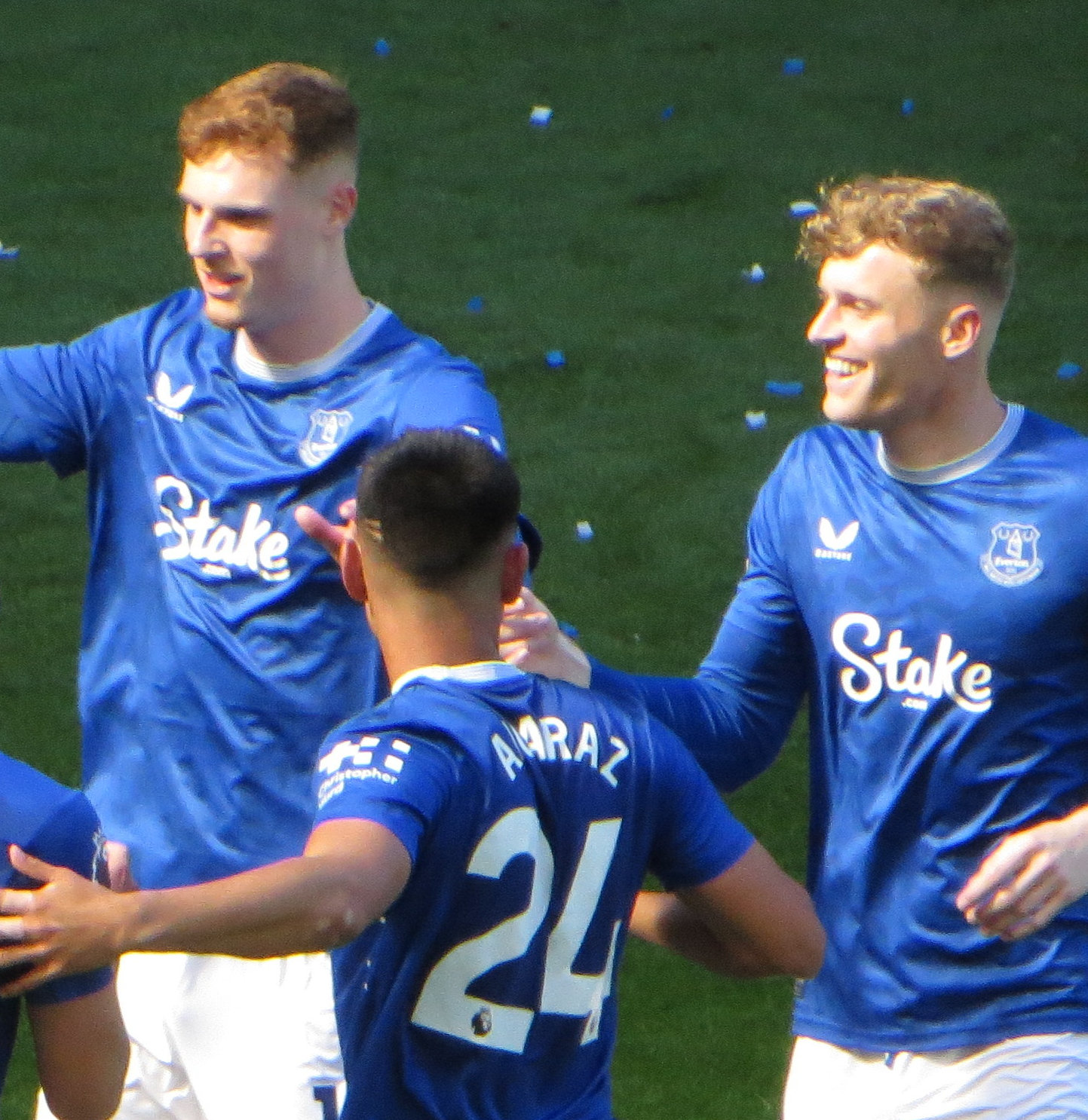
Everton F.C. players wearing Stake branded shirts in 2025

The following year, Stake engaged in talks with Chelsea F.C. to replace the team's expiring contract with Three and a proposed partnership with Paramount+ that had been blocked by the Premier League. The partnership was criticized by the team's fans; a survey of the Chelsea Supporters Trust showed 77% disapproval and the organization released a statement calling the deal "short-sighted" and "not in line with the commitment of growing Chelsea FC as a 'world class' organization." Following the negative reaction, Chelsea withdrew from negotiations.

In January 2025, The Guardian reported that the Advertising Standards Authority was investigating the casino for the use of Stake branding in unofficial advertisements online. One such advertisement, featuring pornographic actress Bonnie Blue, resulted in an investigation by the Gambling Commission. In February 2025, the Commission announced that Stake's local white-label operator TGP Europe had agreed to shut down the casino's UK website. Stake referred to the site's shuttering as a "strategic decision in mutual agreement with TGP Europe" to pivot to in-house management of operations in the UK market. The Commission warned Everton that "club officers may be liable to prosecution" for promoting an unlicensed gambling business.

Despite the Gambling Commission's warnings and plans by the Department for Digital, Culture, Media and Sport to ban football sponsorships by unlicensed gambling companies as soon as August 2027, Everton signed a new deal with Stake for the 2026–27 Premier League season. As the league's ban on front-of-shirt sponsorships by gambling companies came into effect that season, Stake's shirt sponsorship was replaced by CMC Markets and the casino became the team's sleeve sponsor.

=== Social media advertising ===
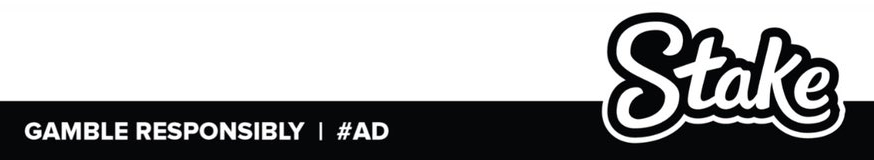
A variant of the Stake banner that appeared on posts on X

In late-2024, it was reported that Stake had partnered with a number of content aggregator accounts on X, which began reposting viral images and videos taken from other users with a watermark advertising Stake. The UK Advertising Standards Authority stated in October 2024 that it had been made aware of the advertising and was monitoring it.

The ads appeared to violate X's terms of service, which banned users from engaging in paid partnerships with gambling companies, and may have run afoul of advertising codes restricting the marketing of gambling products where minors may be present. The watermarks were satirized by social media users in posts featuring excessive numbers of Stake logos for comedic effect or Stake-style banners featuring logos of other companies.

=== Other ===
In April 2026, lawsuits alleging that Stake targeted children with gambling advertisements were filed in New York and Florida.

== See also ==
- Online gambling
- Cryptocurrency
- Return to player
