= Kick (service) =

Australian livestreaming site

- Screenshot Homepage as of November 2025
- Company type: Subsidiary
- Website type: Live streaming; Video on demand
- Headquarters: Melbourne, Victoria, Australia
- Area served: Worldwide
- Owners: Ashwood Holdings (50%); Bijan Tehrani (50%)
- Parent: Easygo Entertainment Pty Ltd
- Website: kick.com
- Advertising: No
- Commercial: Yes
- Registration: Optional
- Launched: December 2022 (3 years ago)
- Current status: Active
- Native clients on: Android, Android TV, iOS/iPadOS, tvOS, Web

Kick (also known as Kick.com) is an Australian video livestreaming service. It is operated by Kick Streaming Pty Ltd and backed by online casino company Stake and streaming personality Trainwreckstv. Kick was founded in 2022 as a competitor to Twitch, with a focus on looser moderation, higher revenue shares for streamers, and the inclusion of online gambling content which has been banned from other platforms. In 2023, Kick made multiple high-profile deals with streamers including Adin Ross and xQc. In Q3 2025, StreamCharts listed Kick.com as the fourth most watched livestreaming platform (among those monitored by the site) behind YouTube, TikTok, and Twitch. From 2023 until the end of 2025, Kick was also the sponsor of the Sauber Motorsport racing team in Formula One.

== Corporate structure ==
The Kick streaming platform had its inception in December 2022. To formalize its operations as a registered company in Australia, Kick Streaming Pty Ltd was established on 14 November of the same year. The sole shareholder of Kick Streaming is Easygo Entertainment Pty Ltd. Its parent company Easygo Entertainment was registered days prior on 8 November 2022.

In a July 2023 interview, CEO Ed Craven said Kick was not profitable. However, the company tentatively planned to become profitable through advertising in one to three years. In March 2025, Kick partnered with data analytics firm Streams Charts to launch the Kick Road Campaign, aiming to support emerging streamers with fewer than 100 concurrent viewers. The initiative offers a $50,000 prize pool, including a $20,000 grand prize for the streamer with the highest watch time. At the same time, Kick Dev opened its public API and introduced a $100,000 developer fund to encourage the creation of third-party tools that enhance the streaming experience.

== Controversies ==
=== Content moderation ===
Compared to its competitor Twitch, Kick has looser policies against copyright infringement, hate speech, gambling content, harassment, and sexual content. However, its community guidelines prohibit those behaviors, as well as doxing and violent conduct. A representative of the website said in March 2023 that the platform was in the process of expanding its moderation efforts and that it did not tolerate hate speech or copyright violations.

A New York Times article stated that some of the website's content creators have committed what appeared to be crimes, such as sexual assault and trespassing while streaming. Other content creators of the platform have had sex while streaming, brandished sex toys at children and made sexual remarks toward underage girls. After being banned from Twitch for what the streaming platform called "unmoderated hateful conduct on chat" in 2023, streamer Adin Ross migrated to Kick, where he livestreamed the Super Bowl, scrolled through Pornhub and invited white nationalist Nick Fuentes on a livestream. Kick streamer Hikaru Nakamura said that the platform was undergoing the same initial journey as other social media websites, including Twitch, which he said was "very much the Wild West" when it started. Nakamura further said that it usually takes time for such websites to adapt.

Kick has been called "a playground for people to be degenerate" by Kristin Gillespie, a co-founder of the New York-based Rights to Unmute, a not-for-profit organization that seeks to combat racism, bigotry, and harassment in gaming. She said in May 2024 that Kick has tolerated overly sexual and, sometimes, "predatory behavior" on the platform. The Sydney Morning Herald reported in October 2024 that "racist, homophobic and antisemitic hate speech, including Holocaust denial, has been allowed to spread freely" on the platform, while noting the lack of moderation of discriminatory user comments and emotes. The report also stated, citing three former staff members, that racial and homophobic slurs, including the N-word, were "part of the office culture" at Kick's Melbourne headquarters.

Kick CEO Ed Craven stated in an interview that "people are realizing [that] the more controversial they are, the more shock factor involved in their content, the more viewers they get, and it can sometimes be a dangerous mix in that regard". He further said that Kick was in the process of adapting and deciding what type of content it should deem acceptable. In late 2023, Kick content creators Ice Poseidon and Sam Pepper were detained by Australian police after an incident involving a man they had met earlier that day. They attempted to film the man and a sex worker, both of whom had consented to be filmed, engaging in sexual activity. The person meeting the woman pointed the camera out to her. She again consented to being filmed. Unbeknownst to the sex worker, she was being livestreamed by the camera. The interactions with the sex worker took place in a living room. After several minutes of the encounter, the woman then said she received a message from a friend who warned her the meeting was a set-up: Denino and fellow streamer Sam Pepper were hidden in an adjacent bedroom watching the stream. Ed Craven, founder and owner of the streaming platform Kick, was active in the stream chat while this was unfolding, sending laughing emotes. The woman attempted to leave the hotel room but was temporarily blocked by the third streamer. She then called she situation "creepy" and tried leaving again. The man insisted it was just them two and chased after her when she left. Later, Denino and Pepper exited the hotel and were apprehended by police officers. They were later released without charge. After the incident, some streamers considered leaving the platform with some vowing to leave. In response to the incident and backlash, Kick updated its guidelines, adding a report button for rule-breaking content and introducing regulations on staff participation in "high-risk" livestreams.

In late 2024, Kick implemented changes to its gambling policies to address concerns over harmful and exploitative content. Effective 1 February 2025, the platform permits gambling streams only from sites that use ID verification to ensure users are at least 18 years old.

=== Live death of a streamer ===
On the night of 17–18 August 2025, Jean Pormanove, whose real name was Raphaël Graven, died while streaming. Pormanove had been a target of repeated harassment, humiliation, and physical abuse live on stream by his two partners, identified as "Naruto" (real name Owen Cenazandotti) and Safine Hamadi. His streams were known for showing him regularly being subjected to mistreatment, with footage of the abuse broadcast to viewers for months.

A judicial investigation into the cause of his death was launched by the Nice public prosecutor's office. The events prompted official concern from the French government. Clara Chappaz, France's Minister Delegate for Digital, described the events as an "absolute horror" and referred the matter to the audiovisual regulator, ARCOM. On 20 August 2025, Kick announced that it had banned accounts: "All co-streamers who participated in this live broadcast have been banned pending the ongoing legal investigation" and assured that it had "terminated [its] collaboration with the former French social media agency" and undertaken "a complete review of [its] French-language content.".

On 26 August, Chappaz announced that the government would sue Kick for alleged negligence. On the same day, the Paris prosecutor's office announced that an investigation would be opened into whether Kick had violated the EU Digital Services Act and if it had knowingly broadcast "videos of deliberate attacks on personal integrity". Kick criticized these decisions as politicizing the death. On 27 January 2026, Cenazandotti and Hamadi were taken into custody on charges of assault, incitement to hatred, abuse of a vulnerable person, and recording and broadcasting violent images in connection with Pormanove's death.

=== Attack on Syko Stu ===
On 24 August 2025, Raja Jackson, best known as the son of former martial artist Quinton "Rampage" Jackson, knocked independent wrestler Syko Stu unconscious with a wrestling slam and then proceeded to hit his unconscious head over 20 times in what was considered to be an unprompted attack. Raja, who is also known to livestream on Kick and other services, was livestreaming on Kick throughout the entire ordeal, and his cameraman captured all footage (including both the incident that sparked the attack and the attack itself).

== Gambling content ==
Kick has been accused of promoting gambling content to its audience, including underage people, as well as having ties to gambling industry figures and influencers. The founders of the online casino website Stake.com, Bijan Tehrani and Ed Craven, started Kick two months after Twitch banned certain gambling videos including those from Stake. Stake and Kick operate from the same headquarters in Melbourne, both are owned by Easygo, and share a number of executives and employees.

Concordia University assistant professor Andrei Zanescu said that Kick's generous terms of service toward streamers, which only takes 5% of its creators' earnings instead of Twitch's 50%, can be explained by the influx of new users that Stake was receiving as the result of gambling streamers who broadcast themselves on Kick while using the gambling platform.

UCLA Gambling Studies Program co-director Timothy Fong has expressed concerns about Kick's lack of transparency over gambling content. Twitch's former director of creator development, Marcus Graham, also criticized Kick for its lack of transparency around its connections to gambling platforms. He stated that "there are so many red flags present that it is embarrassing watching people who I respect give this platform an ounce of credibility". In 2022, Graham called Kick a "sham" due to its lack of information about its investors.

Craven stated in 2023 that the website intended to decrease exposure to gambling content. He also said that the platform had strong safety controls to block children from being exposed to gambling livestreams, as well as people who live in jurisdictions where gambling is outlawed.

In March 2025, Kick updated its monetization policies by removing the partner program payout for streamers in the Slots & Casino category. This change means that gambling content creators, including those streaming on platforms like Stake, are no longer eligible for the hourly pay under Kick's Partner Program. Kick's decision aligns with growing ethical concerns about incentivizing gambling content, especially among younger audiences.

== Streaming deals ==
Trainwreckstv was among the earliest major streaming personalities on Kick. Through 2023, the platform signed streaming deals with Hikaru Nakamura, Adin Ross, BruceDropEmOff, Amouranth, Tfue, and the Italian football journalist Fabrizio Romano. In June 2023, Kick announced that xQc signed a two-year, $70 million non-exclusive deal to the platform, with incentives that could increase the deal's value to $100 million. This made the signing of xQc to Kick the largest streaming deal, surpassing Ninja's $50 million exclusivity deal with the defunct Microsoft-owned Mixer. The same month, political commentator Steven "Destiny" Bonnell announced a non-exclusive 12-month partnership with Kick for an undisclosed 7-figure amount. Kick also signed a $1 million deal with Ilya Maddyson. UFC fighter Max Holloway streams regularly on Kick.

In August 2024, Adin Ross hosted a stream with U.S. presidential candidate Donald Trump, which had 580,000 live viewers and over 2.7 million views on YouTube. This event was part of Trump's campaign strategy to engage with younger audiences, with his son Barron reportedly encouraging the outreach to the "manosphere" community.

== Sponsorships ==
=== Motorsport ===
In January 2023, Sauber Motorsport signed multi-year sponsorship deals with Kick and Stake; Stake served as a sponsor of the team as "Alfa Romeo F1 Team Stake", while the team raced under the Kick branding as "Alfa Romeo F1 Team Kick" in countries with restrictions on the advertising of gambling. Alfa Romeo raced a revised Kick livery at the 2023 Belgian Grand Prix, adding neon green accenting based on the site's branding.

Alfa Romeo left the sport after the end of the year, and both Kick and Stake extended their relationship with Sauber Motorsport, renaming the team to "Stake F1 Team Kick Sauber." As before, the team races without Stake branding in countries with restrictions on the advertising of gambling. Kick also secured the naming rights to Sauber's 2024 and 2025 chassis, naming it as Kick Sauber C44 and Kick Sauber C45, respectively.

=== Esports ===
In June 2023, as an extension of the Sauber partnership Sauber announced a title partnership with Kick to form "Alfa Romeo F1 Team Kick Esports" and entered the 2023–24 Formula One Sim Racing World Championship as Kick F1 Sim Racing Team (the team entered the first round as Alfa Romeo F1 Team Kick Esports prior to Alfa Romeo's departure). Kick F1 Sim Racing Team continues with Thomas Ronhaar and Brendon Leigh for the 2024–25 season following a successful first season.

=== Football ===
In August 2023, Kick signed a multi-year sponsorship deal with Premier League club Everton as the club's official sleeve sponsor.

=== MMA ===
In October 2024, the UFC partnered with Kick to launch a dedicated streaming channel featuring watchalongs, press conferences, behind-the-scenes content, and fighter interviews.

== Policies ==
According to Kick, streamers on the platform keep 95% of subscription revenue.

In late 2024, Kick implemented changes to its gambling policies to address concerns over harmful and exploitative content. Effective 1 February 2025, the platform permits gambling streams only from sites that use ID verification to ensure users are at least 18 years old.

Kick is one of the platforms that was age restricted to 16 years or older in Australia under the Online Safety Amendment (Social Media Minimum Age) Act 2024.
