= PointsBet Invitational =

Annual curling tournament

- Established: 2022
- Abolished: 2026

The PointsBet Invitational was an annual curling tournament put on by Curling Canada as one of its four "Season of Champions" events (along with the Scotties, the Brier and either the men's or women's World Curling Championships). In July 2026, Curling Canada confirmed that the event "will no longer be part of their annual schedule of events." Replacing the event in 2027-28 season will be the Canadian Mixed Doubles Curling Championship.

From 2022 to 2024, the tournament was held as a single-elimination tournament, and featured the top ranked teams in the country, as well as the winners of certain national championships such as the Canadian Junior Curling Championships, the Canadian University Curling Championships, the Canadian College Curling Championships and the Canadian Curling Club Championships. The winning teams receive $50,000.

The event began in 2022, and consisted of 16 teams. It is broadcast on television on TSN and is sponsored by PointsBet, an online gambling website. As a single-elimination tournament, it is meant to emulate the "March Madness" NCAA basketball tournament, with round names being called the "Sweep 16", "Elite 8" and "Final Four".

In 2025, the event transitioned to pool play, with a new format of 10 teams divided into two pools. It featured the teams playing in the 2025 Canadian Olympic Curling Trials, the next best team on the Canadian Team Ranking System, the defending Canadian Junior Champion, and the top team in Curling Canada's "NextGen Under-27 program".

The event replaced the Canada Cup and Continental Cup events on Curling Canada's season of champions calendar.

== Winners ==
=== Men ===
Year	Champion team	Runner-up team	Host City
2022	(Manitoba) Reid Carruthers, Jason Gunnlaugson, Derek Samagalski, Connor Njegovan	(Manitoba) Matt Dunstone, B. J. Neufeld, Colton Lott, Ryan Harnden	Fredericton, New Brunswick
2023	(Manitoba) Reid Carruthers, Brad Jacobs, Derek Samagalski, Connor Njegovan	(Manitoba) Matt Dunstone, B. J. Neufeld, Colton Lott, Ryan Harnden	Oakville, Ontario
2024	(Saskatchewan) Mike McEwen, Colton Flasch, Kevin Marsh, Dan Marsh	(Newfoundland and Labrador) Brad Gushue, Mark Nichols, E. J. Harnden, Geoff Walker	Calgary, Alberta
2025	(Manitoba) Matt Dunstone, Colton Lott, E. J. Harnden, Ryan Harnden	(Alberta) Brad Jacobs, Marc Kennedy, Brett Gallant, Ben Hebert	Calgary, Alberta

=== Women ===
Year	Champion team	Runner-up team	Host City
2022	(Manitoba) Jennifer Jones, Karlee Burgess, Mackenzie Zacharias, Lauren Lenentine, Emily Zacharias	(Alberta) Kristie Moore, Kate Hogan, Jessie Haughian, Taylor McDonald	Fredericton, New Brunswick
2023	(Ontario) Rachel Homan, Tracy Fleury, Emma Miskew, Sarah Wilkes	(Manitoba) Kerri Einarson, Val Sweeting, Shannon Birchard, Briane Harris	Oakville, Ontario
2024	(Ontario) Rachel Homan, Tracy Fleury, Emma Miskew, Sarah Wilkes	(Alberta) Kayla Skrlik, Margot Flemming, Ashton Skrlik, Geri-Lynn Ramsay	Calgary, Alberta
2025	(Ontario) Rachel Homan, Tracy Fleury, Emma Miskew, Sarah Wilkes, Rachelle Brown	(British Columbia) Corryn Brown, Erin Pincott, Sarah Koltun, Samantha Fisher	Calgary, Alberta
